= Alan Aguerre =

Argentine footballer

Personal information
- Full name: Alan Joaquín Aguerre
- Date of birth: 23 August 1990 (age 36)
- Place of birth: Buenos Aires, Argentina
- Height: 1.81 m (5 ft 11 in)
- Position: Goalkeeper

Team information
- Current team: Central Córdoba SdE
- Number: 1

Youth career
- 1995–2009: Vélez Sarsfield

Senior career*
Years	Team	Apps	(Gls)
2009–2018	Vélez Sarsfield	67	(0)
2018–2022	Newell's Old Boys	75	(0)
2022–2024	Talleres	6	(0)
2023	→ Lanús (loan)	8	(0)
2024–2025	Lanús	10	(0)
2025–	Central Córdoba SdE	62	(0)
- * Club domestic league appearances and goals as of 17:15, 12 November 2026 (UTC)

Alan Joaquín Aguerre (born 23 August 1990) is an Argentine footballer who plays as a goalkeeper for Central Córdoba SdE in the Argentine Primera División.

== Career ==
Aguerre started his professional career playing for Vélez Sarsfield in a 4–1 victory over Atlético de Rafaela, for the 2013 Inicial, replacing injured Sebastián Sosa in the starting lineup. Despite the strength of Vélez' youths in every other position of the field, Aguerre was the first goalkeeper of the club's youth divisions to debut for the first team since Bernardo Leyenda in 1999. The goalkeeper was an unused substitute for Sosa in Vélez' 2012 Inicial, 2012–13 Superfinal and 2013 Supercopa Argentina winning campaigns.

In the 2015 Argentine Primera División, Aguerre replaced Sosa as the starting goalkeeper of the team. He saved his first penalty kick in a 2–2 draw with Godoy Cruz for the 9th fixture. Aguerre's first clean sheet was in a 2–0 victory over Boca Juniors, in which, according to the local sports media, he had an outstanding performance.

With Fabián Cubero and Leandro Somoza injured, Aguerre also captained Vélez's young squad during the second half of the tournament. At the end of the year, the goalkeeper was selected as Vélez Sarsfield's best player of the year in a poll held at the club's official website. After the end of the 2016 Argentine Primera División, the goalkeeper was linked with Argentine powerhouse River Plate to replace Marcelo Barovero, although he ended up staying in Vélez.

In August 2016, Aguerre surpassed José Luis Chilavert's record for consecutive minutes with a clean sheet playing for Vélez, with a total 669' (held along Gonzalo Yordan, who played 20 minutes in the 0–0 draw with Banfield).

== Honours ==
Vélez Sarsfield:

- Argentine Primera División
  - 2012 Inicial
  - 2012–13 Superfinal
- Supercopa Argentina
  - 2013
