= Ángel Allegri =

Argentine footballer

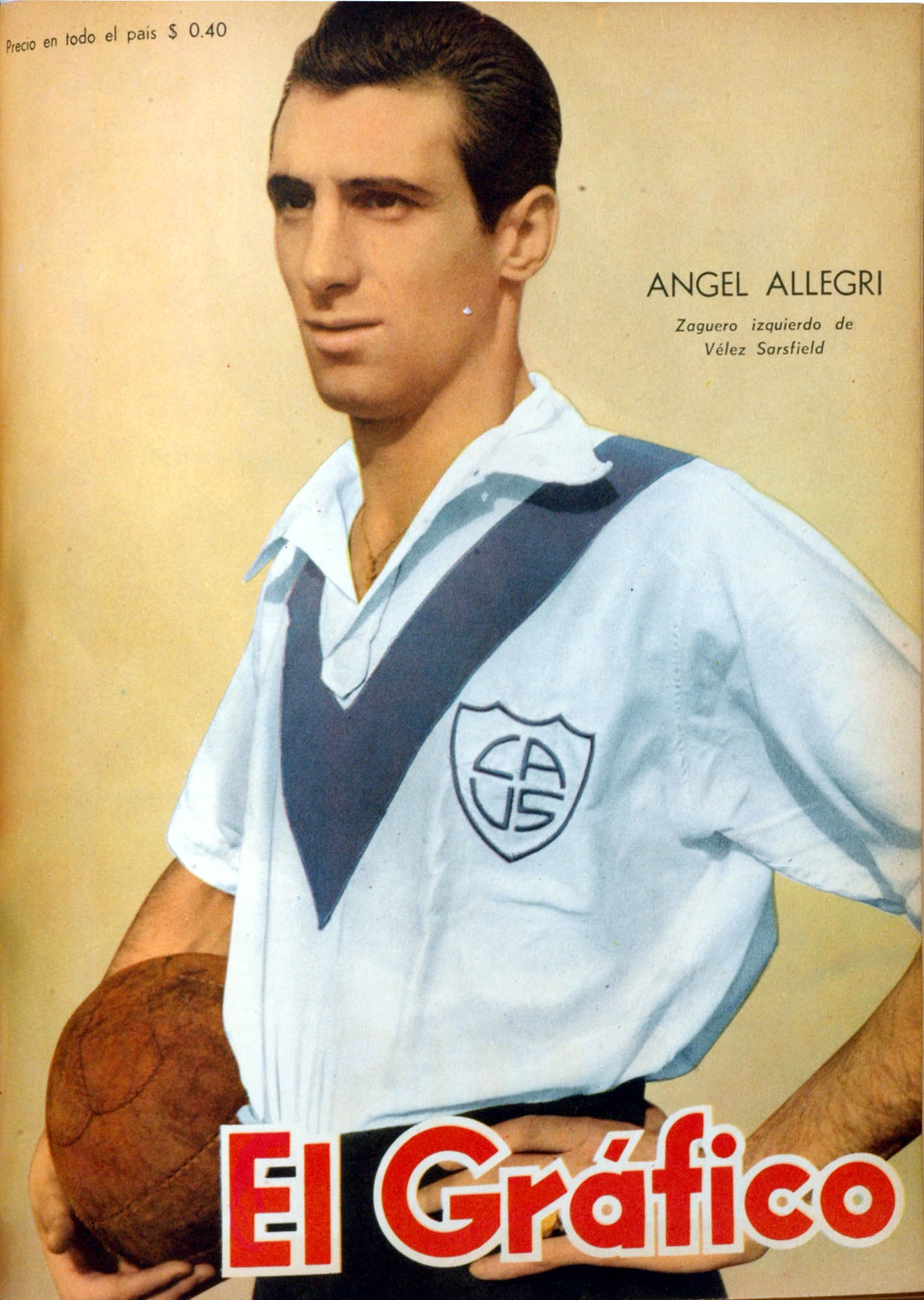

Personal information
- Full name: Ángel Natalio Allegri
- Date of birth: 26 December 1926
- Place of birth: Buenos Aires, Argentina
- Date of death: 30 December 1981 (aged 55)
- Position: Centre back

Senior career*
Years	Team	Apps	(Gls)
1946–1960	Vélez Sársfield	384	(36)

International career
1950–1951	Argentina	4	(0)

Managerial career
- 1963: Nueva Chicago
- 1966: Colón
- 1966: Temperley
- 1970: Quilmes
- * Club domestic league appearances and goals

Ángel Natalio Allegri was an Argentine footballer. He played during his entire 14-year professional career for Vélez Sársfield in the Argentine Primera División, totaling 384 games and 36 goals. He is the third player with most appearances in the club's history, behind Fabian Cubero (who have 458) and Pedro Larraquy (who has 457).

Allegri also has the negative record of most own goals scored in the Argentine Primera, with 7.

== Club career ==
Allegri played his first game for Vélez Sársfield in 1946. In the 1953 championship, he was an integral part of the team that finished runner-up, behind River Plate. The defender retired in 1960.

== International career ==
Allegri also played 4 games for the Argentina national team between 1950 and 1951.
