= Sebastián Domínguez =

Argentine footballer (born 1980)

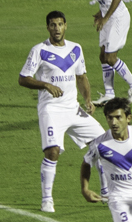

Personal information
- Full name: Sebastián Enrique Domínguez
- Date of birth: 29 July 1980 (age 46)
- Place of birth: Buenos Aires, Argentina
- Height: 1.83 m (6 ft 0 in)
- Position: Centre back

Youth career
- Newell's Old Boys

Senior career*
Years	Team	Apps	(Gls)
1998–2004	Newell's Old Boys	79	(2)
2005–2006	Corinthians	24	(1)
2007	Estudiantes LP	29	(1)
2008	América	22	(1)
2009–2015	Vélez Sársfield	192	(6)
2015–2016	Estudiantes LP	18	(1)
2016–2017	Newell's Old Boys	31	(1)

International career
2009–2017	Argentina	8	(0)

Managerial career
- 2022–2023: Al-Duhail (assistant)
- 2024: Tigre
- 2025: Vélez Sarsfield
- 2026: Deportivo Garcilaso
- 2026: Central Córdoba
- * Club domestic league appearances and goals

Sebastián Enrique Domínguez (born 29 July 1980) is an Argentine football manager and former player who played as a centre back. He was recently the manager of Central Córdoba.

Dominguez' professional football career spanned 19 years during which he played for teams in Argentina, Brazil and Mexico, winning titles with all but one.

== Early life ==
Domínguez was born in Buenos Aires and moved to Rosario at an early age with the relocation of his parents'. There, he played in the youth system of Newell's Old Boys. His father coached Lionel Messi in the club's youth divisions.

== Club career ==
Dominguez made his professional debut for Newell's Old Boys in 1998, at 18 years. At an early age he was purchased by a third-party and loaned to Talleres de Córdoba along with his teammate Maxi Rodríguez, but he was never authorized to play for the club and returned to Newell's shortly after. He played as a defensive midfielder until 2004, when he was moved to centre back by coach Américo Gallego and he captained the team that won the 2004 Apertura tournament, thus breaking the club's 12-year title drought. The central defender played 18 games (out of 19) during the tournament, all of them as a starter.

After winning the league championship with Newell's, Domínguez was purchased by third-party Media Sports Investment for $2.5 million (US), that loaned him along with fellow Argentine players Carlos Tevez and Javier Mascherano to Brazilian side SC Corinthians. With his new club, he won the 2005 Campeonato Brasileiro Série A.

During the 2007 January transfer window, Domínguez returned to Argentina to play for Estudiantes de La Plata, under Diego Simeone's coaching. He played with the team the whole year, after which he was signed by Mexico side América in January 2008. Although he helped the team to win the 2008 InterLiga and scored in the derby against Chivas de Guadalajara, he was released from his contract at year-end.

On 27 January 2009, Vélez Sársfield signed the defender on a free transfer. He immediately established himself as a starter as center back playing along Nicolás Otamendi. Domínguez featured in all 19 games of his first tournament in Vélez, the 2009 Clausura, helping the team to claim the national championship. He was also a regular along Fernando Ortiz as centre back in Vélez' 2011 Clausura winning campaign (playing 16 games), as well as the team's 2011 Copa Libertadores semi-finalist campaign (playing all 12 games and scoring one goal). Domínguez also helped Vélez to win the 2012 Inicial, starting 18 games and scoring two goals. In that year he was also selected by the fans of Vélez on an online poll as the club's best player of the year.

In 2013, the defender obtained two further titles with Vélez: the 2012–13 Superfinal (defeating his former team Newell's Old Boys) and the 2013 Supercopa Argentina (defeating Arsenal de Sarandí), in both of which he was a starter for his team. During that year Domínguez also played his 200th official game with the club in a 1–1 draw with All Boys.

== International career ==
On 31 August 2009 Domínguez was called up by coach Diego Maradona for the Argentina national team, along fellow Vélez Sársfield teammates Nicolás Otamendi and Emiliano Papa. With Argentina, the defender started the World Cup qualifier games against Brazil and Paraguay (both defeats for Argentina).

Domínguez was later called by coach Alejandro Sabella for the 2011 and 2012 editions of the friendly competition Superclásico de las Américas, in which he captained the national team. He was also called by Sabella for 2014 World Cup qualifying matches, including the last two against Peru and Uruguay. However, he did not take part of the squad for the World Cup.

== Managerial career ==
After retiring, Domínguez worked as a panelist in TV sport programmes before joining the staff of Hernán Crespo at Al-Duhail in 2022. On 5 April 2024, he was appointed manager of Tigre.

On 27 December 2024, Domínguez agreed to return to Vélez, now as first team manager. The following 2 March, however, he resigned.

On 18 March 2026, Domínguez was announced as manager of Deportivo Garcilaso in Peru. On 27 July, he returned to his home country and took over Central Córdoba.

== Personal life ==
Domínguez studied architecture, but did not get far in his career. He plays guitar and harmonica and enjoys Argentine and British rock.

In 2014, Domínguez graduated as a football coach in Argentina.

In November 2020, Domínguez spoke about homosexuality in association football, saying that it is a problem for footballers to not "interpret, understand, and accept" homosexuals and that it was a "debt" that footballers had with the gay community. He went on to say that footballers were "cavemen" regarding homosexuality and said that it did not matter "whether [you] are gay to play football."

== Managerial statistics ==
As of 2 November 2026

Managerial record by team and tenure
Team	Nat	From	To	Record							
Team	Nat	From	To	G	W	D	L	GF	GA	GD	Win %
Tigre	(Argentina)	5 April 2024	2 January 2025	30	8	11	11	29	35	−6	26.67
Vélez Sarsfield	(Argentina)	6 January 2025	2 March 2025	9	1	2	6	1	13	−12	11.11
Deportivo Garcilaso	(Peru)	18 March 2026	23 July 2026	15	7	4	4	20	14	+6	46.67
Central Córdoba	(Argentina)	27 July 2026	5 November 2026	14	2	4	8	11	24	−13	14.29
Total				68	18	21	29	61	86	−25	26.47

== Titles ==
Newell's Old Boys

- Argentine Primera División (1): 2004 Apertura

Corinthians

- Campeonato Brasileiro Série A (1): 2005

América

- InterLiga (1): 2008

Vélez Sársfield

- Argentine Primera División (4): 2009 Clausura, 2011 Clausura, 2012 Inicial, 2012–13 Superfinal
- Supercopa Argentina (1): 2013
