= Victorio Spinetto =

Argentine football player and manager (1911–1990)

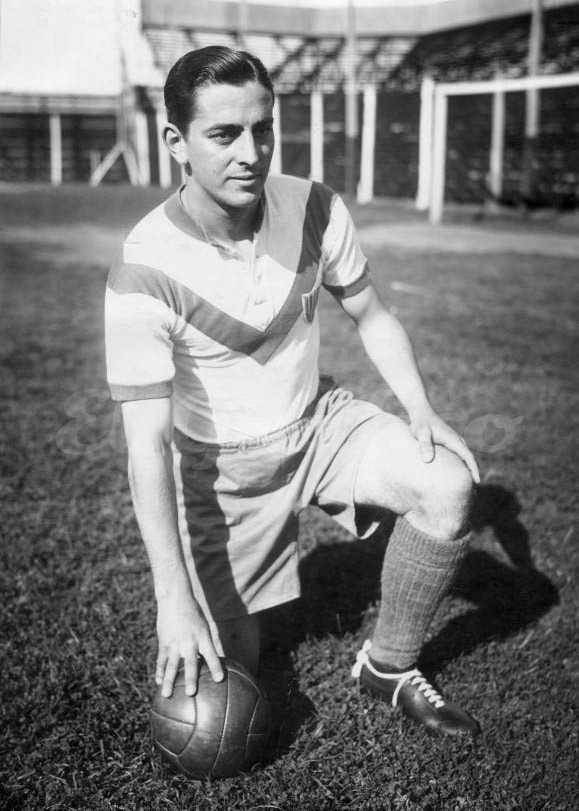
- Spinetto in 1937

Personal information
- Full name: Victorio Luis Spinetto
- Date of birth: 11 June 1911
- Place of birth: Buenos Aires, Argentina
- Date of death: 28 August 1990 (aged 79)
- Position: Centre half

Senior career*
Years	Team	Apps	(Gls)
1932	Platense		
1932–1937	Vélez Sársfield	210	(44)
1938	Independiente		
1939–1940	Vélez Sársfield	above	(above)
Total		233	(49)

International career
1934–1936	Argentina		

Managerial career
- 1942–1956: Vélez Sársfield
- 1956–1959: Atlanta
- 1959: Argentina
- 1960–1961: Argentina
- 1962–1963: Argentinos Juniors
- 1970: Racing Club
- 1971: Racing Club
- 1972–1973: Argentinos Juniors
- 1973–1976: Ferro Carril Oeste
- 1978: Argentinos Juniors
- * Club domestic league appearances and goals

Victorio Luis Spinetto (3 June 1911 – 28 August 1990) was an Argentine football player and manager. He played as a centre half, mostly for Vélez Sársfield in the Argentine Primera División, debuting with the club in 1932 and retiring in 1940. After retiring, Spinetto took managerial duties in the team, and held the position for 14 years.

Apart from his career in Vélez, Spinetto played briefly for Platense and Independiente, and managed several other teams, most notably the Argentina national football team (in a three-men staff during 1959, and alone in the period 1960–1961).

== Early life ==
Victorio was born on 3 June 1911 in Buenos Aires to Juan Bautista Luis Spinetto and Margarita María Batigne. He studied in the Colegio Nacional de Buenos Aires.

== Playing career ==
=== Club ===
Spinetto started his career in Platense in 1932. That same year, Vélez Sársfield's executive José Amalfitani offered him to join the club for a salary of $30 Argentine pesos per match. The defender accepted, and debuted with the first team after only one game with the reserves. Spinetto's success was so quick that the club raised his salary to $250 monthly, and $30 for every point won by the team.

Despite playing in the defensive position of centre half, Spinetto was a prolific goalscorer. He made a total 44 goals for Vélez, including four in a game against Chacarita Juniors in 1937, when he helped his team come back from a 0–2 to win 5–2.

During his career, the defender rejected offers from Boca Juniors and Italian AS Roma, finally joining Independiente in 1938 for a $12,000 Argentine pesos transfer fee, plus the loan of a player. He played one year in Independiente, being part of the team that played against River Plate the first game in the Estadio Monumental's history.

Upon his return to Vélez, in 1940 Spinetto was part of the team that was relegated from the Argentine first division for the first (and to date only) time in the club's history. Unable to recover from an injury, the defender retired subsequent to the relegation.

=== International ===
Spinetto played for the Argentina national football team between 1934 and 1936.

== Coaching career ==
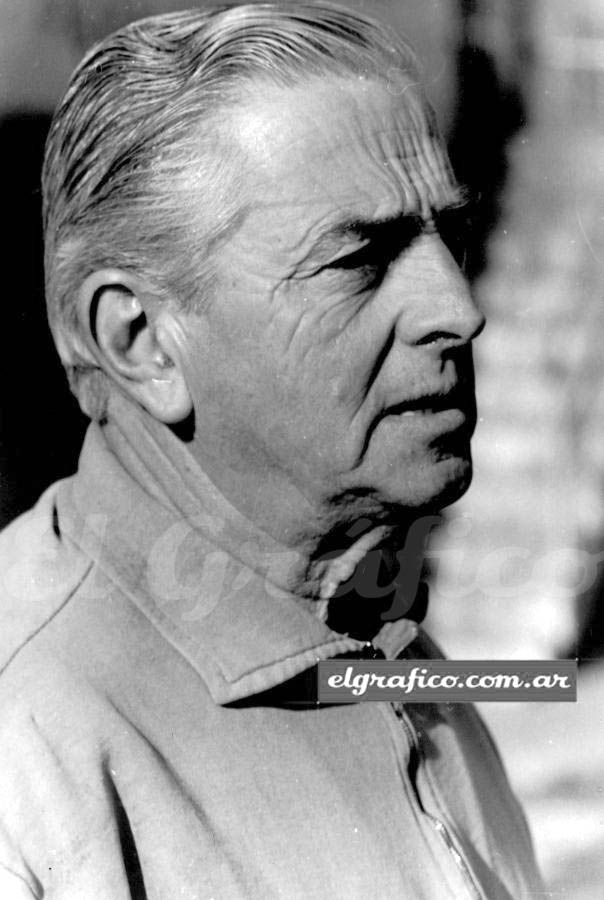
Spinetto as coach in 1970

After his retirement, Spinetto took up the manager position in Vélez Sársfield, helping the team return to the first division in 1943. He also coached the team that was runner-up in the 1953 Argentine Primera División season.

In 1959, he coached along José Della Torre and José Barreiro the Argentina national football team that won the 1959 South American Championship.

Spinetto also coached Argentinos Juniors in three periods (1962–1963, 1972–1973 and 1978), totaling 155 games. He then went on to coach in Vélez Sársfield's youth divisions until his death in 1990.

== See also ==
- List of football managers with the most matches
