= 1958 Campeonato Profesional =

Campeonato Profesional
- Season: 1958
- Champions: Santa Fe (2nd title)
- Matches: 180
- Goals: 644 (3.58 per match)
- Top goalscorer: José Montanini (36)
- Biggest home win: Deportes Tolima 5–0 Atlético Manizales
- Biggest away win: Atlético Manizales 0–6 Santa Fe
- Highest scoring: Atlético Quindío 8–4 Cúcuta Deportivo

The 1958 Campeonato Profesional was the 11th season of Colombia's top-flight football league. After the previous season's multi-stage competition, the Campeonato Profesional returned to a single-stage format, with everyone playing each other 4 times over the season. The tournament began in May, a month after the end of the previous season.

Independiente Santa Fe won the league for 2nd time in its history after getting 48 points (Santa Fe was the champion of the first Campeonato Profesional in 1948), while defending champions Independiente Medellín did not compete.

== Background ==
10 teams competed in the tournament, down from the previous season's 12, with Unión Magdalena withdrawing because economic problems, while Boca Juniors de Cali refusing to participate in any further Dimayor tournaments. To balance their removal, Atlético Manizales rejoined the competition (its last tournament being 1954). Atlético Nacional and Independiente Medellín mixed their teams competing under the name of Atlético Nacional, but known popularly as Independiente Nacional.

== League system ==
Every team played four games against each other team, two at home and two away. Teams received two points for a win and one point for a draw. If two or more teams were tied on points, places were determined by goal difference. The team with the most points is the champion of the league.

== Teams ==
Locations of the 1958 Campeonato Profesional teams:
- 1. Armenia
- 2. Bogotá
- 3. Bucaramanga
- 4. Cúcuta
- 5. Ibagué
- 6. Medellín
- 7. Pereira
- 8. Manizales
- 9. Cali

Team	City	Stadium
América	Cali	Estadio Olímpico Pascual Guerrero
Atlético Bucaramanga	Bucaramanga	Estadio Alfonso López
Atlético Manizales	Manizales	Estadio Palogrande
Atlético Nacional	Medellín	Estadio Atanasio Girardot
Atlético Quindío	Armenia	Estadio San José de Armenia
Cúcuta Deportivo	Cúcuta	Estadio General Santander
Deportes Tolima	Ibagué	Estadio 10 de Mayo
Deportivo Pereira	Pereira	Estadio Alberto Mora Mora
Millonarios	Bogotá	Estadio El Campín
Santa Fe	Bogotá	Estadio El Campín

== Final league table ==
Pos	Team	Pld	W	D	L	GF	GA	GD	Pts
1	Santa Fe (C)	36	17	14	5	78	51	+27	48
2	Millonarios	36	20	7	9	68	42	+26	47
3	Atlético Bucaramanga	36	18	8	10	68	54	+14	44
4	Deportivo Pereira	36	18	6	12	60	54	+6	42
5	Atlético Nacional	36	14	11	11	66	56	+10	39
6	Deportes Tolima	36	12	14	10	65	61	+4	38
7	Cúcuta Deportivo	36	11	11	14	63	66	−3	33
8	Atlético Quindío	36	10	11	15	68	64	+4	31
9	Atlético Manizales	36	10	6	20	65	98	−33	26
10	América de Cali	36	4	4	28	44	99	−55	12

Source: RSSSF
(C) Champions

=== Results ===
==== First turn ====
Home \ Away	AME	BUC	CUC	MAN	MIL	NAC	PER	QUI	SFE	TOL
América		2–3	0–1	1–0	1–2	1–1	0–1	2–7	1–2	1–3
Atlético Bucaramanga	2–0		3–1	4–1	4–2	2–0	0–3	1–1	1–1	2–1
Cúcuta Deportivo	1–0	2–0		3–2	3–2	1–1	4–1	1–2	1–2	1–2
Atlético Manizales	3–2	1–3	1–3		1–2	0–2	2–1	3–3	1–3	4–4
Millonarios	5–2	4–1	0–0	0–1		1–1	2–1	2–1	0–3	1–1
Atlético Nacional	0–1	2–2	3–2	4–2	1–4		4–0	2–0	2–2	2–4
Deportivo Pereira	2–0	3–0	2–1	4–1	2–0	4–3		2–1	1–1	2–1
Atlético Quindío	2–0	1–1	8–4	1–1	0–1	1–2	1–1		2–0	3–3
Santa Fe	5–2	1–0	3–0	3–3	1–1	3–3	2–2	2–0		3–2
Deportes Tolima	6–2	1–0	1–1	5–0	0–2	1–1	1–0	1–1	1–1	

Legend: Blue = home team win; Yellow = draw; Red = away team win.

==== Second turn ====
Home \ Away	AME	BUC	CUC	MAN	MIL	NAC	PER	QUI	SFE	TOL
América		1–3	1–1	4–2	0–2	2–3	3–3	1–5	4–4	1–2
Atlético Bucaramanga	4–2		2–0	3–5	1–0	0–0	3–0	1–0	2–2	2–1
Cúcuta Deportivo	2–0	1–1		4–2	2–2	1–1	1–1	3–1	3–1	3–4
Atlético Manizales	4–3	6–4	3–2		1–1	3–2	2–1	2–0	0–6	2–2
Millonarios	4–1	1–2	5–2	3–2		1–3	2–2	3–0	2–0	4–1
Atlético Nacional	1–2	2–1	2–1	4–0	1–0		3–0	2–4	1–1	1–1
Deportivo Pereira	2–0	0–1	2–1	4–2	0–1	4–3		3–0	1–0	1–0
Atlético Quindío	4–0	1–1	3–3	3–1	0–3	0–1	4–0		3–4	1–1
Santa Fe	4–1	3–2	1–1	2–0	0–1	2–1	4–2	3–1		2–2
Deportes Tolima	6–2	1–0	1–1	5–0	0–2	1–1	1–0	1–1	1–1	

Legend: Blue = home team win; Yellow = draw; Red = away team win.

=== Top goalscorers ===
Rank	Name	Club	Goals
1	(Argentina) José Montanini	Atlético Bucaramanga	36
2	(Argentina) Walter Marcolini	Independiente Medellín	35
3	(Argentina) Nolberto Sotelo	Atlético Manizales	29
4	(Argentina) José Grecco	Santa Fe	25
5	(Colombia) Delio Gamboa	Atlético Nacional	23
6	(Paraguay) Francisco Solano Patiño	Deportivo Pereira	21
7	(Colombia) Eusebio Escobar	Atlético Manizales	20
8	(Argentina) Juan José Ferraro	Santa Fe	19
9	(Argentina) Orlando Larraz	Millonarios	16
9	(Argentina) Felipe Marino	Cúcuta Deportivo	16

Source: RSSSF.com Colombia 1958
