= Juan Carlos Carone =

Argentine footballer (1942–2025)

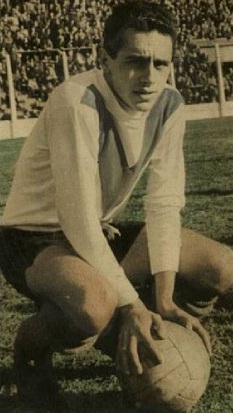

Personal information
- Full name: Juan Carlos Carone
- Date of birth: 18 May 1942
- Place of birth: Buenos Aires, Argentina
- Date of death: June 2025 (aged 83)
- Position: Left winger

Youth career
- River Plate
- 1957–1962: Atlanta

Senior career*
Years	Team	Apps	(Gls)
1962–1963	Atlanta		
1964–1969	Vélez Sársfield	149	(76)
1970	Racing Club		
1970–1971	Veracruz		

International career
1966–1967	Argentina	5	(2)
- * Club domestic league appearances and goals

Juan Carlos "Pichino" Carone (18 May 1942 – June 2025) was an Argentine footballer. He played as a right-footed left winger.

Carone was most notable for his period in Vélez Sársfield (1964–1969), where he scored 76 goals in 149 games in the Argentine Primera División, being the 6th overall top scorer in the club's history.

Carone was nicknamed "Pichino", meaning 'kid' in Italian. He died in June 2025, at the age of 83.

== Club career ==
Carone played youth football in River Plate and Atlanta, and debuted in the Argentine Primera División with the latter on 5 August 1962, in a 2–0 defeat to Gimnasia y Esgrima La Plata.

In 1963, Vélez Sársfield paid eleven million Argentine pesos (six in cash plus the loan of two players) to buy him. With Vélez, he was the top goalscorer of the Argentine Primera División in the 1965 championship (with 19 goals), and was part of the league title winning team in the 1968 Nacional, though he played rarely in the latter due to an Achilles tendon injury.

In 1970, the winger moved to Racing Club, where he played for half-a-year. He then retired playing in Mexico with Veracruz.

== International career ==
Carone played for the Argentina national team in the 1966 FIFA World Cup qualification, but was not part of the final World Cup squad. He also played in the 1967 South American Championship.

== Honours ==
Vélez Sársfield

- Argentine Primera División: 1968 Nacional
