= 1965 Argentine Primera División =

74th season of top-tier football league in Argentina

Primera División
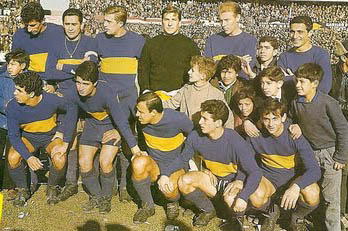
- Boca Juniors, champions
- Season: 1965
- Champions: Boca Juniors (16th title)
- Promoted: Lanús; Platense
- Relegated: (none)
- 1966 Copa Libertadores: Boca Juniors; River Plate
- Top goalscorer: (Argentina) Juan Carlos Carone (19 goals)

The 1965 Argentine Primera División was the 74th season of top-flight football in Argentina. The season began on April 18 and ended on December 19.

There were 18 teams in the tournament, who competed in a single double round-robin tournament. Boca Juniors won its 16th league title with no teams relegated.

== Standings ==
Pos	Team	Pld	W	D	L	GF	GA	GD	Pts
1	Boca Juniors	34	19	12	3	55	30	+25	50
2	River Plate	34	22	5	7	55	24	+31	49
3	Vélez Sarsfield	34	14	12	8	48	32	+16	40
4	Ferro Carril Oeste	34	11	15	8	41	33	+8	37
5	Racing	34	10	16	8	39	35	+4	36
6	Estudiantes (LP)	34	13	10	11	41	39	+2	36
7	Platense	34	12	11	11	37	30	+7	35
8	San Lorenzo	34	12	10	12	41	35	+6	34
9	Banfield	34	11	12	11	34	32	+2	34
10	Rosario Central	34	9	14	11	37	39	−2	32
11	Newell's Old Boys	34	9	14	11	29	40	−11	32
12	Independiente (Note: Independiente won the 1965 Copa Libertadores, so, they qualified for the semifinals of the 1966 Copa Libertadores as title holders.)	34	8	15	11	30	31	−1	31
13	Huracán	34	11	9	14	45	54	−9	31
14	Atlanta	34	9	11	14	33	42	−9	29
15	Lanús	34	9	11	14	31	43	−12	29
16	Argentinos Juniors	34	10	8	16	41	51	−10	28
17	Gimnasia y Esgrima (LP)	34	9	7	18	31	57	−26	25
18	Chacarita Juniors	34	5	14	15	32	53	−21	24
