= Isaac Scliar =

Argentine footballer (1920–1991)

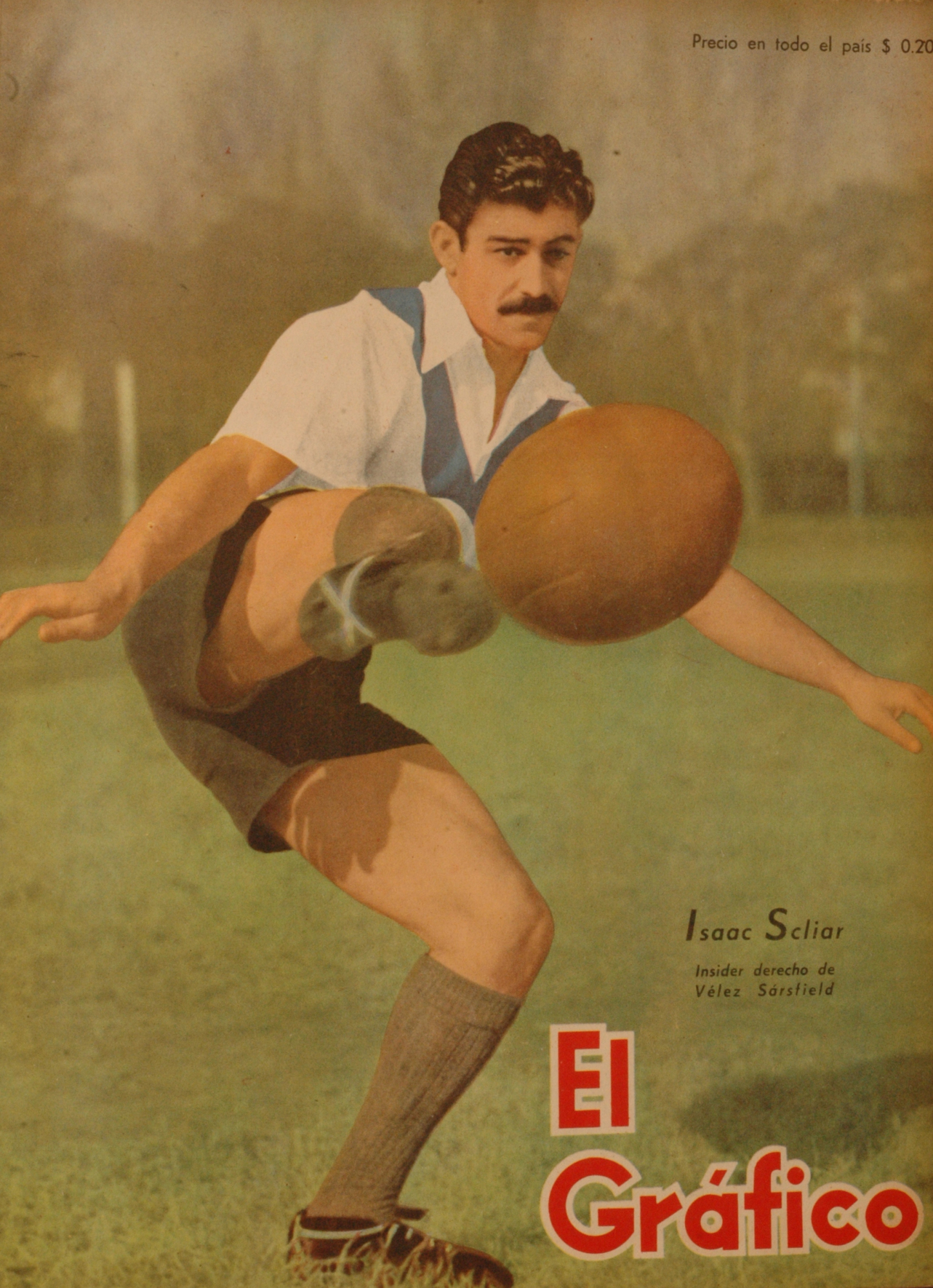
Isaac Scliar

Isaac Scliar (26 April 1920 – 3 July 1991) was an Argentine football striker. He was born in Rosario.

== Career ==
Scliar began his career in 1939 with Argentino de Quilmes. He moved to Club Atlético Atlanta and Newell's Old Boys over the next two seasons. He then joined Vélez Sársfield where he played until 1949. He finished his career by playing with Boca Juniors, Tigre and Quilmes until 1951. He was the third highest goal scorer in the 1949 season, tallying 20 goals for Vélez Sársfield, Boca Juniors and Tigre.

Scliar endured relegation from the Argentine top flight with Argentinos Juniors, Tigre and Quilmes.
