= 2013 Supercopa Argentina =

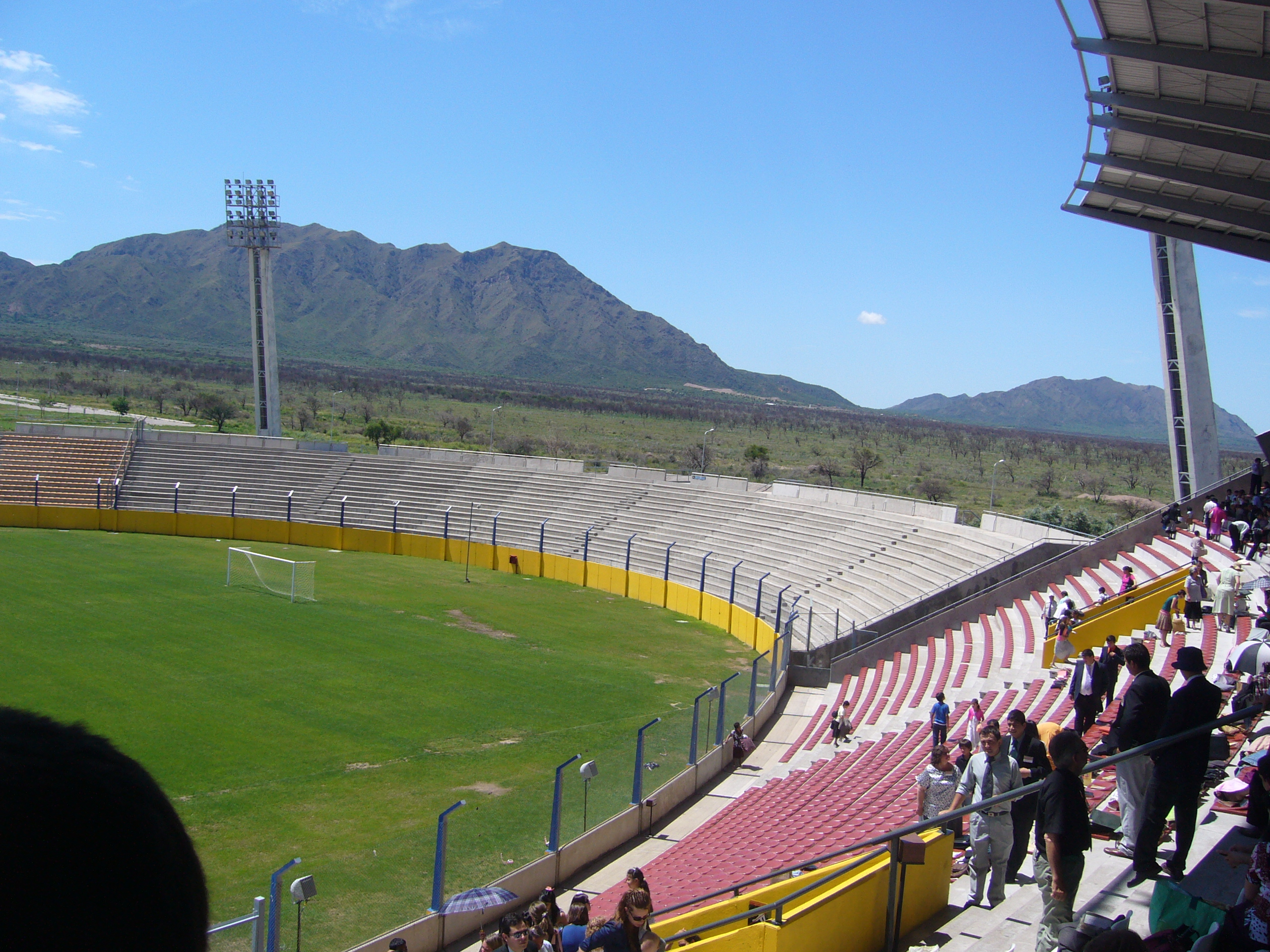
- Estadio Juan Gilberto Funes, venue
Vélez Sarsfield	Arsenal
1	0
- Date: 31 January 2014
- Venue: Estadio Juan Gilberto Funes, San Luis
- Referee: Fernando Rapallini

The 2013 Supercopa Argentina Final was the 2nd edition of the Supercopa Argentina, an annual football match contested by the winners of the Primera División and Copa Argentina competitions. Vélez Sarsfield beat Arsenal 1–0 in San Luis and won the cup.

== Qualified teams ==
Team	Qualification	Previous app.
Vélez Sarsfield	2012–13 Primera División champion	None
Arsenal	2012–13 Copa Argentina champion	**2012**

- **Bold** indicates winning years

== Match ==
=== Details ===
2014-01-31
21:10 UTC-3

Vélez Sarsfield	1–0	Arsenal
Canteros 59'	Report

Juan Gilberto Funes, San Luis
Referee: Fernando Rapallini

**Vélez Sarsfield**	**Arsenal**

GK	13	(Uruguay) Sebastián Sosa
DF	5	(Argentina) Fabián Cubero (c)	(yellow card) 86'
DF	6	(Argentina) Sebastián Domínguez
DF	2	(Argentina) Fernando Tobio
DF	3	(Argentina) Emiliano Papa
MF	29	(Argentina) Lucas Romero
MF	8	(Argentina) Héctor Canteros		(substituted off) 77'
MF	21	(Argentina) Agustín Allione
MF	11	(Argentina) Ariel Cabral
FW	9	(Argentina) Mauro Zárate		(substituted off) 90+1'
FW	12	(Argentina) Lucas Pratto	(yellow card) 87'
Substitutes:
GK	25	(Argentina) Alan Aguerre
DF	30	(Argentina) Facundo Cardozo
DF	32	(Argentina) Matías Pérez Acuña
DF	22	(Argentina) Leonardo Rolón
FW	33	(Argentina) Jorge Correa		(substituted on) 77'
FW	28	(Argentina) Ramiro Cáseres
FW	24	(Argentina) Federico Vázquez		(substituted on) 90+1'
Manager:
(Argentina) José Oscar Flores

GK	17	(Argentina) Cristian Campestrini
DF	4	(Argentina) Hugo Nervo (c)
DF	2	(Argentina) Mariano Echeverría	(yellow card) 86'
DF	6	(Argentina) Diego Braghieri
DF	15	(Argentina) Damián Pérez	(yellow card) 62'
MF	5	(Argentina) Iván Marcone
MF	13	(Argentina) Matías Zaldivia		(substituted off) 63'
MF	23	(Argentina) Ramiro Carrera	(yellow card) 65'	(substituted off) 70'
MF	19	(Argentina) Nicolás Aguirre		(substituted off) 19'
FW	18	(Argentina) Milton Caraglio
FW	9	(Argentina) Julio Furch
Substitutes:
GK	1	(Argentina) Alejandro Limia
MF	8	(Argentina) Gastón Esmerado
MF	20	(Argentina) Franco Zuculini	(yellow card) 86'	(substituted on) 63'
MF	33	(Argentina) Mauricio Sperduti
MF	10	(Argentina) Martín Rolle		(substituted on) 19'
MF	21	(Argentina) Jonathan David Gómez		(substituted on) 70'
FW	11	(Argentina) Emilio Zelaya
Manager:
(Argentina) Gustavo Alfaro

Assistant referees:
Ernesto Uziga
Diego Romero
Fourth official:
Andrés Merlos

**Match rules**

- 90 minutes.
- Penalty shoot-out if scores still level.
- Seven named substitutes.
- Maximum of three substitutions.

=== Statistics ===
Overall
	Vélez Sarsfield	Arsenal
Goals scored	1	0
Total shots	10	14
Shots on target	6	6
Ball possession	58%	42%
Corner kicks	7	3
Fouls committed	5	11
Offsides	2	0
Yellow cards	2	4
Red cards	0	0
