= Miguel Ángel Rugilo =

Argentine footballer

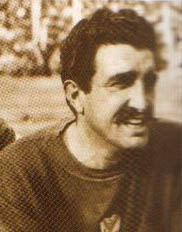
- Rugilo during his tenure on Velez Sarsfield.

Personal information
- Date of birth: January 19, 1919
- Place of birth: Buenos Aires, Argentina
- Date of death: September 16, 1993 (aged 74)
- Place of death: Buenos Aires, Argentina
- Position: Goalkeeper

Senior career*
Years	Team	Apps	(Gls)
1938–1944	Vélez Sarsfield		
1944–1946	León		
1946–1952	Vélez Sarsfield		
1952–1953	Palmeiras		
1954–1956	Tigre		
1957	O'Higgins		

International career
1950–1951	Argentina	4	(0)
- * Club domestic league appearances and goals

Miguel Ángel Rugilo (January 19, 1919 in Buenos Aires, Argentina – September 16, 1993 in Buenos Aires, Argentina) was an Argentine footballer who played for clubs of Argentina, Brazil, Chile and Mexico.

== Career ==
Rugilo debuted in the first division in 1937, playing for Vélez Sársfield against River Plate at Estadio Monumental, where Vélez was beaten 3–0. Rugilo would last 5 matches, replacing Jaime Rotman, who was injured. By 1942 Rugilo consolidated as a titular goalkeeper, playing in the División de Ascenso (then Primera B). In 1943 Vélez won the championship, promoting to Primera with Rugilo in the goal. A year later, he was sold to Club León of México, returning to Vélez in 1945.

In 1945 the Argentina national team coach, Guillermo Stábile called Rugilo to play two matches in the United Kingdom, facing England and Ireland. Although Rugilo only played four matches for the Argentina national team, he gained recognition on May 9, 1951, when Argentina played against England at Wembley Stadium. Although Argentina was beaten 2–1, journalists praised his performance at the match, nicknaming him "El León de Wembley" ("The Lion of Wembley"), and he would be called that way until his death in 1993.

Soon after his memorable performance at Wembley, Rugilo suffered a severe injury, breaking his leg. At the end of 1952, he left Vélez as a free player, being hired in 1953 by the Brazilian team Palmeiras, returning then to Argentina to play for Tigre and later moving to O'Higgins of Chile. Rugilo retired in 1958 at 41.

== In his own words ==
In 1972, Rugilo gave an interview to an Argentine magazine, where he detailed some anecdotes of his most famous match:

While we were leaving the field, I heard the shouts from the crowd, but I did not understand what they said because I don't speak English. It was Chichilo Sosa, the team masseur, who told me: 'Salute the crowd because it is you who they are acclaiming to'

After the match at Wembley, Argentina had to play a game more facing Ireland. Many people attended the match (which we won 1-0) just to watch me in the goal.
