= Turu Flores =

Argentine footballer and manager

Personal information
- Full name: José Oscar Flores Bringas
- Date of birth: 16 May 1971 (age 55)
- Place of birth: Buenos Aires, Argentina
- Height: 1.82 m (6 ft 0 in)
- Position: Striker

Senior career*
Years	Team	Apps	(Gls)
1990–1996	Vélez Sarsfield	153	(45)
1996–1998	Las Palmas	68	(35)
1998–2002	Deportivo La Coruña	84	(22)
2001–2002	→ Valladolid (loan)	8	(1)
2002–2003	Mallorca	12	(0)
2003–2004	Ciudad Murcia	22	(3)
2004–2005	Independiente	19	(4)
2006	Aldosivi	15	(6)
2007	Lyn	0	(0)
Total		381	(116)

International career
1994	Argentina	2	(0)

Managerial career
- 2009–2013: Vélez Sarsfield (assistant)
- 2014: Vélez Sarsfield
- 2015: Defensa y Justicia
- * Club domestic league appearances and goals

José Oscar "Turu" Flores Bringas (born 16 May 1971) is an Argentine retired professional footballer who played as a striker, and is a manager.

He started his professional career with Vélez Sarsfield in his native country, winning seven titles during the club's successful 1990s era. He then spent the following eight years in Spain – 194 league matches and 61 goals both major levels combined, mainly with Deportivo – and also played twice for the Argentina national team.

== Playing career ==
Born in Buenos Aires, Flores started his career with Vélez Sarsfield in 1990, going on to play a major part in their most successful era in the mid-1990s. During his time at the club he won seven major titles, including three national championships, the 1994 edition of the Copa Libertadores and the Intercontinental Cup.

In 1996, Flores joined Las Palmas in the Spanish second division for a then-record sum spent by any club in that tier, 500 million pesetas. He scored 21 goals in his second season, helping the Canary Islands team qualify for the promotion/relegation playoffs, eventually lost to Real Oviedo (4–3 on aggregate).

After his performances, Flores joined Deportivo de La Coruña also in the country, alongside teammate Manuel Pablo. He formed an efficient striker partnership with Portuguese Pauleta first and Dutch Roy Makaay after, as the Galicians won the first La Liga title in their history in 2000; on 6 February of that year, he only needed 21 minutes on the pitch after coming on as a substitute for Djalminha to contribute to a 5–2 home crushing of Real Madrid.

Flores then played for Real Valladolid, Mallorca and Ciudad Murcia – the latter in the second level – with very little impact. In 2004, the 33-year-old returned to Argentina with Independiente.

In 2006, while at Aldosivi in his homeland's division two, Flores announced his retirement from football only to join Lyn in Norway in March of the following year, being joined in that adventure by compatriot Matías Almeyda. While with the Oslo side he only played 45 minutes of a first-round cup match, and retired altogether shortly after.

== Coaching career ==
Flores returned to Vélez in 2009, being appointed Ricardo Gareca's assistant coach. On 26 December 2013, he became the manager.

== Honours ==
=== Player ===
Vélez

- Argentine Primera División: 1993 Clausura, 1995 Apertura, 1996 Clausura
- Copa Libertadores: 1994
- Intercontinental Cup: 1994
- Copa Interamericana: 1994
- Supercopa Sudamericana: 1996

Deportivo

- La Liga: 1999–2000
- Supercopa de España: 2000

Mallorca

- Copa del Rey: 2002–03

=== Manager ===
Vélez

- Supercopa Argentina: 2013
