= Fabián Cubero =

Argentine footballer (born 1978)

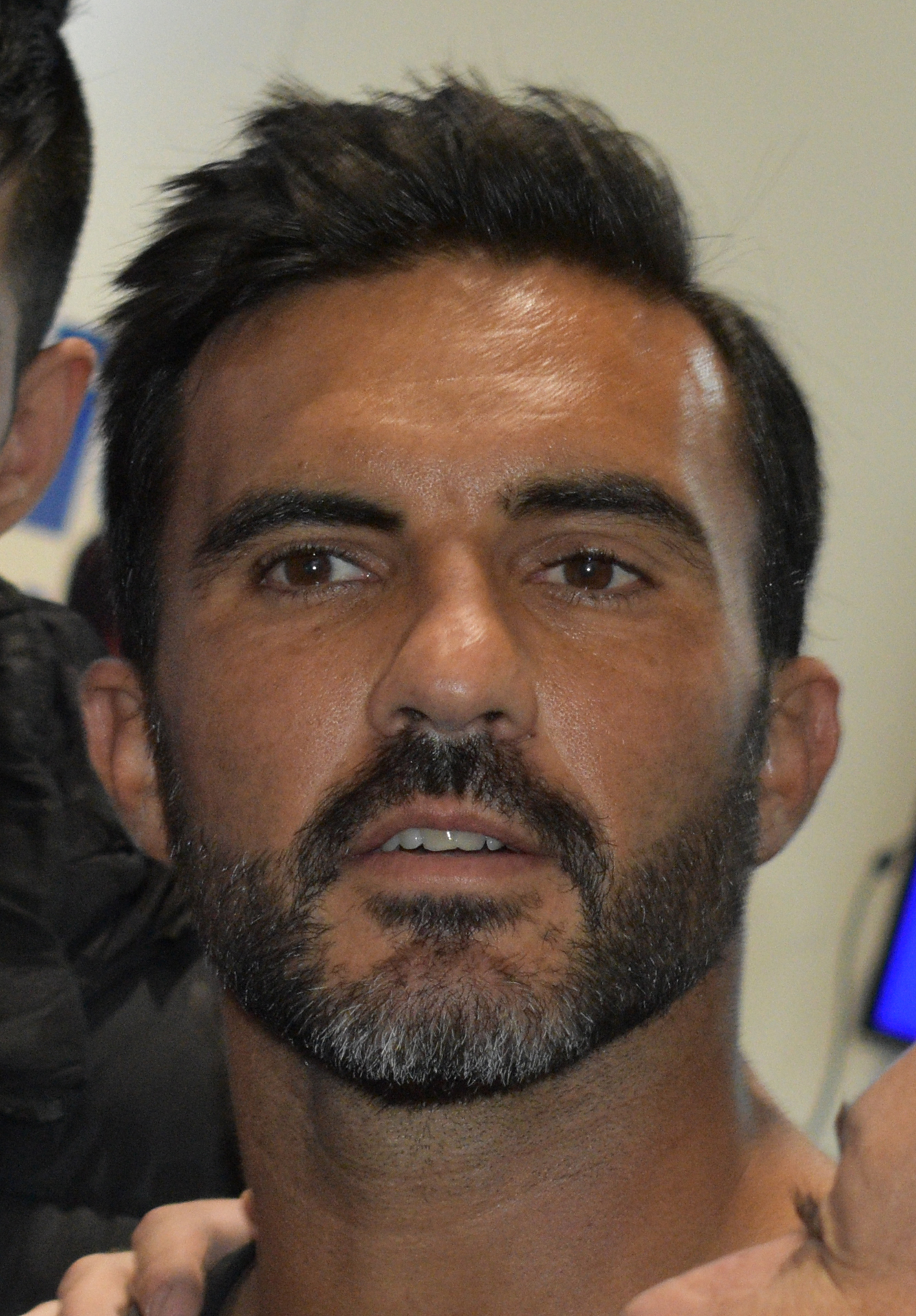

Personal information
- Full name: Fabián Alberto Cubero
- Date of birth: December 21, 1978 (age 47)
- Place of birth: Mar del Plata, Buenos Aires, Argentina
- Height: 1.76 m (5 ft 9 in)
- Positions: Right back; defensive midfielder; right winger; centre back

Youth career
- Cadetes de San Martín
- Almagro Florida
- Kimberley
- 1995: Renato Cesarini
- 1996: Vélez Sarsfield

Senior career*
Years	Team	Apps	(Gls)
1996–2007	Vélez Sarsfield	248	(8)
2007–2008	UANL	40	(0)
2008–2019	Vélez Sársfield	258	(10)

International career
1995	Argentina U17		
1997	Argentina U20		
- * Club domestic league appearances and goals

Fabián Alberto Cubero (born 21 December 1978) is an Argentine former professional footballer. A versatile player, Cubero started as a defensive midfielder but spent most of his career playing as a right back.

During his professional career that spanned more than twenty years, Cubero played predominantly for Vélez Sarsfield, winning five league titles with the team (spread over three different decades) and becoming the most capped player in the club's history (counting both domestic and international competitions). With seven, Cubero is the player with most local titles in the history of Vélez Sarsfield.

== Club career ==
Cubero started his professional career with Vélez Sarsfield in 1996. Under Marcelo Bielsa's coaching, he helped the team to win the 1998 Clausura league title, although he was not a regular in the first team. He was however a regular starter (mainly as right back, but sometimes also as defensive midfielder) in his team's 2005 Clausura winning campaign, where he also scored the first goal against Estudiantes de La Plata in a 3–0 victory that confirmed Vélez as champions. In 2007, Cubero was purchased by Tigres de la UANL of the Mexican Primera División.

After one year playing in Mexico, Cubero returned to Vélez Sarsfield for the 2008–09 Argentine Primera División season. He established as a starter as defensive midfielder during the Apertura tournament (first half of the season). However, when Ricardo Gareca took the manager position in Vélez for the Clausura tournament (second half of the season), Cubero started playing as right back. After Nicolás Cabrera and Darío Ocampo's injuries, Cubero played the last games of the season as right winger. He played a total of 17 games during Vélez' championship winning campaign, captaining the team during most of them.

On August 15, 2010, Cubero reached 300 professional games with Vélez (counting league and international competitions) during the 2010 Apertura second fixture win against All Boys. After winning his fourth Primera División title with Vélez in the 2011 Clausura, Cubero (already 32 years old) renewed his contract for another 3 years. During the 2012 Inicial, Cubero played his 457th official game with Vélez, equating Pedro Larraquy as the most capped player in the club's history, a record that he later surpassed. During that tournament, he also won his 5th league title with the team. Cubero was also a starter in Vélez's victories against Newell's Old Boys in the 2012–13 Superfinal (in which he was sent off) and against Arsenal de Sarandí in the 2013 Supercopa Argentina.

In 2014 Cubero reached his 22nd red card, achieving the record of being the player with most red cards in Argentina since short tournaments (starting in 1990).

On 9 September 2019, 41-year old Cubero announced that he would retire at the end of the year.

== International career ==
Cubero played with the Argentina national under-17 football team the 1995 FIFA U-17 World Championship, achieving a third-place finish, and was part of the under-20 squad that won the 1997 FIFA World Youth Championship held in Malaysia, both under José Pekerman's coaching.

== Personal life ==
Since 2008 until 2016, Cubero was married with Argentine model Nicole Neumann. They later had three daughters named Indiana, Allegra and Sienna.

He is also recognized for his high-pitched voice.

Cubero is nicknamed Poroto (in English: "bean").

== Honours ==
Vélez Sarsfield

- Argentine Primera División (6): 1998 Clausura, 2005 Clausura, 2009 Clausura, 2011 Clausura, 2012 Inicial, 2012–13 Superfinal
- Supercopa Argentina (1): 2013

Argentina U-20

- FIFA U-20 World Cup (1): 1997
