= Juan Urriolabeitía =

Argentine footballer

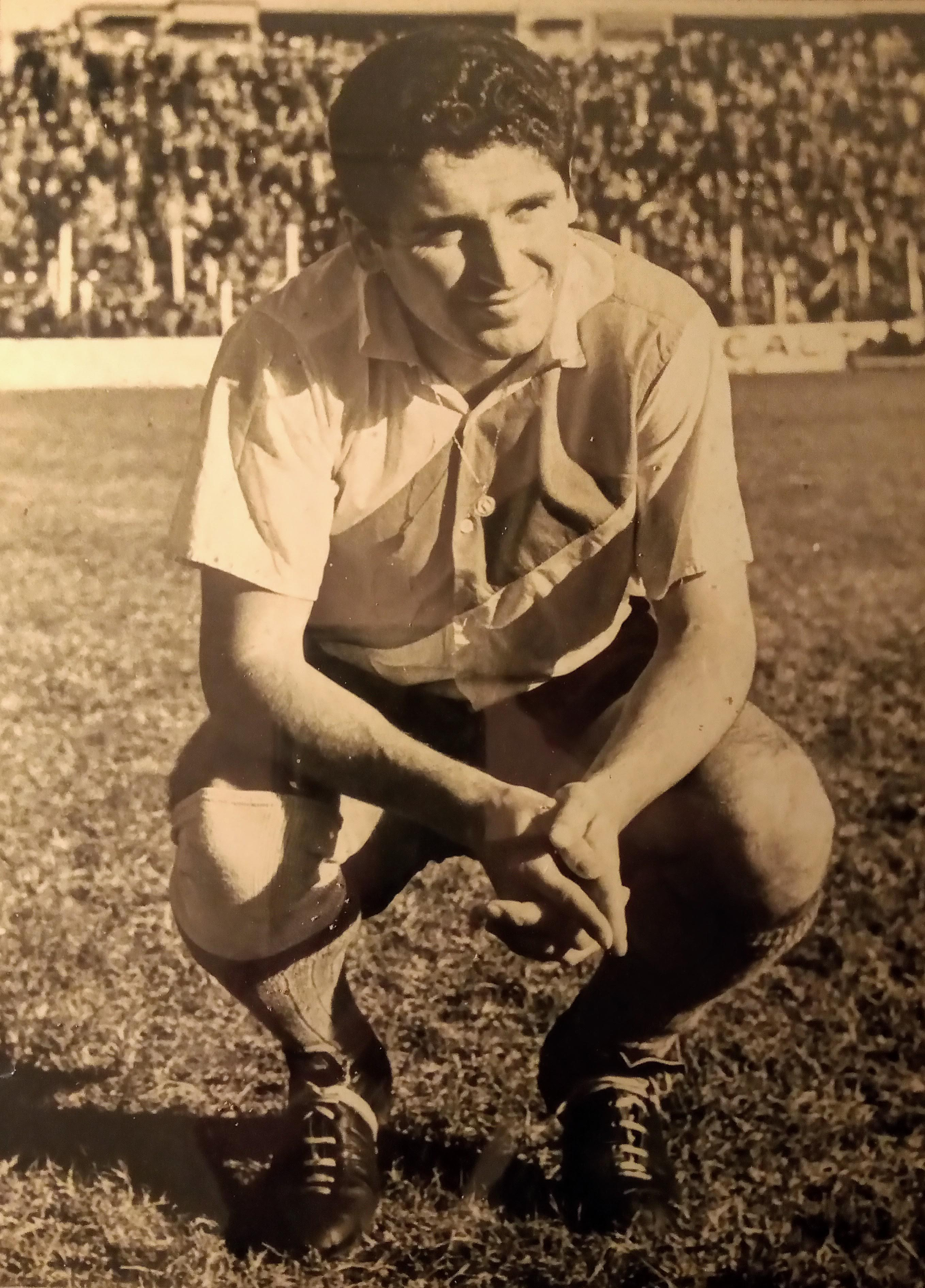
- Urriolabeitía with River Plate

Personal information
- Full name: Juan Eulogio Urriolabeitía
- Date of birth: 10 January 1931
- Place of birth: La Plata, Argentina
- Date of death: 1 November 1992 (aged 61)
- Place of death: La Plata, Argentina
- Position: Midfielder

Senior career*
Years	Team	Apps	(Gls)
1952–1956	Estudiantes de La Plata	56	(8)
1957–1960	River Plate	73	(3)
1961–1963	Deportivo Cali		
1964	Atlético Nacional	42	(19)
1965	América de Cali		

Managerial career
- 1966–1970: Estudiantes de La Plata (youth)
- 1970: Racing Club
- 1971–1972: Colón
- 1972: River Plate
- 1973: Newell's Old Boys
- 1974: Colón
- 1974–1975: Gimnasia y Esgrima
- 1975: Atlético Tucumán
- 1976: Vélez Sarsfield
- 1976: Millonarios
- 1977–1978: Colón
- 1978: Racing Club
- 1979: Estudiantes de La Plata
- 1982: Loma Negra
- 1983–1984: Independiente Santa Fe
- 1987: Atlético Tucumán
- * Club domestic league appearances and goals

Juan Eulogio Urriolabeitía (10 January 1931 – 1 November 1992) was an Argentine footballer and manager who played as a midfielder.

== Club career ==
Urriolabeitia made his debut with Estudiantes (LP) in 1952. He remained at the club until 1957, when he moved to River Plate. In his first year, Urriolabeitia won the 1957 Argentine Primera División. In 1959, he scored the winning goal in the first leg of the 1957 Copa Aldao. He left River Plate in 1960, and went on to play at Colombian clubs Deportivo Cali, Atlético Nacional and América de Cali.

== Managerial career ==
Urriolabeitia managed several teams in Argentina and Colombia. He most notably managed River Plate from 1972 to 1973, where he led the team to a runner-up campaign in the 1972 Torneo Nacional, and won the three Superclásico meetings during his tenure.

== Honours ==
=== Club ===
River Plate

- Argentine Primera División: 1957
