= Juan José Ferraro =

Argentine footballer and manager

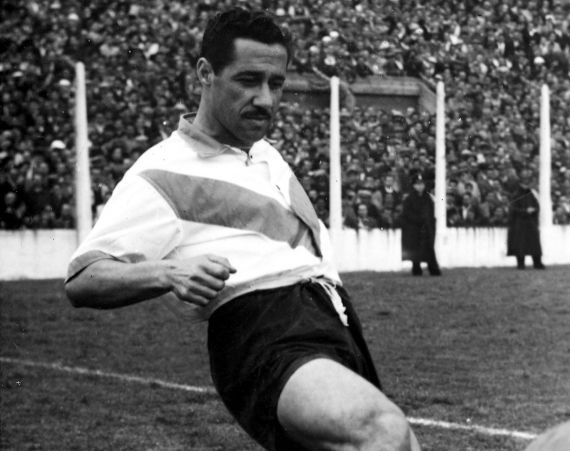

Personal information
- Full name: Juan José Ferraro
- Date of birth: 5 September 1923
- Place of birth: Argentina
- Date of death: 18 November 1973 (aged 50)
- Position: Centre forward

Senior career*
Years	Team	Apps	(Gls)
1943–1949	Vélez Sársfield	303	(157)
1949–1953	Boca Juniors	85	(32)
1953–1957	Vélez Sársfield	above	(above)
1958	Independiente Santa Fe	32	(19)
Total		428	(212)

International career
1940s–1950s	Argentina	8	(4)

Managerial career
- 1959: Independiente Santa Fe
- 1964: Vélez Sársfield
Medal record
Men's football
Representing Argentina
Copa América
Winner	1945 Chile
- * Club domestic league appearances and goals

Juan José Ferraro (5 September 1923 – 18 November 1973) was an Argentine footballer. He played mostly in his country for Vélez Sársfield, scoring 111 goals in 238 games with the team in the Argentine Primera División, and a total of 157 goals in 303 games (counting second division matches). Ferraro is the second top scorer in the club's history, behind Carlos Bianchi (who has 206 goals).

== Playing career ==
=== Club ===
Ferraro completed his youth career in Vélez Sársfield, and debuted with the team in the early 1940s. He holds the distinction of scoring the first goal in the Estadio José Amalfitani's history, in the inauguration friendly match that Vélez drew with River Plate 2–2. With Vélez, Ferraro played until 1949, helping the team return to the Argentine Primera División in 1943 by winning the second division championship.

In 1949, Ferraro joined Boca Juniors, who were struggling to avoid relegation from the first division. Boca paid a $500,000 Argentine peso fee, a record for Vélez at the time. The forward helped Boca avoid relegation, and stayed in the club until 1953, when he returned to Vélez. In total, he played 323 games and scored 143 goals in the Argentine Primera División with both clubs.

Towards the end of his career, he had his only experience outside Argentina, playing in Colombia for Independiente Santa Fe. There, he won the Colombian First Division in 1958.

=== National team ===
Ferraro played with the Argentina national team between 1945 and 1956, winning the 1945 South American Championship with his country.

== Coaching career ==
After retiring from Independiente Santa Fe, Ferraro took up manager duties in the club. He also coached Vélez Sársfield in 1964.

== Honours ==
=== Club ===
Vélez Sársfield

- Argentine Second Division: 1943

Independiente Santa Fe

- Colombian First Division: 1958

=== International ===
Argentina

- South American Championship: 1945

== Notes ==
1Total caps and goals in the club, accounted for both first and second division.
