= Santiago Ladino =

Argentine footballer

Personal information
- Full name: Santiago Andrés Ladino
- Date of birth: October 21, 1980 (age 46)
- Place of birth: Buenos Aires, Argentina
- Height: 1.75 m (5 ft 9 in)
- Position: Right back

Senior career*
Years	Team	Apps	(Gls)
2000–2006	Vélez Sársfield	101	(0)
2007	Lorca Deportiva	6	(0)
2007–2009	A.S. Bari	13	(0)
2009	Gimnasia de Jujuy	14	(0)
2009–2012	Banfield	64	(0)
2012–2013	Atlético Tucumán	29	(0)
2013–2014	All Boys	14	(0)
- * Club domestic league appearances and goals

Santiago Andrés Ladino (born 21 October 1980 in Buenos Aires) is an Argentine football player.

== Career ==
Ladino started his professional career with Vélez Sársfield in 2000. He was part of the championship winning squad in the Clausura 2005 tournament. In 2006, after making 116 appearances for Vélez in all competitions he joined Lorca Deportiva in Spain.

On the last day of the August 2007 transfer window, he left Lorca to join Bari.

On 31 July 2009 Club Atlético Banfield signed the wingback on loan from Gimnasia de Jujuy where he was member of the squad that won the Apertura 2009 championship appearing in 6 games. On 13 December 2009 he celebrated with his team mates when Banfield won the Argentine championship for the first time in the history of the club.

== Honours ==
Vélez Sársfield

- Primera División Argentina (1): 2005 Clausura

Banfield

- Primera División Argentina (1): 2009 Apertura
