= Club Atlético Vélez Sarsfield =

Argentine sports club

Vélez Sarsfield
- Full name: Club Atlético Vélez Sarsfield
- Nickname: El Fortín (The Fort)
- Founded: 1 January 1910; 116 years ago
- Ground: Estadio José Amalfitani
- Capacity: 49,540
- Chairman: Fabián Berlanga
- Manager: Guillermo Barros Schelotto
- League: Primera División
- 2025: 16th of 30
- Website: velezsarsfield.com.ar
Home colours	Away colours	Third colours

Club Atlético Vélez Sarsfield (Spanish pronunciation: [ˈsaɾfil]) is an Argentine sports club based in Liniers, Buenos Aires. Its football team plays in Primera División, the highest level of the Argentine league system. Founded in 1910, the club has spent most of its history in the top tier of Argentine football. The club's home ground is the 49,540-capacity José Amalfitani Stadium, where they have played since 1951.

One of the most successful clubs in Argentine football, Vélez Sarsfield had their first major success in 1968, when they won the league championship, and subsequently made regular seasons between 1970 and 1990. The club have enjoyed their greatest period of success in the past three decades, winning 17 trophies since 1993. Domestically, Vélez have won eleven Primera División titles, while in continental competitions have won five international cups (including both the Copa Libertadores and the Intercontinental Cup). It is one of eight teams to have won CONMEBOL's treble.

Vélez Sarsfield's regular kit colours are white shirts and shorts, with some details in blue. The club's crest has been changed several times in attempts to re-brand the club and modernise its image. It is one of the most supported clubs in Argentina. Apart from football the club takes part in other sports such as athletics, basketball, gymnastics, handball, field hockey, martial arts, tennis, roller skating and volleyball.

== History ==
=== The beginning ===
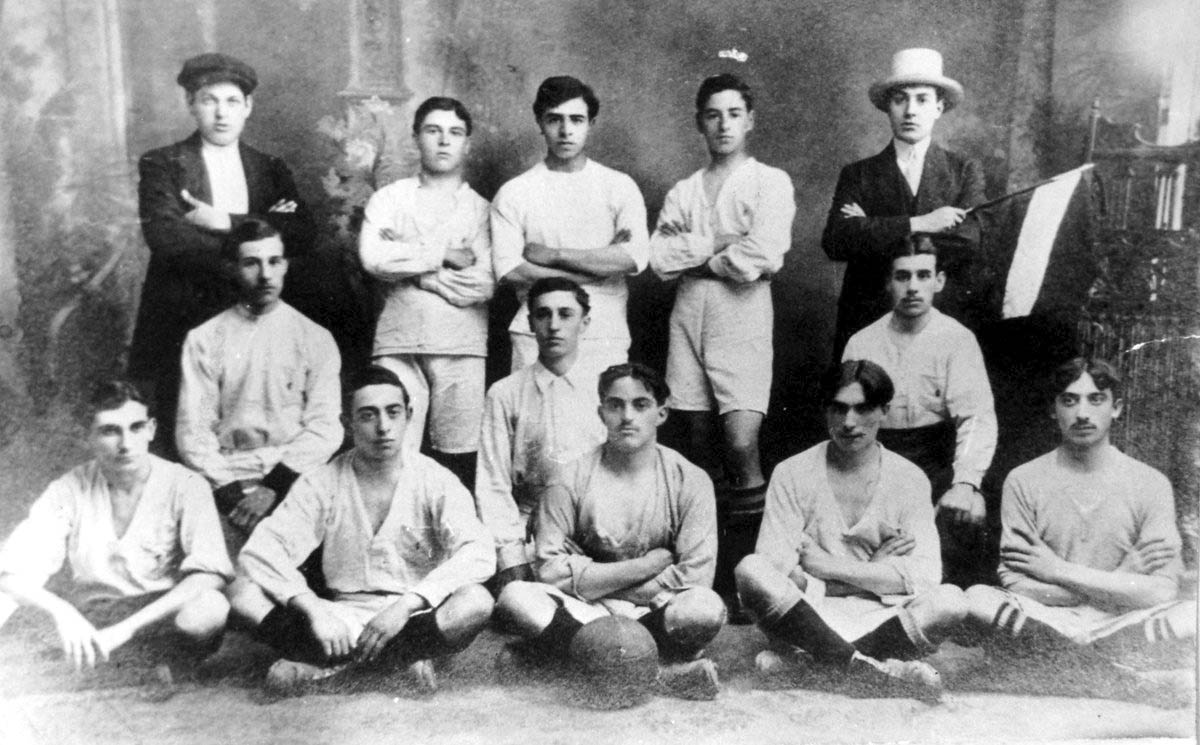
Vélez Sarsfield team of 1910

Vélez foundation dates back to the last days of 1909, when rain interrupted an informal football game played near the Vélez Sarsfield railway station of the Buenos Aires Western Railway, which served the barrio of Vélez Sársfield, named after jurist Dalmacio Vélez Sarsfield (Vélez Sarsfield station is in Floresta barrio and was renamed Floresta station in 1944). Three of the young men whose game got interrupted, Julio Guglielmone, Martín Portillo and Nicolás Marín Moreno, sheltered in the station and discussed the possibility of founding a football club to practice the sport more seriously. The club was officially founded on 1 January 1910, in Marín Moreno's house. The founders decided to call the new club Club Atlético Argentinos de Vélez Sarsfield (lit. 'Argentines of Vélez Sarsfield Athletic Club'), and appointed Luis Barredo as their first chairman.

Dalmacio Vélez Sarsfield was a descendant of the Irish patriot and exile Patrick Sarsfield, 1st Earl of Lucan, from whom the name Sarsfield is derived. Like their Buenos Aires rivals, Boca Juniors, the Vélez Sarsfield sports club hence trace their roots to an Irish connection from an era when the Irish Argentines community, including Dalmacio, was at its zenith.

The founders of Vélez Sarsfield sports club chose to form two teams (one for the Argentine third division and the other for the fourth) and chose to sport white shirts, that were easy to obtain for everyone. In 1912, however, the directive board decided to change the uniform to navy blue shirts and white shorts. Vélez Sarsfield first home ground was a piece of land located between the streets of Ensenada, Provincias Unidas (currently Juan Bautista Alberdi), Mariano Acosta and Convención (currently José Bonifacio). This block is in Floresta barrio, where it meets Vélez Sársfield and Parque Avellaneda barrios.

=== First steps in the league ===
Vélez affiliated to the Argentine Football Association (AFA) in 1912. Nonetheless, on 5 September, the board decided to disaffiliate the club from AFA and affiliate it to the recently created Federación Argentina de Football (FAF), citing as reason AFA's detrimental attitude towards the club. In that same year, the team was strengthened by the joining of some former players of San Lorenzo de Almagro, who had left that club due to its internal problems. With this help, Vélez reached the Federation's second division championship final on their first year of affiliation, losing 2–4 to Tigre in GEBA's ground.

On 7 February 1913, 10 new people were accepted as members of the club. Among them was José Amalfitani, who later would go on to be club president for 30 years. Subsequently, on 23 November, the board of directors decided to shorten the club's name, eliminating the term "Argentinos" and leaving the club with its current name: "Club Atlético Vélez Sarsfield". The board also decided that players from the different teams had to contribute an initial membership fee of $1 Argentine pesos, plus a monthly $0.50 of the same coin. In that year, Vélez rented a terrain in the neighbourhood of Mataderos known as Quinta de Figallo, located in the Tapalqué street, between Escalada and Chascomús streets. This new ground had the advantage that a wind mill could provide water for the dressing rooms. The club's stay in Mataderos was short however, as they moved again in 1914, this time to the neighbourhood of Villa Luro. There, they bought a terrain between the streets of Bacacay, Víctor Hugo and Cortina, and the Maldonado Stream (parallel to what today is the Gaona avenue).

In 1915, Vélez re-affiliated to AFA after the disappearance of FAF. One year later, on 14 March, and owing to the great number of members of the club who were Italian immigrants, the kit was changed again. The new colours adopted were green, red and white, the colours of the Italian flag. From then on the club played in green, red and white stripes. During the decade, the team fought to achieve promotion to Primera División, the Association's first division. On 2 December 1917, Vélez lost the Intermedia (second division) final to Defensores de Belgrano in GEBA's ground. The club regularly took part in the Copa de Competencia Jockey Club, in which both first and second division teams could compete. In 1919, however, Vélez left AFA in protest of alleged discriminatory policies that hindered the club's prospects of achieving promotion. Another 6 teams protested against these maneuvers and were expelled from the Association, while another 7 were expelled for protesting the expulsion of the first 6. All together, the expelled clubs formed a rival association, the Asociación Amateurs de Football (AAF).

=== Primera División ===
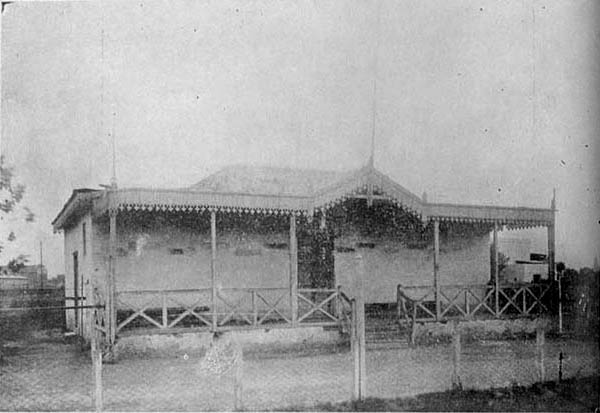
Grandstands of the first Vélez Sarsfield stadium, in 1922

Therefore, in 1919 Vélez competed in the first division for the first time in their history, in the AAF's inaugural season. The team played their first game against Independiente, winning 2–1 with two goals scored by Martín Salvarredi. On their debut season, the club finished as runner-up, behind Racing Club, who were seven times consecutive champions of AFA's league. During the campaign, Vélez won 9 games, drew 2 and lost 2; scoring 21 goals and conceding 8.

The most frequent line-up was: Acacio Caballero, Atilio Braneri, Atilio Barderacco, Miguel Fontana, José Luis Boffi, Julio Giachi, Juan Bru, Humberto Bassadone, Marcelino Martínez, Martín Salvarredi, Alberto Granara.

Vélez made its debut in Primera División playing at dissident Asociación Amateurs de Football in 1919, where the team finished 2nd to Racing. The following championship Vélez finished 6th, and team's forward Salvador Carreras was the first player of the club to become top scorer in an Argentine league. In 1921, José Luis Boffi became the first player of the club to represent the Argentina national football team, playing against Chile in Valparaíso, a game which Argentina won 4–1.

On 13 March 1923, José Amalfitani was elected president of the club for his first two-year period. One year later, the club rent a new field to establish its home ground, staying in the neighbourhood of Villa Luro, but this time in the intersection of the streets Basualdo, Schmidel, Pizarro and Guardia Nacional. The stadium's main wood stand was finished in November of that year, and was inaugurated on 16 March 1924, in a 2–2 draw with River Plate (Vélez' scorer was Ángel Sobrino).

Four years later, in 1928, the Basualdo St. stadium hosted the first night game in Argentine football history, between the Argentina Olympic national team (silver medalist in that year's Olympics) and a team formed by players from the AAF's league. The Olympic team won 3–1, with goals by Roberto Cherro, Manuel Ferreira and Cesáreo Onzari for the Olympics, and Manuel Seoane for the AAF.

Vélez Sarsfield was also the first Argentine football team to have a manager. The job was held by Luis Martín Castellano (a physical education teacher) from 1928 to 1936.

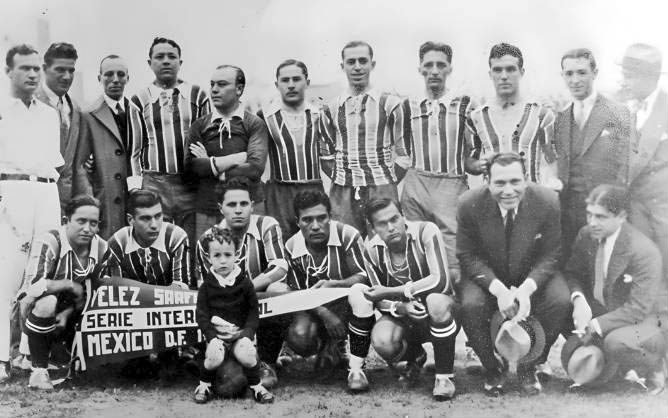
Vélez before a match played in México City during the Pan-American tour of 1930–31

Between 1930 and 1931, Vélez made a Pan-American tour playing against teams from Chile, Peru, Cuba, Mexico and the United States. The team played a total 25 games, winning 20, drawing 4, and losing 1 (against Fall River in Rhode Island); scoring 84 goals and conceding 32. The team was formed with 17 players, 10 from the club and another 7 loaned freely by other teams, a common practice during the amateur era. The club's players were: Celio Caucia, Eleuterio Forrester, Manuel de Sáa, Alfredo Sánchez, Rodolfo Devoto, Norberto Arroupe, Saúl Quiroga, Alberto Álvarez, Eduardo Spraggón and Ernesto Garbini; while the loaned players were Fernando Paternoster (Racing Club), Bernabé Ferreyra (Tigre), Francisco Varallo (Gimnasia y Esgrima La Plata), Carlos Volante (Platense), Gerónimo Díaz and Agustín Peruch (both from Newell's Old Boys) and Alberto Chividini (Central Norte de Tucumán). Varallo (who had played the inaugural World Cup previously that year) and Ferreyra (who was later sold by Tigre to River Plate) were the top scorers, scoring 16 and 38 goals respectively.

In 1931, Vélez Sarsfield and another 17 clubs broke away from the official AFA league (that remained amateur) to form the Liga Argentina de Football, the first professional league in Argentine football. The team debuted on the first fixture of the 1931 inaugural championship, in a 0–1 defeat to Platense. Vélez would eventually finish the competition in the 9th place.

Will San Lorenzo be able to defeat Villa Luro's Fortín tomorrow?

— Hugo Marini, Crítica, 13 September 1932

In 1932, the club's nickname el Fortín (in English: "the Small Fort") was coined by journalist Hugo Marini (Crítica) in reference to the club's Villa Luro stadium, to describe Vélez strength while playing at home. Vélez had a 24 games unbeaten run at the old Villa Luro stadium between 1934 and 1935. However, the club's home unbeaten record of 28 games was achieved at the current Liniers stadium, the José Amalfitani Stadium, between 1967 and 1969.

In 1933, the club changed their kit to the present colors, when a sports-equipment merchant offered a white jerseys with a blue "V" on the chest ordered by a rugby union team that had not claimed them. The new design has remained unchanged to the present day, replacing the red, white and green shirt used since 1915. However, Vélez has used the original Italian flag colors in alternate jerseys throughout their history. On 1935, Agustín Cosso became the first Vélez' player in the professional era to become Primera División top scorer. During the following year, Vélez toured South America again, playing games in Chile, Peru and Brazil.

=== Relegation and return ===
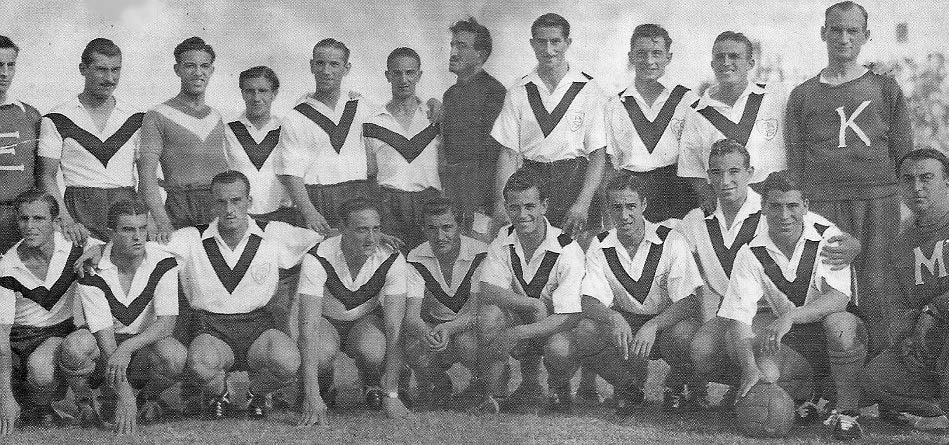
The 1943 team that won the Primera B title and returned to Primera División.

During the 1940 season, Vélez was relegated from the first division for the only time to date. Vélez finished penultimate, one point behind Atlanta that defeated Independiente on their final fixture for 6–4 (being 6–0 at the end of the first half, on a match suspected to be fixed). With the club on the second division, it entered a crisis and was forced to vacate the stadium's lot. José Amalfitani returned to the club's presidency, and eventually the team moved to the Liniers neighbourhood.

Vélez stayed three seasons in the second division, returning to the Primera División in 1943 after winning the Segunda División championship on the category's first professional season. Vélez confirmed the championship on 20 November by defeating Dock Sud 5–2 at home at Ferro Carril Oeste's stadium. The team's manager during the season was the former club captain Victorio Spinetto, while Juan José Ferraro was the top goal scorer. During that same 1943, the club inaugurated the Liniers' stadium on the ground over the Maldonado Stream, the same spot where now stands the subsequently rebuild José Amalfitani Stadium. On 1945, Vélez achieved its biggest win in history by defeating Independiente 8–0 (goals from di Bella (3), Scliar (3), Bottini and Cano).

That team was formed by Miguel Ángel Rugilo, Héctor Cuenya, Blas Angrisano, Armando Ovide, Víctor Curuchet, Héctor Herrero, Marco Aurelio, Eduardo Heisecke, Juan José Ferraro, Ángel Fernández and Alfredo Bermúdez, being Victorio Spinetto the coach. Other players were Osvaldo Bottini, Jorge Cano, Alfredo Costa, Salvador di Bella, Emilio Díaz, Simón Fredotivich, Adriano Garrone, Luis Orué, Pedro Perrota, José Puisari, and José Scorzo.

=== Decade of 1950s ===
During 1949, Vélez' goalkeeper Miguel Ángel Rugilo, formed at the club's youth divisions, saved 5 penalty kicks in 5 consecutive games. Moreover, in 1950, he saved two penalties in a match against River Plate. The club's player represented Argentina 5 times, most notably in a 1–2 away defeat by England at Wembley. Despite the defeat, journalist Luis Elías Sojit nicknamed him El León de Wembley (The Lion of Wembley) for his performance.

On 22 April 1951, Vélez reinaugurated the Liniers' stadium, rebuild to be almost entirely made of cement. On the reinauguration, the team defeated Huracán 2–0 with goals by Raúl Nápoli.

On the 1953 championship, Vélez Sarsfield was runner-up for the first time in the professional era of Argentine football, finishing 4-point behind River Plate. The team was coached by Victorio Spinetto (the same who had achieved promotion in 1943), and had a strong forward quintet formed by Norberto Conde, Ernesto Sansone, Juan José Ferraro, Osvaldo Zubeldía, and Juan Carlos Mendiburu. Conde was subsequently Argentine Primera División top scorer in the 1954 season. The line-up in those years was: Nicolás Adamo, Oscar Antonio Huss, Ángel Allegri, Armando Ovide, Jorge Ruiz, Rafael García Fierro, Norberto Conde, Ernesto Sansone, Juan José Ferraro, Osvaldo Zubeldía and Juan Carlos Mendiburu, coached by Victorio Spinetto. The rest of the squad were Juan Carlos Cerretani, Emilio Espinoza, Argentino Geronazzo, Roberto Iglesias, Pablo Mallegni, Joaquín Martínez, Carlos Sardá and José Viglienghi. On May 24, 1959, the first official change of goalkeeper in a First Division match took place, when at 45 minutes, Floreal Rodríguez replaced Roque Marrapodi at the Velez Sarsfield fence, in a 1–0 defeat against San Lorenzo in the gasometer of Avenida La Plata.

=== First championship ===
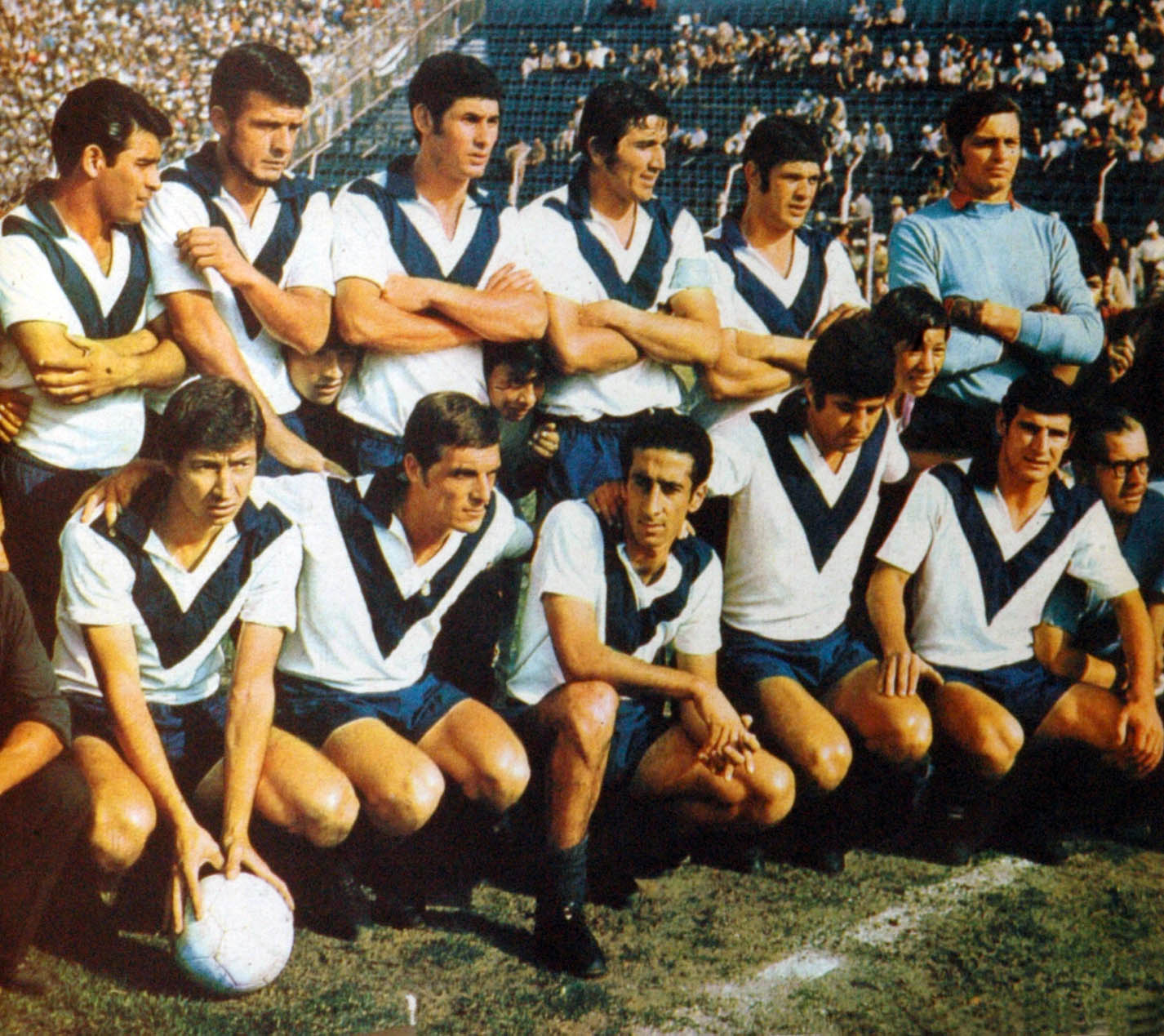
The team of 1968, which won the first Primera División championship it club's history

During the 1960s decade, Vélez finished among the top positioned teams in the 1966 championship (5th), the 1967 Metropolitano (3rd in its group) 1967 Nacional (3rd), and the 1968 Metropolitano (1st in its group and eliminated in the semi-finals by Estudiantes de La Plata). Moreover, in 1965 the team's striker Juan Carlos Carone finished as the league's top scorer.

Vélez Sarsfield clinched its first national championship on the 1968 Nacional. Coached by Manuel Giúdice, the team finished first on the final league standings, sharing the position with River Plate and Racing Club. Therefore, the three teams had to play a championship playoff, where Vélez drew 1–1 with River (goal by José Luis Luna) and defeated Racing 4–2 (goals by Omar Wehbe (3) and Roberto Moreyra). Vélez finished tied with River, who had defeated Racing 2–0, in both points and goal difference. However, Vélez won the championship for having more goals for in the regular championship (39, over River's 35). During this tournament, Vélez also achieved its biggest victory in official matches, 11–0 against Huracán de Bahía Blanca. Moreover, Omar Wehbe was league top scorer with 16 goals. In total, the team played 17 games, winning 11, drawing 3, and losing another 3; with 44 goals for and 17 against.

The 1968 champion line up was: Miguel Marín, Luis Gregorio Gallo, Iselín Santos Ovejero, Luis Atela, Eduardo Zóttola, Alberto Ríos, Roberto Moreyra, José Solórzano, Daniel Willington, José Luis Luna, Omar Wehbe, Carlos Bianchi, Mario Nogara. Manuel Giúdice was the coach, and the rest of the roster were Osvaldo Biaggio, Carlos Caballero, Juan Carlos Carone, Juan Manuel Gómez, Roque Nieva, Jorge Pérez, Néstor Sinatra, and Carlos Zeballos.

Vélez would have played its first international tournament in the 1969 Copa Libertadores, however the club refused to play for economic reasons. The team did however play internationally during the decade, both a friendly against Pelé's Santos (played in the José Amalfitani Stadium to re-inaugurate the lighting systems), and a friendly tournament in Montevideo, Uruguay against Nacional, Torpedo Moscow, and Sparta Prague. During the final tournament of the decade, Vélez finished 3rd in its group in the 1969 Metropolitano.

=== 1970s and 1980s ===
During the 1970 Nacional, Vélez came 3rd in its group and was unable to challenge the title (only the first two of each group advanced to the semi-finals). One year later, on the 1971 Metropolitano, the team came second to Independiente after losing its first place on the last two fixtures of the championship (1–2 defeats with Racing and Huracán). On both of the mentioned championships, Vélez' striker Carlos Bianchi was the overall top scorer.

The club also had good participation in the 1972 Nacional (3rd in its group), 1973 Nacional (again 3rd in its group), 1974 Nacional (first in its group and 3rd in the final tournament group), 1977 Metropolitano (3rd overall), and 1978 Nacional (2nd in its group and eliminated by River Plate).

Vélez was again runner-up in the 1979 Metropolitano, after losing the tournament final with River Plate. In that year's Nacional, the team was first in its group but was again eliminated by River Plate (this time in the quarter-finals through a penalty shootout). Vélez did however defeat Unión in the runners-up play-off to define the second team qualified for the Copa Libertadores.

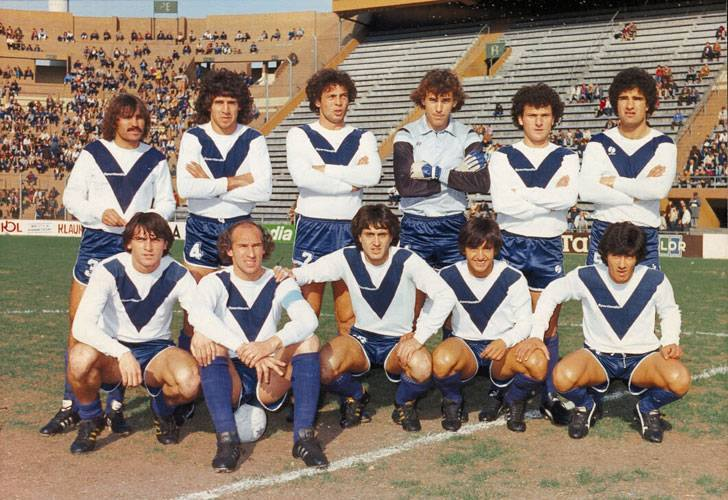
Team of Vélez Sársfield in 1983: Bujedo, Moralejo, Jorge, Pumpido, Cuciuffo, Larraquy; (down): Nannini, Bianchi, Alonso, Vanemerak, Comas

Vélez started the year 1980 by playing its first Copa Libertadores. The team came first on its group (over River Plate and Peruvians Sporting Cristal and Atlético Chalaco), but was eliminated in the semifinals (ending last its group behind Brazilian Internacional and Colombian América de Cali).

In the local league, Vélez reached the semi-finals of the 1981 Nacional, where it was eliminated by Ferro Carril Oeste. Vélez' striker Carlos Bianchi, who had returned to the club after a period in French football, was for the third time league top scorer. Subsequently, the club was third in its group in the 1982 Nacional, and fifth in the 1982 Metropolitano. The following season, Vélez' was eliminated in the round of 16 of the 1983 Nacional, and came fourth in the 1983 Metropolitano, 4 points behind champions Independiente.

The team was again runner-up of the Argentine Primera División during the 1985 Nacional, losing the final to Argentinos Juniors. Vélez striker Jorge Comas was the tournament's top scorer with 12 goals.

=== The beginning of greatness ===
The 1990s started with Vélez finishing third in the 1990 Apertura tournament. In the last fixture of the championship, Vélez defeated River Plate 2–1 (goals from Ricardo Gareca and Esteban González) at the Monumental, thwarting River's chances of winning the title. Vélez goalkeeper, former Argentine international Ubaldo Fillol, saved a penalty kick during the game, and retired at the age of 41. The 1990–91 season also saw the team's striker Esteban González finish as league top scorer, with 18 goals. Subsequently, the club finished fourth in the 1991 Apertura and second in the 1992 Clausura.

In December 1992, former striker Carlos Bianchi was appointed as the club's manager. Bianchi, who had been league champion and three times top scorer with the team, had no coaching experience in Argentine football. In his first tournament as manager (the 1993 Clausura), Vélez won the Argentine Primera División title after 25 years. The championship was defined in the penultimate fixture (8 June), when the team drew 1–1 with Estudiantes de La Plata (with goalkeeper José Luis Chilavert scoring his first goal in Vélez). The team played 19 games, winning 10, drawing 7 and losing 2, with 23 goals for and 7 against. Its most frequent line-up was: José Luis Chilavert, Héctor Almandoz, Roberto Trotta, Víctor Hugo Sotomayor, Raúl Cardozo, José Basualdo, Marcelo Gómez, Christian Bassedas, Walter Pico, José Oscar Flores, Omar Asad and Esteban González. Carlos Bianchi was the coach, and the roster was also formed by Mariano Armentano, Horacio Bidevich, Patricio Camps, Carlos Campagnucci, Juan Carlos Docabo, Cecilio Galeano, Claudio Husaín, Mauricio Pellegrino, Martín Posse, Leonardo Ramos, Fabián Vázquez and Sergio Zárate. On that year's Apertura, the team was runner-up, one point behind River Plate. Vélez played the last games of the tournament with substitutes, as they were already participating in the 1994 Copa Libertadores (the 1993 Apertura finished in February 1994).

=== International titles ===
On 31 August 1994, in the club's second participation in the Copa Libertadores, they won the title by defeating defending champions São Paulo in the final. The first series final was played at the José Amalfitani Stadium, with Vélez winning 1–0 (goal by Omar Asad). The return game was played at the Estádio do Morumbi, with São Paulo winning by the same margin. The champion had to be defined via penalty shootout, with Vélez winning 5–3 (the last penalty was scored by Roberto Pompei).

On its way to the championship, the team had finished first in their group, ahead Boca Juniors (with results of 1–1 and 2–1), and Brazilians Palmeiras (1–0 and 1–4) and Cruzeiro (1–1 and 2–0). Subsequently, Vélez had defeated Uruguayan Defensor Sporting in the round of 16 (1–1 and 0–0, 4–3 in penalties), Venezuelan Minervén in the quarter-finals (0–0 and 2–0) and Colombian Junior in the semi-finals (1–2 and 2–1, 5–4 in penalties).

As Copa Libertadores champion, Vélez played the 1994 Intercontinental Cup in Tokyo, Japan, facing Italian side AC Milan (winner of the 1993–94 UEFA Champions League). On 1 December 1994, Vélez defeated Milan 2–0, with goals from Roberto Trotta (from a penalty kick at the 5th minute of the second half), and Omar Asad (13th minute of the second half), successfully becoming club world champion for the first time in history. Moreover, Asad was selected as the game's best player, and was awarded an automobile from Toyota, the tournament's sponsor. The team was formed by the same players that had won the domestic title, with Roberto Pompei replacing Pico. Other players of the roster were Mariano Armentano, Patricio Camps, Carlos Campagnucci, Juan Carlos Docabo, Federico Domínguez, Esteban González, Sandro Guzmán, Claudio Husaín, Guillermo Morigi, Martín Posse, Ricardo Rentera, Flavio Zandoná and Marcelo Herrera.

Among the starting eleven of the Intercontinental Cup title, 7 players and the manager were from the club's youth divisions (Almandoz, Asad, Bassedas, Cardozo, Flores, Gómez, Pompei and Bianchi).

Subsequently, the team came third in the 1994 Apertura and in the 1995 Clausura. In this last championship, Turu Flores was the top scorer, with 14 goals. The club won its third national championship in the 1995 Apertura, finishing 6 points above runner-up Racing Club. Vélez won the last 6 games of the tournament, including a 3–0 away victory over Independiente in the final fixture (goals by Roberto Trotta (p.k.), Patricio Camps and José Basualdo). The team played 19 games, winning 13, drawing 2 and losing 4; with 29 goals for and 13 against.

On 24 February 1996, Vélez won its third international competition by defeating Costa Rican Cartaginés in the Copa Interamericana (0–0 away and 2–0 at home, with goals by José Oscar Flores). During that year, the team also won the 1996 Clausura, finishing one point above Gimnasia y Esgrima La Plata. By winning successively the Apertura and Clausura of the 1995–96 season, Vélez became the sixth club in the Argentine professional football history to win two championships in a row. Osvaldo Piazza, a former club player, replaced Carlos Bianchi as coach for the last four fixtures of the season. In total, Vélez won 11 games, drew 7 and lost 1, scoring 40 goals and allowing 18.

Under Piazza's coaching, Vélez won the 1996 Supercopa Sudamericana unbeaten, defeating Grêmio (3–3 and 1–0), Olimpia (3–0 and 1–0), Santos (1–0 and 2–0) and Cruzeiro (1–0 and 2–0). With 4 goals, Patricio Camps was the tournament's top scorer.

On 13 April 1997, the team won the Recopa Sudamericana, defeating River Plate 4–2 in the penalty shootout, after drawing in the regular time 1–1 (goal by José Luis Chilavert, from a penalty kick). This was Vélez's 5th and, to date, last international championship.

After the Recopa, Vélez finished fifth in the 1997 Clausura and fourth in the 1997 Apertura. Subsequently, under Marcelo Bielsa's coaching, the club won their fifth national championship by finishing first in the 1998 Clausura, 6 points above runner-up Lanús. Vélez secured the championship in the penultimate fixture, with a 1–0 home win over Huracán (goal by Martín Posse). The team played 19 games, winning 14, drawing 4 and losing 1; with 39 goals for and 14 against.

=== 2000–present ===
During the first years of the 2000s decade, Vélez was unable to finish in the league's top positions until the 2003 Clausura, when the team finished third behind River Plate (champion) and Boca Juniors. In the 2004 Clausura, striker Rolando Zárate was league top scorer with 13 goals, and in the 2004 Apertura Vélez was again runner-up. The team finished two points behind Newell's Old Boys, after drawing 1–1 in the last fixture with Arsenal de Sarandí.

In the following championship, the 2005 Clausura, Vélez won their 6th national championship. The team finished 6 points above Banfield, effectively winning the tournament in the penultimate fixture, after defeating Estudiantes de La Plata 3–0 (goals by Fabián Cubero, Rolando Zárate and Lucas Castromán). Vélez was coached by Miguel Ángel Russo, and had a team formed mostly by players formed in the club's youth divisions, who averaged 25 years of age. In the starting eleven, only Gastón Sessa and Fabricio Fuentes were not from Vélez' youths. The team played 19 games in total, winning 11, drawing 6 and losing 2, scoring 32 goals and allowing 14.

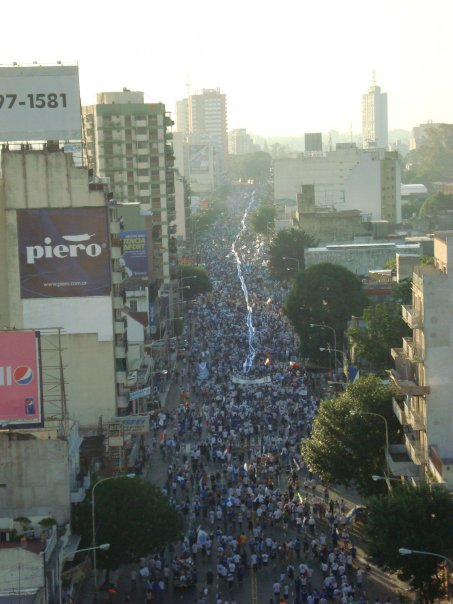
The club's fans celebrating Vélez' 100th anniversary

The team's lineup was: Sessa; Cubero, Fuentes, Maximiliano Pellegrino, Ariel Broggi/Marcelo Bustamante; Jonás Gutiérrez, Leandro Somoza, Marcelo Bravo; Leandro Gracián; Castromán and Rolando Zárate. Other players who played regularly for the first team during the tournament were Juan Manuel Martínez, Santiago Ladino, Maximiliano Bustos, Emanuel Centurión, Hernán Pellerano and Mauro Zárate, among others.

Vélez subsequently finished third in the 2005 Apertura, reached the semi-finals of the 2005 Copa Sudamericana and the quarter-finals in the 2006 Copa Libertadores. In the 2006 Apertura, Mauro Zárate was the 13th player in the club's history to finish as Argentine Primera top scorer (counting both professional and amateur eras), sharing the honour with Rodrigo Palacio.

By the end of 2008, Christian Bassedas, former player of the club during the successful 1990s era, was appointed as director of football; while Ricardo Gareca, former club player in the late 1980s and early 1990s, was contracted as manager. In the first tournament under Gareca's coaching, Vélez became Argentine league champion for the seventh time in history, by winning the 2009 Clausura. In the final fixture of the tournament, the team played against Huracán (who was first, one point above Vélez) at home, winning 1–0 (goal by Maximiliano Moralez) and therefore securing the championship. In total, the team won 11 games, drew 7 and lost 1, scoring 29 goals and allowing 13. Moreover, goalkeeper Germán Montoya was awarded the Ubaldo Matildo Fillol Award for having the lowest goals-to-games ratio in the tournament. The starting eleven for the final against Huracán was: Montoya; Gastón Díaz, Sebastián Domínguez, Nicolás Otamendi, Emiliano Papa; Cubero, Franco Razzotti, Víctor Zapata; Moralez; Juan Manuel Martínez and Hernán Rodrigo López. Other players who took part of the first team squad during the tournament were Jonathan Cristaldo (who could not play the last fixture due to an injury), Joaquín Larrivey, Nicolás Cabrera (who was a starter until he suffered a knee injury in the fifth fixture), Darío Ocampo, Waldo Ponce, Roberto Nanni, Leandro Coronel and Ariel Cabral, among others. Captain Leandro Somoza was out for the entire tournament due to an injury.

During the 2009–10 season Vélez Sarsfield contributed with 8 players to the different South American national teams: 6 for Argentina (Emiliano Papa, Nicolás Otamendi –who went on to play the 2010 FIFA World Cup–, Sebastián Domínguez, Jonathan Cristaldo, Gastón Díaz and Franco Razzotti), one for Chile (Waldo Ponce) and one for Uruguay (Hernán Rodrigo López).

On 1 January 2010 the club's fans celebrated Vélez' 100th anniversary by marching from Floresta to the José Amalfitani Stadium in Liniers. A group of more than 50,000 people took part of the celebration.

During 2010, the team's best tournament was in the Apertura, in which they were runners-up. Vélez made a 43-points campaign, 3 more than in their latest Clausura championship, but finished 2 points behind Estudiantes de La Plata. In that tournament, the Uruguayan forward Santiago Silva was the joint-top scorer, while goalkeeper Marcelo Barovero won the Ubaldo Fillol Award, conceding only 6 goals.

On the first semester of 2011, Vélez contested both the national championship and the Copa Libertadores. In the latter, after qualifying second in their group, they defeated LDU Quito in the round of 16 and Libertad in the quarter-finals with overall scores of 5–0 and 7–2 respectively. Vélez reached the semi-finals for the first time since 1994, however, they were eliminated by Peñarol on away goals rule, after losing 0–1 in Montevideo and winning 2–1 in Buenos Aires. In this second match, Vélez' forward Santiago Silva missed a penalty with the game 2–1.

Despite being eliminated from the Copa Libertadores, Vélez had managed to maintain themselves as serious contesters of the 2011 Clausura. On the penultimate fixture, Vélez defeated Huracán 2–0 and, after Lanús' defeat to Argentinos Juniors 4 hours later, won the national championship. During the whole season the team kept a regular starting lineup with Marcelo Barovero; Fabián Cubero, Sebastián Domínguez, Fernando Ortiz, Emiliano Papa; Augusto Fernández, Leandro Somoza / Franco Razzotti, Víctor Zapata; Maximiliano Moralez; Juan Manuel Martínez and Santiago Silva. Ricky Álvarez, Guillermo Franco, David Ramírez, Iván Bella, Jonathan Cristaldo, Fernando Tobio, Héctor Canteros and Agustín Vuletich also played regularly. Goalkeeper Barovero retained his Ubaldo Fillol Award during the tournament

Despite losing three of its key offensive players for the second half of the year (Maximiliano Moralez, Ricky Álvarez and Santiago Silva, who were purchased by Atalanta, Inter Milan and Fiorentina respectively), the team finished up 2011 with another semi-finalist finish in an international competition, this time losing to LDU Quito in the Copa Sudamericana, as well as a joint runner-up position in the 2011 Apertura (behind undefeated Boca Juniors).

With Gareca's contract renewal, Vélez prepared 2012 to once again challenge the Copa Libertadores. The club retained its key players and brought three footballers for its attack: Federico Insúa, Lucas Pratto and Iván Obolo. However, Vélez faced defending champions Santos in the quarter-finals and were eliminated in the penalty shootout. Nonetheless, a third-place finish in the 2012 Clausura secured them a spot in the next season's Copa Libertadores.

The 2012–13 Argentine Primera División season appeared to be a transition championship for the team, after losing many of its key players in the last transfer window (Juan Manuel Martínez, Augusto Fernández, Marcelo Barovero and Víctor Zapata), replacing them mainly with players from its youth divisions. Uruguayan goalkeeper Sebastián Sosa and youngsters Facundo Ferreyra and Jonathan Copete were the only signings. Despite these changes, Vélez went on to win the 2012 Inicial and Ferreyra was joint top-scorer of the league. The championship-winning regular starters were Sebastián Sosa (although Germán Montoya was the starter during the first half of the tournament); Fabián Cubero, Fernando Tobio, Sebastián Domínguez, Emiliano Papa; Iván Bella, Francisco Cerro, Ariel Cabral; Federico Insúa; Lucas Pratto and Facundo Ferreyra. Other important first team players were Gino Peruzzi, Juan Ignacio Sills, Lucas Romero, Jonathan Copete, Agustín Allione, Brian Ferreira and Ezequiel Rescaldani.

With the Copa Libertadores as the main objective, Vélez signed Argentine international Fernando Gago on loan for the start of 2013. However, and despite finishing first in the group, the team was eliminated by Newell's Old Boys in the round of 16, on away goals rule. Vélez could take revenge however by defeating Newell's (2013 Final champions) by 1–0 in the 2012–13 Superfinal, earning the 10th league championship for the club. The starting eleven for the Superfinal were Sosa; Cubero, Tobio, Domínguez, Papa; Bella, Franco Razzotti, Gago; Insúa; Pratto (who scored the winning goal) and Ferreyra. Peruzzi, Cerro and Romero entered in the second half.

After the end of the season, Ricardo Gareca left the managerial position after four years, in which he won four titles. His replacement was his assistant José Oscar Flores, former club forward and part of the 1990s multi-champions. Flores started his spell as Vélez manager winning the 2013 Supercopa Argentina against Arsenal de Sarandí (champions of the 2012–13 Copa Argentina). In June 2015, the club announced a financial loss of ARS 198,3 million.

== Uniform evolution ==
Uniforms worn by Vélez Sársfield since 1910:

1910–12	1912–14 (Note: First uniform of the club chosen in assembly.)	1914–33	1933 (Note: A merchant offered the club a pack of jerseys that had been previously commissioned by a rugby team (but never retired) at a low price. The offer was accepted by Vélez Sársfield and the white jersey with a blue "V" on the chest would be adopted as their definitive uniform.)

== Rivalries ==
Vélez Sarsfield direct rival is Ferro Carril Oeste, based in the neighbourhood of Caballito. The matches played between them are known as the Clásico del Oeste (in English: "Western Derby"). They have not faced each other since 2000 (because to relegation of Ferro Carril Oeste, that has not yet returned to first division), when Vélez Sarsfield beat Ferro Carril Oeste away 1–0.

== Stadium ==
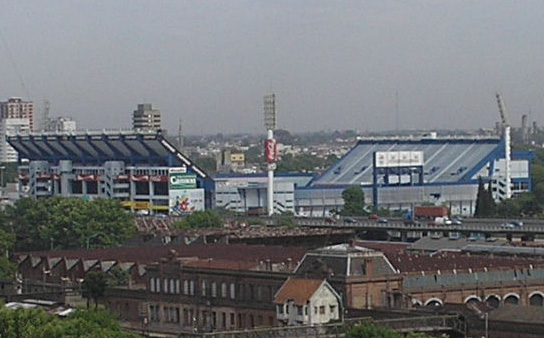
José Amalfitani Stadium

The José Amalfitani Stadium (named after José Amalfitani, club's president for 30 years) holds 49,540 people, although it does not provide seating for all of them. It is also frequently used for concerts and Argentina national rugby union team test matches. The stadium, nicknamed el Fortín (in English: "the Small Fort"), was built between 1941 and 1943, later rebuild in cement between 1947 and 1951, and again remodeled in preparation for the 1978 FIFA World Cup.

The stadium is located on 9200 Juan B. Justo avenue, in the Liniers neighborhood of Buenos Aires, a short walk from the Liniers railway station.

== Chairmen ==
- 1910–13: Luis Barredo
- 1913–14: Plácido Marín
- 1914: Roberto Piano
- 1914–17: Eduardo Ferro
- 1917–19: Antonio Marín Moreno
- 1919: Eduardo Ferro
- 1920–21: Antonio Marín Moreno
- 1921–23: Esteban Aversano
- 1923–25: José Amalfitani
- 1925–32: Enrique D'Elía
- 1932–35: Nicolás Marín Moreno
- 1936–37: Juan C. Sustaita
- 1937: Narciso Barrio
- 1937–38: Inocencio Bienati
- 1938–39: Nicolás Marín Moreno
- 1940–41: Roberto Orstein
- 1941–69: José Amalfitani
- 1969: Leonardo Pareja
- 1969–70: Domingo Trimarco
- 1970–76: José Ramón Feijóo
- 1976: Domingo Trimarco
- 1976–79: Osvaldo Guerrero
- 1979–85: Ricardo Petracca
- 1985–91: Francisco Antonio Pérez
- 1991–93: Ricardo Petracca
- 1993–96: Héctor Gaudio
- 1996–99: Raúl Gámez
- 1999–02: Carlos Eduardo Mousseaud
- 2002–05: Raúl Gámez
- 2005–08: Álvaro Balestrini
- 2008–11: Fernando Raffaini
- 2011–14: Miguel Calello
- 2014–17: Raúl Gámez
- 2017–23: Sergio Rapisarda
- 2023–present: Fabian Berlanga

== Players ==
=== Current squad ===
As of 22 November 2026

Note: Flags indicate national team as defined under FIFA eligibility rules; some limited exceptions apply. Players may hold more than one non-FIFA nationality.

No.	Pos.	Nation	Player
1	GK	ARG	Tomás Marchiori
2	DF	ARG	Emanuel Mammana
3	DF	ARG	Elías Gómez (captain)
4	DF	ARG	Joaquín García
5	MF	CHI	Claudio Baeza
8	MF	ARG	Lucas Robertone (on loan from Almería)
10	MF	CHI	Diego Valdés
11	FW	ARG	Matías Pellegrini
15	FW	ARG	Dilan Godoy
16	DF	ARG	Lisandro Magallán
17	FW	ARG	Álex Verón
18	DF	ARG	Simón Escobar
19	DF	PAR	Leo Cristaldo

No.	Pos.	Nation	Player
21	DF	ARG	Jano Gordon
22	MF	ARG	Manuel Lanzini
25	GK	ARG	Facundo Sanguinetti (on loan from Banfield)
28	FW	ARG	Simón Prima
29	MF	ARG	Rodrigo Aliendro
32	DF	ARG	Thiago Silvero
33	GK	ARG	Franco Villalba
34	GK	ARG	Álvaro Busso
35	MF	ARG	Matías Arias
37	FW	ARG	Juan Cruz Policella
39	FW	ARG	Thiago Aguirre
48	MF	ARG	Luca Feler
77	FW	PAR	Ronaldo Martínez (on loan from Talleres)

=== Reserve squad ===
Note: Flags indicate national team as defined under FIFA eligibility rules; some limited exceptions apply. Players may hold more than one non-FIFA nationality.

No.	Pos.	Nation	Player
42	GK	ARG	Agustín Cortez
46	MF	ARG	Ulises Piedrabuena

No.	Pos.	Nation	Player
47	DF	ARG	Alexis Pereyra
—	DF	ARG	Joaquín Vaquero

=== Out on loan ===
Note: Flags indicate national team as defined under FIFA eligibility rules; some limited exceptions apply. Players may hold more than one non-FIFA nationality.

No.	Pos.	Nation	Player
6	DF	ARG	Aarón Quirós (at Atlante until 30 June 2027)
7	FW	URU	Michael Santos (at Central Córdoba until 31 December 2026)
9	FW	ARG	Francisco Pozzo (at Unión La Calera until 31 December 2026)
10	MF	ARG	Elías Cabrera (at Atlético Nacional until 31 December 2026)
14	DF	ARG	Agustín Lagos (at Platense until 31 December 2026)
18	FW	ARG	Manuel Fernández (at Tigre until 31 December 2026)
19	MF	ARG	Leonel Roldán (at Juventud until 31 December 2026)

No.	Pos.	Nation	Player
23	DF	ARG	Patricio Pernicone (at Juventud until 31 December 2026)
25	FW	ARG	Jonathan Berón (at Tristán Suárez until 31 December 2026)
33	MF	ARG	Kevin Vázquez (at Independiente Rivadavia until 31 December 2026)
37	DF	ARG	Tomás Cavanagh (at Danubio until 31 December 2026)
47	FW	ARG	Benjamín Bosch (at Orenburg until 30 June 2027)
49	DF	ARG	Demián Domínguez (at Defensa y Justicia until 31 December 2027)
80	MF	ARG	Maximiliano Porcel (at Defensa y Justicia until 31 December 2027)

=== Records ===
==== Most appearances ====
Total games with the team, counting both league and international competitions.

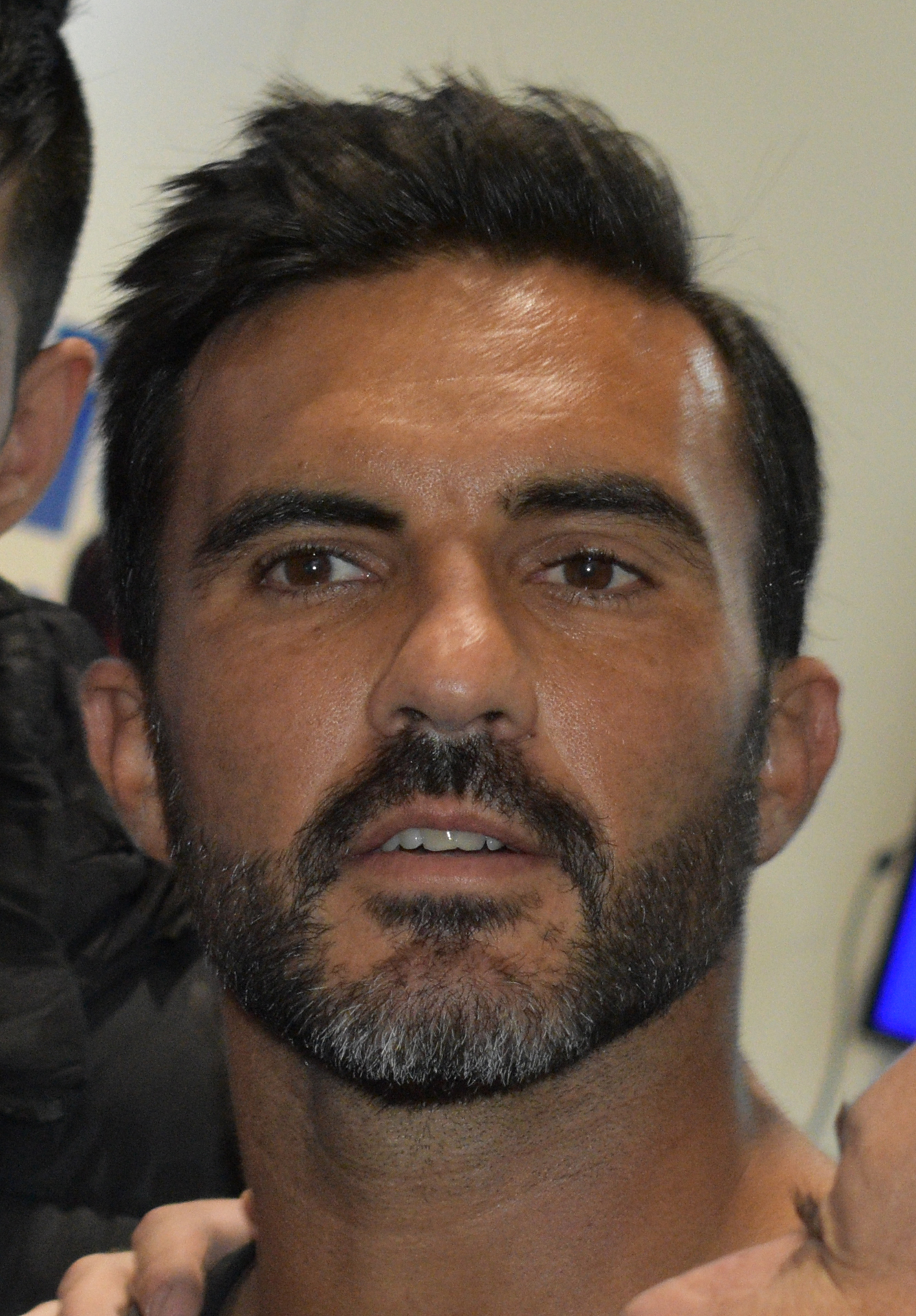
Fabián Cubero is the player with most appearances for the club, with 633

Rank	Player	Apps	Career
1	(Argentina) **Fabián Cubero**	633	1996–07, 2008–19
2	(Argentina) Pedro Larraquy	457	1975–87
3	(Argentina) Raúl Cardozo	411	1986–99
4	(Argentina) Ángel Allegri	399	1946–60
5	(Argentina) Armando Ovide	391	1941–55
6	(Paraguay) José Luis Chilavert	347	1991–00, 2004
7	(Argentina) Christian Bassedas	331	1990–00
8	(Argentina) Carlos Bianchi	324	1967–73, 1980–84
9	(Argentina) Luis Gregorio Gallo	319	1965–74
10	(Argentina) Juan C. Bujedo	296	1979–87

==== All-time topscorers ====
Total goals scored for the team, counting both league and international competitions.

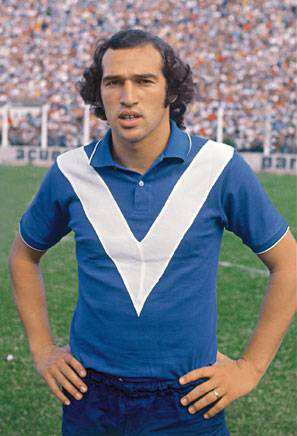
Carlos Bianchi, all-time topscorer, also a successful manager

Rank	Player	Goals	Career
1	(Argentina) **Carlos Bianchi**	206	1967–73, 1980–84
2	(Argentina) Juan José Ferraro	111	1943–49, 1953–57
3	(Argentina) Norberto Conde	108	1952–59, 1964–66
4	(Argentina) Agustín Cosso	95	1933–36, 1941
5	(Argentina) Pedro Larraquy	82	1975–87
6	(Argentina) Juan Carlos Carone	76	1964–69
7	(Argentina) Miguel Ángel Benito	74	1970–74
8	(Argentina) Omar Asad	70	1991–94, 1995–00, 2001–02
9	(Argentina) Daniel Willington	65	1962–70, 1978
10	(Argentina) Omar Roldán	60	1976–80

=== Current coaching staff ===
Position	Staff
Head coach	(Argentina) Guillermo Barros Schelotto
Assistant coach	(Argentina) Gustavo Barros Schelotto
Assistant coach	(Argentina) Federico Insúa
Fitness coach	(Argentina) Pablo Matamalas
Fitness coach	(Argentina) Marcelo Montero
Goalkeeping coach	(Argentina) Juan José Romero
Video analyst	(Argentina) Juan Manuel Rodríguez
Sporting director	(Argentina) Ricardo Álvarez
Director of football	(Argentina) Sebastián Pait
Operational coordinator	(Argentina) Diego Damiano

Last updated: 26 April 2025
Source: Cuerpo Técnico

=== Top goalscorers ===
==== National championships ====
The following players have been Argentine Primera División top scorers playing for the club.

Player	Championship	Goals
Salvador Carreras	1920 AAF	20
Agustín Cosso	1935	33
Norberto Conde	1954	19
Juan Carlos Carone	1965	19
Omar Wehbe	1968 Nacional	16
Carlos Bianchi	1970 Nacional	18
Carlos Bianchi	1971 Metropolitano	36
Carlos Bianchi	1981 Nacional	15
Jorge Comas	1985 Nacional	12
Esteban González	1990–91	18
José Oscar Flores	1995 Clausura	14
Rolando Zárate	2004 Clausura	13
Mauro Zárate	2006 Clausura	12
Santiago Silva	2010 Apertura	11
Facundo Ferreyra	2012 Inicial	13
Mauro Zárate	2014 Final	13
Lucas Pratto	2014	11

==== International competitions ====
The following players have been top scorers in an official international competition playing for the club.

Player	Competition	Goals
Patricio Camps	1996 Supercopa Sudamericana	4
Sebastián Ereros	2006 Copa Libertadores	5

=== Individual awards ===
The following players have won an official individual award while playing for Vélez.

Player	Award	Year won
José Luis Cuciuffo	South American Team of the Year	1986
Oscar Ruggeri	South American Footballer of the Year	1991
Oscar Ruggeri	Footballer of the Year of Argentina	1991
Oscar Ruggeri	South American Team of the Year	1991
José Luis Chilavert	South American Team of the Year	1994
José Luis Chilavert	IFFHS World's Best Goalkeeper	1995
José Luis Chilavert	South American Team of the Year	1995
Roberto Trotta	South American Team of the Year	1995
José Luis Chilavert	South American Footballer of the Year	1996
José Luis Chilavert	Footballer of the Year of Argentina	1996
José Luis Chilavert	South American Team of the Year	1996
José Luis Chilavert	IFFHS World's Best Goalkeeper	1997
José Luis Chilavert	South American Team of the Year	1997
José Luis Chilavert	IFFHS World's Best Goalkeeper	1998
José Luis Chilavert	South American Team of the Year	1998
José Luis Chilavert	South American Team of the Year	1999
Germán Montoya	Ubaldo Fillol Award	2009
Nicolás Otamendi	South American Team of the Year	2009
Juan Manuel Martínez	Footballer of the Year of Argentina	2010
Marcelo Barovero	Ubaldo Fillol Award	2010
Santiago Silva	South American Team of the Year	2010
Marcelo Barovero	Ubaldo Fillol Award	2011

=== World Cup players ===
The following players represented their national team in a FIFA World Cup while playing for the club. The player in bold was part of a squad that also won that edition of the World Cup.

Nº	Player	National team	World Cup edition
1	Ludovico Avio	Argentina	1958
2	Nery Pumpido	Argentina	1982
3	**José Luis Cuciuffo**	Argentina	1986
4	José Basualdo	Argentina	1994
5	Pablo Cavallero	Argentina	1998
6	José Luis Chilavert	Paraguay	1998
7	Nicolás Otamendi	Argentina	2010

The following players were formed in the club's youth divisions and participated in a FIFA World Cup, regardless if they did so while playing for the club.

Nº	Player	National team	World Cup edition(s)
1	Ludovico Avio	Argentina	1958
2	Carmelo Simeone	Argentina	1966
3	Diego Simeone	Argentina	1994, 1998 and 2002
4	Pablo Cavallero	Argentina	1998 and 2002
5	Claudio Husaín	Argentina	2002
6	**Nicolás Otamendi**	Argentina	2010, 2018 and 2022
7	Jonás Gutiérrez	Argentina	2010
8	Ricky Álvarez	Argentina	2014
9	**Thiago Almada**	Argentina	2022

== Managers ==
- (Argentina) Victorio Spinetto (1942–43, 1944–55, 1958, 1961)
- (Argentina) Juan José Ferraro (1964)
- (Argentina) Victorio Spinetto (1966–67)
- (Argentina) Carlos Cavagnaro (1967–68)
- (Argentina) Manuel Giúdice (1968)
- (Argentina) Juan Urriolabeitía (1976)
- (Argentina) Jorge Solari (1980)
- (Argentina) Juan Carlos Lorenzo (1982–83)
- (Argentina) José Yudica (1986–87)
- (Argentina) Daniel Willington (1987–88)
- (Argentina) Héctor Veira (1989)
- (Argentina) Alfio Basile (1 July 1989 – 30 June 1990)
- (Argentina) Eduardo Luján Manera (1992)
- (Argentina) Carlos Bianchi (1 July 1993 – 31 Dec 1995)
- (Argentina) Osvaldo Piazza (1996–97)
- (Argentina) Marcelo Bielsa (1 July 1997 – 30 June 1998)
- (Argentina) Julio César Falcioni (1 July 1997 – 30 June 2000)
- (Uruguay) Óscar Tabárez (1 July 2000 – 30 June 2001)
- (Argentina) Edgardo Bauza (1 July 2001 – 30 June 2002)
- (Argentina) Carlos Ischia (1 Jan 2002 – 30 June 2004)
- (Argentina) Alberto Fanesi (1 Jan 2004 – 30 June 2004)
- (Argentina) Mario Zanabria (17 May 2004 – 23 June 2004)
- (Argentina) Miguel Ángel Russo (1 July 2004–??)
- (Argentina) Ricardo La Volpe (1 Jan 2007 – 15 Nov 2007)
- (Argentina) Pedro Larraquy (interim) (2007)
- (Argentina) Hugo Tocalli (1 Dec 2007 – 31 Dec 2008)
- (Argentina) Ricardo Gareca (16 Dec 2008 – 31 Dec 2013)
- (Argentina) José Oscar Flores (1 Jan 2014–14)
- (Argentina) Miguel Ángel Russo (1 Jan 2015 – 29 Oct 2015)
- (Argentina) Christian Bassedas (13 Nov 2015 – Sept 25, 2016)
- (Argentina) Omar De Felippe (Sept 30, 2016 – 7 Nov 2017)
- (Argentina) Gabriel Heinze (12 Dec 2017 – 12 Nov 2019)
- (Argentina) Mauricio Pellegrino (17 Apr 2020 – 23 Mar 2022)
- (Argentina) Julio Vaccari (interim) (24 Mar 2022 – 24 May 2022)
- (Uruguay) Alexander Medina (30 May 2022 – 25 Feb 2023)
- (Argentina) Ricardo Gareca (8 Mar 2023 – 4 Jun 2023)
- (Argentina) Sebastián Méndez (27 Jun 2023 – 8 Dec 2023)
- (Bolivia) Gustavo Quinteros (23 Dec 2023 – Dec 2024)
- (Argentina) Sebastián Domínguez (27 Dec 2024 – 2 Mar 2025)

== Honours ==
=== Senior titles ===
Keys

- Record
- ^{(s)} Shared record

Type	Competition	Titles	Winning years
National (League)	Primera División	11	1968 Nacional, 1993 Clausura, 1995 Apertura, 1996 Clausura, 1998 Clausura, 2005 Clausura, 2009 Clausura, 2011 Clausura, 2012 Inicial, 2012–13 Superfinal, 2024
National (Cups)	Supercopa Argentina	2	2013, 2024
National (Cups)	Supercopa Internacional	1^{(s)}	2024
International	Copa Libertadores	1	1994
International	Copa Interamericana	1	1994
International	Supercopa Sudamericana	1	1996
International	Recopa Sudamericana	1	1997
Worldwide	Intercontinental Cup	1	1994

=== Other titles ===
Titles won in lower divisions:

- Primera B: 1943
- Primera C (2): 1914 FAF, 1922 AAm

== Other sports ==
=== Basketball ===
Vélez Sarsfield has both men's and women's basketball teams. The men's team currently plays at the Liga Nacional B (3rd level). On the other hand, the women's team is the most successful in Argentina, having won the Liga Nacional de Básquet Femenino (Argentine first division) 6 times, including the 2010 season. Vélez's starting five during the 2010 championship (Sandra Pavón, Marina Cava, Paula Gatti, Paula Reggiardo, and Florencia Fernández) were selected to represent Argentina at the 2010 FIBA World Championship for Women.

=== Volleyball ===
The club also has men's and women's volleyball teams in Buenos Aires' metropolitan leagues.

== See also ==
- Works team
- List of world champion football clubs
