= Sebastián Sosa =

Uruguayan footballer (born 1986)

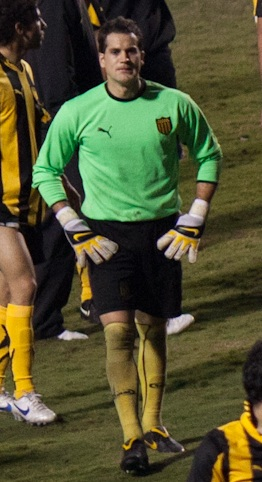

Personal information
- Full name: Carlos Sebastián Sosa Silva
- Date of birth: 19 August 1986 (age 40)
- Place of birth: Montevideo, Uruguay
- Height: 1.84 m (6 ft 0 in)
- Position: Goalkeeper

Team information
- Current team: CA Juventud
- Number: 1

Youth career
- 1998–2000: Central Español
- 2001–2007: Peñarol

Senior career*
Years	Team	Apps	(Gls)
2007–2011	Peñarol	58	(0)
2008	→ Central Español (loan)	28	(0)
2011–2012	Boca Juniors	3	(0)
2012–2015	Vélez Sársfield	86	(0)
2015–2017	Pachuca	0	(0)
2016	→ Zacatecas (loan)	0	(0)
2016	→ Rosario Central (loan)	15	(0)
2017	→ Morelia (loan)	4	(0)
2017–2020	Morelia	96	(0)
2020–2021	Mazatlán	4	(0)
2020–2021	→ Independiente (loan)	45	(0)
2022	Independiente	20	(0)
2023	UNAM	12	(0)
2023–2024	Atlético Morelia	8	(0)
2024	Vélez Sarsfield	0	(0)
2024	Deportivo Maipú	17	(0)
2025–	CA Juventud	28	(0)

International career
2003	Uruguay U17		
2005	Uruguay U20		
2022	Uruguay	1	(0)
- * Club domestic league appearances and goals as of 1 October 2025

Carlos Sebastián Sosa Silva (born 19 August 1986) is a Uruguayan professional footballer who plays as a goalkeeper for CA Juventud.

== Club career ==
Sosa made his debut for Peñarol in 2007. In 2008, he was loaned to Central Español, where he played 28 games in two years, before returning to Peñarol.

Upon his return, Sosa was the second choice goalkeeper behind former Argentine international Pablo Cavallero, until coach Julio Ribas chose him for the starting eleven of Peñarol for the 2009–10 Uruguayan Primera División season. During that season, Sosa helped Peñarol to win the league title. Afterwards, Sosa was a regular in the Peñarol team that also reached the final of the 2011 Copa Libertadores (where his team was defeated by Santos.

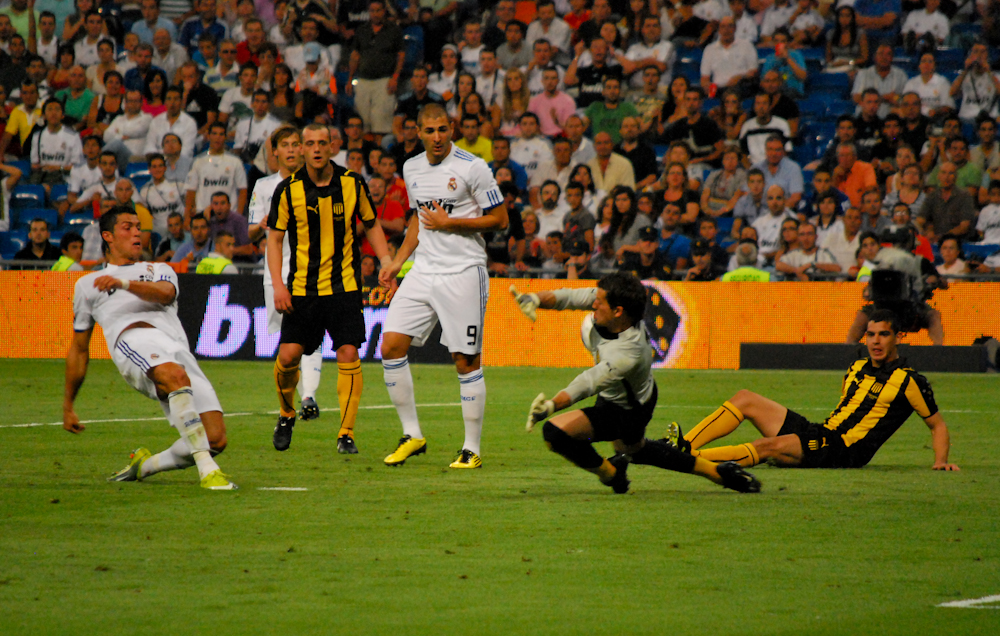
Sosa saves a shot from Cristiano Ronaldo in a friendly between Peñarol and Real Madrid

In July 2011, the Uruguayan goalkeeper signed for Argentine giants Boca Juniors. During his one-year stay at Boca, Sosa was mostly a substitute for Agustín Orión, but won with the team the 2011 Apertura and the 2011–12 Copa Argentina.

Subsequently, Sosa joined Vélez Sársfield also of Argentina. There he again the second choice goalkeeper (behind Germán Montoya) at first, but then became a regular starter and played 9 games in his team's 2012 Inicial winning campaign. Sosa was also a starter in Vélez victories in the 2012–13 Superfinal and the 2013.

In June 2015, after his contract with Vélez ended, he joined Pachuca.

In January 2017, Sosa joined Monarcas Morelia on loan from Pachuca. He was the second choice goalkeeper behind Carlos Felipe Rodriguez, for the majority of the season as Morelia battled relegation. After making a great impression that culminated with a Copa MX runner up finish, Sosa was promoted to first choice goalkeeper for the last 2 games of the season as Morelia inched away from relegation.

== International career ==
Sosa has played for Uruguay's under-17 and under-20 teams at youth level. At the age of 35, he made his senior team debut on 11 June 2022 in a 5–0 friendly win against Panama.

== Career statistics ==
=== International ===
As of match played 11 June 2022

Appearances and goals by national team and year
National team	Year	Apps	Goals
Uruguay	2022	1	0
Total		1	0

== Honours ==
Peñarol

- Uruguayan Primera División (1): 2009–10

Boca Juniors

- Argentine Primera División (1): 2011 Apertura
- Copa Argentina (1): 2011–12

Vélez Sársfield

- Argentine Primera División (2): 2012 Inicial, 2012–13 Superfinal
- Supercopa Argentina (1): 2013

Individual

- Liga MX Player of the Month: September 2019
