= Darío Ocampo =

Argentine footballer

Personal information
- Full name: Ramón Darío Ocampo
- Date of birth: 21 June 1986 (age 40)
- Place of birth: Jardín América, Argentina
- Height: 1.60 m (5 ft 3 in)
- Position: Attacking midfielder

Youth career
- Vélez Sársfield

Senior career*
Years	Team	Apps	(Gls)
2004–2011	Vélez Sársfield	77	(6)
2009–2010	→ Rosario Central (loan)	4	(0)
2010–2011	→ Argentinos Juniors (loan)	6	(0)
2011–2017	Guaraní	176	(16)
2018–2019	General Díaz	28	(3)
- * Club domestic league appearances and goals

Ramón Darío Ocampo (born 21 June 1986) is an Argentine former football midfielder.

== Career ==
Ocampo made his debut for Vélez Sársfield on November 19, 2004. In 2009, he was part of the squad that won the Clausura championship, his second championship with the club.

In 2010, Ocampo joined defending Argentine Primera División champion Argentinos Juniors, on a free loan with option to buy from Vélez Sársfield.

== Honours ==
Vélez Sársfield

- Primera División Argentina (2): Clausura 2005, Clausura 2009

== See also ==
- List of expatriate footballers in Paraguay
- Players and Records in Paraguayan Football
