= José Amalfitani =

Argentine construction manager, sports journalist and association football executive

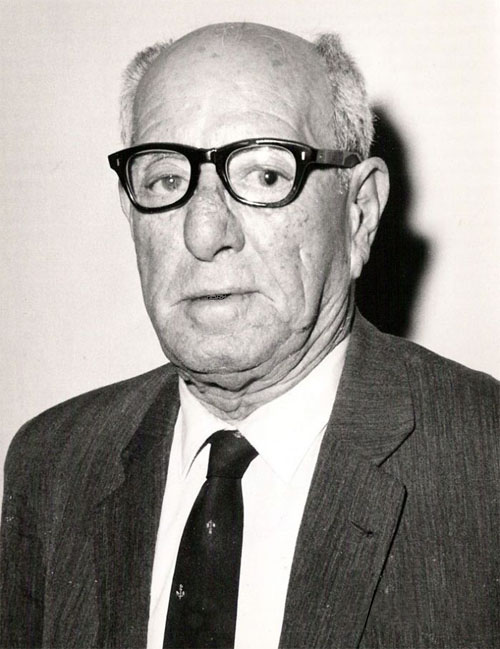
Portrait of Amalfitani, unknown date

José Amalfitani (June 16, 1894 – May 14, 1969), nicknamed Don Pepe (in English "Mr. Pepe"), was an Argentine construction manager, sports journalist and association football executive who was chairman of the club Vélez Sársfield for 30 years (in the periods of 1923-1925 and 1941–1969). Amalfitani is one of the most important figures in Vélez' history, and the club's stadium is named after him. Moreover, the Argentine Football Association recognized him posthumously by declaring May 14 (the day of Amalfitani's death) as the day of the sports executive.

== See also ==
- Club Atlético Vélez Sársfield

== Notes ==
1."Pepe" is a common Spanish hypocorism for the name "José".
