= Pedro Larraquy =

Argentine footballer

Personal information
- Full name: Pedro Omar Larraquy
- Date of birth: 13 June 1956 (age 70)
- Place of birth: Buenos Aires, Argentina
- Positions: Defender; midfielder

Senior career*
Years	Team	Apps	(Gls)
1975–1987	Vélez Sársfield	455	(82)
1987–1988	San Lorenzo	19	(1)

International career
1979	Argentina	4	(0)

Managerial career
- 2007: Vélez Sársfield (interim)
- 2008: Vélez Sársfield (interim)
- * Club domestic league appearances and goals as of 6 December 2008

Pedro Omar Larraquy (born 13 June 1956 in Buenos Aires) is an Argentine former footballer who played as a defender or midfielder. He spent the majority of his playing career at Vélez Sársfield, where he set a record number of appearances with 455. In December 2008, he became interim manager of Vélez Sársfield to replace Hugo Tocalli.

Larraquy started his professional career in 1975, with Velez Sarsfield. He played as a defender at first but in later years he was converted into a midfield player.

In 1979, the club reached the final of the Metropolitano championship only to lose to River Plate. On the strength of his performances Larraquy was selected to represent the Argentina national football team at the 1979 Copa América.

In 1980, Larraquy suffered a serious injury that prevented him from playing in the Copa Libertadores. In 1981, he enjoyed one of the highlights of his career, scoring 4 goals in a 5–0 win over Gimnasia y Tiro de Salta.

In 1985, Vélez Sarsfield reached the final of the Nacional championship only to lose this time to Argentinos Juniors.

Larraquy left Velez in 1987, having played 455 games for the club, and scored 82 goals. His goals tally leaves him in 5th place in the club's all-time scorers list. Between 1987 and 1988 Larraquy played for San Lorenzo de Almagro, he retired in 1988.

Larraquy went on to earn his coaching licence and currently works as the youth team co-ordinator at Velez.
