= Emiliano Papa =

Argentine footballer

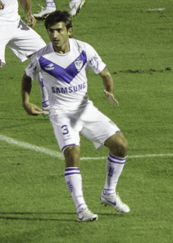

Personal information
- Full name: Emiliano Ramiro Papa
- Date of birth: April 19, 1982 (age 44)
- Place of birth: Acebal, Santa Fe, Argentina
- Height: 1.71 m (5 ft 7 in)
- Position: Left-back

Senior career*
Years	Team	Apps	(Gls)
2002–2006	Rosario Central	138	(5)
2006–2014	Vélez Sársfield	238	(6)
2007–2008	→ Rosario Central (loan)	32	(1)
2015–2016	Independiente	18	(0)
2016–2017	Tigre	17	(0)
2017–2021	Arsenal de Sarandí	97	(1)

International career
2008–2011	Argentina	8	(0)
- * Club domestic league appearances and goals

Emiliano Ramiro Papa (born 19 April 1982) is an Argentine former football player, who played as a left-back.

== Club career ==
Papa made his debut for Rosario Central in 2002, going on to play over 100 games for the club. In 2006, he moved to Vélez Sársfield. However, after a single season with Vélez he returned to Rosario Central on loan, re-establishing himself in the starting lineup and captaining the team on several occasions.

After the season-long loan in Rosario Central ended, Papa returned to Vélez Sársfield and became the team's starter at left-back, relegating Pablo Lima. With Vélez, he won the 2009 Clausura, starting in all the 19 games of the tournament. In May 2010 he extended his contract with Vélez until June 2013.

Papa was also a regular starter in Vélez's 2011 Clausura and 2012 Inicial league titles. He also started for Vélez in the 2012–13 Superfinal and 2013 Supercopa Argentina titles. In 2014, the defender played his 300th game for the club (counting both domestic and international competitions), becoming one of the 10 players with most appearances in Vélez' history.

In January 2015, Vélez and Papa terminated the defender's contract, by mutual agreement, and he signed a two-year contract with Independiente.

== International career ==
Papa was called up to the Argentina national team for a friendly match against Scotland on 19 November 2008, which was Diego Maradona's first game and victory as Argentina's manager (1–0). Papa was also a starter in Maradona's first defeat coaching Argentina, against Bolivia (1–6). He played 6 times during Maradona's era, but was left out of the final squad for the 2010 FIFA World Cup.

Under Alejandro Sabella's coaching, Papa was a starter with Argentina national team in both legs of the first annual Superclásico de las Américas, in Córdoba on 14 September 2011 and in Brazil on 28 September 2011.

=== International appearances ===
#	Date	Venue	Opponent	Final score	Result	Competition
7.	September 14, 2011	Córdoba, Argentina	Brazil	0–0	Draw	2011 Roca Cup.
8.	September 28, 2011	Belém, Brazil	Brazil	2–0	Lost	2011 Roca Cup.

== Honours ==
Vélez Sársfield

- Argentine Primera División (4): 2009 Clausura, 2011 Clausura, 2012 Inicial, 2012–13 Superfinal
- Supercopa Argentina (1): 2013 Supercopa Argentina
