= 1994 Copa Libertadores finals =

- Event: 1994 Copa Libertadores
Vélez Sarsfield	São Paulo
(Argentina)	(Brazil)
1	1
- (after both teams tied on points and goals, Vélez Sarsfield won the penalty shootout)

First leg
Vélez Sarsfield	São Paulo
1	0
- Date: 24 August 1994
- Venue: José Amalfitani Stadium, Buenos Aires
- Referee: José Torres Cadena (Colombia)
- Attendance: 42,000

Second leg
São Paulo	Vélez Sarsfield
1	0
- Date: 31 August 1994
- Venue: Estádio do Morumbi, São Paulo
- Referee: Ernesto Filippi (Uruguay)
- Attendance: 92,650

The 1994 Copa Libertadores final was a two-legged football match-up to determine the 1994 Copa Libertadores champion. The final was contested by Argentine club Vélez Sarsfield (that played its first final ever) and Brazilian São Paulo FC. The first leg, held in José Amalfitani Stadium, Vélez beat Sao Paulo 1–0 while in the second leg, held in Estádio do Morumbi, Sao Paulo was the winner by the same score.

As both teams equaled in points and goal difference, a penalty shoot-out was conducted to decide a champion. After striker Palhinha missed his shot, Vélez Sarsfield won on penalties their first Copa Libertadores trophy.

== Qualified teams ==
Team	Previous finals app.
(Argentina) Vélez Sarsfield	None
(Brazil) São Paulo	1974, **1992**, **1993**

Bold indicates winning years

== Venues ==
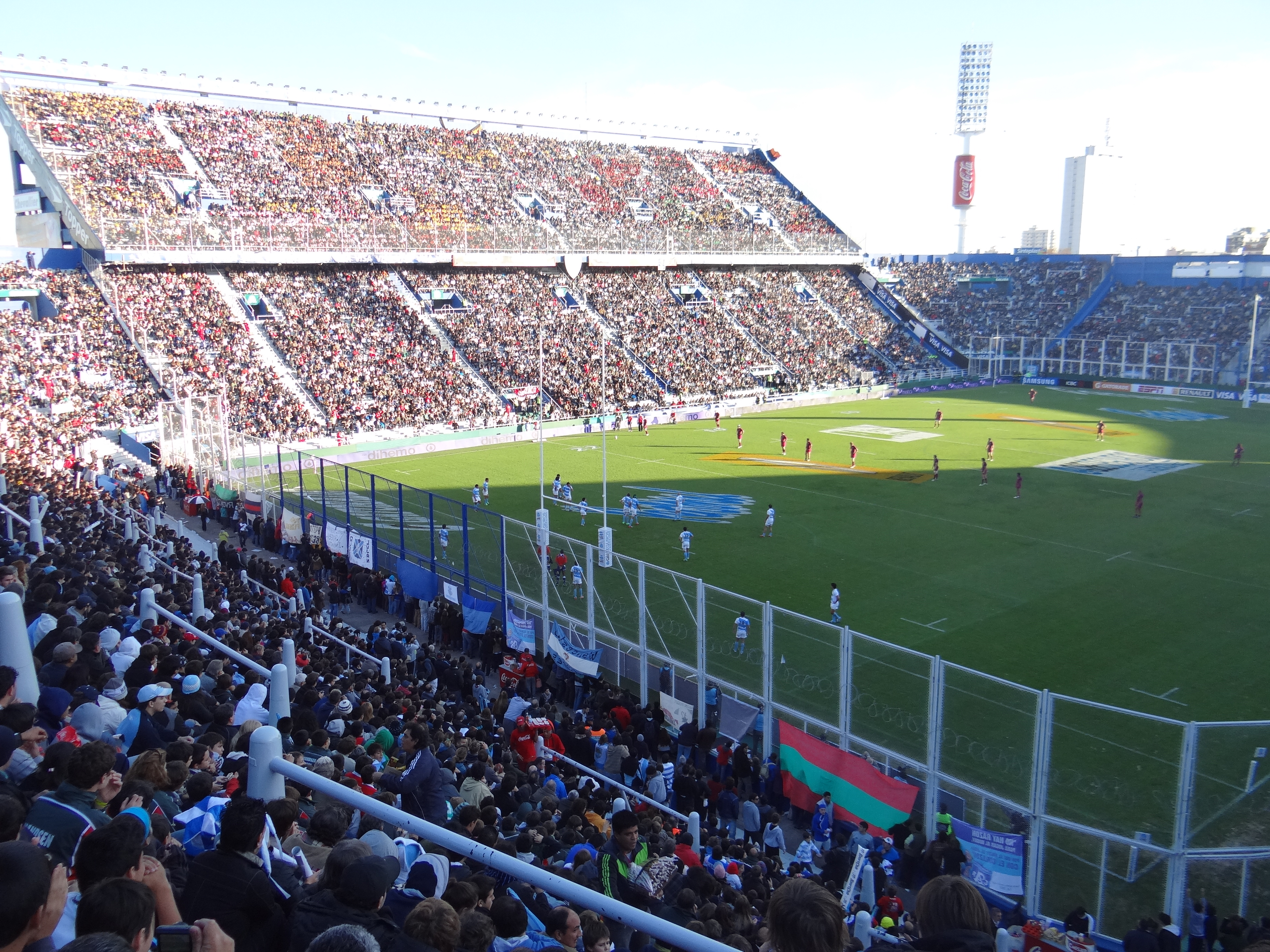
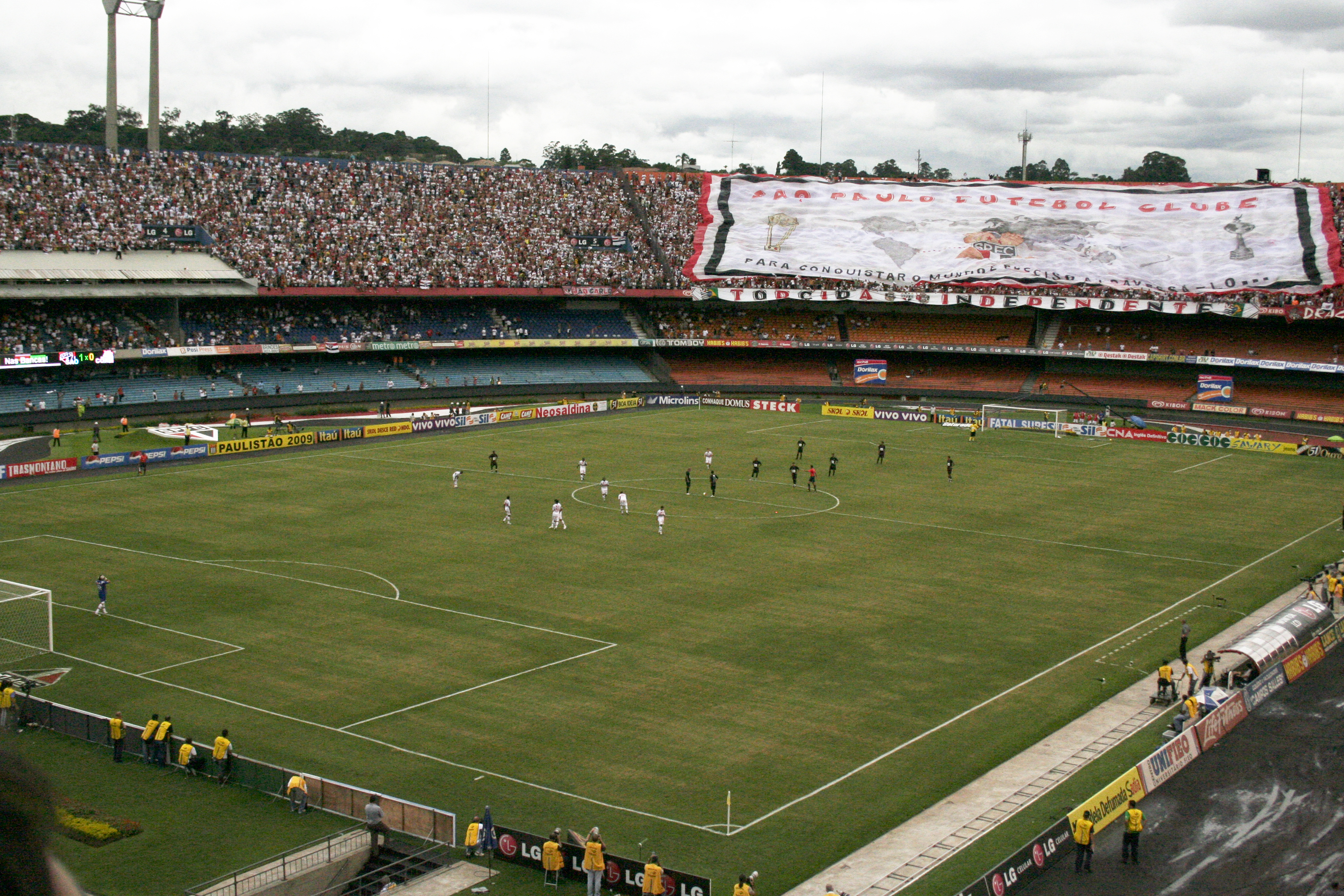
José Amalfitani stadium (left) and Estadio do Morumbi, venues for the series

== Match details ==
=== First leg ===
1994 Copa Libertadores
24 August 1994
First leg

Vélez Sarsfield (Argentina)	1–0	(Brazil) São Paulo
Asad 35'

José Amalfitani, Buenos Aires
Attendance: 42,000
Referee: José Torres Cadena (Colombia)

**Vélez Sarsfield**	**São Paulo**

GK	1	(Paraguay) José Luis Chilavert
DF	11	(Argentina) Flavio Zandoná
DF	2	(Argentina) Roberto Trotta (c)
DF	6	(Argentina) Víctor H. Sotomayor
DF	3	(Argentina) Raúl Cardozo
MF	7	(Argentina) Christian Bassedas
MF	5	(Argentina) Marcelo Gómez
MF	8	(Argentina) José Basualdo
MF	18	(Argentina) Roberto Pompei
FW	9	(Argentina) Omar Asad	(substituted off) 83'
FW	17	(Argentina) José Oscar Flores	(substituted off) 73'
Substitutes:
FW	19	(Argentina) Fabián Fernández	(substituted on) 73'
MF	21	(Argentina) Claudio Husain	(substituted on) 83'
Manager:
(Argentina) Carlos Bianchi

GK	1	(Brazil) Zetti (c)
RB	2	(Brazil) Vítor
CB	4	(Brazil) Júnior Baiano
CB	13	(Brazil) Gilmar
LB	6	(Brazil) André Luiz
DM	3	(Brazil) Válber
DM	14	(Brazil) Axel
CM	8	(Brazil) Cafu
CM	9	(Brazil) Palhinha	(substituted off) 56'
FW	7	(Brazil) Müller
FW	11	(Brazil) Euller
Substitutes:
GK	12	(Brazil) Rogério Ceni
MF	5	(Brazil) Doriva
MF	15	(Brazil) Juninho Paulista	(substituted on) 56'
DF	24	(Brazil) Marcelo Bordon
DF	25	(Brazil) Thiago Gama
Manager:
(Brazil) Telê Santana

Assistant referees:
? (Colombia)
? (Colombia)
Fourth official:
?

=== Second leg ===
31 August 1994
Second leg

São Paulo (Brazil)	1–0	(Argentina) Vélez Sarsfield
Müller 33' (pen.)
Penalties
Palhinha (penalty missed); André Luiz (penalty scored); Müller (penalty scored); Euller (penalty scored)	3–5	(penalty scored) Trotta; (penalty scored) Chilavert; (penalty scored) Zandoná; (penalty scored) Almandoz; (penalty scored) Pompei

Estádio do Morumbi, São Paulo
Attendance: 92,650
Referee: Ernesto Filippi (Uruguay)

**São Paulo**	**Vélez Sarsfield**

GK	1	(Brazil) Zetti (c)
RB	2	(Brazil) Vítor	(yellow card) 53'	(substituted off) 76'
CB	4	(Brazil) Júnior Baiano
CB	13	(Brazil) Gilmar
LB	6	(Brazil) André Luiz
DM	3	(Brazil) Válber
DM	14	(Brazil) Axel
CM	8	(Brazil) Cafu
CM	9	(Brazil) Palhinha
FW	7	(Brazil) Müller
FW	11	(Brazil) Euller
Substitutes:
GK	12	(Brazil) Rogério Ceni
MF	5	(Brazil) Doriva
MF	15	(Brazil) Juninho Paulista		(substituted on) 76'
FW	16	(Brazil) Caio Ribeiro
DF	17	(Brazil) Nem
Manager:
(Brazil) Telê Santana

GK	1	(Paraguay) José Luis Chilavert	(yellow card) 62'
DF	11	(Argentina) Flavio Zandoná
DF	2	(Argentina) Roberto Trotta (c)
DF	3	(Argentina) Raúl Cardozo	(red card) 64'
DF	4	(Argentina) Héctor Almandoz	(yellow card) 10'
DF	13	(Argentina) Mauricio Pellegrino	(yellow card) 29'
MF	7	(Argentina) Christian Bassedas	(yellow card) 71'
MF	5	(Argentina) Marcelo Gómez
MF	8	(Argentina) José Basualdo	(yellow card) 3'	(substituted off) 54'
FW	9	(Argentina) Omar Asad
FW	17	(Argentina) José Oscar Flores		(substituted off) 65'
Substitutes:
MF	18	(Argentina) Roberto Pompei	(yellow card) 86'	(substituted on) 54'
MF	21	(Argentina) Claudio Husain		(substituted on) 65'
Manager:
(Argentina) Carlos Bianchi (red card) 65'

Assistant referees:
Júlio Matto (Uruguay)
Carlos Velázquez (Uruguay)
Fourth official:
?
