= 1996 Copa Interamericana =

- Event: Copa Interamericana
Cartaginés	Vélez Sarsfield
(Costa Rica)	(Argentina)
0	2
- (on aggregate)

First leg
Cartaginés	Vélez Sarsfield
0	0
- Date: February 17, 1996
- Venue: Rafael Fello Meza, Cartago
- Referee: Benito Archundia (Mexico)

Second leg
Vélez Sarsfield	Cartaginés
2	0
- Date: February 24, 1996
- Venue: José Amalfitani Stadium, Buenos Aires
- Referee: Eduardo Diuzniewski (Uruguay)

The 1996 Copa Interamericana was the 16th. edition of the Copa Interamericana. The final took place between Argentine club Vélez Sarsfield and Costa Rican side Club Sport Cartaginés and was staged over two legs on February 17 and February 24, 1996.

Coached by Carlos Bianchi, Vélez Sarsfield team was formed by most of players that had won the 1994 Intercontinental Cup with the addition of Marcelo Herrera to replace José Basualdo (tradedd to Boca Juniors) and some players promoted from the youth divisions.

The first leg, held in Cartago, ended in a 0–0 tie while in the second leg in Buenos Aires, Vélez Sarsfield beat Cartaginés 2–0, therefore the Argentine club won their first Interamericana trophy, achieving their third international title within two years.

== Qualified teams ==
Team	Qualification	Previous app.
(Argentina) Vélez Sarsfield	1994 Copa Libertadores champion	None
(Costa Rica) Cartaginés	1994 CONCACAF Champions' Cup champion	None

== Venues ==
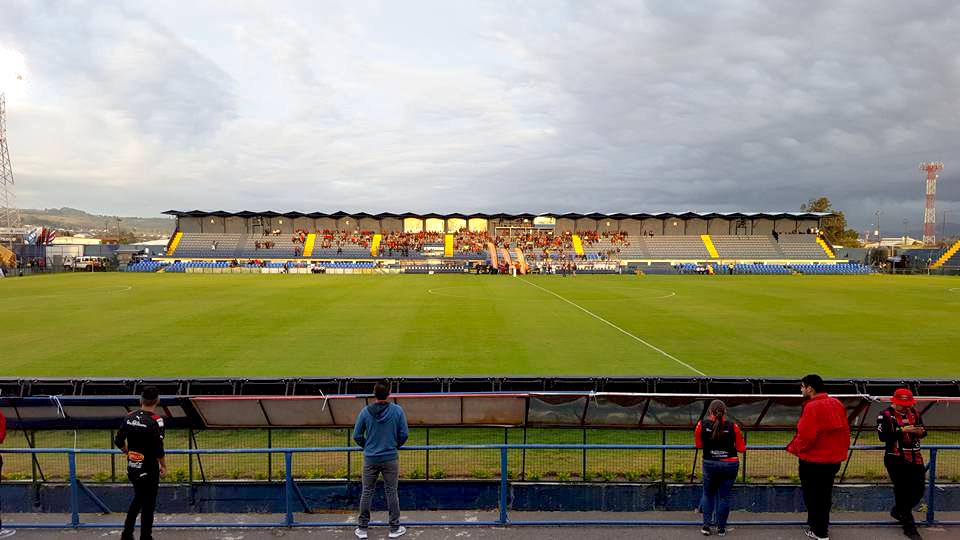
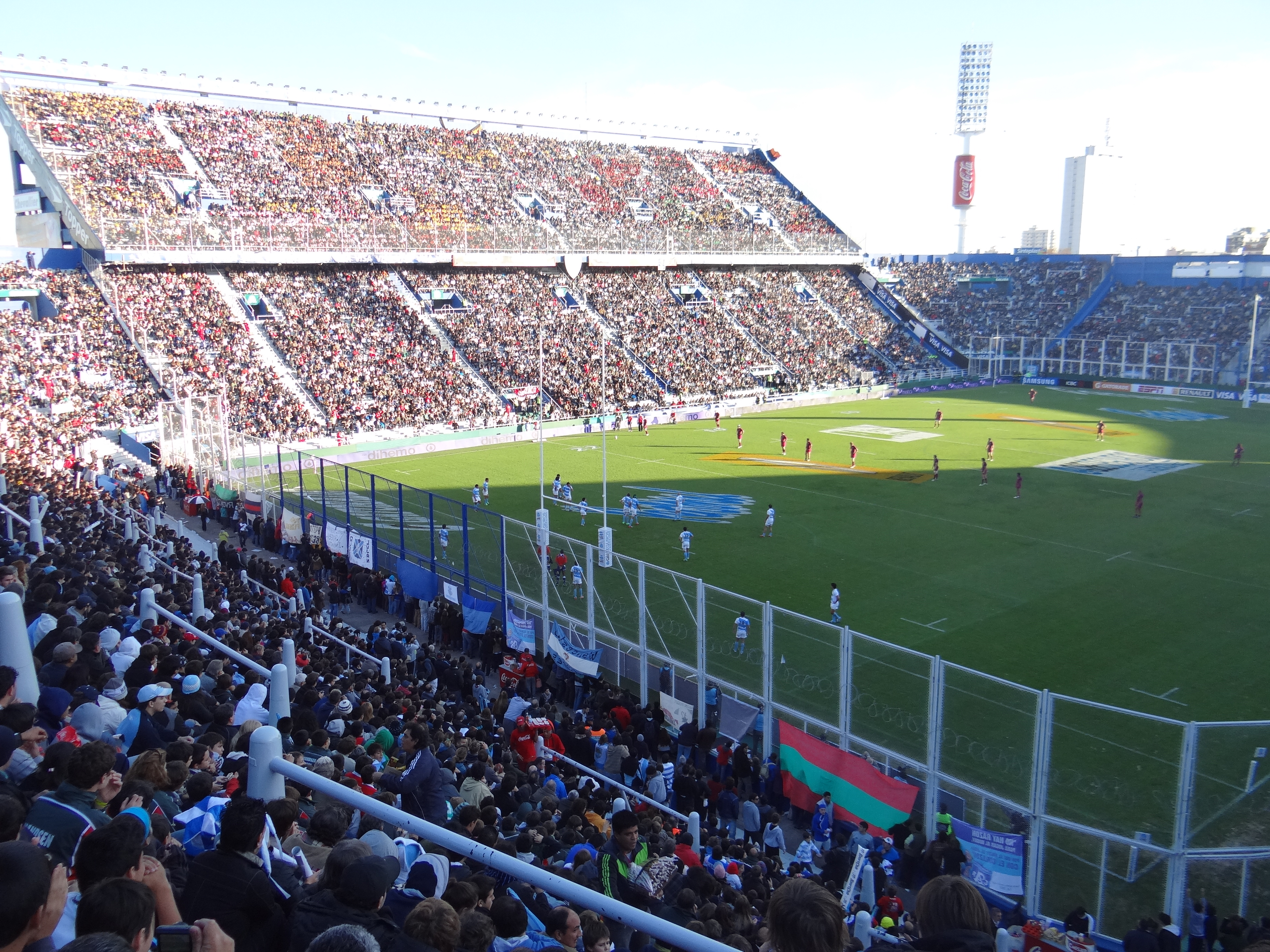
Rafael Fello Meza (left) and José Amalfitani, venues of the finals

== Match details ==
=== First leg ===
1996 Copa Interamericana
February 17, 1996
First leg

Cartaginés (Costa Rica)	0–0	(Argentina) Vélez Sarsfield
	Report

Rafael Fello Meza, Cartago
Referee: Benito Archundia (Mexico)

Cartaginés	Vélez

GK	1	(Costa Rica) Hermidio Barrantes
DF		(Costa Rica) Evaristo Contreras
DF		(Costa Rica) Maximilien Peinado
DF	14	(Costa Rica) Henry Wood
DF		(Costa Rica) Alexander Gómez
MF		(Brazil) Luiz Claudio Dos Santos
MF		(Costa Rica) Max Sánchez	(substituted off) 84'
MF		(Costa Rica) Norman Pin Gómez
MF		(Costa Rica) Marco Tulio Hidalgo	(substituted off) 65'
FW		(Costa Rica) Jewisson Benneth
FW		(Costa Rica) Heriberto Quirós (substituted off) 71'
Substitutes:
FW		(Costa Rica) Jewisson Benneth	(substituted on) 65'
		(Brazil) Everaldo da Costa	(substituted on) 71'
MF		(Brazil) Aurelio Ferreira	(substituted on) 84'
Manager:
(Costa Rica)

GK	1	(Paraguay) José Luis Chilavert
DF	4	(Argentina) Flavio Zandoná
DF	2	(Argentina) Roberto Trotta	Red card
DF	6	(Argentina) Mauricio Pellegrino
DF	3	(Argentina) Raúl Cardozo
MF	8	(Argentina) Marcelo Herrera
MF	5	(Argentina) Marcelo Gómez
MF	7	(Argentina) Guillermo Morigi
FW	10	(Argentina) Patricio Camps	(substituted off) 89'
FW	9	(Argentina) Fernando Pandolfi	(substituted off) 87'
FW	11	(Argentina) José Flores	(substituted off) 75'
Substitutes:
FW		(Argentina) Martín Posse	(substituted on) 75'
MF		(Argentina) Claudio Husaín	(substituted on) 87'
MF		(Argentina) Carlos Compagnucci	(substituted on) 89'
Manager:
(Argentina) Carlos Bianchi

=== Second leg ===
February 24, 1996
Second leg

Vélez Sarsfield (Argentina)	2–0	(Costa Rica) Cartaginés
Flores 3', 76'	Report

José Amalfitani Stadium, Buenos Aires
Referee: Eduardo Diuzniewski (Uruguay)

Vélez	Cartaginés

GK	1	(Paraguay) José Luis Chilavert
DF	17	(Argentina) Sebastián Méndez
DF		(Argentina) Flavio Zandoná
DF		(Argentina) Carlos Compagnucci
DF	3	(Argentina) Raúl Cardozo
MF	8	(Argentina) Marcelo Herrera
MF	5	(Argentina) Marcelo Gómez
MF	10	(Argentina) Patricio Camps	(substituted off) 76'
FW	20	(Argentina) Martín Posse
FW	9	(Argentina) Fernando Pandolfi	(substituted off) 80'
FW	11	(Argentina) José Flores	(substituted off) 78'
Substitutes:
FW	7	(Argentina) Guillermo Morigi	(substituted on) 76'
MF	21	(Argentina) Claudio Husaín	(substituted on) 78'
FW		(Argentina) Daniel Cordone	(substituted on) 80' (red card)
Manager:
(Argentina) Carlos Bianchi

GK	(Costa Rica) Hermidio Barrantes
DF	(Costa Rica) Evaristo Contreras
DF	(Costa Rica) Maximilien Peinado
DF	(Costa Rica) Henry Wood	Red card
DF	(Costa Rica) Marco Hidalgo
MF	(Costa Rica) Alexander Madrigal
MF	(Brazil) Luiz Claudio Dos Santos
MF	(Costa Rica) Alexander Gómez
FW	(Costa Rica) Jewisson Benneth
FW	(Costa Rica) Max Sánchez	(substituted off) 78'
FW	(Costa Rica) Everaldo da Costa	(substituted off) 63'
Substitutes:
FW	(Costa Rica) Heriberto Quirós	(substituted on) 78'
FW	(Costa Rica) Norman Pin Gómez	(substituted on) 63'
Manager:
(Costa Rica) Rolando Villalobos
