= Carlos Compagnucci =

Argentine football manager

Personal information
- Full name: Carlos Horacio Compagnucci
- Date of birth: 6 August 1968 (age 58)
- Place of birth: Monte Buey, Argentina
- Position: Midfielder

Team information
- Current team: Lanús (assistant)

Youth career
- 1986–1989: Vélez Sarsfield

Senior career*
Years	Team	Apps	(Gls)
1989–1999	Vélez Sarsfield	124	(0)
1989–1991	→ Deportivo Morón (loan)	67	(6)

Managerial career
- 2000–2001: Vélez Sarsfield (reserves)
- 2001: Vélez Sarsfield
- 2002: Instituto
- 2003–2004: Boca Juniors (assistant)
- 2005: Universitario de Deportes
- 2006–2007: Vélez Sarsfield (youth)
- 2008: Vélez Sarsfield (assistant)
- 2009–2010: Colo-Colo (assistant)
- 2010: Quilmes (assistant)
- 2011: Guaraní
- 2011–2012: Audax Italiano (assistant)
- 2012: Valencia (assistant)
- 2013–2015: Colo-Colo (assistant)
- 2013–2015: Estudiantes LP (assistant)
- 2015–2016: Independiente (assistant)
- 2016–2017: Alavés (assistant)
- 2017–2018: Southampton (assistant)
- 2018–2019: Leganés (assistant)
- 2020–2022: Vélez Sarsfield (assistant)
- 2022–2023: Universitario de Deportes
- 2023: Alianza Atlético
- 2024: Cádiz (assistant)
- 2025–: Lanús (assistant)
- * Club domestic league appearances and goals

Carlos Horacio Compagnucci (born 6 August 1968) is an Argentine football manager and former player who played as a midfielder. He is the current assistant manager of Lanús.

== Playing career ==
Born in Monte Buey, Córdoba Province, Compagnucci began his career at Vélez Sarsfield in 1989. Later in the year, he moved on loan to Deportivo Morón, and helped the side to win the 1989–90 Primera B Metropolitana.

Back to Vélez in 1991, Compagnucci started to feature more regularly in the main squad after the arrival of manager Carlos Bianchi, as a replacement for Marcelo Gómez. He suffered a serious knee injury in 1996, only returning in 1998 and subsequently retiring in the following year.

== Managerial career ==
After retiring, Compagnucci started working at his lifelong club Vélez, as a manager of the reserve sides. On 3 April 2001, he was named manager of the first team after Óscar Tabárez resigned, but he also presented his resignation on 30 August.

On 6 June 2002, Compagnucci was appointed Instituto manager. He left in November, and joined Bianchi's staff at Boca Juniors in 2003, as an assistant.

In October 2005, Compagnucci replaced José Basualdo at the helm of Peruvian side Universitario de Deportes. After leaving the side at the end of the year, he returned to Vélez as a youth manager, and was named Hugo Tocalli's assistant in the main squad in 2008; he subsequently followed Tocalli to Colo-Colo and Quilmes.

Compagnucci returned to managerial duties on 28 December 2010, after signing a contract with Paraguayan club Guaraní. He was sacked the following 24 February, and was subsequently named Omar Labruna's assistant at Audax Italiano before joining Mauricio Pellegrino's staff at Valencia.

Compagnucci returned to work with Labruna at Colo-Colo in 2013, before rejoining Pellegrino's staff at Estudiantes de La Plata, Independiente, Alavés, Southampton, Leganés and Vélez. On 16 June 2022, he returned to Universitario after 17 years, being named manager.

Compagnucci resigned from Universitario on 28 February 2023, after a poor start of the season. He remained in the country after being named in charge of fellow league team Alianza Atlético on 14 June.

In the following years, Compagnucci worked as Mauricio Pellegrino's assistant at Spanish club Cádiz and Lanús.

== Honours ==
=== Player ===
Deportivo Morón

- Primera B Metropolitana: 1989–90

Vélez Sarsfield

- Argentine Primera División: 1993 Clausura, 1995 Apertura, 1996 Clausura, 1998 Clausura
- Copa Libertadores: 1994
- Intercontinental Cup: 1994
- Copa Interamericana: 1994
- Supercopa Libertadores: 1996
- Recopa Sudamericana: 1997
