= 1997 Recopa Sudamericana =

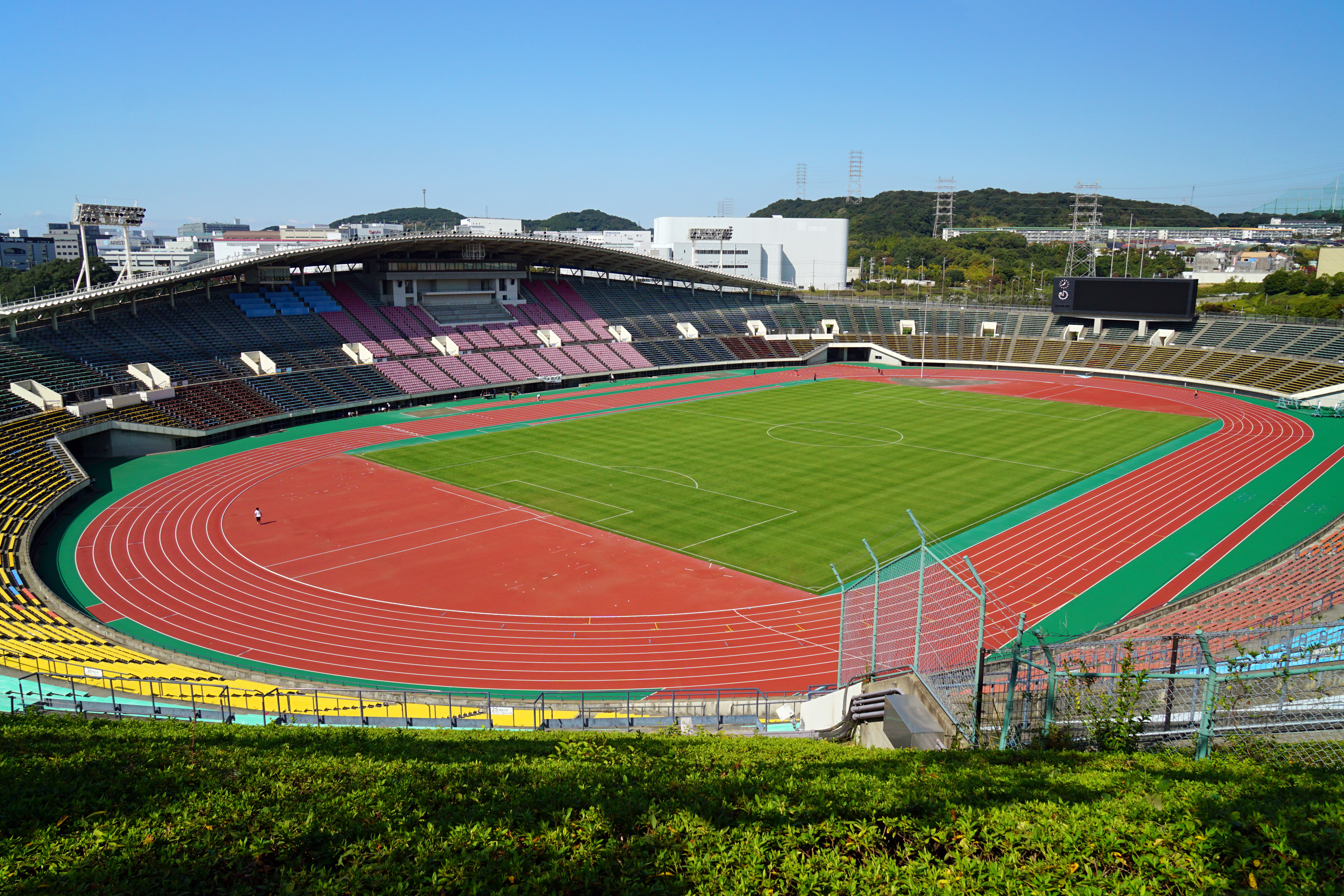
- Event: Recopa Sudamericana
River Plate	Vélez Sársfield
(Argentina)	(Argentina)
1	1
- Vélez Sársfield won the penalty shootout 2-4
- Date: April 13, 1997
- Venue: Universiade Memorial Stadium, Kobe
- Referee: Jorge Nieves (Uruguay)

The 1997 Recopa Sudamericana was the ninth Recopa Sudamericana, an annual football match between the winners of the previous season's Copa Libertadores and Supercopa Sudamericana competitions.

The match was contested between River Plate, winners of the 1996 Copa Libertadores, and Vélez Sársfield, winners of the 1996 Supercopa Sudamericana, on April 13, 1997. After a 1–1 draw, Vélez Sársfield managed to beat River Plate 4–2 on penalty shootout to win the trophy. Renowned goalkeeper José Luis Chilavert became the first ever goalkeeper to score a goal in the competition.

== Qualified teams ==
Team	Previous finals app.
(Argentina) River Plate	None
(Argentina) Vélez Sarsfield	1995

Bold indicates winning years

== Match details ==
1997 Recopa Sudamericana
April 13, 1997

River Plate (Argentina)	1–1	(Argentina) Vélez Sársfield
Francescoli 83' (pen.)	Report	Chilavert 29' (pen.)
Penalties
Francescoli (penalty scored); Gallardo (penalty missed); Trotta (penalty missed); Ayala (penalty scored)	2–4	(penalty missed) Chilavert; (penalty scored) Camps; (penalty scored) Pandolfi; (penalty scored) Zandoná; (penalty scored) Pellegrino

Universiade Memorial Stadium, Kobe
Referee: Jorge Nieves (Uruguay)

**River Plate**	**Vélez Sársfield**

GK	1	(Argentina) Roberto Bonano	(red card) 28'
DF	17	(Argentina) Roberto Trotta
DF	2	(Paraguay) Celso Ayala
DF	6	(Argentina) Eduardo Berizzo		(yellow card) (substituted off) 74'
DF	3	(Argentina) Juan Pablo Sorín
MF	8	(Argentina) Roberto Monserrat
MF	5	(Argentina) Leonardo Astrada
MF	22	(Argentina) Hernán Maisterra		(substituted off) 28'
MF	11	(Argentina) Sergio Berti		(substituted off) 60'
FW	9	(Uruguay) Enzo Francescoli
FW	7	(Argentina) Julio Ricardo Cruz
Substitutes:
GK	12	(Argentina) Germán Burgos		(substituted on) 28'
MF	10	(Argentina) Marcelo Gallardo		(substituted on) 60'
FW	21	(Argentina) Facundo Villalba		(substituted on) 74'
Manager:
(Argentina) Ramón Díaz

GK	1	(Paraguay) José Luis Chilavert
DF	4	(Argentina) Flavio Zandoná
DF		(Argentina) Víctor Sotomayor
DF	6	(Argentina) Mauricio Pellegrino
DF		(Argentina) Raúl Cardozo
MF		(Argentina) Guillermo Morigi	(substituted off) 76'
MF		(Argentina) Marcelo Gómez	(substituted off) 88'
MF		(Argentina) Claudio Husaín
MF		(Argentina) Christian Bassedas
FW	11	(Argentina) Martín Posse	Yellow card
FW	10	(Argentina) Patricio Camps
Substitutes:
MF	8	(Argentina) Marcelo Herrera	(substituted on) 76'
FW	12	(Argentina) Fernando Pandolfi	(substituted on) 88'
Manager:
(Argentina) Osvaldo Piazza

Assistant referees:
(Japan) Solishito Boskoito
(Japan) Elvieko Berugoshi
