= Sebastián Méndez =

Argentine footballer and manager

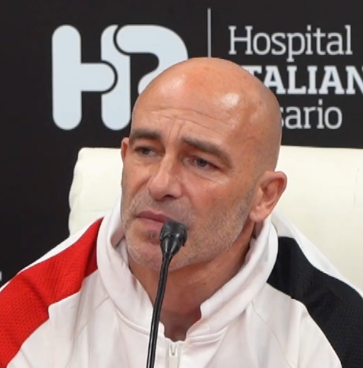
- Méndez in 2024

Personal information
- Full name: Sebastián Ariel Méndez Pardiñas
- Date of birth: 4 July 1977 (age 49)
- Place of birth: Buenos Aires, Argentina
- Height: 1.84 m (6 ft 0 in)
- Position: Centre-back

Youth career
- Vélez Sarsfield

Senior career*
Years	Team	Apps	(Gls)
1994–2002	Vélez Sarsfield	177	(3)
2002–2006	Celta	57	(0)
2006–2009	San Lorenzo	60	(2)
2009	Banfield	19	(0)
Total		313	(5)

International career
1999	Argentina	2	(0)

Managerial career
- 2010: San Lorenzo (caretaker)
- 2011: Banfield
- 2013–2014: Atlanta
- 2014: Platense
- 2015: Gimnasia Jujuy
- 2016–2017: Godoy Cruz
- 2017: Belgrano
- 2018: Palestino
- 2019: Cúcuta Deportivo
- 2019–2020: Gimnasia La Plata (assistant)
- 2021: Godoy Cruz
- 2021–2022: Club Tijuana
- 2023: Unión Santa Fe
- 2023: Vélez Sarsfield
- 2024: Newell's Old Boys
- 2025–2026: Juventud de Las Piedras
- * Club domestic league appearances and goals

Sebastián Ariel Méndez Pardiñas (born 4 July 1977) is an Argentine football manager and former player who played as a central defender.

As a player, Méndez won the Argentine Primera División with all three clubs he represented in his country, and also spent five seasons in Spain.

== Playing career ==
A native of Buenos Aires, Méndez started his career with Club Atlético Vélez Sarsfield. He made his debut in the Primera División on 24 July 1994 against Deportivo Español, aged only 17. During his tenure the club had the most sustained period of success in its history, collecting three leagues and other five international tournaments, with the player being an undisputed starter during his last six years.

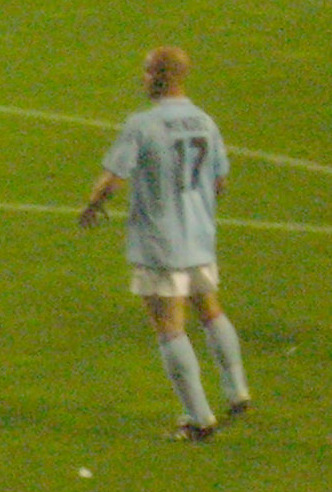
Méndez playing for Celta in 2005

In January 2002, Méndez moved to Spain to play for RC Celta de Vigo of La Liga, during the Galician team's heyday. He started rarely in his four-and-a-half-year spell (a maximum of 16 games in the 2004–05 season, with the side in Segunda División), but did amass 69 competitive appearances.

Méndez returned to his country in 2006, signing with San Lorenzo de Almagro and helping it to the following year's Clausura tournament to conquer his fourth league title. He took part in only a few matches during 2008, however, mostly because of constant injuries and erections.

Méndez was transferred to Club Atlético Banfield for the 2009–10 campaign, and was a key member of the squad that won the 2009 Apertura, appearing in all 19 games. On 13 December 2009, the club celebrated its first-ever Argentine top flight accolade but, shortly after, he announced his retirement from football at the age of 32.

== Coaching career ==
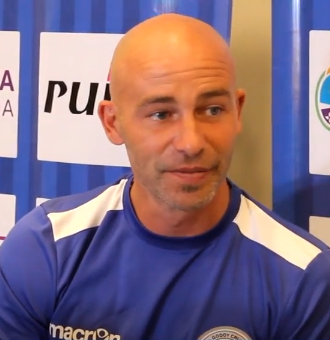
Méndez as manager of Godoy Cruz in 2016

On 4 April 2010, Méndez returned to San Lorenzo now as a caretaker manager, following Diego Simeone's dismissal. On 21 December he landed his first full-time job, in another of his former clubs, Banfield, where he replaced Julio César Falcioni.

From late 2019 to November 2020, Méndez was Diego Maradona's assistant coach in Gimnasia y Esgrima La Plata and acted as head coach in the matches Maradona could not attend. Following Maradona's death on 25 November 2020, he became Gimnasia caretaker manager but resigned on the next day.

== Managerial statistics ==
As of match played 4 April 2026

Managerial record by team and tenure
Team	Nat	From	To	Record							
Team	Nat	From	To	G	W	D	L	GF	GA	GD	Win %
San Lorenzo	(Argentina)	4 April 2010	16 May 2010	7	3	0	4	9	10	−1	42.86
Banfield	(Argentina)	1 January 2011	28 August 2011	23	7	6	10	24	31	−7	30.43
Atlanta	(Argentina)	20 June 2013	31 December 2013	15	6	6	3	11	8	+3	40.00
Platense	(Argentina)	1 January 2014	31 August 2014	29	12	9	8	40	30	+10	41.38
Gimnasia Jujuy	(Argentina)	2 January 2015	9 July 2015	24	9	8	7	24	24	+0	37.50
Godoy Cruz	(Argentina)	1 January 2016	31 December 2016	34	17	5	12	45	39	+6	50.00
Belgrano	(Argentina)	3 April 2017	17 October 2017	21	5	9	7	18	22	−4	23.81
Palestino	(Chile)	20 May 2018	8 October 2018	18	5	8	5	25	25	+0	27.78
Cúcuta Deportivo	(Colombia)	1 January 2019	30 June 2019	26	9	8	9	34	35	−1	34.62
Godoy Cruz	(Argentina)	11 January 2021	30 August 2021	23	8	4	11	30	39	−9	34.78
Tijuana	(Mexico)	21 October 2021	25 May 2022	22	6	7	9	21	32	−11	27.27
Unión Santa Fe	(Argentina)	11 April 2023	25 June 2023	11	4	5	2	11	7	+4	36.36
Vélez Sarsfield	(Argentina)	25 June 2023	9 December 2023	21	8	8	5	23	19	+4	38.10
Newell's Old Boys	(Argentina)	19 June 2024	15 September 2024	10	1	5	4	3	10	−7	10.00
Juventud	(Uruguay)	16 October 2025	5 April 2026	20	4	5	11	19	28	−9	20.00
Total				304	104	93	107	337	359	−22	34.21

== Honours ==
Vélez

- Argentine Primera División: Apertura 1995, Clausura 1996, Clausura 1998
- Copa Libertadores: 1994
- Intercontinental Cup: 1994
- Copa Interamericana: 1996
- Supercopa Sudamericana: 1996
- Recopa Sudamericana: 1997

San Lorenzo

- Argentine Primera División: Clausura 2007

Banfield

- Argentine Primera División: Apertura 2009
