= Sandro Guzmán =

Argentine footballer (born 1971)

Personal information
- Full name: Sandro Daniel Guzmán
- Date of birth: August 3, 1971 (age 55)
- Place of birth: Morón, Buenos Aires, Argentina
- Position: Goalkeeper

Senior career*
Years	Team	Apps	(Gls)
1994–1996	Vélez Sarsfield	16	(0)
1996–1997	Boca Juniors	18	(0)
1997	Deportivo Español	15	(0)
2000–2001	All Boys	12	(0)
2001	Atlético Tucumán	12	(0)
2002	Miami Strikers	0	(0)
2003	Argentino de Quilmes	0	(0)
Total		73	(0)
- * Club domestic league appearances and goals

Sandro Daniel Guzmán (born 3 August 1971) is an Argentine former professional footballer who played as a goalkeeper.

== Career ==
Guzmán started his career with Argentine side Vélez Sarsfield in 1994, and retired in 2003.

== Personal life ==
After retiring from professional football, Guzmán became a Rastafarian.

== Honours ==
Vélez Sarsfield

- Argentine Primera División (2): 1995 Apertura, 1996 Clausura
- Copa Libertadores (1): 1994
- Intercontinental Cup (1): 1994
- Copa Interamericana (1): 1996
