= José Luis Sánchez (Chilean footballer) =

Chilean footballer (born 1970)

Personal information
- Full name: José Luis Sánchez Moretti
- Date of birth: 9 January 1970 (age 56)
- Place of birth: Santiago, Chile
- Position: Forward

Youth career
- Estadio Español
- Unión Española

Senior career*
Years	Team	Apps	(Gls)
1988–1994	Unión Española	45	(10)
1989	→ Lozapenco (loan)	–	(–)
1991	→ Provincial Osorno (loan)	27	(10)
1992	→ Deportes La Serena (loan)	23	(6)
1994–1997	Vélez Sarsfield	28	(5)
1996	→ Universidad de Chile (loan)	20	(5)
1998	Granada		
1998	Deportes Iquique		
1999	Unión Española		
2000	Deportes Puerto Montt	22	(4)
2001	Bari	0	(0)
2001	Pisa	10	(0)
2001–2002	Locarno	16	(1)
2002–2003	Unión Española	29	(2)

International career
1992	Chile U23		

Managerial career
- 2013−2021: Unión Española (youth)
- 2021: Unión Española (assistant)
- * Club domestic league appearances and goals

José Luis Sánchez Moretti (born 9 January 1970) is a Chilean former professional footballer who played as a forward.

== Club career ==
A product of Unión Española youth system, in 1989 he played on loan at Deportes Lozapenco, winning the 1989 Tercera División. In Chile, he also played for Provincial Osorno, Deportes La Serena, Universidad de Chile, Deportes Iquique and Deportes Puerto Montt. Along with Unión Española, he won the 1993 Copa Chile, scoring 11 goals.

Along with Vélez Sarsfield, he won the 1994 Intercontinental Cup.

In 1999, he joined Unión Española in the Primera B, winning the championship and returning to the Chilean Primera División.

In other countries, he played for Granada in Spain, both Bari and Pisa in Italy and Locarno in Switzerland.

== International career ==
In 1992, Sánchez represented Chile at under-23 level in the Pre-Olympic Tournament. At senior level, he took part of the Chile squad in the friendly match versus Spain on 8 September 1993, but he didn't play.

== Coaching career ==
From 2013 to 2021, he worked in the Unión Española youth system, mainly at the under-14 and under-16 levels.

== Personal life ==
He was nicknamed Matador, later Mata'or, like the Spanish bullfighters.

== Honours ==
Lozapenco

- Tercera División de Chile: 1989

Unión Española

- Primera B de Chile: 1999
- Copa Chile: 1993

Vélez Sarsfield

- Argentine Primera División: 1995 Apertura
- Copa Libertadores: 1994
- Intercontinental Cup: 1994
