= Fabián Fernández =

Argentine footballer

Personal information
- Full name: Fabián Oscar Fernández
- Date of birth: 20 October 1968 (age 58)
- Place of birth: Coronel Suárez, Argentina
- Position: Forward

Senior career*
Years	Team	Apps	(Gls)
1988–1991	Sarmiento CS	–	(–)
1991–1994	Gimnasia La Plata	57	(16)
1994–1995	Vélez Sarsfield	18	(4)
1996	Universidad de Chile	0	(0)
1996–1997	Huracán Corrientes	25	(7)
1997–1998	Gimnasia de Jujuy	23	(4)
1998–1999	Olimpo	26	(7)
- * Club domestic league appearances and goals

Fabián Oscar Fernández (born 20 October 1968) is an Argentine former professional footballer who played as a forward.

== Career ==
Born in Coronel Suárez, Argentina, Fernández started his career with the local club, Sarmiento before joining Gimnasia La Plata in the 1991–92 Argentine Primera División.

In 1994, Fernández joined Vélez Sarsfield and won the 1994 Copa Libertadores, the 1994 Intercontinental Cup and the 1995 Apertura.

In January 1996, Fernández moved abroad and signed with Universidad de Chile. After having no chances to make appearances at league level and playing in friendlies, he returned to his homeland to play for Huracán Corrientes.

In his last years, Fernández played for Gimnasia y Esgrima de Jujuy and Olimpo.

== Personal life ==
He was nicknamed Pícaro (Cunning).
