= Fernando Pandolfi =

Argentine footballer

Personal information
- Full name: Fernando Daniel Pandolfi
- Date of birth: May 29, 1974 (age 52)
- Place of birth: Buenos Aires, Argentina
- Height: 1.82 m (6 ft 0 in)
- Position: Forward

Youth career
- Vélez Sarsfield

Senior career*
Years	Team	Apps	(Gls)
1993–2000	Vélez Sarsfield	104	(22)
1997	→ Perugia (loan)	9	(0)
2000–2001	Boca Juniors	11	(0)
2001–2002	Vélez Sarsfield	1	(0)
Total		125	(22)

International career
1999	Argentina	2	(0)
- * Club domestic league appearances and goals

Fernando Daniel Pandolfi (born May 29, 1974, in Buenos Aires) is a former Argentine football striker who played most of his career for Argentine Primera División club Vélez Sarsfield. He was part of the successful team that won several trophies during the mid-1990s, including the Copa Libertadores and the Intercontinental Cup.

== Career ==
=== Club ===
Nicknamed Rifle, Pandolfi started his professional career with Vélez Sársfield. He was often compared to Uruguayan star Enzo Francescoli due to their similar characteristics on the field. Pandolfi played 104 games with the club between 1994 and 2000. He also made a short spell on loan in the Italian Serie A with Perugia in 1997.

Towards the end of his career, Pandolfi signed for Boca Juniors. As a Xeneize, he replicated the success once achieved with Vélez by winning the Copa Libertadores and Intercontinental Cup, but this time in consecutive years. He left Boca without scoring a league goal, but scored five in international competitions. In 2002, while making his third spell with Vélez Sarsfield, Pandolfi announced his retirement from football at the age of 28.

=== National team ===
Pandolfi played two friendly matches with the Argentina national team in 1999 during Marcelo Bielsa's coaching era.

== After football ==
In 2002 Pandolfi retired from football to dedicate himself entirely to music with his band, Actitud Sospechosa. In the same year, he was invited onstage by Los Piojos during a show at the Luna Park stadium to play guitar on their cover of Chuck Berry's "Around & Around". They released one album, Rockable.

== Honours ==
Vélez Sarsfield

- Copa Libertadores (1): 1994
- Intercontinental Cup (1): 1994
- Argentine Primera División (3): 1995 Apertura, 1996 Clausura, 1998 Clausura
- Copa Interamericana (1): 1995
- Supercopa Sudamericana (1): 1996
- Recopa Sudamericana (1): 1997

Boca Juniors

- Argentine Primera División (1): 2000 Apertura
- Intercontinental Cup (1): 2000
- Copa Libertadores (1): 2001
