= Marcelo Herrera (footballer, born 1966) =

Argentine footballer and manager

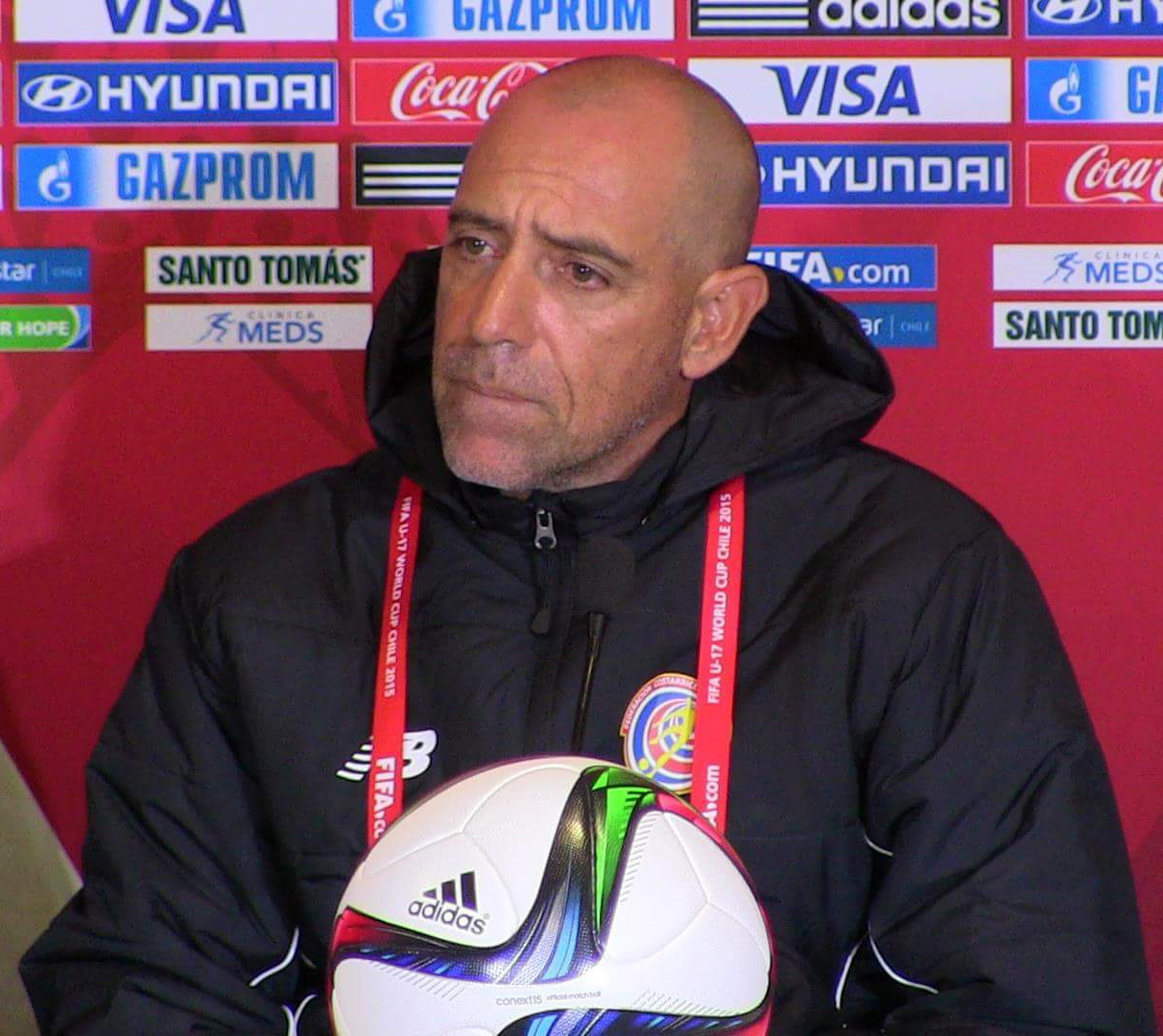

Personal information
- Full name: Marcelo Hugo Herrera
- Date of birth: October 5, 1966 (age 60)
- Place of birth: San Salvador de Jujuy, Argentina
- Height: 1.79 m (5 ft 10 in)
- Position: Midfielder

Team information
- Current team: Gimnasia Jujuy (Manager)

Youth career
- Gimnasia y Tiro

Senior career*
Years	Team	Apps	(Gls)
1992–1994	Gimnasia y Tiro	77	(11)
1994–1997	Vélez Sársfield	85	(15)
1997	Gimnasia de Jujuy	16	(4)
1998	Miami Fusion	17	(5)
1998	Belgrano	18	(1)
1999	Platense	6	(1)
1999–2001	Gimnasia de Jujuy	51	(3)
Total		270	(40)

Managerial career
- 2007–2008: Vélez Sarsfield (assistant)
- 2008–2009: Alajuelense
- 2010: Real Potosi
- 2010: Pérez Zeledón
- 2012–2014: Boca Juniors (assistant)
- 2014–2015: Costa Rica U-20
- 2015: Costa Rica U-17
- 2016–2017: Costa Rica U-20
- 2018: Costa Rica U-23
- 2019–: Gimnasia Jujuy
- * Club domestic league appearances and goals

Marcelo Hugo Herrera (born October 5, 1966, in San Salvador de Jujuy), nicknamed Popeye, is a retired Argentine football midfielder. He usually played on the right wing. He was part of Vélez Sársfield successful 1990s era, winning 2 domestic and 3 international championships with the club. He is currently the manager of Gimnasia Jujuy.

== Playing career ==
Herrera started playing professionally for Salta's club Gimnasia y Tiro in 1992. He was bought by Vélez Sársfield in 1994 and was part of the first team in the club's history to obtain two championships in a row, the Apertura and Clausura of the 1995-96 season. He was Vélez top-scorer on that Clausura tournament, along Patricio Camps, with 7 goals each.

His only playing experience outside Argentina was a 6-month period at MLS' Miami Fusion. He retired in 2001, playing for his hometown club Gimnasia de Jujuy.

== Coaching career ==
In 2007, Herrera worked as an assistant manager for Hugo Tocalli in Vélez Sársfield. One year later, he was signed as manager of LD Alajuelense in the Costa Rican Primera División. In 2013, Herrera works as an assistant manager for Carlos Bianchi in Boca Juniors.

== Honours ==
Vélez Sársfield

- Primera División Argentina (2): 1995 Apertura, 1996 Clausura
- Intercontinental Cup (1): 1994
- Supercopa Sudamericana (1): 1996
- Recopa Sudamericana (1): 1997
