= Zandona =

Zandona is a surname. Notable people with the surname include:

- Flavio Zandoná (born 1967), Argentine footballer
- Gabrio Zandonà (born 1977), Italian sailor
