= Guillermo Morigi =

Argentine footballer

Personal information
- Full name: Guillermo Carlos Morigi
- Date of birth: March 1, 1974 (age 52)
- Place of birth: Caseros, Argentina
- Height: 1.75 m (5 ft 9 in)
- Position: Left winger

Youth career
- Vélez Sársfield

Senior career*
Years	Team	Apps	(Gls)
1993–1997	Vélez Sársfield	59	(9)
1997–1999	Valencia	15	(1)
1999–2002	Vélez Sársfield	78	(9)
2002	Racing	5	(0)
2003–2004	Barcelona SC	14	(2)
Total		171	(21)

International career
1996	Argentina	1	(0)
- * Club domestic league appearances and goals

Guillermo Carlos Morigi (born March 1, 1974) is an Argentine former professional football left winger who played for Vélez Sársfield in the Primera División Argentina throughout most of his career. He was part of the team during its most successful years, the 1990s.

== Club career ==
Morigi was born in Caseros, Buenos Aires province. He started his career with Vélez Sársfield of the Argentine First Division. He was part of the first team in the history of the club to achieve two consecutive championships, the Apertura and Clausura of the 1995–96 season. He also won with the team the 1996 Supercopa Sudamericana and 1997 Recopa Sudamericana.

For the 1997–98 season Morigi was sold to Spanish La Liga side Valencia CF. However, as most of Vélez Sársfield's 1990s multi champions, he was not successful outside his first team. He played 15 games for Valencia and scored 1 goal, in a 4–3 victory over FC Barcelona. He was also part of the squad that won the 1998 UEFA Intertoto Cup, and played some minutes in the first final against Austria Salzburg. Morigi was also part of the squad that won de 1998–99 Copa del Rey, having played for the club during the first half of the season-long championship.

He returned to Vélez in 1999 and played for the team until 2002. He then had a short spell at Racing and Ecuadorian Barcelona SC, where he suffered a serious knee injury. He was released from his contract in 2004, and immediately retired at the age of 30.

== International career ==
Morigi played a friendly match for the Argentina national team in 1996, while he was playing for Vélez.

== Post-playing career ==
In 2008 Morigi won a trial against Barcelona SC for unpaid salary. Ecuadorian justice put an embargo on the team's stadium, the Estadio Monumental Banco Pichincha, to secure payment. He then went on to work as a football agent with the New Player Agent Corp.

== Honours ==
Vélez Sársfield

- Argentine Primera División: Apertura 1995, Clausura 1996
- Supercopa Sudamericana: 1996
- Recopa Sudamericana: 1997

Valencia

- UEFA Intertoto Cup: 1998
- Copa del Rey: 1998–99
