= Christian Bassedas =

Argentine football manager (born 1973)

Personal information
- Full name: Christian Gustavo Bassedas
- Date of birth: 16 February 1973 (age 53)
- Place of birth: Buenos Aires, Argentina
- Height: 1.78 m (5 ft 10 in)
- Position: Midfielder

Youth career
- Vélez Sársfield

Senior career*
Years	Team	Apps	(Gls)
1990–2000	Vélez Sársfield	267	(21)
2000–2003	Newcastle United	24	(1)
2002	→ Tenerife (loan)	14	(0)
Total		305	(22)

International career
1996	Argentina Olympic		
1994–1999	Argentina	22	(0)

Managerial career
- 2015–2016: Vélez Sarsfield
- 2017: Boca Unidos
- 2017–2018: Olimpo
- 2018–2020: UAI Urquiza
Medal record
Men's football
Representing Argentina
Olympic Games
Silver medal – second place	1996 Atlanta	Team competition
Pan American Games
Gold medal – first place	1995 Mar del Plata	Team competition
- * Club domestic league appearances and goals

Christian Gustavo Bassedas (born 16 February 1973) is an Argentine former footballer who played as a midfielder.

Bassedas made 267 appearances for Vélez Sársfield, giving him the eleventh most appearances in club history. He is currently the head coach of UAI Urquiza.

== Career ==
=== Club ===
Bassedas is a product of Vélez Sársfield youth divisions, club where he debuted professionally on 3 March 1991. He was an important part of Vélez most successful years during the 1990s. He won four national championships with the club, and five international (including the 1994 Intercontinental Cup, where he was a starter in the 2–0 victory over A.C. Milan).

In 2000, he joined English FA Premier League club Newcastle United for £3,500,000. He played for them in the period 2000–2003, though on loan to Tenerife briefly during the 2001–02 season. He scored once in the league for Newcastle in a 3–1 defeat at Chelsea in January 2001.

In 2003, he joined Argentine Newell's Old Boys, but after two months of pre-season training he decided to retire from football at the age of 30.

He later worked for Fox Sports en Latinoamérica as a commentator on FA Premier League matches.

=== International ===
Bassedas played for the Argentina national team during the 1998 FIFA World Cup qualification matches, but was not part of the squad for the World Cup. He also won a silver medal at the 1996 Olympics and a gold medal at the 1995 Pan Americans, where he captained the team.

=== Management ===
At the end of 2008, Bassedas was appointed as sports consultant of Vélez Sársfield of the Argentine Primera División. His first order of business was to recommend Ricardo Gareca to fill the coaching spot. He was also essential in the negotiations to bring Maximiliano Moralez, Sebastián Domínguez and Joaquín Larrivey to the club. In his first season with the club, Vélez won the Clausura 09.

In November 2015, he was appointed as manager of Vélez Sársfield. He resigned in September 2016, after a 0–3 loss against Racing Club, citing the violent reaction Vélez supporters as his reason for leaving.

He was appointed as the head coach of Club Olimpo on 20 December 2017.

On 6 October 2018, Bassedas was appointed as the head coach of UAI Urquiza.

As a sporting director, Bassedas held the charge in Paraguayan club Olimpia in 2020–21, and Vélez Sarsfield from 2021 to 2023 before moving to Chile and joining Audax Italiano in December 2024. he was released on 2 February 2026.

== Honours ==
=== Player ===
==== Club ====
Vélez Sársfield

- Primera División Argentina (4): Clausura 93, Apertura 95, Clausura 96, Clausura 98
- Copa Libertadores (1): 1994
- Intercontinental Cup (1): 1994
- Copa Interamericana (1): 1994
- Supercopa Sudamericana (1): 1996
- Recopa Sudamericana (1): 1997

==== International ====
- Pan American Games Gold Medal (1): Mar del Plata 1995
- Olympic Silver Medal (1): Atlanta 1996

=== General manager ===
Vélez Sársfield

- Primera División Argentina (1): Clausura 09
