= José Luis Chilavert =

Paraguayan footballer (born 1965)

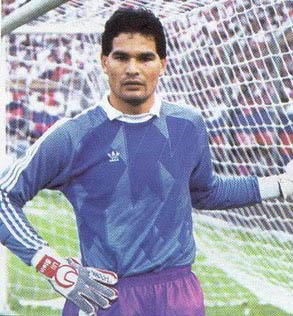
- Chilavert in 1985, while playing for Argentine side San Lorenzo

Personal information
- Full name: José Luis Félix Chilavert González
- Date of birth: 27 July 1965 (age 61)
- Place of birth: Luque, Paraguay
- Height: 1.88 m (6 ft 2 in)
- Position: Goalkeeper

Senior career*
Years	Team	Apps	(Gls)
1982–1984	Sportivo Luqueño	67	(4)
1984–1985	Guaraní	19	(1)
1985–1988	San Lorenzo	122	(0)
1988–1991	Real Zaragoza	79	(1)
1991–2000	Vélez Sarsfield	266	(36)
2000–2002	Strasbourg	50	(0)
2002–2003	Peñarol	14	(4)
2003–2004	Vélez Sarsfield	0	(0)
Total		617	(46)

International career
1989–2003	Paraguay	74	(8)
- * Club domestic league appearances and goals

José Luis Félix Chilavert González (Spanish pronunciation: [ˌxoseˈlwis ˌtʃilaˈβeɾt ɣonˈsales]; born 27 July 1965) is a Paraguayan former professional footballer who played as a goalkeeper for Sportivo Luqueño, Guaraní, San Lorenzo de Almagro, Real Zaragoza, Vélez Sarsfield, RC Strasbourg, Peñarol and the Paraguay national team.

Chilavert won 12 club titles, including the 1994 Copa Libertadores and the 1994 Intercontinental Cup, while playing for Vélez Sarsfield, and is a three-time IFFHS World's Best Goalkeeper award winner. He also appeared for the Paraguay national team in 74 matches from 1989 to 2003, including two FIFA World Cup tournaments (1998 and 2002), where he served as captain on both occasions, and appeared in three Copa América tournaments (1991, 1993, and 1997). Chilavert was included in the 1998 FIFA World Cup Team of the Tournament

A fast and agile shot-stopper, Chilavert was regarded as one of the best goalkeepers in the world in his prime. He was also known for his outfield skills and ability as a free kick specialist, and often took penalties. He scored 67 goals in his professional career, including eight for his national team. Four of his international goals were scored during Paraguay's qualification for the 2002 FIFA World Cup. Chilavert is the second-highest goalscoring goalkeeper of all time, surpassed only by Brazilian keeper Rogerio Ceni, and is one of only three goalkeepers to score a hat-trick.

The player was also known for his eccentricity, strong personality and fiery temper, which brought him his fair share of controversies; most notorious among them was his being sent off in 1997 for brawling with Colombian striker Faustino Asprilla. He was nicknamed "El Buldog" ("The Bulldog") and often wore a cartoon bulldog on his goalkeeper jersey.

Chilavert ran for president of Paraguay in the 2023 general election under the Party of the Youth, getting less than 1% of the popular vote.

== Early years ==
Chilavert grew up in Luque, Gran Asunción, in a poor family, and walked barefoot until the age of seven. His parents were Catalino Chilavert, a state bureaucrat, and Nicolasa González. At the age of five, he had three siblings and two responsibilities: to milk cows and sell the milk in Ñu Guazú, a rural suburb of Luque. One of his siblings, Rolando Chilavert, was also a football player.

== Club career ==
Chilavert made his footballing debut with Sportivo Luqueño, where he was trained by Modesto Sandoval. In 1989, he played for the Paraguay national team for the first time.

He later moved to Spain, where he played for Real Zaragoza. In 1988, whilst Chilavert played for Real Zaragoza, he stated that "the fans used to freak out" when he would come out with the ball at his feet and "scream at me to get back in goal. I've never stopped to think about what others are saying. I just rely on my abilities. Later on, I started to practice penalties and free kicks until they gave me the job for real". Chilavert admitted to staying behind after training to practice 80 to 120 free kicks, which in his opinion was how he got better.

After his time at Real Zaragoza, he moved to Argentina, where he played with Vélez Sársfield, helping them win the Primera División four times, as well as the Copa Libertadores and the Intercontinental Cup, both in 1994. In 1999, he became the first goalkeeper known to score a hat-trick in the history of professional football, while playing for Vélez against Ferro Carril Oeste, scoring all three goals through penalties. He also scored a free kick from behind the half-way line against River Plate.

In the 2001 Coupe de France Final, Chilavert scored the winning penalty for RC Strasbourg in the shootout victory over Amiens.

== International career ==
Chilavert was voted World Goalkeeper of the Year by the IFFHS in 1995, 1997, and 1998. He was sent off alongside Faustino Asprilla in a South American qualifying match world the 1998 World Cup against Colombia, in which Asprilla had to convince a hitman to not murder Chilavert afterwards. Chilavert participated in the 1998 World Cup with Paraguay, where he became the first goalkeeper ever to take a direct free kick in the World Cup finals, almost scoring against Bulgaria. With two clean sheets in the first round, he helped take Paraguay to the round of sixteen, where the team lost to France on a golden goal scored by Laurent Blanc. Chilavert had made boasts about being the Cup's best goalkeeper before the tournament, and after the tournament, FIFA indeed named Chilavert on the tournament All-Star Squad for his performances, alongside French goalkeeper Fabien Barthez.

Chilavert refused to take part in the 1999 Copa América, angering the Paraguayan government, as he claimed funding should be used for education.

FIFA gave Chilavert a four-game suspension (later reduced to three) for spitting on Brazil's Roberto Carlos at the conclusion of a 2002 FIFA World Cup qualification game. As a result, he watched Paraguay's first game of the 2002 World Cup against South Africa from the stands. Chilavert accused Roberto Carlos of racism and of making obscene gestures during the match. Chilavert later claimed that Roberto Carlos came up to him after the match and said "Indian, we have won 2–0, you are a disaster". He also justified his action by saying he had been provoked by the Brazilians, who had called him the weakest link of Paraguay before the match, and also claimed the match was like a war and that Brazil should return land to Paraguay lost in the War of the Triple Alliance in the 19th century.

Before the 2002 FIFA World Cup, Paraguay manager Cesare Maldini had faced criticism in Paraguay, but Chilavert defended Maldini for his experience. He also expressed great confidence in the ability of the Paraguayan team and downplayed his role on the team. During the World Cup, Chilavert made an error against Spain on Morientes' 2–1 goal as Paraguay lost 3–1. Chilavert almost redeemed himself later with a good free kick attempt, but the shot was saved by Casillas. Before the match, Chilavert had vowed to score against Spain if Paraguay got a free kick "within range". Before the last match in the group stage, Paraguay had to beat Slovenia and Spain had to beat South Africa, with a combined margin of three goals, for Paraguay to go through to the last 16. The match started badly for Paraguay, with Carlos Paredes sent off in the 21st minute, and continued with Milenko Ačimovič taking the lead for the Slovenians right before half-time after Chilavert failed to grip the ball and allowed it to slip between his legs into the goal. But Paraguay – inspired by substitutes Nelson Cuevas and Jorge Campos – recovered to defeat Slovenia 3–1, scoring three times in the last 25 minutes, and when Spain also defeated South Africa 3–2, that victory meant that Paraguay was through to the next round, where they would play Germany. In their second-round match against Germany, despite several saves from Chilavert, Paraguay lost 1–0, courtesy of a late Oliver Neuville goal.

In total, Chilavert earned 74 international caps for Paraguay between 1989 and 2003, and achieved a goalkeeper record of eight international goals. He retired from international football in 2003.

== Retirement and post-career ==
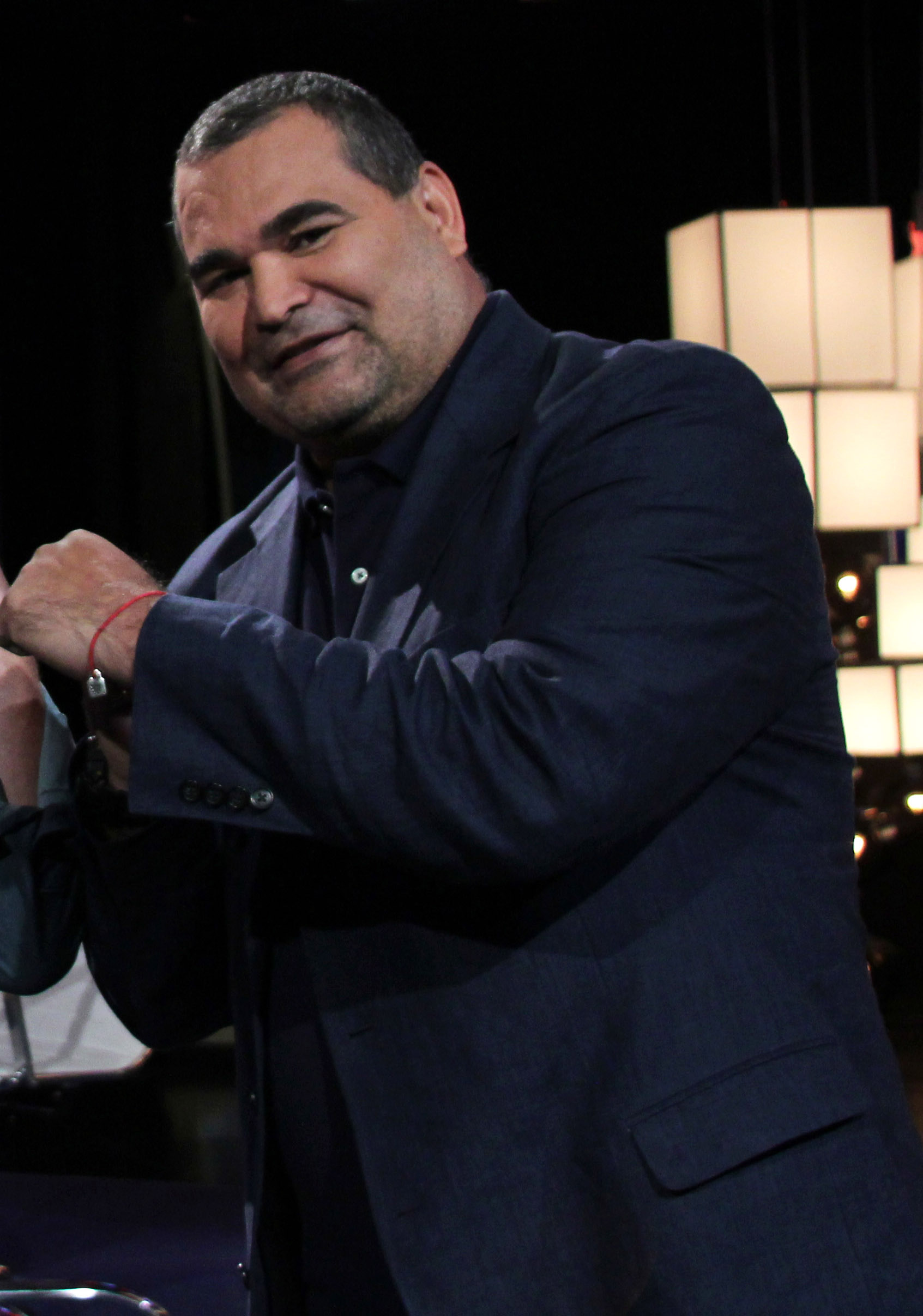
Chilavert in 2014, during an interview aired by La TV Pública of Argentina

Chilavert announced his retirement from football in December 2003, but decided to come out of retirement to return to Vélez. Chilavert had just won the Uruguayan league with Peñarol when he initially retired. He finally retired permanently in 2004, playing his last match, a farewell testimonial, on 11 November of that year – fittingly, he scored a goal.

In 2005, Chilavert received a suspended six-month prison sentence in France for the use of false documents related to the compensation for the end of his contract with Strasbourg.

Chilavert was a commentator for American television network Univision during the 2006 FIFA World Cup and 2010 FIFA World Cup, alongside Jorge Pérez-Navarro. Chilavert vowed that if he had gone to the 2006 FIFA World Cup in Germany, he would have tried again to become the first goalkeeper to score a goal.

== Personal life and personality ==
Chilavert is married to Marcela, an English language teacher he met in Buenos Aires while playing for San Lorenzo de Almagro. In 1998, they had a daughter named Anahí.

=== Controversies ===
Chilavert has allegedly thrown punches at Faustino Asprilla and Diego Maradona. He was suspended for four matches for his altercation with the former that occurred during a World Cup qualifier in 1997.

He once received a suspended prison sentence for attacking a physiotherapist.

Chilavert was a guest commentator for Univision during the Copa América Centenario but was removed from the broadcasts after CONMEBOL President Alejandro Dominguez told the network to remove Chilavert. Chilavert had criticized Dominguez and called him corrupt on the air during Paraguay's Group A match against Colombia.

In 2018, Chilavert called for the expulsion of the British ambassador to Paraguay Matthew Hedges after the latter made controversial statements about the conviction of 12 farmers in a case relating to the violent deaths of six police officers and 11 rural workers in 2012. During the altercation, Chilavert made anglophobic and homophobic comments, the latter referencing Hedges's homosexuality, calling him 'anormal'.

==== Transphobic comments ====
In 2026, Chilavert made transphobic comments against Kylian Mbappé after a Champions League match with Benfica, stating "it is not normal for a man to live with a transvestite, for that there is a woman".

==== Racism allegations ====
Shortly before Paraguay's round of 16 match against France in the 2026 FIFA World Cup, Chilavert stated in an interview that, "In 1998 we faced the French and now Paraguay will face a squad from Africa." These comments generated controversy with the remarks being strongly condemned as racist by French Football Federation president Philippe Diallo.

=== Leadership and morality ===
Chilavert defended Cesare Maldini from press criticism when Maldini was appointed as Paraguay's coach for the 2002 FIFA World Cup. Chilavert stated that "About 90% of sports journalists in Paraguay are incompetent" and welcomed criticism following Paraguay's performance in Korea and Japan if they were to perform poorly.

During his career, Chilavert was touted as Paraguay's future president. Chilavert was labelled "a revolutionary the kind of which South America has not seen since the days of Che Guevara."

Chilavert refused to participate at the 1999 Copa América on home soil, complaining about the incompetence of the local directors. Despite being officially honoured by the government, he said that his country should invest money in education rather than football. Chilavert also routinely dismissed his country's politicians as corrupt, incompetent and responsible for keeping many Paraguayans in poverty. He claimed that when his playing days were over, he would stand for president and enforce his own brand of law and order.

During 2008 and 2009, the former goalkeeper demonstrated his support for Paraguayan Olympic thrower Edgar Baumann against corruption in Paraguayan sport when the athlete had been robbed of his right to compete at the 2000 Sydney Olympics due to a scandal from the Paraguayan Olympic Committee. Chilavert supported Baumann during the lawsuit which had been filed against the Olympic Committee with Chilavert stated that the then president of the Olympic Committee, Ramón Zubizarreta, should be expulsed for hurting athletes and not giving them benefits.

In 2009, Chilavert, along with Claudio Escauriza, Tomás Orué and lawyer Alejandro Rubin, attended a Press Conference at Asunción Shopping Centre Shopping del Sol, in support of Edgar Baumann, who had received a favourable ruling from the Paraguay Supreme Court in a case against the Paraguay Olympic Committee president Ramón Zubizarreta for robbing him the right of competing at the 2000 Summer Olympics and also taking his sums of money that he earned from his scholarship.

== Career statistics ==
=== Club ===
Appearances and goals by club, season and competition
Club	Season	League			Cup		Continental		Other		Total	
Club	Season	Division	Apps	Goals	Apps	Goals	Apps	Goals	Apps	Goals	Apps	Goals
Sportivo Luqueño	1982	Paraguayan Primera División	30	0	–		–		–		30	0
Sportivo Luqueño	1983	Paraguayan Primera División	37	4	–		–		–		37	4
Sportivo Luqueño	1984	Paraguayan Primera División	0	0	–		3	0	–		3	0
Sportivo Luqueño	Total		67	4	0	0	3	0	0	0	70	4
Guaraní	1984	Paraguayan Primera División	19	1	–		–		–		19	1
San Lorenzo	1985	Argentine Primera División	10	0	–		–		–		10	0
San Lorenzo	1985–86	Argentine Primera División	38	0	–		–		–		38	0
San Lorenzo	1986–87	Argentine Primera División	31	0	–		–		–		31	0
San Lorenzo	1987–88	Argentine Primera División	43	0	–		–		–		43	0
San Lorenzo	Total		122	0	0	0	0	0	0	0	122	0
Real Zaragoza	1988–89	La Liga	37	0	2	0	–		–		39	0
Real Zaragoza	1989–90	La Liga	34	1	4	0	4	0	–		42	1
Real Zaragoza	1990–91	La Liga	8	0	1	0	–		–		9	0
Real Zaragoza	Total		79	1	7	0	4	0	0	0	90	1
Vélez Sarsfield	1991–92	Argentine Primera División	18	0	–		–		4 (Note: Four appearances in 1993 Copa Libertadores playoff (liguilla))	0	22	0
Vélez Sarsfield	1992–93	Argentine Primera División	30	1	–		0	0	–		30	1
Vélez Sarsfield	1993–94	Argentine Primera División	23	0	–		13	0	–		36	0
Vélez Sarsfield	1994–95	Argentine Primera División	34	1	–		4	0	2 (Note: One appearances in 1994 Intercontinental Cup, one appearance in 1995 Recopa Sudamericana)	0	40	1
Vélez Sarsfield	1995–96	Argentine Primera División	34	4	–		2	0	2 (Note: Two appearances in 1996 Copa Interamericana)	0	38	4
Vélez Sarsfield	1996–97	Argentine Primera División	24	6	–		16	4	1 (Note: One appearance, one goal in 1997 Recopa Sudamericana)	1	41	11
Vélez Sarsfield	1997–98	Argentine Primera División	35	10	–		6	2	–		41	12
Vélez Sarsfield	1998–99	Argentine Primera División	26	4	–		17	2	–		43	6
Vélez Sarsfield	1999–2000	Argentine Primera División	34	8	–		2	0	–		36	8
Vélez Sarsfield	2000–01	Argentine Primera División	8	2	–		6	3	–		14	5
Vélez Sarsfield	Total		266	36	0	0	66	11	9	1	341	48
Strasbourg	2000–01	Division 1	17	0	5	1	–		0	0	22	1
Strasbourg	2001–02	Division 2	33	0	4	0	2	0	5 (Note: Four appearances in Coupe de la Ligue, one appearances in Trophée des champions)	0	44	0
Strasbourg	2002–03	Division 1	0	0	0	0	–		0	0	0	0
Strasbourg	Total		50	0	9	1	2	0	5	0	66	1
Peñarol	2003	Uruguayan Primera División	14	4	–		0	0	1 (Note: One appearances in Championship playoffs)	0	15	4
Vélez Sarsfield	2003–04	Argentine Primera División	0	0	–		6	0	–		6	0
Career total			617	46	16	1	81	11	15	1	729	59

=== International ===
Appearances and goals by national team and year
National team	Year	Apps	Goals
Paraguay	1989	2	1
Paraguay	1990	0	0
Paraguay	1991	6	0
Paraguay	1992	0	0
Paraguay	1993	10	1
Paraguay	1994	0	0
Paraguay	1995	0	0
Paraguay	1996	7	1
Paraguay	1997	9	1
Paraguay	1998	10	0
Paraguay	1999	3	0
Paraguay	2000	13	2
Paraguay	2001	7	2
Paraguay	2002	5	0
Paraguay	2003	2	0
Total		74	8

Scores and results list Paraguay's goal tally first, score column indicates score after each Chilavert goal.

List of international goals scored by José Luis Chilavert
No.	Date	Venue	Opponent	Score	Result	Competition
1	27 August 1989	Estadio Defensores del Chaco, Asunción, Paraguay	Colombia	2–1	2–1	1990 World Cup qualifier
2	15 August 1993	Estadio Defensores del Chaco, Asunción, Paraguay	Peru	2–0	2–1	1994 World Cup qualifier
3	1 September 1996	Estadio Monumental, Buenos Aires, Argentina	Argentina	1–1	1–1	1998 World Cup qualifier
4	17 June 1997	Estadio Félix Capriles, Cochabamba, Bolivia	Argentina	1–0	1–1	1997 Copa América
5	7 October 2000	Estadio El Campín, Bogotá, Colombia	Colombia	2–0	2–0	2002 World Cup qualifier
6	15 November 2000	Estadio Defensores del Chaco, Asunción, Paraguay	Peru	5–1	5–1	2002 World Cup qualifier
7	5 September 2001	Estadio Defensores del Chaco, Asunción, Paraguay	Bolivia	3–1	5–1	2002 World Cup qualifier
8	7 October 2001	Estadio Defensores del Chaco, Asunción, Paraguay	Argentina	1–0	2–2	2002 World Cup qualifier

== Honours ==
Guarani

- Primera División: 1984

Vélez Sársfield

- Primera División: 1993 Clausura, 1995 Apertura, 1996 Clausura, 1998 Clausura
- Copa Libertadores: 1994
- Intercontinental Cup: 1994
- Copa Interamericana: 1994 (played in 1996)
- Supercopa Sudamericana: 1996
- Recopa Sudamericana: 1997

Strasbourg

- Coupe de France: 2000–01

Peňarol

- Primera División: 2003

Individual

- Equipo Ideal de América: 1994, 1995, 1996, 1997, 1998, 1999
- IFFHS World's Best Goalkeeper: 1995, 1997, 1998
- Footballer of the Year of Argentina: 1996
- South American Footballer of the Year: 1996
- FIFA World Cup: All-star team 1998
- FIFA XI: 2001
- World Soccer: The 100 Greatest Footballers of All Time
- IFFHS Legends
- Copa América Historical Dream Team: 2011
