= Marcelo Gómez =

Argentine footballer and manager

Personal information
- Full name: Marcelo Adrián Gómez
- Date of birth: 8 December 1970 (age 55)
- Place of birth: Buenos Aires, Argentina
- Height: 1.77 m (5 ft 10 in)
- Position: Defensive midfielder

Youth career
- Vélez Sársfield

Senior career*
| Years | Team | Apps | (Gls) |
| 1990–1997 | Vélez Sársfield | 190 | (3) |
| 1998–2003 | River Plate | 33 | (1) |
| 2000 | → Gimnasia La Plata (loan) | 34 | (5) |
| 2001 | → Al-Ittihad (loan) | | |
| 2001–2002 | → Huracán (loan) | 11 | (0) |
| 2003–2004 | Alajuelense | | |

International career
| 1995 | Argentina | 1 | (0) |

Managerial career
- 2011–2018: Vélez Sársfield B (assistant)
- 2017: Vélez Sársfield (caretaker)
- 2019: Godoy Cruz
- 2021: Zamora
- * Club domestic league appearances and goals

Marcelo Adrián Gómez (born 8 December 1970) is an Argentine football manager and former player who played as a defensive midfielder.

Gómez is best known for his seven-year period (1990–1997) in Vélez Sársfield, where he played 189 games (4 goals) and won 8 titles.

== Club career ==
Gómez was formed in Vélez Sársfield's youth divisions. He made his first team debut in 1990, and played with the team until 1997. During the period, he won 3 national league titles and 5 international competitions, in what became the team's most successful era. He was a starter in Vélez 2–0 victory over AC Milan for the 1994 Intercontinental Cup.

The midfielder joined River Plate in 1998. He played there briefly, and was then loaned to Gimnasia y Esgrima La Plata, Al-Ittihad (Saudi Arabia) and Huracán. His contract with River expired in 2003, and he ended his career playing in Costa Rica for LD Alajuelense.

== International career ==
Gómez played one game with the Argentina national team, a 2–1 victory over Paraguay on June 14, 1995.

== Coaching career ==
In 2010, Gómez worked as a scout for Vélez Sársfield.

On 2 January 2019, Gómez was appointed as manager of Godoy Cruz. After only six games, which he only won one of, he was fired on 24 February 2019.

== Honours ==
Vélez Sársfield

- Argentine Primera División (3): 1993 Clausura, 1995 Apertura, 1996 Clausura
- Copa Libertadores (1): 1994
- Interncontinental Cup (1): 1994
- Supercopa Sudamericana (1): 1996
- Copa Interamericana (1): 1994
- Recopa Sudamericana (1): 1997

River Plate

- Argentine Primera División (1): 1999 Apertura

Al-Ittihad

- Saudi Premier League (1): 2000–01
- Saudi Crown Prince Cup (1): 2000–01

L. D. Alajuelense

- CONCACAF Champions' Cup (1): 2004
