= Martín Posse =

Argentine footballer (born 1975)

Personal information
- Full name: Martín Andrés Posse Paz
- Date of birth: 2 August 1975 (age 51)
- Place of birth: San Justo, Argentina
- Height: 1.70 m (5 ft 7 in)
- Position: Forward

Team information
- Current team: Kunisports (KL) (Manager)

Youth career
- Vélez Sarsfield

Senior career*
Years	Team	Apps	(Gls)
1992–1999	Vélez Sarsfield	98	(28)
1999–2006	Espanyol	152	(15)
2003–2004	→ Tenerife (loan)	33	(3)
2007	Figueres		
2007	Castelldefels	4	(0)
Total		287	(46)

International career
1997	Argentina	3	(0)

Managerial career
- 2010–2013: Espanyol (youth)
- 2013: Hospitalet
- 2014–2017: Pobla Mafumet
- 2017: Olot
- 2018–2019: Damm (youth)
- 2019: Santa Fe (assistant)
- 2023–: Kunisports (KL)
- * Club domestic league appearances and goals

Martín Andrés Posse Paz (born 2 August 1975) is an Argentine football manager and former player. He played mainly as a forward.

== Club career ==
Born in San Justo, Buenos Aires, Posse began his professional career with Club Atlético Vélez Sarsfield, being part of its successful teams in the mid-1990s and making over 100 appearances in all competitions. He helped the club to three top division titles and four international tournaments, including the 1994 Copa Libertadores.

Posse joined Spanish side RCD Espanyol in 1999, going on to become one of the club's most important offensive elements in the subsequent La Liga seasons, although never an undisputed starter. After a successful loan at CD Tenerife in the second level he returned to Catalonia, but only amassed 11 appearances in two campaigns combined.

== International career ==
In 1997, Posse was selected for the Argentina squad to play in that year's Copa América, going on to collect three caps.

== Coaching career ==
Posse retired in late 2007 at the age of 32, after brief spells in the Spanish lower leagues with UE Figueres and UE Castelldefels, both in the Barcelona area. As a manager, he worked with Espanyol's youths in several capacities, and had his first senior appointment with neighbouring CE L'Hospitalet, in division three. He resigned on 13 October.

On 29 June 2014 Posse was appointed at CF Pobla de Mafumet, Gimnàstic de Tarragona's farm team.

In July 2018, Posse was hired as a youth coach at CF Damm. He was there until 7 February 2019, where he was hired as the assistant manager of Patricio Camps at Independiente Santa Fe.

== Honours ==
Vélez Sarsfield

- Copa Libertadores: 1994
- Intercontinental Cup: 1994
- Argentine Primera División: Apertura 1995, Clausura 1996, Clausura 1998
- Copa Interamericana: 1995
- Supercopa Sudamericana: 1996
- Recopa Sudamericana: 1997

Espanyol

- Copa del Rey: 1999–2000, 2005–06
