= Rolando Chilavert =

Paraguayan footballer (born 1961)

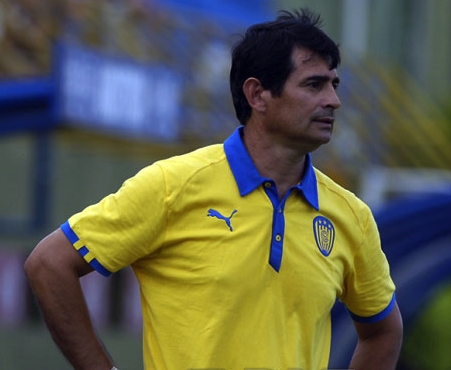

Personal information
- Full name: Rolando Marciano Chilavert González
- Date of birth: 22 May 1961 (age 65)
- Place of birth: Luque, Paraguay
- Height: 1.77 m (5 ft 10 in)
- Position: Midfielder

Senior career*
Years	Team	Apps	(Gls)
1982–1984	Sportivo Luqueño		
1984–1986	Guaraní		
1986–1988	Club Olimpia		
1990–1991	Chaco For Ever	24	(5)
1991	Cerro Porteño		
1992	Presidente Hayes		
1993–1994	Guaraní		

International career
1985–1986	Paraguay	10	(0)

Managerial career
- 1999: Guaraní
- 2004: Sol de América
- 2006: The Strongest
- 2010: Sportivo Luqueño
- 2011: Sportivo Luqueño
- 2012: 12 de Octubre
- 2013–2014: Ayacucho FC
- 2014–2015: León de Huánuco
- 2016: Sportivo Luqueño
- 2017: Sport Huancayo
- 2018: Comerciantes Unidos
- * Club domestic league appearances and goals

Rolando Marciano Chilavert González (born 22 May 1961) is a Paraguayan football manager and former player who played as a midfielder.

== Career ==
Chilavert was born in Luque. Throughout his career he played for several Paraguayan clubs such as Guaraní (where he was part of the 1984 team that won the Paraguayan Championship), Olimpia and Cerro Porteño, and for Argentine club Chaco For Ever. He was part of the Paraguay national team that competed in the 1986 FIFA World Cup. He played as an attacking midfielder and was known for his creativity and precision in the passes.

After retiring as a player, Chilavert started a coaching career that included teams such as Guaraní and Sol de América (from Paraguay), The Strongest (from Bolivia), and also the youth divisions of the Paraguay national team (Under-17 and Under-20).

== Personal life ==
Rolando is the older brother of former goalkeeper José Luis Chilavert.
