= Raúl Cardozo =

Argentine footballer

Personal information
- Full name: Raúl Ernesto Cardozo
- Date of birth: 28 October 1967 (age 59)
- Place of birth: Morón, Argentina
- Position: Defender

Senior career*
Years	Team	Apps	(Gls)
1986–1999	Vélez Sársfield	349	(9)
1999–2000	Newell's Old Boys	23	(0)
2000–2001	Chacarita Juniors	28	(0)
2001	Nacional	39	(1)
2002	Olimpia	0	(0)
2002–2003	Villa Dálmine	23	(0)
Total		462	(10)

International career
1997	Argentina	4	(0)

Managerial career
- 2012: Godoy Cruz (assistant)
- 2016–2017: Sportivo Estudiantes (assistant)
- 2019: Almirante Brown
- * Club domestic league appearances and goals

Raúl Ernesto Cardozo (born 28 October 1967) is a former Argentine football defender who is one of the most important players in the history of Vélez Sársfield.

== Career ==
Cardozo, nicknamed Pacha was born in Morón and started his playing career with Vélez Sársfield during the 1986–87 season. He went on to play over 350 games for the club. He played during the golden era of the club in the mid-1990s when they won 9 major titles.

Cardozo helped Velez to win their first league title in 25 years when they claimed the Clausura 1993 championship. The following season they won the Copa Libertadores and the Copa Intercontinental.

Velez won both league titles during the 1995–96 season.

In 1997 Cardozo was called up to join the Argentina squad to play in the 1997 Copa América.

His last major title with Velez was the Clausura 1998 championship.

In 1999 Cardozo left Velez, he played for a number of different teams: Newell's Old Boys and Chacarita Juniors in the Argentine Primera, Nacional in Uruguay, where he won a league title, Olimpia in Paraguay and finally Villa Dálmine in the lower leagues of Argentine football.

== Coaching career ==
Cardozo had been the assistant manager of Omar Asad at Godoy Cruz and Sportivo Estudiantes. In March 2019, he was appointed manager of Club Almirante Brown. He left the club again at the end of June 2019.

== Honours ==
=== Club ===
Vélez Sársfield

- Torneo Apertura: 1995
- Torneo Clausura: 1993, 1996, 1998
- Copa Libertadores: 1994
- Intercontinental Cup: 1994
- Copa Interamericana: 1994
- Supercopa Sudamericana: 1996
- Recopa Sudamericana: 1997

Nacional

- Primera División Uruguaya: 2001

Villa Dálmine

- Primera C Metropolitana Apertura: 2002
