= 2003 Campeonato Uruguayo Primera División =

100th season of the top-tier football league in Uruguay

Statistics of Primera División Uruguaya for the 2003 season.

== Overview ==
It was contested by 18 teams, and Peñarol won the championship.

== Apertura ==
Pos	Team	Pld	W	D	L	GF	GA	GD	Pts
1	Nacional	17	14	2	1	34	9	+25	44
2	Peñarol	17	12	2	3	43	20	+23	38
3	Danubio	17	10	4	3	34	19	+15	34
4	Montevideo Wanderers	17	10	3	4	40	28	+12	33
5	Fénix	17	9	2	6	41	38	+3	29
6	Cerro	17	8	4	5	25	21	+4	28
7	Deportivo Maldonado	17	8	4	5	24	26	−2	28
8	Defensor Sporting	17	8	3	6	28	23	+5	27
9	Liverpool	17	8	3	6	24	24	0	27
10	Miramar Misiones	17	6	4	7	28	27	+1	22
11	Bella Vista	17	6	3	8	23	22	+1	21
12	Central Español	17	6	3	8	15	22	−7	21
13	Tacuarembó	17	5	5	7	25	26	−1	20
14	Villa Española	17	4	5	8	31	37	−6	17
15	River Plate	17	3	4	10	18	27	−9	13
16	Plaza Colonia	17	2	6	9	17	26	−9	12
17	Deportivo Colonia	17	2	3	12	13	36	−23	9
18	Juventud Las Piedras	17	1	2	14	11	43	−32	5

Source: rsssf.com

== Clausura ==
Pos	Team	Pld	W	D	L	GF	GA	GD	Pts
1	Peñarol	17	12	3	2	30	13	+17	39
2	Liverpool	17	9	4	4	23	15	+8	31
3	Fénix	17	8	5	4	21	16	+5	29
4	Defensor Sporting	17	8	4	5	30	20	+10	28
5	Miramar Misiones	17	8	4	5	26	21	+5	28
6	Cerro	17	7	6	4	22	17	+5	27
7	River Plate	17	8	3	6	26	25	+1	27
8	Danubio	17	7	6	4	21	21	0	27
9	Nacional	17	7	5	5	29	23	+6	26
10	Bella Vista	17	7	5	5	23	22	+1	26
11	Deportivo Maldonado	17	6	5	6	16	14	+2	23
12	Deportivo Colonia	17	6	5	6	24	23	+1	23
13	Central Español	17	7	1	9	17	20	−3	22
14	Montevideo Wanderers	17	4	7	6	19	24	−5	19
15	Tacuarembó	17	4	5	8	19	23	−4	17
16	Plaza Colonia	17	2	5	10	16	30	−14	11
17	Villa Española	17	1	5	11	14	29	−15	8
18	Juventud Las Piedras	17	2	2	13	17	37	−20	8

Source: rsssf.com

== Overall ==
Pos	Team	Pld	W	D	L	GF	GA	GD	Pts
1	Peñarol	34	24	5	5	73	33	+40	77
2	Nacional	34	21	7	6	63	32	+31	70
3	Danubio	34	17	10	7	55	40	+15	61
4	Fénix	34	17	7	10	62	54	+8	58
5	Liverpool	34	17	7	10	47	39	+8	58
6	Defensor Sporting	34	16	7	11	58	43	+15	55
7	Cerro	34	15	10	9	47	38	+9	55
8	Montevideo Wanderers	34	14	10	10	59	52	+7	52
9	Deportivo Maldonado	34	14	9	11	40	40	0	51
10	Miramar Misiones	34	14	8	12	54	48	+6	50
11	Bella Vista	34	13	8	13	46	44	+2	47
12	Central Español	34	13	4	17	32	42	−10	43
13	River Plate	34	11	7	16	44	52	−8	40
14	Tacuarembó	34	9	10	15	44	49	−5	37
15	Deportivo Colonia	34	8	8	18	37	59	−22	32
16	Villa Española	34	5	10	19	45	66	−21	25
17	Plaza Colonia	34	4	11	19	33	56	−23	23
18	Juventud Las Piedras	34	3	4	27	28	80	−52	13

Source: rsssf.com

== Playoff ==
- Peñarol 1-0 Nacional

Peñarol won the championship.
