= Flavio Zandoná =

Argentine footballer (born 1967)

Personal information
- Full name: Flavio Gabriel Zandoná
- Date of birth: April 8, 1967 (age 59)
- Place of birth: Zárate, Argentina
- Height: 1.84 m (6 ft 0 in)
- Position: Right back

Youth career
- Belgrano de Zárate
- San Lorenzo

Senior career*
Years	Team	Apps	(Gls)
1990–1994	San Lorenzo	116	(11)
1994–2000	Vélez Sársfield	142	(9)
1998	→ CD Veracruz (loan)	?	(?)
2000	Avispa Fukuoka	0	(0)
2000	Cerro Porteño	?	(?)
- * Club domestic league appearances and goals

Flavio Gabriel Zandoná (born April 8, 1967), nicknamed El Chino (lit. 'Chinese'), is a former Argentine footballer who played most of his career for Vélez Sársfield of the Argentine Primera, winning 8 honours with the club. He was born in Zárate, Buenos Aires Province.

== Playing career ==
Zandoná started playing for San Lorenzo in 1994 as a centre back. He later transferred to Vélez Sársfield where he was almost exclusively used as a right back. Zandoná won 8 titles with Vélez, including the 1994 Copa Libertadores and Intercontinental Cup.

Zandoná was known for his aggressive style on and off the field. Playing with Vélez in the 1995 Supercopa Sudamericana he punched Flamengo's striker Edmundo after a short slap exchange. Soon after, Romário threw him a flying kick. Later, in 1998, he punched a rival fan who had insulted him after seeing the red card in Vélez' game against Racing.

== Honours ==
Vélez Sársfield

- Primera División Argentina (3): 1995 Apertura, 1996 Clausura, 1998 Clausura
- Copa Libertadores (1): 1994
- Intercontinental Cup (1): 1994
- Copa Interamericana (1): 1994
- Supercopa Sudamericana (1): 1996
- Recopa Sudamericana (1): 1997
