= Hernán Maisterra =

Argentine footballer and manager

Personal information
- Full name: Hernán Martín Maisterra
- Date of birth: 30 June 1972 (age 54)
- Place of birth: Buenos Aires, Argentina
- Height: 1.79 m (5 ft 10 in)
- Position: Midfielder

Senior career*
Years	Team	Apps	(Gls)
1993–1996	Platense	83	(4)
1995	León (loan)	12	(0)
1997–1998	River Plate	10	(0)
1999–2001	Platense	42	(3)
2001	The Strongest	5	(1)
2003	Los Andes	12	(1)
2004–2005	Godoy Cruz	51	(2)

Managerial career
- 2008–: C.A.I.
- * Club domestic league appearances and goals as of November 28, 2005

Hernán Martín Maisterra (born 30 June 1972, in Buenos Aires) is a retired Argentine footballer who played for a number of clubs in Argentina and other Latin American countries, including Club Atlético Platense, Club Atlético River Plate and Club León. He currently works as the manager of Comisión de Actividades Infantiles in the Argentine 2nd division.
