= Mauricio Pellegrino =

Argentine football player and manager

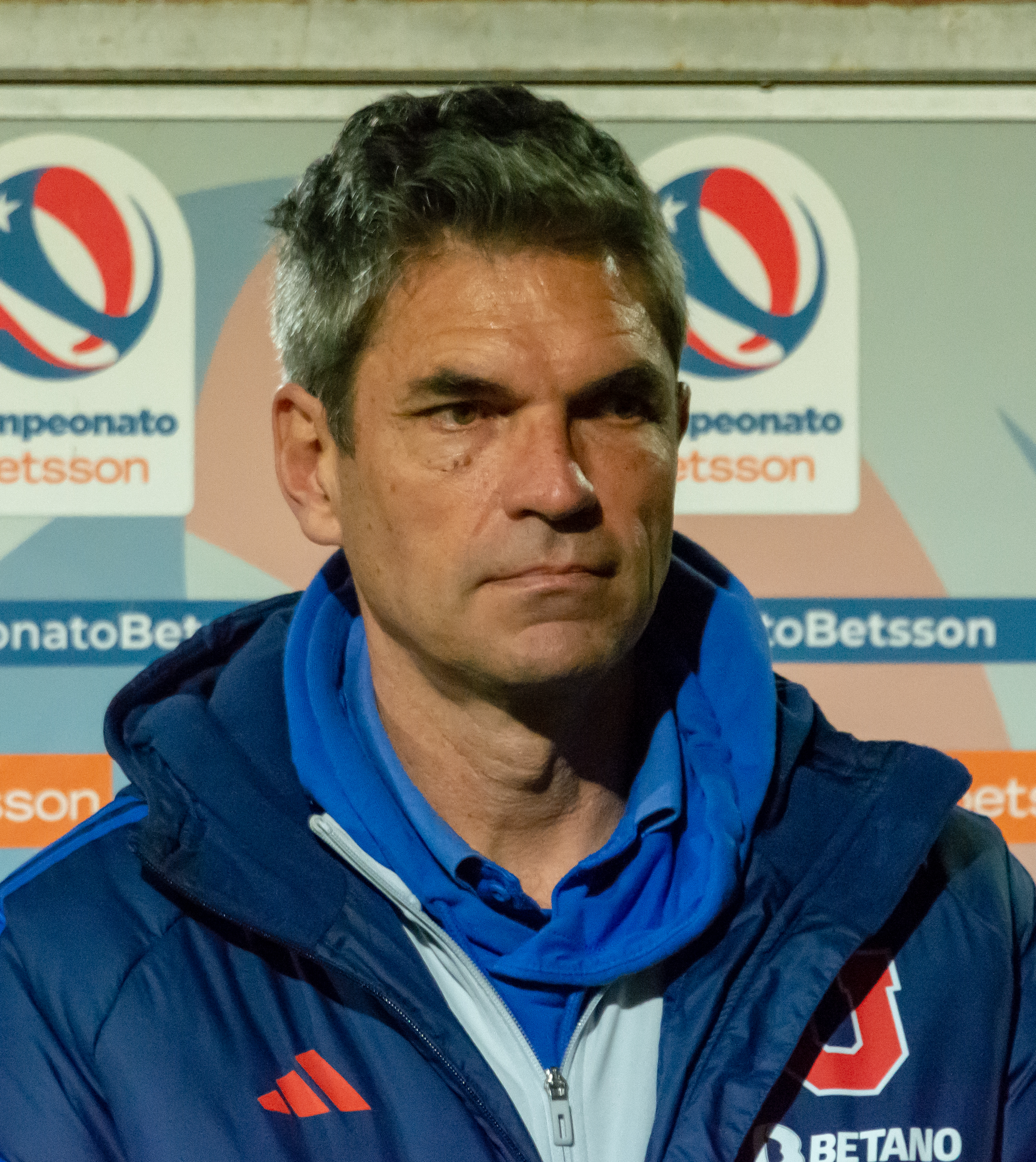
- Pellegrino with Universidad de Chile in 2023

Personal information
- Full name: Mauricio Andrés Pellegrino Luna
- Date of birth: 5 October 1971 (age 55)
- Place of birth: Leones, Argentina
- Height: 1.93 m (6 ft 4 in)
- Position: Centre-back

Team information
- Current team: Lanús (manager)

Youth career
- 1982–1987: CA Sarmiento
- 1987–1990: Vélez Sarsfield

Senior career*
Years	Team	Apps	(Gls)
1990–1999	Vélez Sarsfield	186	(11)
1998–1999	→ Barcelona (loan)	23	(0)
1999–2005	Valencia	140	(5)
2005	Liverpool	12	(0)
2005–2006	Alavés	13	(0)
Total		374	(16)

International career
1991	Argentina U20	2	(0)
1997	Argentina	3	(0)

Managerial career
- 2012: Valencia
- 2013–2015: Estudiantes
- 2015–2016: Independiente
- 2016–2017: Alavés
- 2017–2018: Southampton
- 2018–2019: Leganés
- 2020–2022: Vélez Sarsfield
- 2023: Universidad de Chile
- 2024: Cádiz
- 2025–: Lanús
- * Club domestic league appearances and goals

Mauricio Andrés Pellegrino Luna (Latin American Spanish: [mawˈɾisjo peleˈɣɾino]; born 5 October 1971) is an Argentine former professional footballer who played as a centre-back. He is currently manager of Lanús.

After nearly one decade with Vélez Sarsfield, he spent the vast majority of his remaining career in Spain, amassing La Liga totals of 176 games and five goals over the course of eight seasons for three clubs, notably Valencia with which he won three titles (he won nine while in Argentina). He also had a six-month stint with Liverpool, and appeared with Argentina at the 1997 Copa América.

Pellegrino embarked on a managerial career after retiring, working for two years with Vélez Sarsfield and leading Alavés to the 2017 Copa del Rey final. For eight months, he was in charge of Southampton in the Premier League.

== Club career ==
=== Vélez and Barcelona ===
Born in Leones, Córdoba, Pellegrino played for Vélez Sarsfield for much of the 1990s, as the Buenos Aires-based club experienced its golden age, winning four Primeira División championships and the 1994 Intercontinental Cup and Copa Libertadores. He received the nickname El Flaco ("The Lanky One") for his physique.

Pellegrino had his first experience abroad in 1998–99, joining Louis van Gaal's Barcelona on loan. He made his La Liga debut on 12 September 1998 in a 1–0 home win against Extremadura, and would be used regularly during the campaign, which ended with league conquest.

=== Valencia ===
Pellegrino had his best years with another Spanish side, Valencia, partnering countryman Roberto Ayala in the heart of the back-four while helping them to two league titles during his tenure, with the addition of the 2003–04 edition of the UEFA Cup. Possessing an Italian passport through descent, he did not take a slot for non-European Union players in the team.

Arguably Pellegrino's worst moment occurred during the 2001 UEFA Champions League final as he missed the last penalty shootout attempt against Bayern Munich (1–1 after 120 minutes); he also took part in the previous season's decisive match, which also ended in defeat, to Real Madrid (3–0). Overall though, in his six years at the Mestalla, he was a very important defensive unit, and made 213 official appearances for the Che.

=== Liverpool and retirement ===
In early January 2005, after having been frozen out by Claudio Ranieri, Pellegrino joined former Valencia boss Rafael Benítez at Liverpool on a free transfer, signing a six-month contract– this move made him the first Argentine player in the history of the club. He played 12 times for the Reds in the Premier League – 13 overall – but his performances were not enough to secure a longer contract, and he was released by the club at the end of the season. He was cup-tied for their campaign in the UEFA Champions League, and did not feature in the victory over AC Milan in the final of the competition.

Afterwards, Pellegrino returned to Spain, having an unassuming stint with Alavés (fewer than half of the matches played, top-division relegation).

== International career ==
Pellegrino earned three caps for Argentina, all in 1997. He was picked for the squad at that year's Copa América and made his debut in the continental tournament against Ecuador in the group stage.

== Coaching career ==
=== Early years ===
After retiring in June 2006, Pellegrino stayed connected to Valencia, coaching its Cadete B (youth team). Two years later, he returned to Liverpool, who still had Benítez in charge, as first-team coach. In the middle of 2010 the pair moved to Inter Milan, where they were dismissed in December.

=== Valencia ===
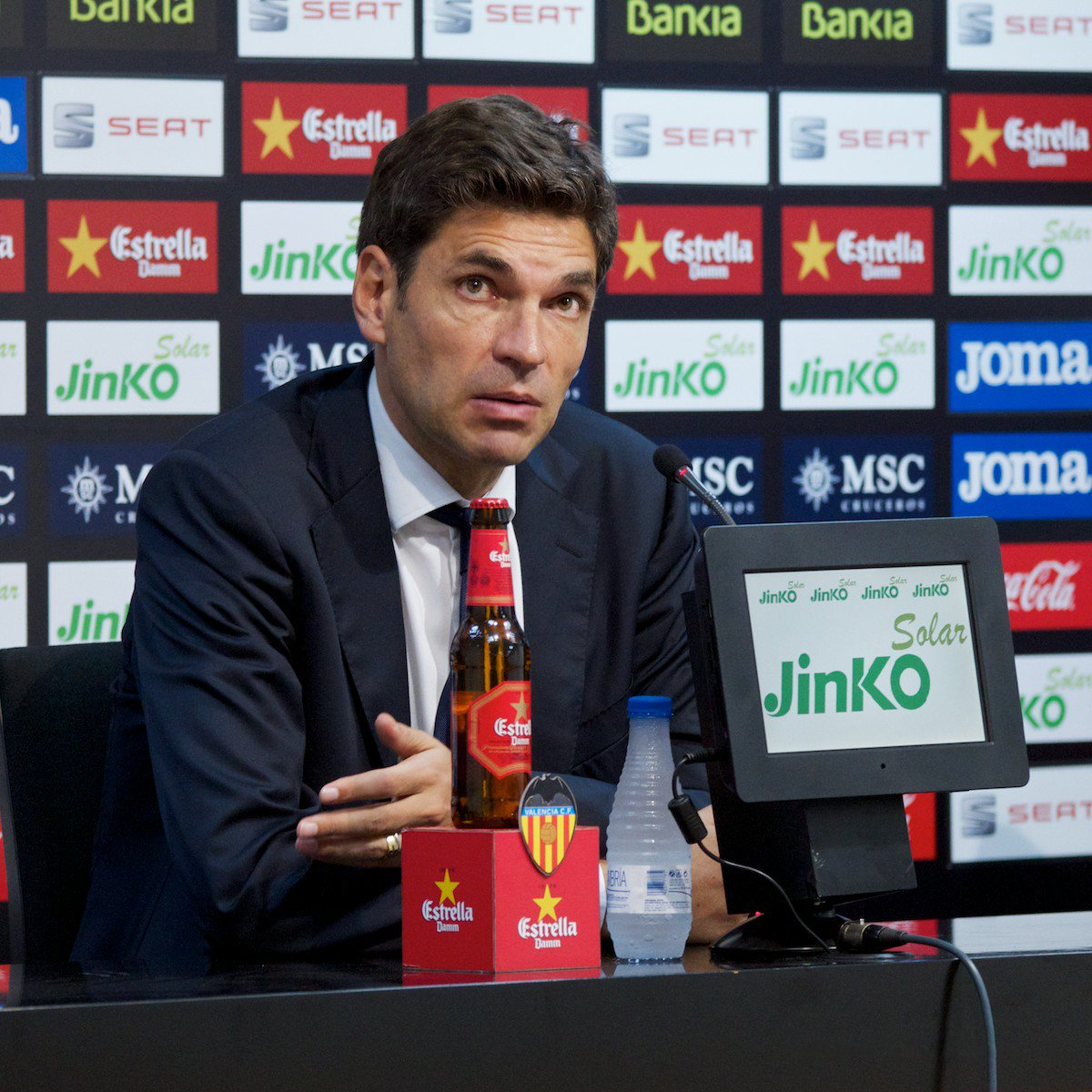
Pellegrino as manager of Valencia

On 7 May 2012, Pellegrino joined Valencia, signing for two years as a replacement for Unai Emery who had left at the end of the season. The first game of his career was a 1–1 draw at Real Madrid on 19 August. On 1 December 2012, following a 2–5 home loss against Real Sociedad which left the side in 12th place, he was relieved of his duties.

=== Estudiantes and Independiente ===
Pellegrino returned to his country, signing with Estudiantes in April 2013. On 14 April 2015, he was sacked by president Juan Sebastián Verón.

In June 2015, Pellegrino was appointed at Independiente in the same league.

=== Alavés ===
Pellegrino returned to Alavés on 26 June 2016, being named José Bordalás's successor as the club had just been promoted to the top flight. In his first season he qualified the team for the final of the Copa del Rey for the first time ever, after a 1–0 aggregate defeat of Celta; in the decisive match, played in Madrid, they lost 3–1 to Barcelona.

=== Southampton and Leganés ===
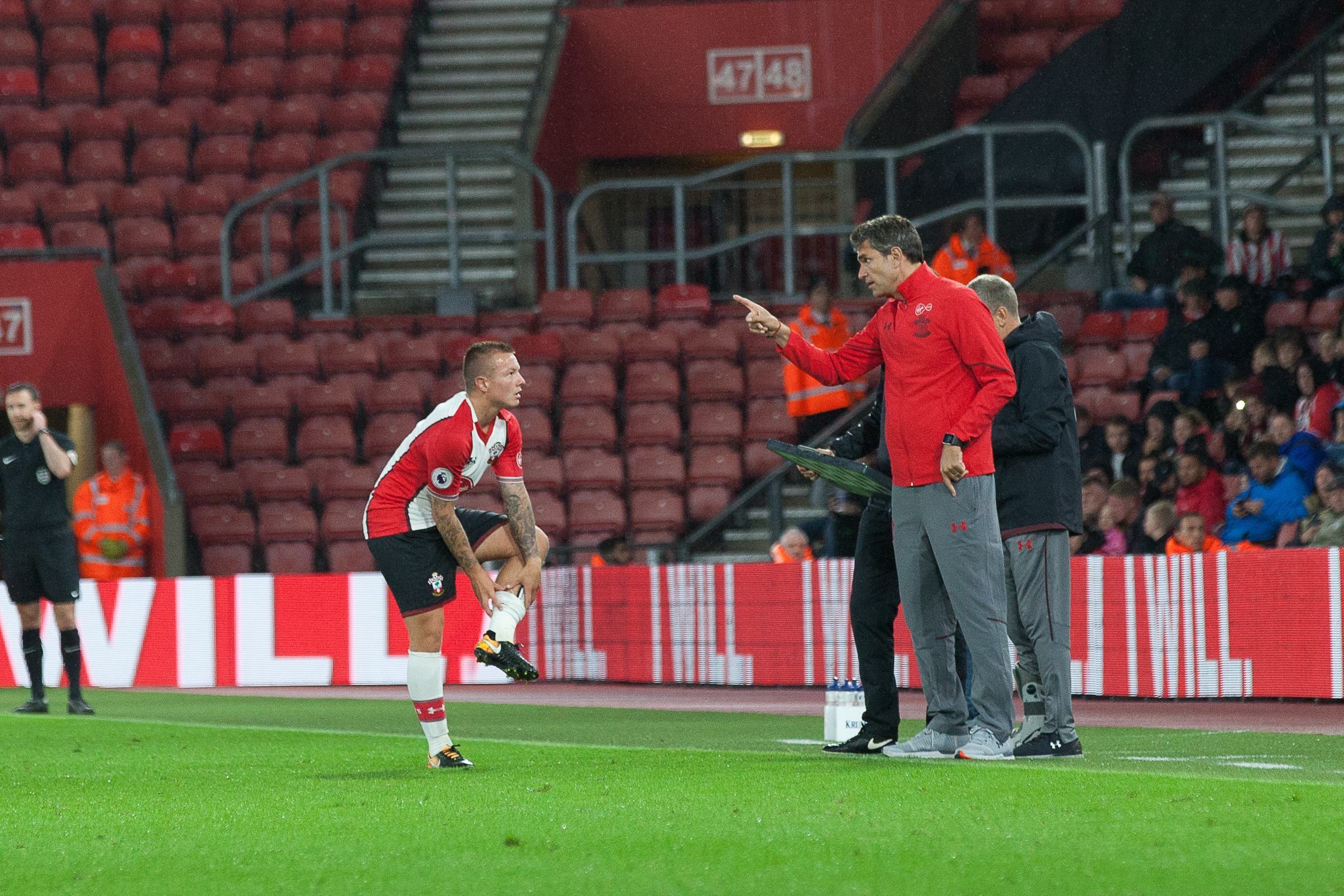
Pellegrino as Southampton manager in 2017

On 23 June 2017, Pellegrino was appointed coach of Southampton on a three-year contract. He was dismissed the following 12 March, with the team at risk of relegation after winning one of their last 17 matches.

Pellegrino returned to the Spanish top tier on 2 June 2018, signing a one-year deal with Leganés. In his first season, he led the club to a best-ever 13th place with record points, subsequently earning an extension until 2021. In October 2019, as the side was last in the standings, he left by mutual consent.

=== Vélez Sarsfield ===
On 16 April 2020, Pellegrino replaced Gabriel Heinze at the helm of Vélez Sarsfield and agreed to a contract until June 2021. At its conclusion, it was extended for another twelve months.

Pellegrino's side reached the semi-finals of the Copa Sudamericana in his first year, being eliminated 4–0 on aggregate by compatriots Lanús. Domestically, they were runners-up to River Plate in the 2021 season; holding a 56% winning percentage over his entire spell, he resigned on 23 March 2022 after a poor start to the Copa de la Liga Profesional.

=== Universidad de Chile ===
On 29 November 2022, Pellegrino was appointed as manager of Club Universidad de Chile for the upcoming season. He left after finishing ninth, two points off qualification for continental tournaments.

=== Cádiz ===
On 24 January 2024, Pellegrino returned to Spain and its top tier, signing for Cádiz. On 28 May, not having been able to avoid relegation as third-bottom, he left.

=== Lanús ===
On 14 December 2024, Pellegrino became the new head coach of Lanús. On 22 November 2025, he led the club to its second victory in the Sudamericana after beating Brazil's Atlético Mineiro on penalties.

== Personal life ==
Pellegrino's son and brother, Mateo and Maximiliano, were also footballers. The former made his professional debut for Vélez under his management.

== Managerial statistics ==
As of match played 8 November 2026

Managerial record by team and tenure
Team	From	To	Record								Ref.
Team	From	To	G	W	D	L	GF	GA	GD	Win %	Ref.
Valencia	4 June 2012	1 December 2012	21	10	4	7	34	29	+5	47.62	
Estudiantes	5 April 2013	14 April 2015	98	40	31	27	102	83	+19	40.82	
Independiente	4 June 2015	10 May 2016	41	21	13	7	55	29	+26	51.22	
Alavés	26 June 2016	29 May 2017	47	18	17	12	54	49	+5	38.30	
Southampton	23 June 2017	12 March 2018	35	9	13	13	35	47	−12	25.71	
Leganés	2 June 2018	21 October 2019	51	13	15	23	45	64	−19	25.49	
Vélez Sarsfield	17 April 2020	23 March 2022	78	37	21	20	114	76	+38	47.44	
Universidad de Chile	29 November 2022	9 December 2023	32	12	8	12	50	42	+8	37.50	
Cádiz	24 January 2024	28 May 2024	17	4	6	7	11	24	−13	23.53	
Lanús	14 December 2024	present	96	42	29	25	107	79	+28	43.75	
Career total			516	206	157	153	607	521	+86	39.92	

== Honours ==
=== Player ===
Vélez Sarsfield

- Argentine Primera División: 1993 Clausura, 1995 Apertura, 1996 Clausura, 1998 Clausura
- Copa Libertadores: 1994
- Intercontinental Cup: 1994
- Supercopa Sudamericana: 1996
- Copa Interamericana: 1994
- Recopa Sudamericana: 1997

Barcelona

- La Liga: 1998–99

Valencia

- La Liga: 2001–02, 2003–04
- UEFA Cup: 2003–04
- UEFA Champions League runner-up: 1999–2000, 2000–01

Liverpool

- Football League Cup runner-up: 2004–05

=== Manager ===
Alavés

- Copa del Rey runner-up: 2016–17

Lanús

- Copa Sudamericana: 2025
- Recopa Sudamericana: 2026
