= José Torres Cadena =

Colombian football referee (born 1952)

José Joaquín Torres Cadena
- Full name: José Joaquín Torres Cadena
- Born: 15 July 1952 (age 74); Colombia

Domestic
Years	League	Role

International
Years	League	Role
1989–1994	FIFA listed	Referee

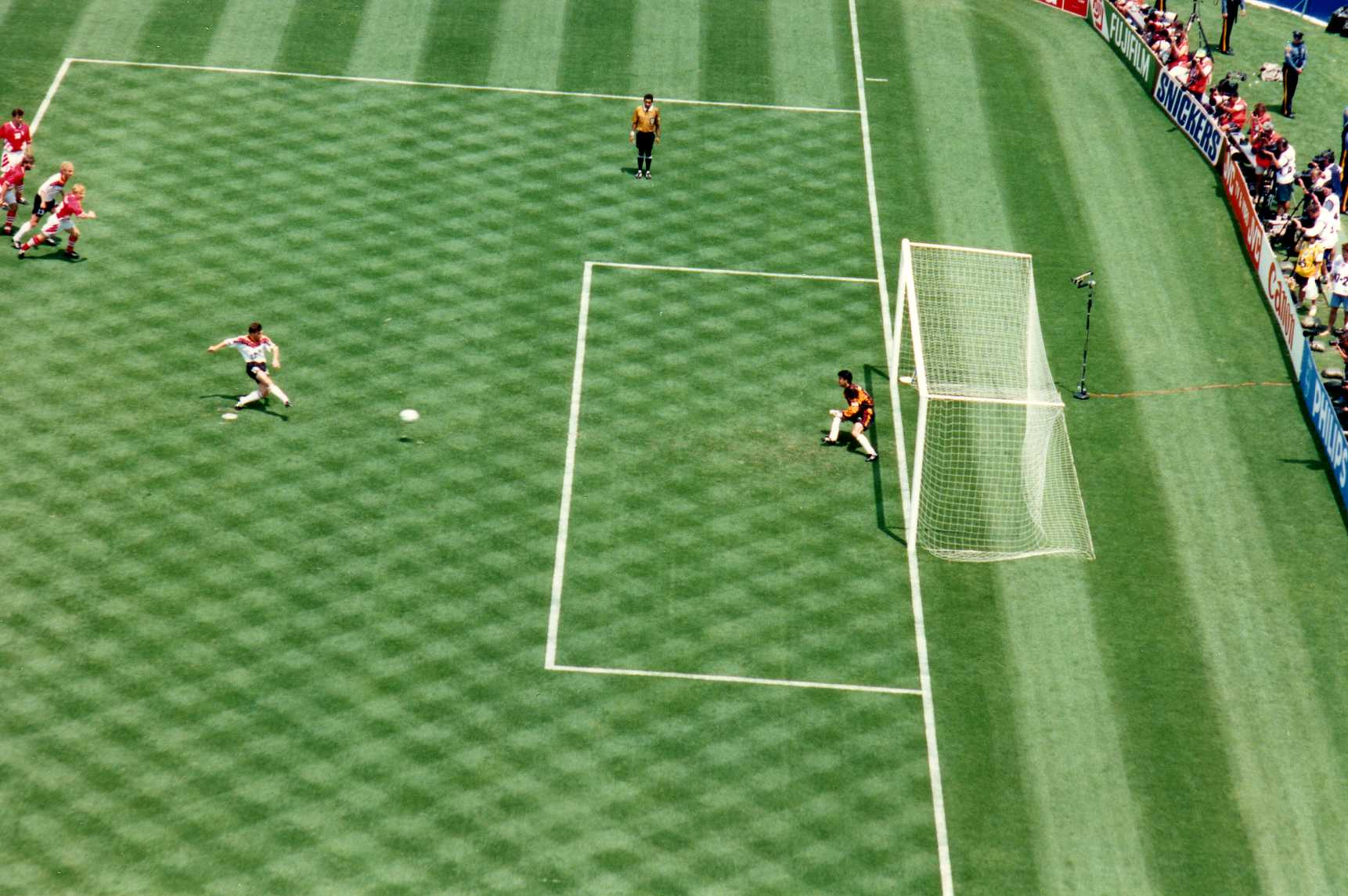
Lothar Matthäus taking a penalty in the quarter-final match against Bulgaria at the 1994 FIFA World Cup. The match was refereed by Torres, who is seen overviewing the penalty.

José Joaquín Torres Cadena (born July 15, 1952), also known as J.J. Torres, is a former association football referee from Colombia.

Torres served as a FIFA referee for several international tournaments, including the 1989 FIFA World Youth Championship and the 1992 Summer Olympics. He also worked as a referee for the 1994 World Cup's South American qualifiers.

Torres is mostly known for supervising four matches in the 1994 FIFA World Cup in the United States. He officiated two group stage matches: the first one between Belgium and Morocco and the second one between the Republic of Ireland and Norway, as well as the quarter-final match between Germany and Bulgaria and the semi-final match between Brazil and Sweden.

Sporting positions (Colombia) José Torres Cadena
Preceded by (France) Gérard Biguet	1992 FIFA Men's Olympic Football Tournament Final Referee	Succeeded by (Italy) Pierluigi Collina
