= Roberto Trotta =

Argentine footballer and manager

Personal information
- Full name: Roberto Luis Trotta
- Date of birth: January 28, 1969 (age 57)
- Place of birth: Pigüé, Argentina
- Height: 1.86 m (6 ft 1 in)
- Position: Defender

Senior career*
| Years | Team | Apps | (Gls) |
| 1987–1991 | Estudiantes | 135 | (18) |
| 1992–1996 | Vélez Sársfield | 128 | (27) |
| 1996 | Roma | 6 | (0) |
| 1997 | River Plate | 11 | (1) |
| 1997 | Racing Club | 7 | (1) |
| 1998 | Sporting Gijón | 18 | (0) |
| 1998–1999 | Unión | 35 | (2) |
| 1999–2001 | River Plate | 48 | (6) |
| 2001–2002 | Atlante | 42 | (2) |
| 2002–2003 | Puebla | 31 | (3) |
| 2003 | Estudiantes | 14 | (0) |
| 2004 | Barcelona Sporting Club | 4 | (0) |
| 2004–2005 | Unión | 19 | (6) |

International career
| 1995 | Argentina | 3 | (0) |

Managerial career
- 2006–2007: Independiente Rivadavia
- 2007: Almagro
- 2007–2008: Independiente Rivadavia
- * Club domestic league appearances and goals as of May 2007

Roberto Trotta (born 28 January 1969 in Pigüé) is an Argentine football manager and former defender.

Trotta played club football in Argentina, Spain, Italy, Mexico and Ecuador. During his time in the Argentine Primera he set the record for the highest number of red cards ever with 17.

Trotta was a member of several championship winning teams, the highlight of his career was helping Vélez Sársfield to win the 1994 Copa Libertadores.

Trotta has worked as a manager, including a spell as manager of Almagro in 2007.

== Honours ==
Vélez Sársfield

- Torneo Apertura: 1995
- Torneo Clausura: 1993
- Copa Libertadores: 1994
- Intercontinental Cup: 1994
- Copa Interamericana: 1994

River Plate

- Torneo Apertura: 1999
- Torneo Clausura: 2000
