= Patricio Camps =

Argentine footballer

Personal information
- Full name: Patricio Alejandro Camps
- Date of birth: January 22, 1972 (age 54)
- Place of birth: Buenos Aires, Argentina
- Height: 1.76 m (5 ft 9 in)
- Positions: Attacking midfielder; striker

Youth career
- 1986–1991: Velez Sarsfield

Senior career*
Years	Team	Apps	(Gls)
1991–1994	Velez Sarsfield	36	(7)
1994–1995	Banfield	29	(4)
1995–2000	Velez Sarsfield	165	(63)
2000	PAOK	9	(2)
2001–2002	Velez Sarsfield	7	(0)
2002–2003	Tecos UAG	33	(5)
2003–2004	Quilmes	15	(0)
2004	Olimpia	11	(3)

International career
1992–1998	Argentina	2	(0)

Managerial career
- 2019: Santa Fe
- * Club domestic league appearances and goals

Patricio Alejandro Camps (born January 22, 1972, in Buenos Aires) is a former Argentine football player. He is of Ukrainian descent.

== Club career ==
Camps joined Velez as a 14 years old in 1986, he made his breakthrough into the first team in 1991. He was part of four Argentine league championship campaigns and also won three international championships.

Camps also played for Banfield and Quilmes in Argentina, PAOK Thessaloniki FC in Greece, Tecos UAG in Mexico and Olimpia of Paraguay.

He played over 250 times for Velez Sarsfield in all competitions, winning seven major titles during the club's golden era in the 1990s.

== Coaching career ==
After retiring, Camps joined the technical staff of José Pékerman at the Argentina national football team. The duo was there from 2004 to 2006. He followed Pékerman to Deportivo Toluca in July 2007 still as a part of his technical staff, until the next year. Camps continued alongside Pékerman to Tigres UANL in February 2008, but left already at the end of the season just four months later. In January 2012, Camps once again joined the technical staff of José Pékerman at the Colombia national football team.

With 12 years of experience as part of a technical team, Camps got his first ever manager job on 12 April 2019, when he was appointed as the manager of Santa Fe with Martín Posse as his assistant.

== Titles ==
Season	Team	Title
Clausura 1993	Velez Sarsfield	Argentine Primera
Apertura 1995	Velez Sarsfield	Argentine Primera
1995	Velez Sarsfield	Copa Interamericana
Clausura 1996	Velez Sarsfield	Argentine Primera
1996	Velez Sarsfield	Supercopa Sudamericana
1997	Velez Sarsfield	Recopa Sudamericana
Clausura 1998	Velez Sarsfield	Argentine Primera
