= 1994 Intercontinental Cup =

- Match programme cover
Milan	Vélez Sársfield
(Italy)	(Argentina)
0	2
- Date: 1 December 1994
- Venue: National Stadium, Tokyo
- Man of the Match: Omar Asad (Vélez Sarsfield)
- Referee: José Torres Cadena (Colombia)
- Attendance: 47,886

The 1994 Intercontinental Cup was an association football match played on 1 December 1994, between Milan, winners of the 1993–94 UEFA Champions League, and Vélez Sársfield, winners of the 1994 Copa Libertadores. The match was played at the National Stadium in Tokyo. It was Milan's sixth appearance into the competition, after the victories in 1969, 1989, 1990 and the defeats in 1963 and 1993, whereas it was Vélez Sársfield's first appearance.

Omar Asad was named as man of the match.

== Venue ==
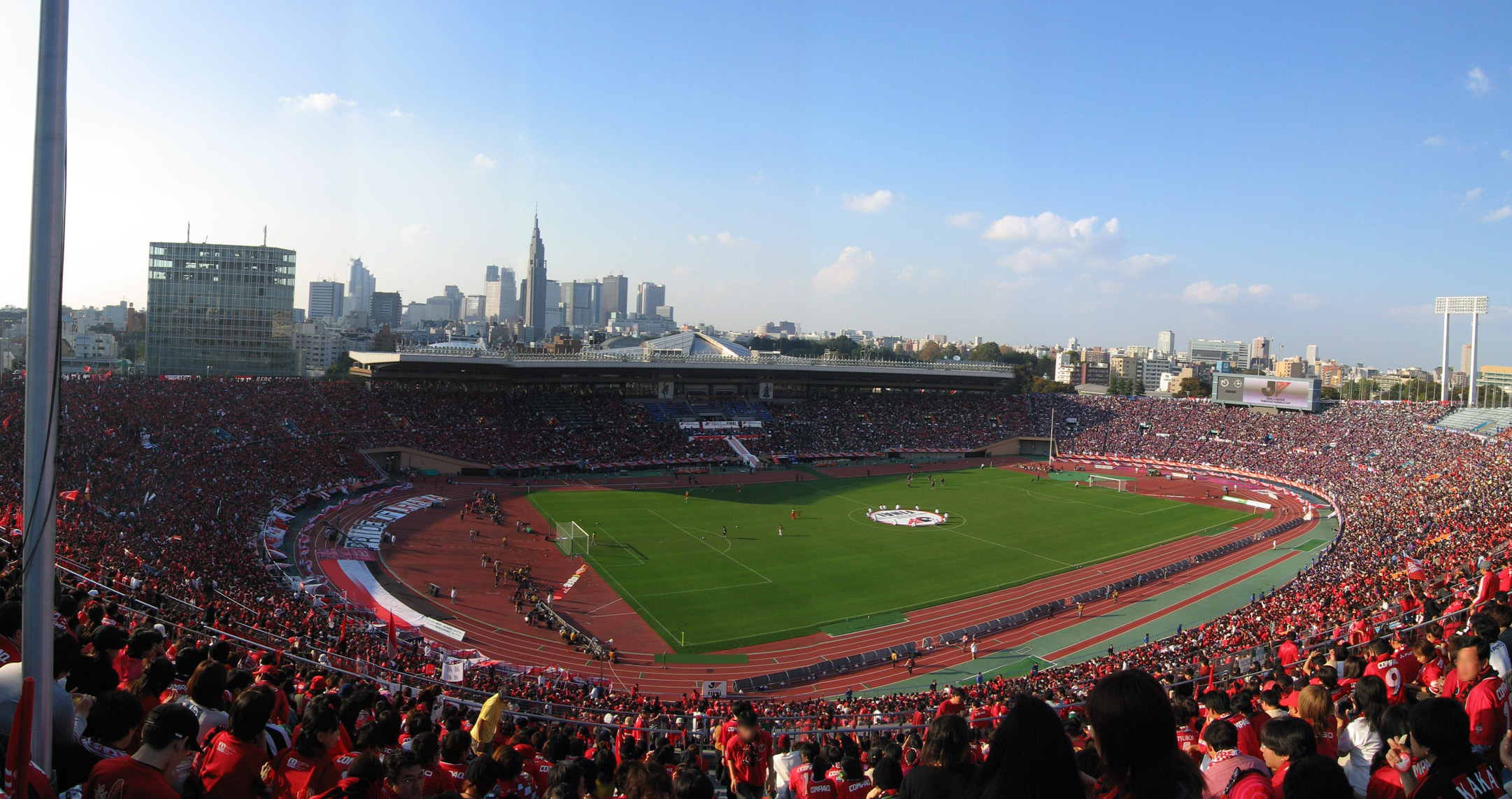
The National Stadium in Tokyo hosted the match

== Match details ==
1 December 1994
19:15 UTC+09:00

Milan (Italy)	0–2	(Argentina) Vélez Sarsfield
	Report	Trotta 50' (pen.); Asad 57'

National Stadium, Tokyo
Attendance: 47,886
Referee: José Torres Cadena (Colombia)

Milan	Vélez Sarsfield

GK	1	(Italy) Sebastiano Rossi
RB	2	(Italy) Mauro Tassotti
CB	6	(Italy) Franco Baresi (c)
CB	4	(Italy) Alessandro Costacurta	(red card) 85'
LB	3	(Italy) Paolo Maldini
RM	9	(Croatia) Zvonimir Boban		(substituted off) 55'
CM	5	(Italy) Demetrio Albertini	(yellow card) 44'
CM	8	(France) Marcel Desailly
LM	7	(Italy) Roberto Donadoni
CF	10	(Federal Republic of Yugoslavia) Dejan Savićević	(yellow card) 27'	(substituted off) 86'
CF	11	(Italy) Daniele Massaro
Substitutes:
GK	12	(Italy) Mario Ielpo
DF	13	(Italy) Filippo Galli
DF	14	(Italy) Christian Panucci		(substituted on) 86'
FW	15	(Italy) Paolo Di Canio
FW	16	(Italy) Marco Simone	(yellow card) 84'	(substituted on) 55'
Manager:
(Italy) Fabio Capello

GK	1	(Paraguay) José Luis Chilavert
DF	4	(Argentina) Héctor Almandoz	(yellow card) 2'
DF	2	(Argentina) Roberto Trotta (c)	(yellow card) 70'
DF	6	(Argentina) Víctor Sotomayor
DF	3	(Argentina) Raúl Cardozo
MF	8	(Argentina) José Basualdo
MF	5	(Argentina) Marcelo Gómez	(yellow card) 17'
MF	10	(Argentina) Roberto Pompei
MF	7	(Argentina) Christian Bassedas
FW	9	(Argentina) Omar Asad	(yellow card) 79'
FW	11	(Argentina) José Oscar Flores
Substitutes:
GK	12	(Argentina) Sandro Guzmán
DF	13	(Argentina) Flavio Zandoná
DF	14	(Argentina) Mauricio Pellegrino
MF	15	(Argentina) Marcelo Herrera
FW	16	(Chile) José Luis Sánchez
Manager:
(Argentina) Carlos Bianchi

Man of the Match:
(Argentina) Omar Asad (Vélez Sársfield)

Match Ball

- The Ball of the match was the Adidas Questra, originally designed to be the official match ball of the 1994 FIFA World Cup in the United States.

== See also ==
- 1993–94 UEFA Champions League
- 1994 Copa Libertadores
- A.C. Milan in European football
