= 1994 Copa Libertadores =

35th season of Copa Libertadores

1994 Copa Libertadores de América
Libertadores 1994

Tournament details
- Dates: February 13 – August 31
- Teams: 21 (from 10 associations)

Final positions
- Champions: (Argentina) Vélez Sársfield (1st title)
- Runners-up: (Brazil) São Paulo

Tournament statistics
- Matches played: 90
- Goals scored: 205 (2.28 per match)
- Top scorer: (Venezuela) Stalin Rivas (7 Goals)

The 1994 Copa Libertadores was the 35th edition of the Copa Libertadores, CONMEBOL's premier annual international competition. Vélez Sársfield won the tournament for their first title against São Paulo in a penalty shootout with a score of 5–3. Vélez's goalkeeper José Chilavert scored one of the penalty kicks and saved another one. The top scorer of the tournament was Stalin Rivas of Minervén S.C., with 7 goals.

This was the first time since 1986 that an Argentine club won the Libertadores again after a negative streak of 7 years. This bad streak would repeat from the 2019 edition until 2025 edition.

== First Phase ==
Legend: Pts: Points; P: Played games; W: Won games; D: Drawn games; L: Lost games; F: Goals in favor; A: Goals against; D: Difference.

=== Group 1 ===
Team	Pld	W	D	L	GF	GA	GD	Pts
(Colombia) Independiente Medellín	6	3	2	1	6	1	+5	8
(Paraguay) Olimpia	6	3	2	1	5	3	+2	8
(Colombia) Junior	6	2	1	3	4	5	-1	5
(Paraguay) Cerro Porteño	6	1	1	4	4	10	-6	3

	OLI	CPO	JUN	MED
Olimpia		1 - 0	1 - 0	0 - 2
Cerro Porteño	1 - 3		1 - 0	0 - 0
Junior	0 - 0	3 - 2		0 - 1
I. Medellín	0 - 0	3 - 0	0 - 1	

=== Group 2 ===
Team	Pld	W	D	L	GF	GA	GD	Pts
(Argentina) Vélez Sarsfield	6	3	2	1	8	7	+1	8
(Brazil) Cruzeiro	6	3	1	2	7	8	-1	7
(Brazil) Palmeiras	6	3	0	3	14	7	+7	6
(Argentina) Boca Juniors	6	1	1	4	7	14	-7	3

	VEL	BOC	PAL	CRU
Vélez Sarsfield		1 - 1	1 - 0	2 - 0
Boca Juniors	1 - 2		2 - 1	1 - 2
Palmeiras	4 - 1	6 - 1		2 - 0
Cruzeiro	1 - 1	2 - 1	2 - 1	

=== Group 3 ===
Team	Pld	W	D	L	GF	GA	GD	Pts
(Ecuador) Emelec	6	3	1	2	9	5	+4	7
(Ecuador) Barcelona	6	2	2	2	5	3	+2	6
(Peru) Universitario	6	2	2	2	4	5	-1	6
(Peru) Alianza Lima	6	2	1	3	6	11	-5	5

	EME	BSC	UNI	ALI
Emelec		0 - 1	2 - 0	3 - 0
Barcelona	0 - 1		0 - 0	3 - 0
Universitario	2 - 1	0 - 0		0 - 1
Alianza Lima	2 - 2	2 - 1	1 - 2	

=== Group 4 ===
Team	Pld	W	D	L	GF	GA	GD	Pts
(Chile) Colo-Colo	6	4	1	1	11	6	+5	9
(Chile) Unión Española	6	3	1	2	6	6	0	7
(Uruguay) Defensor Sporting	6	1	3	2	3	5	-2	5
(Uruguay) Nacional	6	1	1	4	5	8	-3	3

	DEF	NAC	UES	COL
Defensor Sp.		1 - 0	1 - 1	0 - 0
Nacional	1 - 1		0 - 1	2 - 0
UE	1 - 0	1 - 0		1 - 2
Colo-Colo	2 - 0	4 - 2	3 - 1	

=== Group 5 ===
Team	Pld	W	D	L	GF	GA	GD	Pts
(Bolivia) Bolívar	6	3	3	0	9	2	+7	9
(Bolivia) The Strongest	6	2	3	1	13	7	+6	7
(Venezuela) Minervén	6	2	1	3	10	17	-7	5
(Venezuela) Marítimo	6	1	1	4	7	13	-6	3

	BOL	STR	MIN	SMA
Bolívar		0 - 0	4 - 0	2 - 1
The Strongest	0 - 0		7 - 1	5 - 0
Minervén	1 - 1	5 - 0		2 - 1
Sport Marítimo	0 - 2	1 - 1	4 - 1	

== Final Phase ==
Round of 16
(Colombia) I. Medellín	1	2	3
(Peru) Universitario	2	0	2
(Chile) Colo-Colo	1	2	3 (3)
(Colombia) Junior (p)	1	2	3 (4)
(Ecuador) Emelec	0	3	3 (2)
(Venezuela) Minervén	2	1	3 (4)
(Argentina) Vélez Sarsfield (p)	1	0	1 (4)
(Uruguay) Defensor Sporting	1	0	1 (2)
(Paraguay) Olimpia	1	2	3
(Ecuador) Barcelona	0	1	1
(Bolivia) Bolívar	2	4	6
(Bolivia) The Strongest	1	0	1
(Brazil) São Paulo	0	2	2
(Brazil) Palmeiras	0	1	1
(Brazil) Cruzeiro	0	0	0
(Chile) Unión Española	0	1	1

Quarter-finals
(Colombia) I. Medellín	0	0	0
(Colombia) Junior	2	0	2
(Venezuela) Minervén	0	0	0
(Argentina) Vélez Sarsfield	0	2	2
(Paraguay) Olimpia	1	2	3
(Bolivia) Bolívar	0	0	0
(Brazil) São Paulo	1	4	5
(Chile) Unión Española	1	3	4

Semi-finals
(Colombia) Junior	2	1	3 (4)
(Argentina) Vélez Sarsfield (p)	1	2	3 (5)
(Paraguay) Olimpia	1	1	2 (3)
(Brazil) São Paulo (p)	2	0	2 (4)

Final
(Argentina) Vélez Sarsfield (p)	1	0	1 (5)
(Brazil) São Paulo	0	1	1 (3)

== Finals ==
24 August 1994	Vélez Sarsfield (Argentina)	1 – 0	(Brazil) São Paulo	Estádio José Amalfitani, Liniers
	Asad 35'			Attendance: 55,000; Referee: Torres (COL)

31 August 1994	São Paulo (Brazil)	1 – 0 (3-5 p)	(Argentina) Vélez Sarsfield	Estádio do Morumbi, São Paulo
	Müller 33'			Attendance: 93,000; Referee: Filippi (URU)
	Penalties
	Palhinha (penalty missed); André Luiz (penalty scored); Müller (penalty scored); Euller (penalty scored)		(penalty scored) Trotta; (penalty scored) Chilavert; (penalty scored) Zandoná; (penalty scored) Almandoz; (penalty scored) Pompei

== Champion ==
Copa Libertadores 1994:

Vélez Sarsfield
First Title
