= 1995–96 Argentine Primera División =

Primera División
- Season: 1995–96
- Dates: 4 August 1995 – 22 August 1996
- Champions: Apertura: Vélez Sársfield (3rd. title); Clausura: Vélez Sársfield (4th. title)
- 1997 Copa Libertadores: Vélez Sarsfield; Racing
- 1996 Copa CONMEBOL: Lanús

The 1995–96 Argentine Primera División was a season of top-flight professional football in Argentina. The league season had Vélez Sársfield winning both, Apertura and Clausura championships (3rd. and 4th. league titles for the club). Estudiantes de La Plata (as champion of 1994–95 Primera B Nacional) and Colón de Santa Fe (winner of "Torneo Octogonal" after beating San Martín de Tucumán in a two-legged series) promoted from the Primera B Nacional (second division).

On the other hand, Belgrano (Córdoba) and Argentinos Juniors were relegated to Primera B Nacional.

The 1994 Apertura was the first season in which the league implemented a system awarding 3 points per match won, after FIFA had ruled it worldwide.

== Torneo Apertura ==
Apertura
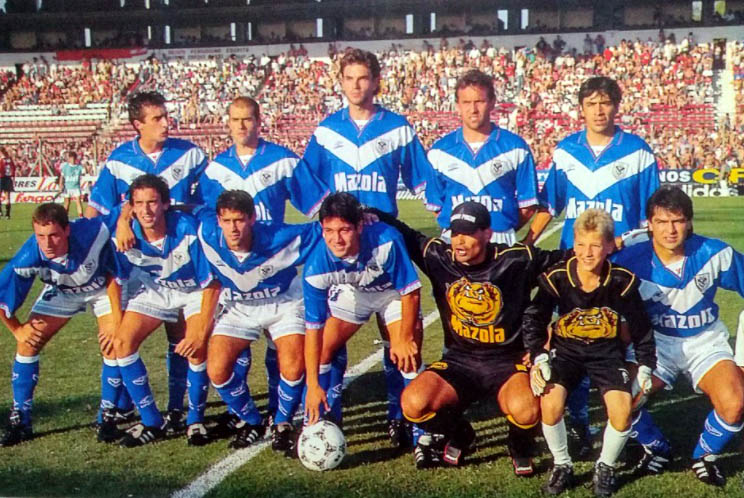
- Vélez Sársfield, champions
- Season: 1995
- Dates: 4 August – 18 December
- Champions: Vélez Sársfield (3rd. title)
- Promoted: Estudiantes LP; Colón
- Top goalscorer: José Luis Calderón (13 goals)
- Biggest home win: GELP 6–0 Racing (10 Aug)
- Biggest away win: Banfield 2–5 San Lorenzo (10 Dec)
- Highest scoring: Boca Juniors 4–6 Racing (3 Dec)

=== League table ===
Pos	Team	Pld	W	D	L	GF	GA	GD	Pts
1	Vélez Sársfield	19	13	2	4	29	13	+16	41
2	Racing	19	10	5	4	35	24	+11	35
3	Lanús	19	9	6	4	25	16	+9	33
4	Boca Juniors	19	9	5	5	27	19	+8	32
5	San Lorenzo	19	9	5	5	30	24	+6	32
6	Huracán	20	8	6	6	25	22	+3	30
7	River Plate	19	7	8	4	21	20	+1	29
8	Gimnasia y Esgrima (J)	19	8	4	7	28	30	−2	28
9	Estudiantes (LP)	19	6	7	6	29	23	+6	25
10	Rosario Central	19	5	9	5	18	20	−2	24
11	Platense	19	5	8	6	25	24	+1	23
12	Newell's Old Boys	19	5	8	6	26	32	−6	23
13	Colón	19	5	6	8	22	20	+2	21
14	Independiente	19	4	9	6	15	18	−3	21
15	Gimnasia y Esgrima (LP)	19	5	6	8	14	25	−11	21
16	Argentinos Juniors	19	5	4	10	18	22	−4	19
17	Ferro Carril Oeste	19	3	8	8	21	29	−8	17
18	Deportivo Español	19	3	8	8	18	26	−8	17
19	Banfield	19	2	8	9	17	29	−12	14
20	Belgrano	19	2	7	10	12	23	−11	13

=== Top scorers ===
Rank.	Player	Team	Goals
1	(Argentina) José Luis Calderón	Estudiantes (LP)	13
2	(Argentina) Claudio Biaggio	San Lorenzo	10
2	(Argentina) Rubén Capria	Racing	10
3	(Argentina) Claudio López	Racing	9

== Torneo Clausura ==
Clausura
- Season: 1996
- Dates: 8 March – 22 August
- Champions: Vélez Sársfield (4th. title)
- Relegated: Belgrano (C); Argentinos Juniors
- Top goalscorer: Ariel López (12 goals)
- Biggest home win: Vélez 5–1 Lanús (26 May); Vélez 5–1 Boca (16 June)
- Biggest away win: Boca Juniors 0–6 GELP (5 May)

=== League standings ===
Pos	Team	Pld	W	D	L	GF	GA	GD	Pts
1	Vélez Sársfield	19	11	7	1	40	18	+22	40
2	Gimnasia y Esgrima (LP)	19	12	3	4	44	21	+23	39
3	Lanús	19	10	4	5	35	24	+11	34
4	Estudiantes (LP)	19	9	7	3	33	22	+11	34
5	Boca Juniors	19	10	3	6	30	26	+4	33
6	Rosario Central	19	8	6	5	33	23	+10	30
7	Huracán	19	7	8	4	32	29	+3	29
8	Racing	19	8	5	6	26	25	+1	29
9	Colón	19	7	5	7	20	21	−1	26
10	Ferro Carril Oeste	19	6	8	5	16	20	−4	26
11	Deportivo Español	19	5	9	5	19	19	0	24
12	Independiente	19	5	8	6	22	26	−4	23
13	Belgrano	19	6	4	9	23	26	−3	22
14	River Plate	19	6	3	10	32	33	−1	21
15	Platense	19	6	3	10	23	29	−6	21
16	Gimnasia y Esgrima (J)	19	6	3	10	22	37	−15	21
17	Newell's Old Boys	19	3	9	7	20	28	−8	18
18	Banfield	19	4	5	10	20	25	−5	17
19	San Lorenzo	19	4	4	11	15	29	−14	16
20	Argentinos Juniors	19	3	4	12	12	36	−24	13

=== Top scorers ===
Rank.	Player	Team	Goals
1	(Argentina) Ariel López	Lanús	12
2	(Argentina) Martín Palermo	Estudiantes (LP)	11
3	(Argentina) Claudio Caniggia	Boca Juniors	10
3	(Argentina) Adrián Coria	Platense	10
3	(Argentina) Alberto Márcico	Gimnasia y Esgrima (LP)	10

== See also ==
- 1995–96 in Argentine football
