= 1990–91 Argentine Primera División =

100th season of top-tier football league in Argentina

Primera División
- Season: 1990–91
- Dates: August 20, 1990 – June 30, 1991
- Champions: Newell's Old Boys (3rd title)
- Promoted: Huracán; Lanús
- Relegated: Chaco For Ever; Lanús
- 1992 Copa Libertadores: Newell's Old Boys; San Lorenzo
- Top goalscorer: Esteban González (18 goals)
- Biggest home win: Boca Juniors 6–1 Racing(2 Jun. 1991)
- Biggest away win: Chaco For Ever 1–5 Newell's Old Boys (23 Sept. 1990); Gimnasia y Esgrima (LP) 0–4 Argentinos Juniors (4 Nov. 1990); Platense 1–5 Vélez Sarsfield (11 Nov. 1990); Unión 1–5 Boca Juniors (8 Mar. 1991); Huracán 0–4 Deportivo Español (9 Jun. 1991)
- Highest scoring: Unión 4–4 Talleres de Córdoba (22 Dec. 1990)

The 1990–91 Argentine Primera División was the 100th season of top-flight professional football in Argentina. This season saw the introduction of the Apertura and Clausura system in Argentina. The season began on 20 August 1990 and ended on 30 June 1991.

Newell's Old Boys won the 1990 Apertura and Boca Juniors won the 1991 Clausura. Unlike following seasons, Apertura and Clausura titles were not officially recognised by the AFA so both teams had to play a two-legged final to crown a champion for the entire season. After a 1–1 tie on aggregate, Newell's Old Boys won the championship 3–1 by penalty shoot-out.

San Lorenzo won the Liguilla pre-Libertadores after beating Boca Juniors, therefore qualifying to the 1992 edition.

== Competition format ==
The tournament for the 1990–91 season was composed of 20 teams. Each team played each other teams in a single round-robin tournament. The season was divided in two separate championships, called Apertura (Opening) and Clausura (Closing). The winning teams from each tournament played a two-legged final for the season championship and to earn one of the two berths allocated to Argentine clubs in the 1992 Copa Libertadores. The remaining berth was allocated via a direct elimination tournament between the top four (or five, depending on the outcome of the season final) teams from both Clausura and Apertura. Relegation occurred at the end of the Clausura stage, with the two teams with the worst three-year point average (Primera División competition only) being relegated to Primera B Nacional competition.

== Apertura Tournament ==
The "Apertura" Tournament began on 20 August 1990 and finished on 22 December 1990. Newell's Old Boys won the tournament and would play the championship final against the winner from the Clausura Tournament. The match played between Boca Juniors and San Lorenzo was suspended following incidents in the stands during halftime that resulted in the death of a supporter. No points were awarded to both teams.

Pos	Team	Pld	W	D	L	GF	GA	GD	Pts	Qualification
1	Newell's Old Boys	19	11	6	2	30	13	+17	28	Qualified to Championship decider
2	River Plate	19	11	4	4	29	13	+16	26	Qualified to 1992 Copa Libertadores Qualifier
3	Vélez Sarsfield	19	8	8	3	27	18	+9	24	Qualified to 1992 Copa Libertadores Qualifier
4	Argentinos Juniors	19	9	5	5	25	17	+8	23	Qualified to 1992 Copa Libertadores Qualifier
5	Rosario Central	19	9	5	5	26	21	+5	23	
6	Ferro Carril Oeste	19	7	9	3	19	16	+3	23	
7	Estudiantes (LP)	19	6	8	5	17	17	0	20	
8	Boca Juniors	19	6	7	6	18	16	+2	19	
9	Huracán	19	5	9	5	20	19	+1	19	
10	Independiente	19	6	6	7	21	22	−1	18	
11	San Lorenzo	19	4	10	5	15	18	−3	18	
12	Talleres (C)	19	7	4	8	23	27	−4	18	
13	Racing	19	2	13	4	19	21	−2	17	
14	Gimnasia y Esgrima (LP)	19	2	12	5	15	20	−5	16	
15	Platense	19	5	6	8	16	22	−6	16	
16	Chaco For Ever	19	6	4	9	19	28	−9	16	
17	Deportivo Mandiyú	19	4	7	8	17	21	−4	15	
18	Deportivo Español	19	4	6	9	18	24	−6	14	
19	Unión	19	4	5	10	21	28	−7	13	
20	Lanús	19	3	5	11	11	27	−16	11	

Source: Argentina 1990/91, Pablo Ciullini at Rec.Sport.Soccer Statistics Foundation.

== Clausura Tournament ==
Pos	Team	Pld	W	D	L	GF	GA	GD	Pts	Qualification
1	Boca Juniors	19	13	6	0	32	6	+26	32	Qualified to Championship decider
2	San Lorenzo	19	11	5	3	29	18	+11	27	Qualified to 1992 Copa Libertadores Qualifier
3	Deportivo Mandiyú	19	8	7	4	20	13	+7	23	Qualified to 1992 Copa Libertadores Qualifier
4	Racing	19	9	5	5	23	22	+1	23	Qualified to 1992 Copa Libertadores Qualifier
5	Independiente	19	6	10	3	22	15	+7	22	Qualified to 1992 Copa Libertadores Qualifier
6	Vélez Sarsfield	19	7	7	5	25	22	+3	21	
7	Huracán	19	7	7	5	16	16	0	21	
8	Newell's Old Boys	19	6	8	5	21	14	+7	20	
9	Estudiantes (LP)	19	6	7	6	18	15	+3	19	
10	River Plate	19	4	11	4	19	19	0	19	
11	Platense	19	5	9	5	11	16	−5	19	
12	Lanús	19	5	8	6	15	16	−1	18	
13	Unión	19	3	12	4	21	26	−5	18	
14	Gimnasia y Esgrima (LP)	19	4	9	6	16	22	−6	17	
15	Rosario Central	19	4	8	7	15	23	−8	16	
16	Ferro Carril Oeste	19	2	11	6	15	20	−5	15	
17	Deportivo Español	19	4	6	9	22	25	−3	14	
18	Argentinos Juniors	19	3	7	9	19	30	−11	13	
19	Chaco For Ever	19	1	10	8	15	26	−11	12	
20	Talleres (C)	19	4	3	12	24	34	−10	11	

Source: Argentina 1990/91, Pablo Ciullini at Rec.Sport.Soccer Statistics Foundation.

== Championship decider ==
The championship decider was played between Newell's Old Boys and Boca Juniors, champions from the Apertura and Clausura tournaments respectively. After finishing with a 1–1 global score, Newell's won the final on penalties. With this result, Newell's was granted one of two Argentine berths for the 1992 Copa Libertadores. Boca Juniors played in the qualifier to compete for the remaining berth.

Team 1	Team 2	Series	Date	Result	Venue	City
Newell's Old Boys	Boca Juniors	1st. leg	6 July	1–0	Gigante de Arroyito	Rosario
Newell's Old Boys	Boca Juniors	2nd. leg	9 July	0–1 (a.e.t.) (3–1 p)	La Bombonera	Buenos Aires

== Copa Libertadores qualifier ==
The qualifier for the 1992 Copa Libertadores was played between 13 July and 11 August 1991. San Lorenzo won the final against Boca Juniors and earned the remaining berth for the tournament.

Quarterfinals
Independiente	1	1	1
San Lorenzo	1	2	3
River Plate	2	2	4
Deportivo Mandiyú	0	0	0
Vélez Sarsfield	3	1	4
Racing	0	5	5
Boca Juniors	0	2	2
Argentinos Juniors	1	0	1

Semifinals
San Lorenzo	0	0	0 (4)
River Plate	0	0	0 (2)
Racing	1	0	1 (1)
Boca Juniors	1	0	1 (4)

Finals
San Lorenzo	1	1	2
Boca Juniors	0	0	0

== Relegation ==
At the end of the season Lanús and Chaco For Ever were relegated after finishing with the two worst points averages.

Team	Average	Points	Played	1988–89	1989–90	1990–91
Boca Juniors	1.254	143	114	49	43	51
River Plate	1.254	143	114	45	53	45
Independiente	1.237	141	114	55	46	40
San Lorenzo	1.070	122	114	42	35	45
Racing	1.061	121	114	42	39	40
Vélez Sársfield	1.053	120	114	33	42	45
Huracán	1.053	40	38	N/A	N/A	40
Newell's Old Boys	1.044	119	114	35	36	48
Rosario Central	1.035	118	114	36	43	39
Argentinos Juniors	1.018	116	114	42	38	36
Estudiantes (LP)	1.009	115	114	42	34	39
Talleres (C)	0.956	109	114	44	36	29
Gimnasia y Esgrima (LP)	0.947	108	114	36	39	33
Ferro Carril Oeste	0.939	107	114	30	39	38
Deportivo Mandiyú	0.939	107	114	33	36	38
Deportivo Español	0.921	105	114	46	31	28
Platense	0.912	104	114	33	36	35
Unión	0.882	67	76	N/A	36	31
Chaco For Ever	0.789	60	76	N/A	32	28
Lanús	0.763	29	38	N/A	N/A	29

== See also ==
- 1990–91 in Argentine football
