= 1988–89 in Argentine football =

Football in Argentina
- Season: 1988–89

1988–89 in Argentine football saw Independiente win the Argentine championship. In the international competitions there were two editions of the Copa Libertadores, the best performance came from Newell's Old Boys who were runners up in the Copa Libertadores 1988. Racing Club were the inaugural champions of the Supercopa Sudamericana, their first championship of any description since 1967.

== League championship ==
The Argentine league championship featured an unusual points system. After each drawn match there was a penalty shootout to determine which team got the bonus point.

- 3 points: won match
- 2 points: draw, win on penalties
- 1 point: draw, loss on penalties

0 points: lost match

The tournament also featured an unofficial Apertura tournament to determine the two teams to qualify for the Copa Libertadores 1989. Racing Club and Boca Juniors were in the top two positions at the halfway stage of the season (after 19 games), and qualified.

=== Final table ===
Position	Team	Points	Played	Won	Drawn	Lost	For	Against	Difference	Penalty wins	Penalty defeats
1	Independiente	84	38	22	11	5	58	32	26	7	4
2	Boca Juniors	76	38	20	9	9	56	38	18	7	2
3	D. Español	68	38	16	14	8	45	31	14	6	8
4	River Plate	67	38	16	13	9	51	36	15	6	7
5	San Lorenzo	66	38	16	10	12	58	44	14	8	2
6	Talleres	65	38	16	12	10	48	43	5	5	7
7	Argentinos	61	38	13	16	9	55	39	16	6	10
8	Estudiantes	61	38	15	12	11	53	41	12	4	8
9	Racing Club	59	38	13	16	9	47	41	6	6	10
10	Gimnasia (LP)	57	38	10	16	12	31	30	1	11	5
11	Vélez Sársfield	53	38	8	17	13	37	54	-17	12	5
12	Newell's	51	38	11	13	14	42	44	-2	7	6
13	Rosario Central	51	38	10	16	12	49	55	-6	7	9
14	Textil Mandiyú	51	38	7	19	12	35	44	-9	11	8
15	Platense	50	38	11	11	16	36	51	-15	6	5
16	Racing (C)	50	38	11	11	16	38	54	-16	6	5
17	San Martín (T)	46	38	12	10	16	38	49	-11	2	8
18	Ferro	45	38	8	14	16	35	43	-8	7	7
19	D. Armenio	37	38	5	15	18	29	57	-28	7	8
20	Instituto	31	38	7	9	22	38	65	-27	1	8

- Independiente qualify for Copa Libertadores 1990 as Argentine Champions.

=== Top Scorers ===
Position	Player	Team	Goals
1	Oscar Dertycia	Argentinos Juniors	20
1	Néstor Raúl Gorosito	San Lorenzo	20
3	Juan Comas	Racing Club	19
4	Ariel Cozzoni	Instituto de Córdoba	18

=== Relegation ===
Team	Average	Points	Played	1986-87	1987-88	1988-89
Independiente	1.219	139	114	47	37	55
Newell's Old Boys	1.193	136	114	48	55	33
San Lorenzo	1.184	135	114	44	49	42
Racing Club	1.158	132	114	44	48	40
Boca Juniors	1.140	130	114	46	35	49
River Plate	1.140	130	114	39	46	45
Rosario Central	1.079	123	114	49	40	34
Deportivo Español	1.070	122	114	36	40	46
Gimnasia de La Plata	1.018	116	114	37	43	36
Vélez Sársfield	1.009	115	114	41	41	33
Estudiantes de La Plata	0.974	111	114	37	32	42
Argentinos Juniors	0.965	110	114	28	40	42
Talleres de Córdoba	0.956	109	114	38	27	44
Ferro Carril Oeste	0.939	107	114	44	33	30
Textil Mandiyú	0.868	33	38	N/A	N/A	33
Platense	0.860	98	114	27	38	33
Instituto de Córdoba	0.851	97	114	41	33	23
Racing de Córdoba	0.851	97	114	33	31	33
San Martín de Tucumán	0.842	32	38	N/A	N/A	32
Deportivo Armenio	0.776	59	76	N/A	34	25

=== Liguilla Pre-Libertadores ===
==== Winners tournament ====
Quarter finals

Home (1st leg)	Home (2nd leg)	1st Leg	2nd leg	Aggregate
Chaco For Ever	Boca Juniors	0-1	1-2	1-3
Argentinos Juniors	River Plate	2-0	0-1	2-1
Platense	Deportivo Español	0-0	3-1	3-1
Talleres	San Lorenzo	0-2	1-1	1-3

Semi finals

		Score
Argentinos Juniors	San Lorenzo	1-3
Platense	Boca Juniors	1-1

Winners Final

Home (1st leg)	Home (2nd leg)	1st Leg	2nd leg	Aggregate
Boca Juniors	San Lorenzo	1-1	0-4	1-5

- San Lorenzo qualified to play a final with the winner of the requalifying tournament.

==== Requalifying tournament ====
First round

Home (1st leg)	Home (2nd leg)	1st Leg	2nd leg	Aggregate
Argentinos Juniors	River Plate	0-1	0-4	0-5
Deportivo Español	Newell's Old Boys	1-0	0-0	1-0

Second round

Home (1st leg)	Home (2nd leg)	1st Leg	2nd leg	Aggregate
River Plate	Deportivo Español	1-0	1-0	2-0

Requalifying Final

Home (1st leg)	Home (2nd leg)	1st Leg	2nd leg	3rd leg	Aggregate
River Plate	Boca Juniors	0-0	0-0	2-1	2-1

==== Liguilla Final ====
Home (1st leg)	Home (2nd leg)	1st Leg	2nd leg	Aggregate
San Lorenzo	River Plate	1-0	0-0	1-0

- River Plate qualified for Copa Libertadores 1990

== Argentine clubs in international competitions ==
Team	Recopa 1988	Supercopa 1988	Copa Libertadores 1988	Copa Libertadores 1989
Racing Club	Runner up	Champions	did not qualify	2nd round
Newell's Old Boys	N/A	N/A	Runner up	did not qualify
San Lorenzo	N/A	N/A	SF	did not qualify
River Plate	N/A	SF	did not qualify	did not qualify
Argentinos Juniors	N/A	QF	did not qualify	did not qualify
Boca Juniors	N/A	Round 1	did not qualify	Round 2
Estudiantes	N/A	Round 1	did not qualify	did not qualify
Independiente	N/A	Round 1	did not qualify	did not qualify
