= 1988–89 Argentine Primera División =

98th season of top-tier football league in Argentina

Primera División
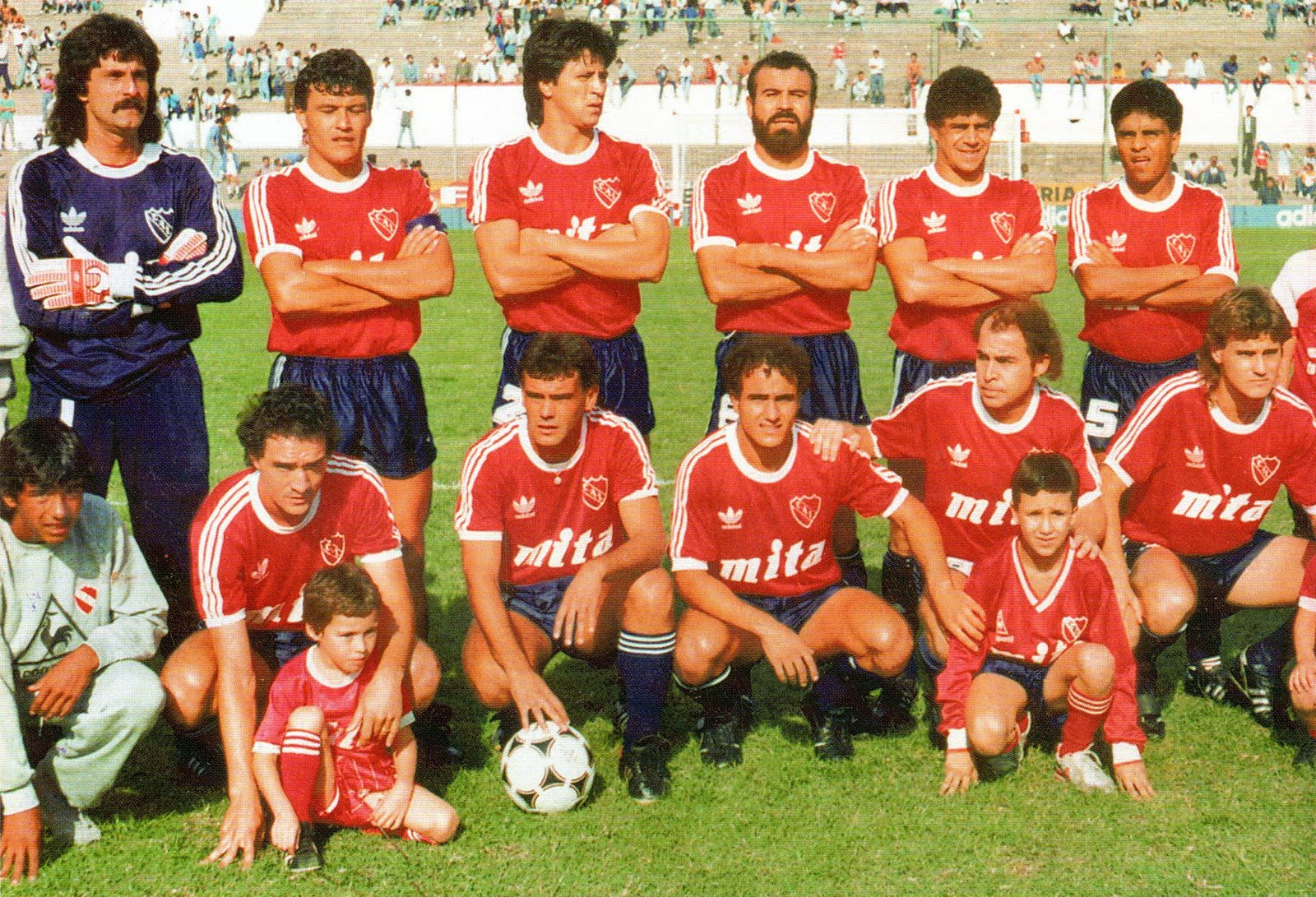
- Independiente, champions
- Season: 1988–89
- Dates: 11 September 1988 – 28 May 1989
- Champions: Independiente (14th title)
- Relegated: Deportivo Armenio; San Martín (T)
- 1989 Copa Libertadores: Racing Club; Boca Juniors
- 1990 Copa Libertadores: Independiente; River Plate
- Top goalscorer: (Argentina) Oscar Dertycia (Argentina) Néstor Gorosito (20 goals each)

The 1988–89 Argentine Primera División was the 98th season of top-flight football in Argentina. The season ran from September 11, 1988, to May 28, 1989.

This tournament introduced the use of penalty shootouts to resolve tie games. Due to lack of interest, it was discontinued for the following season.

This championships served as qualification for both Copa Libertadores editions, 1989 and 1990 (in the last case, through a "Liguilla", contested by clubs placed 2nd to 7th plus Chaco for Ever (Primera B Nacional champion) and Platense (winner of the 1987 Liguilla).

Independiente won the championship (14th league title) while San Martín (T) and Deportivo Armenio were relegated. River Plate won the Liguilla pre-Libertadores, qualifying to the 1990 edition.

== League standings ==
Pos	Team	Pld	W	D	L	GF	GA	GD	BP	Pts
1	Independiente	38	22	11	5	58	32	+26	7	84
2	Boca Juniors	38	20	9	9	56	38	+18	7	76
3	Deportivo Español	38	16	14	8	45	31	+14	6	68
4	River Plate	38	16	13	9	51	36	+15	6	67
5	San Lorenzo	38	16	10	12	58	44	+14	8	66
6	Talleres (C)	38	16	12	10	48	43	+5	5	65
7	Argentinos Juniors	38	13	16	9	55	39	+16	6	61
8	Estudiantes (LP)	38	15	12	11	53	41	+12	4	61
9	Racing	38	13	16	9	47	41	+6	4	59
10	Gimnasia y Esgrima (LP)	38	10	16	12	31	30	+1	11	57
11	Vélez Sársfield	38	8	17	13	37	54	−17	12	53
12	Newell's Old Boys	38	11	13	14	42	44	−2	5	51
13	Rosario Central	38	10	16	12	49	55	−6	5	51
14	Deportivo Mandiyú	38	7	19	12	35	44	−9	11	51
15	Platense	38	11	11	16	36	51	−15	6	50
16	Racing (C)	38	11	11	16	38	54	−16	6	50
17	San Martín (T)	38	12	10	16	38	49	−11	0	46
18	Ferro Carril Oeste	38	8	14	16	35	43	−8	7	45
19	Deportivo Armenio	38	5	15	18	29	57	−28	7	37
20	Instituto	38	7	9	22	38	65	−27	1	31

- Independiente qualify for Copa Libertadores 1990 as Argentine Champions.

== Top scorers ==
Position	Player	Team	Goals
1	Oscar Dertycia	Argentinos Juniors	20
1	Néstor Gorosito	San Lorenzo	20
3	Juan Comas	Racing	19
4	Ariel Cozzoni	Instituto	18

== Relegation ==
Team	Average	Points	Played	1986–87	1987–88	1988–89
Independiente	1.219	139	114	47	37	55
Newell's Old Boys	1.193	136	114	48	55	33
San Lorenzo	1.184	135	114	44	49	42
Racing	1.158	132	114	44	48	40
Boca Juniors	1.140	130	114	46	35	49
River Plate	1.140	130	114	39	46	45
Rosario Central	1.079	123	114	49	40	34
Deportivo Español	1.070	122	114	36	40	46
Gimnasia y Esgrima (LP)	1.018	116	114	37	43	36
Vélez Sársfield	1.009	115	114	41	41	33
Estudiantes (LP)	0.974	111	114	37	32	42
Argentinos Juniors	0.965	110	114	28	40	42
Talleres de Córdoba	0.956	109	114	38	27	44
Ferro Carril Oeste	0.939	107	114	44	33	30
Deportivo Mandiyú	0.868	33	38	N/A	N/A	33
Platense	0.860	98	114	27	38	33
Instituto	0.851	97	114	41	33	23
Racing (C)	0.851	97	114	33	31	33
San Martín (T)	0.842	32	38	N/A	N/A	32
Deportivo Armenio	0.776	59	76	N/A	34	25

== Liguilla Pre-Libertadores ==
=== Winners tournament ===
Quarter finals

Home (1st leg)	Home (2nd leg)	1st Leg	2nd leg	Aggregate
Chaco For Ever	Boca Juniors	0-1	1-2	1-3
Argentinos Juniors	River Plate	2-0	0-1	2-1
Platense	Deportivo Español	0-0	3-1	3-1
Talleres	San Lorenzo	0-2	1-1	1-3

Semi finals

		Score
Argentinos Juniors	San Lorenzo	1-3
Platense	Boca Juniors	1-1

Winners Final

Home (1st leg)	Home (2nd leg)	1st Leg	2nd leg	Aggregate
Boca Juniors	San Lorenzo	1-1	0-4	1-5

- San Lorenzo qualified to play a final with the winner of the requalifying tournament.

=== Requalifying tournament ===
First round

Home (1st leg)	Home (2nd leg)	1st Leg	2nd leg	Aggregate
Argentinos Juniors	River Plate	0-1	0-4	0-5
Deportivo Español	Newell's Old Boys	1-0	0-0	1-0

Second round

Home (1st leg)	Home (2nd leg)	1st Leg	2nd leg	Aggregate
River Plate	Deportivo Español	1-0	1-0	2-0

Requalifying Final

Home (1st leg)	Home (2nd leg)	1st Leg	2nd leg	3rd leg	Aggregate
River Plate	Boca Juniors	0-0	0-0	2-1	2-1

=== Liguilla Final ===
Home (1st leg)	Home (2nd leg)	1st Leg	2nd leg	Aggregate
San Lorenzo	River Plate	1-0	0-0	1-0

- River Plate qualified for Copa Libertadores 1990

== See also ==
- 1988-89 in Argentine football
