= 1992–93 in Argentine football =

Football in Argentina
- Season: 1992–93

1992–93 saw Boca Juniors win the Apertura, it was their first official league title since 1981. The Clausura was won by Vélez Sársfield, their first title since 1968.

== Torneo Apertura ("Opening" Tournament) ==
| Position | Team | Points | Played | Won | Drawn | Lost | For | Against | Difference |
|---|---|---|---|---|---|---|---|---|---|
| 1 | Boca Juniors | 27 | 19 | 10 | 7 | 2 | 24 | 11 | 13 |
| 2 | River Plate | 23 | 19 | 10 | 5 | 4 | 28 | 13 | 15 |
| 3 | San Lorenzo | 23 | 19 | 9 | 5 | 5 | 28 | 19 | 9 |
| 4 | Ferro Carril Oeste | 22 | 19 | 6 | 10 | 3 | 16 | 9 | 7 |
| 5 | Huracán | 22 | 19 | 9 | 4 | 6 | 26 | 22 | 4 |
| 6 | Vélez Sársfield | 21 | 19 | 8 | 5 | 6 | 23 | 15 | 8 |
| 7 | Estudiantes de La Plata | 20 | 19 | 7 | 6 | 6 | 21 | 14 | 7 |
| 8 | Belgrano de Córdoba | 20 | 19 | 7 | 6 | 6 | 22 | 22 | 0 |
| 9 | Lanús | 20 | 19 | 8 | 4 | 7 | 22 | 22 | 0 |
| 10 | Talleres de Córdoba | 20 | 19 | 6 | 8 | 5 | 18 | 20 | -2 |
| 11 | Deportivo Español | 19 | 19 | 7 | 5 | 7 | 19 | 18 | 1 |
| 12 | San Martín de Tucumán | 18 | 19 | 6 | 8 | 5 | 18 | 14 | 4 |
| 13 | Textil Mandiyú | 18 | 19 | 5 | 8 | 6 | 21 | 24 | -3 |
| 14 | Rosario Central | 18 | 19 | 7 | 4 | 8 | 19 | 29 | -10 |
| 15 | Independiente | 17 | 19 | 5 | 7 | 7 | 15 | 22 | -7 |
| 16 | Racing Club | 15 | 19 | 4 | 7 | 8 | 14 | 20 | -6 |
| 17 | Gimnasia de La Plata | 15 | 19 | 4 | 7 | 8 | 19 | 27 | -8 |
| 18 | Platense | 14 | 19 | 3 | 8 | 8 | 16 | 21 | -5 |
| 19 | Argentinos Juniors | 14 | 19 | 3 | 8 | 8 | 17 | 25 | -8 |
| 20 | Newell's Old Boys | 10 | 19 | 3 | 4 | 12 | 12 | 31 | -19 |

=== Top scorers ===
| Position | Player | Team | Goals |
|---|---|---|---|
| 1 | Alberto Acosta | San Loernzo | 12 |
| 2 | Jorge Cruz | Huracán | 11 |
| 3 | Luis Fabián Artime | Belgrano de Córdoba | 10 |
| 3 | Fernando di Carlo | Lanús | 10 |

=== Relegation ===
There is no relegation after the Apertura. For the relegation results of this tournament see below

== Torneo Clausura ("Closing" Tournament) ==
| Position | Team | Points | Played | Won | Drawn | Lost | For | Against | Difference |
|---|---|---|---|---|---|---|---|---|---|
| 1 | Vélez Sársfield | 27 | 19 | 10 | 7 | 2 | 23 | 7 | 16 |
| 2 | Independiente | 24 | 19 | 6 | 12 | 1 | 23 | 14 | 9 |
| 3 | River Plate | 23 | 19 | 10 | 3 | 6 | 33 | 21 | 12 |
| 4 | San Lorenzo | 22 | 19 | 8 | 6 | 5 | 27 | 19 | 8 |
| 5 | Deportivo Español | 22 | 19 | 9 | 4 | 6 | 24 | 18 | 6 |
| 6 | Rosario Central | 21 | 19 | 6 | 9 | 4 | 25 | 19 | 6 |
| 7 | Boca Juniors | 21 | 19 | 6 | 9 | 4 | 23 | 18 | 5 |
| 8 | Racing Club | 21 | 19 | 9 | 3 | 7 | 22 | 17 | 5 |
| 9 | Huracán | 21 | 19 | 7 | 7 | 5 | 24 | 23 | 1 |
| 10 | Argentinos Juniors | 19 | 19 | 3 | 13 | 3 | 12 | 12 | 0 |
| 11 | Gimnasia de La Plata | 19 | 19 | 5 | 9 | 5 | 14 | 15 | -1 |
| 12 | Textil Mandiyú | 19 | 19 | 5 | 9 | 5 | 19 | 22 | -3 |
| 13 | Estudiantes de La Plata | 18 | 19 | 5 | 8 | 6 | 23 | 20 | 3 |
| 14 | Belgrano de Córdoba | 18 | 19 | 4 | 10 | 5 | 13 | 22 | -9 |
| 15 | Lanús | 17 | 19 | 3 | 11 | 5 | 12 | 15 | -3 |
| 16 | Ferro Carril Oeste | 16 | 19 | 5 | 6 | 8 | 15 | 21 | -6 |
| 17 | Newell's Old Boys | 15 | 19 | 4 | 7 | 8 | 13 | 19 | -6 |
| 18 | Platense | 14 | 19 | 3 | 8 | 8 | 14 | 26 | -12 |
| 19 | San Martín de Tucumán | 12 | 19 | 4 | 4 | 11 | 17 | 30 | -13 |
| 20 | Talleres de Córdoba | 11 | 19 | 2 | 7 | 10 | 13 | 31 | -18 |

=== Notes ===
- Velez 1-1 Boca: Awarded to Velez 1-0
- Talleres 2-2 River Plate: Awarded to River 0-2
- Newell's 0-1 Talleres: Awarded to Newell's 1-0
- Talleres 1-0 Gimnasia La Plata: Awarded 0-1 to Gimnasia

=== Top scorers ===
| Position | Player | Team | Goals |
|---|---|---|---|
| 1 | Rubén Da Silva | River Plate | 13 |
| 2 | Sergio Martínez | Boca Juniors | 12 |

== Relegation ==
| Team | Average | Points | Played | 1991-92 | 1992-93 | 1993-94 |
|---|---|---|---|---|---|---|
| Boca Juniors | 1.307 | 149 | 114 | 51 | 50 | 48 |
| River Plate | 1.281 | 146 | 114 | 45 | 55 | 46 |
| Vélez Sársfield | 1.237 | 141 | 114 | 45 | 48 | 48 |
| San Lorenzo | 1.088 | 124 | 114 | 45 | 45 | 45 |
| Huracán | 1.061 | 121 | 114 | 40 | 38 | 43 |
| Independiente | 1.026 | 117 | 114 | 40 | 36 | 41 |
| Newell's Old Boys | 1.026 | 117 | 114 | 48 | 44 | 25 |
| Racing Club | 1.009 | 115 | 114 | 40 | 39 | 36 |
| Deportivo Español | 1.000 | 114 | 114 | 28 | 45 | 41 |
| Ferro Carril Oeste | 0.991 | 113 | 114 | 38 | 37 | 38 |
| Rosario Central | 0.982 | 112 | 114 | 39 | 34 | 39 |
| Lanús | 0.974 | 37 | 38 | N/A | N/A | 37 |
| Belgrano de Córdoba | 0.961 | 73 | 76 | N/A | 35 | 38 |
| Textil Mandiyú | 0.947 | 108 | 114 | 38 | 33 | 37 |
| Gimnasia de La Plata | 0.947 | 108 | 114 | 33 | 41 | 34 |
| Estudiantes de La Plata | 0.930 | 106 | 114 | 39 | 29 | 38 |
| Platense | 0.921 | 105 | 114 | 35 | 42 | 28 |
| Argentinos Juniors | 0.912 | 104 | 114 | 36 | 35 | 33 |
| Talleres de Córdoba | 0.851 | 97 | 114 | 29 | 37 | 31 |
| San Martín de Tucumán | 0.789 | 30 | 38 | N/A | N/A | 30 |

== Argentine clubs in international competitions ==
| Team | Supercopa 1992 | CONMEBOL 1992 | Copa Libertadores 1993 |
|---|---|---|---|
| Racing Club | runner up | N/A | |
| Gimnasia de La Plata | N/A | Semi final | did not qualify |
| Deportivo Español | N/A | QF | did not qualify |
| Estudiantes de La Plata | QF | N/A | did not qualify |
| River Plate | QF | N/A | Round 1 |
| Newell's Old Boys | N/A | N/A | Round 2 |
| Vélez Sársfield | N/A | Round 1 | did not qualify |
| Argentinos Juniors | Round 1 | N/A | did not qualify |
| Boca Juniors | Round 1 | N/A | did not qualify |
| Independiente | Round 1 | N/A | did not qualify |
