= 1992–93 Argentine Primera División =

Primera División
- Season: 1992–93
- Dates: 7 August 1992 – 12 June 1993
- Champions: Apertura: Boca Juniors (22nd. title); Clausura: Vélez Sársfield (2nd. title)
- 1994 Copa Libertadores: Boca Juniors; Vélez Sársfield
- 1993 Copa CONMEBOL: Huracán; Deportivo Español; San Lorenzo

The 1992–93 Argentine Primera División was a season of top-flight professional football in Argentina. The league season had two champions, with Boca Juniors winning the Apertura (22nd league title for the club), while Vélez Sársfield won the Clausura championship (2nd league title). Lanús (as champion of 1991–92 Primera B Nacional) and San Martín de Tucumán (winner of "Torneo Dodecagonal" after beating Almirante Brown in a two-legged series) were the teams promoted from the Primera B Nacional (second division).

On the other hand, Talleres de Córdoba and San Martín de Tucumán were related to Primera B Nacional.

== Torneo Apertura ==
Apertura
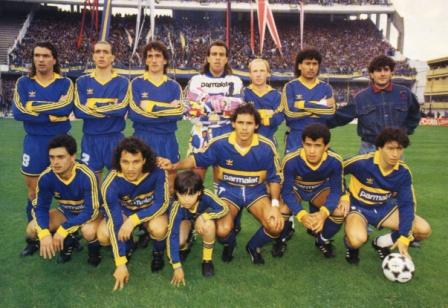
- Boca Juniors, Apertura champions
- Season: 1992
- Dates: 7 August – 20 December
- Champions: Boca Juniors (22nd title)
- Promoted: Lanús; San Martín (T)
- Top goalscorer: Alberto Acosta (12 goals)
- Biggest home win: Estudiantes (LP) 6–1 R. Central (1 Nov)
- Biggest away win: Dep. Mandiyú 1–5 Lanús (23 Aug)

=== Final standings ===
| Pos | Team | Pld | W | D | L | GF | GA | GD | Pts |
|---|---|---|---|---|---|---|---|---|---|
| 1 | Boca Juniors | 19 | 10 | 7 | 2 | 24 | 11 | +13 | 27 |
| 2 | River Plate | 19 | 10 | 5 | 4 | 28 | 13 | +15 | 23 (Note: River Plate had 2 points deducted) |
| 3 | San Lorenzo | 19 | 9 | 5 | 5 | 28 | 19 | +9 | 23 |
| 4 | Ferro Carril Oeste | 19 | 6 | 10 | 3 | 16 | 9 | +7 | 22 |
| 5 | Huracán | 19 | 9 | 4 | 6 | 26 | 22 | +4 | 22 |
| 6 | Vélez Sársfield | 19 | 8 | 5 | 6 | 23 | 15 | +8 | 21 |
| 7 | Estudiantes (LP) | 19 | 7 | 6 | 6 | 21 | 14 | +7 | 20 |
| 8 | Belgrano | 19 | 7 | 6 | 6 | 22 | 22 | 0 | 20 |
| 9 | Lanús | 19 | 8 | 4 | 7 | 22 | 22 | 0 | 20 |
| 10 | Talleres (C) | 19 | 6 | 8 | 5 | 18 | 20 | −2 | 20 |
| 11 | Deportivo Español | 19 | 7 | 5 | 7 | 19 | 18 | +1 | 19 |
| 12 | San Martín (T) | 19 | 6 | 8 | 5 | 18 | 14 | +4 | 18 (Note: San Martín de Tucumán had 2 points deducted) |
| 13 | Deportivo Mandiyú | 19 | 5 | 8 | 6 | 21 | 24 | −3 | 18 |
| 14 | Rosario Central | 19 | 7 | 4 | 8 | 19 | 29 | −10 | 18 |
| 15 | Independiente | 19 | 5 | 7 | 7 | 15 | 22 | −7 | 17 |
| 16 | Racing | 19 | 4 | 7 | 8 | 14 | 20 | −6 | 15 |
| 17 | Gimnasia y Esgrima (LP) | 19 | 4 | 7 | 8 | 19 | 27 | −8 | 15 |
| 18 | Platense | 19 | 3 | 8 | 8 | 16 | 21 | −5 | 14 |
| 19 | Argentinos Juniors | 19 | 3 | 8 | 8 | 17 | 25 | −8 | 14 |
| 20 | Newell's Old Boys | 19 | 3 | 4 | 12 | 12 | 31 | −19 | 10 |

=== Top scorers ===
| Rank. | Player | Team | Goals |
|---|---|---|---|
| 1 | (Argentina) Alberto Acosta | San Lorenzo | 12 |
| 2 | (Argentina) Jorge Cruz | Huracán | 11 |
| 3 | (Argentina) Luis Artime | Belgrano | 10 |
| 3 | (Argentina) Fernando di Carlo | Lanús | 10 |

=== Relegation ===
There is no relegation after the Apertura. For the relegation results of this tournament see below

== Torneo Clausura ==
Clausura
- Season: 1993
- Dates: 20 February – 12 June
- Champions: Vélez Sarsfield (2nd. title)
- Relegated: Talleres (C); San Martín (T)
- Top goalscorer: Rubén da Silva (13 goals)
- Biggest home win: River Plate 5–0 Belgrano (C) (20 Mar)
- Biggest away win: Belgrano (C) 0–4 Racing (8 Apr)
- Highest scoring: Boca Juniors 3–4 San Lorenzo (28 Mar)

=== Final standings ===
| Pos | Team | Pld | W | D | L | GF | GA | GD | Pts |
|---|---|---|---|---|---|---|---|---|---|
| 1 | Vélez Sársfield | 19 | 10 | 7 | 2 | 23 | 7 | +16 | 27 |
| 2 | Independiente | 19 | 6 | 12 | 1 | 23 | 14 | +9 | 24 |
| 3 | River Plate | 19 | 10 | 3 | 6 | 33 | 21 | +12 | 23 |
| 4 | San Lorenzo | 19 | 8 | 6 | 5 | 27 | 19 | +8 | 22 |
| 5 | Deportivo Español | 19 | 9 | 4 | 6 | 24 | 18 | +6 | 22 |
| 6 | Rosario Central | 19 | 6 | 9 | 4 | 25 | 19 | +6 | 21 |
| 7 | Boca Juniors | 19 | 6 | 9 | 4 | 23 | 18 | +5 | 21 |
| 8 | Racing | 19 | 9 | 3 | 7 | 22 | 17 | +5 | 21 |
| 9 | Huracán | 19 | 7 | 7 | 5 | 24 | 23 | +1 | 21 |
| 10 | Argentinos Juniors | 19 | 3 | 13 | 3 | 12 | 12 | 0 | 19 |
| 11 | Gimnasia y Esgrima (LP) | 19 | 5 | 9 | 5 | 14 | 15 | −1 | 19 |
| 12 | Deportivo Mandiyú | 19 | 5 | 9 | 5 | 19 | 22 | −3 | 19 |
| 13 | Estudiantes (LP) | 19 | 5 | 8 | 6 | 23 | 20 | +3 | 18 |
| 14 | Belgrano | 19 | 4 | 10 | 5 | 13 | 22 | −9 | 18 |
| 15 | Lanús | 19 | 3 | 11 | 5 | 12 | 15 | −3 | 17 |
| 16 | Ferro Carril Oeste | 19 | 5 | 6 | 8 | 15 | 21 | −6 | 16 |
| 17 | Newell's Old Boys | 19 | 4 | 7 | 8 | 13 | 19 | −6 | 15 |
| 18 | Platense | 19 | 3 | 8 | 8 | 14 | 26 | −12 | 14 |
| 19 | San Martín (T) | 19 | 4 | 4 | 11 | 17 | 30 | −13 | 12 |
| 20 | Talleres (C) | 19 | 2 | 7 | 10 | 13 | 31 | −18 | 11 |

=== Notes ===
- Velez 1-1 Boca: Awarded to Velez 1-0
- Talleres (C) 2-2 River Plate: Awarded to River 0-2
- Newell's 0-1 Talleres (C): Awarded to Newell's 1-0
- Talleres (C) 1-0 Gimnasia y Esgrima (LP): Awarded 0-1 to Gimnasia

=== Top scorers ===
| Rank. | Player | Team | Goals |
|---|---|---|---|
| 1 | (Uruguay) Rubén Da Silva | River Plate | 13 |
| 2 | (Uruguay) Sergio Martínez | Boca Juniors | 12 |

== Relegation ==
| Team | Average | Points | Played | 1991–92 | 1992–93 | 1993-94 |
|---|---|---|---|---|---|---|
| Boca Juniors | 1.307 | 149 | 114 | 51 | 50 | 48 |
| River Plate | 1.281 | 146 | 114 | 45 | 55 | 46 |
| Vélez Sársfield | 1.237 | 141 | 114 | 45 | 48 | 48 |
| San Lorenzo | 1.088 | 124 | 114 | 45 | 45 | 45 |
| Huracán | 1.061 | 121 | 114 | 40 | 38 | 43 |
| Independiente | 1.026 | 117 | 114 | 40 | 36 | 41 |
| Newell's Old Boys | 1.026 | 117 | 114 | 48 | 44 | 25 |
| Racing | 1.009 | 115 | 114 | 40 | 39 | 36 |
| Deportivo Español | 1.000 | 114 | 114 | 28 | 45 | 41 |
| Ferro Carril Oeste | 0.991 | 113 | 114 | 38 | 37 | 38 |
| Rosario Central | 0.982 | 112 | 114 | 39 | 34 | 39 |
| Lanús | 0.974 | 37 | 38 | N/A | N/A | 37 |
| Belgrano | 0.961 | 73 | 76 | N/A | 35 | 38 |
| Deportivo Mandiyú | 0.947 | 108 | 114 | 38 | 33 | 37 |
| Gimnasia y Esgrima (LP) | 0.947 | 108 | 114 | 33 | 41 | 34 |
| Estudiantes (LP) | 0.930 | 106 | 114 | 39 | 29 | 38 |
| Platense | 0.921 | 105 | 114 | 35 | 42 | 28 |
| Argentinos Juniors | 0.912 | 104 | 114 | 36 | 35 | 33 |
| Talleres (C) | 0.851 | 97 | 114 | 29 | 37 | 31 |
| San Martín (T) | 0.789 | 30 | 38 | N/A | N/A | 30 |

== See also ==
- 1992–93 in Argentine football
