= Juan Manuel Llop =

Argentine footballer and manager

Personal information
- Date of birth: 1 June 1963 (age 63)
- Place of birth: Arroyo Dulce, Argentina
- Position: Midfielder

Youth career
- Newell's Old Boys

Senior career*
Years	Team	Apps	(Gls)
1981–1994	Newell's Old Boys	365	(15)
1984	→ Estudiantes RC (loan)	6	(1)
1994–1995	Estudiantes LP	41	(0)
1995	Quilmes	11	(0)
1996	San Martín Tucumán	15	(2)
Total		438	(18)

Managerial career
- 2001–2002: Newell's Old Boys
- 2003–2004: Tacuary
- 2004–2005: Libertad
- 2005–2007: Godoy Cruz
- 2007–2008: Banfield
- 2008–2009: Racing Club
- 2009–2010: Barcelona SC
- 2011: Santiago Wanderers
- 2011–2012: Atlético Tucumán
- 2012–2013: Huracán
- 2013–2014: Manta
- 2015: Wilstermann
- 2016–2017: Atlético Rafaela
- 2017–2018: Newell's Old Boys
- 2018: Oriente Petrolero
- 2018–2019: Atlético Rafaela
- 2020: Carlos A. Mannucci
- 2020–2021: Platense
- 2022: Tristán Suárez
- * Club domestic league appearances and goals

Juan Manuel Llop (born 1 June 1963 in Arroyo Dulce, Santa Fe) is an Argentine football manager and former player who played as a midfielder.

Before taking up management Llop had a 15-year career as a football player, he made appearances for several clubs, most notably for Newell's Old Boys under coaches José Yudica and Marcelo Bielsa during the club's golden era (1987–1992), winning 3 Argentine titles.

== Managerial career ==
Llop became manager of Newell's Old Boys in 2001, but his reign only lasted 19 games before he was replaced. He then honed his skills as a manager in Paraguay, coaching Tacuary and Libertad until he returned to Argentina to take over Godoy Cruz de Mendoza, an insignificant provincial team struggling in the Second Division. The turnaround at the club was remarkable, they won the Primera B Nacional title and promotion to the Primera División in his first full season as their manager.

Godoy Cruz found themselves in the Primera for the first time in their history, making them the first team from Mendoza Province ever to play in the Argentine first division league (other than the brief relocation to Mendoza of Argentinos Juniors in the 1990s). Godoy Cruz were relegated at the end of the 2006–07 season despite a strong 10th-place finish.

In 2007 Llop was signed as the new manager of Club Atlético Banfield in the Primera Division, he was replaced by Miguel Jerez in 2008.

After that, he replaced Miguel Micó as manager for Racing Club de Avellaneda. The team finished last in the tournament but saved itself from relegation by beating Belgrano de Córdoba in Promoción. In 2009, he was sacked by Racing following a 2–0 defeat in the Avellaneda derby.

== Honours ==
=== Player ===
Newell's Old Boys

- Primera División Argentina: 1987–88, 1990–91, Clausura 1992
