= 1991–92 in Argentine football =

Football in Argentina
- Season: 1991–92

The 1991–92 season in Argentina saw River Plate win the Apertura championship and Newell's Old Boys win the Clausura championship. In the international competitions Newell's were runners up in the Copa Libertadores and River Plate were runners up in the Supercopa Sudamericana.

== Torneo Apertura ("Opening" Tournament) ==
Position	Team	Points	Played	Won	Drawn	Lost	For	Against	Difference
1	River Plate	31	19	14	3	2	33	11	22
2	Boca Juniors	24	19	7	10	2	22	15	7
3	San Lorenzo	22	19	4	14	1	20	14	6
4	Vélez Sársfield	21	19	8	5	6	27	18	9
5	Gimnasia de La Plata	21	19	7	7	5	16	17	-1
6	Deportivo Mandiyú	20	19	7	6	6	22	20	2
7	Platense	20	19	5	10	4	16	14	2
8	Talleres de Córdoba	20	19	7	6	6	19	21	-2
9	Argentinos Juniors	19	19	4	11	4	18	18	0
10	Ferro Carril Oeste	19	19	6	7	6	16	16	0
11	Independiente	19	19	6	7	6	20	21	-1
12	Huracán	19	19	5	9	5	18	21	-3
13	Racing Club	18	19	4	10	5	14	14	0
14	Deportivo Español	18	19	6	6	7	23	25	-2
15	Belgrano de Córdoba	17	19	3	11	5	15	17	-2
16	Rosario Central	17	19	4	9	6	17	21	-4
17	Estudiantes de La Plata	16	19	4	8	7	14	21	-7
18	Newell's Old Boys	15	19	3	9	7	14	16	-2
19	Unión de Santa Fe	14	19	3	8	8	13	21	-8
20	Quilmes	10	19	1	8	10	9	25	-16

Teams highlighted in light blue qualified for the Octagonal tournament.

=== Top Scorers ===
Position	Player	Team	Goals
1	Ramón Díaz	River Plate	14
2	Esteban González	Vélez Sársfield	11

=== Relegation ===
There is no relegation after the Apertura. For the relegation results of this tournament see below

== Torneo Clausura ("Closing" Tournament) ==
Position	Team	Points	Played	Won	Drawn	Lost	For	Against	Difference
1	Newell's Old Boys	29	19	11	7	1	27	8	19
2	Vélez Sársfield	27	19	10	7	2	29	16	13
3	Deportivo Español	27	19	9	9	1	24	11	13
4	Boca Juniors	26	19	10	6	3	20	11	9
5	Club Atlético River Plate	24	19	8	8	3	31	22	9
6	Platense	22	19	8	6	5	23	16	7
7	Racing Club	21	19	5	11	3	12	9	3
8	Gimnasia de La Plata	20	19	6	8	5	25	20	5
9	Huracán	19	19	5	9	5	18	19	-1
10	Belgrano de Córdoba	18	19	6	6	7	18	18	0
11	Ferro Carril Oeste	18	19	5	8	6	13	14	-1
12	Independiente	17	19	4	9	6	16	16	0
13	Talleres de Córdoba	17	19	4	9	6	14	17	-3
14	Rosario Central	17	19	8	1	10	19	24	-5
15	Argentinos Juniors	16	19	5	6	8	16	19	-3
16	Unión de Santa Fe	13	19	2	9	8	11	18	-7
17	Estudiantes de La Plata	13	19	2	9	8	14	26	-12
18	Deportivo Mandiyú	13	19	3	7	9	16	30	-14
19	San Lorenzo	12	19	3	6	10	11	25	-14
20	Quilmes	9	19	4	3	12	14	32	-18

Teams highlighted in light blue qualified for the Octagonal tournament.

=== Top Scorers ===
Position	Player	Team	Goals
1	Diego Latorre	Boca Juniors	9
2	Darío Scotto	Platense	9

== Relegation ==
Team	Average	Points	Played	1989-90	1990-91	1991-1992
River Plate	1.342	153	114	53	45	55
Boca Juniors	1.263	144	114	43	51	50
Vélez Sársfield	1.184	135	114	42	45	48
Newell's Old Boys	1.123	128	114	36	48	44
Independiente	1.070	122	114	46	40	36
Racing Club	1.035	118	114	39	40	39
Huracán	1.026	78	76	N/A	40	38
Rosario Central	1.018	116	114	43	39	34
Ferro Carril Oeste	1.000	114	114	39	38	37
San Lorenzo	1.000	114	114	35	45	34
Gimnasia de La Plata	0.991	113	114	39	33	41
Platense	0.991	113	114	36	35	42
Argentinos Juniors	0.956	109	114	38	36	35
Deportivo Mandiyú	0.939	107	114	36	38	33
Belgrano de Córdoba	0.921	35	38	N/A	N/A	35
Deportivo Español	0.912	104	114	31	28	45
Estudiantes de La Plata	0.895	102	114	34	39	29
Talleres de Córdoba	0.895	102	114	36	29	37
Unión de Santa Fe	0.825	94	114	36	31	27
Quilmes	0.500	19	38	N/A	N/A	19

== Qualification for Copa Libertadores 1993 ==
=== Champions qualification playoff ===
		1st Leg	2nd leg	3rd leg	Aggregate
River Plate	Newell's Old Boys	0-0	1-0	3-2	4-2

River Plate qualify for Copa Libertadores 1993

=== Octagonal tournament ===
Teams highlighted in light blue qualified for the Octagonal tournament.

Quarter-finals
July 10 - El Palacio
Deportivo Español	1
Racing Club	0
July 12 - El Palacio
Boca Juniors	2
San Lorenzo	0
July 12 - El Doble Visera
Platense	0
Gimnasia La Plata	1
July 12 - Ricardo Etcheverry
Velez Sarsfield	1 (4)
Huracán	0

Semi-finals
July 18 - José Amalfitani
Boca Juniors	0
Gimnasia La Plata	1
July 19 - Ricardo Etcheverry
Velez Sarsfield(Pens)	1 (4)
Deportivo Español	1 (2)

Final
July 26 - Monumental
Velez Sarsfield	3
Gimnasia La Plata	0

Velez Sarsfield to play Newell's Old Boys in the Libertadores playoff.

=== Playoff final ===
Final
August 2 - Gigante de Arroyito
Newell's Old Boys	1
Velez Sarsfield	0

Newell's Old Boys qualify for Copa Libertadores 1993.

== Argentine clubs in international competitions ==
Team	Supercopa 1991	1992 Copa Libertadores
Newell's Old Boys	N/A	Runner up
River Plate	Runner up	did not qualify
San Lorenzo	N/A	QF
Independiente	QF	did not qualify
Argentinos Juniors	Round 1	did not qualify
Boca Juniors	Round 1	did not qualify
Estudiantes de La Plata	Round 1	did not qualify
Racing Club	Round 1	did not qualify
