= 1989–90 in Argentine football =

Football in Argentina
- Season: 1989–90

== Primera División ==
=== League table ===
Pos	Team	Pld	W	D	L	GF	GA	GD	Pts	Qualification
1	River Plate	38	20	13	5	48	20	+28	53	1991 Copa Libertadores
2	Independiente	38	16	14	8	54	36	+18	46	Liguilla Pre-Libertadores
3	Boca Juniors	38	11	21	6	49	35	+14	43	Liguilla Pre-Libertadores
4	Rosario Central	38	16	13	9	45	36	+9	43 (Note: 2 points deducted)	Liguilla Pre-Libertadores
5	Vélez Sársfield	38	14	14	10	46	32	+14	42	
6	Ferro Carril Oeste	38	11	17	10	24	20	+4	39	
7	Gimnasia y Esgrima (LP)	38	12	15	11	34	31	+3	39	
8	Racing	38	11	17	10	34	34	0	39	
9	Argentinos Juniors	38	13	12	13	42	40	+2	38	
10	Deportivo Mandiyú	38	11	14	13	40	40	0	36	
11	Talleres (C)	38	12	14	12	45	46	−1	36	
12	Newell's Old Boys	38	12	14	12	40	43	−3	36	
13	Unión	38	10	16	12	40	43	−3	36	
14	Platense	38	13	10	15	35	40	−5	36	
15	San Lorenzo	38	10	15	13	44	50	−6	35	
16	Estudiantes (LP)	38	7	20	11	34	39	−5	34	
17	Chaco For Ever	38	10	12	16	40	56	−16	32	
18	Racing (C)	38	11	10	17	32	48	−16	32	
19	Deportivo Español	38	12	7	19	39	53	−14	31	Liguilla Pre-Libertadores
20	Instituto	38	8	10	20	31	56	−25	26	

=== Top scorers ===
Position	Player	Team	Goals
1	Ariel Cozzoni	Newell's Old Boys	23
2	Marío Bevilacque	Talleres (C)	16
3	Alberto Acosta	San Lorenzo	15
3	Juan Pizzi	Rosario Central	15
5	José Blanchart	Deportivo Mandiyú	13
5	José Castro	Unión de Santa Fe	13
5	Félix Torres	Deportivo Mandiyú	13

=== Liguilla Pre-Libertadores ===
Semi-finals
1	Boca Juniors	1	1	2
4	Deportivo Español	0	1	1
3	Independiente	1	3	4
2	Rosario Central	1	1	2

Finals
Boca Juniors	1	1	2
Independiente	0	0	0

Boca Juniors qualify for the 1991 Copa Libertadores

=== Relegation ===
Team	Average	Points	Played	1987–88	1988–89	1989-90
River Plate	1.263	144	114	46	44	53
Independiente	1.211	138	114	37	55	46
Boca Juniors	1.114	127	114	35	49	43
San Lorenzo	1.106	126	114	49	42	35
Racing	1.114	127	114	48	40	39
Newell's Old Boys	1.088	124	114	55	33	36
Argentinos Juniors	1.053	120	114	40	42	38
Gimnasia y Esgrima (LP)	1.035	118	114	43	36	39
Deportivo Español	1.026	117	114	40	46	31
Rosario Central	1.026	117	114	40	34	43
Vélez Sársfield	1.018	116	114	41	33	42
Estudiantes (LP)	0.947	108	114	32	43	34
Unión	0.947	36	38	N/A	N/A	36
Platense	0.939	107	114	38	33	36
Talleres (C)	0.939	107	114	27	44	36
Deportivo Mandiyú	0.908	69	76	N/A	33	36
Ferro Carril Oeste	0.895	102	114	33	30	39
Chaco For Ever	0.842	32	38	N/A	N/A	32
Racing (C)	0.842	96	114	31	33	32
Instituto	0.719	82	114	33	23	26

=== Relegation playoff ===
1990
Relegation playoff

Chaco For Ever	5–0	Racing (C)

La Bombonera, Buenos Aires

== Argentine clubs in international competitions ==
Team	Recopa 1989	Supercopa 1989	Copa Libertadores 1990
Boca Juniors	Champions	Champions	did not qualify
Independiente	N/A	Runner up	QF
River Plate	N/A	Round 1	SF
Argentinos Juniors	N/A	SF	did not qualify
Estudiantes	N/A	QF	did not qualify
Racing Club	N/A	QF	did not qualify
