= Ricardo Lunari =

Argentine footballer & manager (born 1970)

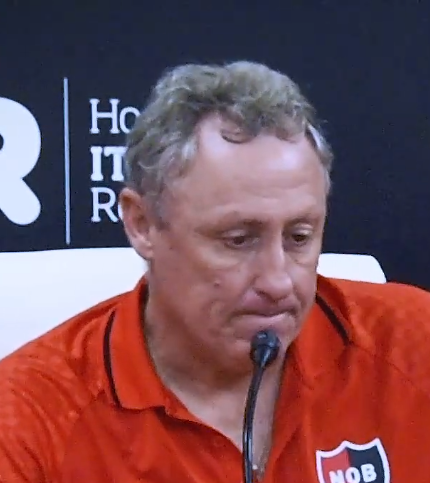
- Lunari in 2024

Personal information
- Full name: Ricardo Gabriel Lunari Del Federico
- Date of birth: 6 February 1970 (age 56)
- Place of birth: San José de La Esquina, Argentina
- Height: 1.79 m (5 ft 10 in)
- Position: Midfielder

Youth career
- 1983–1990: Newell's Old Boys

Senior career*
Years	Team	Apps	(Gls)
1991–1992	Newell's Old Boys	42	(8)
1993–1995	Universidad Católica	32	(20)
1994	→ Atlas (loan)	21	(6)
1995	Puebla	14	(1)
1996	Millonarios	30	(10)
1996–1998	Universidad Católica	48	(17)
1998–1999	Salamanca	12	(0)
2000	Farense	14	(2)
2000–2001	Almagro	8	(0)
2001–2002	Oriente Petrolero	32	(8)
2002	Estudiantes de Mérida	7	(1)
2003	Centenario		
2003–2005	Guspini Calcio		

Managerial career
- 2008: Guabirá
- 2008: Newell's Old Boys (assistant)
- 2009–2010: Chacarita Juniors (assistant)
- 2010: Veracruz (assistant)
- 2010–2011: Colón (assistant)
- 2012: Santiago Morning
- 2013: Deportes Valdivia
- 2013–2014: Newell's Old Boys (reserves)
- 2014: Newell's Old Boys
- 2014–2015: Millonarios
- 2016: Deportes Valdivia
- 2017: Blooming
- 2019: Colón FC
- 2021–2022: Provincial Osorno
- 2023–2024: Newell's Old Boys (youth)
- 2024: Newell's Old Boys (interim)
- * Club domestic league appearances and goals

Ricardo Gabriel Lunari Del Federico (born 6 February 1970) is an Argentine football manager and former player.

== Playing career ==
Lunari started his career in 1991 with Newell's Old Boys in Argentina, he was a young member of two championship winning teams before moving to Chile in 1993 to play for Universidad Católica.

In his first season with UC he was part of the team that reached the final of the Copa Libertadores. He then had short spells with Atlas and Puebla in Mexico and Millonarios in Colombia before returning to UC in 1996. In 1997 the club won the National Championship. He scored the last goal in the 3–0 final match against Colo-Colo.

In 1998, he joined Spanish club Salamanca in La Liga, before moving to Portugal to play for Farense.

In 2000 Lunari returned to Argentina to play for Almagro. Towards the end of his career he played for Oriente Petrolero in Bolivia Estudiantes de Mérida in Venezuela and amateur side Guspini in Italy.

== Coaching career ==
After retiring as a player Lunari took his coaching qualifications. He is a level 1 qualified coach in Italy, and obtained his international coaching licence in England. In March 2008, Lunari made his coaching debut with Bolivian first division club Guabirá, but after only five games into the season he resigned from his duties due to poor team performance. He later joined Fernando Gamboa as his assistant coach when he took over Newell's Old Boys in August 2008.

On 18 January 2019, Lunari was appointed as the manager of Colón FC from Montevideo, Uruguay.

From 2021 to 2022, he was in charge of Provincial Osorno in the Chilean Tercera A.

== Honours ==
Newell's Old Boys

- Argentine Primera División: 1990–91
- Argentine Clausura Tournament: Clausura 1992
- Copa Libertadores runners-up: 1992

Universidad Católica

- Primera División de Chile: 1997 Apertura
- Copa Libertadores runners-up: 1993

Oriente Petrolero

- Liga de Fútbol Profesional Boliviano: 2001
