= Víctor Ramos (footballer, born 1958) =

Argentine footballer

Personal information
- Full name: Víctor Rogelio Ramos
- Date of birth: 4 September 1958 (age 68)
- Place of birth: Rosario, Argentina
- Height: 1.70 m (5 ft 7 in)
- Position: Striker

Senior career*
Years	Team	Apps	(Gls)
1978–1984	Newell's Old Boys	252	(167)
1984–1985	Nantes	24	(18)
1985–1987	Toulon	67	(48)
1987–1989	Newell's Old Boys		
1989–1990	Nueva Chicago		
1990–1991	Unión de Santa Fe	33	(22)

International career
1983	Argentina	10	(3)
- * Club domestic league appearances and goals as of 21 November 2007

Víctor Rogelio Ramos (born 4 September 1958 in Rosario) is an Argentine former football striker. He played club football in Argentina and France and represented the Argentina national football team. He spent the majority of his career with Newell's Old Boys, where he holds the record as the club's top scorer with 167 goals.

Ramos started his professional career in 1978 with Newell's, he soon established himself as a first team player, scoring his first goal for the club on July 8, 1979, against Huracán. He went on to score 167 goals for the club including 30 in Metropolitano 1983, to become the leagues topscorer.

Ramos was included in the Argentina squad for Copa América 1983. He played a total of 10 games for his country, scoring 3 goal.

In 1985 Ramos moved to France where he played for Nantes and Toulon before returning to Argentina in 1987.

Ramos was part of the Newell's Old Boys team that won the 1987–88 championship. He continued playing for the club until 1989.

In the latter years of his playing career Ramos played for Nueva Chicago and Unión de Santa Fe, retiring in 1991.

== Honours ==
FC Nantes

- Ligue 1 runner-up: 1984-85

Newell's Old Boys

- Primera División Argentina: 1987–88
- Copa Libertadores runner-up: 1988
