= Ernesto Toledo =

Argentine professional footballer

Personal information
- Date of birth: 4 March 1996 (age 30)
- Place of birth: Argentina
- Height: 1.72 m (5 ft 8 in)
- Position: Left-back

Team information
- Current team: Deportivo Español

Senior career*
Years	Team	Apps	(Gls)
2017–	Deportivo Español	55	(0)
- * Club domestic league appearances and goals as of 07:24, 24 May 2019 (UTC)

Ernesto Toledo (born 4 March 1996) is an Argentine professional footballer who plays as a left-back for Deportivo Español.

== Career ==
Toledo made the breakthrough into senior football with Deportivo Español during the 2016–17 Primera B Metropolitana, making his senior debut on 11 March 2017 during an away loss to Defensores de Belgrano; he appeared eighteen more times that season, as they were eliminated from the promotion play-offs by Deportivo Riestra. He also received a red card in 2016–17, as he also did in the succeeding 2017–18 campaign as he featured in twenty-nine Primera B Metropolitana fixtures.

== Career statistics ==
As of 24 May 2019.

Appearances and goals by club, season and competition
Club	Season	League			Cup		League Cup		Continental		Other		Total	
Club	Season	Division	Apps	Goals	Apps	Goals	Apps	Goals	Apps	Goals	Apps	Goals	Apps	Goals
Deportivo Español	2016–17	Primera B Metropolitana	16	0	0	0	—		—		3 (Note: Appearance(s) in the Primera B Metropolitana play-offs)	0	19	0
Deportivo Español	2017–18	Primera B Metropolitana	29	0	0	0	—		—		0	0	29	0
Deportivo Español	2018–19	Primera B Metropolitana	10	0	0	0	—		—		0	0	10	0
Career total			55	0	0	0	—		—		3	0	58	0
