= Matías Gómez =

Matías Gómez may refer to:

- Matías Gómez (footballer, born 1995), Argentine defender
- Matías Gómez (footballer, born 1998), Argentine forward
