= Pablo Torresagasti =

Argentine footballer (born 1980)

Personal information
- Full name: Pablo Andrés Torresagasti
- Date of birth: 5 August 1980 (age 46)
- Place of birth: Resistencia, Argentina
- Height: 1.90 m (6 ft 3 in)
- Position: Goalkeeper

Youth career
- Rosario Central

Senior career*
Years	Team	Apps	(Gls)
2002	12 de Octubre	0	(0)
2003	Tembetary	–	(–)
2004	Sport Colombia	0	(0)
2004–2005	Textil Mandiyú	19	(0)
2005	Sportivo Patria	17	(0)
2006	Deportes Concepción	0	(0)
2006–2011	Boca Unidos	90	(0)
2011–2012	Racing de Olavarría	30	(0)
2012–2013	Defensores de Belgrano	3	(0)
2013	Atlético Laguna Blanca	–	(–)
2013	Sportivo Carapeguá	20	(0)
2014–2015	Libertad	31	(0)
2016	Rionegro Águilas	40	(0)
2017	Rubio Ñu	32	(0)
2018	Racing Montevideo	13	(0)
2018–2019	Sarmiento de Resistencia	1	(0)
2021	Villa Alvear	–	(–)
2022–2023	Central Norte Argentino	–	(–)
2023–2024	Regional	3	(0)
- * Club domestic league appearances and goals

Pablo Andrés Torresagasti (born August 5, 1980, in Resistencia, Argentina) is an Argentine former football player who played as a goalkeeper for clubs in his homeland, Paraguay, Chile, Israel, Colombia and Uruguay.

== Teams ==
- (Paraguay) 12 de Octubre 2002
- (Paraguay) Tembetary 2003
- (Paraguay) Sport Colombia 2004
- (Argentina) Textil Mandiyú 2004–2005
- (Argentina) Sportivo Patria 2005
- (Chile) Deportes Concepción 2006
- (Argentina) Boca Unidos 2006–2011
- (Argentina) Racing de Olavarría 2011–2012
- (Argentina) Defensores de Belgrano 2012–2013
- (Argentina) Atlético Laguna Blanca 2013
- (Paraguay) Sportivo Carapeguá 2013
- (Paraguay) Libertad 2014–2015
- (Colombia) Rionegro Águilas 2016
- (Paraguay) Rubio Ñu 2017
- (Uruguay) Racing Club de Montevideo 2018
- (Argentina) Sarmiento de Resistencia 2018–2019
- (Argentina) Villa Alvear 2021
- (Argentina) Central Norte Argentino 2022–2023
- (Argentina) Regional 2023–2024
