= 1990–91 in Argentine football =

Football in Argentina
- Season: 1990–91

The 1990–91 season saw the introduction of the Apertura and Clausura system in Argentina. Newell's Old Boys won the Apertura 1990 and Boca Juniors won the Clausura 1991. The two teams faced each other in a playoff to decide the overall champions, which was won by Newell's. There was a great deal of controversy over this as Boca Juniors had won the Clausura without losing a game, but losing the playoff had cost them their first official championship since 1981. In subsequent seasons the winners of both the Apertura and Clausura have been officially recognised as champions.

== Torneo Apertura ("Opening" Tournament) ==
Position	Team	Points	Played	Won	Drawn	Lost	For	Against	Difference
1	Newell's Old Boys	28	19	11	6	2	30	13	17
2	River Plate	26	19	11	4	4	29	13	16
3	Vélez Sársfield	24	19	8	8	3	27	18	9
4	Argentinos Juniors	23	19	9	5	5	25	17	8
5	Rosario Central	23	19	9	5	5	26	21	5
6	Ferro Carril Oeste	23	19	7	9	3	19	16	3
7	Estudiantes de La Plata	20	19	6	8	5	17	17	0
8	Boca Juniors	19	19	6	7	6	18	16	2
9	Huracán	19	19	5	9	5	20	19	1
10	Independiente	18	19	6	6	7	21	22	-1
11	San Lorenzo	18	19	4	10	5	15	18	-3
12	Talleres de Córdoba	18	19	7	4	8	23	27	-4
13	Racing Club	17	19	2	13	4	19	21	-2
14	Gimnasia de La Plata	16	19	2	12	5	15	20	-5
15	Platense	16	19	5	6	8	16	22	-6
16	Chaco For Ever	16	19	6	4	9	19	28	-9
17	Mandiyú	15	19	4	7	8	17	21	-4
18	Deportivo Español	14	19	4	6	9	18	24	-6
19	Unión de Santa Fe	13	19	4	5	10	21	28	-7
20	Lanús	11	19	3	5	11	11	27	-16

Newell's Old Boys to play in the championship decider
Teams highlighted in blue qualified for the Liguilla Pre-Libertadores

=== Relegation ===
There is no relegation after the Apertura. For the relegation results of this tournament see below

== Torneo Clausura ("Closing" Tournament) ==
Position	Team	Points	Played	Won	Drawn	Lost	For	Against	Difference
1	Boca Juniors	32	19	13	6	0	32	6	26
2	San Lorenzo	27	19	11	5	3	29	18	11
3	Mandiyú	23	19	8	7	4	20	13	7
4	Racing Club	23	19	9	5	5	23	22	1
5	Independiente	22	19	6	10	3	22	15	7
6	Vélez Sársfield	21	19	7	7	5	25	22	3
7	Huracán	21	19	7	7	5	16	16	0
8	Newell's Old Boys	20	19	6	8	5	21	14	7
9	Estudiantes de La Plata	19	19	6	7	6	18	15	3
10	River Plate	19	19	4	11	4	19	19	0
11	Platense	19	19	5	9	5	11	16	-5
12	Lanús	18	19	5	8	6	15	16	-1
13	Unión de Santa Fe	18	19	3	12	4	21	26	-5
14	Gimnasia de La Plata	17	19	4	9	6	16	22	-6
15	Rosario Central	16	19	4	8	7	15	23	-8
16	Ferro Carril Oeste	15	19	2	11	6	15	20	-5
17	Deportivo Español	14	19	4	6	9	22	25	-3
18	Argentinos Juniors	13	19	3	7	9	19	30	-11
19	Chaco For Ever	12	19	1	10	8	15	26	-11
20	Talleres de Córdoba	11	19	4	3	12	24	34	-10

Boca Juniors to play in the championship decider
Teams highlighted in blue qualified for the Liguilla Pre-Libertadores

== Championship decider ==
		1st Leg	2nd leg	Aggregate	Penalty shootout
Newell's Old Boys	Boca Juniors	1–0	0–1	1–1	3–1

- Newell's Old Boys win the 1990–1991 championship and qualify for the Copa Libertadores 1992.
- Boca Juniors enter the Liguilla Pre-Libertadores.

== Top Scorer ==
The top scorer over the combined championships was Esteban González of Vélez Sársfield, with 18 goals.

== Relegation ==
Team	Average	Points	Played	1988–89	1989–90	1990–1991
Boca Juniors	1.254	143	114	49	43	51
River Plate	1.254	143	114	45	53	45
Independiente	1.237	141	114	55	46	40
San Lorenzo	1.070	122	114	42	35	45
Racing Club	1.061	121	114	42	39	40
Vélez Sársfield	1.053	120	114	33	42	45
Huracán	1.053	40	38	N/A	N/A	40
Newell's Old Boys	1.044	119	114	35	36	48
Rosario Central	1.035	118	114	36	43	39
Argentinos Juniors	1.018	116	114	42	38	36
Estudiantes de La Plata	1.009	115	114	42	34	39
Talleres de Córdoba	0.956	109	114	44	36	29
Gimnasia de La Plata	0.947	108	114	36	39	33
Ferro Carril Oeste	0.939	107	114	30	39	38
Mandiyú	0.939	107	114	33	36	38
Deportivo Español	0.921	105	114	46	31	28
Platense	0.912	104	114	33	36	35
Unión de Santa Fe	0.882	67	76	N/A	36	31
Chaco For Ever	0.789	60	76	N/A	32	28
Lanús	0.763	29	38	N/A	N/A	29

== Liguilla Pre-Libertadores ==
Teams highlighted in light blue, in the league tables above qualified for the Liguilla Pre-Libertadores.

Quarter-finals

Home (1st leg)	Home (2nd leg)	1st Leg	2nd leg	Aggregate
Independiente	San Lorenzo	1–1	1–2	2–3
River Plate	Mandiyú	2–0	2–0	4–0
Velez Sarsfield	Racing Club	3–0	1–5	4–5
Boca Juniors	Argentinos Juniors	0–1	2–0	2–1

Semi-finals

Home (1st leg)	Home (2nd leg)	1st Leg	2nd leg	Aggregate
Boca Juniors	Racing Club	1–1	0–0	1–1 (4-2pk)
River Plate	San Lorenzo	0–0	0–0	0–0 (1-4pk)

Final

Home (1st leg)	Home (2nd leg)	1st Leg	2nd leg	Aggregate
San Lorenzo	Boca Juniors	1–0	1–0	2–0

- San Lorenzo qualify for the Copa Libertadores 1992.

== Argentine clubs in international competitions ==
Team	Supercopa 1990	Copa Libertadores 1991
Boca Juniors	QF	SF
Estudiantes de La Plata	SF	did not qualify
Argentinos Juniors	QF	did not qualify
Racing Club	QF	did not qualify
River Plate	Round 1	Round 1
Independiente	Round 1	did not qualify
