= Matías Gómez (footballer, born 1995) =

Argentine footballer

Personal information
- Full name: Matías Ezequiel Vicente Gómez
- Date of birth: 25 June 1995 (age 31)
- Place of birth: Argentina
- Position: Defender

Youth career
- 2005–2013: Almirante Brown

Senior career*
Years	Team	Apps	(Gls)
2013–2017	Almirante Brown	4	(0)
2017–2019	Deportivo Español	4	(0)
- * Club domestic league appearances and goals

Matías Ezequiel Vicente Gómez (born 25 June 1995) is an Argentine professional footballer who plays as a defender.

== Career ==
Gómez began his career with Almirante Brown, joining the club in 2005. He made his professional debut on 25 October 2016 during a home victory over Estudiantes in Primera B Metropolitana; Gómez had previously been an unused substitute once during a 2012–13 Primera B Nacional fixture versus Patronato. He made three further appearances for Almirante Brown, prior to departing at the end of the 2016–17 campaign to join fellow third tier side Deportivo Español. After four appearances in two seasons, Gómez was released in June 2019.

== Career statistics ==
As of 16 October 2020.

Club statistics
Club	Season	League			Cup		League Cup		Continental		Other		Total	
Club	Season	Division	Apps	Goals	Apps	Goals	Apps	Goals	Apps	Goals	Apps	Goals	Apps	Goals
Almirante Brown	2012–13	Primera B Nacional	0	0	0	0	—		—		0	0	0	0
Almirante Brown	2013–14	Primera B Nacional	0	0	0	0	—		—		0	0	0	0
Almirante Brown	2014	Primera B Metropolitana	0	0	0	0	—		—		0	0	0	0
Almirante Brown	2015	Primera B Metropolitana	0	0	0	0	—		—		0	0	0	0
Almirante Brown	2016	Primera B Metropolitana	0	0	0	0	—		—		0	0	0	0
Almirante Brown	2016–17	Primera B Metropolitana	4	0	0	0	—		—		0	0	4	0
Almirante Brown	Total		4	0	0	0	—		—		0	0	4	0
Deportivo Español	2017–18	Primera B Metropolitana	2	0	0	0	—		—		0	0	2	0
Deportivo Español	2018–19	Primera B Metropolitana	2	0	0	0	—		—		0	0	2	0
Deportivo Español	Total		4	0	0	0	—		—		0	0	4	0
Career total			8	0	0	0	—		—		0	0	8	0
