= 1987–88 Argentine Primera División =

97th season of top-tier football league in Argentina

Primera División
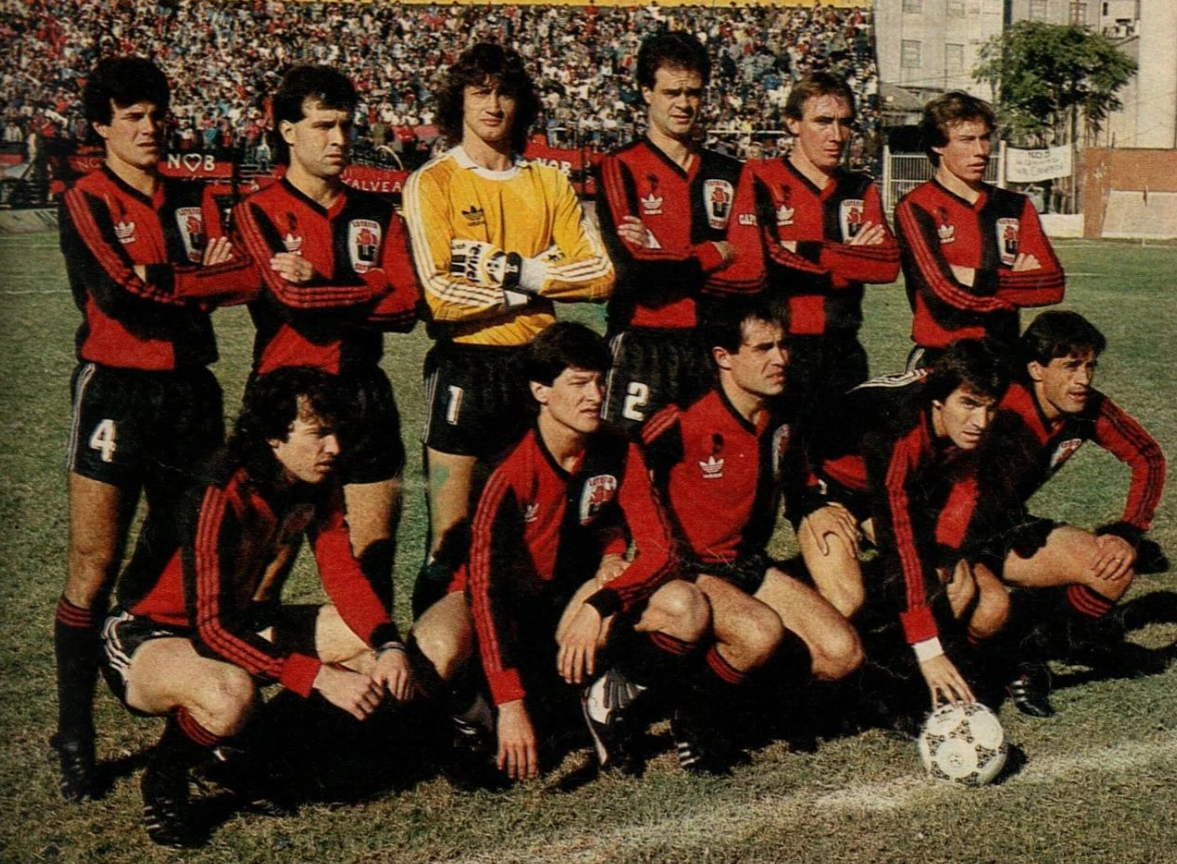
- Newell's Old Boys, champions
- Season: 1987–88
- Dates: August 30, 1987 – June 5, 1988
- Champions: Newell's Old Boys (2nd title)
- Promoted: Dep. Armenio; Banfield
- Relegated: Banfield; Unión SF
- 1988 Copa Libertadores: Newell's Old Boys; San Lorenzo
- Top goalscorer: (Argentina) José Luis Rodríguez (18)

The 1987–88 Argentine Primera División was the 97th season of top-flight football in Argentina. The season ran from August 30, 1987 to June 5, 1988.

Newell's Old Boys won its 2nd league title, with a squad and coaching staff made up entirely of players from the club's academy, while Banfield and Unión de Santa Fe were relegated.

== League standings ==
| Pos | Team | Pld | W | D | L | GF | GA | GD | Pts | Qualification |
|---|---|---|---|---|---|---|---|---|---|---|
| 1 | Newell's Old Boys (C) | 38 | 21 | 13 | 4 | 68 | 22 | +46 | 55 | Qualified for 1988 Copa Libertadores |
| 2 | San Lorenzo | 38 | 16 | 17 | 5 | 49 | 28 | +21 | 49 | Qualified for the Liguilla Pre-Libertadores |
| 3 | Racing | 38 | 15 | 18 | 5 | 51 | 33 | +18 | 48 | Qualified for the Liguilla Pre-Libertadores |
| 4 | River Plate | 38 | 17 | 12 | 9 | 51 | 40 | +11 | 46 | Qualified for the Liguilla Pre-Libertadores |
| 5 | Gimnasia y Esgrima (LP) | 38 | 11 | 21 | 6 | 44 | 36 | +8 | 43 | Qualified for the Liguilla Pre-Libertadores |
| 6 | Vélez Sársfield | 38 | 14 | 13 | 11 | 51 | 41 | +10 | 41 | Qualified for the Liguilla Pre-Libertadores |
| 7 | Rosario Central | 38 | 12 | 16 | 10 | 53 | 41 | +12 | 40 | Qualified for the Liguilla Pre-Libertadores |
| 8 | Argentinos Juniors | 38 | 15 | 10 | 13 | 49 | 44 | +5 | 40 | Qualified for the Liguilla Pre-Libertadores |
| 9 | Deportivo Español | 38 | 11 | 18 | 9 | 49 | 47 | +2 | 40 | |
| 10 | Platense | 38 | 12 | 14 | 12 | 42 | 45 | −3 | 38 | |
| 11 | Independiente | 38 | 12 | 13 | 13 | 37 | 44 | −7 | 37 | |
| 12 | Boca Juniors | 38 | 12 | 11 | 15 | 40 | 55 | −15 | 35 | |
| 13 | Deportivo Armenio | 38 | 8 | 18 | 12 | 37 | 45 | −8 | 34 | |
| 14 | Ferro Carril Oeste | 38 | 7 | 19 | 12 | 27 | 35 | −8 | 33 | |
| 15 | Instituto | 38 | 10 | 15 | 13 | 43 | 53 | −10 | 33 (Note: 2 points deducted) | |
| 16 | Estudiantes (LP) | 38 | 6 | 20 | 12 | 31 | 43 | −12 | 32 | |
| 17 | Racing (C) | 38 | 10 | 11 | 17 | 31 | 44 | −13 | 31 | |
| 18 | Unión | 38 | 8 | 12 | 18 | 39 | 52 | −13 | 28 | |
| 19 | Banfield | 38 | 7 | 14 | 17 | 36 | 56 | −20 | 28 | |
| 20 | Talleres (C) | 38 | 6 | 15 | 17 | 40 | 64 | −24 | 27 | |

(C) Champions

== Top scorers ==
| Position | Player | Team | Goals |
|---|---|---|---|
| 1 | José Luis Rodríguez | Deportivo Español | 18 |
| 2 | Marío Bevilaqua | Talleres (C) | 17 |
| 3 | José Iglesias | Racing | 16 |
| 3 | Walter Perazzo | San Lorenzo | 16 |

== Relegation ==
Unión de Santa Fe and Banfield were relegated with the worst points averages.

== Liguilla Pre-Libertadores ==
Quarter-finals

| Home (1st leg) | Home (2nd leg) | 1st Leg | 2nd leg | Aggregate |
|---|---|---|---|---|
| Argentinos Juniors | Racing | 1-1 | 1-3 | 2-4 |
| Deportivo Mandiyú | San Lorenzo | 1-1 | 1-1 | 2-2 |
| Rosario Central | River Plate | 0-0 | 0-1 | 0-1 |
| Velez Sarsfield | Gimnasia y Esgrima (LP) | 3-0 | 1-1 | 4-1 |

Semi-finals

| Home (1st leg) | Home (2nd leg) | 1st Leg | 2nd leg | Aggregate |
|---|---|---|---|---|
| River Plate | Racing | 3-3 | 0-1 | 3-4 |
| Velez Sarsfield | San Lorenzo | 0-1 | 0-0 | 0-1 |

Final

| Home (1st leg) | Home (2nd leg) | 1st Leg | 2nd leg | Aggregate |
|---|---|---|---|---|
| Racing | San Lorenzo | 0-2 | 1-0 | 1-2 |

- San Lorenzo qualify for 1988 Copa Libertadores.

== See also ==
- 1987–88 in Argentine football
