= Estadio Nueva España =

Football stadium in Buenos Aires, Argentina

Nueva España Stadium
- Estadio Nueva España
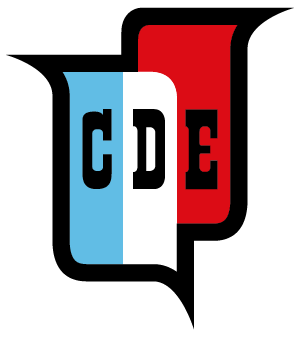

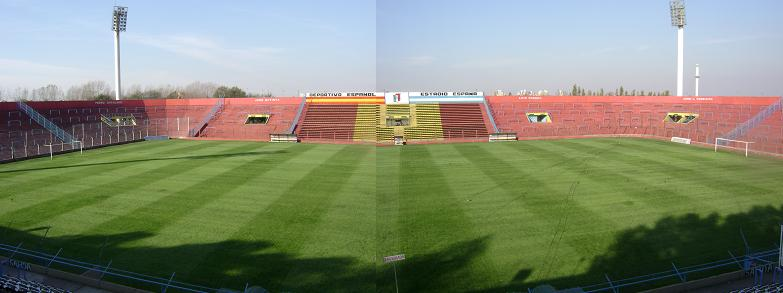
- The stadium in 2008
- Interactive map of Nueva España Stadium
- Former names: Estadio España (1981–96)
- Address: Av. Santiago de Compostela 3873; Buenos Aires; Argentina
- Owner: Deportivo Español
- Capacity: 32,500
- Type: Stadium
- Surface: Grass
- Field size: 105 x 68 m

Construction
- Opened: 12 February 1981; 45 years ago

Tenants
- Deportivo Español (1981–2003, 2007–present)

Website
- cde.com.ar/estadio-espana

Estadio Nueva España is a football stadium located in the Parque Avellaneda district of Buenos Aires, Argentina. It is owned and operated by club Deportivo Español, having been opened in 1981. The venue has a capacity of 32,500 spectators after being expanded in 1996.

== History ==
The stadium was opened on 12 February 1981 in a friendly match between Deportivo Español and Spanish club Deportivo La Coruña, won by the local team 1–0. Originally named "Estadio España", it had a capacity for 18,000 people. Entrepreneur Francisco Ríos Seoane was president of the club in those times.

After Deportivo Español promoted to Primera División in 1984 because of winning the Primera B championship, the club decided to refurbish the stadium. Nevertheless it was not until 12 October 1996 (commemorating the 40th. anniversary of club's foundation) that the stadium was reinaugurated with a match between the 1966 team, champion of Torneo Reducido and 1984 Primera B champion team. Works included the expansion of the venue (up to 32,500 spectators) and the installation of a lighting system, being renamed "Estadio Nueva España". Thus, the stadium became one of the biggest venues in the city of Buenos Aires.

During the time the stadium was remodelled, Deportivo Español played their home matches at Ferrocarril Oeste, Atlanta, Huracán, San Lorenzo, and Vélez Sarsfield, among others.

In 1999 a court declared Deportivo Español bankrupt. As a result, the club facilities (included the stadium) where closed in 2003. This caused the football team moved to different venues such as All Boys, Ferro Carril Oeste, and Comunicaciones. By 2007 the stadium was abandoned and severely deteriorated.

After a long court process, the Government of Buenos Aires (GCBA) through "Corporación Buenos Aires Sur", acquired the club facilities in an auction, then ceding Deportivo Español the usufruct of the stadium. The venue was refurbished by the GCBA with a help from club members. When Mauricio Macri was elected Chief of Government of Buenos Aires in 2007, the city expropriated almost half of Deportivo Español facilities, but the stadium continued under possession of the club.

== See also ==
- List of football stadiums in Argentina
- Lists of stadiums
