= José Luis Rodríguez (footballer, born 1963) =

Argentine footballer

Personal information
- Full name: José Luis Rodríguez
- Date of birth: July 21, 1963 (age 63)
- Place of birth: Buenos Aires, Argentina
- Position: Centre-forward

Senior career*
| Years | Team | Apps | (Gls) |
| 1984–1989 | Deportivo Español | ? | (54) |
| 1989–1991 | Real Betis | 57 | (10) |
| 1991–1992 | Deportivo Español | 42 | (9) |
| 1992–1994 | Rosario Central | 45 | (18) |
| 1994–1995 | Racing Club | 17 | (2) |
| 1995–1996 | Olimpo | - | |
| 1996 | Deportivo Cuenca | ? | (18) |
| 1997 | Olimpo | - | |
- * Club domestic league appearances and goals as of 20 November 2007

José Luis Rodríguez (born July 21, 1963, in Buenos Aires) is an Argentine former footballer who played as a centre-forward. He played for a number of clubs in Argentina, Spain and Ecuador.

Rodríguez, nicknamed El Puma after the singer of the same name, started his professional career in 1984 with Deportivo Español, he went on to become one of the club's all-time best, scoring 63 goals and becoming the top scorer in the Argentine Primera in the 1987–1988 season.

He had a signed contract in Spain with Real Betis before returning to Argentina where he played for Deportivo Español again. then Rosario Central, Racing Club and Olimpo. In 1996, he also signed a contract with Deportivo Cuenca in Ecuador.

== Titles ==
| Season | Team | Title |
|---|---|---|
| 1984 | Deportivo Español | Primera B |
