= Esteban González (footballer, born 1962) =

Argentine footballer

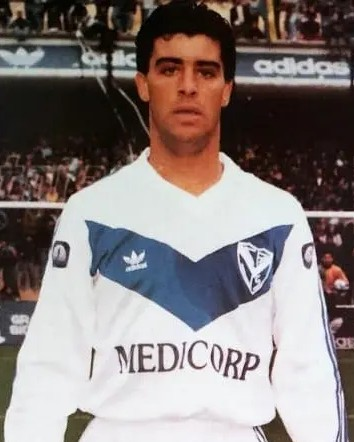

Personal information
- Full name: Esteban Fernando González Sánchez
- Date of birth: January 14, 1962 (age 64)
- Place of birth: Buenos Aires, Argentina
- Position: Striker

Senior career*
Years	Team	Apps	(Gls)
1982–1987	Ferro Carril Oeste	?	(43)
1987–1988	Deportivo Español	-	
1988–1989	Málaga	12	(3)
1990–1994	Vélez Sársfield	50	(19)
1995–1996	San Lorenzo	57	(20)
1996–1997	Quilmes	-	

International career
?	Argentina	-	
- * Club domestic league appearances and goals as of October 2007

Esteban Fernando González Sánchez (born January 14, 1962) is a former Argentine footballer who played as a striker. He was a winner of the Argentine league with three different teams and he also played for the Argentina national team.

González started his professional career in 1982 with Ferro Carril Oeste, he won two Nacional championships with the club in 1982 and 1984. González was in a near fatal car crash in 1984, suffering a dislocated hip, fractured skull and multiple broken bones, putting his playing career in doubt. Despite the severity of his injuries he returned to fitness and continued his career with Ferro, he left the club in 1987 to join Deportivo Español.

In 1988, he moved to Spain to play for Málaga but returned to Argentina after only one season to join Vélez Sársfield. In his second season with Velez, he scored 18 goals to become the topscorer in the Argentine Primera. González helped Velez to win the Clausura 1993, which was their first league title in 25 years. Velez then went on to win the Copa Libertadores in 1994.

In 1994 González joined San Lorenzo de Almagro, he was part of their championship winning squad in the Clausura 1995. He then stepped down a division to play for Quilmes in the Argentine 2nd division until he retired.

Following his retirement González had a spell as assistant manager to Oscar Ruggeri at San Lorenzo, before becoming a players agent. In 2006, he took part in a Reality TV singing competition.

== Titles ==
Season	Team	Title
Nacional 1982	Ferro Carril Oeste	Primera División Argentina
Nacional 1984	Ferro Carril Oeste	Primera División Argentina
Clausura 1993	Vélez Sársfield	Primera División Argentina
1994	Vélez Sársfield	Copa Libertadores
Clausura 1995	San Lorenzo	Primera División Argentina
