= Juan Comas =

Spanish-Mexican anthropologist

Juan Comas Camps (January 23, 1900 in Alayor, Menorca, Spain – January 18, 1979 in Mexico City, Mexico) was a Spanish-Mexican anthropologist, notable for his critical work on race, and his participation in drafting the UNESCO statement on race. He fled Spain during the regime of Franco, and spent the rest of his life in Mexico. He was a professor of physical anthropology at the National Institute of Anthropology and History in Mexico between 1940 and 1943, and at the National Autonomous University of Mexico from 1955 until his death.

== Early life ==
Comas was born in the small town of Alayor, Spain, located in the center of the Menorca Island in the Mediterranean Sea, 150 miles southeast of Barcelona.

During this time, Spain was facing social and political changes that would shape his later work. His father was a teacher in Menorca, and Juan Comas followed in his steps. At the age of seventeen, he received degrees in Arts and Sciences and title of elementary teacher. Four years later, Comas received one of the highest degrees for instructors in the Escuela Superior del Magisterio de Madrid (Rex, 1980). With his academic achievements, Juan Comas taught throughout Spain, before receiving several pedagogical degrees from prestigious universities in the country.

The academic achievements by Comas were not overlooked by the Spanish state. The Consejo Superior de Investigaciones Científicas (The High Counsel of Scientific Investigation) of Spain sent him to Geneva to study at the Institute J.J. Rousseau of Geneva, and perform psycho-pedagogical studies. During his time in Geneva, Comas absorbed the teaching of styles from the rest of Europe, and would later bring back with him to Spain.

It was at this institute that Juan Comas began his studies in anthropology. After publishing several articles, and working for the Republicans in Spain, Juan Comas completed his dissertation and defended in 1939. In 1942, under the guidance of Eugène Pittard, Juan Comas received his Doctoral degree in the Anthropological Sciences. Working under Pittard, Comas received much of his indoctrination into the discipline of anthropology, and more specifically, the subfield of physical anthropology. Pittard was a Swiss anthropologist who had performed numerous investigations and published work in topics covering the evolution and origin of humans, as well as the races of people. In an act of great affection to his mentor, Juan Comas translated Pittard's book, The Races and History, close to thirty years after being published. In 1899 Pittard received his Doctoral of Sciences, by presenting his dissertation titled "Recherche d’anatomie comparative sur diverses séries de crânes anciens de la vallée du Rhône (Valais)" (Comparative Anatomical Research on a diverse series of ancient crania in the Rhone Valley). As Comas was in his later life, Pittard was very involved in political activism. He published articles on the malnutrition of Albanians and the maltreatment of Gypsy populations throughout Europe. It was these times under Pittard that Comas began to develop his ideas that, along with the social atmosphere of the time, would later help him form his personal indigenismo.

After the Spanish Civil War, Comas was exiled from Spain, when the government came under the Franco regime. Throughout the 1930s, Comas helped the Republicans fight against the Nationals, but the conservatives took had won the war. Numerous scientists were forced to leave the country under the rule of Franco (Romero Salvadó, 2005). He implemented in his students, for however brief, a new way of observing the world through science (Rex, 1980). To those he taught Comas became a great symbol: what the modern, Spanish professor was supposed to be. In contrast to the professor at the beginning of the century, exemplified by his father, one who never delved into national politics, Comas embodied the individual as professor who was supposed to change the course of the nation for the better through political intervention in his teachings.

== Historical and physical anthropology’s disciplinary atmosphere: 1900–1950 ==
From his birth up until he left Spain, the country experienced several social and political changes that shaped Juan Comas one way or another. The anarchist movement that began in the latter half of the 19th century saw Spain's workers perform massive strikes against the institutional monarchy, whose power was decreasing after the defeat in the Spanish–American and Cuban wars of 1898 (Vincent, 2007). During this period, up until 1931, Spain attempted to create an imagined Nationalist identity of its citizens. According to Vincent (2007:81), the Spanish state exercised jingoism, extreme patriotism through foreign policy. These endeavors were seen in universal manhood suffrage, the dedication of bullfights for a patriotic cause, and the repatriation of resources from its colonies. These actions of nationalism opened Comas’ eyes to how injustices, prejudices, and racial inequality could be constructed. These actions helped him form his beliefs later in life.

These social events, occurring early in the 20th century in Spain up until the end of World War I, allowed Comas to found his later beliefs, demonstrating the manner in which individual race and ethnicity were constructed in face of large-social structures such as nations. Comas was uneasy during this time period (Rex, 1980). While working in Geneva, the government assigned him as the delegate confronting the issues of children who became orphaned during the war, 1936–1939. His last position in Spain was as the director of elementary teachings for orphaned children. Not able to cope with the atrocities, Comas—as the story is told (Rex 1980)—packed his belongings into a backpack and crossed the Spanish–French border, where he made his way to Mexico. The carnage-filled sights that he experienced in Spain allowed him to foster his legacy beyond his academics (Rex, 1980). He was known for his compassion and the way in which he fought for social justice, criticizing the government and attempting to ameliorate injustices by declaring equality among all human beings and debunking institutionalized prejudices and racism.

During this period Comas published several articles. Much of the literature he published correlated to his earlier work in pedagogy. With it he was able to bring back to Spain different styles that were current in Europe, and which helped him be placed in the position of director of elementary teaching. Furthermore, once he left Spain and the Franco Regime, this period allowed Comas to establish his criticism of the government (Comas and Genovés, 1959). He often criticized the Franco Regime for the lack of true freedom in scientific inquiry. One of Comas’ harshest critiques to the Franco Regime was the way in which the state abused the discipline of anthropology to espouse state-sponsored propaganda. Comas argued that the Franco Regime was attempting to get rid of evolutionary teachings and the understandings of the origin of men. This censure would allow the state to promote its pro-religious agenda (Romero Salvadó, 2005). The fact that the Spanish state under Franco attempted to get rid of teaching of evolution did not sit well with Comas. Comas used such oppression to fuel his work.

In addition, the field of anthropology, specifically the discipline of physical anthropology, was changing during the same time period. The colonial enterprise was coming to a close, and new developments in paleontology, geology, and anthropology began to have effects on the science of anthropology (Comas, 1960). Such new outlooks into scientific research allowed a sea change in the discipline that moved away from the old racial classifications that had been established in the 19th century (Spencer, 1986). According to Spencer (1986) the advances in science allowed the ideas of race and inferiority to diminish within the discipline. This happened in two ways. The first was the creation of the synthetic theory by geneticists after World War II. The second way was the manner in which physical anthropology applied the new synthesis to study the concepts of population and adaptational thinking, rather than the old concepts of race. These changes occurring in the first half of the 20th century, greatly formed the work of Comas, who himself was an ardent fighter against racism.

Comas’ work attempted to destroy the concepts of race and the foundations of racism in physical anthropology. Comas (1961) argued that the concept of race had no scientific merit or backing. Comas even went as far as to categorize work that others deemed scientific as "super-racist" when old concepts of racial categorization were utilized. Such work provided no "scientific" proof for arguing one human group superior to another (Comas, 1961). He attacked such work as amoral, because it misled non-informed readers to believe concepts that were untrue, as well as allowed the continuation of prejudice in that these scientists believed in. Comas believed that the work, and obligation, of scientists was to demonstrate the truth, an argument expanded below.

== Juan Comas in Mexico ==
Juan Comas arrived in Mexico in 1940 with well established credentials. He began teaching at the Escuela Normal de Maestros in Pachuca, Mexico. In 1938, a couple of years before arriving in Mexico, the Escuela Nacional de Antropología e Historia (or ENAH, National School of Anthropology and History) opened. Within a couple of years after arriving in the country, the ENAH invited him to be part of its faculty. This school has been one of the leading researching institutions in all of the Americas, and Comas took advantage of the already well-known collections that the school—which shared the building with the National Museum of Anthropology, before the museum itself moved to its current location—had. He was able to carry out his first works thanks in large part to these collections (Romano Pacheco, 1980). These two institutions—the ENAH and the National Museum—shared the same building until 1964 when the new National Museum opened.

One example of Comas' work in Mexico is in regards to Amerindians and how racial ideology attempted to make this population—from Canada to Argentina—not only homogeneous, but as well as primitive in regards to other populations around the world. Comas (1942) presents numerous studies which show how diverse the indigenous population of the American continent truly is, and should not be lumped together as earlier studies had done. Because it was believed that blood type was similar between the Amerindian populations, many authors argued that this was due to racial inferiority. In this article, Comas (1942) shows the different percentages of blood types in the population, and how an argument on blood truly does not carry weight in defining a population primitive. Blood and blood types were not basis for defining any group inferior.

== Latin American Anthropology ==
The discipline of anthropology is viewed and exercised much different in Latin America from that of its North American counterpart. This has much to do with the history of the North v. South. The discipline began in the North when the colonial expansion was at its highest in the mid-nineteenth century, and used anthropology, a nascent discipline, to carry out its projects (Medina Hernández 2004). In the process of colonization and globalization, the discipline began to spread onto the North's holdings. The South has developed the discipline in a much different way, sometimes in the shadow of the North, believed to be dependent on the North, and seen as "amateurish" by the North (Medina Hernández 2004). In the face of these foundations, anthropology in Latin America has created a more activist perception to practice the discipline. Experiencing social injustices everyday, anthropologists have created theoretical perspectives in Latin America that hold the idea that the anthropologist must fight the institution in place that is causing inequality, and protect the population that the anthropologist is studying (see Politis 2003). Comas fell into such category.

In this light we see the work of Comas during the mid-twentieth century. Comas (1950) argued that the job of anthropology is to teach the origin of man throughout the American continent. The discipline, he argued, was necessary and indispensable to any subject matter taught at the university level. Comas saw anthropology (all of its subfields) as "the solution of the social and economic problems of the different countries" (1950:567). However, he knew that the governmental structures present usually do not allow the implementation of these solutions, and when they did, they were not done under the guidance, according to Comas, of well-trained anthropologists. He saw anthropology as a way to perform social activism—a way to ameliorate the situation in which much of the rural citizenry were living. His work showed that even within Mexico things like medicine availability could improve with the work of anthropologists. He called for anthropologist to make the situation better to those they knew were suffering.

Another way in which Comas utilized anthropology as a political tool was in his published work on race and racism. As mentioned above, the history of Spain left him with a bad impression on how social structures created individuals and exploited them. In his work commissioned by UNESCO, Racial Myths, Comas (1953) brings to light the history of race and how past societies attempted to define humans who looked different as inferior. Comparing past injustices to the present maltreatments he saw, Comas argued that though physiological differences exist between groups of people, this has no scientific basis to declare any individual superior or inferior (Comas, 1953). Furthermore, he proposed the use of democratic political systems to justify the equality of individuals. He declared that democracies, a political belief that contrasted the totalitarian regime in Spain, showed the truths of how truly equal all people were. To him, nationalist agendas and totalitarian regimes repressed populations that did not fit into an imagined view.

To highlight a final example of Comas' activist persona, and how he believed activism should be used alongside anthropology, is his work with indigenous populations throughout Latin America. This was one of his lasting legacies: his work on indigenismo. Indigenismo is the belief that social scientists, such as anthropologists, should be fighters for the causes of the populations they studied. In the American continent, this refers to the indigenous populations that have often been marginalized by the colonial powers and the new modern nation-states. Comas, along with few other anthropologists of the times, founded this movement that showed argued anti-racist and end to biases within the continent. Comas fought for the inalienable social rights of numerous native populations throughout the Americas (Aguirre Beltrán, 1980). Comas fought against racism and essential definitions that characterized these populations as inferior. Comas (1961) argued that anthropologists have a moral obligation to show the truth in institutionalized prejudices that many native groups lived under. Comas traveled throughout the continent to argue for native rights. He was recognized for it in his later life and after his death, and many of his students still see him as great figure.

== Critiques ==
The work of Juan Comas is seen as one of the important contributions to physical anthropology in Latin America. However, there is critique to his published work. Kleg (1993) argues that even within the work of Comas, institutionalized and embedded racism is present. This is a fact that Comas himself, in arguing against one form of racism, never realized or never saw his biases as racist. Kleg (1993) presents his case in the work commissioned by UNESCO, Racial Myths. In this book, Comas makes the argument that Christianity is in fundamentally unprejudiced and does not define people inferior due to their physical characteristics (Kleg 1993). However, at the time, Comas argues that the Old Testament, Kleg argues in reference to Judaism, in inherently racist. Kleg suggests that despite his best efforts to fight against racism, his biases surfaced in this work.

However one may interpret the passages used by Comas, and despite embedded prejudices, Comas (1953) does point out to the fallacy of assigning Jewish background as a race. In addition, his experiences of living through hyper-nationalism in Spain allowed him to see the fallacy in the creation of such categories by social structures. Comas (1950; 1951; 1961) also argued the false creation of prejudiced thinking against Jews. One can never truly escape the structure that one lives under, and Comas was no exception. However, Comas was a maverick, one of the truly few anthropologists in Latin America that called for an end to racism and declared the use of political activism to end prejudices.

== Physical anthropology ==
Comas was an ardent researcher in physical anthropology. Though he supported a four-field approach to anthropology, Comas wrote most passionately about physical anthropology. He believed that the field within Latin America lacked a consistent and complete literature. (Comas, 1960). This feeling pushed him to write the Manual of Physical Anthropology—written in 1957, and an English version following in 1960.

In his textbook, among other works, Comas compiled a history of the discipline. This pursuit of understanding the history of the discipline allowed Comas to create works that were available to the majority of the public (Medina Hernández, 1980). Further more, his editorial skills translated into the publishing of several academic journals. Between 1943 and 1955, Comas was director or editor of several journals and publications, which maintained high academic prestige and workmanship (Medina Hernández, 1980). These included: América Indígena, Boletín Indigenista, and Boletín Bibliográfico de Antropología Americana. He was also the founder of Anales de Antropología, the prestigious journal published by the UNAM (Universidad Nacional Autónoma de México).

Comas' methods were scrupulous. He believed that scientific research and measurements should be done in the most of objective ways, and he was vocal against studies that misused anthropometric techniques and created prejudiced view in the reconstruction of racial histories. Two examples of this was his 1961 article published in Current Anthropology, titled "'Scientific' Racism Again?" and his 1965 book Somatometría de los indios triques de Oaxaca, México. In the former Comas (1961) lashed out against Garret for his circular arguments. Comas believed that using anthropometric measurements to conclude that one group of people were inferior to another had no scientific basis. One could use the measurements one found to determine any differences in other people as an inferior character, and thus, be able to promote any racist agenda that the scientist held.

Comas' study of race relations in Latin America also argues against studies that formed prejudiced view of certain groups of people. Comas (1961) demonstrated the way in which many Latin American countries had institutionalized racism due to previous studies. In this study, Comas argues against the statements of Lipschutz. Lipschutz had argued that the white race was superior to others, and that when an indigenous or black person became intelligent, was because he used the advances of the white race to get ahead. Comas, instead, argued that these views were extremely negative and that were based on already preconceived biases. He believed that by reproducing racial groups, society caused the continuation of racism: "La realidad es que la 'raza' juega en la vida moderna un papel importante ya que en muchos países sirve de base an ordenamientos, o por lo menos prácticas de discriminación socio-económica" (Comas, 1961). Comas attempted to bring out the fallacy in these arguments, and tried to use the discipline to better the situation.

=== Contributions to the field ===
Juan Comas contributed greatly to the discipline. He has been acknowledged by organizations on physical anthropology throughout the world. I will discuss here only a few of his lasting contribution to the field. Juan Comas saw the discipline in Latin America as a great tool. However, when he arrived to the American continent, Comas saw that the literature and work were not complete. He wanted to change that. One way he accomplished this, already mentioned above, was through popularizing the discipline through the journals that he edited and founded. A second way Comas contributed to the literature of the discipline was in his—often cited as a masterpiece—textbook, Manual of Physical Anthropology (1957, 1960). This was an extensive book that was used throughout the continent, and even translated into English. This book was one of the first in the Spanish-speaking world to demonstrate the history of the discipline—one of Comas focus in life—as well as present an argument for evolution in Darwin's sense. This he got from his mentor Pittard who had done lots of work on the origin of the human species in Switzerland.

It is important not to down-play the significance of Comas' contributions to social justice and the attempts to demonstrate work that was inherently biased. His personal belief on indigenismo and anti-racist stands, defined him as an ardent scientific who wanted to demonstrate all research correctly. Comas wanted argued that racism was inherent in many social structures, and that by examining our history, especially that of the first half of the 20th century, we could understand the fallacies within that argument (Comas, 1964). Nationalist agendas, according to Comas, responsible for the prejudices the world had seen.

Juan Comas also left a summation of the history of the American Journal of Physical Anthropology. Juan Comas's summary history of the American association of physical anthropologists (1928–1968), is a massive work that Alfonso and Little say is indispensable to the historian of the discipline.

Comas' work has been honored in numerous places. He received honorary doctorates from three universities, and was hailed as a hero in his home town. The American Association of Physical Anthropologists honors his life every year with the Juan Comas Award. The UNAM's anthropology department has named the library after Juan Comas.

== Conclusion ==
Juan Comas died on January 18, 1979. He died in a sudden manner, while working in the UNAM (Universidad Nacional Autónoma de México). He was five days from his 79th birthday, and was still as dedicated to his work as any other time in his life (Hernández Mora, 1979). He had been honored by the country of his birth, in his home town, the year before, four years after the death of Franco. In addition, he was honored at the Universidad Complutense in Spain. These two honored actions left him with an air of accomplishment that he had yet to feel. He had received the highest of admiration from the country he had left.

Juan Comas accomplishments are numerous. He wrote over one-hundred fifty works, and each demonstrated his passion for activism. Once in Mexico, Comas devoted his work to the pursuit of bettering the lives of others, especially the vulnerable, indigenous populations that were not being supported by the country. He was an exiled Spanish Republican, editor of numerous journals, historian of the discipline, ex-communist, anti-racist, and indigenista (Gomez Izquierdo, 2000). His life has been honored, and his academic legacy will be one to look at for generations of Latin American anthropologists and elsewhere.

== See also ==
- Bronislaw Malinowski Award

=== References ===
Notes

- Aguirre Beltrán G. 1980. El Indigenista. In: Instituto de Investigaciones Antropológicas, editor. In Memoriam: Juan Comas Camps (1900–1979). México: Universidad Nacional Autónoma de México.
- Comas J. 1942. Los Grupos Sanguineos y la Raciologia Americana. Revista Mexicana de Sociología 4(3): 69–73.
- Comas J. 1950. The Teaching of Anthropology and the Role of the Anthropologist in Latin America. American Anthropologist 52(4): 564–568.
- Comas J. 1953. Racial Myths. Paris: UNESCO.
- Comas J. and Genovés TS. 1959. Science in Spain. Science 130(3382): 1044.
- Comas J. 1960. Manual of Physical Anthropology. Springfield: Charles C Thomas Publisher, Bannerstone House.
- Comas J. 1960. Generalities. In: Comas J. Manual of Physical Anthropology. Springfield: Charles C Thomas Publisher, Bannerstone House.
- Comas J. 1961. Relaciones Inter-Raciales en América Latina: 1940–1960. México: Universidad Nacional Autónoma de México.
- Comas J. 1961. “Scientific” Racism Again? Current Anthropology 2(4): 303–340.
- Comas J. 1965. Somatometria de los indios triques de Oaxaca, México. Mexico: Universidad Nacional Autónoma de México.
- Comas J 1966. Racism. In: The Objectives of Physical Anthropology. In: Hammond PB, editor. Physical Anthropology and Archaeology: Selected Readings. New York: The Macmillan Company.
- Comas J. 1966. The Objectives of Physical Anthropology. In: Hammond PB, editor. Physical Anthropology and Archaeology: Selected Readings. New York: The Macmillan Company.
- Hernández Mor J. 1979. Juan Comas, una esquema de una vida. Revista Española de antropología Americana 9: 17–24.
- Genovés S, León-Portilla M., Sodi D. 1965. Presentación. In: Genovès S, León-Portilla M, Sodi D, editors. Homenaje a Juan Comas, Volume 1. México: Editoriales Libros de México, S.A.
- Gomez Izquierda J. 2000. El discurso antirracista de un antropólogo antirracista: Juan Comas. Desacatos 4.
- Kleg M. 1993. Hate, Prejudice, and Racism. Albany: SUNY Press.
- Medina Hernández A. 1980. Juan Comas, como historiador de la ciencia. In: Instituto de Investigaciones Antropológicas, editor. In Memoriam: Juan Comas Camps (1900–1979). México: Universidad Nacional Autónoma de México.
- Medina Hernández A. 2004. Veinte años de Antropología Mexicana. La configuración de una Antropología del Sur. Mexican Studies/ Estudios Mexicanos 20(2): 231–274.
- Politis GG. 2003. The Theoretical Landscape and the Methodological Development of Archaeology in Latin America. American Antiquity 68(2): 245–272.
- Rex D. 1980. Juan Comas en España. In: Instituto de Investigaciones Antropológicas, editor. In Memoriam: Juan Comas Camps (1900–1979). México: Universidad Nacional Autónoma de México.
- Romano Pacheco A. 1980. El Maestro. In: Instituto de Investigaciones Antropológicas, editor. In Memoriam: Juan Comas Camps (1900–1979). México: Universidad Nacional Autónoma de México.
- Romero Salvadó FJ. 2005. The Spanish Civil War: Origins, Course and Outcomes. New York: Palgrave Macmillan.
- Spencer F. 1986. Ecce Homo: An Annotated Bibliographic History of Physical Anthropology. New York: Greenwood Press.
- Vincent M. 2007. Spain 1833–2002: People and State. Oxford: Oxford University Press.
