= 1987–88 in Argentine football =

Football in Argentina
- Season: 1987–88

1987–88 in Argentine football saw Newell's Old Boys win the Argentine championship, their first title since 1974. In the Copa Libertadores 1987 River Plate and Independiente were eliminated at the semi-final stage.

== League table ==
Position	Team	Points	Played	Won	Drawn	Lost	For	Against	Difference
1	Newell's Old Boys	55	38	21	13	4	68	22	46
2	San Lorenzo	49	38	16	17	5	49	28	21
3	Racing Club	48	38	15	18	5	51	33	18
4	River Plate	46	38	17	12	9	51	40	11
5	Gimnasia de La Plata	43	38	11	21	6	44	36	8
6	Vélez Sársfield	41	38	14	13	11	51	41	10
7	Rosario Central	40	38	12	16	10	53	41	12
8	Argentinos Juniors	40	38	15	10	13	49	44	5
9	Deportivo Español	40	38	11	18	9	49	47	2
10	Platense	38	38	12	14	12	42	45	-3
11	Independiente	37	38	12	13	13	37	44	-7
12	Boca Juniors	35	38	12	11	15	40	55	-15
13	Deportivo Armenio	34	38	8	18	12	37	45	-8
14	Ferro Carril Oeste	33	38	7	19	12	27	35	-8
15	Instituto de Córdoba	33	38	10	15	13	43	53	-10
16	Estudiantes de La Plata	32	38	6	20	12	31	43	-12
17	Racing de Córdoba	31	38	10	11	17	31	44	-13
18	Unión de Santa Fe	28	38	8	12	18	39	52	-13
19	Banfield	28	38	7	14	17	36	56	-20
20	Talleres de Córdoba	27	38	6	15	17	40	64	-24

- Newells Old Boys qualified for Copa Libertadores 1988 as champions of Argentina.
- Teams highlighted in light blue qualified for the Liguilla Pre-Libertadores.

=== Top Scorers ===
Position	Player	Team	Goals
1	José Luis Rodríguez	Deportivo Español	18
2	Marío Bevilaqua	Talleres de Córdoba	17
3	José Iglesias	Racing Club	16
3	Walter Perazzo	San Lorenzo	16

=== Relegation ===
Unión de Santa Fe and Banfield were relegated with the worst points averages.

=== Liguilla Pre-Libertadores ===
Quarter-finals

Home (1st leg)	Home (2nd leg)	1st Leg	2nd leg	Aggregate
Argentinos Juniors	Racing Club	1-1	1-3	2-4
Textil Mandiyú	San Lorenzo	1-1	1-1	2-2
Rosario Central	River Plate	0-0	0-1	0-1
Velez Sarsfield	Gimnasia La Plata	3-0	1-1	4-1

Semi-finals

Home (1st leg)	Home (2nd leg)	1st Leg	2nd leg	Aggregate
River Plate	Racing Club	3-3	0-1	3-4
Velez Sarsfield	San Lorenzo	0-1	0-0	0-1

Final

Home (1st leg)	Home (2nd leg)	1st Leg	2nd leg	Aggregate
Racing Club	San Lorenzo	0-2	1-0	1-2

- San Lorenzo qualify for Copa Libertadores 1988.

== Argentine clubs in international competitions ==
Team	Copa Libertadores 1987
Independiente	SF
River Plate	SF
Rosario Central	Round 1
