= Jorge Cruz-Cruz =

Colombian footballer, coach, and scout

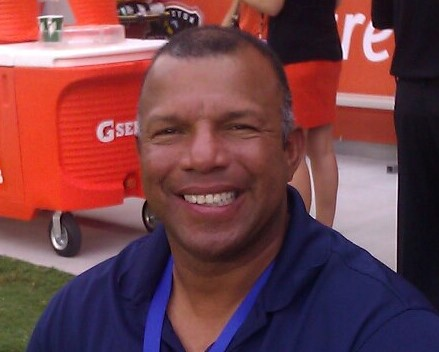

Personal information
- Date of birth: March 30, 1966 (age 60)
- Place of birth: Tulua Valle, Colombia
- Position: Forward

Youth career
- America de Cali

College career
Years	Team	Apps	(Gls)
1985–1989	Houston Baptist		(29)

Senior career*
Years	Team	Apps	(Gls)
1989–1990	Racing de Córdoba	24	(6)
1990	Independiente Santa Fe		(9)
1991	Chaco For Ever	16	(5)
1991–1994	Huracán	65	(25)
1994	Quilmes		
Total		102	(36)

International career
1993	Colombia	1	(0)
- * Club domestic league appearances and goals

Jorge Enrique Cruz-Cruz (born March 30, 1966) is a former Colombian footballer and current scout/coach who played professionally for clubs in Colombia and Argentina. He holds a United States United States Soccer Federation A Coaching License with a NSCAA National Goalkeeper License, a Brazilian B License, and an Asian Football Confederation A License. Cruz formerly coached the Central Texas Lobos FC of the Gulf Coast Premier League and has served the United States Soccer Federation on the Development Academy and Olympic Development sides.

== Professional career ==
Cruz began to develop at America de Cali in his native Colombia before moving to Houston, Texas, USA to pursue a college degree. He was lured back to South America and featured for Racing de Córdoba in 1989/90 amassing 6 goals in 24 games. Cruz went on short stints with both Independiente Santa Fe and Chaco For Ever impressing in the National B which led to a transfer to Huracán in 1992 where Cruz went on to score 25 goals in 65 matches. Having been the highest goal scorer in National B and First Division, Cruz earned the title of Top Goal Scorer of the year in Argentina. This fine form caught the attention of the managers of Colombia (Francisco Maturana) as well as USA (Bora Milutinović), but Cruz was unable to squeeze into a position at the World Cup 1994 for either nation. A short spell followed at Quilmes (B Nacional, 8 matches, 2 goals) before Cruz returned to the US to pursue a career in coaching.

Cruz, often referred to by the double last name 'Cruz-Cruz' was a right-footed forward who was also good in the air. He is endeared at Huracán for not only a goal-scoring race of 1993 with Alberto Acosta but also helping the team to a runner-up finish in the 1994 Clausura. Cruz made a common practice of thanking God for goals and good performances.

== Coaching career ==
Cruz has been a United States Soccer Development Academy Scout since 2008 and also an Assistant Coach for the U14, U15, and U17 USA Girls National Teams. Cruz served as an Assistant Coach of the Jordan Women's National Team under Michael Dickey from 2017 to 2018. Cruz worked as a Professional Match Evaluator for Major League Soccer from 2010 to 2017 and has been on the Olympic Development Program staff since 2005.
