= Ariel Cozzoni =

Argentine footballer

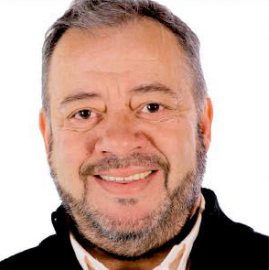

Personal information
- Full name: Ariel Osvaldo Cozzoni
- Date of birth: January 21, 1964 (age 62)
- Place of birth: Rosario, Argentina
- Height: 1.84 m (6 ft 0 in)
- Position: Striker

Youth career
- Newell's Old Boys

Senior career*
Years	Team	Apps	(Gls)
1985–1990	Newell's Old Boys		
1988–1989	→ Instituto (loan)	39	(19)
1990–1991	Nice	8	(1)
1991–1992	Toluca	23	(5)
1993	Newell's Old Boys		
1993–1994	Banfield	16	(3)
1994–1996	Central Córdoba	45	(19)
1996	O'Higgins	6	(0)
1996	Gimnasia CdU		
- * Club domestic league appearances and goals

Ariel Osvaldo Cozzoni (born 21 January 1964) is a former Argentine football striker. He played club football in Argentina, France, Mexico and Chile.

== Career ==
Cozzoni started his professional playing career in 1985 with Newell's Old Boys. He was loaned to Instituto de Córdoba for the 1988–1989 season, but returned in 1990 to help Newell's to win the 1990–1991 championship. During the season, he was the league's top goalscorer with 23 goals.

After the 1991 season, he joined OGC Nice in France and then went on to play for Toluca in Mexico before returning to Newell's in 1993.

In 1994, Cozzoni joined Club Atlético Banfield, but left later that year to join Central Córdoba in the Argentine 2nd division where he played until 1996.

Cozzoni ended his career in 1996 after playing for Chilean club O'Higgins and Gimnasia y Esgrima de Concepción del Uruguay in his homeland.

== Personal life ==
Cozzoni has developed a career in politics and was elected councillor of Rosario in 2019.

== Titles ==
Season	Team	Title
Apertura 1990	Newell's Old Boys	Primera División Argentina
1990–1991	Newell's Old Boys	Primera División Argentina
