= Textil Mandiyú =

Football club in Corrientes, Argentina

- Full name: Club Social y Deportivo Textil Mandiyú
- Nickname(s): Albo; Algodonero
- Founded: December 22, 1998; 26 years ago
- Dissolved: June 27, 2016; 8 years ago
- Ground: Estadio José Antonio Romero Feris, Corrientes; Argentina
- Capacity: 15,700
- 2016 Torneo Federal B: 1° (Promoted)
Home colours	Away colours

Club Social y Deportivo Textil Mandiyú, commonly referred as Textil Mandiyú, was an Argentine football club, based in Corrientes, in the Province of the same name. The squad currently plays in the regionalised third tier of Argentine football league system, the Torneo Federal A.

== History ==
In 1993, Deportivo Mandiyú chairman Eduardo Seferian tried the club to become a S.A. as a way to solve the serious economic problems of the institution but the Argentine Football Association did not allow the transaction. Nevertheless, in 1994 member of Argentine Parliament Roberto Cruz and San Lorenzo leading Roberto Navarro acquired the club for U$S 2 million. Mandiyú hired Diego Maradona as coach, also bringing international goalkeeper Sergio Goycochea to the team.

The project was a big failure, so Mandiyú did a disappointing campaign in 1995 Clausura being relegated to the second division. Finally, the group that managed Mandiyú left the team alleging that they had not enough resources to play the Nacional B tournament. With no visible leaders to manage the club and many debts which could not pay, Mandiyú was disaffiliated from the Liga Correntina. The club was subsequently dissolved.

Huracán Corrientes filled the vacant place left by Mandiyú, promoting to Primera División after winning the Nacional B championship. In 1998, a group of former managers and fans of Mandiyú decided to form a new club, originally named "Deportivo Textil". The word "Mandiyú" was added later, with the intention of keeping the soul of the original club.

In 2016 the club merged with the Deportivo Mandiyú, once again being the Mandiyú representing the "cotton growers".
