= Deportivo Español =

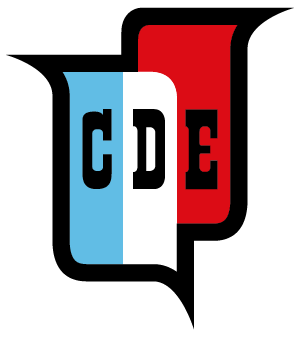
- Full name: Club Social, Deportivo y Cultural Español de la República de Argentina
- Nickname: Gallegos
- Founded: 12 October 1956; 69 years ago
- Ground: Estadio Nueva España, Buenos Aires
- Capacity: 36,000
- Chairman: María Sol Méndez
- Manager: Néstor Fernández
- League: Primera C
- 2025: 6th. of Zona A Playoffs: semifinals
Home colours	Away colours

Club Deportivo Español (officially Club Social, Deportivo y Cultural de la República Argentina) is a sports club from Argentina, located in the Parque Avellaneda of Buenos Aires. The club is mostly known for its football team, which currently plays in the Primera C, the fourth tier of the Argentine football league system directly affiliated to AFA.

It was founded on 12 October 1956 by immigrants living in the city of Buenos Aires. Over the years, it has established itself as one of the most important clubs within the Spanish community in Argentina, having had more than 25,000 members throughout its history, as well as being the club that has achieved the most success in professional sport, having competed in Argentina's First Division for fifteen years.

Since 8 March 2026, it has been chaired by María Sol Méndez, who is its first female chairperson in its history.

== History ==
=== The beginnings ===
The club is a social, cultural and sporting organisation founded on 12 October 1956 by a group of Spaniards living in Argentina, under the name Club Deportivo Español de Buenos Aires. The date was specially selected to commemorate the Spanish National day.

The aim was to bring together under a single footballing body all those passionate about the game who were of Spanish origin or descendants of those immigrants who, alongside other significant communities, had contributed so much to the development of Argentina.

Its first headquarters were in the basement of "Bar La Mezquita" in Buenos Aires, and barely a year after its creation it already had approximately two thousand members, which led to the move in 1957 to the Centro Ribadumia premises. Its first president was Luis Soler Camino.

=== Entering to AFA competitions ===
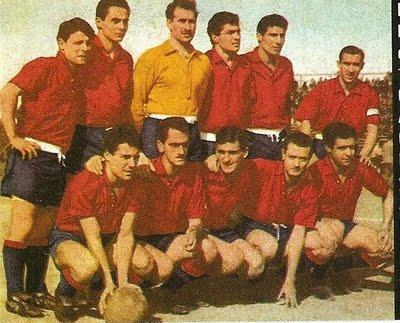
The 1960 squad which were promoted to Primera B Metropolitana.

In 1957 affiliated to the Argentine Football Association (AFA) and the football team began to participate in the fourth division ("Tercera de Ascenso", equivalent to Torneo Promocional Amateur) chaining a meteoric promotion row in the upper tiers.

Just a year after joining the AFA Español won the amateur championship promoting to "Segunda de Ascenso" (today Primera C) and only 3 years after, Español won the league being promoted to the second-tier league Primera B (Nacional was introduced in the 80').

Amid this successes, the team embraced a tour to Spain, where they played teams as Pontevedra, Real Oviedo, Espanyol de Barcelona, Athetic Bilbao, Elche and Real Madrid, with Alfredo Di Stéfano and Puskas among their main squad.

The 1960 squad which were promoted to Primera B Metropolitana.

In 1967, only ten years after its foundation, Deportivo Español got promoted to the Argentine Primera División, the top tier in Argentine football.

=== Institutional growth and sporting decline ===
Deportivo Español not only developed a competitive football squad but also became the most popular Spanish club in Argentina. In the 1960s the Municipality of Buenos Aires granted the club 16 hectares in the south suburbs, where the club began to build its training complex. The members themselves involved to the point where they filled in the marshy land in the Bajo Flores area of Buenos Aires with rubbles and dirt and laid the foundations for the current building complex. Meanwhile, the first team played their home matches at various stadiums along the city.

There was no shortage of setbacks on the pitch, as the first team was unable to maintain its place in the First Division status and was relegated two tiers, reaching back to Tercera de Ascenso (Primera C) back in 1972, where they will remain for 7 years.

=== Back in the spotlight ===
Under the new presidency of Francisco Ríos Seoane, who had also served as president of the iconic Cervecería San Carlos, Deportivo Español were crowned Primera C champions once again in 1979, marking the beginning of the club's golden age. In the late 1970s, Español purchased the land that had previously been granted by the local council.

On 11 February 1981, the Estadio España was inaugurated in a match against Deportivo La Coruña. It had an initial capacity of 18,000 spectators and was built on the club's grounds

In 1984, following a record-breaking season, Español won the Primera B championship with a 16-point lead over the runners-up, Defensores de Belgrano, and were promoted to the First Division for the second time in their history.

The 1984 championship-winning team was led by the coaching duo Oscar López and Oscar Cavallero, who had selected a squad of experienced players mixed with promising young talents and valuable club players. The main squad was led by Pedro Catalano in goal; Guillermo Zarate, Noberto D'Angelo, Héctor Clide Díaz and Lorenzo Ojeda on defense; Julio Crespo, Luis Alberto Correa and Fernando Donaires in midfield; and Cesár Lorea, Luis Moreno and José Luis "Puma" Rodríguez up front.

=== Glorious years ===
In 1985, Español began its second spell in Primera Division, where it remained for 14 consecutive years. During the 1985–86 season Español finished 2nd along with Newell's Old Boys, defeating Independiente, San Lorenzo de Almagro, former champion River Plate in the Estadio Monumental and remained unbeaten against Boca Juniors. In the next seasons, Español finished 3rd in 1988–89 season and 2nd in the 1992 Clausura.

Among its most notable achievements were participation in the Copa CONMEBOL (in 1992 and 1993) and in the Pre-Libertadores Play-offs in 1989 and 1992, and the club was invited on an international tour to Korea to compete in the President's Cup in 1987.

In social terms, the club had as many as 25,000 active members. The Spanish community's most important celebrations took place at Deportivo Español's facilities, making it the go-to meeting place for prominent figures from Spain, such as former Prime Minister Felipe González.

In 1996, the club refurbished its stadium and installed a state-of-the-art lighting system for its time. Meanwhile, various sports teams, including figure skating, roller hockey and basketball, were crowned champions.

=== The problems began ===
Between 1995 and 1996, under the presidency of Francisco Ríos Seoane, it was decided to merge Club Deportivo Español with two other organisations within the community such as the Hospital Español de Buenos Aires, to form a new organisation called Unión Española, under which name Deportivo Español competed in AFA tournaments during a brief period. The merge was dissolved on suspicion of tax fraud, each organisation went its separate way, and Deportivo Español reclaimed its name.

=== Crisis and seizure of the club ===
During 1998 a series of financial disputes led to a financial crisis at the club, and following an order from judge Juan Gariboto, the club was forced to close its doors due to the large number of bankruptcy claims. This initial closure lasted only a few days, but it served as a major wake-up call for the club.

That same year, the team was relegated to the Nacional B and the following year, the club closed for three months, being withdrawn from the First Division promotion play-offs it was competing in.

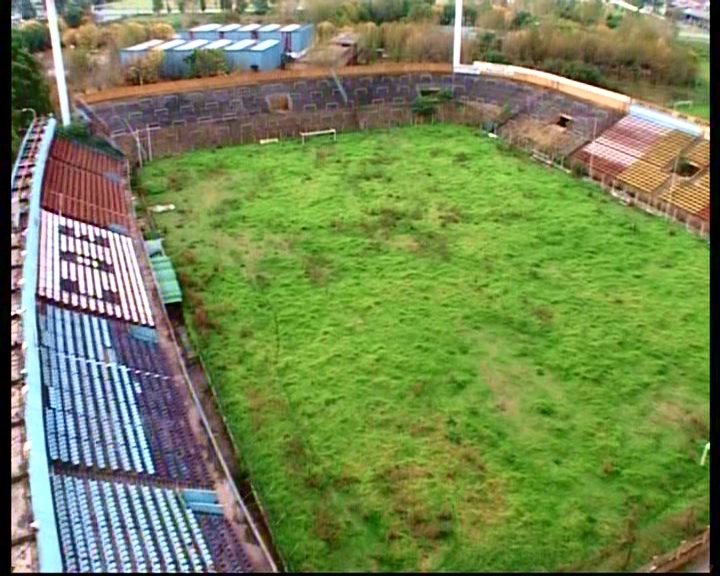
Estadio España 2007

During 2000 the so-called Sociedad Española de Deportes, chaired by Daniel Hurtado, took over the professional team and its place within the AFA, but in the team got relegated to Primera B, and at the end of the one-year period, despite the fact that 71% of the creditors agreed that the club should remain open, judge Juan Garibotto once again ordered its permanent shutdown, meanwhile the protests of the club members and supporters who made themselves heard, kept them locked inside the club for a week to prevent the facilities from being auctioned.

Around that time, the Trust Law was enacted in Argentina, stipulating that the assets of non-profit civil societies cannot be auctioned off for a period of ten years, meaning the club's bankruptcy case became entangled in a legal maze.

The Sociedad Española de Deportes, chaired by Daniel Osvaldo Calzón, managed to secure an extension of its operations until 2003, where the club facilities were finally closed and put to auction in 2007. In the meantime, the main squad continued in its competitions playing in different stadiums, and remained in Primera B. With no facilities, the alternative activities in the institution were slowly disassembling and many of the players found space in other teams in the surrounding areas. Facilities remained abandoned for four years.

=== Reopening and new challenges ===
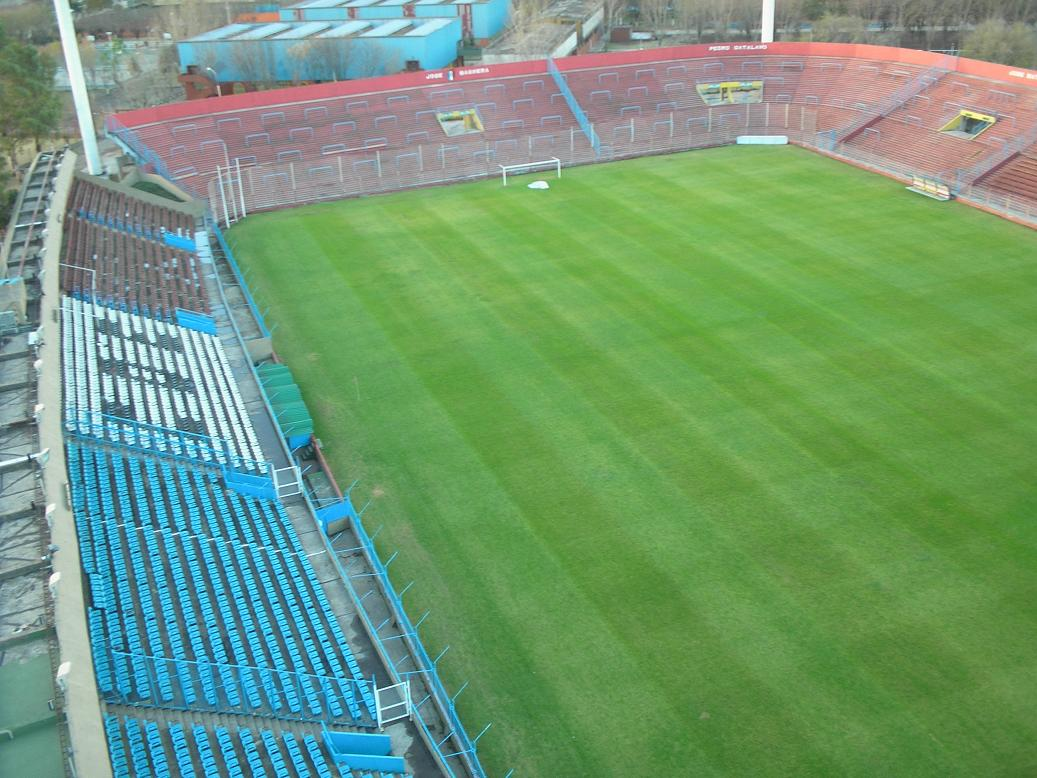
Estadio España 2008

After the facilities were acquired by Corporación Buenos Aires Sur, an entity dependant on the Municipality of Buenos Aires in 2007, infrastructure was dire straits. A lot of effort was put by the government together with the club members to rebump the stadium and restart activities at home ground.

Initially, there were talks of joint use of the sports complex, and the possibility of building a sports hotel and a CeNARD in the southern part of the city was mentioned, but following Mauricio Macri’s inauguration as Mayor of Buenos Aires, it was transferred to the City of Buenos Aires Ministry of Justice and Security, which divided the site and took over the remaining part, including the existing facilities (administrative offices, tennis courts, softball, volleyball, basketball and bocce courts, leisure pools, an olympic-sized swimming pool, rear barbecue area, a gym with a parquet basketball court, an indoor gym and artistic gymnastics hall, a covered roller hockey rink, a covered barbecue area for 300 diners and its surrounding barbecues), to house the Metropolitan Police of the City of Buenos Aires.

Following a series of institutional setbacks, the club has fluctuated between Primera B and Primera C, with the latter being the division in which it currently competes as of 2026.

=== Current facilities ===
The sports complex comprises a restaurant and function room, a gazebo with outdoor seating, a five-a-side football pitch, a car park, 3 training pitches and the Nueva España stadium.

During 2017 negotiations were initiated with the Government of the City of Buenos Aires in response to their latter's expressed interest in extending the premises of the Metropolitan Police facilities running in former club facilities, arguing the need to cover part of the site that had been granted to the club on a loan basis in 2008, taking advantage of the approaching renewal date of the original agreement.

After several years with the threat of losing even more physical space by the authorities, the by then deputy María Sol Mendez billed a project to claim the historical right of the club to retain and even recover their facilities, concretely requested that the Club Social y Deportivo Cultural Español de la República Argentina civil association be granted a temporary licence, for a term of one hundred (100) years, of the site bounded by the axis of Av. Santiago de Compostela, the axis of Av. Asturias, the axis of Av. Castañares and the virtual extension of the axis of Calle Fernández, with access via Av. Santiago de Compostela 3873 in the Autonomous City of Buenos Aires.

The bill finally passed with unanimous approval by the Legislatura de la Ciudad in November 2025.

== Chairmen ==
- 1956–57: Luis Soler Camino
- 1958–59:Adolfo García Rebón
- 1960–63: Rafael Pérez Roldán
- 1964–65: Adolfo García Rebón
- 1966–70: José Rodríguez Vázquez
- 1971–77: Adolfo García Rebón
- 1978–96: Francisco Ríos Seoane
- 1996–98: Manuel Rilo
- 1998–99 Daniel Calzón
- 1999–2000: Daniel Hurtado
- 2000–03: Daniel Calzón
- 2003: Avelino Pardellas
- 2004–08: Mario Rodríguez San Martín
- 2008–10: Eloy Alvaredo Rodríguez
- 2011: Mario Rodríguez San Martín
- 2011: Daniel Hortal
- 2012: Jose López Rey
- 2012: Manuel Tomé Peón
- 2012/17: Daniel Calzón
- 2017–18: Luis Tarrío Gómez
- 2018: Gabriel Fernández
- 2018–26: Diego Martín Elías
- 2026–present: María Sol Mendez

== Titles ==
=== National ===
- Primera B Metropolitana (2): 1984, 2001–02
- Primera C Metropolitana (2): 1960, 1979
- Primera D (1): 1958

=== Friendly ===
- Copa Dos Penínsulas: 1962, 1964, 1966, 1979, 1980, 1981, 1986, 1998, 2008 (compartida con Deportivo Italiano), 2014
- Toreno de los Equipos Chicos: 1964
- Copa "Rios Seoane": 1981
- Copa Hermandad: 2008
- Copa UPM: 2013.
