= 1996 Copa Libertadores group stage =

The 1996 Copa Libertadores group stage or 1996 Copa Libertadores first stage was played from 13 March to 17 April 1996. A total of 20 teams competed in the group stage to decide 15 places in the final stages of the 1996 Copa Libertadores, where they joined defending champions Grêmio.

== Groups composition ==
Same as previous editions, the 20 participating teams were divided into 5 groups of 4, which consisted of two teams from one national association and two teams from another. The draw of the tournament was held on 3 November 1995 in Asunción, Paraguay and the paired associations for this edition were as follows:

- Group 1: Paraguay and Ecuador
- Group 2: Uruguay and Peru
- Group 3: Bolivia and Colombia
- Group 4: Brazil and Chile
- Group 5: Argentina and Venezuela

== Format ==
In the group stage, each group was played on a home-and-away round-robin basis. The teams were ranked according to the following criteria: 1. Points (3 points for a win, 1 point for a draw, and 0 points for a loss); 2. Goal difference; 3. Goals scored; 4. Away goals scored; 5. Drawing of lots.

As of this edition, the extra game that was played to define the positions between teams from the same national association in case of a tie in points was no longer held. Therefore, the above criteria were applied to all teams regardless of the national association to which they belong.

The winners, runners-up and third placed teams of each group advanced to the round of 16 of the final stages.

== Groups ==
=== Group 1 ===
Pos	Team	Pld	W	D	L	GF	GA	GD	Pts	Qualification	BAR	CCP	ESP	OLI
1	(Ecuador) Barcelona	6	4	1	1	11	8	+3	13	Round of 16	—	3–2	3–2	2–1
2	(Paraguay) Cerro Porteño	6	3	1	2	8	7	+1	10	Round of 16	1–0	—	2–1	0–0
3	(Ecuador) ESPOLI	6	2	0	4	7	10	−3	6	Round of 16	1–2	2–1	—	1–0
4	(Paraguay) Olimpia	6	1	2	3	5	6	−1	5		1–1	1–2	2–0	—

Source: RSSSF
13 March 1996
--:-- UTC−5

Barcelona (Ecuador)	3–2	(Ecuador) ESPOLI
Gómez 52'; Alfaro 56'; Noriega 80'	Report	Jauch 47'; Oleas 51'

Estadio Monumental Isidro Romero Carbo, Guayaquil
Attendance: 35,000
Referee: Ángel Guevara (Ecuador)
13 March 1996
--:-- UTC−3

Olimpia (Paraguay)	1–2	(Paraguay) Cerro Porteño
Bourdier 29'	Report	Núñez 33'; Villamayor 78'

Estadio Defensores del Chaco, Asunción
Attendance: 12,000
Referee: Ubaldo Aquino (Paraguay)

19 March 1996
--:-- UTC−5

ESPOLI (Ecuador)	1–0	(Paraguay) Olimpia
Oleas 34'	Report

Estadio Olímpico Atahualpa, Quito
Attendance: 10,000
Referee: John Toro (Colombia)
22 March 1996
--:-- UTC−5

Barcelona (Ecuador)	2–1	(Paraguay) Olimpia
Makanaky 19'; Alfaro 86'	Report	Bourdier 26'

Estadio Monumental Isidro Romero Carbo, Guayaquil
Attendance: 20,000
Referee: Armando Pérez (Colombia)

26 March 1996
--:-- UTC−5

ESPOLI (Ecuador)	2–1	(Paraguay) Cerro Porteño
Rivera 74', 87'	Report	Ferreira 34'

Estadio Olímpico Atahualpa, Quito
Attendance: 10,000
Referee: José Arana (Peru)
29 March 1996
--:-- UTC−5

Barcelona (Ecuador)	3–2	(Paraguay) Cerro Porteño
Sarabia 1' (o.g.); Morales 69' (pen.); Alfaro 85'	Report	Espinoza 9'; Villamayor 56'

Estadio Monumental Isidro Romero Carbo, Guayaquil
Attendance: 70,000
Referee: Alberto Tejada (Peru)

3 April 1996
--:-- UTC−5

ESPOLI (Ecuador)	1–2	(Ecuador) Barcelona
Zambrano 67'	Report	Gilson 80', 86'

Estadio Olímpico Atahualpa, Quito
Attendance: 35,000
Referee: Rafael Hormazábal (Chile)
3 April 1996
--:-- UTC−3

Cerro Porteño (Paraguay)	0–0	(Paraguay) Olimpia
	Report

Estadio Defensores del Chaco, Asunción
Referee: Óscar Velázquez (Paraguay)

9 April 1996
--:-- UTC−3

Cerro Porteño (Paraguay)	2–1	(Ecuador) ESPOLI
Ferreira 16'; Núñez 87' (pen.)	Report	Yépez 37'

Estadio General Pablo Rojas, Asunción
Referee: Daniel Giménez (Argentina)
12 April 1996
--:-- UTC−3

Olimpia (Paraguay)	2–0	(Ecuador) ESPOLI
Sotelo 58', 65'	Report

Estadio Defensores del Chaco, Asunción
Referee: Horacio Elizondo (Argentina)

16 April 1996
--:-- UTC−3

Cerro Porteño (Paraguay)	1–0	(Ecuador) Barcelona
Cristaldo 85'	Report

Estadio General Pablo Rojas, Asunción
Attendance: 6,000
Referee: Sidrack Marinho dos Santos (Brazil)
19 April 1996
--:-- UTC−3

Olimpia (Paraguay)	1–1	(Ecuador) Barcelona
Bourdier 2' (pen.)	Report	Usuriaga 71'

Estadio Defensores del Chaco, Asunción
Referee: Antônio Pereira (Brazil)

=== Group 2 ===
Pos	Team	Pld	W	D	L	GF	GA	GD	Pts	Qualification	PEÑ	DFS	SCR	UNI
1	(Uruguay) Peñarol	6	2	3	1	13	10	+3	9	Round of 16	—	1–1	1–1	1–2
2	(Uruguay) Defensor Sporting	6	1	4	1	6	6	0	7	Round of 16	2–4	—	0–0	2–0
3	(Peru) Sporting Cristal	6	1	4	1	6	7	−1	7	Round of 16	3–3	0–0	—	0–2
4	(Peru) Universitario	6	2	1	3	7	9	−2	7		1–3	1–1	1–2	—

Source: RSSSF
13 March 1996
--:-- UTC−5

Sporting Cristal (Peru)	0–2	(Peru) Universitario
	Report	González 9'; Ferrari 62'

Estadio Nacional, Lima
Attendance: 11,000
Referee: César Córdova (Peru)
18 March 1996
--:-- UTC−3

Defensor Sporting (Uruguay)	2–4	(Uruguay) Peñarol
Jorjão 32'; Ra. Dos Santos 43'	Report	Soca 19'; Romero 27', 68' (pen.); Sosa 85'

Estadio Centenario, Montevideo
Attendance: 16,000
Referee: Saúl Feldman (Uruguay)

23 March 1996
--:-- UTC−5

Universitario (Peru)	1–3	(Uruguay) Peñarol
Gonzales 67'	Report	Pacheco 48'; Tais 51'; Bengoechea 84'

Estadio Nacional, Lima
Attendance: 25,000
Referee: Márcio Rezende (Brazil)
26 March 1996
--:-- UTC−5

Sporting Cristal (Peru)	3–3	(Uruguay) Peñarol
Zegarra 50', 68'; Julinho 75'	Report	Magallanes 14'; Bengoechea 32'; Tais 55'

Estadio Nacional, Lima
Attendance: 16,856
Referee: João Paulo Araújo (Brazil)

30 March 1996
--:-- UTC−5

Universitario (Peru)	1–1	(Uruguay) Defensor Sporting
Carazas 55'	Report	Ra. Dos Santos 52'

Estadio Nacional, Lima
Referee: Pablo Peña (Bolivia)
2 April 1996
--:-- UTC−5

Sporting Cristal (Peru)	0–0	(Uruguay) Defensor Sporting
	Report

Estadio Nacional, Lima
Referee: René Ortube (Bolivia)

7 April 1996
--:-- UTC−5

Universitario (Peru)	1–2	(Peru) Sporting Cristal
Rossi 26'	Report	Solano 61'; Palacios 71'

Estadio Nacional, Lima
Attendance: 21,970
Referee: José Arana (Peru)
7 April 1996
--:-- UTC−3

Peñarol (Uruguay)	1–1	(Uruguay) Defensor Sporting
Bengoechea 64' (pen.)	Report	Ru. dos Santos 59'

Estadio Centenario, Montevideo
Attendance: 33,700
Referee: Daniel Bello (Uruguay)

12 April 1996
--:-- UTC−3

Defensor Sporting (Uruguay)	2–0	(Peru) Universitario
Abreu 24', 44'	Report

Estadio Gran Parque Central, Montevideo
Attendance: 5,000
Referee: Eduardo Gamboa (Chile)
13 April 1996
--:-- UTC−3

Peñarol (Uruguay)	1–1	(Peru) Sporting Cristal
Romero 43'	Report	Palacios 14'

Estadio Centenario, Montevideo
Attendance: 19,000
Referee: Luis Peña (Chile)

16 April 1996
--:-- UTC−3

Peñarol (Uruguay)	1–2	(Peru) Universitario
Magallanes 7'	Report	Carazas 3'; Gonzales 67'

Estadio Centenario, Montevideo
Attendance: 32,200
Referee: Ubaldo Aquino (Paraguay)
17 April 1996
--:-- UTC−3

Defensor Sporting (Uruguay)	0–0	(Peru) Sporting Cristal
	Report

Estadio Gran Parque Central, Montevideo
Attendance: 4,000
Referee: Óscar Velázquez (Paraguay)

=== Group 3 ===
Pos	Team	Pld	W	D	L	GF	GA	GD	Pts	Qualification	AME	JUN	SJO	GUA
1	(Colombia) América de Cali	6	4	0	2	11	2	+9	12	Round of 16	—	2–0	2–0	5–0
2	(Colombia) Junior	6	3	1	2	8	6	+2	10	Round of 16	1–0	—	1–0	5–1
3	(Bolivia) San José	6	3	0	3	6	8	−2	9	Round of 16	1–0	2–0	—	2–1
4	(Bolivia) Guabirá	6	1	1	4	7	16	−9	4		0–2	1–1	4–1	—

Source: RSSSF
13 March 1996
--:-- UTC−5

Junior (Colombia)	1–0	(Colombia) América de Cali
Pacheco 27'	Report

Estadio Metropolitano Roberto Meléndez, Barranquilla
Attendance: 31,500
Referee: Dalmo Bozzano (Brazil)
13 March 1996
--:-- UTC−4

San José (Bolivia)	2–1	(Bolivia) Guabirá
Espindola 12', 22'	Report	Amarilla 63'

Estadio Jesús Bermúdez, Oruro
Attendance: 10,000
Referee: Juan Luna (Bolivia)

19 March 1996
--:-- UTC−4

Guabirá (Bolivia)	0–2	(Colombia) América de Cali
	Report	Máziri 50'; De Ávila 55'

Estadio Ramón Tahuichi Aguilera, Santa Cruz de la Sierra
Attendance: 30,000
Referee: Luis Seminario (Peru)
22 March 1996
--:-- UTC−4

San José (Bolivia)	1–0	(Colombia) América de Cali
Herrera 44'	Report

Estadio Jesús Bermúdez, Oruro
Attendance: 18,676
Referee: Luis Seminario (Peru)

26 March 1996
--:-- UTC−5

Junior (Colombia)	5–1	(Bolivia) Guabirá
Chaparro 3'; Valenciano 20', 85'; Castro 26'; Mendoza 80'	Report	Ceballos 78'

Estadio Metropolitano Roberto Meléndez, Barranquilla
Attendance: 31,500
Referee: Rafael Torrealba (Venezuela)
29 March 1996
--:-- UTC−5

América de Cali (Colombia)	5–0	(Bolivia) Guabirá
Hernández 12'; De Ávila 21', 82'; González 53'; Pérez 77'	Report

Estadio Olímpico Pascual Guerrero, Cali
Attendance: 10,000
Referee: Giovanni Perluzzo (Venezuela)

3 April 1996
--:-- UTC−5

América de Cali (Colombia)	2–0	(Colombia) Junior
De Ávila 75', 81'	Report

Estadio Olímpico Pascual Guerrero, Cali
Referee: Ángel Sánchez (Argentina)
3 April 1996
--:-- UTC−4

Guabirá (Bolivia)	4–1	(Bolivia) San José
Cuenca 30' (o.g.); Ramos 42', 59'; Paz 79'	Report	Paniagua 70'

Estadio Ramón Tahuichi Aguilera, Santa Cruz de la Sierra
Attendance: 3,000
Referee: Armando Aliaga (Bolivia)

9 April 1996
--:-- UTC−4

San José (Bolivia)	2–0	(Colombia) Junior
Vaca 16'; Espindola 22'	Report

Estadio Jesús Bermúdez, Oruro
Attendance: 25,000
Referee: Eduardo Dluzniewski (Uruguay)
12 April 1996
--:-- UTC−4

Guabirá (Bolivia)	1–1	(Colombia) Junior
Amarilla 24'	Report	Valenciano 55'

Estadio Ramón Tahuichi Aguilera, Santa Cruz de la Sierra
Attendance: 15,000
Referee: Julio Matto (Uruguay)

16 April 1996
--:-- UTC−5

Junior (Colombia)	1–0	(Bolivia) San José
Toninho 35' (pen.)	Report

Estadio Metropolitano Roberto Meléndez, Barranquilla
Attendance: 10,000
Referee: Roger Zambrano (Ecuador)
19 April 1996
--:-- UTC−5

América de Cali (Colombia)	2–0	(Bolivia) San José
Hernández 26'; De Ávila 48'	Report

Estadio Olímpico Pascual Guerrero, Cali
Attendance: 11,000
Referee: Alfredo de Jesús Rodas (Ecuador)

=== Group 4 ===
Pos	Team	Pld	W	D	L	GF	GA	GD	Pts	Qualification	COR	UCH	BOT	UCA
1	(Brazil) Corinthians	6	4	1	1	13	6	+7	13	Round of 16	—	3–1	3–0	3–1
2	Universidad de Chile	6	3	1	2	7	7	0	10	Round of 16	1–0	—	2–1	2–0
3	(Brazil) Botafogo	6	2	1	3	10	10	0	7	Round of 16	1–1	3–1	—	4–1
4	(Chile) Universidad Católica	6	1	1	4	6	13	−7	4		2–3	0–0	2–1	—

Source: RSSSF
13 March 1996
--:-- UTC−3

Corinthians (Brazil)	3–0	(Brazil) Botafogo
Leonardo 26'; Edmundo 44'; Marcelinho Carioca 61'	Report

Estádio Pacaembu, São Paulo
Attendance: 26,829
Referee: Márcio Rezende (Brazil)
13 March 1996
--:-- UTC−4

Universidad de Chile	2–0	(Chile) Universidad Católica
Traverso 28'; Salas 34'	Report

Estadio Nacional Julio Martínez Prádanos, Santiago
Attendance: 45,000
Referee: Carlos Robles (Chile)

19 March 1996
--:-- UTC−4

Universidad Católica (Chile)	2–3	(Brazil) Corinthians
Rozental 29'; López 50'	Report	Marcelinho Carioca 36'; Leonardo 51'; Edmundo 75'

Estadio San Carlos de Apoquindo, Santiago
Referee: Ubaldo Aquino (Paraguayan)
22 March 1996
--:-- UTC−4

Universidad de Chile	1–0	(Brazil) Corinthians
Goldberg 45'	Report

Estadio Nacional Julio Martínez Prádanos, Santiago
Attendance: 49,021
Referee: Epifanio González (Paraguayan)

26 March 1996
--:-- UTC−3

Botafogo (Brazil)	4–1	(Chile) Universidad Católica
Dauri 35'; Túlio Maravilha 58', 90'; Bentinho 66'	Report	Caro 53'

Maracanã Stadium, Rio de Janeiro
Attendance: 7,573
Referee: Paolo Borgosano (Venezuela)
29 March 1996
--:-- UTC−3

Corinthians (Brazil)	3–1	(Chile) Universidad Católica
Leonardo 15'; Marcelinho Carioca 41'; Souza 64'	Report	Catê 90'

Estádio Pacaembu, São Paulo
Attendance: 22,758
Referee: José Colmenares (Venezuela)

3 April 1996
--:-- UTC−3

Botafogo (Brazil)	1–1	(Brazil) Corinthians
Dauri 65'	Report	Souza 67'

Maracanã Stadium, Rio de Janeiro
Attendance: 15,971
Referee: Sidrack Marinho dos Santos (Brazil)
3 April 1996
--:-- UTC−4

Universidad Católica (Chile)	0–0	Universidad de Chile
	Report

Estadio Nacional Julio Martínez Prádanos, Santiago
Attendance: 20,000
Referee: Eduardo Gamboa (Chile)

9 April 1996
--:-- UTC−4

Universidad Católica (Chile)	2–1	(Brazil) Botafogo
Rozental 21', 83'	Report	Bentinho 41'

Estadio San Carlos de Apoquindo, Santiago
Attendance: 7,000
Referee: Javier Castrilli (Argentina)
12 April 1996
--:-- UTC−4

Universidad de Chile	2–1	(Brazil) Botafogo
Salas 45'; Silvani 90'	Report	Jefferson 49'

Estadio Nacional Julio Martínez Prádanos, Santiago
Attendance: 40,000
Referee: Roberto Ruscio (Argentina)

16 April 1996
--:-- UTC−3

Corinthians (Brazil)	3–1	Universidad de Chile
Edmundo 16'; Leonardo 51', 76'	Report	Goldberg 38'

Estádio Pacaembu, São Paulo
Attendance: 20,759
Referee: José da Rosa (Uruguay)
19 April 1996
--:-- UTC−3

Botafogo (Brazil)	3–1	Universidad de Chile
Dauri 65'; Fuentes 47' (o.g.); Bentinho 90'	Report	Rodríguez 67'

Estadio Caio Martins, Niterói
Referee: Gustavo Gallesio (Uruguay)

=== Group 5 ===
Pos	Team	Pld	W	D	L	GF	GA	GD	Pts	Qualification	RIV	SLO	MIN	CAR
1	(Argentina) River Plate	6	4	2	0	14	3	+11	14	Round of 16	—	0–0	2–0	5–0
2	(Argentina) San Lorenzo	6	2	4	0	13	5	+8	10	Round of 16	1–1	—	5–1	4–0
3	(Venezuela) Minervén	6	1	2	3	8	16	−8	5	Round of 16	1–2	2–2	—	4–2
4	(Venezuela) Caracas	6	0	2	4	6	17	−11	2		1–4	1–1	1–1	—

Source: RSSSF
13 March 1996
--:-- UTC−4

Minervén (Venezuela)	4–2	(Venezuela) Caracas
Bidoglio 36'; Tortolero 54'; Vera 57'; Echenausi 79'	Report	Díaz 61'; Salisú 70'

Polideportivo Cachamay, Ciudad Guayana
Attendance: 10,000
Referee: Luis Solorzano (Venezuela)
13 March 1996
--:-- UTC−3

San Lorenzo (Argentina)	1–1	(Argentina) River Plate
Netto 68'	Report	Francescoli 61'

Estadio Pedro Bidegain, Buenos Aires
Attendance: 30,000
Referee: Javier Castrilli (Argentina)

18 March 1996
--:-- UTC−4

Minervén (Venezuela)	2–2	(Argentina) San Lorenzo
Are 32'; Hernández 72'	Report	Netto 20'; Biaggio 63'

Polideportivo Cachamay, Ciudad Guayana
Attendance: 10,000
Referee: Óscar Ruiz (Colombia)
21 March 1996
--:-- UTC−4

Caracas (Venezuela)	1–1	(Argentina) San Lorenzo
Díaz 55'	Report	Bernuncio 80'

Estadio Brígido Iriarte, Caracas
Referee: Felipe Russi (Colombia)

25 March 1996
--:-- UTC−4

Minervén (Venezuela)	1–2	(Argentina) River Plate
Castellín 40'	Report	Amato 21'; Crespo 87'

Polideportivo Cachamay, Ciudad Guayana
Attendance: 15,000
Referee: Alfredo de Jesús Rodas (Ecuador)
28 March 1996
--:-- UTC−4

Caracas (Venezuela)	1–4	(Argentina) River Plate
Salisú 4'	Report	Cedrés 21', 74'; Amato 60'; Francescoli 67'

Estadio Brígido Iriarte, Caracas
Referee: Ángel Guevara (Ecuador)

3 April 1996
--:-- UTC−4

Caracas (Venezuela)	1–1	(Venezuela) Minervén
Díaz 31'	Report	Bidoglio 89'

Estadio Brígido Iriarte, Caracas
Referee: Raúl Antonio Pérez (Venezuela)
3 April 1996
--:-- UTC−3

River Plate (Argentina)	0–0	(Argentina) San Lorenzo
	Report

Estadio Monumental, Buenos Aires
Attendance: 15,000
Referee: Roberto Ruscio (Argentina)

9 April 1996
--:-- UTC−3

San Lorenzo (Argentina)	4–0	(Venezuela) Minervén
Biaggio 13', 78'; González 38'; Monserrat 45'	Report

Estadio Pedro Bidegain, Buenos Aires
Referee: Mario Sánchez (Chile)
11 April 1996
--:-- UTC−3

River Plate (Argentina)	5–0	(Venezuela) Minervén
Francescoli 20' (pen.), 39'; Sanvicente 35' (o.g.); Crespo 71'; Amato 90'	Report

Estadio Monumental, Buenos Aires
Referee: Carlos Robles (Chile)

16 April 1996
--:-- UTC−3

San Lorenzo (Argentina)	5–1	(Venezuela) Caracas
Biaggio 15'; Monserrat 43', 55'; Silas 77' (pen.); Rivadero 86'	Report	Díaz 46'

Estadio Pedro Bidegain, Buenos Aires
Attendance: 7,000
Referee: Luis Peña (Chile)
18 April 1996
--:-- UTC−3

River Plate (Argentina)	2–0	(Venezuela) Caracas
Crespo 46'; Villalba 55'	Report

Estadio Monumental, Buenos Aires
Referee: Armando Aliaga (Bolivia)
