= 1996 Copa Libertadores final stages =

The 1996 Copa Libertadores final stages were played from 30 April to 26 June 1996 and consisted of the round of 16 (or second stage), quarter-finals, semi-finals and the finals. A total of 16 teams competed in the final stages to decide the champions of the 1996 Copa Libertadores.

== Qualified teams ==
The winners, runners-up and third placed teams of each of the five groups in the group stage advanced to the round of 16, alongside defending champions Grêmio, who received a direct bye to this round.

| Group | Winners | Runners-up | Third-placed teams |
|---|---|---|---|
| 1 | (Ecuador) Barcelona | (Paraguay) Cerro Porteño | (Ecuador) ESPOLI |
| 2 | (Uruguay) Peñarol | (Uruguay) Defensor Sporting | (Peru) Sporting Cristal |
| 3 | (Colombia) América de Cali | (Colombia) Junior | (Bolivia) San José |
| 4 | (Brazil) Corinthians | Universidad de Chile | (Brazil) Botafogo |
| 5 | (Argentina) River Plate | (Argentina) San Lorenzo | (Venezuela) Minervén |

=== Seeding ===
In the final stages, the teams were seeded according to the pre-established numbering they received according to the final position they occupied in their respective group. Numbers 1, 5, 9, 13 and 17 correspond to each group winners; numbers 2, 6, 10, 14 and 18 to runners-up; and 3, 7, 11, 15 and 19 to third placed teams.

| Seed | Grp | Team | Pld | W | D | L | GF | GA | GD | Pts | Round of 16 |
|---|---|---|---|---|---|---|---|---|---|---|---|
| 1 | 1 | (Ecuador) Barcelona | 6 | 4 | 1 | 1 | 11 | 8 | +3 | 13 | Match A |
| 2 | 1 | (Paraguay) Cerro Porteño | 6 | 3 | 1 | 2 | 8 | 7 | +1 | 10 | Match F |
| 3 | 1 | (Ecuador) ESPOLI | 6 | 2 | 0 | 4 | 7 | 10 | −3 | 6 | Match D |
| 5 | 2 | (Uruguay) Peñarol | 6 | 2 | 3 | 1 | 13 | 10 | +3 | 9 | Match B |
| 6 | 2 | (Uruguay) Defensor Sporting | 6 | 1 | 4 | 1 | 6 | 6 | 0 | 7 | Match G |
| 7 | 2 | (Peru) Sporting Cristal | 6 | 1 | 4 | 1 | 6 | 7 | −1 | 7 | Match E |
| 9 | 3 | (Colombia) América de Cali | 6 | 4 | 0 | 2 | 11 | 2 | +9 | 12 | Match C |
| 10 | 3 | (Colombia) Junior | 6 | 3 | 1 | 2 | 8 | 6 | +2 | 10 | Match F |
| 11 | 3 | (Bolivia) San José | 6 | 3 | 0 | 3 | 6 | 6 | 0 | 9 | Match A |
| 13 | 4 | (Brazil) Corinthians | 6 | 4 | 1 | 1 | 13 | 6 | +7 | 13 | Match D |
| 14 | 4 | Universidad de Chile | 6 | 3 | 1 | 2 | 7 | 7 | 0 | 10 | Match G |
| 15 | 4 | (Brazil) Botafogo | 6 | 2 | 1 | 3 | 10 | 10 | 0 | 7 | Match B |
| 17 | 5 | (Argentina) River Plate | 6 | 4 | 2 | 0 | 14 | 3 | +11 | 14 | Match E |
| 18 | 5 | (Argentina) San Lorenzo | 6 | 2 | 4 | 0 | 13 | 5 | +8 | 10 | Match H |
| 19 | 5 | (Venezuela) Minervén | 6 | 1 | 2 | 3 | 8 | 16 | −8 | 5 | Match C |

== Format ==
In the final stages, the 16 teams played a single-elimination tournament with the following rules:

- In the round of 16, quarter-finals, semi-finals and finals, each tie was played on a home-and-away two-legged basis. If tied on points after the two legs the goal difference would be applied. if still tied, extra time was not played, and a penalty shoot-out was used to determine the winners.
- In the event that the two Brazilian teams from the group stage qualify for the round of 16, the lower-seeded team between these two would face defending champion Grêmio in order to prevent three Brazilian teams from reaching the quarter-finals.
- If two teams from the same national association reached the quarter-finals, they had to face each other, and those teams that had to face them formed another tie under the same conditions.
- If one or more games are settled in the quarter-finals between clubs belonging to the same national association, the Match S1 would correspond to the pair including the lower-seeding team. The following matches would be determined according to the same criteria.
- In all cases in which the order of legs could not be determined, the lower-seeding team had to host the first leg. Defending champions Vélez Sarsfield had to host the second leg in the round of 16.

The above criteria were established to ensure that the four semifinalists would be of different nationalities (Regulations Section III, Article 3).

== Bracket ==
The original bracket for the final stages was determined as follows:

| Round | Matchups |
|---|---|
| Round of 16 (Second stage) | (Home team in the first leg are marked with (L)): Match A: Team seeded 1 vs. Team seeded 11 (L); Match B: Team seeded 5 vs. Team seeded 15 (L); Match C: Team seeded 9 vs. Team seeded 19 (L); Match D: Team seeded 13 vs. Team seeded 3 (L); Match E: Team seeded 17 vs. Team seeded 7 (L); Match F: Team seeded 2 (L) vs. Team seeded 10; Match G: Team seeded 14 (L) vs. Team seeded 6; Match H: Team seeded 18 (L) vs. Grêmio (defending champions) |
| Quarter-finals | (Home team in the first leg are marked with (L)): Match S1: Winner A vs. Winner B (L); Match S2: Winner C vs. Winner D (L); Match S3: Winner E vs. Winner F (L); Match S4: Winner G vs. Winner H (L) |
| Semi-finals | (Home team in the first leg are marked with (L)): Match F1: Winner S1 vs. Winner S2 (L); Match F2: Winner S3 vs. Winner S4 (L) |
| Finals | (Home team in the first leg are marked with (L)): Winner F1 (L) vs. Winner F2 |

Per regulations, the original bracket had the following modifications:

- In the round of 16, Botafogo and San Lorenzo swapped positions. Botafogo had to faced Grêmio in order to avoid three possible Brazilians teams in the quarter-finals.
- In quarter-finals, the two Colombian teams, the two Brazilians teams and the two Argentine teams had to face each other, and the order of the ties was rearranged according to the regulations.

Round of 16
3 | (Ecuador) ESPOLI | 1 | 0 | 1
13 | (Brazil) Corinthians | 3 | 2 | 5
15 | (Brazil) Botafogo | 1 | 0 | 1
– | (Brazil) Grêmio | 1 | 2 | 3
2 | (Paraguay) Cerro Porteño | 0 | 0 | 0
10 | (Colombia) Junior | 0 | 1 | 1
19 | (Venezuela) Minervén | 1 | 1 | 2
9 | (Colombia) América de Cali | 1 | 4 | 5
14 | Universidad de Chile (p) | 3 | 1 | 4 (7)
6 | (Uruguay) Defensor Sporting | 2 | 2 | 4 (6)
11 | (Bolivia) San José | 1 | 1 | 2 (2)
1 | (Ecuador) Barcelona (p) | 0 | 2 | 2 (4)
18 | (Argentina) San Lorenzo | 3 | 5 | 8
5 | (Uruguay) Peñarol | 2 | 1 | 3
7 | (Peru) Sporting Cristal | 2 | 2 | 4
17 | (Argentina) River Plate | 1 | 5 | 6

Quarter-finals
(Brazil) Corinthians | 0 | 1 | 1
(Brazil) Grêmio | 3 | 0 | 3
(Colombia) Junior | 1 | 0 | 1
(Colombia) América de Cali | 1 | 1 | 2
Universidad de Chile | 2 | 1 | 3
(Ecuador) Barcelona | 0 | 1 | 1
(Argentina) San Lorenzo | 1 | 1 | 2
(Argentina) River Plate | 2 | 1 | 3

Semi-finals
(Brazil) Grêmio | 1 | 1 | 2
(Colombia) América de Cali | 0 | 3 | 3
Universidad de Chile | 2 | 0 | 2
(Argentina) River Plate | 2 | 1 | 3

Finals
(Colombia) América de Cali | 1 | 0 | 1
(Argentina) River Plate | 0 | 2 | 2

== Round of 16 ==
The first legs were played on 30 April, 1 and 2 May. and the second legs were played on 8 and 9 May 1996.

| Team 1 | Agg. | Team 2 | 1st leg | 2nd leg |
|---|---|---|---|---|
| San José (Bolivia) | 2–2 (2–4 p) | (Ecuador) Barcelona | 1–0 | 1–2 |
| San Lorenzo (Argentina) | 8–3 | (Uruguay) Peñarol | 3–2 | 5–1 |
| Minervén (Venezuela) | 2–5 | (Colombia) América de Cali | 1–1 | 1–4 |
| ESPOLI (Ecuador) | 1–5 | (Brazil) Corinthians | 1–3 | 0–2 |
| Sporting Cristal (Peru) | 4–6 | (Argentina) River Plate | 2–1 | 2–5 |
| Cerro Porteño (Paraguay) | 0–1 | (Colombia) Junior | 0–0 | 0–1 |
| Universidad de Chile | 4–4 (7–6 p) | (Uruguay) Defensor Sporting | 3–2 | 1–2 |
| Botafogo (Brazil) | 1–3 | (Brazil) Grêmio | 1–1 | 0–2 |

=== Match A ===
1 May 1996
--:-- UTC−4

| San José (Bolivia) | 1–0 | (Ecuador) Barcelona |
|---|---|---|
| Ferrufino 7' | Report |

Estadio Jesús Bermúdez, Oruro
Attendance: 30,000
Referee: Luis Oliveto (Argentina)

8 May 1996
--:-- UTC−3

| Barcelona (Ecuador) | 2–1 | (Bolivia) San José |
|---|---|---|
| Gilson 67'; Tenorio 89' | Report | Rivera 82' |
Penalties
| Gilson (penalty scored); Uquillas (penalty scored); Villarreal (penalty missed); Usuriaga (penalty scored); Morales (penalty scored) | 4–2 | (penalty scored) Paniagua; (penalty scored) Villegas; (penalty missed) Herrera; (penalty missed) Daza |

Estadio Monumental Isidro Romero Carbo, Guayaquil
Attendance: 45,000
Referee: Paolo Borgosano (Venezuela)

Tied 2–2 on aggregate, Barcelona won on penalties and advanced to the quarter-finals (Match S4).

=== Match B ===
2 May 1996
--:-- UTC−3

| San Lorenzo (Argentina) | 3–2 | (Uruguay) Peñarol |
|---|---|---|
| Arbarello 40'; Ruggeri 66'; Biaggio 74' | Report | Romero 48'; Aguirregaray 89' |

Estadio Pedro Bidegain, Buenos Aires
Attendance: 20,000
Referee: Eduardo Gamboa (Chile)

8 May 1996
--:-- UTC−3

| Peñarol (Uruguay) | 1–5 | (Argentina) San Lorenzo |
|---|---|---|
| Pacheco 54' | Report | Biaggio 19', 66'; Monserrat 28', 90'; Arbarello 87' |

Estadio Centenario, Montevideo
Attendance: 32,400
Referee: Antônio Pereira (Brazil)

San Lorenzo won 8–3 on aggregate and advanced to the quarter-finals (Match S3).

=== Match C ===
1 May 1996
--:-- UTC−4

| Minervén (Venezuela) | 1–1 | (Colombia) América de Cali |
|---|---|---|
| Are 48' | Report | Escobar 13' (pen.) |

Polideportivo Cachamay, Ciudad Guayana
Attendance: 12,000
Referee: César Córdova (Peru)

8 May 1996
--:-- UTC−5

| América de Cali (Colombia) | 4–1 | (Venezuela) Minervén |
|---|---|---|
| De Ávila 5', 60', 73'; Zambrano 54' | Report | Rodallega 87' |

Estadio Olímpico Pascual Guerrero, Cali
Attendance: 15,000
Referee: René Ortube (Bolivia)

América de Cali won 5–2 on aggregate and advanced to the quarter-finals (Match S1).

=== Match D ===
1 May 1996
--:-- UTC−5

| ESPOLI (Ecuador) | 1–3 | (Brazil) Corinthians |
|---|---|---|
| Jauch 2' | Report | Cris 4'; Ballesteros 44' (o.g.); García 75' (o.g.) |

Estadio Olímpico Atahualpa, Quito
Attendance: 35,000
Referee: Armando Pérez (Paraguay)

8 May 1996
--:-- UTC−3

| Corinthians (Brazil) | 2–0 | (Ecuador) ESPOLI |
|---|---|---|
| Marcelinho Carioca 26'; Tupãzinho 62' | Report |

Estádio Pacaembu, São Paulo
Attendance: 21,734
Referee: Ubaldo Aquino (Paraguay)

Corinthians won 5–1 on aggregate and advanced to the quarter-finals (Match S2).

=== Match E ===
1 May 1996
--:-- UTC−5

| Sporting Cristal (Peru) | 2–1 | (Argentina) River Plate |
|---|---|---|
| Solano 18' (pen.); Julinho 36' | Report | Crespo 87' |

Estadio Nacional, Lima
Attendance: 27,274
Referee: Epifanio González (Paraguay)

8 May 1996
--:-- UTC−3

| River Plate (Argentina) | 5–2 | (Peru) Sporting Cristal |
|---|---|---|
| Crespo 4', 30'; Francescoli 22'; Ortega 33'; Cedrés 69' | Report | Solano 48' (pen.); Julinho 56' |

Estadio Monumental, Buenos Aires
Attendance: 50,000
Referee: Eduardo Dluzniewski (Uruguay)

River Plate won 6–4 on aggregate and advanced to the quarter-finals (Match S3).

=== Match F ===
30 April 1996
--:-- UTC−3

| Cerro Porteño (Paraguay) | 0–0 | (Colombia) Junior |
|---|---|---|
| | Report |

Estadio Defensores del Chaco, Asunción
Attendance: 15,000
Referee: Jorge Nieves (Uruguay)

8 May 1996
--:-- UTC−3

| Junior (Colombia) | 1–0 | (Paraguay) Cerro Porteño |
|---|---|---|
| Valenciano 36' | Report |

Estadio Metropolitano Roberto Meléndez, Barranquilla
Attendance: 12,000
Referee: Ángel Guevara (Ecuador)

Junior won 1–0 on aggregate and advanced to the quarter-finals (Match S1).

=== Match G ===
30 April 1996
--:-- UTC−4

| Universidad de Chile | 3–2 | (Uruguay) Defensor Sporting |
|---|---|---|
| Rodriguez 20' (pen.); Salas 30'; Valencia 33' | Report | Abreu 18', 66' |

Estadio Nacional Julio Martínez Prádanos, Santiago
Attendance: 35,000
Referee: Cláudio Vinícius Cerdeira (Brazil)

9 May 1996
--:-- UTC−3

| Defensor Sporting (Uruguay) | 2–1 | Universidad de Chile |
|---|---|---|
| Abreu 16', 48' (pen.) | Report | Rodriguez 27' |
Penalties
| Abreu (penalty scored); Chilelli (penalty scored); Romay (penalty scored); Da Silva (penalty scored); Hernández (penalty missed); Silva (penalty scored); Fleurquín (penalty scored); Dos Santos (penalty missed) | 6–7 | (penalty scored) Rodriguez; (penalty scored) Salas; (penalty scored) V. Castañeda; (penalty scored) Mardones; (penalty missed) Galdames; (penalty scored) Silvani; (penalty scored) Traverso; (penalty scored) Fuentes |

Estadio Gran Parque Central, Montevideo
Attendance: 10,000
Referee: Hugo Cordero (Argentina)

Tied 4–4 on aggregate, Universidad de Chile won on penalties and advanced to the quarter-finals (Match S4).

=== Match H ===
1 May 1996
--:-- UTC−3

| Botafogo (Brazil) | 1–1 | (Brazil) Grêmio |
|---|---|---|
| Jamir 66' | Report | Jardel 71' |

Maracanã Stadium, Rio de Janeiro
Attendance: 16,935
Referee: Sidrack Marinho (Brazil)

8 May 1996
--:-- UTC−3

| Grêmio (Brazil) | 2–0 | (Brazil) Botafogo |
|---|---|---|
| Luciano Dias 4'; Carlos Miguel 63' | Report |

Estádio Olímpico Monumental, Porto Alegre
Attendance: 31,200
Referee: Oscar Roberto Godói (Brazil)

Grêmio won 3–1 on aggregate and advanced to the quarter-finals (Match S2).

== Quarter-finals ==
The first legs were played on 15 May, and the second legs were played on 22 and 24 May 1996.

| Team 1 | Agg. | Team 2 | 1st leg | 2nd leg |
|---|---|---|---|---|
| Junior (Colombia) | 1–2 | (Colombia) América de Cali | 1–1 | 0–1 |
| Corinthians (Brazil) | 1–3 | (Brazil) Grêmio | 0–3 | 1–0 |
| San Lorenzo (Argentina) | 2–3 | (Argentina) River Plate | 1–2 | 1–1 |
| Universidad de Chile | 3–1 | (Ecuador) Barcelona | 2–0 | 1–1 |

=== Match S1 ===
15 May 1996
--:-- UTC−5

| Junior (Colombia) | 1–1 | (Colombia) América de Cali |
|---|---|---|
| Valenciano 56' | Report | Pérez 25' |

Estadio Metropolitano Roberto Meléndez, Barranquilla
Attendance: 25,000
Referee: Jorge Nieves (Uruguay)

22 May 1996
--:-- UTC−5

| América de Cali (Colombia) | 1–0 | (Colombia) Junior |
|---|---|---|
| De Ávila 57' | Report |

Estadio Olímpico Pascual Guerrero, Cali
Attendance: 40,000
Referee: Javier Castrilli (Argentina)

América de Cali won 2–1 on aggregate and advanced to the semi-finals (Match F1).

=== Match S2 ===
15 May 1996
--:-- UTC−3

| Corinthians (Brazil) | 0–3 | (Brazil) Grêmio |
|---|---|---|
| | Report | Jardel 14', 50'; Paulo Nunes 43' |

Estádio Pacaembu, São Paulo
Attendance: 31,100
Referee: Antônio Pereira (Brazil)

24 May 1996
--:-- UTC−3

| Grêmio (Brazil) | 0–1 | (Brazil) Corinthians |
|---|---|---|
| | Report | Edmundo 90' |

Estádio Olímpico Monumental, Porto Alegre
Attendance: 46,377
Referee: Cláudio Vinícius Cerdeira (Brazil)

Grêmio won 3–1 on aggregate and advanced to the semi-finals (Match F1).

=== Match S3 ===
15 May 1996
--:-- UTC−3

| San Lorenzo (Argentina) | 1–2 | (Argentina) River Plate |
|---|---|---|
| Ruggeri 42' | Report | Crespo 3'; Ortega 80' |

Estadio Pedro Bidegain, Buenos Aires
Attendance: 30,000
Referee: Roberto Ruscio (Argentina)

22 May 1996
--:-- UTC−3

| River Plate (Argentina) | 1–1 | (Argentina) San Lorenzo |
|---|---|---|
| Crespo 55' | Report | Ruggeri 82' |

Estadio Monumental, Buenos Aires
Attendance: 50,000
Referee: Daniel Giménez (Argentina)

River Plate won 3–2 on aggregate and advanced to the semi-finals (Match F2).

=== Match S4 ===
15 May 1996
--:-- UTC−4

| Universidad de Chile | 2–0 | (Ecuador) Barcelona |
|---|---|---|
| Salas 77'; V. Castañeda 81' | Report |

Estadio Nacional Julio Martínez Prádanos, Santiago
Attendance: 50,000
Referee: Horacio Elizondo (Argentina)

22 May 1996
--:-- UTC−5

| Barcelona (Ecuador) | 1–1 | Universidad de Chile |
|---|---|---|
| Uquillas 56' | Report | Mardones 90' |

Estadio Monumental Isidro Romero Carbo, Guayaquil
Attendance: 85,000
Referee: Óscar Ruiz (Colombia)

Universidad de Chile won 3–1 on aggregate and advanced to the semi-finals (Match F2).

== Semi-finals ==
The first legs were played on 9 August, and the second legs were played on 16 August 1995.

| Team 1 | Agg. | Team 2 | 1st leg | 2nd leg |
|---|---|---|---|---|
| Grêmio (Brazil) | 2–3 | (Colombia) América de Cali | 1–0 | 1–3 |
| Universidad de Chile | 2–3 | (Argentina) River Plate | 2–2 | 0–1 |

=== Match F1 ===
4 June 1996
--:-- UTC−3

| Grêmio (Brazil) | 1–0 | (Colombia) América de Cali |
|---|---|---|
| Goiano 31' | Report |

Estádio Olímpico Monumental, Porto Alegre
Attendance: 37,500
Referee: Óscar Velázquez (Paraguay)

12 June 1996
--:-- UTC−5

| América de Cali (Colombia) | 3–1 | (Brazil) Grêmio |
|---|---|---|
| Bermúdez 39', 81'; Escobar 56' | Report | Jardel 16' |

Estadio Olímpico Pascual Guerrero, Cali
Attendance: 40,000
Referee: Alberto Tejada (Peru)

América de Cali won 3–2 on aggregate and advanced to the finals.

=== Match F2 ===
5 June 1996
--:-- UTC−4

| Universidad de Chile | 2–2 | (Argentina) River Plate |
|---|---|---|
| Valencia 25'; Salas 89' | Report | Francescoli 23'; Sorín 79' |

Estadio Nacional Julio Martínez Prádanos, Santiago
Attendance: 50,000
Referee: José da Rosa (Uruguay)

12 June 1996
--:-- UTC−3

| River Plate (Argentina) | 1–0 | Universidad de Chile |
|---|---|---|
| Almeyda 33' | Report |

Estadio Monumental, Buenos Aires
Attendance: 55,000
Referee: Alfredo de Jesús Rodas (Ecuador)

River Plate won 3–2 on aggregate and advanced to the finals.

== Finals ==
The first leg was played on 19 June, and the second leg was played on 26 June 1996.

19 June 1996
20:10 UTC-5
First Leg

| América de Cali (Colombia) | 1–0 | (Argentina) River Plate |
|---|---|---|
| De Ávila 26' | Report |

Estadio Pascual Guerrero, Cali
Attendance: 45,326
Referee: Óscar Velásquez (Paraguay)
26 June 1996
21:10 UTC-3
Second Leg

| River Plate (Argentina) | 2–0 | (Colombia) América de Cali |
|---|---|---|
| Crespo 6', 59' | Report |

Estadio Monumental, Buenos Aires
Attendance: 73,567
Referee: Júlio Matto (Uruguay)
