= 1996 Copa Libertadores finals =

- Event: 1996 Copa Libertadores
América de Cali	River Plate
(Colombia)	(Argentina)
1	2

First leg
América de Cali	River Plate
1	0
- Date: 19 June 1996
- Venue: Estadio Pascual Guerrero, Cali
- Referee: Óscar Velásquez (Paraguay)
- Attendance: 45,326

Second leg
River Plate	América de Cali
2	0
- Date: 26 June 1996
- Venue: Estadio Monumental, Buenos Aires
- Referee: Júlio Matto (Uruguay)
- Attendance: 73,567

The 1996 Copa Libertadores finals were the final matches of the 1996 Copa Libertadores, South America's primary club football competition. The two-legged event was contested between América de Cali of Colombia and River Plate of Argentina. The first leg was played at the Estadio Pascual Guerrero, Cali, on 19 June 1996 and the second leg was played on 26 June 1996 at the Estadio Monumental, Buenos Aires. Both teams were appearing in their fourth Copa Libertadores final.

Each club needed to progress through the group stage and knockout rounds to reach the final, playing 12 matches in total. América de Cali won their group and faced Minervén, Junior and Grêmio before reaching the final. River Plate also won their group and subsequently beat Sporting Cristal, San Lorenzo and Universidad de Chile to progress to the final.

A crowd of 45,326 observed the first leg at the Estadio Pascual Guerrero, in which América de Cali took the lead in the series courtesy of the lone goal scored by Antony de Ávila. Watched by a crowd of 73,567 at the Estadio Monumental, River Plate tied the match early in the opening half thanks to Hernán Crespo. In the second half, the Argentine striker scored once again to put the home side on the lead. No further goals were scored, thus crowning River Plate as winners of their second Copa Libertadores.

== Background ==
The final was a rematch of the 1986 final which River Plate won 3–1 over two legs. It was both teams' fourth appearance in a Copa Libertadores final; River Plate were looking to win their second title, while América de Cali were looking for their first, after losing three finals in a row between 1985 and 1987.

== Route to the finals ==
The competition proper started with the group stage, contested as five double round-robin groups of four teams, with the top three qualifying for the knockout stages. The reigning champions, Grêmio, were given a bye and thus entered the tournament in the Round of 16. The knockout stage ties were decided based on home and away matches.

(Colombia) América de Cali				Round	(Argentina) River Plate			
Opponent	Result			Group stage	Opponent	Result		
(Colombia) Junior	0–1 (A)			Matchday 1	(Argentina) San Lorenzo	1–1 (A)		
(Bolivia) Guabirá	2–0 (A)			Matchday 2	(Venezuela) Minervén	2–1 (A)		
(Bolivia) San José	0–1 (A)			Matchday 3	(Venezuela) Caracas	4–1 (A)		
(Bolivia) Guabirá	5–0 (H)			Matchday 4	(Argentina) San Lorenzo	0–0 (H)		
(Colombia) Junior	2–0 (H)			Matchday 5	(Venezuela) Minervén	5–0 (H)		
(Bolivia) San José	2–0 (H)			Matchday 6	(Venezuela) Caracas	2–0 (H)		
Group 3 winner: Pos / Team / Pld / Pts; 1 / (Colombia) América de Cali / 6 / 12; 2 / (Colombia) Junior / 6 / 10; 3 / (Bolivia) San José / 6 / 9; 4 / (Bolivia) Guabirá / 6 / 4; Source: RSSSF				Final standings	Group 5 winner: Pos / Team / Pld / Pts; 1 / (Argentina) River Plate / 6 / 14; 2 / (Argentina) San Lorenzo / 6 / 10; 3 / (Venezuela) Minervén / 6 / 5; 4 / (Venezuela) Caracas / 6 / 2; Source: RSSSF			
Opponent	Agg.	1st leg	2nd leg	Final stages	Opponent	Agg.	1st leg	2nd leg
(Venezuela) Minervén	5–2	1–1 (A)	4–1 (H)	Round of 16	(Peru) Sporting Cristal	6–4	1–2 (A)	5–2 (H)
(Colombia) Junior	2–1	1–1 (A)	1–0 (H)	Quarter-finals	(Argentina) San Lorenzo	3–2	2–1 (A)	1–1 (H)
(Brazil) Grêmio	3–2	0–1 (A)	3–1 (H)	Semi-finals	Universidad de Chile	3–2	2–2 (A)	1–0 (H)

América de Cali qualified for the 1996 Copa Libertadores by finishing in second place of the 1995 Categoría Primera A season, the top-flight football league of Colombia. River Plate entered the competition after winning the 1994 Torneo Apertura, the first of the two league titles played during the 1994–95 Argentine Primera División season. Both teams would start their campaign in the group stage.

=== América de Cali ===
América de Cali's opening game of the tournament ended in a 1–0 loss to fellow Colombian team Junior. They bounced back by beating Guabirá 2–0 at the Estadio Ramón Tahuichi Aguilera, but suffered another 1–0 defeat against San José just three days later. Having played all of their away scheduled matches, América de Cali were now to host their remaining group stage fixtures at their home ground of Estadio Pascual Guerrero. They would earn a 5–0 rout against Guabirá and a pair of 2–0 victories against Junior and San José to top their group with 12 points.

Their opposition in the Round of 16 were Venezuelan team Minervén. At the Polideportivo Cachamay, América de Cali tied 1–1 with the hosts. The second leg at their home ground ended 4–1 in their favour, progressing through. They were then paired against Junior. The first leg at the Estadio Metropolitano ended with another 1–1 draw. América de Cali won the return leg, and went on to play reigning champions Grêmio of Brazil in the semi-finals. At the Estadio Olímpico Monumental in Porto Alegre, the Colombian side lost 1–0, which meant they had to pull a comeback in the second leg to reach the finals. At the Estadio Pascual Guerrero, América de Cali started from behind once again after Mário Jardel scored for the visitors. However, two goals courtesy of Jorge Bermúdez and Álex Escobar would eventually tie the match for the hosts, and just minutes away from stoppage time, the former signed a brace to send his team into their fourth Copa Libertadores final.

=== River Plate ===
River Plate's first group stage game was against fellow Argentine squad San Lorenzo, in a 1–1 draw. Their two following matches were in Venezuela, against Minervén and Caracas. They won 2–1 and 4–1 respectively, and sat with seven out of nine points with their three home fixtures still to play. At the Estadio Monumental, they tied once more to San Lorenzo, that time in a goalless draw. Their remaining two matches were won comfortably as they finished in first position of their group with 14 points.

Their Round of 16 opponents were Sporting Cristal of Peru. At the Estadio Nacional, River Plate faced a 2–0 deficit until the 87th minute when striker Hernán Crespo pulled one back. Therefore, they were obligated to score at least once in the second leg. In just over a half hour at the Estadio Monumental, they had scored four times through their attacking line of Crespo, Enzo Francescoli and Ariel Ortega. Sporting Cristal managed to shorten the aggregate deficit to one goal, but Gabriel Cedrés scored for the home team to ensure their progression into the quarter-finals. River Plate then played San Lorenzo. The first leg at the Estadio Nuevo Gasómetro resulted in a River Plate victory, following a 2–1 scoreline. The rematch at their home ground ended 1–1, which sent the home side into the semi-finals, where they faced Chilean team Universidad de Chile. The opening leg, held at the Estadio Nacional Julio Martínez, resulted in a 2–2 draw. The return leg at the Estadio Monumental ended 1–0 to River Plate thanks to a Matías Almeyda goal, which allowed their side to reach their fourth continental final.

== First leg ==
=== Summary ===
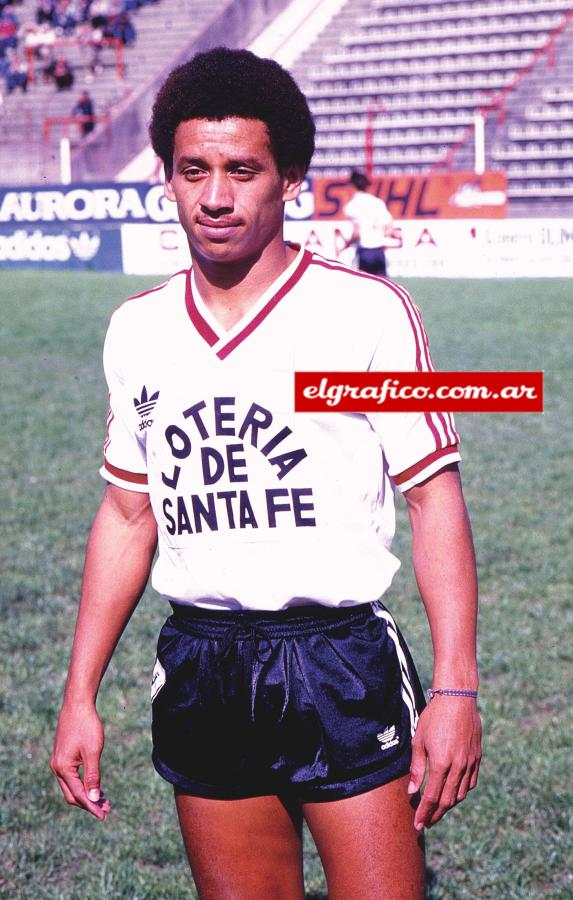
Antony de Ávila scored the winning goal of the game.

The first leg was held at the Estadio Pascual Guerrero, the home ground of América de Cali. The visitors attempted to control possession from the beginning of the match, and funneled danger with free kicks from Enzo Francescoli. The home side replied in kind through Frankie Oviedo, who began to be a nuisance after switching to the left side of the pitch. Right-back Hernán Díaz suffered most, as he failed to tend to his flank, creating imbalances between his team's midfield and defensive lines. Thus, the weakness on the right side of the River Plate defense started to be exploited. In the 18th minute, Alfredo Berti found Foad Maziri on an overlapping run. The defender challenged the ball and won possession, proceeding to filter for Oviedo, who was then brought down by Guillermo Rivarola inside the area. Referee Óscar Velásquez gave the penalty to América de Cali, which James Cardona stood up to take. The defender was unable to convert it, however, as Germán Burgos guessed correctly and dived to save his shot. Nonetheless, the home team would shrug off the miss six minutes later, when Álex Escobar combined with Maziri, who then laid it off to Oviedo. The midfielder followed up by sending a loft for Antony de Ávila, who took advantage of a misunderstanding in defense by turning and chipping the ball over Burgos, making it 1–0.

The level of play would diminish as the game progressed. América de Cali began to count on counter-attacks to extend their lead, while their opposition, although lacking ideas, sought after the equaliser. They would achieve it 35 minutes into the match, when a right-footed shot from Hernán Crespo beat goalkeeper Óscar Córdoba. However, linesman Ubaldo Aquino called a supposed offside, which prompted Velásquez to disallow the goal.

Nine minutes into the second half, Leonardo Astrada was sent off for River Plate, product of a second booking. As a result of being a man down, the visitors adopted a defensive scheme. Ramón Díaz, manager for their side, first replaced Crespo with full-back Pablo Lavallén in the 65th minute. He would follow up by subbing off forward Francescoli for defensive midfielder Juan Andrés Gómez, ten minutes away from stoppage time. América de Cali gave way to a more aggressive approach towards the end of the game, but were unable to find a second goal, thus remaining the score.

=== Details ===
19 June 1996
20:10 UTC-5

América de Cali (Colombia)	1–0	(Argentina) River Plate
De Ávila 26'	Report

Estadio Pascual Guerrero, Cali
Attendance: 45,326
Referee: Óscar Velásquez (Paraguay)

América de Cali	River Plate

GK	1	(Colombia) Óscar Córdoba
DF	13	(Colombia) James Cardona	(substituted off) 56'
DF	5	(Colombia) Jorge Bermúdez
DF	22	(Colombia) Carlos Asprilla
DF	4	(Colombia) Foad Maziri
MF	6	(Colombia) Wilmer Cabrera
MF	14	(Argentina) Alfredo Berti
MF	10	(Colombia) Álex Escobar (c)
MF	8	(Colombia) Frankie Oviedo
FW	17	(Colombia) Henry Zambrano	(substituted off) 70'
FW	7	(Colombia) Antony de Ávila
Substitutes:
MF	6	(Colombia) Giovanni Hernández	(substituted on) 56'
FW	10	(Colombia) Ricardo Pérez	(substituted on) 70'
Manager:
(Colombia) Diego Umaña

GK	1	(Argentina) Germán Burgos
DF	4	(Argentina) Hernán Díaz
DF	2	(Paraguay) Celso Ayala
DF	3	(Argentina) Guillermo Rivarola
DF	19	(Argentina) Ricardo Altamirano
MF	21	(Argentina) Matías Almeyda
MF	8	(Argentina) Leonardo Astrada	(yellow card) (yellow-red card) 54'
MF	18	(Argentina) Juan Pablo Sorín		(substituted off) 78'
MF	20	(Argentina) Ariel Ortega
FW	11	(Argentina) Hernán Crespo		(substituted off) 65'
FW	9	(Uruguay) Enzo Francescoli (c)		(substituted off) 80'
Substitutes:
DF	23	(Argentina) Pablo Lavallén		(substituted on) 65'
MF	10	(Argentina) Marcelo Gallardo		(substituted on) 78'
MF	6	(Argentina) Juan Andrés Gómez		(substituted on) 80'
Manager:
(Argentina) Ramón Díaz

Assistant referees
Ubaldo Aquino (Paraguay)
Jesús Merele (Paraguay)

== Second leg ==
=== Summary ===
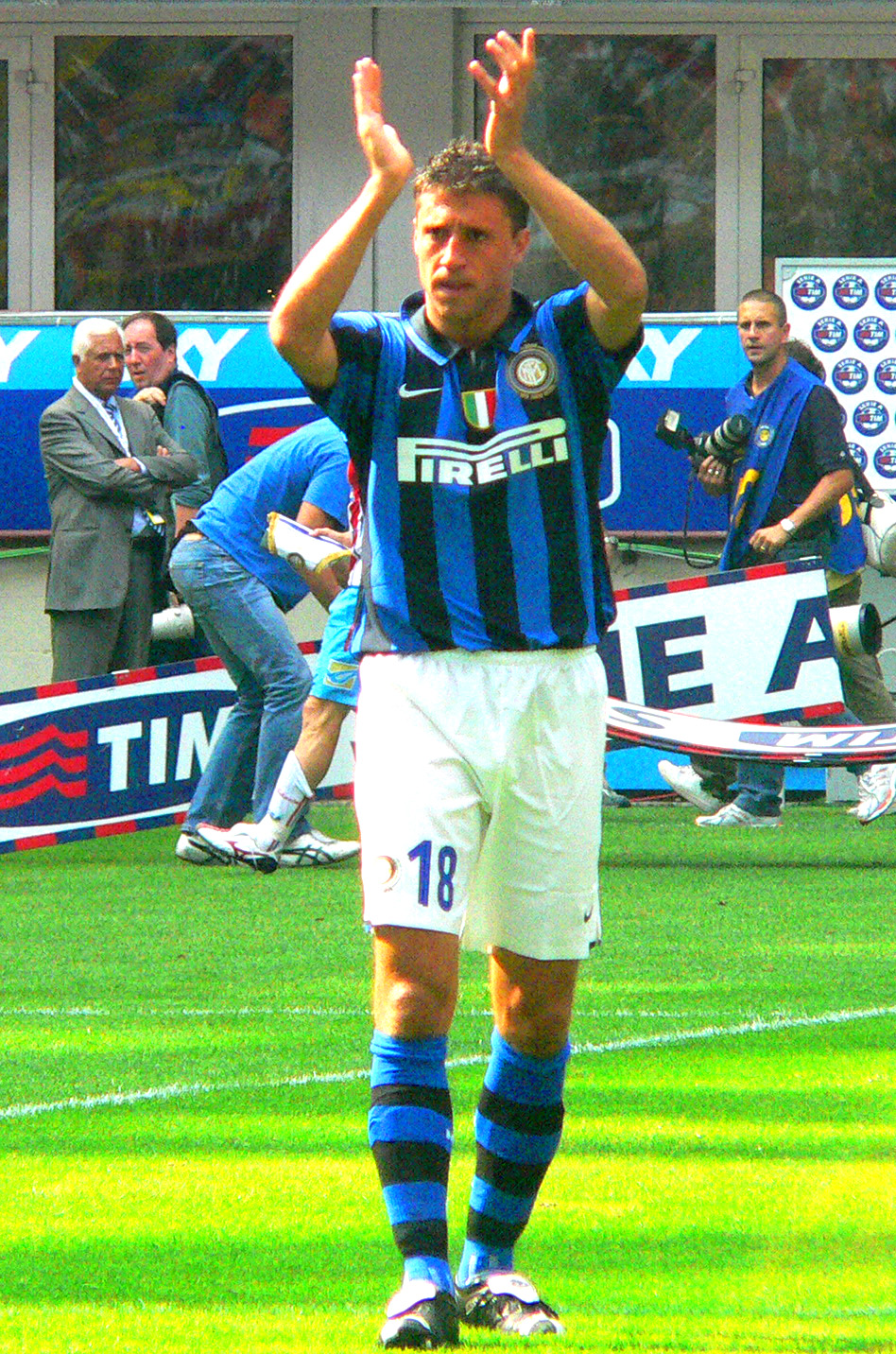
Hernán Crespo scored twice to give River Plate their second Copa Libertadores.

América de Cali's 1–0 victory in the first leg meant that River Plate needed to score to tie the match. At the Estadio Monumental, the home side rapidly established themselves in the opposing half. The visitors stood up to the River Plate approach in the opening minutes, but they ultimately conceded an early goal, after Ariel Ortega orchestrated a play from the right side. The playmaker had received a filtered pass from Matías Almeyda, which he followed up with a low cross into the centre of the box; this delivery was tapped into the net by Hernán Crespo to tie the match. The renewed scoreline would lay tranquility to their side, allowing them to display a fast and precise level of football, with Ortega being the centrepiece of the showing. In contrast, América de Cali lacked ball possession, and their attacking line was isolated from the game. During this period, River Plate made use of crosses to dictate their chances, which they were unable to capitalise upon. They had two clear prospects courtesy of Ortega in the 24th minute and Crespo in the 27th, but Óscar Córdoba stepped up to save both. América de Cali managed to withstand the offensive pressure, and stuck to their initial plan of maintaining possession while progressively making advances towards the opposing area. The home side eventually lost ball control, which prompted the Colombian side to become more incisive. Midfielder Alfredo Berti would step up in this instance, handling the ball and making it circulate with accuracy and precision, while occasionally joining the attack. Nonetheless, the score remained.

América de Cali grew bolder during the opening minutes of the second half, as they started to threaten the goal defended by Germán Burgos. The level of play shown by River Plate, for their part, declined. As a result of their improvement, the visitors created two chances to equalise through their strikers. In the 53rd minute, Antony de Ávila beat the opposing defenders on a run, but he was intercepted by Burgos before he could make a finish. The subsequent rebound fell to Henry Zambrano, but he sent his effort high despite having an empty net. Just two minutes later, Frankie Oviedo laid the ball off to Zambrano, but he again squandered the opportunity after taking too long to muster a shot. Even though the Colombian side looked to be on the verge of the equaliser, the hosts responded at a crucial moment. In the 59th minute, América de Cali goalkeeper Córdoba left the penalty area to make an attempt at playing the ball out from the back. Ortega followed him closely, and eventually pressured him into a clearance, which he fumbled. The ball then fell to River Plate's Marcelo Escudero, who crossed for Crespo inside the box. The striker, unmarked, headed the delivery into the net to extend their lead.

During the remainder of the game, América de Cali continued in their search for a goal, while River Plate battled back by defending their advantage. Although suffering a few scares, they fended off the efforts from their opposition and held on to secure their second Copa Libertadores title.

=== Details ===
26 June 1996
21:10 UTC-3

River Plate (Argentina)	2–0	(Colombia) América de Cali
Crespo 6', 59'	Report

Estadio Monumental, Buenos Aires
Attendance: 73,567
Referee: Júlio Matto (Uruguay)

River Plate	América de Cali

GK	1	(Argentina) Germán Burgos
DF	4	(Argentina) Hernán Díaz
DF	2	(Paraguay) Celso Ayala
DF	3	(Argentina) Guillermo Rivarola
DF	19	(Argentina) Ricardo Altamirano
MF	21	(Argentina) Marcelo Escudero	(substituted off) 74'
MF	8	(Argentina) Matías Almeyda
MF	18	(Uruguay) Gabriel Cedrés
MF	20	(Argentina) Ariel Ortega	(substituted off) 88'
FW	9	(Uruguay) Enzo Francescoli (c)
FW	11	(Argentina) Hernán Crespo	(substituted off) 87'
Substitutes:
MF	6	(Argentina) Juan Andrés Gómez	(substituted on) 74'
MF	10	(Argentina) Marcelo Gallardo	(substituted on) 87'
MF	23	(Argentina) Juan Pablo Sorín	(substituted on) 88'
Manager:
(Argentina) Ramón Díaz

GK	1	(Colombia) Óscar Córdoba
DF	13	(Colombia) Carlos Asprilla
DF	5	(Colombia) Jorge Bermúdez
DF	22	(Colombia) Arley Dinas
DF	4	(Colombia) Foad Maziri
MF	6	(Colombia) Wilmer Cabrera
MF	14	(Argentina) Alfredo Berti
MF	10	(Colombia) Frankie Oviedo
MF	8	(Colombia) Álex Escobar (c)
FW	17	(Colombia) Henry Zambrano
FW	7	(Colombia) Antony de Ávila
Manager:
(Colombia) Diego Umaña

Assistant referees
Eduardo Dluzniewski (Uruguay)
Héctor Bonora (Uruguay)

== See also ==
- 1986 Copa Libertadores finals – contested by same teams
- 1996 Intercontinental Cup
- 1996 Supercopa Libertadores finals
