= 1996 Supercopa Libertadores =

1996 Supercopa Libertadores 1996 Supercopa Sudamericana João Havelange

Tournament details
- Dates: 21 August – 4 December
- Teams: 17 (from 6 confederations)

Final positions
- Champions: (Argentina) Vélez Sarsfield (1st title)
- Runners-up: (Brazil) Cruzeiro

Tournament statistics
- Matches played: 34
- Goals scored: 82 (2.41 per match)
- Top scorer(s): (Argentina) Patricio Camps (4 goals)

The 1996 Supercopa Libertadores was the ninth season of the Supercopa Libertadores, a club football tournament for past Copa Libertadores winners. Vélez Sarsfield won the competition for the first time, defeating Cruzeiro 3–0 on aggregate in the final.

== Teams ==
Association	Team (Berth)	Entry stage	Qualification method
(Argentina) Argentina; 7 berths	Independiente (Argentina 1)	Preliminary round	1964, 1965, 1972, 1973, 1974, 1975, 1984 Copa Libertadores champions
(Argentina) Argentina; 7 berths	Estudiantes (Argentina 2)	Preliminary round	1968, 1969, 1970 Copa Libertadores champions
(Argentina) Argentina; 7 berths	River Plate (Argentina 3)	Preliminary round	1986, 1996 Copa Libertadores champions
(Argentina) Argentina; 7 berths	Boca Juniors (Argentina 4)	Preliminary round	1977, 1978 Copa Libertadores champions
(Argentina) Argentina; 7 berths	Vélez Sarsfield (Argentina 5)	Preliminary round	1994 Copa Libertadores champions
(Argentina) Argentina; 7 berths	Argentinos Juniors (Argentina 6)	Preliminary round	1985 Copa Libertadores champions
(Argentina) Argentina; 7 berths	Racing (Argentina 7)	Preliminary round	1967 Copa Libertadores champions
(Brazil) Brazil; 5 berths	Grêmio (Brazil 1)	Preliminary round	1983, 1995 Copa Libertadores champions
(Brazil) Brazil; 5 berths	São Paulo (Brazil 2)	Preliminary round	1992, 1993 Copa Libertadores champions
(Brazil) Brazil; 5 berths	Santos (Brazil 3)	Preliminary round	1962, 1963 Copa Libertadores champions
(Brazil) Brazil; 5 berths	Flamengo (Brazil 4)	Preliminary round	1981 Copa Libertadores champions
(Brazil) Brazil; 5 berths	Cruzeiro (Brazil 5)	Preliminary round	1976 Copa Libertadores champions
(Chile) Chile; 1 berth	Colo-Colo (Chile 1)	Preliminary round	1991 Copa Libertadores champions
(Colombia) Colombia; 1 berth	Atlético Nacional (Colombia 1)	Preliminary round	1989 Copa Libertadores champions
(Paraguay) Paraguay; 1 berth	Olimpia (Paraguay 1)	Preliminary round	1979, 1990 Copa Libertadores champions
(Uruguay) Uruguay; 2 berths	Peñarol (Uruguay 1)	Preliminary round	1960, 1961, 1966, 1982, 1987 Copa Libertadores champions
(Uruguay) Uruguay; 2 berths	Nacional (Uruguay 2)	Preliminary round	1971, 1980, 1988 Copa Libertadores champions

== Preliminary round ==
The matches were played from 21 August to 2 October.

With 17 teams taking part, the first round consisted of 7 two-legged and a round robin group consisting of the remaining 3 teams.

Team 1	Agg.	Team 2	1st leg	2nd leg
Peñarol (Uruguay)	1–5	(Brazil) Santos	1–2	0–3
Independiente (Argentina)	0–1	(Brazil) Flamengo	0–0	0–1
River Plate (Argentina)	3–4	(Colombia) Atlético Nacional	2–2	1–2
Olimpia (Paraguay)	3–3 (5–3 p)	(Brazil) São Paulo	2–1	1–2
Estudiantes (Argentina)	3–6	(Chile) Colo-Colo	2–4	1–2
Nacional (Uruguay)	2–4	(Brazil) Cruzeiro	1–1	1–3
Grêmio (Brazil)	3–4	(Argentina) Vélez Sarsfield	3–3	0–1

Team 1	Score	Team 2
Argentinos Juniors (Argentina)	0–2	(Argentina) Boca Juniors
Argentinos Juniors (Argentina)	0–1	(Argentina) Racing
Boca Juniors (Argentina)	1–1	(Argentina) Racing
Racing (Argentina)	1–2	(Argentina) Argentinos Juniors
Boca Juniors (Argentina)	3–0	(Argentina) Argentinos Juniors
Racing (Argentina)	0–0	(Argentina) Boca Juniors

Pos	Team	Pld	W	D	L	GF	GA	GD	Pts	Qualification
1	(Argentina) Boca Juniors	4	2	2	0	6	1	+5	8	Quarterfinals
2	(Argentina) Racing	4	1	3	0	2	1	+1	6	
3	(Argentina) Argentinos Juniors	4	0	1	3	0	6	−6	1	

Source: RSSSF
Rules for classification: 1) points; 2) goal difference; 3) number of goals scored.

== Knockout phase ==
=== Bracket ===
Quarterfinals
(Argentina) Boca Juniors	0	1	1 (6)
(Brazil) Cruzeiro (pen.)	0	1	1 (7)
(Brazil) Flamengo	1	0	1
(Chile) Colo-Colo	1	1	2
(Brazil) Santos (pen.)	2	1	3 (7)
(Colombia) Atlético Nacional	0	3	3 (6)
(Argentina) Vélez Sarsfield	3	1	4
(Paraguay) Olimpia	0	0	0

Semifinals
(Brazil) Cruzeiro	3	4	7
(Chile) Colo-Colo	2	0	2
(Brazil) Santos	1	1	2
(Argentina) Vélez Sarsfield	2	1	3

Finals
(Brazil) Cruzeiro	0	0	0
(Argentina) Vélez Sarsfield	1	2	3

=== Quarterfinals ===
The matches were played from 16 October to 24 October.

Team 1	Agg.	Team 2	1st leg	2nd leg
Santos (Brazil)	3–3 (7-6 p)	(Colombia) Atlético Nacional	2–0	1–3
Vélez Sarsfield (Argentina)	4–0	(Paraguay) Olimpia	3–0	1–0
Flamengo (Brazil)	1–2	(Chile) Colo-Colo	1–1	0–1
Boca Juniors (Argentina)	1–1 (6-7 p)	(Brazil) Cruzeiro	0–0	1–1

=== Semifinals ===
The matches were played from 30 October to 14 November.

Team 1	Agg.	Team 2	1st leg	2nd leg
Cruzeiro (Brazil)	7–2	(Chile) Colo-Colo	3–2	4–0
Santos (Brazil)	2–3	(Argentina) Vélez Sarsfield	1–2	1–1

=== Finals ===
Team 1	Agg.	Team 2	1st leg	2nd leg
Cruzeiro (Brazil)	0–3	(Argentina) Vélez Sársfield	0–1	0–2

20 November 1996

Cruzeiro (Brazil)	0–1	(Argentina) Vélez Sarsfield
		87' (pen.) Chilavert

Estádio Governador Magalhães Pinto (Mineirão), Belo Horizonte
Referee: Óscar Ruiz (Colombia)

4 December 1996

Vélez Sarsfield (Argentina)	2–0	(Brazil) Cruzeiro
Camps 2'; Gélson Baresi 8' (o.g.)

Estadio José Amalfitani (El Fortín de Liniers), Buenos Aires
Attendance: 45,000
Referee: Júlio Matto (Uruguay)

Vélez Sarsfield won 3–0 on aggregate.

1996 Supercopa
Libertadores winners

Vélez Sársfield
First title

== See also ==
- List of Copa Libertadores winners
- 1996 Copa Libertadores
- 1997 Recopa Sudamericana
