= 2004 Copa do Brasil =

Copa do Brasil 2004

Tournament details
- Country: Brazil
- Dates: February 4 - June 30
- Teams: 64

Final positions
- Champions: Santo André (SP)
- Runners-up: Flamengo (RJ)

Tournament statistics
- Matches played: 114
- Goals scored: 325 (2.85 per match)
- Top goal scorer: Dauri (8)

The Copa do Brasil 2004 was the 16th staging of the Copa do Brasil.

The competition started on February 4, 2004 and concluded on June 30, 2004 with the second leg of the final, held at the Estádio do Maracanã in Rio de Janeiro, in which Santo André lifted the trophy for the first time with a 2-0 victory over Flamengo.

Dauri, of 15 de Novembro, with 8 goals, was the competition's top goal scorer.

== Format ==
The competition was played by 64 clubs in a knock-out format where all rounds were played over two legs and the away goals rule was used, but in the first two rounds if the away team won the first leg with an advantage of at least two goals, the second leg was not played and the club automatically qualified to the next round.

== Competition stages ==
1st Round
1	Tuna Luso (PA)	1
64	Palmeiras (SP)	3
33	São Gabriel (RS)	2 1
32	Figueirense (SC)	2 0
17	Cuiabá (MT)	0 1
48	Goiás (GO)	1 3
49	ASA (AL)	1 0
16	Brasiliense (DF)	1 3
9	Catuense (BA)	4 1
56	Atlético (MG)	2 5
41	Novo Horizonte (GO)	0
24	Santo André (SP)	5
25	Serra (ES)	1
40	América (MG)	4
57	União Cacoalense (RO)	1 0
8	Guarani (SP)	1 0
5	Maranhão (MA)	0
60	Botafogo (RJ)	5
37	Paranavaí (PR)	0 0
28	Gama (DF)	0 3
21	Palmas (TO)	1 3
44	Remo (PA)	2 1
53	Parnahyba (PI)	2 1
12	Nacional (AM)	2 1
13	Flamengo (PI)	0 0
52	Vasco (RJ)	1 5
45	15 de Novembro (RS)	1 2
20	Portuguesa Santista (SP)	1 2
29	Sergipe (SE)	1
36	Americano (RJ)	4
61	Roraima (RR)	1 0
4	Sport (PE)	2 4
3	Botafogo (PB)	0
62	Corinthians (SP)	2
35	Ferroviário (CE)	4 0
30	América (RN)	0 1
19	Atlético Cajazeirense (PB)	0 2
46	Fortaleza (CE)	1 2
51	Rio Branco (AC)	1 1
14	Rio Negro (AM)	0 0
11	Confiança (SE)	0 1
54	Internacional (RS)	0 4
43	Prudentópolis (PR)	4 1
22	São Gonçalo (RN)	0 2
27	CTE Colatina (ES)	1 0
38	Vitória (BA)	2 4
59	Ypiranga (AP)	0 0
6	Sampaio Corrêa (MA)	0 4
7	SERC (MS)	0 1
58	Grêmio (RS)	0 2
39	América (RJ)	0 0
26	Londrina (PR)	1 1
23	Uberlândia (MG)	0
42	Juventude (RS)	3
55	Caxias (SC)	1
10	Fluminense (RJ)	3
15	CRB (AL)	4 1
50	Flamengo (RJ)	4 3
47	Tupi (MG)	2 1
18	Bangu (RJ)	2 0
31	Barra (MT)	0
34	Santa Cruz (PE)	0
63	CENE (MS)	1 0 (pen: 4)
2	União Barbarense (SP)	0 1 (pen: 1)

2nd Round
Palmeiras (SP)	1 4
São Gabriel (RS)	2 0
Goiás (GO)	2 0
Brasiliense (DF)	2 0
Atlético (MG)	0 2
Santo André (SP)	3 0
América (MG)	1 0
Guarani (SP)	1 1
Botafogo (RJ)	4 2
Gama (DF)	4 3
Palmas (TO)	5 0
Nacional (AM)	0 3
Vasco (RJ)	1 0
15 de Novembro (RS)	1 3
Americano (RJ)	2 0
Sport (PE)	1 0
Corinthians (SP)	2
Ferroviário (CE)	0
Fortaleza (CE)	1 5
Rio Branco (AC)	1 1
Internacional (RS)	2
Prudentópolis (PR)	0
Vitória (BA)	0 3
Sampaio Corrêa (MA)	1 1
Grêmio (RS)	2
Londrina (PR)	0
Juventude (RS)	2 1
Fluminense (RJ)	2 2
Flamengo (RJ)	3 4
Tupi (MG)	2 0
Santa Cruz (PE)	0 3
CENE (MS)	1 0

3rd Round
Palmeiras (SP)	1 (pen: 3)
Goiás (GO)	1 (pen: 1)
Santo André (SP)	1 0
Guarani (SP)	1 0
Gama (DF)	1 2
Palmas (TO)	1 3
15 de Novembro (RS)	2 3
Americano (RJ)	1 2
Corinthians (SP)	0 1
Fortaleza (CE)	0 1
Internacional (RS)	1 1
Vitória (BA)	1 3
Grêmio (RS)	2 4
Fluminense (RJ)	2 1
Flamengo (RJ)	1 1
Santa Cruz (PE)	0 0

Quarterfinals
Palmeiras (SP)	3 4
Santo André (SP)	3 4
Palmas (TO)	0 0
15 de Novembro (RS)	3 1
Corinthians (SP)	1 0
Vitória (BA)	0 2
Grêmio (RS)	0 0
Flamengo (RJ)	1 0

Semifinals
Santo André (SP)	3 3
15 de Novembro (RS)	4 1
Vitória (BA)	0 0
Flamengo (RJ)	1 2

Finals
Santo André (SP)	2 2
Flamengo (RJ)	2 0

Copa do Brasil
2004 Winners
Santo André
First Title
