= Alex Rossi (footballer) =

Brazilian footballer (born 1968)

Alex Sandro Rossi (born 22 April 1968) is a Brazilian former professional footballer who played as a forward. He first appeared in the top-level league with Sport Club Internacional.

In 1992, Rossi moved to Cerro Porteño and, a year later, played in Argentina for Rosario Central and Banfield. In 1995, he went to Universitario but was in bad physical condition, so he spent time on the bench. By the end of Descentralizado 1995 he recovered and help with many goals to get Universitario into 1996 Copa Libertadores. Since then, he played in Osasuna (Spain), and in Brazil again.
