= 1996 Copa Libertadores =

37th season of Copa Libertadores

1996 Copa Libertadores de América
Libertadores 1996

Tournament details
- Dates: March 13 - June 26
- Teams: 21 (from 10 associations)

Final positions
- Champions: (Argentina) River Plate (2nd title)
- Runners-up: (Colombia) América de Cali

Tournament statistics
- Matches played: 90
- Goals scored: 252 (2.8 per match)
- Top scorer: (Colombia) Anthony de Ávila (11 goals)

The 1996 Copa Libertadores was the 37th in the tournament's history. Twenty-one teams participated in the competition. River Plate, of Argentina, won the tournament for their second time. The tournament began on March 13 and ended on June 26.

== Group stage ==
In the group stage, each group was played on a home-and-away round-robin basis. The teams were ranked according to the following criteria: 1. Points (3 points for a win, 1 point for a draw, and 0 points for a loss); 2. Goal difference; 3. Goals scored; 4. Away goals scored; 5. Drawing of lots.

As of this edition, the extra game that was played to define the positions between teams from the same national association in case of a tie in points was no longer held. Therefore, the above criteria were applied to all teams regardless of the national association to which they belong.

The winners, runners-up and third placed teams of each group advanced to the round of 16 of the final stages.

=== Group 1 ===
Pos	Team	Pld	W	D	L	GF	GA	GD	Pts	Qualification	BAR	CCP	ESP	OLI
1	(Ecuador) Barcelona	6	4	1	1	11	8	+3	13	Round of 16	—	3–2	3–2	2–1
2	(Paraguay) Cerro Porteño	6	3	1	2	8	7	+1	10	Round of 16	1–0	—	2–1	0–0
3	(Ecuador) ESPOLI	6	2	0	4	7	10	−3	6	Round of 16	1–2	2–1	—	1–0
4	(Paraguay) Olimpia	6	1	2	3	5	6	−1	5		1–1	1–2	2–0	—

Source: RSSSF
Legend: Blue = home team win; Yellow = draw; Red = away team win.

=== Group 2 ===
Pos	Team	Pld	W	D	L	GF	GA	GD	Pts	Qualification	PEÑ	DFS	SCR	UNI
1	(Uruguay) Peñarol	6	2	3	1	13	10	+3	9	Round of 16	—	1–1	1–1	1–2
2	(Uruguay) Defensor Sporting	6	1	4	1	6	6	0	7	Round of 16	2–4	—	0–0	2–0
3	(Peru) Sporting Cristal	6	1	4	1	6	7	−1	7	Round of 16	3–3	0–0	—	0–2
4	(Peru) Universitario	6	2	1	3	7	9	−2	7		1–3	1–1	1–2	—

Source: RSSSF
Legend: Blue = home team win; Yellow = draw; Red = away team win.

=== Group 3 ===
Pos	Team	Pld	W	D	L	GF	GA	GD	Pts	Qualification	AME	JUN	SJO	GUA
1	(Colombia) América de Cali	6	4	0	2	11	2	+9	12	Round of 16	—	2–0	2–0	5–0
2	(Colombia) Junior	6	3	1	2	8	6	+2	10	Round of 16	1–0	—	1–0	5–1
3	(Bolivia) San José	6	3	0	3	6	8	−2	9	Round of 16	1–0	2–0	—	2–1
4	(Bolivia) Guabirá	6	1	1	4	7	16	−9	4		0–2	1–1	4–1	—

Source: RSSSF
Legend: Blue = home team win; Yellow = draw; Red = away team win.

=== Group 4 ===
Pos	Team	Pld	W	D	L	GF	GA	GD	Pts	Qualification	COR	UCH	BOT	UCA
1	(Brazil) Corinthians	6	4	1	1	13	6	+7	13	Round of 16	—	3–1	3–0	3–1
2	Universidad de Chile	6	3	1	2	7	7	0	10	Round of 16	1–0	—	2–1	2–0
3	(Brazil) Botafogo	6	2	1	3	10	10	0	7	Round of 16	1–1	3–1	—	4–1
4	(Chile) Universidad Católica	6	1	1	4	6	13	−7	4		2–3	0–0	2–1	—

Source: RSSSF
Legend: Blue = home team win; Yellow = draw; Red = away team win.

=== Group 5 ===
Pos	Team	Pld	W	D	L	GF	GA	GD	Pts	Qualification	RIV	SLO	MIN	CAR
1	(Argentina) River Plate	6	4	2	0	14	3	+11	14	Round of 16	—	0–0	2–0	5–0
2	(Argentina) San Lorenzo	6	2	4	0	13	5	+8	10	Round of 16	1–1	—	5–1	4–0
3	(Venezuela) Minervén	6	1	2	3	8	16	−8	5	Round of 16	1–2	2–2	—	4–2
4	(Venezuela) Caracas	6	0	2	4	6	17	−11	2		1–4	1–1	1–1	—

Source: RSSSF
Legend: Blue = home team win; Yellow = draw; Red = away team win.

== Final stages ==
In the final stages, the 16 teams played a single-elimination tournament with the following rules:

- In the round of 16, quarter-finals, semi-finals and finals, each tie was played on a home-and-away two-legged basis. If tied on points after the two legs the goal difference would be applied. if still tied, extra time was not played, and a penalty shoot-out was used to determine the winners.
- In the event that the two Brazilian teams from the group stage qualify for the round of 16, the lower-seeded team between these two would face defending champion Grêmio in order to prevent three Brazilian teams from reaching the quarter-finals.
- If two teams from the same national association reached the quarter-finals, they had to face each other, and those teams that had to face them formed another tie under the same conditions.
- If one or more games are settled in the quarter-finals between clubs belonging to the same national association, the Match S1 would correspond to the pair including the lower-seeding team. The following matches would be determined according to the same criteria.
- In all cases in which the order of legs could not be determined, the lower-seeding team had to host the first leg. Defending champions Vélez Sarsfield had to host the second leg in the round of 16.

The above criteria were established to ensure that the four semifinalists would be of different nationalities (Regulations Section III, Article 3).

=== Seeding ===
In the final stages, the teams were seeded according to the pre-established numbering they received according to the final position they occupied in their respective group. Numbers 1, 5, 9, 13 and 17 correspond to each group winners; numbers 2, 6, 10, 14 and 18 to runners-up; and 3, 7, 11, 15 and 19 to third placed teams.

Seed	Grp	Team	Pld	W	D	L	GF	GA	GD	Pts
1	1	(Ecuador) Barcelona	6	4	1	1	11	8	+3	13
2	1	(Paraguay) Cerro Porteño	6	3	1	2	8	7	+1	10
3	1	(Ecuador) ESPOLI	6	2	0	4	7	10	−3	6
5	2	(Uruguay) Peñarol	6	2	3	1	13	10	+3	9
6	2	(Uruguay) Defensor Sporting	6	1	4	1	6	6	0	7
7	2	(Peru) Sporting Cristal	6	1	4	1	6	7	−1	7
9	3	(Colombia) América de Cali	6	4	0	2	11	2	+9	12
10	3	(Colombia) Junior	6	3	1	2	8	6	+2	10
11	3	(Bolivia) San José	6	3	0	3	6	6	0	9
13	4	(Brazil) Corinthians	6	4	1	1	13	6	+7	13
14	4	Universidad de Chile	6	3	1	2	7	7	0	10
15	4	(Brazil) Botafogo	6	2	1	3	10	10	0	7
17	5	(Argentina) River Plate	6	4	2	0	14	3	+11	14
18	5	(Argentina) San Lorenzo	6	2	4	0	13	5	+8	10
19	5	(Venezuela) Minervén	6	1	2	3	8	16	−8	5

=== Bracket ===
Per regulations, the original bracket had the following modifications:

- In the round of 16, Botafogo and San Lorenzo swapped positions. Botafogo had to faced Grêmio in order to avoid three possible Brazilians teams in the quarter-finals.
- In quarter-finals, the two Colombian teams, the two Brazilians teams and the two Argentine teams had to face each other, and the order of the ties was rearranged according to the regulations.

Round of 16
3	(Ecuador) ESPOLI	1	0	1
13	(Brazil) Corinthians	3	2	5
15	(Brazil) Botafogo	1	0	1
–	(Brazil) Grêmio	1	2	3
2	(Paraguay) Cerro Porteño	0	0	0
10	(Colombia) Junior	0	1	1
19	(Venezuela) Minervén	1	1	2
9	(Colombia) América de Cali	1	4	5
14	Universidad de Chile (p)	3	1	4 (7)
6	(Uruguay) Defensor Sporting	2	2	4 (6)
11	(Bolivia) San José	1	1	2 (2)
1	(Ecuador) Barcelona (p)	0	2	2 (4)
18	(Argentina) San Lorenzo	3	5	8
5	(Uruguay) Peñarol	2	1	3
7	(Peru) Sporting Cristal	2	2	4
17	(Argentina) River Plate	1	5	6

Quarter-finals
(Brazil) Corinthians	0	1	1
(Brazil) Grêmio	3	0	3
(Colombia) Junior	1	0	1
(Colombia) América de Cali	1	1	2
Universidad de Chile	2	1	3
(Ecuador) Barcelona	0	1	1
(Argentina) San Lorenzo	1	1	2
(Argentina) River Plate	2	1	3

Semi-finals
(Brazil) Grêmio	1	1	2
(Colombia) América de Cali	0	3	3
Universidad de Chile	2	0	2
(Argentina) River Plate	2	1	3

Finals
(Colombia) América de Cali	1	0	1
(Argentina) River Plate	0	2	2

=== Round of 16 ===
Team 1	Agg.	Team 2	1st leg	2nd leg
San José (Bolivia)	2–2 (2–4 p)	(Ecuador) Barcelona	1–0	1–2
San Lorenzo (Argentina)	8–3	(Uruguay) Peñarol	3–2	5–1
Minervén (Venezuela)	2–5	(Colombia) América de Cali	1–1	1–4
ESPOLI (Ecuador)	1–5	(Brazil) Corinthians	1–3	0–2
Sporting Cristal (Peru)	4–6	(Argentina) River Plate	2–1	2–5
Cerro Porteño (Paraguay)	0–1	(Colombia) Junior	0–0	0–1
Universidad de Chile	4–4 (7–6 p)	(Uruguay) Defensor Sporting	3–2	1–2
Botafogo (Brazil)	1–3	(Brazil) Grêmio	1–1	0–2

=== Quarter-finals ===
Team 1	Agg.	Team 2	1st leg	2nd leg
Junior (Colombia)	1–2	(Colombia) América de Cali	1–1	0–1
Corinthians (Brazil)	1–3	(Brazil) Grêmio	0–3	1–0
San Lorenzo (Argentina)	2–3	(Argentina) River Plate	1–2	1–1
Universidad de Chile	3–1	(Ecuador) Barcelona	2–0	1–1

=== Semi-finals ===
Team 1	Agg.	Team 2	1st leg	2nd leg
Grêmio (Brazil)	2–3	(Colombia) América de Cali	1–0	1–3
Universidad de Chile	2–3	(Argentina) River Plate	2–2	0–1

=== Finals ===
19 June 1996
20:10 UTC-5
First leg

América de Cali (Colombia)	1–0	(Argentina) River Plate
De Ávila 26'	Report

Estadio Pascual Guerrero, Cali
Attendance: 45,326
Referee: Óscar Velásquez (Paraguay)
26 June 1996
21:10 UTC-3
Second leg

River Plate (Argentina)	2–0	(Colombia) América de Cali
Crespo 6', 59'	Report

Estadio Monumental, Buenos Aires
Attendance: 73,567
Referee: Júlio Matto (Uruguay)

== Champion ==
Copa Libertadores 1996

Second title

== Top scorers ==
Rank	Player	Team	GS1	GS2	GS3	GS4	GS5	GS6	⅛F1	⅛F2	QF1	QF2	SF1	SF2	F1	F2	Total
1	(Colombia) Antony de Ávila	(Colombia) América de Cali		1		2	2	1		3		1			1		11
2	(Argentina) Hernán Crespo	(Argentina) River Plate		1			1	1	1	2	1	1				2	10
3	(Argentina) Claudio Biaggio	(Argentina) San Lorenzo		1			2	1	1	2							7
4	(Uruguay) Sebastián Abreu	(Uruguay) Defensor Sporting					2		2	2							6
4	(Uruguay) Enzo Francescoli	(Argentina) River Plate	1		1		2			1			1				6
6	(Brazil) Leonardo	(Brazil) Corinthians	1	1		1		2									5
6	(Argentina) Roberto Monserrat	(Argentina) San Lorenzo					1	2		2							5
6	(Chile) Marcelo Salas	Universidad de Chile	1			1			1		1		1				5
6	(Colombia) Iván Valenciano	(Colombia) Junior		2			1			1	1						5
10	(Brazil) Edmundo	(Brazil) Corinthians	1	1				1				1					4
10	(Brazil) Jardel	(Brazil) Grêmio							1		2			1			4
10	(Brazil) Marcelinho Carioca	(Brazil) Corinthians	1	1		1				1							4
10	(Uruguay) Luis Romero	(Uruguay) Peñarol	2				1		1								4

Source: CONMEBOL
