= Leonardo Romay =

Uruguayan footballer (born 1969)

Personal information
- Full name: Leonardo Jorge Romay Sánchez
- Date of birth: 29 April 1969 (age 57)
- Place of birth: Montevideo, Uruguay
- Height: 1.89 m (6 ft 2 in)
- Position: Goalkeeper

Senior career*
| Years | Team | Apps | (Gls) |
| 1989–1996 | Defensor Sporting | 76 | (0) |
| 1999 | Tigrillos | | |
| 2001–2003 | Nacional | | |

International career
| 1995–1996 | Uruguay | 2 | (0) |
- * Club domestic league appearances and goals

Leonardo Romay (born 29 April 1969 in Montevideo) is a former Uruguayan footballer.

== International career ==
Romay made two appearances for the senior Uruguay national football team from 1995 to 1996.
