= Manuel Uquillas =

Ecuadorian footballer (born 1968)

Personal information
- Date of birth: 19 November 1968 (age 57)
- Place of birth: Guayaquil, Ecuador
- Position: Forward

International career
Years	Team	Apps	(Gls)
1991–1996	Ecuador	6	(0)

Manuel Uquillas (born 19 November 1968) is an Ecuadorian former professional footballer. He played in six matches for the Ecuador national football team from 1991 to 1996. He was also part of Ecuador's squad for the 1991 Copa América tournament. He was the top scorer in the Ecuadorian Serie A in 1994 and 1995.
