= Eddy Carazas =

Peruvian footballer (born 1974)

Eddy "El Diablo" Carazas
Personal information
- Full name: Eddy Javier Carazas Elías
- Date of birth: 27 February 1974 (age 52)
- Place of birth: Peru
- Positions: Midfielder; winger; forward

Senior career*
Years	Team	Apps	(Gls)
-1995	Deportivo Zúñiga		
1996-1997	Club Universitario de Deportes		
1997/1998	Tigres UANL		
1998-1999	Club Universitario de Deportes		
1999	Defensores de Belgrano	6	(0)
2000	Deportivo Coopsol		
2001	Deportivo Zúñiga		
2002	Sport Boys		
2003	Deportivo Coopsol		
2004	Sport Boys		
2004/2005	U.D. Leiria		
2005-2006	Deportivo Aviación		

International career
1996-1999	Peru	10	(1)
- * Club domestic league appearances and goals

Eddy Carazas (born 27 February 1974 in Peru) is a Peruvian retired footballer.
