= Harles Bourdier =

Paraguayan footballer (born 1972)

Personal information
- Full name: Harles Daniel Bourdier
- Date of birth: 14 August 1972 (age 54)
- Place of birth: Asunción, Paraguay
- Height: 1.78 m (5 ft 10 in)
- Position: Midfielder

International career
Years	Team	Apps	(Gls)
1992	Paraguay U23		
1996–1997	Paraguay	14	(1)

Harles Daniel Bourdier (born 14 August 1972) is a retired Paraguayan international footballer. He played at the 1992 Summer Olympics and the 1997 Copa América for his native country. He also played club football for Club Olimpia.

== International ==
Bourdier made his international debut for the Paraguay national football team on 21 April 1996 in a friendly match against Bosnia and Herzegovina (3-0). He obtained a total number of 14 international caps, scoring one goal for the national side.
