= Carlos Netto =

Argentine footballer

Personal information
- Full name: Carlos Javier Netto
- Date of birth: 24 July 1970 (age 56)
- Place of birth: Lanús, Argentina
- Height: 1.76 m (5 ft 9 in)
- Position: Midfielder

Senior career*
Years	Team	Apps	(Gls)
1989–1993	Argentinos Juniors		
1993–1996	San Lorenzo	95	(21)
1996–1997	Racing Club	24	(0)
1997	Cruz Azul	1	(0)
1998–1999	River Plate	39	(5)
1999–2000	San Lorenzo	12	(1)
2000–2003	Los Andes		
2003	Emelec	20	(1)
2004	Mineros de Guayana		
2004	El Porvenir	7	(0)
2005	Sportivo Barracas		
2006–2008	Gimnasia y Esgrima		
2008	Santiago Morning	6	(0)

International career
1995	Argentina	1	(1)
- * Club domestic league appearances and goals

Carlos Javier Netto (born 24 July 1970 in Lanús, Argentina) is an Argentine former professional footballer who played as a midfielder for clubs in Argentina, Chile, Mexico, Ecuador and Venezuela. In 1995 he scored in his lone appearance for the Argentina national team.

== Career statistics ==
=== International ===
Scores and results list Argentina's goal tally first, score column indicates score after each Netto goal.

List of international goals scored by Carlos Netto
No.	Date	Venue	Opponent	Score	Result	Competition
1	21 December 1995	Estadio Ciudad de Mendoza, Mendoza, Argentina	Venezuela	6–0	6–0	Friendly
