= Dauri (footballer) =

Brazilian footballer (born 1973)

Personal information
- Full name: Dauri de Amorim
- Date of birth: 31 October 1973 (age 53)
- Place of birth: Garopaba, Brazil
- Height: 1.77 m (5 ft 10 in)
- Position: Forward

Youth career
- –1993: Criciúma

Senior career*
Years	Team	Apps	(Gls)
1992–1994	Criciúma		
1995–1996	Botafogo		
1995	→ Joinville (loan)		
1996	Marítimo		
1997	Grêmio	25	(1)
1998	Guarani		
1999	Bahia		
1999	Madureira		
2000	América-SP		
2000–2001	Joinville		
2001–2002	Juventude		
2002	Goiás		
2002	Figueirense		
2002	Náutico		
2003	Figueirense		
2003	Paraná		
2003	Joinville		
2004	15 de Novembro		
2004	Internacional		
2005	15 de Novembro		
2005	Caxias		
2006	15 de Novembro		
2007	Paulista		
2007	Imbituba		
2007–2008	Marcílio Dias		
2009	Pelotas		
- * Club domestic league appearances and goals as of 25 October 2023

Dauri de Amorim (born 31 October 1973), simply known as Dauri, is a Brazilian former professional footballer who played as a forward.

== Career ==
Revealed at Criciúma in 1992, he had notable spells at Botafogo and Grêmio, in addition to CS Marítimo. In 2004 he was one of the top scorers in the Copa do Brasil playing for 15 de Novembro from the city of Campo Bom. He ended his career in 2009, helping EC Pelotas in a promotion campaign to the Campeonato Gaúcho first level.

== Honours ==
Criciúma

- Campeonato Catarinense: 1993
- Copa Santa Catarina: 1993

Botafogo

- Campeonato Brasileiro: 1995
- Taça Cidade Maravilhosa: 1996

Grêmio

- Copa do Brasil: 1997

Figueirense

- Campeonato Catarinense: 2002

15 de Novembro

- Copa Emídio Perondi: 2006

Marcílio Dias

- Copa Santa Catarina: 2007
- Recopa Sul-Brasileira: 2007

Individual

- 2004 Copa do Brasil top scorer: 8 goals
