= 1996 Supercopa Libertadores finals =

1996 Supercopa Libertadores Finals
- Event: 1996 Supercopa Libertadores
Cruzeiro	Vélez Sarsfield
(Brazil)	(Argentina)
0	3
- (on aggregate)

First Leg
Cruzeiro	Vélez Sarsfield
0	1
- Date: November 20, 1996
- Venue: Estadio Mineirão, Belo Horizonte
- Referee: Óscar Ruiz (Colombia)

Second Leg
Vélez Sarsfield	Cruzeiro
2	0
- Date: December 4, 1996
- Venue: José Amalfitani Stadium, Buenos Aires
- Referee: Julio Matto (Uruguay)
- Attendance: 45,000

The 1996 Supercopa Libertadores Finals was a two-legged football series to determine the winner of the 1996 Supercopa Libertadores. The finals were contested by Argentine club Vélez Sarsfield and Brazilian side Cruzeiro and held in November–December 1996.

In the first leg, held in Estadio Mineirão in Belo Horizonte, Vélez Sarsfield beat Cruzeiro 1–0. In the second leg, played at José Amalfitani Stadium, Velez Sarsfield was also the winner by 2–0 totalizing 3–0 on aggregate, in order to claim their first Supercopa Libertadores title.

== Qualified teams ==
Team	Previous finals app.
(Argentina) Velez Sarsfield	None
(Brazil) Cruzeiro	1988, **1991, 1992**

Bold indicates winning years

== Venues ==
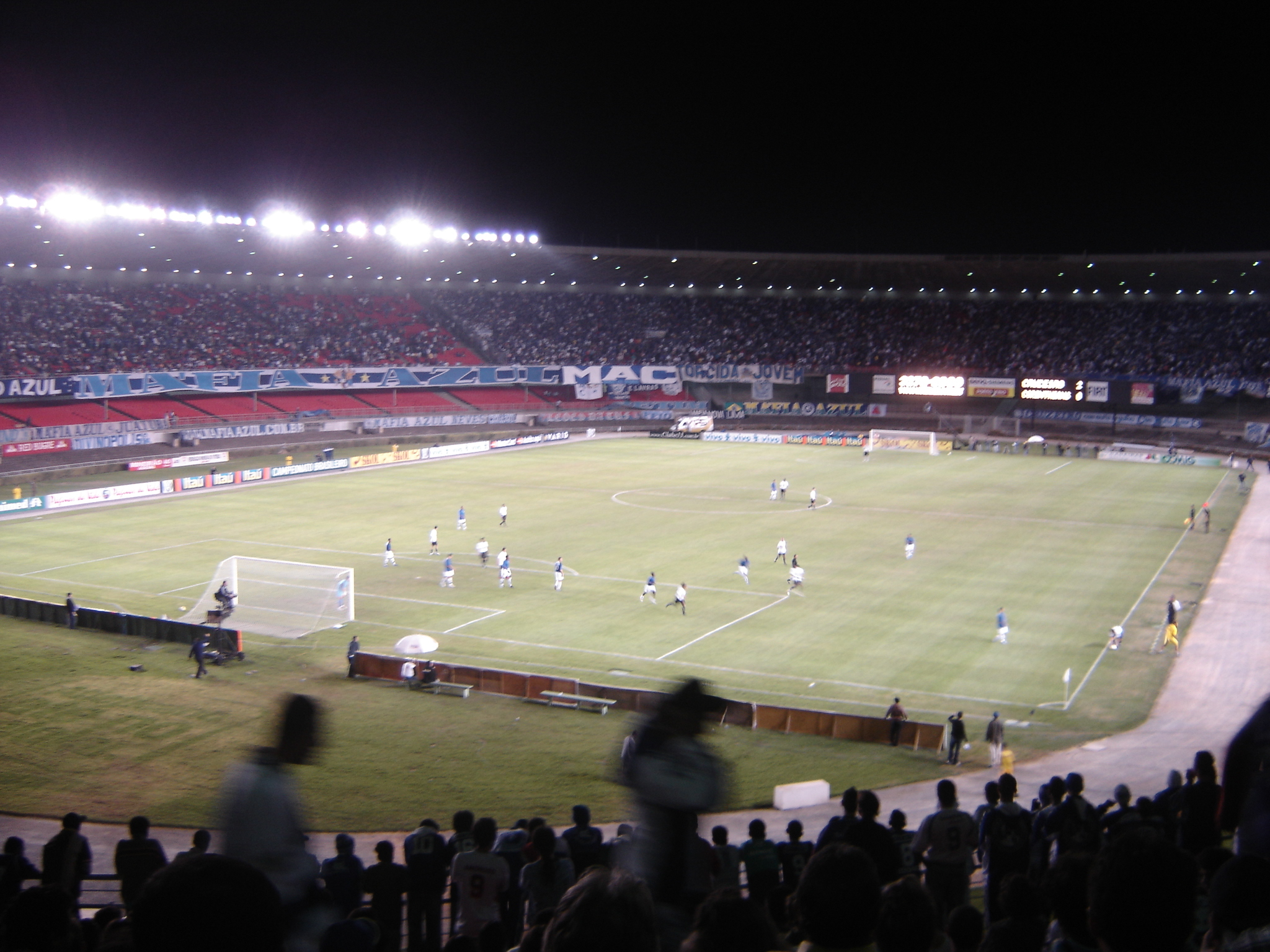
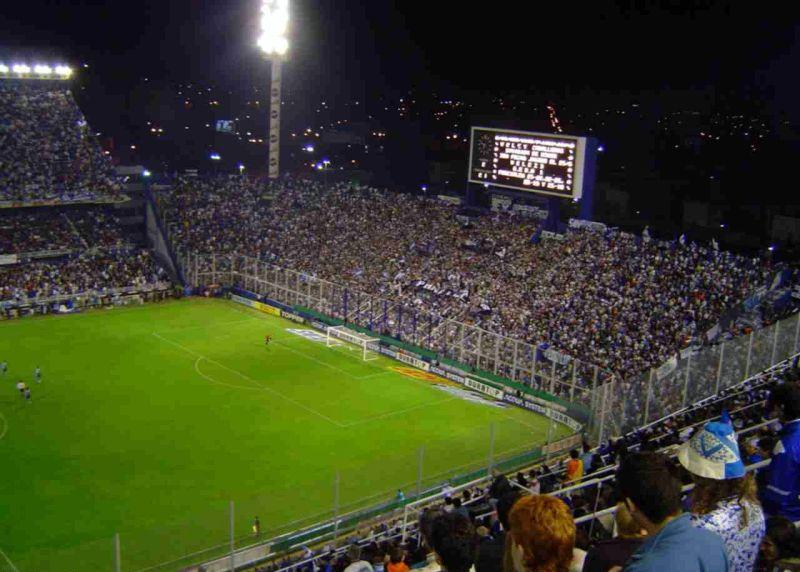
Mineirao (left) and José Amalfitani Stadium, venues for the series

== Route to the final ==
(Argentina) Cruzeiro					(Argentina) Vélez Sarsfield			
Opponent	Agg.	1st leg	2nd leg	Round	Opponent	Agg.	1st leg	2nd leg
(Uruguay) Nacional	4–2	1–1 (A)	3–1 (H)	First round	(Brazil) Grêmio	4–3	3–3 (A)	1–0 (H)
(Colombia) Boca Juniors	1–1 (7–6 p)	0–0 (A)	1–1 (H)	Quarter-finals	(Paraguay) Olimpia	4–0	3–0 (H)	1–0 (A)
(Argentina) Colo-Colo	7–2	3–2 (H)	4–0 (A)	Semi-finals	(Brazil) Santos	3–2	2–1 (A)	1–1 (H)

== Match details ==
=== First leg ===
November 20, 1996

Cruzeiro (Brazil)	0–1	(Argentina) Velez Sarsfield
		Chilavert 87'

Estadio Mineirão, Belo Horizonte
Referee: Óscar Ruiz (Colombia)

**Cruzeiro**	**Vélez Sársfield**

=== Second leg ===
December 4, 1996
Second leg

Velez Sarsfield (Argentina)	2–0	(Brazil) Cruzeiro
Camps 05'; Gelson 8' (o.g.)

José Amalfitani Stadium, Buenos Aires
Attendance: 45,000
Referee: Julio Matto (Uruguay)

**Vélez Sársfield**	**Cruzeiro**

GK	1	(Paraguay) José Luis Chilavert
DF	4	(Argentina) Flavio Zandoná	(substituted off) 79'
DF	2	(Argentina) Víctor Sotomayor
DF	6	(Argentina) Mauricio Pellegrino (c)	(red card) 83'
DF	3	(Argentina) Raúl Cardozo
MF	17	(Argentina) Guillermo Morigi
MF	18	(Argentina) Claudio Husaín
MF	5	(Argentina) Marcelo Gómez
MF	7	(Argentina) Christian Bassedas
FW	11	(Argentina) Martín Posse	(substituted off) 78'
FW	10	(Argentina) Patricio Camps	(substituted off) 71'
Substitutions:
FW	9	(Argentina) Omar Asad	(substituted off) 71'
FW		(Argentina) Fernando Pandolfi	(substituted off) 78'
DF		(Argentina) Sebastián Méndez	(substituted off) 79'
Manager:
(Argentina) Osvaldo Piazza

GK	1	(Brazil) Dida
DF	2	(Brazil) Vitor
DF	3	(Brazil) Gilmar	(red card) 83'
DF	13	(Brazil) Gelson Baresi
DF	6	(Brazil) Nonato (c)	(red card) 54'
MF	5	(Brazil) Fabinho
MF	8	(Brazil) Ricardinho
MF	7	(Brazil) Ailton	Substituted off
MF	10	(Brazil) Palhinha	(substituted off) 73'
FW	9	(Brazil) Cleisson
FW	15	(Brazil) Paulinho McLaren
Substitutions:
FW		(Brazil) Da Silva	Substituted on
MF		(Brazil) Donizete Olivera	(substituted on) 73' (red card) 85'
Manager:
(Brazil) Levir Culpi
