= Claudio Rivadero =

Argentine footballer

Personal information
- Full name: Claudio Alejandro Rivadero
- Date of birth: 28 December 1970 (age 55)
- Place of birth: Bell Ville, Argentina
- Height: 1.69 m (5 ft 7 in)
- Position: Midfielder

Senior career*
Years	Team	Apps	(Gls)
1991–1993	Talleres	92	(12)
1993–1994	Belgrano	32	(4)
1994–1999	San Lorenzo	117	(8)
2000	Gimnasia de Jujuy	17	(0)
2000	Deportivo Táchira	–	(–)
2001	Rangers	24	(3)
2002–2002	Deportivo Táchira	32	(6)
2003	San José	12	(2)
2003–2004	Independiente Rivadavia	6	(0)
2004	La Paz FC	5	(0)
Total		337	(35)

Managerial career
- Deportivo Colón
- * Club domestic league appearances and goals

Claudio Rivadero (born February 24, 1970, in Bell Ville, Argentina) is a former Argentine footballer who played for clubs of Argentina, Chile, Bolivia and Venezuela.

== Teams ==
- (Argentina) Talleres de Córdoba 1991–1993
- (Argentina) Belgrano de Córdoba 1993–1994
- (Argentina) San Lorenzo 1994–1999
- (Argentina) Gimnasia y Esgrima de Jujuy 2000
- (Venezuela) Deportivo Táchira 2000
- (Chile) Rangers 2001
- (Venezuela) Deportivo Táchira 2002
- (Bolivia) San José 2003
- (Argentina) Independiente Rivadavia 2003–2004
- (Bolivia) La Paz FC 2004

== Personal life ==
He is nicknamed Panchito, an affective form of "Francisco", after his father Francisco Amancio "Pancho" Rivadero, a former footballer who also played for Belgrano and Talleres.
