= James Cardona =

Colombian footballer (born 1967)

Personal information
- Full name: James Cardona Bravo
- Date of birth: 30 March 1967 (age 59)
- Height: 1.77 m (5 ft 10 in)
- Position: Defender

Senior career*
Years	Team	Apps	(Gls)
1987-1991	América de Cali		
1991	CA Bucaramanga		
1992-1993	Deportivo Pereira		
1994-1998	América de Cali		
1999	Deportes Tolima		
1999	Millonarios		
2000	L.D.U. Quito		
2001	América de Cali		
2002	Club Olimpia		
2003	Deportes Tolima		

International career
1995-2000	Colombia MNT	3	(0)
- * Club domestic league appearances and goals

James Cardona Bravo (born 30 March 1967) is a Colombian former professional footballer who played as a defender.

== Career ==
Cardona was born in Cali. He spent the main part of his career in América de Cali from 1987 through 1998, except spells in CA Bucaramanga in 1991 and Deportivo Pereira in 1992–93. In 1999 he played for both Deportes Tolima and Millonarios F.C. In 2000 he played abroad for LDU Quito, rejoining América de Cali before going abroad again with Club Olimpia in 2002. He rounded off his career with Deportes Tolima in 2003.

He was capped twice for Colombia national team in 1995, both at the 1995 Copa América, and one more time in 2000, totalling three caps.
