= Juan Gómez (footballer, born 1971) =

Argentinean footballer

Personal information
- Full name: Juan Andrés Gómez Almirón
- Date of birth: 25 January 1971 (age 55)
- Place of birth: Curuzú Cuatiá, Corrientes, Argentina
- Positions: Defender; midfielder

Senior career*
Years	Team	Apps	(Gls)
-1995	Argentinos Juniors	101	(2)
1995-1996	Club Atlético River Plate	23	(3)
1996-2000	Real Sociedad	111	(0)
2000-2003	Atlético Madrid	36	(0)
- * Club domestic league appearances and goals

Juan Gomez (born 25 January 1971 in Argentina) is an Argentine retired footballer.
