= Luis Zambrano =

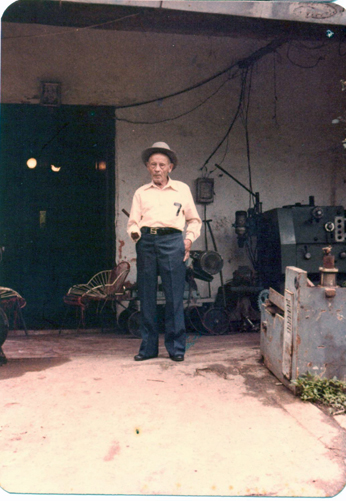
- Luis Zambrano, at his house in Bailadores (Mérida State, Venezuela).

Luis Zambrano (Bailadores, May 1, 1901 – Tovar, August 15, 1990) was a self-taught inventor and mechanic from Mérida, Venezuela.

== Biography ==
He left formal education after the fourth year of primary school, but soon began to develop an interest in mechanics, enjoying discovering for himself the speed ratios produced by connecting oranges of different diameters and rotating them by means of jets of water. These toys lead him to consider new challenges and discover of physical principles in practical ways.

In his Valle Nuevo workshop in the village of Mariño de Bailadores, he empirically and intuitively learned enough about electricity and mechanics to allow him to create about 50 inventions, some of which were commissions, such as a strawberry-peeling machine and a sieve for categorising garlic, and numerous improvements to various different machines, despite having lost his right hand to a saw in an accident in 1977.

He developed water turbines used to generate electricity and to move a carpenter's mechanical instruments such as a lathe or plane. His home was the first house in the area to have electric light, which was generated by a turbine of his own design before the national electric company CADAFE reached his village. For that reason, his hydraulic electricity generator plans were widely used in the villages and houses of the Andes.

In 1933, when electricity was installed in Bailadores, Zambrano had already built three electric sugar mills. In 1950 he installed a hydraulic turbine in Canaguá, which provided that community with electric light until 1.978. He also provided generators to other villages in Mérida, such as Mucuchachí, San José de Acequias, Río Negro and San Antonio de Estanques, among others.

From 1975 Zambrano became known throughout the country due to the efforts of Fruto Vivas and Raúl Esteves Laprea, who created the Luis Zambrano Foundation in 1977 in order to spread the creativity and utility of this inventor's work. The Foundation aimed to stimulate local technology development, founding a school and workshop in Bailadores with everything that Zambrano needed to create and to teach young people in the zone, and creating the Luis Zambrano prize for technological inventiveness, awarded annually by the Ministry for People's Power in Science and Technology (MPPCT), previously known as the National Council for Scientific and Technological Research (CONICIT)

In 1983 he was named patron of the 8th Graduating Class of Industrial Engineers of the National Experimental University of Táchira. In November 1984, the University of Los Andes awarded him the title of Doctor Honoris Causa "for his useful creative work", the first time that this award had been given to a country man. He was declared an illustrious son of Bailadores, and a street in this Méridan village is now named after him.

== Inventions ==
Some of Zambrano's many inventions include:

- Independent discovery of the relationship between the circumference and diameter of a circle, i.e. the value of pi.
- A 600 amp generator used to solder 3/8 rods.
- A large lathe with 13 different thread sizes.
- A strawberry peeler.
- A foundry with its own furnace.
- 20 electricity-generating turbines used in villages, homes and estates to mill sugar cane and thresh coffee and other grains.
- 5 coffee driers.
- A machine used to dry sewage for fertilizer.
- A dual effect turbine with 4 outputs with zero axial effect.
- 3 forklift ropeways with turbines and a carrying-capacity of half a ton over half a mile.
- A garlic sorting, cleaning and sifting machine, with a capacity of 1,400 kg per hour, which earned him public recognition from the City Council of Bailadores.
- A bicycle-powered grinder for grains and bones.
- A vertical drill adapted from a car engine.

Zambrano taught himself the basic principles and construction of hydraulic turbines and double-effect turbines, the transformation of motors from gasoline to gas-powered, the propulsion of aquatic vehicles, jet propulsion and the workings of combustion engines.

From 1950 he dedicated himself to the research and development of his most important invention, a rotating motor or reaction turbine which he named the "Turbozám", also known as a "criole motor". While a conventional motor is constructed from thousands of parts, the Turbozám only has around 20. It uses a single sparkplug and a single four-cycle chamber, and has no connecting rods, pistons, camshafts, valves, carburetor or crankshaft. It consists of rotating parts on a drive shaft that, on rotating, produces compression and expansion aided by the inertia of a flywheel, based on a pair of blades or "bailadores" that act as pistons, named in honor of his village. These blades replace the rotating cam of conventional motors and are driven by a planetary gear system which forms a combustion chamber between the two blades. The feasibility of this engine has been proven by engineers at the University of Los Andes interested in the subject, but has not been implemented, due to lack of support for blade construction. It could rotate at 5000 rpm. He could not finish developing it for lack of support for the construction of the blades.

== Quotations ==
- Don't wait to understand in order to start to do something, start doing something in order to understand.
- Don't let night fall at midday. (Don't stop working in the middle of a job.)
- Impossibility doesn't exist, we decide what is impossible.
- Mad people have opened the way for the wise.

== Patron of the 8th Graduating Class of Industrial Engineers at UNET ==
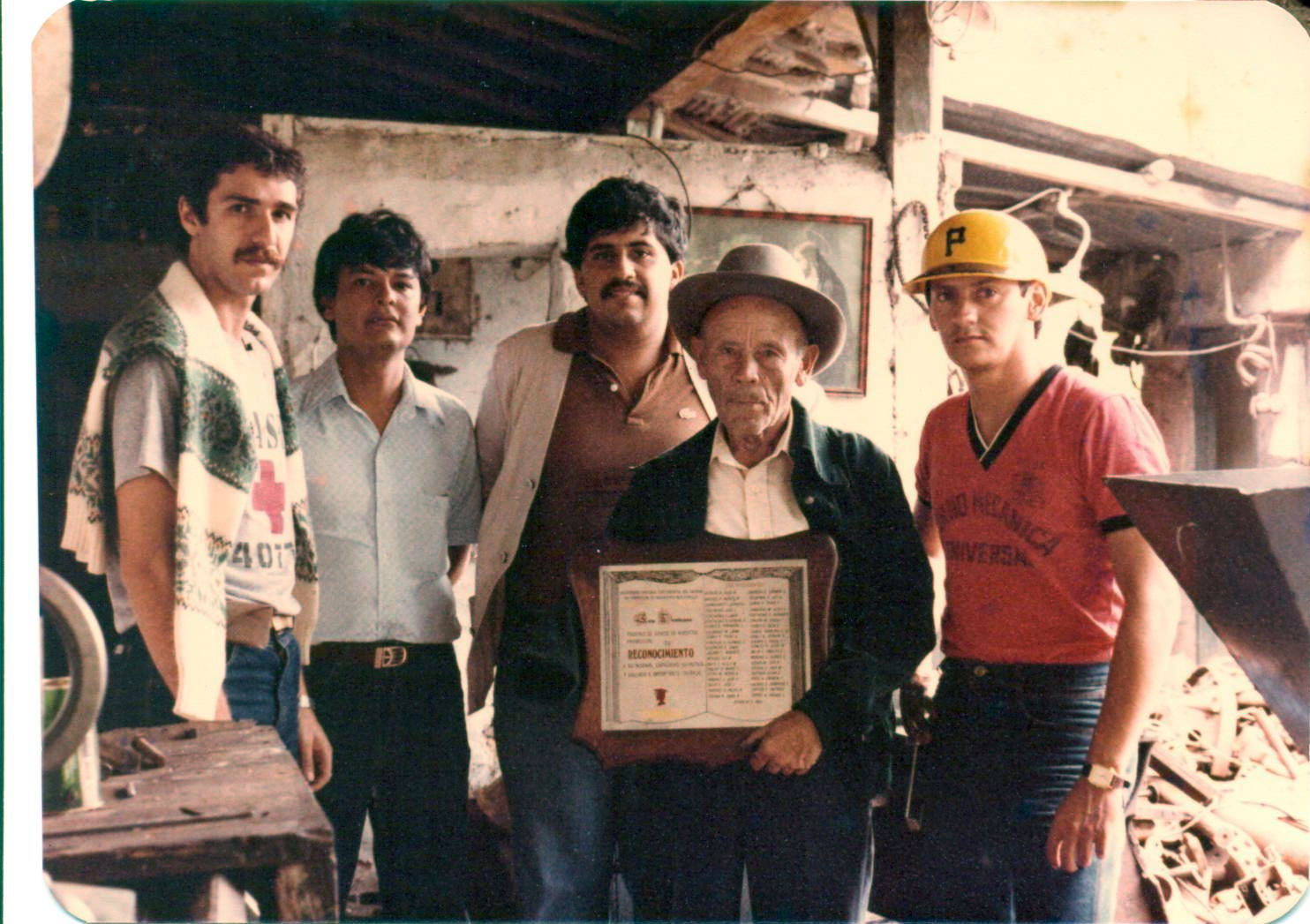
These young people visited Zambrano at his home and workshop in Bailadores to ask him to accept the role of patron. Later, they brought him to San Cristóbal to attend the graduation ceremonies on 26 and 27 August 1983. This is the only known case in which Zambrano agreed to act as a patron.

In 1983, a group of students from the Industrial Engineering course at the National Experimental University of Táchira named Don Luis Zambrano as their graduation patron jointly with one of their professors, Ing. Ind. Juan Jiménez.

In 2008, to celebrate its Professional Silver Jubilee, members of this graduation class reaffirmed their pride in having Don Luis Zambrano engaging as their patron and promising to disseminate his life and work.

== See also ==
- List of Venezuelans

== Sources ==
- IVIC
