= Roberto Monserrat =

Argentine footballer

Personal information
- Full name: Roberto Carlos Monserrat
- Date of birth: 13 September 1968 (age 58)
- Place of birth: Córdoba, Argentina
- Position: Midfielder

Senior career*
Years	Team	Apps	(Gls)
1989–1992	Belgrano de Córdoba	163	(18)
1993–1996	San Lorenzo	109	(22)
1996–1998	River Plate	52	(10)
1998–1999	Colón de Santa Fe	34	(1)
1999–2000	Racing Club	27	(3)
2000–2001	Argentinos Juniors	26	(0)
2002–2003	Villa Dálmine	21	(1)
2003–2005	Racing de Córdoba	18	(2)
2005–2006	Alumni de Villa María	2	(0)
Total		452	(57)

International career
1993–1997	Argentina	4	(0)
- * Club domestic league appearances and goals as of June 2008

Roberto Monserrat
Medal record

Representing Argentina

Men's Football

Pan American Games
Gold medal – first place	1995 Mar del Plata	Team competition

Roberto Carlos Monserrat (born 13 September 1968 in Córdoba) better known as El Diablo Monserrat, is an Argentine former professional football midfielder. He played for the Argentina national team and won several major championships with River Plate.

== Career ==
Monserrat started his playing career in 1989 with Belgrano de Córdoba in the Argentine 2nd division. In 1991 the club won promotion to the Argentine Primera. Monserrat played with the club until the end of 1992 when he moved to San Lorenzo de Almagro.

In 1995, he was part of the San Lorenzo team that won the Clausura 1995 championship.

Monserrat joined River Plate in 1996, he was part of the team that won three consecutive league championships, Copa Libertadores 1996 and Supercopa Sudamericana in 1997.

In 1997, he was called up to play for Argentina in Copa América 1997.

Monserrat also played in the Argentine Primera with Colón de Santa Fe, Racing Club de Avellaneda and Argentinos Juniors before returning to lower league football.

In 2002–03, he helped Villa Dálmine to win promotion from Primera C to Primera B.

In 2003, he returned to his home city of Córdoba to play for Racing de Córdoba where he helped the club win promotion from Argentino A to the 2nd division, where he played a further season.

In 2005, he joined Alumni de Villa María helping them to gain promotion from Argentino B to Argentino A. He retired in 2006 at the age of 38.

== Honours ==
San Lorenzo

- Argentine Primera División: Clausura 1995

River Plate

- Argentine Primera División: Apertura 1996, Clausura 1997, Apertura 1997
- Copa Libertadores: 1996
- Supercopa Sudamericana: 1997
- Intercontinental Cup runner-up: 1996

Villa Dálmine

- Primera C Metropolitana runner-up: 2002–03

Racing de Córdoba

- Torneo Argentino A: 2003–04
