= Rubén dos Santos =

Uruguayan footballer (born 1969)

Personal information
- Full name: Rubén Fernando dos Santos Madruga
- Date of birth: 16 November 1969 (age 56)
- Place of birth: Montevideo, Uruguay
- Height: 1.77 m (5 ft 10 in)
- Position: Defender

Senior career*
Years	Team	Apps	(Gls)
1988–1992	Peñarol		
1992–1993	Central Español		
1994–1997	Defensor Sporting		
1997	Deportivo Cali		
1998	Bella Vista		
1999	Olimpia		
1999	Bella Vista		
2000	Paysandú Bella Vista		
2001	Peñarol		

International career
1991–1997	Uruguay	11	(0)
- * Club domestic league appearances and goals

Rubén Fernando dos Santos Madruga (born 16 November 1969 in Montevideo) is a former Uruguayan footballer.

== International career ==
Dos Santos made seven appearances for the senior Uruguay national football team from 1991 to 1997.
