= Luis Romero (Uruguayan footballer) =

Uruguayan footballer (born 1968)

Personal information
- Full name: Luis Alberto Romero Santos
- Date of birth: 15 June 1968 (age 58)
- Place of birth: Montevideo, Uruguay
- Height: 1.86 m (6 ft 1 in)
- Position: Striker

Senior career*
Years	Team	Apps	(Gls)
1989–1991	Sud América		
1992–1994	Basañez		
1995–1996	Peñarol		
1996–1997	Cagliari		
1997–1998	Peñarol		
1999	Shandong Luneng		
2000–2001	Peñarol		
2002	Central Español		
2002	Alianza Lima		
2003	Central Español		
2004–2005	Nacional		
2006	River Plate de Montevideo		
2006–2007	Cerro Largo		

International career
1996–1997	Uruguay	9	(0)
- * Club domestic league appearances and goals

Luis Alberto Romero Santos (born June 15, 1968 in Montevideo) is a former Uruguayan footballer who played for clubs in China, Peru and Italy.

== Honours ==
Peñarol

- Uruguayan Primera División: 1995, 1996, 1997

Shandong Luneng

- Chinese Jia-A League: 1999
- Chinese FA Cup:1999

Nacional

- Uruguayan Primera División: 2005, 2005–06
