= Antony de Ávila =

Colombian footballer (born 1962)

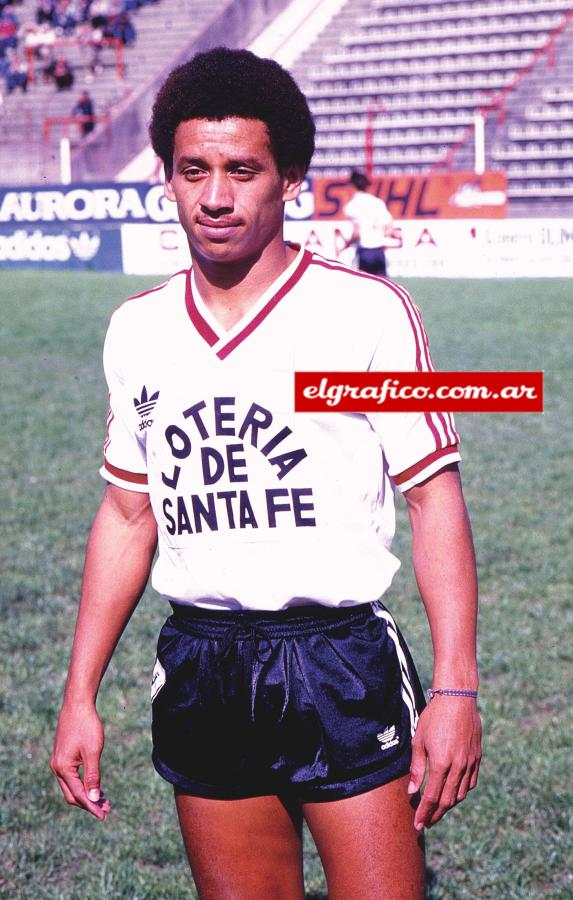
- de Ávila in Unión de Santa Fe 1987.

Personal information
- Full name: Antony William de Ávila Charris
- Date of birth: December 21, 1962 (age 63)
- Place of birth: Santa Marta, Colombia
- Height: 1.60 m (5 ft 3 in)
- Position: Striker

Senior career*
Years	Team	Apps	(Gls)
1982–1987	América de Cali	470 (total)	(201)
1987–1988	Unión de Santa Fe	37	(17)
1988–1996	América de Cali	(see above)	
1996–1997	MetroStars	31	(15)
1997–1999	Barcelona SC	52	(27)
2009	América de Cali	9	(2)

International career
1983–1998	Colombia	54	(13)
- * Club domestic league appearances and goals

Antony William de Ávila Charris (born December 21, 1962) is a Colombian former soccer striker nicknamed El Pitufo ("The Smurf"), who last played for América de Cali.

== Club career ==
De Ávila began his career with América de Cali in his native Colombia in 1982. He spent the majority of his career with the club, winning seven league titles with América, including five in a row from 1982 to 1986. His 25 goals for América in the 1990 season led all scorers in the Colombian top flight. His time with América also led him to be runner-up in the Copa Libertadores on three occasions in 1985, 1986, and 1996.

De Ávila also spent time abroad, playing for Unión de Santa Fe of Argentina in between spells with América, the MetroStars of Major League Soccer, and Barcelona SC of Ecuador.

De Ávila's MLS career spanned a season and a half, as he joined the Metros midway through the 1996 season as a replacement for colossal disappointment Rubén Darío Hernández. With the club playing on AstroTurf for parts of the season, El Pitufo was surprisingly adept at what was called "ping-pong soccer". He scored 15 goals and added 11 assists in his time in the league, plus another two goals and an assist in the playoffs.

In 1997, De Ávila left the MLS and moved to Ecuador to play for Barcelona de Ecuador. With the club, he reached another Copa Libertadores final but again failed to win, becoming the only player to have lost five Libertadores finals.

De Ávila retired in 1999, but returned to competitive football at the age of 46 with América de Cali, eventually finishing his career with a club record 208 goals.

His 29 goals in the Copa Libertadores ranked him sixth highest scorer in the history of the tournament.

== International career ==
De Ávila made his senior debut on July 26, 1983. He went on to score 13 goals in 54 appearances for the Colombia national team between 1983 and 1998. He represented his country at two World Cups, in 1994 and 1998 respectively.

== Personal life ==
Nicknamed El Pitufo ("The Smurf") or El Pipa, he was known as much for his short height of 1.57m (5 ft 3 in) as for his goal-scoring prowess. After retiring, de Ávila bought a farm and he was still living there as of 2020.

== Career statistics ==
Scores and results list goal tally first.

Scores and results list Colombia's goal tally first, score column indicates score after each de Ávila goal.

List of international goals scored by Antony de Ávila
No.	Date	Venue	Opponent	Score	Result	Competition
1	June 27, 1989	Miami Orange Bowl, Miami, United States	Haiti	4–0	4–0	Friendly
2	July 3, 1989	Estádio Fonte Nova, Salvador, Brazil	Venezuela	3–0	4–2	1989 Copa América
3	February 3, 1991	Miami Orange Bowl, Miami, United States	Switzerland	2–0	2–3	1991 Miami Cup
4	June 25, 1991	Estadio Nacional, San José, Costa Rica	Costa Rica	1–0	1–0	Friendly
5	July 7, 1991	Estadio Playa Ancha, Valparaíso, Chile	Ecuador	1–0	1–0	1991 Copa América
6	July 13, 1991	Estadio Sausalito, Viña del Mar, Chile	Brazil	1–0	2–0	1991 Copa América
7	July 21, 1991	Estadio Nacional Julio Martínez Prádanos, Santiago, Chile	Argentina	1–2	1–2	1991 Copa América
8	March 31, 1993	Estadio Atanasio Girardot, Medellín, Colombia	Costa Rica	2–0	4–1	Friendly
9	April 17, 1994	Estadio Centenario, Armenia, Colombia	Nigeria	1–0	1–0	Friendly
10	May 5, 1994	Miami Orange Bowl, Miami, United States	El Salvador	2–0	3–0	1994 Miami Cup
11	July 7, 1996	Estadio Metropolitano Roberto Meléndez, Barranquilla, Colombia	Uruguay	3–1	3–1	1998 FIFA World Cup qualification
12	July 20, 1997	Estadio Metropolitano Roberto Meléndez, Barranquilla, Colombia	Ecuador	1–0	1–0	1998 FIFA World Cup qualification
13	August 20, 1997	Estadio Metropolitano Roberto Meléndez, Barranquilla, Colombia	Bolivia	1–0	3–0	1998 FIFA World Cup qualification

== Honours ==
América de Cali

- Categoría Primera A: 1982, 1983, 1984, 1985, 1986, 1990, 1992
- Copa Libertadores runner-up: 1985, 1986, 1996

Barcelona de Ecuador

- Ecuadorian Serie A: 1997
- Copa Libertadores runner-up: 1998

Individual

- Categoría Primera A top scorer: 1990
- Copa Libertadores top scorer: 1996
