= Eduardo Dluzniewski =

Uruguayan football referee

- Born: 22 September 1952 (age 74); Uruguay

International
Years	League	Role
1989–1997	FIFA listed	Referee

Eduardo Dluzniewski (born September 22, 1952) is a former Uruguayan football referee. He is known for having supervised two matches during the 1995 Copa América in Uruguay: Argentina vs. Bolivia (2-1) and Ecuador vs. Peru (2-1).

Dluzniewski also officiated in 1998 World Cup qualifiers.
