= Minervén S.C. =

Venezuelan football club

Minervén SC
- Full name: Minervén Sport Club
- Nicknames: El Expreso Azul; El Ballet Azul; El Expreso Sur
- Founded: January 15, 1985; 40 years ago
- Dissolved: January 2022; 4 years ago
- Ground: Estadio Hector Thomas; El Callao, Venezuela; Polideportivo Cachamay; Puerto Ordaz, Venezuela
- Capacity: 42,500
- Chairman: Luciano Chávez
- Manager: José Hernández
- League: Tercera División Venezolana
Home colours	Away colours

Minervén Sport Club, formerly Minervén Bolívar Fútbol Club, usually known as Minervén, was a Venezuelan football club.

== History ==
The club was founded on January 15, 1985, in Puerto Ordaz. In 2004 were replaced by Club Deportivo Iberoamericano. On July 27, 2007, they changed the name again to Minervén Bolívar Fútbol Club. The ran into financial trouble and changed their name to Minervén Sport Club, after re-starting from the lowest professional division in 2015. They folded in 2022.

== Stadium ==
The club plays their home matches at Estadio Hector Thomas, in the city of El Callao, which has a maximum capacity of 5,000 people. In the golden era of the club, the high-profile games or those in continental competitions, where played at Polideportivo Cachamay in Ciudad Guayana. The later is shared with Mineros de Guayana, another football club of Bolívar state, and Minerven's biggest rival.

== Titles ==
- Primera División Venezolana: 1

1995-96

== Performance in CONMEBOL competitions ==
Former logo

Former logo

- Copa Libertadores: 4 appearances

1993: Round of 16
1994: Quarter-Finals
1996: Round of 16
1997: Round of 16

- Copa CONMEBOL: 1 appearance

1994: Quarter-Finals
