= Atlético Nacional in international tournaments =

Atlético Nacional is a professional Colombian football team based in Medellín. Considered to be one of the strongest clubs from Colombia, it is one of the most consistent clubs in the country. Atlético Nacional was founded in 1947 by Julio Ortiz, Jorge Osorio Cadavid, Jorge Gómez, Arturo Torres, Gilberto Molina, Alberto Eastman, Raúl Zapata Lotero and Luis Alberto Villegas Lopera.

This is a list of international competitions in which Atlético Nacional has played with its respective matches.

== Performance in international competitions ==
Season	Competition	Round	Opponent	Home	Away	Pen.
1972	Copa Simón Bolívar	SF	(Colombia) Deportivo Cali	2–1	1–1	—
1972	Copa Simón Bolívar	F	(Venezuela) Deportivo Galicia	0–1	1–0	—
1972	Copa Simón Bolívar	PO	(Venezuela) Deportivo Galicia	2–2		2–3 (a)
1972	Copa Libertadores	FS	(Colombia) Santa Fe	0–1	1–1	—
1972	Copa Libertadores	FS	(Argentina) Independiente	1–1	0–2	—
1972	Copa Libertadores	FS	(Argentina) Rosario Central	0–1	1–3	—
1974	Copa Libertadores	FS	(Colombia) Millonarios	0–3	1–2	—
1974	Copa Libertadores	FS	(Venezuela) Portuguesa	3–0	0–0	—
1974	Copa Libertadores	FS	(Venezuela) Valencia	2–1	2–1	—
1975	Copa Libertadores	FS	(Colombia) Deportivo Cali	2–1	0–0	—
1975	Copa Libertadores	FS	(Brazil) Vasco da Gama	1–1	0–2	—
1975	Copa Libertadores	FS	(Brazil) Cruzeiro	1–2	3–2	—
1975	Copa Simón Bolívar	F	(Peru) Defensor Lima	0–0		5–6 (h)
1975	Copa Simón Bolívar	F	(Venezuela) Portuguesa	2–3		—
1975	Copa Simón Bolívar	F	(Ecuador) El Nacional	0–1		—
1977	Copa Libertadores	FS	(Colombia) Deportivo Cali	0–3	1–3	—
1977	Copa Libertadores	FS	(Bolivia) Oriente Petrolero	3–1	0–4	—
1977	Copa Libertadores	FS	(Bolivia) Bolívar	1–0	0–3	—
1982	Copa Libertadores	FS	(Colombia) Deportes Tolima	0–3	0–0	—
1982	Copa Libertadores	FS	(Venezuela) Estudiantes de Mérida	2–0	3–1	—
1982	Copa Libertadores	FS	(Venezuela) Deportivo Táchira	1–0	0–0	—
1989	Copa Libertadores	FS	(Colombia) Millonarios	0–2	1–1	—
1989	Copa Libertadores	FS	(Ecuador) Emelec	2–1	1–1	—
1989	Copa Libertadores	FS	(Ecuador) Deportivo Quito	3–1	1–1	—
1989	Copa Libertadores	R16	(Argentina) Racing Club	2–0	1–2	—
1989	Copa Libertadores	QF	(Colombia) Millonarios	1–0	1–1	—
1989	Copa Libertadores	SF	(Uruguay) Danubio	6–0	0–0	—
1989	Copa Libertadores	F	(Paraguay) Olimpia	2–0	0–2	5–4 (h)
1989	Intercontinental Cup		(Italy) Milan	0–1		—
1989	Supercopa Libertadores	R16	(Uruguay) Nacional	2–0	1–2	—
1989	Supercopa Libertadores	QF	(Argentina) Independiente	2–2	0–2	—
1989	Copa Interamericana		(Mexico) UNAM	2–0	4–1	—
1990	Recopa Sudamericana		(Argentina) Boca Juniors	0–1		—
1990	Copa Libertadores	R16	(Paraguay) Cerro Porteño	1–0	0–0	—
1990	Copa Libertadores	QF	(Brazil) Vasco da Gama	1–0	0–0	—
1990	Copa Libertadores	SF	(Paraguay) Olimpia	1–2	3–2	1–2 (a)
1991	Copa Libertadores	GS	(Colombia) América de Cali	0–2	0–1	—
1991	Copa Libertadores	GS	(Venezuela) Marítimo	2–2	3–1	—
1991	Copa Libertadores	GS	(Venezuela) Unión Táchira	0–0	2–1	—
1991	Copa Libertadores	R16	(Ecuador) LDU Quito	2–0	2–2	—
1991	Copa Libertadores	QF	(Colombia) América de Cali	2–0	0–0	—
1991	Copa Libertadores	SF	(Paraguay) Olimpia	0–0	0–1	—
1992	Copa Libertadores	GS	(Colombia) América de Cali	3–0	0–2	—
1992	Copa Libertadores	GS	(Peru) Sport Boys	2–2	6–0	—
1992	Copa Libertadores	GS	(Peru) Sporting Cristal	1–0	3–0	—
1992	Copa Libertadores	R16	(Venezuela) Marítimo	3–0	0–0	—
1992	Copa Libertadores	QF	(Colombia) América de Cali	0–1	2–4	—
1992	Supercopa Libertadores	R16	(Brazil) Cruzeiro	1–1	0–8	—
1993	Copa Libertadores	GS	(Colombia) América de Cali	3–2	3–0	—
1993	Copa Libertadores	GS	(Brazil) Flamengo	0–1	1–3	—
1993	Copa Libertadores	GS	(Brazil) Internacional	0–0	1–0	—
1993	Copa Libertadores	PO	(Colombia) América de Cali	—	2–4	—
1993	Copa Libertadores	R16	(Chile) Universidad Católica	2–1	0–2	—
1993	Supercopa Libertadores	R16	(Brazil) Santos	1–0	0–0	—
1993	Supercopa Libertadores	QF	(Argentina) Estudiantes	1–0	1–0	—
1993	Supercopa Libertadores	SF	(Brazil) São Paulo	2–1	0–1	4–5 (h)
1994	Supercopa Libertadores	R16	(Brazil) São Paulo	0–2	1–1	—
1995	Copa Libertadores	GS	(Colombia) Millonarios	0–0	0–2	—
1995	Copa Libertadores	GS	(Chile) Universidad Católica	3–1	1–1	—
1995	Copa Libertadores	GS	Universidad de Chile	1–0	0–0	—
1995	Copa Libertadores	R16	(Uruguay) Peñarol	3–1	3–1	—
1995	Copa Libertadores	QF	(Colombia) Millonarios	2–1	1–1	—
1995	Copa Libertadores	SF	(Argentina) River Plate	1–0	0–1	8–7 (a)
1995	Copa Libertadores	F	(Brazil) Grêmio	1–1	1–3	—
1995	Supercopa Libertadores	FS	(Argentina) Argentinos Juniors	3–1	2–1	—
1995	Supercopa Libertadores	QF	(Argentina) Independiente	1–0	0–2	—
1996	Supercopa Libertadores	FS	(Argentina) River Plate	2–1	2–2	—
1996	Supercopa Libertadores	QF	(Brazil) Santos	3–1	0–2	6–7 (h)
1995	Copa Interamericana		(Costa Rica) Deportivo Saprissa	2–3		—
1997	Supercopa Libertadores	FS	(Argentina) Estudiantes	2–0	0–1	—
1997	Supercopa Libertadores	FS	(Uruguay) Peñarol	1–0	1–3	—
1997	Supercopa Libertadores	FS	(Brazil) Grêmio	3–1	2–2	—
1997	Supercopa Libertadores	SF	(Argentina) River Plate	2–1	0–2	—
1998	Copa Merconorte	FS	(Bolivia) The Strongest	2–3	2–0	—
1998	Copa Merconorte	FS	(Peru) Alianza Lima	3–1	1–1	—
1998	Copa Merconorte	FS	(Ecuador) Barcelona	4–0	2–2	—
1998	Copa Merconorte	SF	(Colombia) Millonarios	1–2	2–0	—
1998	Copa Merconorte	F	(Colombia) Deportivo Cali	3–1	1–0	—
1999	Copa Merconorte	FS	(Colombia) América de Cali	2–3	1–1	—
1999	Copa Merconorte	FS	(Ecuador) El Nacional	4–0	2–3	—
1999	Copa Merconorte	FS	(Peru) Universitario	0–0	2–2	—
2000	Copa Libertadores	GS	Universidad de Chile	4–1	0–4	—
2000	Copa Libertadores	GS	(Mexico) Atlas	2–3	1–5	—
2000	Copa Libertadores	GS	(Argentina) River Plate	1–1	3–2	—
2000	Copa Merconorte	FS	(Mexico) Necaxa	0–0	1–2	—
2000	Copa Merconorte	FS	(Peru) Alianza Lima	4–1	3–2	—
2000	Copa Merconorte	FS	(Costa Rica) Alajuelense	2–0	0–3	—
2000	Copa Merconorte	SF	(Mexico) Guadalajara	3–3	1–1	4–2 (h)
2000	Copa Merconorte	F	(Colombia) Millonarios	2–1	0–0	—
2001	Copa Merconorte	FS	(Peru) Universitario	3–0	1–2	—
2001	Copa Merconorte	FS	(Bolivia) Blooming	1–0	2–0	—
2001	Copa Merconorte	FS	(Ecuador) Emelec	0–0	0–3	—
2002	Copa Sudamericana	SS	(Colombia) América de Cali	1–0	2–1	—
2002	Copa Sudamericana	QF	(Chile) Santiago Wanderers	2–1	0–1	6–5 (a)
2002	Copa Sudamericana	SF	(Uruguay) Nacional	2–1	1–2	5–3 (a)
2002	Copa Sudamericana	F	(Argentina) San Lorenzo	0–4	0–0	—
2003	Copa Sudamericana	FS	(Colombia) Deportivo Pasto	2–1	0–0	—
2003	Copa Sudamericana	SS	(Ecuador) LDU Quito	1–0	1–1	—
2003	Copa Sudamericana	QF	(Argentina) Boca Juniors	4–1	1–0	—
2003	Copa Sudamericana	SF	(Peru) Cienciano	1–2	0–1	—
2005	Copa Sudamericana	PR	(Colombia) Deportivo Cali	2–0	0–2	7–6 (a)
2005	Copa Sudamericana	FS	(Venezuela) Trujillanos	2–0	5–1	—
2005	Copa Sudamericana	QF	(Mexico) América	1–4	3–3	—
2006	Copa Libertadores	GS	(Argentina) Rosario Central	1–0	2–1	—
2006	Copa Libertadores	GS	(Brazil) Palmeiras	1–2	2–3	—
2006	Copa Libertadores	GS	(Paraguay) Cerro Porteño	2–2	5–1	—
2006	Copa Libertadores	R16	(Ecuador) LDU Quito	0–1	0–4	—
2007	Copa Sudamericana	PR	(Peru) Universitario	1–0	1–0	—
2007	Copa Sudamericana	FS	(Colombia) Millonarios	2–3	0–0	—
2008	Copa Libertadores	GS	(Brazil) São Paulo	1–1	0–1	—
2008	Copa Libertadores	GS	(Paraguay) Sportivo Luqueño	3–0	3–1	—
2008	Copa Libertadores	GS	(Chile) Audax Italiano	1–1	0–1	—
2008	Copa Libertadores	R16	(Brazil) Fluminense	1–2	0–1	—
2012	Copa Libertadores	GS	Universidad de Chile	2–0	1–2	—
2012	Copa Libertadores	GS	(Uruguay) Peñarol	3–0	4–0	—
2012	Copa Libertadores	GS	(Argentina) Godoy Cruz	2–2	4–4	—
2012	Copa Libertadores	R16	(Argentina) Vélez Sarsfield	0–1	1–1	—
2013	Copa Sudamericana	FS	(Peru) Inti Gas	4–0	1–0	—
2013	Copa Sudamericana	SS	(Paraguay) Guaraní	0–0	2–0	—
2013	Copa Sudamericana	R16	(Brazil) Bahia	1–0	0–1	3–4 (a)
2013	Copa Sudamericana	QF	(Brazil) São Paulo	0–0	2–3	—
2014	Copa Libertadores	GS	(Argentina) Newell's Old Boys	1–0	3–1	—
2014	Copa Libertadores	GS	(Brazil) Grêmio	0–2	0–3	—
2014	Copa Libertadores	GS	(Uruguay) Nacional	2–2	1–0	—
2014	Copa Libertadores	R16	(Brazil) Atlético Mineiro	1–0	1–1	—
2014	Copa Libertadores	QF	(Uruguay) Defensor Sporting	0–2	0–1	—
2014	Copa Sudamericana	FS	(Venezuela) Deportivo La Guaira	1–0	1–1	—
2014	Copa Sudamericana	SS	(Paraguay) General Díaz	0–2	3–1	—
2014	Copa Sudamericana	R16	(Brazil) Vitória	2–2	1–0	—
2014	Copa Sudamericana	QF	(Peru) César Vallejo	1–0	1–0	—
2014	Copa Sudamericana	SF	(Brazil) São Paulo	1–0	0–1	4–1 (a)
2014	Copa Sudamericana	F	(Argentina) River Plate	1–1	0–2	—
2015	Copa Libertadores	GS	(Paraguay) Libertad	4–0	2–2	—
2015	Copa Libertadores	GS	(Argentina) Estudiantes (LP)	1–1	1–0	—
2015	Copa Libertadores	GS	(Ecuador) Barcelona	2–3	2–1	—
2015	Copa Libertadores	R16	(Ecuador) Emelec	0–2	1–0	—
2016	Copa Libertadores	GS	(Argentina) Huracán	0–0	2–0	—
2016	Copa Libertadores	GS	(Peru) Sporting Cristal	3–0	1–0	—
2016	Copa Libertadores	GS	(Uruguay) Peñarol	2–0	4–0	—
2016	Copa Libertadores	R16	(Argentina) Huracán	4–2	0–0	—
2016	Copa Libertadores	QF	(Argentina) Rosario Central	3–1	0–1	—
2016	Copa Libertadores	SF	(Brazil) São Paulo	2–1	2–0	—
2016	Copa Libertadores	F	(Ecuador) Independiente del Valle	1–0	1–1	—
2016	Copa Sudamericana	FS	(Peru) Deportivo Municipal	1–0	5–0	—
2016	Copa Sudamericana	SS	(Bolivia) Bolívar	1–0	1–1	—
2016	Copa Sudamericana	R16	(Paraguay) Sol de América	2–0	1–1	—
2016	Copa Sudamericana	QF	(Brazil) Coritiba	3–1	1–1	—
2016	Copa Sudamericana	SF	(Paraguay) Cerro Porteño	0–0	1–1	—
2016	Copa Sudamericana	F	(Brazil) Chapecoense	Cancelled		—
2016	FIFA Club World Cup	SF	(Japan) Kashima Antlers	0–3		—
2016	FIFA Club World Cup	TP	(Mexico) América	2–2		4–3 (a)
2017	Copa Libertadores	GS	(Ecuador) Barcelona	3–1	1–2	—
2017	Copa Libertadores	GS	(Brazil) Botafogo	0–2	0–1	—
2017	Copa Libertadores	GS	(Argentina) Estudiantes (LP)	4–1	0–1	—
2017	Recopa Sudamericana		(Brazil) Chapecoense	4–1	1–2	—
2018	Copa Libertadores	GS	(Chile) Colo-Colo	0–0	1–0	—
2018	Copa Libertadores	GS	(Ecuador) Delfín	4–0	0–1	—
2018	Copa Libertadores	GS	(Bolivia) Bolívar	4–1	0–1	—
2018	Copa Libertadores	R16	(Argentina) Atlético Tucumán	1–0	0–2	—
2019	Copa Libertadores	SS	(Venezuela) Deportivo La Guaira	0–0	1–0	—
2019	Copa Libertadores	TS	(Paraguay) Libertad	1–0	0–1	4–5 (h)
2019	Copa Sudamericana	SS	(Brazil) Fluminense	1–0	1–1	—
2020	Copa Sudamericana	FS	(Argentina) Huracán	3–0	1–1	—
2020	Copa Sudamericana	SS	(Uruguay) River Plate	1–1	1–3	—
2021	Copa Libertadores	SS	(Paraguay) Guaraní	3–0	2–0	—
2021	Copa Libertadores	TS	(Paraguay) Libertad	4–1	0–1	—
2021	Copa Libertadores	GS	(Argentina) Argentinos Juniors	0–2	0–1	—
2021	Copa Libertadores	GS	(Chile) Universidad Católica	2–0	0–2	—
2021	Copa Libertadores	GS	(Uruguay) Nacional	0–0	4–4	—
2022	Copa Libertadores	SS	(Paraguay) Olimpia	1–1	1–3	—
2023	Copa Libertadores	GS	(Paraguay) Olimpia	2–2	0–3	—
2023	Copa Libertadores	GS	(Argentina) Patronato	0–1	2–1	—
2023	Copa Libertadores	GS	(Peru) Melgar	3–1	1–0	—
2023	Copa Libertadores	R16	(Argentina) Racing	4–2	0–3	—
2024	Copa Libertadores	SS	(Paraguay) Nacional	0–3	1–0	—
2025	Copa Libertadores	GS	(Uruguay) Nacional	3–0	1–0	—
2025	Copa Libertadores	GS	(Brazil) Internacional	3–1	3–0	—
2025	Copa Libertadores	GS	(Brazil) Bahia	1–0	1–0	—
2025	Copa Libertadores	R16	(Brazil) São Paulo	0–0	1–1	4–3 (a)

Notes

- F: Finals
- FS: First stage
- GS: Group stage
- PO: Playoff
- PR: Preliminary round
- QF: Quarter-finals
- R16: Round of 16
- SF: Semi-finals
- SS: Second stage
- TP: Third-place playoff
- TS: Third stage
