= Colombian football clubs in international competitions =

Colombian football clubs have entered South American association football competitions, as of Copa Libertadores and Copa Sudamericana since 1960, when Millonarios participated in the first edition of Copa Libertadores. In 2016, Atlético Nacional became the first Colombian club to take part in the FIFA Club World Cup.

Copa Libertadores is considered the most important club tournament in South America. Two Colombian clubs have won this tournament: Atlético Nacional have won twice (in 1989 and 2016), Once Caldas have won it once (in 2004). Copa Sudamericana has been won by a Colombian club once: Santa Fe in 2015.

== FIFA Club World Cup ==
Year	Team	Progress
2016	Atlético Nacional	Third place

== Copa Libertadores ==
Year	Team	Progress
1960	Millonarios	Semifinals
1961	Santa Fe	Semifinals
1962	Millonarios	Group stage
1963	Millonarios	Group stage
1964	Millonarios	Group stage
1965	No entrants	
1966	No entrants	
1967	Santa Fe	Group stage
1967	Independiente Medellín	Group stage
1968	Deportivo Cali	Group stage
1968	Millonarios	Group stage
1969	Deportivo Cali	Quarterfinals
1969	Unión Magdalena	Group stage
1970	Deportivo Cali	Group stage
1970	América de Cali	Group stage
1971	Deportivo Cali	Group stage
1971	Junior	Group stage
1972	Santa Fe	Group stage
1972	Atlético Nacional	Group stage
1973	Millonarios	Semifinals
1973	Deportivo Cali	First stage
1974	Millonarios	Semifinals
1974	Atlético Nacional	First stage
1975	Deportivo Cali	Group stage
1975	Atlético Nacional	Group stage
1976	Millonarios	Group stage
1976	Santa Fe	Group stage
1977	Deportivo Cali	Semifinals
1977	Atlético Nacional	Group stage
1978	Deportivo Cali	Runners-up
1978	Junior	Group stage
1979	Millonarios	Group stage
1979	Deportivo Cali	Group stage
1980	América de Cali	Semifinals
1980	Santa Fe	Group stage
1981	Deportivo Cali	Semifinals
1981	Junior	Group stage
1982	Deportes Tolima	Semifinals
1982	Atlético Nacional	Group stage
1983	América de Cali	Semifinals
1983	Deportes Tolima	Group stage
1984	América de Cali	Group stage
1984	Junior	Group stage
1985	América de Cali	Runners-up
1985	Millonarios	Group stage
1986	América de Cali	Runners-up
1986	Deportivo Cali	Group stage
1987	América de Cali	Runners-up
1987	Deportivo Cali	Group stage
1988	América de Cali	Semifinals
1988	Millonarios	Group stage
1989	Atlético Nacional	Winners
1989	Millonarios	Quarterfinals
1990	Atlético Nacional	Semifinals
1991	Atlético Nacional	Semifinals
1991	América de Cali	Quarterfinals
1992	América de Cali	Semifinals
1992	Atlético Nacional	Quarterfinals
1993	América de Cali	Semifinals
1993	Atlético Nacional	Round of 16
1994	Junior	Semifinals
1994	Independiente Medellín	Quarterfinals
1995	Atlético Nacional	Runners-up
1995	Millonarios	Quarterfinals
1996	América de Cali	Runners-up
1996	Junior	Quarterfinals
1997	Millonarios	Round of 16
1997	Deportivo Cali	Group stage
1998	América de Cali	Round of 16
1998	Atlético Bucaramanga	Round of 16
1999	Deportivo Cali	Runners-up
1999	Once Caldas	Group stage
2000	América de Cali	Round of 16
2000	Junior	Round of 16
2000	Atlético Nacional	Group stage
2001	América de Cali	Quarterfinals
2001	Junior	Round of 16
2001	Deportivo Cali	Group stage
2002	América de Cali	Round of 16
2002	Cortuluá	Group stage
2002	Once Caldas	Group stage
2003	América de Cali	Semifinals
2003	Independiente Medellín	Semifinals
2003	Deportivo Cali	Round of 16

Year	Team	Progress
2004	Once Caldas	Winners
2004	Deportivo Cali	Quarterfinals
2004	Deportes Tolima	Group stage
2005	Once Caldas	Round of 16
2005	Independiente Medellín	Round of 16
2005	Junior	Round of 16
2005	América de Cali	Group stage
2006	Atlético Nacional	Round of 16
2006	Santa Fe	Round of 16
2006	Deportivo Cali	Group stage
2007	Cúcuta Deportivo	Semifinal
2007	Deportivo Pasto	Group stage
2007	Deportes Tolima	Group stage
2008	Atlético Nacional	Round of 16
2008	Cúcuta Deportivo	Round of 16
2008	Boyacá Chicó	Preliminary round
2009	América de Cali	Group stage
2009	Boyacá Chicó	Group stage
2009	Independiente Medellín	Group stage
2010	Once Caldas	Round of 16
2010	Independiente Medellín	Group stage
2010	Junior	Preliminary round
2011	Junior	Round of 16
2011	Once Caldas	Quarterfinals
2011	Deportes Tolima	Group stage
2012	Atlético Nacional	Round of 16
2012	Junior	Group stage
2012	Once Caldas	Preliminary Round
2013	Santa Fe	Semifinals
2013	Deportes Tolima	Group stage
2013	Millonarios	Group stage
2014	Atlético Nacional	Quarterfinals
2014	Deportivo Cali	Group stage
2014	Santa Fe	Group stage
2015	Santa Fe	Quarterfinals
2015	Atlético Nacional	Round of 16
2015	Once Caldas	Preliminary round
2016	Atlético Nacional	Winners
2016	Deportivo Cali	Group stage
2016	Santa Fe	Group stage
2017	Atlético Nacional	Group stage
2017	Independiente Medellín	Group stage
2017	Santa Fe	Group stage
2017	Junior	Third stage
2017	Millonarios	Second stage
2018	Atlético Nacional	Round of 16
2018	Millonarios	Group stage
2018	Santa Fe	Group stage
2018	Junior	Group stage
2019	Deportes Tolima	Group stage
2019	Junior	Group stage
2019	Atlético Nacional	Third stage
2019	Independiente Medellín	Second stage
2020	Junior	Group stage
2020	América de Cali	Group stage
2020	Independiente Medellín	Group stage
2020	Deportes Tolima	Third stage
2021	América de Cali	Group stage
2021	Santa Fe	Group stage
2021	Junior	Group stage
2021	Atlético Nacional	Group stage
2022	Deportes Tolima	Round of 16
2022	Deportivo Cali	Group stage
2022	Millonarios	Second stage
2022	Atlético Nacional	Second stage
2023	Deportivo Pereira	Quarterfinals
2023	Atlético Nacional	Round of 16
2023	Independiente Medellín	Group stage
2023	Millonarios	Third stage
2024	Junior	Round of 16
2024	Millonarios	Group stage
2024	Águilas Doradas	Second stage
2024	Atlético Nacional	Second stage
2025	Atlético Nacional	Round of 16
2025	Atlético Bucaramanga	Group stage
2025	Deportes Tolima	Second stage
2025	Santa Fe	Second stage
2026	Deportes Tolima	Round of 16
2026	Santa Fe	Group stage
2026	Junior	Group stage
2026	Independiente Medellín	Group stage

== Copa Sudamericana ==
Year	Team	Progress
2002	Atlético Nacional	Runners-up
2002	América de Cali	Round of 16
2003	Atlético Nacional	Semifinals
2003	Deportivo Pasto	First stage
2004	Junior	Quarterfinals
2004	Millonarios	First stage
2005	Atlético Nacional	Round of 16
2005	Deportivo Cali	First stage
2006	Deportes Tolima	Round of 16
2006	Independiente Medellín	First stage
2007	Millonarios	Semifinals
2007	Atlético Nacional	First stage
2008	América de Cali	Round of 16
2008	Deportivo Cali	First stage
2009	Deportivo Cali	First stage
2009	La Equidad	First stage
2010	Deportes Tolima	Quarterfinals
2010	Santa Fe	Round of 16
2010	Atlético Huila	First stage
2011	Santa Fe	Quarterfinals
2011	La Equidad	First stage
2011	Deportivo Cali	First stage
2012	Millonarios	Semifinals
2012	Deportes Tolima	First stage
2012	Envigado	First stage
2012	La Equidad	First stage
2013	Atlético Nacional	Quarterfinals
2013	Itagüí	Quarterfinals
2013	Deportivo Pasto	Round of 16
2013	La Equidad	Round of 16
2014	Atlético Nacional	Runners-up
2014	Deportivo Cali	Second stage
2014	Millonarios	First stage
2014	Águilas Pereira	First stage
2015	Santa Fe	Winners
2015	Deportes Tolima	Round of 16
2015	Águilas Doradas	First stage
2015	Junior	First stage
2016	Atlético Nacional	Runners-up
2016	Junior	Quarterfinals
2016	Independiente Medellín	Quarterfinals
2016	Santa Fe	Round of 16
2016	Deportes Tolima	First stage
2017	Junior	Semifinals
2017	Santa Fe	Round of 16
2017	Deportivo Cali	Second stage
2017	Independiente Medellín	Second stage
2017	Patriotas	Second stage
2017	Deportes Tolima	First stage
2017	Rionegro Águilas	First stage

Year	Team	Progress
2018	Junior	Runners-up
2018	Santa Fe	Semifinals
2018	Deportivo Cali	Quarterfinals
2018	Millonarios	Round of 16
2018	Independiente Medellín	First stage
2018	América de Cali	First stage
2018	Jaguares	First stage
2019	La Equidad	Quarterfinals
2019	Rionegro Águilas	Second stage
2019	Deportivo Cali	Second stage
2019	Atlético Nacional	Second stage
2019	Deportes Tolima	Second stage
2019	Once Caldas	First stage
2020	Junior	Quarter-finals
2020	Deportivo Cali	Round of 16
2020	Atlético Nacional	Second stage
2020	Millonarios	Second stage
2020	Deportes Tolima	Second stage
2020	Deportivo Pasto	First stage
2021	América de Cali	Round of 16
2021	Junior	Round of 16
2021	Deportes Tolima	Group stage
2021	La Equidad	Group stage
2021	Deportivo Pasto	First stage
2021	Deportivo Cali	First stage
2022	Deportivo Cali	Round of 16
2022	Junior	Group stage
2022	Independiente Medellín	Group stage
2022	América de Cali	First stage
2022	La Equidad	First stage
2023	Independiente Medellín	Knockout round play-offs
2023	Deportes Tolima	Group stage
2023	Millonarios	Group stage
2023	Santa Fe	Group stage
2023	Águilas Doradas	First stage
2023	Junior	First stage
2024	Independiente Medellín	Quarterfinals
2024	Alianza	Group stage
2024	Deportes Tolima	First stage
2024	América de Cali	First stage
2025	Once Caldas	Quarterfinals
2025	América de Cali	Round of 16
2025	Atlético Bucaramanga	Knockout round play-offs
2025	Millonarios	First stage
2025	Junior	First stage
2026	Santa Fe	Quarterfinals
2026	Independiente Medellín	Knockout round play-offs
2026	América de Cali	Group stage
2026	Millonarios	Group stage
2026	Atlético Nacional	First stage
2026	Atlético Bucaramanga	First stage

== Recopa Sudamericana ==
Year	Team	Progress
1990	Atlético Nacional	Runners-up
2005	Once Caldas	Runners-up
2016	Santa Fe	Runners-up
2017	Atlético Nacional	Winners

== Intercontinental Cup ==
Year	Team	Progress
1989	Atlético Nacional	Runners-up
2004	Once Caldas	Runners-up

== Suruga Bank Championship ==
Year	Team	Progress
2016	Santa Fe	Winners

== Copa Merconorte ==
Year	Team	Progress
1998	Atlético Nacional	Winners
1998	Deportivo Cali	Runners-up
1998	Millonarios	Semifinals
1998	América de Cali	Group stage
1999	América de Cali	Winners
1999	Santa Fe	Runners-up
1999	Millonarios	Group stage
1999	Atlético Nacional	Group stage
2000	Atlético Nacional	Winners
2000	Millonarios	Runners-up
2000	América de Cali	Group stage
2001	Millonarios	Winners
2001	América de Cali	Group stage
2001	Atlético Nacional	Group stage

== Supercopa Sudamericana ==
Year	Team	Progress
1989	Atlético Nacional	Quarterfinals
1992	Atlético Nacional	Round of 16
1993	Atlético Nacional	Semifinals
1994	Atlético Nacional	Round of 16
1995	Atlético Nacional	Quarterfinals
1996	Atlético Nacional	Quarterfinals
1997	Atlético Nacional	Semifinals

== Copa CONMEBOL ==
Year	Team	Progress
1992	Junior	Quarterfinals
1995	América de Cali	Semifinals
1995	Independiente Medellín	Round of 16
1996	Santa Fe	Runners-up
1996	Deportes Tolima	Round of 16
1997	América de Cali	Quarterfinals
1997	Deportes Tolima	Quarterfinals
1998	Deportes Quindío	Quarterfinals
1998	Once Caldas	Round of 16
1999	Atlético Huila	Round of 16
1999	Deportes Quindío	Round of 16

== Copa Interamericana ==
Year	Team	Progress
1989	Atlético Nacional	Winners
1995	Atlético Nacional	Winners

== Copa Simón Bolívar ==
Year	Team	Progress
1970	Santa Fe	Winners
1970	Junior	Third place
1971	Atlético Nacional	Runners-up
1971	Deportivo Cali	Semifinals
1972	Millonarios	Winners
1975	Atlético Nacional	Fourth place
1976–I	América de Cali	Winners
1976–II	América de Cali	Fourth place
