= 1974 Copa Simón Bolívar (Venezuela) =

1974 Copa Simón Bolívar

Tournament details
- Dates: January 15 – January 19
- Teams: 4 (from 4 associations)

Final positions
- Champions: (Peru) Defensor Lima (1st title)
- Runners-up: (Venezuela) Portuguesa

The 1974 Copa Simón Bolívar (English: Simon Bolivar Cup) was an international football competition organized by the Venezuelan Football Federation. The idea of this competition was to create a tournament among the champions clubs of the countries liberated by Simon Bolivar. It was played six times from its first edition in 1970 to the last in 1976, thus integrating the league champions clubs of Venezuela, Colombia, Peru, Ecuador and Bolivia. Due to its format, it was a historical precedent of the Copa Merconorte, played between the same Bolivarian countries or the Andean Community from 1998 until the 2001 edition.

Defensor Lima won the competition defeating Portuguesa 1–0 in the Third Round.

== Teams ==
Association	Team (Berth)	Qualification method
Colombia (1 berth)	Atlético Nacional	1973 Campeonato Profesional champions
Ecuador (1 berth)	El Nacional	1973 Serie A champions
Peru (1 berth)	Defensor Lima	1973 Torneo Descentralizado champions
Venezuela (1 berth)	Portuguesa	1973 Primera División champions

== Standings ==
Pos	Team	Pld	W	D	L	GF	GA	GD	Pts	Qualification or relegation
1	(Peru) Defensor Lima	3	2	1	0	3	0	+3	5	Champion
2	(Venezuela) Portuguesa	3	1	1	1	3	3	0	3	
3	(Ecuador) El Nacional	3	1	1	1	1	2	−1	3	
4	(Colombia) Atlético Nacional	3	0	1	2	2	4	−2	1	

=== First round ===
15 January 1975

(Colombia) Atlético Nacional	0–0	(Peru) Defensor Lima
Penalties
	5–6

Estadio Atanasio Girardot, Medellín
15 January 1975

(Ecuador) El Nacional	0–0	(Venezuela) Portuguesa
Penalties
	2–0

Estadio Atanasio Girardot, Medellín

=== Second round ===
17 January 1975

(Peru) Defensor Lima	2–0	(Ecuador) El Nacional

Estadio Atanasio Girardot, Medellín
17 January 1975

(Venezuela) Portuguesa	3–2	(Colombia) Atlético Nacional

Estadio Atanasio Girardot, Medellín

=== Third round ===
19 January 1975

(Peru) Defensor Lima	1–0	(Venezuela) Portuguesa

Estadio Atanasio Girardot, Medellín
19 January 1975

(Colombia) Atlético Nacional	0–1	(Ecuador) El Nacional

Estadio Atanasio Girardot, Medellín

== See also ==
- International club competition records
- Copa Merconorte
- Copa Mercosur
- Torneio Mercosul
- CONMEBOL Cup
