= 1970 Copa Simón Bolívar (Venezuela) =

1970 Copa Simón Bolívar

Tournament details
- Dates: 22 October 1970 – 8 December 1970
- Teams: 4 (from 2 associations)

Final positions
- Champions: (Colombia) Santa Fe (1st title)
- Runners-up: (Venezuela) Deportivo Galicia

The 1970 Copa Simón Bolívar (English: Simon Bolivar Cup) was an international football competition organized by the Venezuelan Football Federation. The idea of this competition was to create a tournament among the champions clubs of the countries liberated by Simon Bolivar. It was played six times from its first edition in 1970 to the last in 1976, thus integrating the league champions clubs of Venezuela, Colombia, Peru, Ecuador and Bolivia. Due to its format, it was a historical precedent of the Copa Merconorte, played between the same Bolivarian countries or the Andean Community from 1998 until the 2001 edition.

Santa Fe won the competition.

== Teams ==
Association	Team (Berth)	Qualification method
Colombia (2 berth)	Santa Fe	1970 Campeonato Profesional Apertura champions
Colombia (2 berth)	Junior	1970 Campeonato Profesional Apertura runner-up
Venezuela (2 berth)	Deportivo Galicia	1970 Primera División 3rd place
Venezuela (2 berth)	Unión Deportiva Canarias	1970 Primera División 4th place

== Standings ==
Pos	Team	Pld	W	D	L	GF	GA	GD	Pts	Qualification or relegation
1	(Colombia) Santa Fe	6	3	1	2	9	7	+2	7	Champion
2	(Venezuela) Deportivo Galicia	6	1	4	1	7	6	+1	6	
3	(Colombia) Junior	6	2	2	2	4	4	0	6	
4	(Venezuela) Unión Deportiva Canarias	6	2	1	3	8	11	−3	5	

=== First round ===
22 October 1970

(Colombia) Santa Fe	1–0	(Colombia) Junior

Estadio El Campín, Bogotá
31 October 1970

(Venezuela) Deportivo Galicia	1–1	(Venezuela) Unión Deportiva Canarias

Estadio Olímpico de la Universidad Central, Caracas

=== Second round ===
4 November 1970

(Colombia) Junior	0–0	(Venezuela) Deportivo Galicia

Estadio Municipal, Barranquilla
4 November 1970

(Colombia) Santa Fe	4–1	(Venezuela) Unión Deportiva Canarias

Estadio El Campín, Bogotá

=== Third round ===
6 November 1970

(Colombia) Santa Fe	3–2	(Venezuela) Deportivo Galicia

Estadio El Campín, Bogotá
6 November 1970

(Colombia) Junior	2–1	(Venezuela) Unión Deportiva Canarias

Estadio Municipal, Barranquilla

=== Fourth round ===
17 November 1970

(Venezuela) Deportivo Galicia	0–0	(Colombia) Junior

Estadio Olímpico de la Universidad Central, Caracas
19 November 1970

(Venezuela) Unión Deportiva Canarias	2–1	(Colombia) Junior

Estadio Olímpico de la Universidad Central, Caracas

=== Fifth round ===
24 November 1970

(Venezuela) Deportivo Galicia	1–1	(Colombia) Santa Fe

Estadio Olímpico de la Universidad Central, Caracas
26 November 1970

(Venezuela) Unión Deportiva Canarias	2–0	(Colombia) Santa Fe

Estadio Olímpico de la Universidad Central, Caracas

=== Sixth round ===
3 December 1970

(Venezuela) Unión Deportiva Canarias	1–3	(Venezuela) Deportivo Galicia

Estadio Olímpico de la Universidad Central, Caracas
8 December 1970

(Colombia) Junior	1–0	(Colombia) Santa Fe

Estadio Municipal, Barranquilla

== See also ==
- Copa Merconorte
- Copa Mercosur
- Torneio Mercosul
- CONMEBOL Cup
