= Dan Georgiadis =

Greek footballer and manager (1922-1998)

Personal information
- Full name: Giannis Georgiadis
- Date of birth: 5 May 1922
- Place of birth: Ithaca, Greece
- Date of death: 18 January 1998 (aged 75)
- Place of death: Athens, Greece
- Position: Goalkeeper

Senior career*
Years	Team	Apps	(Gls)
1939–1947	Juventus București		
1947–1948	Panathinaikos	3	(0)

Managerial career
- 1957–1958: Sport Boys
- 1958: Banfield
- 1959: Atlético Chalaco
- 1959–1961: Haiti
- 1961: Peru XI
- 1962: Ferro Carril Oeste
- 1962: Club Bolívar
- 1962–1963: Club Libertad
- 1963–1964: Santiago Wanderers
- 1964: Defensor Lima
- 1965–1968: Club Bolívar
- 1966–1967: Bolivia
- 1968–1969: Greece
- 1969–1970: Panachaiki
- 1970–1971: Olympiacos
- 1971: La Chaux de Fonds
- 1971–1972: Sevilla
- 1972: Alianza Lima
- 1974–1975: AEL
- 1975–1976: Panionios
- 1975–1977: Venezuela
- 1976: Alianza Lima
- 1977: Portuguesa
- 1978–1979: Panionios
- 1982–1983: Trikala
- 1987: Montreux-Sports
- * Club domestic league appearances and goals

Giannis "Dan" Georgiadis (Greek: Γιάννης "Νταν" Γεωργιάδης) (5 May 1922 – 18 January 1998) was a Greek football player and manager.

== Career ==
He was born in Ithaca, but grew up in Athens.

He played for Panathinaikos.

In Romania, he was involved in sports and initially distinguished himself in track and field. The gold medal in the pentathlon of the international games of Romania, Yugoslavia, Albania, Bulgaria, Hungary in 1947 in Bucharest is characteristic. At the same time, he was the main goalkeeper in Juventus Bucharest (former champion of Romania in 1930). He also had 22 appearances (first at 16) with the country's national rugby team and 12 (first at 18) with the corresponding handball team. In 1947, he returned to Greece on behalf of Panathinaikos, but played only in 3 games due to a dislocation in his hand, which forced him to stop playing football in 1948 at the age of 26.

He managed Sport Boys, Ferro Carril Oeste, Greece, Panachaiki, Olympiacos, La Chaux-de-Fonds, Sevilla, Alianza Lima, Panionios, Egaleo, Trikala, and Montreux-Sports.

== Honours ==
=== Manager ===
Peru XI

- Bolivarian Games: 1961

Olympiacos

- Greek Cup: 1970–71

Alianza Lima

- Copa Simón Bolívar: 1976
