= Ospina (disambiguation) =

Ospina is a town and municipality in Nariño Department, Colombia.

Ospina may also refer to:

== People ==
- Camilo Ospina Bernal (born 1959), Colombian lawyer and politician
- Carlos Wyld Ospina (1891–1956), Guatemalan novelist, essayist, and poet
- Daniel Samper Ospina (born 1974), Colombian writer, journalist, and columnist
- David Ospina (born 1988), Colombian footballer
- Germán Ospina (born 1972), Colombian cyclist
- Hernando Calvo Ospina (born 1961), Colombian journalist and writer
- Iván Marino Ospina (fl. 1966–1985), Colombian revolutionary
- John Paul Ospina (born 1980), Colombian entertainer
- Jorge Iván Ospina (born 1965), Colombian politician
- Luciano Ospina (born 1991), Colombian footballer
- Mariano Ospina Pérez (1891–1976), Colombian politician
- Mariano Ospina Rodríguez (1805–1885), Colombian politician, journalist, and lawyer
- Nadín Ospina (born 1960), Colombian artist
- Pedro Nel Ospina Vázquez (1858–1927), Colombian general and political figure
- Santander Ospina (born 1974), Colombian footballer
- William Ospina (born 1954), Colombian poet, essayist, and novelist

== Other uses ==
- Ospina Coffee Company, Colombian firm
