= 1976 Copa Simón Bolívar (Venezuela) =

1976 Copa Simón Bolívar

Tournament details
- Dates: November 28 – December 5
- Teams: 4 (from 4 associations)

Final positions
- Champions: (Peru) Alianza Lima (1st title)
- Runners-up: (Bolivia) Guabirá

The 1976 Copa Simón Bolívar (English: Simon Bolivar Cup) was an international football competition organized by the Venezuelan Football Federation. The idea of this competition was to create a tournament among the champions clubs of the countries liberated by Simon Bolivar. It was played six times from its first edition in 1970 to the last in 1976, thus integrating the league champions clubs of Venezuela, Colombia, Peru, Ecuador and Bolivia. Due to its format, it was a historical precedent of the Copa Merconorte, played between the same Bolivarian countries or the Andean Community from 1998 until the 2001 edition.

Alianza Lima won the competition defeating Portuguesa 2–0 in the Third Round.

== Teams ==
Association	Team (Berth)	Qualification method
Bolivia (1 berth)	Guabirá	1975 Primera División champions
Colombia (1 berth)	América de Cali	1975 Copa Simón Bolívar champions
Peru (1 berth)	Alianza Lima	1975 Torneo Descentralizado champions
Venezuela (1 berth)	Portuguesa	1975 Primera División champions

== Standings ==
Pos	Team	Pld	W	D	L	GF	GA	GD	Pts	Qualification or relegation
1	(Peru) Alianza Lima	3	2	0	1	4	2	+2	4	Champion
2	(Bolivia) Guabirá	3	2	0	1	4	3	+1	4	
3	(Venezuela) Portuguesa	3	2	0	1	2	2	0	4	
4	(Colombia) América de Cali	3	0	0	3	3	6	−3	0	

=== First round ===
28 November 1976

(Venezuela) Portuguesa	1–0	(Bolivia) Guabirá

Estadio General José Antonio Paez, Acarigua
30 November 1976

(Peru) Alianza Lima	2–1	(Colombia) América de Cali

Estadio General José Antonio Paez, Acarigua

=== Second round ===
2 December 1976

(Bolivia) Guabirá	1–0	(Peru) Alianza Lima

Estadio General José Antonio Paez, Acarigua
2 December 1976

(Venezuela) Portuguesa	1–0	(Colombia) América de Cali

Estadio General José Antonio Paez, Acarigua

=== Third round ===
5 December 1976

(Bolivia) Guabirá	3–2	(Colombia) América de Cali

Estadio General José Antonio Paez, Acarigua
5 December 1976

(Peru) Alianza Lima	2–0	(Venezuela) Portuguesa

Estadio General José Antonio Paez, Acarigua

== See also ==
- International club competition records
- Copa Merconorte
- Copa Mercosur
- Torneio Mercosul
- CONMEBOL Cup
