= 1971 Copa Simón Bolívar (Venezuela) =

1971 Copa Simón Bolívar

Tournament details
- Dates: 28 September 1971 – 8 June 1973
- Teams: 4 (from 2 associations)

Final positions
- Champions: (Venezuela) Deportivo Galicia (1st title)
- Runners-up: (Colombia) Atlético Nacional

The 1971 Copa Simón Bolívar (English: Simon Bolivar Cup) was an international football competition organized by the Venezuelan Football Federation. The idea of this competition was to create a tournament among the champions clubs of the countries liberated by Simon Bolivar. It was played six times from its first edition in 1970 to the last in 1976, thus integrating the league champions clubs of Venezuela, Colombia, Peru, Ecuador and Bolivia. Due to its format, it was a historical precedent of the Copa Merconorte, played between the same Bolivarian countries or the Andean Community from 1998 until the 2001 edition.

This tournament began in 1971 but finished in 1973 due to internal problems at the Federación Venezolana de Fútbol (FVF). For example, the first final game was played on November 4, 1971, between Deportivo Galicia and Atlético Nacional de Medellín, but some days later the FVF didn't allow the Venezolan team to travel for the second game, so it was suspended until 1972, when the FVF authorized to Deportivo Galicia to travel to Medellín. FVF were suspended by FIFA on March 9, 1973. Finally, Venezolan doctor René Hemmer traveled to Colombia to join with Colombian members of Federación Colombia de Fútbol (FCF) about finishing the tournament. Nacional de Medellín and FCF agreed to play after FVF paid $5.500 due to damage because of not playing the game at the time. The extra game was played on June 9, 1973. Deportivo Galicia won the competition defeating Atlético Nacional 3–2 in the penalty kicks.

== Teams ==
Association	Team (Berth)	Qualification method
Colombia (2 berth)	Deportivo Cali	1971 Campeonato Profesional Apertura champions
Colombia (2 berth)	Atlético Nacional	1971 Campeonato Profesional Apertura runner-up
Venezuela (2 berth)	Deportivo Galicia	1971 Primera División 4th place
Venezuela (2 berth)	Unión Deportiva Canarias	1971 Primera División 5th place

== Semifinals ==
=== Venezuela ===
==== First leg ====
28 September 1971

(Venezuela) Deportivo Galicia	2–1	(Venezuela) Unión Deportiva Canarias

Estadio Olímpico de la Universidad Central, Caracas

==== Second leg ====
4 October 1971

(Venezuela) Unión Deportiva Canarias	0–1	(Venezuela) Deportivo Galicia

Estadio Olímpico de la Universidad Central, Caracas

=== First leg ===
28 September 1971

(Colombia) Atlético Nacional	2–1	(Colombia) Deportivo Cali

Estadio El Campín, Bogotá

=== Second leg ===
15 October 1971

(Colombia) Deportivo Cali	1–1	(Colombia) Atlético Nacional

== Finals ==
=== First leg ===
4 November 1971

(Venezuela) Deportivo Galicia	0–1	(Colombia) Atlético Nacional

Estadio Olímpico de la Universidad Central, Caracas

=== Second leg ===
17 May 1972

(Colombia) Atlético Nacional	0–1	(Venezuela) Deportivo Galicia

Estadio El Campín, Bogotá

=== Final playoff ===
8 June 1973

(Venezuela) Deportivo Galicia	2–2	(Colombia) Atlético Nacional
Penalties
	3–2

Estadio Olímpico de la Universidad Central, Caracas

== See also ==
- International club competition records
- Copa Merconorte
- Copa Mercosur
- Torneio Mercosul
- CONMEBOL Cup
