= Leonardo Moreno =

Leonardo Moreno may refer to:

- Leonardo Fabio Moreno (born 1973), Colombian footballer
- Leonardo Maekawa Moreno (born 1992), Mexican ice dancer
