= 1972 Copa Simón Bolívar (Venezuela) =

1972 Copa Simón Bolívar

Tournament details
- Dates: 12 September 1973 – 22 November 1973
- Teams: 2 (from 2 associations)

Final positions
- Champions: (Colombia) Millonarios (1st title)
- Runners-up: (Venezuela) Deportivo Portugués

The 1972 Copa Simón Bolívar (English: Simon Bolivar Cup) was an international football competition organized by the Venezuelan Football Federation. The idea of this competition was to create a tournament among the champions clubs of the countries liberated by Simon Bolivar. It was played six times from its first edition in 1970 to the last in 1976, thus integrating the league champions clubs of Venezuela, Colombia, Peru, Ecuador and Bolivia. Due to its format, it was a historical precedent of the Copa Merconorte, played between the same Bolivarian countries or the Andean Community from 1998 until the 2001 edition.

This tournament (1972 edition) was played in 1973 due to internal problems at the Federación Venezuela de Fútbol, which had been suspended by FIFA because of problems between FVF and the Instituto Nacional de Deportes. No preliminary eliminations were held in the relevant countries. Ironically, the 1973 edition was not played. Millonarios won the competition defeating Deportivo Portugués 3–0 in the Second leg.

== Teams ==
Association	Team (Berth)	Qualification method
Colombia (1 berth)	Millonarios	1972 Campeonato Profesional champions
Venezuela (1 berth)	Deportivo Portugués	1972 Copa Venezuela champions

=== First leg ===
12 September 1973

(Venezuela) Deportivo Portugués	2–0	(Colombia) Millonarios

Estadio Olímpico de la Universidad Central, Caracas

=== Second leg ===
22 November 1973

(Colombia) Millonarios	3–0	(Venezuela) Deportivo Portugués

Estadio El Campín, Bogotá

== See also ==
- International club competition records
- Copa Merconorte
- Copa Mercosur
- Torneio Mercosul
- CONMEBOL Cup
