= 1998 Copa Merconorte =

Copa Merconorte 1998
Tournament details
- Dates: 15 September – 9 December 1998
- Teams: 12 (from 5 associations)

Final positions
- Champions: (Colombia) Atlético Nacional (1st title)
- Runners-up: (Colombia) Deportivo Cali

Tournament statistics
- Matches played: 75
- Goals scored: 218 (2.91 per match)
- Top scorer(s): (Colombia) Héctor Hurtado (Colombia) Neider Morantes (Venezuela) Rafael Castellín (Ecuador) Héctor Ferri (Argentina) Carlos Alberto Juárez (4 goals each)

Copa Merconorte logo

The 1998 Copa Merconorte was the 1st edition of association football tournament Copa Merconorte held in 1998. Atlético Nacional of Colombia beat Deportivo Cali also of Colombia in the final.

Originally, this tournament was to start on 1 September 1998 (the group stage lasting until 25 November), with 16 teams divided into 4 groups of 4. Those 16 teams included 3 Mexican teams, América, Cruz Azul and Guadalajara.

However, the Mexican Football Federation insisted on including Toluca and Necaxa, the two finalists of the 1998 Summer season, instead of América and Guadalajara, who had been chosen for their popular support. No agreement could be reached, and on 20 August the Mexican teams withdrew. The organization then decided to remove the two teams from the USA (D.C. United and Los Angeles Galaxy) as well, include a fourth Colombian team (América de Cali) and play with 3 groups of 4.

== Participants ==
Country	Team
Bolivia (1 berth)	The Strongest
Colombia (4 berths)	América de Cali
Colombia (4 berths)	Atlético Nacional
Colombia (4 berths)	Deportivo Cali
Colombia (4 berths)	Millonarios
Ecuador (3 berths)	Barcelona
Ecuador (3 berths)	El Nacional
Ecuador (3 berths)	Emelec
Peru (3 berths)	Alianza Lima
Peru (3 berths)	Sporting Cristal
Peru (3 berths)	Universitario
Venezuela (1 berth)	Caracas

== Group stage ==
According to the original draw in march of 1998, these are the groups of competition:

Group A: Sporting Cristal, Emelec, Deportivo Cali and Guadalajara

Group B: América, Universitario, El Nacional and Atlético Nacional

Group C: Alianza Lima, Barcelona, Millonarios and D.C. United

Group D: The Strongest, Caracas, Cruz Azul and Los Angeles Galaxy

Each team played the other teams in the group twice during the group stage. The three group winners and the best runner-up advanced to the second round.

=== Group A ===
Pos	Team	Pld	W	D	L	GF	GA	GD	Pts	Qualification	(Colombia) MIL	(Ecuador) EME	(Colombia) AME	(Peru) CRI
1	(Colombia) Millonarios	6	3	1	2	7	8	−1	10	Advance to Semifinals	—	2–1	2–2	1–0
2	(Ecuador) Emelec	6	2	3	1	9	6	+3	9		3–0	—	1–0	1–1
3	(Colombia) América de Cali	6	1	4	1	9	9	0	7		2–1	2–2	—	1–1
4	(Peru) Sporting Cristal	6	0	4	2	5	7	−2	4		0–1	1–1	2–2	—

=== Group B ===
Pos	Team	Pld	W	D	L	GF	GA	GD	Pts	Qualification	(Colombia) ATL	(Peru) ALI	(Bolivia) STR	(Ecuador) BAR
1	(Colombia) Atlético Nacional	6	3	2	1	14	7	+7	11	Advance to Semifinals	—	3–1	2–3	4–0
2	(Peru) Alianza Lima	6	2	2	2	8	6	+2	8		1–1	—	4–0	2–0
3	(Bolivia) The Strongest	6	2	2	2	5	9	−4	8		0–2	0–0	—	1–0
4	(Ecuador) Barcelona	6	1	2	3	5	10	−5	5		2–2	2–0	1–1	—

=== Group C ===
Pos	Team	Pld	W	D	L	GF	GA	GD	Pts	Qualification	(Colombia) CAL	(Ecuador) NAC	(Venezuela) CAR	(Peru) UNI
1	(Colombia) Deportivo Cali	6	3	2	1	7	3	+4	11	Advance to Semifinals	—	2–0	1–1	2–1
2	(Ecuador) El Nacional	6	3	1	2	6	6	0	10	Advance to Semifinals	1–0	—	2–1	1–1
3	(Venezuela) Caracas	6	2	1	3	6	8	−2	7		0–2	1–0	—	0–2
4	(Peru) Universitario	6	1	2	3	6	8	−2	5		0–0	1–2	1–3	—

=== Ranking of second placed teams ===
Pos	Grp	Team	Pld	W	D	L	GF	GA	GD	Pts	Qualification
1	C	(Ecuador) El Nacional	6	3	1	2	6	6	0	10	Advance to Semifinals
2	A	(Ecuador) Emelec	6	2	3	1	9	6	+3	9	
3	B	(Peru) Alianza Lima	6	2	2	2	8	6	+2	8	

Source: RSSSF
Rules for classification: 1) points in all group matches; 2) total goal differential; 3) total goals scored; 4) lots drawn by CONMEBOL.

== Semifinals ==
Team 1	Agg.	Team 2	1st leg	2nd leg
El Nacional (Ecuador)	3–3 (4–5 p)	(Colombia) Deportivo Cali	1–2	2–1
Millonarios (Colombia)	2–3	(Colombia) Atlético Nacional	0–2	2–1

=== First leg ===
19 November 1998

El Nacional (Ecuador)	1–2	(Colombia) Deportivo Cali
Chalá 61'		Gaviria 31'; Bonilla 47'

Olímpico Atahualpa, Quito
Referee: (Peru) José Arana Villamonte

19 November 1998

Millonarios (Colombia)	0–2	(Colombia) Atlético Nacional
		Zambrano 62'; Morantes 77'

El Campín, Bogotá
Referee: (Bolivia) René Ortubé

=== Second leg ===
26 November 1998

Deportivo Cali (Colombia)	1–2	(Ecuador) El Nacional
Escobar 69'		Valencia 59'; Ferri 83'
Penalties
Zapata (penalty scored); Bedoya (penalty scored); Córdoba (penalty scored); Dudamel (penalty scored); Patiño (penalty missed); Mosquera (penalty scored)	5–4	(penalty scored) Alvarado; (penalty scored) Ordóñez; (penalty scored) Ferri; (penalty missed) Burbano; (penalty scored) Arroyo; (penalty missed) Carcelén

Olímpico Pascual Guerrero, Cali
Referee: (Venezuela) Paolo Borgosano

26 November 1998

Atlético Nacional (Colombia)	1–2	(Colombia) Millonarios
Grisales 64'		Toro 71'; Ramírez 81'

Atanasio Girardot, Medellín
Referee: (Venezuela) Luis Solórzano

== Finals ==
Team 1	Agg.	Team 2	1st leg	2nd leg
Atlético Nacional (Colombia)	4–1	(Colombia) Deportivo Cali	3–1	1–0

=== First leg ===
3 December 1998

Atlético Nacional (Colombia)	3–1	(Colombia) Deportivo Cali
Vásquez 29', 73'; Perea 61'		Zapata 49'

Atanasio Girardot, Medellín
Referee: (Colombia) Felipe Russi

=== Second leg ===
9 December 1998

Deportivo Cali (Colombia)	0–1	(Colombia) Atlético Nacional
		Moranes 90'

Olímpico Pascual Guerrero, Cali
Referee: (Colombia) Óscar Ruiz

== Statistics ==
=== Top scorers ===
Rank	Player	Team	Total
1	(Ecuador) Héctor Ferri	(Ecuador) El Nacional	4
1	(Colombia) Neider Morantes	(Colombia) Atlético Nacional	4
1	(Venezuela) Rafael Castellín	(Venezuela) Caracas	4
1	(Colombia) Héctor Hurtado	(Colombia) América de Cali	4
1	(Argentina) Carlos Alberto Juárez	(Ecuador) Emelec	4
6	(Colombia) Víctor Bonilla	(Colombia) Deportivo Cali	3
6	(Colombia) Walter Escobar	(Colombia) Deportivo Cali	3
6	(Colombia) Carlos Vásquez	(Colombia) Atlético Nacional	3
6	(Argentina) Mauro Cantoro	(Peru) Universitario	3
6	(Colombia) Jairo Castillo	(Colombia) América de Cali	3
6	(Peru) Germán Carty	(Peru) Sporting Cristal	3
