= Copa Simón Bolívar (Venezuela) =

- The trophy awarded to champions
- Organiser(s): FVF
- Founded: 1970
- Abolished: 1976; 50 years ago
- Region: Venezuela
- Teams: 11
- Related competitions: Copa Merconorte
- Most championships: 6 teams (1 title each): (Colombia) Santa Fe (1); (Venezuela) Deportivo Galicia (1); (Colombia) Millonarios (1); (Peru) Defensor Lima (1); (Colombia) América de Cali (1); (Peru) Alianza Lima (1)

The Copa Simón Bolívar (English: Simon Bolivar Cup) was an international football competition organized by the Venezuelan Football Federation. The idea of this competition was to create a tournament among the champions clubs of the countries liberated by Simon Bolivar. It was played six times from its first edition in 1970 to the last in 1976, thus integrating the league champions clubs of Venezuela, Colombia, Peru, Ecuador and Bolivia. Due to its format, it was a historical precedent of the Copa Merconorte, played between the same Bolivarian countries or the Andean Community from 1998 until the 2001 edition.

It is an official tournament to be organized by a football federation member of the CONMEBOL (in this case the Venezuelan federation), in addition to which it had continuity for several years. Although the South American Football Confederation endorsed it at the time, is not included in the list of competitions organised by the entity as they are not the direct organisers of the tournament, however, the competition was very important for the time and was cited by various sports media as a relevant international title, so much so that the president of the entity at the time, Teófilo Salinas, officially delivered the cup. It was not organized by CONMEBOL or FIFA, similar to the case of the old River Plate tournaments such as the Copa Aldao, which is also considered official. Other examples are in Europe where the Copa Latina, Copa Mitropa, or the Copa de Ferias were played that were not organized by UEFA and were also considered official competitions at the time, although these are endorsed by FIFA.

The titles list is led by six teams belonging to three federations, while the teams of the Colombian federation lead the list by winning federations with three titles, followed by the Peruvian federation with two titles and the Venezuelan federation with a single title.

== History ==
The tournament began in 1970 on the initiative of the Venezuelan Football Federation and initially counting on the support and participation of the Colombian clubs affiliated to the Colombian Football Major Division, the governing body of the Colombian league and which even created previous qualification systems to the tournament in the first three editions only included clubs from Colombia and Venezuela, from 1975 representatives of Peru joined, Bolivia and Ecuador; the tournament was discontinued in 1976 for calendar and economic reasons. It is recognized as a predecessor of the Copa Merconorte that was played by these same countries of northern South America.

The reasons for the disappearance of the event were written by journalist José Visconti, for the newspaper El Nacional:

Es muy difícil que la Copa Simón Bolívar sobreviva. Nadie quiere cargar con los elevados costos que supone. Además, no hay nada que obligue a los equipos participantes a enviar equipos en forma para este certamen y ello incide negativamente en la calidad del evento.

It is very difficult for the Simon Bolivar Cup to survive. Nobody wants to bear the high costs involved. In addition, there is nothing that forces the participating teams to send teams in form for this event and this has a negative impact on the quality of the event.

— José Visconti, for the newspaper El Nacional

== List of champions ==
| Ed. | Year | Champion | Runner-up | Third place | Fourth place |
|---|---|---|---|---|---|
| 1 | 1970 | (Colombia) Santa Fe (1) | (Venezuela) Deportivo Galicia | (Colombia) Junior | (Venezuela) Unión Deportiva Canarias |
| 2 | 1971 | (Venezuela) Deportivo Galicia (1) | (Colombia) Atlético Nacional | (Venezuela) Unión Deportiva Canarias | (Colombia) Deportivo Cali |
| 3 | 1972 | (Colombia) Millonarios (1) | (Venezuela) Deportivo Portugués | — | |
| 4 | 1974 | (Peru) Defensor Lima (1) | (Venezuela) Portuguesa | (Ecuador) El Nacional | (Colombia) Atlético Nacional |
| 5 | 1975 | (Colombia) América de Cali (1) | (Venezuela) Estudiantes de Mérida | (Bolivia) The Strongest | (Ecuador) LDU Quito |
| 6 | 1976 | (Peru) Alianza Lima (1) | (Bolivia) Guabirá | (Venezuela) Portuguesa | (Colombia) América de Cali |

== Performances ==
=== By club ===
| Team | Won | Runner-up | Years won | Years runner-up |
|---|---|---|---|---|
| (Venezuela) Deportivo Galicia | 1 | 1 | 1971 | 1970 |
| (Colombia) Santa Fe | 1 | 0 | 1970 | — |
| (Colombia) Millonarios | 1 | 0 | 1972 | — |
| (Peru) Defensor Lima | 1 | 0 | 1974 | — |
| (Colombia) América de Cali | 1 | 0 | 1975 | — |
| (Peru) Alianza Lima | 1 | 0 | 1976 | — |
| (Colombia) Atlético Nacional | 0 | 1 | — | 1971 |
| (Venezuela) Deportivo Portugués | 0 | 1 | — | 1972 |
| (Venezuela) Portuguesa | 0 | 1 | — | 1974 |
| (Venezuela) Estudiantes de Mérida | 0 | 1 | — | 1975 |
| (Bolivia) Guabirá | 0 | 1 | — | 1976 |

=== By country ===
| Country | Won | Runners-Up | Winning Clubs | Runners-Up |
|---|---|---|---|---|
| Colombia | 3 | 1 | América de Cali (1); Millonarios (1); Santa Fe (1) | Atlético Nacional (1) |
| Peru | 2 | 0 | Alianza Lima (1); Defensor Lima (1) | — |
| Venezuela | 1 | 4 | Deportivo Galicia (1) | Deportivo Galicia (1), Deportivo Portugués (1), Estudiantes de Mérida (1), Portuguesa (1) |
| Bolivia | 0 | 1 | — | Guabirá (1) |
| Ecuador | 0 | 0 | — | — |

== See also ==
- Copa Merconorte
- Copa Mercosur
- Torneio Mercosul
- CONMEBOL Cup
