= Neider Morantes =

Colombian footballer (born 1975)

Personal information
- Full name: Néider Yesid Morantes Londoño
- Date of birth: 3 August 1975 (age 51)
- Place of birth: Medellín, Colombia
- Position: Midfielder

Senior career*
Years	Team	Apps	(Gls)
1994–2000	Atlético Nacional	63	(6)
2000–2001	Atlante FC	25	(2)
2001–2002	Irapuato FC	2	(0)
2002	Once Caldas	4	(0)
2002–2003	Atlético Nacional	30	(3)
2003	Atlético Bucaramanga	13	(2)
2004	Independiente Medellín	43	(11)
2005	Deportivo Ríonegro	?	(?)
2005–2006	Barcelona SC	23	(7)
2006–2007	Independiente Medellín	39	(6)
2008–2014	Envigado FC	215	(66)
2015–2016	América de Cali	42	(3)
2016	Boyacá Chicó	4	(0)

International career
1997–2004	Colombia	21	(4)
- * Club domestic league appearances and goals

Néider Yesid Morantes Londoño (Note: In this Spanish name, the first or paternal surname is Morantes and the second or maternal family name is Londoño.) (born August 3, 1975), known as Neider Morantes, is a Colombian retired footballer.

== Club career ==
Morantes made his professional debut with Atlético Nacional in 1994. In April 1997, he won his first title with Los Verdolagas, lifting the Copa Interamericana after beating Deportivo Saprissa. In 1998, he was part of the team that won the Copa Merconorte, defeating Deportivo Cali 4–1 on aggregate. Morantes scored the only goal of the second leg in the closing minutes of the match. Morantes was also a part of the team that won the 1999 league title.

For the 2000–01 season, he transferred to Atlante of the Liga MX, where he scored 2 goals in 25 appearances. He transferred in summer 2001 to Irapuato for one season. In 2002 he had a brief spell at Once Caldas, before returning to Atletico Nacional for the 2002–03 season.

After that he played the 2003 Clausura with Atlético Bucaramanga. The following year he transferred to Nacional's rivals, Independiente Medellín. During his time at El Poderoso, he was an integral part of the team that won the 2004 Apertura against crosstown rivals Nacional, which was also his first club as a professional footballer.

For the 2005 Apertura, he played with Deportivo Ríonegro. From 2005 to 2006 he played with Ecuadorian club Barcelona.

From 2006 to 2007 he rejoined Independiente Medellín. In 2008 he was signed by Envigado and became a legend there, making over 200 appearances and scoring over 60 goals in a six-year spell which included many high points, like a participation in the 2012 Copa Sudamericana, the club's first ever qualification for an international tournament, and league playoff qualifications in 2009, 2011, and 2014; there were also low points like having to narrowly escape relegation in 2010, where Envigado defeated Deportivo Pasto on aggregate in the relegation playoff.

On 12 February 2015, América de Cali announced that Morantes had been signed for the upcoming Primera B season. America had a good regular season and qualified for the playoffs at the #3 seed, but they were not able to qualify for the finals in their playoff group after finishing behind eventual champion Atlético Bucaramanga. In May 2016, Morantes announced his departure for the club, adding that he was "affected" by not being able to continue with the club; America was promoted to the top division a few months after his departure. In 2016, he joined Boyaca Chico for the 2016 Finalizacion, where an injury forced him to only play four matches with the club, and he announced his retirement later that year at the age of 42.

In 2017, he revealed in an interview that he had planned to finish his career at Independiente Medellin or Envigado, clubs where he is seen as a legend, but a deal could not be finalized.

== International career ==
Morantes made his debut for Colombia in 1997. He participated in the 1997 Copa América, the 1999 Copa América, and the 2004 Copa América, being part of the squad that achieved fourth place.

== Career statistics ==
=== International ===
Appearances and goals by national team and year
National team	Year	Apps	Goals
Colombia	1997	6	2
Colombia	1998	1	0
Colombia	1999	7	3
Colombia	2000	2	0
Colombia	2001	2	0
Colombia	2004	3	0
Total		21	5

Scores and results list Colombia's goal tally first, score column indicates score after each Morantes goal.

List of international goals scored by Neider Morantes
No.	Date	Venue	Opponent	Score	Result	Competition	Ref.
1	16 June 1997	Estadio Ramón Tahuichi Aguilera, Santa Cruz, Bolivia	Costa Rica	1–0	4–1	1997 Copa America	
2	16 June 1997	Estadio Ramón Tahuichi Aguilera, Santa Cruz, Bolivia	Costa Rica	2–0	4–1	1997 Copa America	
3	15 April 1999	Olympic Stadium, Caracas, Venezuela	Venezuela	1–0	1–1	Friendly	
4	22 April 1999	Estadio Feliciano Cáceres, Luque, Paraguay	Paraguay	2–0	2–0	Friendly	
5	7 July 1999	Estadio Feliciano Cáceres, Luque, Paraguay	Ecuador	1–0	2–1	1999 Copa America	

== Titles ==
=== Atlético Nacional ===
- Copa Interamericana: 1997
- Copa Merconorte: 1998
- Categoría Primera A: 1999

=== Independiente Medellin ===
- Categoría Primera A: 2004 Apertura
