= Jairo Castillo =

Colombian footballer (born 1977)

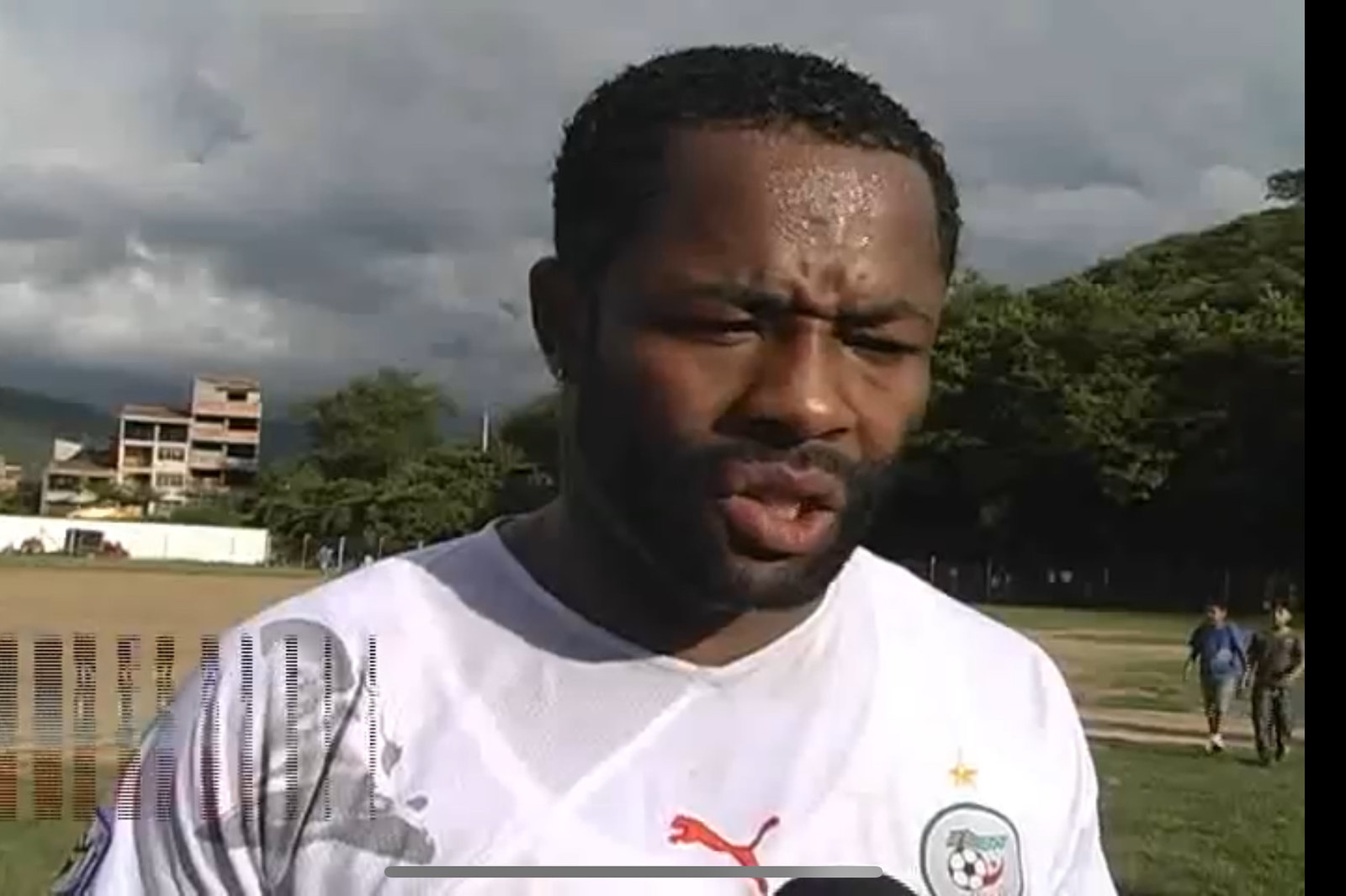
- Castillo in 2008

Personal information
- Date of birth: 17 November 1977 (age 48)
- Place of birth: Tumaco, Colombia
- Height: 1.78 m (5 ft 10 in)
- Position: Striker

Senior career*
Years	Team	Apps	(Gls)
1994–2000	América de Cali	155	(57)
1995	→ Atlético Bucaramanga (loan)	25	(8)
2000–2001	Vélez Sársfield	27	(7)
2002–2003	América de Cali	49	(15)
2004	Independiente	32	(7)
2005	Valladolid	12	(2)
2005	América de Cali	8	(1)
2006	Millonarios	16	(1)
2007	Limassol	5	(4)
2008	Defensor Sporting	11	(6)
2008–2009	Godoy Cruz	8	(5)
2009	Millonarios	5	(0)
2010	Godoy Cruz	30	(9)
2011	Querétaro	5	(0)
2011	Independiente	2	(1)
2011	→ América de Cali (loan)	14	(7)
2012	Atlético Tucumán	8	(1)
2013–2014	Boyacá Chicó	34	(9)

International career
1999–2005	Colombia	23	(5)
2000	Colombia U-23	3	(2)
- * Club domestic league appearances and goals

Jairo Fernando "El Tigre" (The Tiger) Castillo Cortés (born 17 November 1977) is a retired Colombian footballer.

== Club career ==
Castillo's professional career began with América de Cali in 1994. In 1995, Castillo was loaned to second-division club Atletico Bucaramanga, and scored 8 goals in 25 appearances, helping his club win the 1995 Categoría Primera B title. He returned to America for the 1996 season having gained more experience and won his first title as a professional, the 1996-97 league championship, and finished runner-up in the Copa Libertadores. In 1999, he won the Copa Merconorte. In the second leg of the Copa Merconorte finals against Santa Fe, Castillo scored the only goal of the game, and then scored his penalty in the shootout to help America lift the trophy.

In 2000, he joined Vélez Sársfield of Argentina but returned to América de Cali after only one season where he won another Colombian league title in 2002. In 2003, he went back to Argentina to play for Independiente.

In 2005, Castillo had his first spell in Europe in Spain's second division with Real Valladolid. In 2006, he signed for Millonarios. In 2007, he returned to Europe, this time going to Cyprus and signing for Limassol. Despite a short six-month spell in Cyprus, he managed to score 4 goals in 5 matches. In 2008, he joined Uruguayan club Defensor Sporting and scored six goals in 11 matches to help the club win the 2007–08 league title.

Castillo returned to Argentina in the second half of 2008 to play for newly promoted Godoy Cruz. He scored twice on his league debut against Banfield and then on 28 September 2008 he scored a hat-trick, helping Godoy Cruz beat Boca Juniors 4–1.

Ironically, his improved form would only cause more heartbreak; being the Argentine club's best player, he suffered a season-ending torn ACL after a hard tackle in an away match against Gimnasia on 5 October 2008.

In September 2009, after 11 months without playtime, Castillo left Godoy Cruz after his contract with the club expired, and joined Millonarios.

In December 2009 the 32-year-old forward moved back to Godoy Cruz after six months in Colombia. Castillo left the club at the end of 2010 having scored 11 league goals in 34 appearances and becoming a key player for the club that qualified for the 2011 Copa Libertadores.

In January 2011 he joined Querétaro of Liga MX. With Querétaro in a relegation fight, and after a 5–0 loss to Toluca, Castillo and two other players were separated from the squad for indiscipline. A few days later, with transfer rumors about Castillo circulating the media, the club stated, "Castillo is separated from the squad, but we are nowhere close to the cancellation of his contract." The following day, Castillo rejoined Independiente on a one-year contract, but his contract was cut short in June due to poor performance as judged by the club's board.

Castillo was loaned back to America for the 2011 Finalizacion. He made 14 appearances and scored seven goals, including back to back winning goals against Deportes Quindío, and Independiente Santa Fe. Although Castillo's goals led America to the playoffs, it was not enough to prevent their berth for the relegation playoff against Patriotas Boyacá. Castillo scored a goal in the second leg, as the match went to penalties after a 2–2 draw on aggregate. Despite scoring during the match, Castillo missed his penalty, and America later lost the shootout and were relegated for the first time in club history.

In January 2012, Castillo signed with Argentine second-tier club Atletico Tucuman. He had a short spell at the club, leaving in May 2012.

In May 2013, Castillo was announced as Boyacá Chicó's newest signing. He retired at the conclusion of the 2014 Finalizacion having made 34 appearances and scored nine goals with the club.

== International career ==
Castillo played 23 times for the Colombia national team between 1999 and 2005, he was part of the squad that won their first and only Copa América title in 2001.

Castillo also played for the Colombia under-23 team in the 2000 CONMEBOL Pre-Olympic Tournament, where he scored two goals against Ecuador and Venezuela, respectively.

== Legal Issues ==
Castillo has been involved in many controversies throughout his career, mainly regarding car accidents. In August 2001, he was drunk driving and killed two women after crashing into a taxi in Cali. He was convicted to a suspended sentence of 36 months.

In November 2015, the footballer was caught drunk driving for a third time and attempted with failure to evade police in a taxi. In February 2016, a woman sued him for an alleged assault that occurred while leaving a nightclub. In September 2016, Castillo was caught drink driving with a suspended license and was imposed a fine.

== Honours ==
=== America de Cali ===
- Categoria Primera A: 1997, 2002
- Copa Merconorte: 1999

=== Defensor Sporting ===
- Uruguayan Primera Division: 2007–08
