= 1975 Copa Simón Bolívar (Venezuela) =

1975 Copa Simón Bolívar

Tournament details
- Dates: February 27 – March 3
- Teams: 4 (from 4 associations)

Final positions
- Champions: (Colombia) América de Cali (1st title)
- Runners-up: (Venezuela) Estudiantes de Mérida

The 1975 Copa Simón Bolívar (English: Simon Bolivar Cup) was an international football competition organized by the Venezuelan Football Federation. The idea of this competition was to create a tournament among the champions clubs of the countries liberated by Simon Bolivar. It was played six times from its first edition in 1970 to the last in 1976, thus integrating the league champions clubs of Venezuela, Colombia, Peru, Ecuador and Bolivia. Due to its format, it was a historical precedent of the Copa Merconorte, played between the same Bolivarian countries or the Andean Community from 1998 until the 2001 edition.

América de Cali won the competition defeating Estudiantes de Mérida 2–1 in the Third Round.

== Teams ==
Association	Team (Berth)	Qualification method
Bolivia (1 berth)	The Strongest	1974 Primera División champions
Colombia (1 berth)	América de Cali	1974 Campeonato Profesional champions
Ecuador (1 berth)	LDU Quito	1974 Serie A champions
Venezuela (1 berth)	Estudiantes de Mérida	1974 Primera División First Stage winner

== Standings ==
Pos	Team	Pld	W	D	L	GF	GA	GD	Pts	Qualification or relegation
1	(Colombia) América de Cali	3	2	0	1	5	3	+2	4	Champion
2	(Venezuela) Estudiantes de Mérida	3	2	0	1	4	3	+1	4	
3	(Bolivia) The Strongest	3	2	0	1	4	3	+1	4	
4	(Ecuador) LDU Quito	3	0	0	3	2	6	−4	0	

=== First round ===
27 February 1976

(Venezuela) Estudiantes de Mérida	2–1	(Ecuador) LDU Quito

Estadio Guillermo Soto Rosa, Mérida
27 February 1976

(Bolivia) The Strongest	2–1	(Colombia) América de Cali

Estadio Guillermo Soto Rosa, Mérida

=== Second round ===
29 February 1976

(Venezuela) Estudiantes de Mérida	1–0	(Bolivia) The Strongest

Estadio Guillermo Soto Rosa, Mérida
29 February 1976

(Colombia) América de Cali	2–0	(Ecuador) LDU Quito

Estadio Guillermo Soto Rosa, Mérida

=== Third round ===
3 March 1976

(Bolivia) The Strongest	2–1	(Ecuador) LDU Quito

Estadio Guillermo Soto Rosa, Mérida
3 March 1976

(Venezuela) Estudiantes de Mérida	1–2	(Colombia) América de Cali

Estadio Guillermo Soto Rosa, Mérida

== See also ==
- International club competition records
- Copa Merconorte
- Copa Mercosur
- Torneio Mercosul
- CONMEBOL Cup
