= 1999 Copa Merconorte =

Copa Merconorte 1999

Tournament details
- Dates: 28 July – 22 December 1999
- Teams: 12 (from 5 associations)

Final positions
- Champions: (Colombia) América de Cali (1st title)
- Runners-up: (Colombia) Santa Fe

Tournament statistics
- Matches played: 42
- Goals scored: 122 (2.9 per match)
- Top scorer: (Venezuela) Juan Enrique García (6)

The 1999 Copa Merconorte was the 2nd edition of association football tournament Copa Merconorte held in 1999. América de Cali of Colombia beat Santa Fe also of Colombia in the final.

== Participants ==
Country	Team
Bolivia (1 berth)	The Strongest
Colombia (4 berths)	América de Cali
Colombia (4 berths)	Atlético Nacional
Colombia (4 berths)	Millonarios
Colombia (4 berths)	Santa Fe
Ecuador (3 berths)	Barcelona
Ecuador (3 berths)	El Nacional
Ecuador (3 berths)	Emelec
Peru (3 berths)	Alianza Lima
Peru (3 berths)	Sporting Cristal
Peru (3 berths)	Universitario
Venezuela (1 berth)	Caracas

== Group stage ==
Each team played the other teams in the group twice during the group stage. The first place team advanced to the second round.

=== Group A ===
Pos	Team	Pld	W	D	L	GF	GA	GD	Pts	Qualification	(Colombia) AME	(Ecuador) NAC	(Colombia) ATL	(Peru) UNI
1	(Colombia) América de Cali	6	4	2	0	13	8	+5	14	Advance to Semifinals	—	3–1	1–1	2–1
2	(Ecuador) El Nacional	6	2	1	3	10	14	−4	7		2–2	—	3–2	4–1
3	(Colombia) Atlético Nacional	6	1	3	2	11	9	+2	6		2–3	4–0	—	0–0
4	(Peru) Universitario	6	1	2	3	7	10	−3	5		1–2	2–0	2–2	—

=== Group B ===
Pos	Team	Pld	W	D	L	GF	GA	GD	Pts	Qualification	(Peru) ALI	(Ecuador) BAR	(Colombia) MIL	(Bolivia) STR
1	(Peru) Alianza Lima	6	4	1	1	8	4	+4	13	Advance to Semifinals	—	1–0	2–1	2–0
2	(Ecuador) Barcelona	6	2	3	1	9	5	+4	9		0–0	—	1–1	4–0
3	(Colombia) Millonarios	6	2	1	3	8	8	0	7		0–1	1–2	—	3–2
4	(Bolivia) The Strongest	6	1	1	4	7	15	−8	4		3–2	2–2	0–2	—

=== Group C ===
Pos	Team	Pld	W	D	L	GF	GA	GD	Pts	Qualification	(Colombia) SFE	(Venezuela) CAR	(Ecuador) EME	(Peru) CRI
1	(Colombia) Santa Fe	6	4	1	1	10	3	+7	13	Advance to Semifinals	—	3–0	2–0	2–0
2	(Venezuela) Caracas	6	4	0	2	9	8	+1	12	Advance to Semifinals	0–1	—	2–1	3–1
3	(Ecuador) Emelec	6	3	0	3	9	9	0	9		2–1	0–1	—	5–3
4	(Peru) Sporting Cristal	6	0	1	5	7	15	−8	1		1–1	2–3	0–1	—

== Semifinals ==
Team 1	Agg.	Team 2	1st leg	2nd leg
América de Cali (Colombia)	3–3 (4–3 p)	(Peru) Alianza Lima	3–1	0–2
Caracas (Venezuela)	2–2 (2–4 p)	(Colombia) Santa Fe	1–1	1–1

=== First leg ===
1 December 1999
20:05

América de Cali (Colombia)	3–1	(Peru) Alianza Lima
Téllez 43' 46' 76'		Chiquinho 81' (pen.)

Olímpico Pascual Guerrero, Cali
Referee: (Venezuela) Luis Solórzano

2 December 1999
21:10

Caracas (Venezuela)	1–1	(Colombia) Santa Fe
Rivas 67'		Cano 61'

Olímpico, Caracas
Referee: (Peru) José Arana Villamonte

=== Second leg ===
8 December 1999
20:10

Alianza Lima (Peru)	2–0	(Colombia) América de Cali
Llanos 76'; Baylón 82'
Penalties
Salazar (penalty scored); Chevez (penalty missed); Baylón (penalty scored); Hinostroza (penalty scored); Sáenz (penalty missed)	3–4	(penalty scored) Oviedo; (penalty scored) González; (penalty missed) Moreno; (penalty scored) Posada; (penalty scored) Gómez

Alejandro Villanueva, Lima
Referee: (Bolivia) René Ortubé

9 December 1999
20:10

Santa Fe (Colombia)	1–1	(Venezuela) Caracas
Díaz 87'		Vera 49'
Penalties
López (penalty scored); Vallecilla (penalty scored); Díaz (penalty scored); Rojas (penalty missed); Cano (penalty scored)	4–2	(penalty missed) Rivas; (penalty missed) Bidoglio; (penalty scored) Miranda; (penalty scored) Vera

El Campín, Bogotá
Referee: (Ecuador) José Carpio

== Finals ==
Team 1	Agg.	Team 2	1st leg	2nd leg
América de Cali (Colombia)	2–2 (5–3 p)	(Colombia) Santa Fe	1–2	1–0

=== First leg ===
15 December 1999
20:10

América de Cali (Colombia)	1–2	(Colombia) Santa Fe
Pérez 12'		Hernández 77'; Moreno 83'

Olímpico Pascual Guerrero, Cali
Referee: (Colombia) Henry Cervantes

=== Second leg ===
22 December 1999

Santa Fe (Colombia)	0–1	(Colombia) América de Cali
		Castillo 59'
Penalties
López (penalty scored); Díaz (penalty missed); González (penalty scored); Vallecilla (penalty scored)	3–5	(penalty scored) Moreno; (penalty scored) González; (penalty scored) Pérez; (penalty scored) Castillo; (penalty scored) Gómez

Estadio El Campín, Bogotá
Referee: (Colombia) John Jairo Toro

== Statistics ==
=== Top scorers ===
Rank	Player	Team	Total
1	(Venezuela) Juan Enrique García	(Venezuela) Caracas	6
2	(Colombia) Julián Téllez	(Colombia) América de Cali	5
3	(Bolivia) Guillermo Álvaro Peña	(Bolivia) The Strongest	3
3	(Peru) Roberto Holsen	(Peru) Sporting Cristal	3
3	(Colombia) Leonardo Fabio Moreno	(Colombia) América de Cali	3
3	(Colombia) Oswaldo Mackenzie	(Colombia) Atlético Nacional	3
3	(Colombia) Wilson Cano	(Colombia) Santa Fe	3
3	(Colombia) Nilson Pérez	(Colombia) América de Cali	3
3	(Argentina) Daniel Tílger	(Colombia) Millonarios	3
3	(Ecuador) Otilino Tenorio	(Ecuador) Emelec	3
3	(Ecuador) Nelson Antonio Palacios	(Ecuador) Emelec	3
