= Búhos ULVR F.C. =

Búhos ULVR
- Full name: Club Deportivo Búhos de la Universidad Laica Vicente Rocafuerte Fútbol Club
- Nickname(s): Los Búhos (Owls); La Bandada; El club del Futuro; Los Laicos (The Laics); El Equipo Universitario
- Founded: April 23, 1899; 126 years ago
- Ground: Modelo Alberto Spencer
- Capacity: 42,000
- Chairman: Susana Hinojosa
- Manager: Javier Torres
- League: Segunda Categoría
- 2023: Serie B, 10th (relegated)
- Website: https://www.buhosulvr.com/
Home colours	Away colours

Búhos ULVR Fútbol Club, formerly called Guayaquil Sport Club is an Ecuadorian football club based in Guayaquil. It was the first one in the country, having been founded on April 23, 1899 by Juan Wright and Roberto Wright, the two brothers who brought the sport to the country.

The club's only title came in the amateur era of Guayaquil football, when it won the regional league in 1943. It also played one season the top-flight Serie A in 1973, where it finished 12th. The club ceased operation in 1990 after 91 years of existence and has refounded on February 5, 2014.

== Honours ==
Segunda Categoría

- Winners (1): 2020

Campeonato Amateur del Guayas

- Winners (1): 1943

== Current squad ==
As of 21 February 2025

Note: Flags indicate national team as defined under FIFA eligibility rules; some limited exceptions apply. Players may hold more than one non-FIFA nationality.

No.	Pos.	Nation	Player
—	GK	(Ecuador) ECU	Víctor Valdez
—	GK	(Ecuador) ECU	Anthony Alvarado
—	DF	(Ecuador) ECU	Klever Caicedo
—	DF	(Ecuador) ECU	Rubén Cangá
—	DF	(Ecuador) ECU	Alex Vélez
—	DF	(Ecuador) ECU	Adrián Angulo
—	MF	(Ecuador) ECU	Lenín Porozo
—	MF	(Argentina) ARG	Tomás Cáceres
—	MF	(Ecuador) ECU	Lesther Solórzano
—	MF	(Ecuador) ECU	Alejandro Marinez

No.	Pos.	Nation	Player
—	MF	(Ecuador) ECU	Johan Caicedo
—	MF	(Ecuador) ECU	Carlos Moyano
—	MF	(Argentina) ARG	Samuel Rios
—	MF	(Ecuador) ECU	Jhon Almagro
—	FW	(Ecuador) ECU	José González
—	FW	(Ecuador) ECU	Carlos Ayoví
—	FW	(Ecuador) ECU	Deyvi Quiñónez
—	FW	(Argentina) ARG	Azarías Molina
—	FW	(Ecuador) ECU	Henrry Puga
