= Carlos Juárez (footballer) =

Ecuadorian footballer (born 1972)

Personal information
- Full name: Carlos Alberto Juárez Devico
- Date of birth: April 24, 1972 (age 54)
- Place of birth: Buenos Aires, Argentina
- Height: 1.92 m (6 ft 4 in)
- Position: Forward

Senior career*
Years	Team	Apps	(Gls)
1993–1994	Lanús	0	(0)
1994	Montevideo Wanderers		
1995	Lanús	8	(2)
1995	Santos Laguna	12	(3)
1996–1999	Emelec	133	(64)
2000	Sporting Cristal	21	(12)
2000–2003	Emelec	82	(45)
2003	Nacional	7	(4)
2004	Real Murcia	5	(0)
2004	LDU Quito	6	(3)
2005	Deportivo Quito	30	(12)
2006–2007	Nacional	28	(10)
2007–2008	Emelec	22	(6)

International career
2000	Ecuador	4	(0)
- * Club domestic league appearances and goals

Carlos Alberto Juárez Devico (born 24 April 1972 in Buenos Aires) is a retired footballer. Born in Argentina, he represented the Ecuador national team.

He has had a very long and successful career playing for several clubs all over the world, but he played most of his career in the Ecuadorian football league. especially for Ecuadorian giants Emelec, where he is its all time goal scorer and he is considered one of the best players the club has ever had.

== Early career ==
Juárez started his career playing for Argentine first division side Club Atlético Lanús, where he was quickly recognized as a promising talent for the future. In 1994, he was loaned to Uruguayan side Montevideo Wanderers where he had a fairly good season, and the next year he went back to Argentina to play for Lanus, and in 8 games he scored twice which got the attention of Mexican team Santos Laguna. He was signed by the Torreón side the same year. He did not have a good season playing for Santos and he was relegated to their reserve squad.

== Emelec ==
During his spell at Montevideo Wanderers former Emelec manager, Angel Castelnoble saw that Juárez had great talent and took advantage of his complicated situation in Mexico signing him for Emelec in 1996. On his debut match against Espoli, Emelec won 4–0, Juarez scored twice and made the other two assists for his teammate and good friend Ariel Graziani, giving a preview of things to come. Emelec fans immediately fell in love with the forward who is now, 12 years later, Emelec's all-time top goal scorer with over 130 goals.

Emelec rivals recognized Juárez as a major threat to their interests in every game and they used to change their defensive style to cope with his large physique. This and Juarez great accuracy and vision to assist his teammates helped so that other forwards such as Ariel Graziani (twice), Jaime Ivan Kaviedes, Otelino Tenorio and Alejandro Kenig become Ecuadorian league top goal scorer. In 2001, Juarez managed to get that title for himself scoring 17 goals, and helping Emelec win the Ecuadorian League title.

During his several years playing for Emelec, Juárez left Ecuador for short periods of time to play for Peruvian team Sporting Cristal, where he became an idol, and Uruguayan side Nacional de Montevideo, where he also had a very good season. Every year speculation over his future at Emelec aroused and every year he stayed because of the high fee Emelec's management asked for Juárez's contract and because Bossman's law was not applied in Ecuador at the time. To keep him satisfied Emelec officials paid Juárez the highest salary of the Ecuadorian league. However, in 2004 this was insufficient to convince him to stay and he left Emelec for free, to play for Spanish side Real Murcia, becoming the first Ecuadorian player to take advantage of Bossman's law.

Overall Juárez played most of his career from 1996 to 2003 at Emelec, and with his help the "electricos" won two national championships in 2001 and 2002, and were runners-up in 1996, and 1998; he also played 6 Copa Libertadores and 3 Copa Merconortes, and in 2001 he was part of the Emelec squad that was runner up for the defunct Copa Merconorte.

Juárez will be remembered by Emelec's fans for his performances and love for the club, especially for his header in the last game of the 2001 season against El Nacional which gave the club its first title in 7 years and also because during his career he was tempted several times by Emelec's archrival Barcelona, and he always turned them down. His identification with Emelec is so strong that many times during matches against Barcelona he would wear T-shirts with sentences on them to taunt his rivals.

== Ecuadorian citizenship ==
After playing and living for over 3 years in Ecuador he decided to become an Ecuadorian citizen. He was naturalized in 1999 and in 2000 he made his debut with the Ecuador national team in the Japan-Korea FIFA world cup qualifiers match against Paraguay.

Despite being one of the most successful forwards in the Ecuadorian league he did not have many opportunities with the Ecuador National Team, Ecuador's coach at the time, Colombian Hernán Darío Gómez, considered his and fellow nationalized player Ariel Graziani's presence to be negative for the group inside the national squad.

== Doping ==
He was not successful playing in Spain for Real Murcia and in 2005 he returned to Ecuador to play for LDU Quito. He had very few games for the "albos" when after a Copa Sudamericana match he tested positive for cocaine and he was suspended for 6 months.

Rumors of drug abuse where always present during Juarez's career but were always denied by the player. The 6 months suspension was the first clear proof that Juárez was involved in drug consumption. However, to this day, Juárez denies these accusations and claims his urine sample was switched on that test.

== The comeback ==
In 2005, he completed his suspension and was signed by Deportivo Quito and after a slow start to regain form he managed to score 12 goals that season. The next season, he was re-signed by former Uruguayan team Nacional de Montevideo where he was used in the rotation of the squad. In a 2007 Copa Libertadores match against Emelec in Montevideo, Nacional won 3-1 and an extremely overweight Juárez scored the Uruguayans'last goal, he was very respectful and did not celebrate the goal. However, the result sealed Emelec's elimination from the tournament that year.

After Emelec's elimination from the Copa Libertadores, the club management decided to bring back Juárez to play one last time for Emelec. When he arrived in Ecuador he needed some time to get back in shape, it was said that he was around 40 pounds overweight, but when he got back in shape the impact of his presence was immediate. Juárez scored 6 goals and made 5 assists in 17 games for Emelec that season, and in a match against Deportivo Cuenca he scored his 134th goal for the club which made him Emelec's all-time top goal scorer, surpassing the 133 goals of former Emelec's glory, Jesus Cardenas. Despite his good performances Emelec did not qualify for the final stages of the Ecuadorian league and Juárez went back to Argentina, expecting to be recalled for the next season.

When Emelec was disqualified from the 2007 Ecuadorian Championship, the club held elections to select a new management. New president Elias Wated and his group work, publicly disregarded Juárez as a signing for 2008, they said that he was too old, too fat, too slow, too problematic but overall too expensive for Emelec's budget.

For the 2008 season, the new management struggled to find good national and foreign players especially forwards, in the meantime Juárez was in Argentina handling personal businesses, later he would publicly confess that at the time he thought he was a retired player. Emelec's bad results contributed so that an Ecuadorian sports store decided to help the club and offered to sign Juárez for Emelec and pay all expenses. At first the team's management was reluctant to accept this, but after the bad run continued and the pressure from the press and most importantly the fans grew, they decided to accept Juárez's return. He is now part of Emelec's squad and has played in 4 games and has made 1 assists for the team which is fighting to qualify for the last stages of the league.
