= Jersson González =

Colombian footballer (born 1975)

Personal information
- Full name: Jersson Amur González Díaz
- Date of birth: 16 January 1975 (age 51)
- Place of birth: Cali, Colombia
- Height: 1.74 m (5 ft 9 in)
- Position: Defender

Senior career*
Years	Team	Apps	(Gls)
1993–2002	América de Cali	238	(21)
2002	Galatasaray	1	(0)
2002	River Plate	6	(0)
2003	Centauros Villavicencio	19	(1)
2003–2005	América de Cali	56	(7)
2005–2006	Deportivo Pereira	32	(9)
2006–2007	Boyacá Chicó	60	(14)
2008–2009	América de Cali	41	(4)
2010	Atlético Bucaramanga	0	(0)
2011	América de Cali	11	(1)
Total		464	(57)

International career
1995–2001	Colombia	18	(1)

Managerial career
- 2013: Boyacá Chicó U20
- 2014–2017: América de Cali U20
- 2018: América de Cali (women)
- 2018–2019: América de Cali (assistant)
- 2018: América de Cali (caretaker)
- 2019: América de Cali (caretaker)
- 2020–2022: América de Cali U20
- 2021: América de Cali (caretaker)
- 2022–2023: Llaneros
- 2024: Deportivo Pasto
- * Club domestic league appearances and goals

Jersson Amur González Díaz (born 16 January 1975) is a Colombian football manager and former footballer who played as a defender or a defensive midfielder.

González was notable for being an experienced free-kick taker and possessing great ball control.

== Club career ==
He is considered an América de Cali legend, winning four league titles with the club in 1997, 2000, 2001 and 2008, as well as the 1999 Copa Merconorte. He made 384 appearances and scored 29 goals with the club, putting him at position #8 in the club's list for most appearances.

In 2002 he had short spells at Galatasaray and River Plate. In 2003 he played with Centauros. After a second return to America de Cali, he played with Deportivo Pereira for a year and then had a successful period at Boyaca Chico, scoring 14 goals in 60 games. In 2012 he retired from the sport.

== International career ==
González played for Colombia at the 1993 FIFA World Youth Championship in Australia.

He was part of the Colombian national team, making his debut in 1995, and was part of the squad that won the 2001 Copa América.

== Coaching career ==
González started his coaching career in 2013, when he became manager of Boyacá Chicó's U20 squad.

From 2014 to 2017, González was the manager of América de Cali's U20 squad. Through a video broadcast by América de Cali on its official YouTube channel, it was learned that Jersson González was appointed as the new manager of the women's team for the 2018 season.

On 20 August 2018, he was appointed caretaker manager for the first team of América de Cali. He was in charge for one game against Millonarios which he lost 0-2 and was replaced a few days later by a newly appointed manager. After Fernando Castro Lozada was fired on 15 April 2019, González was once again appointed caretaker manager, this time until the end of the season. He was recalled by América de Cali as caretaker on 28 April 2021, replacing Juan Cruz Real for the return leg of the quarter-finals of the 2021 Apertura tournament against Millonarios and four Copa Libertadores group stage games.

Following the end of América's involvement at the Copa Libertadores, he returned to the club's youth ranks, resigning on 2 April 2022 to become manager of Llaneros in the Colombian second division for his first professional manager job. González managed Llaneros until the end of the 2023 season, and on 16 November 2023 he was announced as manager of top-tier club Deportivo Pasto for the 2024 season. He was dismissed from the position on 25 February 2024, after a poor start to the season that saw Pasto collect only four points in their first eight league matches.
