= 1995 Copa Interamericana =

1997 Copa Interamericana
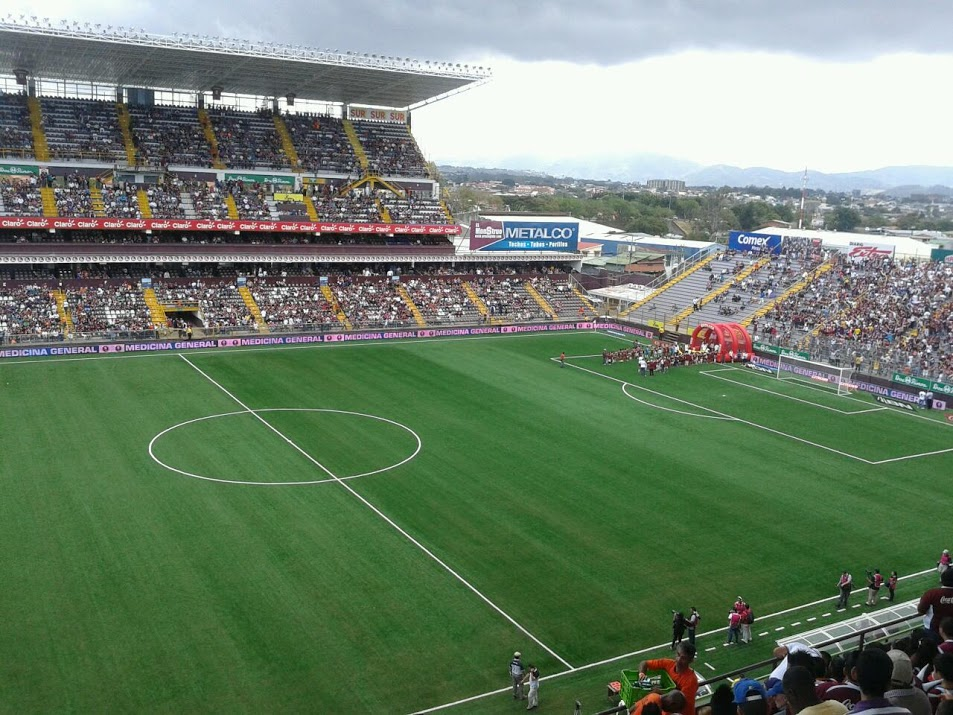
- Estadio Ricardo Saprissa, venue
- Event: Copa Interamericana
Saprissa	Atlético Nacional
(Costa Rica)	(Colombia)
2	3
- Date: 3 April 1997
- Venue: Ricardo Saprissa, San José
- Referee: Gilberto Alcalá (Mexico)
- Attendance: 15,000

The 1997 Copa Interamericana was the 17th. edition of the Copa Interamericana. The final took place between Costa Rican club Deportivo Saprissa (winner of 1995 CONCACAF Champions' Cup) and Colombian side Atlético Nacional (1995 Copa Libertadores runner-up so current champion Grêmio declined to participate.

Unlike previous editions, the final was staged over just one match, being held on April 3, 1997, in San José, Costa Rica. Atlético Nacional beat Saprissa 3–2, winning their second Copa Interamericana trophy. Furthermore, they are the only team from Colombia to have win the competition.

== Qualified teams ==
Team	Qualification	Previous app.
(Colombia) Atlético Nacional	1995 Copa Libertadores finalist	**1989**
(Costa Rica) Saprissa	1995 CONCACAF Champions' Cup champion	1993

Bold indicates winning years

== Match details ==
1995 Copa Interamericana
April 3, 1997

Saprissa (Costa Rica)	2–3	(Colombia) Atlético Nacional
Mahía 38'; Wanchope 89'		Comas 27'; G. Gómez 35'; Gaviria 70'

Estadio Ricardo Saprissa, San José
Attendance: 15,000
Referee: Gilberto Alcalá (Mexico)

**Saprissa**	**Atl. Nacional**

GK	(Costa Rica) Erick Lonnis
DF	(Costa Rica) Vladimir Quesada
DF	(Costa Rica) Ronald González
DF	(Costa Rica) José Torres
DF	(Costa Rica) Jervis Drummond
MF	(Costa Rica) Mauricio Wright
MF	(Costa Rica) Douglas Sequeira
MF	(Costa Rica) Marco Herrera	(substituted off) 75'
MF	(Costa Rica) Alejandro Sequeira
FW	(Costa Rica) Gerald Drummond
FW	(Argentina) Adrián Mahía
Substitutes :
FW	(Costa Rica) Javier Wanchope	(substituted on) 75'
Manager:
(Argentina) Jorge Olguín

GK	(Colombia) René Higuita
DF	(Colombia) Santander Ospina
DF	(Colombia) Luis Carlos Perea
DF	(Colombia) Iván Córdoba
DF	(Colombia) Francisco Mosquera
MF	(Colombia) Neider Morantes
MF	(Colombia) Dumar Rueda
FW	(Colombia) Hermán Gaviria
FW	(Colombia) Jhon Jaime Gómez (substituted off) 80'
FW	(Colombia) Alexis García
FW	(Colombia) Alex Comas (substituted off) 78'
Substitutes :
FW	(Colombia) Juan Pablo Ángel	(substituted on) 78'
FW	(Colombia) León Muñoz	(substituted on) 80'
Manager:
(Colombia) Norberto Peluffo
