= 1973 Campeonato Ecuatoriano de Fútbol Serie A =

Ecuadorian Serie A
- Season: 1973
- Champions: El Nacional
- Copa Libertadores: El Nacional; Universidad Católica

The 1973 Campeonato Ecuatoriano de Fútbol Serie A, the first division of Ecuadorian football (soccer), was played by 12 teams. The champion was El Nacional.

== First stage ==
Pos	Team	Pld	W	D	L	GF	GA	GD	Pts	Qualification or relegation
1	Barcelona	22	10	9	3	34	17	+17	29	Qualified to the Second Stage
2	Universidad Católica	22	10	8	4	25	24	+1	28	Qualified to the Second Stage
3	El Nacional	22	8	11	3	28	22	+6	27	Qualified to the Second Stage
4	LDU Portoviejo	22	9	8	5	38	24	+14	26	Qualified to the Second Stage
5	América de Quito	22	9	4	9	30	24	+6	22	Qualified to the Second Stage
6	Deportivo Quito	22	8	6	8	32	35	−3	22	Qualified to the Second Stage
7	9 de Octubre	22	7	7	8	25	21	+4	21	Qualified to the Second Stage
8	Emelec	22	9	3	10	29	27	+2	21	Qualified to the Second Stage
9	Macará	22	7	7	8	34	39	−5	21	Qualified to the Liguilla No Descenso
10	Deportivo Cuenca	22	8	4	10	25	23	+2	20	Qualified to the Liguilla No Descenso
11	Atlético Riobamba	22	3	8	11	20	44	−24	14	Qualified to the Liguilla No Descenso
12	Guayaquil Sport	22	5	3	14	20	40	−20	13	Qualified to the Liguilla No Descenso

Source: RSSSF - 1972 Serie A

== Liguilla del No Descenso ==
Pos	Team	Pld	W	D	L	GF	GA	GD	Pts	Qualification or relegation
1	Deportivo Cuenca	12	7	3	2	21	5	+16	17	
2	Macará	12	4	5	3	18	13	+5	13	
3	Atlético Riobamba	12	1	7	4	5	12	−7	9	Relegated to the Segunda Categoría del Guayas
4	Guayaquil Sport	12	2	5	5	10	23	−13	9	Relegated to the Segunda Categoría de Chimborazo

Source: RSSSF - 1972 Serie A

== Second stage ==
Pos	Team	Pld	W	D	L	GF	GA	GD	Pts	Qualification or relegation
1	Universidad Católica	14	8	3	3	21	10	+11	19	Qualified to the Liguilla Final
2	El Nacional	14	6	6	2	27	13	+14	18	Qualified to the Liguilla Final
3	Deportivo Quito	14	7	4	3	23	21	+2	18	
4	Emelec	14	7	3	4	24	18	+6	17	
5	Barcelona	14	5	3	6	19	20	−1	13	Qualified to the Liguilla Final
6	LDU Portoviejo	14	2	7	5	11	20	−9	11	
7	América de Quito	14	2	6	6	9	21	−12	10	Relegated to the Serie B
8	9 de Octubre	14	0	6	8	9	20	−11	6	Relegated to the Serie B

Source: RSSSF - 1973 Serie A

== Liguilla Final ==
=== Semifinals ===
6 January 1974

El Nacional	3–2	Barcelona

13 January 1974

Barcelona	3–1	El Nacional

20 January 1974

El Nacional	2–0	Barcelona

== Finals ==
=== First leg ===
27 January 1974

El Nacional	2–0	Universidad Católica

=== Second leg ===
3 February 1974

Universidad Católica	3–3	El Nacional
