= Francisco Mosquera (footballer) =

Colombian footballer (born 1973)

Personal information
- Date of birth: 5 November 1973 (age 52)
- Place of birth: Medellín, Colombia

International career
Years	Team	Apps	(Gls)
1996–1997	Colombia	2	(0)

Francisco Mosquera (born 5 November 1973) is a Colombian footballer. He played in two matches for the Colombia national football team from 1996 to 1997. He was also part of Venezuela's squad for the 1997 Copa América tournament.
