= 1974 Copa Libertadores =

15th season of Copa Libertadores

1974 Copa Libertadores de América
Tournament details
- Dates: February 5 – October 19
- Teams: 21 (from 10 associations)

Final positions
- Champions: (Argentina) Independiente (5th title)
- Runners-up: (Brazil) São Paulo

Tournament statistics
- Matches played: 76
- Goals scored: 180 (2.37 per match)

The Copa Libertadores 1974 was the 15th edition of the Copa Libertadores, CONMEBOL's annual international club tournament. Defending champions Independiente won the competition, bagging their third consecutive and a record-extending fifth title.

== Qualified teams ==
Country	Team	Qualification method
CONMEBOL (1 berth)	Independiente	1973 Copa Libertadores champion
Argentina (2 berths)	Rosario Central	1973 Nacional champion
Argentina (2 berths)	Huracán	1973 Metropolitano champion
Bolivia (2 berths)	Jorge Wilstermann	1973 Primera División champion
Bolivia (2 berths)	Deportivo Municipal	1973 Primera División runner-up
Brazil (2 berths)	Palmeiras	1973 Campeonato Brasileiro Série A champion
Brazil (2 berths)	São Paulo	1973 Campeonato Brasileiro Série A runner-up
Chile (2 berths)	Unión Española	1973 Primera División champion
Chile (2 berths)	Colo-Colo	1973 Primera División runner-up
Colombia (2 berths)	Atlético Nacional	1973 Campeonato Profesional champion
Colombia (2 berths)	Millonarios	1973 Campeonato Profesional runner-up
Ecuador (2 berths)	El Nacional	1973 Campeonato Ecuatoriano champion
Ecuador (2 berths)	Universidad Católica	1973 Campeonato Ecuatoriano runner-up
Paraguay (2 berths)	Cerro Porteño	1973 Primera División champion
Paraguay (2 berths)	Olimpia	1973 Primera División runner-up
Peru (2 berths)	Defensor Lima	1973 Primera División champion
Peru (2 berths)	Sporting Cristal	1973 Primera División runner-up
Uruguay (2 berths)	Peñarol	1973 Primera División champion
Uruguay (2 berths)	Nacional	1973 Primera División runner-up
Venezuela (2 berths)	Portuguesa	1973 Primera División champion
Venezuela (2 berths)	Valencia	1973 Primera División runner-up

== Draw ==
The champions and runners-up of each football association were drawn into the same group along with another football association's participating teams. Three clubs from Argentina competed as Independiente was champion of the 1973 Copa Libertadores. They entered the tournament in the Semifinals.

Group 1	Group 2	Group 3	Group 4	Group 5
Argentina; Chile	Bolivia; Brazil	Colombia; Venezuela	Ecuador; Peru	Paraguay; Uruguay

== Group stage ==
=== Group 1 ===
Pos	Team	Pld	W	D	L	GF	GA	GD	Pts	Qualification or relegation	(Argentina) HUR	(Argentina) ROS	(Chile) UNI	(Chile) COL
1	(Argentina) Huracán	6	5	0	1	13	4	+9	10	Qualified to the Semifinals	—	1–0	5–1	2–0
2	(Argentina) Rosario Central	6	5	0	1	11	2	+9	10		1–0	—	4–0	2–0
3	(Chile) Unión Española	6	2	0	4	6	14	−8	4		1–3	0–1	—	2–1
4	(Chile) Colo-Colo	6	0	0	6	3	13	−10	0		1–2	1–3	0–2	—

==== Tiebreaker ====
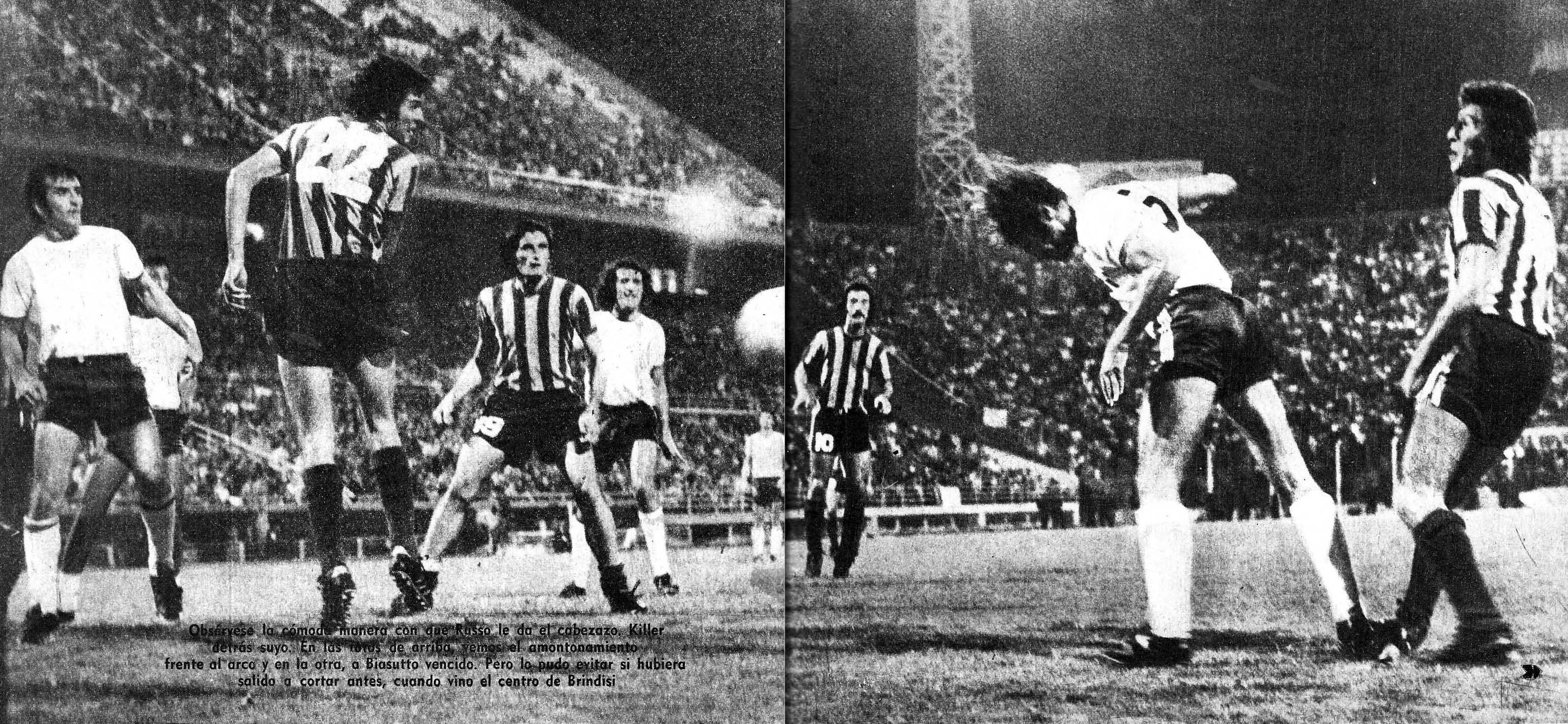
Huracán v Rosario Central tiebreaker at Vélez Sarsfield Stadium

Team 1	Score	Team 2
Huracán (Argentina)	4–0	(Argentina) Rosario Central

=== Group 2 ===
Pos	Team	Pld	W	D	L	GF	GA	GD	Pts	Qualification or relegation	(Brazil) SAO	(Brazil) PAL	(Bolivia) MUN	(Bolivia) WIL
1	(Brazil) São Paulo	6	4	2	0	14	5	+9	10	Qualified to the Semifinals	—	2–0	3–3	5–0
2	(Brazil) Palmeiras	6	3	0	3	7	5	+2	6		1–2	—	3–0	2–0
3	(Bolivia) Deportivo Municipal	6	1	2	3	9	11	−2	4		1–1	0–1	—	5–2
4	(Bolivia) Jorge Wilstermann	6	2	0	4	4	13	−9	4		0–1	1–0	1–0	—

=== Group 3 ===
Pos	Team	Pld	W	D	L	GF	GA	GD	Pts	Qualification or relegation	(Colombia) MIL	(Colombia) NAC	(Venezuela) POR	(Venezuela) VAL
1	(Colombia) Millonarios	6	4	1	1	10	6	+4	9	Qualified to the Semifinals	—	2–1	2–1	2–1
2	(Colombia) Atlético Nacional	6	3	1	2	8	7	+1	7		0–3	—	3–0	2–1
3	(Venezuela) Portuguesa	6	2	2	2	4	5	−1	6		2–0	0–0	—	0–0
4	(Venezuela) Valencia	6	0	2	4	4	8	−4	2		1–1	1–2	0–1	—

=== Group 4 ===
Pos	Team	Pld	W	D	L	GF	GA	GD	Pts	Qualification or relegation	(Peru) DEF	(Ecuador) NAC	(Ecuador) CAT	(Peru) SCR
1	(Peru) Defensor Lima	6	4	1	1	7	2	+5	9	Qualified to the Semifinals	—	2–1	1–0	2–0
2	(Ecuador) El Nacional	6	3	2	1	9	3	+6	8		0–0	—	2–0	3–0
3	(Ecuador) Universidad Católica	6	1	2	3	2	5	−3	4		1–0	0–0	—	0–0
4	(Peru) Sporting Cristal	6	1	1	4	3	11	−8	3		0–2	1–3	2–1	—

=== Group 5 ===
Pos	Team	Pld	W	D	L	GF	GA	GD	Pts	Qualification or relegation	(Uruguay) PEÑ	(Paraguay) CER	(Paraguay) OLI	(Uruguay) NAC
1	(Uruguay) Peñarol	6	3	2	1	5	3	+2	8	Qualified to the Semifinals	—	1–0	0–0	0–2
2	(Paraguay) Cerro Porteño	6	2	3	1	7	6	+1	7		1–1	—	1–0	2–2
3	(Paraguay) Olimpia	6	1	3	2	4	5	−1	5		0–2	1–1	—	2–0
4	(Uruguay) Nacional	6	1	2	3	6	8	−2	4		0–1	1–2	1–1	—

== Semi-finals ==
=== Group 1 ===
Pos	Team	Pld	W	D	L	GF	GA	GD	Pts	Qualification or relegation	(Argentina) IND	(Uruguay) PEÑ	(Argentina) HUR
1	(Argentina) Independiente	4	2	2	0	8	4	+4	6	Qualified to the Final	—	1–1	3–0
2	(Uruguay) Peñarol	4	1	2	1	7	5	+2	4		2–3	—	1–1
3	(Argentina) Huracán	4	0	2	2	2	8	−6	2		1–1	0–3	—

=== Group 2 ===
Pos	Team	Pld	W	D	L	GF	GA	GD	Pts	Qualification or relegation	(Brazil) SAO	(Colombia) MIL	(Peru) DEF
1	(Brazil) São Paulo	4	3	1	0	9	0	+9	7	Qualified to the Final	—	4–0	4–0
2	(Colombia) Millonarios	4	2	1	1	5	5	0	5		0–0	—	1–0
3	(Peru) Defensor Lima	4	0	0	4	1	10	−9	0		0–1	1–4	—

== Finals ==
12 October 1974

São Paulo	2–1	Independiente
Rocha 48'; Mirandinha 50'		Saggioratto 28'

Estadio do Pacaembu, São Paulo
Attendance: 51.000
Referee: Pérez (Peru)
16 October 1974

Independiente	2–0	São Paulo
Bochini 34'; Balbuena 48'

Estadio Libertadores de América, Avellaneda
Attendance: 55.000
Referee: Barreto (Uruguay)

Replay match at Estadio Nacional in Santiago, Chile.

19 October 1974

Independiente	1–0	São Paulo
Pavoni 37'

Estadio Nacional, Santiago
Attendance: 60.000

Copa Libertadores
1974 Winner

Independiente
Fifth Title
