= Balbuena =

Balbuena is a surname. Notable people with the surname include:

- Agustín Balbuena (1945–2021), Argentinian footballer
- Bernardo de Balbuena (1561–1627), Spanish poet
- Danielle Balbuena (born 1997), American hip hop artist, better known by the stage name 070 Shake
- Edgar Balbuena (born 1980), Paraguayan footballer
- Fabián Balbuena (born 1991), Paraguayan footballer
- Fermín Balbuena (born 1962), Paraguayan footballer and manager
- Guillermina López Balbuena (born 1973), Mexican politician
- José Balbuena (1917–2009), Peruvian-Chilean footballer
- Norman Balbuena (born 1986), Filipino actor, comedian and television host better known by the stage name Boobay
- Patricia Balbuena, Peruvian lawyer and public servant

== See also ==
- Balbuena metro station, in Mexico City, Mexico
