= Ospina Coffee Company =

Colombian coffee company

Ospina Coffee
- Headquarters: Charlotte, North Carolina
- Products: Ospina Dynasty Coffee, Premier Grand Cru, Grand Reserve, Ospina Presidential Coffee, Ospina Estate Coffee, Ospina Bambuco Coffee
- Divisions: Europe, Asia, Middle East, South America and North America
- Website: www.ospinacoffee.com

Ospina Coffee was established in Colombia, by Don Mariano Ospina Rodríguez in 1835. Ospina Rodríguez was one of the pioneers of coffee growing in Colombia and in Guatemala.

== Summary ==
Three Colombian presidents were part of this family business, including Mariano Ospina Rodríguez (1857–1861), Pedro Nel Ospina (1922–1926) and Mariano Ospina Pérez (1946–1950). Ospina Pérez was one of the founding fathers of the National Federation of Coffee Growers of Colombia.

Ospina Coffee originated in Colombia's volcanic highlands of the Andes, South America, founded by Ospina Rodríguez, who started his coffee business in 1835. His experimental farm at Fredonia, Antioquia served as a model finca cafetera (coffee plantation) for Colombian coffee growers in the late nineteenth century.

Harvard Professor June Erlick, author of the book "Una Gringa en Bogotá," explains that "Coffee in Colombia was traditionally grown by very small farmers." She says the Ospinas helped to change the way the world viewed coffee. "The Ospina family was the first, or certainly one of the first, to see coffee as a larger crop and business."

== History ==
Mariano Ospina Rodríguez established his first experimental plantation in 1835, in the municipality of Fredonia, Antioquia.

After Ospina Rodríguez and his brother Pastor escaped from prison into exile, in 1862, they settled in Guatemala. Factors cited in their having been able to distinguish themselves there include success in inserting themselves into Guatemala's political and economic activities, access to international credit, solid family alliances, and, in particular, their experience as the owners of “Las Mercedes”, one of the largest and most famous coffee plantations of Central America in those times.

In 1863, Ospina Rodríguez, former President of the Granadine Confederation (now Colombia), arrived in Guatemala with his wife Enriqueta Vásquez, his four younger children and his brother Pastor. They had been granted political asylum by the Guatemalan government. They settled in the Pacific piedmont region called “Costa Cuca”, where they established their main coffee plantation “Las Mercedes”. This coffee plantation became known throughout Central America as the most productive and best managed.

Mariano Ospina Rodríguez returned to Colombia with his wife Enriqueta and their children in October 1871. They relocated in the town of Fredonia, Antioquia, where they continued with their coffee business, enterprise and plantations.

In 1880, the National Press (of Colombia) published the first instruction manual for coffee growing, written by Ospina Rodríguez, titled “Cultivo del Café: Nociones Elementales al alcance de todos los labradores” (Coffee Growing: Basic notions available to all farmers). Ospina Rodríguez dedicated much of his efforts to educating others about coffee. In 1931, a second instruction manual for coffee growers was published under the direction of his grandson, Mariano Ospina Pérez, as General Manager of the National Federation of Coffee Growers of Colombia.

In 1882, Ospina Rodríguez and his two sons, Mariano and Tulio, established their first of several large scale coffee plantations and organized their larger coffee processing plants and facilities ("despulpadoras" or “edificios del café”) in “El Cerro Bravo”, of Fredonia, Antioquia. The first mechanized pulpers and mills were introduced and operated in these plantations.

Colombian President Pedro Nel Ospina, son of Ospina Rodríguez, took over the business in 1879.

By 1888, the best known coffee plantations in Antioquia were: “Jonas”, belonging to Mariano Ospina Vásquez, “El Amparo”, belonging to Tulio Ospina Vásquez, “La Caraboya”, belonging to the Barrientos brothers and “Gualanday”, belonging to the heirs of General Rafael Uribe Uribe. These four coffee plantations produced 46% of the coffee grown in Antioquia.

The Ospina coffee operations (growing, processing and exports to Europe and USA) were all directed by Ospina Rodríguez until the day of his death, on January 11, 1885, in Medellín.

General Pedro Nel Ospina, besides managing his family's private coffee enterprises, contributed as well to the Colombian coffee industry. He used his ambassadorship to the United States in 1910 as an opportunity to promote the industry. Elected president in 1922, he established the Banco de la Republica (Central Bank) and advanced the national railway system to facilitate the commerce and export of coffee.

At the death of Tulio Ospina Vásquez, his son, Mariano Ospina Pérez, inherited several of the plantations. Ospina Pérez also took over the business. He later founded the National Federation of Coffee Growers of Colombia, organizing the nation's coffee industry and making it one of the leading commodities produced in the country. In 1946 Ospina Pérez was elected president of Colombia. Current Ospina Coffee owner Mariano Ospina states that it was Ospina Pérez who envisioned the creation of the fictional character Juan Valdez, the TV pitchman with his burro, who came to symbolize coffee from Colombia.
