= Héctor Ferri =

Ecuadorian footballer (born 1968)

Personal information
- Full name: Héctor Américo Ferri
- Date of birth: October 17, 1968 (age 58)
- Place of birth: Ecuador
- Position: Midfielder

Senior career*
Years	Team	Apps	(Gls)
1988–1997	Aucas	150	(18)
1994	→ Emelec (loan)	6	(0)
1995	→ Deportivo Quito (loan)	27	(0)
1998–2001	El Nacional	103	(13)
2001–2002	L.D.U. Quito	40	(3)
2003–2004	ESPOLI	39	(0)
2007	Cuniburo FC	4	(0)
2012	Teodoro Gómez	1	(0)
Total		370	(34)

International career^{‡}
1992–2000	Ecuador	6	(0)
- * Club domestic league appearances and goals as of 8 June 2009 ‡ National team caps and goals as of 9 July 2007

Héctor Américo Ferri (born October 16, 1968) is a retired footballer from Ecuador who played as a midfielder during his professional career.

== International career ==
He obtained a total number of six caps (no goals) for the Ecuadorian national side, making his debut on November 24, 1992, in a friendly match against Peru.
