= Sandro Baylón =

Peruvian footballer (1977–2000)

Personal information
- Full name: Sandro Paulo Baylón Capcha
- Date of birth: 11 April 1977
- Place of birth: Lima, Peru
- Date of death: 1 January 2000 (aged 22)
- Place of death: Lima, Peru
- Height: 1.79 m (5 ft 10 in)
- Position: Defender

Youth career
- Alianza Lima

Senior career*
Years	Team	Apps	(Gls)
1996–1999	Alianza Lima	60	(9)
1996	→ Bella Esperanza (loan)		

International career
1999	Peru	1	(0)
- * Club domestic league appearances and goals

Sandro Paulo Baylón Capcha (11 April 1977 – 1 January 2000) was a Peruvian professional footballer who played as defender.

== Playing career ==
Nephew of Julio Baylón, a former star of Alianza Lima, Sandro Baylón trained in the club's lower divisions before being loaned to Bella Esperanza, a second-division club and Alianza's feeder team, in 1996. Spotted by Jorge Luis Pinto, then coach of Alianza Lima, he was included in the first team. Sandro Baylón made his debut in the first division on 20 September 1997, in a 4–0 victory over José Gálvez FBC. He would go on to win the Peruvian championship at the end of the season.

His good performances in the league earned him a call-up from Francisco Maturana to the Peruvian national team on 17 November 1999, for a friendly match in Lima against Slovakia (2–1 victory).

== Death ==
Although he was destined for a bright future (he was approached by emissaries from Werder Bremen in 1999), Sandro Baylón died in a road accident on 1 January 2000. He was barely 22 years old and his death caused a stir in Peruvian public opinion; more than 10,000 people attended his funeral in the Alejandro Villanueva Stadium.

== Honours ==
Alianza Lima

- Torneo Descentralizado: 1997
