= Santander Ospina =

Colombian footballer (born 1974)

Personal information
- Date of birth: January 28, 1974 (age 52)
- Place of birth: Turbo, Antioquia, Colombia
- Position: Defender

Senior career*
Years	Team	Apps	(Gls)
1994–	Atlético Nacional		
2004–2005	Boyacá Chico		
2008	Millonarios		
- * Club domestic league appearances and goals

Santander Ospina born January 28, 1974, is a retired Colombian football defender.
