= Deportivo Galicia =

Venezuelan football club

Galicia de Aragua
- Full name: Galicia de Aragua
- Founded: September 19, 1960; 65 years ago
- Dissolved: 2002 (became Aragua F.C.)
- Ground: Estadio Brígido Iriarte; Caracas, Venezuela
- Capacity: 15,000
- League: Segunda División Venezolana
Home colours	Away colours

Deportivo Galicia Fútbol Club (later Galicia de Aragua) was a traditional football club from Venezuela that competed in Segunda División Venezolana.

== History ==
Founded in Caracas, the club moved, in 2002, to Maracay, in the state of Aragua, when its name changed to Galicia de Aragua, playing their home games at the Giuseppe Antonelli stadium in Maracay. Coached by the Uruguayan national Carlos MarÍa Ravel, the team switched from their traditional blue and white colours to the state's yellow and red and changed their name to Galicia de Aragua.

At the end of the 2001–02 season, Deportivo Galicia was relegated to the Venezuelan Segunda Division. In January 2002 they became a separate entity Aragua F.C. when they moved to Estadio Olímpico Hermanos Ghersi Páez.

Deportivo Galicia had Caracas as main training city, allowing many young prospects to play for this team, looking to get exposed in the league. Some of the solid players that were part of the squad that moved on to other bigger club as players and/or managers are: Edson Tortolero, Alejandro Clemente, Pedro Delgado, Stalin Rivas, Fernando Clemente, Pedro Millán, Ángel Rivillo, Hugo Savarese and Ramón López.

== Honours ==
=== National ===
- Primera División Venezolana
  - Winners (4): 1964, 1969, 1970, 1974
- Copa de Venezuela
  - Winners (5): 1966, 1967, 1969, 1979, 1981
- Segunda División Venezolana
  - Winners (3): 1988, 1992, 2001
- Tercera División Venezolana
  - Winners (1): 2000

=== International ===
- Copa Simón Bolívar
  - Winners (1): 1971

== Performance in CONMEBOL competitions ==
- Copa Libertadores: 9 appearances

1965: First Round
1967: First Round
1968: First Round

1970: First Round
1971: First Round
1975: First Round

1976: First Round
1979: First Round
1980: First Round

=== Matches ===
Season	Competition	Round	Country	Club	Home	Away	Aggregate	Result
1965	Copa Libertadores	Group 3	Paraguay	Guaraní	1–2	1–2	3rd place	Eliminated
1965	Copa Libertadores	Group 3	Uruguay	Peñarol	W/O ^{[A]}	0–2	3rd place	Eliminated
1967	Copa Libertadores	Group 1	Venezuela	Deportivo Italia	0–0	0–1	4th place	Eliminated
1967	Copa Libertadores	Group 1	Brazil	Cruzeiro	0–1	1–3	4th place	Eliminated
1967	Copa Libertadores	Group 1	Peru	Sport Boys	2–1	0–2	4th place	Eliminated
1967	Copa Libertadores	Group 1	Peru	Universitario	2–0	0–2	4th place	Eliminated
1968	Copa Libertadores	Group 5	Venezuela	C.D. Portugués	2–0	0–1	4th place	Eliminated
1968	Copa Libertadores	Group 5	Brazil	Náutico	2–1	0–1	4th place	Eliminated
1968	Copa Libertadores	Group 5	Brazil	Palmeiras	1–2	0–2	4th place	Eliminated
1970	Copa Libertadores	Group 2	Venezuela	Valencia	0–2	3–1	4th place	Eliminated
1970	Copa Libertadores	Group 2	Uruguay	Peñarol	0–1	1–4	4th place	Eliminated
1970	Copa Libertadores	Group 2	Uruguay	Nacional	0–4	0–2	4th place	Eliminated
1971	Copa Libertadores	Group 3	Venezuela	Deportivo Italia	3–3	2–3	4th place	Eliminated
1971	Copa Libertadores	Group 3	Brazil	Palmeiras	2–3	0–3	4th place	Eliminated
1971	Copa Libertadores	Group 3	Brazil	Fluminense	1–3	1–4	4th place	Eliminated
1975	Copa Libertadores	Group 4	Venezuela	Portuguesa	0–0	1–1	3rd place	Eliminated
1975	Copa Libertadores	Group 4	Ecuador	L.D.U. Quito	2–4	0–1	3rd place	Eliminated
1975	Copa Libertadores	Group 4	Ecuador	Nacional	4–0	0–0	3rd place	Eliminated
1976	Copa Libertadores	Group 1	Venezuela	Portuguesa	1–2	1–3	4th place	Eliminated
1976	Copa Libertadores	Group 1	Argentina	River Plate	0–1	1–4	4th place	Eliminated
1976	Copa Libertadores	Group 1	Argentina	Estudiantes	0–1	1–3	4th place	Eliminated
1979	Copa Libertadores	Group 4	Venezuela	Portuguesa	1–1	1–1	4th place	Eliminated
1979	Copa Libertadores	Group 4	Chile	Palestino	1–1	0–5	4th place	Eliminated
1979	Copa Libertadores	Group 4	Chile	O'Higgins	0–1	0–6	4th place	Eliminated
1980	Copa Libertadores	Group 3	Venezuela	Táchira	1–0	1–0	3rd place	Eliminated
1980	Copa Libertadores	Group 3	Brazil	Internacional	2–1	0–2	3rd place	Eliminated
1980	Copa Libertadores	Group 3	Brazil	Vasco da Gama	0–0	0–4	3rd place	Eliminated

== Footnotes ==
A. Points were taken from Deportivo Galicia due to irregularities in their line-up. Peñarol was awarded the points. Peñarol advanced due to goal difference.
