= Leonardo Fabio Moreno =

Colombian footballer (born 1973)

Personal information
- Full name: Leonardo Fabio Moreno Cortés
- Date of birth: 2 November 1973 (age 52)
- Place of birth: Santiago de Cali, Colombia
- Position: Forward

Senior career*
Years	Team	Apps	(Gls)
1992–1993	América de Cali	24	(3)
1993–1994	Belgrano de Córdoba	8	(1)
1994–1995	Deportes Tolima	11	(5)
1996	Independiente Santa Fe	28	(12)
1997	Deportes Quindío	10	(8)
1997–2000	América de Cali	145	(51)
2000–2001	Club América	13	(4)
2001	Atlético Celaya	17	(9)
2001–2002	Club América	17	(2)
2002–2003	Chiapas	1	(0)
2003–2004	América de Cali	53	(28)
2004–2005	San Lorenzo	9	(1)
2005	Atlético Nacional	8	(1)
2005–2006	Lobos de la BUAP	16	(7)
2006	Club Macará	6	(0)
2007	Atlético Bucaramanga	20	(9)
2007–2008	CA Peñarol	8	(1)
2008	Deportivo Pasto	11	(2)
2008	Boyacá Chico	13	(4)
Total		418	(148)

International career
1997–2000	Colombia	2	(0)
- * Club domestic league appearances and goals

Leonardo Fabio Moreno (born November 2, 1973) is a Colombian former football forward.

== Titles ==
Season	Club	Title
1992	América de Cali	Categoría Primera A
1996-97	América de Cali	Categoría Primera A
