= Copa Mercosur =

- Logos in both Spanish (above) and Portuguese (below)
- Organizer(s): CONMEBOL
- Founded: 1998
- Abolished: 2001; 25 years ago
- Region: South America
- Teams: 20
- Related competitions: Copa Merconorte
- Most championships: (Brazil) Palmeiras (Brazil) Flamengo (Brazil) Vasco (Argentina) San Lorenzo (1 title each)
- Broadcaster: PSN

The Copa Mercosur (Spanish pronunciation: [ˈkopa meɾkoˈsuɾ], Portuguese: Copa Mercosul [ˈkɔpɐ meʁkoˈsuw], "Mercosur Cup") was a football competition played from 1998 to 2001 by the traditional top clubs from Brazil, Argentina, Paraguay, Uruguay and Chile.

The competition was created by CONMEBOL to generate TV money to the participating teams, but it went beyond and ended up, together with the Copa Merconorte, as natural replacements to the Supercopa Libertadores.

Three of the four editions were won by Brazilian clubs, and one by an Argentine club. No team won two editions of this tournament, and therefore Palmeiras, Flamengo, Vasco da Gama (all three from Brazil), and San Lorenzo (from Argentina) ended up as the biggest winners of the competition with one title each.

Both the Copa Merconorte and the Copa Mercosur were discontinued after the 2001 edition. A football competition to be called the Copa Pan-Americana would have replaced these two competitions for the 2002 season featuring clubs from both CONMEBOL and CONCACAF. That competition was first postponed, with plans to be played in 2003, then eventually cancelled. The Copa Pan-Americana would ultimately not come to fruition and that left the Copa Sudamericana as the successor of the Copa Merconorte and the Copa Mercosur. Instead, a CONMEBOL competition called the Copa Sudamericana was created and had its first edition in 2002, and that competition is still played to this day.

== Format ==
Twenty teams played in the tournament. Their participation was based on invitation and not sporting merit. The teams were divided in five groups of four teams each and the matches were played in two legs. The group winners and the best three runners-up qualified for the quarterfinals. The quarterfinals, the semifinals were played in two legs. In 1998 and 2000 the finals were played in three legs. In 1999 and 2001 the finals were played in two legs.

== Records and statistics ==
=== List of finals ===
Keys

- aet: after extra time
- p: defined on penalty shoot-out
- Match decided by a penalty shootout after extra time
- Match playoff after the series ended tied on aggregate
- Defined on penalty shoot-out in the second leg

Ed.	Year	Winners	1st. leg	2nd. leg	Agg.	Runners-up	Venue (1st leg)	City (1st leg)	Venue (2nd leg)	City (2nd leg)	Venue (Playoff)	City (Playoff)
1	1998	(Brazil) Palmeiras	1–2	3–1	1–0	(Brazil) Cruzeiro	Mineirão	Belo Horizonte	Palestra Itália	São Paulo	Palestra Itália	São Paulo
2	1999	(Brazil) Flamengo	4–3	3–3	–	(Brazil) Palmeiras	Maracanã	Rio de Janeiro	Palestra Itália	São Paulo	–	–
3	2000	(Brazil) Vasco da Gama	2–0	0–1	4–3	(Brazil) Palmeiras	São Januário	Rio de Janeiro	Palestra Itália	São Paulo	Palestra Itália	São Paulo
4	2001	(Argentina) San Lorenzo	0–0	1–1	4–3 (p)	(Brazil) Flamengo	Maracanã	Rio de Janeiro	Pedro Bidegain	Buenos Aires	–	–

== Performances by club ==
The trophy which was awarded to the champions of the competition

Performance in the Copa Mercosur by club
Club	Titles	Runners-up	Seasons won	Seasons runner-up
(Brazil) Palmeiras	1	2	1998	1999, 2000
(Brazil) Flamengo	1	1	1999	2001
(Argentina) San Lorenzo	1	0	2001	—
(Brazil) Vasco da Gama	1	0	2000	—
(Brazil) Cruzeiro	0	1	—	1998

=== Performances by nation ===
Nation	Winner	Runners-Up	Winning Clubs	Runners-Up
Brazil	3	4	Flamengo (1); Palmeiras (1); Vasco da Gama (1)	Palmeiras (2); Flamengo (1); Cruzeiro (1)
Argentina	1	0	San Lorenzo (1)	—

=== Participants (1998–2001) ===
- (Argentina) Boca Juniors
- (Argentina) San Lorenzo
- (Argentina) Independiente
- (Argentina) Racing
- (Argentina) River Plate
- (Argentina) Vélez Sarsfield
- (Argentina) Rosario Central
- (Argentina) Talleres de Córdoba
- (Brazil) Cruzeiro
- (Brazil) Flamengo
- (Brazil) Grêmio
- (Brazil) Corinthians
- (Brazil) São Paulo
- (Brazil) Vasco da Gama
- (Brazil) Atlético Mineiro
- (Brazil) Palmeiras
- (Chile) Colo-Colo
- (Chile) Universidad Católica
- Universidad de Chile
- (Paraguay) Olimpia
- (Paraguay) Cerro Porteño
- (Uruguay) Nacional
- (Uruguay) Peñarol

=== Berths per season (1998–2001) ===
- Brazil: 7
- Argentina: 6
- Chile: 3
- Paraguay: 2
- Uruguay: 2

== Top scorers ==
Year	Player (team)	Goals
1998	(Brazil) Alex (Palmeiras) (Brazil) Fábio Júnior (Cruzeiro)	6
1999	(Brazil) Romário (Flamengo)	8
2000	(Brazil) Romário (Vasco da Gama)	11
2001	(Argentina) Bernardo Romeo (San Lorenzo)	10

== See also ==
- Torneio Mercosul
- Copa Merconorte
- Supercopa Libertadores
- Copa CONMEBOL
