= Torneio Mercosul =

- Organiser(s): Centertur and Estratégia B. Cecrisa
- Founded: 1995
- Abolished: 1996
- Region: Brazil
- Teams: 10 (1995), 3 (1996)
- Most championships: Figueirense; Internacional; 1 title each

Torneio Mercosul (English: Mercosur Tournament, Spanish: Torneo Mercosur) was an international football friendly competition played in 1995 and 1996. The 1995 edition was played in Santa Catarina state, Brazil.

The competition was considered at the time, by Santa Catarina press, as an embryo of Copa Mercosur. It was intended to have a second edition of Torneio Mercosul in 1996, but it never happened. The budget of the competition was US$ 400,000.00. CONMEBOL did not recognize this competition.

== 1995 ==
=== Invited teams ===
| Club | Country |
|---|---|
| Avaí | Brazil |
| Barcelona | Ecuador |
| C.A. Cerro | Uruguay |
| Coritiba | Brazil |
| Criciúma | Brazil |
| Estudiantes | Argentina |
| Figueirense | Brazil |
| Grêmio | Brazil |
| Internacional | Brazil |
| Joinville | Brazil |
| Juventude | Brazil |
| Marcílio Dias | Brazil |
| Nacional | Uruguay |
| Olimpia | Paraguay |
| Peñarol | Uruguay |
| Racing | Argentina |

Barcelona, Estudiantes, Grêmio, Internacional, Juventude, Peñarol and Racing declined the invitation to play in the competition.

=== Organizers of the competition ===
The organizers of the competition were Centertur and Estratégia B. Cecrisa, Construtora Caseca, Petrobras, and Sadia were the companies that supported the competition.

=== Format ===
The first round was played in four playoff matches. Marcílio Dias got a bye in this round. In the second round, Marcílio Dias played against one of the first round qualified teams for a semifinal spot. The next round was the semifinal round, followed by the final.

=== Results ===
==== First round ====
| Home team | Score | Away team |
|---|---|---|
| Figueirense | 2-2 (aet 1-0) | Olimpia |
| Joinville | 3-0 | Coritiba |
| Avaí | 4-2 | Nacional |
| Criciúma | 2-0 | C.A. Cerro |
| Marcílio Dias | bye | - |

==== Intermediate round ====
| Home team | Score | Away team |
|---|---|---|
| Marcílio Dias | 1-0 | Criciúma |

==== Semifinals ====
| Home team | Score | Away team |
|---|---|---|
| Joinville | 1-0 | Avaí |
| Figueirense | 1-0 | Marcílio Dias |

==== Final ====
| Home team | Score | Away team |
|---|---|---|
| Figueirense | 0-0 (aet 1-0) | Joinville |

Torneio Mercosul
1995 Winners
Figueirense
First Title

=== Statistics ===
| Number of matches | 8 |
| Total goals | 20 |
| Average Goals per match | 2.5 per match |
| Highest scoring match (6 goals) | Avaí-Nacional 4-2 |
| Highest score (3 goals) | Joinville-Coritiba 3-0 |
| Biggest attendance | Figueirense-Joinville 0-0 (aet 1-0) (5,271 people) |
| Biggest revenue | Figueirense-Joinville 0-0 (aet 1-0) (R$ 48,469.00) |
| Club with biggest revenue | Figueirense (R$ 89,110.00) |

=== Overview ===
The tournament was considered a failure. One of the reasons was that Centertur used a rubber check to pay the accommodations of Olimpia at Hotel Mariner Plaza in Itajaí. Also, many traditional teams declined to play the tournament, exhausting the competition before it started. The tournament was discontinued and three years later, the Copa Mercosur's first edition was played.

== 1996 ==
There was also an empty edition of the competition, with just three teams in 1996.

=== Invited teams ===
| Club | Country |
|---|---|
| Internacional | Brazil |
| San Lorenzo | Argentina |
| Universidad Católica | Chile |

=== Final standings ===
| Team | Pts | P | W | D | L | GF | GA | GD |
|---|---|---|---|---|---|---|---|---|
| (Brazil) Internacional | 12 | 4 | 4 | 0 | 0 | 10 | 1 | +9 |
| (Chile) Universidad Católica | 3 | 3 | 1 | 0 | 2 | 3 | 6 | -3 |
| (Argentina) San Lorenzo | 0 | 3 | 0 | 0 | 3 | 0 | 6 | -6 |

Torneio Mercosul
1996 Winners
Internacional
First Title

== See also ==
- Copa Mercosur
