= Copa Merconorte =

- Organizer(s): CONMEBOL
- Founded: 1998
- Abolished: 2001; 25 years ago
- Region: South America; North America
- Teams: 16
- Related competitions: Copa Mercosur
- Most championships: (Colombia) Atl. Nacional (2 titles)

The Copa Merconorte (Spanish pronunciation: [ˈkopa meɾkoˈnoɾte]) was an international football competition organized by CONMEBOL from 1998 to 2001 by clubs from Bolivia, Colombia, Ecuador, Peru, and Venezuela and starting in 2000 clubs from the CONCACAF confederation were invited including Costa Rica, Mexico, and the United States. The competition ran alongside the Copa Mercosur, which was based on the actual Mercosur economic bloc of Argentina, Brazil, Paraguay and Uruguay, but Copa Mercosur also included clubs from Chile.

Teams did not directly qualify for this competition. Instead, the aim was to generate profits through the television contracts by inviting the most marketable clubs from each country. Therefore, participation was based on invitation of individual clubs.

All four editions were won by Colombian clubs. Atlético Nacional won it on two occasions (1998 and 2000). All the finalists in the first three editions were Colombian. In the fourth edition, Emelec became the first and only non-Colombian club to reach the finals of the Copa Merconorte.

Both the Copa Merconorte and the Copa Mercosur were discontinued after the 2001 edition. A football competition to be called the Copa Pan-Americana would have replaced these two competitions for the 2002 season featuring clubs from both CONMEBOL and CONCACAF. That competition was first postponed, with plans to be played in 2003, then eventually cancelled. The Copa Pan-Americana would ultimately not come to fruition and that left the Copa Sudamericana as the successor of the Copa Merconorte and the Copa Mercosur. Instead, a CONMEBOL competition called the Copa Sudamericana was created and had its first edition in 2002, and that competition is still played to this day.

== Format ==
=== Qualification ===
Teams did not directly qualify for this competition through their national leagues. Participation was based solely on invitation.

=== Tournament ===
The 1998 and 1999 editions were played with twelve teams of the five corresponding CONMEBOL nations. The twelve teams were divided into three groups and each team meets the others in its group home and away in a round-robin format. The group winners and the best runner-up advanced to a semifinal stage. The semifinals were played over two legs and the winners advanced to the finals which were also played over two legs. In 1999, the Bolivian teams played a qualifying playoff before the first phase of Copa Merconorte.

The 2000 and 2001 editions were expanded to sixteen teams and divided into four groups. With the expansion of another group, only the group winners advanced to the semifinals.

=== Distribution ===
The invitations and distribution of berths over the four seasons were as follows.

Association	1998	1999	2000	2001
Bolivia	The Strongest	The Strongest	Oriente Petrolero	Blooming
Colombia	América de Cali; Atlético Nacional; Deportivo Cali; Millonarios	América de Cali; Atlético Nacional; Millonarios; Santa Fe	América de Cali; Atlético Nacional; Millonarios	América de Cali; Atlético Nacional; Millonarios
Ecuador	Barcelona; El Nacional; Emelec	Barcelona; El Nacional; Emelec	Barcelona; El Nacional; Emelec	Aucas; Barcelona; Emelec
Peru	Alianza Lima; Sporting Cristal; Universitario	Alianza Lima; Sporting Cristal; Universitario	Alianza Lima; Sporting Cristal; Universitario	Alianza Lima; Sporting Cristal; Universitario
Venezuela	Caracas	Caracas	Estudiantes de Mérida	Deportivo Italchacao
Costa Rica	No invitations	No invitations	Alajuelense	No invitations
Mexico	No invitations	No invitations	Guadalajara; Necaxa; Pachuca; Toluca	Guadalajara; Necaxa; Santos Laguna
United States	No invitations	No invitations	No invitations	Kansas City Wizards; NY/NJ MetroStars

== Records and statistics ==
=== List of finals ===
Keys

- aet: after extra time
- p: defined on penalty shoot-out
- Match decided by a penalty shootout after extra time
- Match playoff after the series ended tied on aggregate
- Defined on penalty shoot-out in the second leg

Ed.	Year	Winners	1st. leg	2nd. leg	Playoff/ Agg.	Runners-up	Venue (1st leg)	City (1st leg)	Venue (2nd leg)	City (2nd leg)	
Ed.	1	1998	(Colombia) Atlético Nacional	3–1	1–0	–	(Colombia) Deportivo Cali	Atanasio Girardot	Medellín	Pascual Guerrero	Cali
2	1999	(Colombia) América de Cali	1–2	1–0	5–3 (p)	(Colombia) Santa Fe	Pascual Guerrero	Cali	Nemesio Camacho	Bogotá	
3	2000	(Colombia) Atlético Nacional	0–0	2–1	–	(Colombia) Millonarios	Nemesio Camacho	Bogotá	Atanasio Girardot	Medellín	
4	2001	(Colombia) Millonarios	1–1	1–1	3–1 (p)	(Ecuador) Emelec	Nemesio Camacho	Bogotá	George Capwell	Guayaquil	

== Performances by club ==
Performance in the Copa Merconorte by club
Club	Titles	Runners-up	Seasons won	Seasons runner-up
(Colombia) Atlético Nacional	2	0	1998, 2000	—
(Colombia) Millonarios	1	1	2001	2000
(Colombia) América de Cali	1	0	1999	—
(Colombia) Deportivo Cali	0	1	—	1998
(Ecuador) Emelec	0	1	—	2001
(Colombia) Santa Fe	0	1	—	1999

=== Performances by nation ===
Nation	Winner	Runner-up	Total
Colombia	4	3	7
Ecuador	0	1	1

=== Participants (1998–2001) ===
- (Colombia) Atlético Nacional
- (Colombia) América de Cali
- (Colombia) Deportivo Cali
- (Colombia) Independiente Santa Fe
- (Colombia) Millonarios
- (Peru) Alianza Lima
- (Peru) Sporting Cristal
- (Peru) Club Universitario de Deportes
- (Ecuador) Barcelona S.C.
- (Ecuador) El Nacional
- (Ecuador) Club Sport Emelec
- (Bolivia) The Strongest
- (Bolivia) Club Blooming
- (Bolivia) Oriente Petrolero
- (Venezuela) Caracas F.C.
- (Venezuela) Deportivo Italchacao
- (Venezuela) Estudiantes de Mérida
- (Costa Rica) Alajuelense
- (Mexico) Necaxa
- (Mexico) C.D. Guadalajara
- (Mexico) C.F. Pachuca
- (Mexico) Toluca FC
- (United States) Kansas City Wizards
- (United States) MetroStars

=== Berths per season (1998–2001) ===
- Colombia: 4
- Mexico: 4
- Ecuador: 3
- Peru: 3
- United States: 2
- Bolivia: 1
- Venezuela: 1
- Costa Rica: 1

== See also ==
- Copa Mercosur
- Supercopa Libertadores
- Copa Sudamericana
- Copa CONMEBOL
