= 1990 Copa Libertadores finals =

- Event: 1990 Copa Libertadores
Olimpia	Barcelona
(Paraguay)	(Ecuador)
3	1
- on aggregate

First leg
Olimpia	Barcelona
2	0
- Date: 3 October 1990
- Venue: Defensores del Chaco, Asunción
- Referee: Juan Cardellino (Uruguay)
- Attendance: 35,000

Second leg
Barcelona	Olimpia
1	1
- Date: 10 October 1990
- Venue: Estadio Monumental, Guayaquil
- Referee: Juan Carlos Loustau (Argentina)
- Attendance: 55,000

The 1990 Copa Libertadores finals was the two-legged final to decide the winners of the 1990 Copa Libertadores, the 31st edition of the Copa Libertadores, South America's premier international club football tournament organised by CONMEBOL.

The finals were contested in two-legged home-and-away format between Paraguayan club Olimpia and Ecuadorian club Barcelona. The first leg was hosted by Olimpia at the Estadio Defensores del Chaco in Asunción, Paraguay on 3 October 1990, while the second leg was hosted by Barcelona at the Estadio Monumental in Guayaquil, Ecuador on 10 October 1990.

Olimpia won the final 3–1 on aggregate for their second Copa Libertadores title. As winners, they earned the right to play against the winners of the 1989–90 European Cup, Italian club Milan, in the 1990 Intercontinental Cup in Tokyo, Japan. They also had earned the right to play against the winners of the 1990 Supercopa Libertadores in the 1991 Recopa Sudamericana. However, as Olimpia also went on to win the Supercopa Libertadores, they were automatically awarded the Recopa Sudamericana title. Olimpia also automatically qualified for the knockout stage of the 1991 Copa Libertadores.

== Format ==
The final was planned to be played on a home-and-away two-legged basis. The team that accumulated the most points – two for a win, one for a draw, zero for a loss – after the two legs was crowned champion. If the two teams had tied on points after the second leg, extra time would not be played, and a penalty shoot-out would be used to determine the winner.

== Qualified teams ==
Team	Previous finals app.
(Paraguay) Olimpia	3 (1960, **1979**, 1989)
(Ecuador) Barcelona	None

- **Bold** indicates winning years

== Venues ==
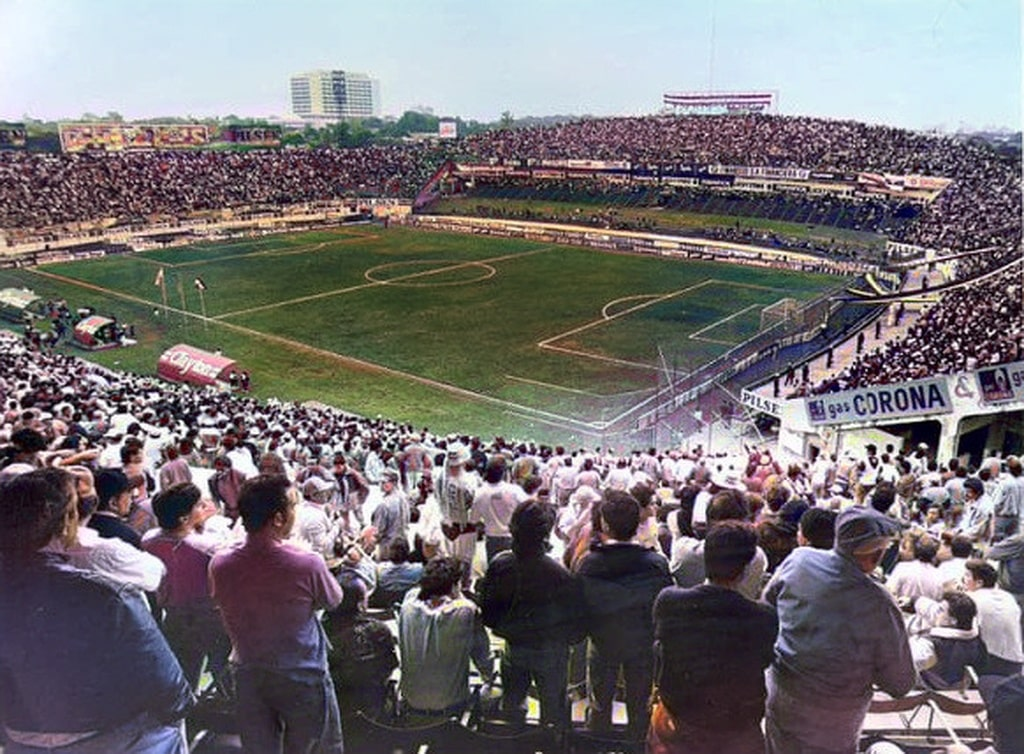
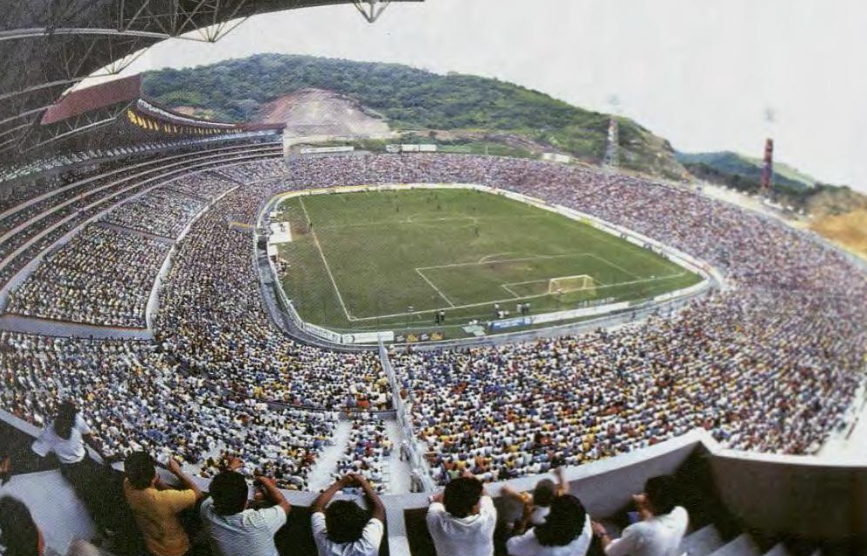
Estadio Defensores del Chaco (left) and Estadio Monumental, venues for the series

== Match details ==
1990 Copa Libertadores finals

=== First leg ===
October 3, 1990
21:10 (UTC-3)
First leg

Olimpia (Paraguay)	2–0	(Ecuador) Barcelona
Amarilla 46'; Samaniego 70'	Report

Estadio Defensores del Chaco, Asunción
Attendance: 35,000
Referee: Juan Cardellino (Uruguay)

**Olimpia**	**Barcelona**

GK	1	(Uruguay) (Paraguay) Ever Almeida
DF	13	(Paraguay) Juan Z. Ramírez
DF	5	(Paraguay) Remigio Fernández
DF	2	(Paraguay) Mario C. Ramírez
DF	4	(Paraguay) Silvio Suárez
MF	6	(Paraguay) Fermín Balbuena	(substituted off) 46'
MF	16	(Paraguay) Jorge Guasch (c)
MF	10	(Paraguay) Luis Monzón
FW	11	(Paraguay) Gabriel González
MF	9	(Paraguay) Adriano Samaniego
FW	24	(Paraguay) Raúl Amarilla
Substitutes:
MF		(Paraguay) Cristóbal Cubilla	(substituted on) 46'
Manager:
(Uruguay) Luis Cubilla

GK	1	(Ecuador) Carlos Luis Morales
DF	2	(Ecuador) Jimmy Izquierdo
DF	13	(Ecuador) Freddy Bravo
DF	4	(Ecuador) Wilson Macías (c)
MF	6	(Ecuador) Julio C. Guzmán
MF	8	(Uruguay) Mario Saralegui
MF	17	(Ecuador) Jhonny Proaño	(substituted off) 78'
MF	10	(Argentina) Marcelo Trobbiani
MF	7	(Ecuador) Carlos Muñoz	(substituted off) 46'
FW	21	(Ecuador) Jimmy A. Jiménez
FW	11	(Uruguay) Luis A. Acosta
Substitutes:
DF		(Ecuador) Carlos Hans	(substituted on) 46'
MF	18	(Ecuador) David Bravo	(substituted on) 78'
Manager:
(Argentina) Miguel Ángel Brindisi

=== Second leg ===
October 10, 1990
Second leg

Barcelona (Ecuador)	1–1	(Paraguay) Olimpia
Trobbiani 61'	Report	Amarilla 80'

Estadio Monumental, Guayaquil
Attendance: 55,000
Referee: Juan Carlos Loustau (Argentina)

**Barcelona**	**Olimpia**

GK	1	(Ecuador) Carlos Luis Morales
DF	2	(Ecuador) Jimmy Izquierdo
DF	13	(Ecuador) Freddy Bravo
DF	4	(Ecuador) Wilson Macías (c)
MF	6	(Ecuador) Julio C. Guzmán	(substituted off) 46'
MF	8	(Uruguay) Mario Saralegui
MF	18	(Ecuador) David Bravo
MF	10	(Argentina) Marcelo Trobbiani
FW	7	(Ecuador) Carlos Muñoz
FW	9	(Ecuador) Manuel Uquillas
FW	11	(Uruguay) Luis A. Acosta
Substitutes:
DF		(Ecuador) Jhonny Proaño	(substituted on) 46'
Manager:
(Argentina) Miguel Ángel Brindisi

GK	1	(Uruguay) (Paraguay) Ever Almeida
DF	13	(Paraguay) Juan Z. Ramírez
DF	5	(Paraguay) Remigio Fernández
DF	2	(Paraguay) Mario C. Ramírez
DF	4	(Paraguay) Silvio Suárez
MF	6	(Paraguay) Fermín Balbuena
MF	8	(Paraguay) Adolfo Jara	(substituted off) 70'
MF	16	(Paraguay) Jorge Guasch (c)
MF	10	(Paraguay) Luis Monzón
MF	9	(Paraguay) Adriano Samaniego
FW	24	(Paraguay) Raúl Amarilla	(substituted off) 84'
Substitutes:
MF		(Paraguay) Gabriel González	(substituted on) 70'
MF		(Paraguay) Vidal Sanabria	(substituted on) 84'
Manager:
(Uruguay) Luis Cubilla

== See also ==
- 1991 Recopa Sudamericana
