= 1990 Supercopa Libertadores finals =

1990 Supercopa Libertadores Finals
- Event: 1990 Supercopa Libertadores
Nacional	Olimpia
(Uruguay)	(Paraguay)
3	6
- (on aggregate)

First leg
Nacional	Olimpia
0	3
- Date: January 5, 1991
- Venue: Estadio Centenario, Montevideo
- Referee: José R. Wright (Brazil)

Second leg
Olimpia	Nacional
3	3
- Date: January 11, 1991
- Venue: Defensores del Chaco, Asunción
- Referee: Juan C. Loustau (Argentina)

The 1990 Supercopa Libertadores Finals was a two-legged football series to determine the winner of the 1990 Supercopa Libertadores, played in January 1991. The finals were contested by Paraguayan Club Olimpia and Uruguayan Club Nacional de Football.

In the first leg, held in Estadio Centenario in Montevideo, Olimpia easily defeated Nacional 3–0. The second leg was held in Estadio Defensores del Chaco in Asunción, where both teams tied 3–3. Therefore, Olimpia won the series 3–1 on points (6–3 on aggregate), achieving their first Supercopa Libertadores trophy.

== Qualified teams ==
Team	Previous finals app.
(Paraguay) Olimpia	None
(Argentina) Nacional	None

== Venues ==
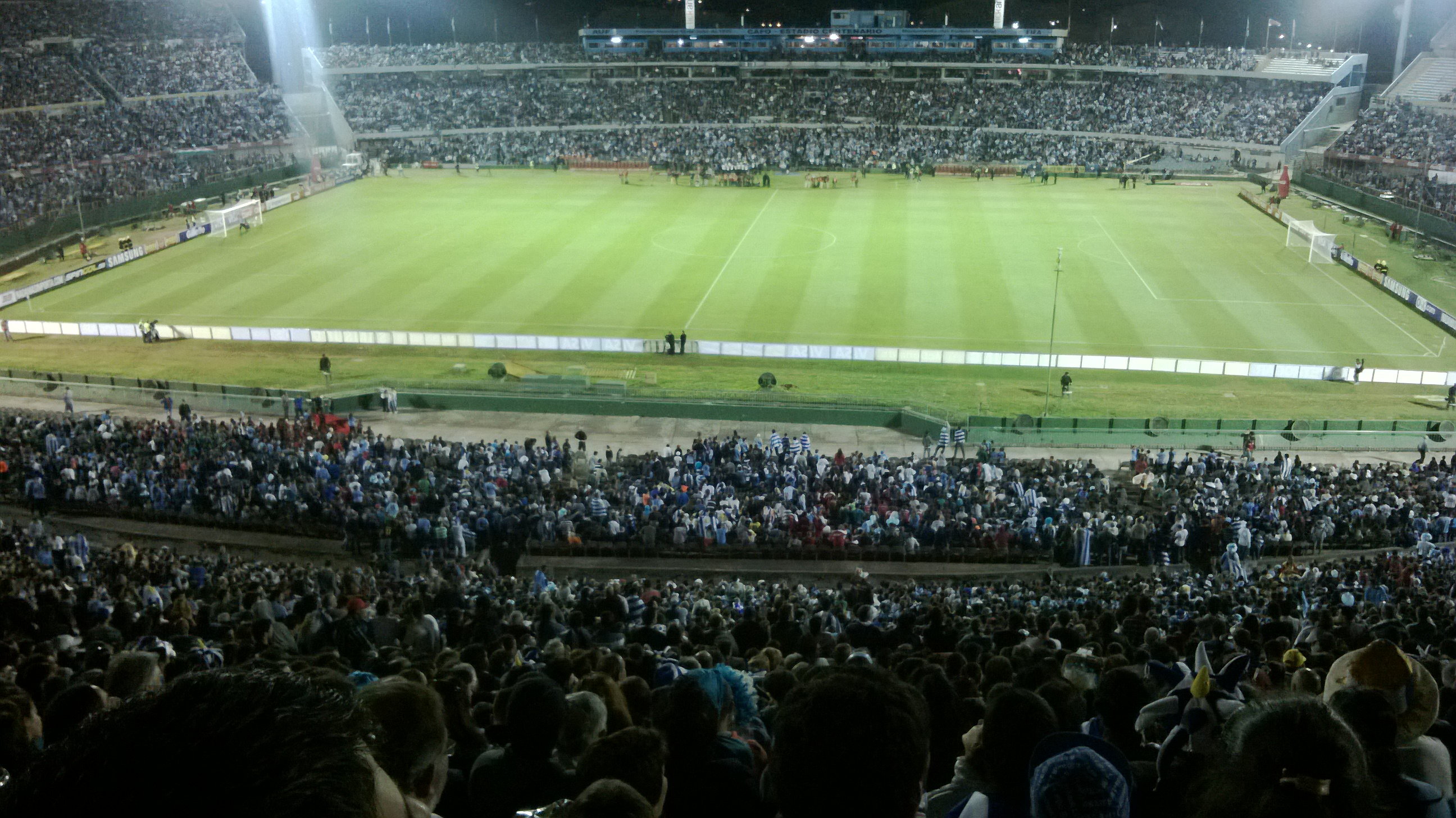
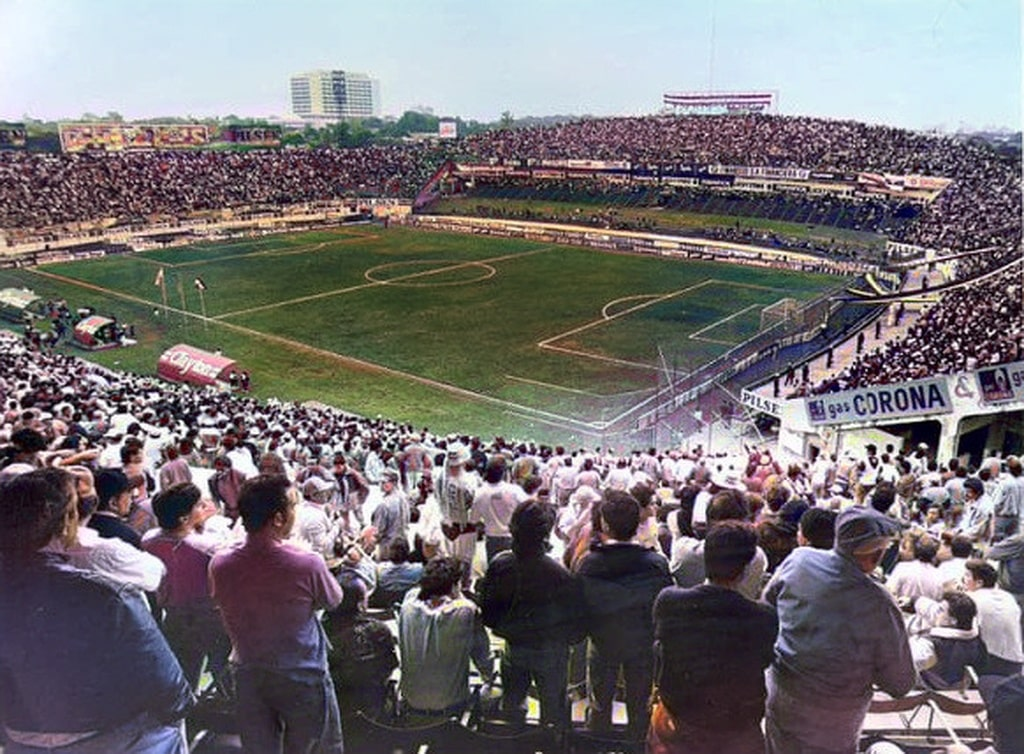
Estadio Centenario (left) and Estadio Defensores del Chaco, venues for the series

== Route to the final ==
Note: In all scores below, the score of the home team is given first.

(Paraguay) Olimpia			Round	(Uruguay) Nacional		
Opponent	Venue	Score		Opponent	Venue	Score
(Argentina) River Plate (tied 3–3 on aggregate, won on penalties)	Away	3–0	First round	(Argentina) Independiente (won 3–2 on aggregate)	Away	1–1
(Argentina) River Plate (tied 3–3 on aggregate, won on penalties)	Home	3–0 (4–3 p)	First round	(Argentina) Independiente (won 3–2 on aggregate)	Home	2–1
(Argentina) Racing (won 4–1 on aggregate)	Home	1–1	Quarter-finals	(Argentina) Argentinos Juniors (won 4–3 on aggregate)	Away	2–1
(Argentina) Racing (won 4–1 on aggregate)	Away	0–3	Quarter-finals	(Argentina) Argentinos Juniors (won 4–3 on aggregate)	Home	3–1
(Uruguay) Peñarol (won 7–2 on aggregate)	Away	2–1	Semi-finals	(Argentina) Estudiantes (tied 0–0 on aggregate, won on penalties)	Away	0–0
(Uruguay) Peñarol (won 7–2 on aggregate)	Home	6–0	Semi-finals	(Argentina) Estudiantes (tied 0–0 on aggregate, won on penalties)	Home	0–0 (5–3 p)

== Match details ==
=== First leg ===
1990 Supercopa Libertadores Finals
January 5, 1991
First leg

Nacional (Uruguay)	0–3	(Paraguay) Olimpia
		González 16'; Amarilla 37'; Samaniego 79'

Estadio Centenario, Montevideo
Referee: José R. Wright (Brazil)

Nacional
Olimpia

=== Second leg ===
January 11, 1991
Second leg

Olimpia (Paraguay)	3–3	(Uruguay) Nacional
Samaniego 26'; Amarilla 49'; Monzón 69'		Cardaccio 4'; Morán 31'; Núñez 79'

Estadio Defensores del Chaco, Asunción
Referee: Juan Carlos Loustau (Argentina)

Olimpia
Nacional

GK	1	(Uruguay) Ever Almeida
DF		(Paraguay) Virginio Cáceres
DF		(Paraguay) Juan Z. Ramírez
DF		(Paraguay) Remigio Fernández (c)
DF		(Paraguay) Silvio Suárez
MF		(Paraguay) Fermín Balbuena
MF		(Paraguay) Jorge Guasch
MF	10	(Paraguay) Luis Monzón
MF		(Paraguay) Gabriel González	(substituted off) a'
FW	9	(Paraguay) Raúl Amarilla
FW		(Paraguay) Adriano Samaniego
Substitutions:
FW	21	(Paraguay) Jorge Villalba	(substituted on) a'
Manager:
(Uruguay) Luis Cubilla

GK	1	(Uruguay) Jorge Seré
DF		(Uruguay) Sergio Maristán
DF		(Uruguay) Enrique Saravia
DF		(Uruguay) Felipe Revelez (c)
DF		(Uruguay) Gustavo Mozzo
MF		(Uruguay) José E. Peña
MF		(Uruguay) Jorge Cardaccio
MF		(Uruguay) Héctor Morán
MF		(Uruguay) Gerardo Miranda	(substituted off) a'
FW		(Uruguay) Wilson Núñez
FW		(Uruguay) José García	(substituted off) b'
Substitutions:
FW		(Uruguay) Wilmar Cabrera	(substituted on) a'
FW		(Uruguay) Venancio Ramos	(substituted on) b'
Manager:
(Uruguay) Juan Carlos Blanco
