= 1990 Intercontinental Cup =

Football match

Milan	Olimpia
(Italy)	(Paraguay)
3	0
- Date: 9 December 1990
- Venue: National Stadium, Tokyo
- Man of the Match: Frank Rijkaard (Milan)
- Referee: José Roberto Wright (Brazil)
- Attendance: 60,228

The 1990 Intercontinental Cup was an association football match played on 9 December 1990 between Milan of Italy, winners of the 1989–90 European Cup, and Olimpia of Paraguay, winners of the 1990 Copa Libertadores. The match was played at the neutral venue of the National Stadium in Tokyo in front of 60,228 fans. Frank Rijkaard was named as man of the match.

== Match details ==
1990 Intercontinental Cup
9 December 1990
12:00 JST

Milan (Italy)	3–0	(Paraguay) Olimpia
Rijkaard 43', 65'; Stroppa 62'	Report

National Stadium, Tokyo
Attendance: 60,228
Referee: José Roberto Wright (Brazil)

Milan	Olimpia

GK	1	(Italy) Andrea Pazzagli
RB	2	(Italy) Mauro Tassotti
CB	6	(Italy) Franco Baresi (C)
CB	5	(Italy) Alessandro Costacurta
LB	3	(Italy) Paolo Maldini	(substituted off) 25'
CM	4	(Italy) Angelo Carbone
CM	8	(Netherlands) Frank Rijkaard
RM	7	(Italy) Roberto Donadoni	(substituted off) 82'
LM	11	(Italy) Giovanni Stroppa
CF	9	(Netherlands) Marco van Basten
AM	10	(Netherlands) Ruud Gullit
Substitutes:
GK	12	(Italy) Sebastiano Rossi
DF	13	(Italy) Filippo Galli	(substituted on) 25'
MF	14	(Italy) Gianluca Gaudenzi	(substituted on) 82'
DF	15	(Italy) Stefano Nava
FW	16	(Italy) Daniele Massaro
Manager:
(Italy) Arrigo Sacchi

GK	1	(Paraguay) Ever Almeida
DF	2	(Paraguay) Virginio Cáceres
DF	3	(Paraguay) Mario Ramírez		(substituted off) 49'
DF	4	(Paraguay) Silvio Suárez
DF	5	(Paraguay) Remigio Fernández	(yellow card) 25'
MF	8	(Paraguay) Fermín Balbuena
MF	7	(Paraguay) Adolfo Jara		(substituted off) 67'
MF	6	(Paraguay) Jorge Guasch (C)
MF	10	(Paraguay) Luis Monzón
FW	9	(Spain) Raúl Amarilla
FW	11	(Paraguay) Adriano Samaniego
Substitutes:
GK	12	(Paraguay) Julián Coronel
MF	13	(Paraguay) Vidal Sanabria
DF	14	(Paraguay) Herib Chamas		(substituted on) 49'
FW	15	(Paraguay) Nery Franco
FW	16	(Paraguay) Cristóbal Cubilla		(substituted on) 67'
Manager:
(Uruguay) Luis Cubilla

Assistant referees:
Chen Shengcai (China)
Shizuo Takada (Japan)

== See also ==
- 1989–90 European Cup
- 1990 Copa Libertadores
- A.C. Milan in European football
