= 1991 Copa Libertadores finals =

- Event: 1991 Copa Libertadores
Olimpia	Colo-Colo
(Paraguay)	(Chile)
0	3

First leg
Olimpia	Colo-Colo
0	0
- Date: 29 May 1991
- Venue: Estadio Defensores del Chaco, Asunción
- Referee: Ernesto Filippi
- Attendance: 51.000

Second leg
Colo-Colo	Olimpia
3	0
- Date: 5 June 1991
- Venue: Estadio Monumental David Arellano, Santiago
- Referee: José Roberto Wright
- Attendance: 66.517

The 1991 Copa Libertadores final was a two-legged football match-up to determine the 1991 Copa Libertadores champion. It was contested between Olimpia of Paraguay and Club Social y Deportivo Colo-Colo of Chile.

Colo-Colo won 3–0 on aggregate score and became the first Chilean football team to win an official international competition. These finals were the last ones not to show either an Argentine nor a Brazilian team competed up to the 2016 edition.

== Qualified teams ==
Team	Previous finals app.
(Paraguay) Olimpia	1960, **1979**, 1989, **1990**
(Chile) Colo-Colo	1973

Bold indicates winning years

== Venues ==
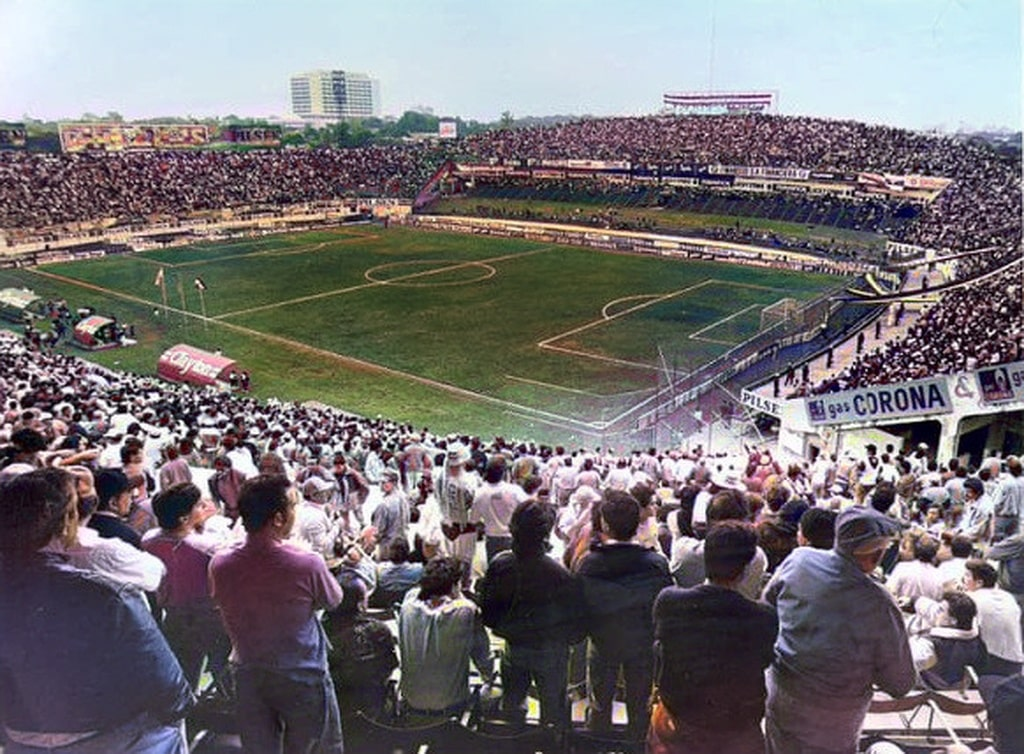
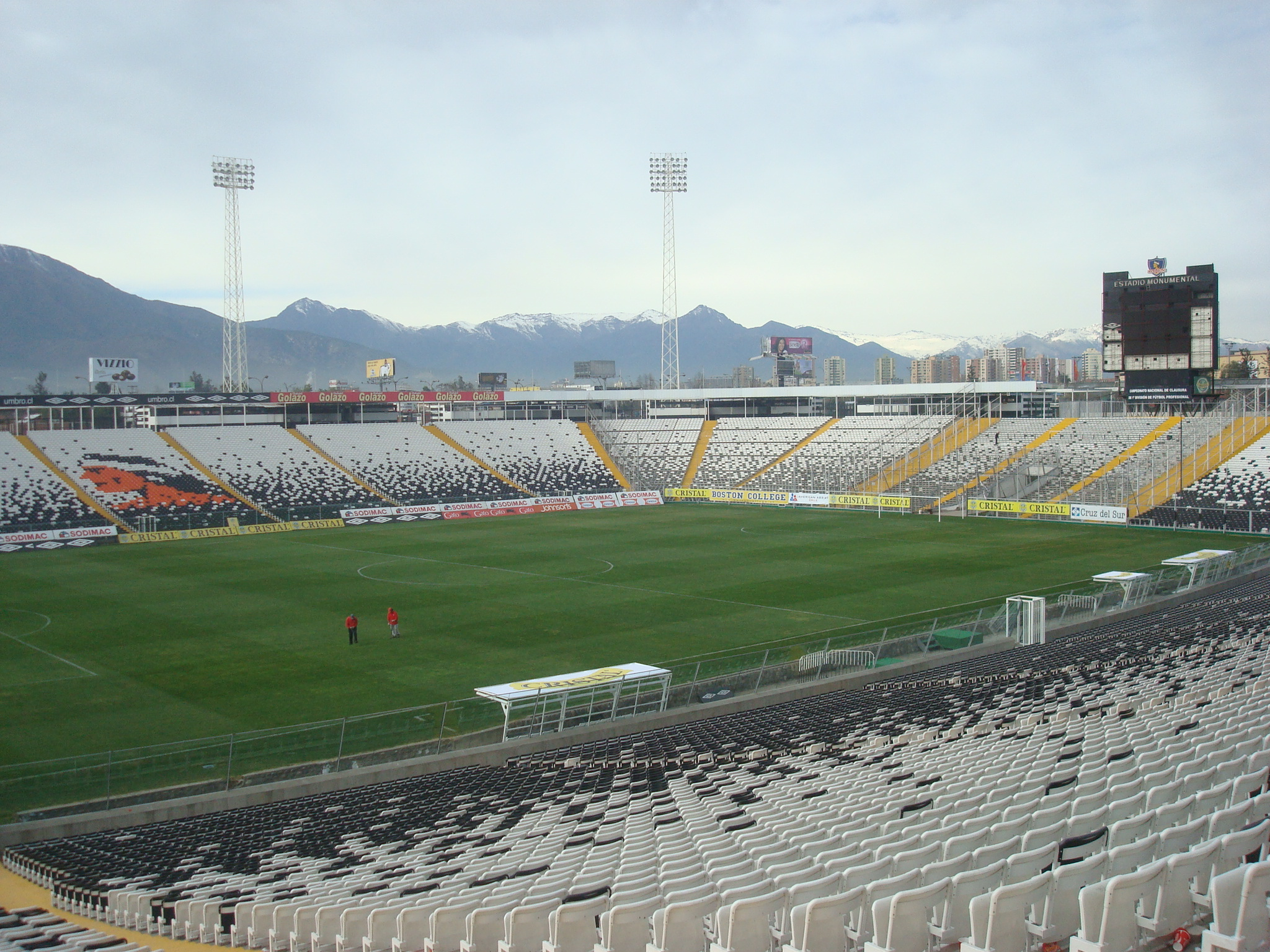
Estadio Defensores del Chaco (left) and Estadio Monumental, venues for the series

== Match details ==
=== First leg ===
22 May 1991
First leg

Olimpia (Paraguay)	0–0	(Chile) Colo-Colo

Estadio Defensores del Chaco, Asunción
Attendance: 48.000
Referee: Ernesto Filippi (Uruguay)

**Olimpia**	**Colo-Colo**

GK	12	(Paraguay) Jorge Battaglia
DF	2	(Paraguay) Virginio Cáceres	(red card) 80'
DF	5	(Paraguay) Remigio Fernández
DF	13	(Paraguay) César Castro
DF	4	(Paraguay) Silvio Suárez
MF	8	(Paraguay) Fermín Balbuena
MF	6	(Paraguay) Jorge Guasch (c)
MF	10	(Paraguay) Luis Monzón
MF	17	(Paraguay) Carlos Guirland		(substituted off) 62'
FW	9	(Paraguay) Adriano Samaniego		(substituted off) 62'
FW	7	(Paraguay) Gabriel González
Substitutes:
FW	15	(Paraguay) Cristóbal Cubilla		(substituted on) 62'
FW	20	(Paraguay) Jorge Villalba		(substituted on) 62'
Manager:
(Uruguay) Luis Cubilla

GK	1	(Argentina) Daniel Morón
DF	3	(Chile) Lizardo Garrido
DF	6	(Chile) Miguel Ramírez
DF	4	(Chile) Javier Margas
DF	5	(Chile) Eduardo Vilches
MF	2	(Chile) Rubén Espinoza
MF	15	(Chile) Gabriel Mendoza
MF	13	(Chile) Juan Carlos Peralta
MF	10	(Chile) Jaime Pizarro (c)
FW	7	(Argentina) Marcelo Barticciotto
FW	11	(Chile) Rubén Martínez	(red card) 80'
Substitutes:
Manager:
(Socialist Federal Republic of Yugoslavia) Mirko Jozić

=== Second leg ===
5 June 1991
Second leg

Colo-Colo (Chile)	3–0	(Paraguay) Olimpia
Pérez 12', 17'; Herrera 85'

Estadio Monumental, Santiago
Attendance: 66,517
Referee: Jose Wright (Brazil)

**Colo-Colo**	**Olimpia**

GK	1	(Argentina) Daniel Morón
DF	3	(Chile) Lizardo Garrido
DF	6	(Chile) Miguel Ramírez
DF	4	(Chile) Javier Margas	Booked
DF	5	(Chile) Eduardo Vilches
MF	2	(Chile) Rubén Espinoza
MF	15	(Chile) Gabriel Mendoza		(yellow card) (substituted off) 40'
MF	13	(Chile) Juan Carlos Peralta
MF	10	(Chile) Jaime Pizarro (c)
FW	19	(Chile) Luis Pérez
FW	7	(Argentina) Marcelo Barticciotto
Substitutes:
FW	21	(Chile) Leonel Herrera		(substituted on) 40'
Manager:
(Socialist Federal Republic of Yugoslavia) Mirko Jozić

GK	12	(Paraguay) Jorge Battaglia
DF	22	(Paraguay) Mario Ramírez
DF	5	(Paraguay) Remigio Fernández	Booked
DF	13	(Paraguay) César Castro
DF	4	(Paraguay) Silvio Suárez
MF	8	(Paraguay) Fermín Balbuena	(yellow card) (substituted off) 76'
MF	6	(Paraguay) Jorge Guasch (c)
MF	10	(Paraguay) Luis Monzón
MF	16	(Paraguay) Adolfo Jara		(substituted off) 61'
FW	19	(Paraguay) Félix Torres
FW	7	(Paraguay) Gabriel González	(yellow card) 30' (yellow-red card)
Substitutes:
FW	17	(Paraguay) Carlos Guirland		(substituted on) 61'
FW	15	(Paraguay) Cristóbal Cubilla		(substituted on) 76'
Manager:
(Uruguay) Luis Cubilla

Assistant referees:
(Brazil) Wilson dos Santos
(Brazil) José Da Costa
Fourth official:
(Chile) Iván Guerrero
