= List of Copa Libertadores finals =

Copa Libertadores
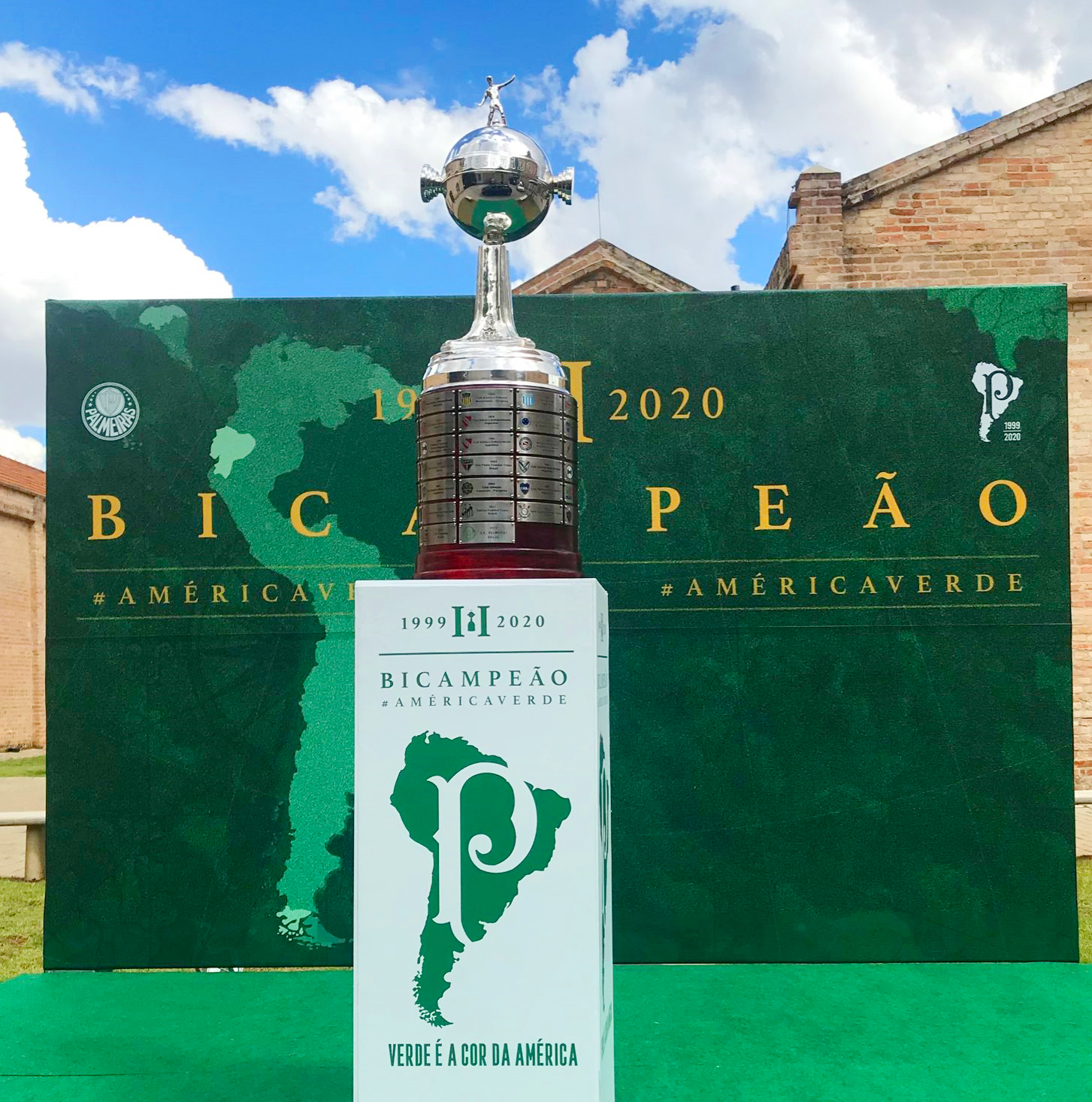
- The Copa Libertadores trophy won by Brazilian club Palmeiras in 2020
- Organiser(s): CONMEBOL
- Founded: 1960
- Region: South America
- Teams: 47 (first round); 2 (finalists)
- Qualifier for: FIFA Club World Cup; FIFA Intercontinental Cup; Recopa Sudamericana
- Current champions: (Brazil) Flamengo (4th title)
- Most championships: (Argentina) Independiente (7 titles)
- 2026 Copa Libertadores final

The Copa Libertadores is a seasonal association football competition that was established in 1960. It begins in mid-January and ends with the final in November of the same year. The Copa Libertadores is open to the league champions of CONMEBOL member associations; clubs finishing from second to fourth position in the stronger leagues of the region, such as the Brazilian league, are also included. Originally, only the champions of their respective national league could participate in the competition. However, in 1966 this was changed to allow the runners-up of the leagues to compete. Until 2018, the final was contested over two legs, one at each participating club's stadium. From 2019, the format was changed, with the final being a single game played at a predetermined venue.

The data below does not include the 1948 South American Championship of Champions, as it is not listed by CONMEBOL either as a Libertadores edition or an official competition. It must be pointed out, however, that at least in the years 1996 and 1997, CONMEBOL entitled equal status to both the Copa Libertadores and the 1948 tournament, in that the 1948 champions (Vasco da Gama) were allowed to participate in the Supercopa Libertadores, a CONMEBOL official competition that allowed participation for former Libertadores champions only (for example, not admitting participation for champions of other CONMEBOL official competitions, such as the Copa CONMEBOL). The 1948 competition is referred to by CONMEBOL as the one that, twelve years later, would become the Copa Libertadores.

Independiente hold the record for the most victories, with seven wins since the competition's inception. They have also won the competition the most times consecutively, winning four in a row from 1972 to 1975. Boca Juniors are second with six wins; they won their last title in 2007. Peñarol are third with five wins, the most recent being in 1987. Boca Juniors have also lost the most finals, finishing as runners-up on six occasions. Overall, 27 clubs have won the competition since its inception in 1960. Clubs from Argentina and Brazil have won 25 Copas Libertadores titles each among them; Uruguayan clubs are third with eight titles. Since the inception of the tournament, two finals have been derbies: an Argentine one (Superclásico in 2018 - the only time, as of 2025, both finalists represented the same country other than Brazil) and a Brazilian one (Clássico da Saudade in 2020). As of 2025, there have been seven all-Brazilian Copa Libertadores finals, including three back-to-back from 2020 to 2022. Brazilian clubs currently hold a record-breaking title streak (seven in a row, starting in 2019).

== List of finals ==
Key
‡	Finals decided in a playoff
*	Finals decided by a penalty shoot-out
†	Match decided after extra time

- The "Year" column refers to the season the competition was held, and wikilinks to the article about that season.
- Finals are listed in the order they were played.

List of Copa Libertadores finals
Year	Country	Winner	Score	Runner-up	Country	Venue	Attendance
1960	Uruguay	Peñarol	1–0	Olimpia	Paraguay	(Uruguay) Estadio Centenario, Montevideo	44,690
1960	Uruguay	Peñarol	1–1	Olimpia	Paraguay	(Paraguay) Estadio de Puerto Sajonia, Asunción	35,000
1961	Uruguay	Peñarol	1–0	Palmeiras	Brazil	(Uruguay) Estadio Centenario, Montevideo	64,376
1961	Uruguay	Peñarol	1–1	Palmeiras	Brazil	(Brazil) Estádio do Pacaembu, São Paulo	50,000
1962	Brazil	Santos	2–1	Peñarol	Uruguay	(Uruguay) Estadio Centenario, Montevideo	48,105
1962	Brazil	Santos	2–3	Peñarol	Uruguay	(Brazil) Vila Belmiro, Santos	18,000
1962	Brazil	Santos	3–0^{‡}	Peñarol	Uruguay	(Argentina) Estadio Monumental, Buenos Aires	60,000
1963	Brazil	Santos	3–2	Boca Juniors	Argentina	(Brazil) Maracanã, Rio de Janeiro	100,000
1963	Brazil	Santos	2–1	Boca Juniors	Argentina	(Argentina) La Bombonera, Buenos Aires	50,000
1964	Argentina	Independiente	0–0	Nacional	Uruguay	(Uruguay) Estadio Centenario, Montevideo	60,000
1964	Argentina	Independiente	1–0	Nacional	Uruguay	(Argentina) La Doble Visera, Avellaneda	80,000
1965	Argentina	Independiente	1–0	Peñarol	Uruguay	(Argentina) La Doble Visera, Avellaneda	45,000
1965	Argentina	Independiente	1–3	Peñarol	Uruguay	(Uruguay) Estadio Centenario, Montevideo	45,000
1965	Argentina	Independiente	4–1^{‡}	Peñarol	Uruguay	(Chile) Estadio Nacional, Santiago	40,000
1966	Uruguay	Peñarol	2–0	River Plate	Argentina	(Uruguay) Estadio Centenario, Montevideo	46,041
1966	Uruguay	Peñarol	2–3	River Plate	Argentina	(Argentina) Estadio Monumental, Buenos Aires	100,000
1966	Uruguay	Peñarol	4–2^{‡†}	River Plate	Argentina	(Chile) Estadio Nacional, Santiago	40,240
1967	Argentina	Racing	0–0	Nacional	Uruguay	(Argentina) El Cilindro, Avellaneda	99,148
1967	Argentina	Racing	0–0	Nacional	Uruguay	(Uruguay) Estadio Centenario, Montevideo	60,000
1967	Argentina	Racing	2–1^{‡}	Nacional	Uruguay	(Chile) Estadio Nacional, Santiago	50,000
1968	Argentina	Estudiantes	2–1	Palmeiras	Brazil	(Argentina) Estadio Jorge Luis Hirschi, La Plata	35,000
1968	Argentina	Estudiantes	1–3	Palmeiras	Brazil	(Brazil) Estádio do Pacaembu, São Paulo	40,000
1968	Argentina	Estudiantes	2–0^{‡}	Palmeiras	Brazil	(Uruguay) Estadio Centenario, Montevideo	55,000
1969	Argentina	Estudiantes	1–0	Nacional	Uruguay	(Uruguay) Estadio Centenario, Montevideo	65,000
1969	Argentina	Estudiantes	2–0	Nacional	Uruguay	(Argentina) Estadio Jorge Luis Hirschi, La Plata	55,000
1970	Argentina	Estudiantes	1–0	Peñarol	Uruguay	(Argentina) Estadio Jorge Luis Hirschi, La Plata	40,000
1970	Argentina	Estudiantes	0–0	Peñarol	Uruguay	(Uruguay) Estadio Centenario, Montevideo	60,000
1971	Uruguay	Nacional	0–1	Estudiantes	Argentina	(Argentina) Estadio Jorge Luis Hirschi, La Plata	30,000
1971	Uruguay	Nacional	1–0	Estudiantes	Argentina	(Uruguay) Estadio Centenario, Montevideo	70,000
1971	Uruguay	Nacional	2–0^{‡}	Estudiantes	Argentina	(Peru) Estadio Nacional, Lima	—
1972	Argentina	Independiente	0–0	Universitario	Peru	(Peru) Estadio Nacional, Lima	45,000
1972	Argentina	Independiente	2–1	Universitario	Peru	(Argentina) La Doble Visera, Avellaneda	55,000
1973	Argentina	Independiente	1–1	Colo-Colo	Chile	(Argentina) La Doble Visera, Avellaneda	40,000
1973	Argentina	Independiente	0–0	Colo-Colo	Chile	(Chile) Estadio Nacional, Santiago	80,000
1973	Argentina	Independiente	2–1^{‡†}	Colo-Colo	Chile	(Uruguay) Estadio Centenario, Montevideo	—
1974	Argentina	Independiente	1–2	São Paulo	Brazil	(Brazil) Estádio do Pacaembu, São Paulo	50,000
1974	Argentina	Independiente	2–0	São Paulo	Brazil	(Argentina) La Doble Visera, Avellaneda	55,000
1974	Argentina	Independiente	1–0^{‡}	São Paulo	Brazil	(Chile) Estadio Nacional, Santiago	60,000
1975	Argentina	Independiente	0–1	Unión Española	Chile	(Chile) Estadio Nacional, Santiago	43,200
1975	Argentina	Independiente	3–1	Unión Española	Chile	(Argentina) La Doble Visera, Avellaneda	60,000
1975	Argentina	Independiente	2–0^{‡}	Unión Española	Chile	(Paraguay) Estadio Defensores del Chaco, Asunción	—
1976	Brazil	Cruzeiro	4–1	River Plate	Argentina	(Brazil) Mineirão, Belo Horizonte	58,720
1976	Brazil	Cruzeiro	1–2	River Plate	Argentina	(Argentina) Estadio Monumental, Buenos Aires	90,000
1976	Brazil	Cruzeiro	3–2^{‡}	River Plate	Argentina	(Chile) Estadio Nacional, Santiago	40,000
1977	Argentina	Boca Juniors	1–0	Cruzeiro	Brazil	(Argentina) Estadio Boca Juniors, Buenos Aires	60,000
1977	Argentina	Boca Juniors	0–1	Cruzeiro	Brazil	(Brazil) Mineirão, Belo Horizonte	80,000
1977	Argentina	Boca Juniors	0–0^{‡}* (Note: Score was 0–0 after 90 minutes. Boca Juniors won the penalty shoot-out 5–4.)	Cruzeiro	Brazil	(Uruguay) Estadio Centenario, Montevideo	60,000
1978	Argentina	Boca Juniors	0–0	Deportivo Cali	Colombia	(Colombia) Estadio Olímpico Pascual Guerrero, Cali	50,000
1978	Argentina	Boca Juniors	4–0	Deportivo Cali	Colombia	(Argentina) Estadio Boca Juniors, Buenos Aires	80,000
1979	Paraguay	Olimpia	2–0	Boca Juniors	Argentina	(Paraguay) Estadio Defensores del Chaco, Asunción	50,000
1979	Paraguay	Olimpia	0–0	Boca Juniors	Argentina	(Argentina) Estadio Boca Juniors, Buenos Aires	65,000
1980	Uruguay	Nacional	0–0	Internacional	Brazil	(Brazil) Estádio Beira-Rio, Porto Alegre	70,000
1980	Uruguay	Nacional	1–0	Internacional	Brazil	(Uruguay) Estadio Centenario, Montevideo	65,000
1981	Brazil	Flamengo	2–1	Cobreloa	Chile	(Brazil) Maracanã, Rio de Janeiro	93,985
1981	Brazil	Flamengo	0–1	Cobreloa	Chile	(Chile) Estadio Nacional, Santiago	61,721
1981	Brazil	Flamengo	2–0^{‡}	Cobreloa	Chile	(Uruguay) Estadio Centenario, Montevideo	30,200
1982	Uruguay	Peñarol	0–0	Cobreloa	Chile	(Uruguay) Estadio Centenario, Montevideo	55,248
1982	Uruguay	Peñarol	1–0	Cobreloa	Chile	(Chile) Estadio Nacional, Santiago	70,400
1983	Brazil	Grêmio	1–1	Peñarol	Uruguay	(Uruguay) Estadio Centenario, Montevideo	70,000
1983	Brazil	Grêmio	2–1	Peñarol	Uruguay	(Brazil) Estádio Olímpico Monumental, Porto Alegre	80,000
1984	Argentina	Independiente	1–0	Grêmio	Brazil	(Brazil) Estádio Olímpico Monumental, Porto Alegre	—
1984	Argentina	Independiente	0–0	Grêmio	Brazil	(Argentina) La Doble Visera, Avellaneda	—
1985	Argentina	Argentinos Juniors	1–0	América de Cali	Colombia	(Argentina) Estadio Monumental, Buenos Aires	—
1985	Argentina	Argentinos Juniors	0–1	América de Cali	Colombia	(Colombia) Estadio Olímpico Pascual Guerrero, Cali	35,350
1985	Argentina	Argentinos Juniors	1–1^{‡}* (Note: Score was 1–1 after 90 minutes. Argentinos Juniors won the penalty shoot-out 5–4.)	América de Cali	Colombia	(Paraguay) Estadio Defensores del Chaco, Asunción	—
1986	Argentina	River Plate	2–1	América de Cali	Colombia	(Colombia) Estadio Olímpico Pascual Guerrero, Cali	50,000
1986	Argentina	River Plate	1–0	América de Cali	Colombia	(Argentina) Estadio Antonio V. Liberti, Buenos Aires	74,300
1987	Uruguay	Peñarol	0–2	América de Cali	Colombia	(Colombia) Estadio Olímpico Pascual Guerrero, Cali	65,000
1987	Uruguay	Peñarol	2–1	América de Cali	Colombia	(Uruguay) Estadio Centenario, Montevideo	60,000
1987	Uruguay	Peñarol	1–0^{‡†}	América de Cali	Colombia	(Chile) Estadio Nacional, Santiago	25,000
1988	Uruguay	Nacional	0–1	Newell's Old Boys	Argentina	(Argentina) Gigante de Arroyito, Rosario	45,000
1988	Uruguay	Nacional	3–0	Newell's Old Boys	Argentina	(Uruguay) Estadio Centenario, Montevideo	75,000
1989	Colombia	Atlético Nacional	0–2	Olimpia	Paraguay	(Paraguay) Estadio Defensores del Chaco, Asunción	—
1989	Colombia	Atlético Nacional	2–0* (Note: Score was 2–2 on aggregate after 90 minutes. Atlético Nacional won the penalty shoot-out 5–4.)	Olimpia	Paraguay	(Colombia) Estadio El Campín, Bogotá	—
1990	Paraguay	Olimpia	2–0	Barcelona	Ecuador	(Paraguay) Estadio Defensores del Chaco, Asunción	—
1990	Paraguay	Olimpia	1–1	Barcelona	Ecuador	(Ecuador) Estadio Monumental de Barcelona, Guayaquil	—
1991	Chile	Colo-Colo	0–0	Olimpia	Paraguay	(Paraguay) Estadio Defensores del Chaco, Asunción	48,000
1991	Chile	Colo-Colo	3–0	Olimpia	Paraguay	(Chile) Estadio Monumental David Arellano, Santiago	66,517
1992	Brazil	São Paulo	0–1	Newell's Old Boys	Argentina	(Argentina) El Coloso del Parque, Rosario	35,000
1992	Brazil	São Paulo	1–0* (Note: Score was 1–1 on aggregate after 90 minutes. São Paulo won the penalty shoot-out 3–2.)	Newell's Old Boys	Argentina	(Brazil) Estádio do Morumbi, São Paulo	105,185
1993	Brazil	São Paulo	5–1	Universidad Católica	Chile	(Brazil) Estádio do Morumbi, São Paulo	99,000
1993	Brazil	São Paulo	0–2	Universidad Católica	Chile	(Chile) Estadio Nacional, Santiago	50,000
1994	Argentina	Vélez Sársfield	1–0	São Paulo	Brazil	(Argentina) José Amalfitani Stadium, Buenos Aires	35,000
1994	Argentina	Vélez Sársfield	0–1* (Note: Score was 1–1 on aggregate after 90 minutes. Vélez Sársfield won the penalty shoot-out 5–3.)	São Paulo	Brazil	(Brazil) Estádio do Morumbi, São Paulo	90,000
1995	Brazil	Grêmio	3–1	Atlético Nacional	Colombia	(Brazil) Estádio Olímpico Monumental, Porto Alegre	—
1995	Brazil	Grêmio	1–1	Atlético Nacional	Colombia	(Colombia) Estadio Atanasio Girardot, Medellín	—
1996	Argentina	River Plate	0–1	América de Cali	Colombia	(Colombia) Estadio Olímpico Pascual Guerrero, Cali	—
1996	Argentina	River Plate	2–0	América de Cali	Colombia	(Argentina) Estadio Antonio V. Liberti, Buenos Aires	—
1997	Brazil	Cruzeiro	0–0	Sporting Cristal	Peru	(Peru) Estadio Nacional, Lima	45,000
1997	Brazil	Cruzeiro	1–0	Sporting Cristal	Peru	(Brazil) Mineirão, Belo Horizonte	95,472
1998	Brazil	Vasco da Gama	2–0	Barcelona	Ecuador	(Brazil) Estádio São Januário, Rio de Janeiro	35,000
1998	Brazil	Vasco da Gama	2–1	Barcelona	Ecuador	(Ecuador) Estadio Monumental Isidro Romero Carbo, Guayaquil	72,000
1999	Brazil	Palmeiras	0–1	Deportivo Cali	Colombia	(Colombia) Estadio Olímpico Pascual Guerrero, Cali	46,000
1999	Brazil	Palmeiras	2–1* (Note: Score was 2–2 on aggregate after 90 minutes. Palmeiras won the penalty shoot-out 4–3.)	Deportivo Cali	Colombia	(Brazil) Estádio Palestra Itália, São Paulo	32,000
2000	Argentina	Boca Juniors	2–2	Palmeiras	Brazil	(Argentina) Estadio Camilo Cichero, Buenos Aires	50,580
2000	Argentina	Boca Juniors	0–0* (Note: Score was 2–2 on aggregate after 90 minutes. Boca Juniors won the penalty shoot-out 4–2.)	Palmeiras	Brazil	(Brazil) Estádio do Morumbi, São Paulo	75,000
2001	Argentina	Boca Juniors	1–0	Cruz Azul	Mexico	Estadio Azteca, Mexico City	115,000
2001	Argentina	Boca Juniors	0–1* (Note: Score was 1–1 on aggregate after 90 minutes. Boca Juniors won the penalty shoot-out 3–1.)	Cruz Azul	Mexico	(Argentina) Estadio Alberto J. Armando, Buenos Aires	60,000
2002	Paraguay	Olimpia	0–1	São Caetano	Brazil	(Paraguay) Estadio Defensores del Chaco, Asunción	40,000
2002	Paraguay	Olimpia	2–1* (Note: Score was 2–2 on aggregate after 90 minutes. Olimpia won the penalty shoot-out 4–2.)	São Caetano	Brazil	(Brazil) Estádio do Pacaembu, São Paulo	55,000
2003	Argentina	Boca Juniors	2–0	Santos	Brazil	(Argentina) Estadio Alberto J. Armando, Buenos Aires	57,000
2003	Argentina	Boca Juniors	3–1	Santos	Brazil	(Brazil) Estádio do Morumbi, São Paulo	75,000
2004	Colombia	Once Caldas	0–0	Boca Juniors	Argentina	(Argentina) Estadio Alberto J. Armando, Buenos Aires	57,000
2004	Colombia	Once Caldas	1–1* (Note: Score was 1–1 on aggregate after 90 minutes. Once Caldas won the penalty shoot-out 2–0.)	Boca Juniors	Argentina	(Colombia) Estadio Palogrande, Manizales	—
2005	Brazil	São Paulo	1–1	Atlético Paranaense	Brazil	(Brazil) Estádio Beira-Rio, Porto Alegre	35,000
2005	Brazil	São Paulo	4–0	Atlético Paranaense	Brazil	(Brazil) Estádio do Morumbi, São Paulo	80,000
2006	Brazil	Internacional	2–1	São Paulo	Brazil	(Brazil) Estádio do Morumbi, São Paulo	71,745
2006	Brazil	Internacional	2–2	São Paulo	Brazil	(Brazil) Estádio Beira-Rio, Porto Alegre	55,000
2007	Argentina	Boca Juniors	3–0	Grêmio	Brazil	(Argentina) Estadio Alberto J. Armando, Buenos Aires	39,993
2007	Argentina	Boca Juniors	2–0	Grêmio	Brazil	(Brazil) Estádio Olímpico Monumental, Porto Alegre	55,000
2008	Ecuador	LDU Quito	4–2	Fluminense	Brazil	(Ecuador) Estadio Casa Blanca, Quito	45,000
2008	Ecuador	LDU Quito	1–3* (Note: Score was 5–5 on aggregate after 120 minutes. LDU Quito won the penalty shoot-out 3–1.)	Fluminense	Brazil	(Brazil) Maracanã, Rio de Janeiro	86,027
2009	Argentina	Estudiantes	0–0	Cruzeiro	Brazil	(Argentina) Estadio Ciudad de La Plata, La Plata	52,000
2009	Argentina	Estudiantes	2–1	Cruzeiro	Brazil	(Brazil) Mineirão, Belo Horizonte	70,000
2010	Brazil	Internacional	2–1	Guadalajara	Mexico	(Mexico) Estadio Chivas, Guadalajara	49,500
2010	Brazil	Internacional	3–2	Guadalajara	Mexico	(Brazil) Estádio Beira-Rio, Porto Alegre	56,000
2011	Brazil	Santos	0–0	Peñarol	Uruguay	(Uruguay) Estadio Centenario, Montevideo	65,000
2011	Brazil	Santos	2–1	Peñarol	Uruguay	(Brazil) Estádio do Pacaembu, São Paulo	40,200
2012	Brazil	Corinthians	1–1	Boca Juniors	Argentina	(Argentina) Estadio Alberto J. Armando, Buenos Aires	51,901
2012	Brazil	Corinthians	2–0	Boca Juniors	Argentina	(Brazil) Estádio do Pacaembu, São Paulo	37,959
2013	Brazil	Atlético Mineiro	0–2	Olimpia	Paraguay	(Paraguay) Estadio Defensores del Chaco, Asunción	35,000
2013	Brazil	Atlético Mineiro	2–0* (Note: Score was 2–2 on aggregate after 120 minutes. Atlético Mineiro won the penalty shoot-out 4–3.)	Olimpia	Paraguay	(Brazil) Mineirão, Belo Horizonte	56,557
2014	Argentina	San Lorenzo	1–1	Nacional	Paraguay	(Paraguay) Estadio Defensores del Chaco, Asunción	35,000
2014	Argentina	San Lorenzo	1–0	Nacional	Paraguay	(Argentina) Estadio Pedro Bidegain, Buenos Aires	42,000
2015	Argentina	River Plate	0–0	Tigres UANL	Mexico	(Mexico) Estadio Universitario, San Nicolás de los Garza	42,000
2015	Argentina	River Plate	3–0	Tigres UANL	Mexico	(Argentina) Estadio Antonio V. Liberti, Buenos Aires	70,000
2016	Colombia	Atlético Nacional	1–1	Independiente del Valle	Ecuador	(Ecuador) Estadio Olímpico Atahualpa, Quito	38,500
2016	Colombia	Atlético Nacional	1–0	Independiente del Valle	Ecuador	(Colombia) Estadio Atanasio Girardot, Medellín	45,000
2017	Brazil	Grêmio	1–0	Lanús	Argentina	(Brazil) Arena do Grêmio, Porto Alegre	55,188
2017	Brazil	Grêmio	2–1	Lanús	Argentina	(Argentina) Estadio Ciudad de Lanús, Lanús	45,000
2018	Argentina	River Plate	2–2	Boca Juniors	Argentina	(Argentina) Estadio Alberto J. Armando, Buenos Aires	49,000
2018	Argentina	River Plate	3–1^{†}	Boca Juniors	Argentina	(Spain) Santiago Bernabéu, Madrid (Note: The match, originally scheduled to be hosted by River Plate at the Estadio Monumental Antonio Vespucio Liberti, Buenos Aires, took place in Spain at the Santiago Bernabéu, Madrid due to safety concerns.)	62,282
Single match format
2019	Brazil	Flamengo	2–1	River Plate	Argentina	(Peru) Estadio Monumental, Lima (Note: The match was originally planned to be held at the Estadio Nacional, Santiago, Chile, but was moved due to the 2019–2021 Chilean protests.)	64,000
2020	Brazil	Palmeiras	1–0	Santos	Brazil	(Brazil) Maracanã, Rio de Janeiro	5,000
2021	Brazil	Palmeiras	2–1^{†}	Flamengo	Brazil	(Uruguay) Estadio Centenario, Montevideo	55,023
2022	Brazil	Flamengo	1–0	Athletico Paranaense	Brazil	(Ecuador) Estadio Monumental Banco Pichincha, Guayaquil	42,517
2023	Brazil	Fluminense	2–1^{†}	Boca Juniors	Argentina	(Brazil) Maracanã, Rio de Janeiro	69,232
2024	Brazil	Botafogo	3–1	Atlético Mineiro	Brazil	(Argentina) Estadio Mâs Monumental, Buenos Aires	72,000
2025	Brazil	Flamengo	1–0	Palmeiras	Brazil	(Peru) Estadio Monumental, Lima	70,048
Upcoming matches
Year	Country	Team 1	Match	Team 2	Country	Venue	Attendance
2026	Brazil	Palmeiras	v	Estudiantes	Argentina	(Uruguay) Estadio Centenario, Montevideo	

== Performances ==
=== By club ===
Copa Libertadores titles by club
Club	Titles	Runners-up	Seasons won	Seasons runner-up
(Argentina) Independiente	7	0	1964, 1965, 1972, 1973, 1974, 1975, 1984	—
(Argentina) Boca Juniors	6	6	1977, 1978, 2000, 2001, 2003, 2007	1963, 1979, 2004, 2012, 2018, 2023
(Uruguay) Peñarol	5	5	1960, 1961, 1966, 1982, 1987	1962, 1965, 1970, 1983, 2011
(Argentina) River Plate	4	3	1986, 1996, 2015, 2018	1966, 1976, 2019
(Argentina) Estudiantes	4	1	1968, 1969, 1970, 2009	1971
(Brazil) Flamengo	4	1	1981, 2019, 2022, 2025	2021
(Brazil) Palmeiras	3	4	1999, 2020, 2021	1961, 1968, 2000, 2025
(Paraguay) Olimpia	3	4	1979, 1990, 2002	1960, 1989, 1991, 2013
(Uruguay) Nacional	3	3	1971, 1980, 1988	1964, 1967, 1969
(Brazil) São Paulo	3	3	1992, 1993, 2005	1974, 1994, 2006
(Brazil) Santos	3	2	1962, 1963, 2011	2003, 2020
(Brazil) Grêmio	3	2	1983, 1995, 2017	1984, 2007
(Brazil) Cruzeiro	2	2	1976, 1997	1977, 2009
(Brazil) Internacional	2	1	2006, 2010	1980
(Colombia) Atlético Nacional	2	1	1989, 2016	1995
(Chile) Colo-Colo	1	1	1991	1973
(Brazil) Atlético Mineiro	1	1	2013	2024
(Brazil) Fluminense	1	1	2023	2008
(Argentina) Racing	1	0	1967	—
(Argentina) Argentinos Juniors	1	0	1985	—
(Argentina) Vélez Sársfield	1	0	1994	—
(Brazil) Vasco da Gama	1	0	1998	—
(Colombia) Once Caldas	1	0	2004	—
(Ecuador) LDU Quito	1	0	2008	—
(Brazil) Corinthians	1	0	2012	—
(Argentina) San Lorenzo	1	0	2014	—
(Brazil) Botafogo	1	0	2024	—
(Colombia) América de Cali	0	4	—	1985, 1986, 1987, 1996
(Colombia) Deportivo Cali	0	2	—	1978, 1999
(Chile) Cobreloa	0	2	—	1981, 1982
(Argentina) Newell's Old Boys	0	2	—	1988, 1992
(Ecuador) Barcelona	0	2	—	1990, 1998
(Brazil) Athletico Paranaense	0	2	—	2005, 2022
(Peru) Universitario	0	1	—	1972
(Chile) Unión Española	0	1	—	1975
(Chile) Universidad Católica	0	1	—	1993
(Peru) Sporting Cristal	0	1	—	1997
(Mexico) Cruz Azul	0	1	—	2001
(Brazil) São Caetano	0	1	—	2002
(Mexico) Guadalajara	0	1	—	2010
(Paraguay) Nacional	0	1	—	2014
(Mexico) Tigres UANL	0	1	—	2015
(Ecuador) Independiente del Valle	0	1	—	2016
(Argentina) Lanús	0	1	—	2017

=== By nation ===
As of the 2025 final

Copa Libertadores titles by nation
Nation	Winners	Runners-up
Brazil	25	20
Argentina	25	13
Uruguay	8	8
Colombia	3	7
Paraguay	3	5
Chile	1	5
Ecuador	1	3
Mexico	0	3
Peru	0	2
Bolivia	0	0
Venezuela	0	0

== See also ==
- List of Copa Libertadores winning managers
