= 1991 Copa Interamericana =

- Event: Copa Interamericana
Puebla	Colo-Colo
(Mexico)	(Chile)
2	7
- (Colo-Colo won 4–0 on points)

First leg
Puebla	Colo-Colo
1	4
- Date: September 9, 1992
- Venue: Estadio Olímpico, Villahermosa
- Referee: Berny Ulloa (Costa Rica)
- Attendance: 8,000

Second leg
Colo-Colo	Puebla
3	1
- Date: September 23, 1992
- Venue: Estadio Monumental, Santiago
- Referee: Francisco Lamolina (Argentina)
- Attendance: 52,100

The 1991 Copa InterAmericana was the 14th. edition of the Copa Interamericana. The final was contested by Mexican Club Puebla (winner of 1991 CONCACAF Champions' Cup) and Chilean club Colo-Colo (champion of 1991 Copa Libertadores). The final was played under a two-leg format in September 1992.

The first leg was held in Estadio Olímpico in Villahermosa, where Colo-Colo easily beat Puebla 4–1. The second leg was played at Estadio Monumental David Arellano in Santiago, with another Colo-Colo win over Puebla (3–1). With two wins and a 7–2 aggregate score, the Chilean side won their first Interamericana trophy.

== Qualified teams ==
Team	Qualification	Previous app.
(Chile) Colo-Colo	1991 Copa Libertadores winner	None
(Mexico) Puebla	1991 CONCACAF Champions' Cup winner	None

== Venues ==
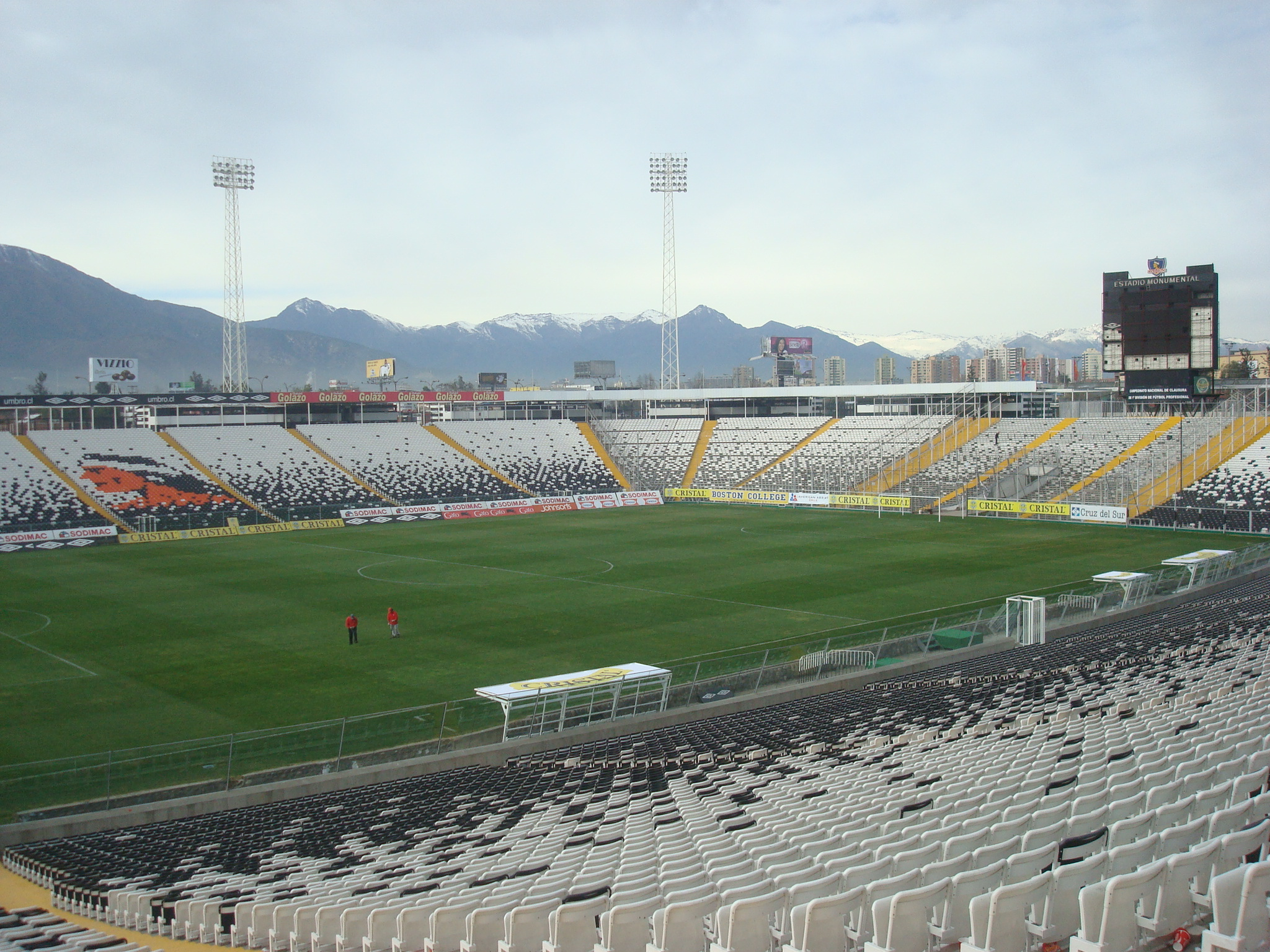
Estadio Monumental in Santiago was the venue for the second leg

== Match details ==
=== First leg ===
1991 Copa Interamericana
September 9, 1992
First leg

Puebla (Mexico)	1–4	(Chile) Colo-Colo
Olindo 76'	Report	Barticciotto 28', 61', 70'; Adomaitis 55'

Estadio Olímpico, Villahermosa
Attendance: 8,000
Referee: Berny Ulloa (Costa Rica)

GK		(Mexico) Pablo Larios
DF		(Mexico) Sigifredo Mercado
DF		(Mexico) Ángel Torres
DF		(Mexico) Aurelio Rivera
DF		(Mexico) Gerardo González
MF		(Mexico) Silmar Olindo
MF		(Mexico) Jaime Ordiales
MF		(Mexico) Silviano Delgado	(substituted off) 17'
FW		(Mexico) Jorge Rosal
FW		(Mexico) Francisco Rotllán
FW		(Mexico) Carlos Dioney
Substitutes:
MF	10	(Brazil) Milton A. Nunes	(substituted on) 17'
Manager:
(Mexico) Manuel Lapuente

GK	1	(Argentina) Daniel Morón
DF	2	(Chile) Gabriel Mendoza
DF	3	(Chile) Alejandro Hisis
DF		(Chile) Eduardo Vilches
DF		(Chile) Javier Margas
MF	11	(Argentina) Héctor Adomaitis
MF		(Chile) George Biehl
MF		(Chile) Miguel Ramírez
MF	6	(Chile) Jaime Pizarro	(substituted off) 59'
FW	7	(Argentina) Marcelo Barticciotto	(substituted off) 72'
FW	9	(Chile) Hugo Rubio
Substitutes:
DF		(Uruguay) Mario Rebollo	(substituted on) 59'
DF		(Chile) Agustín Salvatierra	(substituted on) 72'
Manager:
(Croatia) Mirko Jozic

=== Second leg ===
September 23, 1992
Second leg

Colo-Colo (Chile)	3–1	(Mexico) Puebla
Rubio 38'; Mendoza 65'; Adomaitis 74' (pen.)	Report	Rotllán 69'

Estadio Monumental, Santiago
Attendance: 52,100
Referee: Francisco Lamolina (Argentina)

Colo-Colo	Puebla

GK	1	(Argentina) Daniel Morón
DF	2	(Chile) Gabriel Mendoza
DF	3	(Chile) Alejandro Hisis
DF		(Chile) Eduardo Vilches
DF		(Chile) Javier Margas
MF	11	(Argentina) Héctor Adomaitis
MF		(Chile) Miguel Ramírez
MF	6	(Chile) Jaime Pizarro	(substituted off) 59'
FW	7	(Argentina) Marcelo Barticciotto	(substituted off) 72'
MF	8	(Argentina) Claudio Borghi	(substituted off) 67'
FW	9	(Chile) Hugo Rubio	(substituted off) 67'
Substitutes:
DF		(Chile) Lizardo Garrido	(substituted on) 67'
FW		(Chile) Aníbal González	(substituted on) 67'
Manager:
(Croatia) Mirko Jozic

GK		(Mexico) Pablo Larios
DF		(Mexico) Sigifredo Mercado
DF		(Mexico) Ángel Torres
DF		(Mexico) Aurelio Rivera
DF		(Mexico) Gerardo González
MF		(Mexico) Silmar Olindo
MF		(Mexico) Jaime Ordiales
MF		(Mexico) Silviano Delgado	(substituted off) 17'
FW		(Mexico) Jorge Rosal
FW		(Mexico) Francisco Rotllán
FW		(Mexico) Carlos Dioney
Substitutes:
MF	10	(Brazil) Milton A. Nunes	(substituted on) 17'
Manager:
(Mexico) Manuel Lapuente
