= Uniform of Colo-Colo =

The Uniform of Colo-Colo, for much of team's history its home colours have been all black and white.

== History ==
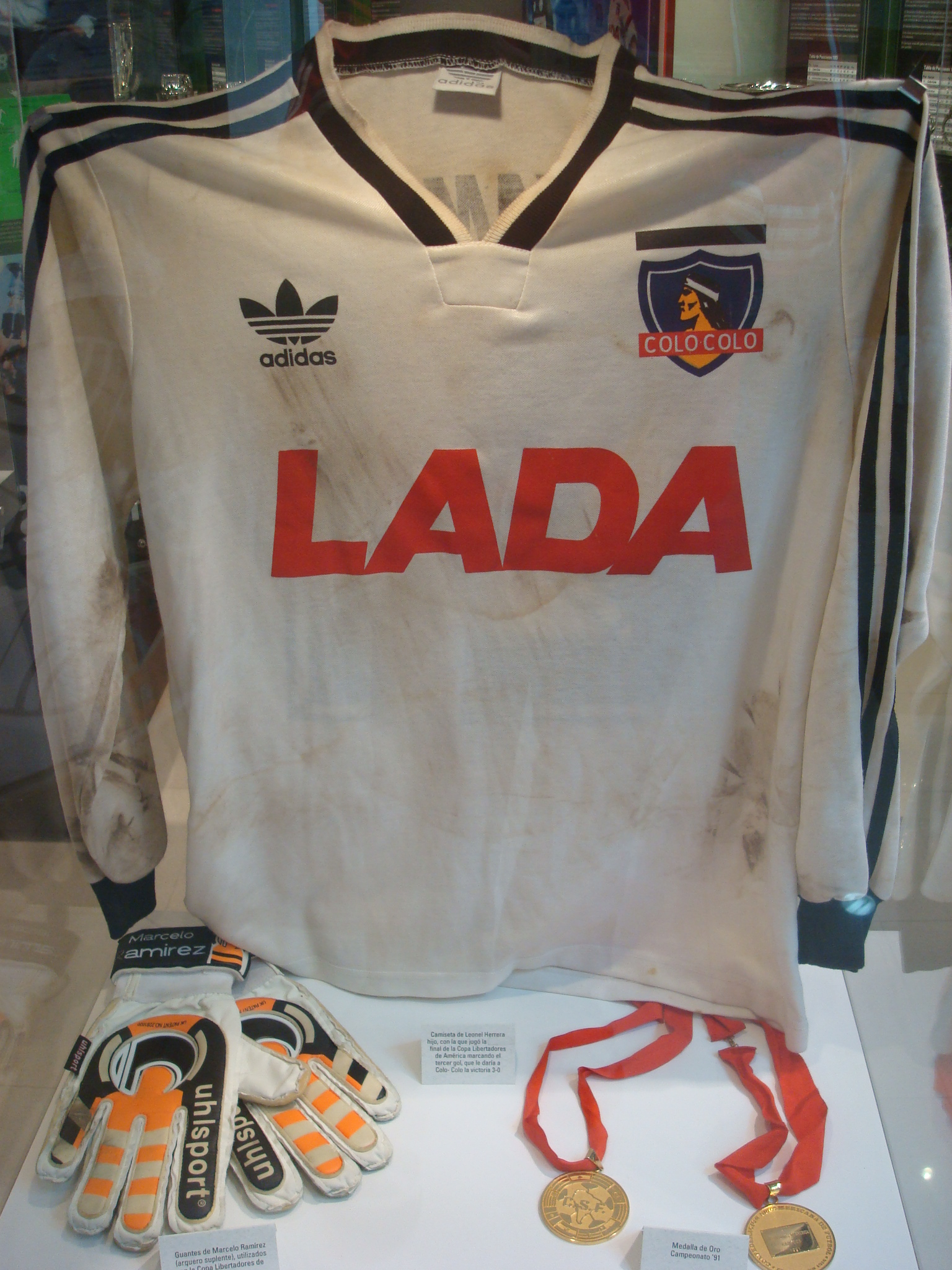
Colo-Colo's uniform at 1991 Copa Libertadores Finals.

For much of Colo-Colo's history its home colours have been all black and white. The same day of its foundation in 1925, the uniform was defined by Juan Quiñones, according to the propositions of David Arellano. After a match disputed against Spain's Real Unión Deportiva, because Arellano's tragic death during that game, the shirt of «Los Albos» wears a black horizontal band, that means the eternal mourning of the institution, for the death of its founder. Initially, was located on the shirt's left sleeve, until 1974, when was placed over the club's badge. Because of this, during the 1930s, the team wore the nickname The Mourners. In regard to the alternative kit, Colo-Colo wore several models throughout its history. The first of those, in 1927, was a green shirt and short & socks black.

1988 was the first season in which Colo-Colo wore a black shirt, white shorts and red socks. That uniform with the pass of time was entirely black, where sometimes wear white shorts and socks. However, in a 2010 Copa Libertadores game against Vélez Sarsfield at José Amalfitani Stadium, the team featured its model of 1973 that they wore against Botafogo in that Libertadores under orders of Luis Álamos as coach.

In the early 1980s, specifically for the 1981 season, the club's first kit manufacturer was Adidas, and the first shirt sponsor was Lan Chile, a successful Chilean travel company. That auspice remained during the presidency of Raúl Labán until 1989, but with the arrival of Peter Dragicevic in the 1990s, was only changed shirt sponsor, being the Russian car company Lada the new model, which was achieved 1991 Copa Libertadores (in the photo). Five years later, Colo-Colo changed his manufacturer to Nike and also its sponsor to Cristal, Chilean beer company that has been remained to date.

The following manufacturers were Puma (2002–2004), then was Reebok in 2005 and the next season with the arrival of Gabriel Ruíz Tagle as chairman, «Los Albos» signed with Umbro, that is the current sponsor of Colo-Colo.

== Kit suppliers and shirt sponsors ==
Period	Kit manufacturer	Shirt sponsor
1981–1989	Adidas	Lan Chile
1990–1996	Adidas	Lada
1997–2001	Nike	Cristal (Beer)
2002–2004	Puma	Cristal (Beer)
2005	Reebok	Cristal (Beer)
2006–2013	Umbro	Cristal (Beer)
2014–2015	Under Armour	Cristal (Beer)
2016–2019	Under Armour	DirecTV
