= List of Copa Libertadores winning managers =

This is a list of Copa Libertadores winning football managers. Uruguayan manager Roberto Scarone led Peñarol to success in the inaugural Copa Libertadores finals in 1960 and repeated the feat the following season. Argentine clubs and managers dominated the competition in the late 1960s and 1970s, winning 12 out of 15 tournaments from 1964 to 1978. In the 1990s Brazilian clubs and managers dominated the competition with six wins from 1992 to 1999, after which the second period of Argentine dominance began, with seven wins in the period from 2000 to 2009.

As of the most recent 2025 final, Argentine managers have been the most successful, winning 27 out of 65 tournaments held, followed by Brazilians with 21 wins and Uruguayans with 10 titles. On only nine occasions the tournament was won by foreign managers: then-Yugoslav coach Mirko Jozić led Chilean side Colo-Colo to victory in 1991, and Argentine Edgardo Bauza won the tournament with Ecuadorian club LDU Quito. All three wins by Paraguayan side Olimpia came under foreign managers: Uruguayan Luis Cubilla led them to victory in 1979 and 1990, and Argentine Nery Pumpido in 2002. Portuguese managers Jorge Jesus, Abel Ferreira, and Artur Jorge won the title with Brazilian sides Flamengo, Palmeiras, and Botafogo respectively. Jesus won it in 2019, Ferreira in 2020 and 2021, and Artur Jorge in 2024. Jozić, Jesus, Ferreira, and Artur Jorge are also the only managers from outside South America to have won the competition.

The most successful individual manager is Argentine Carlos Bianchi who won the tournament on four occasions, leading Vélez Sársfield to success in 1994, and then again Boca Juniors in 2000, 2001 and 2003. He is followed by fellow Argentine Osvaldo Zubeldía with three consecutive wins in 1968, 1969 and 1970 (all with Estudiantes), while twelve other managers won the tournament twice.

Along with Carlos Bianchi, only three other managers have won the title with more than one club: Brazilians Paulo Autuori (with Cruzeiro in 1997 and São Paulo in 2005), Luiz Felipe Scolari (with Grêmio in 1995 and Palmeiras in 1999), and Argentine Edgardo Bauza (with LDU Quito in 2008 and San Lorenzo in 2014). Bauza is also the only manager to have won the competition with two clubs from different countries.

As of 2025, a total of 9 people have won the Copa Libertadores both as a player and as a manager, with Luis Cubilla being the only one to achieve multiple titles as each (3 as a player, 2 as a manager).

The data below does not include the 1948 South American Championship of Champions, as it is not listed by CONMEBOL either as a Copa Libertadores edition or as an official competition. However, at least in the years 1996 and 1997, CONMEBOL entitled equal status to both Copa Libertadores and the 1948 tournament, in that the 1948 champion club (CR Vasco da Gama) was allowed to participate in Supercopa Libertadores, a CONMEBOL official competition that allowed participation for former Libertadores champions only (for example, not admitting participation for champions of other CONMEBOL official competitions, such as Copa CONMEBOL). The 1948 competition is referred to at the Conmebol website as the competition that, 12 years later, would become the Copa Libertadores.

== By year ==
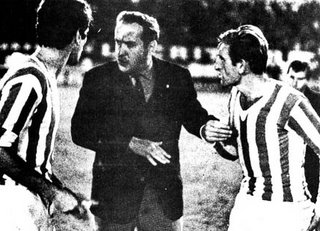
Osvaldo Zubeldía, winning manager in 1968, 1969 and 1970

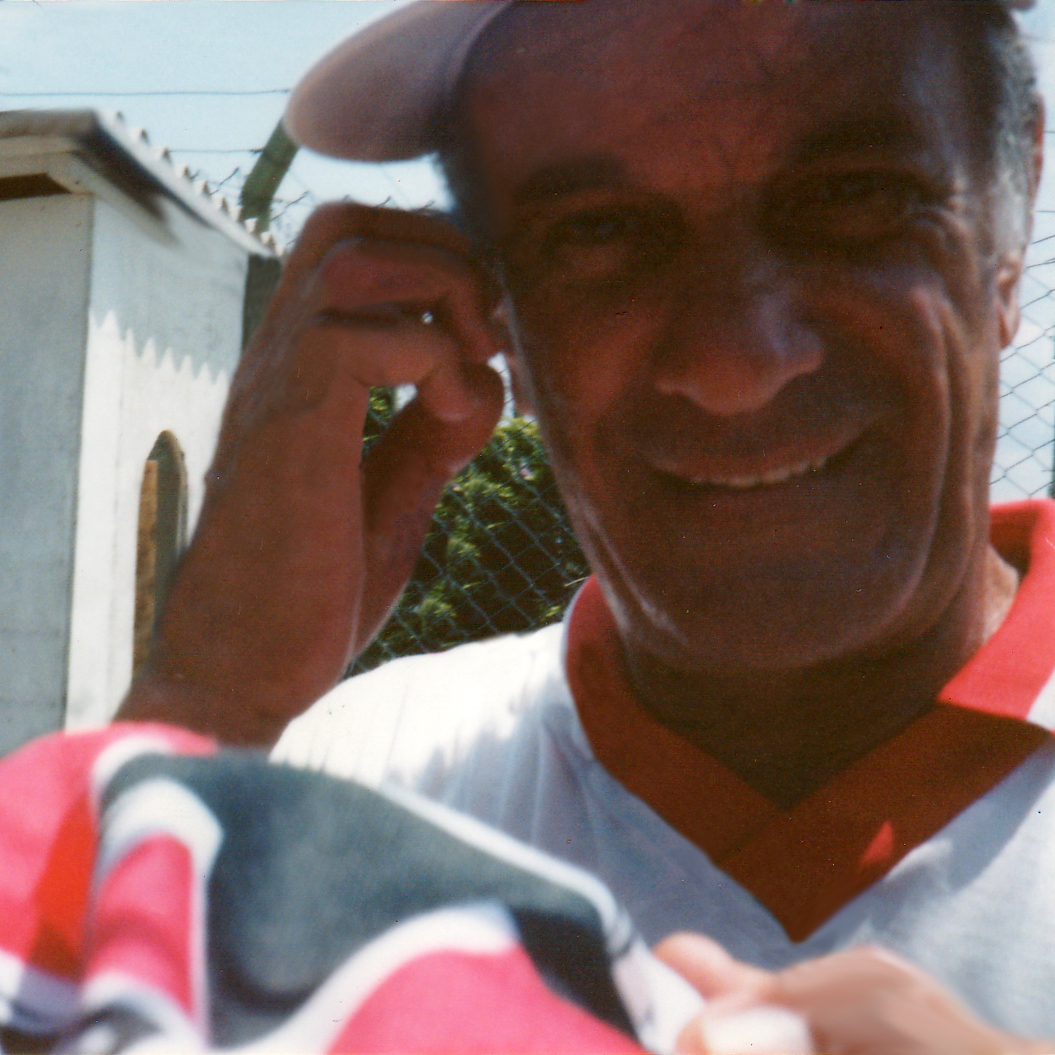
Telê Santana, winning manager in 1992 and 1993

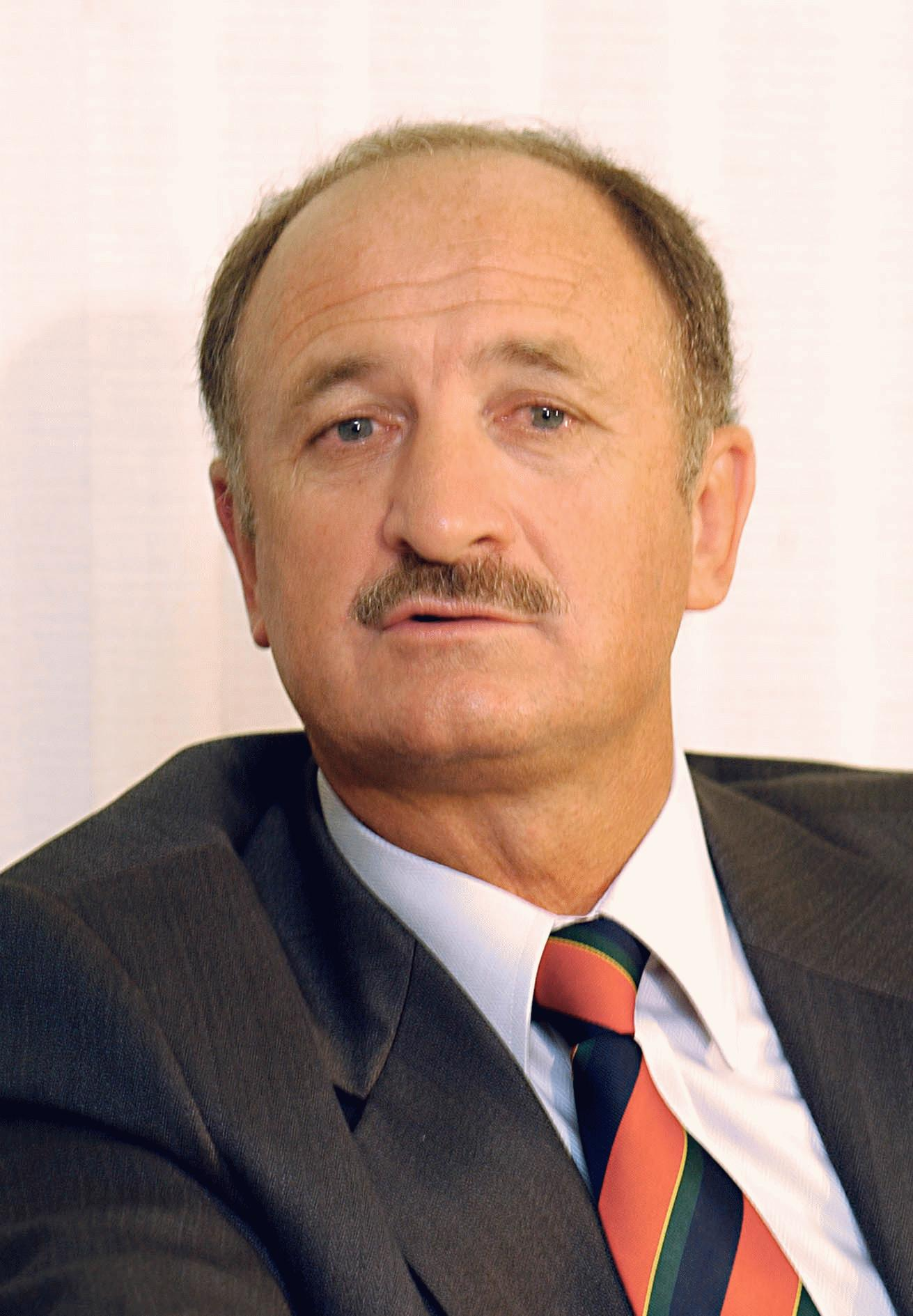
Luiz Felipe Scolari, winning manager in 1995 and 1999

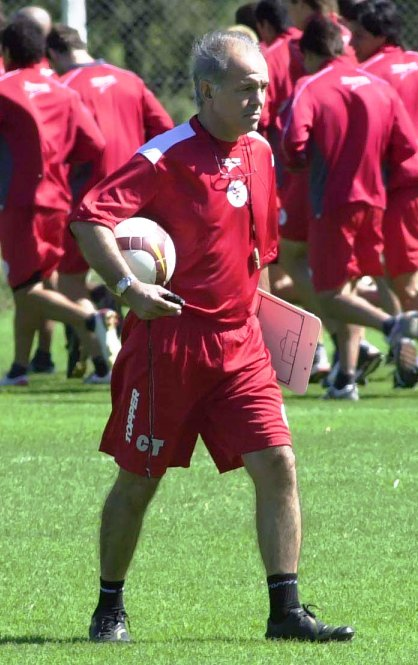
Alejandro Sabella, winning manager in 2009

Finals	Nationality	Winning manager	Country	Club	Ref
1960	URU	Roberto Scarone	URU	Peñarol	
1961	URU	Roberto Scarone (2)	URU	Peñarol (2)	
1962	BRA	Lula	BRA	Santos	
1963	BRA	Lula (2)	BRA	Santos (2)	
1964	ARG	Manuel Giúdice	ARG	Independiente	
1965	ARG	Manuel Giúdice (2)	ARG	Independiente (2)	
1966	URU	Roque Máspoli	URU	Peñarol (3)	
1967	ARG	Juan José Pizzuti	ARG	Racing	
1968	ARG	Osvaldo Zubeldía	ARG	Estudiantes	
1969	ARG	Osvaldo Zubeldía (2)	ARG	Estudiantes (2)	
1970	ARG	Osvaldo Zubeldía (3)	ARG	Estudiantes (3)	
1971	URU	Washington Etchamendi	URU	Nacional	
1972	ARG	Pedro Dellacha	ARG	Independiente (3)	
1973	ARG	Humberto Maschio	ARG	Independiente (4)	
1974	ARG	Roberto Ferreiro	ARG	Independiente (5)	
1975	ARG	Pedro Dellacha (2)	ARG	Independiente (6)	
1976	BRA	Zezé Moreira	BRA	Cruzeiro	
1977	ARG	Juan Carlos Lorenzo	ARG	Boca Juniors	
1978	ARG	Juan Carlos Lorenzo (2)	ARG	Boca Juniors (2)	
1979	URU	Luis Cubilla	PAR	Olimpia	
1980	URU	Juan Mujica	URU	Nacional (2)	
1981	BRA	Paulo César Carpegiani	BRA	Flamengo	
1982	URU	Hugo Bagnulo	URU	Peñarol (4)	
1983	BRA	Valdir Espinosa	BRA	Grêmio	
1984	ARG	José Pastoriza	ARG	Independiente (7)	
1985	ARG	José Yudica	ARG	Argentinos Juniors	
1986	ARG	Héctor Veira	ARG	River Plate	
1987	URU	Oscar Tabárez	URU	Peñarol (5)	
1988	URU	Roberto Fleitas	URU	Nacional (3)	
1989	COL	Francisco Maturana	COL	Atlético Nacional	
1990	URU	Luis Cubilla (2)	PAR	Olimpia (2)	
1991	YUG	Mirko Jozić	CHI	Colo-Colo	
1992	BRA	Telê Santana	BRA	São Paulo	
1993	BRA	Telê Santana (2)	BRA	São Paulo (2)	
1994	ARG	Carlos Bianchi	ARG	Vélez Sársfield	
1995	BRA	Luiz Felipe Scolari	BRA	Grêmio (2)	
1996	ARG	Ramón Díaz	ARG	River Plate (2)	
1997	BRA	Paulo Autuori	BRA	Cruzeiro (2)	
1998	BRA	Antônio Lopes	BRA	Vasco da Gama	
1999	BRA	Luiz Felipe Scolari (2)	BRA	Palmeiras	
2000	ARG	Carlos Bianchi (2)	ARG	Boca Juniors (3)	
2001	ARG	Carlos Bianchi (3)	ARG	Boca Juniors (4)	
2002	ARG	Nery Pumpido	PAR	Olimpia (3)	
2003	ARG	Carlos Bianchi (4)	ARG	Boca Juniors (5)	
2004	COL	Luis Fernando Montoya	COL	Once Caldas	
2005	BRA	Paulo Autuori (2)	BRA	São Paulo (3)	
2006	BRA	Abel Braga	BRA	Internacional	
2007	ARG	Miguel Ángel Russo	ARG	Boca Juniors (6)	
2008	ARG	Edgardo Bauza	ECU	LDU Quito	
2009	ARG	Alejandro Sabella	ARG	Estudiantes (4)	
2010	BRA	Celso Roth	BRA	Internacional (2)	
2011	BRA	Muricy Ramalho	BRA	Santos (3)	
2012	BRA	Tite	BRA	Corinthians	
2013	BRA	Cuca	BRA	Atlético Mineiro	
2014	ARG	Edgardo Bauza (2)	ARG	San Lorenzo	
2015	ARG	Marcelo Gallardo	ARG	River Plate (3)	
2016	COL	Reinaldo Rueda	COL	Atlético Nacional (2)	
2017	BRA	Renato Gaúcho	BRA	Grêmio (3)	
2018	ARG	Marcelo Gallardo (2)	ARG	River Plate (4)	
2019	POR	Jorge Jesus	BRA	Flamengo (2)	
2020	POR	Abel Ferreira	BRA	Palmeiras (2)	
2021	POR	Abel Ferreira (2)	BRA	Palmeiras (3)	
2022	BRA	Dorival Júnior	BRA	Flamengo (3)	
2023	BRA	Fernando Diniz	BRA	Fluminense	
2024	POR	Artur Jorge	BRA	Botafogo	
2025	BRA	Filipe Luís	BRA	Flamengo (4)	

== Managers with multiple titles ==
Rank	Nation	Manager	Won	Runner-up	Years won	Years runner-up	Clubs won
1	Argentina	Carlos Bianchi	4	1	1994, 2000, 2001, 2003	2004	Vélez Sarsfield, Boca Juniors
2	Argentina	Osvaldo Zubeldía	3	—	1968, 1969, 1970	—	Estudiantes
3	Uruguay	Luis Cubilla	2	2	1979, 1990	1989, 1991	Olimpia
3	Brazil	**Luiz Felipe Scolari**	2	2	1995, 1999	2000, 2022	Grêmio, Palmeiras
5	Uruguay	Roberto Scarone	2	1	1960, 1961	1972	Peñarol
5	Argentina	Juan Carlos Lorenzo	2	1	1977, 1978	1979	Boca Juniors
5	Brazil	Telê Santana	2	1	1992, 1993	1994	São Paulo
5	Argentina	**Marcelo Gallardo**	2	1	2015, 2018	2019	River Plate
5	Portugal	**Abel Ferreira**	2	1	2020, 2021	2025	Palmeiras
10	Brazil	Lula	2	—	1962, 1963	—	Santos
10	Argentina	Manuel Giúdice	2	—	1964, 1965	—	Independiente
10	Argentina	Pedro Dellacha	2	—	1972, 1975	—	Independiente
10	Brazil	**Paulo Autuori**	2	—	1997, 2005	—	Cruzeiro, São Paulo
10	Argentina	Edgardo Bauza	2	—	2008, 2014	—	LDU Quito, San Lorenzo

**Bold**	=	Still active as manager

== By nationality ==
Country	Managers	Total
Argentina	17	27
Brazil	17	21
Uruguay	8	10
Portugal	3	4
Colombia	3	3
Yugoslavia	1	1

== See also ==
- Copa Libertadores records and statistics
