= José Roberto Wright =

Brazilian football referee

Domestic
| Years | League | Role |

International
| Years | League | Role |

José Roberto Ramiz Wright, also known as José Roberto Wright or José Ramiz Wright (born September 7, 1944 in Rio de Janeiro), is a former Brazilian football referee.

== Career ==
Wright supervised four matches during the 1990 FIFA World Cup in Italy, including the semi-final between eventual champions West Germany and England, which ended in a 1–1 draw, with the eventual champions prevailing 4–3 on penalties. The latter match is widely remembered in England for the yellow card that Wright awarded to Paul Gascoigne in extra-time, which meant that he would not have been eligible to play in the World Cup final, if England had qualified, as he had already been cautioned in the round of 16 against Beligum; the booking led Gascoigne to burst into tears.

Later that year, Wright also refereed the 1990 Intercontinental Cup final, in which AC Milan defeated Olimpia 3–0 at the National Stadium, Tokyo.

The following year, he refereed the second leg of the 1991 Copa Libertadores finals between Colo–Colo and Olimpia, as well as two matches at the 1991 Copa América in Chile.

== Major matches refereed ==
| Date | Match | Tournament | Venue | Result | Ref |
|---|---|---|---|---|---|
| 9 December 1990 | AC Milan vs. Olimpia | 1990 Intercontinental Cup final | National Stadium, Tokyo | 3–0 | |
| 5 June 1991 | Colo–Colo vs. Olimpia | 1991 Copa Libertadores finals (second leg) | Estadio Monumental David Arellano, Santiago | 3–0 (3–0 on aggregate) | |

== Honours ==
- IFFHS World's Best Referee: 1990
