= Miguel Ramírez (footballer, born 1970) =

Chilean footballer and manager (born 1970)

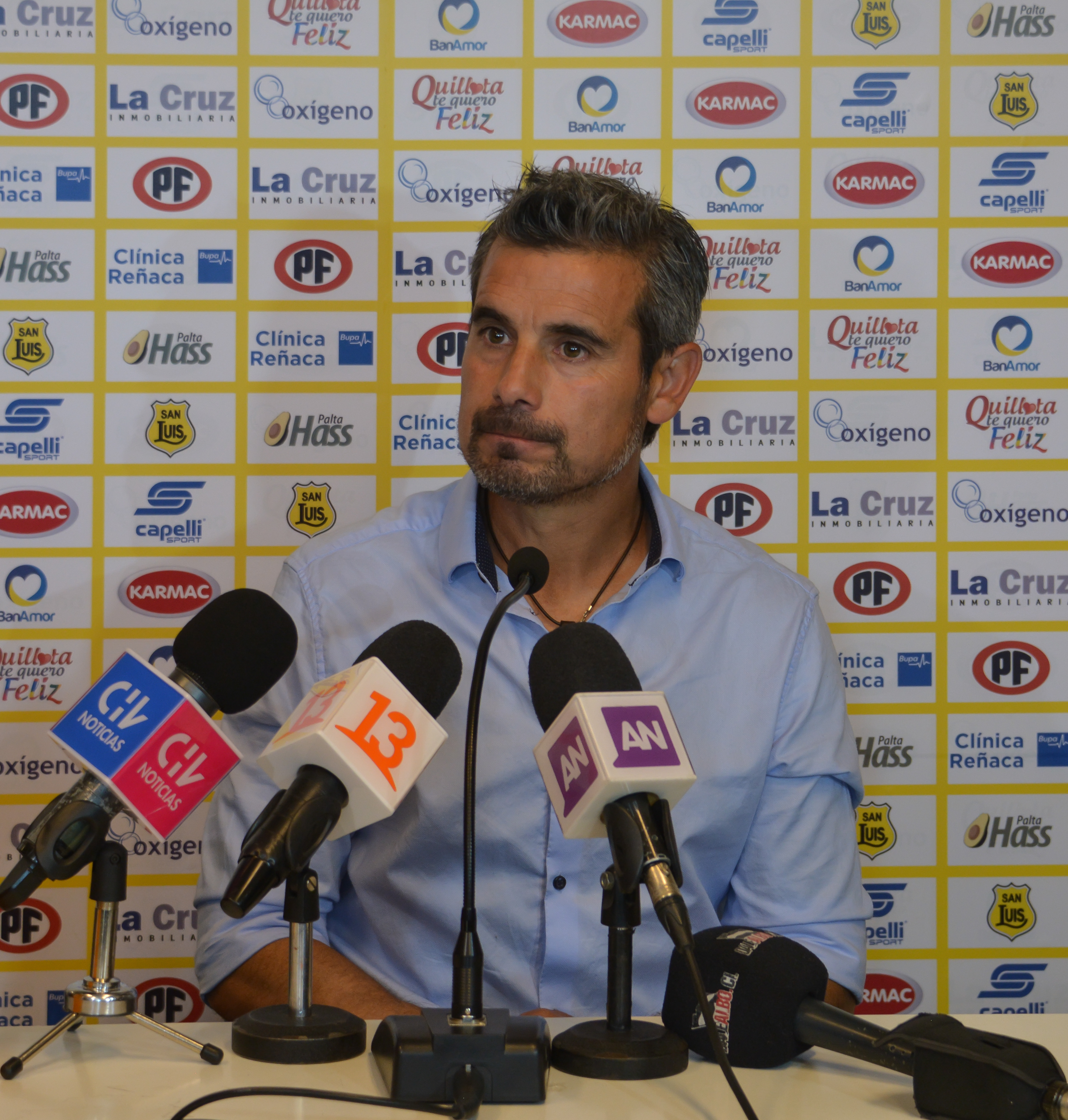
- Ramírez with San Luis in 2018

Personal information
- Full name: Miguel Mauricio Ramírez Pérez
- Date of birth: June 11, 1970 (age 56)
- Place of birth: Santiago, Chile
- Height: 1.76 m (5 ft 9 1/2 in)
- Position: Defender

Team information
- Current team: Unión Española (manager)

Youth career
- Los Cóndores
- Colo-Colo

Senior career*
Years	Team	Apps	(Gls)
1988–1995	Colo-Colo	178	(11)
1995–1996	Real Sociedad	10	(0)
1996–1997	Monterrey	34	(0)
1997–2003	Universidad Católica	188	(25)
2004–2005	Colo-Colo	66	(2)
Total		477	(38)

International career
1991–2004	Chile	62	(1)

Managerial career
- Universidad Católica (youth)
- 2012: Chile U17
- 2013–2014: Deportes Iquique (assistant)
- 2014: Deportes Antofagasta (assistant)
- 2015–2018: San Luis
- 2018–2021: Santiago Wanderers
- 2021: O'Higgins
- 2022–2023: Universidad de Concepción
- 2024–2025: Deportes Iquique
- 2025–: Unión Española
- * Club domestic league appearances and goals

Miguel Mauricio Ramírez Pérez (born 11 June 1970) is a Chilean football manager and former player who played as a defender. He is currently in charge of Unión Española.

Ramírez was capped 62 times and scored 1 goal for the Chile national team between 1991 and 2003, including three games at the 1998 FIFA World Cup.

== Club career ==
Ramírez started his career in 1991 with Colo-Colo, where he was part of two league championship winning campaigns in 1991 and 1993. During his time with the club, it also won the Copa Libertadores in 1991, Copa Interamericana 1991 and Recopa Sudamericana in 1992.

Ramírez played in Spain with Real Sociedad and in Mexico with C.F. Monterrey before returning to Chile in 1997 to join Universidad Católica. At Universidad Católica, he won a further two league championships. He spent his last years as a professional back at Colo-Colo.

== Coaching career ==
In 2022, Ramírez assumed as the manager of Universidad de Concepción. In 2024, he switched to Deportes Iquique. In June 2025, he was appointed the manager of Unión Española for the second half of the year.

== Personal life ==
Ramírez is nicknamed Cheíto, due to his resemblance to the character of the same name portrayed by Manuel Carrillo from the Venezuelan TV series Abigail. The nicknamed was given by his teammate in Colo-Colo, Miguel Vargas.

His elder son, Nicolás, is a sports journalist who has worked for ESPN Chile.

== Honours ==
=== Player ===
Colo-Colo

- Primera División de Chile (2): 1991, 1993
- Copa Libertadores (1): 1991
- Recopa Sudamericana (1): 1992
- Copa Interamericana (1): 1992

Universidad Católica

- Primera División de Chile (1): 2002 Apertura

=== Manager ===
Santiago Wanderers

- Primera B de Chile (1): 2019
