= Carlos Luis Morales =

Ecuadorian footballer and journalist (1965–2020)

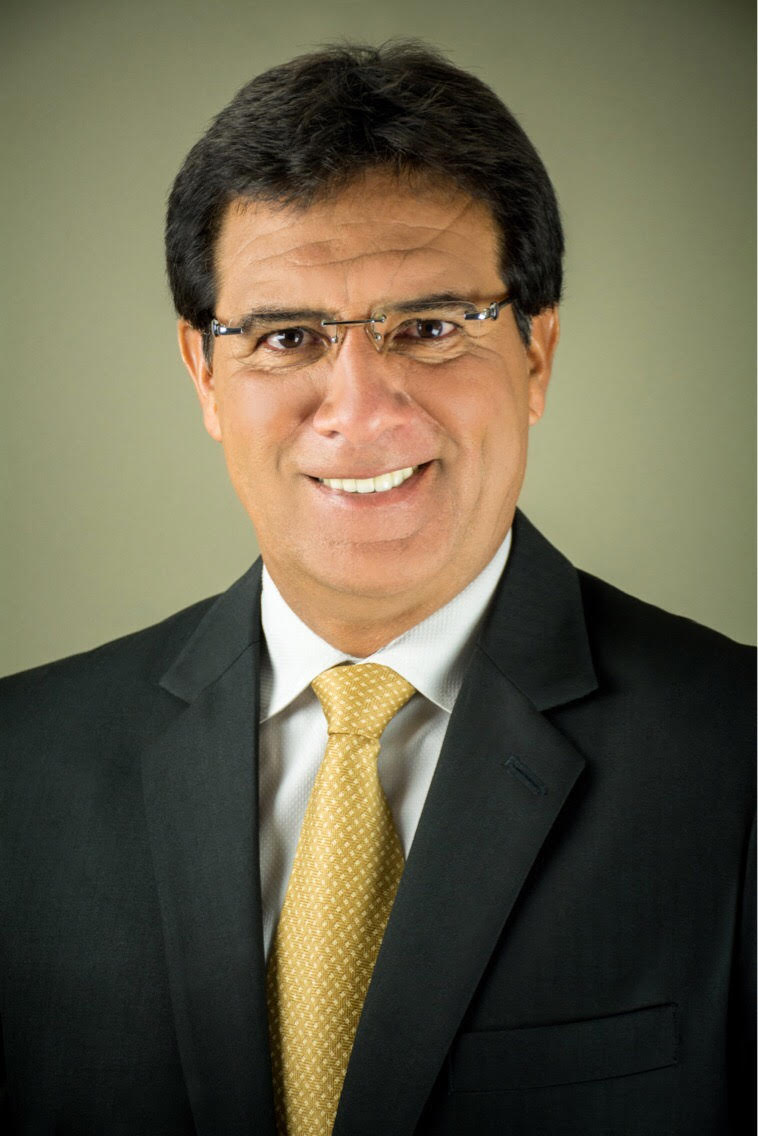

Personal information
- Full name: Carlos Luis Morales Benítez
- Date of birth: June 12, 1965
- Place of birth: Guayaquil, Ecuador
- Date of death: June 22, 2020 (aged 55)
- Place of death: Samborondón, Ecuador
- Height: 1.79 m (5 ft 10 in)
- Position: Goalkeeper

Senior career*
Years	Team	Apps	(Gls)
1983–1994	Barcelona SC		
1994–1995	Independiente	22	(0)
1995	LDU Portoviejo		
1996	Barcelona SC		
1997	Emelec		
1998	Palestino	25	(0)
1999–2000	ESPOLI		
2001	Santa Rita		

International career
1987–1999	Ecuador	40	(0)
- * Club domestic league appearances and goals

Carlos Luis Morales Benítez (12 June 1965 – 22 June 2020) was a journalist and a football goalkeeper from Ecuador. He also served as elected prefect of Guayas Province.

== Football career ==
- (Ecuador) Barcelona 1983–1994
- (Argentina) Independiente 1994–1995
- (Ecuador) LDU Portoviejo 1995
- (Ecuador) Barcelona 1996
- (Ecuador) Emelec 1997
- (Chile) Palestino 1998
- (Ecuador) ESPOLI 1999–2000
- (Ecuador) Santa Rita 2001

== Corruption scandals ==
On June 3, 2020, Carlos Luis Morales was detained in an investigation for alleged use of unfair influence in the acquisition of medical supplies, COVID-19 exams and masks.

After 5 hours of persecution and police search, he was detained in San Isidro, a citadel on the road to Samborondón, after several houses were raided in the sector before he was captured, within investigations for alleged traffic crimes, of influence and embezzlement. The situation worsened after Morales presented 17 contracts in which his wife, Sandra Arcos, and his wife's children, Xavier and Andrés Vélez, fugitives from justice, involved in the awards, were involved in contracts with surcharges during the health emergency of COVID-19.

The corruption scandals occurred a year after occupying the post of Prefect of Guayas. PSC assembly members of the party that promoted his candidacy, asked Carlos Luis Morales to explain corruption allegations or resign. The pronouncement of the social-Christian legislators was signed by: Vicente Taiano, César Rohón, Raúl Auquilla, Patricia Henriquez, Mercedes Serrano, Vicente Almeyda, Henry Cucalón, Dennis Marín, Magda Zambrano, Ramón Terán, Raúl Campoverde, Cristina Reyes, Dallyana Passailague, Javier Cadena, Henry Kronfle, and Esteban Torres.

Morales died from COVID-19 in 2020.
