= Ever Almeida =

Paraguayan footballer (born 1948)

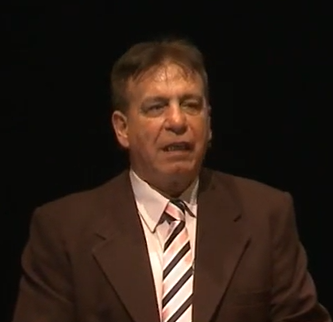
- Almeida in 2013

Personal information
- Full name: Ever Hugo Almeida Almada
- Date of birth: 1 July 1948 (age 78)
- Place of birth: Salto, Uruguay
- Height: 1.78 m (5 ft 10 in)
- Position: Goalkeeper

Senior career*
Years	Team	Apps	(Gls)
1967–1971	Cerro	128	(0)
1972	Guaraní	12	(0)
1973–1991	Olimpia	298	(0)
Total		438	(0)

International career
1975–1985	Paraguay	22	(0)

Managerial career
- 1992: Nacional
- 1993: Olimpia
- 1996: Sportivo Luqueño
- 1997–1998: Sol de América
- 1999: Paraguay
- 2000: Sol de América
- 2001–2004: Municipal
- 2004–2007: El Nacional
- 2008: Barcelona SC
- 2008–2009: Olimpia
- 2009–2010: Nacional
- 2010–2013: Guatemala
- 2013–2014: Olimpia
- 2015–2017: Libertad
- 2017: Sportivo Trinidense
- 2017: Olimpia
- 2017: Municipal
- 2018: Sol de América
- 2019: Rionegro Águilas
- 2021: Sol de América
- 2022–2024: El Nacional
- 2024–2025: Mushuc Runa
- 2025: Olimpia
- * Club domestic league appearances and goals

Ever Hugo Almeida Almada (born 1 July 1948) is a Paraguayan football manager and former player who played as a goalkeeper.

Almeida was born in Salto, Uruguay, but became a naturalized Paraguayan in 1975.

== Career ==
=== As player ===
Almeida made his professional debut in 1967 at the age of 19 playing for C.A. Cerro of Montevideo. After a few years in the Uruguayan football league he was transferred to Club Guaraní of Paraguay. Shortly afterwards, in 1973, he received an offer from Olimpia. From that point on Almeida played with Olimpia for nearly two decades, setting a record for being the player with most appearances in the Copa Libertadores with 113, from 1973 to 1990, winning the tournament on two occasions (1979 and 1990); Olimpia's dominance of Paraguayan football meant he and his team only missed two of the 18 tournaments played in this period (1978 and 1985). He also won the Intercontinental Cup (1979), Supercopa Sudamericana (1990), and the Recopa Sudamericana (1991), along with several Paraguayan national championships with Olimpia.

=== As coach ===
After retiring as a player, Almeida worked in sports journalism and later became a coach of teams like Sol de América and Olimpia of Paraguay, Municipal of Guatemala, Nacional of Quito and Barcelona SC of Ecuador; and he even coached the Paraguay national team in 1999 during the Copa América. In August 2008, Almeida was chosen as the new coach of Olimpia replacing Gustavo Costas, marking his return to the club since 1993. Almeida achieved success as a coach by winning championships in Paraguay, Guatemala and Ecuador. He also coached Club Nacional of Paraguay.

In May 2010 Almeida was appointed as the new coach of Guatemala.

== Honours ==
=== Player ===
- Olimpia
  - Paraguayan Primera División: 1975, 1978, 1979, 1980, 1981, 1982, 1983, 1985, 1988, and 1989
  - Copa Libertadores: 1979, 1990
  - Copa Interamericana: 1979
  - Intercontinental Cup: 1979
  - Supercopa Sudamericana: 1990
  - Recopa Sudamericana: 1991

=== Coach ===
Olimpia

- Paraguayan Primera División: 1993

Municipal

- Liga Nacional de Fútbol de Guatemala: 2001, 2002, and 2003

El Nacional

- Ecuadorian Serie A: 2005, 2006
- Ecuadorian Serie B: 2022
