= Mario Rebollo =

Uruguayan footballer (born 1964)

Personal information
- Full name: Mario Alberto Rebollo Bergero
- Date of birth: 8 December 1964 (age 61)
- Place of birth: Montevideo, Uruguay
- Height: 1.84 m (6 ft 0 in)
- Position: Defender

Youth career
- Montevideo Wanderers

Senior career*
Years	Team	Apps	(Gls)
1984–1989	Montevideo Wanderers		
1989–1990	San Lorenzo	3	(0)
1991	Cerro		
1992	Colo-Colo	8	(0)
1993	Bella Vista		
1994	Deportivo Cuenca		
1994–1995	Central Español		
1996	Cienciano		
1997	José Gálvez		
1997–1998	Rentistas		

International career
1988	Uruguay	5	(0)

Managerial career
- 2006–2021: Uruguay (assistant)
- * Club domestic league appearances and goals

Mario Alberto Rebollo Bergero (born 8 December 1964) is a Uruguayan football coach and former player. He most recently was the assistant manager of the Uruguay national team.

== Playing career ==
In Chile, Rebollo played for Colo-Colo.

Rebollo is a former Uruguayan international. He made his international debut on 27 September 1988 in a 2–1 win against Ecuador.

== Coaching career ==
Rebollo served as an assistant coach at Uruguay national team to Óscar Tabárez from 2006 to 2021.

== Career statistics ==
=== International ===
Appearances and goals by national team and year
National team	Year	Apps	Goals
Uruguay	1988	5	0
Total		5	0
