= Silviano Delgado =

Mexican footballer (born 1969)

Personal information
- Full name: Silviano Delgado Valladolid
- Date of birth: September 4, 1969 (age 57)
- Place of birth: Coatzacoalcos, Mexico
- Height: 1.77 m (5 ft 10 in)
- Position: Midfielder

Senior career*
Years	Team	Apps	(Gls)
1988–1995	Puebla	59	(2)
1995–1996	Toluca	15	(0)
1996–2000	Morelia	50	(2)
2000–2001	Lagartos de Tabasco	23	(1)
2002	Alacranes de Durango	11	(0)
2002	Albinegros de Orizaba	14	(1)
2003–2004	Delfines de Coatzacoalcos	13	(0)

International career
- Mexico U23
- * Club domestic league appearances and goals as of 19-07-10

Silviano Delgado Valladolid (born 4 September 1969) is a Mexican former professional footballer, who played as a midfielder during his nine-year career in Mexico's top tier Puebla, Toluca, and Morelia.

== International career ==
At international level, he was a member of the Mexico national under-23 football team competing at the 1992 Summer Olympics in Barcelona, Spain. Delgado started all three matches in the tournament. After his time with Puebla FC, he played for Deportivo Toluca FC in 1995/96 and for CA Monarcas Morelia for the next four years before retiring to the second division. There he first played for Lagartos de Tabasco, then for Alacranes de Durango and Albinegros de Orizaba, and most recently for Delfines de Coatzacoalcos.
