= Jimmy Izquierdo =

Ecuadorian footballer (1961-1994)

Personal information
- Date of birth: 28 May 1961
- Date of death: 23 April 1994 (aged 32)
- Position: Defender

International career
Years	Team	Apps	(Gls)
1988–1989	Ecuador	10	(1)

Jimmy Izquierdo (28 May 1961 – 23 April 1994) was an Ecuadorian footballer. He played in ten matches for the Ecuador national football team from 1988 to 1989. He was also part of Ecuador's squad for the 1989 Copa América tournament.
