= 1991 Recopa Sudamericana =

- Event: Recopa Sudamericana
- The event was scratched and Olimpia was declared champion after having won both the Copa Libertadores and Supercopa.

The 1991 Recopa Sudamericana was the third Recopa Sudamericana, an annual football match between the winners of the previous season's Copa Libertadores and Supercopa Sudamericana competitions. "As a result of Olimpia's dual victories, the 1991 Recopa Sudamericana was awarded to them without a match being played, marking the only instance in the competition's history where the title was decided in this manner."

However, this edition was scratched and Olimpia of Paraguay were awarded the Recopa Sudamericana as the club won both the 1990 Copa Libertadores and 1990 Supercopa Sudamericana.

Olimpia's feat of being crowned the champion of a competition without having played a match was unprecedented in the history of international football.
