= Mario Ramírez (footballer) =

Paraguayan footballer and coach (born 1965)

Personal information
- Full name: Mario César Ramírez Estigarribia
- Date of birth: 25 May 1965 (age 61)
- Place of birth: Limpio, Paraguay
- Height: 1.85 m (6 ft 1 in)
- Position: Central defender

International career
Years	Team	Apps	(Gls)
1989–1993	Paraguay	12	(1)

Mario César Ramírez Estigarribia (born 25 May 1965, in Limpio, Paraguay) is a former football defender and coach.

== Career ==
=== As player ===
Ramírez started his career in the youth divisions of Club 1 de Mayo de Limpio and then moved to Club Fulgencio Yegros, also from the city of Limpio. His good performances caught the eyes of Club Sol de América of the Paraguayan 1st division, which signed him for five years. During his years at Sol de América, Ramírez won the 1st division title in 1986 and was runners-up with the team in 1988. He then went on to sign for Argentine side Textil Mandiyú in 1989 before returning to Paraguay to play for Olimpia Asunción where he won national and international titles such as the Copa Libertadores and the Supercopa Sudamericana in 1990. He was then transferred to CD Veracruz of Mexico and played for a year and a half in the team before having contractual problems that kept him off the fields from over 2 years. After sorting out his contract problem he was released by Veracruz and in 1998 he returned to Paraguay to play for teams like Sportivo Luqueño, Tembetary, Guaraní and 12 de Octubre before retiring.

Ramírez also served for the Paraguay national team, playing the 1993 Copa América tournament.

=== As coach ===
After retirement he became a coach and managed teams like Club 12 de Octubre, Club Martín Ledesma and Club Silvio Pettirossi. His nickname is "RoboCop".

== Titles ==
=== As player ===
Season	Team	Title
1986	Sol de América	Paraguay 1st division
1990	Olimpia	Copa Libertadores
1990	Olimpia	Supercopa Sudamericana
1990	Olimpia	Recopa Sudamericana
1992	Olimpia	Torneo República
1993	Olimpia	Paraguay 1st division
