= Juan Ramírez (footballer, born 1965) =

Paraguayan footballer and coach

Personal information
- Full name: Juan Zacarías Ramírez Candia
- Date of birth: 26 September 1961 (age 65)
- Place of birth: Encarnación, Paraguay
- Position: Defender

Senior career*
Years	Team	Apps	(Gls)
1980–1982	Atl. San Juan (Encarnación)		
1982–1984	Juventud (Hohenau)		
1984–1987	Atl. Colegiales		
1988–1991	Olimpia		
1992	Sol de América		
1993	Atl. Colegiales		
1994	Sportivo Trinidense		
- * Club domestic league appearances and goals

Juan Zacarías Ramírez Candia (born 25 May 1965) is a former football defender and coach.

== Career ==
=== As player ===
Ramírez started his career in local clubs San Juan and Juventud de Hohenau from the city of Encarnación before arriving to 1st division club Atlético Colegiales in 1984. In 1986, he was chosen as the best right-back defender of the Paraguayan league by the press. Despite the award, he did not make the national team that competed in the 1986 FIFA World Cup. In 1988, he signed for Olimpia Asunción where he won national and international titles such as the Copa Libertadores and the Supercopa Sudamericana in 1990. After leaving Olimpia in 1991, Ramírez had brief stints in Paraguayan clubs such as Sol de América and Sportivo Trinidense before retiring in 1994.

=== As coach ===
Ramírez received his coaching license in 1997 and has worked with the U20, U17 and Reserve teams of Olimpia in 1997 and 1998. He managed Club Universal in 2000 and 2003, and Atlético Colegiales in 2001. Ramírez also worked as an assistant coach for Club Nacional in 2000.

== Titles ==
=== As player ===
Season	Team	Title
1980	Atlético San Juan	Encarnación League
1981	Atlético San Juan	Encarnación League
1988	Olimpia	Paraguay 1st division
1989	Olimpia	Paraguay 1st division
1990	Olimpia	Copa Libertadores
1990	Olimpia	Supercopa Sudamericana
1990	Olimpia	Recopa Sudamericana
