= Daniel Morón =

Argentine footballer

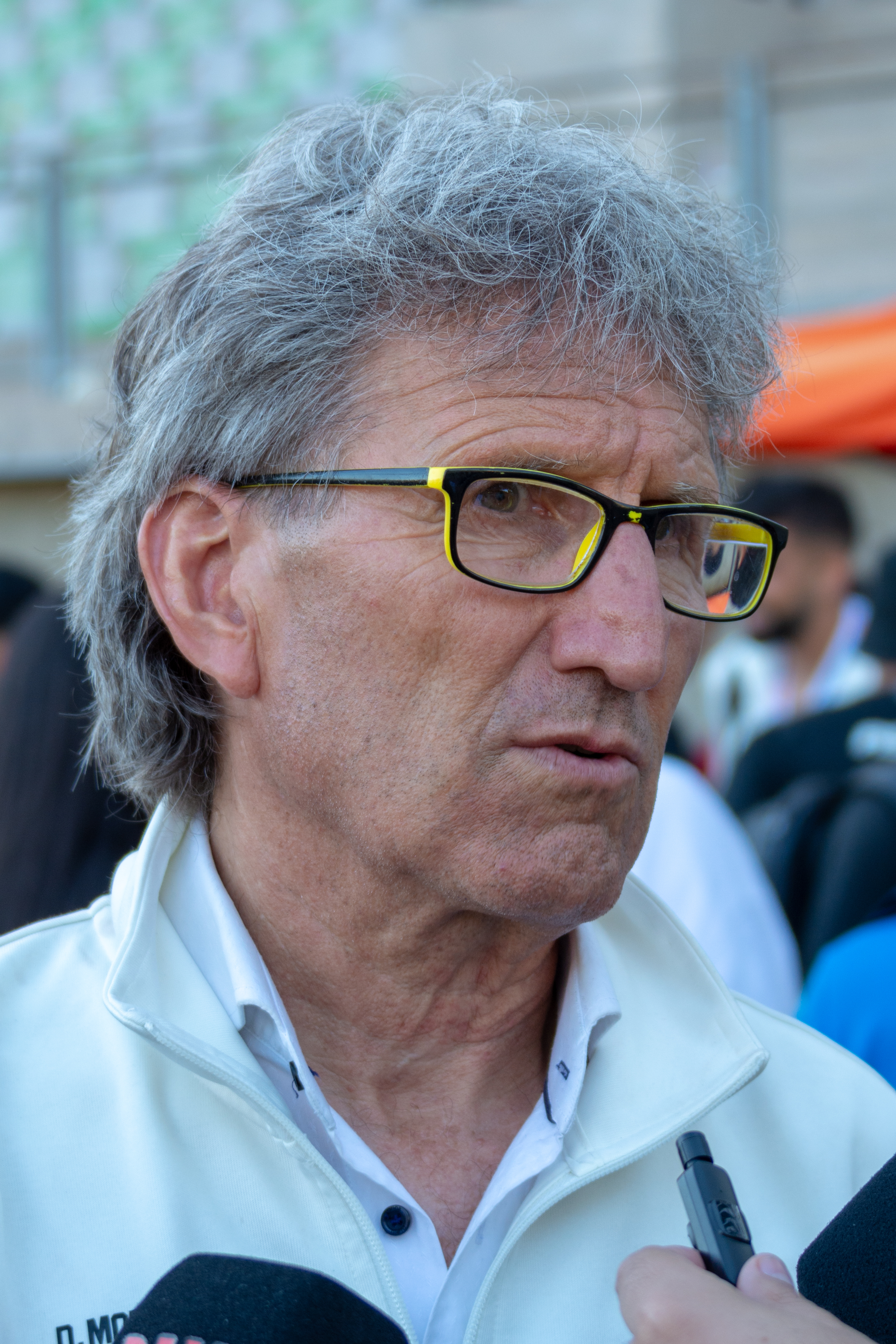

Personal information
- Full name: José Daniel Morón
- Date of birth: September 30, 1959 (age 67)
- Place of birth: Tunuyán, Argentina
- Position: Goalkeeper

Youth career
- Atlético Ledesma

Senior career*
| Years | Team | Apps | (Gls) |
| 1982 | Atlético Ledesma | – | (–) |
| 1983–1987 | Unión Santa Fe | 91 | (0) |
| 1987–1995 | Colo-Colo | | |
| 1995 | Provincial Osorno | 20 | (0) |
| 1996 | Deportes Concepción | | |
| 1997 | Palestino | | |
| 1998 | Audax Italiano | | |
- * Club domestic league appearances and goals

José Daniel Morón (born September 30, 1959) is an Argentine former football goalkeeper. He won the Copa Libertadores trophy in 1991 as goalkeeper for Chilean team Colo-Colo.

== Club career ==
Morón started his career at Atlético Ledesma in 1982, but soon joined Unión de Santa Fe in the Primera Division Argentina.

In September 1987, he was signed by Colo-Colo, where Morón won all of the major honors of his career.

After leaving Colo-Colo in 1995, he played for a number of other teams in Chile, including Provincial Osorno, Deportes Concepción, Palestino and Audax Italiano.

Morón retired from football in 1998.

== International career ==
A naturalized Chilean, Morón was called up to the Chile national team under Xabier Azkargorta for the friendlies against Bolivia, Mexico and Peru in February 1996. He was substitute.

== Personal life ==
Morón naturalized Chilean by residence in 1993.

Morón was a candidate to councillor for Frutillar commune in 2017.

== Titles ==
| Season | Club | Titles |
|---|---|---|
| 1989 | Colo-Colo | Liga Chilena de Fútbol: Primera División |
| 1990 | Colo-Colo | Liga Chilena de Fútbol: Primera División |
| 1991 | Colo-Colo | Liga Chilena de Fútbol: Primera División |
| 1991 | Colo-Colo | Copa Libertadores |
| 1992 | Colo-Colo | Recopa Sudamericana |
| 1992 | Colo-Colo | Copa Interamericana |
| 1993 | Colo-Colo | Liga Chilena de Fútbol: Primera División |
