= Gabriel González (Paraguayan footballer) =

Paraguayan footballer (born 1961)

Personal information
- Full name: Gabriel González Chaves
- Date of birth: 18 March 1961 (age 65)
- Place of birth: Itapé, Paraguay
- Height: 1.70 m (5 ft 7 in)
- Position: Midfielder

International career
Years	Team	Apps	(Gls)
1987–2001	Paraguay	34	(2)

Gabriel González Chaves (born 18 March 1961) is a former football player from Paraguay. He played as a forward or attacking midfielder.

Mostly known as "El Loco" González, he is one of the most recognized and loved players by fans of Club Olimpia of Paraguay. While playing for Olimpia, González won the Copa Libertadores, Supercopa Sudamericana, Recopa Sudamericana and several Paraguayan league titles, forming the feared Olimpia attacking trio of the early 1990s with teammates Adriano Samaniego and Raúl Vicente Amarilla.

== Club career ==
Apart from Olimpia "El Loco" also played for Argentine sides Estudiantes de La Plata and Colón de Santa Fe. In the latter, he became an idol of the Colón supporters after helping the team getting promoted to the first division in the 1994/95 season. In Peru, he played for Universitario de Deportes.

González earned the nickname "El Loco" (crazy) because of his unusual behavior and also for his "crazy" skills displayed on the pitch. His unusual behavior caused him trouble in a 2001 game where, while playing for Olimpia, he got sent off. Because he disagreed with the call he punched the referee (who had to go to the hospital immediately) and the aftermath was a permanent suspension from playing football which was later reduced to 2 1/2 years. He played one more match when he came on as a substitute against Libertad on 5 March 2004 before announcing his retirement.

Despite the incident, he still is regarded as an idol by the fans of both Olimpia and Colón de Santa Fe.

== International ==
González made his international debut for the Paraguay national football team on 14 June 1987 in a friendly match against Bolivia (0–2 win). He obtained a total number of 34 international caps, scoring two goals for the national side.

== Style of play ==
González was an extremely talented player, with good vision and passing skills, as well as finishing which allowed him to play as either a forward or attacking midfielder.

== Honours ==
Olympia

- Jawaharlal Nehru Centenary Club Cup: 1990

== See also ==
- Players and Records in Paraguayan Football
