= Adolfo Jara Heyn =

Paraguayan footballer and coach (born 1965)

Personal information
- Full name: Adolfo Ramón Jara Heyn
- Date of birth: 29 December 1965 (age 60)
- Place of birth: Asunción, Paraguay
- Height: 1.77 m (5 ft 10 in)
- Position: Midfielder

Senior career*
Years	Team	Apps	(Gls)
1985–2000	Olimpia		

International career
1990–1999	Paraguay	4	(0)
- * Club domestic league appearances and goals

Adolfo Ramón Jara Heyn (born 29 December 1965) is a former football midfielder, futsal player, and coach.

== Career ==
Heyn played for most his career in Olimpia Asunción where he won several national and international championships such as the Copa Libertadores and Supercopa Sudamericana. His brother, Luis, also played alongside him in Olimpia for eight years. Jara Heyn also played a few games for the Paraguay national football team during his career, including the U-20 FIFA World Cup of 1985. He also had a brief stint in futsal and represented the Paraguay national futsal team in the 1989 FIFA Futsal World Cup.

After retiring from football as a player he became a coach and was part of the Olimpia coaching staff during the 2007 season.

== Titles ==
=== As player ===
Season	Team	Title
1990	(Paraguay) Olimpia	Copa Libertadores
1990	(Paraguay) Olimpia	Supercopa Sudamericana
1990	(Paraguay) Olimpia	Recopa Sudamericana
1992	(Paraguay) Olimpia	Torneo República
1993	(Paraguay) Olimpia	Paraguay 1st division
1995	(Paraguay) Olimpia	Paraguay 1st division
1997	(Paraguay) Olimpia	Paraguay 1st division
1998	(Paraguay) Olimpia	Paraguay 1st division
1999	(Paraguay) Olimpia	Paraguay 1st division
2000	(Paraguay) Olimpia	Paraguay 1st division
