= 1990 Supercopa Libertadores =

1990 Supercopa Libertadores João Havelange

Tournament details
- Dates: 18 October 1990 – 11 January 1991
- Teams: 13 (from 4 confederations)

Final positions
- Champions: (Paraguay) Olimpia (1st title)
- Runners-up: (Uruguay) Nacional

Tournament statistics
- Matches played: 24
- Goals scored: 61 (2.54 per match)
- Top scorer(s): (Spain) Raúl Vicente Amarilla (7 goals)

The 1990 Supercopa Libertadores was the third season of the Supercopa Libertadores, a club football tournament for past Copa Libertadores winners. The tournament was won by Olimpia, who beat Nacional 6–3 on aggregate in the final.

Despite being a former Copa Libertadores winner, Colombian side Atlético Nacional were forced to withdraw after CONMEBOL had prohibited international matches in Colombia in 1990 following allegations that a referee was threatened by six gunmen on the occasion of a match between Atlético Nacional and Vasco da Gama during the 1990 Copa Libertadores quarter-finals.

== First round ==
The matches were played from 18 October to 8 November. Teams from the same nation could not be drawn against one another. Boca Juniors, as the title holders, entered the competition at the quarter-finals.

Team 1	Agg.	Team 2	1st leg	2nd leg
Peñarol (Uruguay)	2–2 (4–2 p)	(Brazil) Santos	0–0	2–2
Independiente (Argentina)	2–3	(Uruguay) Nacional	1–1	1–2
Cruzeiro (Brazil)	1–1 (2–4 p)	(Argentina) Racing	1–0	0–1
Argentinos Juniors (Argentina)	4–4 (4–3 p)	(Brazil) Flamengo	3–1	1–3
River Plate (Argentina)	3–3 (3–4 p)	(Paraguay) Olimpia	3–0	0–3
Grêmio (Brazil)	1–2	(Argentina) Estudiantes	1–0	0–2

== Quarter-finals ==
The matches were played from 14 to 21 November.

Team 1	Agg.	Team 2	1st leg	2nd leg
Peñarol (Uruguay)	2–1	(Argentina) Boca Juniors	0–1	2–0
Olimpia (Paraguay)	4–1	(Argentina) Racing	1–1	3–0
Argentinos Juniors (Argentina)	3–4	(Uruguay) Nacional	2–1	1–3
(Argentina) Estudiantes			Bye	

== Semi-finals ==
The matches were played from 28 November to 10 December.

Team 1	Agg.	Team 2	1st leg	2nd leg
Estudiantes (Argentina)	0–0 (3–5 p)	(Uruguay) Nacional	0–0	0–0
Peñarol (Uruguay)	2–7	(Paraguay) Olimpia	2–1	0–6

== Final ==
Team 1	Agg.	Team 2	1st leg	2nd leg
Nacional (Uruguay)	3–6	(Paraguay) Olimpia	0–3	3–3

1990 Supercopa
Sudamericana Winners

Olimpia
First title

== See also ==
- 1990 Copa Libertadores
