= Jorge Guasch =

Paraguayan footballer (born 1961)

Personal information
- Full name: Jorge Catalino Guasch Bazán
- Date of birth: 17 January 1961 (age 65)
- Place of birth: Itá, Paraguay
- Height: 1.74 m (5 ft 8 1/2 in)
- Position: Midfielder

Senior career*
| Years | Team | Apps | (Gls) |
| 1975 | Guaraní de Davaru | | |
| 1976–1991 | Club Olimpia | 466 | (6) |

International career
| 1985–1991 | Paraguay | 47 | (0) |
- * Club domestic league appearances and goals

Jorge Catalino Guasch Bazán (born 17 January 1961, in Itá, Paraguay) is a former football midfielder.

Nicknamed "El Chino" (the Chinese), Guasch started his career at the small regional club Guaraní de Davaru in the city of Carapeguá, in 1975. Scouts from Club Olimpia noticed his talent and one year later, in 1976, he was playing in the Paraguayan first division. Guasch became Olimpia's captain in 1988 and he remained with the club until his retirement in 1991, winning several national and international championships. He is regarded as one of the club's most important players.

== International ==
Guasch made his international debut for the Paraguay national football team on 3 February 1985, in a friendly match against Uruguay (1–0 loss). He obtained a total number of 47 international caps, scoring no goals for the national side. Guasch was part of the Paraguay squad at the 1986 World Cup and also competed in several Copa América tournament editions.

== Honours ==
=== Club ===
- Olimpia
  - Paraguayan Primera División: 1978, 1979, 1980, 1981, 1982, 1983, 1985, 1988, 1989
  - Copa Libertadores: 1979, 1990
  - Copa Interamericana: 1979
  - Intercontinental Cup: 1979
  - Supercopa Sudamericana: 1990
  - Recopa Sudamericana: 1990
