= Remigio Fernández =

Paraguayan footballer (born 1965)

Remigio Fernández Amarilla (born 1 October 1965) is a Paraguayan football manager and former player who played as a defender for clubs of Paraguay and Chile.

== Career ==
- Olimpia 1980–1991
- Deportes Antofagasta 1992–1993
- Olimpia 1994–1995

== Honours ==
Olimpia

- Paraguayan Primera División 1980, 1981, 1982, 1983, 1985, 1988, 1989, 1995
- Copa Libertadores: 1990
- Supercopa Sudamericana: 1990
- Recopa Sudamericana: 1991
