= Adriano Samaniego =

Paraguayan footballer (born 1963)

Personal information
- Full name: Adriano Samaniego Giménez
- Date of birth: 8 September 1963 (age 63)
- Place of birth: Luque, Paraguay
- Height: 1.80 m (5 ft 11 in)
- Position: Striker

Youth career
- Olimpia Asunción

Senior career*
Years	Team	Apps	(Gls)
1981–1985	Olimpia Asunción	111	(51)
1987–1989	Necaxa	45	(10)
1990	Olimpia Asunción	39	(26)
1991	Junior Barranquilla	33	(18)
1992	Olimpia Asunción	30	(14)
1993–1994	Junior Barranquilla	56	(23)
1995–1997	Olimpia Asunción	77	(26)
1998	Guaraní	20	(10)

International career
1985–1995	Paraguay	26	(7)
- * Club domestic league appearances and goals as of April 2008

Adriano Samaniego Giménez (born 8 September 1963) is a Paraguayan former football striker.

== Club ==
Samaniego started his football career in the youth divisions of Club Olimpia of Paraguay. His debut in the first team squad was in 1981. He played for Olimpia from 1981 to 1985, achieving the top scorer title of the Paraguayan League in 1985 and winning the national championship in 1981, 1982, 1983 and 1985. A serious injury kept him from playing the 1986 FIFA World Cup. After a brief stint in Mexico playing for Necaxa, he returned to Olimpia in 1990 to form the feared attacking trio of 1990 along with Raul Vicente Amarilla and Gabriel "El Loco" González, which led Olimpia to the Copa Libertadores title, Supercopa Sudamericana and Recopa of the same year. Samaniego was also the top scorer of the Copa Libertadores in 1990 with seven goals.

After his success with Olimpia, Samaniego played for Colombian side Junior de Barranquilla between 1991 and 1994, where he won the 1993 national championship, before returning again to Olimpia in 1995. Adriano Samaniego ended his career in 1998 playing for Club Guaraní.

== International ==
Samaniego made his international debut for the Paraguay national football team on 9 October 1985 in a friendly match against Chile (0-0). He obtained a total number of 26 international caps, scoring seven goals for the national side.

International Goals
#	Date	Venue	Opponent	Score	Result	Competition
??.	27 February 1991	Campo Grande, Brazil	Brazil	1–1	1–1	Friendly
??.	6 July 1995	Maldonado, Uruguay	Mexico	2–1	2–1	Copa América

== Honours ==
=== Club ===
- Olimpia
  - Paraguayan Primera División: 1981, 1982, 1983, 1985, 1995, 1997
  - Torneo República: 1992
  - Copa Libertadores: 1990
  - Supercopa Sudamericana: 1990
  - Recopa Sudamericana: 1990
- Junior Barranquilla
  - Colombian 1st division: 1993

=== Individual ===
- Olimpia
  - Top scorer Paraguayan Primera División: 1985 (19 goals)
  - Top scorer Copa Libertadores: 1990 (7 goals)
