= Silvio Suárez =

Paraguayan footballer (born 1969)

Personal information
- Full name: Silvio Suárez
- Date of birth: 5 January 1969 (age 57)
- Place of birth: Itacurubí del Rosario, Paraguay
- Position: Left-back

Youth career
- Olimpia

Senior career*
Years	Team	Apps	(Gls)
1990–1998	Olimpia	-	(-)
1998–2000	Talleres	37	(1)
2001–2002	12 de Octubre	-	(-)
2008	12 de Octubre (Pirayú)	-	(-)

International career
1991–1997	Paraguay	34	(0)
- * Club domestic league appearances and goals

Silvio Suárez (born 5 January 1969) is a former football defender from Paraguay. His most common position in defense was left-back.

== Career ==
=== Club ===
Suárez started his career in the youth divisions of Olimpia and eventually made his way to the first team where he won several national and international championships between 1990 and 1998. In 1998, he was signed by Argentine side Talleres de Córdoba where he was part of the team that won the 1999 Copa CONMEBOL, the only international tournament in the club's history. Suárez returned to Paraguay to play for 12 de Octubre of Itaugua and end his career. In 2008, he came out of retirement to play for 12 de Octubre of Pirayú in the Liga Pirayuense de Deportes. The team was eliminated as it did not pass the qualifying stage of the league and Suárez retired from football for good.

=== International ===
Suárez also played for the Paraguay national football team in the Copa América tournaments of 1991, 1993, 1995 and 1999. Suárez made his international debut for Paraguay on 27 February 1991 in a friendly match against Brazil (1–1) in Campo Grande. He obtained a total number of 34 international caps, scoring no goals for the national side.

== Honours ==
=== Club ===
- Olimpia
  - Paraguayan Primera División: 1993, 1995, 1997
  - Copa Libertadores: 1990
  - Supercopa Sudamericana: 1990
  - Recopa Sudamericana: 1990
- Talleres
  - Copa CONMEBOL: 1999
