= Fermín Balbuena =

Paraguayan footballer (born 1961)

Personal information
- Date of birth: 7 July 1961 (age 65)
- Place of birth: Asunción, Paraguay
- Height: 1.75 m (5 ft 9 in)
- Position: Midfielder

Senior career*
Years	Team	Apps	(Gls)
1985–1986	Nacional		
1986–1991	Olimpia		
1992–1993	Cerro Corá		
1993	Deportes Concepción		
1994–1995	Olimpia		

International career
1991	Paraguay	2	(0)
- * Club domestic league appearances and goals

Fermín Balbuena (born 7 July 1961) is a Paraguayan football manager and former player who played for clubs from Paraguay and Chile. He made two appearances for the Paraguay national team.

== Honours ==
Olimpia

- Paraguayan Primera División: 1988, 1989, 1995
- Copa Libertadores: 1990
- Supercopa Sudamericana: 1990
- Recopa Sudamericana: 1991
