= Raúl Amarilla (footballer, born 1960) =

Paraguayan footballer (born 1960)

Personal information
- Full name: Raúl Vicente Amarilla Vera
- Date of birth: 19 July 1960 (age 66)
- Place of birth: Luque, Paraguay
- Height: 1.89 m (6 ft 2 1/2 in)
- Position: Forward

Youth career
- Sportivo Luqueño

Senior career*
Years	Team	Apps	(Gls)
1978–1979	Sportivo Luqueño		
1980–1985	Zaragoza	126	(47)
1980–1981	→ Racing Santander (loan)	29	(9)
1985–1988	Barcelona	35	(8)
1988–1989	Olimpia		
1989	América		
1990–1993	Olimpia		
1993–1994	Yokohama Flügels	26	(15)

International career
1982–1983	Spain U21	2	(0)

Managerial career
- 2006–2007: Paraguay
- * Club domestic league appearances and goals

Raúl Vicente Amarilla (born 19 July 1960) is a Paraguayan retired footballer who played as a striker. Born in Paraguay, he represented Spain internationally with the under-21 team.

== Playing career ==
Amarilla made his debut in his hometown team, Sportivo Luqueño at the age of 17. Because of his scoring ability and great heading skills (he was fairly tall, 6 feet 3 inches) he soon moved to Spain and signed for Real Zaragoza. Before making his debut with Real Zaragoza, he was loaned to Racing de Santander for the 1980/81 season. Amarilla returned to Real Zaragoza where he gained success by leading the team in scoring in the 1982–83 season, finishing as the second best scorer in La Liga. Because of his success in the Spanish League, Amarilla was asked to play for the Spain national under-21 football team. He accepted the offer and this is why later in his career he was not able to play for the Paraguay national team. After several seasons with Real Zaragoza, Amarilla joined FC Barcelona between 1985 and 1988.

Amarilla returned to Paraguay in 1988 to play for Club Olimpia de Asunción. In 1989, while playing for Olimpia he was the top scorer in the Copa Libertadores of the same year with 10 goals. For the second half of 1989 he went on loan to the América de Mexico football team. Despite playing for a brief period, he established himself as a fan favorite by scoring 21 goals and eventually was chosen as one of the top 100 players in Club America's history.

He returned in 1990 to Paraguay to play again for Olimpia. In that year, he helped the team win the Copa Libertadores, the Supercopa and Recopa Sudamericana by forming the unforgettable feared attacking Olimpia trio along with Gabriel González and Adriano Samaniego. To top his great performance in the year 1990, he was voted South American Footballer of the Year.

After leaving Olimpia, he played 2 years in the J.League with Yokohama Flügels. On 1 January 1994, he scored twice in a 6–2 win over Kashima Antlers in the final of the Emperor's Cup.

At the age of 34, he returned to Paraguay and retired from professional football after a spell with Olimpia.

== Coaching career ==
A few years after retiring from professional football, Amarilla began coaching small teams in the Paraguayan league such as Club Sportivo San Lorenzo and Sportivo Luqueño where he achieved minor success. Afterwards, Amarilla was named the assistant coach of Anibal Ruiz for the Paraguay national team during the 2006 FIFA World Cup qualification and the 2006 World Cup. After Ruiz resigned from the Paraguay national team, Amarilla was named as the interim head coach by the Paraguayan Football Association until the start of 2007, where Gerardo Martino was appointed as the new manager. Amarilla currently works as the director of the youth divisions of Olimpia.

== Honours ==
=== Club ===
Season	Club	Title
1984–85	FC Barcelona	La Liga
1987–88	FC Barcelona	Copa del Rey
1988	Olimpia	Paraguay 1st Division
1990	Olimpia	Copa Libertadores
1990	Olimpia	Supercopa Sudamericana
1990	Olimpia	Recopa Sudamericana
1993	Olimpia	Paraguay 1st Division
1994	Yokohama Flügels	Emperor's Cup

=== Individual ===
- Paraguayan 1st Division top scorer in 1988
- Copa Libertadores top scorer in 1989
- South American Footballer of the Year in 1990

Preceded by Bebeto	South American Footballer of the Year; 1990	Succeeded by Oscar Ruggeri
