= Luis Monzón =

Paraguayan footballer (born 1970)

Personal information
- Full name: Luis Alberto Monzón León
- Date of birth: 26 May 1970 (age 56)
- Place of birth: Asunción, Paraguay
- Position: Midfielder

Youth career
- Olimpia Asunción

Senior career*
Years	Team	Apps	(Gls)
1987–1991	Olimpia Asunción	–	(–)
1991–1994	Cruz Azul	14	(2)
1995–1996	Olimpia Asunción	–	(–)
1996	Huracán	6	(1)
1997–1998	Olimpia Asunción	–	(–)
1998	Nacional Montevideo	–	(–)
1999–2001	Olimpia Asunción	–	(–)
2002–2003	12 de Octubre	–	(–)
2004	Nacional Asunción	–	(–)
2005	General Caballero ZC	–	(–)

International career
1991–1993	Paraguay	17	(4)
- * Club domestic league appearances and goals

Luis Alberto Monzón León (born 26 May 1970 in Asunción) is a retired football midfielder from Paraguay.

== Club career ==
Monzón started his career in the youth divisions of Olimpia and made his professional debut at the age of 16. He was a key player in the Olimpia team that won the Copa Libertadores in 1990, and throughout his years with the club, he won several national and international championships, which made him one of the squad's most emblematic players. He also played in Mexico for Cruz Azul, in Argentina for Club Atlético Huracán and a few Paraguayan teams before retiring.

== International career ==
Monzón made his international debut for the Paraguay national football team on 27 February 1991 in a friendly match against Brazil (1-1). He obtained a total number of 17 international caps, scoring four goals for the national side. Monzón also played for the Paraguay national football team in the Copa America tournaments of 1991 and 1993.

== Honours ==
=== Club ===
- Olimpia
  - Paraguayan Primera División: 1995, 1997, 1998, 1999, 2000
  - Copa Libertadores: 1990
  - Supercopa Sudamericana: 1990
  - Recopa Sudamericana: 1990
  - Jawaharlal Nehru Centenary Club Cup: 1990
- 12 de Octubre
  - Paraguayan Primera División: Torneo Clausura 2002
