= 1995 Copa Libertadores final stages =

The 1995 Copa Libertadores final stages were played from 26 April to 30 August 1995 and consisted of the round of 16 (or second stage), quarter-finals, semi-finals and the finals. A total of 16 teams competed in the final stages to decide the champions of the 1995 Copa Libertadores.

The final stages had a one-month break between the quarter-finals and semi-finals due to the 1995 Copa América held from 5 July to 23 July 1995.

== Qualified teams ==
The winners, runners-up and third placed teams of each of the five groups in the group stage advanced to the round of 16, alongside defending champions Vélez Sarsfield, who received a direct bye to this round.

Group	Winners	Runners-up	Third-placed teams
1	(Argentina) River Plate	(Uruguay) Peñarol	(Argentina) Independiente
2	(Paraguay) Cerro Porteño	(Paraguay) Olimpia	(Venezuela) Caracas
3	(Colombia) Millonarios	(Colombia) Atlético Nacional	(Chile) Universidad Católica
4	(Brazil) Palmeiras	(Brazil) Grêmio	(Ecuador) Emelec
5	(Peru) Sporting Cristal	(Bolivia) Bolívar	(Peru) Alianza Lima

=== Seeding ===
In the final stages, the teams were seeded according to the pre-established numbering they received according to the final position they occupied in their respective group. Numbers 1, 5, 9, 13 and 17 correspond to each group winners; numbers 2, 6, 10, 14 and 18 to runners-up; and 3, 7, 11, 15 and 19 to third placed teams.

Seed	Grp	Team	Pld	W	D	L	GF	GA	GD	Pts	Round of 16
1	1	(Argentina) River Plate	6	3	3	0	11	6	+5	12	Match A
2	1	(Uruguay) Peñarol	6	2	3	1	9	7	+2	9	Match F
3	1	(Argentina) Independiente	6	2	1	3	8	8	0	7	Match D
5	2	(Paraguay) Cerro Porteño	6	4	2	0	16	6	+10	14	Match B
6	2	(Paraguay) Olimpia	6	3	3	0	16	7	+9	12	Match G
7	2	(Venezuela) Caracas	6	2	0	4	8	18	−10	6	Match E
9	3	(Colombia) Millonarios	6	3	1	2	3	9	−6	10	Match C
10	3	(Colombia) Atlético Nacional	6	2	3	1	5	3	+2	9	Match F
11	3	(Chile) Universidad Católica	6	2	1	3	5	6	−1	7	Match A
13	4	(Brazil) Palmeiras	6	4	1	1	15	5	+10	13	Match D
14	4	(Brazil) Grêmio	6	3	2	1	12	7	+5	11	Match G
15	4	(Ecuador) Emelec	6	1	2	3	8	12	−4	5	Match B
17	5	(Peru) Sporting Cristal	6	3	3	0	15	4	+11	12	Match E
18	5	(Bolivia) Bolívar	6	2	3	1	8	5	+3	9	Match H
19	5	(Peru) Alianza Lima	6	1	2	3	10	11	−1	5	Match C

== Format ==
In the final stages, the 16 teams played a single-elimination tournament with the following rules:

- In the round of 16, quarter-finals, semi-finals and finals, each tie was played on a home-and-away two-legged basis. If tied on points after the two legs the goal difference would be applied. if still tied, extra time was not played, and a penalty shoot-out was used to determine the winners.
- In the event that the two Argentine teams from the group stage qualify for the round of 16, the lower-seeded team between these two would face defending champion Vélez Sarsfield in order to prevent three Argentine teams from reaching the quarter-finals.
- If two teams from the same national association reached the quarter-finals, they had to face each other, and those teams that had to face them formed another tie under the same conditions.
- If one or more games are settled in the quarter-finals between clubs belonging to the same national association, the Match S1 would correspond to the pair including the lower-seeding team. The following matches would be determined according to the same criteria.
- In all cases in which the order of legs could not be determined, the lower-seeding team had to host the first leg. Defending champions Vélez Sarsfield had to host the second leg in the round of 16.

The above criteria were established to ensure that the four semifinalists would be of different nationalities (Regulations Section III, Article 3).

== Bracket ==
The original bracket for the final stages was determined as follows:

Round	Matchups
Round of 16 (Second stage)	(Home team in the first leg are marked with (L)): Match A: Team seeded 1 vs. Team seeded 11 (L); Match B: Team seeded 5 vs. Team seeded 15 (L); Match C: Team seeded 9 vs. Team seeded 19 (L); Match D: Team seeded 13 vs. Team seeded 3 (L); Match E: Team seeded 17 vs. Team seeded 7 (L); Match F: Team seeded 2 vs. Team seeded 10 (L); Match G: Team seeded 14 vs. Team seeded 6 (L); Match H: Team seeded 18 (L) vs. Vélez Sarsfield (defending champions)
Quarter-finals	(Home team in the first leg are marked with (L)): Match S1: Winner A vs. Winner B (L); Match S2: Winner C vs. Winner D (L); Match S3: Winner E vs. Winner F (L); Match S4: Winner G (L) vs. Winner H
Semi-finals	(Home team in the first leg are marked with (L)): Match F1: Winner S1 vs. Winner S2 (L); Match F2: Winner S3 vs. Winner S4 (L)
Finals	(Home team in the first leg are marked with (L)): Winner F1 vs. Winner F2 (L)

Per regulations, the original bracket had the following modifications:

- In the round of 16, Independiente and Bolívar swapped positions. Independiente had to faced Vélez Sarsfield in order to avoid three possible Argentine teams in the quarter-finals.
- In quarter-finals, the two Argentine teams, the two Colombian teams and the two Brazilians teams had to face each other, and the order of the ties was rearranged according to the regulations.

Round of 16
15	(Ecuador) Emelec (p)	2	0	2 (5)
5	(Paraguay) Cerro Porteño	0	2	2 (4)
7	(Venezuela) Caracas	2	3	5
17	(Peru) Sporting Cristal	2	6	8
6	(Paraguay) Olimpia	0	0	0
14	(Brazil) Grêmio	3	2	5
18	(Bolivia) Bolívar	1	0	1
13	(Brazil) Palmeiras	0	3	3
10	(Colombia) Atlético Nacional	3	3	6
2	(Uruguay) Peñarol	1	1	2
19	(Peru) Alianza Lima	1	0	1
9	(Colombia) Millonarios	1	2	3
11	(Chile) Universidad Católica	2	1	3
1	(Argentina) River Plate	1	3	4
3	(Argentina) Independiente	0	2	2
–	(Argentina) Vélez Sarsfield	3	2	5

Quarter-finals
(Ecuador) Emelec	3	1	4
(Peru) Sporting Cristal	1	1	2
(Brazil) Grêmio	5	1	6
(Brazil) Palmeiras	0	5	5
(Colombia) Atlético Nacional	2	1	3
(Colombia) Millonarios	1	1	2
(Argentina) River Plate (p)	1	0	1 (5)
(Argentina) Vélez Sarsfield	1	0	1 (3)

Semi-finals
(Ecuador) Emelec	0	0	0
(Brazil) Grêmio	0	2	2
(Colombia) Atlético Nacional (p)	1	0	1 (8)
(Argentina) River Plate	0	1	1 (7)

Finals
(Brazil) Grêmio	3	1	4
(Colombia) Atlético Nacional	1	1	2

== Round of 16 ==
The first legs were played on 25–27 April, and the second legs were played on 3 and 4 May 1995.

Team 1	Agg.	Team 2	1st leg	2nd leg
Universidad Católica (Chile)	3–4	(Argentina) River Plate	2–1	1–3
Emelec (Ecuador)	2–2 (5–4 p)	(Paraguay) Cerro Porteño	2–0	0–2
Alianza Lima (Peru)	1–3	(Colombia) Millonarios	1–1	0–2
Bolívar (Bolivia)	1–3	(Brazil) Palmeiras	1–0	0–3
Caracas (Venezuela)	5–8	(Peru) Sporting Cristal	2–2	3–6
Atlético Nacional (Colombia)	6–2	(Uruguay) Peñarol	3–1	3–1
Olimpia (Paraguay)	0–5	(Brazil) Grêmio	0–3	0–2
Independiente (Argentina)	2–5	(Argentina) Vélez Sarsfield	0–3	2–2

=== Match A ===
27 April 1995
--:-- UTC−4

Universidad Católica (Chile)	2–1	(Argentina) River Plate
Acosta 42'; Lunari 88'	Report	Gallardo 51'

Estadio San Carlos de Apoquindo, Santiago
Attendance: 16,000
Referee: Julio Matto (Uruguay)

3 May 1995
--:-- UTC−3

River Plate (Argentina)	3–1	(Chile) Universidad Católica
Berti 12'; Gallardo 26'; Francescoli 38'	Report	Ardiman 24'

Estadio Monumental, Buenos Aires
Attendance: 50,000
Referee: Jorge Nieves (Uruguay)

River Plate won 4–3 on aggregate and advanced to the quarter-finals (Match S1).

=== Match B ===
26 April 1995
--:-- UTC−5

Emelec (Ecuador)	2–0	(Paraguay) Cerro Porteño
Verduga 57'; E. Hurtado 63'	Report

Estadio Modelo Alberto Spencer Herrera, Guayaquil
Attendance: 40,000
Referee: Carlos Robles (Chile)

3 May 1995
--:-- UTC−3

Cerro Porteño (Paraguay)	2–0	(Ecuador) Emelec
Villamayor 28'; Ferreira 55'	Report
Penalties
Villamayor (penalty scored); Torales (penalty scored); Delvalle (penalty scored); Gamarra (penalty scored); Ferreira (penalty missed)	4–5	(penalty scored) Vidal González; (penalty scored) Ron; (penalty scored) Poroso; (penalty scored) Fajardo; (penalty scored) I. Hurtado

Estadio General Pablo Rojas, Asunción
Attendance: 20,000
Referee: João Paulo Araújo (Brazil)

Tied 2–2 on aggregate, Emelec won on penalties and advanced to the quarter-finals (Match S1).

=== Match C ===
26 April 1995
--:-- UTC−5

Alianza Lima (Peru)	1–1	(Colombia) Millonarios
Rodríguez 19'	Report	Mosquera 42'

Estadio Alejandro Villanueva, Lima
Attendance: 26,500
Referee: Pablo Peña (Bolivia)

3 May 1995
--:-- UTC−5

Millonarios (Colombia)	2–0	(Peru) Alianza Lima
Rendón 39'; López 41'	Report

Estadio El Campín, Bogotá
Attendance: 50,000
Referee: Ángel Guevara (Ecuador)

Millonarios won 3–1 on aggregate and advanced to the quarter-finals (Match S2).

=== Match D ===
26 April 1995
--:-- UTC−4

Bolívar (Bolivia)	1–0	(Brazil) Palmeiras
Mercado 48'	Report

Estadio Hernando Siles, La Paz
Attendance: 33,624
Referee: Epifanio González (Paraguay)

3 May 1995
--:-- UTC−3

Palmeiras (Brazil)	3–0	(Bolivia) Bolívar
Válber 1', 90'; Rivaldo 55'	Report

Estádio Palestra Itália, São Paulo
Attendance: 21,431
Referee: Eduardo Dluzniewski (Uruguay)

Palmeiras won 3–1 on aggregate and advanced to the quarter-finals (Match S2).

=== Match E ===
26 April 1995
--:-- UTC−4

Caracas (Venezuela)	2–2	(Peru) Sporting Cristal
González 12' (pen.); Díaz 90'	Report	Solano 10' (pen.); Julinho 59'

Estadio Brígido Iriarte, Caracas
Attendance: 12,000
Referee: José Torres Cadena (Colombia)

4 May 1995
--:-- UTC−5

Sporting Cristal (Peru)	6–3	(Venezuela) Caracas
Maestri 10'; Julinho 48', 60'; Solano 56'; Jor. Soto 71'; Palacios 76'	Report	Salisú 12', 79'; Díaz 29'

Estadio Nacional, Lima
Referee: Salvador Imperatore (Chile)

Sporting Cristal won 8–5 on aggregate and advanced to the quarter-finals (Match S3).

=== Match F ===
26 April 1995
--:-- UTC−5

Atlético Nacional (Colombia)	3–1	(Uruguay) Peñarol
García 6'; Aristizábal 18', 32'	Report	Otero 8'

Estadio Atanasio Girardot, Medellín
Attendance: 38,000
Referee: Francisco Lamolina (Argentina)

3 May 1995
--:-- UTC−3

Peñarol (Uruguay)	1–3	(Colombia) Atlético Nacional
Silva 27'	Report	Aristizábal 12'; Gaviria 61'; Osorio 85'

Estadio Centenario, Montevideo
Attendance: 31,000
Referee: Cláudio Vinícius Cerdeira (Brazil)

Atlético Nacional won 6–2 on aggregate and advanced to the quarter-finals (Match S3).

=== Match G ===
25 April 1995
--:-- UTC−3

Olimpia (Paraguay)	0–3	(Brazil) Grêmio
	Report	Dinho 28'; Jardel 56'; Paulo Nunes 63'

Estadio Defensores del Chaco, Asunción
Attendance: 15,000
Referee: Alberto Tejada (Peru)

3 May 1995
--:-- UTC−3

Grêmio (Brazil)	2–0	(Paraguay) Olimpia
Jardel 17'; Adilson Batista 55'	Report

Estádio Olímpico Monumental, Porto Alegre
Attendance: 28,730
Referee: Horacio Elizondo (Argentina)

Grêmio won 5–0 on aggregate and advanced to the quarter-finals (Match S4).

=== Match H ===
26 April 1995
--:-- UTC−3

Independiente (Argentina)	0–3	(Argentina) Vélez Sarsfield
	Report	Flores 45', 50'; Bassedas 56'

La Doble Visera de Cemento, Avellaneda
Attendance: 18,000
Referee: Horacio Elizondo (Argentina)

3 May 1995
--:-- UTC−3

Vélez Sarsfield (Argentina)	2–2	(Argentina) Independiente
Sánchez 6'; Flores 36'	Report	Mazzoni 21'; Rotchen 60'

Estadio José Amalfitani, Buenos Aires
Attendance: 18,000
Referee: Luis Oliveto (Argentina)

Vélez Sarsfield won 5–2 on aggregate and advanced to the quarter-finals (Match S4).

== Quarter-finals ==
The first legs were played on 26 July, and the second legs were played on 2 August 1995.

Team 1	Agg.	Team 2	1st leg	2nd leg
River Plate (Argentina)	1–1 (5–3 p)	(Argentina) Vélez Sarsfield	1–1	0–0
Atlético Nacional (Colombia)	6–2	(Colombia) Millonarios	3–1	3–1
Grêmio (Brazil)	6–5	(Brazil) Palmeiras	5–0	1–5
Emelec (Ecuador)	4–2	(Peru) Sporting Cristal	3–1	1–1

=== Match S1 ===
26 July 1995
--:-- UTC−3

River Plate (Argentina)	1–1	(Argentina) Vélez Sarsfield
Amato 85'	Report	Zandoná 12'

Estadio Monumental, Buenos Aires
Attendance: 16,000
Referee: Javier Castrilli (Argentina)

2 August 1995
--:-- UTC−3

Vélez Sarsfield (Argentina)	0–0	(Argentina) River Plate
	Report
Penalties
Trotta (penalty scored); Chilavert (penalty scored); Zandoná (penalty missed); Herrera (penalty scored)	3–5	(penalty scored) Gallardo; (penalty scored) Díaz; (penalty scored) Ortega; (penalty scored) Amato; (penalty scored) Cedrés

Estadio José Amalfitani, Buenos Aires
Attendance: 25,000
Referee: Francisco Lamolina (Argentina)

Tied 1–1 on aggregate, River Plate won on penalties and advanced to the semi-finals (Match F1).

=== Match S2 ===
26 July 1995
--:-- UTC−5

Atlético Nacional (Colombia)	2–1	(Colombia) Millonarios
Arango 7'; Aristizábal 77'	Report	Iguarán 88'

Estadio Atanasio Girardot, Medellín
Attendance: 35,000
Referee: Ángel Guevara (Ecuador)

2 August 1995
--:-- UTC−5

Millonarios (Colombia)	1–1	(Colombia) Atlético Nacional
León 38'	Report	Serna 36' (pen.)

Estadio El Campín, Bogotá
Attendance: 55,000
Referee: Fernando Chapell (Peru)

Atlético Nacional won 3–2 on aggregate and advanced to the semi-finals (Match F1).

=== Match S3 ===
26 July 1995
--:-- UTC−3

Grêmio (Brazil)	5–0	(Brazil) Palmeiras
Arce 41'; Arílson 52'; Jardel 64', 81', 90'	Report

Estádio Olímpico Monumental, Porto Alegre
Attendance: 16,136
Referee: Cláudio Vinícius Cerdeira (Brazil)

2 August 1995
--:-- UTC−3

Palmeiras (Brazil)	5–1	(Brazil) Grêmio
Cafu 29', 84'; Amaral 38'; Paulo Isidoro 58'; Mancuso 69' (pen.)	Report	Jardel 16'

Estádio Palestra Itália, São Paulo
Attendance: 7,615
Referee: Antônio Pereira (Brazil)

Grêmio won 6–5 on aggregate and advanced to the semi-finals (Match F2).

=== Match S4 ===
26 July 1995
--:-- UTC−5

Emelec (Ecuador)	3–1	(Peru) Sporting Cristal
E. Hurtado 21', 53'; Vidal González 36'	Report	Astegiano 10'

Estadio Monumental Isidro Romero Carbo, Guayaquil
Attendance: 30,000
Referee: Wilson Souza Mendonça (Brazil)

2 August 1995
--:-- UTC−5

Sporting Cristal (Peru)	1–1	(Ecuador) Emelec
Pinillos 78'	Report	Tenorio 9'

Estadio Alejandro Villanueva, Lima
Attendance: 25,000
Referee: Jorge Nieves (Uruguay)

Emelec won 4–2 on aggregate and advanced to the semi-finals (Match F2).

== Semi-finals ==
The first legs were played on 9 August, and the second legs were played on 16 August 1995.

Team 1	Agg.	Team 2	1st leg	2nd leg
Atlético Nacional (Colombia)	1–1 (8–7 p)	(Argentina) River Plate	1–0	0–1
Emelec (Ecuador)	0–2	(Brazil) Grêmio	0–0	0–2

=== Match F1 ===
9 August 1995
--:-- UTC−5

Atlético Nacional (Colombia)	1–0	(Argentina) River Plate
Higuita 55'	Report

Estadio Atanasio Girardot, Medellín
Attendance: 52,000
Referee: Salvador Imperatore (Chile)

16 August 1995
--:-- UTC−3

River Plate (Argentina)	1–0	(Colombia) Atlético Nacional
Amato 48'	Report
Penalties
Gallardo (penalty scored); Díaz (penalty scored); Ortega (penalty scored); Amato (penalty scored); Cedrés (penalty scored); Ayala (penalty scored); Astrada (penalty scored); Almeyda (penalty missed)	7–8	(penalty scored) Higuita; (penalty scored) Pabón; (penalty scored) Gutiérrez; (penalty scored) Mosquera; (penalty scored) Serna; (penalty scored) García; (penalty scored) Santa; (penalty scored) Foronda

Estadio Monumental, Buenos Aires
Attendance: 60,000
Referee: Jorge Nieves (Uruguay)

Tied 1–1 on aggregate, Atlético Nacional won on penalties and advanced to the finals.

=== Match F2 ===
9 August 1995
--:-- UTC−5

Emelec (Ecuador)	0–0	(Brazil) Grêmio
	Report

Estadio Modelo, Guayaquil
Attendance: 35,000
Referee: Óscar Ruiz (Colombia)

16 August 1995
--:-- UTC−3

Grêmio (Brazil)	2–0	(Ecuador) Emelec
Paulo Nunes 30'; Jardel 41'	Report

Estádio Olímpico Monumental, Porto Alegre
Attendance: 30,743
Referee: Félix Benegas (Paraguay)

Grêmio won 2–0 on aggregate and advanced to the finals.

== Finals ==
The first leg was played on 23 August, and the second leg was played on 30 August 1995.

23 August 1995
First leg

Grêmio (Brazil)	3–1	(Colombia) Atlético Nacional
Marulanda 35' (o.g.); Jardel 43'; Paulo Nunes 55'		Ángel 72'

Estádio Olímpico, Porto Alegre
Attendance: 54,200
Referee: Alfredo Rodas (Ecuador)

30 August 1995
Second leg

Atlético Nacional (Colombia)	1–1	(Brazil) Grêmio
Aristizábal 12'		Dinho 85'

Estadio Atanasio Girardot, Medellín
Attendance: 49,000
Referee: Salvador Imperatore (Chile)

Grêmio won 4–2 on aggregate.
