= 1995 Copa Libertadores group stage =

The 1995 Copa Libertadores group stage or 1995 Copa Libertadores first stage was played from 8 February to 20 April 1995. A total of 20 teams competed in the group stage to decide 15 places in the final stages of the 1995 Copa Libertadores, where they joined defending champions Vélez Sarsfield.

== Groups composition ==
Same as previous editions, the 20 participating teams were divided into 5 groups of 4, which consisted of two teams from one national association and two teams from another. The draw of the tournament was held on 15 November 1994 in Santiago, Chile and the paired associations for this edition were as follows:

- Group 1: Argentina and Uruguay
- Group 2: Paraguay and Venezuela
- Group 3: Colombia and Chile
- Group 4: Brazil and Ecuador
- Group 5: Bolivia and Peru

== Format ==
In the group stage, each group was played on a home-and-away round-robin basis. The teams were ranked according to the following criteria: 1. Points (3 points for a win, 1 point for a draw, and 0 points for a loss); 2. Goal difference; 3. Goals scored; 4. Away goals scored; 5. Drawing of lots.

If two teams from the same national association tie on points, the above criteria would not apply and their final positions would be determined in an extra match to be played at a neutral venue within their own country. Winners of this match qualified for the round of 16; in the event of a draw, the team with the best goal difference in the group would have qualified.

The winners, runners-up and third placed teams of each group advanced to the round of 16 of the final stages.

== Groups ==
=== Group 1 ===
Pos	Team	Pld	W	D	L	GF	GA	GD	Pts	Qualification	RIV	PEÑ	IND	CRR
1	(Argentina) River Plate	6	3	3	0	11	6	+5	12	Round of 16	—	1–1	2–0	5–0
2	(Uruguay) Peñarol	6	2	3	1	9	7	+2	9	Round of 16	1–1	—	1–2	3–3
3	(Argentina) Independiente	6	2	1	3	8	8	0	7	Round of 16	1–1	0–1	—	2–1
4	(Uruguay) Cerro	6	1	1	4	5	12	−7	4		0–1	0–2	1–0	—

19 February 1995
--:-- UTC−3

Independiente (Argentina)	1–1	(Argentina) River Plate
Burruchaga 15'	Report	Rotchen 50' (o.g.)

La Doble Visera de Cemento, Avellaneda
Attendance: 40,000
Referee: Javier Castrilli (Argentina)
19 February 1995
--:-- UTC−3

Peñarol (Uruguay)	3–3	(Uruguay) Cerro
Bengoechea 60', 90'; Torales 70' (o.g.)	Report	Homann 35', 67'; Acosta 40'

Estadio Centenario, Montevideo
Attendance: 25,000
Referee: José da Rosa (Uruguay)

22 February 1995
--:-- UTC−3

Peñarol (Uruguay)	1–2	(Argentina) Independiente
Rodríguez 46'	Report	Mazzoni 57'; Burruchaga 63' (pen.)

Estadio Centenario, Montevideo
Attendance: 28,000
Referee: Antônio Pereira (Brazil)
23 February 1995
--:-- UTC−3

Cerro (Uruguay)	0–1	(Argentina) River Plate
	Report	Berti 67'

Estadio Luis Tróccoli, Montevideo
Attendance: 12,000
Referee: Carlos Pimentel (Brazil)

8 March 1995
--:-- UTC−3

Peñarol (Uruguay)	1–1	(Argentina) River Plate
Otero 68'	Report	Francescoli 83'

Estadio Centenario, Montevideo
Attendance: 35,000
Referee: Alberto Tejada (Peru)
9 March 1995
--:-- UTC−3

Cerro (Uruguay)	1–0	(Argentina) Independiente
Cabrera 12'	Report

Estadio Luis Tróccoli, Montevideo
Attendance: 10,000
Referee: Antonio Arnao (Peru)

15 March 1995
--:-- UTC−3

Cerro (Uruguay)	0–2	(Uruguay) Peñarol
	Report	Silva 66'; Magallanes 76'

Estadio Luis Tróccoli, Montevideo
Attendance: 20,000
Referee: Julio Matto (Uruguay)
29 March 1995
--:-- UTC−3

River Plate (Argentina)	2–0	(Argentina) Independiente
Berti 19'; Díaz 54'	Report

Estadio Monumental, Buenos Aires
Attendance: 20,000
Referee: Roberto Ruscio (Argentina)

13 April 1995
--:-- UTC−3

River Plate (Argentina)	5–0	(Uruguay) Cerro
Francéscoli 15'; Almeyda 25'; Ortega 56'; Crespo 80', 87'	Report

Estadio Monumental, Buenos Aires
Attendance: 25,000
Referee: Eduardo Gamboa (Chile)
14 April 1995
--:-- UTC−3

Independiente (Argentina)	0–1	(Uruguay) Peñarol
	Report	Magallanes 9'

La Doble Visera de Cemento, Avellaneda
Attendance: 38,000
Referee: Salvador Imperatore (Chile)

19 April 1995
--:-- UTC−3

River Plate (Argentina)	1–1	(Uruguay) Peñarol
Ayala 63'	Report	Magallanes 78'

Estadio Monumental, Buenos Aires
Attendance: 12,000
Referee: João Paulo Araújo (Brazil)
20 April 1995
--:-- UTC−3

Independiente (Argentina)	2–1	(Uruguay) Cerro
Usuriaga 34'; Ramírez 61'	Report	Almada 19'

La Doble Visera de Cemento, Avellaneda
Attendance: 18,000
Referee: Cláudio Vinícius Cerdeira (Brazil)

=== Group 2 ===
Pos	Team	Pld	W	D	L	GF	GA	GD	Pts	Qualification	CCP	OLI	CAR	TRU
1	(Paraguay) Cerro Porteño	6	4	2	0	16	6	+10	14	Round of 16	—	2–2	2–1	3–1
2	(Paraguay) Olimpia	6	3	3	0	16	7	+9	12	Round of 16	1–1	—	5–0	4–1
3	(Venezuela) Caracas	6	2	0	4	8	18	−10	6	Round of 16	0–6	1–2	—	3–2
4	(Venezuela) Trujillanos	6	0	1	5	8	17	−9	1		1–2	2–2	1–3	—

15 February 1995
--:-- UTC−3

Olimpia (Paraguay)	1–1	(Paraguay) Cerro Porteño
Samaniego 6'	Report	Villamayor 43'

Estadio Defensores del Chaco, Asunción
Attendance: 25,000
Referee: Félix Benegas (Paraguay)
15 February 1995
--:-- UTC−4

Trujillanos (Venezuela)	1–3	(Venezuela) Caracas
Torres 22'	Report	Díaz 23', 69'; Salisu 65'

Estadio José Alberto Pérez, Valera
Attendance: 10,000
Referee: Raúl Antonio Pérez (Venezuela)

21 February 1995
--:-- UTC−3

Olimpia (Paraguay)	5–0	(Venezuela) Caracas
Báez 12', 34'; Esteche 60'; Samaniego 62'; Hezzel 67' (o.g.)	Report

Estadio Defensores del Chaco, Asunción
Attendance: 12,000
Referee: Roberto Ruscio (Argentina)
24 February 1995
--:-- UTC−3

Cerro Porteño (Paraguay)	2–1	(Venezuela) Caracas
Ferreira 44'; Gamarra 88'	Report	Salisu 52'

Estadio Defensores del Chaco, Asunción
Attendance: 15,000
Referee: Horacio Elizondo (Argentina)

28 February 1995
--:-- UTC−4

Trujillanos (Venezuela)	2–2	(Paraguay) Olimpia
Rengifo 76'; Ibarguen 89'	Report	Samaniego 48'; Báez 73'

Estadio José Alberto Pérez, Valera
Attendance: 8,000
Referee: Armando Pérez (Colombia)
3 March 1995
--:-- UTC−4

Caracas (Venezuela)	1–2	(Paraguay) Olimpia
Díaz 55'	Report	Suárez 10'; Báez 16'

Estadio Brígido Iriarte, Caracas
Attendance: 10,000
Referee: José Torres Cadena (Colombia)

21 March 1995
--:-- UTC−3

Cerro Porteño (Paraguay)	2–2	(Paraguay) Olimpia
Villamayor 33'; Gamarra 90' (pen.)	Report	Esteche 28'; Samaniego 68'

Estadio Defensores del Chaco, Asunción
Attendance: 25,000
Referee: Salvador Imperatore (Chile)
22 March 1995
--:-- UTC−4

Caracas (Venezuela)	3–2	(Venezuela) Trujillanos
Díaz 6'; Salisu 61', 85'	Report	Robson 41'; Durán 89'

Estadio Brígido Iriarte, Caracas
Attendance: 10,000
Referee: Giovanni Perluzzo (Venezuela)

28 March 1995
--:-- UTC−4

Trujillanos (Venezuela)	1–2	(Paraguay) Cerro Porteño
Robson 55'	Report	Ferreira 17'; Delvalle 40'

Estadio José Alberto Pérez, Valera
Attendance: 15,000
Referee: Roger Zambrano (Ecuador)
31 March 1995
--:-- UTC−4

Caracas (Venezuela)	0–6	(Paraguay) Cerro Porteño
	Report	Núñez 15', 27', 64'; Torales 80', 85', 89'

Estadio Brígido Iriarte, Caracas
Attendance: 12,000
Referee: Alfredo de JesÚs Rodas (Ecuador)

4 April 1995
--:-- UTC−3

Olimpia (Paraguay)	4–1	(Venezuela) Trujillanos
Valbuena 3' (o.g.); Báez 30', 63', 87'	Report	Robson 69'

Estadio Defensores del Chaco, Asunción
Attendance: 2,500
Referee: Pablo Peña (Bolivia)
7 April 1995
--:-- UTC−3

Cerro Porteño (Paraguay)	3–1	(Venezuela) Trujillanos
Delvalle 18'; Cabañas 47'; Gamarra 79'	Report	Robson 81'

Estadio General Pablo Rojas, Asunción
Referee: René Ortubé (Bolivia)

=== Group 3 ===
Pos	Team	Pld	W	D	L	GF	GA	GD	Pts	Qualification	MIL	ATN	UCA	UCH
1	(Colombia) Millonarios	6	3	1	2	11	8	+3	10	Round of 16	—	2–0	5–1	1–0
2	(Colombia) Atlético Nacional	6	2	3	1	5	4	+1	9	Round of 16	0–0	—	3–1	1–0
3	(Chile) Universidad Católica	6	2	1	3	10	14	−4	7 (Note: Play-off match: Universidad Católica 4–1 Universidad de Chile.)	Round of 16	4–1	1–1	—	2–0
4	Universidad de Chile	6	2	1	3	7	7	0	7		3–2	0–0	4–1	—

Notes:
10 February 1995
--:-- UTC−3

Universidad de Chile	4–1	(Chile) Universidad Católica
Salas 44', 60', 80'; Goldberg 82'	Report	Acosta 4'

Estadio Nacional Julio Martínez Prádanos, Santiago
Referee: Eduardo Gamboa (Chile)
14 February 1995
--:-- UTC−5

Atlético Nacional (Colombia)	0–0	(Colombia) Millonarios
	Report

Estadio Atanasio Girardot, Medellín
Attendance: 35,000
Referee: José Torres Cadena (Colombia)

21 February 1995
--:-- UTC−5

Millonarios (Colombia)	5–1	(Chile) Universidad Católica
Rendón 9'; Domínguez 30'; Iguarán 41'; León 51'; Mosquera 61'	Report	Acosta 64'

Estadio El Campín, Bogotá
Attendance: 40,000
Referee: Luis Seminario (Peru)
24 February 1995
--:-- UTC−5

Atlético Nacional (Colombia)	3–1	(Chile) Universidad Católica
Ángel 13'; Gaviria 31'; Aristizábal 40'	Report	Vázquez 73'

Estadio Atanasio Girardot, Medellín
Attendance: 28,000
Referee: Alberto Tejada (Peru)

7 March 1995
--:-- UTC−5

Millonarios (Colombia)	1–0	Universidad de Chile
Domínguez 61'	Report

Estadio El Campín, Bogotá
Attendance: 42,000
Referee: Roger Zambrano (Ecuador)
10 March 1995
--:-- UTC−5

Atlético Nacional (Colombia)	1–0	Universidad de Chile
Ángel 86'	Report

Estadio Atanasio Girardot, Medellín
Attendance: 35,000
Referee: Alfredo de Jesús Rodas (Peru)

15 March 1995
--:-- UTC−4

Universidad Católica (Chile)	2–0	Universidad de Chile
Acosta 18'; Gorosito 85'	Report

Estadio Nacional Julio Martínez Prádanos, Santiago
Attendance: 40,000
Referee: Óscar Ruiz (Colombia)
15 March 1995
--:-- UTC−5

Millonarios (Colombia)	2–0	(Colombia) Atlético Nacional
León 28'; Rendón 71'	Report

Estadio El Campín, Bogotá
Attendance: 55,000
Referee: Salvador Imperatore (Chile)

21 March 1995
--:-- UTC−4

Universidad Católica (Chile)	4–1	(Colombia) Millonarios
Acosta 15'; Rozental 17'; López 28'; Lunari 86'	Report	León 22'

Estadio San Carlos de Apoquindo, Santiago
Attendance: 18,000
Referee: Francisco Lamolina (Argentina)
24 March 1995
--:-- UTC−4

Universidad de Chile	3–2	(Colombia) Millonarios
Salas 28', 68'; Goldberg 32'	Report	León 37'; Díaz 89'

Estadio Nacional Julio Martínez Prádanos, Santiago
Attendance: 35,000
Referee: Luis Oliveto (Argentina)

4 April 1995
--:-- UTC−4

Universidad Católica (Chile)	1–1	(Colombia) Atlético Nacional
Rozental 37'	Report	Aristizábal 44'

Estadio San Carlos de Apoquindo, Santiago
Attendance: 20,000
Referee: Ernesto Filippi (Uruguay)
7 April 1995
--:-- UTC−4

Universidad de Chile	0–0	(Colombia) Atlético Nacional
	Report

Estadio Nacional Julio Martínez Prádanos, Santiago
Attendance: 40,000
Referee: Jorge Nieves (Uruguay)

==== Play-off match ====
As the Chilean teams were tied 7–7 on points, a play-off was required to determine the third and fourth place.

12 April 1995
--:-- UTC−4

Universidad Católica (Chile)	4–1	Universidad de Chile
Ardiman 11'; Acosta 39', 88'; Gorosito 68'	Report	Mardones 55'

Estadio Nacional Julio Martínez Prádanos, Santiago
Referee: Mario Sánchez (Chile)

=== Group 4 ===
Pos	Team	Pld	W	D	L	GF	GA	GD	Pts	Qualification	PAL	GRE	EME	ELN
1	(Brazil) Palmeiras	6	4	1	1	15	5	+10	13	Round of 16	—	3–2	2–1	7–0
2	(Brazil) Grêmio	6	3	2	1	12	7	+5	11	Round of 16	0–0	—	4–1	2–0
3	(Ecuador) Emelec	6	1	2	3	8	12	−4	5	Round of 16	1–3	2–2	—	1–1
4	(Ecuador) El Nacional	6	1	1	4	3	14	−11	4		1–0	1–2	0–2	—

21 February 1995
--:-- UTC−3

Palmeiras (Brazil)	3–2	(Brazil) Grêmio
Roberto Carlos 18'; Rivaldo 57'; Edmundo 68'	Report	Jardel 37'; Goiano 59'

Estádio Palestra Itália, São Paulo
Attendance: 8,424
Referee: Cláudio Vinícius Cerdeira (Brazil)
22 February 1995
--:-- UTC−5

Emelec (Ecuador)	1–1	(Ecuador) El Nacional
Ron 34'	Report	Vernaza 87'

Estadio George Capwell, Guayaquil
Attendance: 30,000
Referee: Ángel Guevara (Ecuador)

7 March 1995
--:-- UTC−5

El Nacional (Ecuador)	1–0	(Brazil) Palmeiras
Arroyo 85' (pen.)	Report

Estadio Olímpico Atahualpa, Quito
Attendance: 40,000
Referee: Felipe Russi (Colombia)
10 March 1995
--:-- UTC−5

Emelec (Ecuador)	1–3	(Brazil) Palmeiras
Vidal González 51'	Report	Roberto Carlos 31', 79'; Rivaldo 57'

Estadio George Capwell, Guayaquil
Attendance: 38,000
Referee: José Torres Cadena (Colombia)

14 March 1995
--:-- UTC−5

Emelec (Ecuador)	2–2	(Brazil) Grêmio
Fajardo 34'; E. Hurtado 69'	Report	Paulo Nunes 55'; Jardel 70'

Estadio George Capwell, Guayaquil
Attendance: 35,000
Referee: José da Rosa (Uruguay)
17 March 1995
--:-- UTC−5

El Nacional (Ecuador)	1–2	(Brazil) Grêmio
Vernaza 50'	Report	Arce 45', 90' (pen.)

Estadio Olímpico Atahualpa, Quito
Attendance: 40,000
Referee: Daniel Bello (Uruguay)

22 March 1995
--:-- UTC−3

Grêmio (Brazil)	0–0	(Brazil) Palmeiras
	Report

Estádio Olímpico Monumental, Porto Alegre
Attendance: 49,610
Referee: Dalmo Bozzano (Brazil)
22 March 1995
--:-- UTC−5

El Nacional (Ecuador)	0–2	(Ecuador) Emelec
	Report	Capurro 85'; Fernández 88'

Estadio Olímpico Atahualpa, Quito
Attendance: 15,000
Referee: Alfredo de Jesús Rodas (Ecuador)

28 March 1995
--:-- UTC−3

Palmeiras (Brazil)	2–1	(Ecuador) Emelec
Edmundo 42', 47' (pen.)	Report	E. Hurtado 81'

Estádio Palestra Itália, São Paulo
Attendance: 13,994
Referee: Julio Matto (Uruguay)
31 March 1995
--:-- UTC−3

Grêmio (Brazil)	4–1	(Ecuador) Emelec
Jardel 3'; Luciano Dias 29'; Paulo Nunes 38'; Magno 76'	Report	Vidal González 17'

Estádio Olímpico Monumental, Porto Alegre
Attendance: 16,051
Referee: Eduardo Dluzniewski (Uruguay)

4 April 1995
--:-- UTC−3

Palmeiras (Brazil)	7–0	(Ecuador) El Nacional
Edmundo 13', 37'; Rivaldo 30', 85'; Válber 34', 39'; Paulo Isidoro 70'	Report

Estádio Palestra Itália, São Paulo
Attendance: 16,930
Referee: Félix Benegas (Paraguay)
7 April 1995
--:-- UTC−3

Grêmio (Brazil)	2–0	(Ecuador) El Nacional
Jardel 71'; Magno 84'	Report

Estádio Olímpico Monumental, Porto Alegre
Attendance: 4,764
Referee: Epifanio González (Paraguay)

=== Group 5 ===
Pos	Team	Pld	W	D	L	GF	GA	GD	Pts	Qualification	SCR	BOL	ALI	WIL
1	(Peru) Sporting Cristal	6	3	3	0	15	4	+11	12	Round of 16	—	1–0	3–0	7–0
2	(Bolivia) Bolívar	6	2	3	1	8	5	+3	9	Round of 16	1–1	—	3–1	2–0
3	(Peru) Alianza Lima	6	1	2	3	10	11	−1	5	Round of 16	1–1	1–1	—	6–1
4	(Bolivia) Jorge Wilstermann	6	1	2	3	6	19	−13	5		2–2	1–1	2–1	—

8 February 1995
--:-- UTC−4

Bolívar (Bolivia)	2–0	(Bolivia) Jorge Wilstermann
Mir 36'; Ríos 43'	Report

Estadio Hernando Siles, La Paz
Attendance: 35,000
Referee: Pedro Saucedo (Bolivia)
8 February 1995
--:-- UTC−5

Sporting Cristal (Peru)	3–0	(Peru) Alianza Lima
Palacios 42'; Julinho 45'; Maestri 51'	Report

Estadio Nacional, Lima
Attendance: 41,689
Referee: José Arana (Peru)

14 February 1995
--:-- UTC−4

Jorge Wilstermann (Bolivia)	2–1	(Peru) Alianza Lima
Gonzáles 49'; Maladot 90'	Report	Gerson 70'

Estadio Félix Capriles, Cochabamba
Attendance: 25,000
Referee: Juan Bernabé (Paraguay)
18 February 1995
--:-- UTC−4

Bolívar (Bolivia)	3–1	(Peru) Alianza Lima
Mir 5', 80'; Ríos 70'	Report	Jayo 42'

Estadio Hernando Siles, La Paz
Attendance: 41,500
Referee: Efigenio Verdún (Paraguay)

21 February 1995
--:-- UTC−4

Jorge Wilstermann (Bolivia)	2–2	(Peru) Sporting Cristal
Maladot 78'; Angola 85'	Report	Pinillos 29'; Palacios 59'

Estadio Félix Capriles, Cochabamba
Attendance: 35,000
Referee: Ángel Sánchez (Argentina)
24 February 1995
--:-- UTC−4

Bolívar (Bolivia)	1–1	(Peru) Sporting Cristal
Cueto 71'	Report	Bica 88'

Estadio Hernando Siles, La Paz
Attendance: 45,000
Referee: Francisco Lamolina (Argentina)

8 March 1995
--:-- UTC−4

Jorge Wilstermann (Bolivia)	1–1	(Bolivia) Bolívar
Angola 5'	Report	Borja 48'

Estadio Félix Capriles, Cochabamba
Attendance: 35,000
Referee: Pablo Peña (Bolivia)
8 March 1995
--:-- UTC−5

Alianza Lima (Peru)	1–1	(Peru) Sporting Cristal
Marquinho 51'	Report	Palacios 38'

Estadio Nacional, Lima
Attendance: 17,000
Referee: Armando Pérez (Colombia)

14 March 1995
--:-- UTC−5

Alianza Lima (Peru)	6–1	(Bolivia) Jorge Wilstermann
Marquinho 8'; Sáenz 57', 73'; Gerson 64', 72'; Rosales 85'	Report	Takeo 9'

Estadio Nacional, Lima
Attendance: 22,500
Referee: Raúl Antonio Pérez (Venezuela)
17 March 1995
--:-- UTC−5

Sporting Cristal (Peru)	7–0	(Bolivia) Jorge Wilstermann
Earl 9'; Jor. Soto 52'; Palacios 59', 62', 65'; Solano 72'; Bica 89' (pen.)	Report

Estadio Nacional, Lima
Attendance: 16,000
Referee: Paolo Borgosano (Venezuela)

21 March 1995
--:-- UTC−5

Alianza Lima (Peru)	1–1	(Bolivia) Bolívar
Marquinho 44'	Report	Mercado 77'

Estadio Nacional, Lima
Attendance: 43,119
Referee: João Paulo Araújo (Brazil)
24 March 1995
--:-- UTC−5

Sporting Cristal (Peru)	1–0	(Bolivia) Bolívar
Bica 83'	Report

Estadio Nacional, Lima
Attendance: 27,000
Referee: Oscar Roberto Godói (Brazil)
