= 1995 Copa Libertadores finals =

- Event: 1995 Copa Libertadores
Grêmio	Atlético Nacional
(Brazil)	(Colombia)
4	2

First leg
Grêmio	Atlético Nacional
3	1
- Date: 23 August 1995
- Venue: Estádio Olímpico, Porto Alegre
- Referee: Alfredo Rodas (Ecuador)

Second leg
Atlético Nacional	Grêmio
1	1
- Date: 30 August 1995
- Venue: Estadio Atanasio Girardot, Medellín
- Referee: Salvador Imperatore (Chile)

The 1995 Copa Libertadores final was a two-legged football match-up to determine the 1995 Copa Libertadores champion. It was contested by Brazilian team Grêmio and Colombian club Atlético Nacional. In the first leg, held in Estádio Olímpico in Porto Alegre, Gremio beat Atlético Nacional 3–1. In the second leg, held in Estadio Atanasio Girardot in Medellín, the teams tied 1–1 and Gremio won their second Copa Libertadores.

== Qualified teams ==
Team	Previous finals app.
(Brazil) Grêmio	**1983**, 1984
(Colombia) Atlético Nacional	**1989**

Bold indicates winning years

== Venues ==
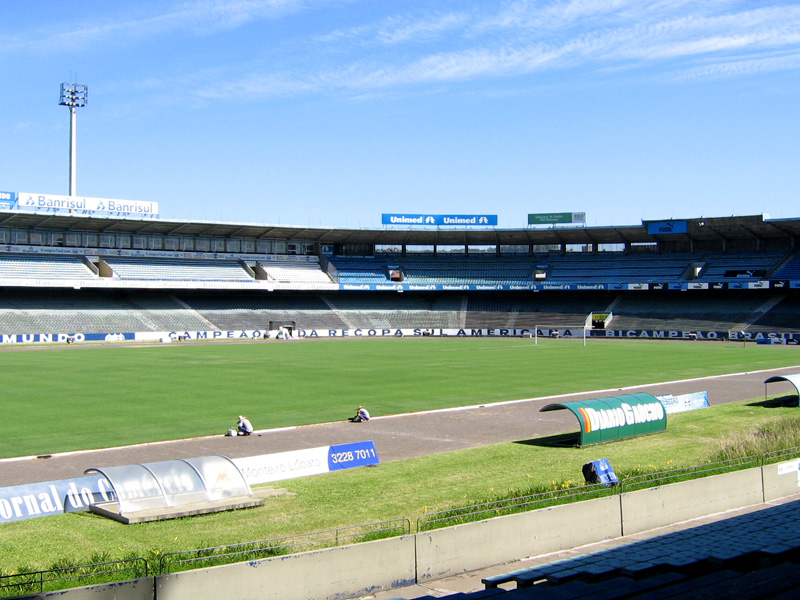
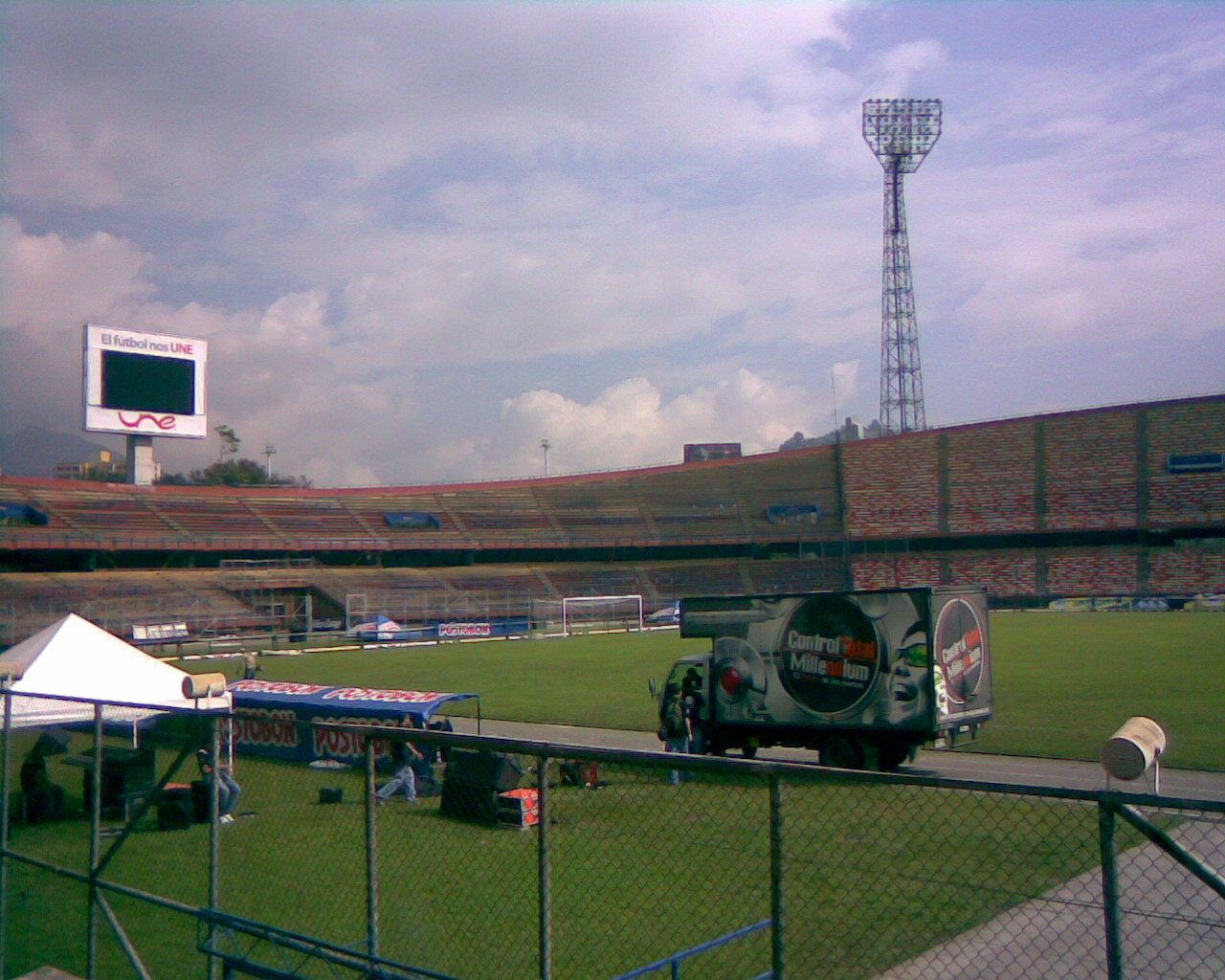
Estadio Olímpico (left) and Estadio Atanasio Girardot, venues for the series

== Match details ==
=== First leg ===
1995 Copa Libertadores finals
23 August 1995
First leg

Grêmio (Brazil)	3–1	(Colombia) Atlético Nacional
Marulanda 35' (o.g.); Jardel 43'; Paulo Nunes 55'		Ángel 72'

Estádio Olímpico, Porto Alegre
Attendance: 54,200
Referee: Alfredo Rodas (Ecuador)

**Grêmio**	**Atlético Nacional**

GK	1	(Brazil) Danrlei
DF	2	(Paraguay) Francisco Arce
DF	24	(Paraguay) Catalino Rivarola
DF	4	(Brazil) Adílson (c)	Booked
DF	6	(Brazil) Roger
MF	5	(Brazil) Dinho
MF	8	(Brazil) Goiano
MF	19	(Brazil) Arílson		(substituted off) 89'
MF	11	(Brazil) Carlos Miguel
FW	7	(Brazil) Paulo Nunes		(substituted off) 83'
FW	16	(Brazil) Mario Jardel
Substitutes:
MF	10	(Brazil) Nildo		(substituted on) 83'
FW	17	(Brazil) Alexandre Gaúcho		(substituted on) 89'
Manager:
(Brazil) Luiz Felipe Scolari

GK	1	(Colombia) René Higuita
DF	3	(Colombia) José Santa
DF	19	(Colombia) Víctor Marulanda
DF	13	(Colombia) Francisco Foronda
MF	17	(Colombia) Francisco Mosquera
MF	10	(Colombia) Mauricio Serna
MF	22	(Colombia) Carlos Gutiérrez	Booked
MF	14	(Colombia) Jaime Pabón		(substituted off) 46'
MF	8	(Colombia) Alexis García (c)	Booked
FW	21	(Colombia) Juan Pablo Ángel	Booked
FW	18	(Colombia) Jaime Arango
Substitutes:
FW	24	(Colombia) William Matamba		(substituted on) 46'
Manager:
(Colombia) Juan José Peláez

=== Second leg ===
30 August 1995
Second leg

Atlético Nacional (Colombia)	1–1	(Brazil) Grêmio
Aristizábal 12'		Dinho 85'

Estadio Atanasio Girardot, Medellín
Attendance: 49,000
Referee: Salvador Imperatore (Chile)

**Atlético Nacional**	**Grêmio**

GK	1	(Colombia) René Higuita
DF	3	(Colombia) José Santa		(substituted off) 57'
DF	19	(Colombia) Víctor Marulanda
DF	13	(Colombia) Francisco Foronda	Booked
MF	17	(Colombia) Francisco Mosquera		(substituted off) 82'
MF	10	(Colombia) Mauricio Serna	Booked
MF	22	(Colombia) Carlos Gutiérrez	Booked
MF	18	(Colombia) Jaime Arango		(substituted off) 57'
MF	8	(Colombia) Alexis García (c)
FW	21	(Colombia) Juan Pablo Ángel
FW	9	(Colombia) Víctor Aristizábal
Substitutes:
DF	4	(Colombia) Luis Herrera		(substituted on) 57'
FW	24	(Colombia) William Matamba		(substituted on) 57'
MF	14	(Colombia) Jaime Pabón		(substituted on) 82'
Manager:
(Colombia) Juan José Peláez

GK	1	(Brazil) Danrlei	Booked
DF	2	(Paraguay) Francisco Arce	Booked
DF	24	(Paraguay) Catalino Rivarola	Booked
DF	4	(Brazil) Adílson (c)		(substituted off) 78'
DF	6	(Brazil) Roger
MF	5	(Brazil) Dinho	Booked
MF	8	(Brazil) Goiano
MF	19	(Brazil) Arílson
MF	11	(Brazil) Carlos Miguel
FW	7	(Brazil) Paulo Nunes	(yellow card) (substituted off) 62'
FW	16	(Brazil) Mario Jardel		(substituted off) 82'
Substitutes:
FW	18	(Brazil) Alexandre Gaúcho		(substituted on) 62' (yellow card)
FW	3	(Brazil) Luciano Dias		(substituted on) 78'
MF	10	(Brazil) Nildo		(substituted on) 82'
Manager:
(Brazil) Luiz Felipe Scolari
