= 1995 Intercontinental Cup =

- Match programme cover
Ajax	Grêmio
(Netherlands)	(Brazil)
0	0
- After extra time Ajax won 4–3 on penalties
- Date: 28 November 1995
- Venue: National Stadium, Tokyo
- Man of the Match: Danny Blind (Ajax)
- Referee: David Elleray (England)
- Attendance: 47,129

The 1995 Intercontinental Cup was an association football match played on 28 November 1995 between Ajax, winners of the 1994–95 UEFA Champions League, and Grêmio, winners of the 1995 Copa Libertadores. The match was played at the National Stadium in Tokyo. It was Ajax's second appearance into the competition, after the victory in 1972; moreover, Ajax declined to play in 1971 and 1973, being replaced by Panathinaikos and Juventus respectively. It was Grêmio's second appearance as well, after the victory in 1983.

Danny Blind was named as man of the match.

== Venue ==
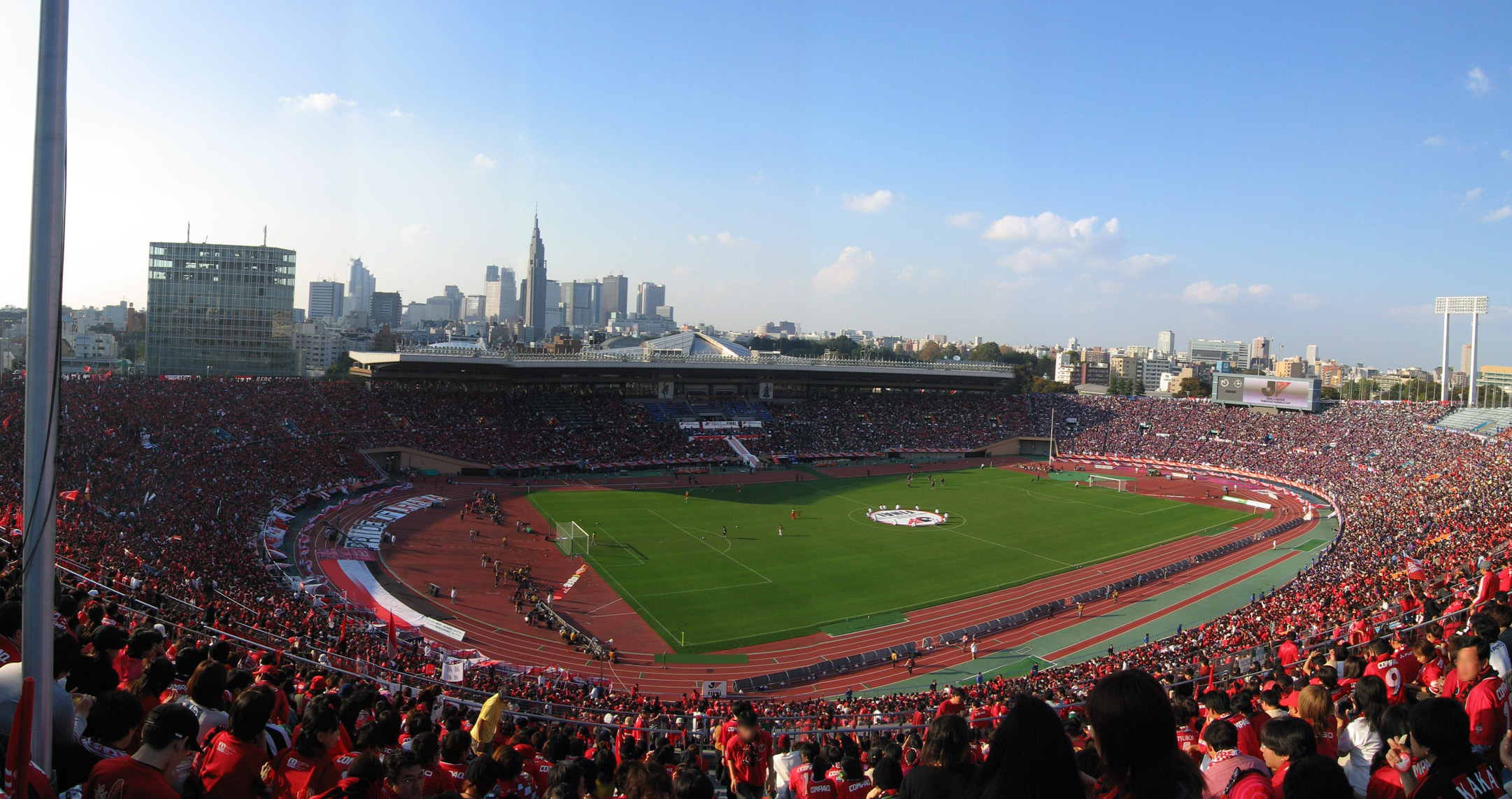
The National Stadium in Tokyo hosted the match

== Match details ==
28 November 1995
19:15 UTC+09:00

Ajax (Netherlands)	0–0 (a.e.t.)	(Brazil) Grêmio
	Report
Penalties
Kluivert (penalty missed); R. de Boer (penalty scored); F. de Boer (penalty scored); George (penalty scored); Blind (penalty scored)	4–3	(penalty missed) Dinho; (penalty missed) Arce; (penalty scored) Magno; (penalty scored) Gelson; (penalty scored) Adílson

National Stadium, Tokyo
Attendance: 47,129
Referee: David Elleray (England)

Ajax	Grêmio

GK	1	(Netherlands) Edwin van der Sar
RB	2	(Netherlands) Michael Reiziger
CB	3	(Netherlands) Danny Blind (c)
CB	4	(Netherlands) Frank de Boer
LB	5	(Netherlands) Winston Bogarde
CM	6	(Netherlands) Ronald de Boer
CM	8	(Netherlands) Edgar Davids	(yellow card) 113'
RW	7	(Nigeria) Finidi George
AM	10	(Finland) Jari Litmanen		(substituted off) 94'
LW	11	(Netherlands) Marc Overmars		(substituted off) 68'
CF	9	(Netherlands) Patrick Kluivert
Substitutes:
GK	12	(Netherlands) Fred Grim
DF	13	(Netherlands) Sonny Silooy
MF	14	(Netherlands) Martijn Reuser		(substituted on) 94'
FW	15	(Nigeria) Nwankwo Kanu	(yellow card) 70'	(substituted on) 68'
MF	16	(Netherlands) Kiki Musampa
FW	17	(Ukraine) Andriy Demchenko
FW	18	(Netherlands) Nordin Wooter
Manager:
(Netherlands) Louis van Gaal

GK	1	(Brazil) Danrlei
RB	2	(Paraguay) Francisco Arce	(yellow card) 18'
CB	4	(Brazil) Adílson (c)
CB	3	(Paraguay) Catalino Rivarola	(yellow card) 53' (red card) 56'
LB	6	(Brazil) Roger
DM	8	(Brazil) Goiano	(yellow card) 43'
DM	5	(Brazil) Dinho
AM	10	(Brazil) Arílson	(yellow card) 54'	(substituted off) 61'
AM	11	(Brazil) Carlos Miguel		(substituted off) 97'
CF	7	(Brazil) Paulo Nunes
CF	9	(Brazil) Mário Jardel		(substituted off) 78'
Substitutes:
GK	12	(Brazil) Murilo
DF	13	(Brazil) Luciano Dias		(substituted on) 61'
MF	14	(Brazil) Gelson	(yellow card) 109'	(substituted on) 97'
MF	15	(Brazil) Emerson
FW	16	(Brazil) Magno		(substituted on) 78'
FW	17	(Brazil) Nildo
FW	18	(Brazil) Alexandre
Manager:
(Brazil) Luiz Felipe Scolari

Man of the Match:
(Netherlands) Danny Blind (Ajax)

Match Ball

- The Ball of the match was the Adidas Questra, originally designed to be the official match ball of the 1994 FIFA World Cup in the United States.
- Both clubs were allowed to have a maximum of 4 foreign players on the field per squad.

== See also ==
- 1994–95 UEFA Champions League
- 1995 Copa Libertadores
- 1995–96 AFC Ajax season
- AFC Ajax in European football
