= 1994 Categoría Primera A season =

Copa Mustang
- Season: 1994
- Champions: Atlético Nacional (6th title)
- Relegated: Atlético Bucaramanga
- Copa Libertadores: Atlético Nacional; Millonarios
- Copa CONMEBOL: América de Cali; Independiente Medellín
- Matches: 404
- Goals: 1,063 (2.63 per match)
- Top goalscorer: Rubén Darío Hernández (32 goals)

The 1994 Categoría Primera A season, known as the 1994 Copa Mustang for sponsorship purposes, was the forty-seventh season of Colombia's top-flight football league. Atlético Nacional won the league for the sixth time after winning the season's final quadrangular on bonus points, clinching the title with a 1–0 victory over crosstown rivals Independiente Medellín on 18 December, the final day of the season.

Junior were the defending champions, but failed to advance to the final quadrangular after placing third in their semifinal group.

== Format ==
This season was split into four parts: Apertura and Finalización tournaments, the semifinal quadrangulars, and the final quadrangular. The Apertura and Finalización tournaments were played in a round-robin fashion, with the 16 teams playing each other once plus an extra match in the Apertura and twice more in the Finalización, for a total of 46 matches. The results of both the Apertura and the Finalización were combined into an aggregate table (Reclasificación), with the top eight teams in that table advancing to the semifinal quadrangulars. Bonus points for the final stages (semifinal and final quadrangulars) were awarded at the end of the Apertura and Finalización tournaments to the top four teams of each tournament, with the following scale being used: 1.00, 0.75, 0.50, and 0.25.

In the semifinal quadrangulars, the eight qualified teams were split into two groups of four in which teams played each of their group rivals twice, with the top two in each group advancing to the final quadrangular stage, which was also played under a double round-robin fashion. The team topping the final quadrangular won the league championship, while the team placing last in the aggregate table was relegated to Categoría Primera B.

== Teams ==
16 teams competed in the season, the top 15 teams from the 1993 Primera A championship along with the 1993 Primera B champions Cortuluá, who replaced Deportes Tolima who were relegated at the end of the previous season.

Locations of the 1994 Categoría Primera A teams

Team	City	Stadium
América de Cali	Cali	Olímpico Pascual Guerrero
Atlético Bucaramanga	Bucaramanga	Alfonso López
Atlético Huila	Neiva	Guillermo Plazas Alcid
Atlético Nacional	Medellín	Atanasio Girardot
Cortuluá	Tuluá	Doce de Octubre
Cúcuta Deportivo	Cúcuta	General Santander
Deportes Quindío	Armenia	Centenario
Deportivo Cali	Cali	Olímpico Pascual Guerrero
Deportivo Pereira	Pereira	Hernán Ramírez Villegas
Envigado	Envigado	Polideportivo Sur
Independiente Medellín	Medellín	Atanasio Girardot
Junior	Barranquilla	Metropolitano Roberto Meléndez
Millonarios	Bogotá	El Campín
Once Caldas	Manizales	Palogrande (Note: Once Caldas played its home matches in the Torneo Apertura at Estadio El Vergel in Riosucio, given the demolition and reconstruction of Estadio Palogrande (formerly known as Estadio Fernando Londoño Londoño).)
Santa Fe	Bogotá	El Campín
Unión Magdalena	Santa Marta	Eduardo Santos

== Torneo Apertura ==
Pos	Team	Pld	W	D	L	GF	GA	GD	Pts	Bonus
1	Atlético Nacional	16	8	6	2	17	7	+10	22	+1.00 points
2	América de Cali	16	8	4	4	26	20	+6	20	+0.75 points
3	Once Caldas	16	7	5	4	22	19	+3	19	+0.50 points
4	Envigado	16	6	7	3	18	17	+1	19	+0.25 points
5	Millonarios	16	7	4	5	29	19	+10	18	
6	Deportivo Cali	16	7	4	5	24	19	+5	18	
7	Cúcuta Deportivo	16	5	6	5	20	20	0	16	
8	Atlético Huila	16	5	5	6	20	22	−2	15	
9	Independiente Medellín	16	5	5	6	19	21	−2	15	
10	Junior	16	5	5	6	16	21	−5	15	
11	Unión Magdalena	16	5	4	7	16	17	−1	14	
12	Santa Fe	16	5	4	7	20	25	−5	14	
13	Cortuluá	16	5	3	8	21	24	−3	13	
14	Atlético Bucaramanga	16	3	7	6	20	24	−4	13	
15	Deportes Quindío	16	4	5	7	19	24	−5	13	
16	Deportivo Pereira	16	2	8	6	17	25	−8	12	

Source: RSSSF
Rules for classification: 1) Points, 2) Wins, 3) Goal difference, 4) Goals for, 5) Away goals for, 6) Goals against, 7) Away goals against, 8) Drawing of lots.

== Torneo Finalización ==
Pos	Team	Pld	W	D	L	GF	GA	GD	Pts	Bonus
1	Atlético Nacional	30	14	9	7	48	35	+13	37	+1.00 points
2	Millonarios	30	15	6	9	54	39	+15	36	+0.75 points
3	Independiente Medellín	30	13	10	7	43	35	+8	36	+0.50 points
4	Junior	30	12	11	7	51	37	+14	35	+0.25 points
5	Once Caldas	30	7	18	5	45	39	+6	32	
6	Deportivo Cali	30	11	9	10	45	46	−1	31	
7	Atlético Huila	30	10	9	11	43	47	−4	29	
8	Envigado	30	10	9	11	36	46	−10	29	
9	Cúcuta Deportivo	30	6	17	7	35	31	+4	29	
10	América de Cali	30	9	10	11	44	34	+10	28	
11	Deportes Quindío	30	9	10	11	44	52	−8	28	
12	Unión Magdalena	30	9	10	11	31	44	−13	28	
13	Deportivo Pereira	30	11	5	14	42	43	−1	27	
14	Santa Fe	30	8	9	13	33	42	−9	25	
15	Atlético Bucaramanga	30	7	11	12	32	45	−13	25	
16	Cortuluá	30	5	15	10	31	42	−11	25	

Source: RSSSF
Rules for classification: 1) Points, 2) Wins, 3) Goal difference, 4) Goals for, 5) Away goals for, 6) Goals against, 7) Away goals against, 8) Drawing of lots.

== Aggregate table ==
An aggregate table known as Reclasificación including the games of both tournaments (Apertura and Finalización) was used to determine the teams that would advance to the Copa Mustang final stages, as well as the team that was relegated to Categoría Primera B at the end of the season.

Pos	Team	Pld	W	D	L	GF	GA	GD	Pts	Qualification or relegation
1	Atlético Nacional	46	22	15	9	65	42	+23	59	Advance to the Final stages
2	Millonarios	46	22	10	14	83	58	+25	54	Advance to the Final stages
3	Independiente Medellín	46	18	15	13	62	56	+6	51	Advance to the Final stages
4	Once Caldas	46	14	23	9	67	58	+9	51	Advance to the Final stages
5	Junior	46	17	16	13	67	58	+9	50	Advance to the Final stages
6	Deportivo Cali	46	18	13	15	69	65	+4	49	Advance to the Final stages
7	América de Cali	46	17	14	15	70	54	+16	48	Advance to the Final stages
8	Envigado	46	16	16	14	54	63	−9	48	Advance to the Final stages
9	Cúcuta Deportivo	46	11	23	12	55	51	+4	45	
10	Atlético Huila	46	15	14	17	63	69	−6	44	
11	Unión Magdalena	46	14	14	18	47	61	−14	42	
12	Deportes Quindío	46	13	15	18	63	76	−13	41	
13	Deportivo Pereira	46	13	13	20	59	68	−9	39	
14	Santa Fe	46	13	13	20	53	67	−14	39	
15	Cortuluá	46	10	18	18	52	66	−14	38	
16	Atlético Bucaramanga (R)	46	10	18	18	52	69	−17	38	Relegation to Categoría Primera B

Source: RSSSF
Rules for classification: 1) Points, 2) Wins, 3) Goal difference, 4) Goals for, 5) Away goals for, 6) Goals against, 7) Away goals against, 8) Drawing of lots.
(R) Relegated

== Final stages ==
=== Semifinal quadrangulars ===
==== Group A ====
Pos	Team	Pld	W	D	L	GF	GA	GD	Pts	Qualification
1	Atlético Nacional	6	3	2	1	10	5	+5	10 (Note: Season bonus: 2.00 points)	Advance to Final quadrangular
2	Independiente Medellín	6	2	3	1	5	3	+2	7.5 (Note: Season bonus: 0.50 points)	Advance to Final quadrangular
3	Envigado	6	1	3	2	5	10	−5	5.25 (Note: Season bonus: 0.25 points)	
4	Deportivo Cali	6	0	4	2	5	7	−2	4	

Source: RSSSF
Rules for classification: 1) Points, 2) Wins, 3) Goal difference, 4) Goals for, 5) Away goals for, 6) Goals against, 7) Away goals against, 8) Rules 1) to 7) according to performance in the entire season, 9) Drawing of lots.

==== Group B ====
Pos	Team	Pld	W	D	L	GF	GA	GD	Pts	Qualification
1	América de Cali	6	5	0	1	9	5	+4	10.5 (Note: Season bonus: 0.50 points)	Advance to Final quadrangular
2	Millonarios	6	3	0	3	13	8	+5	7.5 (Note: Season bonus: 1.50 points)	Advance to Final quadrangular
3	Junior	6	2	1	3	5	7	−2	5.25 (Note: Season bonus: 0.25 points)	
4	Once Caldas	6	1	1	4	5	12	−7	3	

Source: RSSSF
Rules for classification: 1) Points, 2) Wins, 3) Goal difference, 4) Goals for, 5) Away goals for, 6) Goals against, 7) Away goals against, 8) Rules 1) to 7) according to performance in the entire season, 9) Drawing of lots.

=== Final quadrangular ===
Pos	Team	Pld	W	D	L	GF	GA	GD	Pts	Qualification
1	Atlético Nacional (C)	6	3	1	2	7	7	0	7 (Note: Season bonus: Atlético Nacional 2.00 points, Millonarios 1.50 points, América de Cali 0.50 points.)	Qualification for Copa Libertadores
2	Millonarios	6	3	1	2	9	7	+2	7	Qualification for Copa Libertadores
3	América de Cali	6	3	1	2	6	5	+1	7	Qualification for Copa CONMEBOL
4	Independiente Medellín	6	0	3	3	3	6	−3	3	Qualification for Copa CONMEBOL

Source: RSSSF
Rules for classification: 1) Points, 2) Bonus points, 3) Wins, 4) Goal difference, 5) Goals for, 6) Away goals for, 7) Goals against, 8) Away goals against, 9) Rules 1) to 8) according to performance in the entire season, 10) Drawing of lots.
(C) Champions

== Top goalscorers ==
Rank	Player	Club	Goals
1	(Colombia) Rubén Darío Hernández	Independiente Medellín / Deportivo Pereira / América de Cali	32
2	(Colombia) Alex Comas	Deportes Quindío / Atlético Nacional	31
3	(Colombia) Carlos Rendón	Millonarios	25
4	(Argentina) Jorge Ramoa	Atlético Bucaramanga	21
5	(Colombia) Arnoldo Iguarán	Millonarios	20
6	(Colombia) Wilson Cano	Independiente Medellín	18
6	(Colombia) Antony de Ávila	América de Cali	18
6	(Colombia) Hamilton Ricard	Deportivo Cali	18
9	(Colombia) Manuel Acisclo Córdoba	Atlético Huila	17
9	(Argentina) Daniel Tílger	Santa Fe	17

Source: Historia del Fútbol Profesional Colombiano 70 Años
