= Alberto Rujana =

Lebanese Colombian football manager (born 1955)

Personal information
- Full name: Alberto Rujana Perdomo
- Date of birth: 29 March 1955 (age 71)
- Place of birth: Beirut, Lebanon
- Height: 1.68 m (5 ft 6 in)
- Position: Right winger

Senior career*
Years	Team	Apps	(Gls)
1977	Millonarios		

Managerial career
- 1991: Once Caldas (assistant)
- 1992–1995: Atlético Huila
- 1996–1998: Once Caldas (assistant)
- 1999: Unión Minas
- 2001–2002: Real Cartagena
- 2002: Maracaibo
- 2009–2010: Maracaibo
- 2010: FAS
- 2012–2013: Llaneros
- 2021: Atlético Huila
- * Club domestic league appearances and goals

Alberto Rujana Perdomo (Hebrew: אלברט רוחנה, Arabic: ألبرتو روجانا; Alberto Rujanah; born 29 March 1955) is a Lebanese writer, athlete and soccer coach of Jewish-Syrian descent. He is a nationalized Colombian.

== Trajectory ==
=== Biography ===
His family is Syrian - Lebanese made up of his parents and 12 siblings, who in search of a better future in the mid 50's decided to emigrate to Colombia.

They came to the coffee country by boat crossing the entire ocean from their hometown Beirut to the city of Barranquilla. In Colombia they took another boat crossing the Magdalena River to the city of Neiva. Upon arrival, they changed their surnames to "Rujana Perdomo" and continued with their high school studies at the technical college.

=== Academic training ===
Alberto is studying physical education, recreation and sport at the Universidad Surcolombiana. Later he specialized as a soccer technical director in Italy where he did his practices in the AC Milan youth teams.

=== Debut with Millonarios FC ===
Before finishing his university studies, he was contacted by the DT of Millonarios of that time Gabriel Ochoa Uribe who, seeing that he was an outstanding student in all sports, decided to give him the opportunity to prove himself with the ambassador team, with whom he only played 1 professional game in the six months he was there in the position of right winger.

== Managerial career ==
Rujana studied around six months in Italy, with teams as AC Milan and Internazionale. The first professional team in which he worked as manager was Atlético Huila, team with which won the 1992 Categoría Primera B season in his first year at the club. On 1999, he becomes manager of Peruvian club Unión Minas. For the 2001, he returns to Colombia, where becomes manager of Real Cartagena, and the next year is hired by Unión Atlético Maracaibo of Venezuela.

In July 2010, he becomes manager of Salvadoran club C.D. FAS, but is fired three months later. In July 2012, he is contracted by the recently founded Categoría Primera B club Llaneros F.C., however he resigned in October 2013.

== Personal life ==
Rujana was born in Beirut, Lebanon, from Syrian-Lebanese parents. From a family of 12 children, they moved to Vegalarga, a town in Huila. There, they Hispanicized their names and changed their surnames Rujana Perdomo. Rujana is a graduate of the South Colombian University, where he studied Licenciatura en Educación Básica, con énfasis en Educación Física, Recreación y Deportes (Bachelor of Primary Education with emphasis on Physical Education, Recreation and Sports).

== Honours ==
Atlético Huila

- Primera B: 1992

== Managerial statistics ==
As of 22 October 2013

Team	Nation	From	To	Record				
Team	Nation	From	To	G	W	D	L	Win %
Atlético Huila	Colombia	1 January 1992	30 December 1995	148	50	46	52	33.78
Unión Minas	Peru	1 January 1999	30 December 1999	44	13	14	17	29.55
Real Cartagena	Colombia	1 January 2001	30 July 2002	66	15	21	30	22.73
Maracaibo	Venezuela	1 August 2002	6 October 2002	9	2	4	3	22.22
Maracaibo	Venezuela	1 July 2009	30 June 2010	32	9	7	16	28.13
FAS	El Salvador	1 July 2010	20 September 2010	12	2	4	6	16.67
Llaneros	Colombia	1 July 2012	31 October 2013	70	23	18	29	32.86
Total				381	114	114	153	29.92

== Books ==
- Rujana, Alberto. Cómo llegar al pressing –un sistema para no dejar pensar–.
- Rujana, Alberto. Los espacios en la zona pressing.
- Rujana, Alberto. Método y eficiencia en el fútbol.
- Rujana, Alberto. Juegos aplicados a la zona.
- Rujana, Alberto. El fútbol que no sabemos.
