= Gelson Silva =

Brazilian footballer and manager (born 1967)

Personal information
- Full name: Gelson da Silva
- Date of birth: 4 November 1967 (age 58)
- Place of birth: Itajaí, Brazil
- Height: 1.74 m (5 ft 8 1/2 in)
- Position: Midfielder

Senior career*
Years	Team	Apps	(Gls)
1985–1989	Marcílio Dias	42	(0)
1989–1994	Criciúma	49	(1)
1994–1996	Grêmio	137	(1)
1996–1997	América	19	(0)
1997–1998	Vitória	28	(0)
1998–1999	Sampaio Corrêa	36	(0)
1999–2001	Ceará	10	(0)

Managerial career
- 2005: Brusque
- 2006: Marcílio Dias
- 2006–2007: Criciúma
- 2007–2008: Grêmio Barueri
- 2008: Criciúma
- 2008: Gama
- 2008–2009: Mogi Mirim
- 2009: Joinville
- 2010–2011: Marcílio Dias
- * Club domestic league appearances and goals

Gelson da Silva (born 4 November 1967 in Itajaí, Santa Catarina), sometimes known as just Gelson, is a Brazilian football manager and former player. He played football for Grêmio FBPA, and scored a penalty for the club in the penalty shootout against AFC Ajax in the 1995 Intercontinental Cup in Japan.

== Honours ==
Criciúma

- Campeonato Catarinense: 1989, 1990 and 1991
- Copa do Brasil: 1991

Grêmio

- Campeonato Gaúcho: 1995
- Copa Libertadores: 1995
- Brazilian Serie A: 1996

Vitória

- Campeonato Baiano: 1997

Sampaio Corrêa

- Campeonato Maranhense: 1998
