= 1996 Copa Chile =

Tournament details
- Country: Chile

The 1996 Copa Chile was the 26th edition of the Chilean Cup tournament. The competition started on February 17, 1996, and concluded on November 30, 1996. Colo-Colo won the competition for their tenth time, beating Rangers in the finals.

== Calendar ==
Round	Date
Group Round	17 February 1996; 10 March 1996
Quarterfinals	9–17 July 1996
Semi-finals	24 September 1996; 26 November 1996
Final	28–30 November 1996

== Group Round ==
Key to colours in group tables
Teams that progressed to the Quarterfinals

=== Group 1A ===
	DANT	RATA	CLOA	COQU
D. Antofagasta		1–0	2–2	5–0
R. Atacama	3–0		1–1	1–1
Cobreloa	1–1	5–1		2–0
Coquimbo U.	1–2	2–2	1–1	

Rank	Team	Points
1	Deportes Antofagasta	11
2	Cobreloa	10
3	Regional Atacama	6
4	Coquimbo Unido	3

=== Group 2A ===
	COLO	UESP	PALE	SWAN
Colo-Colo		2–0	3–0	2–0
U. Española	1–3		0–3	2–3
Palestino	0–1	4–0		1–1
S. Wanderers	1–6	2–2	2–2	

Rank	Team	Points
1	Colo-Colo	18
2	Palestino	8
3	Santiago Wanderers	6
4	Unión Española	1

=== Group 3A ===
	UCAT	OHIG	HUAC	DCON
U. Católica		0–0	4–0	4–1
O'Higgins	1–2		1–1	3–0
Huachipato	1–2	3–1		0–2
D. Concepción	3–4	2–0	1–4	

Rank	Team	Points
1	Universidad Católica	16
2	Huachipato	7
3	Deportes Concepción	6
4	O'Higgins	5

=== Group 4A ===
	UCHI	AUDI	DTEM	POSO
U. de Chile		4–2	3–0	1–0
A. Italiano	0–2		0–0	2–1
D. Temuco	0–1	2–1		3–0
P. Osorno	1–0	3–2	0–1	

Rank	Team	Points
1	Universidad de Chile	15
2	Deportes Temuco	10
3	Provincial Osorno	6
4	Audax Italiano	4

=== Group 1B ===
	DARI	DIQU	CSAL	MAGA
D. Arica		1–0	1–2	1–2
D. Iquique	0–0		3–2	4–1
Cobresal	2–1	1–4		4–3
Magallanes	3–0	2–1	2–2	

Rank	Team	Points
1	Deportes Iquique	10 (+5)
2	Magallanes	10 (+1)
3	Cobresal	10 (-1)
4	Deportes Arica	4

=== Group 2B ===
	DLSE	DOVA	USFE	EVER
D. La Serena		1–0	4–1	1–0
D. Ovalle	1–1		2–0	1–1
U. San Felipe	1–5	2–0		1–3
Everton	3–0	0–1	2–1	

Rank	Team	Points
1	Deportes La Serena	13
2	Everton	10
3	Deportes Ovalle	8
4	Unión San Felipe	3

=== Group 3B ===
	DMEL	DCOL	USCR	RANG
D. Melipilla		4–1	1–0	2–1
D. Colchagua	2–1		1–1	2–2
U. Santa Cruz	0–1	2–4		1–3
Rangers	1–0	2–0	6–1	

Rank	Team	Points
1	Rangers	13
2	Deportes Melipilla	12
3	Deportes Colchagua	8
4	Unión Santa Cruz	1

=== Group 4B ===
	DLIN	ÑUBL	FVIA	DPMO
D. Linares		1–2	2–2	1–3
Ñublense	1–0		0–1	1–0
Fernández Vial	3–1	1–1		1–1
D. Puerto Montt	2–0	2–2	1–0	

Rank	Team	Points
1	Deportes Puerto Montt	11 (+4)
2	Ñublense	11 (+2)
3	Fernández Vial	9
4	Deportes Linares	1

== Quarterfinals ==
Team 1	Agg.	Team 2	1st leg	2nd leg
Deportes Iquique	2–5	Deportes Antofagasta	0–1	2–4
Deportes La Serena	1–2	Colo-Colo	1–1	0–1
Rangers	2–2 (a)	Universidad Católica	1–0	1–2
Deportes Puerto Montt	0–5	Universidad de Chile	0–0	0–5

== Semifinals ==
September 24, 1996

Rangers	1–0	Deportes Antofagasta
Rojas 33'

Estadio Fiscal, Talca
Attendance: 5,717
Referee: R. Hormazabal

September 30, 1996

Deportes Antofagasta	3–2	Rangers
Acosta 29', 50'; Cruz 67'		48' Rojas; 80' De Gregorio

Estadio Regional, Antofagasta
Attendance: 7,503
Referee: N. Mondria

November 19, 1996

Colo-Colo	2–3	Universidad de Chile
Reyes 11'; Tapia 79'		9' Sanchez; 25' Rodríguez; 90' Traverso

Estadio Monumental David Arellano, Santiago
Attendance: 16,893
Referee: C. Lemus

November 26, 1996

Universidad de Chile	0–2	Colo-Colo
		6' (pen.) Basay; 71' Espina

Estadio Nacional de Chile, Santiago
Attendance: 24,928
Referee: C. Robles

== Finals ==
November 28, 1996

Rangers	1–1	Colo-Colo
Andrade 15'		74' Tapia

Estadio Fiscal, Talca
Attendance: 13,343
Referee: R. Hormazabal

November 30, 1996

Colo-Colo	1–0	Rangers
Tapia 38'

Estadio Monumental David Arellano, Santiago
Attendance: 30,000
Referee: E. Gamboa

== Top goalscorers ==
Pos	Name	Team	Goals
1	(Chile) Hermes Navarro	Magallanes	9
2	(Chile) Fernando Vergara	Colo-Colo	7
	(Chile) Eladio Rojas	Rangers	7
4	(Uruguay) Daniel Fascioli	Deportes Antofagasta	6

== See also ==
- 1996 Campeonato Nacional
- Primera B
