= 1993 Categoría Primera A season =

Copa Mustang
- Season: 1993
- Champions: Junior (3rd title)
- Relegated: Deportes Tolima
- Copa Libertadores: Junior; Independiente Medellín
- Matches: 388
- Goals: 1,099 (2.83 per match)
- Top goalscorer: Miguel Guerrero (34 goals)

The 1993 Categoría Primera A season, known as 1993 Copa Mustang for sponsorship purposes, was the forty-sixth season of Colombia's top-flight football league. Junior won the league for the third time after winning the final quadrangular, clinching the title after defeating América de Cali 3–2 in their final match.

América de Cali were the defending champions, but placed last in the final quadrangular.

== Format ==
The season was split into four parts: Torneo Apertura, Torneo Finalización, semifinal quadrangulars, and final quadrangular. In the Torneo Apertura, the 16 participating teams were divided into two groups of eight, in which teams played each of their group rivals twice for a total of 14 matches, while in the Torneo Finalización, the 16 teams played each other twice in a double round-robin tournament for a total of 30 matches. The results of both the Apertura and the Finalización were combined into an aggregate table (Reclasificación), with the top eight teams in that table at the end of the season's 44 rounds advancing to the semifinal quadrangulars. Bonus points for the final stages (semifinal and final quadrangulars) were awarded at the end of the Apertura and Finalización tournaments to the top four teams of each tournament, with the following scale being used: 1.00, 0.75, 0.50, and 0.25. The placements of the top four teams in the Apertura for the purposes of bonus allocation were decided by two-legged playoffs between the group winners and runners-up.

In the semifinal quadrangulars, the eight participating teams were divided into two groups of four in which they played each of their group rivals twice, with the top two teams of each group advancing to the final quadrangular, in which they again played their other group rivals twice. The team that topped the final quadrangular was the champion.

== Teams ==
16 teams competed in the season, the top 15 teams from the 1992 Primera A championship along with the 1992 Primera B champions Atlético Huila, who replaced Real Cartagena who were relegated at the end of the previous season.

Locations of the 1993 Categoría Primera A teams

Team	City	Stadium
América de Cali	Cali	Olímpico Pascual Guerrero
Atlético Bucaramanga	Bucaramanga	Alfonso López
Atlético Huila	Neiva	Guillermo Plazas Alcid
Atlético Nacional	Medellín	Atanasio Girardot
Cúcuta Deportivo	Cúcuta	General Santander
Deportes Quindío	Armenia	Centenario
Deportes Tolima	Ibagué	Manuel Murillo Toro
Deportivo Cali	Cali	Olímpico Pascual Guerrero
Deportivo Pereira	Pereira	Hernán Ramírez Villegas
Envigado	Envigado	Polideportivo Sur
Independiente Medellín	Medellín	Atanasio Girardot
Junior	Barranquilla	Metropolitano Roberto Meléndez
Millonarios	Bogotá	El Campín
Once Caldas	Manizales	Fernando Londoño Londoño
Santa Fe	Bogotá	El Campín
Unión Magdalena	Santa Marta	Eduardo Santos

== Torneo Apertura ==
=== Group A ===
Pos	Team	Pld	W	D	L	GF	GA	GD	Pts	Qualification
1	Once Caldas	14	6	5	3	26	16	+10	17	Advance to Group winners playoff
2	Atlético Huila	14	6	5	3	22	17	+5	17	Advance to Group runners-up playoff
3	Millonarios	14	7	2	5	18	19	−1	16	
4	Deportivo Pereira	14	6	3	5	18	19	−1	15	
5	Deportivo Cali	14	6	2	6	20	20	0	14	
6	América de Cali	14	5	3	6	25	23	+2	13	
7	Santa Fe	14	4	3	7	21	25	−4	11	
8	Deportes Tolima	14	2	5	7	12	23	−11	9	

Source: RSSSF
Rules for classification: 1) Points, 2) Wins, 3) Goal difference, 4) Goals for, 5) Away goals for, 6) Goals against, 7) Away goals against, 8) Drawing of lots.

=== Group B ===
Pos	Team	Pld	W	D	L	GF	GA	GD	Pts	Qualification
1	Junior	14	9	3	2	26	12	+14	21	Advance to Group winners playoff
2	Atlético Nacional	14	7	2	5	23	18	+5	16	Advance to Group runners-up playoff
3	Atlético Bucaramanga	14	6	4	4	17	15	+2	16	
4	Independiente Medellín	14	5	5	4	18	18	0	15	
5	Envigado	14	4	5	5	18	17	+1	13	
6	Unión Magdalena	14	5	2	7	16	27	−11	12	
7	Deportes Quindío	14	4	3	7	21	20	+1	11	
8	Cúcuta Deportivo	14	2	4	8	11	25	−14	8	

Source: RSSSF
Rules for classification: 1) Points, 2) Wins, 3) Goal difference, 4) Goals for, 5) Away goals for, 6) Goals against, 7) Away goals against, 8) Drawing of lots.

=== Bonus allocation rounds ===
==== Group winners playoff ====
27 May 1993

Junior	1–1	Once Caldas

Estadio Metropolitano Roberto Meléndez, Barranquilla

4 June 1993

Once Caldas	3–2	Junior
Asprilla 33', 72'; Martínez 68'	Report	Mackenzie 36' (pen.)

Estadio Fernando Londoño Londoño, Manizales
Attendance: 13,000
Referee: Juan Manuel Gómez

Once Caldas won 3–1 on points and were awarded 1.00 bonus point. Junior were awarded 0.75 bonus points.

==== Group runners-up playoff ====
27 May 1993

Atlético Huila	1–3	Atlético Nacional
Berrío 76' (pen.)	Report	Gaviria 44'; Restrepo 61'; Vásquez 86'

Estadio Guillermo Plazas Alcid, Neiva

3 June 1993

Atlético Nacional	4–2	Atlético Huila
Tréllez 12' (pen.), 70'; Aristizábal 49'; García 50'	Report	Berrío 23', 28' (pen.)

Estadio Atanasio Girardot, Medellín
Attendance: 37,763
Referee: Óscar Ruiz

Atlético Nacional won 4–0 on points and were awarded 0.50 bonus points. Atlético Huila were awarded 0.25 bonus points.

== Torneo Finalización ==
Pos	Team	Pld	W	D	L	GF	GA	GD	Pts	Bonus
1	Independiente Medellín	30	16	7	7	49	28	+21	39	+1.00 points
2	Junior	30	14	7	9	57	47	+10	35	+0.75 points
3	Deportivo Cali	30	10	15	5	41	33	+8	35	+0.50 points
4	América de Cali	30	10	13	7	42	32	+10	33	+0.25 points
5	Once Caldas	30	11	10	9	39	39	0	32	
6	Envigado	30	10	12	8	31	30	+1	32	
7	Millonarios	30	9	13	8	33	28	+5	31	
8	Atlético Bucaramanga	30	10	11	9	37	35	+2	31	
9	Atlético Nacional	30	10	9	11	38	44	−6	29	
10	Deportivo Pereira	30	8	12	10	31	38	−7	28	
11	Cúcuta Deportivo	30	10	7	13	39	47	−8	27	
12	Unión Magdalena	30	10	7	13	38	37	+1	27	
13	Deportes Quindío	30	8	10	12	36	38	−2	26	
14	Santa Fe	30	7	12	11	43	45	−2	26	
15	Atlético Huila	30	7	11	12	30	40	−10	25	
16	Deportes Tolima	30	8	8	14	32	45	−13	24	

Source: RSSSF
Rules for classification: 1) Points, 2) Wins, 3) Goal difference, 4) Goals for, 5) Away goals for, 6) Goals against, 7) Away goals against, 8) Drawing of lots.

== Aggregate table ==
An aggregate table known as Reclasificación including the games of both tournaments (Apertura and Finalización) was used to determine the teams that would advance to the Copa Mustang final stages, as well as the team that was relegated to Categoría Primera B at the end of the season.

Pos	Team	Pld	W	D	L	GF	GA	GD	Pts	Qualification or relegation
1	Junior	44	23	10	11	83	61	+22	56	Advance to the Final stages
2	Independiente Medellín	44	21	12	11	97	89	+8	54	Advance to the Final stages
3	Once Caldas	44	17	15	12	65	55	+10	49	Advance to the Final stages
4	Deportivo Cali	44	16	17	11	61	53	+8	49	Advance to the Final stages
5	Atlético Bucaramanga	44	16	15	13	54	50	+4	47	Advance to the Final stages
6	Millonarios	44	16	15	13	51	47	+4	47	Advance to the Final stages
7	América de Cali	44	15	16	13	67	55	+12	46	Advance to the Final stages
8	Atlético Nacional	44	17	11	16	61	62	−1	45	Advance to the Final stages
9	Envigado	44	14	17	13	49	47	+2	45	
10	Deportivo Pereira	44	14	15	15	49	57	−8	43	
11	Atlético Huila	44	13	16	15	52	57	−5	42	
12	Unión Magdalena	44	15	9	20	54	64	−10	39	
13	Deportes Quindío	44	12	13	19	57	58	−1	37	
14	Santa Fe	44	11	15	18	64	70	−6	37	
15	Cúcuta Deportivo	44	12	11	21	50	72	−22	35	
16	Deportes Tolima (R)	44	10	13	21	44	68	−24	33	Relegation to Categoría Primera B

Source: RSSSF
Rules for classification: 1) Points, 2) Wins, 3) Goal difference, 4) Goals for, 5) Away goals for, 6) Goals against, 7) Away goals against, 8) Drawing of lots.
(R) Relegated

== Final stages ==
=== Semifinal quadrangulars ===
==== Group A ====
Pos	Team	Pld	W	D	L	GF	GA	GD	Pts	Qualification
1	Atlético Nacional	6	3	2	1	11	7	+4	8.5 (Note: Season bonus: 0.50 points)	Advance to Final quadrangular
2	Junior	6	3	1	2	9	9	0	8.5 (Note: Season bonus: 1.50 points)	Advance to Final quadrangular
3	Millonarios	6	2	1	3	9	8	+1	5	
4	Once Caldas	6	1	2	3	4	9	−5	5 (Note: Season bonus: 1.00 points)	

Source: RSSSF
Rules for classification: 1) Points, 2) Wins, 3) Goal difference, 4) Goals for, 5) Away goals for, 6) Goals against, 7) Away goals against, 8) Rules 1) to 7) according to performance in the entire season, 9) Drawing of lots.

==== Group B ====
Pos	Team	Pld	W	D	L	GF	GA	GD	Pts	Qualification
1	América de Cali	6	4	2	0	14	3	+11	10.25 (Note: Season bonus: 0.25 points)	Advance to Final quadrangular
2	Independiente Medellín	6	2	3	1	13	10	+3	8 (Note: Season bonus: 1.00 points)	Advance to Final quadrangular
3	Atlético Bucaramanga	6	2	0	4	8	15	−7	4	
4	Deportivo Cali	6	1	1	4	9	16	−7	3.5 (Note: Season bonus: 0.50 points)	

Source: RSSSF
Rules for classification: 1) Points, 2) Wins, 3) Goal difference, 4) Goals for, 5) Away goals for, 6) Goals against, 7) Away goals against, 8) Rules 1) to 7) according to performance in the entire season, 9) Drawing of lots.

=== Final quadrangular ===
Pos	Team	Pld	W	D	L	GF	GA	GD	Pts	Qualification
1	Junior (C)	6	3	1	2	14	11	+3	7 (Note: Season bonus: Junior 1.50 points, Independiente Medellín 1.00 points.)	Qualification for Copa Libertadores
2	Independiente Medellín	6	3	1	2	10	12	−2	7	Qualification for Copa Libertadores
3	Atlético Nacional	6	2	1	3	12	10	+2	5 (Note: Season bonus: Atlético Nacional 0.50 points, América de Cali 0.25 points.)	
4	América de Cali	6	2	1	3	9	12	−3	5	

Source: RSSSF
Rules for classification: 1) Points, 2) Bonus points, 3) Wins, 4) Goal difference, 5) Goals for, 6) Away goals for, 7) Goals against, 8) Away goals against, 9) Rules 1) to 8) according to performance in the entire season, 10) Drawing of lots.
(C) Champions

== Top goalscorers ==
Rank	Player	Club	Goals
1	(Colombia) Miguel Guerrero	Junior	34
2	(Colombia) Miguel Asprilla	Once Caldas	27
3	(Colombia) John Jairo Tréllez	Atlético Nacional	25
4	(Colombia) Rubén Darío Hernández	Independiente Medellín	21
4	(Colombia) Albeiro Usuriaga	América de Cali	21
6	(Colombia) Víctor Aristizábal	Atlético Nacional	20
7	(Colombia) Níver Arboleda	Deportivo Cali	19
8	(Colombia) Iván Valenciano	Junior	18
9	(Colombia) Ricardo Pérez	Millonarios	17
10	(Colombia) Héctor Acevedo	Envigado	16

Source: Historia del Fútbol Profesional Colombiano 70 Años
