= Nildo =

Nildo may refer to:

== Footballers ==
- Nildo (footballer, born 1966), Ivanildo Duarte Pereira, Brazilian forward
- Nildo (footballer, born 1975), Josenildo Caetano da Silva, Brazilian forward
- Nildo (footballer, born 1993), Josenildo Brito da Silva, Brazilian midfielder
