= Juan Carlos Ríos =

Bolivian footballer (born 1972)

Personal information
- Full name: Juan Carlos Javier Ríos Moreno
- Date of birth: 11 May 1972 (age 54)
- Place of birth: Tarija, Bolivia
- Position: Midfielder

International career
Years	Team	Apps	(Gls)
1993–1995	Bolivia	12	(2)

Juan Carlos Ríos Moreno (born 11 May 1972) is a Bolivian footballer. He played in twelve matches for the Bolivia national football team from 1993 to 1995. He was also part of Bolivia's squad for the 1993 Copa América tournament.
