= William Matamba =

Colombian footballer (born 1970)

Personal information
- Full name: William Gerardo Matamba Portocarrero
- Date of birth: December 31, 1970 (age 55)
- Place of birth: Tumaco, Colombia
- Position: Forward

Senior career*
Years	Team	Apps	(Gls)
1990–1992	Deportivo Pereira		
1993	Envigado		
1994	Once Caldas		
1995–1998	Atlético Nacional		
1999	Deportes Iquique		
1999	Deportivo Municipal		
2000–2001	Cienciano		
- * Club domestic league appearances and goals

William Gerardo Matamba Portocarrero (born December 31, 1970) is a former Colombian footballer who played for clubs in Colombia, Chile and Peru.

== Teams ==
- Deportivo Pereira 1990–1992
- Envigado 1993
- Once Caldas 1994
- Atlético Nacional 1995–1998
- Deportes Iquique 1999
- Deportivo Municipal 1999
- Cienciano 2000–2001
