= Luís Carlos Goiano =

Brazilian footballer

Personal information
- Full name: Luís Carlos Vaz da Silva
- Date of birth: 31 August 1968 (age 58)
- Place of birth: Santa Bárbara de Goiás, Brazil
- Height: 1.78 m (5 ft 10 in)
- Position: Defensive midfielder

Senior career*
Years	Team	Apps	(Gls)
1986	Atlético Goianiense		
1987–1994	Novorizontino		
1990	→ São José-SP (loan)		
1992	→ Ponte Preta (loan)		
1992	→ Sport Recife (loan)		
1993	→ São Paulo (loan)	16	(0)
1994	Remo		
1995–1999	Grêmio	58	(5)
2000	Atlético Paranaense	13	(1)
2001	Etti Jundiaí		
2002	Matonense		
2003	América Mineiro		

Managerial career
- 2009: Grêmio Barueri
- 2010: Mirassol
- 2013: Novorizontino
- * Club domestic league appearances and goals as of 25 August 2023

Luís Carlos Vaz da Silva (born 31 August 1968), better known as Luís Carlos Goiano, is a Brazilian former professional footballer and manager who played mostly as defensive midfielder.

== Honours ==
São Paulo

- Intercontinental Cup: 1993
- Supercopa Libertadores: 1993

Novorizontino

- Campeonato Brasileiro Série C: 1994

Grêmio

- Campeonato Gaúcho: 1995, 1996, 1999
- Copa Libertadores: 1995
- Sanwa Bank Cup: 1995
- Recopa Sudamericana: 1996
- Campeonato Brasileiro: 1996
- Copa do Brasil: 1997

Atlético Parananense

- Campeonato Paranaense: 2000

Paulista

- Campeonato Paulista Série A2: 2001
- Campeonato Brasileiro Série C: 2001

Individual

- Bola de Prata: 1996
