= 1992 Categoría Primera B season =

Categoría Primera B
- Season: 1992
- Champions: Atlético Huila (1st title)
- Promoted: Atlético Huila
- Top goalscorer: Guillermo Berrío (18 goals)

The 1992 Categoría Primera B season, (officially known as the 1992 Copa Concasa for sponsorship reasons) was the 2nd season of Colombia's second division football league. Atlético Huila won the tournament for the first time and was promoted to the Categoría Primera A. Guillermo Berrío, playing for Atlético Huila, was the topscorer with 18 goals.

== Teams ==
12 teams take part in the season. The previous season's champions Envigado was promoted to Primera A for the 1992 season. Two additional teams, Industrial Itagüí and Palmira, were accepted by DIMAYOR to compete in the tournament.

Team	City	Stadium
Academia Bogotana	Bogotá	El Campincito
Alianza Llanos	Villavicencio	Manuel Calle Lombana
Alianza Petrolera	Barrancabermeja	Daniel Villa Zapata
Atlético Buenaventura	Buenaventura	Marino Klinger
Atlético Huila	Neiva	Guillermo Plazas Alcid
Cortuluá	Tuluá	Doce de Octubre
Deportes Dinastía	Riosucio	El Vergel
Deportivo Armenia	Armenia	San José
Deportivo Rionegro	Rionegro	Alberto Grisales
El Cóndor	Bogotá	El Campincito
Industrial Itagüí	Itagüí	Metropolitano Ciudad de Itagüí
Palmira	Palmira	Francisco Rivera Escobar

Categoría Primera B
1992 champion
Atlético Huila
1st title
