= Alexandre Gaúcho =

Brazilian footballer

Personal information
- Full name: Alexandre de Ávila Vieira
- Date of birth: 20 June 1969 (age 57)
- Place of birth: Pelotas, Brazil
- Position: Midfielder

Youth career
- –1989: Pelotas

Senior career*
Years	Team	Apps	(Gls)
1989–1993	Pelotas		
1992	→ Goiás (loan)		
1994	Internacional		
1995–1996	Grêmio	45	(6)
1996	→ Araçatuba (loan)		
1996	→ Guarani (loan)		
1997	Araçatuba		
1997	Juventude		
1998	Rio Branco-SP		
1999	Inter de Limeira		
1999	Gama		
2000–2001	Botafogo		
2001	Flamengo	8	(0)
2002	Botafogo-SP		
2002	Portuguesa		
2002	Gama		
2003	Nacional-AM		
2004	Figueirense		
2005	São Raimundo-AM		
2006	Volta Redonda		
2006	São Raimundo-AM		
- * Club domestic league appearances and goals as of 30 November 2023

Alexandre de Ávila Vieira (born 20 June 1969), better known as Alexandre Gaúcho, is a Brazilian former professional footballer who played as a midfielder.

== Career ==
Revealed at EC Pelotas, he was state champion in 1994 at SC Internacional. The following year, he was part of the squad that won Grêmio in the Copa Libertadores, but did not establish himself in the team and played for several other clubs in Brazil, with emphasis on Flamengo where he was champion of the 2001 Copa dos Campeões.

== Personal life ==
in 2005 Alexandre Gaúcho was on the cover of the #089 issue of gay men's magazine G Magazine, in which he posed fully nude, with an erection.

== Honours ==
Internacional

- Campeonato Gaúcho: 1994

Grêmio

- Copa Libertadores: 1995

Flamengo

- Copa dos Campeões: 2001

Nacional

- Campeonato Amazonense: 2003

Figueirense

- Campeonato Catarinense: 2004
