= Osman López =

Colombian footballer (born 1970)

Personal information
- Full name: Osman López Caicedo
- Date of birth: 30 July 1970 (age 56)
- Place of birth: Buenaventura, Colombia
- Height: 1.91 m (6 ft 3 in)
- Position: Defender

Senior career*
Years	Team	Apps	(Gls)
1992–1998	Millonarios		
1999	Deportes Tolima	5	(0)
2001	Olimpia		
2002	Millonarios	28	(3)
2003–2004	Centauros Villavicencio	38	(3)

International career
1996–1997	Colombia	8	(0)
- * Club domestic league appearances and goals

Osman López (born 30 July 1970) is a retired footballer from Colombia. He played as a central defender.

== Career ==
López was most noted for his time playing for Millonarios de Bogotá, where he obtained the nickname "El Fosforito".
