= Garrafa Sánchez =

Argentine footballer

- Sánchez in Deportivo Laferrere c. 1993

Personal information
- Full name: José Luis Sánchez
- Date of birth: May 26, 1974
- Place of birth: Buenos Aires, Argentina
- Date of death: January 8, 2006 (aged 31)
- Place of death: Buenos Aires, Argentina
- Position: Attacking midfielder

Senior career*
Years	Team	Apps	(Gls)
1993–1997	Laferrere	93	(22)
1997–1999	El Porvenir	54	(28)
1999–2000	Bella Vista	1	(0)
2000–2005	Banfield	110	(20)
2005–2006	Laferrere	?	(?)
Total		258	(70)
- * Club domestic league appearances and goals

José Luis "Garrafa" Sánchez (May 26, 1974 – January 8, 2006) was an Argentine football midfielder. He played mostly for Deportivo Laferrere and Banfield, and is considered an idol for both of these clubs' fans. His nickname, garrafa, means gas cylinder in Spanish.

== Career ==
Sánchez started his career in 1993 (aged 19) playing for Laferrere against Almirante Brown in the Primera B Nacional (Argentine second division). He played as a left back, despite being regularly an attacking midfielder for the rest of his career. He scored his first professional goal against Colón in a 1–6 defeat. Sánchez could not help Laferrere avoid relegation and played one season with the team at the lower Primera B Metropolitana.

For the 1997-98 season he was transferred to El Porvenir, where he helped the team gain promotion to the Primera B Nacional. Subsequently, he had a brief spell at Uruguayan Bella Vista during the 1999–2000 season.

His next promotion would be achieved playing for Banfield in the 2000-01 season, when he helped the team reach the Argentine Primera División. Garrafa stayed in Banfield until 2005, playing the 2004 Copa Sudamericana and 2005 Copa Libertadores with the club and being part of the Primera División runner-up team of the 2005 Clausura. He returned to Laferrere in 2005, where he played until his death.

== Playing style ==
Sánchez was a classic style offensive midfielder (or enganche in Argentine terms), with great technique and precise shooting. His talent however was intermittent . Although there were rumours about Sanchez dislike of training, these are false, he was among the first to show up for training, always riding his motorcycle.

== Death ==
Sánchez died on January 8, 2006, as a consequence of injuries sustained while driving his motorcycle. The police report informed that he suffered the accident after attempting a wheelie, a classic bike trick.

== Honours ==
El Porvenir

- Primera B Metropolitana (1): 1997 Apertura

Banfield

- Primera B Nacional (1): 2000-01
