= Bica (footballer) =

Brazilian footballer (born 1972)

Personal information
- Full name: Marcus di Giuseppe
- Date of birth: 12 March 1972 (age 54)
- Place of birth: Registro, Brazil
- Height: 1.87 m (6 ft 2 in)
- Position: Forward

Senior career*
Years	Team	Apps	(Gls)
1995–1996	Sporting Cristal	5	(1)
1996	Austria Salzburg	18	(3)
1997–1998	Paniliakos	15	(3)
1998–1999	Sport Boys	10	(6)
1999	Sunderland	0	(0)
1999	Walsall	1	(0)
2000	Universitario de Deportes	8	(7)
2001	Danubio	3	(0)
2001–2002	Deportivo Wanka	14	(0)
2003–2004	Estudiantes de Medicina	5	(0)
2004–2005	Coronel Bolognesi	24	(11)
- * Club domestic league appearances and goals

Marcus Di Giuseppe, also known as Bica, (born 12 March 1972) is a Brazilian former footballer.

== Club career ==
Bica played for a number of clubs in Peru, including Sporting Cristal, Sport Boys and Universitario de Deportes. He also had a spell with Paniliakos in the Super League Greece during the 1997–98 season. He spent a few months playing in England for English Premier League side Sunderland A.F.C. and then First Division side Walsall at the end of 1999. His play was characterised by his swift and fluid running and incredible ball control skills. His powerful heading and his shooting from distance gave him the nickname "enerpoçinho" amongst his peers, fans and teammates. He's now a football player's agent.
