= Bonner Mosquera =

Colombian footballer (born 1970)

Personal information
- Full name: Bonner Ahmed Mosquera
- Date of birth: December 2, 1970 (age 55)
- Place of birth: Condoto, Colombia
- Positions: Defender; midfielder

Team information
- Current team: Millonarios

Senior career*
Years	Team	Apps	(Gls)
1992–2000	Millonarios	325	(34)
2001	Defensor Sporting	32	(0)
2002–2006	Millonarios	129	(3)

International career
1995–2000	Colombia	10	(0)

Managerial career
- 2008: Millonarios
- * Club domestic league appearances and goals as of 21 June 2007

Bonner Ahmed Mosquera (born 2 December 1970) is a Colombian former football player, who used to play in the defender or midfielder position.

== Club career ==
He is the player with the most appearances ever in Millonarios, 524 in total, surpassing players like Willington Ortiz in number of appearances made as a Millos player.

== Retirement ==
Mosquera retired from professional football in December 2006, although he continued his commitment to Millonarios, where he eventually became Assistant Manager.
