= Rubén Acosta (footballer) =

Uruguayan footballer (born 1968)

Personal information
- Full name: Rubén Ademar Acosta Orrico
- Date of birth: 22 March 1968 (age 58)
- Place of birth: Montevideo, Uruguay
- Height: 1.74 m (5 ft 9 in)
- Position: Striker

Senior career*
Years	Team	Apps	(Gls)
1986–1987	Platense Montevideo		
1988–1989	Nacional	8	(0)
1990	Villa Española		
1991	Colón FC		
1992–1995	Cerro		
1996–1998	Deportes Antofagasta	48	(10)
1998	Palestino	9	(2)
1999	Huracán Buceo		
2000	Villa Española		
2000	Racing Montevideo		
2001–2002	Tacuarembó		
2003	Deportivo Colonia		
- * Club domestic league appearances and goals

Rubén Ademar Acosta Orrico (born March 22, 1968) is a Uruguayan former professional footballer who played as a striker for clubs in Uruguay and Chile.

== Teams ==
- (Uruguay) Platense 1986–1987
- (Uruguay) Nacional 1988–1989
- (Uruguay) Villa Española 1990
- (Uruguay) Colón FC 1991
- (Uruguay) Cerro 1992–1995
- (Chile) Deportes Antofagasta 1996–1998
- (Chile) Palestino 1998
- (Uruguay) Huracán Buceo 1999
- (Uruguay) Villa Española 2000
- (Uruguay) Racing Club de Montevideo 2000
- (Uruguay) Tacuarembó 2001–2002
- (Uruguay) Deportivo Colonia 2003
