= 1995 Copa Libertadores =

36th season of Copa Libertadores

1995 Copa Libertadores de América
Libertadores 1995

Tournament details
- Dates: February 8 - August 30
- Teams: 21 (from 10 associations)

Final positions
- Champions: (Brazil) Grêmio (2nd title)
- Runners-up: (Colombia) Atlético Nacional

Tournament statistics
- Matches played: 91
- Goals scored: 279 (3.07 per match)
- Top scorer: (Brazil) Jardel (12 goals)

The 1995 edition of the Copa Libertadores saw Grêmio of Brazil as the champions after they defeated Atlético Nacional of Colombia in the finals.

== Group stage ==
In the group stage, each group was played on a home-and-away round-robin basis. The teams were ranked according to the following criteria: 1. Points (3 points for a win, 1 point for a draw, and 0 points for a loss); 2. Goal difference; 3. Goals scored; 4. Away goals scored; 5. Drawing of lots.

If two teams from the same national association tie on points, the above criteria would not apply and their final positions would be determined in an extra match to be played at a neutral venue within their own country. Winners of this match qualified for the round of 16; in the event of a draw, the team with the best goal difference in the group would have qualified.

The winners, runners-up and third placed teams of each group advanced to the round of 16 of the final stages.

=== Group 1 ===
Pos	Team	Pld	W	D	L	GF	GA	GD	Pts	Qualification	RIV	PEÑ	IND	CRR
1	(Argentina) River Plate	6	3	3	0	11	6	+5	12	Round of 16	—	1–1	2–0	5–0
2	(Uruguay) Peñarol	6	2	3	1	9	7	+2	9	Round of 16	1–1	—	1–2	3–3
3	(Argentina) Independiente	6	2	1	3	8	8	0	7	Round of 16	1–1	0–1	—	2–1
4	(Uruguay) Cerro	6	1	1	4	5	12	−7	4		0–1	0–2	1–0	—

Legend: Blue = home team win; Yellow = draw; Red = away team win.

=== Group 2 ===
Pos	Team	Pld	W	D	L	GF	GA	GD	Pts	Qualification	CCP	OLI	CAR	TRU
1	(Paraguay) Cerro Porteño	6	4	2	0	16	6	+10	14	Round of 16	—	2–2	2–1	3–1
2	(Paraguay) Olimpia	6	3	3	0	16	7	+9	12	Round of 16	1–1	—	5–0	4–1
3	(Venezuela) Caracas	6	2	0	4	8	18	−10	6	Round of 16	0–6	1–2	—	3–2
4	(Venezuela) Trujillanos	6	0	1	5	8	17	−9	1		1–2	2–2	1–3	—

Legend: Blue = home team win; Yellow = draw; Red = away team win.

=== Group 3 ===
Pos	Team	Pld	W	D	L	GF	GA	GD	Pts	Qualification	MIL	ATN	UCA	UCH
1	(Colombia) Millonarios	6	3	1	2	11	8	+3	10	Round of 16	—	2–0	5–1	1–0
2	(Colombia) Atlético Nacional	6	2	3	1	5	4	+1	9	Round of 16	0–0	—	3–1	1–0
3	(Chile) Universidad Católica	6	2	1	3	10	14	−4	7 (Note: Play-off match: Universidad Católica 4–1 Universidad de Chile.)	Round of 16	4–1	1–1	—	2–0
4	Universidad de Chile	6	2	1	3	7	7	0	7		3–2	0–0	4–1	—

Legend: Blue = home team win; Yellow = draw; Red = away team win.

=== Group 4 ===
Pos	Team	Pld	W	D	L	GF	GA	GD	Pts	Qualification	PAL	GRE	EME	ELN
1	(Brazil) Palmeiras	6	4	1	1	15	5	+10	13	Round of 16	—	3–2	2–1	7–0
2	(Brazil) Grêmio	6	3	2	1	12	7	+5	11	Round of 16	0–0	—	4–1	2–0
3	(Ecuador) Emelec	6	1	2	3	8	12	−4	5	Round of 16	1–3	2–2	—	1–1
4	(Ecuador) El Nacional	6	1	1	4	3	14	−11	4		1–0	1–2	0–2	—

Legend: Blue = home team win; Yellow = draw; Red = away team win.

=== Group 5 ===
Pos	Team	Pld	W	D	L	GF	GA	GD	Pts	Qualification	SCR	BOL	ALI	WIL
1	(Peru) Sporting Cristal	6	3	3	0	15	4	+11	12	Round of 16	—	1–0	3–0	7–0
2	(Bolivia) Bolívar	6	2	3	1	8	5	+3	9	Round of 16	1–1	—	3–1	2–0
3	(Peru) Alianza Lima	6	1	2	3	10	11	−1	5	Round of 16	1–1	1–1	—	6–1
4	(Bolivia) Jorge Wilstermann	6	1	2	3	6	19	−13	5		2–2	1–1	2–1	—

Legend: Blue = home team win; Yellow = draw; Red = away team win.

== Final stages ==
=== Bracket ===
Round of 16
(Ecuador) Emelec	2	0	2 (5)
(Paraguay) Cerro Porteño	0	2	2 (4)
(Venezuela) Caracas	2	3	5
(Peru) Sporting Cristal	2	6	8
(Paraguay) Olimpia	0	0	0
(Brazil) Grêmio	3	2	5
(Bolivia) Bolívar	1	0	1
(Brazil) Palmeiras	0	3	3
(Colombia) Atlético Nacional	3	3	6
(Uruguay) Peñarol	1	1	2
(Peru) Alianza Lima	1	0	1
(Colombia) Millonarios	1	2	3
(Chile) U. Católica	2	1	3
(Argentina) River Plate	1	3	4
(Argentina) Independiente	0	2	2
(Argentina) Vélez Sarsfield	3	2	5

Quarterfinals
(Ecuador) Emelec	3	1	4
(Peru) Sporting Cristal	1	1	2
(Brazil) Grêmio	5	1	6
(Brazil) Palmeiras	0	5	5
(Colombia) Atlético Nacional	2	1	3
(Colombia) Millonarios	1	1	2
(Argentina) River Plate	1	0	1 (5)
(Argentina) Vélez Sarsfield	1	0	1 (3)

Semifinals
(Ecuador) Emelec	0	0	0
(Brazil) Grêmio	0	2	2
(Colombia) Atlético Nacional	1	0	1 (8)
(Argentina) River Plate	0	1	1 (7)

Final
(Brazil) Grêmio	3	1	4
(Colombia) Atlético Nacional	1	1	2

=== Round of 16 ===
First leg matches were played between April 25, 1995, and April 27, 1995. Second leg matches were played on May 3, 1995, and May 4, 1995.

Team 1	Agg.	Team 2	1st leg	2nd leg
Olimpia (Paraguay)	0–5	(Brazil) Grêmio	0–3	0–2
Emelec (Ecuador)	2–2 (5–4 pk)	(Paraguay) Cerro Porteño	2–0	0–2
Alianza Lima (Peru)	1–3	(Colombia) Millonarios	1–1	0–2
Caracas (Venezuela)	5–8	(Peru) Sporting Cristal	2–2	3–6
Bolívar (Bolivia)	1–3	(Brazil) Palmeiras	1–0	0–3
Atlético Nacional (Colombia)	6–2	(Uruguay) Peñarol	3–1	3–1
Independiente (Argentina)	2–5	(Argentina) Vélez Sársfield	0–3	2–2
Universidad Católica (Chile)	3–4	(Argentina) River Plate	2–1	1–3

=== Quarter-finals ===
First leg matches were played on July 21, 1995, and July 26, 1995. Second leg matches were played on August 2, 1995.

Team 1	Agg.	Team 2	1st leg	2nd leg
River Plate (Argentina)	1–1 (5–3 pk)	(Argentina) Vélez Sarsfield	1–1	0–0
Grêmio (Brazil)	6–5	(Brazil) Palmeiras	5–0	1–5
Emelec (Ecuador)	4–2	(Peru) Sporting Cristal	3–1	1–1
Atlético Nacional (Colombia)	3–2	(Colombia) Millonarios	2–1	1–1

=== Semi-finals ===
First leg matches were played on August 9, 1995. Second leg matches were played on August 16, 1995.

Team 1	Agg.	Team 2	1st leg	2nd leg
Atlético Nacional (Colombia)	1–1 (8–7 pk)	(Argentina) River Plate	1–0	0–1
Emelec (Ecuador)	0–2	(Brazil) Grêmio	0–0	0–2

=== Finals ===
Team 1	Agg.	Team 2	1st leg	2nd leg
Grêmio (Brazil)	4–2	(Colombia) Atlético Nacional	3–1	1–1

==== First leg ====
23 August 1995	Grêmio (Brazil)	3 – 1	(Colombia) Atlético Nacional	Estádio Olímpico Monumental, Porto Alegre
	Marulanda 26' (o.g.); Jardel 43'; Paulo Nunes 55'		Ángel 71'	Attendance: 48,500; Referee: Alfredo Rodas (Ecuador)

==== Second leg ====
30 August 1995	Atlético Nacional (Colombia)	1 – 1	(Brazil) Grêmio	Estadio Atanasio Girardot, Medellín
	Aristizábal 12'		Dinho 85' (pen.)	Attendance: 52,000; Referee: Salvador Imperatore (Chile)

== Champion ==
1995 Copa Libertadores

Second title

== Top scorers ==
Rank	Player	Team	GS1	GS2	GS3	GS4	GS5	GS6	GPO	⅛F1	⅛F2	QF1	QF2	SF1	SF2	F1	F2	Total
1	(Brazil) Jardel	(Brazil) Grêmio	1	1			1	1		1	1	3	1		1	1		12
2	(Argentina) Alberto Acosta	(Chile) Universidad Católica	1	1		1	1		2	1								7
2	(Colombia) Víctor Aristizábal	(Colombia) Atlético Nacional		1			1			2	1	1					1	7
2	(Paraguay) Richart Báez	(Paraguay) Olimpia		2	1	1		3										7
2	(Peru) Roberto Palacios	(Peru) Sporting Cristal	1	1		1	3				1							7
6	(Venezuela) Gerson Díaz	(Venezuela) Caracas	2			1	1			1	1							6
6	(Ghana) Ibrahim Salisú	(Venezuela) Caracas	1		1		2				2							6
8	(Brazil) Edmundo	(Brazil) Palmeiras	1				2	2										5
8	(Ecuador) Eduardo Hurtado	(Ecuador) Emelec			1		1			1		2						5
8	(Colombia) Freddy León	(Colombia) Millonarios		1		1	1	1					1					5
8	(Brazil) Paulo Nunes	(Brazil) Grêmio		1			1			1					1	1		5
8	(Brazil) Rivaldo	(Brazil) Palmeiras	1		1			2			1							5
8	(Chile) Marcelo Salas	Universidad de Chile	3				2											5

Source: CONMEBOL

== See also ==
- 1995 Intercontinental Cup
