= Guillermo Berrío =

Colombian footballer (1968–2021)

Personal information
- Full name: Luis Guillermo Berrío Gómez
- Date of birth: 11 April 1968
- Place of birth: Amagá, Colombia
- Date of death: 11 April 2021 (aged 53)
- Place of death: Cali, Colombia
- Position: Midfielder

Senior career*
Years	Team	Apps	(Gls)
- Envigado
- Atlético Huila
- Deportes Quindío
- Unión Minas
- Juan Aurich
- Deportivo Pereira

Managerial career
- 2009–2011: Atlético Huila
- 2011–2012: Independiente Medellín
- 2013–2014: Alianza Petrolera
- 2015–2016: Deportivo Pasto
- * Club domestic league appearances and goals

Luis Guillermo Berrío Gómez (11 April 1968 – 11 April 2021) was a Colombian football player and coach.

== Playing career ==
Born in Amagá, Berrío began his career in 1988, playing for Envigado, Atlético Huila, Deportivo Pereira and Deportes Quindío, and winning four promotions throughout his career. He also played in Peru for Unión Minas and Juan Aurich. He retired in 2004, whilst a Deportivo Pereira player.

== Coaching career ==
Berrío coached more than 300 games, for clubs including Atlético Huila, Independiente Medellín, Alianza Petrolera and Deportivo Pasto.

== Later life and death ==
Berrío died of a heart attack on his 53rd birthday.
