= Antonio Vidal González =

Argentine footballer

Personal information
- Date of birth: 22 April 1964 (age 62)
- Place of birth: Posadas, Argentina
- Position: Forward

Senior career*
Years	Team	Apps	(Gls)
1984	San Martín de Tucumán		
1985	Guaraní Antonio Franco		
1986	Estudiantes		
1987–1988	Guaraní Antonio Franco		
1988	San Martín de Tucumán		
1989–1991	Argentinos Juniors		
1992–1994	Nacional		
1994–1995	Emelec		
1995	Colón		
1996	Defensor Sporting		
1996–1997	Bolívar		
1997	Defensor Sporting		
1998	Jorge Wilstermann		
1999–2000	The Strongest		
2001	Oriente Petrolero		
2002	Unión Central		
2003–2004	Atlético Candelaria		
- * Club domestic league appearances and goals

Antonio Vidal González (born 22 April 1964) is an Argentine former professional forward.
