= Nildo (footballer, born 1966) =

Brazilian footballer

Personal information
- Full name: Ivanildo Duarte Pereira
- Date of birth: 12 March 1966 (age 60)
- Place of birth: Belém, Brazil
- Height: 1.80 m (5 ft 11 in)
- Position: Forward

Senior career*
| Years | Team | Apps | (Gls) |
| 1982–1984 | Remo | | |
| 1985 | Ferroviário | | |
| 1985–1986 | Matsubara | | |
| 1987 | Barretos | | |
| 1988 | Olímpia | | |
| 1989 | Inter de Limeira | | |
| 1990 | Sãocarlense | | |
| 1991 | Esportivo-MG | | |
| 1991–1992 | Brusque | | |
| 1992–1993 | Cerro Porteño | | |
| 1993–1994 | Caldense | | |
| 1994–1996 | Grêmio | 61 | (23) |
| 1996–1997 | Gil Vicente | | |
| 1997–1998 | Ceará | | |
| 1998 | Portuguesa Santista | | |
| 1998–1999 | Paysandu | | |
| 2000 | Rio Preto | | |
| 2001 | Avaí | | |
| 2002 | Ananindeua | | |
| 2003 | Carajás | | |

Managerial career
- 2022: Sport Real-PA
- * Club domestic league appearances and goals as of 15 October 2023

Ivanildo Duarte Pereira (born 12 March 1966), better known as Nildo, is a Brazilian former professional footballer who played as a forward.

== Career ==
Nildo had the best moment of his career when he was champion of the 1995 Copa Libertadores with Grêmio. Nildo was also the scorer of the goal on the 1994 Copa do Brasil final, in Grêmio's victory over Ceará, 1–0.

In 2022 Nildo was announced as coach of Sport Real, in the second division of Pará.

== Honours ==
Grêmio

- Copa do Brasil: 1994
- Copa Libertadores: 1995
- Campeonato Gaúcho: 1995

Ceará

- Campeonato Cearense: 1997, 1998

Individual

- 1997 Copa do Nordeste top scorer: 6 goals
