= Kléber Fajardo =

Ecuadorian footballer (born 1965)

Personal information
- Full name: Kleber Emilson Fajardo Barzola
- Date of birth: 4 January 1965 (age 61)
- Place of birth: Balzar, Ecuador
- Position: Defender

Senior career*
Years	Team	Apps	(Gls)
- Emelec
- Olmedo
- Audaz Octubrino

International career
1987–1994	Ecuador	35	(0)
- * Club domestic league appearances and goals

Kleber Emilson Fajardo Barzola (born 4 January 1965) is an Ecuadorian former footballer who played as a defender. He made 35 appearances for the Ecuador national team from 1987 to 1994. He was also part of Ecuador's squad for the 1987 Copa América tournament.
