= Luciano Dias =

Brazilian football coach and former player

Personal information
- Full name: Luciano Williames Dias
- Date of birth: 25 July 1970 (age 56)
- Place of birth: Porto Alegre, Brazil
- Height: 1.86 m (6 ft 1 in)
- Position: Defender

Senior career*
Years	Team	Apps	(Gls)
1990–1997	Grêmio	50	(3)
1997–1998	Standard Liège	18	(4)
1999	Corinthians	4	(0)
2000–2002	Fluminense		
2002	Mamoré		

Managerial career
- 2004–2005: SEV Hortolândia
- 2005: Tanabi
- 2006: Corinthians Alagoano
- 2006: Esportivo
- 2007: Rio Preto
- 2008: Botafogo-SP
- 2008–2009: Guarani
- 2009: Oeste
- 2009–2010: São Bernardo
- 2010–2011: Noroeste
- 2011: Red Bull Brasil
- 2012: São Bernardo
- 2012: Cuiabá
- 2013: São Bernardo
- 2013: Grêmio Catanduvense
- 2013: Penapolense
- 2014: Cuiabá
- 2016: Santo André
- 2016: Sergipe
- 2016: Rio Preto
- 2017: Comercial-SP
- 2017: Barra-SC
- 2020–2021: Monte Azul
- 2021–2022: XV de Piracicaba
- 2022: CEOV
- 2022: Taubaté
- 2023: Corinthians (assistant)
- * Club domestic league appearances and goals

Luciano Williames Dias (born 25 July 1970) is a Brazilian football coach and former player.

== Playing career ==
In his playing days he was a defender for Grêmio, Standard Liège, Corinthians, Fluminense and Mamoré.

Luciano was a player on Luiz Felipe Scolari's Grêmio team who won the 1995 Copa Libertadores. After being sold in 1997, he made 18 Belgian First Division A appearances for Standard Liège, weighing in with four goals.
