= Arílson =

Brazilian footballer (born 1973)

Personal information
- Full name: Arílson Gilberto da Costa
- Date of birth: 11 June 1973 (age 53)
- Place of birth: Bento Gonçalves, Brazil
- Position: Midfielder

Senior career*
Years	Team	Apps	(Gls)
1989–1993	Esportivo BG		
1993–1995	Grêmio	28	(0)
1995–1996	1. FC Kaiserslautern	10	(0)
1996–1997	Internacional	38	(6)
1998–1999	Palmeiras	14	(0)
1999	Grêmio	1	(0)
1999–2000	Real Valladolid	5	(0)
2001–2002	Universidad de Chile	23	(9)
2002	15 de Novembro		
2002	Portuguesa (SP)	5	(0)
2002	América Mineiro		
2003–2004	Club Santa Fe	8	(0)
2004–2005	Grêmio	10	(0)
2005–2006	Mogi Mirim		
2007–2008	Atlético Tubarão		
2008	São Luiz		
2008	Itinga		
2009	14 de Julho		

International career
1995–1996	Brazil	7	(0)

Managerial career
- 2017: Aimoré U20
- 2018: Aimoré
- 2019: Operário-MS
- 2019: Curitibanos
- 2020: Grêmio Bagé
- 2021: Grêmio Sorriso
- 2021: Atlético Catarinense
- 2022: Grêmio Sorriso
- 2022–2023: Atlético Catarinense
- * Club domestic league appearances and goals

Arílson Gilberto da Costa (born 11 June 1973), simply known as Arílson, is a Brazilian professional football coach and former player who played as a midfielder.

Arílson for Esportivo de Bento Gonçalves, Grêmio, 1. FC Kaiserslautern, Internacional, Palmeiras, Real Valladolid, Universidad de Chile, 15 de Novembro, Portuguesa (SP), América Mineiro, Club Santa Fe, Mogi Mirim and Atlético Tubarão. He also represented the Brazilian national side in seven international games between 1995 and 1996.

== Career ==
Arílson began playing football in the Bento Gonçalves' youth system, and became a professional with Grêmio. He moved to Germany to play for 1. FC Kaiserslautern but, due to adaptation problems, wanted to return to Brazil shortly after his move. Arílson initially tried to re-join Grêmio, but the club would not meet Kaiserslautern's asking price. Instead, he transferred to Grêmio's arch-rivals Internacional.

== International career ==
Arílson earned seven caps between late 1995 and early 1996 following his good showings with Grêmio, but it all came to an end at the 1996 CONMEBOL Pre-Olympic Tournament in which, being unused in his team's matches and wanting to rejoin Kaiserslautern for the 1995–96 DFB-Pokal semifinals, he attempted to request to be released from the national team, but was denied; still, he left Brazil's training camp in Tandil without permission and flew to Germany, only to find he could not rejoin his club until after the Pre-Olympic Tournament was over. His attitude incensed the Brazilian team manager, Mário Zagallo, who declared that Arílson would never earn another cap in retaliation.
