= Carlos Rendón =

Colombian footballer (born 1951)

Personal information
- Full name: Carlos Emilio Rendón Arango
- Date of birth: 19 September 1951 (age 75)
- Place of birth: Jardín, Colombia
- Position: Midfielder

International career
Years	Team	Apps	(Gls)
1975	Colombia	1	(0)

Carlos Emilio Rendón Arango (born 19 September 1951) is a Colombian footballer. He played in one match for the Colombia national football team in 1975. He was also part of Colombia's squad for the 1975 Copa América tournament.
