= Víctor Aristizábal =

Colombian footballer (born 1971)

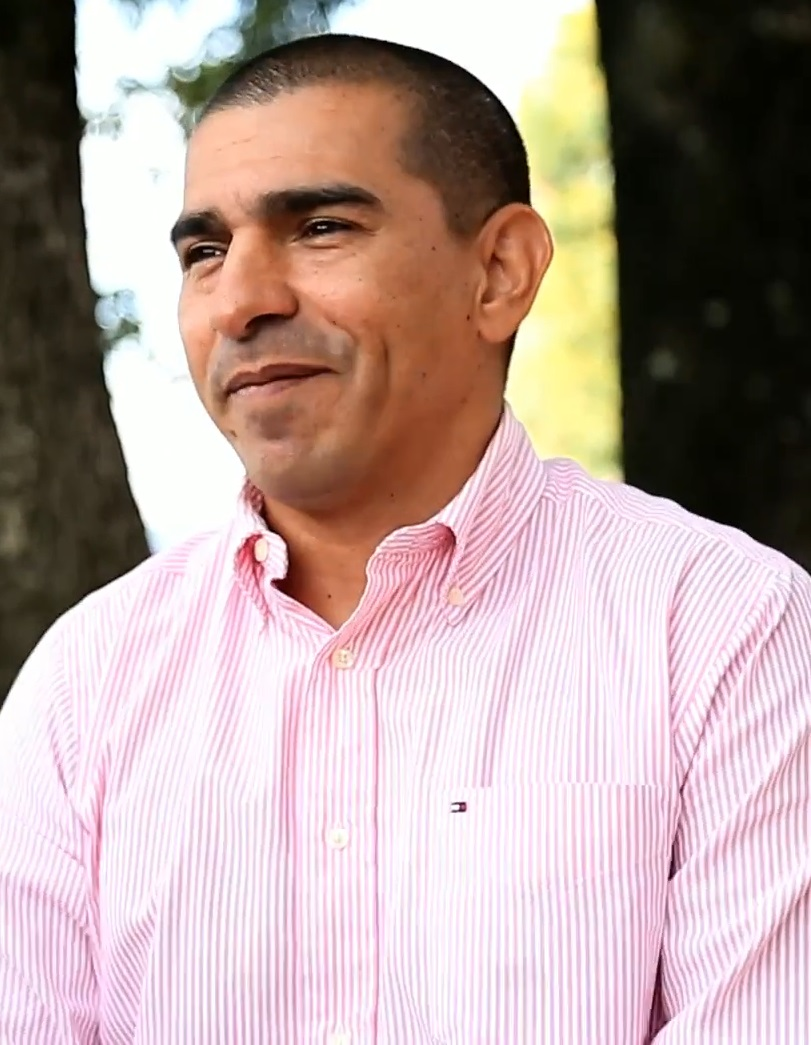

Personal information
- Full name: Víctor Hugo Aristizábal Posada
- Date of birth: 9 December 1971 (age 54)
- Place of birth: Medellín, Colombia
- Height: 1.74 m (5 ft 9 in)
- Position: Striker

Senior career*
Years	Team	Apps	(Gls)
1990–1994	Atlético Nacional	142	(70)
1994	Valencia	7	(0)
1994–1996	Atlético Nacional	38	(17)
1997–1998	São Paulo	25	(9)
1998–1999	Santos	11	(2)
1999–2000	Atlético Nacional	25	(13)
2000–2001	Deportivo Cali	28	(14)
2001–2002	Vitória	21	(10)
2002–2003	Cruzeiro	36	(21)
2003–2004	Coritiba	25	(6)
2004–2007	Atlético Nacional	85	(49)
Total		443	(211)

International career
1993–2003	Colombia	66	(15)
Medal record
Men's football
Representing Colombia
Copa América
Winner	2001 Colombia
- * Club domestic league appearances and goals

Víctor Hugo Aristizábal Posada (born 9 December 1971) is a Colombian retired professional footballer who played as a striker.

At the 2001 Copa América in his home country, he won the country's first international title with the Colombian selection and was the tournament's top scorer with 6 goals.

== Club career ==
Aristizábal was born in Medellín, Antioquia. He started his career in Atlético Nacional, and played there from 1990 to 1996 only interrupted by a short spell with Valencia CF in 1994. Winning the Colombian league twice with Nacional, he eventually moved to play in Brazil. He played for São Paulo and Santos before spending two seasons at Nacional and Deportivo Cali. In 2002, he once again moved to Brazil, and played for EC Vitória, Cruzeiro and Coritiba. Aristizábal is the all-time top foreign goalscorer in the Brazilian league. He is also the all-time Colombian goalscorer with 348 goals, of which about 200 goals were scored with Atlético Nacional, club which he is also the top goalscorer. He is the only player that has won six championship with Atlético Nacional. He announced his retirement from football in November 2007 after suffering an awkward knee injury.

== International career ==
Between 1993 and 2003, Aristizábal played 66 international matches and scored 15 goals for the Colombia national team. He was an unused substitute for the 1994 FIFA World Cup, but played all three matches at the 1998 FIFA World Cup.

Aristizábal finished as top scorer with six goals in the 2001 Copa América held in Colombia, as Los Cafeteros won the title for the first time. He was also a member of the nation's squad for the 2003 FIFA Confederations Cup, where they finished in fourth place.

During the 2006 FIFA World Cup qualification campaign, Aristizábal announced he was retiring from international soccer after being dropped for a match against Brazil.

== Personal life ==
Aristizábal's son, Emilio, is also a professional footballer, and currently plays for Atlético Nacional.

== Career statistics ==
=== Club ===
Appearances and goals by club, season and competition
Club	Season	League			Cup		Continental		Total	
Club	Season	Division	Apps	Goals	Apps	Goals	Apps	Goals	Apps	Goals
Atlético Nacional	1992	Categoría Primera A	–	–	0	0	9	6	9	6
Atlético Nacional	1993	Categoría Primera A	33	20	0	0	5	3	38	23
Atlético Nacional	Total		33	20	0	0	14	9	47	29
Valencia	1993–94	La Liga	7	0	0	0	0	0	7	0
Atlético Nacional	1994	Categoría Primera A	26	15	0	0	0	0	26	15
Atlético Nacional	1995	Categoría Primera A	12	2	0	0	12	7	24	9
Atlético Nacional	Total		38	17	0	0	12	7	50	24
São Paulo	1996	Série A	13	5	0	0	2+	2	15	7
São Paulo	1997	Série A	12	4	0	0	5+	4	17	8
São Paulo	Total		25	9	0	0	7	6	32	15
Santos	1998	Série A	4	1	0	0	0	0	4	1
Santos	1999	Série A	7	1	0	0	0	0	7	1
Santos	Total		11	2	0	0	0	0	11	2
Atlético Nacional	2000	Categoría Primera A	25	13	0	0	4	1	29	14
Deportivo Cali	2001	Categoría Primera A	28	14	0	0	3	1	31	15
Vitória	2002	Série A	21	10	0	0	0	0	21	10
Cruzeiro	2003	Série A	36	21	2+	5	1	0	39	26
Coritiba	2004	Série A	25	6	0	0	4	2	29	8
Atlético Nacional	2005	Categoría Primera A	31	25	0	0	5	2	36	27
Atlético Nacional	2006	Categoría Primera A	32	17	0	0	7	4	39	21
Atlético Nacional	2007	Categoría Primera A	22	7	0	0	4	1	26	8
Atlético Nacional	Total		85	49	0	0	16	7	101	56
Career total			334	161	2	5	61	23	397	189

=== International ===
Scores and results list Colombia's goal tally first, score column indicates score after each Aristizábal goal.

List of international goals scored by Víctor Aristizábal
No.	Date	Venue	Opponent	Score	Result	Competition
1	30 May 1993	Estadio Nacional Julio Martínez Prádanos, Santiago, Chile	Chile	1–0	1–1	Friendly
2	16 July 1993	Estadio 9 de Mayo, Machala, Ecuador	Mexico	2–1	2–1	1993 Copa América
3	9 February 1994	Prince Abdullah Al Faisal Stadium, Jeddah, Saudi Arabia	Saudi Arabia	1–0	1–0	Friendly
4	26 February 1994	Weingart Stadium, Monterey Park, United States	South Korea	2–2	2–2	Friendly
5	2 June 1996	Estadio Nacional, Lima, Perú	Peru	1–1	1–1	1998 FIFA World Cup qualification
6	16 June 1997	Estadio Ramón Tahuichi Aguilera, Santa Cruz, Bolivia	Costa Rica	4–1	4–1	1997 Copa América
7	11 July 2001	Estadio Metropolitano Roberto Meléndez, Barranquilla, Colombia	Venezuela	2–0	2–0	2001 Copa América
8	14 July 2001	Estadio Metropolitano Roberto Meléndez, Barranquilla, Colombia	Ecuador	1–0	1–0	2001 Copa América
9	17 July 2001	Estadio Metropolitano Roberto Meléndez, Barranquilla, Colombia	Chile	1–0	2–0	2001 Copa América
10	23 July 2001	Estadio Centenario, Armenia, Colombia	Peru	1–0	3–0	2001 Copa América
11	23 July 2001	Estadio Centenario, Armenia, Colombia	Peru	3–0	3–0	2001 Copa América
12	26 July 2001	Estadio Palogrande, Manizales, Colombia	Honduras	2–0	2–0	2001 Copa América
13	14 November 2001	Estadio Defensores del Chaco, Asunción, Paraguay	Paraguay	1–0	4–0	2002 FIFA World Cup qualification
14	14 November 2001	Estadio Defensores del Chaco, Asunción, Paraguay	Paraguay	2–0	4–0	2002 FIFA World Cup qualification
15	14 November 2001	Estadio Defensores del Chaco, Asunción, Paraguay	Paraguay	3–0	4–0	2002 FIFA World Cup qualification

== Honours ==
Atlético Nacional

- Fútbol Profesional Colombiano: 1991, 1994, 1999, 2005-I, 2007-I, 2007-II
- Copa Interamericana: 1990, 1995
- Copa Merconorte: 2000

São Paulo

- Campeonato Paulista: 1998

Santos

- Copa CONMEBOL: 1998

Vitória

- Campeonato Baiano: 2002

Cruzeiro

- Campeonato Brasileiro Série A: 2003
- Copa do Brasil: 2003
- Campeonato Mineiro: 2003

Coritiba

- Campeonato Paranaense: 2004

Colombia

- Copa América: 2001

Individual

- Copa América top scorer: 2001
- Colombian League top scorer: 2005-I

Preceded by Ronaldo and Rivaldo	Copa America Top Goalscorers; Copa América 2001	Succeeded by Adriano
