= Freddy León =

Colombian footballer (born 1970)

Personal information
- Date of birth: September 24, 1970 (age 56)
- Place of birth: Bogotá

Senior career*
Years	Team	Apps	(Gls)
1990-96	Millonarios F.C.		
1996-98	Deportes Tolima		
1998-2000	Millonarios F.C.		
2002-?	Centauros Villavicencio		
- Patriotas Boyacá
- Cortuluá
-2007	Tigres F.C.		

International career
1995	Colombia	8	(0)
- * Club domestic league appearances and goals

Freddy Alberto León Aristizábal (born 24 September 1970) is a retired Colombian football striker.

He was born in Bogotá. He spent the main part of his career in Millonarios from 1990 through 2000, except a spell in Deportes Tolima from 1996 through 1998. Between 2002 and 2007 he played short spells for lesser clubs; Centauros Villavicencio, Patriotas FC, Cortuluá and Expreso Rojo.

He was capped 8 times for Colombia national football team in 1995, including at the 1995 Copa América.
