= Ibrahim Salisú =

Ghanaian footballer

Personal information
- Date of birth: 1965 (age 60–61)
- Place of birth: Accra, Ghana
- Position: Attacking midfielder

Senior career*
Years	Team	Apps	(Gls)
1990 – 1991	Fortuna Sittard	0	(0)
1991 – 2000	Caracas FC	144	(50)
2000 - 2001	Deportivo Galicia	4	(0)
- * Club domestic league appearances and goals

Ibrahim Salisú (born 1965 in Accra) is a Ghanaian former footballer. He played for Caracas FC, as an attacking midfielder. He later played with Deportivo Galicia also in the Venezuelan Primera Division before retiring from football.
