= Gerson Díaz =

Venezuelan footballer (born 1972)

Personal information
- Date of birth: 11 February 1972 (age 54)
- Position: Midfielder

International career
Years	Team	Apps	(Gls)
1993–1997	Venezuela	25	(2)

Gerson Díaz (born 11 February 1972) is a Venezuelan former footballer. He played in 25 matches for the Venezuela national football team from 1993 to 1997. He was also part of Venezuela's squad for the 1995 Copa América tournament.

== Career statistics ==
=== International ===
Appearances and goals by national team and year
National team	Year	Apps	Goals
Venezuela	1993	2	0
Venezuela	1995	6	0
Venezuela	1996	8	1
Venezuela	1997	9	1
Total		25	2

Scores and results list Venezuela's goal tally first, score column indicates score after each Díaz goal.

List of international goals scored by Gerson Díaz
No.	Date	Venue	Opponent	Score	Result	Competition	Ref.
1	10 November 1996	National Stadium, Lima, Peru	Peru	1–3	1–4	1998 FIFA World Cup qualification	
2	19 February 1997	Eladio Rosabal Cordero Stadium, Heredia, Costa Rica	Costa Rica	1–1	2–5	Friendly	
