= Salvador Imperatore =

Chilean football referee

- Full name: Salvador Imperatore Marcone
- Born: 11 March 1950 (age 76); Chile
- Other occupation: Chemical engineer

Domestic
Years	League	Role

International
Years	League	Role

Salvador Imperatore Marcone (born 11 March 1950) is a Chilean former football referee. He officiated the opening match at the 1991 FIFA Women's World Cup, as well as the semi-final between the United States and Germany. He was later on call as a reserve official for the 1994 FIFA World Cup.

Imperatore also refereed at the 1993 FIFA U-17 World Championship, the 1995 Copa América and the 1995 King Fahd Cup. A chemical engineer by trade, Imperatore suffered a stroke in 2008.
