= 1989 Copa Libertadores finals =

- Event: 1989 Copa Libertadores
| Olimpia | Atlético Nacional |
| (Paraguay) | (Colombia) |
| 2 | 2 |
- on aggregate Atlético Nacional won 5–4 on penalties.

First leg
| Olimpia | Atlético Nacional |
| 2 | 0 |
- Date: 24 May 1989
- Venue: Defensores del Chaco, Asunción
- Referee: José Wright (Brazil)
- Attendance: 40,000

Second leg
| Atlético Nacional | Olimpia |
| 2 | 0 |
- Date: 31 May 1989
- Venue: El Campín, Bogotá
- Referee: Juan C. Loustau (Argentina)
- Attendance: 50,000

The 1989 Copa Libertadores final was a two-legged football match-up to determine the 1989 Copa Libertadores champion. After both finalists were tied on aggregate after the two legs, Atlético Nacional won the second leg 5–4 in the penalty shootout. The winner was finally determined after the two teams had taken a combined 18 penalties in the marathon second leg.

== Qualified teams ==
| Team | Previous finals app. |
|---|---|
| (Paraguay) Olimpia | 1960, 1979 |
| (Colombia) Atlético Nacional | None |

== Venues ==
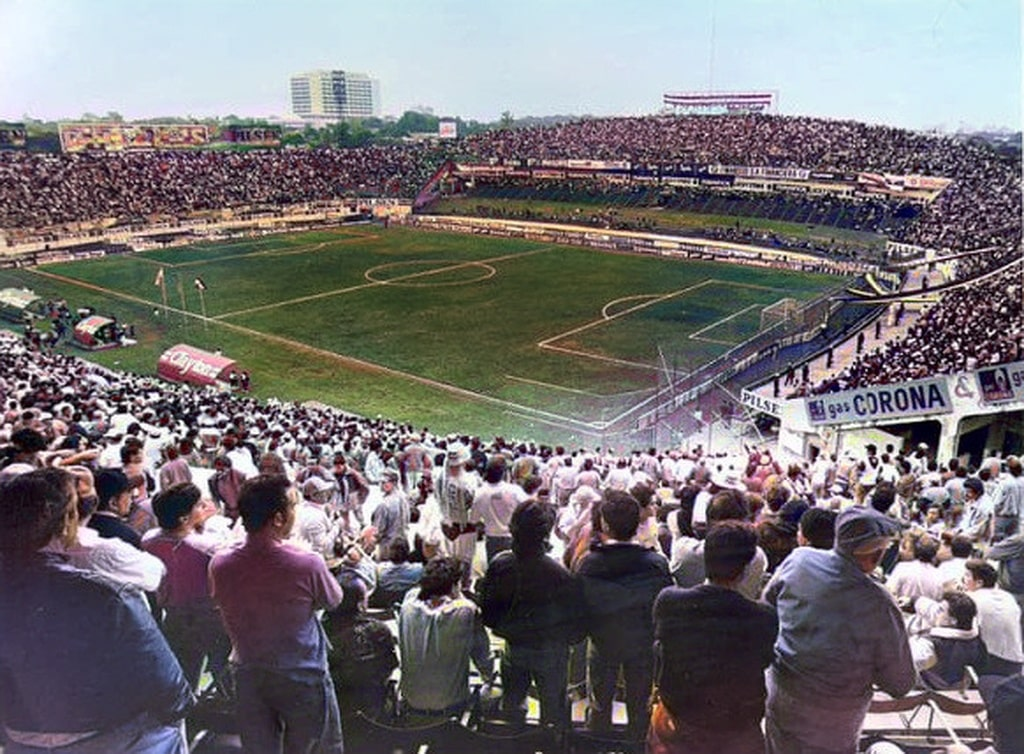
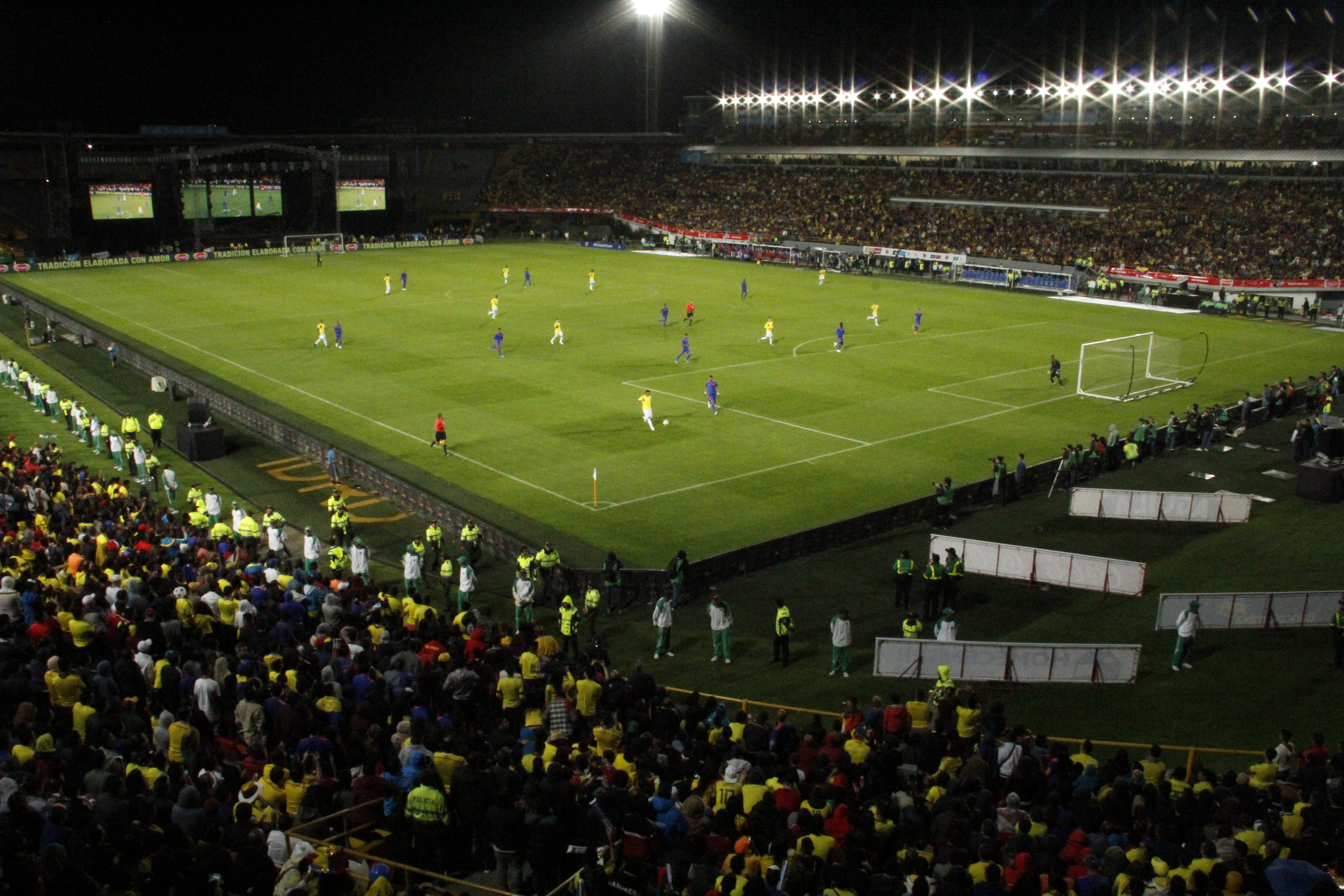
Defensores del Chaco (left) and El Campín, venues for the finals

== Match details ==
=== First leg ===
24 May 1989
21:10 (UTC-3)
First leg

| Olimpia (Paraguay) | 2–0 | (Colombia) Atlético Nacional |
|---|---|---|
| Bobadilla 36'; Sanabria 60' | Report |

Estadio Defensores del Chaco, Asunción
Attendance: 40,000
Referee: José Wright (Brazil)

| Olimpia | Atlético Nacional |

| GK | 1 | (Uruguay) Ever Almeida |
| DF | 13 | (Paraguay) Fidel Miño (c) |
| DF | 5 | (Paraguay) Gustavo Benítez |
| DF | 3 | (Paraguay) Herib Chamas |
| DF | 15 | (Argentina) Roberto Krausemann |
| MF | 6 | (Paraguay) Jorge Guasch |
| MF | 8 | (Paraguay) Vidal Sanabria | (substituted off) 65' |
| MF | 10 | (Paraguay) Rafael Bobadilla |
| FW | 24 | (Paraguay) Gustavo Neffa |
| FW | 9 | (Paraguay) Raúl Amarilla |
| FW | 11 | (Paraguay) Alfredo Mendoza | (substituted off) 46' |
Substitutes:
| FW | 7 | (Paraguay) Gabriel González | (substituted on) 46' |
| FW | 19 | (Paraguay) Fermín Balbuena | (substituted on) 65' |
Manager:
(Uruguay) Luis Cubilla

| GK | 1 | (Colombia) René Higuita (c) |
| DF | 5 | (Colombia) León Villa | (substituted off) 46' |
| DF | 15 | (Colombia) Luis Perea |
| DF | 2 | (Colombia) Andrés Escobar |
| DF | 3 | (Colombia) Gildardo Gómez |
| MF | 14 | (Colombia) Leonel Álvarez |
| MF | 8 | (Colombia) Alexis García |
| FW | 21 | (Colombia) Luis Fajardo |
| MF | 12 | (Colombia) Jaime Arango | (substituted off) 62' |
| FW | 19 | (Colombia) Albeiro Usuriaga |
| FW | 20 | (Colombia) Felipe Pérez |
Substitutes:
| DF | 18 | (Colombia) John Jairo Carmona | (substituted on) 46' |
| DF | 23 | (Colombia) Níver Arboleda | (substituted on) 62' |
Manager:
(Colombia) Francisco Maturana

=== Second leg ===
31 May 1989
Second leg

| Atlético Nacional (Colombia) | 2–0 | (Paraguay) Olimpia |
|---|---|---|
| Miño 46' (o.g.); Usuriaga 65' | Report |
Penalties
| Escobar (penalty scored); Usuriaga (penalty scored); Tréllez (penalty scored); García (penalty missed); Higuita (penalty scored); Pérez (penalty missed); Gómez (penalty missed); Perea (penalty missed); Álvarez (penalty scored) | 5–4 | (penalty missed) Almeida; (penalty scored) Benítez; (penalty scored) Chamas; (penalty scored) Mendoza; (penalty scored) Amarilla; (penalty missed) González; (penalty missed) Guasch; (penalty missed) Balbuena; (penalty missed) Sanabria |

Estadio El Campín, Bogotá
Attendance: 50,000
Referee: Juan Carlos Loustau (Argentina)

| Atlético Nacional | Olimpia |

| GK | 1 | (Colombia) René Higuita (c) |
| DF | 18 | (Colombia) John Jairo Carmona |
| DF | 15 | (Colombia) Luis Perea |
| DF | 2 | (Colombia) Andrés Escobar |
| DF | 3 | (Colombia) Gildardo Gómez |
| MF | 14 | (Colombia) Leonel Álvarez |
| MF | 8 | (Colombia) Alexis García |
| MF | 21 | (Colombia) Luis Fajardo | (substituted off) 85' |
| MF | 12 | (Colombia) Jaime Arango | (substituted off) 46' |
| FW | 19 | (Colombia) Albeiro Usuriaga |
| FW | 17 | (Colombia) John Jairo Tréllez |
Substitutes:
| FW | 20 | (Colombia) Felipe Pérez | (substituted on) 46' |
| DF | 23 | (Colombia) Níver Arboleda | (substituted on) 85' |
Manager:
(Colombia) Francisco Maturana

| GK | 1 | (Uruguay) Ever Almeida |
| DF | 13 | (Paraguay) Fidel Miño (c) |
| DF | 5 | (Paraguay) Gustavo Benítez |
| DF | 3 | (Paraguay) Herib Chamas |
| DF | 15 | (Argentina) Roberto Krausemann |
| MF | 6 | (Paraguay) Jorge Guasch |
| MF | 8 | (Paraguay) Vidal Sanabria |
| MF | 10 | (Paraguay) Rafael Bobadilla | (substituted off) 66' |
| FW | 24 | (Paraguay) Gustavo Neffa | (substituted off) 66' |
| FW | 9 | (Paraguay) Raúl Amarilla |
| FW | 11 | (Paraguay) Alfredo Mendoza |
Substitutes:
| FW | 19 | (Paraguay) Fermín Balbuena | (substituted on) 66' |
| FW | 7 | (Paraguay) Gabriel González | (substituted on) 66' |
Manager:
(Uruguay) Luis Cubilla
