= 1998 Copa Libertadores group stage =

The 1998 Copa Libertadores group stage was played from 25 February to 9 April 1998. A total of 20 teams competed in the group stage to decide 15 places in the final stages of the 1998 Copa Libertadores, where they joined defending champions Cruzeiro.

== Groups composition ==
Same as previous editions, the 20 participating teams were divided into 5 groups of 4, which consisted of two teams from one association and two teams from another. The paired associations for this edition were as follows:

- Group 1: Colombia and Ecuador
- Group 2: Brazil and Venezuela
- Group 3: Chile and Paraguay
- Group 4: Bolivia and Uruguay
- Group 5: Argentina and Peru

However, after the agreement reached between the Venezuelan Football Federation (FVF) and Mexican promoters close to the Mexican Football Federation (FMF), the two places corresponding to the FVF were put at stake in a previous tournament, called Pre-Libertadores, between the two Venezuelan teams that had previously qualified for this edition and two Mexican teams designated by the FMF. Mexican sides Guadalajara and Club América overcame Venezuelan sides Caracas and Atlético Zulia to qualify for group 2.

== Format ==
In the group stage, each group was played on a home-and-away round-robin basis. The teams were ranked according to the following criteria: 1. Points (3 points for a win, 1 point for a draw, and 0 points for a loss); 2. Goal difference; 3. Goals scored.

The winners, runners-up and third placed teams of each group advanced to the round of 16 of the final stages.

== Schedule ==
The match schedule of the group stage was announced by CONMEBOL on 12 December 1997.

Weeks	Dates	Group 1	Group 2	Group 3	Group 4	Group 5
Week 1	25 February 1998	COL1 v COL2, ECU1 v ECU2	—	PAR1 v PAR2, CHI2 v CHI1	BOL1 v BOL2, URU1 v URU2	—
Week 2	3, 4 and 6 March 1998	ECU2 v COL2, ECU1 v COL2	MEX2 v MEX1, BRA2 v BRA1	PAR2 v CHI1, PAR1 v CHI1	BOL2 v URU1, BOL1 v URU1	ARG2 v ARG1, PER1 v PER2
Week 3	10–13 March 1998	ECU2 v COL1, ECU1 v COL1	MEX2 v BRA2, MEX1 v BRA2	PAR2 v CHI2, PAR1 v CHI2	BOL2 v URU2, BOL1 v URU2	ARG2 v PER2, PER1 v ARG1
Week 4	17–20 March 1998	COL2 v COL1, ECU2 v ECU1	MEX2 v BRA1, MEX1 v BRA1	PAR2 v PAR1, CHI1 v CHI2	URU2 v URU1, BOL2 v BOL1	ARG2 v PER1, PER2 v ARG1
Week 5	24–27 March 1998	COL2 v ECU2, COL1 v ECU2	BRA1 v BRA2, MEX1 v MEX2	CHI2 v PAR2, CHI1 v PAR2	URU2 v BOL2, URU1 v BOL2	ARG1 v ARG2, PER2 v PER1
Week 6	31 March – 3 April 1998	COL2 v ECU1, COL1 v ECU1	BRA2 v MEX2, BRA1 v MEX2	CHI2 v PAR1, CHI1 v PAR1	URU2 v BOL1, URU1 v BOL1	PER1 v ARG2, ARG1 v PER2
Week 7	7–9 April 1998	—	BRA2 v MEX1, BRA1 v MEX1	—	—	PER2 v ARG2, ARG1 v PER1

== Groups ==
=== Group 1 ===
Pos	Team	Pld	W	D	L	GF	GA	GD	Pts	Qualification	AME	BSC	BUC	SDQ
1	(Colombia) América de Cali	6	3	2	1	10	5	+5	11	Round of 16	—	3–0	2–2	2–1
2	(Ecuador) Barcelona	6	2	3	1	5	3	+2	9	Round of 16	1–0	—	2–0	0–0
3	(Colombia) Atlético Bucaramanga	6	2	1	3	5	6	−1	7	Round of 16	0–1	2–0	—	2–0
4	(Ecuador) Deportivo Quito	6	1	2	3	3	9	−6	5		0–4	1–1	1–0	—

Legend: Blue = home team win; Yellow = draw; Red = away team win.
25 February 1998
--:-- UTC−5

Barcelona (Ecuador)	0–0	(Ecuador) Deportivo Quito
	Report

Estadio Monumental Isidro Romero Carbo, Guayaquil
Referee: Mauricio Reinoso (Ecuador)
25 February 1998
--:-- UTC−5

América de Cali (Colombia)	2–2	(Colombia) Atlético Bucaramanga
Moreno 27'; Pérez 44'	Report	Restrepo 67'; Galarcio 89'

Estadio Olímpico Pascual Guerrero, Cali
Attendance: 40,789
Referee: Flavio Rojas (Colombia)

3 March 1998
--:-- UTC−5

Deportivo Quito (Ecuador)	1–0	(Colombia) Atlético Bucaramanga
Soria 54' (pen.)	Report

Estadio Olímpico Atahualpa, Quito
Attendance: 20,000
Referee: Juan Luna (Bolivia)
6 March 1998
--:-- UTC−5

Barcelona (Ecuador)	2–0	(Colombia) Atlético Bucaramanga
Arias 11'; Asencio 44'	Report

Estadio Monumental Isidro Romero Carbo, Guayaquil
Attendance: 20,000
Referee: René Ortube (Bolivia)

10 March 1998
--:-- UTC−5

Deportivo Quito (Ecuador)	0–4	(Colombia) América de Cali
	Report	Ortegón 5'; González 29'; Pérez 34', 80'

Estadio Olímpico Atahualpa, Quito
Attendance: 15,000
Referee: José Arana (Peru)
13 March 1998
--:-- UTC−5

Barcelona (Ecuador)	1–0	(Colombia) América de Cali
Asprilla 4' (o.g.)	Report

Estadio Monumental Isidro Romero Carbo, Guayaquil
Attendance: 60,000
Referee: Alberto Tejada (Peru)

18 March 1998
--:-- UTC−5

Deportivo Quito (Ecuador)	1–1	(Ecuador) Barcelona
Burbano 27'	Report	Delgado 70'

Estadio Olímpico Atahualpa, Quito
Attendance: 20,000
Referee: Ángel Guevara (Ecuador)
18 March 1998
--:-- UTC−5

Atlético Bucaramanga (Colombia)	0–1	(Colombia) América de Cali
	Report	Cardona 48'

Estadio Alfonso López Pumarejo, Bogotá
Attendance: 6,000
Referee: Julián Idarraga (Colombia)

24 March 1998
--:-- UTC−5

Atlético Bucaramanga (Colombia)	2–0	(Ecuador) Deportivo Quito
Restrepo 66'; España 85'	Report

Estadio Alfonso López Pumarejo, Bogotá
Attendance: 4,000
Referee: Luis Solorzano (Venezuela)
27 March 1998
--:-- UTC−5

América de Cali (Colombia)	2–1	(Ecuador) Deportivo Quito
Hurtado 65'; Castillo 88'	Report	Lell 85'

Estadio Olímpico Pascual Guerrero, Cali
Attendance: 7,500
Referee: Rafael Torrealba (Venezuela)

31 March 1998
--:-- UTC−5

Atlético Bucaramanga (Colombia)	1–0	(Ecuador) Barcelona
Gómez 39'	Report

Estadio Alfonso López Pumarejo, Bogotá
Referee: Oscar Sequeira (Argentina)
3 April 1998
--:-- UTC−5

América de Cali (Colombia)	1–1	(Ecuador) Barcelona
González 61'	Report	Sotelo 29'

Estadio Olímpico Pascual Guerrero, Cali
Referee: Daniel Giménez (Argentina)

=== Group 2 ===
Pos	Team	Pld	W	D	L	GF	GA	GD	Pts	Qualification	GRE	VAS	AME	GUA
1	(Brazil) Grêmio	6	4	0	2	6	5	+1	12	Round of 16	—	1–0	1–0	2–0
2	(Brazil) Vasco da Gama	6	2	2	2	7	4	+3	8	Round of 16	3–0	—	1–1	2–0
3	(Mexico) América	6	2	2	2	6	5	+1	8	Round of 16	1–2	1–1	—	2–0
4	(Mexico) Guadalajara	6	2	0	4	2	7	−5	6		1–0	1–0	0–1	—

Legend: Blue = home team win; Yellow = draw; Red = away team win.
4 March 1998
--:-- UTC−6

Guadalajara (Mexico)	0–1	(Mexico) América
	Report	García Aspe 63' (pen.)

Estadio Jalisco, Guadalajara
Attendance: 40,000
Referee: Óscar Ruiz (Colombia)
4 March 1998
--:-- UTC−3

Grêmio (Brazil)	1–0	(Brazil) Vasco da Gama
Guilherme 62'	Report

Estádio Olímpico Monumental, Porto Alegre
Attendance: 50,032
Referee: Márcio Rezende (Brazil)

10 March 1998
--:-- UTC−6

Guadalajara (Mexico)	1–0	(Brazil) Grêmio
Arellano 67'	Report

Estadio Jalisco, Guadalajara
Attendance: 30,000
Referee: Daniel Giménez (Argentina)
13 March 1998
--:-- UTC−6

América (Mexico)	1–2	(Brazil) Grêmio
Zárate 28'	Report	Guilherme 15'; Beto 69'

Estadio Azteca, Mexico City
Attendance: 15,000
Referee: Roberto Ruscio (Argentina)

17 March 1998
--:-- UTC−6

Guadalajara (Mexico)	1–0	(Brazil) Vasco da Gama
Ramírez 45'	Report

Estadio Jalisco, Guadalajara
Attendance: 25,000
Referee: Robert Troxler (Paraguay)
20 March 1998
--:-- UTC−6

América (Mexico)	1–1	(Brazil) Vasco da Gama
Cedrés 2'	Report	Menezes 6'

Estadio Azteca, Mexico City
Attendance: 10,000
Referee: Ubaldo Aquino (Paraguay)

24 March 1998
--:-- UTC−6

América (Mexico)	2–0	(Mexico) Guadalajara
Peláez 4'; Cedrés 55'	Report

Estadio Azteca, Mexico City
Attendance: 85,000
Referee: René Ortube (Bolivia)
26 March 1998
--:-- UTC−3

Vasco da Gama (Brazil)	3–0	(Brazil) Grêmio
Luizão 33', 42'; Donizete 55'	Report

Estádio São Januário, Rio de Janeiro
Attendance: 15,520
Referee: Wilson de Souza Mendonça (Brazil)

31 March 1998
--:-- UTC−3

Grêmio (Brazil)	2–0	(Mexico) Guadalajara
Ronaldinho 46'; Beto 56'	Report

Estádio Olímpico Monumental, Porto Alegre
Attendance: 18,587
Referee: Daniel Bello (Uruguay)
3 April 1998
--:-- UTC−3

Vasco da Gama (Brazil)	2–0	(Mexico) Guadalajara
Luizão 68', 80'	Report

Estádio São Januário, Rio de Janeiro
Attendance: 9,701
Referee: Jorge Larrionda (Uruguay)

7 April 1998
--:-- UTC−3

Grêmio (Brazil)	1–0	(Mexico) América
Dário 67'	Report

Estádio Olímpico Monumental, Porto Alegre
Attendance: 13,880
Referee: Ángel Guevara (Ecuador)
9 April 1998
--:-- UTC−3

Vasco da Gama (Brazil)	1–1	(Mexico) América
Richardson 71'	Report	García Aspe 10'

Estádio São Januário, Rio de Janeiro
Attendance: 627
Referee: Byron Moreno (Ecuador)

=== Group 3 ===
Pos	Team	Pld	W	D	L	GF	GA	GD	Pts	Qualification	OLI	C-C	CCP	UCA
1	(Paraguay) Olimpia	6	4	1	1	14	6	+8	13	Round of 16	—	1–1	5–1	2–0
2	(Chile) Colo-Colo	6	2	1	3	8	10	−2	7	Round of 16	1–3	—	1–2	3–2
3	(Paraguay) Cerro Porteño	6	2	1	3	6	9	−3	7	Round of 16	1–2	2–0	—	0–0
4	(Chile) Universidad Católica	6	2	1	3	5	8	−3	7		2–1	0–2	1–0	—

Legend: Blue = home team win; Yellow = draw; Red = away team win.
25 February 1998
--:-- UTC−3

Olimpia (Paraguay)	5–1	(Paraguay) Cerro Porteño
Monzón 30'; Caballero 41'; González 69'; Avalos 71'; Valdez 87'	Report	Ovelar 83'

Estadio Defensores del Chaco, Asunción
Attendance: 15,000
Referee: Carlos Amarilla (Paraguay)
25 February 1998
--:-- UTC−3

Colo-Colo (Chile)	3–2	(Chile) Universidad Católica
Neira 4', 65'; Espina 83'	Report	Bisconti 18'; Goldberg 68'

Estadio Monumental David Arellano, Santiago
Attendance: 19,499
Referee: Guido Aros (Chile)

3 March 1998
--:-- UTC−3

Cerro Porteño (Paraguay)	0–0	(Chile) Universidad Católica
	Report

Estadio Defensores del Chaco, Asunción
Attendance: 10,000
Referee: Gustavo Méndez (Uruguay)
6 March 1998
--:-- UTC−3

Olimpia (Paraguay)	2–0	(Chile) Universidad Católica
Valdez 44'; Zelaya 54'	Report

Estadio Manuel Ferreira, Asunción
Attendance: 20,000
Referee: José da Rosa (Uruguay)

10 March 1998
--:-- UTC−3

Cerro Porteño (Paraguay)	2–0	(Chile) Colo-Colo
Ovelar 83'; Gavilán 90'	Report

Estadio Defensores del Chaco, Asunción
Attendance: 5,000
Referee: Horacio Elizondo (Argentina)
13 March 1998
--:-- UTC−3

Olimpia (Paraguay)	1–1	(Chile) Colo-Colo
González 12'	Report	Vergara 76'

Estadio Defensores del Chaco, Asunción
Attendance: 15,000
Referee: Javier Castrilli (Argentina)

18 March 1998
--:-- UTC−3

Cerro Porteño (Paraguay)	1–2	(Paraguay) Olimpia
Ovelar 37' (pen.)	Report	Paredes 57'; Monzón 73'

Estadio Defensores del Chaco, Asunción
Attendance: 20,000
Referee: Ricardo Grance (Paraguay)
18 March 1998
--:-- UTC−4

Universidad Católica (Chile)	0–2	(Chile) Colo-Colo
	Report	Tapia 19', 28'

Estadio San Carlos de Apoquindo, Santiago
Attendance: 18,000
Referee: Cristian Lemus (Chile)

24 March 1998
--:-- UTC−4

Universidad Católica (Chile)	1–0	(Paraguay) Cerro Porteño
Moya 83'	Report

Estadio San Carlos de Apoquindo, Santiago
Attendance: 6,000
Referee: Sidrack Marinho dos Santos (Brazil)
27 March 1998
--:-- UTC−4

Colo-Colo (Chile)	1–2	(Paraguay) Cerro Porteño
Tapia 35'	Report	Fernández 9'; Ovelar 69'

Estadio Monumental David Arellano, Santiago
Attendance: 9,496
Referee: Dacildo Mourão (Brazil)

31 March 1998
--:-- UTC−4

Universidad Católica (Chile)	2–1	(Paraguay) Olimpia
Pérez 45'; Bisconti 60'	Report	Monzón 62'

Estadio San Carlos de Apoquindo, Santiago
Attendance: 9,000
Referee: Antônio Pereira (Brazil)
3 April 1998
--:-- UTC−4

Colo-Colo (Chile)	1–3	(Paraguay) Olimpia
Vergara 71'	Report	Zelaya 2'; Monzón 8'; Franco 90'

Estadio Monumental David Arellano, Santiago
Attendance: 7,000
Referee: Wilson Souza Mendonça (Brazil)

=== Group 4 ===
Pos	Team	Pld	W	D	L	GF	GA	GD	Pts	Qualification	BOL	PEÑ	NAC	OPE
1	(Bolivia) Bolívar	6	4	1	1	9	7	+2	13	Round of 16	—	2–0	1–0	3–2
2	(Uruguay) Peñarol	6	3	1	2	12	5	+7	10	Round of 16	0–1	—	2–1	6–1
3	(Uruguay) Nacional	6	2	0	4	11	12	−1	6	Round of 16	4–1	1–4	—	4–1
4	(Bolivia) Oriente Petrolero	6	1	2	3	7	15	−8	5		1–1	0–0	2–1	—

Legend: Blue = home team win; Yellow = draw; Red = away team win.
25 February 1998
--:-- UTC−4

Bolívar (Bolivia)	3–2	(Bolivia) Oriente Petrolero
Sérgio João 6', 78'; Cristaldo 71'	Report	Rentera 27'; Peña 55'

Estadio Hernando Siles, La Paz
Attendance: 20,000
Referee: Juan Paniagua (Bolivia)
25 February 1998
--:-- UTC−3

Peñarol (Uruguay)	2–1	(Uruguay) Nacional
Bengoechea 39'; González 75'	Report	Ramírez 63'

Estadio Domingo Burgueño, Maldonado
Attendance: 22,000
Referee: Daniel Bello (Uruguay)

3 March 1998
--:-- UTC−4

Oriente Petrolero (Bolivia)	0–0	(Uruguay) Peñarol
	Report

Estadio Ramón Tahuichi Aguilera, Santa Cruz de la Sierra
Attendance: 23,000
Referee: Bonifacio Núñez (Paraguay)
6 March 1998
--:-- UTC−4

Bolívar (Bolivia)	1–0	(Uruguay) Peñarol
Sérgio João 70'	Report

Estadio Hernando Siles, La Paz
Attendance: 40,000
Referee: Robert Troxler (Paraguay)

10 March 1998
--:-- UTC−4

Oriente Petrolero (Bolivia)	2–1	(Uruguay) Nacional
Osvaldinho 67'; Edú Monteiro 84'	Report	Baltierra 31'

Estadio Ramón Tahuichi Aguilera, Santa Cruz de la Sierra
Attendance: 15,000
Referee: Cristian Lemus (Chile)
13 March 1998
--:-- UTC−4

Bolívar (Bolivia)	2–0	(Uruguay) Nacional
Sérgio João 16', 78'	Report

Estadio Hernando Siles, La Paz
Attendance: 32,000
Referee: Jaime Toro (Chile)

18 March 1998
--:-- UTC−4

Oriente Petrolero (Bolivia)	1–1	(Bolivia) Bolívar
Edú Monteiro 14'	Report	Sérgio João 20'

Estadio Ramón Tahuichi Aguilera, Santa Cruz de la Sierra
Attendance: 32,000
Referee: Juan Carlos Lugones (Bolivia)
18 March 1998
--:-- UTC−3

Nacional (Uruguay)	1–4	(Uruguay) Peñarol
Lemos 42'	Report	Romero 8'; Pandiani 22', 73'; Herrera 51'

Estadio Centenario, Montevideo
Attendance: 28,000
Referee: José da Rosa (Uruguay)

24 March 1998
--:-- UTC−3

Nacional (Uruguay)	4–1	(Bolivia) Oriente Petrolero
Delgado 2'; Álvez 39'; Regueiro 68'; Núñez 78'	Report	Néne 35'

Estadio Centenario, Montevideo
Attendance: 15,000
Referee: Fabián Madorrán (Argentina)
27 March 1998
--:-- UTC−3

Peñarol (Uruguay)	6–1	(Bolivia) Oriente Petrolero
Franco 4', 58', 60', 83'; Pacheco 27'; García 44'	Report	Edú Monteiro 14'

Estadio Atilio Paiva Olivera, Rivera
Attendance: 6,000
Referee: Ángel Sánchez (Argentina)

31 March 1998
--:-- UTC−3

Peñarol (Uruguay)	0–1	(Bolivia) Bolívar
	Report	Sandy 8'

Estadio Atilio Paiva Olivera, Rivera
Attendance: 15,000
Referee: Oscar Roberto Godói (Brazil)
3 April 1998
--:-- UTC−3

Nacional (Uruguay)	4–1	(Bolivia) Bolívar
Núñez 12', 40'; Regueiro 47', 86'	Report	Sérgio João 30'

Estadio Centenario, Montevideo
Attendance: 23,000
Referee: Jorge Travassos (Brazil)

=== Group 5 ===
Pos	Team	Pld	W	D	L	GF	GA	GD	Pts	Qualification	RIV	ALI	COL	SCR
1	(Argentina) River Plate	6	5	1	0	15	6	+9	16	Round of 16	—	2–0	4–1	3–1
2	(Peru) Alianza Lima	6	2	1	3	5	7	−2	7	Round of 16	1–1	—	1–0	1–0
3	(Argentina) Colón	6	2	1	3	5	8	−3	7	Round of 16	1–2	1–0	—	1–0
4	(Peru) Sporting Cristal	6	1	1	4	7	11	−4	4		2–3	3–2	1–1	—

Legend: Blue = home team win; Yellow = draw; Red = away team win.
4 March 1998
--:-- UTC−5

Alianza Lima (Peru)	1–0	(Peru) Sporting Cristal
Sáenz 44'	Report

Estadio Alejandro Villanueva, Lima
Attendance: 25,000
Referee: Víctor Mayorga (Peru)
4 March 1998
--:-- UTC−3

Colón (Argentina)	1–2	(Argentina) River Plate
Sorín 90' (o.g.)	Report	Ayala 25'; Escudero 54'

Estadio Brigadier General Estanislao López, Santa Fe
Attendance: 32,000
Referee: Roberto Ruscio (Argentina)

11 March 1998
--:-- UTC−3

Colón (Argentina)	1–0	(Peru) Sporting Cristal
Agoglia 90'	Report

Estadio Brigadier General Estanislao López, Santa Fe
Attendance: 22,000
Referee: Luis Peña (Chile)
12 March 1998
--:-- UTC−5

Alianza Lima (Peru)	1–1	(Argentina) River Plate
Sáenz 57'	Report	Ángel 62'

Estadio Alejandro Villanueva, Lima
Attendance: 42,500
Referee: Byron Moreno (Ecuador)

18 March 1998
20:00 UTC−3

Colón (Argentina)	1–0	(Peru) Alianza Lima
Sandoval 79'	Report

Estadio Brigadier General Estanislao López, Santa Fe
Attendance: 24,000
Referee: Saúl Feldmann (Uruguay)
19 March 1998
--:-- UTC−5

Sporting Cristal (Peru)	2–3	(Argentina) River Plate
Ferreira 38'; Mendoza 72'	Report	Ángel 44', 75'; Escudero 53'

Estadio Nacional, Lima
Attendance: 14,000
Referee: Óscar Ruiz (Colombia)

25 March 1998
--:-- UTC−5

Sporting Cristal (Peru)	3–2	(Peru) Alianza Lima
Nilson 29'; Mendoza 35', 56'	Report	Jayo 32'; Bazalar 43'

Estadio Nacional, Lima
Attendance: 7,216
Referee: Jorge Luis Torres (Peru)
25 March 1998
--:-- UTC−3

River Plate (Argentina)	4–1	(Argentina) Colón
Ángel 5', 71'; Cardetti 56', 81'	Report	Saralegui 22'

Estadio Monumental, Buenos Aires
Attendance: 18,000
Referee: Daniel Giménez (Argentina)

1 April 1998
20:00 UTC−5

Alianza Lima (Peru)	1–0	(Argentina) Colón
Bazalar 68'	Report

Estadio Nacional, Lima
Attendance: 19,441
Referee: Paolo Borgosano (Venezuela)
2 April 1998
--:-- UTC−3

River Plate (Argentina)	3–1	(Peru) Sporting Cristal
Gallardo 9'; Rambert 54'; Cardetti 85'	Report	Nilson 25'

Estadio Monumental, Buenos Aires
Attendance: 11,000
Referee: Eduardo Gamboa (Chile)

8 April 1998
--:-- UTC−5

Sporting Cristal (Peru)	1–1	(Argentina) Colón
Soto 85'	Report	Sandoval 72'

Estadio Nacional, Lima
Referee: René Ortube (Bolivia)
9 April 1998
--:-- UTC−3

River Plate (Argentina)	2–0	(Peru) Alianza Lima
Aimar 50'; Figueroa 59'	Report

Estadio Monumental, Buenos Aires
Attendance: 3,000
Referee: Epifanio González (Paraguay)
