= 1988 Rous Cup =

Tournament details
- Dates: 17–24 May
- Teams: 3 (from 2 confederations)
- Venues: 2 (in 2 host cities)

Final positions
- Champions: England
- Runners-up: Colombia
- Third place: Scotland

Tournament statistics
- Matches played: 3
- Goals scored: 3 (1 per match)
- Attendance: 116,723 (38,908 per match)

The 1988 Rous Cup was the fourth staging of the Rous Cup international football competition, based around the England–Scotland football rivalry. For the second year in succession, a third team was invited to create a three-team tournament.

After having Brazil's participation in the previous year, the FA again invited South American opposition to participate, this time Colombia.

England won the competition for a second time after being the only team to win a game; the two other matches ended in draws.

== Results ==
All times listed are British Summer Time (UTC+1)

=== Scotland vs Colombia ===
17 May 1988
20:00

Scotland	0–0	Colombia
	Report

Hampden Park, Glasgow
Attendance: 20,487
Referee: Vítor Correia (Portugal)

SCOTLAND:
GK	1	Jim Leighton (Aberdeen)
DF	2	Richard Gough (Rangers)
DF	3	Steve Nicol (Liverpool)
MF	4	Roy Aitken (Celtic) (c)
DF	5	Alex McLeish (Aberdeen)
DF	6	Willie Miller (Aberdeen)	(substituted off) 67'
MF	7	Kevin Gallacher (Dundee United)
MF	8	Paul McStay (Celtic)	(substituted off) 58'
FW	9	Ally McCoist (Rangers)
MF	10	Murdo MacLeod (Borussia Dortmund)
FW	11	Mo Johnston (Nantes)
Substitutions:
MF		Derek Ferguson (Rangers)	(substituted on) 58'
FW		Andy Walker (Celtic)	(substituted on) 67'
Manager:
Andy Roxburgh

COLOMBIA:
GK	1	René Higuita (Atlético Nacional)
DF	2	Luis Fernando Herrera (Atlético Nacional)
DF	3	Luis Carlos Perea (Atlético Nacional)
DF	4	Andrés Escobar (Atlético Nacional)
DF	5	Carlos Hoyos (América)
MF	6	Bernardo Redín (Deportivo Cali)
MF	7	Leonel Álvarez (Atlético Nacional)
MF	8	Alexis García (Atlético Nacional)
MF	9	Carlos Valderrama (Deportivo Cali) (c)
FW	10	Arnoldo Iguarán (Millonarios)
FW	11	John Jairo Tréllez (Atlético Nacional)	(substituted off) 68'
Substitutions:
MF		Jaime Arango (Atlético Nacional)	(substituted on) 68'
Manager:
Francisco Maturana

=== England vs Scotland ===
21 May 1988
15:00

England	1–0	Scotland
Beardsley 12'	Report

Wembley Stadium, London
Attendance: 70,480
Referee: Joël Quiniou (France)

ENGLAND:
GK	1	Peter Shilton (Derby County)
DF	2	Gary Stevens (Everton)
DF	3	Kenny Sansom (Arsenal)
MF	4	Neil Webb (Nottingham Forest)
DF	5	Dave Watson (Everton)
DF	6	Tony Adams (Arsenal)
MF	7	Bryan Robson (Manchester United) (c)
MF	8	Trevor Steven (Everton)	(substituted off) 72'
FW	9	Peter Beardsley (Liverpool)
FW	10	Gary Lineker (Barcelona)
MF	11	John Barnes (Liverpool)
Substitutions:
MF		Chris Waddle (Tottenham Hotspur)	(substituted on) 72'
Manager:
Bobby Robson

SCOTLAND:
GK	1	Jim Leighton (Aberdeen)
DF	2	Richard Gough (Rangers)
DF	3	Steve Nicol (Liverpool)
MF	4	Roy Aitken (Celtic) (c)
DF	5	Alex McLeish (Aberdeen)
DF	6	Willie Miller (Aberdeen)	(substituted off) 74'
MF	7	Neil Simpson (Aberdeen)
MF	8	Paul McStay (Celtic)	(substituted off) 77'
FW	9	Ally McCoist (Rangers)
MF	10	Murdo MacLeod (Borussia Dortmund)
FW	11	Mo Johnston (Nantes)
Substitutions:
MF		Tommy Burns (Celtic)	(substituted on) 74'
FW		Kevin Gallacher (Dundee United)	(substituted on) 77'
Manager:
Andy Roxburgh

=== England vs Colombia ===
24 May 1988
20:00

England	1–1	Colombia
Lineker 22'	Report	Escobar 66'

Wembley Stadium, London
Attendance: 25,756
Referee: Karl-Josef Assenmacher (West Germany)

ENGLAND:
GK	1	Peter Shilton (Derby County)
DF	2	Viv Anderson (Manchester United)
DF	3	Kenny Sansom (Arsenal)
MF	4	Steve McMahon (Liverpool)
DF	5	Mark Wright (Derby County)
DF	6	Tony Adams (Arsenal)
MF	7	Bryan Robson (Manchester United) (c)
MF	8	Chris Waddle (Tottenham Hotspur)	(substituted off) 73'
FW	9	Peter Beardsley (Liverpool)
FW	10	Gary Lineker (Barcelona)
MF	11	John Barnes (Liverpool)	(substituted off) 73'
Substitutions:
MF		Glenn Hoddle (AS Monaco)	(substituted on) 73'
FW		Mark Hateley (AS Monaco)	(substituted on) 73'
Manager:
Bobby Robson

COLOMBIA:
GK	1	René Higuita (Atlético Nacional)
DF	2	Luis Fernando Herrera (Atlético Nacional)
DF	3	Luis Carlos Perea (Atlético Nacional)
DF	4	Andrés Escobar (Atlético Nacional)
DF	5	Carlos Hoyos (América)
MF	6	Bernardo Redín (Deportivo Cali)
MF	7	Leonel Álvarez (Atlético Nacional)
MF	8	Alexis García (Atlético Nacional)
MF	9	Carlos Valderrama (Deportivo Cali) (c)
FW	10	Arnoldo Iguarán (Millonarios)	Substituted off
FW	11	Jaime Arango (Atlético Nacional)	Substituted off
Substitutions:
FW		John Jairo Tréllez (Atlético Nacional)	Substituted on
MF		Didí (Atlético Nacional)	Substituted on
Manager:
Francisco Maturana

== Final standings ==
Team	Pld	W	D	L	GF	GA	GD	Pts
England	2	1	1	0	2	1	+1	3
Colombia	2	0	2	0	1	1	0	2
Scotland	2	0	1	1	0	1	–1	1

1988 Rous Cup
tournament winners

England

== Goalscorers ==
1 goal

- (Colombia) Andrés Escobar
- (England) Peter Beardsley
- (England) Gary Lineker
