= Lucio España =

Colombian footballer (1971-2005)

Personal information
- Full name: Lucio Fernando España López
- Date of birth: 29 October 1971
- Place of birth: Colombia
- Date of death: 2 June 2005 (aged 33)
- Place of death: Jamundí, Colombia
- Position: Defender

Senior career*
Years	Team	Apps	(Gls)
1994	Quindío	21	(0)
1995	Cortuluá	23	(6)
1996–1998	Bucaramanga	?	(?)
1996	Pereira	?	(?)
1999	Nacional	19	(0)
2000	Atlético Junior	19	(1)
- * Club domestic league appearances and goals

Lucio Fernando España López (29 October 1971 — 2 June 2005) was a Colombian footballer. The defender helped Atlético Nacional win the national league title in 1999, and also played for Atlético Bucaramanga, Real Cartagena, Atlético Junior, Deportes Quindío and Deportivo Pereira.

== Career ==
España played well for Cortuluá during 1995, but a move to Deportivo Cali fell through after he failed a physical before the 1996–97 season began.

In 1999, España joined Atlético Nacional from Atlético Bucaramanga.

== Personal ==
On 2 June 2005, España was shot by two thieves while picking up a nephew from a football field in Jamundí. A number of Colombian footballers have been shot the last 20 years, the most notable being Andrés Escobar. Other firearms victims include former Atlético Nacional players Albeiro Usuriaga, who was killed in Cali one year earlier, Omar Cañas, Martin Zapata, Elson Becerra, Jairo Zulbarán and Felipe Pérez Urrea.
