= 1989 Copa Interamericana =

- Event: Copa Interamericana
Atlético Nacional	UNAM
(Colombia)	(Mexico)
6	1
- (Atl. Nacional won 4–0 on points)

First leg
Atlético Nacional	UNAM
2	0
- Date: July 25, 1990
- Venue: Atanasio Girardot, Medellín
- Referee: Jorge Orellana (Ecuador)
- Attendance: 26,300

Second leg
UNAM	Atlético Nacional
1	4
- Date: August 1, 1990
- Venue: Olímpico Universitario, Mexico City
- Referee: Juan P. Escobar (Guatemala)
- Attendance: 30,000

The 1989 Copa Interamericana was the 12th. edition of the Copa Interamericana. The final was contested by Colombian club Atlético Nacional (champion of 1989 Copa Libertadores) and Mexican club Club Universidad Nacional (mostly known as "UNAM", winner of 1989 CONCACAF Champions' Cup). The final was played under a two-leg format in July–August 1990.

The first leg was held in Atanasio Girardot Stadium in Medellín, where Atlético beat UNAM 2–0. The second leg was played at Estadio Olímpico Universitario in Mexico City, where Atlético easily defeat the Pumas with a conclusive 4–1. Thus, the Colombian side won their first Copa Interamericana trophy.

== Qualified teams ==
Team	Qualification	Previous app.
(Colombia) Atlético Nacional	1989 Copa Libertadores winner	(None)
(Mexico) UNAM	1989 CONCACAF Champions' Cup winner	1980

== Venues ==
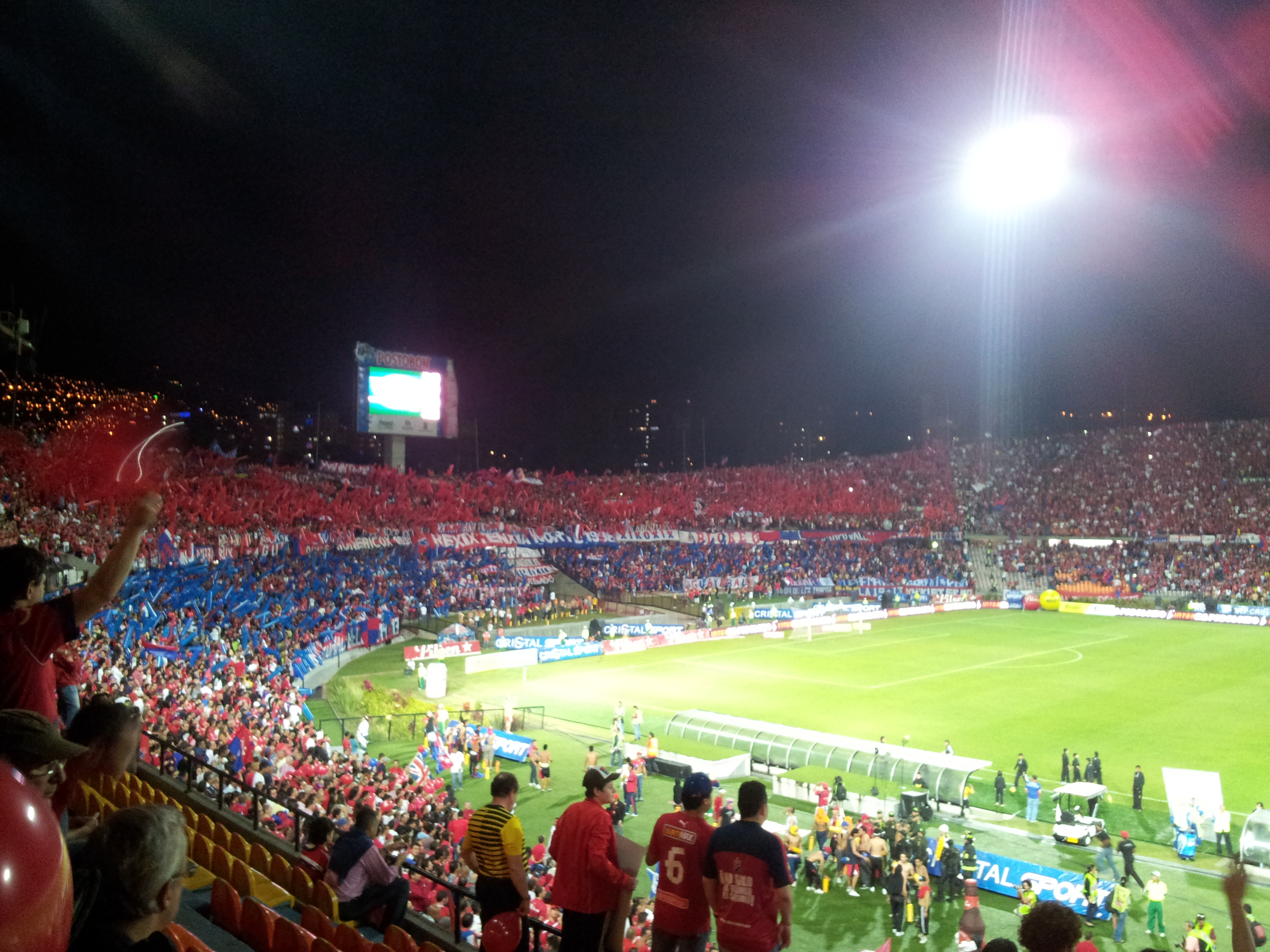
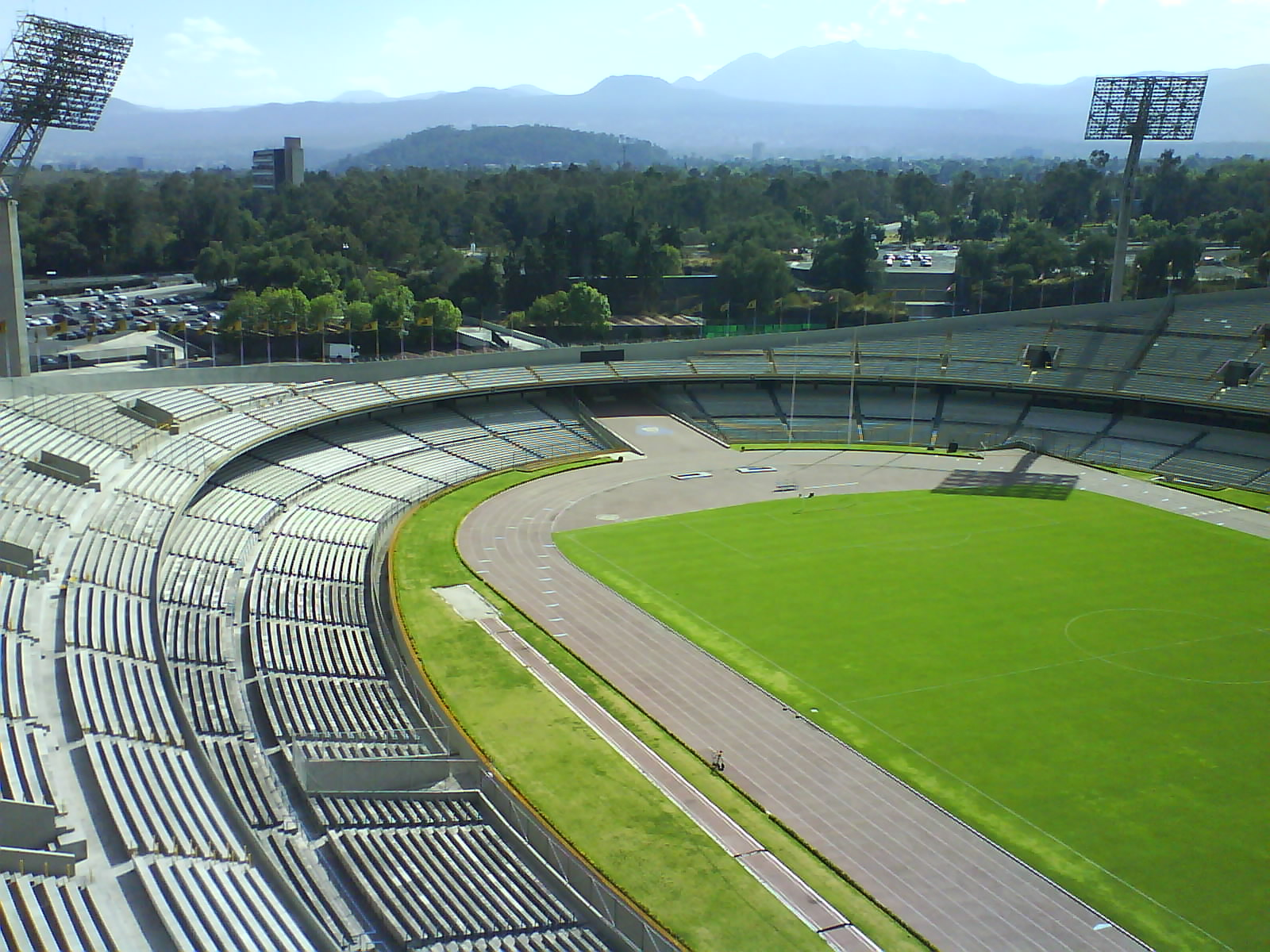
Estadio Atanasio Girardot (left) and Estadio Olímpico Universitario, venues for the series

== Match details ==
=== First leg ===
1989 Copa Interamericana
July 25, 1990
First leg

Atlético Nacional (Colombia)	2–0	(Mexico) UNAM
	Report

Atanasio Girardot, Medellín
Attendance: 26,300
Referee: Jorge Orellana (Ecuador)

Atlético Nacional	UNAM

GK	1	(Colombia) René Higuita
DF	4	(Colombia) Luis Herrera
DF	15	(Colombia) Luis Perea
DF		(Colombia) Geovanis Cassiani
DF		(Colombia) Gabriel J. Gómez
MF		(Colombia) Oscar Galeano
MF	8	(Colombia) Alexis García
MF	20	(Colombia) Felipe Pérez
MF	21	(Colombia) Luis Fajardo
FW		(Colombia) Carlos Valderrama	(substituted off) a'
FW		(Colombia) Rubén D. Hernández	(substituted off) b'
Substitutes:
MF	18	(Colombia) John J. Carmona	(substituted on) a'
FW		(Colombia) Faustino Asprilla	(substituted on) b'
Manager:
(Colombia) Hernán Darío Gómez

GK	(Mexico) Sergio Bernal
DF	(Mexico) Israel Castillo
DF	(Mexico) Juan Ramírez
DF	(Mexico) Claudio Suárez
DF	(Mexico) Eduardo Medina
MF	(Mexico) Miguel España
MF	(Mexico) Manuel Negrete
MF	(Mexico) Marcos Misdrahi
FW	(Mexico) Luis García Postigo
FW	(Mexico) David Patiño	(substituted off) a'
FW	(Mexico) Juan Carlos Vera
Substitutes:
FW	(Mexico) Jorge Campos	(substituted on) a'
Manager:
(Mexico) Miguel Mejía Barón

=== Second leg ===
August 1, 1990
Second leg

UNAM (Mexico)	1–4	(Colombia) Atlético Nacional
Nava 28' (o.g.); Restrepo 67'; Galeano 70'; Arango 87'	Report	Negrete 86' (pen.)

Olímpico Universitario, Mexico City
Attendance: 30,000
Referee: Juan Escobar (Guatemala)

UNAM	Atlético Nacional

GK	(Mexico) Sergio Bernal
DF	(Mexico) Israel Castillo	(substituted off) 56'
DF	(Mexico) Juan Ramírez
DF	(Mexico) Claudio Suárez
DF	(Mexico) Abraham Nava
MF	(Mexico) Miguel España
MF	(Mexico) Manuel Negrete
MF	(Mexico) Marcos Misdrahi	(substituted off) 36'
FW	(Mexico) Juan Carlos Vera
FW	(Mexico) Jorge Campos
FW	(Mexico) Luis García Postigo
Substitutes:
MF	(Mexico) Alberto García Aspe	(substituted on) 36'
FW	(Mexico) David Patiño	(substituted on) 56'
Manager:
(Mexico) Miguel Mejía Barón

GK	1	(Colombia) René Higuita
DF	4	(Colombia) Luis Herrera
DF	15	(Colombia) Luis Perea
DF		(Colombia) Geovanis Cassiani
DF		(Colombia) Gabriel J. Gómez
MF		(Colombia) Gildardo Pérez
MF	8	(Colombia) Alexis García
MF	20	(Colombia) Felipe Pérez
MF	21	(Colombia) Luis Fajardo	(substituted off) 60'
FW		(Colombia) Oscar Galeano
FW		(Colombia) Rubén D. Hernández	(substituted off) 64'
Substitutes:
MF		(Colombia) Gustavo Restrepo	(substituted on) 60'
FW		(Colombia) Jaime Arango	(substituted on) 64'
Manager:
(Colombia) Hernán Darío Gómez
