= Andrés Escobar =

Colombian footballer (1967–1994)

- Escobar with Colombia at the 1994 FIFA World Cup

Personal information
- Full name: Andrés Escobar Saldarriaga
- Date of birth: 13 March 1967
- Place of birth: Medellín, Colombia
- Date of death: 2 July 1994 (aged 27)
- Place of death: Medellín, Colombia
- Height: 1.85 m (6 ft 1 in)
- Position: Centre-back

Youth career
- 1985–1986: Atlético Nacional

Senior career*
Years	Team	Apps	(Gls)
1986–1989	Atlético Nacional	78	(0)
1990	Young Boys	8	(0)
1990–1994	Atlético Nacional	144	(0)
Total		230	(0)

International career
1988–1994	Colombia	51	(1)
- * Club domestic league appearances and goals

Andrés Escobar Saldarriaga (Spanish pronunciation: [anˈdɾes eskoˈβaɾ saldaˈrjaɣa]; 13 March 1967 – 2 July 1994) was a Colombian professional footballer who played as a centre-back. He played for Atlético Nacional, BSC Young Boys, and the Colombia national team. Nicknamed The Gentleman, he was known for his clean style of play and calmness on the pitch.

Escobar was murdered in the aftermath of the 1994 FIFA World Cup, reportedly as retaliation for having accidentally scored an own goal which contributed to Colombia's elimination from the tournament. His murder further tarnished the image of the country internationally. Escobar himself had worked to promote a more positive image of Colombia, earning acclaim in the country.

Escobar is still held in high regard by Colombian fans, and is especially mourned and remembered by Atlético Nacional's fans.

== Early life ==
Andrés Escobar Saldarriaga was born in Medellín on 13 March 1967. He grew up in a middle-class family. He attended Colegio Calasanz and graduated from Instituto Conrado González. He participated in school football teams before becoming a professional football player.

His father was Darío Escobar, a banker who founded an organization that gives young people the opportunity to play football instead of being on the streets. His brother, Santiago, is a former footballer who played alongside Andrés at Atlético Nacional before moving into team management in 1998.

== Club career ==
Escobar was a defender throughout his career. His jersey number was 2, and he was known by the nicknames "El Caballero del Fútbol" ("The Gentleman of Football") and "The Immortal Number 2". In his club career, he played for Colombian club Atlético Nacional and Swiss club Young Boys.

=== First spell at Atlético Nacional ===
He joined the youth team of Atlético Nacional in 1985 and would debut for the senior team in 1986. He finished as runner-up in the 1988 Primera A, and he helped Nacional to win the 1989 Copa Libertadores and the 1989 Copa Interamericana.

He scored his first goal for Nacional during the 2–1 victory against Deportivo Quito during the Copa Libertadores group stage on 13 March 1989.

=== Young Boys ===
Escobar joined 1. Liga club Young Boys on a six-month deal in January 1990 and he made his debut on 25 February 1990 during the 1–1 draw against St. Gallen. He left the club on 20 August 1990 after playing only eight matches.

=== Return to Atlético Nacional ===
He rejoined Atlético Nacional in late August 1990. He won his only Primera A title in 1991, finishing runner-up again in 1990 and 1992.

Prior to the 1994 World Cup, Escobar was reported to have been offered a contract by AC Milan.

== International career ==
He made his debut for the Colombia national team on 30 March 1988, in a 3–0 win against Canada. His first appearance in an international competition took place at the 1988 Rous Cup, where he also scored the only goal of his career in a 1–1 draw against England.

He played four matches at the 1989 Copa América when he was 22 years old. The team was eliminated in the first round of the tournament. The same year, he also played in 1990 FIFA World Cup qualifying matches. The team finished as winners of Group 2, though had to enter the inter-confederation play-offs, where they beat Israel 1–0 on aggregate and qualified for the 1990 FIFA World Cup, after an absence of 28 years of the tournament (since 1962). Escobar played in all of his country's matches during the World Cup as they reached the round of 16, being eliminated after a 2–1 loss to Cameroon.

Escobar was called up for the 1991 Copa América squad, where he made seven appearances. He did not participate in any games of the 1994 FIFA World Cup qualification, but he was called up for the World Cup.

== Murder and aftermath ==
=== Background ===
Escobar's own goal occurred in Colombia's second group match against host nation the United States during the 1994 FIFA World Cup. Stretching to block a cross from American midfielder John Harkes, he inadvertently deflected the ball into his own net. This gave the U.S. a 1–0 lead in an eventual 2–1 victory. This meant that in order to advance to the next round, Colombia needed to defeat Switzerland in their final group match and also needed the United States to defeat Romania in the concurrent match in order to have a chance at advancing. Colombia ended up defeating Switzerland 2–0 but Romania's 1–0 victory over the United States meant Colombia was eliminated from the tournament finishing at the bottom of group A.

=== Shooting ===
After the tournament, Escobar decided to return to Colombia instead of visiting relatives in Las Vegas, Nevada. On the evening of July 1, 1994, five days after the elimination of Colombia from the World Cup, Escobar called his friends, and they went to a bar in the El Poblado neighbourhood in Medellín. Then they went to a liquor store. Shortly afterwards, they arrived at the El Indio nightclub. His friends split up. At approximately 3:00 the next morning, Escobar was alone in the parking lot of El Indio, in his car, when three men appeared. They began arguing with him. Two of the men took out handguns. Escobar was shot six times with a .38 caliber Llama-brand revolver. It was reported that the killer shouted "¡Gol!" ("Goal!") after every shot. The group then drove away in a Toyota pick-up truck, leaving Escobar mortally wounded.

=== Declared death ===
Escobar was taken to the hospital where he died 45 minutes later; he was 27 years old.

The murder was widely believed to be a punishment for the own goal. In the UK, the BBC issued a public apology after its football pundit Alan Hansen commented during the World Cup's Round of 16 match between Argentina and Romania that "The Argentine defender warrants shooting for a mistake like that," on 3 July, a day after the murder of Escobar.

=== Funeral ===
Escobar's funeral was attended by more than 120,000 people. Every year, people honour Escobar by bringing photographs of him to matches. In July 2002, the city of Medellín unveiled a statue in honour of his memory.

=== Investigation ===
Humberto Castro Muñoz, a drug cartel bodyguard in Colombia, was arrested on the night of 2 July 1994, confessing the next day to the killing of Escobar. Castro also worked as a driver for Santiago Gallón, who had allegedly lost heavily having bet on Colombia. He was found guilty of Escobar's murder in June 1995. He was sentenced to 43 years in prison. The sentence was later reduced to 26 years because of his submitting to the ruling penal code in 2001. Castro was released on good behaviour due to further reductions from prison work and study in 2005. His three accomplices were acquitted.

In 2013, Francisco Maturana, a former coach of Escobar's, denied that his murder had any connection to football or the World Cup, but rather was due to being "in the wrong place at the wrong time" at a violent time in Colombia's history. Escobar's murder further tarnished the country's international image.

In 2026, Santiago Gallón was shot dead at a restaurant in Huixquilucan, Mexico.

== Legacy ==
Escobar worked to promote a positive image of Colombia and is prided by his country as a result. He received widespread admiration throughout the world for his exemplary character and conduct. Escobar embodied sportsmanship and integrity, which earned him the nickname "El Caballero del Fútbol."

Escobar is routinely honored, and is especially mourned by Colombian Atlético Nacional fans. In a newspaper column published shortly before his killing, he said of Colombia's World Cup, "It’s been a most amazing and rare experience. We’ll see each other again soon because life does not end here."

After Escobar's death, his family founded the Andrés Escobar Project to help disadvantaged children learn to play football. Prior to the 2001 Copa América hosted by Colombia, the city of Medellín unveiled a statue of Escobar. In 2001, Medellín unveiled another statue of Escobar. It was created by sculptor Alejandro Hernandez, commissioned by the Alcaldia de Medellín. The statue is located at a large, community sports complex named in Escobar's honor: Unidad Deportiva de Belén Andrés Escobar Saldarriaga.

== In popular culture ==
In 2010, a documentary film titled The Two Escobars was released as a part of ESPN's 30 for 30 documentary series. It was directed by Jeff and Michael Zimbalist, which looked back at Andrés Escobar's death, Colombia's 1994 World Cup run and the relationship between association football and the country's criminal gangs, notably the Medellín Cartel run by Pablo Escobar (unrelated to Andrés).

In 2022, Netflix released a mini-series titled Goles en contra based on his life.

== Personal life ==
Prior to his death, Escobar was engaged to his girlfriend for five years, a dentist named Pamela Cascardo. They would have been married later in 1994. Escobar was a devout Catholic and would go to Mass every day before school with his mother until her death at the age of 52.

== Career statistics ==
=== Club ===
This table is incomplete, thus some stats and totals could be incorrect.

Club performance			League		Cup		Continental		Other		Total	
Season	Club	League	Apps	Goals	Apps	Goals	Apps	Goals	Apps	Goals	Apps	Goals
Colombia/Switzerland			League		Cup		South America		Other		Total	
1986	Atlético Nacional	Campeonato Profesional	3	0	0	0	0	0	—		3	0
1987	Atlético Nacional	Campeonato Profesional	21	0	0	0	0	0	—		21	0
1988	Atlético Nacional	Campeonato Profesional	42	0	0	0	—		—		42	0
1989 (Note: This season was cancelled before ending, however, the appearances and goals are counted for statistical reasons.)	Atlético Nacional	Campeonato Profesional	12	0	0	0	14	1	1	0	26	1
1989–90	Young Boys	1. Liga	8	0	—		—		—		8	0
1990	Atlético Nacional	Categoría Primera A	26	0	0	0	0	0	—		26	0
1991	Atlético Nacional	Categoría Primera A	37	0	0	0	12	1	—		49	1
1992	Atlético Nacional	Categoría Primera A	49	0	0	0	10	2	—		59	1
1993	Atlético Nacional	Categoría Primera A	21	0	0	0	2	0	—		23	0
1994	Atlético Nacional	Categoría Primera A	11	0	0	0	—		—		11	0
Total	Colombia		222	0	0	0	38	3	1	0	251	3
Total	Switzerland		8	0	—		—		—		8	0
Total	Career total		230	0	0	0	38	3	1	0	259	3

=== International ===
==== International appearances ====
Team	Year	Apps	Goals
Colombia	1988	6	1
Colombia	1989	16	0
Colombia	1990	5	0
Colombia	1991	8	0
Colombia	1992	2	0
Colombia	1993	1	0
Colombia	1994	13	0
Total		51	1

==== International goals ====
International goals
No.	Date	Venue	Opponent	Score	Result	Competition
1	24 May 1988	Wembley Stadium, London, England	England	1–1	1–1	1988 Rous Cup

== Honours ==
Atlético Nacional

- Primera A: 1991; runner-up: 1988, 1990, 1992
- Copa Interamericana: 1989
- Copa Libertadores: 1989
- Intercontinental Cup runner-up: 1989
