= 1999–2000 Real Sociedad season =

Real Sociedad
1999–2000 season
- President: Luis Uranga Otaegui
- Head coach: Bernd Krauss (until 25 October); Javier Clemente (from 27 October)
- Stadium: Anoeta
- La Liga: 13th
- Copa del Rey: First round
- Top goalscorer: League: Óscar de Paula (9); All: Óscar de Paula (9)
- Average home league attendance: 21,666
- Biggest win: Real Sociedad 4–1 Atlético Madrid; Real Sociedad 3–0 Valladolid; Real Sociedad 4–1 Athletic Club
- Biggest defeat: Valencia 4–0 Real Sociedad

The 1999–2000 season was Real Sociedad's 91st season in existence and the club's 33rd consecutive season in the top flight of Spanish football. In addition to the domestic league, Real Sociedad participated in this season's edition of the Copa del Rey. The season covers the period from 1 July 1999 to 30 June 2000.

Head coach Bernd Krauss was dismissed after nine matches due to poor results and replaced by Javier Clemente two days later.

== Pre-season and friendlies ==
Win Draw Loss

10 August 1999 Friendly	Real Sociedad (Spain)	2–2	(Uruguay) Nacional	San Sebastián
CEST (UTC+2)	Aldeondo 42', 65'		Fuentes 12'; Delgado 55'	Stadium: Anoeta; Referee: Eduardo Iturralde González

== Competitions ==
=== Overview ===
Competition	First match	Last match	Starting round	Final position	Record							
Competition	First match	Last match	Starting round	Final position	Pld	W	D	L	GF	GA	GD	Win %
La Liga	22 August 1999	20 May 2000	Matchday 1	13th	38	11	14	13	42	49	−7	28.95
Copa del Rey	10 November 1999	1 December 2000	First round	First round	2	0	0	2	1	3	−2	0.00
Total					40	11	14	15	43	52	−9	27.50

Source: Competitions

=== La Liga ===
==== League table ====
Pos	Team	Pld	W	D	L	GF	GA	GD	Pts	Qualification or relegation
11	Athletic Bilbao	38	12	14	12	47	57	−10	50	
12	Málaga	38	11	15	12	55	50	+5	48	
13	Real Sociedad	38	11	14	13	42	49	−7	47 (Note: ESP 0–0 RSO; RSO 1–0 ESP)	
14	Espanyol	38	12	11	15	51	48	+3	47	Qualification for the UEFA Cup first round (Note: Espanyol entered UEFA Cup as winners of 1999–2000 Copa del Rey.)
15	Racing Santander	38	10	16	12	52	50	+2	46	

Source: LFP
Rules for classification: 1) points; 2) head-to-head points; 3) head-to-head goal difference; 4) head-to-head goals scored; 5) goal difference; 6) number of goals scored.

==== Results summary ====
Overall								Home						Away					
Pld	W	D	L	GF	GA	GD	Pts	W	D	L	GF	GA	GD	W	D	L	GF	GA	GD
0	0	0	0	0	0	0	0	0	0	0	0	0	0	0	0	0	0	0	0

==== Results by round ====
Round	1	2	3	4	5	6	7	8	9	10	11	12	13	14	15	16	17	18	19	20	21	22	23	24	25	26	27	28	29	30	31	32	33	34	35	36	37	38
Ground	A	H	A	H	H	A	H	A	H	A	H	A	H	A	H	A	H	A	H	H	A	H	A	A	H	A	H	A	H	A	H	A	H	A	H	A	H	A
Result	D	W	L	W	L	L	L	D	D	L	W	D	W	D	L	D	D	L	D	D	D	W	L	L	W	D	W	L	W	L	D	W	W	L	D	L	D	W
Position																																						

A = Away; H = Home; W = Win; D = Draw; L = Loss

==== Matches ====
22 August 1999 1	Sevilla	2–2	Real Sociedad	Seville
CEST (UTC+2)				Stadium: Sánchez Pizjuán

28 August 1999 2	Real Sociedad	4–1	Atlético Madrid	San Sebastián
CEST (UTC+2)				Stadium: Anoeta

12 September 1999 3	Rayo Vallecano	2–1	Real Sociedad	Madrid
CEST (UTC+2)				Stadium: Vallecas

19 September 1999 4	Real Sociedad	2–1	Mallorca	San Sebastián
CEST (UTC+2)				Stadium: Anoeta

25 September 1999 5	Real Sociedad	0–2	Celta	San Sebastián
CEST (UTC+2)				Stadium: Anoeta

3 October 1999 6	Zaragoza	2–0	Real Sociedad	Zaragoza
CEST (UTC+2)				Stadium: La Romareda

13 October 1999 7	Real Sociedad	2–5	Racing de Santander	San Sebastián
CEST (UTC+2)				Stadium: Anoeta

17 October 1999 8	Espanyol	0–0	Real Sociedad	Barcelona
CEST (UTC+2)				Stadium: Olímpic Lluís Companys

24 October 1999 9	Real Sociedad	1–1	Alavés	San Sebastián
CEST (UTC+2)				Stadium: Anoeta

31 October 1999 10	Real Betis	1–0	Real Sociedad	Seville
CET (UTC+1)				Stadium: Estadio Benito Villamarín

7 November 1999 11	Real Sociedad	3–0	Valladolid	San Sebastián
CET (UTC+1)				Stadium: Anoeta

21 November 1999 12	Real Madrid	1–1	Real Sociedad	Madrid
CET (UTC+1)				Stadium: Santiago Bernabéu

28 November 1999 13	Real Sociedad	2–1	CD Numancia	San Sebastián
CET (UTC+1)				Stadium: Anoeta

4 December 1999 14	Athletic Club	1–1	Real Sociedad	Bilbao
CET (UTC+1)				Stadium: San Mamés

12 December 1999 15	Real Sociedad	0–1	Deportivo La Coruña	San Sebastián
CET (UTC+1)				Stadium: Anoeta

19 December 1999 16	Málaga	0–0	Real Sociedad	Málaga
CET (UTC+1)				Stadium: La Rosaleda

22 December 1999 17	Real Sociedad	0–0	Valencia CF	San Sebastián
CET (UTC+1)				Stadium: Anoeta

5 January 2000 18	Barcelona	3–1	Real Sociedad	Barcelona
CET (UTC+1)				Stadium: Camp Nou

9 January 2000 19	Real Sociedad	0–0	Oviedo	San Sebastián
CET (UTC+1)				Stadium: Anoeta

16 January 2000 20	Real Sociedad	1–1	Sevilla	San Sebastián
CET (UTC+1)				Stadium: Anoeta

23 January 2000 21	Atlético Madrid	1–1	Real Sociedad	Madrid
CET (UTC+1)				Stadium: Vicente Calderón Stadium

30 January 2000 22	Real Sociedad	2–1	Rayo Vallecano	San Sebastián
CET (UTC+1)				Stadium: Anoeta

6 February 2000 23	Mallorca	2–1	Real Sociedad	Palma
CET (UTC+1)				Stadium: Son Moix

13 February 2000 24	Celta Vigo	4–1	Real Sociedad	Vigo
CET (UTC+1)				Stadium: Balaídos

20 February 2000 25	Real Sociedad	2–1	Zaragoza	San Sebastián
CET (UTC+1)				Stadium: Anoeta

27 February 2000 26	Racing Santander	0–0	Real Sociedad	Santander
CET (UTC+1)				Stadium: El Sardinero

5 March 2000 27	Real Sociedad	1–0	Espanyol	San Sebastián
CET (UTC+1)				Stadium: Anoeta

12 March 2000 28	Alavés	2–1	Real Sociedad	Vitoria-Gasteiz
CET (UTC+1)				Stadium: Mendizorroza

19 March 2000 29	Real Sociedad	1–0	Real Betis	San Sebastián
CET (UTC+1)				Stadium: Anoeta

25 March 2000 30	Valladolid	2–1	Real Sociedad	Valladolid
CET (UTC+1)				Stadium: Estadio José Zorrilla

1 April 2000 31	Real Sociedad	1–1	Real Madrid	San Sebastián
CEST (UTC+2)				Stadium: Anoeta

9 April 2000 32	Numancia	1–2	Real Sociedad	Soria
CEST (UTC+2)				Stadium: Los Pajaritos

16 April 2000 33	Real Sociedad	4–1	Athletic Club	San Sebastián
CEST (UTC+2)				Stadium: Anoeta

23 April 2000 34	Deportivo La Coruña	2–0	Real Sociedad	A Coruña
CEST (UTC+2)				Stadium: Riazor Stadium

30 April 2000 35	Real Sociedad	2–2	Málaga	San Sebastián
CEST (UTC+2)	Khokhlov 19'; Pikabea 66'		Catanha 51'; Musampa 79'	Stadium: Anoeta; Referee: Manuel Díaz Vega

6 May 2000 36	Valencia	4–0	Real Sociedad	Valencia
CEST (UTC+2)	Angulo 17'; Carboni 50'; Barkero 78'; Mendieta 88'			Stadium: Mestalla; Referee: Javier Turienzo Álvarez

14 May 2000 37	Real Sociedad	0–0	Barcelona	San Sebastián
CEST (UTC+2)				Stadium: Anoeta; Referee: Julián Rodríguez Santiago

20 May 2000 38	Oviedo	0–1	Real Sociedad	Oviedo
CEST (UTC+2)			Barkero 70'	Stadium: Carlos Tartiere; Referee: Juan Ansuategui Roca

=== Copa del Rey ===
==== First round ====
10 November 1999 First leg	Logroñés	2–1	Real Sociedad	Logroño
CET (UTC+1)	Quico 73'; Manel 89'		Iñigo Idiakez 30'	Stadium: Las Gaunas; Referee: Alfonso Pérez Burrull

1 December 2000 Second leg	Real Sociedad	0–1 (1–3 agg.)	Logroñés	San Sebastián
CET (UTC+1)			Arenaza 90'	Stadium: Anoeta; Referee: Antonio López Nieto

== Statistics ==
=== Goalscorers ===
Rank	Pos	No.	Nat.	Player	La Liga	Copa del Rey	Total
1	FW	21	(Spain)	Óscar de Paula	9	0	9
2	FW	18	(Spain)	Iñigo Idiakez	5	1	6
3	FW	34	(Lithuania)	Edgaras Jankauskas	4	0	4
4	MF	10	(Spain)	Javier de Pedro	3	0	3
4	MF	11	(Spain)	Mikel Aranburu	3	0	3
4	MF	19	(Russia)	Dmitri Khokhlov	3	0	3
4	FW	9	(Colombia)	Víctor Bonilla	3	0	3
Totals					42	1	43
