= Gustavo Restrepo =

Gustavo Restrepo may refer to:

- Gustavo Restrepo (footballer) (born 1969), Colombian footballer
- Gustavo Restrepo (race walker) (born 1982), Colombian race walker
