= Torneo Clausura 2008 (Paraguay) =

Primera División
- Season: 2008 Clausura

The Torneo Clausura 2008 (official name: Copa Tigo 2008) is the football (soccer) tournament that closes the season in the Paraguayan first division.

The tournament began on July 25 with the participation of 12 teams, playing a two-legged all play all system. In the end, Libertad won the tournament, securing a spot for the Copa Libertadores 2009.

== Standings ==
| Pos | Team | Pld | W | D | L | GF | GA | GD | Pts |
|---|---|---|---|---|---|---|---|---|---|
| 1 | Libertad | 22 | 12 | 8 | 2 | 35 | 17 | +18 | 44 |
| 2 | Guaraní | 22 | 12 | 7 | 3 | 36 | 17 | +19 | 43 |
| 3 | Cerro Porteño | 22 | 10 | 7 | 5 | 32 | 26 | +6 | 37 |
| 4 | Sol de América | 22 | 12 | 3 | 7 | 37 | 30 | +7 | 36 |
| 5 | Nacional | 22 | 8 | 8 | 6 | 23 | 22 | +1 | 32 |
| 6 | Tacuary | 22 | 9 | 4 | 9 | 23 | 24 | −1 | 31 |
| 7 | Olimpia | 22 | 7 | 7 | 8 | 33 | 31 | +2 | 28 |
| 8 | 12 de Octubre | 22 | 8 | 4 | 10 | 27 | 33 | −6 | 28 |
| 9 | 3 de Febrero | 22 | 6 | 6 | 10 | 27 | 31 | −4 | 24 |
| 10 | Sportivo Luqueño | 22 | 6 | 6 | 10 | 27 | 38 | −11 | 24 |
| 11 | 2 de Mayo | 22 | 4 | 10 | 8 | 26 | 33 | −7 | 22 |
| 12 | Silvio Pettirossi | 22 | 1 | 6 | 15 | 15 | 39 | −24 | 9 |

== Results ==
Matchday 1
| Home team | Result | Away team |
|---|---|---|
| 12 de Octubre | 3 - 1 | 2 de Mayo |
| Olimpia | 0 - 0 | Nacional |
| Tacuary | 0 - 1 | Sol de América |
| Libertad | 1 - 0 | Silvio Pettirossi |
| Sportivo Luqueño | 3 - 2 | 3 de Febrero |
| Cerro Porteño | 1 - 5 | Guaraní |

Matchday 2
| Home team | Result | Away team |
|---|---|---|
| Cerro Porteño | 0 - 0 | 12 de Octubre |
| Guaraní | 1 - 0 | Sportivo Luqueño |
| 3 de Febrero | 1 - 2 | Libertad |
| Silvio Pettirossi | 1 - 2 | Tacuary |
| Sol de América | 4 - 3 | Olimpia |
| Nacional | 2 - 0 | 2 de Mayo |

Matchday 3
| Home team | Result | Away team |
|---|---|---|
| 12 de Octubre | 2 - 1 | Nacional |
| 2 de Mayo | 2 - 3 | Sol de América |
| Olimpia | 4 - 0 | Silvio Pettirossi |
| Tacuary | 2 - 1 | 3 de Febrero |
| Libertad | 1 - 1 | Guaraní |
| Sportivo Luqueño | 0 - 0 | Cerro Porteño |

Matchday 4
| Home team | Result | Away team |
|---|---|---|
| Sportivo Luqueño | 2 - 2 | 12 de Octubre |
| Cerro Porteño | 0 - 0 | Libertad |
| Guaraní | 3 - 1 | Tacuary |
| 3 de Febrero | 2 - 0 | Olimpia |
| Silvio Pettirossi | 1 - 1 | 2 de Mayo |
| Sol de América | 2 - 0 | Nacional |

Matchday 5
| Home team | Result | Away team |
|---|---|---|
| 12 de Octubre | 2 - 0 | Sol de América |
| Nacional | 0 - 0 | Silvio Pettirossi |
| 2 de Mayo | 1 - 1 | 3 de Febrero |
| Olimpia | 0 - 2 | Guaraní |
| Tacuary | 1 - 2 | Cerro Porteño |
| Libertad | 4 - 2 | Sportivo Luqueño |

Matchday 6
| Home team | Result | Away team |
|---|---|---|
| Libertad | 1 - 0 | 12 de Octubre |
| Sportivo Luqueño | 2 - 3 | Tacuary |
| Cerro Porteño | 1 - 0 | Olimpia |
| Guaraní | 0 - 0 | 2 de Mayo |
| 3 de Febrero | 1 - 1 | Nacional |
| Silvio Pettirossi | 1 - 4 | Sol de América |

Matchday 7
| Home team | Result | Away team |
|---|---|---|
| 12 de Octubre | 2 - 0 | Silvio Pettirossi |
| Sol de América | 1 - 2 | 3 de Febrero |
| Nacional | 0 - 0 | Guaraní |
| 2 de Mayo | 2 - 2 | Cerro Porteño |
| Olimpia | 2 - 1 | Sportivo Luqueño |
| Tacuary | 1 - 0 | Libertad |

Matchday 8
| Home team | Result | Away team |
|---|---|---|
| Tacuary | 0 - 1 | 12 de Octubre |
| Libertad | 1 - 1 | Olimpia |
| Sportivo Luqueño | 1 - 1 | 2 de Mayo |
| Cerro Porteño | 2 - 3 | Nacional |
| Guaraní | 0 - 0 | Sol de América |
| 3 de Febrero | 2 - 0 | Silvio Pettirossi |

Matchday 9
| Home team | Result | Away team |
|---|---|---|
| 12 de Octubre | 2 - 1 | 3 de Febrero |
| Silvio Pettirossi | 0 - 1 | Guaraní |
| Sol de América | 1 - 2 | Cerro Porteño |
| Nacional | 0 - 0 | Sportivo Luqueño |
| 2 de Mayo | 1 - 1 | Libertad |
| Olimpia | 1 - 3 | Tacuary |

Matchday 10
| Home team | Result | Away team |
|---|---|---|
| Olimpia | 3 - 1 | 12 de Octubre |
| Tacuary | 1 - 2 | 2 de Mayo |
| Libertad | 3 - 0 | Nacional |
| Sportivo Luqueño | 0 - 3 | Sol de América |
| Cerro Porteño | 1 - 1 | Silvio Pettirossi |
| Guaraní | 2 - 1 | 3 de Febrero |

Matchday 11
| Home team | Result | Away team |
|---|---|---|
| 12 de Octubre | 4 - 1 | Guaraní |
| 3 de Febrero | 1 - 1 | Cerro Porteño |
| Silvio Pettirossi | 0 - 0 | Sportivo Luqueño |
| Sol de América | 0 - 1 | Libertad |
| Nacional | 1 - 0 | Tacuary |
| 2 de Mayo | 1 - 1 | Olimpia |

Matchday 12
| Home team | Result | Away team |
|---|---|---|
| 2 de Mayo | 3 - 0 | 12 de Octubre |
| Nacional | 1 - 1 | Olimpia |
| Sol de América | 2 - 0 | Tacuary |
| Silvio Pettirossi | 0 - 1 | Libertad |
| 3 de Febrero | 1 - 2 | Sportivo Luqueño |
| Guaraní | 3 - 0 | Cerro Porteño |

Matchday 13
| Home team | Result | Away team |
|---|---|---|
| 12 de Octubre | 1 - 3 | Cerro Porteño |
| Sportivo Luqueño | 1 - 0 | Guaraní |
| Libertad | 0 - 0 | 3 de Febrero |
| Tacuary | 1 - 0 | Silvio Pettirossi |
| Olimpia | 1 - 1 | Sol de América |
| 2 de Mayo | 0 - 2 | Nacional |

Matchday 14
| Home team | Result | Away team |
|---|---|---|
| Nacional | 1 - 0 | 12 de Octubre |
| Sol de América | 2 - 2 | 2 de Mayo |
| Silvio Pettirossi | 2 - 3 | Olimpia |
| 3 de Febrero | 3 - 2 | Tacuary |
| Guaraní | 1 - 2 | Libertad |
| Cerro Porteño | 2 - 2 | Sportivo Luqueño |

Matchday 15
| Home team | Result | Away team |
|---|---|---|
| 12 de Octubre | 3 - 2 | Sportivo Luqueño |
| Libertad | 1 - 3 | Cerro Porteño |
| Tacuary | 1 - 1 | Guaraní |
| Olimpia | 2 - 0 | 3 de Febrero |
| 2 de Mayo | 2 - 2 | Silvio Pettirossi |
| Nacional | 2 - 3 | Sol de América |

Matchday 16
| Home team | Result | Away team |
|---|---|---|
| Sol de América | 3 - 0 | 12 de Octubre |
| Silvio Pettirossi | 1 - 3 | Nacional |
| 3 de Febrero | 0 - 1 | 2 de Mayo |
| Guaraní | 1 - 1 | Olimpia |
| Cerro Porteño | 0 - 1 | Tacuary |
| Sportivo Luqueño | 0 - 3 | Libertad |

Matchday 17
| Home team | Result | Away team |
|---|---|---|
| 12 de Octubre | 2 - 2 | Libertad |
| Tacuary | 0 - 1 | Sportivo Luqueño |
| Olimpia | 1 - 3 | Cerro Porteño |
| 2 de Mayo | 1 - 1 | Guaraní |
| Nacional | 2 - 1 | 3 de Febrero |
| Sol de América | 3 - 1 | Silvio Pettirossi |

Matchday 18
| Home team | Result | Away team |
|---|---|---|
| Silvio Pettirossi | 1 - 1 | 12 de Octubre |
| 3 de Febrero | 2 - 0 | Sol de América |
| Guaraní | 1 - 0 | Nacional |
| Cerro Porteño | 1 - 0 | 2 de Mayo |
| Sportivo Luqueño | 1 - 2 | Olimpia |
| Libertad | 1 - 1 | Tacuary |

Matchday 19
| Home team | Result | Away team |
|---|---|---|
| 12 de Octubre | 0 - 1 | Tacuary |
| Olimpia | 1 - 3 | Libertad |
| 2 de Mayo | 2 - 3 | Sportivo Luqueño |
| Nacional | 1 - 0 | Cerro Porteño |
| Sol de américa | 1 - 3 | Guaraní |
| Silvio Pettirossi | 0 - 0 | 3 de Febrero |

Matchday 20
| Home team | Result | Away team |
|---|---|---|
| 3 de Febrero | 1 - 1 | 12 de Octubre |
| Guaraní | 3 - 1 | Silvio Pettirossi |
| Cerro Porteño | 2 - 0 | Sol de América |
| Sportivo Luqueño | 4 - 0 | Nacional |
| Libertad | 3 - 0 | 2 de Mayo |
| Tacuary | 1 - 1 | Olimpia |

Matchday 21
| Home team | Result | Away team |
|---|---|---|
| 12 de Octubre | 0 - 3 | Olimpia |
| 2 de Mayo | 0 - 1 | Tacuary |
| Nacional | 1 - 1 | Libertad |
| Sol de América | 2 - 0 | Sportivo Luqueño |
| Silvio Pettirossi | 0 - 4 | Cerro Porteño |
| 3 de Febrero | 1 - 4 | Guaraní |

Matchday 22
| Home team | Result | Away team |
|---|---|---|
| Guaraní | 2 - 0 | 12 de Octubre |
| Cerro Porteño | 2 - 2 | 3 de Febrero |
| Sportivo Luqueño | 0 - 3 | Silvio Pettirossi |
| Libertad | 4 - 1 | Sol de América |
| Tacuary | 0 - 0 | Nacional |
| Olimpia | 2 - 3 | 2 de Mayo |

== Top scorers ==
| Player | | Team | Goals |
|---|---|---|---|
| (Paraguay) | Edgar Benítez | Sol de América | 14 |
| (Argentina) | Jonathan Fabbro | Guaraní | 12 |
| (Paraguay) | Marco Lazaga | Olimpia | 9 |
| (Paraguay) | Manuel Maciel | Libertad | 8 |
| (Paraguay) | Erwin Avalos | Cerro Porteño | 8 |
| (Paraguay) | Daniel Ferreira | Tacuary | 7 |
| (Paraguay) | Hugo Notario | 12 de Octubre | 7 |
| (Paraguay) | Juan Samudio | Libertad | 7 |
| (Paraguay) | José Ortigoza | Sol de América | 7 |
| (Paraguay) | Walter Avalos | Luqueño | 7 |
| (Colombia) | Vladimir Marín | Libertad | 7 |

- Last Updated: December 24, 2008
