= Scorpion kick (association football) =

Physical move in association football

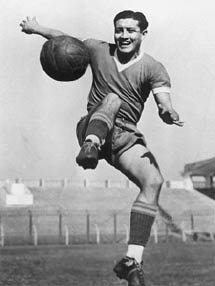
The Paraguayan Arsenio Erico is considered the creator of this acrobatic move, having performed it in 1934; it was initially dubbed the "balancín" (seesaw).

The scorpion kick, also known as a reverse bicycle kick or back hammer kick, is a physical move in association football that is achieved by diving or throwing the body forwards and then placing the hands on the ground to lunge the back heels forward to kick an incoming ball. Sports historian Andreas Campomar praises the manoeuvre as remarkable, noting that it "demonstrated that the spectacle had not died: that the game, in spite of its many flaws, could provide moments of glory that had little to do with just victory or defeat."

Although René Higuita is often credited with popularising the move, the scorpion kick was first performed by Paraguayan forward Arsenio Erico on 12 August 1934, when he scored a goal for Independiente de Avellaneda in a match against Boca Juniors, in front of 50,000 spectators. Following a cross from Antonio Sastre, Erico attempted a header by diving forward, but as he failed to connect with the ball properly, he resolved the play with an aerial backheel, scoring a goal that surprised the crowd. Initially referred to as the "balancín" (translated as 'seesaw' in English), the move was later associated with Higuita after his iconic performance in a 1995 international friendly match between Colombia and England at Wembley Stadium.

The move gets its name from the player's resemblance to a scorpion's tail while performing the kick.

On top of the regular diving scorpion kick, there are also other variations such as standing scorpion kick and spinning scorpion kick, neither of which necessarily result in the hands being placed on the ground. Swedish forward Zlatan Ibrahimović is a notable exponent for the standing scorpion kick, while the Italian defender Giuseppe Biava is a notable exponent of the spinning scorpion kick.
