= Fidel Miño =

Paraguayan footballer (born 1957)

Personal information
- Full name: Fidel Ramón Miño Medina
- Date of birth: 24 April 1957 (age 69)
- Place of birth: Itauguá, Paraguay
- Height: 1.83 m (6 ft 0 in)
- Position: Midfielder

Senior career*
Years	Team	Apps	(Gls)
1975-1982	Sol de América		
1983	Nacional		
1983–1990	Club Olimpia	201	(55)
1991	Luqueño		

International career
1979	Paraguay U20		
1980–1983	Paraguay	11	(1)
- * Club domestic league appearances and goals

Fidel Ramón Miño Medina (born 24 April 1957, in Itauguá, Paraguay) is a former football midfielder. He was part of Paraguay's squad for the 1983 Copa América tournament.

== Honours ==
=== Club ===
- Olimpia
  - Paraguayan Primera División: 1983, 1985, 1988, 1989
  - Copa Libertadores: 1990
  - Supercopa Sudamericana: 1990
  - Recopa Sudamericana: 1990
