= Eduardo Lell =

Argentine footballer

Personal information
- Full name: Eduardo Javier Lell
- Date of birth: 9 February 1964 (age 62)
- Place of birth: Paraná, Entre Ríos Province, Argentina
- Position: Defender

Senior career*
| Years | Team | Apps | (Gls) |
| 1988–1989 | Cobras | | |
| 1991–1992 | Cobras | 29 | (1) |
| 1995–1996 | Patronato | | |
| 1996–1998 | Deportivo Quito | | |
| 1999 | Deportivo Macará | | |
| 2001–2002 | Patronato | | |
- * Club domestic league appearances and goals

Eduardo Javier Lell (born 9 February 1964) is a retired Argentine football defender who played for several clubs in Latin America, including Cobras de Ciudad Juárez and Sociedad Deportivo Quito.

Lell played for Quito in the Copa Libertadores 1998 competition.
