= Albeiro Usuriaga =

Colombian footballer (1966–2004)

- Usuriaga during his years in General Paz Juniors, c. 1999

Personal information
- Full name: Albeiro Usurriaga López
- Date of birth: 12 June 1966
- Place of birth: Cali, Colombia
- Date of death: 11 February 2004 (aged 37)
- Place of death: Cali, Colombia
- Height: 1.92 m (6 ft 4 in)
- Position: Striker

Senior career*
Years	Team	Apps	(Gls)
1986	América Cali	7	(2)
1987	Deportes Tolima	13	(1)
1988	Cúcuta Deportivo	25	(4)
1989	Atlético Nacional	17	(2)
1990	Málaga	15	(4)
1991–1993	América Cali	37	(21)
1993	Málaga B	6	(1)
1994–1995	Independiente	26	(9)
1995	Necaxa	6	(0)
1996	Barcelona SC		
1996	Santos	1	(0)
1996–1997	Independiente	15	(4)
1998	Millonarios	5	(0)
1999	Bucaramanga	3	(1)
1999–2000	General Paz		
2000–2001	All Boys	4	(0)
2001	Deportivo Pasto	0	(0)
2002	Sportivo Luqueño		
2003	Carabobo	4	(0)
Total		184	(49)

International career
1989–1991	Colombia	15	(1)
- * Club domestic league appearances and goals

Albeiro Usuriaga López (12 June 1966 – 11 February 2004) was a Colombian professional footballer who played as a striker.

Nicknamed El Palomo, he played professionally in Colombia, Spain, Argentina, Mexico, Ecuador, Brazil, Paraguay and Venezuela, before being murdered at the age of 37.

== Club career ==
Usuriaga first came to prominence with Medellín's Atlético Nacional, scoring four goals in a 6–0 win against Danubio F.C. for the 1989 edition of the Libertadores Cup and adding another against Club Olimpia in the final (2–0 in the second leg in Paraguay), in an eventual penalty shootout win. goalkeeper René Higuita was amongst his teammates.

After playing two season halves in Spain with CD Málaga – Málaga CF's predecessor – and having a three-year spell with América de Cali, Usuriaga rarely settled with a team and continuously changed countries, appearing for Club Atlético Independiente (two stints), Club Necaxa, Barcelona Sporting Club, Santos FC, Club Deportivo Los Millonarios, Atlético Bucaramanga, General Paz Juniors, All Boys, Deportivo Pasto, Club Sportivo Luqueño and Carabobo FC.

In the 1993–94 season, Usuriaga contributed with four goals as Argentina's Independiente won the Clausura tournament. Three years later, whilst with the same team, he was handed a two-year ban by the Argentine Football Association after testing positive for cocaine. After playing in various levels of football, he retired from the game in 2003, at the age of 37.

== International career ==
Usuriaga gained 15 caps for Colombia, during three years. His only international goal came during the 1990 FIFA World Cup qualification playoffs against Israel, the only goal in the two legs.

Usuriaga was later, however, omitted from the final squad in Italy due to disciplinary problems.

== Murder ==
On 11 February 2004, Albeiro Usuriaga was shot dead while playing a card game in a nightclub district in his hometown of Cali, in unclear circumstances. He was 37 years old. It later surfaced he was murdered by hired killers, ordered by criminal Jefferson Valdez Marín who was dating his former girlfriend.

== See also ==
- List of sportspeople sanctioned for doping offences
