= Herib Chamas =

Paraguayan footballer and coach (born 1965)

Herib Yamil Chamas (born 2 August 1965 in Itacurubí del Rosario, Paraguay) is a former football defender and coach that also competes in Rally racing.

During his career as a footballer, Chamas played for Paraguayan teams like Sport Colombia and Olimpia where he won several national and international titles such as the Copa Libertadores and the Supercopa Sudamericana in 1990.

After retiring from football as a player, Chamas pursued Rally racing and even won some competitions such as the Santaní Rally in the A-5 class. Chamas also got a coaching license and worked in the youth divisions of Olimpia and as the assistant coach for Julio Carlos Gómez in Universitario de Deportes in 2007 and Sportivo Luqueño in 2008.
