= Sérgio João =

Brazilian footballer

Personal information
- Full name: Sérgio Ricardo João
- Date of birth: 26 December 1968 (age 57)
- Height: 1.70 m (5 ft 7 in)
- Position: Forward

Senior career*
Years	Team	Apps	(Gls)
1995–1996	Stormers de Sucre		
1997–1998	Bolívar		
1998	América de Cali		
1999	Jorge Wilstermann		
1999–2000	Vitória Setúbal		
2000	Blooming		
2001	Independiente Petrolero		
2001	Aurora		
- * Club domestic league appearances and goals

Sérgio Ricardo João, also known as Sérgio João (born 26 December 1968) is a retired Brazilian football striker. He became top goalscorer of Bolivia's highest league in 1996 and Copa Libertadores in 1998.
