= Rafael Bobadilla =

Paraguayan footballer (born 1963)

Personal information
- Full name: Rafael Bobadilla Orrego
- Date of birth: 24 October 1963 (age 63)
- Place of birth: Asunción, Paraguay
- Height: 1.76 m (5 ft 9 in)
- Position: Midfielder

Senior career*
Years	Team	Apps	(Gls)
1979–1986	Club Olimpia		
1987	Millonarios		
1987–1988	Unión de Santa Fe		
1988–1989	Club Olimpia		
1989	San Lorenzo		
1990	Cerro Porteño		
1992	Club Guaraní		
1993–1994	Leones Negros		
1997	Club Olimpia		
1998	The Strongest		
1999	Resistencia		

International career
1985–1987	Paraguay	4	(0)
- * Club domestic league appearances and goals

Rafael Bobadilla (born 24 October 1963) is a retired Paraguayan football midfielder.
