= Felipe Pérez =

Colombian footballer (1967–1996)

Personal information
- Full name: Felipe Pérez Urrea
- Date of birth: 1 January 1967
- Place of birth: Medellín, Colombia
- Date of death: 17 October 1996 (aged 29)
- Place of death: Medellín, Colombia
- Height: 1.85 m (6 ft 1 in)
- Position: Forward

Senior career*
Years	Team	Apps	(Gls)
1985–1992	Atlético Nacional	?	(?)
1993	Envigado	2	(0)

International career
1985	Colombia U20		
- * Club domestic league appearances and goals

Felipe Pérez Urrea (1 January 1967 – 17 October 1996), most known as Pipe Pérez, was a Colombian professional footballer who played as a forward.

== Career ==
Pérez Urrea integrated the Antioquia soccer teams in the youth and pre-youth categories from 1983, and in 1985 he was called up by coach Luis Alfonso Marroquín to join the Colombia U-20 national team, with which he participated in several tournaments, including a South American championship and a World Cup in the category.

That same year, he joined Atlético Nacional de Medellín, a team with which he competed in and won the 1989 Copa Libertadores.

== Imprisonment and death ==
Police arrested Pérez on 23 July 1993, after investigations linked him to the Medellín Cartel. He served nearly three years in La Modelo prison in Bogotá for illegal possession of firearms.

On 17 October 1996, he was found seriously wounded by multiple gunshot wounds near the Fátima neighborhood in the city of Medellín, he died later that same day.

== Honours ==
Atlético Nacional

- Campeonato Colombiano: 1991
- Copa Libertadores: 1989
