= 1989 Copa Libertadores =

30th season of Copa Libertadores

1989 Copa Libertadores de América
Tournament details
- Dates: February 12 – May 31
- Teams: 21 (from 10 associations)

Final positions
- Champions: (Colombia) Atlético Nacional (1st title)
- Runners-up: (Paraguay) Olimpia

Tournament statistics
- Matches played: 90
- Goals scored: 227 (2.52 per match)
- Top scorer(s): (Paraguay) Raúl Vicente Amarilla (10 Goals) (Uruguay) Carlos Aguilera (10 Goals)

The Copa Libertadores 1989 was the 30th edition of the Copa Libertadores, South America's premier international club association football tournament organized by CONMEBOL. 21 teams participated in the competition, divided by groups of four (two per country). The first three teams in each group qualified for the next round. Nacional of Montevideo entered directly into the second round as the champions of Copa Libertadores 1988. The tournament started with the first game on February 12, 1989, and ended on May 31, 1989.

== Qualified teams ==
Country	Team	Qualification method
CONMEBOL (1 berth)	Nacional	1988 Copa Libertadores champion
Argentina (2 berths)	Racing	1987–88 Primera División champion
Argentina (2 berths)	Boca Juniors	1987–88 Liguilla Pre-Libertadores winner
Bolivia (2 berths)	Bolívar	1988 Primera División champion
Bolivia (2 berths)	The Strongest	1988 Primera División runner-up
Brazil (2 berths)	Bahia	1988 Campeonato Brasileiro Série A champion
Brazil (2 berths)	Internacional	1988 Campeonato Brasileiro Série A runner-up
Chile (2 berths)	Cobreloa	1988 Primera División champion
Chile (2 berths)	Colo-Colo	1988 Liguilla Pre-Libertadores winner
Colombia (2 berths)	Millonarios	1988 Campeonato Profesional champion
Colombia (2 berths)	Atlético Nacional	1988 Campeonato Profesional runner-up
Ecuador (2 berths)	Emelec	1988 Campeonato Ecuatoriano champion
Ecuador (2 berths)	Deportivo Quito	1988 Campeonato Ecuatoriano runner-up
Paraguay (2 berths)	Olimpia	1988 Primera División champion
Paraguay (2 berths)	Sol de América	1988 Primera División runner-up
Peru (2 berths)	Sporting Cristal	1988 Primera División champion
Peru (2 berths)	Universitario	1988 Primera División runner-up
Uruguay (2 berths)	Peñarol	1988 Liguilla Pre-Libertadores winner
Uruguay (2 berths)	Danubio	1988 Liguilla Pre-Libertadores runner-up
Venezuela (2 berths)	Marítimo	1987–88 Primera División champion
Venezuela (2 berths)	Unión Atlético Táchira	1987–88 Primera División runner-up

== Draw ==
The champions and runners-up of each football association were drawn into the same group along with another football association's participating teams. Three clubs from Uruguay competed as Nacional was champion of the 1988 Copa Libertadores. They entered the tournament in the Round of 16.

Group 1	Group 2	Group 3	Group 4	Group 5
Chile; Paraguay	Brazil; Venezuela	Colombia; Ecuador	Argentina; Peru	Bolivia; Uruguay

== Group stage ==
Twenty teams were divided into five groups of four teams each for the group stage. The top three teams of each group, as well as Nacional of Uruguay (who received a bye as winners of the Copa Libertadores 1988 of the tournament) qualified for the Round of 16.

=== Group 1 ===
Pos	Team	Pld	W	D	L	GF	GA	GD	Pts	Qualification	(Chile) COB	(Paraguay) SOL	(Paraguay) OLI	(Chile) COL
1	(Chile) Cobreloa	6	3	2	1	7	4	+3	8	Round of 16	—	1–0	2–0	2–2
2	(Paraguay) Sol de América	6	2	2	2	7	8	−1	6	Round of 16	0–0	—	5–4	1–0
3	(Paraguay) Olimpia	6	2	1	3	8	9	−1	5	Round of 16	2–0	0–0	—	2–0
4	(Chile) Colo-Colo	6	2	1	3	7	8	−1	5		0–2	3–1	2–0	—

Legend: Blue = home team win; Yellow = draw; Red = away team win.

=== Group 2 ===
Pos	Team	Pld	W	D	L	GF	GA	GD	Pts	Qualification	(Brazil) BAH	(Venezuela) TAC	(Brazil) INT	(Venezuela) MAR
1	(Brazil) Bahia	6	4	2	0	11	5	+6	10	Round of 16	—	4–1	1–0	3–2
2	(Venezuela) Unión Atlético Táchira	6	3	1	2	7	8	−1	7	Round of 16	1–1	—	1–0	2–0
3	(Brazil) Internacional	6	2	1	3	8	6	+2	5	Round of 16	1–2	3–1	—	3–0
4	(Venezuela) Marítimo	6	0	2	4	3	10	−7	2		0–0	0–1	1–1	—

Legend: Blue = home team win; Yellow = draw; Red = away team win.

=== Group 3 ===
Pos	Team	Pld	W	D	L	GF	GA	GD	Pts	Qualification	(Colombia) MIL	(Colombia) NAC	(Ecuador) QUI	(Ecuador) EME
1	(Colombia) Millonarios	6	4	2	0	12	3	+9	10	Round of 16	—	1–1	3–1	4–1
2	(Colombia) Atlético Nacional	6	2	3	1	8	7	+1	7	Round of 16	0–2	—	2–1	3–1
3	(Ecuador) Deportivo Quito	6	1	2	3	4	7	−3	4	Round of 16	0–0	1–1	—	1–0
4	(Ecuador) Emelec	6	1	1	4	4	11	−7	3		0–2	1–1	1–0	—

Legend: Blue = home team win; Yellow = draw; Red = away team win.

=== Group 4 ===
Pos	Team	Pld	W	D	L	GF	GA	GD	Pts	Qualification	(Argentina) BOC	(Argentina) RAC	(Peru) UNI	(Peru) CRI
1	(Argentina) Boca Juniors	6	3	1	2	9	7	+2	7	Round of 16	—	0–0	2–0	4–3
2	(Argentina) Racing	6	2	3	1	9	6	+3	7	Round of 16	2–3	—	2–0	2–0
3	(Peru) Universitario	6	3	0	3	7	6	+1	6	Round of 16	1–0	2–1	—	4–0
4	(Peru) Sporting Cristal	6	2	0	4	6	12	−6	4		1–0	1–2	1–0	—

Legend: Blue = home team win; Yellow = draw; Red = away team win.

==== Results ====
12 February 1989

Sporting Cristal (Peru)	1–0	(Peru) Universitario

Estadio Nacional, Lima
14 February 1989

Boca Juniors (Argentina)	0–0	(Argentina) Racing

20 February 1989

Universitario (Peru)	1–0	(Argentina) Boca Juniors

Estadio Nacional, Lima
23 February 1989

Sporting Cristal (Peru)	1–0	(Argentina) Boca Juniors

Estadio Nacional, Lima
28 February 1989

Universitario (Peru)	2–1	(Argentina) Racing

Estadio Nacional, Lima
2 March 1989

Sporting Cristal (Peru)	1–2	(Argentina) Racing

Estadio Nacional, Lima
8 March 1989

Racing (Argentina)	2–3	(Argentina) Boca Juniors

8 March 1989

Universitario (Peru)	4–0	(Peru) Sporting Cristal

Estadio Nacional, Lima
14 March 1989

Boca Juniors (Argentina)	2–0	(Peru) Universitario

17 March 1989

Racing (Argentina)	2–0	(Peru) Universitario

21 March 1989

Boca Juniors (Argentina)	4–3	(Peru) Sporting Cristal

24 March 1989

Racing (Argentina)	2–0	(Peru) Sporting Cristal

=== Group 5 ===
Pos	Team	Pld	W	D	L	GF	GA	GD	Pts	Qualification	(Uruguay) PEÑ	(Uruguay) DAN	(Bolivia) BOL	(Bolivia) STR
1	(Uruguay) Penarol	6	3	1	2	11	9	+2	7	Round of 16	—	2–0	5–0	1–1
2	(Uruguay) Danubio	6	3	0	3	7	7	0	6	Round of 16	4–1	—	1–0	1–0
3	(Bolivia) Bolivar	6	2	2	2	6	7	−1	6	Round of 16	3–0	3–1	—	0–0
4	(Bolivia) The Strongest	6	1	3	2	3	4	−1	5		1–2	1–0	0–0	—

Legend: Blue = home team win; Yellow = draw; Red = away team win.

== Final stages ==
=== Bracket ===
Round of 16
(Colombia) Atlético Nacional	2	1	3
(Argentina) Racing	0	2	2
(Colombia) Millonarios (p)	0	3	3 (4)
(Bolivia) Bolívar	1	2	3 (3)
(Chile) Cobreloa	0	1	1
(Ecuador) Deportivo Quito	0	0	0
(Uruguay) Danubio	0	3	3
(Uruguay) Nacional	0	1	1
(Uruguay) Peñarol	2	1	3
(Brazil) Internacional	6	2	8
(Brazil) Bahia	1	2	3
(Peru) Universitario	1	1	2
(Venezuela) Deportivo Táchira	0	3	3 (2)
(Paraguay) Sol de América (p)	3	0	3 (3)
(Argentina) Boca Juniors	0	5	5 (6)
(Paraguay) Olimpia (p)	2	3	5 (7)

Quarterfinals
(Colombia) Atlético Nacional	1	1	2
(Colombia) Millonarios	0	1	1
(Chile) Cobreloa	0	1	1
(Uruguay) Danubio	2	2	4
(Brazil) Internacional	1	0	1
(Brazil) Bahia	0	0	0
(Paraguay) Sol de América	0	4	4
(Paraguay) Olimpia	2	4	6

Semifinals
(Colombia) Atlético Nacional	0	6	6
(Uruguay) Danubio	0	0	0
(Brazil) Internacional	1	2	3 (3)
(Paraguay) Olimpia (p)	0	3	3 (5)

Finals
(Colombia) Atlético Nacional (p)	0	2	2 (5)
(Paraguay) Olimpia	2	0	2 (4)

=== Round of 16 ===
First leg matches were played between April 5 and April 6. Second leg matches were played on April 12 and April 13.

Team 1	Agg.	Team 2	1st leg	2nd leg
Atlético Nacional (Colombia)	3–2	(Argentina) Racing	2–0	1–2
Millonarios (Colombia)	3–3 (4–3 pk)	(Bolivia) Bolivar	0–1	3–2
Cobreloa (Chile)	1–0	(Ecuador) Deportivo Quito	0–0	1–0
Danubio (Uruguay)	3–1	(Uruguay) Nacional	3–1	0–0
Peñarol (Uruguay)	3–8	(Brazil) Internacional	2–6	1–2
Bahia (Brazil)	3–2	(Peru) Universitario	1–1	2–1
Deportivo Táchira (Venezuela)	3–3 (2–3 pk)	(Paraguay) Sol de América	0–3	3–0
Boca Juniors (Argentina)	5–5 (6–7 pk)	(Paraguay) Olimpia	0–2	5–3

=== Quarter-finals ===
First leg matches were played on April 19. Second leg matches were played on April 26.

Team 1	Agg.	Team 2	1st leg	2nd leg
Atlético Nacional (Colombia)	2–1	(Colombia) Millonarios	1–0	1–1
Cobreloa (Chile)	1–4	(Uruguay) Danubio	0–2	1–2
Internacional (Brazil)	1–0	(Brazil) Bahia	1–0	0–0
Sol de America (Paraguay)	4–6	(Paraguay) Olimpia	0–2	4–4

=== Semi-finals ===
First leg marches were played on May 10. Second leg matches were played on May 17

Team 1	Agg.	Team 2	1st leg	2nd leg
Atlético Nacional (Colombia)	6–0	(Uruguay) Danubio	0–0	6–0
Internacional (Brazil)	3–3 (3–5 pk)	(Paraguay) Olimpia	1–0	2–3

=== Finals ===
Team 1	Agg.	Team 2	1st leg	2nd leg
Atlético Nacional (Colombia)	2–2 (5–4 pk)	(Paraguay) Olimpia	0–2	2–0

25 May 1989	Olimpia (Paraguay)	2 – 0	(Colombia) Atlético Nacional	Estadio Defensores del Chaco, Asunción
	Bobadilla 36'; Sanabria 60'	Report		Attendance: 50,000; Referee: Wright (Brazil)

31 May 1989	Atlético Nacional (Colombia)	2 – 0 (5–4 p)	(Paraguay) Olimpia	Estadio El Campín, Bogotá
	Miño 46' (o.g.); Usuriaga 65'	Report		Attendance: 60,000; Referee: Loustau (Argentina)
	Penalties
	Escobar (penalty scored); Usuriaga (penalty scored); Tréllez (penalty scored); García (penalty missed); Higuita (penalty scored); Pérez (penalty missed); Gómez (penalty missed); Perea (penalty missed); Álvarez (penalty scored)		(penalty missed) Almeida; (penalty scored) Benítez; (penalty scored) Chamas; (penalty scored) Mendoza; (penalty scored) Amarilla; (penalty missed) González; (penalty missed) Guasch; (penalty missed) Balbuena; (penalty missed) Sanabria

== Champion ==
Copa Libertadores 1989:

Atlético Nacional
First Title
