= Gustavo Benítez (footballer, born 1953) =

Paraguayan footballer and coach

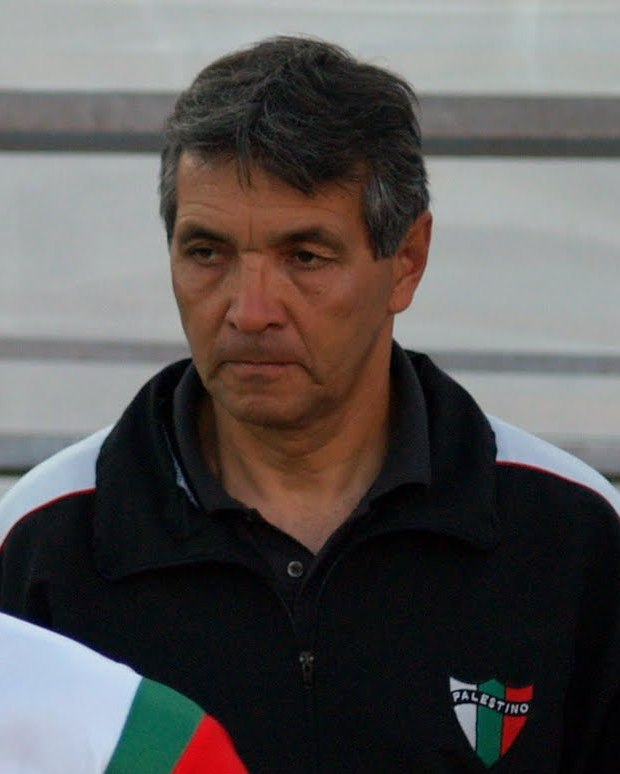
- Benítez with Palestino in 2011

Personal information
- Date of birth: 5 February 1953 (age 73)
- Place of birth: Paraguarí, Paraguay
- Height: 1.77 m (5 ft 10 in)

Senior career*
Years	Team	Apps	(Gls)
1974–1975	Olimpia Asunción		
1975–1980	Granada CF	135	(11)
1980–1985	Olimpia Asunción		
1985–1987	Atlético Nacional		
1987–1989	Olimpia Asunción		

International career
1975–1985	Paraguay	42	(2)

Managerial career
- 1994: Olimpia Asunción
- 1995–1998: Colo-Colo
- 1999–2000: Racing Santander
- 2001: Racing Santander
- 2003: Rayo Vallecano
- 2004–2005: Olimpia Asunción
- 2008: Cobreloa
- 2010–2011: Palestino
- 2013: Colo-Colo
- * Club domestic league appearances and goals

Gustavo Benítez (born 5 February 1953) is a retired Paraguayan football defender and coach.

== Playing career ==
As a player, Benítez won several national championships with Olimpia Asunción, where he was a key part of the defence.

He also made 42 appearances for the Paraguay national football team, and competed at the 1987 Copa América in Argentina.

== Coaching career ==
After retiring from football as a player he became a coach. At Chilean club Colo-Colo, he won three Chilean league championships (1996, 1997, 1998) and one Copa Chile (1996).

In January 1999, Benítez replaced the sacked Nando Yosu at the helm of Spanish La Liga club Racing de Santander, and saved the team from relegation. He resigned at the end of the following season, after a second consecutive 15th-place finish caused some dissent from the fans; his Russian striker Vladimir Beschastnykh told his country's Sport Express in January 2000 that he wanted the Cantabrians to lose so that Benítez could be dismissed.

Benítez returned to the Estadio El Sardinero in March 2001 after the dismissal of Gregorio Manzano, for what remained of the season plus two more. However, he lost his job on 5 October after a poor start to the Segunda División campaign following relegation, and was replaced by Quique Setién.

In February 2003, Benítez was back in Spain's top flight, taking over a Rayo Vallecano team placed in 18th. After winning twice in ten games, putting the team into their eventual last position, he was dismissed on 14 April and Antonio Iriondo appointed.

On 1 April 2010 CD Palestino officials hired the former Cobreloa and Colo-Colo coach to replace Jorge Aravena who quit about two weeks ago.
