= Walter Avalos =

Paraguayan footballer (born 1976)

Walter Ávalos
Personal information
- Full name: Walter David Ávalos Amarilla
- Date of birth: 8 February 1976 (age 50)
- Place of birth: Asunción, Paraguay
- Height: 1.77 m (5 ft 10 in)
- Position: Midfielder

Senior career*
Years	Team	Apps	(Gls)
1995–1996	Nacional		
1997	Deportes Tolima		
1998–2001	Olimpia	75	(12)
2001–2004	12 de Octubre	55	(6)
2004	Universidad de Chile	13	(0)
2005	Alianza Lima	16	(1)
2005	Estudiantes de Mérida	11	(4)
2006	Carabobo	13	(2)
2007	Portuguesa	9	(1)
2008	Unión Lara	11	(0)
2008–2009	Sportivo Luqueño	52	(11)
2010	Tacuary	13	(0)
2010	Sportivo Trinidense	14	(3)
2011–2012	Deportivo Capiatá		

International career
1995–2003	Paraguay	11	(0)

Managerial career
- Humaitá
Medal record
First place	Paraguayan Primera División	1999
First place	Paraguayan Primera División	2000
First place	Paraguayan Primera División	2002
First place	Chilean Primera División	2004
- * Club domestic league appearances and goals

Walter David Avalos Amarilla (born 8 February 1976) is a Paraguayan former footballer who played as a midfielder in Colombia, Chile, Peru and Venezuela as well as his native Paraguay. He made 11 appearances for the Paraguay national team.

== Career ==
- (Paraguay) Nacional 1995–1996
- (Colombia) Deportes Tolima 1997
- (Paraguay) Olimpia 1998–2001
- (Paraguay) 12 de Octubre 2001–2004
- Universidad de Chile 2004
- (Peru) Alianza Lima 2005
- (Venezuela) Estudiantes de Mérida 2005
- (Venezuela) Carabobo 2006
- (Venezuela) Portuguesa 2007
- (Venezuela) Unión Lara 2008
- (Paraguay) Sportivo Luqueño 2008–2009
- (Paraguay) Tacuary 2010
- (Paraguay) Sportivo Trinidense 2010
- (Paraguay) Deportivo Capiatá 2011–2012

== Personal life ==
Walter is the father of the footballer Enzo David Ávalos.

== Honours ==
Olimpia

- Paraguayan championship: 1998, 1999, 2000
