= Vidal Sanabria =

Paraguayan footballer (born 1967)

Personal information
- Full name: Vidal Sanabria Acuña
- Date of birth: 11 April 1967 (age 59)
- Place of birth: San Lorenzo, Paraguay
- Position: Midfielder

Youth career
- 1983–1984: Club 13 Tuyutí
- 1985–1986: Guaraní

Senior career*
| Years | Team | Apps | (Gls) |
| 1987–1995 | Olimpia | ? | (?) |
| 1996 | River Plate (Asuncion) | ? | (?) |
| 1997 | Deportivo Pereira | 11 | (0) |
| 1998 | Libertad | ? | (?) |
| 1999 | Resistencia | ? | (?) |
| 2000 | Sportivo Luqueño | ? | (?) |
| 2001 | Sol de América | ? | (?) |

International career
| 1989–1996 | Paraguay | 21 | (1) |
- * Club domestic league appearances and goals

Carlos Vidal Sanabria Acuña (born 11 April 1967 in San Lorenzo, Paraguay) is a former football midfielder from Paraguay.

== Club ==
Sanabria started his football career in the youth divisions of Club 13 Tuyutí of Capiatá and then moved to Guaraní before making his debut for Olimpia Asunción in 1987. His career in Olimpia would last until 1995, winning several national and international championships with the club. Afterwards, Sanabria had brief stints in several clubs such as River Plate (Asuncion), Deportivo Pereira, Libertad, Resistencia, Sportivo Luqueño and Sol de América before retiring.

== International ==
Sanabria made his international debut for the Paraguay national football team on 1 July 1989 in a 1989 Copa América match against Peru (5-2 win), substituting Alfredo Mendoza in the 86th minute. He obtained a total number of 21 international caps, scoring one goal for the national side. Sanabria played in the Copa America 1989, Copa America 1991 and Copa America 1993.

== Honours ==
=== Club ===
- Olimpia
  - Paraguayan Primera División: 1988, 1989, 1993, 1995
  - Copa Libertadores: 1990
  - Supercopa Sudamericana: 1990
  - Recopa Sudamericana: 1990
  - Torneo República: 1992
