= Jorge Delgado (footballer, born 1975) =

Uruguayan footballer

Personal information
- Full name: Jorge Luis Delgado Rueda
- Date of birth: 30 September 1975 (age 51)
- Place of birth: Montevideo, Uruguay
- Height: 1.86 m (6 ft 1 in)
- Position: Striker

Youth career
- La Bomba (five-a-side)
- Nacional

Senior career*
Years	Team	Apps	(Gls)
1994	Shanghai Shenhua		
1996–1998	Nacional	20	(10)
1998	Liverpool Montevideo		
1999	Nacional	20	(4)
2000–2001	Numancia	25	(6)
2001	→ Elche (loan)	8	(0)
2002	Al-Nassr		
2002	Montevideo Wanderers		
2003	Racing de Ferrol	10	(0)
2003	Deportivo Cuenca	11	(2)
2004	Everton	13	(2)
2005	Deportivo Colonia	8	(1)
2006–2007	La Luz	25	(9)
2007	Cerro	6	(1)
2008	Aurora	9	(2)
2008–2009	Juventud Las Piedras	1	(0)
2009	Durazno	10	(4)
- * Club domestic league appearances and goals

Jorge Luis Delgado Rueda (born September 30, 1975, in Montevideo) is a retired Uruguayan football striker.

== Teams ==
- (Uruguay) La Bomba (five-a-side) (youth)
- (Uruguay) Nacional (youth)
- (China) Shanghai Shenhua 1994
- (Uruguay) Nacional 1996–1998
- (Uruguay) Liverpool Montevideo 1998
- (Uruguay) Nacional 1999
- (Spain) Numancia 2000–2001
- (Spain) Elche 2001
- (Saudi Arabia) Al-Nassr 2002
- (Uruguay) Montevideo Wanderers 2002
- (Spain) Racing de Ferrol 2003
- (Ecuador) Deportivo Cuenca 2003
- (Chile) Everton 2004
- (Uruguay) Deportivo Colonia 2005
- (Uruguay) La Luz 2006–2007
- (Uruguay) Cerro 2007
- (Bolivia) Aurora 2008
- (Uruguay) Juventud Las Piedras 2008–2009
- (Uruguay) Durazno 2009

== Post-retirement ==
Delgado started a football academy in Maldonado, Uruguay, alongside the former Uruguay international footballer Richard Morales.
