= Gustavo Restrepo (footballer) =

Colombian footballer (born 1969)

Personal information
- Full name: Gustavo Adolfo Restrepo Vásquez
- Date of birth: 24 September 1969 (age 57)
- Place of birth: Medellín, Colombia
- Height: 1.69 m (5 ft 7 in)
- Position: Midfielder

Senior career*
Years	Team	Apps	(Gls)
1988–1993	Atlético Nacional		
1994	Once Caldas		
1995–1996	Envigado		
1996–1997	Atlético Nacional		
1997–1998	Atlético Bucaramanga		
1999	Independiente Medellín		
1999	Atlético Bucaramanga		

International career
1990–1990	Colombia	6	(0)
- * Club domestic league appearances and goals

Gustavo Adolfo Restrepo Vásquez (born 24 September 1969) is a Colombian former footballer who played as a midfielder. He competed in the men's tournament at the 1992 Summer Olympics.
