= Jaime Arango =

Colombian footballer (born 1962)

Personal information
- Full name: Jaime de Jesús Arango Estrada
- Date of birth: 11 January 1962 (age 64)
- Place of birth: Medellín, Colombia
- Height: 1.67 m (5 ft 6 in)
- Position: Striker

Senior career*
Years	Team	Apps	(Gls)
1981–?	Independiente Medellín		
1986	Caldas		
1987–1992	Atlético Nacional		
1993	Envigado		
1994–1997	Atlético Nacional		

International career
1988–1989	Colombia	5	(1)
- * Club domestic league appearances and goals

Jaime Arango (born 11 January 1962) is a retired Colombian football striker.
