= René Higuita =

Colombian footballer (born 1966)

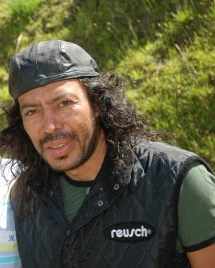
- Higuita in 2007

Personal information
- Full name: José René Higuita Zapata
- Date of birth: 27 August 1966 (age 60)
- Place of birth: Medellín, Colombia
- Height: 1.75 m (5 ft 9 in)
- Position: Goalkeeper

Team information
- Current team: Atlético Nacional (goalkeeper coach)

Youth career
- Millonarios

Senior career*
| Years | Team | Apps | (Gls) |
| 1985 | Millonarios | 16 | (7) |
| 1986–1991 | Atlético Nacional | 112 | (1) |
| 1991–1992 | Real Valladolid | 15 | (2) |
| 1993–1997 | Atlético Nacional | 69 | (1) |
| 1997–1998 | Veracruz | 30 | (2) |
| 1999–2000 | Independiente Medellín | 20 | (11) |
| 2000–2001 | Real Cartagena | 21 | (0) |
| 2001–2002 | Atlético Junior | 4 | (0) |
| 2002–2003 | Deportivo Pereira | 13 | (0) |
| 2004 | Aucas | 35 | (3) |
| 2007 | Guaros FC | 10 | (5) |
| 2008 | Deportivo Rionegro | 10 | (3) |
| 2008–2010 | Deportivo Pereira | 12 | (5) |
| Total | | 380 | (40) |

International career
| 1987–1999 | Colombia | 68 | (3) |
Medal record
Men's football
Representing Colombia
Copa América
| Third place | 1987 Argentina |
| Third place | 1993 Ecuador |
| Third place | 1995 Uruguay |
- * Club domestic league appearances and goals

José René Higuita Zapata (Spanish pronunciation: [reˈne jˈɣita]; born 27 August 1966) is a Colombian former professional footballer who played as a goalkeeper. He was nicknamed El Loco ("The Madman") for his high-risk 'sweeper-keeper' playing style and his flair for the dramatic, and sometimes even scoring goals despite being a goalkeeper.

Higuita's style of play, which was first shown to a global audience during the 1990 FIFA World Cup, was pioneering in influencing goalkeepers to take more responsibility for situations farther from the goal.

IFFHS ranked Higuita the 8th best South American keeper in history. He is also ranked as one of the 10 highest-scoring goalkeepers in history, with 41 goals overall.

== Early life ==
Higuita was born in Castilla, a middle-low class neighborhood in the city of Medellín, Antioquia, Colombia to Jorge Zapata and María Dioselina Higuita. His father left the family when Higuita was a child, so he was raised by his mother. His mother later died when he was very young, so he was taken care of by his grandmother Ana Felisa.

== Club career ==
Higuita started his playing career with Millonarios and transferred to Atlético Nacional in 1986. He played the majority of his club career with the Colombian side where he helped the team win the Colombian League on two occasions as well as the Copa Libertadores and Copa Interamericana, both in 1989. The Copa Libertadores final went to a penalty shoot-out in which Higuita made four saves and scored one penalty himself. After leaving Atlético, he moved to Spain to play with Real Valladolid for one season, before going back to Atletico Nacional for four years. He then left for Mexico to play for Veracruz before returning to the Colombian league to play for Atletico's city rivals, Independiente Medellín.

He briefly retired in 2005 after failing a drug test while playing for Aucas.

He came out of retirement on 21 July 2007 to sign for Venezuelan club Guaros FC. In January 2008, aged 41, he signed for Colombian second-division team Deportivo Rionegro. In June 2008 he signed for another Colombia team, Deportivo Pereira, and finally retired on 25 January 2010.

== International career ==
Higuita's first major tournament was the 1987 Copa América, where the team was knocked out in the semi-finals. In the 1990 FIFA World Cup, he played an important part to lead the country into the round of 16 for the first time. However, Higuita's unorthodox playing style caused a mistake by him that knocked Colombia out of the World Cup, when he tried to feint Cameroon striker Roger Milla but failed, and Milla dispossessed him and scored, which put Cameroon through to the quarter-finals. Higuita described it as "a mistake as big as a house". As a result of such behaviour, Higuita was nicknamed El Loco ("The Madman").

Due to his imprisonment in 1993, Higuita was not deemed fit to be picked for Colombia's 1994 FIFA World Cup squad.

He played in the 1991 Copa América where the team finished fourth. His last call-up for the national team was for the 1999 Copa América.

Higuita often took set-pieces for the Colombia national team; in all, he scored three goals in his 68 international appearances.

== Player profile ==
=== Style of play ===
On the pitch, Higuita was known for his dramatic flair, composure under pressure, and eccentric playing style, often taking unnecessary risks and actively coming out of his area to anticipate opponents, play the ball out to defenders, undertake individual dribbling runs, and attempt to score goals, which led him to be described as a 'sweeper-keeper'; he was, therefore, a pioneer in influencing other goalkeepers to take more responsibility for situations farther from the goal. Although he was a goalkeeper, Higuita also became known for scoring directly from free-kicks, as well as penalties.

=== Reception ===
Considered to be one of the greatest goalkeepers of his generation, as well as one of the best Colombian and South American goalkeepers of all time, IFFHS ranked Higuita the eighth-best South American goalkeeper of the 20th century.

=== Scorpion kick ===
In addition to his role in revolutionising the goalkeeping position, Higuita reportedly invented the scorpion kick, a movement which involves the player jumping forward, positioning their legs over their head, and in doing so, kicking the ball away with their heels. Higuita had the idea for a scorpion kick after watching a similar kick by a child while filming an advertisement. Higuita's most notable use of the scorpion was when he performed it while clearing a cross from Jamie Redknapp during a friendly against England at Wembley Stadium on 6 September 1995, earning him considerable media attention. It ranked 94th in Channel 4's 100 Greatest Sporting Moments in 2002.

== Coaching career ==
Higuita has expressed a wish to coach the Colombia national team and in December 2008 he got the job of goalkeeper coach for his former club Real Valladolid.

He joined Al Nassr FC in Saudi Arabia in 2011, and was the club goalkeeper coach for about 5 years, until 2016.

He rejoined Atletico Nacional on 28 June 2017 after receiving a coaching job as the goalkeeping coach. Upon rejoining, he said "the dream of my life was to return to Atletico Nacional".

== Personal life ==
René Higuita's wife is Magnolia, and they have two children, Andrés and Pamela. He is also the father of Cindy Carolina, the daughter of his deceased first wife. He is also the grandfather of two girls and a boy.

Higuita was friends with Diego Maradona and played in the Argentine's farewell match in 2001.

Higuita was imprisoned in 1993 after getting involved in a kidnapping. Acting as a go-between for the drug barons Pablo Escobar and Carlos Molina, he was largely responsible for securing the release of Molina's daughter by delivering the ransom money. He received $64,000 for his services, which breaks Colombian law as it is an offence to profit from a kidnapping. He was incarcerated for seven months before being released without charge. Commenting on the case, he stated, "I'm a footballer, I didn't know anything about kidnapping laws."

In the ESPN documentary "The Two Escobars", Higuita claimed that he was arrested for visiting Pablo during his time in prison with the desire to thank him for turning himself in, thus stabilizing Colombia for a short period. He supported this theory claiming that all he was asked during questioning was solely about Pablo Escobar himself and no kidnapping.

Because of the term in prison, Higuita was deemed unfit to play in the 1994 FIFA World Cup. In another scandal, he tested positive for cocaine on 23 November 2004 while playing for Aucas, an Ecuadorian football club.

In 2005, Higuita participated in the reality TV program La Isla de Los famosos: Una Aventura Pirata ("The Island of the Famous: A Pirate Adventure"), a show similar to Survivor. Also in 2005, he underwent plastic surgery to completely change his appearance. Higuita has expressed the wish to become more politically active.

In July 2024, the international online casino and sportsbook company Betsson, which has a large presence in his native Colombia, announced Higuita as a brand ambassador.

== Career statistics ==
Appearances and goals by national team and year
| National team | Year | Apps | Goals |
|---|---|---|---|
| Colombia | 1987 | 5 | 0 |
| Colombia | 1988 | 6 | 1 |
| Colombia | 1989 | 16 | 2 |
| Colombia | 1990 | 10 | 0 |
| Colombia | 1991 | 11 | 0 |
| Colombia | 1992 | 0 | 0 |
| Colombia | 1993 | 1 | 0 |
| Colombia | 1994 | 0 | 0 |
| Colombia | 1995 | 13 | 0 |
| Colombia | 1996 | 2 | 0 |
| Colombia | 1997 | 2 | 0 |
| Colombia | 1998 | 0 | 0 |
| Colombia | 1999 | 2 | 0 |
| Total | | 68 | 3 |

Scores and results list Colombia's goal tally first, score column indicates score after each Higuita goal.

List of international goals scored by René Higuita
| No. | Date | Venue | Opponent | Score | Result | Competition |
|---|---|---|---|---|---|---|
| 1 | 19 May 1988 | Helsinki Olympic Stadium, Helsinki, Finland | Finland | 2–1 | 3–1 | Friendly |
| 2 | 3 February 1989 | Hernán Ramírez Villegas Stadium, Pereira, Colombia | Peru | 1–0 | 1–0 | Friendly |
| 3 | 3 July 1989 | Arena Fonte Nova, Salvador, Brazil | Venezuela | 1–0 | 4–2 | 1989 Copa América |

== Honours ==
Atlético Nacional

- Categoría Primera A: 1991, 1994
- Copa Libertadores: 1989
- Copa Interamericana: 1989,1997

Individual

- South American Team of the Year: 1989, 1990
- Best goalkeeper in South America: 1989
- ACORD Colombia|Deportista del Año: 1989
- Golden Foot Legends Award: 2009
- South American Footballer of the Year: 3rd place, 1989, 1990

As goalkeeping coach

- Saudi Pro League: 2014
- Crown Prince's Cup: 2014

== See also ==
- List of doping cases in sport
- List of goalscoring goalkeepers
