= List of Argentina international footballers =

This is a list of players that have played for the Argentina national football team. The players are listed in chronological order of their surnames. Additionally, their number of caps and goals are stated.

Key
§	Player is active in international football and have received call-up in last 12 months
§	Player haven't been called up in last 12 months, but is still available for selection

== Players ==
As of matches played since 17 November 2026

Players	Caps	Goals	First cap	Last cap	Honors
Roberto Abbondanzieri	49	0	2004	2008	
David Acevedo	5	0	1967	1967	
Walter Acevedo	1	0	2010	2010	
Alberto Acosta	19	3	1992	1995	1992, 1993(AF), 1993
Lautaro Acosta	2	0	2017	2017	
Oscar Acosta	1	0	1987	1987	
Marcos Acuña	62	0	2016	2026	2021, 2022(F), 2022, 2024
Sergio Agüero	101	41	2006	2021	2021
Roberto Aguirre	8	0	1968	1969	
Oscar Ahumada	1	0	2012	2012	
Pablo Aimar	52	8	1999	2009	
Mauro Airez	4	1	1988	1989	
Lucas Alario	9	3	2016	2020	
José Albornoz	3	1	1996	1996	
Rafael Albrecht	39	3	1961	1969	
Carlos Alfaro Moreno	11	2	1989	1991	
Roque Alfaro	5	0	1987	1987	
Angel Allegri	4	0	1950	1951	
Thiago Almada	23	5	2022	2026	2022
Matías Almeyda	35	1	1996	2003	
Sergio Almirón	6	4	1985	1986	1986
Norberto Alonso	19	4	1972	1983	1978
Ricardo Altamirano	27	1	1991	1995	1991, 1992, 1993(AF), 1993
Julián Álvarez	64	19	2021	2026	2021, 2022(F), 2022, 2024
Ricardo Álvarez	9	1	2011	2014	
Luis Amuchástegui	3	0	1981	1983	
Edgardo Andrada	20	0	1961	1969	
Esteban Andrada	4	0	2019	2019	
Mariano Andujar	11	0	2009	2014	
Marcos Angeleri	4	0	2009	2011	
Antonio Angelillo	11	11	1955	1957	
Cristian Ansaldi	5	1	2009	2014	
Aarón Anselmino	1	0	2026	2026	
Tomás Aranda	1	0	2026	2026	
Osvaldo Ardiles	52	8	1975	1982	1978
Franco Armani	19	0	2018	2023	2021, 2022(F), 2022, 2024
Rodolfo Arruabarrena	6	0	1994	2006	
Luis Artime	25	24	1961	1967	
Julio Asad	7	1	1975	1976	
Omar Asad	2	0	1995	1995	
Santiago Ascacíbar	3	0	2018	2018	
Leonardo Astrada	32	1	1991	1999	1991
Roque Avellay	15	1	1968	1974	
Ludovico Avio	3	1	1958	1958	
Luciano Aued	2	1	2011	2011	
Roberto Ayala	115	7	1994	2007	
Rubén Ayala	25	11	1969	1974	
Carlos Babington	13	2	1973	1974	
Abel Balbo	37	11	1989	1998	
Agustin Balbuena	8	0	1974	1975	
Emilio Baldonedo	6	7	1940	1940	
Leonardo Balerdi	14	0	2019	2025	
Hector Baley	13	0	1978	1982	1978
Éver Banega	65	6	2008	2018	
Juan Barbas	33	0	1979	1985	
Valentín Barco	7	2	2024	2026	
Hernán Barcos	4	0	2012	2012	
Angel Bargas	30	1	1971	1974	
Guillermo Barros Schelotto	10	0	1995	1999	
José María Basanta	12	0	2013	2014	
Alfio Basile	8	1	1968	1973	
Christian Bassedas	22	0	1994	1999	
Fabián Basualdo	29	0	1991	1993	1991, 1992, 1993
José Basualdo	31	0	1989	1995	1993
Sergio Batista	39	0	1985	1990	1986
Gabriel Batistuta	78	56	1991	2002	1991, 1992, 1993(AF), 1993
Sebastián Battaglia	10	0	2003	2009	
Rodrigo Battaglia	2	0	2018	2018	
Edgardo Bauza	3	0	1981	1990	
Raúl Belén	31	8	1959	1963	
Ernesto Belis	1	1	1934	1934	
Fernando Belluschi	6	0	2005	2017	
Dario Benedetto	5	0	2017	2019	
Jorge Benítez	2	0	1977	1977	
Walter Benítez	1	0	2024	2024	
Santiago Beltrán	1	0	2026	2026	
Gonzalo Bergessio	3	2	2008	2009	
Eduardo Berizzo	13	0	1996	2000	
Raúl Bernao	15	4	1965	1970	
Hernán Bernardello	1	0	2009	2009	
Lucas Bernardi	6	0	2004	2005	
Attilio Bernasconi	2	0	1935	1935	
Sergio Berti	23	2	1991	1998	
Facundo Bertoglio	1	2	2010	2010	
Nicolás Bertolo	2	0	2011	2011	
Daniel Bertoni	31	12	1974	1982	1978
Claudio Biaggio	1	0	1995	1995	
Carlos Bianchi	14	7	1970	1972	
Lucas Biglia	58	1	2011	2018	
Daniel Bilos	3	1	2005	2006	
David Bisconti	5	1	1991	1991	
Domingo Blanco	1	0	2019	2019	
Sebastián Blanco	2	1	2009	2010	
Ricardo Bochini	28	0	1973	1986	1986
Mario Bolatti	12	1	2009	2011	
Roberto Bonano	13	0	1996	2000	
Jorge Borelli	13	0	1992	1994	1992, 1993(AF), 1993
Claudio Borghi	9	1	1985	1986	1986
Juan José Borrelli	7	0	1994	1997	
Mauro Boselli	4	1	2009	2011	
Carlos Bossio	11	0	1994	1996	
Juan Botasso	9	0	1929	1933	
Jonathan Bottinelli	3	0	2007	2011	
Ramon Boveda	8	1	1972	1975	
Lucas Boyé	1	0	2022	2022	
Mario Boyé	17	7	1945	1951	
Rodrigo Braña	9	0	2009	2013	
Rubén Bravo	3	1	1950	1951	
Miguel Ángel Brindisi	46	17	1969	1974	
José Luis Brown	36	1	1983	1989	1986
Emiliano Buendía	2	0	2022	2025	
Facundo Buonanotte	2	0	2023	2024	
Guillermo Burdisso	1	1	2010	2010	
Nicolás Burdisso	49	2	2003	2011	
Germán Burgos	35	0	1995	2002	
Jorge Burruchaga	57	13	1983	1990	1986
Fabricio Bustos	4	0	2018	2018	
Willy Caballero	5	0	2018	2018	
Ariel Cabral	2	0	2011	2011	
Fernando Cáceres	24	1	1992	1997	1993
Diego Cagna	19	1	1992	1999	1992
Gabriel Calderon	23	1	1981	1990	
José Luis Calderón	5	0	1997	1997	
Facundo Cambeses	1	0	2025	2025	
Nicolás Capaldo	1	0	2026	2026	
Oscar Celics	6	0	1966	1967	
Esteban Cambiasso	52	5	2000	2011	
Julián Camino	11	0	1983	1985	
Hugo Campagnaro	17	0	2012	2014	
Cristian Campestrini	2	0	2009	2010	
Patricio Camps	2	0	1996	1996	
Claudio Caniggia	50	16	1987	2002	1991, 1992, 1993(AF)
Héctor Canteros	2	0	2011	2011	
Ignacio Canuto	3	1	2009	2010	
Vladislao Cap	11	1	1958	1963	
Valentín Carboni	3	0	2024	2024	2024
Juan Carlos Cárdenas	5	0	1967	1976	
Rodolfo Cardoso	7	1	1995	1998	
Neri Cardozo	1	0	2007	2007	
Raúl Cardozo	4	0	1997	1997	
César Carignano	3	0	2003	2003	
Daniel Carnevalli	26	0	1972	1974	
Juan Carlos Carone	2	1	1967	1967	
Luis Alberto Carranza	1	0	1994	1994	
Jorge Carrascosa	30	1	1970	1977	
Amadeo Carrizo	20	0	1954	1964	
Juan Pablo Carrizo	12	0	2007	2012	
Matías Caruzzo	6	0	2009	2017	
Milton Casco	3	0	2015	2019	
Taty Castellanos	2	0	2024	2024	
Santiago Castro	1	0	2026	2026	
Lucas Castromán	5	0	2000	2005	
Pablo Cavallero	26	0	1996	2004	
Fernando Cavenaghi	4	0	2008	2008	
Agustín Cejas	6	0	1963	1964	
Christian Cellay	2	0	2011	2011	
Francisco Cerro	1	0	2012	2012	
Franco Cervi	4	1	2018	2018	
José Chamot	43	2	1993	2002	
Raúl Chaparro	1	0	1982	1982	
Cristian Chávez	4	1	2011	2011	
Enrique Chazarreta	11	0	1973	1974	
Roberto Cherro	16	13	1926	1937	
Pedro de Ciancio	1	0	1960	1960	
Néstor Clausen	26	1	1983	1989	1986
Victorio Cocco	6	1	1968	1974	
Fabricio Coloccini	39	1	2003	2014	
Oreste Corbatta	43	18	1956	1962	
Ángel Correa	28	3	2015	2025	2021, 2022
Joaquín Correa	20	4	2017	2022	2021
Hugo Coscia	9	4	1975	1979	
Tino Costa	2	0	2011	2012	
Franco Costanzo	1	0	2003	2003	
Néstor Craviotto	11	2	1989	1993	1991, 1992, 1993(AF), 1993
Hernán Crespo	64	35	1995	2007	
Jonatan Cristaldo	1	0	2011	2011	
Hernán Cristante	6	0	1989	1995	
Diego Crosa	2	0	2000	2000	
Julio Cruz	22	3	1997	2008	
Osvaldo Héctor Cruz	21	3	1953	1961	
Ernesto Cucchiaroni	11	0	1955	1958	
José Luis Cuciuffo	21	0	1985	1989	1986
Víctor Cuesta	3	1	2016	2016	
Leandro Cufré	17	0	2000	2006	
Héctor Cúper	3	0	1984	1984	
Andrés D'Alessandro	28	3	2003	2011	
Jesús Dátolo	3	2	2009	2009	
Vicente de la Mata	6	0	1965	1966	
Rodrigo De Paul	95	2	2018	2026	2021, 2022(F), 2022, 2024
Matías Defederico	2	1	2009	2011	
César Delgado	20	2	2003	2005	
Marcelo Delgado	18	0	1995	2002	
José Della Torre	5	0	1930	1930	
Pedro Dellacha	35	0	1953	1958	
Attilio Demaría	3	0	1930	1931	
Martín Demichelis	52	2	2005	2016	
Germán Denis	5	0	2007	2007	
Oscar Dertycia	19	2	1984	1988	
Leandro Desábato	5	0	2011	2011	
Gustavo Dezotti	7	1	1988	1990	
Cata Díaz	12	1	2003	2009	
Gastón Díaz	1	0	2011	2011	
Hernán Díaz	28	3	1987	1998	
Ramón Díaz	22	10	1979	1982	
Ángel Di María	145	31	2008	2024	2021, 2022(F), 2022, 2024
Franco Di Santo	3	0	2012	2013	
Alfredo Di Stéfano	6	6	1947	1947	
Alejandro Domínguez	1	0	2003	2003	
Federico Domínguez	1	0	2003	2003	
Jorge Domínguez	3	0	1984	1984	
Nicolás Domínguez	11	0	2019	2021	2021
Rogelio Domínguez	58	0	1951	1963	
Sebastián Domínguez	8	0	2009	2013	
Aldo Duscher	3	0	2005	2005	
Paulo Dybala	40	4	2015	2024	2022(F), 2022
Mariano Echeverría	1	0	2010	2010	
Carlos Enrique	9	0	1991	1991	1991
Héctor Enrique	11	0	1986	1989	1986
Walter Erviti	1	0	2010	2010	
Marcelo Escudero	9	1	1994	1996	
Juan Esnáider	3	0	1995	1999	
Iván Esperón	10	1	1940	1942	
Marcelo Espina	15	1	1994	1996	
Juan Alberto Estrada	18	0	1936	1941	
Juan Evaristo	26	6	1923	1930	
Mario Evaristo	9	3	1929	1930	
Néstor Fabbri	22	2	1987	1996	
Julio César Falcioni	1	0	1989	1989	
Ernesto Farías	1	0	2005	2005	
Federico Fazio	10	1	2011	2018	
Darío Felman	1	0	1977	1977	
Augusto Fernández	16	1	2011	2016	
Enzo Fernández	53	8	2022	2026	2022, 2024
Equi Fernández	1	0	2026	2026	
Federico Fernández	32	3	2011	2014	
Ignacio Fernández	1	0	2017	2017	
José Luis Fernández	1	0	2010	2010	
Juan Ramón Fernández	1	0	1999	1999	
Leandro Fernández	5	1	2004	2005	
Juan José Ferraro	8	4	1947	1953	
Manuel Ferreira	21	11	1927	1930	
Roberto Ferreiro	18	0	1962	1966	
Alexis Ferrero	1	0	2009	2009	
Enzo Ferrero	3	1	1974	1974	
Bernabé Ferreyra	4	0	1930	1937	
Victor Ferreyra	2	1	1991	1991	
Luciano Figueroa	15	9	2004	2005	
Ubaldo Fillol	58	0	1974	1985	1978
Rodolfo Fischer	35	12	1967	1972	
Turu Flores	2	0	1994	1994	
Leonel Flores	3	0	2026	2026	
Mauro Formica	1	0	2011	2011	
Juan Foyth	22	0	2019	2025	2022(F), 2022
Alan Franco	1	0	2018	2018	
Darío Franco	22	6	1991	1994	1991, 1992, 1993(AF), 1993
Leo Franco	4	0	2004	2006	
Joaquín Freitas	1	0	2026	2026	
Fabricio Fuentes	1	0	2005	2005	
Esteban Fuertes	1	0	2009	2009	
Ramiro Funes Mori	26	2	2015	2018	
Rogelio Funes Mori	1	0	2012	2012	
Juan Gilberto Funes	4	0	1987	1987	
Adrián Gabbarini	3	0	2010	2011	
Fernando Gago	62	0	2007	2017	
Adolfo Gaich	1	0	2019	2019	
Nicolás Gaitán	19	2	2009	2016	
Alberto Galateo	1	1	1934	1934	
Leonel Galeano	1	0	2010	2010	
Fernando Galetto	1	0	1995	1995	
Marcelo Gallardo	44	13	1994	2003	
Américo Gallego	73	3	1975	1982	1978
Luciano Galletti	13	1	2000	2005	
Luis Galván	34	0	1975	1982	1978
Rubén Galván	3	0	1978	1978	1978
Fernando Gamboa	15	0	1991	1996	1991
Bernardo Gandulla	1	0	1940	1940	
Ezequiel Garay	32	0	2007	2015	
Ariel Garcé	4	0	2003	2010	
Claudio García	13	3	1991	1993	1991, 1992, 1993
Enrique García	35	9	1935	1943	
Javier García	1	0	2011	2011	
Ricardo Gareca	20	5	1981	1986	
Alejandro Garnacho	8	0	2023	2024	2024
Francisco Garrafa	2	0	1933	1933	
Oscar Garré	39	0	1983	1988	1986
Hugo Gatti	18	0	1966	1977	
Paulo Gazzaniga	1	0	2018	2018	
Agustín Giay	8	0	2026	2026	
Emmanuel Gigliotti	1	0	2011	2011	
Gastón Giménez	1	0	2018	2018	
Blas Giunta	7	0	1987	1991	1991
Ricardo Giusti	53	0	1983	1990	1986
Paolo Goltz	1	0	2010	2010	
Alejandro Gómez	17	3	2017	2022	2021, 2022(F), 2022
José Luis Gómez	1	0	2017	2017	
Marcelo Gómez	1	0	1995	1995	
Valentín Gómez	1	0	2026	2026	
Kily González	56	9	1995	2005	
Lucho González	45	7	2003	2011	
Mariano González	9	0	2003	2008	
Nacho González	4	0	1997	1997	
Nico González	60	6	2019	2026	2021, 2022(F), 2024
Néstor Gorosito	19	1	1989	1997	1993(AF), 1993
Sergio Goycochea	44	0	1987	1994	1991, 1992, 1993(AF), 1993
Jorge Griffa	4	0	1959	1959	
Ernesto Grillo	21	8	1952	1960	
Andrés Guglielminpietro	6	0	1999	1999	
Juan Héctor Guidi	37	0	1956	1961	
Pablo Guiñazú	16	0	2003	2013	
Jonás Gutiérrez	22	1	2007	2011	
Nahuel Guzmán	6	0	2014	2017	
Gabriel Hauche	5	3	2009	2011	
Gabriel Heinze	72	3	2003	2010	
Ramón Heredia	30	2	1970	1975	
Gonzalo Higuaín	75	31	2009	2018	
René Houseman	55	13	1973	1979	1978
Claudio Husaín	14	1	1997	2002	
Ariel Ibagaza	1	0	2004	2004	
Nelson Ibáñez	1	0	2010	2010	
Hugo Ibarra	11	0	1999	2007	
Mauro Icardi	8	1	2013	2018	
Ricardo Infante	5	2	1947	1952	
Juan Insaurralde	2	0	2009	2009	
Emiliano Insúa	6	0	2009	2017	
Federico Insúa	15	0	2003	2010	
Rubén Darío Insúa	5	0	1983	1984	
Luis Islas	30	0	1984	1994	1986, 1992, 1993(AF), 1993
Franco Jara	4	1	2010	2011	
Omar Jorge	2	0	1983	1983	
Walter Kannemann	6	0	2018	2018	
Mario Kempes	43	20	1973	1982	1978
Daniel Killer	22	3	1975	1978	1978
Matías Kranevitter	9	0	2015	2017	
Ricardo La Volpe	8	0	1975	1978	1978
Ángel Labruna	37	17	1942	1958	
Erik Lamela	25	3	2011	2018	
Alejandro Lanari	1	0	1991	1991	1991
Manuel Lanzini	5	1	2017	2019	
Pedro Larraquy	4	0	1979	1979	
Omar Larrosa	11	0	1977	1978	1978
Diego Latorre	6	1	1991	1991	1991
Miguel Ángel Lauri	10	1	1928	1935	
Ezequiel Lavezzi	51	9	2007	2016	
Ernesto Lazzatti	4	0	1936	1937	
Cristian Raúl Ledesma	4	0	2007	2008	
Pablo Ledesma	4	0	2007	2007	
Gustavo Lombardi	2	0	1997	1997	
Juan Francisco Lombardo	37	0	1952	1959	
Claudio López	55	10	1995	2003	
Gustavo López	32	4	1994	2003	
José Manuel López	9	1	2025	2026	
Juan José López	1	1	1972	1974	
Lisandro López	7	1	2005	2009	
Lisandro López	4	0	2011	2012	
Néstor Lorenzo	13	1	1988	1990	
Félix Loustau	28	10	1945	1952	
Giovani Lo Celso	69	5	2017	2026	2021, 2022(F), 2024
Leopoldo Luque	43	21	1975	1981	1978
Germán Lux	6	0	2005	2005	
Alexis Mac Allister	59	8	2019	2026	2022(F), 2022, 2024
Carlos Mac Allister	3	0	1993	1993	
Kevin Mac Allister	1	0	2025	2025	
Jonatan Maidana	5	0	2011	2016	
Emanuel Mammana	3	0	2014	2017	
Federico Mancuello	2	1	2015	2015	
Alejandro Mancuso	10	0	1992	1994	1993(AF), 1993
Diego Maradona	91	34	1977	1994	1986, 1993(AF)
Claudio Marangoni	9	0	1983	1984	
Agustín Marchesín	8	0	2011	2021	2021
Alberto Márcico	15	0	1983	1992	
Iván Marcone	1	0	2019	2019	
José Miguel Marín	2	0	1971	1971	
Emiliano Martínez	71	0	2021	2026	2021, 2022(F), 2022, 2024
Jorge Daniel Martínez	3	0	1997	1997	
Juan Manuel Martínez	4	1	2011	2012	
Lautaro Martínez	87	42	2018	2026	2021, 2022(F), 2022, 2024
Lisandro Martínez	40	2	2019	2026	2021, 2022(F), 2022, 2024
Gonzalo Martínez	3	1	2018	2019	
Gerardo Martino	1	0	1991	1991	
Rinaldo Martino	20	15	1942	1948	
Silvio Marzolini	28	1	1960	1969	
Emmanuel Mas	8	0	2015	2017	
Oscar Más	37	10	1965	1972	
Herminio Masantonio	19	21	1935	1942	
Javier Mascherano	147	3	2003	2018	
Humberto Maschio	18	18	1956	1957	
Franco Mastantuono	8	3	2025	2026	
Vicente de la Mata	13	6	1937	1946	
Carlos Matheu	1	0	2010	2010	
Facundo Medina	18	0	2022	2026	
Ramón Medina Bello	17	5	1991	1994	1991, 1993
Nicolás Medina	1	0	2004	2004	
Jesús Méndez	2	0	2009	2009	
Norberto Doroteo Méndez	31	19	1945	1956	
Sebastián Méndez	2	0	1999	1999	
Norberto Menéndez	14	4	1957	1958	
César Luis Menotti	11	2	1963	1968	
Gabriel Mercado	25	4	2010	2019	
Juan Ignacio Mercier	3	0	2010	2010	
Lionel Messi	208	126	2005	2026	2021, 2022(F), 2022, 2024
Maximiliano Meza	11	0	2018	2022	
Rodolfo Micheli	13	10	1953	1956	
Diego Milito	25	4	2003	2011	
Gabriel Milito	42	1	2000	2011	
José María Minella	24	1	1933	1941	
Antonio Mohamed	4	1	1991	1991	1991
Nahuel Molina	65	1	2021	2026	2021, 2022(F), 2022, 2024
Roberto Molina	1	0	1996	1996	
Roberto Monserrat	4	0	1993	1995	
Daniel Montenegro	3	0	2007	2009	
Luis Monti	16	5	1924	1931	
Gonzalo Montiel	47	2	2019	2026	2021, 2022, 2024
Walter Montillo	6	0	2011	2013	
Fabián Monzón	7	0	2009	2011	
Pedro Monzón	15	1	1988	1990	
Diego Morales	1	0	2011	2011	
Hugo Morales	9	2	1996	1997	
Maximiliano Moralez	1	0	2011	2011	
Aníbal Moreno	1	0	2025	2025	
José Manuel Moreno	34	19	1936	1950	
Guillermo Morigi	1	0	1996	1996	
Pablo Mouche	5	2	2011	2011	
Eliseo Mouriño	21	0	1952	1959	
Roberto Mouzo	4	0	1974	1983	
Juan Carlos Muñoz	11	2	1945	1945	
Mateo Musacchio	6	0	2011	2017	
Julio Musimessi	14	0	1953	1958	
Juan Musso	4	0	2019	2026	2021
Ramón Muttis	11	0	1923	1930	
Rubén Marino Navarro	32	0	1960	1963	
José Nehin	1	0	1934	1934	
Lucas Ocampos	12	2	2019	2023	
Marcelo Ojeda	1	0	1997	1997	
Julio Olarticoechea	32	0	1982	1990	1986
Jorge Olguín	60	0	1976	1982	1978
Nicolás Olmedo	1	0	2010	2010	
Daniel Onega	13	0	1966	1972	
Ermindo Onega	30	11	1960	1967	
Saúl Ongaro	2	0	1946	1946	
Lucas Orbán	2	0	2013	2015	
Agustín Orion	3	0	2011	2014	
Ariel Ortega	87	16	1993	2010	
Oscar Ortiz	23	3	1975	1979	1978
Nicolás Otamendi	140	9	2009	2026	2021, 2022(F), 2022, 2024
Miguel Oviedo	9	0	1978	1978	1978
Iselín Santos Ovejero	4	0	1967	1967	
Carlos Pachamé	10	0	1967	1969	
Rubén Pagnanini	4	1	1978	1978	1978
Exequiel Palacios	45	0	2018	2026	2021, 2022(F), 2022, 2024
Tomás Palacios	1	0	2026	2026	
Rodrigo Palacio	27	3	2005	2014	
Martín Palermo	15	9	1999	2010	
Martín Pando	11	3	1960	1962	
Fernando Pandolfi	2	0	1999	1999	
Joaquín Panichelli	1	0	2025	2025	
Emiliano Papa	8	0	2008	2011	
Leandro Paredes	84	5	2017	2026	2021, 2022, 2024
Nicolás Pareja	1	0	2010	2010	
Pedro Pasculli	20	5	1984	1987	1986
Daniel Passarella	70	22	1974	1986	1978, 1986
Oscar Passet	2	0	1996	1996	
Javier Pastore	29	2	2010	2017	
José Omar Pastoriza	18	0	1966	1972	
Fernando Paternoster	16	0	1928	1930	
Cristian Pavón	11	0	2017	2018	
Mariano Pavone	1	0	2007	2007	
Nico Paz	16	6	2024	2026	
Pablo Paz	14	1	1996	1998	
Adolfo Pedernera	21	7	1940	1946	
Mauricio Pellegrino	3	0	1997	1997	
José Alberto Percudani	5	0	1987	1987	
Juan Pablo Pereyra	1	0	2010	2010	
Roberto Pereyra	19	2	2014	2019	
Enzo Pérez	26	1	2008	2018	
Hugo Pérez	14	3	1993	1995	
Nehuén Pérez	3	0	2022	2024	
Pablo Pérez	1	0	2018	2018	
Roberto Perfumo	37	0	1964	1974	
Diego Perotti	5	0	2009	2018	
Máximo Perrone	3	0	2025	2026	
Gino Peruzzi	5	0	2012	2015	
Natalio Pescia	12	0	1946	1954	
Carlos Peucelle	29	12	1928	1940	
Germán Pezzella	42	3	2017	2024	2021, 2022(F), 2022, 2024
Pablo Piatti	1	0	2011	2011	
Osvaldo Piazza	15	0	1972	1977	
Iván Pillud	5	0	2011	2011	
Mauricio Pineda	12	1	1996	1998	
Javier Pinola	2	0	2007	2016	
Guido Pizarro	4	0	2017	2019	
Diego Placente	22	0	2000	2005	
Mauricio Pochettino	20	2	1999	2002	
José Daniel Ponce	21	4	1983	1985	
René Pontoni	19	19	1942	1947	
Leonardo Ponzio	8	0	2003	2013	
Martín Posse	3	0	1997	1997	
Aldo Poy	2	0	1973	1974	
Diego Pozo	3	0	2009	2010	
Lucas Pratto	5	2	2016	2017	
Sebastián Prediger	1	0	2009	2009	
Gianluca Prestianni	5	1	2025	2026	
Nery Pumpido	36	0	1983	1990	1986
Lucas Martínez Quarta	16	0	2019	2026	2021, 2024
Ismael Quílez	2	0	2011	2011	
Facundo Quiroga	16	0	2002	2004	
Sebastián Rambert	8	3	1994	1995	
José Ramos Delgado	25	0	1958	1965	
Víctor Rogelio Ramos	10	1	1983	1985	
Antonio Rattín	34	1	1959	1969	
Franco Razzotti	1	0	2010	2010	
Fernando Redondo	29	1	1992	1999	1992, 1993
Alberto Rendo	18	9	1960	1969	
Emiliano Rigoni	2	0	2017	2017	
Jorge Rinaldi	14	0	1983	1985	
Fabián Rinaudo	4	0	2009	2011	
Juan Román Riquelme	51	17	1997	2008	
Lautaro Rivero	1	0	2025	2025	
Carlos Roa	16	0	1997	1999	
Clemente Rodríguez	20	0	2003	2013	
Gonzalo Rodríguez	7	1	2003	2015	
Guido Rodríguez	30	1	2017	2024	2021, 2022(F), 2022, 2024
Leonardo Rodríguez	28	2	1991	1994	1991, 1992, 1993(AF), 1993
Luis Miguel Rodríguez	1	0	2008	2008	
Maxi Rodríguez	57	16	2003	2014	
Alfredo Rojas	15	1	1958	1966	
Ángel Clemente Rojas	2	1	1965	1968	
Ariel Rojas	3	0	2011	2011	
Gabriel Rojas	1	0	2026	2026	
Marcos Rojo	61	3	2011	2019	
Antonio Roma	42	0	1956	1967	
Leandro Romagnoli	1	0	2003	2003	
Martín Romagnoli	1	0	2005	2005	
Bernardo Romeo	4	1	2000	2003	
Cristian Romero	61	5	2021	2026	2021, 2022(F), 2022, 2024
Sebastián Ariel Romero	1	0	2005	2005	
Sergio Romero	96	0	2009	2018	
Facundo Roncaglia	14	0	2013	2017	
Mauro Rosales	10	1	2004	2004	
Néstor Rossi	26	0	1947	1958	
Oscar Rossi	20	0	1956	1963	
Pablo Rotchen	4	0	1995	1997	
Marco Ruben	1	1	2011	2011	
Oscar Ruggeri	97	7	1983	1994	1986, 1991, 1992, 1993
Geronimo Rulli	10	0	2018	2026	2022(F), 2022, 2024
Miguel Ángel Russo	17	1	1983	1985	
Miguel Ángel Rugilo	4	0	1950	1951	
Francisco Sá	12	0	1973	1974	
Alejandro Sabella	8	0	1983	1984	
Gerónimo Saccardi	2	0	1974	1974	
Federico Sacchi	15	1	1960	1965	
Sebastián Saja	4	0	2002	2003	
Julio Saldaña	3	0	1992	1993	1993(AF)
José Salomón	44	0	1939	1946	
Eduardo Salvio	14	0	2009	2020	
Walter Samuel	56	5	1999	2010	
Jorge San Esteban	1	0	1999	1999	
José Gustavo Sand	2	0	2008	2009	
José Sanfilippo	29	21	1957	1962	
Santiago Santamaría	10	2	1980	1982	
Mario Santana	7	1	2004	2005	
Renzo Saravia	9	0	2018	2019	
Antonio Sastre	34	6	1933	1941	
Javier Saviola	39	11	2000	2007	
Lionel Scaloni	7	0	2003	2006	
Rolando Schiavi	4	0	2009	2009	
Gabriel Schürer	4	0	1995	1995	
Ignacio Scocco	1	2	2012	2012	
Alejandro Scopelli	8	4	1929	1937	
Darío Scotto	1	0	1992	1992	
Marcos Senesi	5	0	2022	2026	
Roberto Sensini	60	0	1987	2000	
José Serrizuela	8	0	1989	1990	
Jonathan Silva	2	0	2014	2014	
Carmelo Simeone	22	0	1959	1966	
Diego Simeone	106	11	1988	2002	1991, 1992, 1993(AF), 1993
Giovanni Simeone	6	1	2018	2023	
Giuliano Simeone	18	3	2024	2026	
Juan Simón	13	0	1980	1990	
Santiago Simón	1	0	2026	2026	
Darío Siviski	6	0	1987	1990	
Omar Sívori	19	9	1956	1957	
Santiago Solari	11	1	1999	2004	
Leandro Somoza	5	0	2005	2013	
Juan Pablo Sorín	76	12	1995	2006	
Carlos Sosa	12	0	1942	1946	
José Sosa	19	1	2005	2013	
Rubén Héctor Sosa	18	11	1959	1962	
Víctor Sotomayor	1	0	1996	1996	
Matías Soulé	2	0	2026	2026	
Mauricio Sperduti	2	0	2011	2011	
Guillermo Stábile	4	8	1930	1930	
Matías Suárez	6	0	2019	2019	
Pedro Arico Suárez	12	1	1930	1940	
Ezra Sued	6	2	1945	1947	
Nicolás Tagliafico	85	1	2017	2026	2021, 2022(F), 2022, 2024
Carlos Daniel Tapia	10	1	1980	1988	1986
Alberto Tarantini	61	1	1974	1982	1978
Hugo Tedesco	1	0	1967	1967	
Roberto Telch	24	2	1964	1974	
Carlos Tevez	76	13	2004	2015	
Patricio Toranzo	2	0	2010	2010	
Marcelo Trobbiani	15	1	1974	1986	1986
Pedro Troglio	21	2	1987	1990	
Mariano Troilo	1	0	2026	2026	
Enzo Trossero	27	0	1977	1985	
Roberto Trotta	3	0	1995	1995	
Eduardo Tuzzio	2	0	2005	2007	
Juan José Urruti	1	0	1983	1983	
Óscar Ustari	2	0	2006	2007	
Federico Vairo	41	1	1955	1958	
Jorge Valdano	23	7	1975	1990	1986
José Daniel Valencia	41	5	1975	1982	1978
Diego Valeri	3	0	2011	2011	
Víctor Valussi	9	0	1940	1942	
José Van Tuyne	11	0	1979	1982	
Leonel Vangioni	3	0	2009	2012	
José Varacka	28	0	1956	1966	
Francisco Varallo	16	7	1930	1937	
Matías Vargas	2	0	2018	2019	
Franco Vázquez	3	0	2018	2018	
Sergio Vázquez	30	0	1991	1994	1991, 1992, 1993(AF), 1993
Román Vega	3	0	2026	2026	
Carlos Veglio	9	0	1968	1970	
Héctor Veira	2	0	1965	1967	
Julián Velázquez	1	0	2011	2011	
Santiago Vergini	3	0	2012	2014	
Juan Ramón Verón	4	0	1968	1971	
Juan Sebastián Verón	73	9	1996	2010	
Lucas Viatri	3	0	2010	2011	
Ricardo Villa	17	1	1975	1978	1978
Cristian Villagra	1	0	2010	2010	
José Luis Villarreal	8	0	1991	1993	1992
Hugo Villaverde	6	0	1979	1979	
Nelson Vivas	39	1	1994	2003	
Aarón Wergifker	4	0	1934	1936	
Daniel Willington	6	1	1968	1970	
Enrique Wolff	27	1	1972	1974	
Claudio Yacob	3	1	2011	2012	
Norberto Yácono	15	0	1944	1951	
Héctor Yazalde	10	2	1970	1974	
Pablo Zabaleta	58	0	2005	2016	
Julio Zamora	3	0	1992	1993	1993
Javier Zanetti	143	4	1994	2011	
Gustavo Zapata	27	0	1991	1998	1991, 1993
Víctor Zapata	2	0	2005	2010	
Matías Zaracho	1	0	2019	2019	
Rolando Zárate	2	1	2005	2005	
Sergio Zárate	1	0	1992	1992	
Alberto Zozaya	9	8	1933	1937	
Franco Zuculini	1	0	2009	2009	
Adolfo Zumelzú	13	3	1927	1930	

== See also ==
- Argentina national football team records and statistics
- List of Argentina national football team managers
- Argentina national football team
