= List of Argentina national football team managers =

The following is a list of every manager of the Argentina national football team.

== List ==
Correct as of 3 October 2026 (vs Burkina Faso)

No.	Tenure	Manager	Pld	W	D	L	GF	GA	GD	Win %	Titles
1	1921	Pedro Calomino (Note: Calomino is cited on AFA website as one of the managers who won Copa América titles. Nevertheless, other sources do not include him as coach.)									1 Copa América (1921)
2	1924–1925	Ángel Vázquez	13	6	6	1	19	9	+10	61.53%	1 Copa América (1925)
3	1927–1928	José Lago Millán	13	8	3	2	44	15	+29	69.23%	1 Copa América (1927); 1 Olympic silver (Ámsterdam 1928) (Note: Counts due to Olympic teams competed with senior squads by then.)
4	1929–1930	Francisco Olazar - Juan José Tramutola	11	7	2	2	29	13	+16	69.69%	1 Copa América (1929); 1930 FIFA World Cup Runner-up
5	1934	Felipe Pascucci	1	0	0	1	2	3	−1	00.00%
6	1934–1937	Manuel Seoane	10	7	1	2	20	8	+12	73.33%	1 Copa América (1937)
7	1938–1939	Ángel Fernández Roca	4	3	0	1	11	6	+5	75.00%
8	1939–1958	Guillermo Stábile	115	77	20	18	290	129	+161	72.75%	6 Copa América (1941, 1945, 1946, 1947, 1955, 1957)
9	1959	Victorio Spinetto – José Barreiro – José Della Torre	6	5	1	0	19	5	+14	91.66%	1 Copa América (1959)
10	1959	José Manuel Moreno	5	2	1	2	11	13	−2	50.00%
11	1960	Guillermo Stábile	10	6	1	3	16	15	+1	63.33%	1 Panamerican Championship (1960)
12	1960–1961	Victorio Spinetto	10	5	3	2	23	12	+11	60.00%
13	1961	José D'Amico	2	1	0	1	6	3	3	50.00%
14	1962	Juan Carlos Lorenzo	5	2	2	1	4	4	0	53.33%
15	1962	Néstor Rossi	1	1	0	0	3	1	2	100.00%
16	1962	Jim Lópes (Note: His real name was Alejandro Galán.)	2	1	1	0	2	1	+1	66.66%
17	1963	Horacio Amable Torres	8	4	1	3	20	17	+3	54.16%
–	1963	José D'Amico	2	1	0	1	6	3	+3	50.00%
18	1964–65	José María Minella	15	9	5	1	31	8	+23	71.11%
19	1965	Osvaldo Zubeldía	1	0	1	0	1	1	0	33.33%
20	1966	Juan Carlos Lorenzo	6	2	2	2	5	6	−1	44.44%
–	1967	Jim Lópes	5	4	0	1	12	3	9	80.00%
21	1967	Carmelo Faraone	2	0	0	2	1	3	−2	00.00%
22	1967–1968	Renato Cesarini	5	1	1	3	5	8	−3	26.66%
–	1968	José María Minella	8	2	3	3	13	13	0	37.50%
23	1969	Humberto Maschio	4	1	3	0	4	3	+1	50.00%
24	1969	Adolfo Pedernera	4	1	1	2	4	6	−2	33.33%
25	1970–1972	Juan José Pizzuti	23	10	8	5	35	28	+7	55.07%
26	1972–1973	Omar Sívori	15	8	4	3	28	18	+10	62.22%
27	1974	Vladislao Cap	10	3	3	4	15	19	−4	40.00%
28	1974–1983	César Menotti	81	43	20	18	156	82	+74	61.31%	1 FIFA World Cup (1978)
29	1983–1990	Carlos Bilardo	83	28	31	24	91	77	+14	46.18%	1 FIFA World Cup (1986); 1990 FIFA World Cup Runner-up
30	1990–1994	Alfio Basile	48	25	17	6	75	44	+31	63.88%	2 Copa América (1991, 1993); 1 FIFA Confederations Cup (1992); 1 CONMEBOL–UEFA Cup of Champions (1993)
31	1994–1998	Daniel Passarella	55	32	13	10	98	42	+56	66.06%	1995 King Fahd Cup Runner-up
32	1999–2004	Marcelo Bielsa	69	43	16	10	127	61	+66	70.05%	2004 Copa América Runner-up
33	2004–2006	José Pékerman	27	14	7	6	50	33	+17	60.49%	2005 FIFA Confederations Cup Runner-up
–	2006–2008	Alfio Basile	28	14	8	6	44	25	+19	59.52%	2007 Copa América Runner-up
34	2008–2010	Diego Maradona	24	18	0	6	47	27	+20	75.00%
35	2010–2011	Sergio Batista	17	8	6	3	30	17	+13	58.82%
36	2011–2014	Alejandro Sabella	41	26	10	5	76	33	+43	71.54%	2014 FIFA World Cup Runner-up
37	2014–2016	Gerardo Martino	29	19	7	3	66	18	+48	73.56%	2015 Copa América Runner-up; Copa América Centenario Runner-up
38	2016–2017	Edgardo Bauza	8	3	2	3	9	10	−1	45.83%
39	2017–2018	Jorge Sampaoli	15	7	4	4	27	21	+6	55.56%
40	2018–	Lionel Scaloni	106	78	18	10	228	57	+171	73.58%	2 Copa América (2021, 2024); 1 CONMEBOL–UEFA Cup of Champions (2022); 1 FIFA World Cup (2022); 2026 FIFA World Cup Runner-up
