= 1991–92 Argentine Primera División =

101st season of top-tier football league in Argentina

Primera División
- Season: 1991–92
- Dates: 10 September 1991 – 5 July 1992
- Champions: Apertura: River Plate (23rd title); Clausura: Newell's Old Boys (4th title)
- 1993 Copa Libertadores: Newell's Old Boys; River Plate
- 1992 Copa CONMEBOL: Boca Juniors; Gimnasia y Esgrima LP; Vélez Sarsfield

The 1991–92 Argentine Primera División was the 101st season of top-flight professional football in Argentina. Starting with this season, both Apertura and Clausura tournaments were recognised as separate championships, and no final decider was played between the winners of each tournament. River Plate won the Apertura and Newell's Old Boys won the Clausura.

The season ran from 10 September 1991 to 5 July 1992, with Quilmes and Unión de Santa Fe being relegated.

== Competition format ==
The tournament for the 1991–92 season was composed of 20 teams. Each team played each other in a single round-robin tournament. The season was divided in two separate championships, called Apertura (Opening) and Clausura (Closing). If each tournament was won by a different team, they played a two-legged qualifier for the 1993 Copa Libertadores. To decide the remaining berth for the Copa Libertadores, the four runners-up from the Apertura tournaments and the four runners-up from the Clausura tournament (not already qualified in the Apertura tournament) competed in an eight-team knockout round. The winning team played against the losing team from the two-legged qualifier and was granted a berth in the 1993 Copa Libertadores. The losing team plus the finalist and best semi-finalist of the eight-team knockout round competed in the 1992 Copa CONMEBOL. Relegation occurred at the end of the Clausura stage, with the two teams with the worst three-year point average (Primera División competition only) being relegated to Primera B Nacional competition.

== Apertura Tournament ==
Apertura
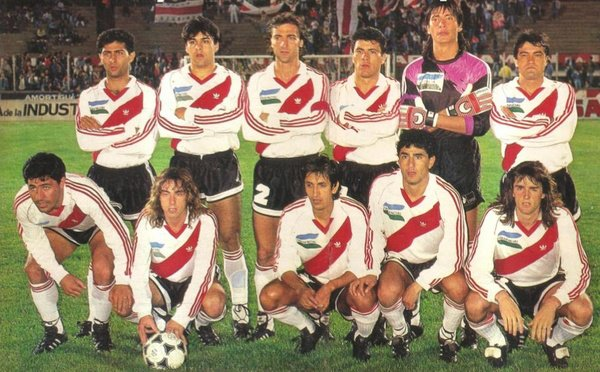
- River Plate, Apertura champions
- Season: 1991
- Dates: 29 August – 22 December
- Champions: River Plate
- Promoted: Quilmes; Belgrano (C)
- Top goalscorer: Ramón Díaz (14 goals)
- Biggest home win: Vélez Sarsfield 5–0 Huracán (28 Sep)
- Biggest away win: Independiente 0-3 Newell's (28 Nov)
- Highest scoring: Argentinos Juniors 5–2 Dep. Español (28 Nov. 1991)

The Apertura Tournament began on 29 August 1991 and finished on 22 December 1991. River Plate won the tournament. The match between River Plate and Racing was suspended, with the victory being awarded later to River Plate.

Pos	Team	Pld	W	D	L	GF	GA	GD	Pts	Qualification
1	River Plate	19	13	4	2	32	11	+21	30	Qualified to 1993 Copa Libertadores qualifier final
2	Boca Juniors	19	7	10	2	22	15	+7	24	Qualified to 1993 Copa Libertadores qualifier
3	San Lorenzo	19	4	14	1	20	14	+6	22	Qualified to 1993 Copa Libertadores qualifier
4	Vélez Sarsfield	19	8	5	6	27	18	+9	21	Qualified to 1993 Copa Libertadores qualifier
5	Gimnasia y Esgrima (LP)	19	7	7	5	16	17	−1	21	Qualified to 1993 Copa Libertadores qualifier
6	Deportivo Mandiyú	19	7	6	6	22	20	+2	20	
7	Platense	19	5	10	4	16	14	+2	20	
8	Talleres (C)	19	7	6	6	19	21	−2	20	
9	Argentinos Juniors	19	4	11	4	18	18	0	19	
10	Ferro Carril Oeste	19	6	7	6	16	16	0	19	
11	Independiente	19	6	7	6	20	21	−1	19	
12	Huracán	19	5	9	5	18	21	−3	19	
13	Racing	19	4	11	4	14	13	+1	19	
14	Deportivo Español	19	6	6	7	23	25	−2	18	
15	Belgrano	19	3	11	5	15	17	−2	17	
16	Rosario Central	19	4	9	6	17	21	−4	17	
17	Estudiantes (LP)	19	4	8	7	14	21	−7	16	
18	Newell's Old Boys	19	3	9	7	14	16	−2	15	
19	Unión	19	3	8	8	13	21	−8	14	
20	Quilmes	19	1	8	10	9	25	−16	10	

Source: Argentina 1991/92, Pablo Ciullini at Rec.Sport.Soccer Statistics Foundation.

== Clausura Tournament ==
Clausura
- Season: 1992
- Dates: 21 February – 5 July
- Champions: Newell's Old Boys
- Relegated: Quilmes; Unión
- Top goalscorer: Diego Latorre; Darío Scotto (9 goals each)
- Biggest home win: Platense 5–0 R. Central (19 Apr)
- Biggest away win: River Plate 0–5 Newell's (10 May)
- Highest scoring: Estudiantes (LP) 5-1 Quilmes (8 Mar)

The Clausura Tournament began on 21 February 1992 and finished on 5 July 1992. Newell's Old Boys won their fourth title. Quilmes was deducted two points following incidents in their match against Ferro Carril Oeste.

Pos	Team	Pld	W	D	L	GF	GA	GD	Pts	Qualification
1	Newell's Old Boys	19	11	7	1	27	18	+9	29	Qualified to 1993 Copa Libertadores qualifier final
2	Vélez Sarsfield	19	10	7	2	29	16	+13	27	
3	Deportivo Español	19	9	9	1	24	11	+13	27	Qualified to 1993 Copa Libertadores qualifier
4	Boca Juniors	19	10	6	3	20	11	+9	26	
5	River Plate	19	8	8	3	31	22	+9	24	
6	Platense	19	8	6	5	23	16	+7	22	Qualified to 1993 Copa Libertadores qualifier
7	Racing	19	5	11	3	12	9	+3	21	Qualified to 1993 Copa Libertadores qualifier
8	Gimnasia y Esgrima (LP)	19	6	8	5	25	20	+5	20	
9	Huracán	19	5	9	5	18	19	−1	19	Qualified to 1993 Copa Libertadores qualifier
10	Belgrano	19	6	6	7	18	18	0	18	
11	Ferro Carril Oeste	19	5	8	6	13	14	−1	18	
12	Independiente	19	4	9	6	16	16	0	17	
13	Talleres (C)	19	4	9	6	14	17	−3	17	
14	Rosario Central	19	8	1	10	19	24	−5	17	
15	Argentinos Juniors	19	5	6	8	16	19	−3	16	
16	Unión	19	2	9	8	11	18	−7	13	
17	Estudiantes (LP)	19	2	9	8	14	26	−12	13	
18	Deportivo Mandiyú	19	3	7	9	16	30	−14	13	
19	San Lorenzo	19	3	6	10	11	25	−14	12	
20	Quilmes	19	4	3	12	14	32	−18	11	

Source: Argentina 1991/92, Pablo Ciullini at Rec.Sport.Soccer Statistics Foundation.

== Copa Libertadores qualification ==
Champions of the Apertura tournament River Plate faced Clausura champions Newell's Old Boys for a spot in the 1993 Copa Libertadores. The losing team would play against the winner of the eight-team knockout round for the remaining berth. River Plate won two of the three matches and qualified for the Copa Libertadores.

12 July 1992

Newell's Old Boys	0–0	River Plate

Estadio Gigante de Arroyito, Rosario
Referee: Juan C. Crespi

19 July 1992

River Plate	1–0	Newell's Old Boys
Medina Bello 88'

Estadio Monumental, Buenos Aires
Referee: Francisco Lamolina

26 July 1992

River Plate	3–2	Newell's Old Boys
Medina Bello 23', 48'; Díaz 32'		Martino 27'; Lunari 43'

Estadio Olímpico de Córdoba, Córdoba
Referee: Juan C. Loustau

Team details

River Plate
Newell's O.B.

GK	1	(Argentina) José Miguel
DF	4	(Argentina) Fabián Basualdo
DF	2	(Argentina) Fernando Cáceres
DF	6	(Argentina) Guillermo Rivarola
DF	3	(Argentina) Diego Cocca
MF	8	(Argentina) Gustavo Zapata
MF	5	(Argentina) Leonardo Astrada
MF	10	(Argentina) Julio Toresani
MF	11	(Argentina) Hernán Díaz
FW	7	(Argentina) Ramón Medina Bello	(substituted off) 83'
FW	9	(Argentina) Ramón Díaz	(substituted off) 65'
Substitutes:
FW	16	(Argentina) Walter Silvani	(substituted on) 65'
MF	13	(Argentina) Javier Claut	(substituted on) 83'
Manager:
(Argentina) Daniel Passarella

GK	1	(Argentina) Norberto Scoponi
DF	4	(Argentina) Julio Saldaña	(substituted off) 12'
DF	2	(Argentina) Fernando Gamboa
DF	6	(Argentina) Mauricio Pochettino
DF	3	(Argentina) Eduardo Berizzo
MF	10	(Argentina) Alfredo Berti
MF	5	(Argentina) Juan Manuel Llop
MF	8	(Argentina) Gerardo Martino
FW	7	(Argentina) Julio Zamora
FW	9	(Argentina) Cristian Domizzi	(substituted on) 71'
FW	11	(Argentina) Ricardo Lunari
Substitutes:
DF	13	(Argentina) Gustavo Raggio	(substituted on) 12'
FW	16	(Argentina) Aldo Soria	(substituted on) 71'
Manager:
(Argentina) Carlos Picerni

== Torneo Octogonal ==
The second qualifying instance to the 1993 Copa Libertadores began on 10 July 1992 and finished on 26 July 1992. Eight teams competed in a direct elimination knockout tournament with home and away matches, where the winning team faced the losing team from the first qualifier. The losing team from this qualifier plus the two best teams from the knockout phase qualified for the 1992 Copa CONMEBOL.

Quarter-finals
July 12 - El Palacio
Boca Juniors	2
San Lorenzo	0
July 12 - El Doble Visera
Platense	0
Gimnasia y Esgrima (LP)	1
July 12 - Ricardo Etcheverry
Vélez Sarsfield	1
Huracán	0
July 10 - El Palacio
Deportivo Español	1
Racing	0

Semi-finals
July 18 - José Amalfitani
Boca Juniors	0
Gimnasia y Esgrima (LP)	1
July 19 - Ricardo Etcheverry
Vélez Sarsfield	1 (4)
Deportivo Español	1 (2)

Final
July 26 - Monumental
Vélez Sarsfield	3
Gimnasia y Esgrima (LP)	0

== Second place match ==
Vélez Sarsfield played a final playoff match against Newell's Old Boys for the remaining berth in the 1993 Copa Libertadores.

2 August 1992

Newell's Old Boys	1–0	Vélez Sarsfield
Saldaña 80'

Gigante de Arroyito, Rosario
Referee: Juan Bava

Team details

Newell's O.B.
Vélez Sarsfield

GK	1	(Argentina) Norberto Scoponi
DF	4	(Argentina) Julio Saldaña
DF	2	(Argentina) Fernando Gamboa
DF	6	(Argentina) Mauricio Pochettino
DF	3	(Argentina) Eduardo Berizzo
MF	11	(Argentina) Alfredo Berti
MF	5	(Argentina) Juan Manuel Llop
MF	8	(Argentina) Gerardo Martino
MF	10	(Argentina) Juan J. Rossi	(substituted on) 76'
FW	7	(Argentina) Julio Zamora
FW	9	(Argentina) Ricardo Lunari	(substituted on) 89'
Substitutes:
FW	16	(Argentina) Cristian Domizzi	(substituted on) 76'
DF	14	(Argentina) Fabián Garfagnoli	(substituted on) 89'
Manager:
(Argentina) Carlos Picerni

GK	1	(Paraguay) José Luis Chilavert
DF	4	(Argentina) Horacio Bidevich
DF	2	(Argentina) José Almandoz
DF	6	(Argentina) Roberto Trotta
DF	3	(Argentina) Raúl Cardozo
MF	8	(Argentina) Carlos Compagnucci	(substituted off) 87'
MF	5	(Argentina) Alejandro Mancuso
MF	7	(Argentina) Christian Bassedas
MF	10	(Argentina) Norberto Ortega Sánchez
FW	9	(Argentina) Ricardo Gareca
FW	11	(Argentina) José O. Flores
Substitutes:
		(Argentina) Campos	(substituted on) 87'
Manager:
(Argentina) Eduardo Luján Manera

== Relegation ==
At the end of the season Quilmes and Unión were relegated after finishing with the two worst points averages.

Team	Average	Points	Played	1989–90	1990–91	1991–92
River Plate	1.342	153	114	53	45	55
Boca Juniors	1.263	144	114	43	51	50
Vélez Sársfield	1.184	135	114	42	45	48
Newell's Old Boys	1.123	128	114	36	48	44
Independiente	1.070	122	114	46	40	36
Racing	1.035	118	114	39	40	39
Huracán	1.026	78	76	N/A	40	38
Rosario Central	1.018	116	114	43	39	34
Ferro Carril Oeste	1.000	114	114	39	38	37
San Lorenzo	1.000	114	114	35	45	34
Gimnasia y Esgrima (LP)	0.991	113	114	39	33	41
Platense	0.991	113	114	36	35	42
Argentinos Juniors	0.956	109	114	38	36	35
Deportivo Mandiyú	0.939	107	114	36	38	33
Belgrano	0.921	35	38	N/A	N/A	35
Deportivo Español	0.912	104	114	31	28	45
Estudiantes (LP)	0.895	102	114	34	39	29
Talleres (C)	0.895	102	114	36	29	37
Unión	0.825	94	114	36	31	27
Quilmes	0.500	19	38	N/A	N/A	19

== See also ==
- 1991–92 in Argentine football
