= 2026 Finalissima =

- Event: Finalissima
Spain	Argentina
- Date: 27 March 2026 (cancelled)
- Venue: Lusail Stadium, Lusail, Qatar

The 2026 Finalissima (Italian: Grand Final; Spanish: Finalísima) was planned to be the fourth edition of the intercontinental football match between the winners of the previous South American and European championships, and the second edition rebranded as Finalissima. The match would have featured Spain, winners of UEFA Euro 2024, and Argentina, winners of the 2024 Copa América. It was scheduled to be played on 27 March 2026, at Lusail Stadium in Lusail, Qatar. Argentina were the defending champions.

On 15 March, UEFA announced the cancellation of the match due to the security situation in Qatar as a result of American and Israeli attacks in Iran, leading to a war, and the inability to reach an agreement to move the match to another location. The two teams met nearly four months later in the 2026 FIFA World Cup final, in which Spain won their second World Cup against Argentina.

== Background ==
Initially expected to take place between June and July 2025, the match was left without a definite date for some time because both teams already had competitions scheduled during the 2025 FIFA International match Calendar, with Spain competing in the 2024–25 UEFA Nations League and then in the 2026 World Cup qualifiers, and Argentina immersed in the lengthy South American World Cup qualifiers. The match was finally scheduled for March 2026 following a meeting between the Royal Spanish Football Federation (RFEF), the Argentine Football Association (AFA), and representatives from UEFA and CONMEBOL in May 2025, and later confirmed by CONMEBOL when it published its competition calendar for 2026. The match was conditional on Spain securing direct qualification for the 2026 FIFA World Cup without having to go through the UEFA play-offs also scheduled for the FIFA window in March 2026.

== Venue ==
Once the match was agreed upon, reports indicated several cities as possible hosts for the game, including Miami (United States), Montevideo (Uruguay), London (England), Riyadh (Saudi Arabia) and Lusail (Qatar). The date and venue for the 2026 Finalissima were officially confirmed by UEFA and CONMEBOL on 18 December 2025, with Lusail Stadium in Lusail, Qatar, set to host the match on 27 March 2026. The announcement was made after Spain won their qualifying group for the 2026 FIFA World Cup in November 2025, thus securing their direct qualification for the 2026 World Cup and becoming available to face Argentina in March 2026. The Finalissima was set to be one of six football matches part of an event named "Qatar Football Festival".

== Cancellation ==
Following American and Israeli missile attacks in Iran on 28 February 2026, Qatar decided to suspend all sporting activities, including the Qatar Stars League, the top-level football league in Qatar. This left the Finalissima in doubt. On 12 March, when the Qatar Stars League was set to resume, Diario AS reported that UEFA and the RFEF proposed the Bernabéu in Madrid to replace Lusail as host, while CONMEBOL and the AFA proposed the Estadio Monumental in Buenos Aires as the replacement. On 15 March 2026, the Finalissima was cancelled after both sides could not come to an agreement as to which stadium would host the game.

Despite this, the teams ultimately met in the 2026 FIFA World Cup final which took place at the MetLife Stadium in East Rutherford, New Jersey (near New York City) in the United States on 19 July 2026, resulting in Spain's victory.

== Teams ==
Team	Confederation	Qualification	Previous participations (bold indicates winners)	FIFA Ranking January 2026
Spain	UEFA	Winners of UEFA Euro 2024	None	1
Argentina^{TH}	CONMEBOL	Winners of the 2024 Copa América	2 (**1993**, **2022**)	2
