= Sergio Vázquez =

Argentine footballer and manager

Personal information
- Full name: Sergio Fabián Vázquez
- Date of birth: 23 November 1965 (age 60)
- Place of birth: Buenos Aires, Argentina
- Height: 1.83 m (6 ft 0 in)
- Position: Defender

Senior career*
Years	Team	Apps	(Gls)
1985–1991	Ferro Carril Oeste	161	(4)
1992	Racing Club	9	(0)
1992	Rosario Central	17	(2)
1993–1996	Universidad Católica	57	(4)
1996	Banfield	6	(0)
1997	Avispa Fukuoka	20	(0)
Total		270	(10)

International career
1991–1994	Argentina	30	(0)
Medal record
Men's football
Representing Argentina
Copa América
Winner	1991 Chile
Winner	1993 Ecuador
FIFA Confederations Cup
Winner	1992 Saudi Arabia
CONMEBOL–UEFA Cup of Champions
Winner	1993 Argentina
- * Club domestic league appearances and goals

Sergio Fabián Vázquez (born 23 November 1965 in Buenos Aires) is a retired Argentine footballer and a current football manager

== Playing career ==
Vázquez played as a defender for a selection of club teams in Argentina and Chile.

He began his career at Ferro Carril Oeste in 1985, he left the club in 1991 and had short spells playing for Racing Club and Rosario Central before moving to Universidad Católica in Chile. In 1996, he returned to Argentina to play a single season for Banfield and in 1997 he moved to Avispa Fukuoka in the J1 League before he retired from playing.

Vázquez was selected for the Argentina squad for the 1994 FIFA World Cup.

== Managerial career ==
In 2005 Vázquez became manager of 4th division club Villa Dálmine but his reign at the club lasted less than a year.

On 16 December 2006, Vázquez was announced as the new manager of 3rd division side Club Deportivo Armenio but his reign as manager didn't last long as he was replaced only five games into the Clausura 2007 season.

== Personal life ==
He is nicknamed Charly due to his resemblance to the well-known Argentine musician Charly García.

== Career statistics ==
=== Club ===
Club performance			League		Cup		League Cup		Total	
Season	Club	League	Apps	Goals	Apps	Goals	Apps	Goals	Apps	Goals
Japan			League		Emperor's Cup		J.League Cup		Total	
1997	Avispa Fukuoka	J1 League	20	0	0	0	6	0	26	0
Total			20	0	0	0	6	0	26	0

=== International ===
Argentina national team
Year	Apps	Goals
1991	11	0
1992	7	0
1993	7	0
1994	5	0
Total	30	0

== Honours ==
=== Club ===
- Universidad Católica
- Copa Libertadores runner-up: 1993
- Chilean Primera División runner-up: 1994, 1995, 1996
- Copa Interamericana: 1994
- Copa Chile: 1995

=== International ===
- Argentina
- Copa América: 1991,1993
- FIFA Confederations Cup: 1992
- CONMEBOL–UEFA Cup of Champions: 1993
