= List of Argentina international footballers born outside Argentina =

This is a list of football players who have represented the Argentina national football team in international football since 1901 and were born outside Argentina.

== List of Players ==
The following players:

1. have played at least one game for the full (senior male) Argentine national team since 1901; and
2. were born outside Argentina.

This list includes players who have dual citizenship with Argentina and/or have become naturalised Argentine citizens. The players are ordered per modern-day country of birth.

List of players
| Country of birth | Player | Caps | Goals | Period |
|---|---|---|---|---|
| Australia (then United Kingdom) | Andrés Mack | 1 | 0 | 1901 |
| England | Robert Sidney Buck | 1 | 0 | 1912 |
| England | Harold James "Héctor" Henman | 1 | 0 | 1906 |
| England | Robert Peel Yates | 4 | 0 | 1911 |
| France | Gonzalo Higuaín | 75 | 31 | 2009–2018 |
| Germany | Marius Hiller | 2 | 4 | 1916 |
| Great Britain | Cándido Hugo McCoubrey | 1 | 0 | 1924 |
| Brazil | Aarón Wergifker | 4 | 0 | 1934–1936 |
| Italy | Mario Busso | 5 | 0 | 1918–1919 |
| Italy | Renato Cesarini | 2 | 1 | 1926 |
| Italy | Miguel Ginevra | 1 | 0 | 1917 |
| Italy | Carlos Nóbile | 3 | 0 | 1923–1925 |
| Italy | Giuliano Simeone | 16 | 2 | 2024– |
| Paraguay | Delfín Benítez Cáceres | 1 | 1 | 1934 |
| Paraguay | Heriberto Correa Chaparro | 4 | 0 | 1973 |
| Paraguay | Constantino Urbieta Sosa | 1 | 0 | 1934 |
| Peru | Colin Campbell | 1 | 0 | 1907 |
| Spain | Manuel De Saa | 2 | 0 | 1935 |
| Spain | Pedro Gallardo | 2 | 0 | 1914 |
| Spain | Alejandro Garnacho | 8 | 0 | 2023– |
| Spain | Nicolás "Nico" Paz | 11 | 1 | 2024– |
| Spain | Pedro "Arico" Suárez | 12 | 1 | 1930–1940 |
| Ukraine (then Soviet Union) | Vladimiro Tarnawsky | 1 | 0 | 1959 |
| Uruguay | Ángel Romano | ? | ? | 1913–1914 |
| Uruguay | Horacio Vignoles | 1 | 0 | 1913 |

== See also ==
- List of Argentina international footballers
