= Johnny Mølby =

Danish football manager (born 1969)

Personal information
- Full name: Johnny Mølby
- Date of birth: 4 February 1969 (age 57)
- Place of birth: Kolding, Denmark
- Height: 1.76 m (5 ft 9 in)
- Position: Midfielder

Team information
- Current team: Al Ahly (assistant)

Youth career
- Kolding IF
- Vejle

Senior career*
Years	Team	Apps	(Gls)
1987–1992	Vejle	194	(24)
1992	Nantes	11	(0)
1992–1993	Borussia Mönchengladbach	16	(0)
1994–1996	Mechelen	44	(2)
1996–1997	AaB	30	(1)
1997–2000	AGF	63	(7)
Total		382	(34)

International career
1987	Denmark U17	6	(3)
1988	Denmark U19	5	(1)
1988	Denmark U21	17	(0)
1989–1993	Denmark	16	(0)

Managerial career
- 2003–2008: Kolding FC
- 2009–2014: Horsens
- 2015–2017: Viborg
- 2019–2020: Vendsyssel
- 2023–2025: Hedensted IF
- 2025: Vejle (interim)
Medal record
Men's football
Representing Denmark
UEFA European Championship
Winner	1992 Sweden
CONMEBOL–UEFA Cup of Champions
Runner-up	1993 Argentina
- * Club domestic league appearances and goals

Johnny Mølby (born 4 February 1969) is a Danish professional football manager and former player and current assistant coach of Egyptian club Al Ahly SC.

He played 16 matches for the Denmark national football team, and was a part of the team which won the Euro 1992, even though he did not play a single match at the tournament. He is a cousin of former Liverpool F.C. player Jan Mølby.

Through his career he represented a number of clubs, including Danish teams Vejle BK, Aalborg BK and AGF Aarhus, FC Nantes in France and Borussia Mönchengladbach in Germany. Following his retirement, Mølby became manager of Kolding FC after he had completed the Danish FA's Elite Coach education and obtained a DBU and UEFA A-License.

He was named the Danish U21-Talent of the Year in 1987.

== Honours ==
Denmark

- UEFA European Football Championship: 1992
