= Néstor Craviotto =

Argentine footballer and manager

Personal information
- Full name: Néstor Oscar Craviotto
- Date of birth: 3 October 1963 (age 63)
- Place of birth: La Plata, Argentina
- Position: Defender

Team information
- Current team: Real Cartagena (manager)

Senior career*
Years	Team	Apps	(Gls)
1983–1991	Estudiantes	146	(12)
1991–1995	Independiente	139	(14)
1995–1996	Estudiantes	28	(4)
1996–1999	Banfield	68	(6)
1999–2000	San Martín SJ	3	(0)
Total		384	(36)

International career
1989–1993	Argentina	11	(2)

Managerial career
- 2000: San Martín SJ
- 2000–2002: Estudiantes
- 2002–2003: Unión Santa Fe
- 2003: Chacarita Juniors
- 2004: Emelec
- 2005: Belgrano
- 2005–2006: Unión Santa Fe
- 2006–2007: Centenario (director)
- 2008: Guatemala U20
- 2009: San Martín SJ
- 2009–2010: Santiago Wanderers (assistant)
- 2010–2011: The Strongest
- 2012: Sportivo Belgrano
- 2013–2014: Unión La Calera
- 2014–2015: The Strongest
- 2016: Deportivo Pereira
- 2017–2018: Atlético Huila
- 2019–2020: Deportivo Pereira
- 2021–2022: Atlético Bucaramanga
- 2022–2023: Atlético Huila
- 2024: Unión Comercio
- 2024: Jaguares de Córdoba
- 2025: Real Cartagena
Medal record
Men's football
Representing Argentina
Copa América
Winner	1991 Chile
Winner	1993 Ecuador
FIFA Confederations Cup
Winner	1992 Saudi Arabia
CONMEBOL–UEFA Cup of Champions
Winner	1993 Argentina
- * Club domestic league appearances and goals

Néstor Oscar Craviotto (born 3 October 1963 in La Plata) is an Argentine football manager and former player who played as a defender. He is the current manager of Colombian club Real Cartagena.

== Playing career ==
He played club football for a number of teams in Argentina and represented his country on 11 occasions.

Craviotto started his professional playing career in 1983 with Estudiantes he was part of the squad that won the Nacional championship that year.

In 1989 Craviotto received his first call-up to the Argentina national team, but he missed out on selection for the 1990 World Cup.

In 1991, he joined Club Atlético Independiente and made his return to the international scene, he was part of two Copa América winning squads, in 1991 and 1993.

Craviotto won his second league championship with Independiente in the 1994 Clausura, Independiente went on to win the Supercopa Sudamericana in 1994 and 1995 and also claimed the 1995 Recopa Sudamericana.

After these successes Craviotto returned to Estudiantes in 1995, he left one year later to join Club Atlético Banfield where he spent three years.

In 1999 Craviotto joined his last team, San Martín de San Juan who were playing in the Argentine 2nd division at the time.

== Managerial career ==
Craviotto started his managerial career shortly after retiring as a player, he then returned to Estudiantes de La Plata where he worked until 2002.

Craviotta was manager of Unión de Santa Fe between 2002 and 2003 and Chacarita Juniors in 2003.

In 2004, he took over at Ecuadorian club Emelec but left after only seven games in charge.

Craviotto returned to Argentine football where he took over 2nd division Club Atlético Belgrano in 2005 and then had a second spell with Unión de Santa Fe. In 2006, he took over at Club Atlético Centenario in Neuquén who were playing in the regionalised 4th division but things did not go well for the club, who were relegated at the end of the 2006–2007 season.

== Honours ==
=== Player ===
==== Club ====
Estudiantes

- Primera División Argentina: Nacional 1983

Independiente

- Primera División Argentina: Clausura 1994
- Supercopa Sudamericana: 1994, 1995
- Recopa Sudamericana: 1995

==== International ====
Argentina

- Copa América: 1991, 1993
- FIFA Confederations Cup: 1992
- CONMEBOL–UEFA Cup of Champions: 1993
