= Oscar Passet =

Argentine footballer

Personal information
- Full name: Oscar Fernando Passet
- Date of birth: 12 October 1965 (age 61)
- Place of birth: Santa Fe, Argentina
- Height: 1.87 m (6 ft 2 in)
- Position: Goalkeeper

Senior career*
Years	Team	Apps	(Gls)
1982–1988	Unión	69	(?)
1988–1992	River Plate	29	(?)
1992–1999	San Lorenzo	217	(?)
1999–2000	Unión	36	(?)
2000–2001	Independiente	11	(?)
2002–2003	Newell's Old Boys	22	(-21)

International career
1995–1996	Argentina	2	(-1)
- * Club domestic league appearances and goals

Oscar Passet (born 12 October 1965) is a former Argentine footballer who played as goalkeeper.

== Honours ==
=== Club ===
River Plate

- Argentine Primera División: 1989–90, 1991–92

San Lorenzo

- Argentine Primera División: 1995 Clausura
