= Julio Saldaña =

Argentine footballer

Personal information
- Full name: Julio Cesar Saldaña
- Date of birth: 14 November 1967 (age 58)
- Place of birth: Arrecifes, Argentina
- Height: 1.78 m (5 ft 10 in)
- Position: Midfielder

Senior career*
Years	Team	Apps	(Gls)
1989–1993	Newell's Old Boys	118	(5)
1993–1996	Boca Juniors	49	(2)
1996–2002	Newell's Old Boys	150	(22)

International career
1992–1993	Argentina	3	(0)
Medal record
Men's football
Representing Argentina
CONMEBOL–UEFA Cup of Champions
Winner	1993 Argentina
- * Club domestic league appearances and goals

Julio Cesar Saldaña (born 14 November 1967 in Arrecifes) is a former Argentine footballer who played as a midfielder.

During his club career in Argentina he played for Newell's Old Boys and Boca Juniors. He also played 3 games for the Argentina national football team between 1992 and 1993.

== Honours ==
=== Club ===
Newell's Old Boys

- Argentine Primera División: 1990–91, 1992 Clausura

=== International ===
Argentina

- Artemio Franchi Trophy: 1993
