= Leonardo Rodríguez =

Argentine footballer

Personal information
- Full name: Leonardo Adrian Rodríguez Iacobitti
- Date of birth: 27 August 1966 (age 60)
- Place of birth: Lanús, Argentina
- Height: 1.80 m (5 ft 11 in)
- Position: Midfielder

Youth career
- Lanús

Senior career*
| Years | Team | Apps | (Gls) |
| 1983–1988 | Lanús | 92 | (17) |
| 1988–1989 | Vélez Sársfield | 29 | (4) |
| 1989–1990 | Argentinos Juniors | 26 | (3) |
| 1990–1991 | San Lorenzo | 27 | (6) |
| 1991–1992 | Toulon | 27 | (12) |
| 1992–1993 | Atalanta | 30 | (2) |
| 1994 | Borussia Dortmund | 7 | (0) |
| 1995–1996 | Universidad de Chile | 55 | (16) |
| 1997–1998 | Club América | 58 | (6) |
| 1998–2001 | Universidad de Chile | 83 | (20) |
| 2001–2002 | San Lorenzo | 40 | (8) |
| 2002 | Lanús | 11 | (2) |
| Total | | 485 | (96) |

International career
| 1991–1994 | Argentina | 28 | (2) |
Medal record
Men's football
Representing Argentina
Copa América
| Winner | 1991 Chile |
| Winner | 1993 Ecuador |
FIFA Confederations Cup
| Winner | 1992 Saudi Arabia |
CONMEBOL–UEFA Cup of Champions
| Winner | 1993 Argentina |
- * Club domestic league appearances and goals

Leonardo ("Leo") Adrián Rodríguez Iacobitti (born 27 August 1966) is an Argentine former professional football midfielder. He played for nine different club sides in his career, and represented the Argentina national team between 1991 and 1994.

== Club career ==
Rodríguez was born in the city of Lanús in the Buenos Aires Province of Argentina. He started his career at Club Atlético Lanús in the Argentine 2nd Division in 1983 and finished his career in 2002 at the same club.

In between this, he had two spells with San Lorenzo and Universidad de Chile as well as playing for Vélez Sársfield and Argentinos Juniors in Argentina, Toulon in France, Atalanta B.C. in Italy and Club América in Mexico and he also had a spell with Borussia Dortmund in Germany.

== International career ==
Rodríguez played for the Argentina national team between 1991 and 1994. He helped La Selección to win the Copa América in 1991 and 1993 and he was part of the 1994 FIFA World Cup squad. He also helped Argentina win the 1992 Confederations Cup, in which he scored in the final itself, and also won the 1993 Artemio Franchi Cup with the albicelestes.

== Personal life ==
His son, Thomas, is a professional footballer.

== Career statistics ==
Argentina score listed first, score column indicates score after each Rodríguez goal.

| No. | Date | Venue | Opponent | Score | Result | Competition |
|---|---|---|---|---|---|---|
| 1 | 20 October 1992 | King Fahd II Stadium, Riyadh, Saudi Arabia | Saudi Arabia | 1–0 | 3–1 | 1992 King Fahd Cup Final |
| 2 | 27 June 1993 | Estadio Monumental, Guayaquil, Ecuador | Brazil | 1–1 | 1–1 | 1993 Copa América |

== Honours ==
Universidad de Chile

- Primera División de Chile: 1995, 1999, 2000
- Copa Chile: 1998, 2000

San Lorenzo

- Copa Mercosur: 2001
- Copa Sudamericana: 2002

Argentina

- Copa América: 1991, 1993
- FIFA Confederations Cup: 1992
- CONMEBOL–UEFA Cup of Champions: 1993
