= Ricardo Altamirano =

Argentine footballer (born 1965)

Personal information
- Full name: Ricardo Daniel Altamirano
- Date of birth: 12 December 1965 (age 60)
- Place of birth: Laguna Paiva, Argentina
- Position: Defender

Youth career
- 1982–1986: Unión de Santa Fe

Senior career*
Years	Team	Apps	(Gls)
1986–1988	Unión de Santa Fe	63	(0)
1988–1992	Independiente	102	(0)
1992–1997	River Plate	123	(4)
1997–1998	Unión de Santa Fe	31	(1)

International career
1991–1995	Argentina	27	(1)
Medal record
Men's football
Representing Argentina
Copa América
Winner	1993 Ecuador
FIFA Confederations Cup
Winner	1992 Saudi Arabia
CONMEBOL–UEFA Cup of Champions
Winner	1993 Argentina
- * Club domestic league appearances and goals as of 15 April 2008

Ricardo Daniel Altamirano (born 12 December 1965) is a former Argentina international footballer who played as a defender.

Altamirano signed as a youth player in 1982 at Unión de Santa Fe, he made his breakthrough into the first team in 1986, but left the club shortly after their relegation from the Argentine Primera in 1988.

Altamirano joined Club Atlético Independiente in 1988, he was part of the squad that won the 1988–89 championship.

Altamirano received his first call-up to the Argentina national team in 1991. He played in three Copa Américas, he was part of the winning squad in 1991 and 1993 and part of the team that were eliminated in the Quarter finals by Brazil in 1995. Altamirano also represented Argentina in the FIFA Confederations Cup in 1992 won by Argentina.

In 1992 Altamirano joined River Plate where he went on to another six major titles, 4 league titles, the Copa Libertadores 1996 and the Supercopa Sudamericana 1997.

Scores and results list Argentina's goal tally first, score column indicates score after each Altamirano goal.

List of international goals scored by Ricardo Altamirano
No.	Date	Venue	Opponent	Score	Result	Competition	Ref.
1	16 October 1992	King Fahd International Stadium, Riyadh, Saudi Arabia	Ivory Coast	3–0	4–0	1992 King Fahd Cup	

== Honours ==
=== Club ===
Independiente

- Primera División Argentina: 1988–89

River Plate

- Primera División Argentina: Apertura 1993, Apertura 1994, Clausura 1997
- Copa Libertadores: 1996
- Primera División Argentina: Apertura 1996
- Supercopa Sudamericana: 1997

=== International ===
Argentina

- Copa América: 1991, 1993
- FIFA Confederations Cup: 1992
- Artemio Franchi Trophy: 1993
