= Alfio Basile =

Argentine footballer and manager (born 1943)

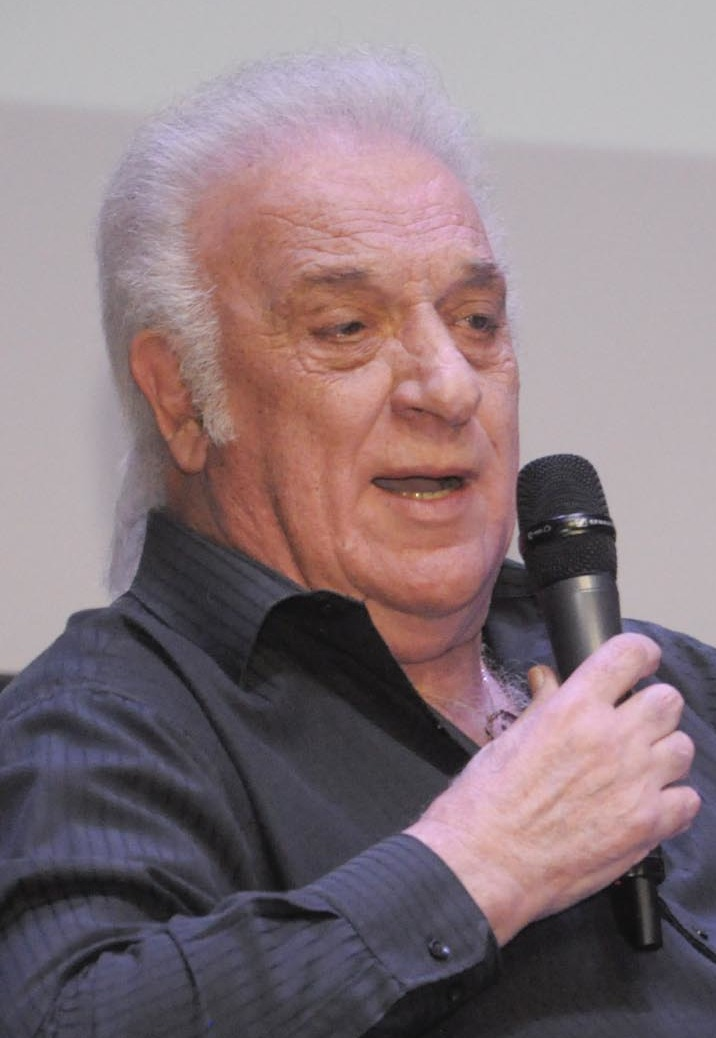
- Basile in 2013

Personal information
- Date of birth: 1 November 1943 (age 82)
- Place of birth: Bahía Blanca, Argentina
- Position: Centre-back

Youth career
- –1964: Bella Vista de Bahía Blanca

Senior career*
Years	Team	Apps	(Gls)
1964–1970	Racing Club	163	(19)
1971–1975	Huracán	97	(4)

International career
1968–1973	Argentina	8	(1)

Managerial career
- 1975–1976: Chacarita Juniors
- 1976: Rosario Central
- 1978: Racing Club
- 1979: Racing de Córdoba
- 1980: Instituto de Córdoba
- 1981: Racing de Córdoba
- 1982: Huracán
- 1982: Nacional
- 1983: Racing de Córdoba
- 1983: Talleres de Córdoba
- 1984–1986: Vélez Sársfield
- 1986–1989: Racing Club
- 1989–1990: Vélez Sársfield
- 1991–1994: Argentina
- 1995: Atlético de Madrid
- 1996–1997: Racing Club
- 1998: San Lorenzo
- 2000–2001: América
- 2004: Colón de Santa Fe
- 2005–2006: Boca Juniors
- 2006–2008: Argentina
- 2009–2010: Boca Juniors
- 2012: Racing Club
Medal record
Men's football
Representing Argentina (as manager)
Copa América
Winner	1991 Chile
Winner	1993 Ecuador
Runner-up	2007 Venezuela
FIFA Confederations Cup
Winner	1992 Saudi Arabia
CONMEBOL–UEFA Cup of Champions
Winner	1993 Argentina
- * Club domestic league appearances and goals

Alfio "Coco" Basile (born 1 November 1943) is an Argentine football manager and former player. He played for Racing Club de Avellaneda and Huracán before becoming a manager. He coached many teams during his career, being most notable Racing Club de Avellaneda (where he won the Supercopa Libertadores, the first international title for the club since 1967), the Argentina national team (with 4 titles won) and Boca Juniors, where he won five titles in two years.

Basile holds the distinction of being the only manager to coach both Diego Maradona and Lionel Messi internationally, having called both up to the national team during his two separate tenures as Argentina's manager. The last team managed by Basile was Racing Club de Avellaneda, which he left in 2012.

== Playing career ==
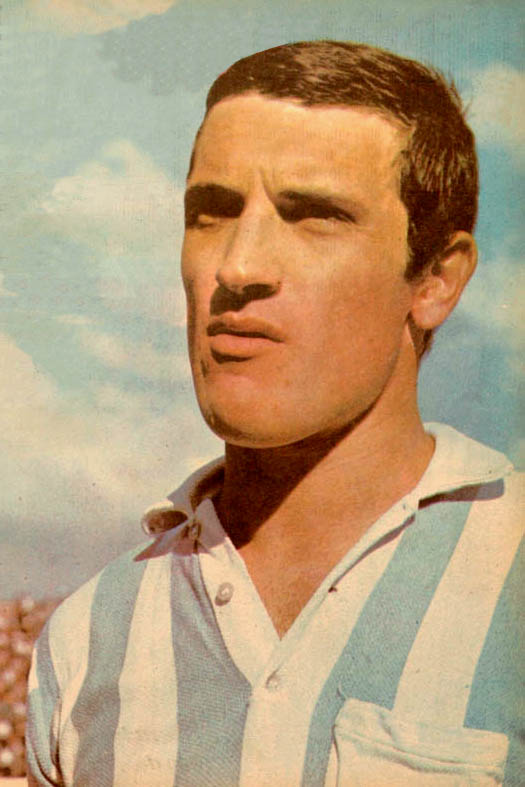
Basile during his tenure on Racing Club, 1966

Born in Bahía Blanca, Basile is of Sicilian descent through his grandparents, who emigrated from Catania. He started his playing career at Club Bella Vista in his home city. From 1964 to 1970 he played for Racing Club, where he played as midfielder until the arrival of coach Juan José Pizutti, who moved him to the defensive line to play as centre-back. In that position, Basile formed a remembered defensive pair with Roberto Perfumo, winning three titles with the club, which reached its peak with the Intercontinental Cup won in 1967 to Celtic FC, the first intercontinental title for an Argentine team.

Basile totalized 186 matches with Racing Club before moving to Huracán, where he was a mainstay of the 1973 Metropolitano champions under coach César Luis Menotti. He also played for the Argentina national team. Basile retired as a player in 1975.

A Racing Club member took me to the club to try there. Carlos Peucelle was the coach by then. (After passing the test) I started to play at the 7th division, then promoted to higher ones, always playing as "number 5" (central midfielder). Last year, Dellatorre hanging me debut in Primera División, in the last round of the championship v. Huracán. I played as "number 6" (centre-back)

— Basile in an interview with El Gráfico, 1965

== Managerial career ==
After retirement as a player, Basile coached a number of Argentine teams, most notably Rosario Central, Racing Club, Huracán, Vélez Sársfield, Uruguayan Nacional, and Atlético Madrid.

His career as a coach reached its first peak in the early 1990s, when he led the Argentina national football team to win two Copa América, one FIFA Confederations Cup and one CONMEBOL–UEFA Cup of Champions victories. The run-up to the 1994 FIFA World Cup looked smooth until a 5–0 defeat at home to Colombia. Following that traumatic event, Diego Maradona was brought back from retirement to take part in the play-off against Australia.

In the World Cup itself, Argentina opened with two impressive victories over Greece and Nigeria. However, controversy was soon to appear. Maradona was tested for doping after the Nigeria match, and was suspended after ephedrine was found in his sample. Argentina still progressed to the last 16 despite a 2–0 defeat by Bulgaria, but morale was shattered and the team was eliminated after losing to Romania.

After resigning over the World Cup disappointment, Basile went on to coach San Lorenzo de Almagro, Club América of México and Colón de Santa Fe with varying degrees of success. In July 2005 he assumed the post of coach at Boca Juniors, winning the Recopa Sudamericana 2005 just a month later. He then won his first Argentine league title in the 2005 Apertura tournament. Four days later, Boca won the Copa Sudamericana 2005 against UNAM Pumas of Mexico.

In July 2006, he was once again offered the position of Argentina national football team coach and accepted the job taking over from José Pekerman. Before starting his new job, Basile stayed with Boca Juniors until 14 September 2006, when the team won a second consecutive Recopa Sudamericana 2006 with a victory over São Paulo FC of Brazil.

Vocal about his preference for the Italian Serie A and the Spanish La Liga over the English league, he made waves in England when he called for Carlos Tevez and Javier Mascherano to transfer to Italy, claiming the switch would be better for the latter "even if he would have to play in the second division" with Juventus.

Basile led Argentina through the 2007 Copa América, which would be Lionel Messi's debut in the tournament. Argentina won all three games in the group stage, beating the United States, Colombia and Paraguay. After convincing victories over Peru and Mexico in the quarter-final and semi-final, respectively, they were favorites to beat Brazil in the final, but were defeated 3–0.

On 16 October 2008, amidst the controversy over the historic defeat that Argentina suffered against Chile in the World Cup qualifiers, the first time they had lost to Chile in 35 years, Basile tendered his resignation. This eventually paved the road to the appointment of Diego Maradona as national team coach. As a coach, Basile had in total two tenures at the helm of the Argentina national football team, 1991–1994 and 2006–2008.

On 1 July 2009, Basile returned to Boca Juniors after three years, replacing Carlos Ischia. But after a series of bad results, especially the failure to qualify for the Copa Libertadores 2010 and a crushing 3–1 defeat to archrivals River Plate during a summer tournament at Mar del Plata, he resigned on 21 January 2010.

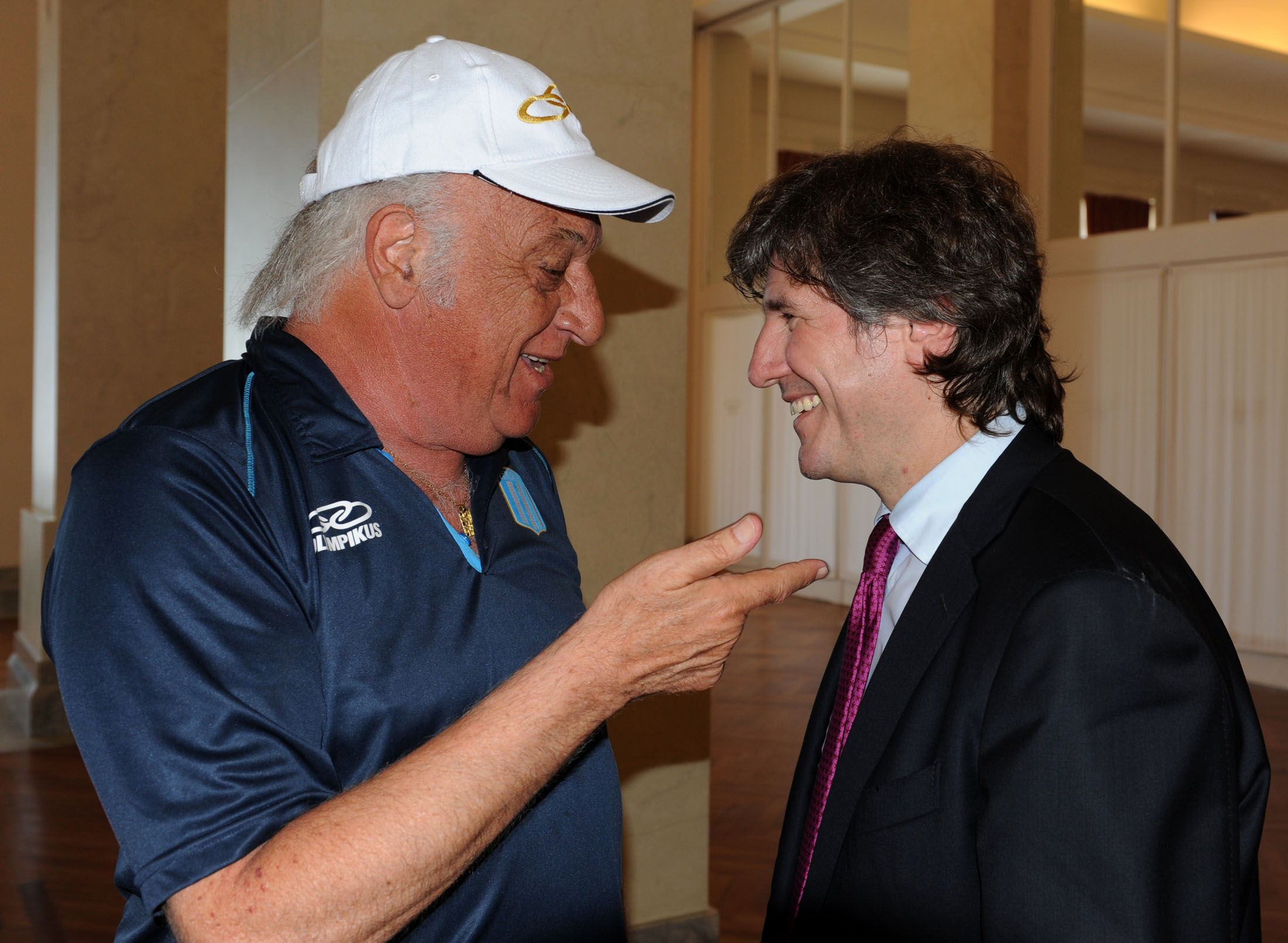
Basile as coach of Racing Club talking with then vice-president of Argentina, Amado Boudou in Mar del Plata, January 2012

On 26 December 2011, Basile returned to Racing Club for his fourth spell as their coach, taking over from Diego Simeone. One year later, he resigned after a confusing incident in the Estadio Libertadores de América's change room, with Racing forward Teo Gutiérrez being accused of pointing a gun at a teammate.

Since his departure from Racing, Basile has not managed any team, stating he is "retired" from the activity. Basile has occasionally appeared in some interviews and the TV show Buenos Muchachos (Good Guys) where he participated along with fellow Héctor Veira and singer Cacho Castaña.

In 2019, Basile offered to manage Flat Earth FC, a Spanish amateur team based around the idea that the Earth is flat. He said that he agreed with club president Javi Poves's views on the subject.

== Honours ==
=== Player ===
Racing Club

- Primera División: 1966
- Copa Libertadores: 1967
- Intercontinental Cup: 1967
- Intercontinental Champions' Supercup runner-up: 1969

Huracán

- Primera División: 1973 Metropolitano

=== Manager ===
Racing Club

- Supercopa Sudamericana: 1988
- Recopa Sudamericana runner-up: 1989

Vélez Sarsfield

- Argentine Primera División runner-up: 1985 Nacional

Club América

- CONCACAF Giants Cup: 2001

Boca Juniors

- Primera División: 2005 Apertura, 2006 Clausura
- Copa Sudamericana: 2005
- Recopa Sudamericana: 2005, 2006

Argentina

- Copa América: 1991, 1993; runner-up: 2007
- FIFA Confederations Cup: 1992
- CONMEBOL–UEFA Cup of Champions: 1993
