= Javier Claut =

Argentine footballer

Personal information
- Full name: Ornaldo Javier Claut
- Date of birth: 8 June 1970 (age 56)
- Place of birth: Buenos Aires, Argentina
- Height: 1.80 m (5 ft 11 in)
- Position: Midfielder

Senior career*
Years	Team	Apps	(Gls)
1990–1993	River Plate	29	(2)
1993–1994	Banfield	13	(0)
1994–1995	Quilmes	33	(2)
1996	Villarreal CF	1	(0)
1996–1998	Ferro Carril Oeste	50	(0)
1998–1999	Quilmes	18	(0)
1999–2000	Tigre	14	(0)
2000	Al-Ain	?	(?)
2000–2002	Locarno	23	(5)
2004–2005	Defensores de Belgrano	14	(1)
2005–2007	Deportivo Laferrere	40	(1)
- * Club domestic league appearances and goals

Ornaldo Javier Claut (born 8 June 1970 in Buenos Aires) is a retired Argentine football player who played for a number of clubs both in Argentina and Europe, including Club Atlético River Plate, Club Atlético Banfield and Villarreal CF.

== See also ==
- Football in Argentina
- List of football clubs in Argentina
