= Julio Zamora =

Argentine footballer and manager

Personal information
- Full name: Julio Alberto Zamora Ureña
- Date of birth: 11 March 1966 (age 60)
- Place of birth: Rosario, Argentina
- Height: 1.72 m (5 ft 8 in)
- Positions: Striker; left winger

Senior career*
Years	Team	Apps	(Gls)
1985–1987	Newell's Old Boys		
1987–1988	River Plate		
1988	Sabadell	16	(2)
1989–1990	River Plate		
1990–1993	Newell's Old Boys	84	(13)
1993–1996	Cruz Azul	88	(32)
1997–1998	Newell's Old Boys	48	(9)
1999	Wilstermann	15	(1)
1999–2000	Platense		

International career
1992–1993	Argentina	3	(0)

Managerial career
- 2002: Aurora
- 2004: Tiro Federal
- 2008: Olmedo
- 2010–2011: Aurora
- 2012: Melgar
- 2013: Sportivo Huracan
- 2013–2014: José Gálvez FBC
- 2014: Binacional
- 2015: San Simón
- 2016: Wilstermann
- 2017: San José
- 2017: Real Potosí
- 2021: Nueva Cliza
- 2023: San Antonio Bulo Bulo
- * Club domestic league appearances and goals

Julio Alberto Zamora Ureña (born 11 March 1966 in Rosario, Argentina) is an Argentine football manager and former player, who played as a forward or midfielder.

As a footballer he played for the Argentina national team and a number of clubs in Argentina, Spain, Mexico and Bolivia.

Zamora started his career in 1985 with Newell's Old Boys. He also played for River Plate and Sevilla in the 1980s. In 1990 Zamora returned to Newell's where he was part of the squad that won the 1990-91 and Clausura 1992 championships. In 1993 Zamora was part of the victorious Argentina squad for the Copa América 1993. Between 1993 and 1996 Zamora played in Mexico with Cruz Azul, he returned to Argentina in 1997, once again to Newell's Old Boys.

Towards the end of his career he played for Wilstermann in Bolivia. His last professional club was Club Atlético Platense of the Argentine 2nd division. He retired in 2000.

== Honours ==
=== Club ===
Newell's Old Boys

- Primera División Argentina: 1990–91, Clausura 1992

Cruz Azul

- Copa Mexico: 1996
- CONCACAF Champions' Cup: 1996

=== International ===
Argentina

- Copa América: 1993
