= Alejandro Mancuso =

Argentine footballer (born 1968)

Personal information
- Full name: Alejandro Victor Mancuso
- Date of birth: 4 September 1968 (age 58)
- Place of birth: Ciudadela, Argentina
- Height: 1.75 m (5 ft 9 in)
- Position: Midfielder

Youth career
- Ferro Carril Oeste

Senior career*
Years	Team	Apps	(Gls)
1988–1989	Ferro Carril Oeste	1	(0)
1989–1993	Vélez Sársfield	94	(6)
1993–1994	Boca Juniors	55	(2)
1995	Palmeiras	57	(2)
1996–1997	Flamengo	66	(5)
1997–1998	Independiente	20	(0)
1998	Badajoz	12	(1)
1999	Santa Cruz	0	
2000	Bella Vista	2	

International career
1992–1994	Argentina	10	(0)
Medal record
Men's football
Representing Argentina
Copa América
Winner	1993 Ecuador
CONMEBOL–UEFA Cup of Champions
Winner	1993 Argentina
- * Club domestic league appearances and goals as of July 2007

Alejandro Víctor Mancuso (born 4 September 1968 in Ciudadela) is an Argentine former footballer who played as a midfielder.

During his club career in Argentina, he played for Ferro Carril Oeste, Club Atlético Vélez Sársfield, Boca Juniors and Club Atlético Independiente. He is one of the best friends of Alejandro Sabella. After leaving his country, he played in Brazil, Spain and Uruguay. In 1996, he played for Flamengo where he won the Rio de Janeiro State Championship and the 1996 Copa de Oro. Flamengo's supporters still remember his class and his courage in the matches.

In November 2008, Diego Armando Maradona was named coach of Argentina national football team, and Mancuso joined him in the commission. He also said that after this cycle, he intends to manage Flamengo.

== Honours ==
=== Club ===
Boca Juniors

- Copa de Oro Sudamericana: 1993

Flamengo

- Campeonato Carioca: 1996
- Copa de Oro Sudamericana: 1996

=== International ===
Argentina

- CONMEBOL–UEFA Cup of Champions: 1993
- Copa América: 1993
