= Fabián Garfagnoli =

Argentine footballer

Personal information
- Full name: Fabián Alberto Garfagnoli
- Date of birth: August 17, 1970 (age 56)
- Place of birth: Santa Fe, Argentina
- Height: 1.76 m (5 ft 9 in)
- Position: Defender

Senior career*
Years	Team	Apps	(Gls)
1987–1994	Newell's Old Boys	107	(4)
1995-1996	Flamengo	50	(2)
1996–2002	Argentinos Juniors	151	(3)
2002–2003	Aucas	23	(1)
- * Club domestic league appearances and goals

Fabián Alberto Garfagnoli (born 17 August 1970 in Santa Fe) is a former Argentine footballer. He is a member of the backroom staff at Tiro Federal.

Garfagnoli started his professional career with Newell's Old Boys in 1987, he was part of championship winning teams in his early years at the club. In 1996, he moved to Argentinos Juniors and helped them to win the Argentine 2nd division in 1996–1997. He stayed with the club until 2002 when he moved to Tiro Federal.

== Titles ==
Season	Team	Title
1990–1991	Newell's Old Boys	Primera División Argentina
Clausura 1992	Newell's Old Boys	Primera División Argentina
1996–1997	Argentinos Juniors	Primera B Nacional
Clausura 2003	Tiro Federal	Torneo Argentino A

== Coaching career ==
Garfagnoli became a youth team coach at Tiro Federal where he had one game as interim manager of the first team in 2007.
