= 2022 Finalissima =

- Event: Finalissima
Italy	Argentina
0	3
- Date: 1 June 2022
- Venue: Wembley Stadium, London
- Man of the Match: Lionel Messi (Argentina)
- Referee: Piero Maza (Chile)
- Attendance: 87,112
- Weather: Clear night 17 °C (63 °F); 47% humidity

The 2022 Finalissima (lit. 'Grand Final') was the third edition of the intercontinental football match between the winners of the previous South American and European championships, and the first edition rebranded as Finalissima. The match featured Italy, winners of UEFA Euro 2020 (held in 2021), and Argentina, winners of the 2021 Copa América. It was played at Wembley Stadium in London on 1 June 2022. The match, a revival of the Artemio Franchi Cup last played 29 years prior, was organised by UEFA and CONMEBOL as part of a renewed partnership between the two confederations.

Argentina, winners of the last competition in 1993, won the match 3–0 for their second Finalissima title.

== Background ==
In 1985 and 1993, the winners of the prior UEFA European Championship and Copa América tournaments played in the Artemio Franchi Cup (also known as the European/South American Nations Cup), a one-off match organised by UEFA and CONMEBOL. It was the national team equivalent to the former Intercontinental Cup on the club level, which was played between the winners of the European Cup/UEFA Champions League and Copa Libertadores. France won the 1985 Artemio Franchi Cup in Paris, while Argentina won the 1993 match in Mar del Plata. However, the competition was discontinued thereafter. The Artemio Franchi Cup can be considered a precursor of the King Fahd Cup/FIFA Confederations Cup, played in 1992 for the first time and organised by FIFA from 1997, which featured the title holders of all the continental championships and FIFA World Cup. After the 2017 edition, FIFA announced on 15 March 2019 that the tournament would be abolished.

On 12 February 2020, UEFA and CONMEBOL signed a renewed memorandum of understanding meant to enhance cooperation between the two organisations. As part of the agreement, a joint UEFA–CONMEBOL committee examined the possibility of staging European–South American intercontinental matches, for both men's and women's football and across various age groups. On 28 September 2021, UEFA and CONMEBOL confirmed that the UEFA European Championship and Copa América winners would face each other in an intercontinental match, with the agreement initially covering three editions starting in 2022. The first edition was confirmed to take place during the June 2022 international window at a venue to be confirmed. On 15 December 2021, UEFA and CONMEBOL again signed a renewed memorandum of understanding lasting until 2028, which included specific provisions on opening a joint office in London and the potential organisation of various football events. The match was confirmed to take place in London on 1 June 2022, with the venue yet to be decided. On 22 March 2022, UEFA announced the match would take place at Wembley Stadium. At the same time, the brand identity was revealed, and UEFA announced that the "CONMEBOL–UEFA Cup of Champions" was the new name for the Artemio Franchi Cup.

== Teams ==
Team	Confederation	Qualification	Previous participations (bold indicates winners)	FIFA Ranking March 2022
Italy	UEFA	Winners of UEFA Euro 2020	None	6
Argentina^{TH}	CONMEBOL	Winners of the 2021 Copa América	1 (**1993**)	4

Italy qualified for the match by virtue of winning UEFA Euro 2020 (held in 2021), having defeated England on penalties in the final, also held at Wembley, for their second UEFA European Championship title. Argentina qualified by winning the 2021 Copa América, defeating Brazil 1–0 in the final for a record-equalling 15th Copa América title, their first trophy in 28 years.

== Venue ==
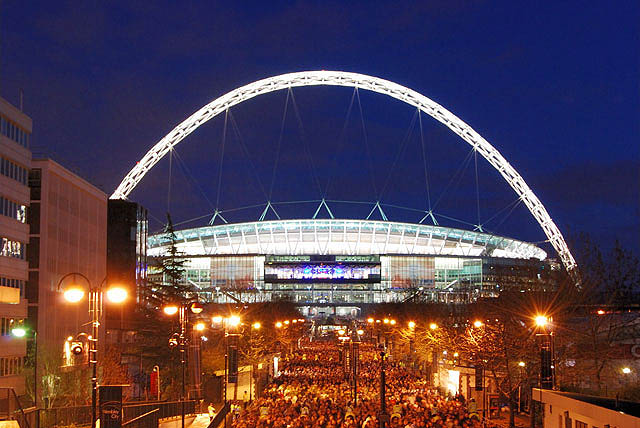
Wembley Stadium in London, the venue of the match

The match was held at Wembley Stadium in London, England. Wembley Stadium opened in 2007 on the site of the original stadium, the demolition of which took place between 2002 and 2003. Owned by the Football Association (FA), it serves as England's national football stadium. The stadium was a host venue of UEFA Euro 2020, including the final, won by Italy on penalties over England. The original stadium, formerly known as the Empire Stadium, opened in 1923 and hosted matches at the 1966 FIFA World Cup, including the final, which saw hosts England beat West Germany 4–2 after extra time, and at UEFA Euro 1996, including the final, in which Germany defeated the Czech Republic. Wembley also hosts the annual FA Cup Final, doing so since the White Horse Final of 1923 (excluding 2001 to 2006, when the stadium was being rebuilt).

== Squads ==
Both national teams had to submit a squad of 23 players – of which three had to be goalkeepers – by 29 May 2022, three days prior to the match.

=== Italy ===
Italy announced a 39-man preliminary squad on 23 May 2022. The squad was extended to 45 players on 27 May, with eight players added while Domenico Berardi and Andrea Pinamonti withdrew injured. The final squad was announced on 30 May.

Manager: Roberto Mancini

No.	Pos.	Player	Date of birth (age)	Caps	Goals	Club
1	GK	Alessio Cragno	28 June 1994 (aged 27)	2	0	(Italian Football Federation) Cagliari
2	DF	Giovanni Di Lorenzo	4 August 1993 (aged 28)	19	2	(Italian Football Federation) Napoli
3	DF	Giorgio Chiellini (captain)	14 August 1984 (aged 37)	116	8	(Italian Football Federation) Juventus
4	DF	Leonardo Spinazzola	25 March 1993 (aged 29)	18	0	(Italian Football Federation) Roma
5	MF	Manuel Locatelli	8 January 1998 (aged 24)	21	3	(Italian Football Federation) Juventus
6	DF	Manuel Lazzari	29 November 1993 (aged 28)	2	0	(Italian Football Federation) Lazio
7	DF	Alessandro Florenzi	11 March 1991 (aged 31)	47	2	(Italian Football Federation) Milan
8	MF	Jorginho	20 December 1991 (aged 30)	43	5	(The Football Association) Chelsea
9	FW	Andrea Belotti	20 December 1993 (aged 28)	42	12	(Italian Football Federation) Torino
10	MF	Federico Bernardeschi	16 February 1994 (aged 28)	38	6	(Italian Football Federation) Juventus
11	FW	Matteo Politano	3 August 1993 (aged 28)	4	3	(Italian Football Federation) Napoli
12	MF	Matteo Pessina	21 April 1997 (aged 25)	12	4	(Italian Football Federation) Atalanta
13	DF	Emerson Palmieri	3 August 1994 (aged 27)	26	0	(French Football Federation) Lyon
14	GK	Alex Meret	22 March 1997 (aged 25)	2	0	(Italian Football Federation) Napoli
15	DF	Francesco Acerbi	10 February 1988 (aged 34)	23	1	(Italian Football Federation) Lazio
16	MF	Bryan Cristante	3 March 1995 (aged 27)	23	2	(Italian Football Federation) Roma
17	FW	Gianluca Scamacca	1 January 1999 (aged 23)	3	0	(Italian Football Federation) Sassuolo
18	MF	Nicolò Barella	7 February 1997 (aged 25)	36	7	(Italian Football Federation) Internazionale
19	DF	Leonardo Bonucci	1 May 1987 (aged 35)	115	8	(Italian Football Federation) Juventus
20	MF	Lorenzo Pellegrini	19 June 1996 (aged 25)	21	3	(Italian Football Federation) Roma
21	GK	Gianluigi Donnarumma	25 February 1999 (aged 23)	42	0	(French Football Federation) Paris Saint-Germain
22	FW	Giacomo Raspadori	18 February 2000 (aged 22)	9	3	(Italian Football Federation) Sassuolo
23	DF	Alessandro Bastoni	13 April 1999 (aged 23)	11	0	(Italian Football Federation) Internazionale

=== Argentina ===
Argentina announced a 35-man preliminary squad on 13 May 2022. The squad was reduced to 29 players on 20 May. The final squad was announced on 1 June.

Manager: Lionel Scaloni

No.	Pos.	Player	Date of birth (age)	Caps	Goals	Club
1	GK	Franco Armani	16 October 1986 (aged 35)	17	0	(Argentine Football Association) River Plate
2	DF	Juan Foyth	12 January 1998 (aged 24)	14	0	(Royal Spanish Football Federation) Villarreal
3	DF	Nicolás Tagliafico	31 August 1992 (aged 29)	39	0	(Royal Dutch Football Association) Ajax
4	DF	Nahuel Molina	6 April 1998 (aged 24)	15	0	(Italian Football Federation) Udinese
5	MF	Alexis Mac Allister	24 December 1998 (aged 23)	4	0	(The Football Association) Brighton & Hove Albion
6	DF	Germán Pezzella	27 June 1991 (aged 30)	28	2	(Royal Spanish Football Federation) Real Betis
7	MF	Rodrigo De Paul	24 May 1994 (aged 28)	39	2	(Royal Spanish Football Federation) Atlético Madrid
8	DF	Marcos Acuña	28 October 1991 (aged 30)	41	0	(Royal Spanish Football Federation) Sevilla
9	FW	Julián Álvarez	31 January 2000 (aged 22)	7	1	(Argentine Football Association) River Plate
10	FW	Lionel Messi (captain)	24 June 1987 (aged 34)	160	81	(French Football Federation) Paris Saint-Germain
11	FW	Ángel Di María (vice-captain)	14 February 1988 (aged 34)	121	24	(French Football Federation) Paris Saint-Germain
12	GK	Gerónimo Rulli	20 May 1992 (aged 30)	3	0	(Royal Spanish Football Federation) Villarreal
13	DF	Cristian Romero	27 April 1998 (aged 24)	10	1	(The Football Association) Tottenham Hotspur
14	MF	Exequiel Palacios	5 October 1998 (aged 23)	18	0	(German Football Association) Bayer Leverkusen
15	MF	Nicolás González	6 April 1998 (aged 24)	19	3	(Italian Football Federation) Fiorentina
16	DF	Lisandro Martínez	18 January 1998 (aged 24)	6	0	(Royal Dutch Football Association) Ajax
17	FW	Papu Gómez	15 February 1988 (aged 34)	13	3	(Royal Spanish Football Federation) Sevilla
18	MF	Guido Rodríguez	12 April 1994 (aged 28)	23	1	(Royal Spanish Football Federation) Real Betis
19	DF	Nicolás Otamendi	12 February 1988 (aged 34)	90	4	(Portuguese Football Federation) Benfica
20	MF	Giovani Lo Celso	9 April 1996 (aged 26)	38	2	(Royal Spanish Football Federation) Villarreal
21	FW	Paulo Dybala	15 November 1993 (aged 28)	32	2	(Italian Football Federation) Juventus
22	FW	Lautaro Martínez	22 August 1997 (aged 24)	37	19	(Italian Football Federation) Internazionale
23	GK	Emiliano Martínez	2 September 1992 (aged 29)	16	0	(The Football Association) Aston Villa

== Pre-match ==
=== Identity ===
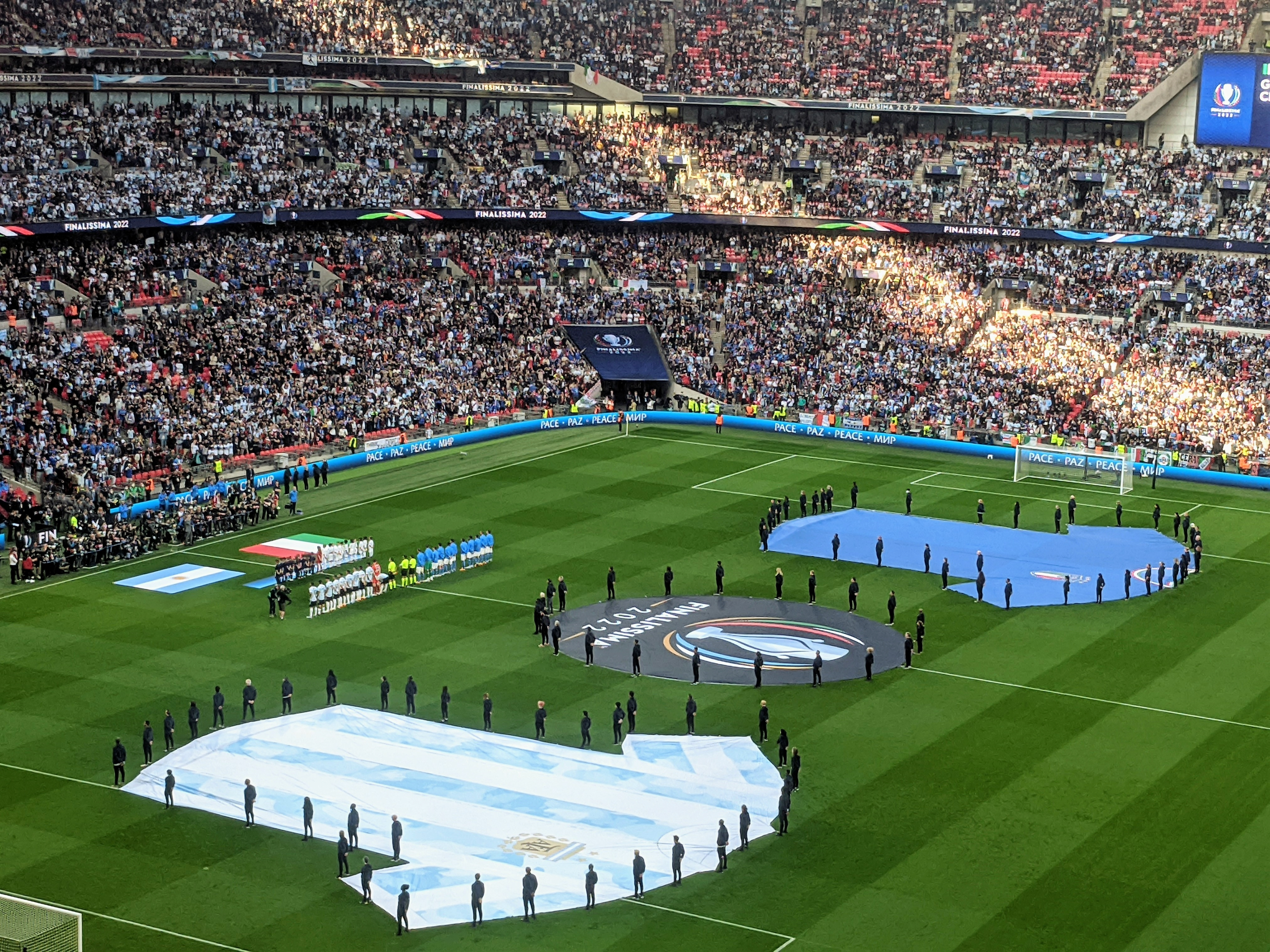
The stadium with giant sized representations of both kits, before the match

UEFA revealed the brand identity for the match on 22 March 2022. The match was known as the Finalissima, Italian for "grand final". The logo was based on the laurel wreath, a symbol of victory. It features ribbons in the colours of the competing nations, the green, white and red of Italy on the left, and the white and light blue of Argentina. In addition, several ribbons are in platinum and gold, intended to highlight the significance of the match. According to UEFA, the ribbons are "symbolic of the strong bonds between CONMEBOL and UEFA, and of their commitment to the development of football beyond their geographical zones".

=== Ticketing ===
The stadium capacity was 86,000 for the match, with tickets sold to fans and the general public on a first-come, first-served basis via UEFA.com. Available from 24 March 2022, the tickets were available in four price categories: £25, £40, £55 and £99.

=== Officials ===
On 30 May 2022, 37-year-old Chilean referee Piero Maza was announced as the referee for the match, made as a joint appointment by CONMEBOL and UEFA. Maza had been a FIFA referee since 2018, though the match was his first senior international fixture as a referee. However, Maza did previously serve as a fourth official and VAR assistant at the 2019 Copa América, as well as a VAR at the 2019 FIFA U-17 World Cup. He was joined by his fellow countrymen Christian Schiemann and Claudio Ríos as assistant referees. Spanish referee Jesús Gil Manzano served as the fourth official, with his compatriots Alejandro Hernández Hernández and Juan Martínez Munuera serving as the VAR and one of the VAR assistants, respectively. Tiago Martins of Portugal was the other VAR assistant.

== Match ==
=== Details ===
1 June 2022
19:45 BST

Italy	0–3	Argentina
	Report	La. Martínez 28'; Di María 45+1'; Dybala 90+4'

Wembley Stadium, London
Attendance: 87,112
Referee: Piero Maza (Chile)

**Italy**	**Argentina**

GK	21	Gianluigi Donnarumma
RB	2	Giovanni Di Lorenzo	(yellow card) 72'
CB	19	Leonardo Bonucci	(yellow card) 39'
CB	3	Giorgio Chiellini (c)		(substituted off) 46'
LB	13	Emerson Palmieri		(substituted off) 77'
DM	8	Jorginho
CM	12	Matteo Pessina		(substituted off) 62'
CM	18	Nicolò Barella	(yellow card) 77'
RF	10	Federico Bernardeschi		(substituted off) 46'
CF	9	Andrea Belotti		(substituted off) 46'
LF	22	Giacomo Raspadori
Substitutions:
DF	6	Manuel Lazzari		(substituted on) 46'
FW	17	Gianluca Scamacca		(substituted on) 46'
MF	5	Manuel Locatelli		(substituted on) 46'
DF	4	Leonardo Spinazzola		(substituted on) 62'
DF	23	Alessandro Bastoni		(substituted on) 77'
Manager:
Roberto Mancini

GK	23	Emiliano Martínez
RB	4	Nahuel Molina
CB	13	Cristian Romero		(substituted off) 85'
CB	19	Nicolás Otamendi	(yellow card) 22'
LB	3	Nicolás Tagliafico
DM	18	Guido Rodríguez
CM	20	Giovani Lo Celso		(substituted off) 90+1'
CM	7	Rodrigo De Paul		(substituted off) 76'
RF	10	Lionel Messi (c)
CF	22	Lautaro Martínez		(substituted off) 85'
LF	11	Ángel Di María		(substituted off) 90+1'
Substitutions:
MF	14	Exequiel Palacios		(substituted on) 76'
DF	6	Germán Pezzella		(substituted on) 85'
FW	9	Julián Álvarez		(substituted on) 85'
MF	15	Nicolás González		(substituted on) 90+1'
FW	21	Paulo Dybala		(substituted on) 90+1'
Manager:
Lionel Scaloni

Man of the Match:
Lionel Messi (Argentina)

Assistant referees:
Christian Schiemann (Chile)
Claudio Ríos (Chile)
Fourth official:
Jesús Gil Manzano (Spain)
Video assistant referee:
Alejandro Hernández Hernández (Spain)
Assistant video assistant referees:
Juan Martínez Munuera (Spain)
Tiago Martins (Portugal)

**Match rules**

- 90 minutes
- Penalty shoot-out if scores level
- Maximum of twelve named substitutes
- Maximum of five substitutions (Note: Each team was given only three opportunities to make substitutions, excluding substitutions made at half-time.)

=== Statistics ===
First half
Statistic	Italy	Argentina
Goals scored	0	2
Total shots	5	6
Shots on target	2	3
Saves	1	2
Ball possession	48%	52%
Corner kicks	3	1
Fouls committed	5	10
Offsides	1	0
Yellow cards	1	1
Red cards	0	0

Second half
Statistic	Italy	Argentina
Goals scored	0	1
Total shots	2	11
Shots on target	1	6
Saves	5	1
Ball possession	42%	58%
Corner kicks	0	3
Fouls committed	8	6
Offsides	2	0
Yellow cards	2	0
Red cards	0	0

Overall
Statistic	Italy	Argentina
Goals scored	0	3
Total shots	7	17
Shots on target	3	9
Saves	6	3
Ball possession	45%	55%
Corner kicks	3	4
Fouls committed	13	16
Offsides	3	0
Yellow cards	3	1
Red cards	0	0
