= 1993 Artemio Franchi Cup =

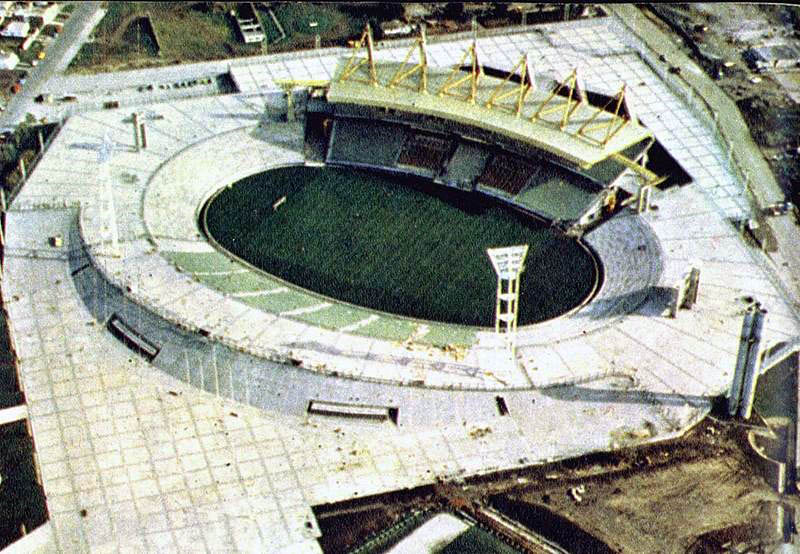
- The Estadio José María Minella in Mar del Plata hosted the match.
- Event: Artemio Franchi Cup
Argentina	Denmark
1	1
- After extra time Argentina won 5–4 on penalties
- Date: 24 February 1993
- Venue: Estadio José María Minella, Mar del Plata
- Referee: Sándor Puhl (Hungary)
- Attendance: 34,683

The 1993 Artemio Franchi Cup was the second edition of the Artemio Franchi Cup, a football match between the winners of the previous South American and European championships. The match featured Argentina, winners of the 1991 Copa América, and Denmark, winners of UEFA Euro 1992. It was played at Estadio José María Minella in Mar del Plata, Argentina, on 24 February 1993.

Argentina won the match 5–4 on penalties following a 1–1 draw after extra time to win their first Artemio Franchi Cup title.

The match is also notable for having been the last title won by Diego Maradona in his career.

== Background ==
Maradona –who had recently returned to the national team for a friendly against Brazil after an absence of more than two years due to positive drug test– flew to Argentina to play this match along with his teammate Diego Simeone, both leaving their then-club Sevilla, which drew the ire of club president Luis Cuervas and the Andalusian fans by missing the Copa del Rey second leg against Valencia.

Sevilla would occasionally lose the series v Valencia, 2–0 in aggregate

== Teams ==
Team	Confederation	Qualification	Previous app.
Argentina	CONMEBOL	Winners of the 1991 Copa América	None
Denmark	UEFA	Winners of UEFA Euro 1992	None

Bold indicates winners

== Match ==
=== Summary ===
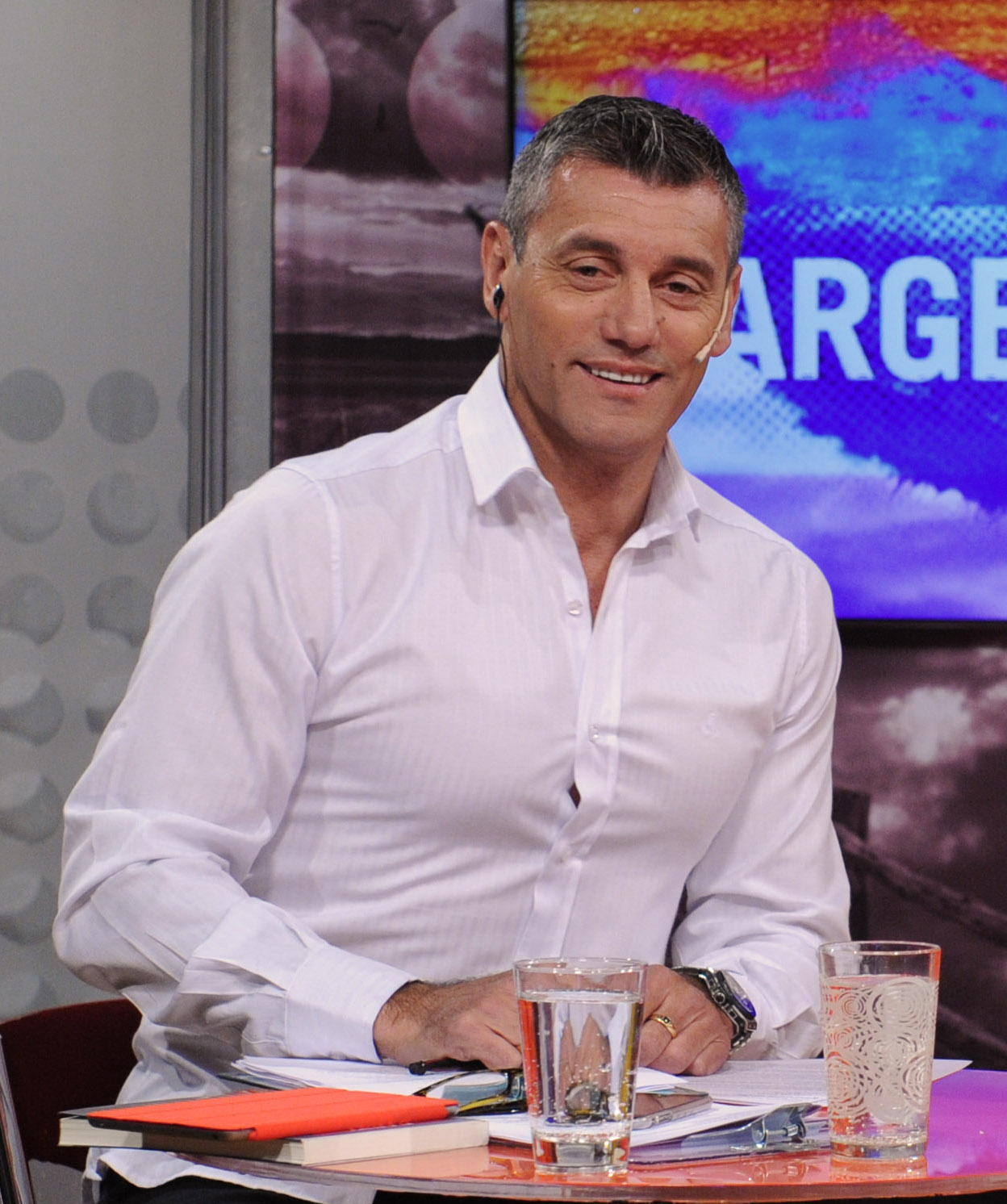
Argentine goalkeeper Sergio Goycochea saved two penalties to secure the win

The match began with Argentina dominating, with Maradona taking his first free kick after 3 minutes. Four minutes later, Leo Rodríguez made a great run, which Simeone headed well but failed to open the scoring. Batistuta then had a third attempt at goal after 10 minutes.

However, twelve minutes into the first half, Néstor Craviotto caught Sergio Goycochea off guard, heading the ball to score own goal that put Denmark ahead. Argentina’s immediate response to the unfavorable score –playing what, according to reports from the time, was the best match of the Alfio Basile era– created numerous scoring opportunities against the Danish goal; Batistuta headed a free kick from Maradona over the bar; Craviotto made a run down the right flank and passed to Batistuta, whose shot struck the post; Leo Rodríguez dribbled past several players but failed to score; and a header by Vázquez was cleared off the line by Mølby.

The long-awaited equalizer came in the 30th minute, when Simeone passed to Batistuta, whose shot appeared to be going wide but was secured by Caniggia. The level of the match dropped in the final 15 minutes, with some moments of skill from Brian Laudrup that caused problems for the Argentine defense.

The second half began with defensive errors by Argentina that Laudrup capitalized on with his skill, alongside flashes of Maradona’s magic and key saves by Schmeichel. In extra time, a free kick from Maradona struck the post, midfielder Darío Franco missed a scoring opportunity by sending the ball over the bar, a shot from Laudrup also hit the post, and Schmeichel made decisive saves against attempts by Simeone and Alejandro Mancuso. As the score remained the same, the Artemio Franchi Cup was decided by a penalty shootout.

The hero –as was the case in nearly every shootout during those years since his outstanding performance in 1990– was Argentina goalkeeper Sergio Goycochea, who saved attempts from Kim Vilfort and Bjarne Goldbæk. A precise penalty from Julio Saldaña secured the title for Argentina, allowing Maradona to lift his final official trophy with the national team.

=== Details ===
24 February 1993
15:00 ARST (UTC−2)

Argentina	1–1 (a.e.t.)	Denmark
Caniggia 30'	Report	Craviotto 12' (o.g.)
Penalties
Maradona (penalty scored); Batistuta (penalty scored); Simeone (penalty scored); Mancuso (penalty scored); Caniggia (penalty missed); Saldaña (penalty scored)	5–4	(penalty scored) Elstrup; (penalty scored) Mølby; (penalty scored) Nielsen; (penalty missed) Vilfort; (penalty scored) Laudrup; (penalty missed) Goldbæk

Estadio José María Minella, Mar del Plata
Attendance: 34,683
Referee: Sándor Puhl (Hungary)

**Argentina**	**Denmark**

GK	1	Sergio Goycochea
DF	4	Néstor Craviotto	(yellow card) 71'	(substituted off) 117'
DF	2	Jorge Borelli
DF	6	Sergio Vázquez	(yellow card) 22'
DF	3	Ricardo Altamirano
MF	14	Diego Simeone	(yellow card) 16'
MF	5	Alejandro Mancuso
MF	10	Diego Maradona (c)
MF	20	Leonardo Rodríguez		(substituted off) 61'
FW	9	Gabriel Batistuta
FW	7	Claudio Caniggia
Substitutes:
GK	12	Luis Islas
DF	16	Darío Franco		(substituted on) 61'
MF	15	Julio Saldaña		(substituted on) 117'
MF		Néstor Gorosito
FW		Alberto Acosta
Manager:
Alfio Basile

GK	1	Peter Schmeichel
DF	4	Lars Olsen (c)
DF	3	Marc Rieper
DF	6	Torben Piechnik		(substituted off) 38'
MF	8	Kim Vilfort
MF	2	Jakob Kjeldbjerg	(yellow card) 15'
MF	5	Henrik Larsen		(substituted off) 120+1'
MF	7	Johnny Mølby
MF	9	Bjarne Goldbæk	(yellow card) 17'
FW	10	Lars Elstrup
FW	11	Brian Laudrup
Substitutes:
GK		Mogens Krogh
MF	12	Michael Larsen		(substituted on) 120+1'
MF	13	Brian Nielsen	(yellow card) 69'	(substituted on) 38'
MF		Stig Tøfting
FW		Mark Strudal
Manager:
Richard Møller Nielsen

**Match rules**

- 90 minutes.
- 30 minutes of extra time if necessary.
- Penalty shoot-out if scores are still level.
- Five named substitutes.
- Maximum of two substitutions.

== Aftermath ==
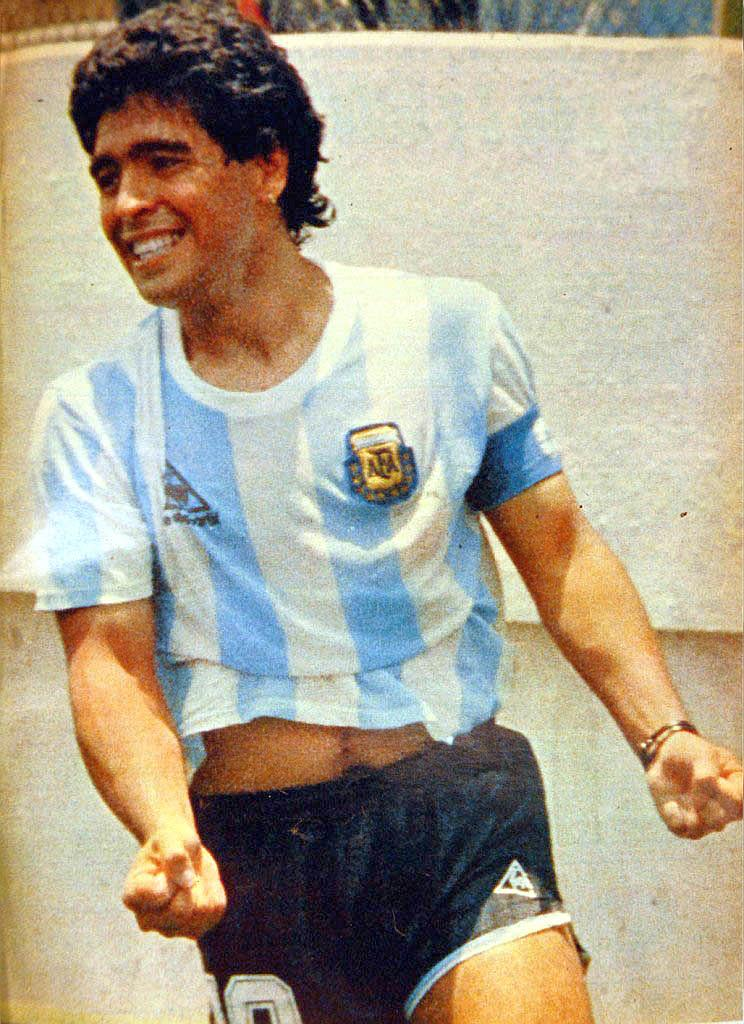
The Cup was the last title won by Argentina superstar Diego Maradona, who was then punished by Sevilla FC

After this match, Maradona would once again be absent for a time from the Argentine national team, until the 5–0 defeat to Colombia during the qualifiers for the 1994 FIFA World Cup in the United States prompted his return for the playoff matches against Australia.

Maradona's performance in the match was praised by the Danish, Denmark manager Richard Møller Nielsen stated: "it is clear that Maradona retains his hypersensitivity in his feet; that is why I believe that, with proper physical preparation, he could reach 80% of what he was in his prime" while Brian Laudrup was more emphatic by saying: "Diego on the pitch, with a ball at his feet, is a universal spectacle".

On the other hand, Argentina manager Alfio Basile preferred to focus on tactical matters, stating that, with Diego being so closely marked, Leo Rodríguez had to take on the role of team leader, further expressing that he was very satisfied with the team's performance

Upon his return to Seville, Maradona met with Sevilla FC executives and offered them his apologies. In March 1993, it was revealed that the club punished Maradona with a financial fine of $13,000, while his teammate Diego Simeone had to pay $8,700
