= 1992 King Fahd Cup =

كَأْسُ الْمَلِك فَهْد 1992

Tournament details
- Host country: Saudi Arabia
- Dates: 15–20 October
- Teams: 4 (from 4 confederations)
- Venue: 1 (in 1 host city)

Final positions
- Champions: Argentina (1st title)
- Runners-up: Saudi Arabia
- Third place: United States
- Fourth place: Ivory Coast

Tournament statistics
- Matches played: 4
- Goals scored: 18 (4.5 per match)
- Attendance: 169,500 (42,375 per match)
- Top scorer(s): (Argentina) Gabriel Batistuta (United States) Bruce Murray (2 goals each)
- Best player: (Argentina) Fernando Redondo

The 1992 King Fahd Cup (Arabic: كَأْسُ الْمَلِك فَهْد), named after Fahd of Saudi Arabia, was the first association football tournament of the competition that would later be known as the FIFA Confederations Cup. It was hosted by Saudi Arabia in October 1992, and was won by Argentina, who beat the hosts Saudi Arabia 3–1 in the final. The 1992 tournament was the only one not to feature a group stage and only featured four nations.

In 1997, FIFA took over the organization of the tournament, named it the FIFA Confederations Cup and staged the competition every two years and recognized the first two editions.

== Qualified teams ==
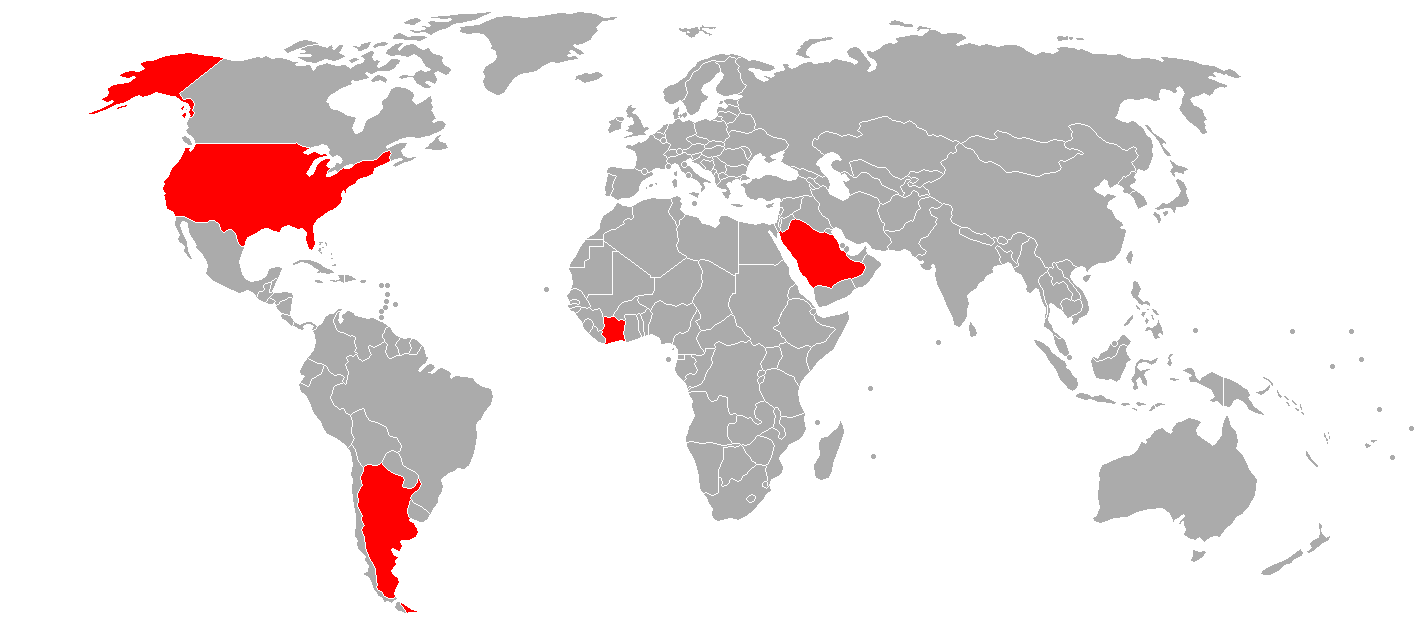
1992 King Fahd Cup participating teams

Team	Confederation	Qualification method	Participation no.
Saudi Arabia	AFC	Hosts and 1988 AFC Asian Cup winners	1st
United States	CONCACAF	1991 CONCACAF Gold Cup winners	1st
Argentina	CONMEBOL	1991 Copa América winners	1st
Ivory Coast	CAF	1992 African Cup of Nations winners	1st

== Venue ==
All matches were played at the 75,000-capacity King Fahd International Stadium in the city of Riyadh.

Location of the host city of the 1992 King Fahd Cup.	Riyadh
Location of the host city of the 1992 King Fahd Cup.	King Fahd International Stadium
Location of the host city of the 1992 King Fahd Cup.	Capacity: 75,000

== Match referees ==
Africa

- (Mauritius) Lim Kee Chong

Asia

- (Syria) Jamal Al Sharif

North, Central America and Caribbean

- (Costa Rica) Rodrigo Badilla

South America

- (Brazil) Ulisses Tavares da Silva

== Final tournament ==
=== Bracket ===
Semi-finals
16 October – Riyadh
Argentina	4
Ivory Coast	0
15 October – Riyadh
United States	0
Saudi Arabia	3

Final
20 October – Riyadh
Argentina	3
Saudi Arabia	1
Third place
19 October – Riyadh
United States	5
Ivory Coast	2

=== Semi-finals ===
15 October 1992

United States	0–3	Saudi Arabia
	Report	Al-Bishi 48' (pen.); Al-Thunayan 74'; Al-Muwallid 84'

King Fahd International Stadium, Riyadh
Attendance: 70,000
Referee: Ulisses Tavares da Silva (Brazil)

16 October 1992

Argentina	4–0	Ivory Coast
Batistuta 2', 10'; Altamirano 67'; Acosta 81'	Report

King Fahd International Stadium, Riyadh
Attendance: 15,000
Referee: Jamal Al Sharif (Syria)

=== Third place match ===
19 October 1992

United States	5–2	Ivory Coast
Balboa 12'; Jones 31'; Wynalda 56'; Murray 67', 83'	Report	Traoré 16'; Sié 76'

King Fahd International Stadium, Riyadh
Attendance: 9,500
Referee: Rodrigo Badilla (Costa Rica)

=== Final ===
20 October 1992

Argentina	3–1	Saudi Arabia
Rodríguez 18'; Caniggia 24'; Simeone 64'	Report	Al-Owairan 65'

King Fahd International Stadium, Riyadh
Attendance: 75,000
Referee: Lim Kee Chong (Mauritius)

== Statistics ==
=== Goalscorers ===
With two goals, Gabriel Batistuta and Bruce Murray were the top scorers in the tournament. In total, 18 goals were scored by 16 different players, with none of them credited as own goal.

2 goals

- (Argentina) Gabriel Batistuta
- (United States) Bruce Murray

1 goal

- (Argentina) Alberto Acosta
- (Argentina) Ricardo Altamirano
- (Argentina) Claudio Caniggia
- (Argentina) Leonardo Rodríguez
- (Argentina) Diego Simeone
- (Ivory Coast) Donald-Olivier Sié
- (Ivory Coast) Abdoulaye Traoré
- (Saudi Arabia) Fahad Al-Bishi
- (Saudi Arabia) Khaled Al-Muwallid
- (Saudi Arabia) Saeed Al-Owairan
- (Saudi Arabia) Yousuf Al-Thunayan
- (United States) Marcelo Balboa
- (United States) Cobi Jones
- (United States) Eric Wynalda

=== Tournament ranking ===
Per statistical convention in football, matches decided in extra time are counted as wins and losses, while matches decided by penalty shoot-outs are counted as draws.

Pos	Team	Pld	W	D	L	GF	GA	GD	Pts	Final result
1	Argentina	2	2	0	0	7	1	+6	4	Champions
2	Saudi Arabia (H)	2	1	0	1	4	3	+1	2	Runners-up
3	United States	2	1	0	1	5	5	0	2	Third place
4	Ivory Coast	2	0	0	2	2	9	−7	0	Fourth place

Source: FIFA
(H) Hosts
