= Finalissima =

International football match

- CONMEBOL–UEFA Cup of Champions, the Finalissima trophy
- Organiser(s): CONMEBOL; UEFA
- Founded: 1985; 41 years ago 2022; 4 years ago (re-established)
- Region: South America; Europe
- Teams: 2
- Related competitions: FIFA Confederations Cup (1992–2017)
- Current champions: Argentina (2nd title)
- Most championships: Argentina (2 titles)
- Website: uefa.com/finalissima
- 2022 Finalissima

The Finalissima, formerly known as the European/South American Nations Cup and also called Artemio Franchi Cup, (Note: The competition in 1985 and 1993 was referred to as the Artemio Franchi Cup by UEFA in contemporary publications, although it is also sometimes referred to as the Artemio Franchi Trophy.) is an intercontinental football match organised by CONMEBOL and UEFA and contested by the winners of the Copa América and Euros. Organised as an occasional one-off match, it is a national team equivalent to the defunct Intercontinental Cup between the club champions of Europe and South America. The competition was held twice, in 1985 and 1993, before being discontinued. It was relaunched in 2022, after the signing of a memorandum of understanding between CONMEBOL and UEFA.

== History ==
=== First editions and abolition ===
Created in 1985 as the European/South American Nations Cup, it was also referred to as the "Artemio Franchi Cup" due to the competition's trophy, named after Artemio Franchi, former president of UEFA who died in a road accident in 1983. It was organised jointly between CONMEBOL and the European confederation, acting as an intercontinental super cup. The competition was the national team-equivalent to the Intercontinental Cup on the club level, played between the winners of the European Cup/UEFA Champions League and Copa Libertadores. The competition was to be held every four years, with the venue alternating between Europe and South America. It was first played in 1985, between the winners of UEFA Euro 1984, France, and the winners of the 1983 Copa América, Uruguay. France hosted the match at the Parc des Princes in Paris, and won 2–0. The competition did not take place four years later, as the Netherlands (UEFA Euro 1988 winners) and Uruguay (1987 Copa América winners) were unable to agree on a date for the match. The next edition took place in 1993 between the winners of the 1991 Copa América, Argentina, and the winners of UEFA Euro 1992, Denmark. Argentina hosted the match at the Estadio José María Minella in Mar del Plata, and won 5–4 on penalties following a 1–1 draw after extra time. The competition was discontinued thereafter.

Although the competition was discontinued after 1993, matches between the reigning champions of Europe and South America occasionally occurred outside the framework of the tournament. For example, in 20 December 1989, the winners of UEFA Euro 1988, the Netherlands, faced the 1989 Copa América champions, Brazil, in an international friendly played in De Kuip, Rotterdam, this game was won for Brazil 1–0. Other example took place in 25 March 1998, when UEFA Euro 1996 winners Germany hosted 1997 Copa América champions Brazil in an international friendly in Gottlieb-Daimler-Stadion, Stuttgart. Brazil won the match 2–1, ending Germany's 22-match unbeaten run.

The Artemio Franchi Cup can be considered a precursor of the King Fahd Cup/FIFA Confederations Cup, played in 1992 for the first time and organised by FIFA from its third edition in 1997. The competition featured title holders of the continental championships and FIFA World Cup. After the 2017 FIFA Confederations Cup, FIFA announced in March 2019 that the tournament would be abolished.

=== Relaunch as "Finalissima" ===
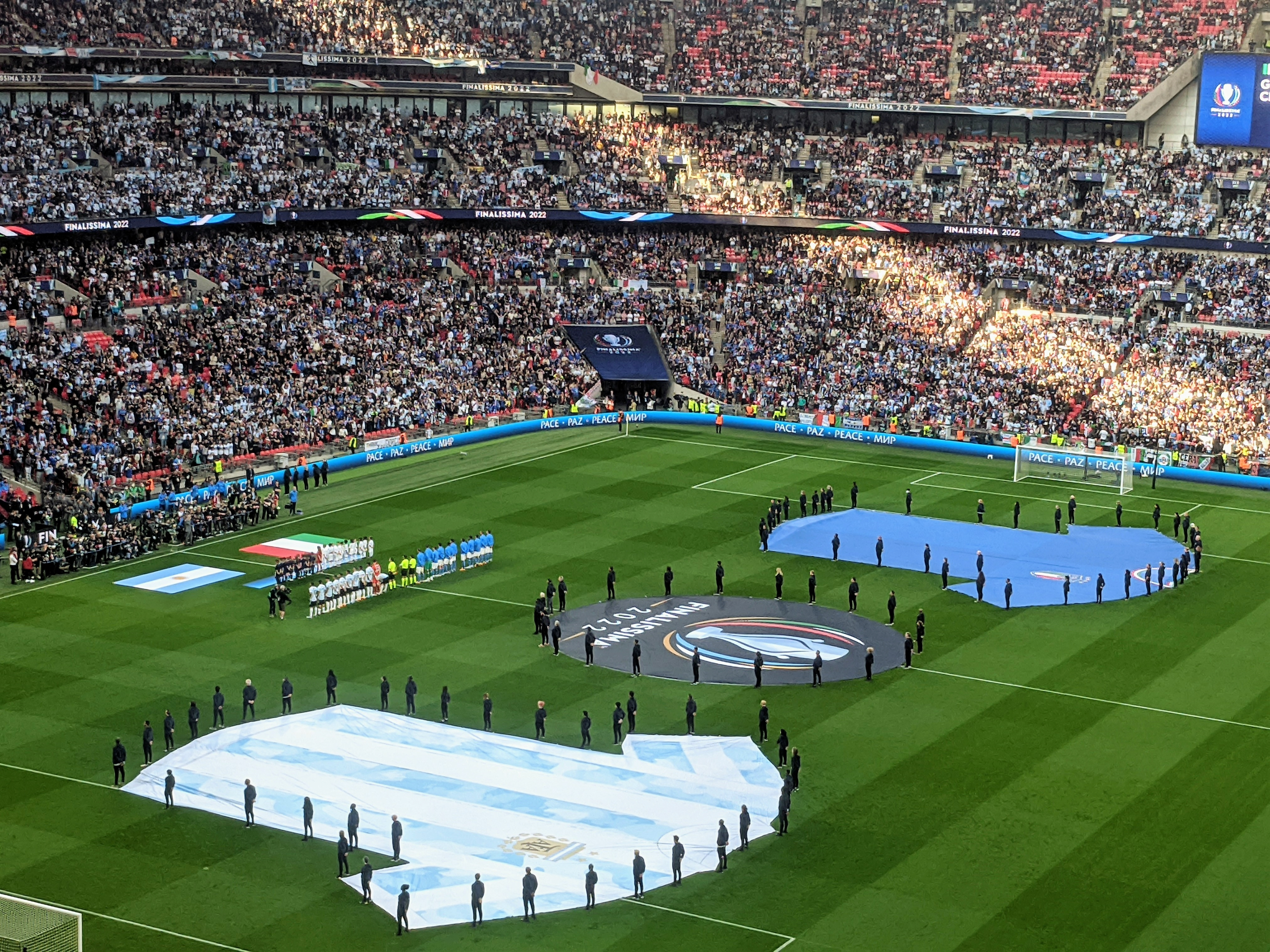
Pre match at the 2022 Finalissima

On 12 February 2020, UEFA and CONMEBOL signed a renewed memorandum of understanding meant to enhance cooperation between the two organisations. As part of the agreement, a joint UEFA–CONMEBOL committee examined the possibility of staging European–South American intercontinental matches, for both men's and women's football and across various age groups. On 28 September 2021, UEFA and CONMEBOL confirmed that the UEFA European Championship and Copa América winners would face each other in an intercontinental match, with the agreement initially covering three editions starting in 2022. On 15 December 2021, UEFA and CONMEBOL again signed a renewed memorandum of understanding lasting until 2028, which included specific provisions on opening a joint office in London and the potential organisation of various football events. On 22 March 2022, UEFA announced that the "CONMEBOL–UEFA Cup of Champions" would be the new name of the trophy for the Artemio Franchi Cup.

==== 2022 ====
The 2022 Finalissima took place between the winners of UEFA Euro 2020 (held in 2021), Italy, and the winners of the 2021 Copa América, Argentina, at Wembley Stadium in London, England. Argentina won the match 3–0 for their second title.

==== 2026 ====
Following the 2022 Finalissima, the next game was originally expected to take place in 2025, but extensive conflicts with other events led to its postponement. On 16 May 2025, both confederations confirmed that it would be contested between UEFA Euro 2024 winners Spain and 2024 Copa América winners Argentina, with the latter in their third consecutive appearance. Later in December of the same year, it was revealed that the match would be held at the Lusail Stadium, Qatar. Due to the Iranian attacks on Qatar as part of the 2026 Iran war, the 2026 edition was cancelled as both federations were not able to agree where else to play the match. However, the two would later meet for the 2026 FIFA World Cup final later in the year, in which Spain would go on to defeat Argentina 1–0.

== Results ==
List of Finalissima matches
Year	Winners	Score	Runners-up	Venue	Location	Attendance
Artemio Franchi Cup
1985	France	2–0	Uruguay	Parc des Princes	Paris, France	20,405
~~1989~~	Netherlands vs Uruguay: Did not take place as the teams were unable to agree on a date for the match.			—	—	—
1993	Argentina	1–1 (a.e.t.) (5–4 p)	Denmark	Estadio José María Minella	Mar del Plata, Argentina	34,683
Finalissima
2022	Argentina	3–0	Italy	Wembley Stadium	London, England	87,112
~~2026~~	Argentina vs Spain: Match cancelled due to the 2026 Iran war and the inability to reach an agreement to set another venue			Lusail Stadium	Lusail, Qatar	—

=== Results by nation ===
Results by nation
Team	Winners	Runners-up
Argentina	2 (1993, 2022)	—
France	1 (1985)	—
Uruguay	—	1 (1985)
Denmark	—	1 (1993)
Italy	—	1 (2022)

=== Results by confederation ===
Results by confederation
Confederation	Winners	Runners-up
CONMEBOL	2	1
UEFA	1	2

== Other matches between champions ==
List of matches between the CONMEBOL and UEFA champions
Year	Competition	Round	CONMEBOL champion	Score	UEFA champion	Venue	Location
(Chile) 1962	World Cup	Group stage	Uruguay	1–2	Soviet Union	Estadio Carlos Dittborn	Arica, Chile
(Mexico) 1970	World Cup	Group stage	Uruguay	0–0	Italy	Estadio Cuauhtémoc	Puebla, Mexico
(Netherlands) 1989	Friendly	N/A	Brazil	1–0	Netherlands	Stadion Feijenoord	Rotterdam, Netherlands
(Saudi Arabia) 1995	King Fahd Cup	Final	Argentina	0–2	Denmark	King Fahd II Stadium	Riyadh, Saudi Arabia
(Germany) 1998	Friendly	N/A	Brazil	2–1	Germany	Gottlieb-Daimler-Stadion	Stuttgart, Germany
(Mexico) 1999	Confederations Cup	Group stage	Brazil	4–0	Germany	Estadio Jalisco	Guadalajara, Mexico
(Japan) 2001	Confederations Cup	Semi-finals	Brazil	1–2	France	International Stadium Yokohama	Yokohama, Japan
(France) 2003	Confederations Cup	Group stage	Colombia	0–1	France	Stade de Gerland	Lyon, France
(Germany) 2005	Confederations Cup	Group stage	Brazil	3–0	Greece	Zentralstadion	Leipzig, Germany
(Brazil) 2013	Confederations Cup	Group stage	Uruguay	1–2	Spain	Itaipava Arena Pernambuco	Recife, Brazil
(Russia) 2017	Confederations Cup	Semi-finals	Chile	0–0 (a.e.t.) (3–0 p)	Portugal	Kazan Arena	Kazan, Russia
(Canada) (Mexico) (United States) 2026	World Cup	Final	Argentina	0–1 (a.e.t.)	Spain	MetLife Stadium	East Rutherford, United States

== Women's Finalissima ==
A women's equivalent, the Women's Finalissima between the winners of the UEFA Women's Championship and the Copa América Femenina, was also launched. Its first edition was played in 2023 at Wembley between UEFA Women's Euro 2022 winners England and 2022 Copa América Femenina winners Brazil.

== See also ==
- FIFA Confederations Cup
- AFC–OFC Challenge Cup
- Afro-Asian Cup of Nations
- Panamerican Championship
- UEFA–CONMEBOL MoU
  - Finalissima
  - Women's Finalissima
  - Futsal Finalissima
  - UEFA–CONMEBOL Club Challenge
  - Under-20 Intercontinental Cup
