= List of international goals scored by Lionel Messi =

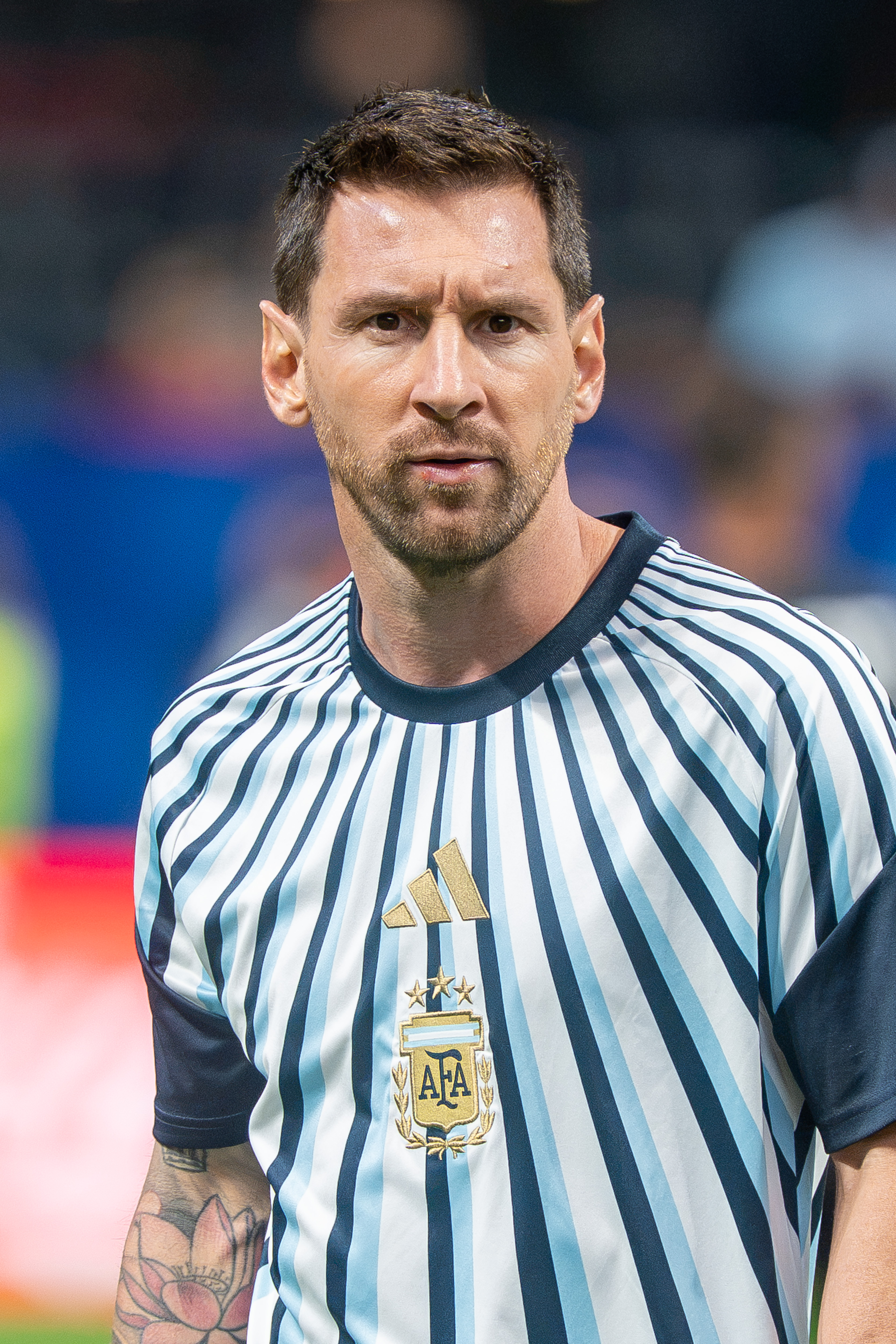
Messi (pictured in 2026) scored 126 international goals for Argentina between his debut in 2005 and his final appearance in 2026.

Lionel Messi is an Argentine footballer who represented the Argentina national team from 2005 to 2026. Throughout his international career, Messi scored 126 goals in 208 international appearances, making him the country's all-time top scorer; he surpassed Gabriel Batistuta's record of 54 goals with a free kick against the United States in the semi-final of the Copa América Centenario on 21 June 2016. He also holds the record for most goals by a South American male, surpassing Brazilian Pelé's 77 goals with a hat-trick against Bolivia on 9 September 2021. After scoring against Canada in the 2024 Copa América semi-final, he became the second-highest international men's goalscorer of all time, trailing only Cristiano Ronaldo.

Messi made his debut for Argentina in a 2–1 away win over Hungary on 17 August 2005, and scored his first international goal the following year in his sixth appearance, against Croatia. His goal against Serbia and Montenegro, on 16 June 2006, at the age of 18 years and 358 days, made him the youngest-ever scorer for Argentina at a FIFA World Cup. He scored 11 international hat-tricks, and netted twice in a match on 15 occasions. In a friendly against Estonia on 5 June 2022, Messi scored five goals in a match for Argentina for the first time. Out of all his opponents, Messi scored the most against Bolivia, recording 11 goals in total. He scored 20 international goals at the Estadio Monumental, his most in a single stadium. In 2022, Messi broke the record for the most international goals scored in a calendar year for Argentina, with 18. He made his 208th and final international appearance on 6 October 2026, a 3–0 friendly win against Benin in which he scored a penalty.

Messi scored 36 goals in FIFA World Cup qualifiers, making him the highest scorer of the qualification in CONMEBOL. He scored 14 goals in the Copa América: two in 2007, one in 2015, five in 2016, one in 2019, four in 2021 and one in 2024. Messi scored 21 goals in FIFA World Cup tournaments: one goal in 2006, four in 2014, one in 2018, seven in 2022 and another eight in 2026, making him the competition's second-highest scorer after Kylian Mbappé. The remainder of Messi's goals, 55, came in friendlies (official matches).

== Goals ==
Argentina score listed first, score column indicates score after each Messi goal

Table key
‡	Indicates goal was scored from a penalty kick
	Indicates Argentina won the match
	Indicates the match ended in a draw (a penalty shoot-out is recorded as a draw regardless of shoot-out results)
	Indicates Argentina lost the match

List of international goals scored by Lionel Messi
No.	Cap	Date	Venue	Opponent	Score	Result	Competition	Ref.
1	6	1 March 2006	St. Jakob-Park, Basel, Switzerland	Croatia	2–1	2–3	Friendly	
2	8	16 June 2006	Arena AufSchalke, Gelsenkirchen, Germany	Serbia and Montenegro	6–0	6–0	2006 FIFA World Cup	
3	14	5 June 2007	Camp Nou, Barcelona, Spain	Algeria	2–2‡	4–3	Friendly	
4	14	5 June 2007	Camp Nou, Barcelona, Spain	Algeria	4–2	4–3	Friendly	
5	18	8 July 2007	Estadio Metropolitano de Lara, Barquisimeto, Venezuela	Peru	2–0	4–0	2007 Copa América	
6	19	11 July 2007	Polideportivo Cachamay, Puerto Ordaz, Venezuela	Mexico	2–0	3–0	2007 Copa América	
7	24	16 October 2007	Estadio José Pachencho Romero, Maracaibo, Venezuela	Venezuela	2–0	2–0	2010 FIFA World Cup qualification	
8	26	20 November 2007	Estadio El Campín, Bogotá, Colombia	Colombia	1–0	1–2	2010 FIFA World Cup qualification	
9	27	4 June 2008	Qualcomm Stadium, San Diego, United States	Mexico	2–0	4–1	Friendly	
10	33	11 October 2008	Estadio Monumental, Buenos Aires, Argentina	Uruguay	1–0	2–1	2010 FIFA World Cup qualification	
11	35	11 February 2009	Stade Vélodrome, Marseille, France	France	2–0	2–0	Friendly	
12	36	28 March 2009	Estadio Monumental, Buenos Aires, Argentina	Venezuela	1–0	4–0	2010 FIFA World Cup qualification	
13	44	14 November 2009	Estadio Vicente Calderón, Madrid, Spain	Spain	1–1‡	1–2	Friendly	
14	52	7 September 2010	Estadio Monumental, Buenos Aires, Argentina	Spain	1–0	4–1	Friendly	
15	54	17 November 2010	Khalifa International Stadium, Doha, Qatar	Brazil	1–0	1–0	Friendly	
16	55	9 February 2011	Stade de Genève, Geneva, Switzerland	Portugal	2–1‡	2–1	Friendly	
17	57	20 June 2011	Estadio Monumental, Buenos Aires, Argentina	Albania	2–0	4–0	Friendly	
18	64	7 October 2011	Estadio Monumental, Buenos Aires, Argentina	Chile	2–0	4–1	2014 FIFA World Cup qualification	
19	67	15 November 2011	Estadio Metropolitano Roberto Meléndez, Barranquilla, Colombia	Colombia	1–1	2–1	2014 FIFA World Cup qualification	
20	68	29 February 2012	Stade de Suisse, Bern, Switzerland	Switzerland	1–0	3–1	Friendly	
21	68	29 February 2012	Stade de Suisse, Bern, Switzerland	Switzerland	2–1	3–1	Friendly	
22	68	29 February 2012	Stade de Suisse, Bern, Switzerland	Switzerland	3–1‡	3–1	Friendly	
23	69	2 June 2012	Estadio Monumental, Buenos Aires, Argentina	Ecuador	3–0	4–0	2014 FIFA World Cup qualification	
24	70	9 June 2012	MetLife Stadium, East Rutherford, United States	Brazil	1–1	4–3	Friendly	
25	70	9 June 2012	MetLife Stadium, East Rutherford, United States	Brazil	2–1	4–3	Friendly	
26	70	9 June 2012	MetLife Stadium, East Rutherford, United States	Brazil	4–3	4–3	Friendly	
27	71	15 August 2012	Waldstadion, Frankfurt, Germany	Germany	2–0	3–1	Friendly	
28	72	7 September 2012	Estadio Mario Alberto Kempes, Córdoba, Argentina	Paraguay	3–1	3–1	2014 FIFA World Cup qualification	
29	74	12 October 2012	Estadio Malvinas Argentinas, Mendoza, Argentina	Uruguay	1–0	3–0	2014 FIFA World Cup qualification	
30	74	12 October 2012	Estadio Malvinas Argentinas, Mendoza, Argentina	Uruguay	3–0	3–0	2014 FIFA World Cup qualification	
31	75	16 October 2012	Estadio Nacional Julio Martínez Prádanos, Santiago, Chile	Chile	1–0	2–1	2014 FIFA World Cup qualification	
32	78	22 March 2013	Estadio Monumental, Buenos Aires, Argentina	Venezuela	2–0‡	3–0	2014 FIFA World Cup qualification	
33	82	14 June 2013	Estadio Nacional Mateo Flores, Guatemala City, Guatemala	Guatemala	1–0	4–0	Friendly	
34	82	14 June 2013	Estadio Nacional Mateo Flores, Guatemala City, Guatemala	Guatemala	3–0‡	4–0	Friendly	
35	82	14 June 2013	Estadio Nacional Mateo Flores, Guatemala City, Guatemala	Guatemala	4–0	4–0	Friendly	
36	83	10 September 2013	Estadio Defensores del Chaco, Asunción, Paraguay	Paraguay	1–0‡	5–2	2014 FIFA World Cup qualification	
37	83	10 September 2013	Estadio Defensores del Chaco, Asunción, Paraguay	Paraguay	4–1‡	5–2	2014 FIFA World Cup qualification	
38	86	7 June 2014	Estadio Ciudad de La Plata, La Plata, Argentina	Slovenia	2–0	2–0	Friendly	
39	87	15 June 2014	Estádio do Maracanã, Rio de Janeiro, Brazil	Bosnia and Herzegovina	2–0	2–1	2014 FIFA World Cup	
40	88	21 June 2014	Estádio Mineirão, Belo Horizonte, Brazil	Iran	1–0	1–0	2014 FIFA World Cup	
41	89	25 June 2014	Estádio Beira-Rio, Porto Alegre, Brazil	Nigeria	1–0	3–2	2014 FIFA World Cup	
42	89	25 June 2014	Estádio Beira-Rio, Porto Alegre, Brazil	Nigeria	2–1	3–2	2014 FIFA World Cup	
43	95	14 October 2014	Hong Kong Stadium, So Kon Po, Hong Kong	Hong Kong	5–0	7–0	Friendly	
44	95	14 October 2014	Hong Kong Stadium, So Kon Po, Hong Kong	Hong Kong	7–0	7–0	Friendly	
45	96	12 November 2014	Upton Park, London, England	Croatia	2–1‡	2–1	Friendly	
46	98	13 June 2015	Estadio La Portada, La Serena, Chile	Paraguay	2–0‡	2–2	2015 Copa América	
47	104	4 September 2015	BBVA Compass Stadium, Houston, United States	Bolivia	5–0	7–0	Friendly	
48	104	4 September 2015	BBVA Compass Stadium, Houston, United States	Bolivia	6–0	7–0	Friendly	
49	105	8 September 2015	AT&T Stadium, Arlington, United States	Mexico	2–2	2–2	Friendly	
50	107	29 March 2016	Estadio Mario Alberto Kempes, Córdoba, Argentina	Bolivia	2–0‡	2–0	2018 FIFA World Cup qualification	
51	109	10 June 2016	Soldier Field, Chicago, United States	Panama	2–0	5–0	Copa América Centenario	
52	109	10 June 2016	Soldier Field, Chicago, United States	Panama	3–0	5–0	Copa América Centenario	
53	109	10 June 2016	Soldier Field, Chicago, United States	Panama	4–0	5–0	Copa América Centenario	
54	111	18 June 2016	Gillette Stadium, Foxborough, United States	Venezuela	3–0	4–1	Copa América Centenario	
55	112	21 June 2016	NRG Stadium, Houston, United States	United States	2–0	4–0	Copa América Centenario	
56	114	1 September 2016	Estadio Malvinas Argentinas, Mendoza, Argentina	Uruguay	1–0	1–0	2018 FIFA World Cup qualification	
57	116	15 November 2016	Estadio San Juan del Bicentenario, San Juan, Argentina	Colombia	1–0	3–0	2018 FIFA World Cup qualification	
58	117	23 March 2017	Estadio Monumental, Buenos Aires, Argentina	Chile	1–0‡	1–0	2018 FIFA World Cup qualification	
59	122	10 October 2017	Estadio Olímpico Atahualpa, Quito, Ecuador	Ecuador	1–1	3–1	2018 FIFA World Cup qualification	
60	122	10 October 2017	Estadio Olímpico Atahualpa, Quito, Ecuador	Ecuador	2–1	3–1	2018 FIFA World Cup qualification	
61	122	10 October 2017	Estadio Olímpico Atahualpa, Quito, Ecuador	Ecuador	3–1	3–1	2018 FIFA World Cup qualification	
62	124	29 May 2018	La Bombonera, Buenos Aires, Argentina	Haiti	1–0‡	4–0	Friendly	
63	124	29 May 2018	La Bombonera, Buenos Aires, Argentina	Haiti	2–0	4–0	Friendly	
64	124	29 May 2018	La Bombonera, Buenos Aires, Argentina	Haiti	3–0	4–0	Friendly	
65	127	26 June 2018	Krestovsky Stadium, Saint Petersburg, Russia	Nigeria	1–0	2–1	2018 FIFA World Cup	
66	130	7 June 2019	Estadio San Juan del Bicentenario, San Juan, Argentina	Nicaragua	1–0	5–1	Friendly	
67	130	7 June 2019	Estadio San Juan del Bicentenario, San Juan, Argentina	Nicaragua	2–0	5–1	Friendly	
68	132	19 June 2019	Estádio Mineirão, Belo Horizonte, Brazil	Paraguay	1–1‡	1–1	2019 Copa América	
69	137	15 November 2019	King Saud University Stadium, Riyadh, Saudi Arabia	Brazil	1–0	1–0	2019 Superclásico de las Américas	
70	138	18 November 2019	Bloomfield Stadium, Tel Aviv, Israel	Uruguay	2–2‡	2–2	Friendly	
71	139	8 October 2020	La Bombonera, Buenos Aires, Argentina	Ecuador	1–0‡	1–0	2022 FIFA World Cup qualification	
72	143	3 June 2021	Estadio Único Madre de Ciudades, Santiago del Estero, Argentina	Chile	1–0‡	1–1	2022 FIFA World Cup qualification	
73	145	14 June 2021	Estádio Olímpico Nilton Santos, Rio de Janeiro, Brazil	Chile	1–0	1–1	2021 Copa América	
74	148	28 June 2021	Arena Pantanal, Cuiabá, Brazil	Bolivia	2–0‡	4–1	2021 Copa América	
75	148	28 June 2021	Arena Pantanal, Cuiabá, Brazil	Bolivia	3–0	4–1	2021 Copa América	
76	149	3 July 2021	Estádio Olímpico Pedro Ludovico, Goiânia, Brazil	Ecuador	3–0	3–0	2021 Copa América	
77	153	9 September 2021	Estadio Monumental, Buenos Aires, Argentina	Bolivia	1–0	3–0	2022 FIFA World Cup qualification	
78	153	9 September 2021	Estadio Monumental, Buenos Aires, Argentina	Bolivia	2–0	3–0	2022 FIFA World Cup qualification	
79	153	9 September 2021	Estadio Monumental, Buenos Aires, Argentina	Bolivia	3–0	3–0	2022 FIFA World Cup qualification	
80	155	10 October 2021	Estadio Monumental, Buenos Aires, Argentina	Uruguay	1–0	3–0	2022 FIFA World Cup qualification	
81	159	25 March 2022	La Bombonera, Buenos Aires, Argentina	Venezuela	3–0	3–0	2022 FIFA World Cup qualification	
82	162	5 June 2022	Estadio El Sadar, Pamplona, Spain	Estonia	1–0‡	5–0	Friendly	
83	162	5 June 2022	Estadio El Sadar, Pamplona, Spain	Estonia	2–0	5–0	Friendly	
84	162	5 June 2022	Estadio El Sadar, Pamplona, Spain	Estonia	3–0	5–0	Friendly	
85	162	5 June 2022	Estadio El Sadar, Pamplona, Spain	Estonia	4–0	5–0	Friendly	
86	162	5 June 2022	Estadio El Sadar, Pamplona, Spain	Estonia	5–0	5–0	Friendly	
87	163	23 September 2022	Hard Rock Stadium, Miami Gardens, United States	Honduras	2–0‡	3–0	Friendly	
88	163	23 September 2022	Hard Rock Stadium, Miami Gardens, United States	Honduras	3–0	3–0	Friendly	
89	164	27 September 2022	Red Bull Arena, Harrison, United States	Jamaica	2–0	3–0	Friendly	
90	164	27 September 2022	Red Bull Arena, Harrison, United States	Jamaica	3–0	3–0	Friendly	
91	165	16 November 2022	Mohammed bin Zayed Stadium, Abu Dhabi, United Arab Emirates	United Arab Emirates	4–0	5–0	Friendly	
92	166	22 November 2022	Lusail Stadium, Lusail, Qatar	Saudi Arabia	1–0‡	1–2	2022 FIFA World Cup	
93	167	26 November 2022	Lusail Stadium, Lusail, Qatar	Mexico	1–0	2–0	2022 FIFA World Cup	
94	169	3 December 2022	Ahmad bin Ali Stadium, Al Rayyan, Qatar	Australia	1–0	2–1	2022 FIFA World Cup	
95	170	9 December 2022	Lusail Stadium, Lusail, Qatar	Netherlands	2–0‡	2–2 (a.e.t.) (4–3 p)	2022 FIFA World Cup	
96	171	13 December 2022	Lusail Stadium, Lusail, Qatar	Croatia	1–0‡	3–0	2022 FIFA World Cup	
97	172	18 December 2022	Lusail Stadium, Lusail, Qatar	France	1–0‡	3–3 (a.e.t.) (4–2 p)	2022 FIFA World Cup final	
98	172	18 December 2022	Lusail Stadium, Lusail, Qatar	France	3–2	3–3 (a.e.t.) (4–2 p)	2022 FIFA World Cup final	
99	173	23 March 2023	Estadio Monumental, Buenos Aires, Argentina	Panama	2–0	2–0	Friendly	
100	174	28 March 2023	Estadio Único Madre de Ciudades, Santiago del Estero, Argentina	Curaçao	1–0	7–0	Friendly	
101	174	28 March 2023	Estadio Único Madre de Ciudades, Santiago del Estero, Argentina	Curaçao	3–0	7–0	Friendly	
102	174	28 March 2023	Estadio Único Madre de Ciudades, Santiago del Estero, Argentina	Curaçao	5–0	7–0	Friendly	
103	175	15 June 2023	Workers' Stadium, Beijing, China	Australia	1–0	2–0	Friendly	
104	176	7 September 2023	Estadio Monumental, Buenos Aires, Argentina	Ecuador	1–0	1–0	2026 FIFA World Cup qualification	
105	178	17 October 2023	Estadio Nacional de Lima, Lima, Peru	Peru	1–0	2–0	2026 FIFA World Cup qualification	
106	178	17 October 2023	Estadio Nacional de Lima, Lima, Peru	Peru	2–0	2–0	2026 FIFA World Cup qualification	
107	182	14 June 2024	Commanders Field, Landover, United States	Guatemala	1–1	4–1	Friendly	
108	182	14 June 2024	Commanders Field, Landover, United States	Guatemala	4–1	4–1	Friendly	
109	186	9 July 2024	MetLife Stadium, East Rutherford, United States	Canada	2–0	2–0	2024 Copa América	
110	189	15 October 2024	Estadio Monumental, Buenos Aires, Argentina	Bolivia	1–0	6–0	2026 FIFA World Cup qualification	
111	189	15 October 2024	Estadio Monumental, Buenos Aires, Argentina	Bolivia	5–0	6–0	2026 FIFA World Cup qualification	
112	189	15 October 2024	Estadio Monumental, Buenos Aires, Argentina	Bolivia	6–0	6–0	2026 FIFA World Cup qualification	
113	194	4 September 2025	Estadio Monumental, Buenos Aires, Argentina	Venezuela	1–0	3–0	2026 FIFA World Cup qualification	
114	194	4 September 2025	Estadio Monumental, Buenos Aires, Argentina	Venezuela	3–0	3–0	2026 FIFA World Cup qualification	
115	196	14 November 2025	Estádio 11 de Novembro, Luanda, Angola	Angola	2–0	2–0	Friendly	
116	198	31 March 2026	La Bombonera, Buenos Aires, Argentina	Zambia	2–0	5–0	Friendly	
117	199	9 June 2026	Jordan–Hare Stadium, Auburn, United States	Iceland	2–0‡	3–0	Friendly	
118	200	16 June 2026	Arrowhead Stadium, Kansas City, United States	Algeria	1–0	3–0	2026 FIFA World Cup	
119	200	16 June 2026	Arrowhead Stadium, Kansas City, United States	Algeria	2–0	3–0	2026 FIFA World Cup	
120	200	16 June 2026	Arrowhead Stadium, Kansas City, United States	Algeria	3–0	3–0	2026 FIFA World Cup	
121	201	22 June 2026	AT&T Stadium, Arlington, United States	Austria	1–0	2–0	2026 FIFA World Cup	
122	201	22 June 2026	AT&T Stadium, Arlington, United States	Austria	2–0	2–0	2026 FIFA World Cup	
123	202	27 June 2026	AT&T Stadium, Arlington, United States	Jordan	3–1	3–1	2026 FIFA World Cup	
124	203	3 July 2026	Hard Rock Stadium, Miami Gardens, United States	Cape Verde	1–0	3–2 (a.e.t.)	2026 FIFA World Cup	
125	204	7 July 2026	Mercedes-Benz Stadium, Atlanta, United States	Egypt	2–2	3–2	2026 FIFA World Cup	
126	208	6 October 2026	Estadio Monumental, Buenos Aires, Argentina	Benin	3–0‡	3–0	Friendly	

== Hat-tricks ==
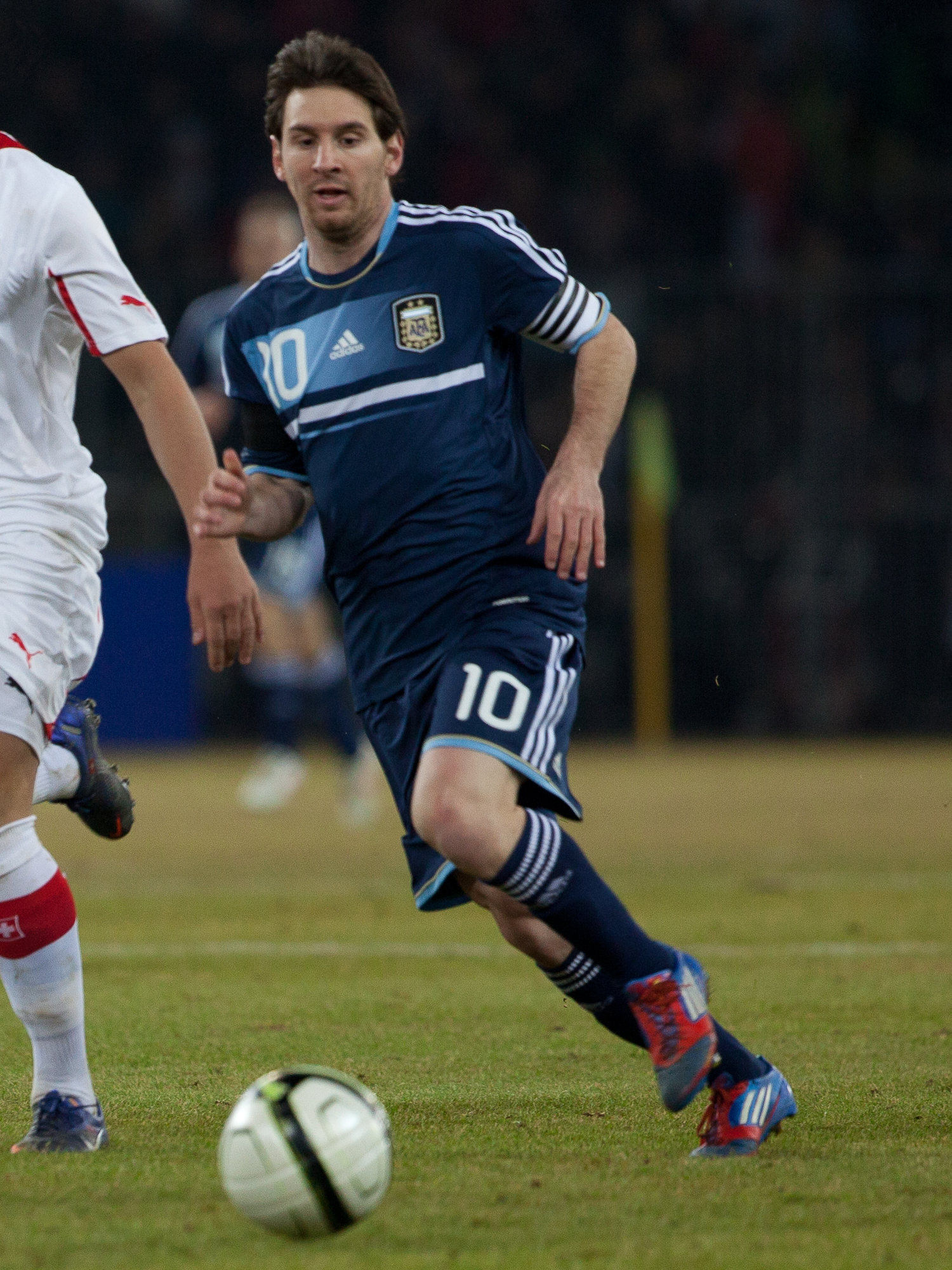
Messi scored his first international hat-trick against Switzerland on 29 February 2012.

No.	Opponent	Goals	Score	Venue	Competition	Date	Ref.
1	Switzerland	3 – (1–0', 2–1', 3–1')	3–1	Stade de Suisse, Bern, Switzerland	Friendly	29 February 2012	
2	Brazil	3 – (1–1', 2–1', 4–3')	4–3	MetLife Stadium, East Rutherford, United States	Friendly	9 June 2012	
3	Guatemala	3 – (1–0', 3–0', 4–0')	4–0	Estadio Nacional Mateo Flores, Guatemala City, Guatemala	Friendly	14 June 2013	
4	Panama	3 – (2–0', 3–0', 4–0')	5–0	Soldier Field, Chicago, United States	Copa América Centenario	10 June 2016	
5	Ecuador	3 – (1–1', 2–1', 3–1')	3–1	Estadio Olímpico Atahualpa, Quito, Ecuador	2018 FIFA World Cup qualification	10 October 2017	
6	Haiti	3 – (1–0', 2–0', 3–0')	4–0	La Bombonera, Buenos Aires, Argentina	Friendly	29 May 2018	
7	Bolivia	3 – (1–0', 2–0', 3–0')	3–0	Estadio Monumental, Buenos Aires, Argentina	2022 FIFA World Cup qualification	9 September 2021	
8	Estonia	5 – (1–0', 2–0', 3–0', 4–0', 5–0')	5–0	Estadio El Sadar, Pamplona, Spain	Friendly	5 June 2022	
9	Curaçao	3 – (1–0', 3–0', 5–0')	7–0	Estadio Único Madre de Ciudades, Santiago del Estero, Argentina	Friendly	28 March 2023	
10	Bolivia	3 – (1–0', 5–0', 6–0')	6–0	Estadio Monumental, Buenos Aires, Argentina	2026 FIFA World Cup qualification	15 October 2024	
11	Algeria	3 – (1–0', 2–0', 3–0')	3–0	Arrowhead Stadium, Kansas City, United States	2026 FIFA World Cup	16 June 2026	

== Statistics ==
Appearances and goals by year
Year	Competitive		Friendly		Total	
Year	Apps	Goals	Apps	Goals	Apps	Goals
2005	3 (Note: Appearances in 2006 FIFA World Cup qualification.)	0	2	0	5	0
2006	3 (Note: Appearances in 2006 FIFA World Cup.)	1	4	1	7	2
2007	10 (Note: Six appearances and two goals in 2007 Copa América, four appearances and two goals in 2010 FIFA World Cup qualification.)	4	4	2	14	6
2008	6 (Note: Appearances in 2010 FIFA World Cup qualification.)	1	2	1	8	2
2009	8	1	2	2	10	3
2010	5 (Note: Appearances in 2010 FIFA World Cup.)	0	5	2	10	2
2011	8 (Note: Four appearances in 2011 Copa América, four appearances and two goals in 2014 FIFA World Cup qualification.)	2	5	2	13	4
2012	5 (Note: Appearances in 2014 FIFA World Cup qualification.)	5	4	7	9	12
2013	5	3	2	3	7	6
2014	7 (Note: Appearances in 2014 FIFA World Cup.)	4	7	4	14	8
2015	6 (Note: Appearances in 2015 Copa América.)	1	2	3	8	4
2016	10 (Note: Five appearances and three goals in 2018 FIFA World Cup qualification, five appearances and five goals in Copa América Centenario.)	8	1	0	11	8
2017	5 (Note: Appearances in 2018 FIFA World Cup qualification.)	4	2	0	7	4
2018	4 (Note: Appearances in 2018 FIFA World Cup.)	1	1	3	5	4
2019	6 (Note: Appearances in 2019 Copa América.)	1	4	4	10	5
2020	4 (Note: Appearances in 2022 FIFA World Cup qualification.)	1	—		4	1
2021	16 (Note: Nine appearances and five goals in 2022 FIFA World Cup qualification, seven appearances and four goals in 2021 Copa América.)	9	—		16	9
2022	10 (Note: Two appearances and one goal in 2022 FIFA World Cup qualification, one appearance in 2022 Finalissima, seven appearances and seven goals in 2022 FIFA World Cup.)	8	4	10	14	18
2023	5 (Note: Appearances in 2026 FIFA World Cup qualification.)	3	3	5	8	8
2024	9 (Note: Five appearances and one goal in 2024 Copa América, four appearances and three goals in 2026 FIFA World Cup qualification.)	4	2	2	11	6
2025	3	2	2	1	5	3
2026	8 (Note: Appearances in 2026 FIFA World Cup.)	8	4	3	12	11
Total	146	71	62	55	208	126

Appearances and goals by competition
Competition	Apps	Goals
Friendlies	62	55
FIFA World Cup qualifiers	72	36
FIFA World Cup	34	21
Copa América	39	14
Finalissima	1	0
Total	208	126

Goals by confederation
Confederation	Teams	Goals
CONMEBOL	9	52
CONCACAF	10	27
UEFA	14	26
CAF	7	13
AFC	6	8
Total	46	126

Goals by opponent
Opponent	Goals
Bolivia	11
Ecuador	7
Venezuela	7
Uruguay	6
Algeria	5
Brazil	5
Chile	5
Estonia	5
Guatemala	5
Paraguay	5
Mexico	4
Panama	4
Colombia	3
Croatia	3
Curaçao	3
France	3
Haiti	3
Nigeria	3
Peru	3
Switzerland	3
Australia	2
Austria	2
Honduras	2
Hong Kong	2
Jamaica	2
Nicaragua	2
Spain	2
Albania	1
Angola	1
Benin	1
Bosnia and Herzegovina	1
Canada	1
Cape Verde	1
Egypt	1
Germany	1
Iceland	1
Iran	1
Jordan	1
Netherlands	1
Portugal	1
Saudi Arabia	1
Serbia and Montenegro	1
Slovenia	1
United Arab Emirates	1
United States	1
Zambia	1
Total	126

== See also ==
- List of top international men's football goalscorers by country
- List of men's footballers with 100 or more international caps
- List of men's footballers with 50 or more international goals
- List of international goals scored by Alfredo Di Stéfano
- List of footballers with the most goals in a single game
- List of international goals scored by Gabriel Batistuta
- List of international goals scored by Diego Maradona
- List of Argentina national football team hat-tricks
- List of career achievements by Lionel Messi
- List of footballers with 500 or more goals
- Lists of hat-tricks
