= Vamos, vamos, Argentina =

Chant

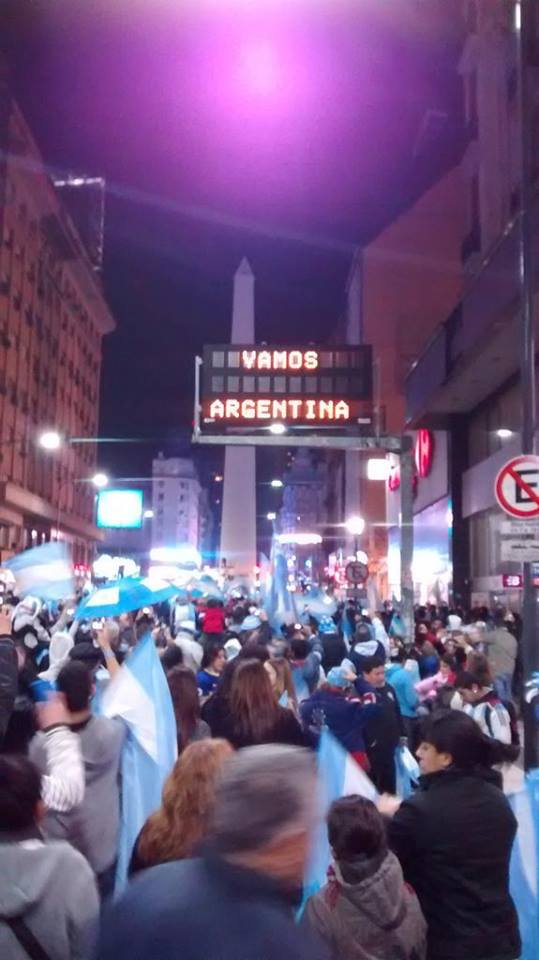
Argentine fans cheering near the Obelisco after the men's national team qualified to the 2014 FIFA World Cup final.

"Vamos, vamos, Argentina" (pronounced [ˈbamos ˈbamos aɾxenˈtina]) is an Argentinian chant, used by supporters in sports events, mainly in football matches of the national team and related celebrations.

== Background ==
The song has its origin in a political campaign launched by the government in 1974 with a slogan "Argentina potencia" ("Argentina power") and a song called "Contagiate Mi Alegría" written by Fernando Sustaita and Ernesto Olivera. Fans of football clubs such as Boca Juniors adapted the song as football chants, and it was then turned into "Vamos, vamos, Argentina" with different lyrics. The song was recorded for the 1978 World Cup held in Argentina, and became highly popular.

=== Legal disputes ===
The attribution of the song became a tangled issue as Sustaita and Olivera were not credited as the songwriters in the released recordings, instead in some versions the authors were credited as Nemara (Néstor Rama) and Rimasi, in others Rama and Julio Fontana, while Juan Carlos Zaraik Goulu and Néstor Rama were registered as the authors of the song. Sustaita and Olivera then complained of plagiarism, and a settlement was reached whereby Sustaita was given the credit as composer, with Olivera and Zaraik Goulu the lyricists.

The issue was further complicated by the existence of a different song written by Enrique Núñez and Roque Mellace in 1977 that has the same title of "Vamos, vamos, Argentina". Núñez and Mellace claimed royalties for the song despite the two songs being entirely different apart from the first two lines (Vamos, vamos Argentina / vamos, vamos a ganar). In August 2007, the civil court controversially found in favour of Núñez and Mellace and ordered that royalties be paid to the pair.

== Lyrics ==
Spanish original

Vamos, vamos Argentina,
vamos, vamos a ganar,
que esta banda quilombera,
no te deja, no te deja de alentar.

IPA transcription

[ˈbamos ˈbamos aɾxenˈtina]
[ˈbamos ˈbamos a ɡaˈnaɾ]
[ke ˈesta ˈbara kiˈlom.beˈɾa]
[no ˈte ˈde.xa no ˈte ˈde.xa de alenˈtaɾ]

English translation

Let's go, let's go Argentina,
We're going, we're going to win,
that this quilombera band,
won't stop, won't stop cheering you.

The adjective quilombera used in the third line is a mildly vulgar term. In the lunfardo argot, quilombo means "bedlam" or "mess". In this case, quilombera is used to describe the fact that football fans make a lot of noise and usually a mess of throwing confetti when goals are scored. On older recordings when profanity was not tolerated, quilombera was replaced by bullanguera ("rackety").

This chant unites all of Argentina's supporters regardless of their club allegiance. It is the signature first song attempted by Argentine expatriates when the national team visits a foreign country. Usage has spread to basketball and volleyball teams, but not to the Los Pumas rugby union team (normally they use Yo te daré, te daré una cosa -I will give you/I will give you a thing-).

The other most popular chant among Argentine fans is Es un sentimiento ... no puedo parar ( English: It's a feeling ... I can't stop [cheering])
