= List of international goals scored by Gabriel Batistuta =

Gabriel Batistuta is an Argentine former professional footballer who made 78 appearances for Argentina between 1991 and 2002.

He is Argentina's second highest goalscorer, behind only Lionel Messi, with 56 goals in 78 international matches.

== International goals ==
Scores and results list Argentina's goal tally first, score column indicates score after each Batistuta goal.

List of international goals scored by Gabriel Batistuta
No.	Cap	Date	Venue	Opponent	Score	Result	Competition	Ref.
1	2	8 July 1991	Estadio Nacional, Santiago, Chile	Venezuela	1–0	3–0	1991 Copa América	
2	2	8 July 1991	Estadio Nacional, Santiago, Chile	Venezuela	3–0	3–0	1991 Copa América	
3	3	10 July 1991	Estadio Nacional, Santiago, Chile	Chile	1–0	1–0	1991 Copa América	
4	4	12 July 1991	Estadio Municipal, Concepción, Chile	Paraguay	1–0	4–1	1991 Copa América	
5	5	17 July 1991	Estadio Nacional, Santiago, Chile	Brazil	3–1	3–2	1991 Copa América	
6	7	21 July 1991	Estadio Nacional, Santiago, Chile	Colombia	2–0	2–1	1991 Copa América	
7	8	30 May 1992	National Stadium, Tokyo, Japan	Japan	1–0	1–0	1992 Kirin Cup	
8	9	3 June 1992	Gifu Nagaragawa Stadium, Gifu, Japan	Wales	1–0	1–0	1992 Kirin Cup	
9	10	18 June 1992	Estadio Monumental, Buenos Aires, Argentina	Australia	1–0	2–0	Friendly	
10	10	18 June 1992	Estadio Monumental, Buenos Aires, Argentina	Australia	2–0	2–0	Friendly	
11	11	16 October 1992	King Fahd International Stadium, Riyadh, Saudi Arabia	Ivory Coast	1–0	4–0	1992 King Fahd Cup	
12	11	16 October 1992	King Fahd International Stadium, Riyadh, Saudi Arabia	Ivory Coast	2–0	4–0	1992 King Fahd Cup	
13	15	17 June 1993	Estadio George Capwell, Guayaquil, Ecuador	Bolivia	1–0	1–0	1993 Copa América	
14	20	4 July 1993	Estadio Monumental, Guayaquil, Ecuador	Mexico	1–0	2–1	1993 Copa América	
15	20	4 July 1993	Estadio Monumental, Guayaquil, Ecuador	Mexico	2–1	2–1	1993 Copa América	
16	21	1 August 1993	National Stadium of Peru, Lima, Peru	Peru	1–0	1–0	1994 FIFA World Cup qualification	
17	23	22 August 1993	Estadio Monumental, Buenos Aires, Argentina	Peru	1–0	2–1	1994 FIFA World Cup qualification	
18	27	17 November 1993	Estadio Monumental, Buenos Aires, Argentina	Australia	1–0 (Note: Other sources attribute this goal as an own goal scored by Alex Tobin)	1–0	1994 FIFA World Cup qualification	
19	32	31 May 1994	Ramat Gan Stadium, Ramat Gan, Israel	Israel	1–0	3–0	Friendly	
20	32	31 May 1994	Ramat Gan Stadium, Ramat Gan, Israel	Israel	2–0	3–0	Friendly	
21	34	21 June 1994	Foxboro Stadium, Foxborough, United States	Greece	1–0	4–0	1994 FIFA World Cup	
22	34	21 June 1994	Foxboro Stadium, Foxborough, United States	Greece	2–0	4–0	1994 FIFA World Cup	
23	34	21 June 1994	Foxboro Stadium, Foxborough, United States	Greece	4–0	4–0	1994 FIFA World Cup	
24	37	3 July 1994	Rose Bowl, Pasadena, United States	Romania	1–1	2–3	1994 FIFA World Cup	
25	38	8 January 1995	King Fahd International Stadium, Riyadh, Saudi Arabia	Japan	3–0	5–1	1995 King Fahd Cup	
26	38	8 January 1995	King Fahd International Stadium, Riyadh, Saudi Arabia	Japan	5–1	5–1	1995 King Fahd Cup	
27	41	22 June 1995	Estadio Malvinas Argentinas, Mendoza, Argentina	Slovakia	3–0	6–0	Friendly	
28	41	22 June 1995	Estadio Malvinas Argentinas, Mendoza, Argentina	Slovakia	6–0	6–0	Friendly	
29	42	30 June 1995	Estadio Centenario Ciudad de Quilmes, Quilmes, Argentina	Australia	2–0	2–0	Friendly	
30	43	8 July 1995	Estadio Parque Artigas, Paysandú, Uruguay	Bolivia	1–0	2–1	1995 Copa América	
31	44	11 July 1995	Estadio Parque Artigas, Paysandú, Uruguay	Chile	1–0	4–0	1995 Copa América	
32	44	11 July 1995	Estadio Parque Artigas, Paysandú, Uruguay	Chile	3–0	4–0	1995 Copa América	
33	46	17 July 1995	Estadio Atilio Paiva Olivera, Rivera, Uruguay	Brazil	2–1	2–2 (2–4 p)	1995 Copa América	
34	49	24 April 1996	Estadio Monumental, Buenos Aires, Argentina	Bolivia	3–1	3–1	1998 FIFA World Cup qualification	
35	51	1 September 1996	Estadio Monumental, Buenos Aires, Argentina	Paraguay	1–0	1–1	1998 FIFA World Cup qualification	
36	53	15 December 1996	Estadio Monumental, Buenos Aires, Argentina	Chile	1–1	1–1	1998 FIFA World Cup qualification	
37	56	10 March 1998	José Amalfitani Stadium, Buenos Aires, Argentina	Bulgaria	1–0	2–0	Friendly	
38	58	22 April 1998	Lansdowne Road, Dublin, Ireland	Republic of Ireland	1–0	2–0	Friendly	
39	60	14 May 1998	Estadio Córdoba, Córdoba, Argentina	Bosnia and Herzegovina	1–0	5–0	Friendly	
40	60	14 May 1998	Estadio Córdoba, Córdoba, Argentina	Bosnia and Herzegovina	2–0	5–0	Friendly	
41	60	14 May 1998	Estadio Córdoba, Córdoba, Argentina	Bosnia and Herzegovina	5–0	5–0	Friendly	
42	61	19 May 1998	Estadio Malvinas Argentinas, Mendoza, Argentina	Chile	1–0	1–0	Friendly	
43	62	25 May 1998	Estadio Monumental, Buenos Aires, Argentina	South Africa	1–0	2–0	Friendly	
44	63	14 June 1998	Stadium de Toulouse, Toulouse, France	Japan	1–0	1–0	1998 FIFA World Cup	
45	64	21 June 1998	Parc des Princes, Paris, France	Jamaica	3–0	5–0	1998 FIFA World Cup	
46	64	21 June 1998	Parc des Princes, Paris, France	Jamaica	4–0	5–0	1998 FIFA World Cup	
47	64	21 June 1998	Parc des Princes, Paris, France	Jamaica	5–0	5–0	1998 FIFA World Cup	
48	66	30 June 1998	Stade Geoffroy-Guichard, Saint-Étienne, France	England	1–0	2–2 (4–3 p)	1998 FIFA World Cup	
49	68	31 March 1999	Amsterdam ArenA, Amsterdam, Netherlands	Netherlands	1–1	1–1	Friendly	
50	69	13 October 1999	Estadio Córdoba, Córdoba, Argentina	Colombia	1–0	2–1	Friendly	
51	71	29 March 2000	Estadio Monumental, Buenos Aires, Argentina	Chile	1–0	4–1	2002 FIFA World Cup qualification	
52	73	29 June 2000	Estadio El Campín, Bogotá, Colombia	Colombia	1–0	3–1	2002 FIFA World Cup qualification	
53	73	29 June 2000	Estadio El Campín, Bogotá, Colombia	Colombia	2–1	3–1	2002 FIFA World Cup qualification	
54	74	8 October 2000	Estadio Monumental, Buenos Aires, Argentina	Uruguay	2–0	2–1	2002 FIFA World Cup qualification	
55	75	7 October 2001	Estadio Defensores del Chaco, Asunción, Paraguay	Paraguay	2–2	2–2	2002 FIFA World Cup qualification	
56	76	2 June 2002	Kashima Soccer Stadium, Kashima, Japan	Nigeria	1–0	1–0	2002 FIFA World Cup	

== Hat-tricks ==
No.	Date	Venue	Opponent	Goals	Result	Competition	Ref.
1	21 June 1994	Foxboro Stadium, Foxborough, United States	Greece	3 – (1', 44', 89' pen.)	4–0	1994 FIFA World Cup	
2	14 May 1998	Estadio Córdoba, Córdoba, Argentina	Bosnia and Herzegovina	3 – (6', 24', 80')	5–0	Friendly	
3	21 June 1998	Parc des Princes, Paris, France	Jamaica	3 – (73', 79', 83' pen.)	5–0	1998 FIFA World Cup	

== Statistics ==
Appearances and goals by year
Year	Apps	Goals
1991	7	6
1992	5	6
1993	15	6
1994	10	6
1995	11	9
1996	5	3
1997	2	0
1998	12	12
1999	2	2
2000	5	4
2001	1	1
2002	3	1
Total	78	56

Goals by competition
Competition	Goals
FIFA World Cup qualification	11
Friendlies	18
Copa América	13
FIFA World Cup	10
King Fahd Cup	4
Total	56

Goals by opponent
Opponent	Goals
Chile	6
Australia	4
Colombia	4
Japan	4
Bolivia	3
Bosnia and Herzegovina	3
Greece	3
Jamaica	3
Paraguay	3
Peru	3
Brazil	2
Israel	2
Ivory Coast	2
Mexico	2
Slovakia	2
Venezuela	2
Bulgaria	1
England	1
Netherlands	1
Nigeria	1
Republic of Ireland	1
Romania	1
South Africa	1
Uruguay	1
Wales	1
Total	56
