= Argentina national football team =

Men's association football team

Argentina
- Nickname(s): La Selección (The National Team); La Albiceleste (The White and Sky Blue); La Scaloneta (Scaloni's Van)
- Association: Asociación del Fútbol Argentino (AFA)
- Confederation: CONMEBOL (South America)
- Head coach: Lionel Scaloni
- Captain: Cristian Romero
- Most caps: Lionel Messi (208)
- Top scorer: Lionel Messi (126)
- Home stadium: Various
- FIFA code: ARG
First colours	Second colours

FIFA ranking
- Current: 2 (18 November 2026)
- Highest: 1 (Note: March 2007; October 2007 – June 2008; July 2015 – October 2015; April 2016 – March 2017; April 2023 – July 2025; June 2026 – July 2026)
- Lowest: 24 (August 1996)

First international
- Uruguay 0–6 Argentina (Montevideo, Uruguay; 20 July 1902) (Note: Attributed to multiple references:)

Biggest win
- Argentina 12–0 Ecuador (Montevideo, Uruguay; 22 January 1942)

Biggest defeat
- Czechoslovakia 6–1 Argentina (Helsingborg, Sweden; 15 June 1958), Colombia 5–0 Argentina (Buenos Aires, Argentina; 5 September 1993); Bolivia 6–1 Argentina (La Paz, Bolivia; 1 April 2009); Spain 6–1 Argentina (Madrid, Spain; 27 March 2018)

World Cup
- Appearances: 19 (first in 1930 )
- Best result: Champions (1978, 1986, 2022)

Copa América
- Appearances: 44 (first in 1916 )
- Best result: Champions (1921, 1925, 1927, 1929, 1937, 1941, 1945, 1946, 1947, 1955, 1957, 1959, 1991, 1993, 2021, 2024)

Panamerican Championship
- Appearances: 2 (first in 1956 )
- Best result: Champions (1960)

CONMEBOL–UEFA Cup of Champions
- Appearances: 3 (first in 1993 )
- Best result: Champions (1993, 2022)

Olympic Games
- Appearances: 4 (first in 1928)
- Best result: Runners-up (1928)

Confederations Cup
- Appearances: 3 (first in 1992 )
- Best result: Champions (1992)
Medal record
Men's football
World Cup
Gold medal – first place	1978 Argentina	Team
Gold medal – first place	1986 Mexico	Team
Gold medal – first place	2022 Qatar	Team
Silver medal – second place	1930 Uruguay	Team
Silver medal – second place	1990 Italy	Team
Silver medal – second place	2014 Brazil	Team
Silver medal – second place	2026 Canada–Mexico–US	Team
Confederations Cup
Gold medal – first place	1992 Saudi Arabia	Team
Silver medal – second place	1995 Saudi Arabia	Team
Silver medal – second place	2005 Germany	Team
Olympic Games (Note: Argentina's Olympic Silver has equal value to a World Cup runner-up finish. Only the 1924 and 1928 editions are senior world titles equivalent to a World Cup. After the World Cup was established, football at the Olympics became amateur players only, like it was prior to 1924. Since the 1992 edition, the tournament was restricted to squads with no more than 3 players over the age of 23, and these matches are not regarded as part of the senior national team's record, nor are senior national team caps awarded, it’s part of the Argentina U23.)
Silver medal – second place	1928 Netherlands	Team
Copa América
Gold medal – first place	1921 Argentina	Team
Gold medal – first place	1925 Argentina	Team
Gold medal – first place	1927 Peru	Team
Gold medal – first place	1929 Argentina	Team
Gold medal – first place	1937 Argentina	Team
Gold medal – first place	1941 Chile	Team
Gold medal – first place	1945 Chile	Team
Gold medal – first place	1946 Argentina	Team
Gold medal – first place	1947 Ecuador	Team
Gold medal – first place	1955 Chile	Team
Gold medal – first place	1957 Peru	Team
Gold medal – first place	1959 Argentina	Team
Gold medal – first place	1991 Chile	Team
Gold medal – first place	1993 Ecuador	Team
Gold medal – first place	2021 Brazil	Team
Gold medal – first place	2024 United States	Team
Silver medal – second place	1916 Argentina	Team
Silver medal – second place	1917 Uruguay	Team
Silver medal – second place	1920 Chile	Team
Silver medal – second place	1923 Uruguay	Team
Silver medal – second place	1924 Uruguay	Team
Silver medal – second place	1926 Chile	Team
Silver medal – second place	1935 Peru	Team
Silver medal – second place	1942 Uruguay	Team
Silver medal – second place	1959 Ecuador	Team
Silver medal – second place	1967 Uruguay	Team
Silver medal – second place	2004 Peru	Team
Silver medal – second place	2007 Venezuela	Team
Silver medal – second place	2015 Chile	Team
Silver medal – second place	2016 United States	Team
Bronze medal – third place	1919 Brazil	Team
Bronze medal – third place	1956 Uruguay	Team
Bronze medal – third place	1963 Bolivia	Team
Bronze medal – third place	1989 Brazil	Team
Bronze medal – third place	2019 Brazil	Team
Panamerican Championship
Gold medal – first place	1960 Costa Rica	Team
Silver medal – second place	1956 Mexico	Team
CONMEBOL–UEFA Cup of Champions
Gold medal – first place	1993 Argentina	Team
Gold medal – first place	2022 England	Team
- Website: afa.com.ar/seleccion-mayor

The Argentina national football team, (Note: Spanish: Selección de fútbol de Argentina) nicknamed la Albiceleste, (Note: English: The White and Sky Blue) represents Argentina in men's international football and is administered by the Argentine Football Association, the governing body of football in Argentina. It has been a member of FIFA since 1912 and was a founding member of CONMEBOL in 1916. It was also a member of PFC, the unified confederation of the Americas, from 1946 to 1961. Argentina has won three FIFA World Cups, in 1978, 1986 and 2022. The team has appeared in seven World Cup finals, including the inaugural one in 1930.

Argentina has won the Copa América a record 16 times, most recently in 2024. With victories in 1945, 1946 and 1947, it is the only nation to have won the tournament three consecutive times. Argentina won the Panamerican Championship in 1960, the inaugural FIFA Confederations Cup in 1992, and the CONMEBOL–UEFA Cup of Champions in 1993 and 2022. Argentina holds the record for most official international titles, with 23. (Note: Attributed to multiple references:) Argentina players have won the FIFA World Cup Golden Ball three times: Diego Maradona in 1986, and Lionel Messi in 2014 and 2022. Messi has the most appearances for the team (208) and has scored the most goals (126). As of 18 November 2026, Argentina ranks second in the FIFA Men's World Ranking. Argentina is known for having rivalries with Brazil, England, Germany, Netherlands, and Uruguay.

== History ==
The first ever match Argentina played was against Uruguay on June 20, 1902, in Montevideo. (Note: There is a precedent of a match played between an Argentine representative against an Uruguayan side, on 16 May 1901, in Paso del Molino. Nevertheless, most historians discard this match as the first, stating that match was not organised by the AUF but by Albion F.C.. In fact, the initial line-up featured nine players from Albion and two from Nacional.) It was the first international match for both sides, and Argentina won 6–0. During the first years of Argentina's existence, the team only played friendly matches against other South American teams. The reasons for this varied, including long travel times between countries and the outbreak of World War I.

Argentina has appeared in the FIFA World Cup final seven times, including the first ever final on 30 July 1930, which they lost 4–2 to Uruguay. Argentina won their next final on 25 June 1978, beating the Netherlands 3–1 on extra time. In 1986, Diego Maradona led Argentina to their second title with a 3–2 victory over West Germany. Maradona led Argentina to the final again in 1990, but the team lost 1–0 to West Germany by a much-disputed penalty. With Lionel Messi as captain, Argentina reached the final in 2014, where they were defeated 1–0 by Germany in extra time. Argentina won their third FIFA World Cup in 2022 by defeating France in a penalty shoot-out, after a 3–3 draw. In the 2026 World Cup, Argentina reached the final again but lost 1–0 to Spain, finishing as runners-up. This match was very controversial as many football fans deemed the Argentine team's behavior after losing the game to be unprofessional. Argentina's World Cup-winning managers are César Luis Menotti (1978), Carlos Bilardo (1986) and Lionel Scaloni (2022).

Argentina has won the Copa América a record 16 times, most recently in 2024. The team also won the inaugural FIFA Confederations Cup in 1992 and the CONMEBOL–UEFA Cup of Champions in 1993 and 2022. In March 2007, Argentina reached the top of the FIFA Men's World Ranking for the first time.

== Stadiums ==
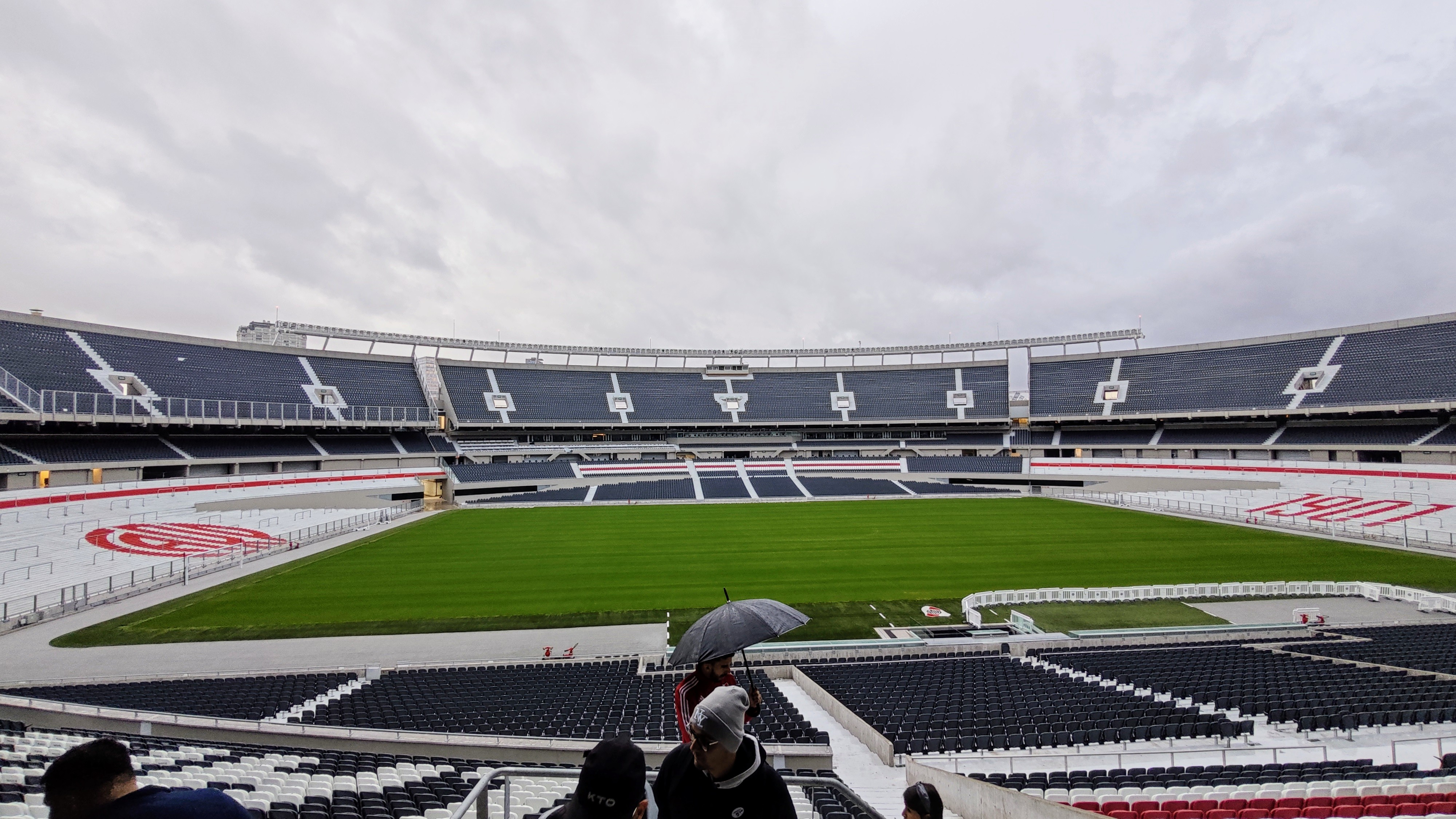
Estadio Monumental, Argentina's most frequent home venue

Argentina plays most of its home matches at Estadio Monumental, the stadium of Club Atlético River Plate in Buenos Aires. The team frequently uses other venues as well, including Estadio Único Madre de Ciudades and La Bombonera.

Estadio GEBA was the first stadium Argentina used for home matches, including the Copa Newton match against Uruguay on 13 September 1908. The 1908 match marked the official debut of Argentina's white and light blue striped jersey, which has been the team's defining uniform up to the present day. GEBA was also used for the Copa Centenario Revolución de Mayo, which was organized by the Argentine Football Association (AFA) in 1910. It was the first competition between South American national teams, and is considered the predecessor of the Copa América.

Estadio Sportivo Barracas was often used by Argentina from 1920 to 1932. Playing in the stadium on 2 October 1924, Argentina forward Cesáreo Onzari scored directly from a corner kick, the first reported instance of this feat in football. Because Uruguay had recently won the gold medal at the 1924 Olympics, this type of goal is now often referred to as an Olimpico. (Note: Attributed to multiple references:)

== Team image ==
=== Kit ===
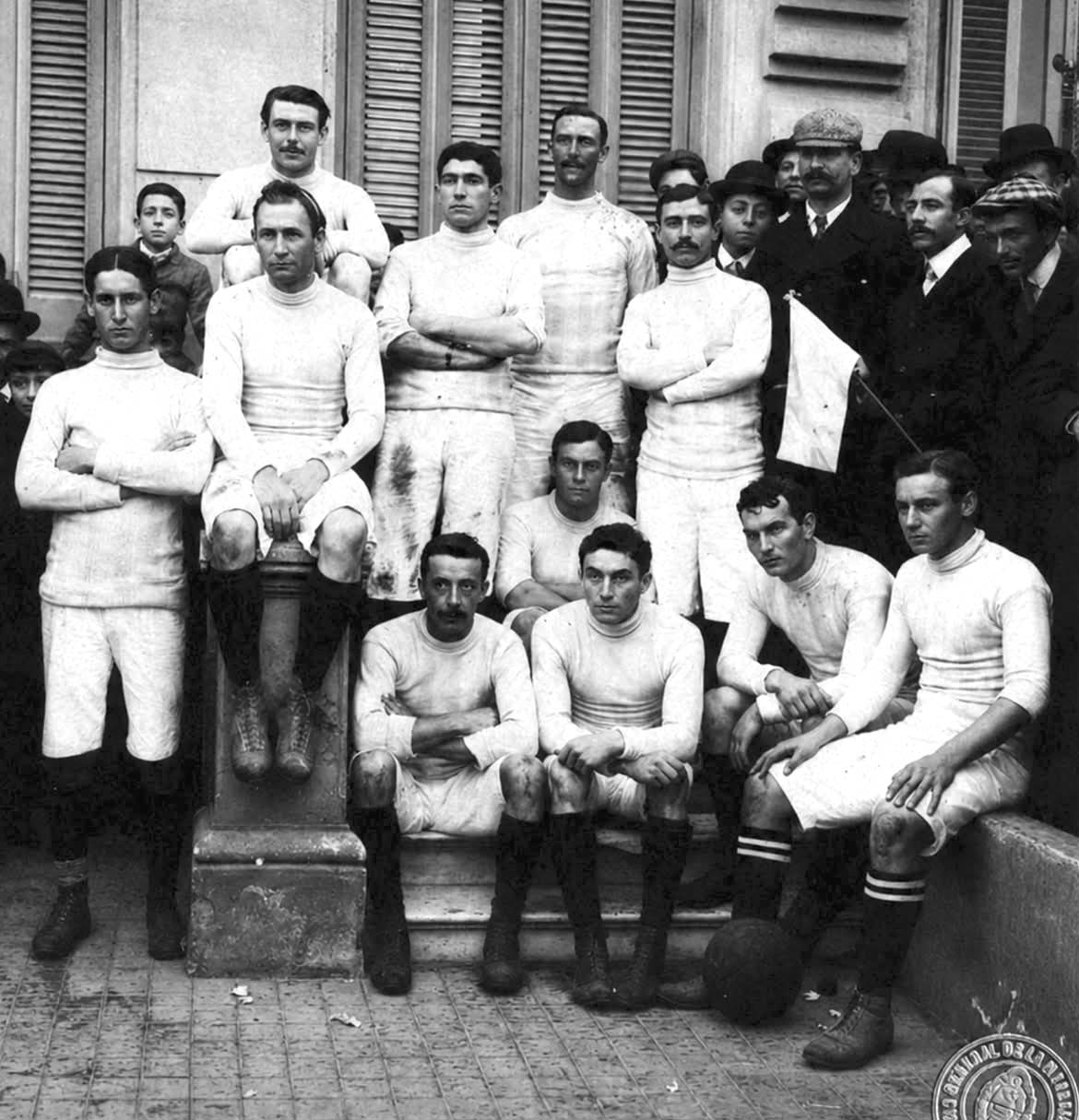
The classic light blue and white-striped jersey first worn on 9 July 1906 in Buenos Aires

The first kit ever worn by Argentina, in their official debut against Uruguay in 1902, included a light blue shirt.

On 9 July 1906, Argentina wore the lightblue and white shirt for the first time in a match v South Africa during their tour of South America. The match was held in Sociedad Sportiva Argentina. Since then, the albiceleste shirt has remained as the definitive kit for Argentina. The team's away kits have been in dark blue shades, with the colours of shorts and socks varying from time to time.

Argentina has also sported other kits; on 3 June 1919 in Rio de Janeiro, playing against Brazil, Argentina wore a light blue kit, similar to that of Uruguay, out of respect for Roberto Chery, a substitute goalkeeper for Uruguay, who had collapsed and died during a match against Chile at the 1919 South American Championship; the match between Argentina and Brazil was organised by the Brazilian Football Confederation for the benefit of Chery's relatives. At the 1958 World Cup, Argentina wore the yellow jersey of Swedish club IFK Malmö against West Germany, as the team had arrived in Sweden without an away kit.

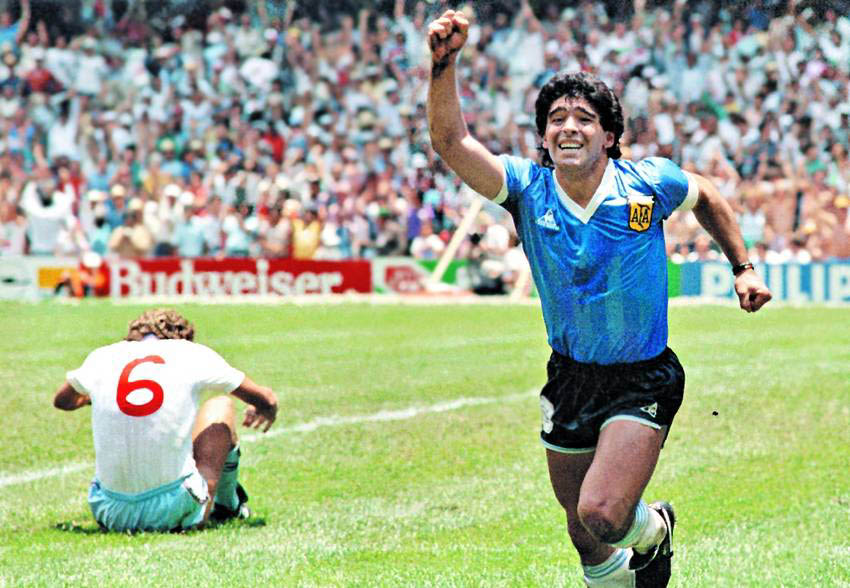
Diego Maradona, wearing Argentina's custom blue kit, celebrates his "Goal of the Century" against England in 1986

At the 1986 World Cup in Mexico, the then-manager, Carlos Bilardo, asked the team's kit supplier, Le Coq Sportif, for lighter blue shirts for their quarter-final against England in three days, but they could not be provided. Then, a member of the coaching staff scoured the shops of Mexico City for 38 plain shirts, which were transformed with an improvised version of the AFA emblem embroidered on the shirts and silvery American football numbers ironed to the backs.

Sporting the makeshift jerseys, Argentina beat England on 22 June, with Diego Maradona scoring his famous "Hand of God goal". Afterwards, the shirt became a symbol of the occasion and an important collector's item.

At the 2018 World Cup in Russia, Argentina debuted a black away kit; and at the 2022 World Cup in Qatar, they wore a purple away kit in a competitive match for the first time.

In July 2026, the Argentina national rugby team played their 2026 Nations Championship match vs England wearing a kit that was an exact replica of the model worn in 1986, including details like the silver numbers on back. The kit –manufactured by Pumas kit supplier Le Coq Sportif, the same than Argentina in 1986– was a limited edition to commemorate the 40th. anniversary of the historic football match.

=== Kit suppliers ===
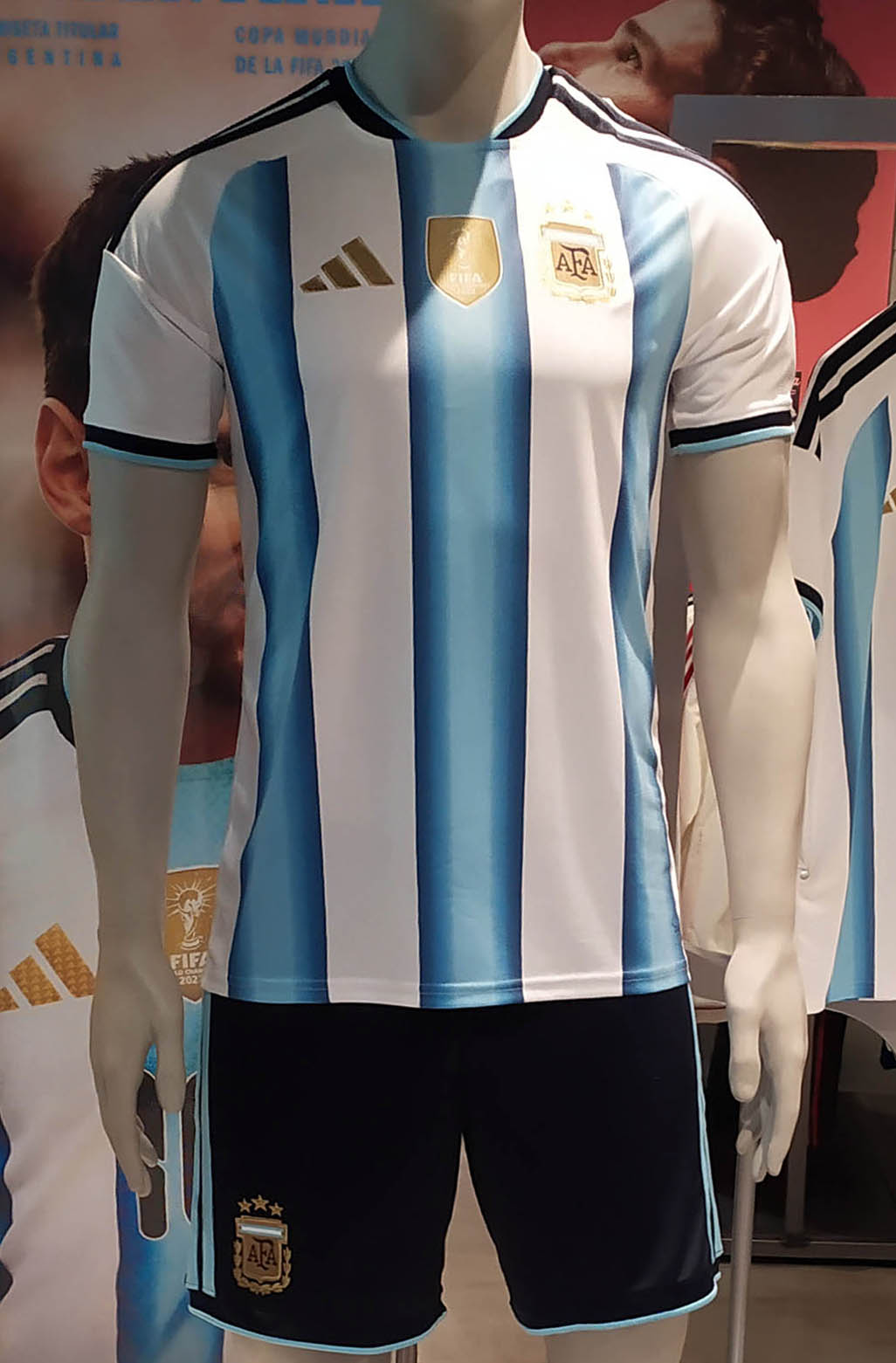
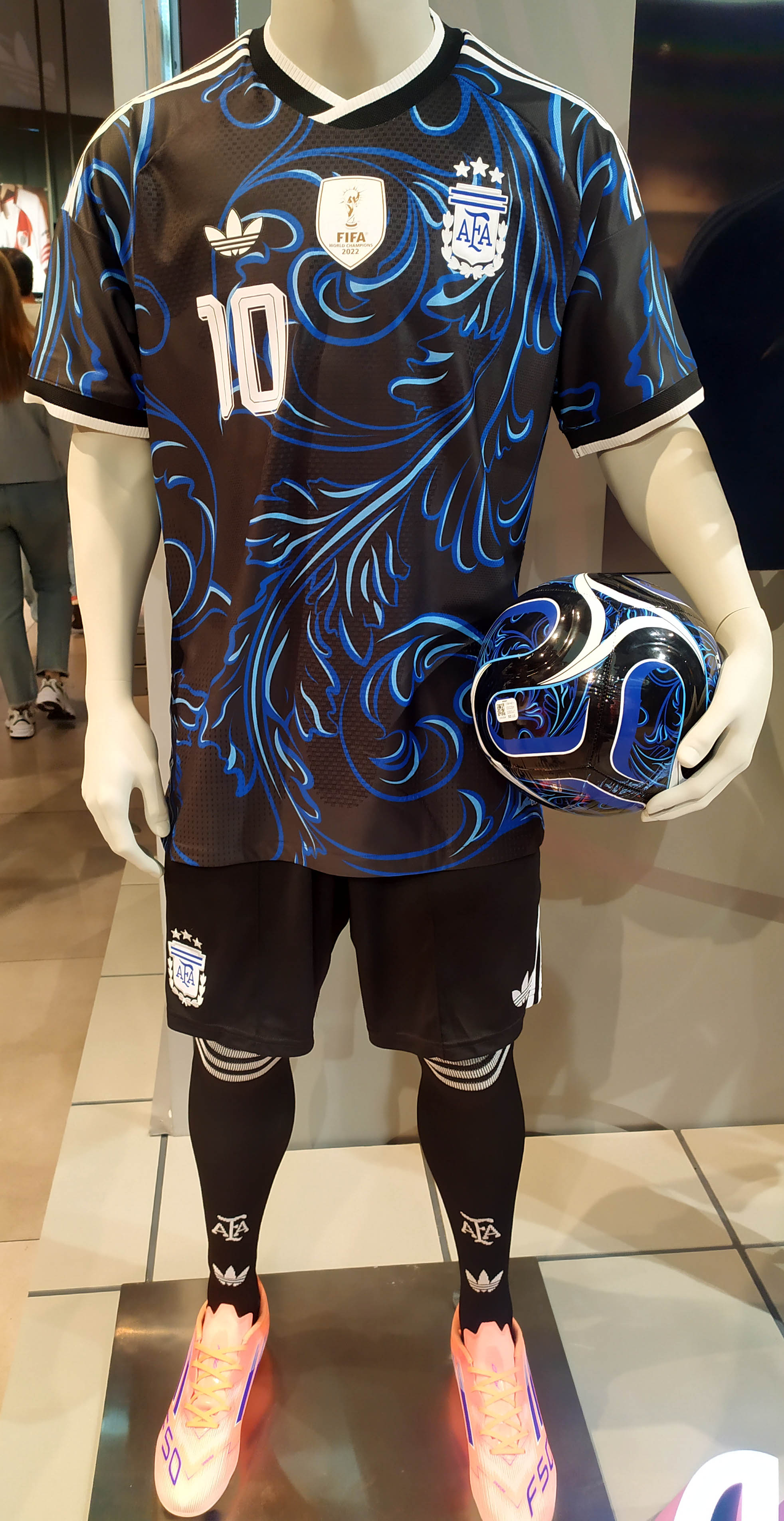
Argentina home and away kits for the 2026 FIFA World Cup

Kit supplier	Period	Ref.
(United Kingdom) St. Margaret	1901–1924	
(Argentina) Gath & Chaves	1925–1934	
(no data for the 1935–1957 period)
(Argentina) Industria Lanús	1958–1963	
(Argentina) Noceto Sports	1964–1965	
(Argentina) Sportlandia	1966	
(Argentina) Industria Lanús	1967–1973	
(Germany) Adidas	1974–1979	
(France) Le Coq Sportif	1980–1989	
(Germany) Adidas	1990–1998	
(United States) Reebok	1999–2001	
(Germany) Adidas	2001–present	

=== Crest ===
The AFA emblem that was added to playing kits in 1976

Argentina has used the logo of the Argentine Football Association as its emblem since it was first worn at the 1958 World Cup in Sweden; the logo was added to the team's jackets, but not the shirts. The emblem was not used on jerseys until 16 November 1976, when Argentina played the Soviet Union at Estadio Monumental. At the beginning, the crest used did not include a laurel wreath, which was first added for the 1982 World Cup.

As a respected and common practice, two stars were added above the crest in 2004, symbolising Argentina's World Cup titles in 1978 and 1986. In 2022, a third star was added after Argentina were crowned world champions for the third time.

The 1976 crest has been credited to Norberto "Toto" Rud, a Buenos Aires businessman, graphic designer, football supporter, and member of the Jewish sports club Club Náutico Hacoaj. Rud submitted approximately 20 designs to the Argentine Football Association, and the selected crest debuted in a friendly against the Soviet Union on 28 November 1976.

== Results and fixtures ==
The following is a list of match results in the last 12 months, as well as any future matches that have been scheduled.

Win Draw Loss Fixture

=== 2026 ===
27 March Friendly	Argentina	2–1	Mauritania	Buenos Aires, Argentina
20:15 ARG (UTC–3)	Fernández 17'; Paz 32'	Report	Lefort 90+4'	Stadium: La Bombonera; Attendance: 45,760; Referee: Derlis López (Paraguay)

31 March Friendly	Argentina	5–0	Zambia	Buenos Aires, Argentina
20:30 ARG (UTC–3)	Alvarez 4'; Messi 43'; Otamendi 50' (pen.); Chanda 68' (o.g.); Barco 90+4'	Report		Stadium: La Bombonera; Attendance: 50,000; Referee: Alexis Herrera (Venezuela)

6 June Friendly	Argentina	2–0	Honduras	College Station, United States
19:00 CDT (UTC−5)	La. Martínez 37' (pen.); Simeone 54'	Report		Stadium: Kyle Field; Attendance: 91,102; Referee: Victor Rivas (United States)

9 June Friendly	Argentina	3–0	Iceland	Auburn, United States
19:30 CDT (UTC−5)	Barco 8'; Messi 72' (pen.); Almada 86'	Report		Stadium: Jordan–Hare Stadium; Attendance: 88,043; Referee: Rosendo Mendoza (United States)

16 June 2026 FIFA World Cup Group J	Argentina	3–0	Algeria	Kansas City, United States
20:00 CDT (UTC−5)	Messi 17', 60', 76'	Report		Stadium: Arrowhead Stadium; Attendance: 69,045; Referee: Szymon Marciniak (Poland)

22 June 2026 FIFA World Cup Group J	Argentina	2–0	Austria	Arlington, United States
12:00 CDT (UTC−5)	Messi 38', 90+5'	Report		Stadium: AT&T Stadium; Attendance: 70,649; Referee: Amin Omar (Egypt)

27 June 2026 FIFA World Cup Group J	Jordan	1–3	Argentina	Arlington, United States
21:00 CDT (UTC−5)	Al-Taamari 55'	Report	Lo Celso 19'; La. Martínez 31' (pen.); Messi 80'	Stadium: AT&T Stadium; Attendance: 70,649; Referee: István Kovács (Romania)

3 July 2026 FIFA World Cup R32	Argentina	3–2 (a.e.t.)	Cape Verde	Miami Gardens, United States
18:00 EDT (UTC−4)	Messi 29'; Li. Martínez 92'; Diney 111' (o.g.)	Report	D. Duarte 59'; Lopes Cabral 103'	Stadium: Hard Rock Stadium; Attendance: 64,478; Referee: Drew Fischer (Canada)

7 July 2026 FIFA World Cup R16	Argentina	3–2	Egypt	Atlanta, United States
12:00 EDT (UTC−4)	Romero 79'; Messi 83'; Fernández 90+3'	Report	Ibrahim 15'; Ziko 67'	Stadium: Mercedes-Benz Stadium; Attendance: 68,239; Referee: François Letexier (France)

11 July 2026 FIFA World Cup QF	Argentina	3–1 (a.e.t.)	Switzerland	Kansas City, United States
20:00 CDT (UTC−5)	Mac Allister 10'; Alvarez 112'; La. Martínez 120+1'	Report	Ndoye 67'	Stadium: Arrowhead Stadium; Attendance: 69,045; Referee: João Pinheiro (Portugal)

15 July 2026 FIFA World Cup SF	England	1–2	Argentina	Atlanta, United States
15:00 EDT (UTC−4)	Gordon 55'	Report	Fernández 85'; La. Martínez 90+2'	Stadium: Mercedes-Benz Stadium; Attendance: 68,239; Referee: Ismail Elfath (United States)

19 July 2026 FIFA World Cup Final	Spain	1–0 (a.e.t.)	Argentina	East Rutherford, United States
15:00 UTC−4	Torres 106'	Report		Stadium: MetLife Stadium; Attendance: 80,663; Referee: Slavko Vinčić (Slovenia)

30 September Friendly	Argentina	4–0	Bolivia	Córdoba, Argentina
21:00 ARG (UTC–3)	La. Martínez 19'; Paz 29'; Romero 54'; López 86'	Report		Stadium: Estadio Mario Alberto Kempes; Attendance: 28,500; Referee: Jhon Ospina (Colombia)

3 October Friendly	Argentina	7–0	Burkina Faso	Buenos Aires, Argentina
21:00 ARG (UTC–3)	La. Martínez 4'; Diallo 8' (o.g.); Prestianni 12'; Paz 35'; Álvarez 36'; Mastantuono 57'; Simeone 90+3'	Report		Stadium: Estadio Monumental; Attendance: 85,000; Referee: José Cabero (Chile)

6 October Friendly	Argentina	3–0	Benin	Buenos Aires, Argentina
20:00 ARG (UTC–3)	Otamendi 48'; Paz 61'; Messi 71' (pen.)	Report		Stadium: Estadio Monumental; Attendance: 85,018; Referee: Fernando Véjar (Chile)

13 November Friendly	Argentina	1–2	Uruguay	Buenos Aires, Argentina
20:00 ARG (UTC–3)	Álvarez 73'	Report	Balerdi 48' (o.g.); M. Araújo 53'	Stadium: La Bombonera; Referee: Flávio Rodrigues de Souza (Brazil)

17 November Friendly	Argentina	7–0	Costa Rica	Córdoba, Argentina
20:00 ARG (UTC–3)	Paz 8', 38'; Álvarez 35', 43'; Mastantuono 48', 88'; Mac Allister 78'	Report		Stadium: Estadio Mario Alberto Kempes; Referee: Bruno Arleu de Araújo (Brazil)

== Coaching staff ==
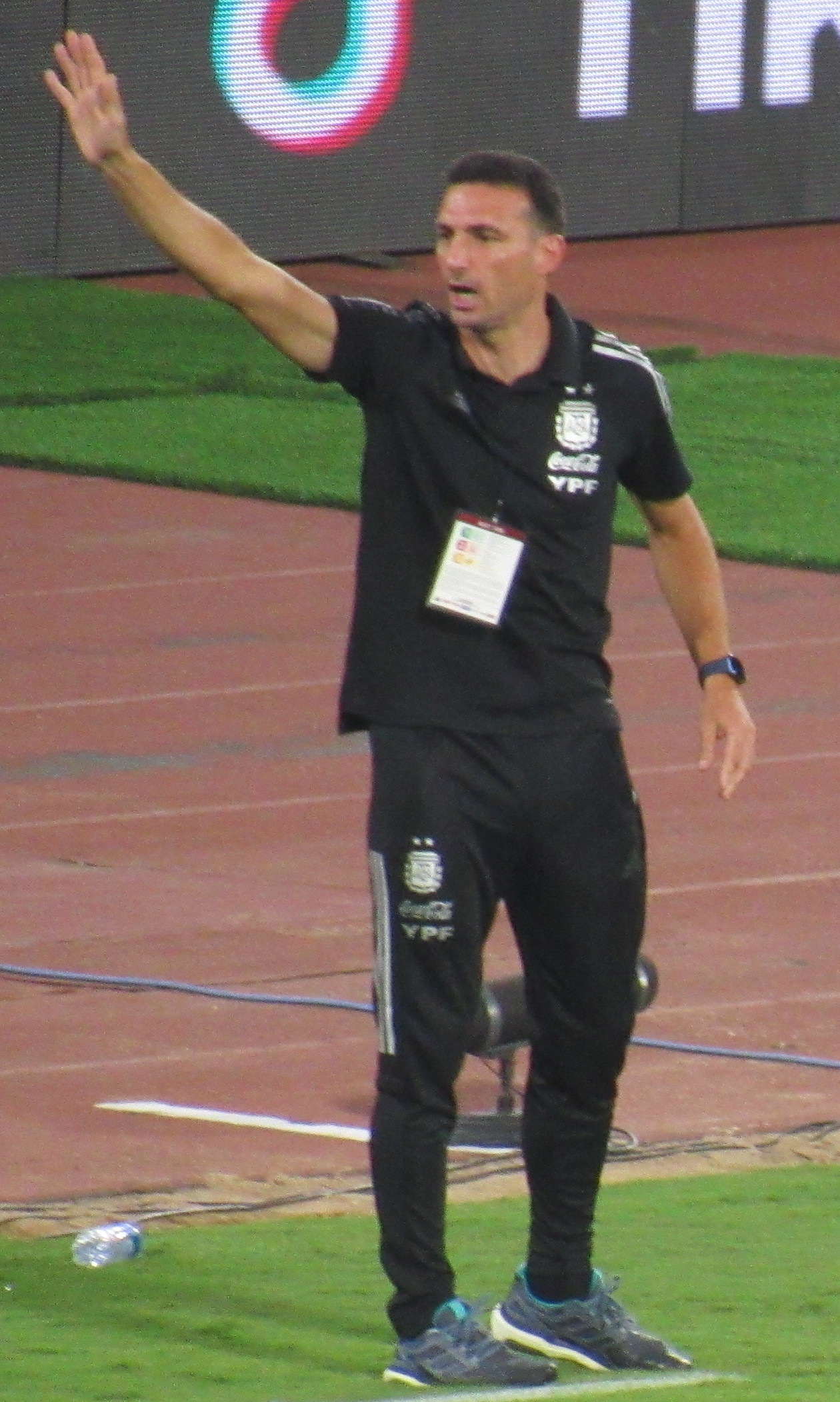
Lionel Scaloni is the incumbent head coach of Argentina

Position	Name
Head coach	(Argentina) Lionel Scaloni
Assistant coach	(Argentina) Pablo Aimar
Assistant coach	(Argentina) Roberto Ayala
Goalkeeping coach	(Argentina) Martín Tocalli
Fitness coach	(Argentina) Luis Martín
Video analyst	(Argentina) Matías Manna
Team coordinator	(Argentina) Nicolás Russo
Academy manager	(Argentina) Bernardo Romeo
Base camp coordinator	(Argentina) Oscar Dertycia
Goalkeeping coordinator	(Argentina) Mauro Dobler

== Players ==
=== Current squad ===
The following players were called up to the friendly matches against Uruguay and Costa Rica on 13 and 17 November 2026 respectively.
Caps and goals are correct as of 17 November 2026, after the friendly against Costa Rica.

No.	Pos.	Player	Date of birth (age)	Caps	Goals	Club
1	GK	Juan Musso	6 May 1994 (age 32)	4	0	(Royal Spanish Football Federation) Atlético Madrid
12	GK	Gerónimo Rulli	20 May 1992 (age 34)	10	0	(The Football Association) Manchester City
23	GK	Emiliano Martínez	2 September 1992 (age 34)	71	0	(The Football Association) Chelsea
27	GK	Santiago Beltrán	4 October 2004 (age 22)	1	0	(Argentine Football Association) River Plate
2	DF	Leonardo Balerdi	26 January 1999 (age 27)	14	0	(Italian Football Federation) Roma
3	DF	Nicolás Tagliafico	31 August 1992 (age 34)	85	1	(French Football Federation) Lyon
4	DF	Gonzalo Montiel	1 January 1997 (age 29)	47	2	(Argentine Football Association) River Plate
6	DF	Lisandro Martínez	18 January 1998 (age 28)	40	2	(The Football Association) Manchester United
19	DF	Agustín Giay	16 January 2004 (age 22)	8	0	(Brazilian Football Confederation) Palmeiras
25	DF	Facundo Medina	28 May 1999 (age 27)	18	0	(German Football Association) Bayer Leverkusen
26	DF	Mariano Troilo	21 June 2003 (age 23)	1	0	(Italian Football Federation) Parma
33	DF	Román Vega	1 January 2004 (age 22)	3	0	(Russian Football Union) Zenit Saint Petersburg
34	DF	Aarón Anselmino	29 April 2005 (age 21)	1	0	(The Football Association) Chelsea
5	MF	Equi Fernández	25 July 2002 (age 24)	1	0	(German Football Association) Bayer Leverkusen
8	MF	Enzo Fernández	17 January 2001 (age 25)	53	8	(The Football Association) Manchester City
14	MF	Exequiel Palacios	5 October 1998 (age 28)	45	0	(The Football Association) Ipswich Town
16	MF	Máximo Perrone	7 January 2003 (age 23)	3	0	(Italian Football Federation) Como
18	MF	Nico Paz	8 September 2004 (age 22)	16	6	(Italian Football Federation) Como
20	MF	Alexis Mac Allister	24 December 1998 (age 27)	59	8	(The Football Association) Liverpool
24	MF	Valentín Barco	23 July 2004 (age 22)	7	2	(The Football Association) Chelsea
7	FW	Giuliano Simeone	18 December 2002 (age 23)	18	3	(Royal Spanish Football Federation) Atlético Madrid
9	FW	Julián Alvarez	31 January 2000 (age 26)	64	19	(Royal Spanish Football Federation) Atlético Madrid
11	FW	Thiago Almada	26 April 2001 (age 25)	23	5	(Argentine Football Association) River Plate
17	FW	Gianluca Prestianni	31 January 2006 (age 20)	5	1	(Portuguese Football Federation) Benfica
21	FW	José Manuel López	6 December 2000 (age 25)	9	1	(Brazilian Football Confederation) Palmeiras
28	FW	Matías Soulé	15 April 2003 (age 23)	2	0	(Italian Football Federation) Roma
29	FW	Santiago Castro	18 September 2004 (age 22)	1	0	(Italian Football Federation) Roma
30	FW	Franco Mastantuono	14 August 2007 (age 19)	8	3	(Italian Football Federation) Fiorentina

=== Recent call-ups ===
The following players have also been called up for the team in the last twelve months.

Pos.	Player	Date of birth (age)	Caps	Goals	Club	Latest call-up
GK	Walter Benítez	19 January 1993 (age 33)	1	0	(England) Crystal Palace	2026 FIFA World Cup ^{PRE}
GK	Facundo Cambeses	9 April 1997 (age 29)	1	0	(Argentina) Racing	2026 FIFA World Cup ^{PRE}
DF	Nicolás Otamendi ^{RET}	12 February 1988 (age 38)	140	9	(Argentina) River Plate	v. Benin, 6 October 2026
DF	Cristian Romero (captain)	27 April 1998 (age 28)	61	5	(Spain) Atlético Madrid	v. Benin, 6 October 2026
DF	Valentín Gómez	26 June 2003 (age 23)	1	0	(Spain) Betis	v. Benin, 6 October 2026
DF	Tomás Palacios	28 April 2003 (age 23)	1	0	(Argentina) Estudiantes	v. Benin, 6 October 2026
DF	Juan Foyth	12 January 1998 (age 28)	22	0	(Spain) Villarreal	v. Bolivia, 30 September 2026 ^{INJ}
DF	Nahuel Molina ^{SUS}	6 April 1998 (age 28)	65	1	(Italy) Roma	2026 FIFA World Cup
DF	Marcos Senesi	10 May 1997 (age 29)	5	0	(England) Tottenham Hotspur	2026 FIFA World Cup
DF	Nicolás Capaldo	14 September 1998 (age 28)	1	0	(Germany) Hamburger SV	v. Iceland, 9 June 2026
DF	Simón Escobar	17 July 2009 (age 17)	0	0	(Argentina) Vélez Sarsfield	v. Iceland, 9 June 2026
DF	Ignacio Ovando	29 June 2007 (age 19)	0	0	(Argentina) Rosario Central	v. Iceland, 9 June 2026
DF	Marcos Acuña	28 October 1991 (age 35)	62	0	(Argentina) River Plate	2026 FIFA World Cup ^{PRE}
DF	Germán Pezzella	27 June 1991 (age 35)	42	3	(Uruguay) Peñarol	2026 FIFA World Cup ^{PRE}
DF	Lucas Martínez Quarta	10 May 1996 (age 30)	16	0	(Argentina) River Plate	2026 FIFA World Cup ^{PRE}
DF	Kevin Mac Allister	7 November 1997 (age 29)	1	0	(Belgium) Union Saint-Gilloise	2026 FIFA World Cup ^{PRE}
DF	Gabriel Rojas	22 June 1997 (age 29)	1	0	(Brazil) Cruzeiro	2026 FIFA World Cup ^{PRE}
DF	Lautaro Di Lollo	10 March 2004 (age 22)	0	0	(Argentina) Boca Juniors	2026 FIFA World Cup ^{PRE}
DF	Zaid Romero	15 December 1999 (age 26)	0	0	(Spain) Getafe	2026 FIFA World Cup ^{PRE}
MF	Rodrigo De Paul	24 May 1994 (age 32)	95	2	(United States) Inter Miami	v. Benin, 6 October 2026
MF	Giovani Lo Celso	9 April 1996 (age 30)	69	5	(Spain) Betis	v. Benin, 6 October 2026
MF	Santiago Simón	13 June 2002 (age 24)	1	0	(Mexico) Toluca	v. Benin, 6 October 2026
MF	Tobías Andrada	2 February 2007 (age 19)	0	0	(Argentina) River Plate	v. Bolivia, 30 September 2026 ^{INJ}
MF	Leandro Paredes ^{SUS}	29 June 1994 (age 32)	84	5	(Argentina) Boca Juniors	2026 FIFA World Cup
MF	Guido Rodríguez	12 April 1994 (age 32)	30	1	(Spain) Valencia	2026 FIFA World Cup ^{PRE}
MF	Nicolás Domínguez	28 June 1998 (age 28)	11	1	(England) Nottingham Forest	2026 FIFA World Cup ^{PRE}
MF	Emiliano Buendía	25 December 1996 (age 29)	2	0	(England) Aston Villa	2026 FIFA World Cup ^{PRE}
MF	Aníbal Moreno	13 May 1999 (age 27)	1	0	(Argentina) River Plate	2026 FIFA World Cup ^{PRE}
MF	Milton Delgado	16 June 2005 (age 21)	0	0	(Argentina) Boca Juniors	2026 FIFA World Cup ^{PRE}
MF	Alan Varela	4 July 2001 (age 25)	0	0	(Portugal) Porto	2026 FIFA World Cup ^{PRE}
FW	Lionel Messi ^{RET}	24 June 1987 (age 39)	208	126	(United States) Inter Miami	v. Benin, 6 October 2026
FW	Lautaro Martínez	22 August 1997 (age 29)	87	42	(Italy) Internazionale	v. Benin, 6 October 2026
FW	Nico González	6 April 1998 (age 28)	60	6	(Italy) Juventus	v. Benin, 6 October 2026
FW	Leonel Flores	6 February 2007 (age 19)	3	0	(Argentina) Boca Juniors	v. Benin, 6 October 2026
FW	Tomás Aranda	9 May 2007 (age 19)	1	0	(Argentina) Boca Juniors	v. Iceland, 9 June 2026
FW	Joaquín Freitas	2 December 2006 (age 19)	1	0	(Brazil) Flamengo	v. Iceland, 9 June 2026
FW	Alejandro Garnacho	1 July 2004 (age 22)	8	0	(England) Aston Villa	2026 FIFA World Cup ^{PRE}
FW	Claudio Echeverri	2 January 2006 (age 20)	0	0	(Portugal) Benfica	2026 FIFA World Cup ^{PRE}
FW	Mateo Pellegrino	22 October 2001 (age 25)	0	0	(Italy) Fiorentina	2026 FIFA World Cup ^{PRE}
FW	Joaquín Panichelli	7 October 2002 (age 24)	1	0	(France) Strasbourg	v. Mauritania, 27 March 2026 ^{INJ}
Notes: ^{INJ} = Withdrew due to injury.; ^{PRE} = Preliminary squad.; ^{SUS} = Suspended.; ^{RET} = Retired from the national team.; ^{WD} = Player withdrew from the squad due to non-injury issue.

== Individual records and achievements ==
As of 6 October 2026
Players in bold are still active with Argentina.

=== Most appearances ===
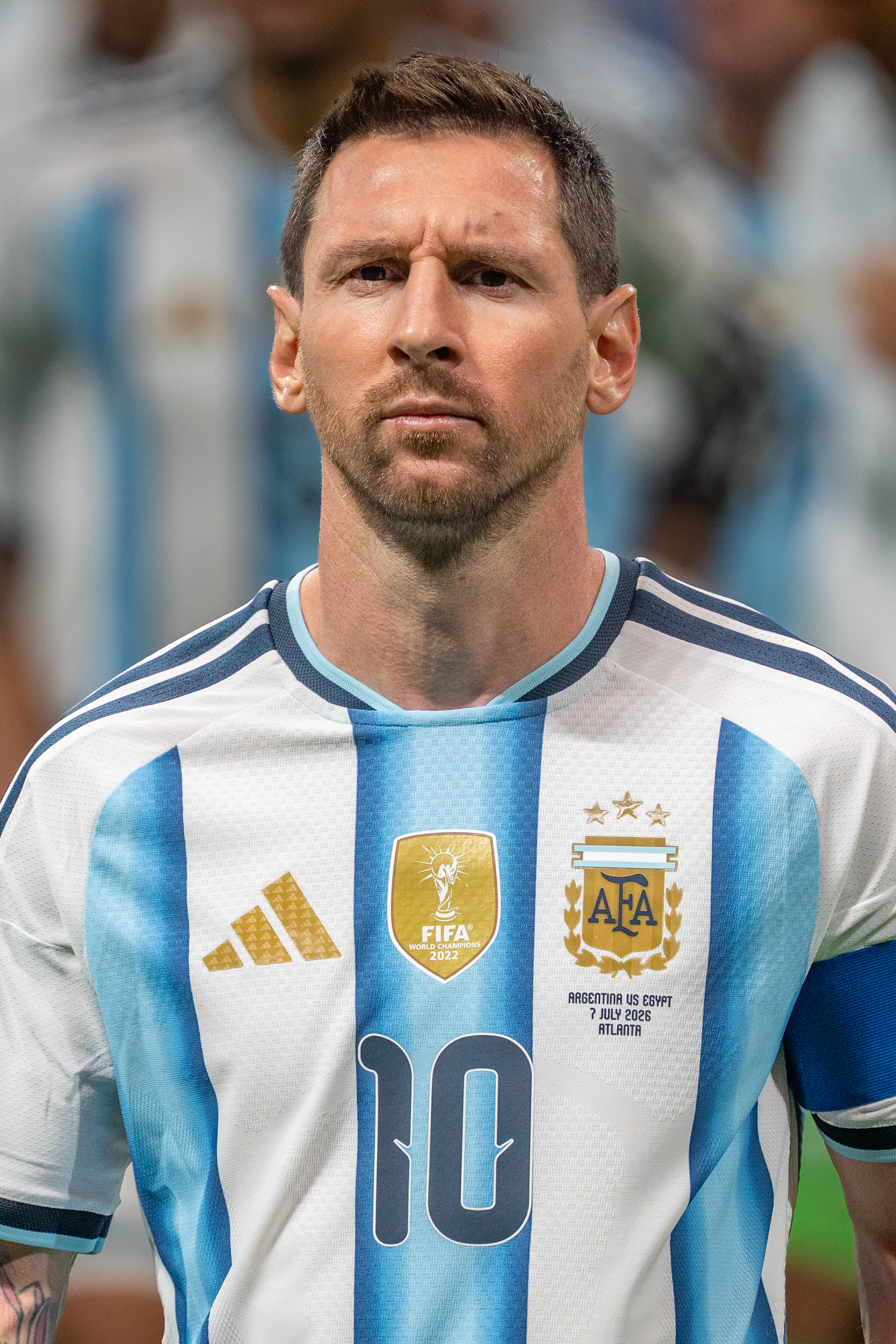
Lionel Messi is Argentina's most-capped player and all-time top goalscorer.

Rank	Player	Caps	Goals	Career
1	Lionel Messi	208	126	2005–2026
2	Javier Mascherano	147	3	2003–2018
3	Ángel Di María	145	31	2008–2024
3	Javier Zanetti	145	5	1994–2011
5	Nicolás Otamendi	140	9	2009–2026
6	Roberto Ayala	115	7	1994–2007
7	Diego Simeone	104	11	1988–2002
8	Sergio Agüero	101	41	2006–2021
9	Oscar Ruggeri	97	7	1983–1994
10	Sergio Romero	96	0	2009–2018

=== Top goalscorers ===
Rank	Player	Goals	Caps	Ratio	Career
1	Lionel Messi (list)	126	208	0.61	2005–2026
2	Gabriel Batistuta (list)	56	78	0.72	1991–2002
3	**Lautaro Martínez**	42	87	0.48	2018–present
4	Sergio Agüero	41	101	0.41	2006–2021
5	Hernán Crespo	35	64	0.55	1995–2007
6	Diego Maradona (list)	34	91	0.37	1977–1994
7	Gonzalo Higuaín	31	75	0.41	2009–2018
7	Ángel Di María	31	145	0.21	2008–2024
9	Luis Artime	24	25	0.96	1961–1967
10	Leopoldo Luque	22	45	0.49	1975–1981
10	Daniel Passarella	22	70	0.31	1976–1986

=== World Cup-winning captains ===
Year	Captains	Vice-Captains
1978	Daniel Passarella	Leopoldo Luque
1986	Diego Maradona	Oscar Ruggeri
2022	Lionel Messi	Angel Di Maria

== Competitive record ==
Champions Runners-up Third place Tournament played fully or partially on home soil

=== FIFA World Cup ===
FIFA World Cup record										Qualification record					
Year	Round	Position	Pld	W	D	L	GF	GA	Squad	Pld	W	D	L	GF	GA
(Uruguay) 1930	Runners-up	2nd	5	4	0	1	18	9	Squad	Qualified as invitees					
(Italy) 1934	Round of 16	9th	1	0	0	1	2	3	Squad	Qualified automatically					
(France) 1938	Withdrew									Withdrew					
(Brazil) 1950	Withdrew									Withdrew					
(Switzerland) 1954	Withdrew									Withdrew					
(Sweden) 1958	Group stage	13th	3	1	0	2	5	10	Squad	4	3	0	1	10	2
(Chile) 1962	Group stage	10th	3	1	1	1	2	3	Squad	2	2	0	0	11	3
(England) 1966	Quarter-finals	5th	4	2	1	1	4	2	Squad	4	3	1	0	9	2
(Mexico) 1970	Did not qualify									4	1	1	2	4	6
(West Germany) 1974	Quarter-finals (Note: Last 8 held as second group stage.)	8th	6	1	2	3	9	12	Squad	4	3	1	0	9	2
(Argentina) 1978	Champions	1st	7	5	1	1	15	4	Squad	Qualified as hosts					
(Spain) 1982	Second group stage	11th	5	2	0	3	8	7	Squad	Qualified as defending champions					
(Mexico) 1986	Champions	1st	7	6	1	0	14	5	Squad	6	4	1	1	12	6
(Italy) 1990	Runners-up	2nd	7	2	3	2	5	4	Squad	Qualified as defending champions					
(United States) 1994	Round of 16	10th	4	2	0	2	8	6	Squad	8	4	2	2	9	10
(France) 1998	Quarter-finals	6th	5	3	1	1	10	4	Squad	16	8	6	2	23	13
(South Korea) (Japan) 2002	Group stage	18th	3	1	1	1	2	2	Squad	18	13	4	1	42	15
(Germany) 2006	Quarter-finals	6th	5	3	2	0	11	3	Squad	18	10	4	4	29	17
(South Africa) 2010	Quarter-finals	5th	5	4	0	1	10	6	Squad	18	8	4	6	23	20
(Brazil) 2014	Runners-up	2nd	7	5	1	1	8	4	Squad	16	9	5	2	35	15
(Russia) 2018	Round of 16	16th	4	1	1	2	6	9	Squad	18	7	7	4	19	16
(Qatar) 2022	Champions	1st	7	4	2	1	15	8	Squad	17	11	6	0	27	8
(Canada) (Mexico) (United States) 2026	Runners-up	2nd	8	7	0	1	19	8	Squad	18	12	2	4	31	10
(Morocco) (Portugal) (Spain) 2030	Qualified as commemorative match hosts									Qualified as commemorative match hosts					
(Saudi Arabia) 2034	To be determined									To be determined					
Total	3 Title	19/23	96	54	17	25	171	109	—	171	98	44	29	293	145

=== Copa América ===
South American Championship / Copa América record
Year	Round	Position	Pld	W	D	L	GF	GA	Squad
(Argentina) 1916	Runners-up	2nd	3	1	2	0	7	2	Squad
(Uruguay) 1917	Runners-up	2nd	3	2	0	1	5	3	Squad
(Brazil) 1919	Third place	3rd	3	1	0	2	7	7	Squad
(Chile) 1920	Runners-up	2nd	3	1	2	0	4	2	Squad
(Argentina) 1921	Champions	1st	3	3	0	0	5	0	Squad
(Brazil) 1922	Fourth place	4th	4	2	0	2	6	3	Squad
(Uruguay) 1923	Runners-up	2nd	3	2	0	1	6	6	Squad
(Uruguay) 1924	Runners-up	2nd	3	1	2	0	2	0	Squad
(Argentina) 1925	Champions	1st	4	3	1	0	11	4	Squad
(Chile) 1926	Runners-up	2nd	4	2	1	1	14	3	Squad
(Peru) 1927	Champions	1st	3	3	0	0	15	4	Squad
(Argentina) 1929	Champions	1st	3	3	0	0	9	1	Squad
(Peru) 1935	Runners-up	2nd	3	2	0	1	8	5	Squad
(Argentina) 1937	Champions	1st	6	5	0	1	14	5	Squad
(Peru) 1939	Withdrew								
(Chile) 1941	Champions	1st	4	4	0	0	10	2	Squad
(Uruguay) 1942	Runners-up	2nd	6	4	1	1	21	6	Squad
(Chile) 1945	Champions	1st	6	5	1	0	22	5	Squad
(Argentina) 1946	Champions	1st	5	5	0	0	17	3	Squad
(Ecuador) 1947	Champions	1st	7	6	1	0	28	4	Squad
(Brazil) 1949	Withdrew								
(Peru) 1953	Withdrew								
(Chile) 1955	Champions	1st	5	4	1	0	18	6	Squad
(Uruguay) 1956	Third place	3rd	5	3	0	2	5	3	Squad
(Peru) 1957	Champions	1st	6	5	0	1	25	6	Squad
(Argentina) 1959	Champions	1st	6	5	1	0	19	5	Squad
(Ecuador) 1959	Runners-up	2nd	4	2	1	1	9	9	Squad
(Bolivia) 1963	Third place	3rd	6	3	1	2	15	10	Squad
(Uruguay) 1967	Runners-up	2nd	5	4	0	1	12	3	Squad
1975	Group stage	5th	4	2	0	2	17	4	Squad
1979	Group stage	8th	4	1	1	2	7	6	Squad
1983	Group stage	6th	4	1	3	0	5	4	Squad
(Argentina) 1987	Fourth place	4th	4	1	1	2	5	4	Squad
(Brazil) 1989	Third place	3rd	7	2	3	2	2	4	Squad
(Chile) 1991	Champions	1st	7	6	1	0	16	6	Squad
(Ecuador) 1993	Champions	1st	6	2	4	0	6	4	Squad
(Uruguay) 1995	Quarter-finals	5th	4	2	1	1	8	6	Squad
(Bolivia) 1997	Quarter-finals	6th	4	1	2	1	4	3	Squad
(Paraguay) 1999	Quarter-finals	8th	4	2	0	2	6	6	Squad
(Colombia) 2001	Withdrew								
(Peru) 2004	Runners-up	2nd	6	4	1	1	16	6	Squad
(Venezuela) 2007	Runners-up	2nd	6	5	0	1	16	6	Squad
(Argentina) 2011	Quarter-finals	7th	4	1	3	0	5	2	Squad
(Chile) 2015	Runners-up	2nd	6	3	3	0	10	3	Squad
(United States) 2016	Runners-up	2nd	6	5	1	0	18	2	Squad
(Brazil) 2019	Third place	3rd	6	3	1	2	7	6	Squad
(Brazil) 2021	Champions	1st	7	5	2	0	12	3	Squad
(United States) 2024	Champions	1st	6	5	1	0	9	1	Squad
Total	16 Titles	44/48	208	132	43	33	483	183	—

=== CONMEBOL–UEFA Cup of Champions ===
CONMEBOL–UEFA Cup of Champions record
Year	Round	Position	Pld	W	D	L	GF	GA
(France) 1985	Did not qualify							
(Argentina) 1993	Champions	1st	1	0	1	0	1	1
(England) 2022	Champions	1st	1	1	0	0	3	0
(Qatar) 2026	Cancelled							
Total	2 Title	2/3	2	1	1	0	4	1

=== FIFA Confederations Cup ===
FIFA Confederations Cup record
Year	Round	Position	Pld	W	D	L	GF	GA	Squad
(Saudi Arabia) 1992	Champions	1st	2	2	0	0	7	1	Squad
(Saudi Arabia) 1995	Runners-up	2nd	3	1	1	1	5	3	Squad
(Saudi Arabia) 1997	Did not qualify								
(Mexico) 1999	Did not qualify								
(South Korea) (Japan) 2001	Did not qualify								
(France) 2003	Did not qualify								
(Germany) 2005	Runners-up	2nd	5	2	2	1	10	10	Squad
(South Africa) 2009	Did not qualify								
(Brazil) 2013	Did not qualify								
(Russia) 2017	Did not qualify								
Total	1 Titles	3/10	10	5	3	2	22	14	—

=== Olympic Games ===
Olympic Games record
Year	Round	Position	Pld	W	D	L	GF	GA	Squad
(Greece) 1896	No football tournament								
(France) 1900	Only club teams participated								
(United States) 1904	Only club teams participated								
(United Kingdom) 1908	Did not participate								
(Sweden) 1912	Did not participate								
(Belgium) 1920	Did not participate								
(France) 1924	Did not participate								
(Netherlands) 1928	Runners-up	2nd	5	3	1	1	25	7	Squad
(United States) 1932	No football tournament								
(Nazi Germany) 1936	Did not participate								
(United Kingdom) 1948	Did not participate								
(Finland) 1952	Did not participate								
(Australia) 1956	Did not participate								
(Italy) 1960	Quarter-finals	7th	3	2	0	1	6	4	Squad
(Japan) 1964	Group stage	10th	2	0	1	1	3	4	Squad
(Mexico) 1968	Did not qualify								
(West Germany) 1972	Did not qualify								
(Canada) 1976	Did not qualify								
(Soviet Union) 1980	Qualified but withdrew								
(United States) 1984	Did not qualify								
(South Korea) 1988	Quarter-finals	8th	4	1	1	2	4	5	Squad
Since 1992	See Argentina national under-23 football team								
Total	Runners-up	4/19	14	6	3	5	38	20	—

=== Pan American Games ===
Pan American Games record
Year	Round	Position	Pld	W	D	L	GF	GA
(Argentina) 1951	Champions	1st	4	4	0	0	16	2
(Mexico) 1955	Champions	1st	6	5	1	0	23	7
(United States) 1959	Champions	1st	6	5	1	0	20	4
(Brazil) 1963	Runners-up	2nd	4	2	2	0	11	3
(Canada) 1967	Preliminary round	5th	3	1	1	1	7	3
(Colombia) 1971	Champions	1st	8	6	2	0	13	4
(Mexico) 1975	Third place	3rd	6	5	1	0	19	1
(Puerto Rico) 1979	Third place	3rd	5	4	1	0	9	0
(Venezuela) 1983	Preliminary round	5th	2	0	0	2	0	4
(United States) 1987	Third place	3rd	5	3	1	1	11	3
(Cuba) 1991	Did not qualify							
(Argentina) 1995	Champions	1st	6	4	2	0	10	4
Since 1999	See Argentina national under-23 football team							
Total	5 Title	11/12	55	39	12	4	139	35

== Head-to-head record ==
Below is a result summary of all matches Argentina has played against FIFA recognised teams.

As of 17 November 2026, after the match against Costa Rica

Positive record Neutral record Negative record

Opponents	Pld	W	D	L	GF	GA	GD	Win %
Albania	1	1	0	0	4	0	+4	100%
Algeria	2	2	0	0	7	3	+4	100%
Angola	2	2	0	0	4	0	+4	100%
Australia	9	7	1	1	16	8	+8	77.7%
Austria	3	2	1	0	8	2	+6	75.00%
Belarus	1	0	1	0	0	0	0	00.00%
Belgium	5	4	0	1	12	4	+8	80.00%
Benin	1	1	0	0	3	0	+3	100.00%
Bolivia	44	32	5	7	120	36	+84	73%
Bosnia and Herzegovina	3	3	0	0	9	1	+8	100%
Brazil (Note: There is a dispute in the official count of matches. Many sources do not count a few matches played between the first team of Argentina against Brazilian State Selection teams, or matches played between the first team of Argentina or Brazil against a "B" team of the rival, so they would not be "International Class A" matches. Many sources say that Argentina leads by 1 match (43–42), many others say that Argentina leads by 2 matches (41–39) and many others say Brazil leads by 1 match (43–42). For more information, see the article Argentina–Brazil football rivalry.)	111	43	26	42	167	167	0	38.7%
Bulgaria	9	8	0	1	18	6	+12	88.8%
Burkina Faso	1	1	0	0	7	0	+7	100%
Cameroon	2	0	1	1	2	3	−1	0%
Canada	3	3	0	0	9	0	+9	100%
Cape Verde	1	1	0	0	3	2	+1	100%
Chile	97	64	27	6	201	74	+127	65.9%
China	1	0	0	1	0	1	−1	0%
Colombia	43	21	12	10	74	42	+32	48.8%
Costa Rica	9	7	2	0	24	6	+18	77.7%
Croatia	6	3	1	2	8	7	+1	50%
Curaçao	1	1	0	0	7	0	+7	100%
Czechoslovakia	6	2	3	1	7	10	−3	33.3%
Denmark	2	0	1	1	1	3	−2	0%
East Germany	2	1	1	0	3	1	+2	50%
Ecuador	42	24	12	6	99	37	+62	57.1%
Egypt	3	3	0	0	11	2	+9	100%
El Salvador	3	3	0	0	7	0	+7	100%
England (Note: A match against England on 17 May 1953 was abandoned, and the result declared void, hence the number of matches played is greater than the total of wins/draws/losses.)	16	4	5	6	20	23	−3	31.25%
Estonia	1	1	0	0	5	0	+5	100%
France	13	6	4	3	18	14	+4	46.1%
Germany (Note: Includes matches against West Germany.)	23	10	6	7	34	33	+1	43.4%
Ghana	1	1	0	0	2	0	+2	100%
Greece	2	2	0	0	6	0	+6	100%
Guatemala	4	4	0	0	17	1	+16	100%
Haiti	3	3	0	0	12	1	+11	100%
Honduras	4	4	0	0	9	1	+8	100%
Hong Kong	1	1	0	0	7	0	+7	100%
Hungary	7	5	1	1	15	6	+9	71.4%
Iceland	2	1	1	0	4	1	3	50%
India	1	1	0	0	1	0	+1	100%
Indonesia	1	1	0	0	2	0	+2	100%
Iran	2	1	1	0	2	1	+1	50%
Iraq	1	1	0	0	4	0	+4	100%
Israel	5	3	1	1	14	6	+8	60%
Italy	16	5	5	6	18	22	−4	31.2%
Ivory Coast	2	2	0	0	6	1	+5	100%
Jamaica	4	4	0	0	11	1	+10	100%
Japan	7	6	0	1	15	4	+11	85.7%
Jordan	1	1	0	0	3	1	+2	100%
Libya	1	1	0	0	3	1	+2	100%
Lithuania	1	0	1	0	0	0	0	0%
Mauritania	1	1	0	0	2	1	+1	100%
Mexico	32	16	12	4	53	28	+25	50%
Morocco	2	2	0	0	4	1	+3	100%
Netherlands	10	1	5	4	8	15	−7	10%
Nicaragua	1	1	0	0	5	1	+4	100%
Nigeria	9	6	1	2	15	13	+2	66.6%
Northern Ireland	1	1	0	0	3	1	+2	100%
Norway	2	0	0	2	1	3	−2	0%
Panama	3	3	0	0	10	1	+9	100%
Paraguay	108	56	35	17	219	113	+106	51.8%
Peru	56	37	14	5	110	45	+65	66%
Poland	12	7	2	3	20	12	+8	58.3%
Portugal	8	5	1	2	13	7	+6	62.5%
Puerto Rico	1	1	0	0	6	0	+6	100%
Qatar	2	2	0	0	5	0	+5	100%
Republic of Ireland	6	5	1	0	8	1	+7	83.3%
Romania	9	6	2	1	12	6	+6	66.6%
Russia (Note: Includes matches against the Soviet Union.)	13	4	7	2	13	11	+2	30.7%
Saudi Arabia	5	2	2	1	8	5	+3	40%
Serbia and Montenegro (Note: Includes matches against Yugoslavia.)	10	5	2	3	21	15	+6	50%
Scotland	4	2	1	1	5	3	+2	50%
Singapore	1	1	0	0	6	0	+6	100%
South Africa	3	1	1	1	3	2	+1	50%
South Korea	3	3	0	0	8	2	+6	75%
Slovakia	1	1	0	0	6	0	+6	100%
Slovenia	1	1	0	0	2	0	+2	100%
Spain	15	6	2	7	18	20	−2	42.8%
Sweden	3	1	1	1	6	6	0	33.3%
Switzerland	8	6	2	0	18	4	+14	75%
Trinidad and Tobago	1	1	0	0	3	0	+3	100%
Tunisia	1	1	0	0	2	1	+1	100%
United Arab Emirates	1	1	0	0	5	0	+5	100%
United States	11	7	2	2	30	9	+21	63.6%
Uruguay	205	95	49	61	327	238	+89	46.34%
Venezuela	30	25	3	2	95	19	+76	83.3%
Wales	2	1	1	0	2	1	+1	50%
Zambia	1	1	0	0	5	0	+5	100%
Total (89)	1,114	622	265	226	2,136	1,116	+1,090	56%

== Rivalries ==
=== Brazil ===
Argentina and Brazil have a fierce rivalry which is one of the oldest in South America. Matches between the two teams, even those that are only friendly matches, are often marked by notable and controversial incidents. The rivalry has also been referred to as the "Superclassic of the Americas." FIFA has described it as the "essence of football rivalry".

The rivalry has extended to comparisons between Pelé and Diego Maradona. Some of their countrymen also feature regularly in such debates. The next most notable pair are perhaps Garrincha (Brazil) and Alfredo Di Stéfano (Argentina). The most dominant figures from the two countries in the modern game are Neymar (Brazil) and Lionel Messi (Argentina). Both Pelé and Maradona have declared Neymar and Messi their respective "successors".

=== England ===
With a rivalry stemming from the 1966 World Cup and intensified by the Falklands War of 1982, Argentina and England have had numerous confrontations in World Cup tournaments. Among them was the quarter-final match in 1986, where Diego Maradona scored two goals against England. The first was a handball, but was ruled legal by the referee. The second, scored minutes later, saw Maradona passing five England outfield players before scoring, and is often described as one of, if not the greatest goal in football history.

The nations were paired together in the round of 16 at the 1998 World Cup, won by Argentina on penalties, and again at the group stage in 2002, with England winning 1–0 through a penalty by David Beckham who had been sent off in the tie four years earlier.

Argentina and England played in the 2026 FIFA World Cup semi-final in Atlanta. This marked the first time in twenty-one years the teams have met at all, the first in twenty-four years in a major tournament and the first in twenty-eight years that both teams met in the knockout rounds. England took the lead in the 55th minute with a goal from Anthony Gordon before Argentina came back to win the match with two late goals, as Enzo Fernández equalised in the 85th minute before Lautaro Martínez scored a dramatic stoppage-time winner to eliminate England and secure Argentina's place in the final.

=== Germany ===
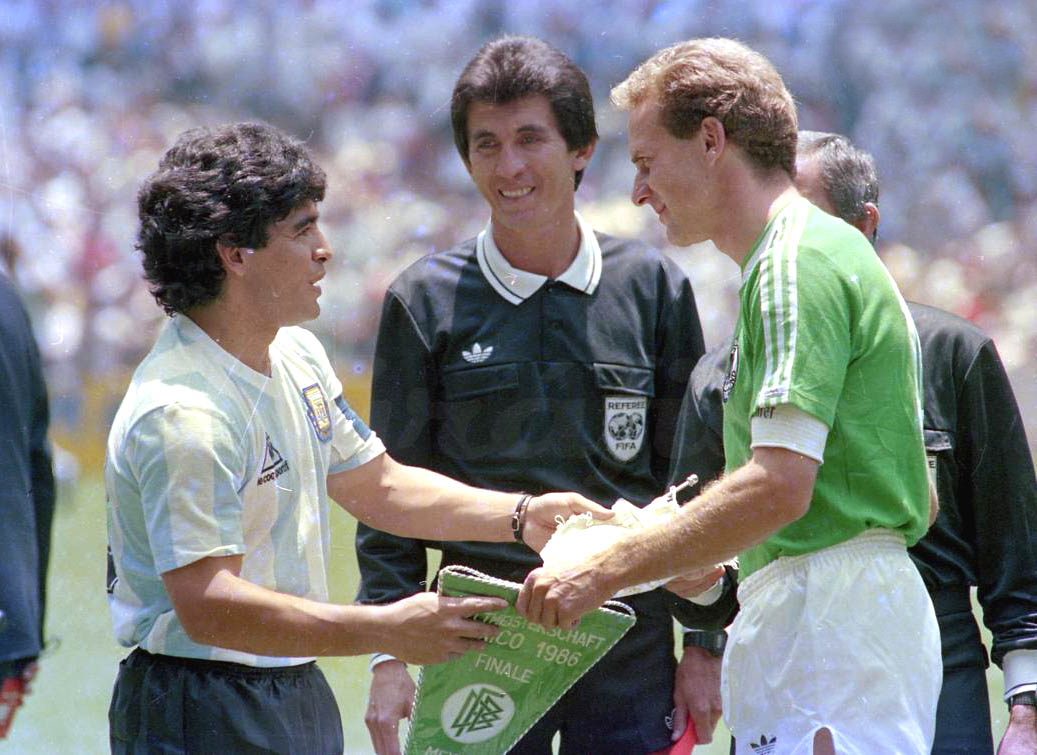
Diego Maradona and Karl-Heinz Rummenigge prior to the 1986 World Cup final between Argentina and West Germany

Argentina has played Germany in seven FIFA World Cup matches including three World Cup finals. In 1986 Argentina won 3–2, but in 1990 and 2014 it was the Germans who were the victors by a 1–0 scoreline both times.

In 1958 they met for the first time in the group stage, where Argentina suffered a 1–3 loss to defending champions West Germany. In 1966 both again faced each other in the group stage which ended in a scoreless draw. In 2006, they met in the quarter-finals; Argentina lost on penalties after a 1–1 draw, which was followed by a brawl on the pitch involving several players. They met again at the same stage in 2010, this time ending with a 4–0 victory for Germany. They played each other for the third consecutive World Cup in Brazil 2014's final, where Argentina was defeated in extra time by a score of 1–0.

=== Uruguay ===
Argentina has a long-standing rivalry with its neighbour, that came into existence from the early South American Championships, the 1928 Summer Olympics and the first World Cup final, held in 1930. Argentina and Uruguay hold the record for most international matches played between two countries. The two teams have faced each other 197 times since 1902. The first match between Argentina and Uruguay was also the first official international match to be played outside the United Kingdom. (Note: Although Canada and the United States played two internationals in 1885 and 1886, neither match is considered official; Canada did not play an official international until 1904 and the United States did not play one until 1916.)

=== Netherlands ===
Considered by sports media to be two historically great teams, the Argentines and Dutch have developed an intense rivalry. They have met ten times in total, including six times during the World Cup.

The two teams first met on 26 May 1974 in an international friendly, won by the Netherlands 4–1. Their most high-profile matchup occurred in the 1978 World Cup final which was won by Argentina. One of the most recent and intense meetings happened in the 2022 World Cup, a 2–2 draw where Argentina advanced on penalties, in what is known as the Battle of Lusail.

== Honours ==
=== Global ===
- FIFA World Cup
  - (gold) Champions (3): 1978, 1986, 2022
  - (silver) Runners-up (4): 1930, 1990, 2014, 2026
- FIFA Confederations Cup
  - (gold) Champions (1): 1992
  - (silver) Runners-up (2): 1995, 2005
- Olympic Games
  - (silver) Runners-up (1): 1928

=== Intercontinental ===
- Artemio Franchi Trophy / Finalissima
  - (gold) Champions (2): 1993, 2022 (record)

=== Continental ===
- South American Championship / Copa América
  - (gold) Champions (16): 1921, 1925, 1927, 1929, 1937, 1941, 1945, 1946, 1947, 1955, 1957, 1959-I, 1991, 1993, 2021, 2024 (record)
  - (silver) Runners-up (14): 1916, 1917, 1920, 1923, 1924, 1926, 1935, 1942, 1959-II, 1967, 2004, 2007, 2015, 2016
  - (bronze) Third place (5): 1919, 1956, 1963, 1989, 2019
- Panamerican Championship
  - (gold) Champions (1): 1960
  - (silver) Runners-up (1): 1956

=== Friendly ===
- Copa Newton (Note: Organised by Argentine and Uruguayan Associations) (17): 1906, 1907, 1908, 1909, 1911, 1916, 1918, 1924, 1927, 1928, 1937, 1942, 1945, 1957, 1973, 1975, 1976 (record)
- Copa Lipton (18): 1906, 1907, 1908, 1909, 1913, 1915, 1916, 1917, 1918, 1928, 1937, 1942, 1945, 1957, 1962, 1968, 1976, 1992 (record)
- Copa Premier Honor Argentino (7): 1909, 1911, 1913, 1914, 1918, 1919, 1920 (record)
- Copa Centenario Revolución de Mayo (Note: Organised as part of the celebrations for the Argentine Centennial.) (1): 1910
- Copa Premier Honor Uruguayo (5): 1915, 1916, 1917, 1923, 1924
- Roca Cup (Note: Organised by Brazilian and Argentine Associations) (4): 1923, 1939, 1940, 1971^{s}
- Copa Juan Mignaburu (5): 1935, 1936, 1938, 1940, 1943 (record)
- Copa Héctor Rivadavia Gómez (3): 1935, 1936, 1943 (record)
- Nations' Cup (Note: Organised by the Brazilian Confederation) (1): 1964
- Kirin Cup (Note: Organised by Japanese Kirin Company) (2): 1992, 2003
- Superclásico de las Américas (2): 2017, 2019
- Copa Times of India (1): 2011
- San Juan Cup (1): 2019

=== Awards ===
- FIFA Team of the Year (4): 2007, 2016, 2023, 2024
- Laureus World Sports Award for Team of the Year (1): 2023
- World Soccer World Team of the Year (2): 1986, 2022
- Gazzetta Sports World Team of the Year (2): 1978, 1986
- Guerin Sportivo Team of the Year (1): 1986
- FIFA World Cup Fair Play Trophy (1): 1978
- Copa America Fair Play Award (1): 2016
- AIPS Team of the Year (2): 2022, 2023

=== Chronology of titles ===
Host nation	Tournament	Year	No.
Argentina	Copa América	1921	1st
Argentina	Copa América	1925	2nd
Peru	Copa América	1927	3rd
Argentina	Copa América	1929	4th
Argentina	Copa América	1937	5th
Chile	Copa América	1941	6th
Chile	Copa América	1945	7th
Argentina	Copa América	1946	8th
Ecuador	Copa América	1947	9th
Chile	Copa América	1955	10th
Peru	Copa América	1957	11th
Argentina	Copa América	1959	12th
Costa Rica	Panamerican Championship	1960	13th
Argentina	World Cup	1978	14th
Mexico	World Cup	1986	15th
Chile	Copa América	1991	16th
Saudi Arabia	Confederations Cup	1992	17th
Argentina	Artemio Franchi Cup	1993	18th
Ecuador	Copa América	1993	19th
Brazil	Copa América	2021	20th
England	Finalissima	2022	21st
Qatar	World Cup	2022	22nd
United States	Copa América	2024	23rd

=== Summary ===
Competition	1st place, gold medalist(s)	2nd place, silver medalist(s)	3rd place, bronze medalist(s)	Total
FIFA World Cup	3	4	0	7
FIFA Confederations Cup	1	2	0	3
Olympic Games	0	1	0	1
CONMEBOL Copa América	16	14	5	35
Panamerican Championship	1	1	0	2
CONMEBOL–UEFA Cup of Champions	2	0	0	2
Total	23	22	5	50

Notes

- ^{s} Shared titles.

== See also ==
- List of Argentina national football team managers
- Argentina national under-23 football team
- Argentina national under-20 football team
- Argentina national under-17 football team
- Argentina national under-15 football team
- List of Argentina international footballers
- Argentina–Uruguay football rivalry
- Argentina–England football rivalry
- Argentina–Brazil football rivalry
- Vamos, vamos, Argentina

== Notes ==
Achievements
Preceded by 1974 West Germany	World Champions; 1978 (First title)	Succeeded by 1982 Italy
Preceded by 1982 Italy	World Champions; 1986 (Second title)	Succeeded by 1990 Germany
Preceded by 2018 France	World Champions; 2022 (Third title)	Succeeded by 2026
Preceded by Inaugural	Confederations Champions; 1992 (First title); 2024 (Sixteenth title)	Succeeded by 1992 Denmark
Preceded by 1920 Uruguay	South American Champions; 1921 (First title)	Succeeded by 1922 Brazil
Preceded by 1924 Uruguay	South American Champions; 1925 (Second title)	Succeeded by 1926 Uruguay
Preceded by 1926 Uruguay	South American Champions; 1927 (Third title); 1929 (Foutrh title)	Succeeded by 1935 Uruguay
Preceded by 1935 Uruguay	South American Champions; 1937 (Fifth title)	Succeeded by 1939 Peru
Preceded by 1939 Peru	South American Champions; 1941 (Sixth title)	Succeeded by 1942 Uruguay
Preceded by 1942 Uruguay	South American Champions; 1945 (Seventh title); 1946 (Eighth title); 1947 (Ninth title)	Succeeded by 1949 Brazil
Preceded by 1953 Paraguay	South American Champions; 1955 (Tenth title)	Succeeded by 1956 Uruguay
Preceded by 1956 Uruguay	South American Champions; 1957 (Eleventh title); 1959 (Twelfth title)	Succeeded by 1959 Uruguay
Preceded by 1989 Brazil	South American Champions; 1991 (Thirteenth title); 1993 (Fourteenth title)	Succeeded by 1995 Uruguay
Preceded by 2019 Brazil	South American Champions; 2021 (Fifteenth title); 2024 (Sixteenth title)	Succeeded by 2028
Awards
Preceded by Brazil	FIFA Team of the Year; 2007	Succeeded by Spain
Preceded by Belgium	FIFA Team of the Year; 2016	Succeeded by Germany
Preceded by Brazil	FIFA Team of the Year; 2023	Succeeded by 2024
Preceded by Italy	Laureus World Team of the Year; 2023	Succeeded by Spain women
