= List of international goals scored by Diego Maradona =

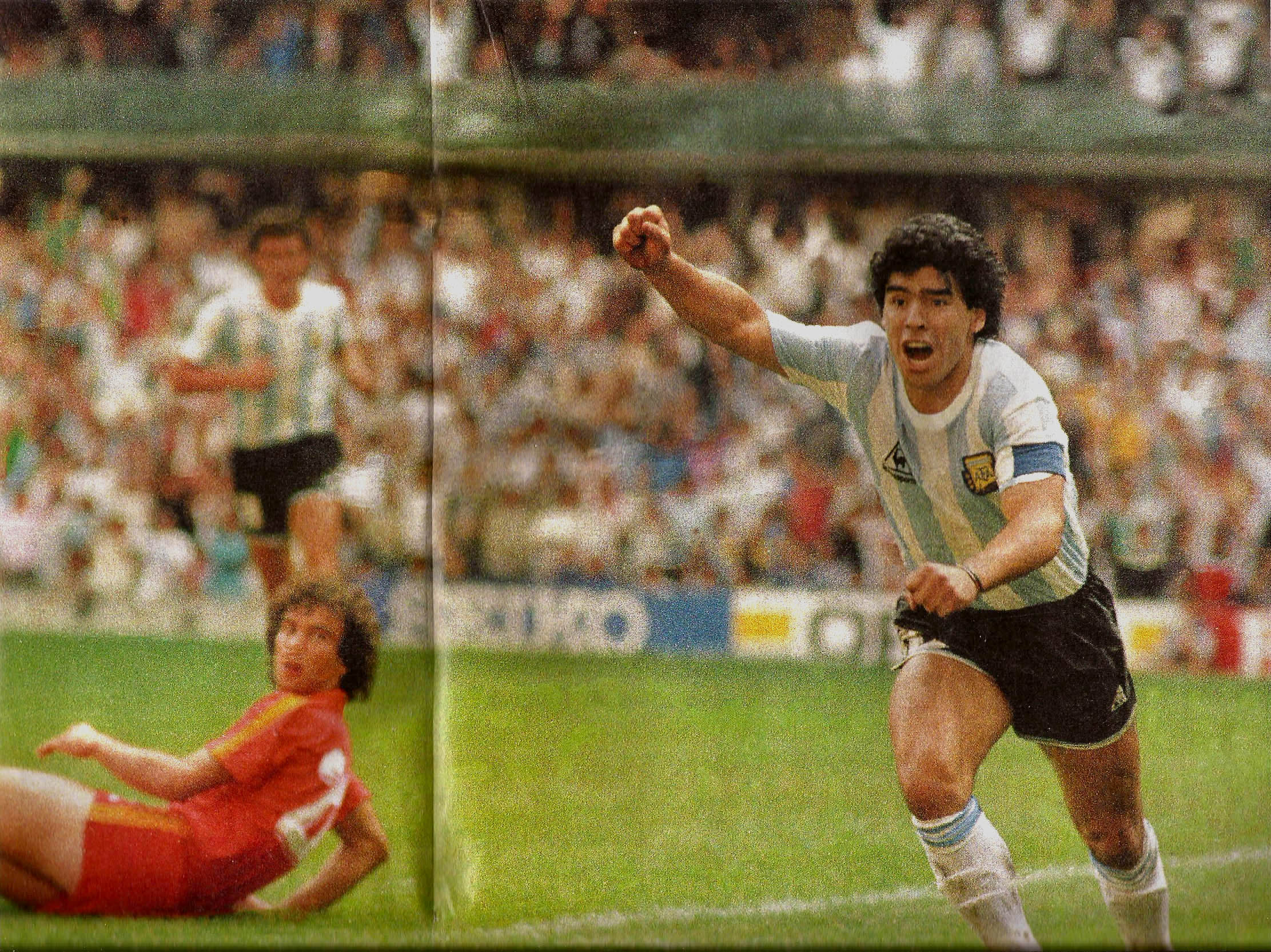
Maradona celebrating scoring a goal against Belgium at the 1986 World Cup.

Diego Maradona was an Argentine professional footballer who represented the Argentina national football team as an attacking midfielder and playmaker from 1977 to 1994. He scored 34 goals in 91 appearances, making him Argentina's sixth-highest goalscorer.

Maradona earned his first cap when he was 16 years old in 1977, in a friendly 5–1 win against Hungary. He scored his first goal in 1979 in a friendly against Scotland. He has also represented La Albiceleste at four FIFA World Cups (1982, 1986, 1990, 1994) and three Copa Américas (1979, 1987, 1989). He captained Argentina to victory in the 1986 World Cup Final, scoring both goals in their quarter-final match against England en route to the final. The first was scored with a handball that was missed by the match officials and went unpenalised, Maradona attributed the goal to "The hand of God". His second goal was dubbed the Goal of the century. He won the Golden Ball award of that tournament for being the best player.

Maradona scored his last international goal in Argentina's first 1994 World Cup match against Greece. He earned his last cap in their second match of the group stage against Nigeria, and never played for them again after failing a drug test.

== International goals ==
Scores and results list Argentina's goal tally first, score column indicates score after each Maradona goal.

Goal	Date	Venue	Opponent	Score	Result	Competition	Ref
1.	2 June 1979	Hampden Park, Glasgow, Scotland	Scotland	3–0	3–1	Friendly	
2.	25 June 1979	Estadio Monumental, Buenos Aires, Argentina	FIFA World XI	1–0	1–2	Friendly	
3.	8 August 1979	Estadio José Amalfitani, Buenos Aires, Argentina	Bolivia	3–0	3–0	1979 Copa América	
4.	30 April 1980	Estadio Monumental, Buenos Aires, Argentina	League of Ireland XI	1–0	1–0	Friendly	
5.	21 May 1980	Praterstadion, Vienna, Austria	Austria	3–0	5–1	Friendly	
6.	21 May 1980	Praterstadion, Vienna, Austria	Austria	4–1	5–1	Friendly	
7.	21 May 1980	Praterstadion, Vienna, Austria	Austria	5–1	5–1	Friendly	
8.	12 October 1980	Estadio Monumental, Buenos Aires, Argentina	Poland	2–1	2–1	Friendly	
9.	4 December 1980	Estadio José María Minella, Mar del Plata, Argentina	Soviet Union	1–0	1–1	Friendly	
10.	16 December 1980	Estadio Córdoba, Córdoba, Argentina	Switzerland	4–0	5–0	Friendly	
11.	4 January 1981	Estadio Centenario, Montevideo, Uruguay	Brazil	1–0	1–1	1980 Mundialito	
12.	18 June 1982	Estadio José Rico Pérez, Alicante, Spain	Hungary	2–0	4–1	1982 FIFA World Cup	
13.	18 June 1982	Estadio José Rico Pérez, Alicante, Spain	Hungary	3–0	4–1	1982 FIFA World Cup	
14.	9 May 1985	Estadio Monumental, Buenos Aires, Argentina	Paraguay	1–0	1–1	Friendly	
15.	14 May 1985	Estadio Monumental, Buenos Aires, Argentina	Chile	1–0	2–0	Friendly	
16.	26 May 1985	Estadio Polideportivo de Pueblo Nuevo, San Cristóbal, Venezuela	Venezuela	1–0	3–2	1986 FIFA World Cup qualification	
17.	26 May 1985	Estadio Polideportivo de Pueblo Nuevo, San Cristóbal, Venezuela	Venezuela	3–1	3–2	1986 FIFA World Cup qualification	
18.	9 June 1985	Estadio Monumental, Buenos Aires, Argentina	Venezuela	3–0	3–0	1986 FIFA World Cup qualification	
19.	14 November 1985	Memorial Coliseum, Los Angeles, United States	Mexico	1–1	1–1	Friendly	
20.	4 May 1986	Ramat Gan Stadium, Ramat Gan, Israel	Israel	1–0	7–2	Friendly	
21.	4 May 1986	Ramat Gan Stadium, Ramat Gan, Israel	Israel	6–2	7–2	Friendly	
22.	5 June 1986	Estadio Cuauhtémoc, Puebla, Mexico	Italy	1–1	1–1	1986 FIFA World Cup	
23.	22 June 1986	Estadio Azteca, Mexico City, Mexico	England	1–0	2–1	1986 FIFA World Cup	
24.	22 June 1986	Estadio Azteca, Mexico City, Mexico	England	2–0	2–1	1986 FIFA World Cup	
25.	25 June 1986	Estadio Azteca, Mexico City, Mexico	Belgium	1–0	2–0	1986 FIFA World Cup	
26.	25 June 1986	Estadio Azteca, Mexico City, Mexico	Belgium	2–0	2–0	1986 FIFA World Cup	
27.	10 June 1987	Letzigrund, Zürich, Switzerland	Italy	1–2	1–3	Friendly	
28.	27 June 1987	Estadio Monumental, Buenos Aires, Argentina	Peru	1–0	1–1	1987 Copa América	
29.	2 July 1987	Estadio Monumental, Buenos Aires, Argentina	Ecuador	2–0	3–0	1987 Copa América	
30.	2 July 1987	Estadio Monumental, Buenos Aires, Argentina	Ecuador	3–0	3–0	1987 Copa América	
31.	31 March 1988	Olympiastadion, West Berlin, West Germany	Soviet Union	2–3	2–4	Four Nations Tournament	
32.	22 May 1990	Ramat Gan Stadium, Ramat Gan, Israel	Israel	1–0	2–1	Friendly	
33.	20 April 1994	Estadio El Gigante del Norte, Salta, Argentina	Morocco	2–1	3–1	Friendly	
34.	21 June 1994	Foxboro Stadium, Foxborough, United States	Greece	3–0	4–0	1994 FIFA World Cup	

Notes

A: The match against League of Ireland XI in 1980 is considered official by FIFA.

== Statistics ==
Appearances and goals by year and competition
Year	Competitive		Friendly		Total	
Year	Apps	Goals	Apps	Goals	Apps	Goals
1977	–		3	0	3	0
1978	–		1	0	1	0
1979	2 (Note: Appearances in the 1979 Copa América)	1	6	2	8	3
1980	–		10	7	10	7
1981	2 (Note: Appearances in the 1980 Mundialito)	1	–		2	1
1982	5 (Note: Appearances in the 1982 World Cup)	2	5	0	10	2
1983	–		–		–	
1984	–		–		–	
1985	6 (Note: Appearances in the 1986 FIFA World Cup qualification)	3	4	3	10	6
1986	7 (Note: Appearances in the 1986 World Cup)	5	3	2	10	7
1987	4 (Note: Appearances in the 1987 Copa América)	3	2	1	6	4
1988	2 (Note: Appearances in the Four Nations Tournament)	1	1	0	3	1
1989	6 (Note: Appearances in the 1989 Copa América)	0	1	0	7	0
1990	7 (Note: Appearances in the 1990 World Cup)	0	3	1	10	1
1991	–		–		–	
1992	–		–		–	
1993	3 (Note: One appearance in the 1993 Artemio Franchi Cup, two appearances in the 1994 FIFA World Cup qualification)	0	1	0	4	0
1994	2 (Note: Appearances in the 1994 World Cup)	1	5	1	7	2
Total	46	17	45	17	91	34

Goals by competition
Competition	Caps	Goals
Friendlies	45	17
Copa América	12	4
FIFA World Cup qualification	8	3
FIFA World Cup tournaments	21	8
Other tournaments	5	2
Total	91	34
