= 1993 Copa América final =

- Event: 1993 Copa América
Argentina	Mexico
(Argentina)	(Mexico)
2	1
- Date: 4 July 1993
- Venue: Estadio Monumental, Guayaquil
- Referee: Márcio Rezende (Brazil)
- Attendance: 40,000

The 1993 Copa América final was the final match of the 1993 Copa América. It was held on 4 July 1993, in Guayaquil. Argentina won the match 2–1 against Mexico. This was the first time a non-CONMEBOL nation played in a Copa América final.

Managed by Alfio Basile, Argentina won the Copa América for the fourteenth time, defending their title won two years before. Argentina would not win another Copa America until 2021.

== Route to the final ==
Argentina
Round
Mexico
Opponent
Result
Group stage
Opponent
Result
Bolivia
1–0
Match 1
Colombia
1–2
Mexico
1–1
Match 2
Argentina
1–1
Colombia
1–1
Match 3
Bolivia
0–0

Group A - Final standings
Team	Pld	W	D	L	GF	GA	GD	Pts
Colombia	3	2	1	0	6	2	+4	7
Argentina	3	2	0	1	5	4	+1	6
Mexico	3	1	1	1	5	4	+1	4
Bolivia	3	0	0	3	4	10	−6	0

Opponent
Result
Knockout stage
Opponent
Result
Brazil
1–1 (6–5 p)
Quarter-finals
Peru
4–2
Colombia
0–0 (6–5 p)
Semi-finals
Ecuador
2–0

== Match details ==
4 July 1993

Argentina	2–1	Mexico
Batistuta 63', 74'		Galindo 67' (pen.)

Estadio Monumental, Guayaquil
Attendance: 40,000
Referee: Márcio Rezende (Brazil)

Argentina	Mexico

GK	1	Sergio Goycochea
RB	15	Jorge Borelli
CB	4	Fabián Basualdo	(yellow card) 22'
CB	6	Oscar Ruggeri (c)		(substituted off) 40'
LB	3	Ricardo Altamirano
CM	10	Diego Simeone
CM	17	Gustavo Zapata
CM	5	Fernando Redondo
AM	11	Néstor Gorosito	(yellow card) 42'	(substituted off) 64'
CF	18	Alberto Acosta	(yellow card) 65'
CF	9	Gabriel Batistuta	(yellow card) 77'
Substitutions:
DF	13	Fernando Cáceres		(substituted on) 40'
MF	20	Leonardo Rodríguez		(substituted on) 64'
Manager:
(Argentina) Alfio Basile

GK	1	Jorge Campos
RB	21	Raúl Gutiérrez		(substituted off) 79'
CB	2	Claudio Suárez	(yellow card) 58'
CB	3	Juan de Dios Ramírez
LB	5	Ramón Ramírez
RM	7	David Patiño		(substituted off) 46'
CM	4	Ignacio Ambríz
LM	8	Alberto García Aspe	(yellow card) 35'
AM	17	Benjamín Galindo
RF	9	Hugo Sánchez (c)	(yellow card) 38'
LF	11	Luís Roberto Alves
Substitutions:
LF	10	Luis García		(substituted on) 46'
RF	15	Luis Flores		(substituted on) 79'
Manager:
(Mexico) Miguel Mejía Barón
