= List of Argentine films of 2026 =

A list of Argentine-produced and co-produced feature films released or scheduled for release in Argentina in 2026. When applicable, the domestic theatrical release date is favoured.

== Film openings ==
Release		Title (Domestic title)	Cast and crew	Distribution label	Ref.
J A N U A R Y	15	The Virgin of the Quarry Lake (La virgen de la tosquera)	Director: Laura Casabé Cast: Dolores Oliverio, Fernanda Echevarría, Luisa Merelas, Agustín Sosa, Dady Brieva	BF Paris	
J A N U A R Y	22	The Whisper (El susurro)	Director: Gustavo Hernández Cast: Ana Clara Guanco, Luciano Cáceres, Marcelo Michinaux	Moving Pics	
F E B R U A R Y	19	Parque Lezama	Director: Juan José Campanella Cast: Luis Brandoni, Eduardo Blanco	Maco Cine	
M A R C H	5	Landmarks (Nuestra tierra)	Director: Lucrecia Martel	Moving Pics	
M A R C H	19	Solo fanáticos	Director: Leo Damario Cast: Antonella "China" Kruger, Benjamín Vicuña, Nacha Guevara, Emilia Attias, Turco Naím, Rafael Spregelburd, Martín Slipak, Donato de Santis	Digicine	
M A R C H	26	El último gigante	Director: Marcos Carnevale Cast: Oscar Martínez, Matías Mayer, Inés Estévez, Silvia Kutika, Yoyi Francella, Alexia Moyano, Luis Luque	Netflix	
A P R I L	9	La casaca de Dios	Director: Fernán Mirás Cast: Natalia Oreiro, Jorge Marrale, Zoe Peralta, Facundo Antaman, Damián Dreizik, Lautaro Delgado, Rafael Ferro, Damián Canduci	Moving Pics	
A P R I L	16	Risa and the Wind Phone (Risa y la cabina del viento)	Director: Juan Cabral Cast: Diego Peretti, Cazzu, Joaquín Furriel, Elena Romero	Digicine	
A P R I L	17	The Blue Box (La caja azul)	Director: Martín Hodara Cast: Luisana Lopilato, Gustavo Bassani	Prime Video	
M A Y	21	The Match (El Partido)	Director: Juan Cabral, Santiago Franco Cast: Gary Lineker, John Barnes, Jorge Burruchaga, Jorge Valdano, Oscar Ruggeri, Peter Shilton, Ricardo Giusti, Julio Olarticoechea	Buena Vista International	
M A Y	21	Nada entre los dos	Director: Juan Taratuto Cast: Natalia Oreiro, Gael García Bernal	Moving Pics	
A U G U S T	6	Canelones	Director: Christian Basilis, Ana Laura Gussoni Cast: Verónica Llinás, Darío Barassi, Agustín Aristarán, César Bordón	Digicine	
A U G U S T	13	Yo, narciso	Director: Adrián Suar Cast: Adrián Suar, Natalia Oreiro, Sofía Morandi, Julieta Zylberberg	Buena Vista International	
S E P T E M B E R	3	Pepita the Gunslinger (Pepita La Pistolera)	Director: Lucía Puenzo Cast: Luisana Lopilato, Alberto Ajaka, Charo López, Claudio Tolcachir, Marcelo Subiotto, Camila Peralta, Esteban Bigliardi, Gustavo Bassani	Buena Vista International	

== Box office ==
As of October 2026, the ten most watched Argentine films in 2026, by domestic admissions, were as follows:

Most watched films of 2025
Rank	Title	Distributor	Admissions
1	Yo, narciso	Buena Vista International	597,000
2	Pepita the Gunslinger	Buena Vista International	104,000
3	The Virgin of the Quarry Lake (La virgen de la tosquera)	BF Paris	91,000
4	Wolf Beach (Playa de lobos)	Buena Vista International	68,000
5	The Match (El partido)	Buena Vista International	46,000
6	Our Land (Nuestra tierra)	Moving Pics	46,000
7	La casa	Moving Pics	30,000
8	Risa and the Wind Phone (Risa y la cabina del viento)	Digicine	29,000
9	Canelones	Digicine	18,000
10	Parque Lezama	MACO Cine	17,000
