= Argentina v England =

Argentina v England may refer to:

- Argentina v England (1986 FIFA World Cup)
- Argentina–England football rivalry
