= León Arslanián =

Argentine lawyer, jurist and public official

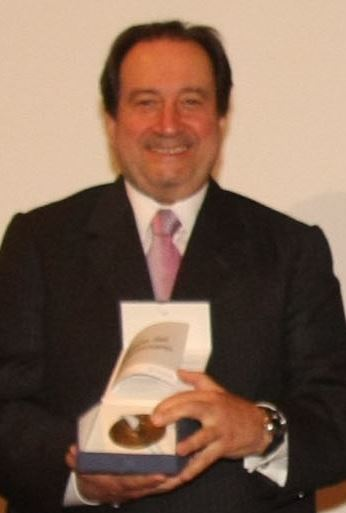
- Born: November 30, 1941 (age 84); Buenos Aires
- Education: University of Buenos Aires

León Arslanián (born November 30, 1941) is an Argentine lawyer, jurist and public official who notably served as Chief Justice in the tribunal that presided over the 1985 Trial of the Juntas.

== Life and times ==
León Carlos Arslanián was born in Buenos Aires. His father was an Armenian Argentine tailor who emigrated from Aintab (today Gaziantep), in 1917. He enrolled at the Colegio Nacional de Buenos Aires and later at the University of Buenos Aires, where he earned a law degree.

Arslanián was appointed to the National Criminal Court of Appeals in 1984 by the newly inaugurated government of President Raúl Alfonsín, and in this capacity, he served in the panel of judges overseeing the historic 1985 Trial of the Juntas, presiding over the sentencing phase that concluded on December 9.

He resigned his post in the National Criminal Court of Appeals in 1988, and joined fellow tribunal judge Jorge Torlasco in a private law practice. President Carlos Menem appointed Arslanián Minister of Justice on January 30, 1991. Arslanián succeeded in having the nation's penal code reformed to mandate oral testimony in all criminal trials, and enacted the creation of a Court of Cassation for the purpose. President Menem's appointment of two conservative figures to the new tribunal raised objections by Arslanián, however, and the Justice Minister resigned on September 6, 1992.

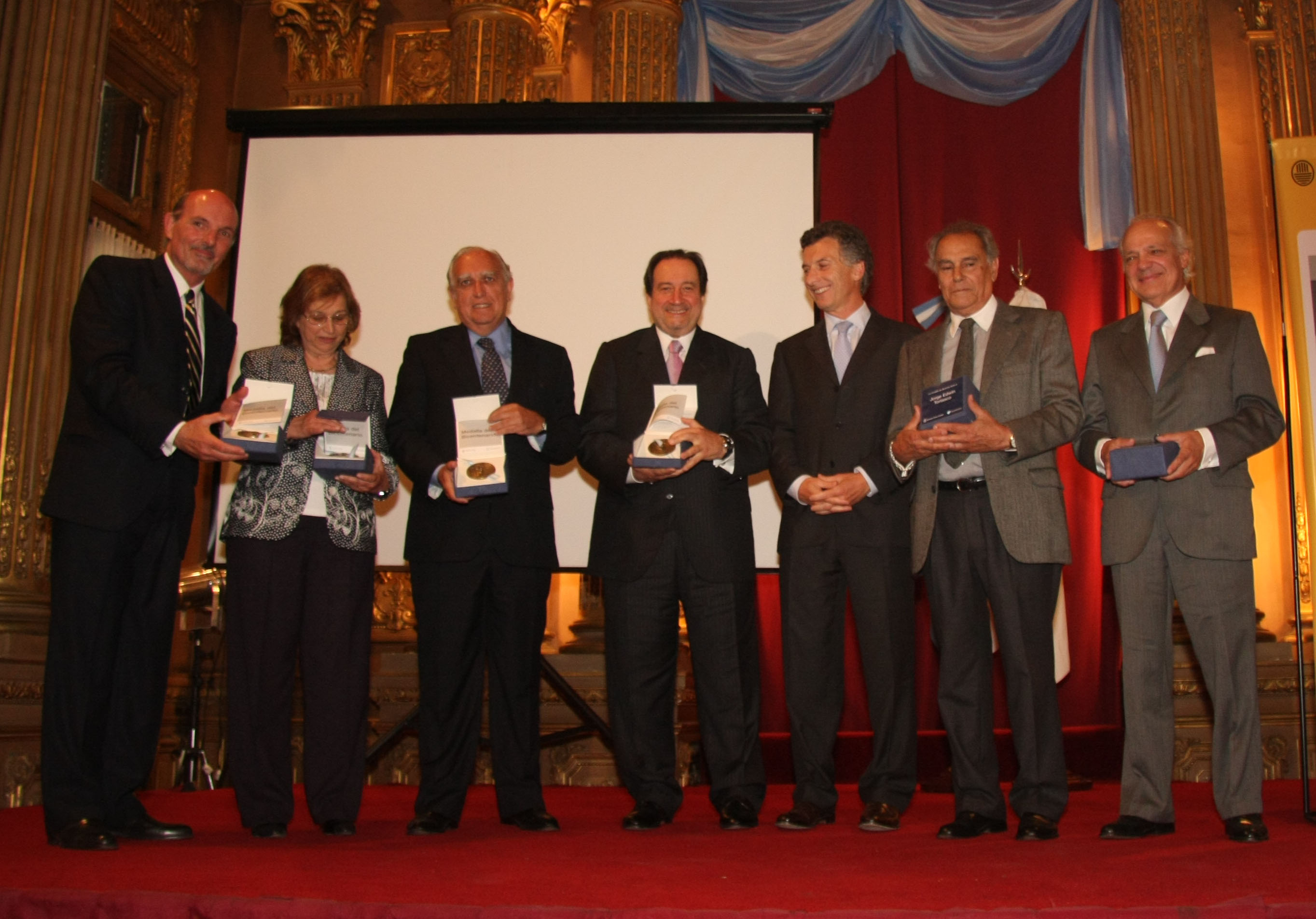
León Arslanián (middle) joins fellow presiding judges of the 1985 Trial of the Juntas in receiving the Bicentennial Medal from Mayor Mauricio Macri (third from right) on October 26, 2010.

He was designated president of the Province of Buenos Aires Crime Prevention Institute on February 11, 1998, and on April 13, accepted the post as provincial Minister of Justice and Security from Governor Eduardo Duhalde.

Arslanián proposed gun control measures, enacted stricter guidelines against police misconduct and streamlined criminal court proceedings, to which he attributed speedier rulings and a decline in crime rates in the province's coastal tourism hub, for example. His advocacy of secondary crime prevention policies centered around a more robust social policy. This stance, however, coincided with increased voter anxiety surrounding rising crime rates, as well as higher poll numbers for right-wing Unidád Bonaerense candidate Luis Patti. Governor Duhalde supported the Justice Minister and his policy; but following repeated criticism by the frontrunner, Justicialist Party gubernatorial candidate Carlos Ruckauf, Arslanián resigned on August 5. Ruckauf was elected governor and appointed far-right former Carapintadas mutineer Aldo Rico as Arslanián's successor.

He returned to public service in April 2004, when Buenos Aires Governor Felipe Solá named him Minister of Security. He established a 9-1-1 emergency dialing system, and moved to delegate Provincial Police powers to a number of auxiliary departments. Ongoing reports of police corruption prompted the Minister's dismissal of up to 5,000 officers; but budgeting restrictions limited the formation of the new auxiliary forces. Arrests rose by 91% during Arslanián's tenure despite these problems; but opposition figures reiterated claims that he was "soft on crime" as elections approached in 2007, deriding Arslanián as the "Minister of Insecurity." He stepped down from the post in December and returned to private practice.

He joined the Democratic Security Agreement (ASD), a progressive advocacy group dealing with crime prevention, and in 2010 presented a proposal to the Argentine Chamber of Deputies for the creation of a Crime Observation Office to better quantify and examine crime trends and causes in Argentina.
