= Argentina–England football rivalry =

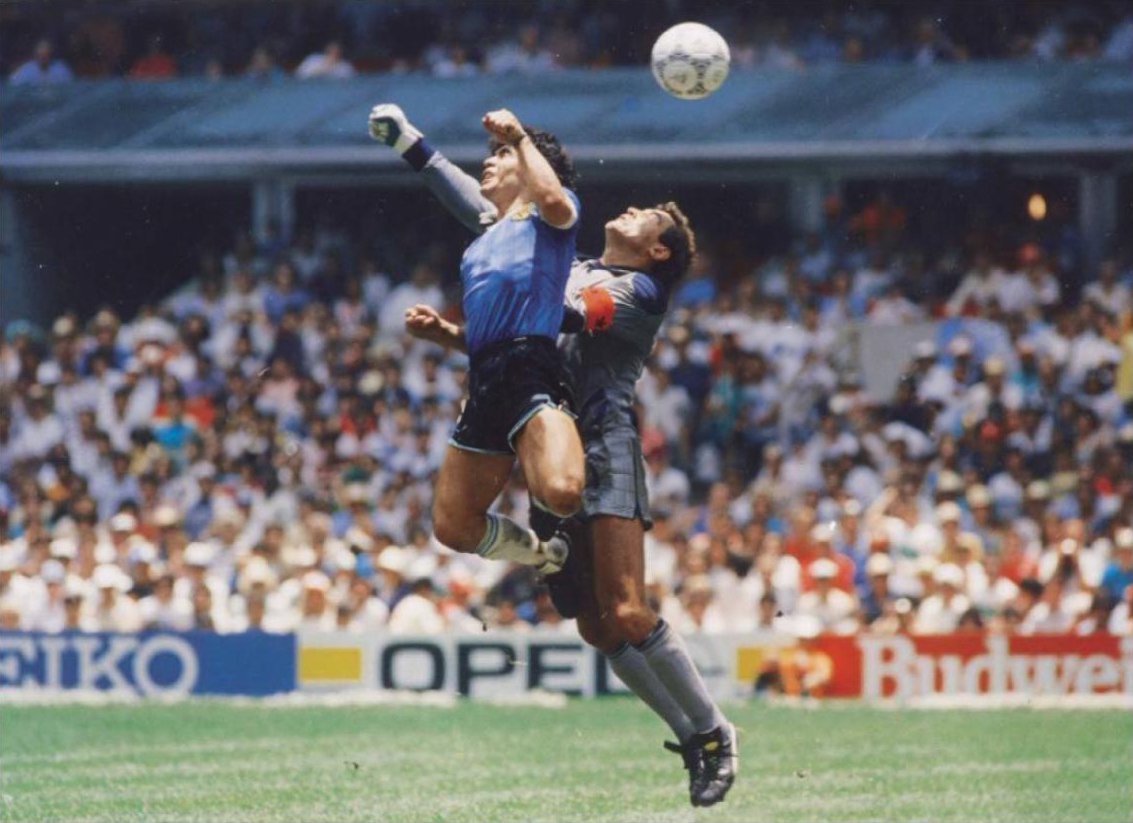
- The moment when Diego Maradona flicks the ball with his hand past the outstretched arm of Peter Shilton to score The Hand of God goal at the 1986 World Cup.
- Location: Argentina (CONMEBOL); England (UEFA)
- Teams: Argentina; England
- First meeting: 9 May 1951; Friendly; England 2–1 Argentina
- Latest meeting: 15 July 2026; FIFA World Cup semi-finals England 1–2 Argentina

Statistics
- Total meetings: 15
- Most wins: England (6)
- Top scorer: Michael Owen (3 goals)
- Largest victory: England 3–1 Argentina (2 June 1962); England 3–1 Argentina (13 May 1980)
- Largest goal scoring: Argentina 2–3 England (12 November 2005)

The Argentina–England football rivalry is a sports rivalry between the national football teams of Argentina and England. Exacerbated by historical political tensions, it is widely considered one of the most intense rivalries in international sport. Fixtures between the two nations, including friendly matches, are frequently characterised by notable and controversial incidents involving both players and fans.

The rivalry is unusual in that it is an intercontinental one; typically such footballing rivalries exist between countries that are close to one another, for example England–Ireland or Argentina–Brazil. England is regarded in Argentina as one of the major rivals of the national football team, matched only by Brazil, Germany and Uruguay. The rivalry is seen as equal in England – matched by rivalries with Ireland, Scotland, France, and Germany teams – partly due to non-footballing events, especially the 1982 Falklands War between Argentina and the United Kingdom.

The rivalry emerged across several games during the second half of the twentieth century. It was driven by various controversial incidents, particularly those in the games played between the teams at the 1966, 1986, 1998 and 2026 FIFA World Cups. Overall, England holds the edge in the rivalry in official matches, with six victories, to four by Argentina. In the World Cup, England and Argentina have a split head-to-head record, with three English victories (in 1962, 1966 and 2002) to Argentina's three (1986, the 1998 shoot-out victory and 2026). In knockout stage matches, Argentina leads the head-to-head record against England 3–1. Argentina eliminated England from the World Cup in 1986, 1998 and 2026, while England did the same to Argentina only in 1966.

== Early history ==
=== British influence on Argentine football ===
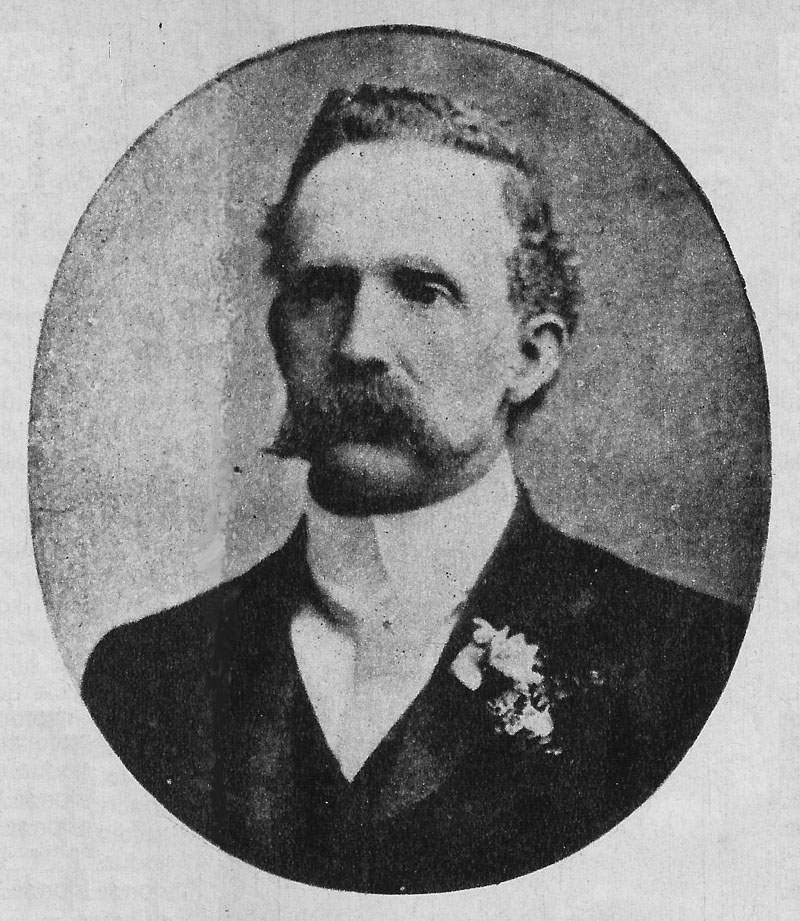
Alexander Watson Hutton, "the father of Argentine football", founder of Alumni A.C., the most winning team of Argentina until its dissolution

In the latter half of the 19th century, the Argentine capital Buenos Aires had a large expatriate British community of some 40,000 people. As in many other parts of the world, football was introduced to Argentina by the British. The first recorded football match played in Argentina was organized by the Buenos Aires Cricket Club in Palermo, Buenos Aires, on 20 June 1867, and played between two teams of British railway workers, the White Caps and the Red Caps (it was common in the early days of football for teams to be distinguished by caps rather than jerseys).

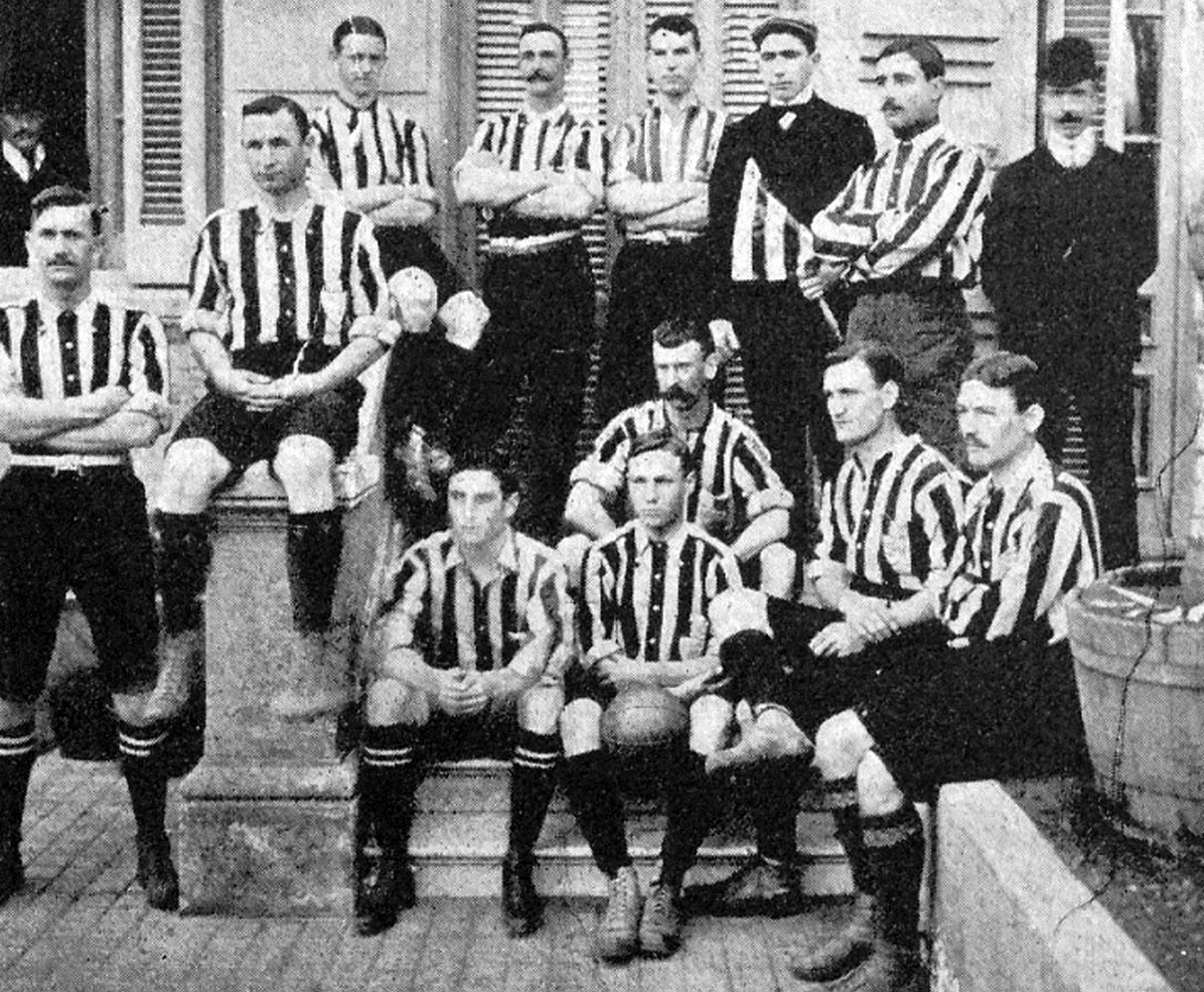
Team of Alumni that beat South Africa 1–0 in 1906, becoming the first Argentine team to defeat a British club

The so-called "father of Argentine football" was a Glaswegian schoolteacher, Alexander Watson Hutton, who first taught football at the St. Andrew's Scots School in Buenos Aires in the early 1880s. On 4 February 1884, he founded the Buenos Aires English High School, where he continued to instruct the pupils in the game. In 1898, Alumni Athletic Club, a football team formed by the BAEHS students, was established. Alumni would be the most successful team of Argentina, winning a total of 22 titles until it was dissolved in 1913. Moreover, Alumni also became the first local team to defeat a British side, South Africa (mostly composed of British–origin players) 1–0 at Sociedad Sportiva Argentina, which set up a landmark in Argentine football.

In 1891, Hutton established the Association Argentine Football League. Five clubs competed but only one season of games was played. A new league, The Argentine Association Football League, was formed 21 February 1893 and would eventually become the Argentine Football Association (AFA). In these early days of football in Argentina, nearly all of the players and officials were expatriate Britons or of British extraction, and the oldest football clubs in Argentina such as Rosario Central, Newell's Old Boys and Quilmes A.C., were all founded by British expatriates.

In the 20th century, several British football clubs tours to South America contributed to the spread and development of football in the region. The first club to tour on the region was Southampton in 1904, followed by several teams (mainly from England although some Scottish clubs also visited South America) until 1929 with Chelsea being the last team to tour.

During those 25 years of tours, British teams' performances were decreasing while the South American squads' style of playing improved. Indeed, Southampton won all of their matches in 1904 with 40 goals scored in 1904 while Chelsea was defeated eight times (over 16 games played) in their 1929 tour.

As the popularity of the game increased, the British influence on the game waned and by 1912, the Association was renamed "Asociación del Fútbol Argentino". The British influence on the game in Argentina, however, shows in the continued use of terms such as "corner" and "wing" rather than their Spanish translations. The names of several famous teams in Argentina are also English in origin, such as River Plate, or influenced by the language, such as Boca Juniors, due to the British prevalence on the sport and the mandatory use of English language.

In the 1940s the Argentine Football Association used English referees in its competitions.

=== First matches ===
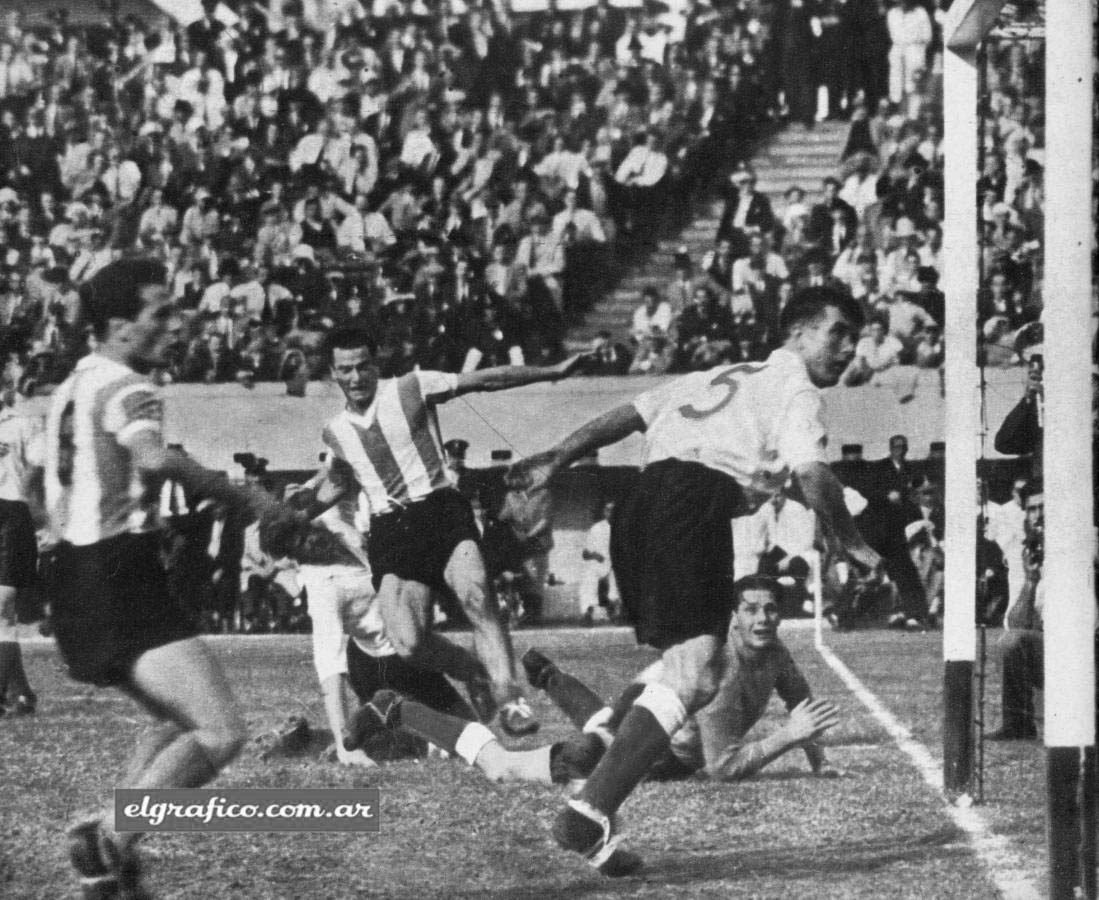
The goal scored by Ernesto Grillo during a 1953 friendly match played at River Plate stadium, where Argentina won 3–1

The national teams had met before their 1966 clash – Argentina were the first team other than Scotland to play England at Wembley Stadium in 1951 when the inaugural full international match between the sides ended with a 2–1 victory for England. They also played two matches in 1953 in Buenos Aires. The first, a 3–1 victory for Argentina, was considered an unofficial international by England, who fielded a second-string team dubbed an FA XI. Although this match appears in some records citing Argentina's list of official internationals, it is not listed as a full international by either the AFA or FIFA. Nevertheless, the Argentines consider it to be their first ever victory over England. Afterwards, one Argentine politician stated that "we nationalised the railways, and now we have nationalised football!"

The second 1953 international was an official match for both teams: England playing with a stronger line-up involving Alf Ramsey, Nat Lofthouse and Tom Finney; Argentina sticking with the same line-up used in the first match. The game, however, was abandoned after 23 minutes due to torrential rain, with a 0–0 scoreline. The match also set a record of 91,000 spectators, the highest attendance for a football match in Argentina until then. Argentina and England next met in the 1962 FIFA World Cup in Chile, where England's 3–1 victory in the group stage led to Argentina's exit from the tournament. Argentina's first victory over England in a full international occurred in a 1–0 win in June 1964, during the Taça das Nações friendly tournament in Brazil.

== Comparison in major tournaments ==
Key

Denotes which team finished better in that particular competition.
DNQ: Did not qualify.
DNP: Did not participate.
TBD: To be determined.

Tournament	Argentina	England	Notes
1930 FIFA World Cup	2nd	DNP	
1934 FIFA World Cup	10th	DNP	
1938 FIFA World Cup	Withdrew	DNP	
1950 FIFA World Cup	Withdrew	10th	
1954 FIFA World Cup	Withdrew	7th	
1958 FIFA World Cup	13th	11th	
1962 FIFA World Cup	9th	8th	In the group stage, England defeated Argentina 3–1.
1966 FIFA World Cup	5th	1st	Tournament hosted by England. In the quarterfinals, England defeated Argentina 1–0.
1970 FIFA World Cup	DNQ	8th	
1974 FIFA World Cup	8th	DNQ	
1978 FIFA World Cup	1st	DNQ	Tournament hosted by Argentina.
1982 FIFA World Cup	11th	6th	
1986 FIFA World Cup	1st	8th	In the quarterfinals, Argentina defeated England 2–1. This match was known for Maradona's Hand of God goal and few minutes later the Goal of the Century, also by Maradona.
1990 FIFA World Cup	2nd	4th	
1994 FIFA World Cup	7th	DNQ	
1998 FIFA World Cup	6th	9th	In the Round of 16, Argentina defeated England 4–3 on penalties when the match ended 2–2 after extra time.
2002 FIFA World Cup	18th	6th	In the group stage, England defeated Argentina 1–0.
2006 FIFA World Cup	6th	7th	
2010 FIFA World Cup	5th	13th	
2014 FIFA World Cup	2nd	26th	
2018 FIFA World Cup	16th	4th	
2022 FIFA World Cup	1st	6th	
2026 FIFA World Cup	2nd	3rd	In the semifinals, Argentina defeated England 2–1.
2030 FIFA World Cup	TBD		

== Crucial moments ==
=== 1966 World Cup ===
In spite of all of this history, it was not until the 1966 FIFA World Cup, held in and eventually won by England, that the rivalry picked up the sometimes bitter and fierce edge that it retains. The two teams met in the quarter-finals of the tournament, a game referred to in Argentina as el robo del siglo ("the theft of the century") that England won 1–0 thanks to a goal from striker Geoff Hurst, disputed by the Argentines due to a claimed offside.

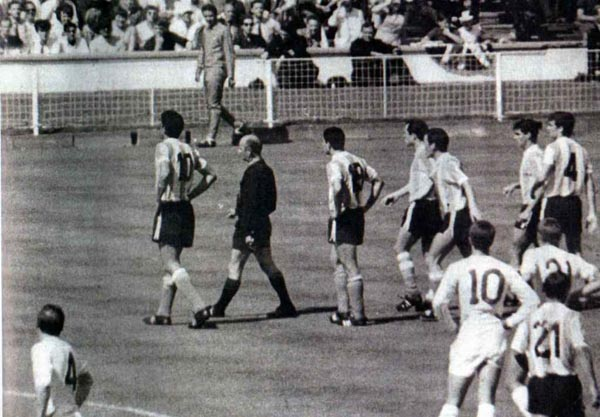
Rattín is sent off in the Argentina vs England match in the 1966 FIFA World Cup

The game, however, was particularly noted for the sending off of Argentina captain Antonio Rattín after receiving his second caution of the game. The Argentines considered the second caution to be unfair, including Rattín himself, who had to be escorted from the pitch by police as he refused to leave the pitch. Rattín was cautioned at the start of the match for a lunge on Bobby Charlton. Rattín then fouled Geoff Hurst and received another caution (the use of yellow/red cards would not be adopted until the next World Cup in Mexico) for arguing with the referee for a teammate's foul.

It was reported in Argentina that the West German referee, Rudolf Kreitlein, said that he had sent off Rattín because he did not like how he had looked at him, while British newspapers cited the official as having given the reason as "violence of the tongue", despite the referee speaking no Spanish. Rattín's intention appeared to have been to speak with the German referee, as according to the Argentines, he was ruling in favour of the English team. Rattín made a visible signal showing his captain's armband and intention to call a translator.

Ken Aston, the English supervisor of referees, entered the field to try to persuade Rattín to leave, but he only exacerbated the situation since the Latin American teams had already suspected that the English and West Germans were collaborating to eliminate them from the competition. After his dismissal, Rattín scrunched the corner flag (featuring the Union Jack) with his hand before finally sitting down on the ground. After the match, England manager Alf Ramsey refused to allow his players to swap shirts with the Argentines (as is traditional after the conclusion of a major football match) and later described the South Americans as "animals" in the press. The Argentine press and public were outraged, and one Argentine newspaper published a picture of the official World Cup mascot, World Cup Willie, dressed in pirate regalia to demonstrate their opinion of the England team.

=== 1986 World Cup ===
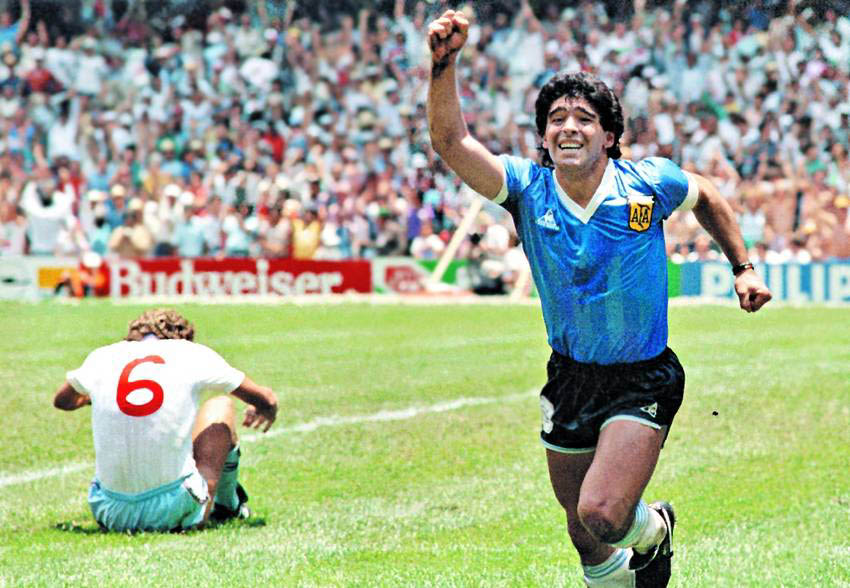
Diego Maradona celebrating his second goal (considered "the best goal in World Cup history") during the 1986 FIFA World Cup.

The rivalry between the sides continued in friendlies in 1974, 1977 and 1980. The match at Wembley in 1974 was officiated by an Argentinian referee, who awarded the away side a penalty in the last five minutes that Mario Kempes converted to secure a 2–2 draw. In Buenos Aires in June 1977, a 1–1 draw between the teams was marred by a punch by Daniel Bertoni on Trevor Cherry that resulted in both players being sent off. England beat Argentina 3–1 at Wembley in a less contentious match in 1980 that marked Diego Maradona's first appearance against England.

The next competitive game between the two teams occurred at the 1986 World Cup in Mexico, again at the quarter-final stage. The encounter was made particularly incendiary by the 1982 Falklands War fought between the Argentine Republic and the United Kingdom four years previously, and many in Argentina saw the game as being an opportunity to exact revenge upon England for England's part in the conflict.

Argentina took the lead through a highly controversial goal from Maradona, who punched the ball into the net with his hand. The goal was allowed to stand by the Tunisian referee Ali Bin Nasser, much to the fury of the English team and its fans. The goal, dubbed the "Hand of God goal" after Maradona's tongue-in-cheek description of how it was scored, has become infamous in England, particularly as England went on to lose the game and Argentina later won the tournament.

Also in this game, Maradona scored a second goal, voted in 2002 as the best goal in World Cup history, before English striker Gary Lineker pulled one back, but England could not score again and lost 2–1. Despite the skill of his second goal, Maradona wrote in his autobiography that "I sometimes think I preferred the one with my hand ... It was a bit like stealing the wallet of the English." He also wrote, in reference to the Falklands conflict, that "it was as if we had beaten a country, not just a football team ... Although we had said before the game that football had nothing to do with the Falkland Islands war, we knew they had killed a lot of Argentine boys there, killed them like little birds. And this was revenge."

At the end of the game, England's Steve Hodge swapped shirts with Maradona, and later sold the shirt at auction for £7.1 million. Maradona praised the English as they did not use rough tactics like the other teams that frequently fouled and knocked him over.

The game added hugely to the rivalry between the two teams in England where they felt that they had been cheated out of the competition by Maradona's handball. The importance of both goals for the English people can be seen as the fact they were chosen sixth in the list of 100 Greatest Sporting Moments in 2002 by Channel 4. Meanwhile, in Argentina, the game was seen as revenge for the Falklands War and for what they still see as the unfair game in the 1966 World Cup.

=== 1991 friendly ===
On 25 May 1991, a friendly match between the two teams was played at Wembley. Argentina, now under the management of Alfio Basile, were preparing for the forthcoming Copa América 1991, which they went on to win. The South Americans had a new generation of players mainly playing locally, replacing the very successful group of the previous two World Cup tournaments. The game was mostly under the control of England, but near the end, Argentina came back from two goals down to draw 2–2. Claudio García and Darío Franco scored with headers.

Despite not being a victory, the result was celebrated in Argentina, especially as both Argentine goals came from corner kicks, which in Argentina were seen as being a part of the game at which the English usually excelled.

=== 1998 World Cup ===
The next meeting between the two countries came in the round of 16 of the 1998 FIFA World Cup, held in Saint-Étienne, France. The game had many noteworthy aspects including a goal that is considered to be one of England's greatest ever goals, scored by young striker Michael Owen.

The match is also remembered for David Beckham receiving a red card. Beckham had been fouled by Diego Simeone and as Simeone stood up, he rubbed his knuckles against the back of Beckham's head as Beckham lay face-down on the pitch. Lying on the floor, Beckham swung his leg at Simeone, after which Simeone fell over, and the referee sent Beckham off.

Playing with ten men, England held out against the Argentine attacks and, in the dying moments of the game during a scramble in the Argentine penalty area, Sol Campbell headed the ball into the goal. As the England players began to celebrate a winning goal, the referee blew for a foul that Alan Shearer was judged to have committed on the Argentine goalkeeper prior to the goal and disallowed it. The consequent free kick was taken very quickly, while the England players were still celebrating, and they had to rush back to prevent the Argentines from scoring.

The scores stayed level at 2–2 until the end of extra time. In the ensuing penalty shoot-out that decided the game, Argentina won 4–3 after two English kicks (David Batty's and Paul Ince's) were saved by their goalkeeper Carlos Roa.

Immediately following the game, Beckham was vilified by the English press for his perceived petulance and naïvety on the international stage; the headline in The Daily Mirror the following day described the England team as: "10 Heroic Lions, One Stupid Boy", Simeone has since made a subsequent "confession" where he admitted to simulating the injury from the kick in order to get Beckham sent off, and as all his teammates urged the referee to give Beckham the red card. However, Sports Illustrated was critical of the Argentines' theatrics in that event, stating that Simeone first delivered a "heavy-handed challenge" on Beckham and then "fell like a ton of bricks" to get Beckham sent off, noting that the Argentines used similar "theatrics" in their next match against the Netherlands which got a Dutch player sent off (however, Argentina lost that match 2–1).

=== 2000 friendly and 2002 World Cup ===
Another friendly was played on 23 February 2000, again at Wembley, but ended 0–0. It was also the same day when former England footballer Sir Stanley Matthews died aged 85. Then, the teams were drawn to meet once more in the group stage of the 2002 FIFA World Cup. Having been knocked out by Argentina in two of the previous three World Cups in which they had competed, tension in England was high. This tension was raised by the England team gaining only a draw in their opening match against Sweden, meaning that they needed a good result against Argentina to avoid being eliminated from the competition.

David Beckham, the England captain, scored the only goal of the match, a penalty kick following a foul on Michael Owen by Mauricio Pochettino, which many felt redeemed Beckham in the eyes of the English sporting public for his dismissal four years earlier. As The Times described it in their match report, "vilified for the red card that helped to usher England out of the 1998 World Cup at the hands of Argentina, he wakes this morning with his halo brighter than ever." Despite a late onslaught from the Argentine players at the end of the second half of the game, England maintained the scoreline and won 1–0, and partly as a result of this Argentina (one of the pre-tournament favourites to win) were knocked out in the first round.

Although the Argentine players and public criticised the awarding of the penalty kick, the game was generally played in a good, if highly competitive, spirit, and there was none of the bitterness that had affected the 1966, 1986 and 1998 meetings. Diego Simeone and David Beckham, whose clash in the 1998 meeting had resulted in Beckham's sending-off, shook hands in the middle of the game.

As expected, Argentine fans were extremely disappointed with the result of this match and the subsequent draw with Sweden. A new "controversy" developed among the fans in the aftermath of the game when it was claimed that Argentine captain Juan Sebastián Verón had purposely diminished the quality of his game, because he had to return to England to play with Manchester United. Verón denied the allegations.

=== 2005 friendly ===
Argentina and England would face off again on neutral ground in Geneva on 12 November 2005 when the two teams, having both already qualified for the 2006 FIFA World Cup, met in a friendly. Both teams selected strong sides. England twice came from behind to beat Argentina 3–2 with goals from Michael Owen from crosses by Steven Gerrard and Joe Cole in the dying moments. The result and performance were welcomed enthusiastically by the English press and public. The general nature of the match was also less intensely vitriolic than on previous occasions, with The Times reporting, "by the unpleasant standards of previous confrontations, the skirmish between England and Argentina edged towards the saccharine, although the concept is deeply relative. The latest encounter featured no punches on the terraces, songs about the Falkland Islands, jibes regarding players' sexuality and general churlishness that, believe it or not, represents a significant thaw in diplomatic relations." England's victory was the first time either side had won consecutive matches against the other.

=== 2026 World Cup ===
Recreation of the banner displayed by the Argentine players after the match.

On 15 July, Argentina and England played in the 2026 FIFA World Cup semi-final in Atlanta. This marked the first time in twenty-one years the teams have met at all, the first in twenty-four years in a major tournament and the first in twenty-eight years that both teams met in the knockout rounds.

Before kick off, the tension in the stadium had already built up, as each nation's supporters booed and jeered during their opponents' national anthem. First, the English national anthem was drowned by chants and jumps from the Argentine fan base that translated as "And they can see, and they can see, whoever doesn't jump is an English man". By the third minute, Jude Bellingham was pushed by Leandro Paredes, seemingly unprompted. Not long after, play came to a pause as shoving and confrontation started between both teams.

Four yellow cards were given, three to Argentina, one to England, with a total of 26 fouls committed. Players engaged in tripping, shirt tugging, and harsh tackles throughout the first half, calming down during the second. England took the lead in the 55th minute with a goal from Anthony Gordon before Argentina came back to win the match with two late goals by Enzo Fernández and Lautaro Martínez, both assisted by Lionel Messi. After the 55th minute, Argentina went on to control the match with 88% possession, 2 shots on the post and 3 on target, before the late comeback.

After the match, some Argentine players controversially displayed a banner taken from the crowd that read "Las Malvinas son Argentinas" ("The Falklands are Argentinian") and later left it on the pitch of the Mercedes-Benz Stadium.

Additionally, public and media criticism of England manager Thomas Tuchel's tactics after England's goal led many to call for his dismissal.

== List of matches ==
List of matches between the countries
#	Date	City	Venue	Winner	Score	Competition	Goalscorers (Argentina)	Goalscorers (England)
1	9 May 1951	London	Wembley	England	2–1	Friendly	Boyé	Mortensen, Milburn
– (Note: This match is not considered by the England football association as a full international, and so it is not included in the numbered list.)	14 May 1953	Buenos Aires	Estadio Monumental	Argentina	3–1	Friendly	Grillo (2), Micheli	Taylor
2	17 May 1953	Buenos Aires	Estadio Monumental	Draw (Note: Abandoned after 23 minutes because of rain.)	0–0	Friendly		
3	2 June 1962	Rancagua	El Teniente	England	3–1	1962 World Cup (group stage)	Sanfilippo	Flowers, Charlton, Greaves
4	6 June 1964	Rio de Janeiro	Maracanã	Argentina	1–0	Taça das Nações	A. Rojas	
5	23 July 1966	London	Wembley	England	1–0	1966 World Cup (quarter-final)		Hurst
6	22 May 1974	London	Wembley	Draw	2–2	Friendly	Kempes (2)	Channon, Worthington
7	12 June 1977	Buenos Aires	La Bombonera	Draw	1–1	Friendly	Bertoni	Pearson
8	13 May 1980	London	Wembley	England	3–1	Friendly	Passarella	D. Johnson (2), Keegan
9	22 June 1986	Mexico City	Azteca	Argentina	2–1	1986 World Cup (quarter-final)	Maradona (2)	Lineker
10	25 May 1991	London	Wembley	Draw	2–2	Challenge Cup	C. García, Franco	Lineker, Platt
11	30 June 1998	Saint-Étienne	Geoffroy-Guichard	Argentina (Note: won on penalties.)	2–2 (a.e.t.) (4–3 p)	1998 World Cup (round of 16)	Batistuta, Zanetti	Shearer, Owen
12	23 February 2000	London	Wembley	Draw	0–0	Friendly		
13	7 June 2002	Sapporo	Sapporo Dome	England	1–0	2002 World Cup (group stage)		Beckham
14	12 November 2005	Geneva	Stade de Genève	England	3–2	Friendly	Crespo, Samuel	Rooney, Owen (2)
15	15 July 2026	Atlanta	Mercedes-Benz	Argentina	2–1	2026 World Cup (semi-finals)	Fernández, La. Martínez	Gordon

== Matches overview ==
Competition	Played	Argentina won	Draw	England won	Argentina goals	England goals
FIFA World Cup	6	2	1 (Note: Argentina defeated England on penalties in the 1998 World Cup)	3	7	9
Friendly (Note: Matches in minor competitions are included here as friendly matches. The unofficial 1953 match is not included in these figures.)	9	1	5	3	10	13
Total	15	3	6	6	17	22

=== Facts and figures ===
- In Argentina (2 matches): 1 draw, 1 abandonment
- In England (6 matches): 3 England wins, 3 draws
- Neutral venues (6 matches): 3 England wins, 2 Argentina wins, 1 draw (Argentina won on penalties)
- Both teams have knocked each other out on the way to winning World Cups – England in 1966 and Argentina in 1986.

=== Official titles comparison ===
Senior titles	Argentina	England
FIFA World Cup	3	1
FIFA Confederations Cup	1	0
CONMEBOL–UEFA Cup of Champions	2	0
Copa América/European Championship	16	0
Panamerican/Nations League	1	0
Total	23	1

== Club level ==
At the club level, matches have also been heated. Argentine and English clubs have not had many chances to play against each other, but when they have done so there have been notable incidents. The most memorable matches happened in the Intercontinental Cup. In 1968, Estudiantes de La Plata played against Manchester United for the Cup. The first leg was in Buenos Aires, where Estudiantes' supporters were highly vocal and the game was played in a very physical manner with a disputed red card and physical injury. Manchester United could not recover the 1–0 deficit in the second leg and Estudiantes won the title.

Nine years later, in 1977, Liverpool refused to play against Boca Juniors, so Boca played against European runner-up Borussia Mönchengladbach and obtained their first cup. In 1978, Liverpool alleged "scheduling conflicts"; the cup was not played.

During the 1978 European tour of River Plate, the Argentine team achieved a 2–1 victory over Sheffield United. The match was played at Bramall Lane as part of the transfer of Alejandro Sabella to the English club.

In 1984, Independiente played Liverpool for the trophy that, by this point, had been renamed the "Toyota Cup". The format had also changed, to a single game played in Japan, making it easier for teams to attend. Independiente won 1–0 with a goal by José Percudani.

At the 2007 Peace Cup (held in Japan) between Argentine side River Plate and English club Reading, the game ended in a 1–0 win for the Argentines. Likewise at the 2009 Edmonton Cup in Canada, River Plate defeated Everton 1–0 with a goal scored by Ariel Ortega.

The most recent match between an English and Argentine club was between Arsenal and Boca Juniors in July 2011, a friendly staged in London as part of the annual Emirates Cup.

=== Official finals between Clubs ===
Champion	Result(s)	Losing team	Competition
(Argentina) Estudiantes (LP)	1–0	(England) Manchester United	1968 Intercontinental Cup
(Argentina) Estudiantes (LP)	1–1	(England) Manchester United	1968 Intercontinental Cup
(Argentina) Independiente	1–0	(England) Liverpool	1984 Intercontinental Cup

== Fans' behaviour ==
Much of the colour and violence in this rivalry is added by the fans themselves. While matches prior to the 1982 Falklands War generated interest and emotion, it was the war itself that fuelled passions and elevated this rivalry. Before the 1986 game, fans from both countries had a fight in the Mexico City streets and inside the stadium, with English flags stolen by the Argentine fans and English fans being injured in attacks by Argentine barras bravas.

== See also ==
- History of rugby union matches between Argentina and England
- Argentina–United Kingdom relations
