= The Match (2026 film) =

2026 documentary film by Juan Cabral

- International promotional poster
- Spanish: El Partido
- Directed by: Juan Cabral; Santiago Franco
- Written by: Juan Cabral; Santiago Franco
- Based on: El Partido by Andrés Burgo
- Produced by: Flora Fernández Marengo
- Cinematography: Pablo Gallego
- Edited by: Lucas Coppolechia; Sebastian Fasanelli; Juan Pablo Scaglione; Mauro Caporossi
- Music by: Nico Barry; Tomas Jacobi
- Production companies: Industria del Milagro; Labhouse; Blurr Stories
- Distributed by: Buena Vista International
- Release dates: 13 May 2026 (Cannes); 21 May 2026 (Argentina)
- Running time: 91 minutes
- Country: Argentina
- Languages: Spanish; English

The Match (Spanish: El Partido) is a 2026 Argentine sports documentary film written and directed by Juan Cabral and Santiago Franco, based on the non-fiction book of same name by Andrés Burgo. It reconstructs the historic match Argentina vs England at the 1986 FIFA World Cup quarter-finals, famously remembered for the the hand of God goal by Maradona. Also exploring the sporting, political, and cultural dimensions of the encounter, in the background of the recent deadly Falklands War (Spanish: Guerra de las Malvinas) between the two countries.

The film had its world premiere at the Cannes Premiere section of the 2026 Cannes Film Festival on 13 May, where it was nominated for the L'Œil d'or. It was theatrically released in Argentina by Buena Vista International on 21 May, coinciding with the commemorations of the 40th anniversary of the match.

== Premise ==
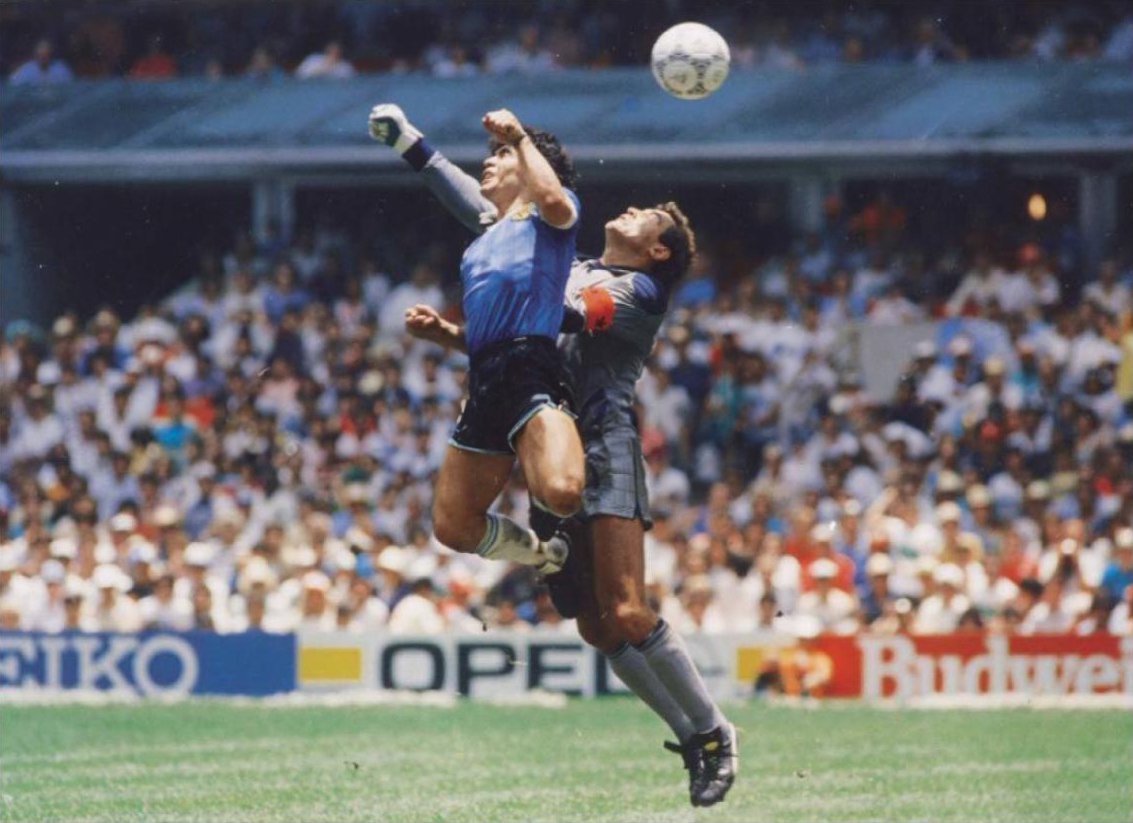
Diego Maradona's hand of God at the 1986 FIFA World Cup.

June 1986, exactly four years after the Falklands War (Spanish: Guerra de las Malvinas) between Argentina and the United Kingdom, the quarter-finals of the 1986 FIFA World Cup in Mexico placed face to face Argentina v England. Both countries already had a strained football relationship since the 1966 FIFA World Cup (held and won by England), referred to in Argentina as el robo del siglo (the theft of the century).

On 2 April 1982, the Argentine Military Dictatorship had invaded the Falkland Islands (Spanish: Islas Malvinas), a small archipelago in the South Atlantic, ruled as British overseas territory; Argentina had claimed it since 1833. The United Kingdom responded by sending a naval task force which recaptured the islands. The war had led to a rapid deterioration in both countries relations after it ended in an unprecedented bloodbath in South America. The episode was heavily influenced by Thatcherism, boosting the popularity of the controversial prime-minister. Following the game, Maradona stated: "Although we had said before the game that football had nothing to do with the Malvinas war, we knew they had killed a lot of Argentine boys there, killed them like little birds. And this was revenge".

Before the game fans from both countries had several fights in the streets of Mexico City and inside Estadio Azteca. As a result, numerous English fans were hospitalized while some of their flags were stolen by Argentine barra bravas.

The match was also marked by two of the most well-known goals in football history, both scored by Argentina captain Diego Maradona: the first was "the hand of God" which he scored by using his hand (the goal was confirmed since the referees supposedly did not see the movement, but was broadcast live worldwide creating an unprecedented turmoil); the second goal came after Maradona dribble past five England players, Peter Beardsley, Peter Reid, Terry Butcher, Terry Fenwick and the goalkeeper Peter Shilton, the movement was labeled as the "Goal of the Century". Argentina won the match, thus eliminating England.

Argentina went on to win the World Cup after a disputed final against West Germany. Maradona won the golden ball for best player of the tournament; England's goalscorer Gary Lineker won the golden boot for being the tournament's top scorer. Argentina went 36 years without a new title (until 2022), while England continues without a new title for over 60 years (since 1966).

== Cast ==
The film features former footballers and participants from the match, including:

- Gary Lineker
- John Barnes
- Jorge Burruchaga
- Jorge Valdano
- Oscar Ruggeri
- Peter Shilton
- Ricardo Giusti
- Julio Olarticoechea

== Production ==
The film was produced by Industria del Milagro.

== Release ==
The film had its world premiere at the Cannes Premiere section of the 2026 Cannes Film Festival on 13 May, where it was nominated for the L'Œil d'or. It was theatrically released in Argentina by Buena Vista International on 21 May, coinciding with the commemorations of the 40th anniversary of the match. It also opened the 60th Karlovy Vary International Film Festival on 3 July 2026. It was later screened in the Dealing with the Past section of the 32nd Sarajevo Film Festival in August 2026.

The film was screened for Japanese Premiere on 28 October 2026 in the World Focus section of the 39th Tokyo International Film Festival.

== Reception ==
The film received a positive critical reception following its premiere at the 2026 Cannes Film Festival and its theatrical release. Internationally, Siddhant Adlakha of Variety described it as "one of the most absorbing and accessible documentaries ever made about the sport", while Stephen Dalton of The Times wrote that "the filmmakers work impressively hard to speak to something bigger than football," highlighting "the healing, unifying power of sport."

In Argentina, Pablo O. Scholz of Clarín wrote that the film "is not only for football fans" and described it as "a great film that moves the audience through admirable filmmaking techniques and a sense of nobility." Diego Lerer of Micropsia praised the documentary for using the 1986 Argentina–England match as a starting point to reflect on memory, national identity, politics, and war, considering it a work that transcends the sporting event itself.

== See also ==
- Argentina–England football rivalry
- Dirty War
- The hand of God
- Thatcherism
