= Andrés Burgo =

Argentine sports journalist

- Burgo in 2026
- Born: August 24, 1974 (age 52); Buenos Aires, Argentina
- Occupations: Journalist, author
- Writing career
- Notable work: El Partido (2016)

Andrés Burgo (born 20 August 1974) is an Argentine sports journalist and author born in Buenos Aires.

== Career ==
Born on 20 August 1974, Burgo is best known for his work on his favourite association football club, CA River Plate, an area where he has been described by fellow journalist Alejandro Duchini as "one of the club's major literary figures". His career as a journalist has seen him pass through several media outlets; Burgo has worked for El País, TyC Sports, elDiario, Página/12, La Nación, and Tiempo Argentino.

He published the book El Partido in 2016, based on the 1986 quarter-final match between Argentina and England. Ten years later, his work caught the attention of directors Juan Cabral and Santiago Franco, who worked together to release a homonym film adaption of the book. In the Cannes Film Festival, it was nominated for the L'Œil d'or, the festival's award for documentaries.

== Works ==
- Gantman, Marcelo; Burgo, Andrés (2005). Diego Dijo: Las Mejores 1000 Frases De Toda La Carrera Del 10. Distal SRL. ISBN 978-987-502-173-0.
- Burgo, Andrés (1 December 2011). Ser de River. En las buenas y en las malas: Agonía, descenso y resurrección desde la tribuna (in Spanish). SUDAMERICANA. ISBN 978-950-07-3725-8.
- Burgo, Andrés; Wall, Alejandro (2014). El último Maradona: cuando a Diego le cortaron las piernas (in Spanish). Buenos Aires: Aguilar. ISBN 978-987-04-3447-4. OCLC 952360979.
- Burgo, Andrés (2016). El partido (in Spanish). Tusquets Argentina. ISBN 978-987-670-640-7.
- Burgo, Andrés (13 February 2019). La final de nuestras vidas (in Spanish). Planeta Argentina. ISBN 978-950-49-6594-7.
- Burgo, Andrés (1 June 2023). Nuestro Mundial: Una historia íntima de cómo nos volvimos a enamorar de la selección argentina (in Spanish). AGUILAR. ISBN 978-987-735-326-6.
- Burgo, Andrés (1 April 2026). Este es el famoso River. 125 años - Historias desconocidas de títulos, jugadores, camisetas, banderas y canciones (in Spanish). Planeta Argentina. ISBN 978-950-49-9734-4.
