= Pepita the Gunslinger =

- Theatrical release poster
- Spanish: Pepita, La Pistolera
- Directed by: Lucía Puenzo
- Written by: Lucía Puenzo; Andrés Gelós; Tatiana Mereñuk
- Story by: Lucas Jinkis
- Produced by: Lucas Jinkis; Lucía Puenzo; Esteban Puenzo; Cabe Bossi; Pol Bossi; Luisana Lopilato; Javier Furgang
- Starring: Luisana Lopilato; Claudio Tolcachir; Alberto Ajaka; Charo López; Marcelo Subiotto; Camila Peralta; Esteban Bigliardi; Gustavo Bassani
- Cinematography: Iván Gierasinchuk
- Production companies: Zeppelin Studios; Historias Cinematográficas; Pampa Films; Life Is One; The Remake
- Distributed by: Buena Vista International
- Release date: 3 September 2026
- Country: Argentina
- Language: Spanish

Pepita the Gunslinger (Spanish: Pepita, La Pistolera) is a 2026 Argentine biographical crime thriller film directed by Lucía Puenzo, starring Luisana Lopilato in the title role.

== Plot ==
Set in 1985 Mar del Plata, the plot follows the breakthrough of a pregnant sex-worker in the Argentine criminal underbelly.

== Cast ==
- Luisana Lopilato as Margarita Di Tullio, aka Pepita la pistolera
- Claudio Tolcachir as Germán
- Alberto Ajaka as Cuervo
- Charo López as Nemeca
- Marcelo Subiotto as juez Perkins
- Camila Peralta as Vicky
- Esteban Bigliardi as Américo
- Gustavo Bassani as Tarta

== Production ==
The film was produced by Zeppelin Studios, Historias Cinematográficas, Pampa Films, Life Is One, and The Remake. It was shot in Mar del Plata in 2025.

== Release ==
Film Factory secured international sales right to the film ahead of the 2026 European Film Market. Distributed by Buena Vista International, it was released theatrically in Argentina on 3 September 2026. Buena Vista also acquired distribution rights for the rest of Latin America and the United States.

== Reception ==
Guillermo Courau of La Nación rated the film 4 out of 5 stars ('very good'), welcoming how "it goes beyond a mere crime story to reveal itself as a powerful and dark melodrama".

== See also ==
- List of Argentine films of 2026
