= Carmelo Simeone =

Argentine association footballer

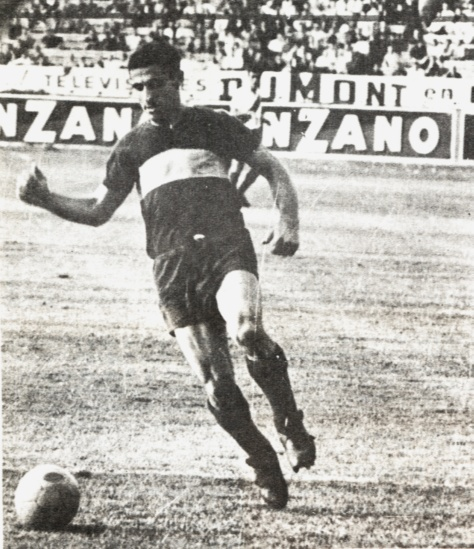
- Simeone at Boca Juniors

Personal information
- Date of birth: 22 September 1934
- Place of birth: Ciudadela, Argentina
- Date of death: 11 October 2014 (aged 80)
- Place of death: Buenos Aires, Argentina
- Height: 1.70 m (5 ft 7 in)
- Position: Defender

Senior career*
Years	Team	Apps	(Gls)
1955–1961	Vélez Sársfield	164	(0)
1962–1967	Boca Juniors	152	(1)
1968–?	Sportivo Belgrano	?	(?)

International career
1959–1966	Argentina	22	(0)
- * Club domestic league appearances and goals as of March 2008

Carmelo "Cholo" Simeone, (22 September 1934 – 11 October 2014) was an Argentine football defender who won three league championships with Boca Juniors and played for the Argentina national team. Nicknamed "Cholo", he was known for his energetic playing style.

== Club career ==
Simeone started his playing career in 1955 with Vélez Sársfield. In 1961 he joined Boca Juniors where he was an important defensive player in the teams that won the Argentine Primera in 1962, 1964 and 1965. Simeone left Boca In 1967 and spent some time playing for Sportivo Belgrano in the lower leagues of Argentine football.

== International career ==
Simeone represented Argentina in their victorious Copa América campaign in 1959, and at the 1966 FIFA World Cup; in total he made 22 appearances for the national side between 1959 and 1966.

== Honours ==
=== Club ===
Boca Juniors

- Primera División Argentina: 1962, 1964, 1965
- Copa Libertadores runner-up: 1963

=== Argentina ===
- Copa América: 1959
- Taça das Nações: 1964
