= The Virgin of the Quarry Lake =

- Argentinian theatrical release poster
- Spanish: La virgen de la tosquera
- Directed by: Laura Casabé
- Screenplay by: Benjamín Naishtat
- Based on: "El carrito" and "La virgen de la tosquera" by Mariana Enríquez
- Produced by: Valeria Bistagnino; Tomás Eloy Muñoz Lázaro; Alejandro Israel; Diego Martínez Ulanosky; Ángeles Hernández; David Matamoros; Livi Herrera
- Starring: Dolores Oliverio; Fernanda Echevarría; Luisa Merelas; Isabel Bracamonte; Candela Flores; Agustín Sosa; Dady Brieva
- Cinematography: Diego Tenorio Hernández
- Edited by: Miguel Schverdfinger; Ana Remón
- Music by: Pedro Onetto; Fabián Aranda
- Production companies: Ajimolido Films; Mostra Cine; Caponeto; Mr. Miyagi
- Distributed by: BF Paris (Argentina); Filmax (Spain)
- Release dates: 27 January 2025 (Sundance); 15 January 2026 (Argentina); 23 January 2026 (Spain)
- Running time: 93 minutes
- Countries: Argentina; Mexico; Spain
- Language: Spanish

The Virgin of the Quarry Lake (Spanish: La virgen de la tosquera) is a 2025 supernatural coming-of-age horror film directed by Laura Casabé, written by Benjamín Naishtat and based on two stories by Mariana Enríquez. A co-production of Argentina, Mexico, and Spain, it stars Dolores Oliverio, Augustín Sosa, Isabel Bracamonte, and Candela Flores.

The film had its world premiere at the World Cinema Dramatic Competition of the 2025 Sundance Film Festival on 27 January. It was theatrically released in Argentina by BF Paris on 15 January 2026. It was also as the Argentine entry for Best International Feature Film at the 99th Academy Awards.

== Plot ==
Set in 2001, against the backdrop of the deep economic crisis and protests in Argentina, the plot follows three teenagers (Natalia, Mariela, and Josefina) who become infatuated with the same boy, Diego. The situation takes a turn when Diego starts a relationship with older and more experienced Silvia and Natalia casts a spell against the couple with help from her grandmother Rita.

== Cast ==
- Dolores Oliverio as Natalia
- Agustín Sosa as Diego
- Isabel Bracamonte as Josefina
- Candela Flores as Mariela
- Luisa Merelas as Rita
- Fernanda Echevarría as Silvia
- Dady Brieva

== Production ==
The film is based on the stories "El carrito" and "La virgen de la tosquera" by Mariana Enríquez, both contained in the story collection The Dangers of Smoking in Bed. It is an Argentine-Mexican-Spanish co-production by Mostra Cine, Ajimolido Films, Caponeto and Mr. Miyagi Films, and obtained financing from the 2023 Ibermedia co-production fund.

Casabé lamented the ongoing situation in Argentina vis-à-vis State film policies, claiming that filmmakers were "living under ideological persecution", with only international co-production with Mexico and Spain saving the project.

Shooting locations included the Mendoza Province.

== Release ==
In May 2024, it was reported that Filmax had acquired international rights to the film.

Selected in the film slate of the 2025 Sundance Film Festival, the film had its world premiere at the Egyptian Theatre on 27 January 2025. It also made it to the Argentine competition strand of the 26th BAFICI, and to the programme of the 58th Sitges Film Festival. Distributed by BF Paris, the film was scheduled to be released theatrically in Argentina on 30 October 2025. During the film's Sitges presentation the Argentine theatrical release date was set for 15 January 2026. It had about 84,999 admissions in the Argentine box office. Filmax programmed a 23 January 2026 theatrical release in Spain.

== Reception ==
=== Critical response ===
On the review aggregator website Rotten Tomatoes, 84% of 32 critics' reviews are positive, with an average rating of 7.5/10.

Chris Deacy of Journal of Religion & Film deemed the film to be a "beguiling and increasingly shocking interrogation of adolescent angst", otherwise displaying shades of Carrie and reminiscences of The Virgin Suicides.

Martin Kudláč of Cineuropa described the film as venturing "into the darker zones of coming-of-age spiced up by the visceral impact associated with the New French Extremity".

Chad Collins of Dread Central rated the film 4 out of 5 stars, declaring it a "an uncommonly frightening and tragic coming-of-age saga", displaying "bouts of violence" and "a sharp folkloric edge".

Guy Lodge of Variety wrote that the film "captures a stretch of both national and individual turmoil".

The Argentine Academy of Cinematography Arts and Sciences chose the film as the Argentine submission for the Goya Award for Best Ibero-American Film at the 41st Goya Awards.

=== Accolades ===
Award / Festival	Date of ceremony	Category	Recipient(s)	Result	Ref.
Sitges Film Festival	18 October 2025	Best Cinematography	Diego Tenorio	Won	
Forqué Awards	19 December 2026	Best Latin American Film		Pending	

== See also ==
- List of Argentine films of 2026
- List of Spanish films of 2026
- List of submissions to the 99th Academy Awards for Best International Feature Film
- List of Argentine submissions for the Academy Award for Best International Feature Film
