= Pedro Prospitti =

Argentine footballer (1941–1996)

Personal information
- Date of birth: 24 July 1941
- Place of birth: Allen, Río Negro, Argentina
- Date of death: 24 November 1996 (aged 55)
- Place of death: Allen, Río Negro, Argentina
- Position: Forward

Youth career
- Unión Alem Progresista

Senior career*
Years	Team	Apps	(Gls)
1961	Estudiantes		
1962	San Lorenzo		
1963	Estudiantes		
1964	Independiente		
1965–1966	Nacional		
1966	River Plate		
1966	São Paulo		
1967	Quilmes		
1968–1969	Santa Fe		
1970–1971	Millonarios		
1972	Emelec		
1973	Once Caldas		

International career
1964	Argentina	4	(2)
- * Club domestic league appearances and goals

Pedro Prospitti (24 July 1941 – 24 November 1996) was an Argentine professional footballer who played as a forward.

== Club career ==
Prospitti began his professional career at the age of 21 at Estudiantes. He played for San Lorenzo, and in 1964 for Independiente where he was part of the team which won the 1964 Copa Libertadores. He also had spells outside Argentina, playing for Nacional, São Paulo, Santa Fe, Millonarios, Emelec and Once Caldas, where he ended his career.

== International career ==
Prospitti also played three matches for Argentina, during the 1964 Nations Cup.

== Honours ==
Independiente

- Copa Libertadores: 1964

Nacional

- Torneo Cuadrangular: 1964
- Torneo Fermín Garicoits: 1965

Emelec

- Ecuadorian Serie A: 1972

Argentina

- Taça das Nações: 1964
- Copa Chevallier Boutell: 1964
