= Taça das Nações =

Tournament details
- Host country: Brazil
- Cities: Rio de Janeiro, São Paulo
- Dates: 30 May – 7 June 1964
- Teams: 4 (from 2 confederations)
- Venues: 2 (in 2 host cities)

Final positions
- Champions: Argentina (1st title)
- Runners-up: Brazil
- Third place: Portugal
- Fourth place: England

Tournament statistics
- Matches played: 6
- Goals scored: 19 (3.17 per match)
- Attendance: 277,000 (46,167 per match)
- Top scorer(s): Five players (2 goals each)

The Taça das Nações (Portuguese for "Nations' Cup") or "Little World Cup" was a football tournament played in Brazil in 1964 to celebrate the 50th anniversary of the founding of the Brazilian Football Confederation. Three international teams were invited, Argentina, Portugal and England, for the competition which was played in Rio de Janeiro and São Paulo during late May and early June.

== History ==
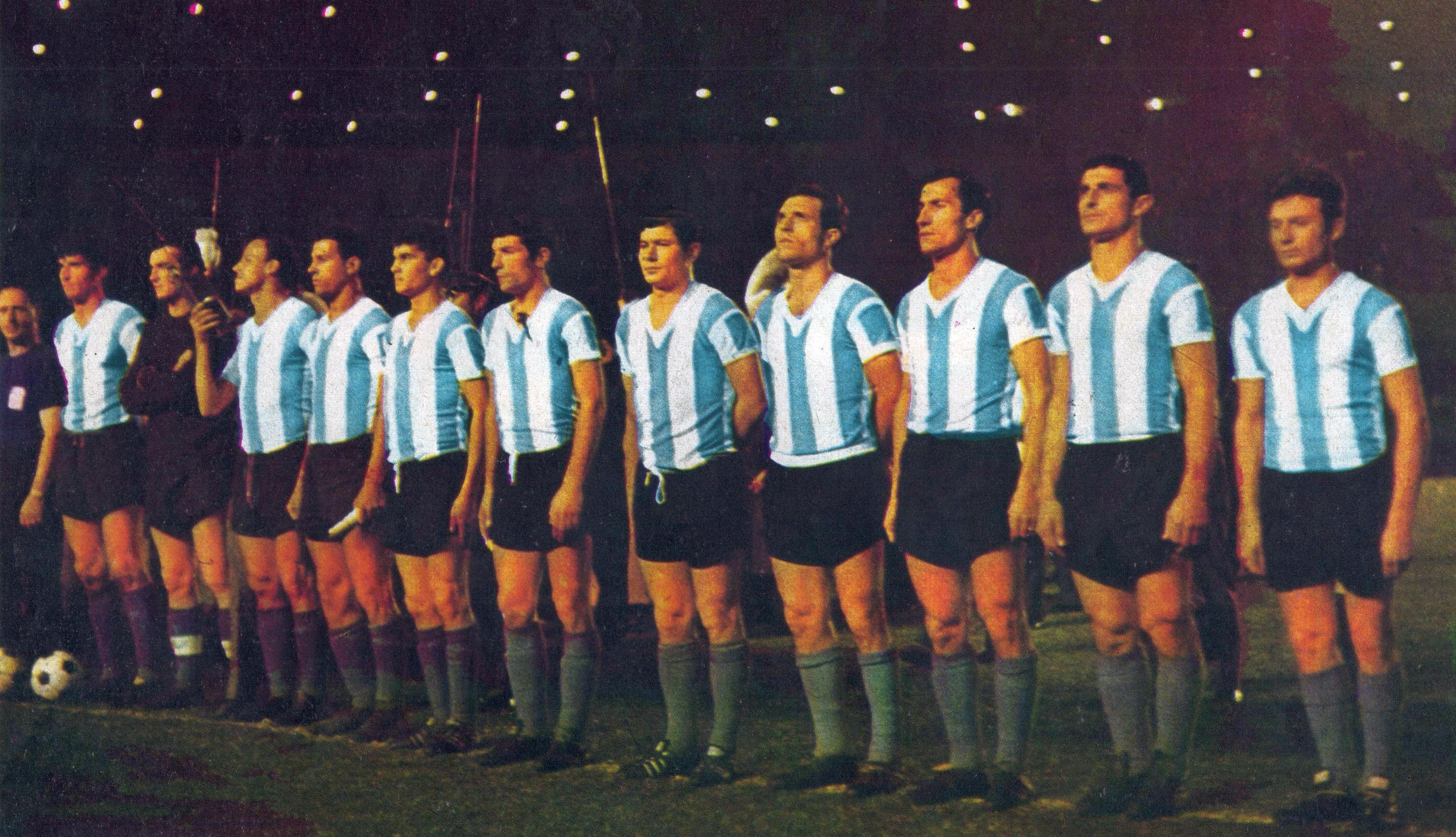
The Argentina team that won the competition

The tournament was intended to showcase the favourites for the upcoming 1966 FIFA World Cup hosted by England. The Brazilian squad – apart from Pelé – had notable players such as Gérson, Jairzinho and goalkeeper Gilmar. Argentina, coached by José María Minella, included some experienced players such as Amadeo Carrizo, José Varacka, José Ramos Delgado, Alfredo Rojas and Antonio Rattín and young footballers such as Alberto Rendo and Roberto Telch. Silvio Marzolini did not participate due to being injured. The English team included Bobby Charlton, Bobby Moore and Gordon Banks while most of Portugal's players were from Benfica, that had won the European Champions' Cup twice, with Eusébio as its most notable star.

In the match between England and Brazil, Pelé devastated the England defence with skill and hard running, leaving England forward Jimmy Greaves to remark, "Pelé is on another bloody planet." The England vs. Portugal game was also notable for being marred by controversy when Portuguese player José Torres attempted to punch the referee for disallowing an offside Portuguese goal. The player was sent off, but was considered lucky not to face a lifetime ban from football. In another violent incident, a headbutt by Pelé broke the nose of the Argentine player José Agustín Messiano, who had to be replaced by Roberto Telch – who proceeded to score two goals in the game.

The Argentine team eventually won the tournament after defeating Brazil 3–0 in their game in São Paulo, with goals by Telch (2) and Ermindo Onega. Argentine goalkeeper Amadeo Carrizo stopped a penalty by Gerson.

Reportedly the Brazilian FA had already engraved the Brazilian player's names on the watches intended as prizes for the winning team.

== Results ==
30 May 1964

Brazil	5–1	England
Rinaldo 35', 59'; Pelé 63'; Julinho 68'; Roberto Dias 88'		Greaves 49'

Maracanã Stadium, Rio de Janeiro
Attendance: 77,000
Referee: Pierre Schwinte (France)

31 May 1964

Argentina	2–0	Portugal
Rojas 58'; Rendo 89'

Maracanã Stadium, Rio de Janeiro
Attendance: 40,000
Referee: Leo Horn (Netherlands)

3 June 1964

Brazil	0–3	Argentina
		Onega 38'; Telch 61', 89'

Pacaembu Stadium, São Paulo
Attendance: 60,000
Referee: Gottfried Dienst (Switzerland)

Team details

Brazil
Argentina

GK		Gilmar
DF		Carlos Alberto
DF		Brito
DF		Joel Camargo
MF		Rildo
MF		Roberto Dias
FW		Gérson
FW		Julinho
FW		Vavá
FW	10	Pelé
FW		Rinaldo
Manager:
(Brazil) Vicente Feola

GK		Amadeo Carrizo
DF	4	Carmelo Simeone
DF		José Ramos Delgado
DF		José Varacka
DF		Abel Vieitez
MF		Alberto Rendo
MF		Antonio Rattín
MF	11	José Mesiano	(substituted off) a'
MF		Ermindo Onega
FW		Pedro Prospitti
FW	10	Alfredo Rojas
Substitutes:
MF		Roberto Telch	(substituted on) a'
Manager:
(Argentina) José María Minella

4 June 1964

England	1–1	Portugal
Hunt 57'		Peres 40'

Pacaembu Stadium, São Paulo
Attendance: 25,000
Referee: Armando Marques (Brazil)

6 June 1964

Argentina	1–0	England
Rojas 66'

Maracanã Stadium, Rio de Janeiro
Attendance: 15,000
Referee: Leo Horn (Netherlands)

Team details

Argentina
England

GK	Amadeo Carrizo
DF	José Ramos Delgado
DF	Miguel Angel Vidal
DF	Carmelo Simeone
MF	Abel Vieitez
MF	Antonio Rattín
FW	Ermindo Onega
FW	Alberto Rendo
FW	Pedro Prospitti	(substituted off) a'
FW	Alfredo Rojas
FW	Roberto Telch
Substitutes:
FW	Mario Chaldú	(substituted on) a'
Manager:
(Argentina) José María Minella

GK	Gordon Banks
DF	Bobby Thompson
DF	Gordon Milne
DF	Ray Wilson
MF	Maurice Norman
MF	Bobby Moore
FW	Peter Thompson
FW	George Eastham
FW	Bobby Charlton
FW	Johnny Byrne
FW	Jimmy Greaves
Manager:
(England) Alfred Ramsey

7 June 1964

Brazil	4–1	Portugal
Pelé 10'; Jairzinho 21'; Gérson 76', 80'		Coluna 27'

Maracanã Stadium, Rio de Janeiro
Attendance: 60,000
Referee: Pierre Schwinte (France)

== Final table ==
Team	Pts	Pld	W	D	L	GF	GA	GD
Argentina	6	3	3	0	0	6	0	+6
Brazil	4	3	2	0	1	9	5	+4
England	1	3	0	1	2	2	7	−5
Portugal	1	3	0	1	2	2	7	−5

The points system gave 2 points for a win and 1 point for a draw.

Taça das Nações

Argentina
First title

== Statistics ==
=== Goalscorers ===
There were 19 goals scored in 6 matches, for an average of 3.17 goals per match.

2 goals

- (Argentina) Alfredo Rojas
- (Argentina) Roberto Telch
- (Brazil) Rinaldo
- (Brazil) Pelé
- (Brazil) Gérson

1 goal

- (Argentina) Alberto Rendo
- (Argentina) Ermindo Onega
- (Brazil) Júlio Botelho
- (Brazil) Roberto Dias
- (Brazil) Jairzinho
- (England) Jimmy Greaves
- (England) Roger Hunt
- (Portugal) Fernando Peres
- (Portugal) Mário Coluna
