= Rinaldo Amorim =

Brazilian footballer

Rinaldo
Personal information
- Full name: Rinaldo Luís Dias Amorim
- Date of birth: 19 February 1941
- Place of birth: Jurema, Brazil
- Date of death: 5 April 2023 (aged 82)
- Place of death: Carpina, Brazil
- Position: Left winger

Senior career*
| Years | Team | Apps | (Gls) |
| 1960–1963 | Náutico | | |
| 1964–1968 | Palmeiras | 167 | (60) |
| 1967 | → Fluminense (loan) | 23 | (12) |
| 1969–1971 | Coritiba | | |
| 1972 | União Barbarense | | |

International career
| 1964–1967 | Brazil | 11 | (5) |

Managerial career
- 1997: Treze
- * Club domestic league appearances and goals as of 18 February 2024

Rinaldo Luís Dias Amorim (19 February 1939 – 5 April 2023), also known as Rinaldo Amorim or simply Rinaldo, was a Brazilian professional footballer who played as a left winger.

== Career ==
Rinaldo began his professional career at Náutico, a club where he became a great idol and was twice state champion. He was signed by Palmeiras where he also made history and became one of the best in history, with 167 matches and 60 goals. He also had a good spell at Fluminense, Coritiba and ended his career at União Barbarense in 1972.

== International career ==
Rinaldo debuted for the Brazil national team in the 1964 Taça das Nações. In total, he made 11 appearances and scored 5 goals, playing for the last time in 1967, in a friendly against Chile.

== Honours ==
Náutico

- Campeonato Pernambucano: 1960, 1963

Palmeiras

- Torneio Rio-São Paulo: 1965
- Campeonato Paulista: 1966
- Torneio Roberto Gomes Pedrosa: 1967
- Taça Brasil: 1967

== Death ==
Rinaldo died in the city of Carpina, Pernambuco on 5 April 2023.
