= Alberto Rendo =

Argentine footballer

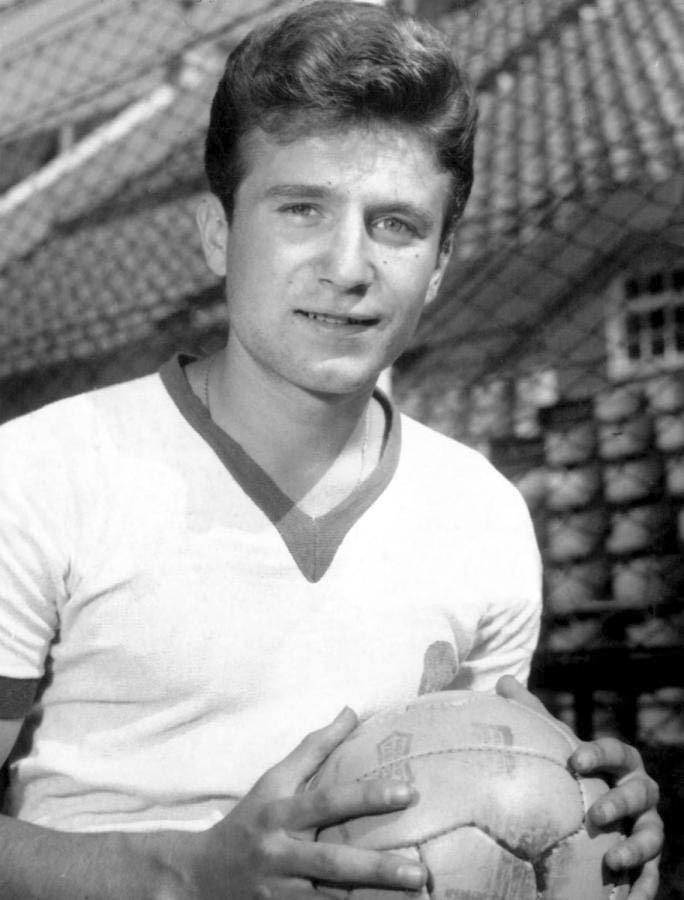
- Rendo c. 1959-64.

Personal information
- Date of birth: 3 January 1940 (age 86)
- Place of birth: Buenos Aires, Argentina
- Height: 1.63 m (5 ft 4 in)
- Position: Midfielder

Senior career*
Years	Team	Apps	(Gls)
- Huracán
- San Lorenzo
- Huracán
1971–1972	Laguna		

International career
1960–1969	Argentina	18	(9)
- * Club domestic league appearances and goals

Alberto Rendo (born 3 January 1940) is an Argentine former footballer who competed in the 1960 Summer Olympics.

== Career ==
Born in Parque Patricios, Buenos Aires, Rendo played club football in the Argentine Primera División with Huracán and San Lorenzo. He finished his career in the Mexican Primera División with Laguna.
