= Alfredo Rojas (Argentine footballer) =

Argentine footballer (1937–2023)

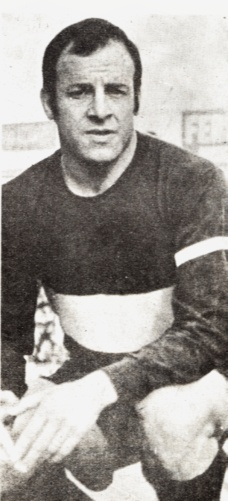
- Rojas during his tenure on Boca Juniors, c. 1964-68

Personal information
- Full name: Alfredo Hugo Rojas Delinge
- Date of birth: 20 February 1937
- Place of birth: Lanús, Argentina
- Date of death: 16 June 2023 (aged 86)
- Position: Striker

Senior career*
Years	Team	Apps	(Gls)
1956–1958	Lanús	58	(41)
1958–1959	Celta Vigo	7	(1)
1959–1961	Real Betis	47	(18)
1961	River Plate	3	(2)
1962–1964	Gimnasia de La Plata	81	(35)
1964–1968	Boca Juniors	102	(46)
1969	Peñarol		
1970–1971	O'Higgins	43	(15)
1972	Universidad Católica	14	(4)

International career
1958–1966	Argentina	15	(1)

Managerial career
- 1977: Santiago Wanderers
- 1979: Portuguesa
- * Club domestic league appearances and goals

Alfredo Hugo Rojas Delinge, nicknamed El Tanque (20 February 1937 – 16 June 2023) was an Argentine professional footballer who played as a striker.

== Career ==
Rojas was born in Lanús, Buenos Aires Province. He started playing with Club Atlético Lanús in 1958, but his participation in the 1958 FIFA World Cup opened a door to Europe for him. He joined Celta de Vigo in mid-1959, but the club was relegated, Rojas moved on to play for Real Betis in 1959.

Rojas returned to Argentina after signing for River Plate, but he spent most of the time sitting on the bench. It was not until 1962, when he moved to Club de Gimnasia y Esgrima La Plata, that El Tanque gained some importance in the Argentine football, scoring 17 goals. After another season with the team from La Plata, Rojas was transferred to Boca Juniors.

Nicknamed El Tanque ("the tank") Rojas played four seasons with Boca Juniors, winning the 1965 Argentine Championship, and becoming one of the most important and beloved Boca players of the 1960s. From 1964 to 1968 he played 102 league matches, scoring 46 goals.

In 1968 Boca Juniors released Rojas. After a stint with Uruguayan club Peñarol, he ended his career playing for O'Higgins (1970–1971) and Universidad Católica (1972) in Chile.

With the Argentina national team, Rojas played in the 1958 and 1966 FIFA World Cup, and won the 1964 Taça das Nações (Nations Cup).

== Death ==
Rojas died from a heart attack on 16 June 2023, at the age of 86.

== Honours ==
Boca Juniors

- Primera División: 1965

Argentina

- Taça das Nações: 1964
