= Juan Cabral (director) =

Argentine writer and director

- Born: 1978 (age 47–48); Argentina
- Education: University of Buenos Aires
- Occupations: Film director, commercial director, music video director
- Years active: 2000–present

Juan Cabral (born, 1978) is an Argentine writer and director, whose work includes feature films, music videos and commercials. He is known for directing the Gorilla advertisement for Cadbury and for creating the Sony Bravia advertising campaigns.

Cabral has been written about in The Guardian and The Independent and was also included in The Evening Standard 'London's 100 most influential people' list.

== Career ==
Cabral studied graphic design at the University of Buenos Aires before beginning his career in advertising at Agulla & Baccetti, where he worked on the commercial Bostezos for Telecom Argentina.

Cabral wrote and directed Gorilla for Cadbury - voted 'Favourite Ad of all time' in the UK. He is also the creator of the Sony Bravia Trilogy (Balls, Paint and Playdoh).

In 2011, Cabral joined the international production company MJZ, where he works as a commercial director.

His first feature film, Two/One, premiered at the Tribeca Film Festival and was released globally on MUBI in 2020. The film stars Boyd Holbrook, Song Yang, Zhu Zhu and Beau Bridges.

His second feature film, Risa and the Wind Phone (Risa y la cabina del viento), starring Diego Peretti, Cazzu, Joaquín Furriel and Elena Romero, premiered at the Mar del Plata International Film Festival, where it won Best Argentine Film and Best Director.

His third film, The Match (Spanish: El Partido), directed and written by Juan Cabral and Santiago Franco, is a documentary based on the book by Andrés Burgo that recounts the historic 1986 World Cup match in Mexico following the Falklands War. The film was selected as part of the official selection of the 79th 2026 Cannes Film Festival, where it will have its international premiere, and is scheduled for theatrical release on 21 May 2026, coinciding with the 40th anniversary of the match.

== Awards and recognition ==
Cabral has received major international advertising awards, including the Black Pencil from D&AD and two Grand Prix awards at Cannes Lions.

His feature film Risa and the Wind Phone won Best Argentine Film and Best Director at the Mar del Plata International Film Festival.

In 2014, his advertisement for Ikea (Beds) was awarded Best Commercial of the Year by the British Television Advertising Awards and named Best Campaign of the Year by Campaign magazine.

In 2017, he received the Konex Platinum Award in Advertising.

== Filmography ==
=== Feature films ===
Year	Title	Role	Notes
2019	Two/One	Director and writer	Premiered at the Tribeca Film Festival and released globally on MUBI.
2025	Risa and the Wind Phone	Director and writer	Co-written with Pablo Minces. Premiered at the Mar del Plata International Film Festival.https://www.filo.news/noticia/2025/11/16/risa-y-la-cabina-del-viento-y-calle-malaga-dominan-los-premios-del-40-festival-de-cine-de-mar-del-plata
2026	The Match (El Partido)	Director and writer	Selected for the Cannes Premiere section at the 2026 Cannes Film Festival.
