= Risa and the Wind Phone =

- Directed by: Juan Cabral
- Screenplay by: Pablo Minces; Juan Cabral
- Produced by: Flora Fernández Marengo
- Starring: Diego Peretti; Cazzu; Joaquín Furriel; Elena Romero
- Cinematography: Leandro Filloy
- Edited by: Emiliano Fardaus
- Music by: Diego Tuñon
- Production companies: Labhouse; Industria del Milagro
- Distributed by: Digicine
- Release date: 10 November 2025
- Running time: 97 minutes
- Country: Argentina
- Language: Spanish

Risa and The Wind Phone is a 2025 Argentine fantasy drama film directed by Juan Cabral. The feature marks the film acting debut of Cazzu, alongside Diego Peretti, Elena Romero, and Joaquín Furriel. The film features original music by Babasónicos and had its world premiere on November 10, 2025, at the 40th edition of the Mar del Plata International Film Festival, where it won Best Film and Best Director in the Argentine Competition.

Shot in Ushuaia and produced by Labhouse and Industria del Milagro, the film tells the story of a young girl who discovers a telephone booth that allows her to speak with the dead. By fulfilling their requests, she hopes to eventually make contact with her deceased father.

== Plot ==
The story follows Risa, a ten-year-old girl who lives in a remote area of Ushuaia with her mother Sara, who works full-time. During the school holidays, Sara asks her neighbor Esteban—an alcoholic man struggling with depression—to look after her daughter while she is at work. Risa becomes intrigued by an apparently out-of-service telephone booth near her house. One day, she begins to hear the voices of deceased people asking for help to resolve unfinished matters. By granting their requests, she believes she will be able to speak with her father, who died in a tragic fire.

== Cast ==
- Elena Romero as Risa
- Cazzu as Sara
- Diego Peretti as Esteban
- Joaquín Furriel as Rodrigo
- Graciela Borges as Greta
- Manuel Da Silva as Milo
- Silvina Sabater as Abigail
- Fabián Casas as Augusto

== Reception ==
=== Critical response ===
Following its premiere at the Mar del Plata International Film Festival, the film won other accolades such as the “Best Youth Film” at the Stockholm International FIlm Festival Junior such and the “Prix du Public” at La fiesta del Cine in France. It also received positive reviews from critics. Film critic Pablo Scholz, from Clarín, noted that the film “has it all: Cazzu, Diego Peretti, and fantastical elements that turn it into a poetic work.” Argentine newspaper Página/12 noted that «the production features meticulous art direction and a screenplay that skillfully weaves the everyday with the fantastical». Bruno Calabrese of Solo fui al cine wrote that «Cabral achieves something unusual: a film that deals with grief without sinking into sadness.» Diego Lerer of Micropsia stated that «the film is visually striking, giving the setting a harsh and rugged beauty».

== Awards and nominations ==
List of awards and nominations
| Festival/Award | Event date | Category | Recipient | Result | Ref. |
|---|---|---|---|---|---|
| Mar del Plata International Film Festival | 6–16 November 2025 | Best Argentine Feature Film | Risa & The Wind Phone | Won | |
| Mar del Plata International Film Festival | 6–16 November 2025 | Best Director | Juan Cabral | Won | |
| Stockholm International Film Festival Junior | 23–29 March 2026 | Best Youth Film | Risa & The Wind Phone | Won | |
