= The hand of God =

Association football goal scored by Diego Maradona

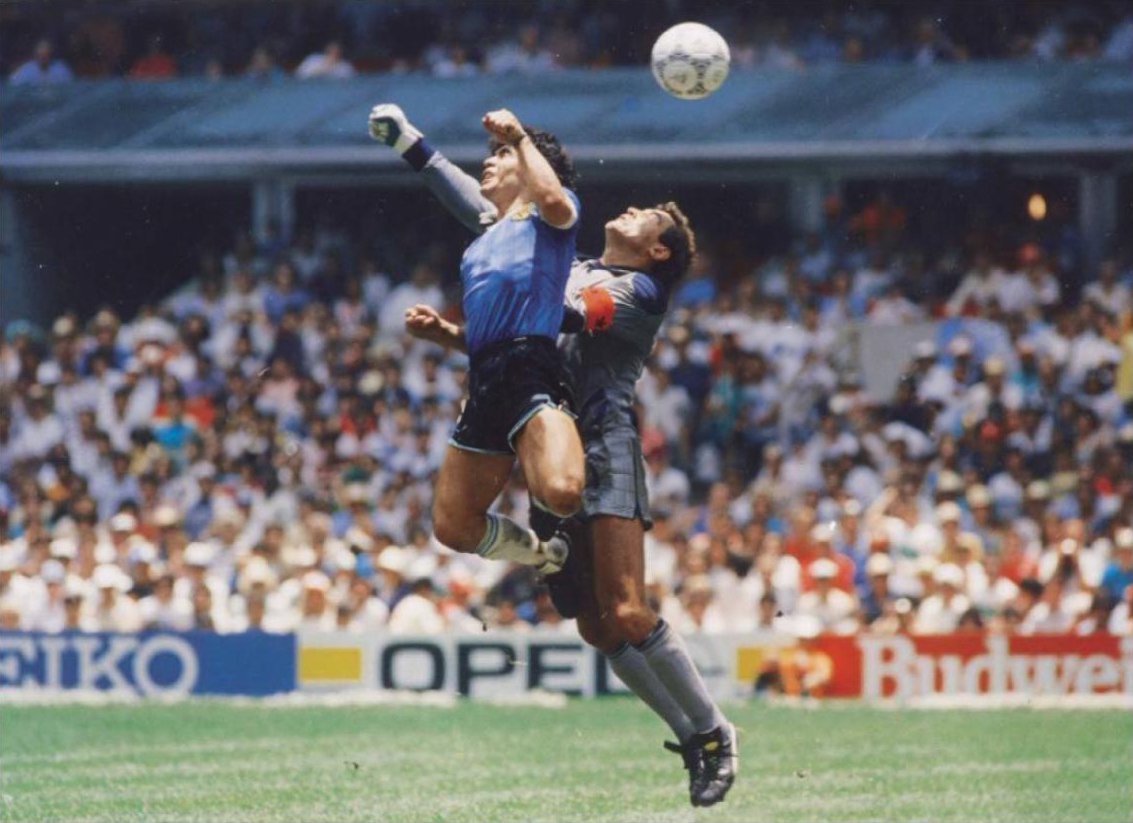
- The moment when Diego Maradona flicks the ball with his hand past the outstretched arm of Peter Shilton
- Native name: La mano de Dios
- Date: 22 June 1986 (Argentina v England match)
- Venue: Estadio Azteca
- Location: Mexico City
- Type: Association football goal
- Participants: Diego Maradona; Peter Shilton

"The Hand of God" (Spanish: La mano de Dios) is the name given to the illegal opening goal awarded to Argentine footballer Diego Maradona during Argentina's victory over England in a quarter-final match at the 1986 FIFA World Cup. The goal was allowed to stand because none of the match referees could see Maradona using his left hand to score the goal. Four minutes after the goal gave Argentina a 1–0 lead in the quarter-final game, Maradona scored a second goal called the "Goal of the Century". Argentina won the match 2–1 en route to winning their second World Cup.

The goal's name derives from Maradona's initial response when asked whether he scored it legally. He said it was "a little with the head of Maradona and a little with the hand of God". Later, Maradona acknowledged he had illegally handled the ball, saying he considered the goal "symbolic revenge" for the United Kingdom's defeat of Argentina in the 1982 Falklands War. In August 2026, the match ball, once owned by referee Ali Ben Nasser, sold at auction for $3.3 million.

== Goal ==
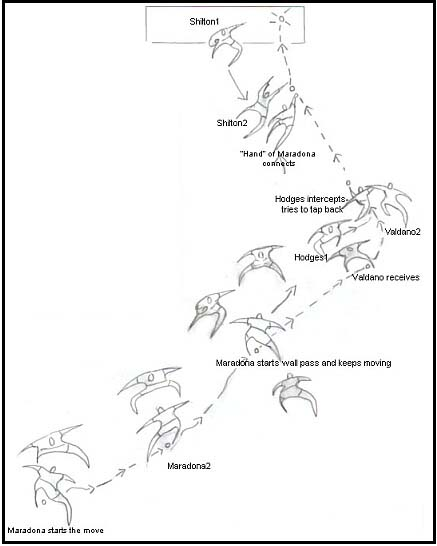
Illustrated sequence of the move of the "hand of God" goal

Six minutes into the second half of the quarter-final game, Maradona took the ball out of the box with his left leg and passed it to teammate Jorge Valdano. Valdano tried to take on several English defenders, but the ball was intercepted, thrown back and forth, and kicked toward England's goal by English midfielder Steve Hodge.

Because of the players' positions, Maradona would have been caught offside, but as the ball came off an opponent, there was no offside offence. Alone inside the penalty box and with the ball dropping down, Maradona contested the ball with goalkeeper Peter Shilton, who stood 20 centimetres (8 inches) taller than Maradona. Shilton jumped forward with his right hand, while Maradona did so with his left arm outstretched. Maradona's fist, which was raised close to his head, struck the ball first, causing the ball to loop over Shilton and into the net. Maradona began to celebrate while glancing sideways at the referee and the linesman for confirmation. He fully celebrated the goal when it was given.

Although the Tunisian referee Ali Ben Nasser initially gave the goal, protests from the English players made him seek advice from his second linesman, who confirmed it.

Maradona later wrote in his autobiogaphy:

Ahora sí puedo contar lo que en aquel momento no podía, lo que en aquel momento definí como «La mano de Dios»... ¿Qué mano de Dios? ¡fue la mano del Diego!

Translation:

Now I can say what I couldn't at that moment, what I defined at that time as The Hand of God. What hand of God? It was the hand of Diego!

— Diego Maradona, His autobiography

Mexican photographer Alejandro Ojeda Carbajal captured the moment in a photograph that unequivocally shows Maradona handling the ball with his left hand moments before scoring.

== Admission ==
In 2005, Maradona admitted on the Argentinean television program La Noche del 10 that he had scored the goal with his hand. Several world media outlets reported Maradona's confession, while Peter Shilton rejected the apology, saying it was too late.

== Symbolism ==
In the 2019 documentary film Diego Maradona directed by Asif Kapadia, Maradona links the event to the Falklands War four years earlier, saying: "We, as Argentinians, didn't know what the military was up to. They told us that we were winning the war. But in reality, England was winning 20–0. It was tough. The hype made it seem like we were going to play out another war. I knew it was my hand. It wasn't my plan but the action happened so fast that the linesman didn't see me putting my hand in. The referee looked at me and he said: 'Goal.' It was a nice feeling like some sort of symbolic revenge against the English."

In 2017, Ivan Lopez-Muniz wrote that, in Argentina, the "entire nation", including the Government and the Argentine Football Association, still "praises the most blatant act of cheating ever caught on tape", partly because "Argentines are humans, and humans are hypocrites" but also because of a long history of Argentine grievances against the UK, including the Falklands War; England manager Alf Ramsay calling the Argentine players "animals" after Argentine captain Antonio Rattín was sent off against England in the 1966 World Cup; Britain's invasions of Buenos Aires in 1806 and 1807; and its reassertion of sovereignty over the Falkland Islands (known to Argentines as Las Malvinas) in 1832.

Other football observers have called the goal a physical embodiment of viveza criolla (roughly, 'native cunning'), a philosophy commonly associated with South America that more or less justifies the path taken to succeed even if it is unfair.

== Subsequent use ==
The "Hand of God" became a popular phrase and is still used around the world. Some other famous football handballs are:

- In a first-round match of the 1990 World Cup between Argentina and the Soviet Union, a Soviet attack failed when Maradona intercepted the ball with his hand without the referee noticing.
- In the 2004 AFC Asian Cup Final between China and Japan, Koji Nakata scored Japan's second goal by hand and it stood, much to the dismay of Chinese fans, as the Chinese hosts lost 3–1 to the eventual champions.
- During a league match against Espanyol on 9 June 2007, Argentinian Barcelona player Lionel Messi scored by launching himself at the ball and striking it with his hand in a fashion similar to Maradona's Hand of God goal.
- During the final minutes of the second leg of the play-off for the 2010 World Cup between Ireland and France, William Gallas scored the decisive goal from a Thierry Henry assist that gave France a 2–1 aggregate victory and qualified it for the World Cup. Controversy followed immediately, as replays showed Henry repeatedly centering the ball with his hands moments before passing the ball to Gallas. Despite protests from the Irish side, Swedish referee Martin Hansson did not admonish Henry and allowed the goal. After the match ended, sports media worldwide gave Henry's cross several nicknames, ranging from "The New Hand of God" to the more scathing "The Hand of Frog", the latter using a pejorative term for French people.
- Uruguayan footballer Luis Suárez illegally stopped a likely goal from Ghanaian Dominic Adiyiah with his hand in the quarter-finals of the 2010 FIFA World Cup. Suárez was shown the red card, but Ghana missed the resulting penalty kick, and Uruguay defeated Ghana in a penalty shoot-out. At the subsequent press conference, Suárez said he had used the "Hand of God", and the stop became popularly known as "Hand of God 2.0".
- On 11 February 2020, in Group G of the 2020 AFC Cup, Joshua Grommen of Ceres-Negros F.C. scored the second goal of its game against Preah Khan Reach Svay Rieng FC by diverting the ball into the net with his hand. Despite vocal protests from the opposing side, the goal was given, as officials had failed to see the handball.

The hand of God's legacy extends beyond the realm of football. Paolo Sorrentino’s semi-autobiographical 2021 drama is named after the incident and references Maradona's influence on 1980s Naples. In the 2026 NBA Finals between the New York Knicks and San Antonio Spurs, the phrase was used to describe OG Anunoby's game-winning tip-in in game 4, capping off the Knicks' 29-point comeback.

== Maradona's shirt ==
After the game, Maradona swapped his shirt in the tunnel with Steve Hodge. After many years of requests to sell the shirt and a period of 20 years where it was on loan at the National Football Museum, in 2022 Hodge placed it up for auction with auctioneers Sotheby's. On 4 May 2022, the shirt sold at auction for £7.1m a world record for a piece of sports memorabilia.

== Match ball ==
The match ball Maradona used to score the goal was offered for auction in November 2020, at Graham Budd Auctions, but failed to sell, despite a bid of £2m. The ball was the property of Tunisian match referee Ali Ben Nasser.

It was offered for auction again, on 21 August 2026, with an opening bid of $2.5m (final $10m expected), at Heritage Auctions, with bidding continuing until 23 August 2026. The ball eventually sold for $3.3 million.

== See also ==
- Maradona, the Hand of God
