= Antonio Rattín =

Argentine footballer and politician (1937–2026)

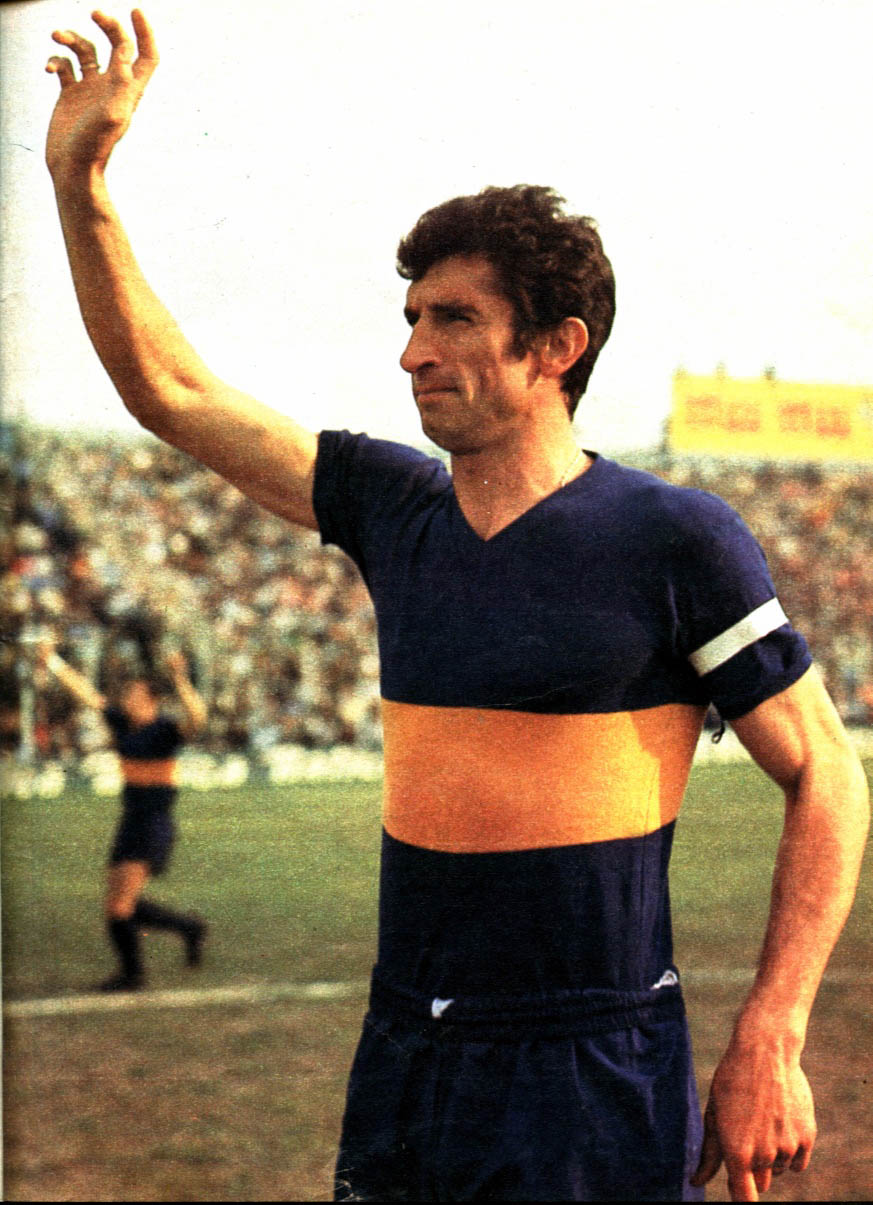
- Rattín with Boca Juniors in 1969

Personal information
- Date of birth: 16 May 1937
- Place of birth: Tigre, Buenos Aires, Argentina
- Date of death: 11 July 2026 (aged 89)
- Place of death: Buenos Aires, Argentina
- Height: 1.90 m (6 ft 3 in)
- Position: Midfielder

Youth career
- Boca Juniors

Senior career*
Years	Team	Apps	(Gls)
1956–1970	Boca Juniors	352	(26)

International career
1959–1969	Argentina	34	(1)

Managerial career
- 1977–1978: Gimnasia La Plata
- 1979: Gimnasia La Plata
- 1980: Boca Juniors
National Deputy
In office 10 December 2001 – 10 December 2005
Constituency	City of Buenos Aires
Personal details
Party	Federalist Unity
- * Club domestic league appearances and goals

Antonio Ubaldo Rattín (16 May 1937 – 11 July 2026) was an Argentine professional football player, manager and politician, best known as a midfielder for Boca Juniors, and for an incident during a match at the 1966 FIFA World Cup.

Rattín remains as one of the greatest idols of Boca Juniors, the only club where he played for 15 years, winning 5 titles. He also played for the Argentina national team, winning the Taça das Nações (Nations Cup) in 1964.

Following the end of his professional sports career, Rattín became involved in politics and, in the 2001 legislative election, was elected to the National Chamber of Deputies for the Federalist Unity Party list in Buenos Aires.

== Football career ==
A Boca Juniors supporter since childhood and joined the club's youth team. He made is professional debut on 9 September 1956, against River Plate, Boca's major rival, replacing the injured Eliseo Mouriño. Boca won the match 2–1. He subsequently established himself as the team's regular holding midfielder and gained a strong following among supporters.

In his fourteen-year professional career, Rattín played only for Boca Juniors, winning the Argentine championship in 1962, 1964 and 1965, and the Nacional in 1969. In the same year, he won the 1969 Copa Argentina

With the Argentina national team Rattín played 32 times, including the 1962 World Cup, and as the captain of his country in the 1966 World Cup that took place in England.

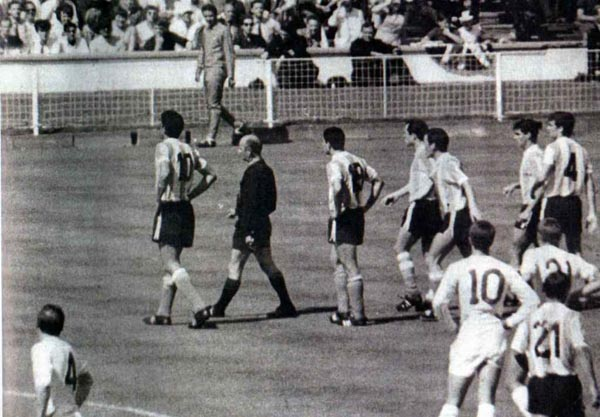
The infamous moment when Rattín (#10) is being sent-off during the Argentina-England match at 1966 FIFA World Cup

It was in the quarter-final match against the host team that Rattín was sent off by the German referee Rudolf Kreitlein for "violence of the tongue", despite the referee speaking no Spanish. Rattín was so incensed with the decision, believing the referee to be biased in favour of England, that he initially refused to leave. As a way to show his disgust, he sat on the red carpet which was exclusively for the Queen to walk on. He eventually had to be escorted from the field by two policemen and as a final sign of disgust he wrinkled a British pennant before he was escorted out. This incident, and others surrounding the same game, arguably started the long-lasting rivalry between both national teams - but, on the other hand, allowed for the institution of yellow and red cards into the football practice, a solution devised by FIFA after the spark that set off the incident.

After a total of 357 matches and 28 goals with Boca Juniors, Rattín retired from professional football in 1970. He worked as coach of the youth teams of Boca Juniors, and coached the first division teams of Gimnasia La Plata in 1977 and 1979, and Boca Juniors in 1980.

In 1978, Rattin was briefly employed by Sheffield United as a scout as part of the club's attempts to tap into the emerging South American market. He was partly responsible for bringing Alejandro Sabella to Bramall Lane but no other players followed and the partnership was quietly ended shortly afterwards.

== Political career ==
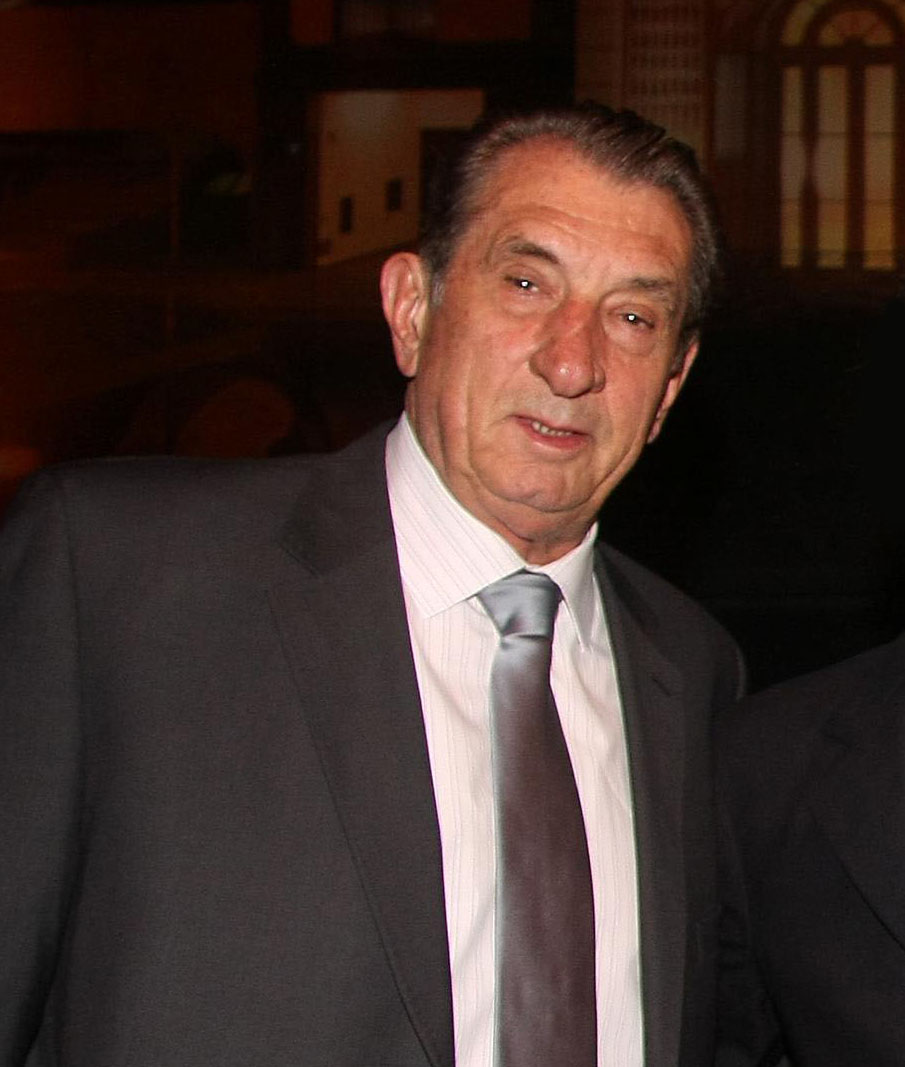
Rattín in 2010

In 2001, Rattín was elected to the Argentine Chamber of Deputies for the conservative Federalist Unity Party, led by the torturer Luis Patti. He was the first footballer to enter Congress and was chairman of the Sports Committee. He stepped down in 2005.

== Death ==
Rattin died on 11 July 2026, at the age of 89.

== Honours ==
=== Player ===
Boca Juniors

- Primera División: 1962, 1964, 1965, 1969 Nacional
- Copa Argentina: 1969
- Copa Libertadores runner-up: 1963

Argentina

- Taça das Nações: 1964
- Copa América runner-up: 1959, 1967

Individual

- IFFHS Argentina All Times Dream Team (Team B): 2021

== Bibliography ==
- Antonio Ubaldo Rattín - El Caudillo, by Alfredo Di Salvo - Autores Editores (publisher) - ISBN 987-43-1624-1
