= Argentina v England (1986 FIFA World Cup) =

Football match

1986 FIFA World Cup quarter-final
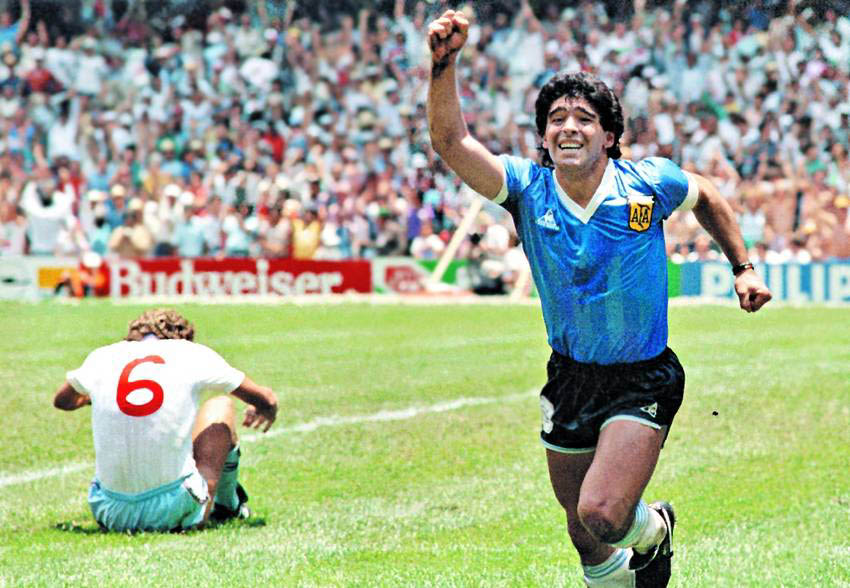
- Diego Maradona celebrating after scoring the "Goal of the Century"
- Event: 1986 FIFA World Cup
Argentina	England
(Argentina)	(England)
2	1
- Date: 22 June 1986
- Venue: Estadio Azteca, Mexico City
- Referee: Ali Bin Nasser (Tunisia)
- Attendance: 114,580
- Weather: Sunny

The Argentina 2–1 England quarter-final match of the 1986 FIFA World Cup was a football match played on 22 June 1986 between Argentina and England at Estadio Azteca in Mexico City. The match was held four years after the end of the Falklands War between Argentina and the United Kingdom, and was a key part of the already intense Argentina–England football rivalry. It was also a match which included two of the most well-known goals in football history, both scored by Argentina captain Diego Maradona.

The first goal, referred to as the "Hand of God" goal, was illegally scored by Maradona using his hand in the 51st minute. Four minutes later, Maradona dribbled past five England players to score what became known as the "Goal of the Century". Argentina won the match 2–1, and went on to win the tournament after defeating West Germany in the final. Maradona won the Golden Ball as the best player of the tournament. Gary Lineker, who scored England's goal against Argentina, won the Golden Boot for being the tournament's top scorer with six goals.

== Background ==
=== Argentina–England football rivalry ===
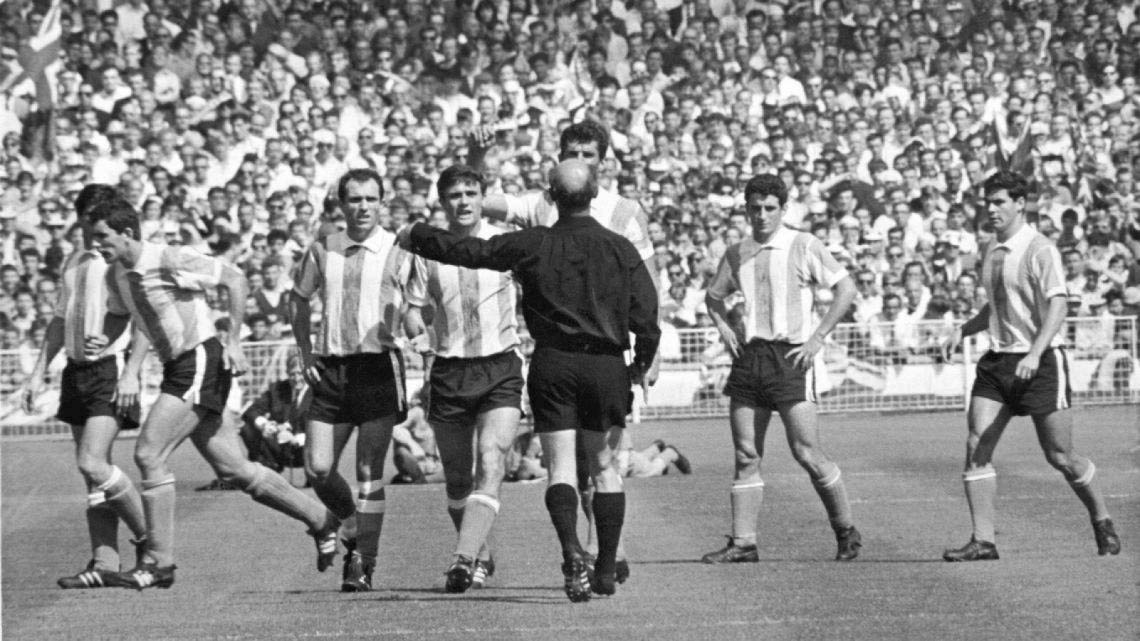
German Referee Rudolf Kreitlein sending off Argentina's Antonio Rattín at the 1966 World Cup

The rivalry between the national football teams of Argentinas and England is generally traced back to the 1966 FIFA World Cup, which was held in England. The quarter-final match at Wembley Stadium contained extensive foul play, and Argentina captain Antonio Rattín was sent off before Argentina lost the match 1–0.

Rattín was angered at his ejection, feeling that the German referee Rudolf Kreitlein, who did not speak Spanish, was biased towards England. Rattín proceeded to stomp on the royal carpet in the stadium, which led England manager Alf Ramsey to describe the Argentina players as "animals", a comment that caused outrage in Argentina.

=== The Falklands War ===
Outside football, the Falklands War of 1982 led to a rapid deterioration in Anglo-Argentine relations. Britain administers the Falkland Islands, a small archipelago in the South Atlantic, as a British overseas territory, however, Argentina also claims the islands. On 2 April 1982, the Argentine military launched an invasion of the islands, but Britain responded by sending a naval task force which recaptured the Falklands in two months. Though the two nations were never officially at war, the conflict resulted in 285 British and 659 Argentine casualties. As a result, the match taking place four years after the war was emotionally charged. Following the game, Maradona stated: "Although we had said before the game that football had nothing to do with the Malvinas war, we knew they had killed a lot of Argentine boys there, killed them like little birds. And this was revenge."

=== 1986 FIFA World Cup ===
The 1986 FIFA World Cup was held in Mexico after the original hosts, Colombia, were unable to host the tournament. England qualified for the finals undefeated, topping Group 3 in the UEFA zone; Argentina also topped their qualifying group in CONMEBOL. In the early stages of the tournament, Argentina had been comfortable, winning two and drawing one in the group stage. England had qualified more narrowly, with a 3–0 win over Poland in the final match putting them into the round of 16. Both teams won comfortably against South American opposition in that round, Argentina against Uruguay and England against Paraguay. Although neither team began the tournaments as favourites, England's form had been improving throughout the World Cup and Argentina were buoyed by the skill of Maradona.

=== Argentina kit change ===
Replica of the blue shirt worn by Argentina. The jerseys had been bought in Mexico City a few days before the match

Argentina beat Uruguay 1–0 in the round of 16 wearing blue cotton shirts that coach Carlos Bilardo believed would prove too uncomfortable in the searing Mexico City heat. Bilardo asked Argentina's kit manufacturer –Le Coq Sportif– to come up with lighter blue shirts for the quarter-final, an impossible request given the short deadline. With three days to go before the match, he sent out Ruben Moschella, a member of his coaching staff, to scour the shops of the Mexican capital for a suitable kit. He returned with two different blue shirts, which they subsequently weighed but were unable to choose between.

It was then that Diego Maradona appeared and said: "That’s a nice jersey. We'll beat England in that". Moschella returned to the shop and bought 38 of the shirts for the side to wear against England. A designer fashioned some makeshift Argentine Football Association (AFA) badges, which were then sewn on to each jersey opposite the logo of Le Coq Sportif, which provided the kits for Argentina at the time, with silver American football–style numbers hurriedly ironed on to the backs.

=== Previous incidents ===
Before the match, fans from both countries brawled in the Mexico City streets and into the stadium too. As a result, several English fans were hospitalised while some of their flags were stolen by Argentine barra bravas. Those flags would be then exhibited by Boca Juniors's supporters during some Argentine league matches.

== Match ==
=== First half ===
The game started with both teams exchanging chances. Argentina began to dominate, with England's goalkeeper Peter Shilton saving several good chances, many created by Maradona. Peter Beardsley had England's best chance after 13 minutes, following a slip from Nery Pumpido in Argentina's goal, but failed to take it. At half time, the score was 0–0, Argentina having had much more of the possession and territory – and done a great deal more of the running – but having failed to get through England's defence.

=== Second half ===
==== The "Hand of God" ====
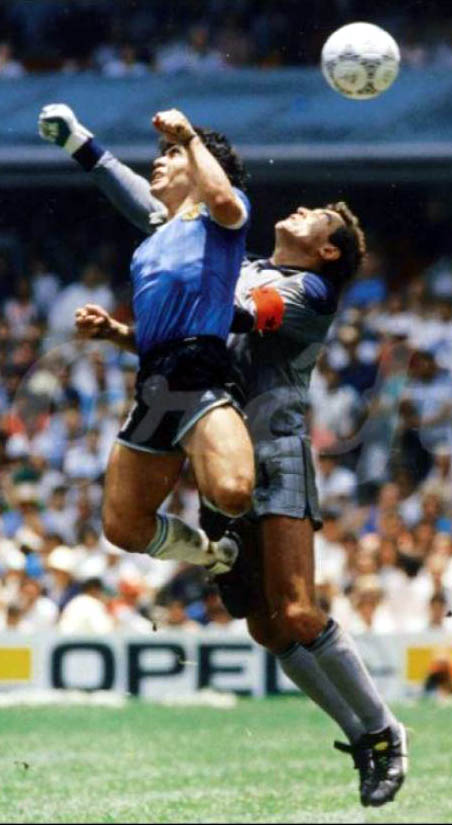
Diego Maradona scoring the first goal of the match with the "hand of God".

Six minutes into the second half, right wing-back Ricardo Giusti initiated a move by advancing toward the center of the pitch, laying the ball off to midfielder Jorge Burruchaga, who played it back to Sergio Batista. Batista switches play to left side of the pitch to find Héctor Enrique, who receives the ball and passes it to wing back Julio Olarticoechea. Crossing the half-way line, Olarticoechea delivers pass it to Maradona, near England's penalty box. Maradona decides to start an individual run toward the centre, as he dribbles past various English defenders before attempting to link up with Jorge Valdano on the right. Opposing midfielder Steve Hodge intercepts the ball before nerviously clearing it his own area. Seeing this, Shilton moves out to meet the ball but Maradona, 18 centimetres shorter, runs to England's box and contests and aerial duel, using his hand to punch the ball over Shilton's head, scoring the match's opening goal.

Like most players, none of the referees saw the illegal play, and Maradona started celebrating in disbelief. later said, "I was waiting for my teammates to embrace me, and no one came... I told them, 'Come hug me, or the referee isn't going to allow it.'"

At the post-game press conference, Maradona facetiously commented that the goal was scored "un poco con la cabeza de Maradona y otro poco con la mano de Dios" ("a little with the head of Maradona and a little with the hand of God"), after which it became known as the "Hand of God" goal. The goal helped intensify the footballing rivalry between the two nations. Cesar Luis Menotti, the former head coach of Argentina, said, "People said, 'Great! Better, much better, that the goal was so unjust, so cruel, because it hurt the English more.'" In the 2019 documentary film directed by Asif Kapadia, Maradona linked the event to the Falklands War: "I knew it was my hand. It wasn't my plan but the action happened so fast that the linesman didn't see me putting my hand in. The referee looked at me and he said: 'Goal'. It was a nice feeling like some sort of symbolic revenge against the English."

==== The Goal of the Century ====
Four minutes after his Hand of God goal, the ball was passed to Maradona inside his own half. Maradona then began his 60-yard, 10-second dash towards the English goal, passing four English outfield players: Peter Beardsley, Peter Reid, Terry Butcher (twice) and Terry Fenwick. Maradona finished the move with a feint that left goalkeeper Peter Shilton on his bottom, before slotting the ball into the empty net to make the score 2–0 to Argentina.

Video
- The "Hand of God" and the "Goal of the Century" on YouTube

About the goal, Maradona said to reporters, "I made the play to give it to Valdano, but when I got to the area they surrounded me and I had no space. Therefore, I had to continue the play and finish it myself." He later complimented the fair play of the English team, saying, "I don't think I could have done it against any other team because they all used to knock you down; they are probably the noblest in the world."

Diego Maradona scoring the Goal of the Century after getting past Terry Butcher and Peter Shilton

In 2002, the goal was voted 'Goal of the Century' as part of the buildup to the 2002 FIFA World Cup tournament on the FIFA website. It beat a goal scored by England's Michael Owen against Argentina in the 1998 FIFA World Cup, which came second, whilst another 1986 FIFA World Cup goal by Maradona, from the semi-final match against Belgium, came fourth. In Spanish-speaking countries, this goal is often associated with the passionate live commentary by Uruguayan journalist Víctor Hugo Morales.

==== Lineker's goal and Argentine victory ====
Argentina's 2–0 lead forced England into a double-attacking substitution, bringing on Barnes and Waddle, and it nearly paid off: as the Argentine team began to tire after their earlier efforts, England began to push further up the pitch, looking to get back into the game. Driven by Glenn Hoddle and John Barnes, they created chances, and Gary Lineker scored his sixth goal of the tournament in the 81st minute from a Barnes cross. Argentina had further chances as well, with Carlos Tapia hitting the inside of the post immediately after England's goal. England were unable to score an equaliser and Argentina won the match 2–1.

=== Details ===
22 June 1986
12:00 CST

Argentina	2–1	England
Maradona 51', 55'		Lineker 81'

Estadio Azteca, Mexico City
Attendance: 114,580
Referee: Ali Bin Nasser (Tunisia)

Argentina	England

GK	18	Nery Pumpido
SW	5	José Luis Brown
CB	9	José Luis Cuciuffo
CB	19	Oscar Ruggeri
RWB	14	Ricardo Giusti
LWB	16	Julio Olarticoechea
DM	2	Sergio Batista	(yellow card) 60'
CM	12	Héctor Enrique
CM	7	Jorge Burruchaga		(substituted off) 75'
SS	10	Diego Maradona (c)
CF	11	Jorge Valdano
Substitutes:
GK	15	Luis Islas
DF	8	Néstor Clausen
FW	17	Pedro Pasculli
MF	20	Carlos Daniel Tapia		(substituted on) 75'
MF	21	Marcelo Trobbiani
Manager:
Carlos Bilardo

GK	1	Peter Shilton (c)
RB	2	Gary M. Stevens
CB	14	Terry Fenwick	(yellow card) 9'
CB	6	Terry Butcher
LB	3	Kenny Sansom
RM	17	Trevor Steven		(substituted off) 74'
CM	4	Glenn Hoddle
CM	16	Peter Reid		(substituted off) 69'
LM	18	Steve Hodge
SS	20	Peter Beardsley
CF	10	Gary Lineker
Substitutes:
GK	13	Chris Woods
MF	8	Ray Wilkins
FW	11	Chris Waddle		(substituted on) 69'
DF	15	Gary A. Stevens
FW	19	John Barnes		(substituted on) 74'
Manager:
Bobby Robson

Match officials

- Assistant referees:
  - Berny Ulloa Morera (Costa Rica)
  - Bogdan Dotchev (Bulgaria)

== Aftermath and legacy ==
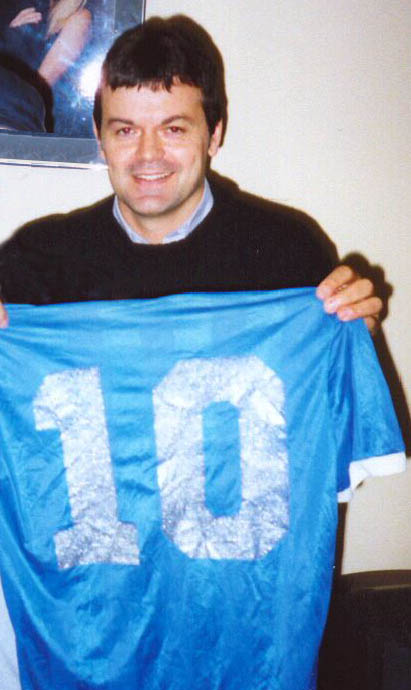
Steve Hodge posing with the jersey worn by Maradona in the match, which he swapped with him

Hodge swapped shirts with Maradona after the game; Hodge lent out the Argentine's jersey to the National Football Museum in the 2000s. The game added hugely to the rivalry between the two teams. In Argentina, the game was seen as revenge for the Falklands War and for what they still see as the unfair game in the 1966 World Cup. The former Argentine international Roberto Perfumo stated that "In 1986, winning that game against England was enough. Winning the World Cup was secondary for us. Beating England was our real aim."

The majesty of Maradona's second goal, the solo run from midfield, and the notoriety of his first, the "hand of God", saw the French newspaper L'Équipe describe him as "half-angel, half-devil". Although the first goal proved highly controversial in England, Maradona's second goal was nevertheless recognized all over the world for its brilliance. A notable example of the English appreciation of his genius occurred in a 2002 poll conducted by Channel 4, where the UK public voted Maradona's performance sixth in the list of the 100 Greatest Sporting Moments. Outside the Estadio Azteca a statue of Maradona scoring the goal was erected to commemorate the moment.

Argentina went on to win the 1986 FIFA World Cup by defeating West Germany in the final match, as well as finishing runners-up in the 1990 FIFA World Cup. England's Lineker won the Golden Boot for being top scorer in the 1986 FIFA World Cup. With a similar squad, England finished fourth in the 1990 FIFA World Cup, their highest finish since 1966.

The two teams have since met three times in World Cup matches. Argentina won a round-of-16 match in the shoot-out at the 1998 FIFA World Cup, after one penalty kick was awarded to each side, David Beckham was sent off, Sol Campbell had a goal disallowed and Michael Owen scored his famous goal. At the 2002 FIFA World Cup, the teams met in the group stage, and the match, which began at 12:30 PM UK time, was described as the "longest lunch break in history" as millions in England stopped their jobs and activities to watch the game on TV. England won 1–0 courtesy of a foul by Mauricio Pochettino on Michael Owen. Beckham's penalty kick won the match for England and Argentina later failed to advance to the knockout round. In 2026, the teams met in the semifinals. England got off to an early lead after a goal scored by Anthony Gordon before goals by Enzo Fernández and Lautaro Martínez gave Argentina a 2–1 win.

On 17 August 2015, Maradona visited Ali Bin Nasser, the referee of the 1986 World Cup quarter-final, at his home in Tunisia, and paid tribute to him by giving him an Argentine jersey bearing his signature, and referred to him as "my eternal friend".

In April 2022, it was announced that the shirt worn by Maradona in that match would be auctioned by multinational company Sotheby's. The shirt was property of England's Steve Hodge, who exchanged shirts with Maradona at the end of the match. Hodge had kept the piece for over 16 years until he lent it to the National Football Museum in Manchester to be exhibited there. The shirt was estimated to sell for more than £4 million (US$5.25 million).

I have been the proud owner of this item for over 35 years, since Diego and I swapped shirts in the tunnel after the famed match... It was an absolute privilege to have played against one of the greatest and most magnificent football players of all time.

— Steve Hodge about the 'Hand of God' shirt

On 4 May 2022, the shirt was sold for £7,142,500 (US$9.2 million), according to Sothebys' sources. The price fetched a new record for an item of football memorabilia.

In July 2026, the Argentina national rugby team played their 2026 Nations Championship match vs England wearing a kit that was an exact replica of the model worn in 1986, including details like the silver numbers on back. The kit –manufactured by Pumas kit supplier Le Coq Sportif, the same than Argentina in 1986– was a limited edition to commemorate the 40th. anniversary of the historic football match.

In 2026, Dallas-based Heritage Auctions auction house sold the match ball, which experts matched to photographs taken during the match, for US$3.35 million. Bin Nasser held onto the ball for 36 years before it was first auctioned in London in 2022 for 2 million pounds ($2.37 million). It was relisted for sale the following year, but the final bid of $2.04 million fell short of the predetermined reserve price, so no sale was completed.

== See also ==
- Argentina at the FIFA World Cup
- England at the FIFA World Cup
- The Match (2026 film)
