= Federalist Unity Party =

Political party in Argentina

The Federalist Union Party (Spanish: Partido Unidad Federalista, PAUFE), initially named Party of Buenos Aires Unity (Spanish: Partido de la Unidad Bonaerense, PUB), is a right-wing political party active in various provinces of Argentina. Its most visible leader is the former police chief, Luis Patti, former Mayor of Escobar, who is accused of torturing people during the last dictatorship.

The Party has attracted many Peronists and takes an authoritarian line on law and order. Patti himself is a former policeman.

Patti's Buenos Aires Province wing of PaUFe was the first and has traditionally been the most successful. At the legislative elections of 23 October 2005, Patti was candidate for National Deputy. He and one other PaUFe candidate were elected but he was prevented from taking his seat by a vote of deputies. The Party supported the Justicialist Party candidate for Senator, Chiche Duhalde. Other deputies for the party have included former Boca Juniors and Argentina footballer, Antonio Rattín, elected in 2001.

The 2007 elections exposed the internal differences in PaUFe. In Buenos Aires, the Party largely stood in opposition to the governing Front for Victory (FPV) but there were splits. Both PaUFe deputies in the provincial legislature left the party to unofficially support the FPV. Patti stood to be governor of the Province. In Tierra del Fuego Province, a PaUFe section under the leadership of Juan Flores claims to be entirely separate from Patti. In 2007 this party supported Cristina Fernández de Kirchner for President and saw the election of its candidate, Jorge Colazo (a former Radical governor), to the Argentine Senate. Patti threatened to take the Tierra del Fuego party to court to prevent them supporting the FPV. Despite the Tierra del Fuego party's claims of being entirely separate, their relationship with Patti, who was taken into custody in November 2007, continued to be questioned.

The PaUFe bloc in the Chamber of Deputies has one deputy, Adriana Tomaz, who follows the Buenos Aires line. Colazo joined the majority FPV bloc in the Senate, as did Mariel Calchaquí, Tierra del Fuego deputy, in the Lower House.
