= Luis Patti =

Argentine politician and former senior police officer

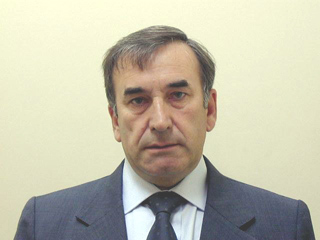
Patti in 2005

Luis Abelardo Patti (born 26 November 1952) is an Argentine convicted criminal, politician, and former senior police officer, sentenced to life imprisonment for his involvement in torture and murder during the 1970s. He is the leader of the conservative Federalist Union Party.

== Biography ==
=== Early life ===
Patti was born in rural Baigorrita, Buenos Aires Province, and as a child worked in a bakery. He entered the Buenos Aires Provincial Police Academy at 16 years old and was first stationed to the northern suburbs of Buenos Aires around Pilar and Belén de Escobar. Accusations against him date back to his early years in the force, a period of political instability and tough police action against guerillas, dissidents and other activities. He was accused in a local newspaper in 1973 of killing three youths wrongly believed to have committed a crime. Patti was tried for the torture of a prisoner in 1976, but the trial was suspended and not resumed before the time limit. In 1983 he faced two further trials, including for the kidnapping and murder of Osvaldo Cambiasso and Eduardo Pereyra Rossi. Again both trials were suspended. He rose through the ranks to become a police inspector and commisar and was decorated. In 1990 he faced accusations of torturing two alleged thieves with an electric prod.

In 1991 Patti was appointed by President Carlos Menem to lead the high-profile investigation into the murder of a young woman, María Soledad Morales, in Catamarca Province. He concluded it was a crime of passion, amid further allegations of the use of torture with suspects, but some years later the son of a politician with influential friends was convicted of the murder after a separate investigation.

=== Political career ===
In 1993, Patti left the police and joined the Justicialist Party. He wrote a column in the La Prensa newspaper and was appointed Intervenor of the Central Market by the government. Despite the accusations against him and graffiti around the area, Patti was elected Mayor of Escobar in 1995 with 73% of the vote. Patti launched a new party in 1999, Unidad Bonaerense, now called Partido Unidad Federalista (PA.U.FE). He was re-elected in Escobar that year and stood to be Governor of Buenos Aires Province. Patti obtained second place, but was defeated by Felipe Solá of the Justicialist Party by a 40% margin.

He ran for a seat in the Argentine Chamber of Deputies in 2005 on the same Federal Peronist ticket as Hilda González de Duhalde, candidate for the Senate, and was elected. However he was prevented from taking his seat because of the allegations against him, following a vote of the existing deputies. His replacement Dante Camaño, formerly a supporter of Duhalde's faction (opposed to president Kirchner), switched to the presidential faction of Peronism (the Front for Victory).

In 2008, while Patti's actions during the 1970s were still under formal investigation, the Supreme Court of Argentina ruled against the decision of the Chamber of Deputies, saying that he should be allowed to take his seat in Congress. This caused controversy with the Cabinet Chief Alberto Fernández saying that there was a "conflict of powers" between the legislative and the judicial branches of government.

Patti was ultimately convicted on 14 April 2010 for murder and sentenced to life imprisonment to be served in a regular prison facility; he admitted having a role in torture, albeit justifying his acts. Legislators from ARI, with government support, attempted to change Argentine law to prevent those accused of involvement from torture from taking public positions, a move which is highly accepted.

=== The Gerez incident ===
On the night of 27 December 2006, Luis Gerez, a Peronist workers' activist who had testified before Congress that Patti was in charge of torture sessions he endured in 1972, was supposedly kidnapped, and re-appeared two days later, immediately after a televised presidential speech on the subject, and purportedly bearing signs of forced restraint and torture (which were in no way evident during his press conference, nor later).

Public prosecutors were unable to find proof to support the hypothesis of a genuine abduction (telephone hearings implemented to track possible calls from the kidnappers indicated that Gerez himself, his concubine and political comrades may have been responsible), and consequently they have followed the theory of self-kidnapping. A medical examination of Gerez confirmed that he had been subjected to torture. Gerez, who was recently given an office in the Buenos Aires Province Legislature, has recognized that it's possible to cast doubt on his abduction. “Thirty years where necessary to acknowledge that there was genocide in Argentina. People will need time to understand my abduction”, he said.

Gerez had received threats since his testimony on 20 April. His disappearance was interpreted by the government as a message from groups who resent the re-opening of cases against Dirty War criminals, following the disappearance of Jorge Julio López, a witness of the Miguel Etchecolatz trial who is missing since September 2006. Two others who testified in Congress against Patti, Orlando Ubiedo and Hugo Esteban Jaime, had received threats during November and December 2006.

Patti himself denied any involvement in the threats and the kidnapping of Gerez, and claimed not to remember if Gerez had been arrested under his custody because "it was 30 years ago". He accused others of making political use of the disappearance.
