= Clemmie Moodie =

British journalist

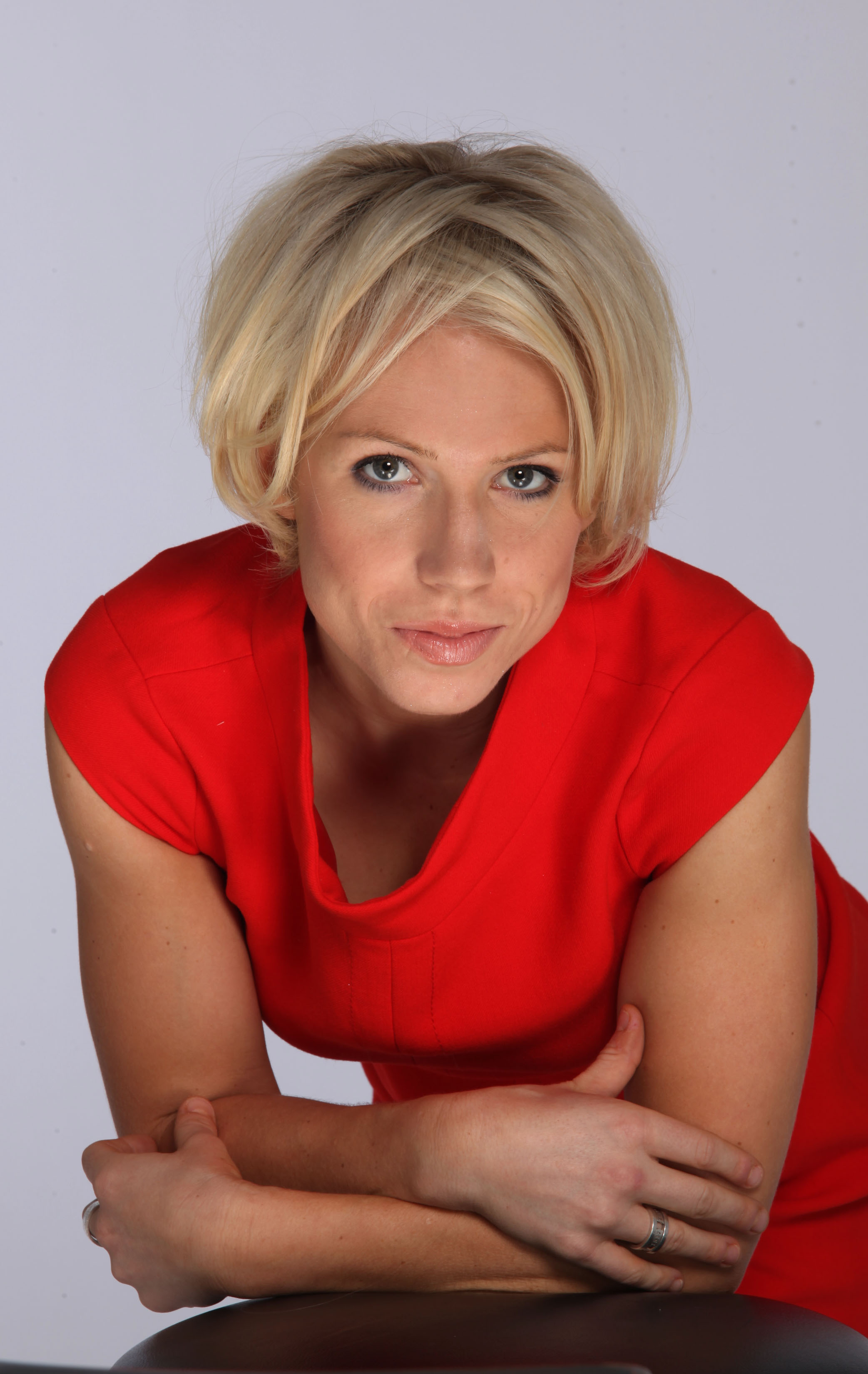
Clemmie Moodie, ex-3am editor

Clementine Moodie (born 8 December 1981) is an English journalist, columnist and assistant editor at The Sun [showbiz].

== Early life ==
While attending Guildford High School, she played lacrosse for England, South-East Region tennis and cricket for Surrey, and participated in the MCC women's first ever match. In August 1994, she competed in a national teenage tennis competition, losing to Helen Reesby, when living in Haslemere.

She read English literature at Exeter University and was voted the University Sports Personality of the Year in 2003. She graduated with a First Class Honours Degree.

== Journalism career ==
In 2004 she joined the Daily Mail as a showbusiness reporter where she worked until 2008 when she was recruited by the then editor of the Daily Mirror, Richard Wallace, to co-edit the 3 am girls column with former Sun reporter, Danielle Lawlor. In October 2010 she took over sole editorship of 3am. She has been nominated four times for the showbiz journalist of the year award.

In March 2013 she was voted Funniest Columnist of a national newspaper at the Loaded Lafta Awards.

In September 2014 she handed over the reins of the 3am column to her deputy, Ashleigh Rainbird, to become associate features editor at the Daily Mirror. In October 2016 she returned to the Daily Mail.

In April 2018 she joined the Sun on Sunday as Associate Showbusiness Editor.

In the 2019 annual press awards she was named Showbiz Reporter of the Year.

In September 2020 she became assistant editor at The Sun [showbiz]. She has a regular weekly column on Tuesdays.

== Other media work ==
She has discussed current showbiz topics on BBC Breakfast, Sky News, Good Morning Britain, The Xtra Factor on ITV2 and 5 News. She has been a guest on BBC Radio 1. She appeared on BBC Three's England's Worst Ever Football Team and England 2006: The Golden Generation on BBC iPlayer.

In October 2010 she walked the 63 km Inca Trail with Denise Van Outen, Fearne Cotton, Alexandra Burke, Amanda Byram and six women fighting breast cancer, to raise money for Breast Cancer Care Charity. In September 2012 she took part in the Virgin London Triathlon teaming up with David Hasselhoff and Alexandra Burke. She has competed in three London Marathons. She supports Tottenham Hotspur.
