= 1991 England Challenge Cup =

Tournament details
- Host country: England
- Dates: 21–25 May 1991
- Teams: 3 (from 2 confederations)
- Venue: 2

Final positions
- Champions: England
- Runners-up: Argentina
- Third place: Soviet Union

Tournament statistics
- Matches played: 3
- Goals scored: 10 (3.33 per match)
- Attendance: 92,029 (30,676 per match)
- Top scorer(s): (England) David Platt (3 goals)

The 1991 England Challenge Cup was a friendly association football tournament played over the course of a week in May 1991 in England. Wembley Stadium in London and Old Trafford in Manchester were the two venues used. The three way tournament contained the national teams of England, Argentina, and the Soviet Union. England were the tournament winners.

== Venues ==
Wembley Stadium

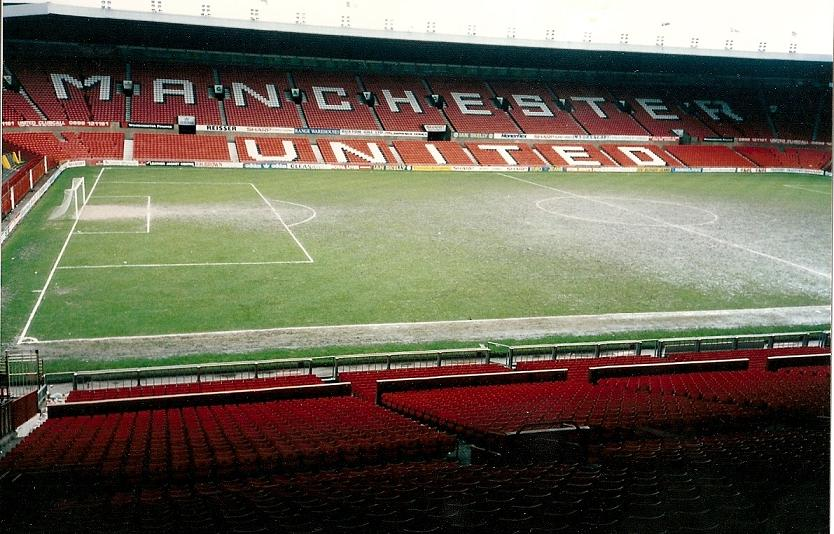
Old Trafford

== Results ==
All times listed are British Summer Time (UTC+1)

=== England vs Soviet Union ===
21 May 1991
20:00

England	3–1	Soviet Union
Smith 17'; Platt 44' (pen.), 88'		Tatarchuk 11'

Wembley Stadium, London
Attendance: 23,789
Referee: Emilio Soriano Aladrén (Spain)

England	Soviet Union

ENGLAND:
GK	1	Chris Woods (Rangers)
RB	3	Gary Stevens (Rangers)
CB	2	Paul Parker (Queen's Park Rangers)
CB	6	Mark Wright (Derby County) (c)
LB	5	Tony Dorigo (Chelsea)
RW	11	Dennis Wise (Chelsea)	(substituted off) 70'
MF	4	David Platt (Aston Villa)
MF	7	Geoff Thomas (Crystal Palace)
LW	10	John Barnes (Liverpool)
FW	9	Alan Smith (Arsenal)
FW	8	Ian Wright (Crystal Palace)	(substituted off) 70'
Substitutes:
DF	13	Lee Dixon (Arsenal)
GK	12	David Seaman (Arsenal)
MF	14	Neil Webb (Manchester United)
MF	15	David Batty (Leeds United)	(substituted on) 70'
FW	16	Peter Beardsley (Liverpool)	(substituted on) 70'
Manager:
Graham Taylor

SOVIET UNION:
GK	1	Aleksandr Uvarov (Dynamo Moscow)
DF	2	Andrey Chernyshov (Dynamo Moscow)
DF	3	Akhrik Tsveiba (Dynamo Kiev)
DF	6	Dmitri Galiamin (CSKA Moscow)	(yellow card) 65'
MF	8	Andrei Kanchelskis (Manchester United)
MF	7	Igor Shalimov (Spartak Moscow)		(substituted off) 67'
MF	4	Vasili Kulkov (Spartak Moscow)
MF	11	Aleksei Mikhailichenko (Sampdoria) (c)
MF	5	Dmitri Kuznetsov (CSKA Moscow)
FW	9	Igor Kolyvanov (Dynamo Moscow)
FW	10	Vladimir Tatarchuk (CSKA Moscow)		(substituted off) 52'
Substitutes:
GK	12	Stanislav Cherchesov (Spartak Moscow)
MF	13	Aleksandr Mostovoi (Spartak Moscow)		(substituted on) 52'
FW	14	Igor Korneev (CSKA Moscow)		(substituted on) 67'
MF	15	Igor Dobrovolski (Castellón)
MF	16	Ilya Tsymbalar (Chornomorets Odessa)
Manager:
Anatoly Byshovets

Assistant referees:
Peter Mikkelsen (Denmark)
Zoran Petrović (Yugoslavia)

=== Argentina vs Soviet Union ===
23 May 1991
20:00

Argentina	1–1	Soviet Union
Ruggeri 44'		Kolyvanov 49'

Old Trafford, Manchester
Attendance: 23,743
Referee: Peter Mikkelsen (Denmark)

Argentina	Soviet Union

ARGENTINA:
GK	1	Sergio Goycochea (Racing Club)
RB	2	Sergio Vázquez (Ferro Carril Oeste)	Booked
CB	4	Fabián Basualdo (River Plate)
CB	6	Oscar Ruggeri (Vélez Sársfield) (c)
LB	3	Carlos Enrique (River Plate)
MF	10	David Bisconti (Rosario Central)		(substituted off) 70'
MF	8	Diego Simeone (Pisa)
MF	5	Darío Franco (Newell's Old Boys)	Booked
MF	7	Leonardo Astrada (River Plate)
FW	9	Carlos Alfaro Moreno (Independiente)
FW	11	Claudio García (Racing Club)	Booked
Substitutes:
GK	12	Alejandro Lanari (Rosario Central)
DF	15	Ricardo Altamirano (Independiente)
DF	13	Fernando Gamboa (Newell's Old Boys)
MF	14	Sergio Berti (River Plate)		(substituted on) 70'
FW	16	Ariel Boldrini (Newell's Old Boys)
Manager:
Alfio Basile

SOVIET UNION:
GK	1	Stanislav Cherchesov (Spartak Moscow)
DF	2	Andrey Chernyshov (Dynamo Moscow)	(red card) 72'
DF	3	Akhrik Tsveiba (Dynamo Kiev)		(substituted off) 28'
DF	6	Dmitri Galiamin (CSKA Moscow)
MF	7	Igor Shalimov (Spartak Moscow)
MF	8	Andrei Kanchelskis (Manchester United)
MF	4	Vasili Kulkov (Spartak Moscow)
MF	11	Alexei Mikhailichenko (Sampdoria) (c)
MF	5	Aleksandr Mostovoi (Spartak Moscow)		(substituted off) 60'
FW	9	Igor Kolyvanov (Dynamo Moscow)
FW	10	Igor Dobrovolski (Castellón)
Substitutes:
GK	12	Aleksandr Uvarov (Dynamo Moscow)
MF	16	Dmitri Kuznetsov (CSKA Moscow)		(substituted on) 28'
FW	15	Oleg Sergeyev (CSKA Moscow)		(substituted on) 60'
MF	13	Vladimir Tatarchuk (CSKA Moscow)
MF	14	Igor Korneev (CSKA Moscow)
Manager:
Anatoly Byshovets

Assistant referees:
Emilio Soriano Aladrén (Spain)
Zoran Petrović (Yugoslavia)

Sergio Goycochea saved a penalty from Igor Dobrovolski during the first half when the score was 0–0.

=== England vs Argentina ===
25 May 1991
15:00

England	2–2	Argentina
Lineker 15'; Platt 51'		García 66'; Franco 72'

Wembley Stadium, London
Attendance: 44,497
Referee: Zoran Petrović (Yugoslavia)

England	Argentina

ENGLAND:
GK	1	David Seaman (Arsenal)
RB	2	Lee Dixon (Arsenal)
CB	6	Mark Wright (Derby County)
CB	4	Des Walker (Nottingham Forest)
LB	3	Stuart Pearce (Nottingham Forest)
MF	8	David Batty (Leeds United)
MF	11	John Barnes (Liverpool)	(substituted off) 63'
MF	7	David Platt (Aston Villa)
MF	5	Geoff Thomas (Crystal Palace)
FW	9	Alan Smith (Arsenal)
FW	10	Gary Lineker (Tottenham Hotspur) (c)
Substitutes:
DF	13	Paul Parker (Queen's Park Rangers)
GK	12	Chris Woods (Rangers)
MF	14	Lee Sharpe (Manchester United)
FW	15	Peter Beardsley (Liverpool)
MF	16	Nigel Clough (Nottingham Forest)	(substituted on) 63'
Manager:
Graham Taylor

ARGENTINA:
GK	1	Sergio Goycochea (Racing Club)
RB	4	Fabián Basualdo (River Plate)
CB	2	Sergio Vázquez (Ferro Carril Oeste)
CB	6	Oscar Ruggeri (Vélez Sársfield) (c)
LB	7	Carlos Enrique (River Plate)
MF	8	Diego Simeone (Pisa)
MF	5	Darío Franco (Newell's Old Boys)
MF	3	Fernando Gamboa (Newell's Old Boys)
MF	10	Germán Martellotto (Monterrey)		(substituted off) 60'
FW	7	Claudio García (Racing Club)	(yellow card) 90'
FW	9	Ariel Boldrini (Newell's Old Boys)
Substitutes:
GK	12	Alejandro Lanari (Rosario Central)
DF	14	Ricardo Altamirano (Independiente)
DF	15	Néstor Fabbri (Racing Club)
MF	16	Gustavo Zapata (River Plate)
FW	17	Antonio Mohamed (Huracán)		(substituted on) 60'
Manager:
Alfio Basile

Assistant referees:
Peter Mikkelsen (Denmark)
Emilio Soriano Aladrén (Spain)

== Standings ==
Team	Pld	W	D	L	GF	GA	GD	Pts
England	2	1	1	0	5	3	+2	3
Argentina	2	0	2	0	3	3	0	2
Soviet Union	2	0	1	1	2	4	–2	1

1991 Challenge Cup

England
first title

== Goalscorers ==
3 goals

- (England) David Platt

1 goal

- (Argentina) Darío Franco
- (Argentina) Claudio García
- (Soviet Union) Igor Kolivanov
- (England) Gary Lineker
- (Argentina) Oscar Ruggeri
- (England) Alan Smith
- (Soviet Union) Vladimir Tatarchuk
