= England national football team =

Men's association football team

England
- Nickname: The Three Lions
- Association: The Football Association (The FA)
- Confederation: UEFA (Europe)
- Head coach: Thomas Tuchel
- Captain: Harry Kane
- Most caps: Harry Kane (127)
- Top scorer: Harry Kane (93)
- Home stadium: Wembley Stadium
- FIFA code: ENG
First colours	Second colours

FIFA ranking
- Current: 4 (18 November 2026)
- Highest: 3 (August–September 2012, September–October 2021, November 2023)
- Lowest: 27 (February 1996)

First international
- England 0–0 Scotland (Partick, Scotland; 30 November 1872) (The first ever international football match)

Biggest win
- England 13–0 Ireland (Belfast, Ireland; 18 February 1882)

Biggest defeat
- Hungary 7–1 England (Budapest, Hungary; 23 May 1954)

World Cup
- Appearances: 17 (first in 1950)
- Best result: Champions (1966)

European Championship
- Appearances: 11 (first in 1968)
- Best result: Runners-up (2020, 2024)

Nations League Finals
- Appearances: 1 (first in 2019)
- Best result: Third place (2019)
Medal record
Men's football
FIFA World Cup
Gold medal – first place	1966 England	Team
Bronze medal – third place	2026 Canada–Mexico–US	Team
UEFA European Championship
Silver medal – second place	2020 Europe	Team
Silver medal – second place	2024 Germany	Team
Bronze medal – third place	1968 Italy	Team
UEFA Nations League
Bronze medal – third place	2019 Portugal	Team
- Website: englandfootball.com

The England national football team, nicknamed the Three Lions, have represented England in men's international football since the first international match in 1872. They are governed by The Football Association (FA), the governing body for football in England, which is affiliated with UEFA and FIFA. England competes in three major international tournaments: the FIFA World Cup, UEFA European Championship, and UEFA Nations League.

England and Scotland are together the oldest national football teams in the world, having played in the world's first international football match in 1872. England plays home matches at Wembley Stadium in London, and their training headquarters is St George's Park in Burton upon Trent. Thomas Tuchel is the current head coach.

England won their lone FIFA World Cup title on home soil in 1966, making them one of eight nations to have won the World Cup. They have qualified for the World Cup seventeen times, finishing in third place in 2026, and fourth place in 1990 and 2018. England have never won the European Championship, with their best performances to date being runners-up finishes in 2020 and 2024. As a constituent country of the United Kingdom, England are not a member of the International Olympic Committee (as English athletes compete for Great Britain), and so do not compete at the Olympic Games. England are the only team to have won the World Cup at senior level but not their own major continental title, and the only team representing a non–sovereign state to have won the World Cup. England shares football rivalries with Scotland, Germany, and Argentina.

== History ==
=== Early years ===
The England men's national football team is the joint-oldest in the world; it was formed at the same time as Scotland. A representative match between England and Scotland was played on 5 March 1870, having been organised by the Football Association. A return fixture was organised by representatives of Scottish football teams on 30 November 1872. This match, played at Hamilton Crescent in Scotland, is viewed as the first official international football match, because the two teams were independently selected and operated, rather than being the work of a single football association. Over the next 40 years, England played exclusively with the other three Home Nations—Scotland, Wales and Ireland—in the British Home Championship.

At first, England had no permanent home stadium. They joined FIFA in 1906 and played their first games against countries other than the Home Nations on a tour of Central Europe in 1908. Wembley Stadium was opened in 1923 and became their home ground. The relationship between England and FIFA became strained, and this resulted in their departure from FIFA in 1928, before they rejoined in 1946. As a result, they did not compete in a World Cup until 1950, in which they were beaten 1–0 by the United States, failing to get past the first round in one of the most embarrassing defeats in the team's history.

Their first defeat on home soil to a foreign team was a 2–0 loss to Ireland, on 21 September 1949 at Goodison Park. A 6–3 loss in 1953 to Hungary was their second defeat by a foreign team at Wembley. In the return match in Budapest, Hungary won 7–1. This stands as England's largest ever defeat. After the game, a bewildered Syd Owen said, "it was like playing men from outer space". In the 1954 FIFA World Cup, England reached the quarter-finals for the first time, and lost 4–2 to reigning champions Uruguay.

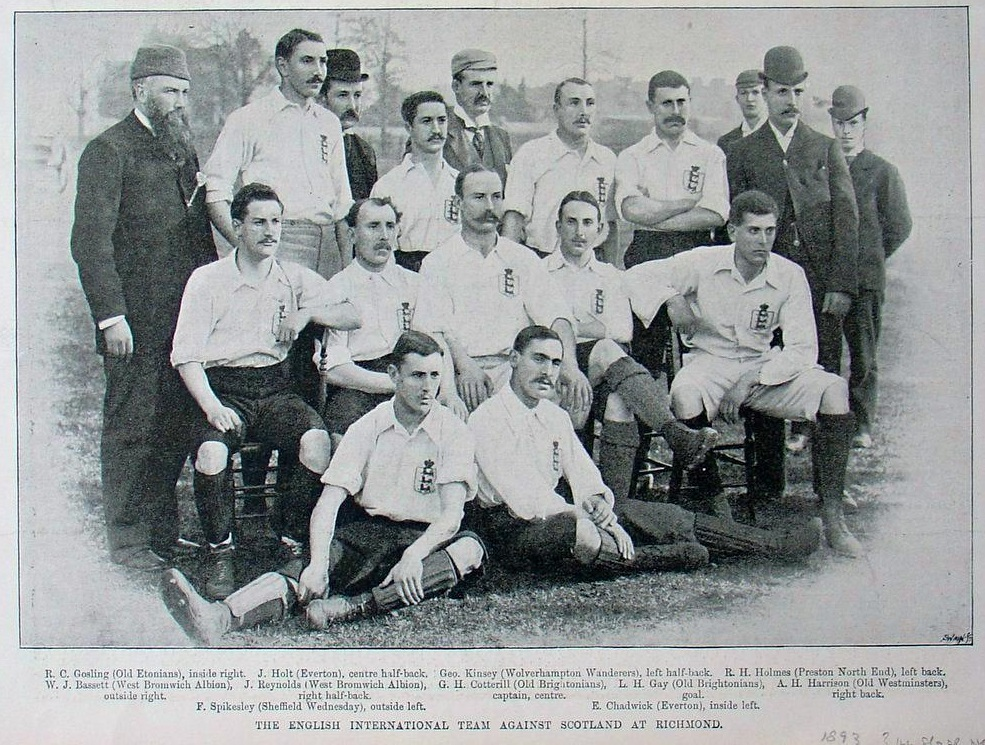
The England team before a match against Scotland at Richmond in 1893

=== Walter Winterbottom and Alf Ramsey ===
Although Walter Winterbottom was appointed as England's first full-time manager in 1946, the team was still picked by a committee until Alf Ramsey took over in 1963. The 1966 World Cup was hosted in England and Ramsey guided England to victory with a 4–2 win against West Germany after extra time in the final, during which Geoff Hurst scored a hat-trick. At UEFA Euro 1968 in Italy, the team reached the semi-finals for the first time, being eliminated by Yugoslavia.

England qualified automatically for the 1970 World Cup in Mexico as reigning champions, and reached the quarter-finals, where they were knocked out by West Germany. England had been 2–0 up, but were eventually beaten 3–2 after extra time. They then failed to qualify for Euro 1972 and the 1974 World Cup, leading to Ramsey's dismissal by the FA.

=== Don Revie, Ron Greenwood and Bobby Robson ===
Following Ramsey's dismissal, Joe Mercer took immediate temporary charge of England for a seven-match spell until Don Revie was appointed as new permanent manager in 1974. Under Revie, the team underperformed and failed to qualify for either Euro 1976 or the 1978 World Cup. Revie resigned in 1977 and was replaced by Ron Greenwood, under whom performances improved. The team qualified for Euro 1980 without losing any of their games, but exited in the group stage of the final tournament in Italy. They also qualified for the 1982 World Cup in Spain; despite not losing a game, they were eliminated at the second group stage.

Bobby Robson managed England from 1982 to 1990. Although the team failed to qualify for Euro 1984, they reached the quarter-finals of the 1986 World Cup, losing 2–1 to Argentina in a game made famous by two highly contrasting goals scored by Diego Maradona – the first being blatantly knocked in by his hand, prompting his "Hand of God" remark, the second being an outstandingly skilful individual goal, involving high speed dribbling past several opponents. England striker Gary Lineker finished as the tournament's top scorer with six goals.

England went on to lose every match at Euro 1988. They next achieved their second best result in the 1990 World Cup by finishing fourth – losing again to West Germany after a closely contested semi-final finishing 1–1 after extra time, then 3–4 in England's first penalty shoot-out. Despite losing to Italy in the match for third place, the members of the England team were given bronze medals identical to the Italians'. Due to the team's good performance at the tournament against general expectations, and the emotional nature of the narrow defeat to West Germany, the team were welcomed home as heroes and thousands of people lined the streets for an open-top bus parade.

=== Graham Taylor, Terry Venables, Glenn Hoddle and Kevin Keegan ===
The 1990s saw four England managers follow Robson, each in the role for a relatively brief period. Graham Taylor was Robson's immediate successor. England failed to win any matches at Euro 1992, drawing with tournament winners Denmark and later with France, before being eliminated by host nation Sweden. The team then failed to qualify for the 1994 World Cup after losing a controversial game against the Netherlands in Rotterdam, which resulted in Taylor's resignation. Taylor faced much newspaper criticism during his tenure for his tactics and team selections.

Between 1994 and 1996, Terry Venables took charge of the team. Hosting Euro 1996, they equalled their best performance at a European Championship, reaching the semi-finals as they did in 1968, before exiting via another penalty shoot-out loss to Germany. England striker Alan Shearer was the tournament's top scorer with five goals. At Euro 96, the song "Three Lions" by Baddiel, Skinner and the Lightning Seeds became the definitive anthem for fans on the terraces, and popularised the chant "it's coming home". Venables announced before the tournament that he would resign at the end of it, following investigations into his personal financial activities and ahead of upcoming court cases. Due to the controversy around him, the FA stressed that he was the coach, not the manager, of the team.

Under Venables's successor, Glenn Hoddle, England won the 1997 Tournoi de France, which remains their only tournament win since the 1966 World Cup. He then took the team to the 1998 World Cup — in which England were eliminated in the second round, again by Argentina and again on penalties (after a 2–2 draw). In February 1999, Hoddle was sacked by the FA due to controversial comments he had made about disabled people to a newspaper. Howard Wilkinson took over as caretaker manager for two matches. Kevin Keegan was then appointed as the new permanent manager and took England to Euro 2000, but the team exited in the group stage and he unexpectedly resigned shortly afterwards.

=== Sven-Göran Eriksson and Steve McClaren ===
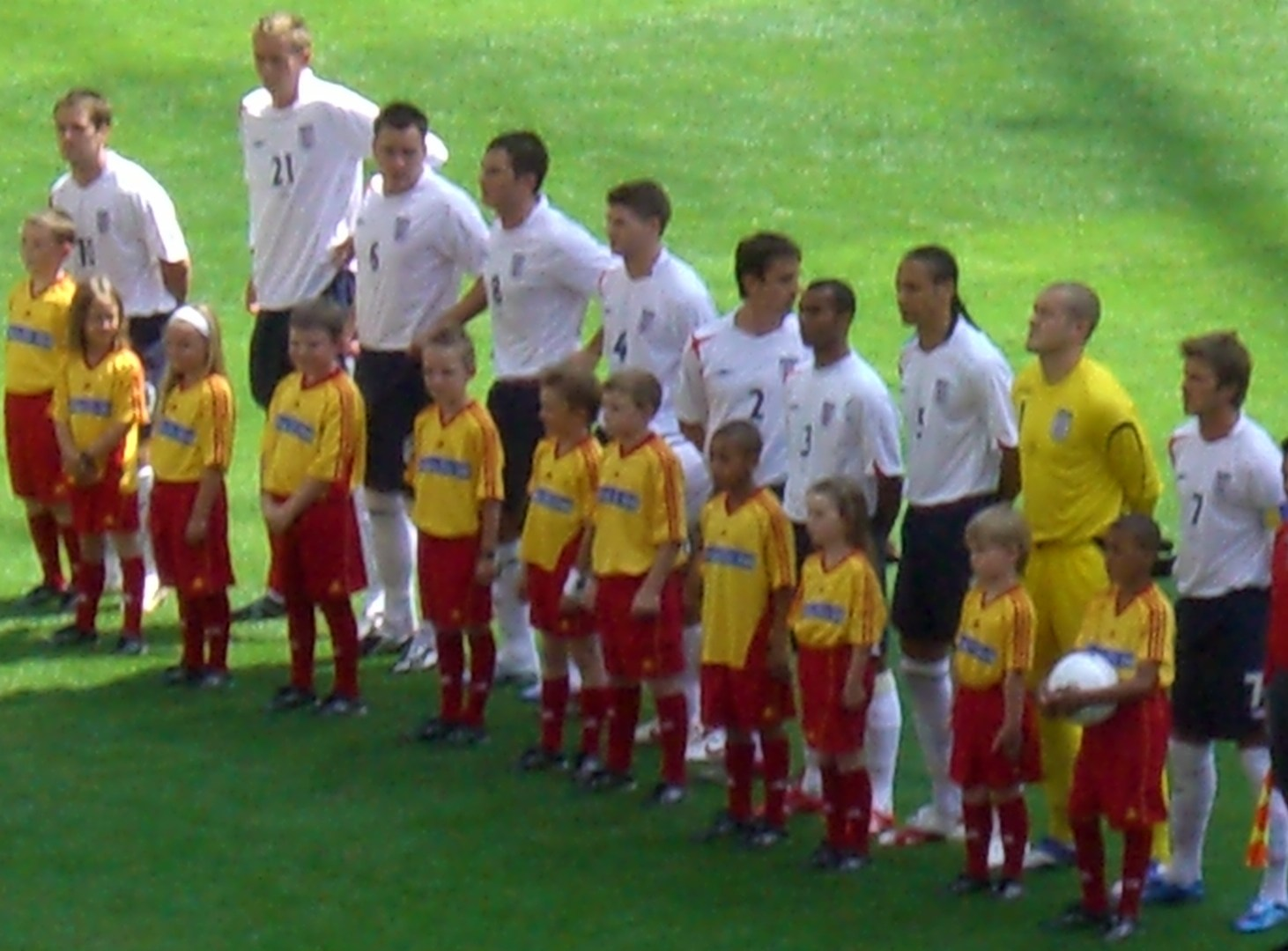
The England team at the 2006 FIFA World Cup

Peter Taylor was appointed as caretaker manager for one match, before Sven-Göran Eriksson took charge between 2001 and 2006, and was the team's first non-English manager. Although England's players in this era were dubbed a "golden generation" and only lost five competitive matches during Eriksson's tenure, they exited at the quarter-finals of the 2002 World Cup, Euro 2004 and the 2006 World Cup. In January 2006 it was announced that Eriksson would leave the role following that year's World Cup. Steve McClaren was selected to succeed Eriksson, but was sacked on 22 November 2007 after just 18 matches in charge as England failed to qualify for Euro 2008. McClaren was criticised for his team selection in his final game – a decisive qualifier against Croatia which England lost 3–2 – particularly the decision to select inexperienced goalkeeper Scott Carson, whose mistake lead to Croatia's first goal.

=== Fabio Capello, Roy Hodgson and Sam Allardyce ===
On 14 December 2007, Italian manager Fabio Capello was appointed as McClaren's successor, becoming only the second foreign coach to take the job. At the 2010 World Cup, England were considered favourites to top their group but drew their opening two games against the United States and Algeria; this led to questions about the team's spirit, tactics and ability to handle pressure. Despite this, England progressed to the round of 16, where they were beaten 4–1 by Germany, their heaviest defeat in a World Cup finals tournament match. This match became infamous for a ghost goal when Frank Lampard hit a shot from outside the penalty area that bounced down off the crossbar and over the goal line before being cleared by German goalkeeper Manuel Neuer, with neither the referee nor the assistant opting to award a goal. Had it been given, the goal would have tied the game 2–2 with England coming from two goals down. This incident – along with similar mistakes at the tournament – led to an apology from FIFA president Sepp Blatter and was a factor in the subsequent decision to introduce goal-line technology into football. Capello continued as England manager, leading the team's successful qualifying campaign for Euro 2012, before resigning from the role in February 2012 following a disagreement with the FA over their request to remove John Terry from the team captaincy following accusations of racial abuse against the player.

Following Capello's departure, Stuart Pearce was appointed as caretaker manager for one match, after which in May 2012, Roy Hodgson was announced as the new manager, just six weeks before Euro 2012. England managed to finish top of their group, but exited the European Championship in the quarter-finals via a penalty shoot-out against Italy. In the 2014 World Cup, England were eliminated at the group stage for the first time since 1958. At Euro 2016, England were eliminated in the round of 16, losing 2–1 to Iceland in a result that has been described as among their worst ever defeats. Hodgson tendered his resignation shortly after the full-time whistle, with Sam Allardyce announced as his successor in July 2016. After one match and only 67 days in charge, Allardyce resigned from his managerial post by mutual agreement following an alleged breach of FA rules. This makes Allardyce the shortest serving permanent England manager.

=== Gareth Southgate and Thomas Tuchel ===
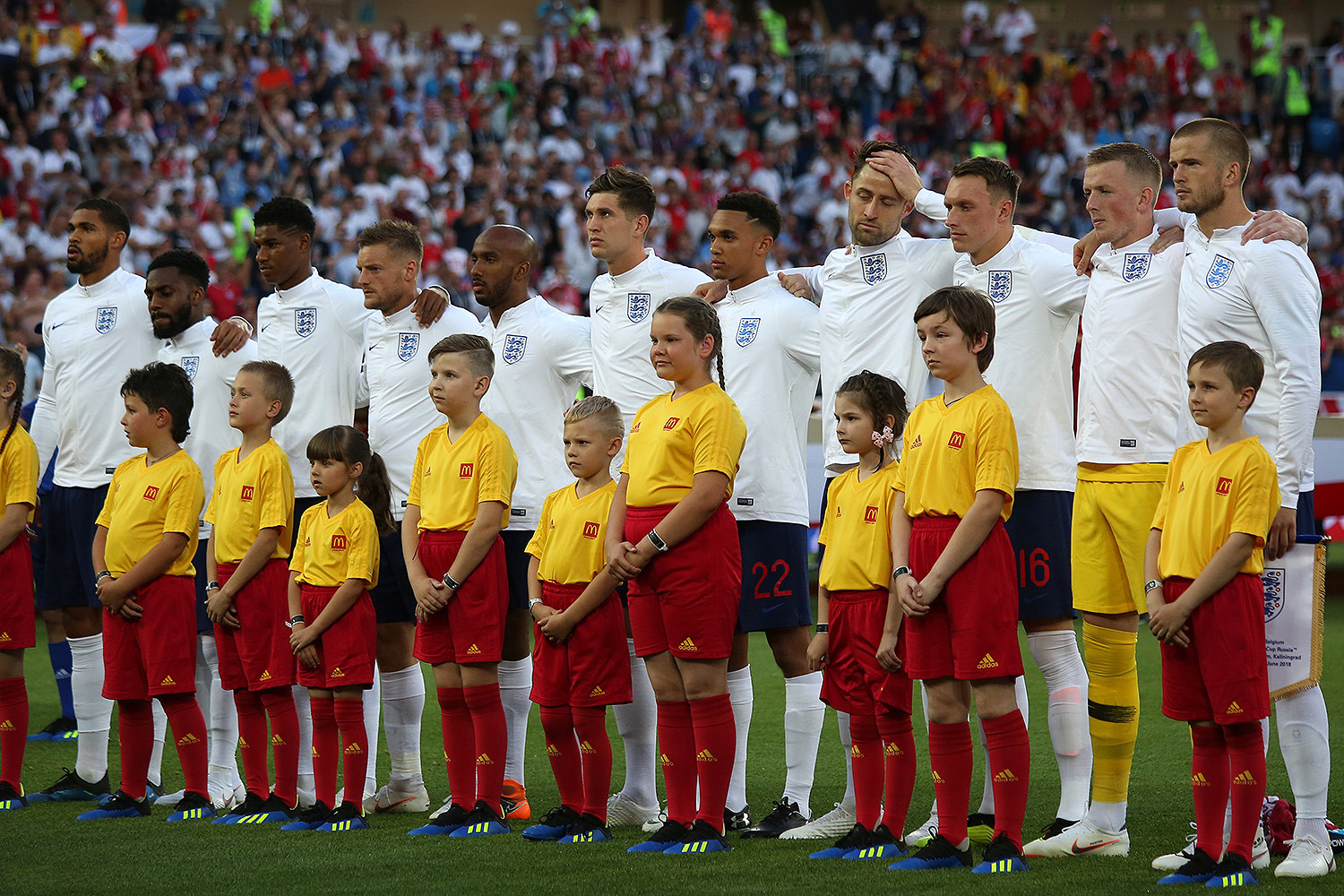
The England line-up before the last match of group G against Belgium, 28 June 2018

After Allardyce's resignation, Gareth Southgate, then the coach of the England under-21 team, was put in temporary charge of the national team until November 2016, before being given the position on a permanent basis at the end of that period. At the 2018 World Cup, England reached the semi-finals for the third time. After finishing second in their group, England faced Colombia in the round of 16 where they won on penalties for the first time at a World Cup, before beating Sweden in the quarter-finals. In the semi-final, they were beaten 2–1 in extra time by Croatia and finished fourth after losing the match for third place against Belgium. England striker Harry Kane finished the tournament as top scorer with six goals and was awarded the golden boot.

On 14 November 2019, England played their 1000th international match, defeating Montenegro 7–0 at Wembley in a Euro 2020 qualifying match.

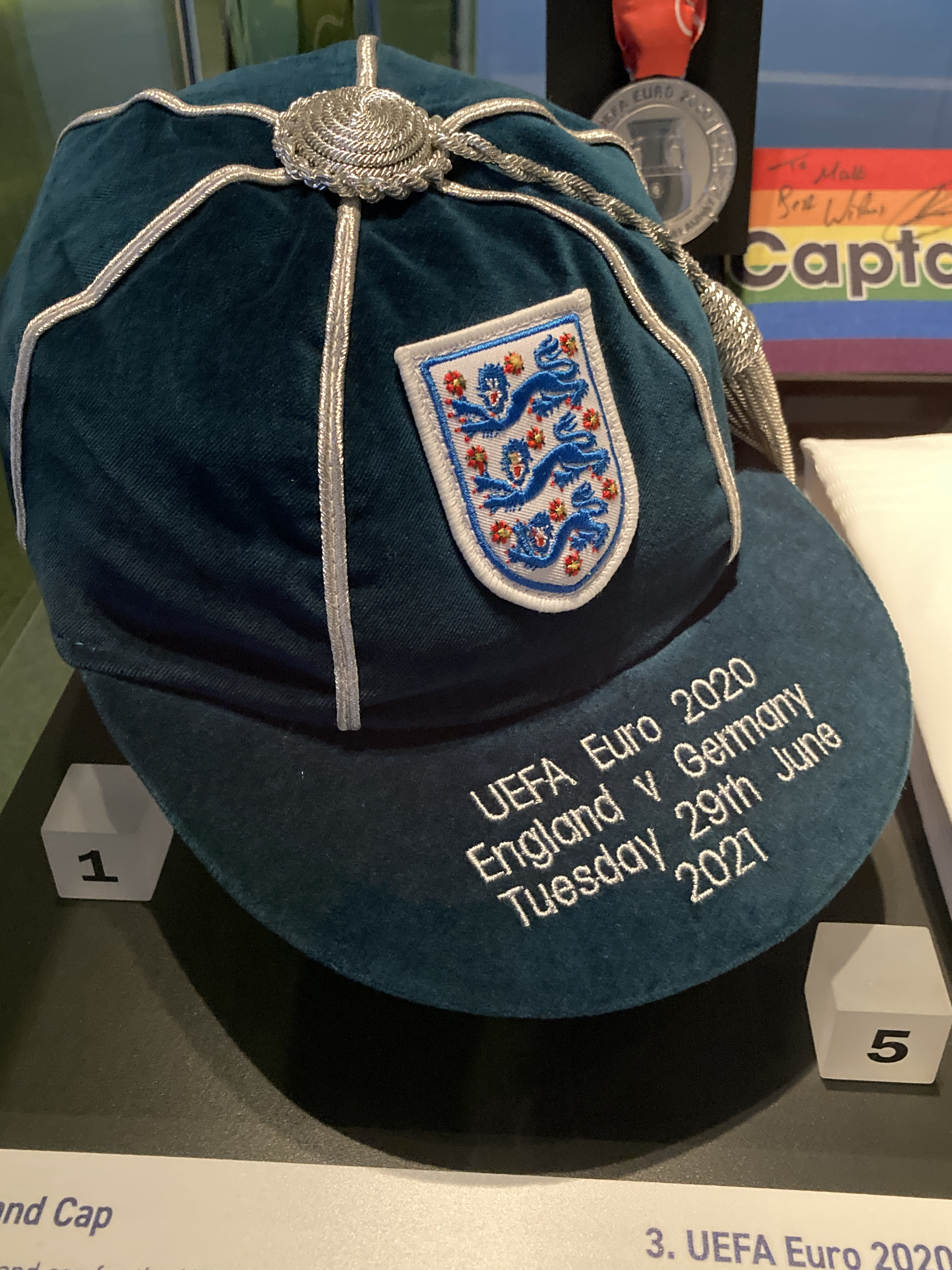
England cap awarded to Harry Kane for his appearance against Germany at Euro 2020, his 58th overall

At the delayed Euro 2020, England reached their first European Championship final, and their first final at a major tournament since 1966. After finishing top of their group above Croatia, Czechia, and Scotland, the Three Lions beat Germany, Ukraine and Denmark in the knockout rounds to advance to the final. In the final held at Wembley, England were defeated by Italy on penalties after a 1–1 draw.

At the 2022 World Cup, England defeated Iran and Wales in the group stage to qualify for the round of 16. In the round of 16, the Three Lions defeated Senegal 3–0, but were then eliminated by reigning world champions France in the quarter-finals, 2–1. In that match, Harry Kane scored his 53rd goal for England, equalling the all-time record at the time.

At Euro 2024, England finished top of their group above Denmark, Slovenia, and Serbia. In the round of 16, England defeated Slovakia 2–1 after extra time, with Jude Bellingham scoring with a bicycle kick in second-half stoppage time to equalise the match. In the quarter-final, England beat Switzerland on penalties after the game finished 1–1. The Three Lions reached their second consecutive European Championship final after defeating the Netherlands 2–1 in the semi-final. In the final, England were defeated 2–1 by Spain, becoming the first team to lose consecutive European Championship finals. With three goals, Harry Kane was the joint top scorer at the tournament and shared the golden boot with five other players.

Whilst the FA were willing to extend his contract further, Southgate announced his resignation as England manager on 16 July 2024, saying that it was "time for change, and for a new chapter". On 16 October 2024, the FA announced that German manager Thomas Tuchel would take over as manager from 1 January 2025, becoming the third foreign coach to take up the position.

Under Tuchel, England became the first European nation to secure qualification for the 2026 FIFA World Cup after winning all six of their qualification matches without conceding a goal as of 14 October 2025. In the tournament, England were ultimately eliminated by the defending champions Argentina in the semi-finals. In the third place match versus France on 18 July, England won 6–4, achieving their best finish at the tournament since 1966.

== Team image ==
=== Kits and crest ===
==== Kit suppliers ====
Kit supplier	Period	Ref
St. Blaize and Hope Brothers	1949–1954	
Umbro	1954–1961	
Bukta	1959–1965	
Umbro	1965–1974	
Admiral	1974–1984	
Umbro	1984–2013	
Nike	2013–present	

==== Kit deals ====
Kit supplier	Period	Contract announcement	Contract duration	Value
Nike	2013–present	3 September 2012	Spring 2013 – July 2018 (5 years)	Total £125m (£25m per year)
Nike	2013–present	13 December 2016	August 2018 – 2030 (12 years)	Total £400m (£33.3m per year)

==== Crest ====
The lion passant guardant used in the logo of the England national football team

The motif of the England national football team has three lions passant guardant, the emblem of King Richard I, who reigned from 1189 to 1199. In 1872, English players wore white jerseys emblazoned with the three lions crest of the Football Association. The lions, often blue, have had minor changes to colour and appearance. Initially topped by a crown, this was removed in 1949 when the FA was given an official coat of arms by the College of Arms; this introduced ten Tudor roses, one for each of the regional branches of the FA. Since 2003, England top their logo with a star to recognise their World Cup win in 1966; this was first embroidered onto the left sleeve of the home kit, and a year later was moved to its current position, first on the away shirt.

==== Colours ====
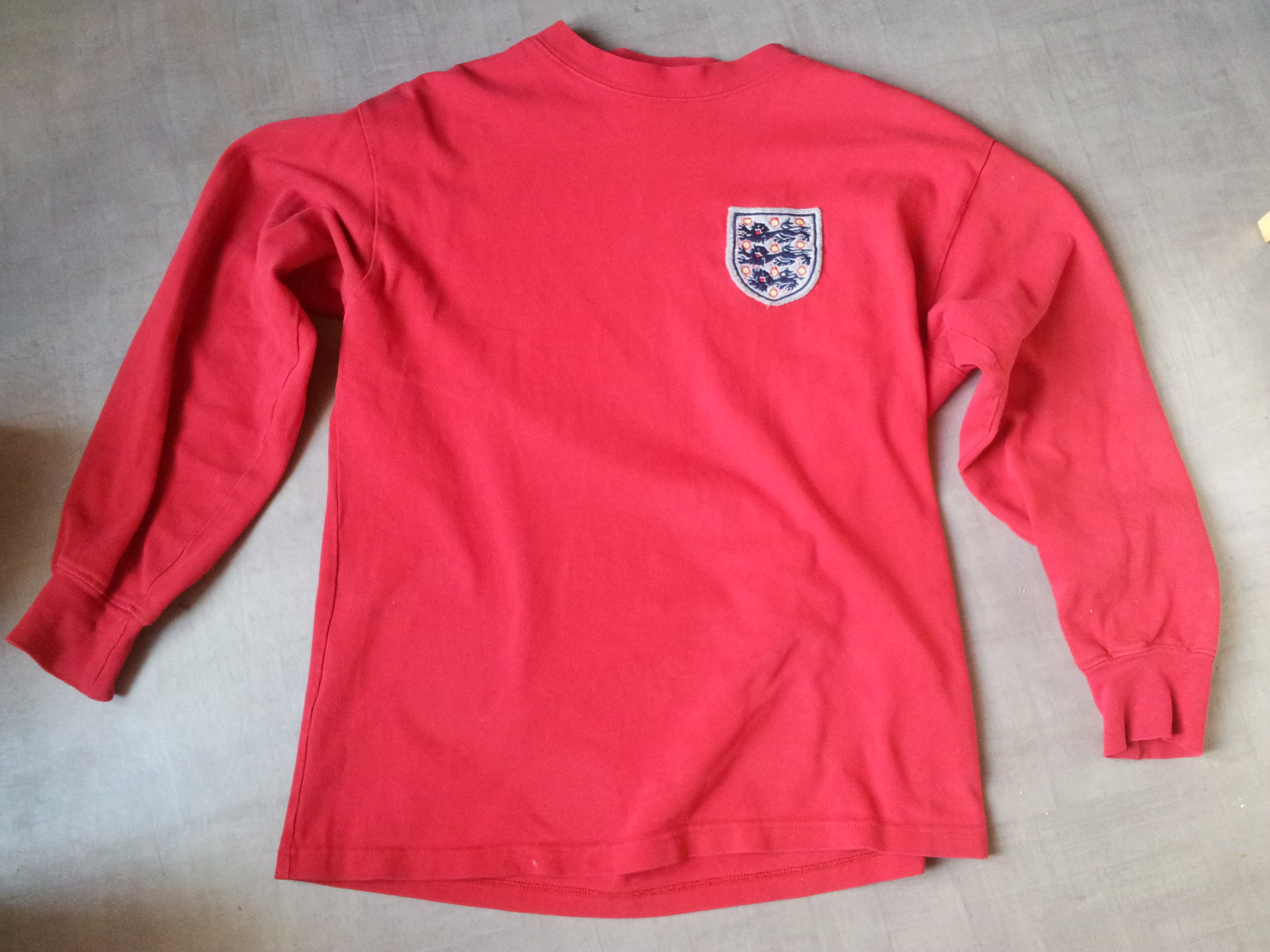
England shirt for the 1966 World Cup final

England's traditional home colours are white shirts, navy blue shorts and white or black socks. The team has periodically worn an all-white kit.

Although England's first away kits were blue, England's traditional away colours are red shirts, white shorts and red socks. In 1996, England's away kit was changed to grey shirts, shorts and socks. This kit was only worn three times, including against Germany in the semi-final of Euro 1996 but the deviation from the traditional red was unpopular with supporters and the England away kit remained red until 2011, when a navy blue away kit was introduced. The away kit is also sometimes worn during home matches, when a new edition has been released to promote it.

England have occasionally had a third kit. At the 1970 World Cup, England wore a third kit with pale blue shirts, shorts and socks against Czechoslovakia. They had a kit similar to Brazil's, with yellow shirts, yellow socks and blue shorts which they wore in the summer of 1973. For the 1986 World Cup, England had a third kit of pale blue, imitating that worn in Mexico 16 years earlier and England retained pale blue third kits until 1992, but they were rarely used.

Umbro first agreed to manufacture the kit in 1954 and since then has supplied most of the kits, the exceptions being from 1959 to 1965 with Bukta and 1974–1984 with Admiral. Nike purchased Umbro in 2008 and took over as kit supplier in 2013 following their sale of the Umbro brand.

=== Home stadium ===
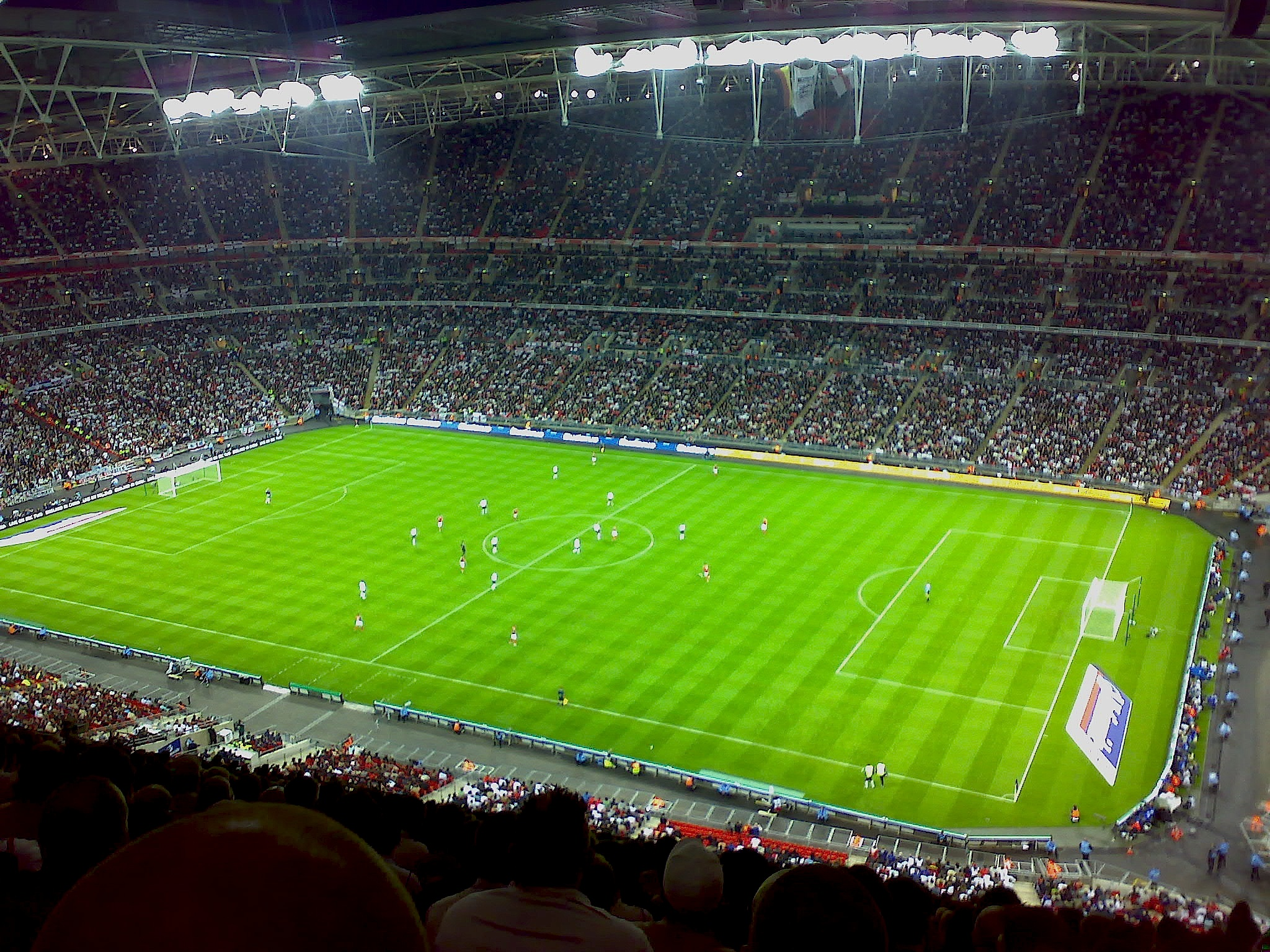
Wembley Stadium during a friendly match between England and Germany

For the first 50 years of their existence, England played their home matches all around the country. They initially used cricket grounds before later moving on to football club stadiums. The original Empire Stadium was built in Wembley, London, for the British Empire Exhibition.

England played their first match at the stadium in 1924 against Scotland and for the next 27 years Wembley was used as a venue for matches against Scotland only. The stadium later became known simply as Wembley Stadium and it became England's permanent home stadium during the 1950s. In October 2000, the stadium closed its doors, ending with a defeat against Germany.

This stadium was demolished during the period of 2002–03, and work began to completely rebuild it. During this time, England played at venues across the country, though by the time of the 2006 World Cup qualification, this had largely settled down to having Manchester United's Old Trafford stadium as the primary venue, with Newcastle United's St. James' Park used on occasions when Old Trafford was unavailable.

Their first match in the new Wembley Stadium was in March 2007 when they drew with Brazil. The stadium is now owned by the Football Association, via its subsidiary Wembley National Stadium Limited.

=== Rivalries ===
England's three main rivalries are with Scotland, Germany, and Argentina. Smaller rivalries with France, Wales, and the Republic of Ireland have also been observed.

==== Scotland ====
England's rivalry with Scotland is one of the fiercest international rivalries that exists. It is the oldest international fixture in the world, first played in 1872 at Hamilton Crescent, Glasgow. The history of the British Isles has led to much rivalry between the nations in many forms, and the social and cultural effects of centuries of antagonism and conflict between the two has contributed to the intense nature of the sporting contests. Scottish nationalism has also been a factor in the Scots' desire to defeat England above all other rivals, with Scottish sports journalists traditionally referring to the English as the "Auld Enemy". The footballing rivalry has diminished somewhat since the late 1970s, particularly since the annual fixture stopped in 1989. For England, games against Germany and Argentina are now considered to be more important than the historic rivalry with Scotland.

==== Germany ====
England's rivalry with Germany is considered to be mainly an English phenomenon—in the run-up to any competition match between the two teams, many UK newspapers will print articles detailing results of previous encounters, such as England's win in the 1966 World Cup final and the semi-final penalty shoot-out defeats of the 1990 World Cup and Euro 96. This rivalry has diminished in recent years. Germans consider Italy, the Netherlands, and France to be their greater rivals.

==== Argentina ====
England's rivalry with Argentina is highly competitive. Games between the two teams, even those that are only friendly matches, are often marked by notable and sometimes controversial incidents such as the hand of God in 1986. The rivalry is unusual in that it is an intercontinental one; typically such footballing rivalries exist between bordering nations. England is regarded in Argentina as one of the major rivals of the national football team, matched only by Brazil and Uruguay. The rivalry is, to a lesser extent reciprocal in England, locally described as a grudge match. The rivalry emerged across several games during the latter half of the 20th century, even though as of 2026 the teams have played each other on only 15 occasions in full internationals. The rivalry was intensified, particularly in Argentina, by non-footballing events, especially the 1982 Falklands War between Argentina and the United Kingdom. England and Argentina last met in the 2026 FIFA World Cup semi-final in Atlanta, with Argentina winning 2–1 to reach the final, after going a goal down.

=== Songs ===
Numerous songs have been released about the England national football team.

=== Media coverage ===
All England matches are broadcast with full commentary on Talksport and BBC Radio 5 Live. From the 2008–09 season until the 2017–18 season, England's home and away qualifiers, and friendlies both home and away were broadcast live on ITV Sport (often with the exception of STV, the ITV franchisee in central and northern Scotland). England's away qualifiers for the 2010 World Cup were shown on Setanta Sports until that company's collapse. As a result of Setanta Sports's demise, England's World Cup qualifier in Ukraine on 10 October 2009 was shown in the United Kingdom on a pay-per-view basis via the internet only. This one-off event was the first time an England game had been screened in such a way. The number of subscribers, paying between £4.99 and £11.99 each, was estimated at between 250,000 and 300,000 and the total number of viewers at around 500,000. In 2018, Sky Sports broadcast the England UEFA Nations League and in-season friendlies, until 2021 and ITV Sport broadcast the European qualifiers for Euro-World Cups and pre-tournament friendlies (after the Nations League group matches end), until 2022. In April 2022, Channel 4 won the rights for England matches until June 2024, including 2022–23 UEFA Nations League matches, Euro 2024 qualifying games, and friendlies. 2022 World Cup rights remained with the BBC and ITV.

== Results and fixtures ==
The following is a list of match results in the last 12 months, as well as any future matches that have been scheduled.

Win Draw Loss Fixture

=== 2026 ===
27 March 2026 International Friendly	England	1–1	Uruguay	London, England
19:45 GMT (UTC±0)	White 81'	Report	Valverde 90+4' (pen.)	Stadium: Wembley Stadium; Attendance: 80,581; Referee: Sven Jablonski (Germany)

31 March 2026 International Friendly	England	0–1	Japan	London, England
19:45 BST (UTC+1)		Report	Mitoma 23'	Stadium: Wembley Stadium; Attendance: 79,233; Referee: Nick Walsh (Scotland)

6 June 2026 International Friendly	England	1–0	New Zealand	Tampa, United States
16:00 EST (UTC-5)	Kane 45+2'	Report		Stadium: Raymond James Stadium; Attendance: 25,889; Referee: Natalie Simon (United States)

10 June 2026 International Friendly	England	3–0	Costa Rica	Orlando, United States
16:00 EST (UTC-5)	Rice 9'; Gordon 68' (pen.); Watkins 87'	Report		Stadium: Inter&Co Stadium; Attendance: 25,500; Referee: Katja Koroleva (United States)

17 June 2026 2026 FIFA World Cup Group L	England	4–2	Croatia	Arlington, United States
15:00 EST (UTC-5)	Kane 12' (pen.), 42'; Bellingham 47'; Rashford 85'	Report	Baturina 36'; Musa 45+5'	Stadium: AT&T Stadium; Attendance: 70,389; Referee: Clément Turpin (France)

23 June 2026 2026 FIFA World Cup Group L	England	0–0	Ghana	Foxborough, United States
16:00 EDT (UTC-4)		Report		Stadium: Gillette Stadium; Attendance: 63,983; Referee: Saíd Martínez (Honduras)

27 June 2026 2026 FIFA World Cup Group L	Panama	0–2	England	East Rutherford, United States
17:00 EDT (UTC-4)		Report	Bellingham 62'; Kane 67'	Stadium: MetLife Stadium; Attendance: 80,663; Referee: Abdulrahman Al-Jassim (Qatar)

1 July 2026 2026 FIFA World Cup Round of 32	England	2–1	DR Congo	Atlanta, United States
12:00 EDT (UTC-4)	Kane 75', 86'	Report	Cipenga 7'	Stadium: Mercedes-Benz Stadium; Attendance: 68,239; Referee: Adham Makhadmeh (Jordan)

5 July 2026 2026 FIFA World Cup Round of 16	Mexico	2–3	England	Mexico City, Mexico
19:00 CST (UTC-6)	Quiñones 42'; Jiménez 69' (pen.)	Report	Bellingham 36', 38'; Kane 60' (pen.)	Stadium: Estadio Azteca; Attendance: 80,824; Referee: Alireza Faghani (Australia)

11 July 2026 2026 FIFA World Cup Quarter-final	Norway	1–2 (a.e.t.)	England	Miami Gardens, United States
17:00 EDT (UTC-4)	Schjelderup 36'	Report	Bellingham 45+2', 93'	Stadium: Hard Rock Stadium; Attendance: 64,478; Referee: Clément Turpin (France)

15 July 2026 2026 FIFA World Cup Semi-final	England	1–2	Argentina	Atlanta, United States
15:00 EDT (UTC-4)	Gordon 55'	Report	Fernández 85'; La. Martínez 90+2'	Stadium: Mercedes-Benz Stadium; Attendance: 68,239; Referee: Ismail Elfath (United States)

18 July 2026 2026 FIFA World Cup Third place	France	4–6	England	Miami Gardens, United States
17:00 EDT (UTC-4)	Mbappé 48', 66'; Barcola 54'; Dembélé 90+6'	Report	Rice 3'; Konsa 18'; Saka 37', 45+1', 87' (pen.); Bellingham 90+8'	Stadium: Hard Rock Stadium; Attendance: 64,478; Referee: Jesús Valenzuela (Venezuela)

26 September 2026 2026–27 UEFA Nations League A Group 3	England	2–3	Spain	London, England
19:45 UTC+1	Gordon 36'; Kane 40'	Report	Yamal 2'; Baena 60'; Oyarzabal 74'	Stadium: Wembley Stadium; Attendance: 84,525; Referee: Davide Massa (Italy)

29 September 2026 2026–27 UEFA Nations League A Group 3	Czech Republic	0–2	England	Prague, Czech Republic
20:45 UTC+2		Report	Gordon 47'; Kane 69'	Stadium: Fortuna Arena; Attendance: 18,930; Referee: Halil Umut Meler (Turkey)

3 October 2026 2026–27 UEFA Nations League A Group 3	Croatia	0–7	England	Rijeka, Croatia
18:00 UTC+2		Report	Kane 8', 53'; Bellingham 21'; Gordon 39'; Saka 45', 68'; Rogers 87'	Stadium: Stadion Rujevica; Attendance: 6,342; Referee: Sven Jablonski (Germany)

6 October 2026 2026–27 UEFA Nations League A Group 3	England	3–0	Czech Republic	London, England
19:45 UTC+1	Coufal 27' (o.g.); Kane 40', 57'	Report		Stadium: Wembley Stadium; Attendance: 78,864; Referee: Serdar Gözübüyük (Netherlands)

12 November 2026 2026–27 UEFA Nations League A Group 3	England	2–1	Croatia	London, England
19:45 UTC+0	Rogers 24'; Kane 64' (pen.)	Report	P. Sučić 59'	Stadium: Wembley Stadium; Attendance: 80,484; Referee: Morten Krogh (Denmark)

15 November 2026 2026–27 UEFA Nations League A Group 3	Spain	2–3	England	Madrid, Spain
20:45 UTC+1	Oyarzabal 65' (pen.); Williams 75'	Report	Kane 45' (pen.); Konsa 53'; White 57'	Stadium: Estadio Metropolitano; Attendance: 63,788; Referee: Clément Turpin (France)

=== 2027 ===
27 March 2027 2026–27 UEFA Nations League Quarter-final 1st leg	Norway	v	England	Oslo, Norway
18:00 CET (UTC+01:00)		Report		Stadium: Ullevaal Stadion

30 March 2027 2026–27 UEFA Nations League Quarter-final 2nd leg	England	v	Norway	London, England
19:45 GMT (UTC+00:00)		Report		Stadium: Wembley Stadium

== Coaching staff ==
As of 26 February 2025

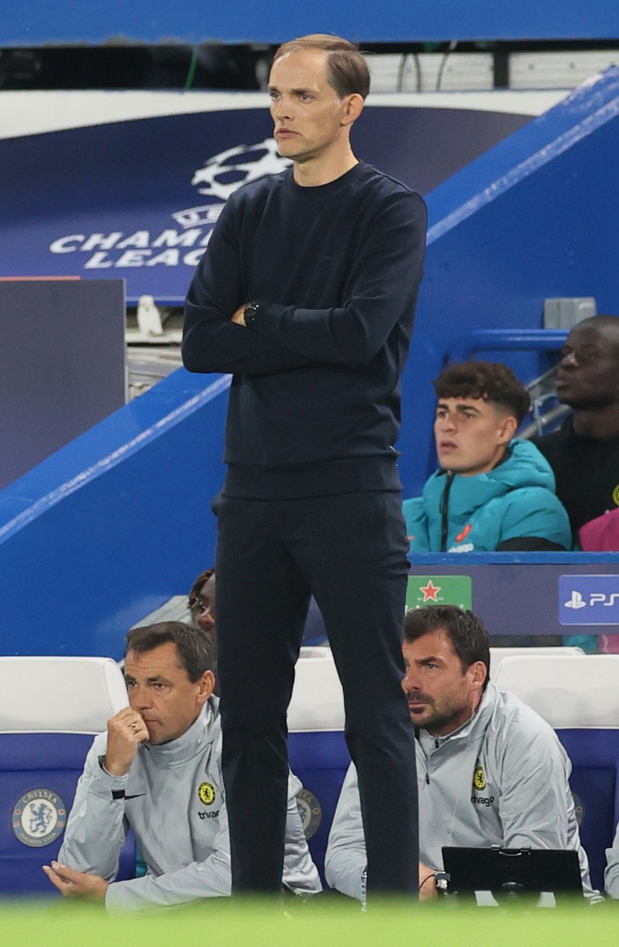
Thomas Tuchel is the current head coach

Position	Name
Manager	(Germany) Thomas Tuchel
Assistant manager	(England) Anthony Barry
Goalkeeping coach	(Portugal) Henrique Hilário
Coach	(Antigua and Barbuda) Justin Cochrane
First-team doctor	(England) Mark Williams
Head of physical performance	(England) Steve Kemp
Physical performance coaches	(England) Hailu Theodros
Physical performance coaches	(France) Nicolas Mayer
Nutritionist	(England) Mike Naylor
Head of performance medicine	(England) Charlotte Cowie
Lead performance doctor	(England) Mark Williams
Lead physiotherapist	(England) Simon Spencer
Analyst	(England) James Melbourne
Head of performance	(England) Mark Jarvis

== Players ==
=== Current squad ===
The following 26 players were named in the squad for the 2026–27 UEFA Nations League A matches against Croatia and Spain on 12 and 15 November 2026, respectively. Marc Guéhi withdrew from the squad due to injury on 9 November and was replaced with Dan Burn. James Hill was called up to the squad on 10 November.

Caps and goals are correct as of 15 November 2026, after the match against Spain.

No.	Pos.	Player	Date of birth (age)	Caps	Goals	Club
1	GK	Jordan Pickford	7 March 1994 (age 32)	94	0	(The Football Association) Everton
13	GK	James Trafford	10 October 2002 (age 24)	5	0	(The Football Association) Leeds United
23	GK	Jason Steele	18 August 1990 (age 36)	0	0	(The Football Association) Brighton & Hove Albion
2	DF	Trent Alexander-Arnold	7 October 1998 (age 28)	37	4	(Royal Spanish Football Federation) Real Madrid
3	DF	Lewis Hall	8 September 2004 (age 22)	9	0	(The Football Association) Newcastle United
5	DF	Ezri Konsa	23 October 1997 (age 29)	31	3	(The Football Association) Arsenal
6	DF	Jarell Quansah	29 January 2003 (age 23)	11	0	(German Football Association) Bayer Leverkusen
12	DF	Ben White	8 October 1997 (age 29)	8	2	(The Football Association) Arsenal
14	DF	Djed Spence	9 August 2000 (age 26)	15	0	(Italian Football Federation) Inter Milan
15	DF	Dan Burn	9 May 1992 (age 34)	13	0	(The Football Association) Newcastle United
18	DF	James Hill	10 January 2002 (age 24)	0	0	(The Football Association) Bournemouth
	DF	Jarrad Branthwaite	27 June 2002 (age 24)	3	0	(The Football Association) Everton
4	MF	Declan Rice (vice-captain)	14 January 1999 (age 27)	82	8	(The Football Association) Arsenal
7	MF	Morgan Gibbs-White	27 January 2000 (age 26)	10	0	(The Football Association) Nottingham Forest
8	MF	Elliot Anderson	6 November 2002 (age 24)	23	0	(The Football Association) Manchester City
10	MF	Jude Bellingham	29 June 2003 (age 23)	62	14	(Royal Spanish Football Federation) Real Madrid
16	MF	Jobe Bellingham	23 September 2005 (age 21)	0	0	(German Football Association) Borussia Dortmund
22	MF	Myles Lewis-Skelly	26 September 2006 (age 20)	11	1	(The Football Association) Arsenal
	MF	James Garner	13 March 2001 (age 25)	6	0	(The Football Association) Everton
	MF	Josh King	3 January 2007 (age 19)	0	0	(The Football Association) Fulham
9	FW	Harry Kane (captain)	28 July 1993 (age 33)	127	93	(German Football Association) Bayern Munich
11	FW	Anthony Gordon	24 February 2001 (age 25)	30	7	(Royal Spanish Football Federation) Barcelona
17	FW	Morgan Rogers	26 July 2002 (age 24)	28	3	(The Football Association) Chelsea
19	FW	Dominic Calvert-Lewin	16 March 1997 (age 29)	15	4	(The Football Association) Leeds United
20	FW	Rio Ngumoha	29 August 2008 (age 18)	4	0	(The Football Association) Liverpool
21	FW	Eberechi Eze	29 June 1998 (age 28)	25	3	(The Football Association) Arsenal

=== Recent call-ups ===
The following players have also been called up to the England squad within the last twelve months.

Pos.	Player	Date of birth (age)	Caps	Goals	Club	Latest call-up
GK	Dean Henderson	12 March 1997 (age 29)	6	0	(England) Crystal Palace	2026 FIFA World Cup
GK	Aaron Ramsdale	14 May 1998 (age 28)	5	0	(England) Southampton	v. Japan, 31 March 2026 ^{WD}
DF	Marc Guéhi	13 July 2000 (age 26)	41	1	(England) Manchester City	v. Croatia, 12 November 2026 ^{INJ}
DF	Rico Lewis	21 December 2004 (age 21)	5	0	(England) Manchester City	v. Czech Republic, 6 October 2026
DF	Trevoh Chalobah	5 July 1999 (age 27)	3	0	(Italy) Como	v. Czech Republic, 6 October 2026
DF	Nico O'Reilly	21 March 2005 (age 21)	13	0	(England) Manchester City	v. Croatia, 3 October 2026 ^{INJ}
DF	Tino Livramento	12 November 2002 (age 24)	6	0	(England) Newcastle United	v. Spain, 26 September 2026 ^{INJ}
DF	John Stones	28 May 1994 (age 32)	94	3	(Italy) Inter Milan	2026 FIFA World Cup
DF	Reece James	8 December 1999 (age 26)	29	1	(England) Chelsea	2026 FIFA World Cup
DF	Harry Maguire	5 March 1993 (age 33)	66	7	(England) Manchester United	v. Japan, 31 March 2026
DF	Fikayo Tomori	19 December 1997 (age 28)	6	0	(Italy) AC Milan	v. Japan, 31 March 2026 ^{WD}
MF	Alex Scott	21 August 2003 (age 23)	2	0	(England) Bournemouth	v. Czech Republic, 6 October 2026 ^{INJ}
MF	Cole Palmer	6 May 2002 (age 24)	14	2	(England) Chelsea	v. Spain, 26 September 2026 ^{INJ}
MF	Kobbie Mainoo	19 April 2005 (age 21)	14	0	(England) Manchester United	v. Spain, 26 September 2026 ^{INJ}
MF	Jordan Henderson	17 June 1990 (age 36)	91	3	(England) Chelsea	2026 FIFA World Cup
MF	Ethan Nwaneri	21 March 2007 (age 19)	0	0	(Germany) Borussia Dortmund	v. Costa Rica, 10 June 2026
MF	Adam Wharton	6 February 2004 (age 22)	4	0	(England) Crystal Palace	v. Japan, 31 March 2026 ^{INJ}
FW	Bukayo Saka	5 September 2001 (age 25)	59	19	(England) Arsenal	v. Czech Republic, 6 October 2026
FW	Marcus Rashford	31 October 1997 (age 29)	78	19	(England) Manchester United	v. Spain, 26 September 2026 ^{INJ}
FW	Ollie Watkins	30 December 1995 (age 30)	24	7	(Saudi Arabia) Al-Hilal	2026 FIFA World Cup
FW	Noni Madueke	10 March 2002 (age 24)	16	1	(England) Arsenal	2026 FIFA World Cup
FW	Ivan Toney	16 March 1996 (age 30)	10	1	(Saudi Arabia) Al-Ahli	2026 FIFA World Cup
FW	Phil Foden	28 May 2000 (age 26)	49	4	(England) Manchester City	v. Japan, 31 March 2026
FW	Jarrod Bowen	20 December 1996 (age 29)	22	1	(England) West Ham United	v. Japan, 31 March 2026
FW	Dominic Solanke	14 September 1997 (age 29)	5	0	(England) Tottenham Hotspur	v. Japan, 31 March 2026
FW	Harvey Barnes	9 December 1997 (age 28)	2	0	(England) Newcastle United	v. Japan, 31 March 2026
^{INJ} Withdrew due to injury^{PRE} Preliminary squad / standby^{RET} Retired from the national team^{SUS} Serving suspension^{WD} Player withdrew from the squad due to non-injury issue.

== Individual records ==
=== Most appearances ===
As of 15 November 2026

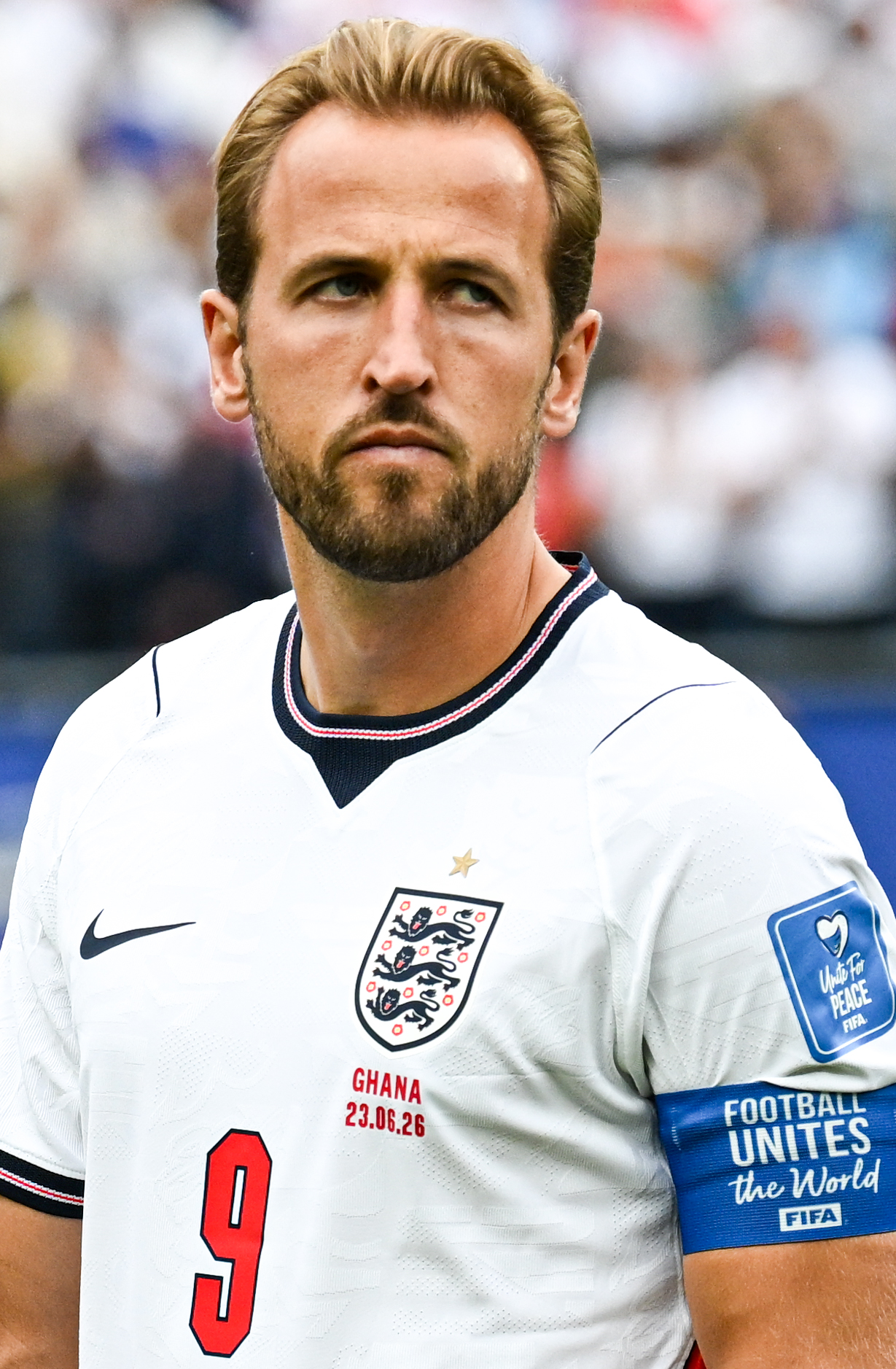
Harry Kane is England's most capped player with 127 appearances and all-time top scorer with 93 goals.

Rank	Player	Caps	Goals	Position	Career
1	Harry Kane	127	93	FW	2015–present
2	Peter Shilton	125	0	GK	1970–1990
3	Wayne Rooney	120	53	FW	2003–2018
4	David Beckham	115	17	MF	1996–2009
5	Steven Gerrard	114	21	MF	2000–2014
6	Bobby Moore	108	2	DF	1962–1973
7	Ashley Cole	107	0	DF	2001–2014
8	Bobby Charlton	106	49	MF	1958–1970
8	Frank Lampard	106	29	MF	1999–2014
10	Billy Wright	105	3	DF	1946–1959

=== Top goalscorers ===
As of 15 November 2026

Rank	Player	Goals	Caps	Average	Career
1	Harry Kane (list)	93	127	0.73	2015–present
2	Wayne Rooney (list)	53	120	0.44	2003–2018
3	Bobby Charlton (list)	49	106	0.46	1958–1970
4	Gary Lineker	48	80	0.60	1984–1992
5	Jimmy Greaves	44	57	0.77	1959–1967
6	Michael Owen	40	89	0.45	1998–2008
7	Nat Lofthouse	30	33	0.91	1950–1958
7	Alan Shearer	30	63	0.48	1992–2000
7	Tom Finney	30	76	0.39	1946–1958
10	Vivian Woodward	29	23	1.26	1903–1911
10	Frank Lampard	29	106	0.27	1999–2014

=== Most clean sheets ===
A clean sheet is a match where a team does not concede any goals to their opponent.

As of 15 November 2026

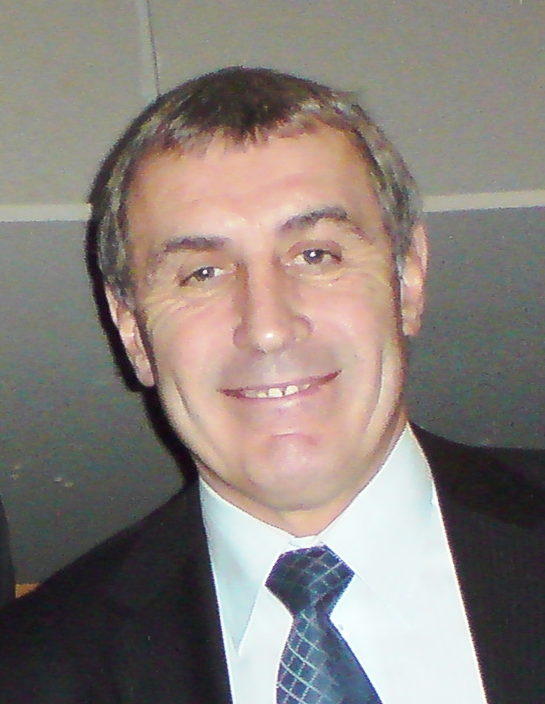
Peter Shilton is England's record holder in clean sheets.

Rank	Player	Clean sheets	Caps	Average	Career
1	Peter Shilton	66	125	0.53	1970–1990
2	Jordan Pickford	49	94	0.52	2017–present
3	Joe Hart	43	75	0.57	2008–2017
4	David Seaman	40	75	0.53	1988–2002
5	Gordon Banks	35	73	0.48	1963–1972
6	Ray Clemence	27	61	0.44	1972–1983
7	Chris Woods	26	43	0.60	1985–1993
8	Paul Robinson	24	41	0.59	2003–2007
9	David James	21	53	0.40	1997–2010
10	Nigel Martyn	13	23	0.57	1992–2002

=== Manager records ===
Most manager appearances
Walter Winterbottom: 139
Highest win ratio (minimum 25 games in charge, including friendlies)
Thomas Tuchel: 76.9%
Most wins in major tournaments
Gareth Southgate: 14
Youngest to take job
Walter Winterbottom: 33 years old
Oldest to take job
Roy Hodgson: 64 years old

== Team records ==
Biggest win (Note: England's two largest victories (13–0 away and then 13–2 at home) coincidentally both occurred on 18 February, against Ireland. Four of England's five largest margins of victory occurred away from home. As well as the 13–0 victory, they defeated Austria 11–1 in 1908, Portugal 10–0 in 1947, United States 10–0 in 1964 and San Marino 10–0 in 2021.)
13–0 vs. Ireland, 18 February 1882
Biggest defeat
1–7 vs. Hungary, 23 May 1954
Longest unbeaten run
22 games from 18 November 2020 to 29 March 2022
Longest winless run
7 games from 11 May 1958 to 4 October 1958
Most consecutive wins
10 games from 6 June 1908 to 1 June 1909
Most consecutive matches without conceding a goal
7 games from 2 June 2021 to 3 July 2021

== Competitive record ==
Champions Runners-up Third place Tournament played on home soil

=== FIFA World Cup ===
1966 World Cup final lineups: England (red) vs. West Germany

England first appeared at the 1950 FIFA World Cup, and have subsequently qualified for a total of 17 World Cup tournaments, tied for sixth best by number of appearances. They are also placed sixth by number of wins, with 38. The national team is one of only eight nations to have won at least one FIFA World Cup title. The England team won their first and only World Cup title in 1966. The tournament was played on home soil, and England defeated West Germany 4–2 in the final. Their highest placing since occurred in 2026, where they placed third. In 1990, England finished in fourth place, losing 2–1 to host nation Italy in the match for third place, following defeat on penalties, after extra time, to champions West Germany in the semi-final. They also finished in fourth place in 2018, losing 2–0 to Belgium in the match for third place, following a 2–1 defeat to Croatia, again after extra time, in the semi-final. The team also reached the quarter-final stage in 1954, 1962, 1970, 1986, 2002, 2006, and 2022.

England failed to qualify for the World Cup in 1974, 1978, and 1994. The team's earliest exit in the finals tournament was elimination in the first round in 1950, 1958 and, most recently, 2014. This was after being defeated in both their opening two matches for the first time, against Italy and Uruguay in Group D. In 1950, four teams remained after the first round, in 1958 eight teams remained and in 2014 sixteen teams remained. In 2010, England suffered its most resounding World Cup defeat, 4–1 to Germany, in the round of 16 stage.

FIFA World Cup record										Qualification record						Manager(s)
Year	Round	Pos	Pld	W	D (Note: Draws include knockout matches decided by a penalty shoot-out.)	L	GF	GA	Squad	Pld	W	D	L	GF	GA	Manager(s)
(Uruguay) 1930	Not a FIFA member									Not a FIFA member						None
(Kingdom of Italy) 1934	Not a FIFA member									Not a FIFA member						None
(French Fourth Republic) 1938	Not a FIFA member									Not a FIFA member						None
(Fourth Brazilian Republic) 1950	Group stage	8th	3	1	0	2	2	2	Squad	3	3	0	0	14	3	Winterbottom
(Switzerland) 1954	Quarter-finals	7th	3	1	1	1	8	8	Squad	3	3	0	0	11	4	Winterbottom
(Sweden) 1958	Group stage	11th	4	0	3	1	4	5	Squad	4	3	1	0	15	5	Winterbottom
(Chile) 1962	Quarter-finals	8th	4	1	1	2	5	6	Squad	4	3	1	0	16	2	Winterbottom
(England) 1966	Champions	1st	6	5	1	0	11	3	Squad	Qualified as hosts						Ramsey
(Mexico) 1970	Quarter-finals	8th	4	2	0	2	4	4	Squad	Qualified as defending champions						Ramsey
(West Germany) 1974	Did not qualify									4	1	2	1	3	4	Ramsey
(Argentina) 1978	Did not qualify									6	5	0	1	15	4	Revie
(Spain) 1982	Second group stage	6th	5	3	2	0	6	1	Squad	8	4	1	3	13	8	Greenwood
(Mexico) 1986	Quarter-finals	8th	5	2	1	2	7	3	Squad	8	4	4	0	21	2	Robson
(Italy) 1990	Fourth place	4th	7	3	3	1	8	6	Squad	6	3	3	0	10	0	Robson
(United States) 1994	Did not qualify									10	5	3	2	26	9	Taylor
(France) 1998	Round of 16	9th	4	2	1	1	7	4	Squad	8	6	1	1	15	2	Hoddle
(South Korea) (Japan) 2002 (Note: England played all of their matches in Japan.)	Quarter-finals	6th	5	2	2	1	6	3	Squad	8	5	2	1	16	6	Keegan, Wilkinson, Eriksson (Note: Kevin Keegan and Howard Wilkinson managed one qualifying match each: Sven-Göran Eriksson managed the remaining qualification matches and the finals campaign.)
(Germany) 2006	Quarter-finals	7th	5	3	2	0	6	2	Squad	10	8	1	1	17	5	Eriksson
(South Africa) 2010	Round of 16	13th	4	1	2	1	3	5	Squad	10	9	0	1	34	6	Capello
(Brazil) 2014	Group stage	26th	3	0	1	2	2	4	Squad	10	6	4	0	31	4	Hodgson
(Russia) 2018	Fourth place	4th	7	3	1	3	12	8	Squad	10	8	2	0	18	3	Allardyce, Southgate (Note: Sam Allardyce managed one qualifying match: Gareth Southgate managed the remaining qualification matches and the finals campaign.)
(Qatar) 2022	Quarter-finals	6th	5	3	1	1	13	4	Squad	10	8	2	0	39	3	Southgate
(Canada) (Mexico) (United States) 2026	Third place	3rd	8	6	1	1	20	12	Squad	8	8	0	0	22	0	Tuchel
(Morocco) (Portugal) (Spain) 2030 (Note: Additional matches are scheduled to be played in Argentina, Paraguay, and Uruguay in commemoration of the 100th anniversary of the first world cup, however they are not considered to be official hosts of the tournament.)	To be determined									To be determined						
(Saudi Arabia) 2034	To be determined									To be determined						
Total	1 Title	17/23	82	38	23	21	124	80	—	130	92	27	11	336	70	—

Correct as of 18 July 2026

=== UEFA European Championship ===
Euro 2020 final lineups: England (white) vs. Italy

Euro 2024 final lineups: England (white) vs. Spain

England first entered the UEFA European Championship in 1964, and have since qualified for eleven tournaments, tied for fourth-best by number of finals appearances. England's best results at the tournament were finishing as runners-up in both the 2020 (held in 2021) and 2024 editions, followed by a third-place finish in 1968 and reaching the semi-finals of 1996, a tournament they hosted. In addition, England have reached the quarter-finals on two further occasions, in 2004 and 2012.

England's worst results in the finals tournament to date have been first round eliminations in 1980, 1988, 1992 and 2000, whilst they failed to qualify for the finals in 1964, 1972, 1976, 1984 and 2008.

UEFA European Championship record										Qualification record						Manager(s)
Year	Round	Pos	Pld	W	D	L	GF	GA	Squad	Pld	W	D	L	GF	GA	Manager(s)
(France) 1960	Did not enter									Did not enter						Winterbottom
(Francoist Spain) 1964	Did not qualify									2	0	1	1	3	6	Winterbottom, Ramsey (Note: England were defeated by France in a two-legged elimination round. Alf Ramsey took over from Walter Winterbottom between the two legs.)
(Italy) 1968	Third place	3rd	2	1	0	1	2	1	Squad	8	6	1	1	18	6	Ramsey
(Belgium) 1972	Did not qualify									8	5	2	1	16	6	Ramsey
(Socialist Federal Republic of Yugoslavia) 1976	Did not qualify									6	3	2	1	11	3	Revie
(Italy) 1980	Group stage	6th	3	1	1	1	3	3	Squad	8	7	1	0	22	5	Greenwood
(France) 1984	Did not qualify									8	5	2	1	23	3	Robson
(West Germany) 1988	Group stage	7th	3	0	0	3	2	7	Squad	6	5	1	0	19	1	Robson
(Sweden) 1992	Group stage	7th	3	0	2	1	1	2	Squad	6	3	3	0	7	3	Taylor
(England) 1996	Semi-finals	4th	5	2	3	0	8	3	Squad	Qualified as hosts						Venables
(Belgium) (Netherlands) 2000	Group stage	11th	3	1	0	2	5	6	Squad	10	4	4	2	16	5	Hoddle, Keegan (Note: Glenn Hoddle managed the first three qualifiers, while Kevin Keegan managed the remaining qualification matches and the finals campaign.)
(Portugal) 2004	Quarter-finals	5th	4	2	1	1	10	6	Squad	8	6	2	0	14	5	Eriksson
(Austria) (Switzerland) 2008	Did not qualify									12	7	2	3	24	7	McClaren
(Poland) (Ukraine) 2012	Quarter-finals	5th	4	2	2	0	5	3	Squad	8	5	3	0	17	5	Capello, Hodgson (Note: Fabio Capello managed the qualification campaign. He resigned before the final tournament and was replaced by Roy Hodgson.)
(France) 2016	Round of 16	12th	4	1	2	1	4	4	Squad	10	10	0	0	31	3	Hodgson
(Europe) 2020 (Note: The tournament was held in 11 cities in 11 UEFA countries. London's Wembley Stadium hosted all of England's games except for their quarter-final match which was hosted at the Stadio Olimpico in Rome.)	Runners-up	2nd	7	5	2	0	11	2	Squad	8	7	0	1	37	6	Southgate
(Germany) 2024	Runners-up	2nd	7	3	3	1	8	6	Squad	8	6	2	0	22	4	Southgate
(United Kingdom) (Republic of Ireland) 2028	To be determined									To be determined						
(Italy) (Turkey) 2032	To be determined									To be determined						
Total	Runners-up	11/17	45	18	16	11	59	43	—	116	79	26	11	280	68	—

Correct as of 14 July 2024

=== UEFA Nations League ===
England have competed in the UEFA Nations League since its inaugural season in 2018–19, when they qualified for the 2019 finals and finished third overall. To date, this is their only appearance in the finals and their best performance in the competition.

UEFA Nations League record
League phase / quarter-finals												Finals									Manager(s)
Season	LG	Grp	Pos	Pld	W	D	L	GF	GA	P/R	IR	Year	Pos	Pld	W	D	L	GF	GA	Squad	Manager(s)
2018–19	A	4	1st	4	2	1	1	6	5	Same position	4th	(Portugal) 2019	3rd	2	0	1	1	1	3	Squad	Southgate
2020–21	A	2	3rd	6	3	1	2	7	4	Same position	9th	(Italy) 2021	Did not qualify								Southgate
2022–23	A	3	4th	6	0	3	3	4	10	▼	15th	(Netherlands) 2023	Did not qualify								Southgate
2024–25	B	2	1st	6	5	0	1	16	3	▲	17th	(Germany) 2025	Did not qualify								Carsley
2026–27	A	3	1st	6	5	0	1	19	6	Same position	1st	2027	To be determined								Tuchel
2026–27	A	Quarter-finals		0	0	0	0	0	0	Same position	1st	2027	To be determined								Tuchel
Total				28	15	5	8	52	28	4th		Total	1/4	2	0	1	1	1	3	—	—

Correct as of 6 October 2026

=== Minor tournaments ===
Year	Round	Pos	Pld	W	D	L	GF	GA	Ref
(Brazil) 1964 Taça de Nações	Fourth place	4th	3	0	1	2	2	7	
(United States) 1976 U.S.A. Bicentennial Cup Tournament	Runners-up	2nd	3	2	0	1	6	4	
(Mexico) 1985 Azteca 2000 Tournament	Runners-up	2nd	2	1	0	1	3	1	
(Mexico) 1985 Ciudad de México Cup Tournament	Third place	3rd	2	0	0	2	1	3	
(Scotland) 1985 Rous Cup	Runners-up	2nd	1	0	0	1	0	1	
(England) 1986 Rous Cup	Champions	1st	1	1	0	0	2	1	
(England) (Scotland) 1987 Rous Cup	Runners-up	2nd	2	0	2	0	1	1	
(England) (Scotland) 1988 Rous Cup	Champions	1st	2	1	1	0	2	1	
(England) (Scotland) 1989 Rous Cup	Champions	1st	2	1	1	0	2	0	
1991 England Challenge Cup	Champions	1st	2	1	1	0	5	3	
(England) 1995 Umbro Cup	Runners-up	2nd	3	1	1	1	6	7	
1997 Tournoi de France	Champions	1st	3	2	0	1	3	1	
(England) 2004 FA Summer Tournament	Champions	1st	2	1	1	0	7	2	
Total	6 Titles	13/13	31	11	9	11	42	37	—

== Honours ==
=== Global ===
- FIFA World Cup
  - Champions: 1966
  - Third place: 2026

=== Continental ===
- UEFA European Championship
  - Runners-up: 2020, 2024
  - Third place: 1968
- UEFA Nations League
  - Third place: 2019

=== Regional ===
- British Home Championship
  - Champions (54): 1886^{s}, 1888, 1890^{s}, 1891, 1892, 1893, 1895, 1898, 1899, 1901, 1903^{s}, 1904, 1905, 1906^{s}, 1908^{s}, 1909, 1911, 1912^{s}, 1913, 1927^{s}, 1930, 1931^{s}, 1932, 1935^{s}, 1938, 1939^{s}, 1947, 1948, 1950, 1952^{s}, 1953^{s}, 1954, 1955, 1956^{s}, 1957, 1958^{s}, 1959^{s}, 1960^{s}, 1961, 1964^{s}, 1965, 1966, 1968, 1969, 1970^{s}, 1971, 1972^{s}, 1973, 1974^{s}, 1975, 1978, 1979, 1982, 1983

=== Minor tournaments ===
- Rous Cup
  - Champions: 1986, 1988, 1989
- England Challenge Cup
  - Champions: 1991
- Tournoi de France
  - Champions: 1997
- FA Summer Tournament
  - Champions: 2004

=== Awards ===
- FIFA World Cup Fair Play Trophy: 1990, 1998, 2022

=== Summary ===
Competition	1st place, gold medalist(s)	2nd place, silver medalist(s)	3rd place, bronze medalist(s)	Total
FIFA World Cup	1	0	1	2
UEFA European Championship	0	2	1	3
UEFA Nations League	0	0	1	1
Total	1	2	3	6

Notes

- ^{s} Shared titles.

== See also ==
- Great Britain men's Olympic football team
- United Kingdom national football team
- England national football team manager
- England women's national football team
- England national amateur football team
- England national football B team
- England national football C team

== Notes ==
Achievements
Preceded by 1962 Brazil	World Champions; 1966 (First title)	Succeeded by 1970 Brazil
