= 2019 UEFA Nations League Finals squads =

European football squads

The 2019 UEFA Nations League Finals was an international football tournament held in Portugal from 5 to 9 June 2019. The four national teams involved in the tournament were required to register a squad of 23 players, including three goalkeepers, by 26 May 2019, 10 days prior to the opening match of the tournament. Only players in these squads were eligible to take part in the tournament. In the event that a player on the submitted squad list suffered an injury or illness prior to his team's first match of the tournament, that player could be replaced, provided that the team doctor and a doctor from the UEFA Medical Committee both confirmed that the injury or illness is severe enough to prevent the player's participation in the tournament.

The position listed for each player is per the official squad lists published by UEFA. The age listed for each player is on 5 June 2019, the first day of the tournament. The numbers of caps and goals listed for each player do not include any matches played after the start of the tournament. The club listed is the club for which the player last played a competitive match prior to the tournament. (Note: This is the club a player was last able to play for during the previous season in the event a player did not play a competitive match.) The nationality for each club reflects the national association (not the league) to which the club is affiliated.

== England ==
Manager: Gareth Southgate

England's 27-man preliminary squad was announced on 16 May 2019. The final squad was announced on 27 May.

No.	Pos.	Player	Date of birth (age)	Caps	Goals	Club
1	GK	Jordan Pickford	7 March 1994 (aged 25)	17	0	(England) Everton
2	DF	Kyle Walker	28 May 1990 (aged 29)	46	0	(England) Manchester City
3	DF	Danny Rose	2 July 1990 (aged 28)	26	0	(England) Tottenham Hotspur
4	MF	Eric Dier	15 January 1994 (aged 25)	39	3	(England) Tottenham Hotspur
5	DF	John Stones	28 May 1994 (aged 25)	37	2	(England) Manchester City
6	DF	Harry Maguire	5 March 1993 (aged 26)	18	1	(England) Leicester City
7	MF	Jesse Lingard	15 December 1992 (aged 26)	22	4	(England) Manchester United
8	MF	Jordan Henderson	17 June 1990 (aged 28)	50	0	(England) Liverpool
9	FW	Harry Kane (captain)	28 July 1993 (aged 25)	37	22	(England) Tottenham Hotspur
10	MF	Raheem Sterling	8 December 1994 (aged 24)	49	8	(England) Manchester City
11	FW	Jadon Sancho	25 March 2000 (aged 19)	4	0	(Germany) Borussia Dortmund
12	DF	Joe Gomez	23 May 1997 (aged 22)	6	0	(England) Liverpool
13	GK	Jack Butland	10 March 1993 (aged 26)	9	0	(England) Stoke City
14	DF	Ben Chilwell	21 December 1996 (aged 22)	6	0	(England) Leicester City
15	DF	Michael Keane	11 January 1993 (aged 26)	7	1	(England) Everton
16	MF	Declan Rice	14 January 1999 (aged 20)	2	0	(England) West Ham United
17	MF	Fabian Delph	21 November 1989 (aged 29)	18	0	(England) Manchester City
18	MF	Ross Barkley	5 December 1993 (aged 25)	27	4	(England) Chelsea
19	FW	Marcus Rashford	31 October 1997 (aged 21)	31	6	(England) Manchester United
20	MF	Dele Alli	11 April 1996 (aged 23)	35	3	(England) Tottenham Hotspur
21	FW	Callum Wilson	27 February 1992 (aged 27)	2	1	(England) Bournemouth
22	DF	Trent Alexander-Arnold	7 October 1998 (aged 20)	5	1	(England) Liverpool
23	GK	Tom Heaton	15 April 1986 (aged 33)	3	0	(England) Burnley

== Netherlands ==
Manager: Ronald Koeman

The Netherlands' 28-man preliminary squad was announced on 10 May 2019. Kenny Tete withdrew injured and was replaced by Hans Hateboer. The final squad was announced on 27 May.

No.	Pos.	Player	Date of birth (age)	Caps	Goals	Club
1	GK	Jasper Cillessen	22 April 1989 (aged 30)	48	0	(Spain) Barcelona
2	DF	Hans Hateboer	9 January 1994 (aged 25)	4	0	(Italy) Atalanta
3	DF	Matthijs de Ligt	12 August 1999 (aged 19)	15	1	(Netherlands) Ajax
4	DF	Virgil van Dijk (captain)	8 July 1991 (aged 27)	26	4	(England) Liverpool
5	DF	Nathan Aké	18 February 1995 (aged 24)	10	1	(England) Bournemouth
6	MF	Davy Pröpper	2 September 1991 (aged 27)	14	3	(England) Brighton & Hove Albion
7	FW	Steven Bergwijn	8 October 1997 (aged 21)	5	0	(Netherlands) PSV Eindhoven
8	MF	Georginio Wijnaldum	11 November 1990 (aged 28)	55	11	(England) Liverpool
9	FW	Ryan Babel	19 December 1986 (aged 32)	56	8	(England) Fulham
10	FW	Memphis Depay	13 February 1994 (aged 25)	46	16	(France) Lyon
11	FW	Quincy Promes	4 January 1992 (aged 27)	36	6	(Spain) Sevilla
12	DF	Patrick van Aanholt	29 August 1990 (aged 28)	9	0	(England) Crystal Palace
13	GK	Kenneth Vermeer	10 January 1986 (aged 33)	5	0	(Netherlands) Feyenoord
14	DF	Stefan de Vrij	5 February 1992 (aged 27)	37	3	(Italy) Internazionale
15	MF	Marten de Roon	29 March 1991 (aged 28)	10	0	(Italy) Atalanta
16	MF	Kevin Strootman	13 February 1990 (aged 29)	43	3	(France) Marseille
17	DF	Daley Blind	9 March 1990 (aged 29)	62	2	(Netherlands) Ajax
18	MF	Tonny Vilhena	3 January 1995 (aged 24)	15	0	(Netherlands) Feyenoord
19	FW	Luuk de Jong	27 August 1990 (aged 28)	16	4	(Netherlands) PSV Eindhoven
20	MF	Donny van de Beek	18 April 1997 (aged 22)	5	0	(Netherlands) Ajax
21	MF	Frenkie de Jong	12 May 1997 (aged 22)	7	0	(Netherlands) Ajax
22	DF	Denzel Dumfries	18 April 1996 (aged 23)	5	0	(Netherlands) PSV Eindhoven
23	GK	Marco Bizot	10 March 1991 (aged 28)	0	0	(Netherlands) AZ

== Portugal ==
Manager: Fernando Santos

Portugal's final squad was announced on 23 May 2019.

No.	Pos.	Player	Date of birth (age)	Caps	Goals	Club
1	GK	Rui Patrício	15 February 1988 (aged 31)	79	0	(England) Wolverhampton Wanderers
2	DF	João Cancelo	27 May 1994 (aged 25)	14	3	(Italy) Juventus
3	DF	Pepe	26 February 1983 (aged 36)	105	7	(Portugal) Porto
4	DF	Rúben Dias	14 May 1997 (aged 22)	9	0	(Portugal) Benfica
5	DF	Raphaël Guerreiro	22 December 1993 (aged 25)	32	2	(Germany) Borussia Dortmund
6	DF	José Fonte	22 December 1983 (aged 35)	36	0	(France) Lille
7	FW	Cristiano Ronaldo (captain)	5 February 1985 (aged 34)	156	85	(Italy) Juventus
8	MF	João Moutinho	8 September 1986 (aged 32)	114	7	(England) Wolverhampton Wanderers
9	FW	Dyego Sousa	14 September 1989 (aged 29)	2	0	(Portugal) Braga
10	MF	Bernardo Silva	10 August 1994 (aged 24)	35	3	(England) Manchester City
11	FW	Diogo Jota	4 December 1996 (aged 22)	0	0	(England) Wolverhampton Wanderers
12	GK	José Sá	17 January 1993 (aged 26)	0	0	(Greece) Olympiacos
13	MF	Danilo Pereira	9 September 1991 (aged 27)	32	2	(Portugal) Porto
14	MF	William Carvalho	7 April 1992 (aged 27)	55	2	(Spain) Real Betis
15	MF	Rafa Silva	17 May 1993 (aged 26)	15	0	(Portugal) Benfica
16	MF	Bruno Fernandes	8 September 1994 (aged 24)	11	1	(Portugal) Sporting CP
17	MF	Gonçalo Guedes	29 November 1996 (aged 22)	15	3	(Spain) Valencia
18	MF	Rúben Neves	13 March 1997 (aged 22)	10	0	(England) Wolverhampton Wanderers
19	DF	Mário Rui	27 May 1991 (aged 28)	8	0	(Italy) Napoli
20	DF	Nélson Semedo	16 November 1993 (aged 25)	8	0	(Spain) Barcelona
21	MF	Pizzi	6 October 1989 (aged 29)	14	2	(Portugal) Benfica
22	GK	Beto	1 June 1982 (aged 37)	16	0	(Turkey) Göztepe
23	FW	João Félix	10 November 1999 (aged 19)	0	0	(Portugal) Benfica

== Switzerland ==
Manager: Vladimir Petković

Switzerland's final squad was announced on 27 May 2019. Breel Embolo withdrew injured and was replaced by Noah Okafor on 30 May.

No.	Pos.	Player	Date of birth (age)	Caps	Goals	Club
1	GK	Yann Sommer	17 December 1988 (aged 30)	45	0	(Germany) Borussia Mönchengladbach
2	DF	Kevin Mbabu	19 April 1995 (aged 24)	4	0	(Switzerland) Young Boys
3	DF	François Moubandje	21 June 1990 (aged 28)	21	0	(France) Toulouse
4	DF	Nico Elvedi	30 September 1996 (aged 22)	10	1	(Germany) Borussia Mönchengladbach
5	DF	Manuel Akanji	19 July 1995 (aged 23)	15	0	(Germany) Borussia Dortmund
6	DF	Michael Lang	8 February 1991 (aged 28)	30	3	(Germany) Borussia Mönchengladbach
7	MF	Noah Okafor	24 May 2000 (aged 19)	0	0	(Switzerland) Basel
8	MF	Remo Freuler	15 April 1992 (aged 27)	16	1	(Italy) Atalanta
9	FW	Haris Seferovic	22 February 1992 (aged 27)	59	17	(Portugal) Benfica
10	MF	Granit Xhaka (captain)	27 September 1992 (aged 26)	74	11	(England) Arsenal
11	MF	Renato Steffen	3 November 1991 (aged 27)	6	0	(Germany) VfL Wolfsburg
12	GK	Yvon Mvogo	6 June 1994 (aged 24)	2	0	(Germany) RB Leipzig
13	DF	Ricardo Rodriguez	25 August 1992 (aged 26)	63	6	(Italy) Milan
14	MF	Steven Zuber	17 August 1991 (aged 27)	23	6	(Germany) VfB Stuttgart
15	DF	Loris Benito	7 January 1992 (aged 27)	3	0	(Switzerland) Young Boys
16	FW	Albian Ajeti	26 February 1997 (aged 22)	7	1	(Switzerland) Basel
17	MF	Denis Zakaria	20 November 1996 (aged 22)	20	2	(Germany) Borussia Mönchengladbach
18	MF	Djibril Sow	6 February 1997 (aged 22)	4	0	(Switzerland) Young Boys
19	FW	Josip Drmić	8 August 1992 (aged 26)	32	10	(Germany) Borussia Mönchengladbach
20	MF	Edimilson Fernandes	15 April 1996 (aged 23)	8	0	(Italy) Fiorentina
21	GK	Jonas Omlin	10 January 1994 (aged 25)	0	0	(Switzerland) Basel
22	DF	Fabian Schär	20 December 1991 (aged 27)	48	7	(England) Newcastle United
23	MF	Xherdan Shaqiri	10 October 1991 (aged 27)	80	22	(England) Liverpool
