= R v Terry =

2012 English criminal law case

John Terry
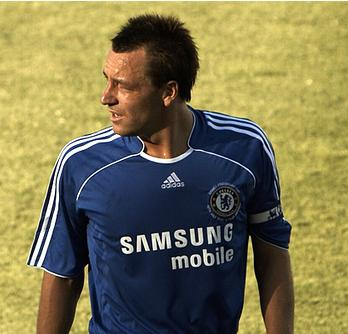
- John Terry (pictured) was found not guilty by the Magistrates
- Court: Westminster Magistrates' Court
- Full case name: Regina v John Terry
- Decided: 13 July 2012
- Charge: Racially aggravated harassment, alarm or distress (Public Order Act 1986, s. 5; Crime and Disorder Act 1998, s. 31(1)(c) and (5))
- Citation: [2012] EW Misc 12 (MC)
- Transcript: Judgment

Case history
- Prior action: None
- Subsequent action: None

Court membership
- Judge sitting: Howard Riddle (Chief Magistrate)

Keywords
- Racism; criminal threshold of racial abuse requiring intent to insult and not repeating back an accusation put; team sportsmen; unlikely but on facts not beyond all reasonable doubt defence of belief recipient made an accusation in alike terms; context of regular taunts and provocative gesture between people involved during game

R v John Terry was a 2012 English criminal law case in which the Chelsea and England defender John Terry was found not guilty of racially abusing the Queens Park Rangers defender Anton Ferdinand in a football match between Chelsea and Queens Park Rangers on 23 October 2011. The prosecution, acquittal and civil inquiry and penalty by the Football Association received broad media coverage. Bringing race into a retaliatory insult – even if it did not meet the criminal-law definition of racial abuse – had repercussions in football. Following the FA's reprimand, Terry lost the England captaincy and subsequently retired from the national team. England manager Fabio Capello resigned during the controversy.

== Background ==
On 2 November 2011, Terry was placed under police investigation following an allegation of racist abuse made at Anton Ferdinand during a match versus Queens Park Rangers. Video footage circulated on the internet led to accusations that Terry called Ferdinand a "fucking black cunt." In response to the video footage, Terry claimed that he was actually asking Ferdinand, "Oi, Anton, do you think I called you a black cunt?" On 25 November 2011, Terry was interviewed under caution by the police. On 21 December 2011, he was charged with using racist language by the Crown Prosecution Service. On 3 February 2012, the Football Association (FA) stripped Terry of his England captaincy for the second time, stating that Terry would not captain the national team until the racial abuse allegations against him were resolved.

== Criminal proceedings ==
When the trial began in July 2012, Terry entered a not guilty plea and was acquitted of the charge on 13 July 2012. The court established that neither Ferdinand nor anyone else had heard Terry's words, but Terry himself admitted that he had directed the words "fucking black cunt" and "fucking knobhead" at Ferdinand, which was affirmed by two expert lip readers from video evidence. Terry maintained that he used the words as a form of sarcasm and that he was questioning what he thought had been an allegation of racism from Ferdinand; neither lip reader was able to "identify whether the statement was made as a question or in what type of voice it was said." Chief Magistrate Howard Riddle concluded that while there was no doubt Terry had uttered those words in anger, "it is impossible to be sure exactly what were the words spoken by [Terry] at the relevant time" and that there was a lack of evidence to prove beyond a doubt that Terry had used them as an insult instead of "a challenge to what he believed had been said to him." The court therefore found Terry not guilty.

== FA charges ==
On 27 July 2012, the FA charged Terry for using "abusive and/or insulting words and/or behaviour" which "included a reference to the ethnic origin and/or colour and/or race of Ferdinand." The FA had delayed the charge until after the conclusion of Terry's criminal trial. Terry denied the charge. On the eve of the FA's hearing, Terry announced his retirement from the England national football team, saying his position had become "untenable" due to the disciplinary charge. On 27 September 2012, the hearing concluded with Terry being found guilty; he was punished with a four-match ban and a £220,000 fine.

The FA published a 63-page report regarding the disciplinary proceedings conducted by an Independent Regulatory Commission; it labelled aspects of Terry's defence as "improbable, implausible and contrived," finding it "inherently unlikely that if he had been accused by Mr. Ferdinand of calling him something that ended with the words "black cunt", that Mr. Terry would have added the word "fucking" when he threw the words back, if he was genuinely doing so by way of forceful denial" and "inherently improbable" that he would call Anton Ferdinand a "fucking knobhead" for falsely accusing him of racial abuse. The Commission found it "implausible" that to robustly deny having used the words "black cunt" he "simply repeated" them. His defence in court was not that he had "simply repeated" the words but that he had "sarcastically" repeated them (see above); however, there was no reference to sarcasm in the Regulatory Commission's 63-page written report. The Commission concluded that it was "quite satisfied, on the balance of probabilities, that there [was] no credible basis for Mr. Terry's defence that his use of the words 'fucking black cunt' were directed at Ferdinand by way of forceful rejection and/or inquiry. Instead, [the Commission was] quite satisfied, and [found] on the balance of probabilities, that the offending words were said by way of insult."

The FA commission was also criticised as a "kangaroo court" and the FA for its lack of independence, for failing to disclose all evidence to the police, failing to tape record their interview with key witness Ashley Cole, for lowering the required burden of proof after the incident had taken place, and for punishing Terry for an offence he had already been cleared of in a criminal court, in contravention of its own rules, which state that verdicts in criminal cases are "presumed to be correct" unless "clear and convincing evidence" to the contrary emerges. Terry's four-match ban was contrasted with Luis Suárez's eight-match ban for racially abusing Patrice Evra (Suárez received a longer ban for using the insults repeatedly) and a 14-year-old schoolboy's five-match ban for telling a referee his name was Santa Claus.

On 18 October 2012, Terry decided not to appeal against the verdict and his four-match ban. He issued an apology for "the language [he] used in the game" and stated that it was "not acceptable on the football field or indeed in any walk of life." Chelsea announced that they had taken further disciplinary action against Terry while keeping the details confidential. However, Terry and Chelsea still faced media condemnation; Terry was criticised for not directly and personally apologising to Ferdinand, while Chelsea were accused of hypocrisy and double standards by only fining Terry and not stripping him of his captaincy when they have a "zero-tolerance" approach to racism and had previously handed a life ban to a fan who racially abused former Chelsea player Didier Drogba. In a radio interview, Chelsea chairman Bruce Buck and chief executive Ron Gourlay called the incident a "lapse of judgement" and "out of character" from Terry and stated that the club had "taken firm disciplinary action appropriate to the circumstances," adding that "we must not forget he was cleared in a court of law."

In The Daily Telegraph, Paul Hayward summed up his view of the consequences of the controversial incident, that "the cost has been high. Here, three vile words muttered by Terry at Loftus Road ultimately removed Fabio Capello from the England manager's job; inflicted much distress on the Ferdinand family; brought a £45,000 fine for Rio Ferdinand for his endorsement of a "choc ice" tweet aimed at Chelsea's left-back; removed Terry from the England reckoning and shed yet more light on the fantasy world of Ashley Cole." In HuffPost, Michael Volpe said "it seemed plainly obvious what the situation was and that his (John Terry's) version of the events rang true".

== See also ==
- John Terry (previously 'LNS') v Persons Unknown, a separate legal action also involving John Terry
