= The 3AM Girls =

Title of the gossip columnists for the Daily Mirror

The 3AM Girls was the collective title of the gossip columnists for the Daily Mirror, a British tabloid newspaper.

== Background ==
The group rose to prominence during Piers Morgan's time as editor of the paper and was created by Morgan with Richard Wallace in response to the "ladette" culture of the 1990s.

The column is now called 3am and was later edited by Clemmie Moodie with Ashleigh Rainbird. In 2009, the website 3am.co.uk appeared, edited by Dominic Mohan's sister Isabel. Their tabloid counterparts are The Goss Girls for the Daily Star and Dan Wootton who edits The Sun's Bizarre column.

In May 2016, the daily 3am column was published for the last time.

== Rivalry with Chris Moyles ==
In September 2004, BBC Radio 1 DJ Chris Moyles highlighted the made-up news stories and quotes on his then-afternoon music and chat show. The following day Moyles's mobile phone number was printed in the paper as a retaliation. Moyles called for the 3AM girls to resign, and several thousand of Moyles's listeners rang in to the Daily Mirror to complain. The Mirror asked Moyles to call off his listeners, which he did, claiming he had won the battle by doing this.

== Fictitious quotations ==
In 2007 Private Eye reported former 3AM girl Jessica Callan as saying that quotes for interviewees were made up by journalists: "The conversations celebrities had with us often bore no relation to the words which were printed in the column. On the odd occasion I didn't even know the quotes had been rewritten until I read the paper the following day... There was re-jigging and there was making up entire chats. Amazingly, we were never sued for having imaginary conversations".
