= 1986 Rous Cup =

| England | Scotland |
| (England) | (Scotland) |
| 2 | 1 |
- Date: 23 April 1986
- Venue: Wembley Stadium, London
- Referee: Michel Vautrot (France)
- Attendance: 68,357

The 1986 Rous Cup was the second staging of the Rous Cup annual international football match between two rivals: England and Scotland.

Scotland unsuccessfully defended its 1985 Cup losing on 23 April 1986 at Wembley Stadium, London the Cup to England, 2–1. This was the last game that the two nations alone would contest for the cup. From 1987 onward, a third team would be invited to participate.

== Match details ==
23 April 1986
19:45 BST

| England | 2–1 | Scotland |
|---|---|---|
| Butcher 27'; Hoddle 39' | Report (Page 26) | Souness 57' (pen.) |

Wembley Stadium, London
Attendance: 68,357
Referee: Michel Vautrot (France)

England
Scotland

| GK | 1 | Peter Shilton (Southampton) |
| DF | 2 | Gary Stevens (Everton) |
| DF | 3 | Kenny Sansom (Arsenal) |
| MF | 4 | Glenn Hoddle (Tottenham Hotspur) |
| DF | 5 | Dave Watson (Norwich City) | Booked |
| DF | 6 | Terry Butcher (Ipswich Town) |
| MF | 7 | Steve Hodge (Aston Villa) | | (substituted off) 75' |
| FW | 8 | Trevor Francis (Sampdoria) |
| FW | 9 | Mark Hateley (Milan) |
| MF | 10 | Ray Wilkins (Milan) (c) | | (substituted off) 46' |
| FW | 11 | Chris Waddle (Tottenham Hotspur) |
Substitutes:
| GK | | Chris Woods (Norwich City) |
| MF | | Peter Reid (Everton) | | (substituted on) 46' |
| DF | | Gary Stevens (Tottenham Hotspur) | | (substituted on) 75' |
| MF | | Trevor Steven (Everton) |
| CF | | Kerry Dixon (Chelsea) |
Manager:
(England) Bobby Robson

| GK | 1 | Alan Rough (Hibernian) |
| DF | 2 | Richard Gough (Dundee United) |
| DF | 3 | Maurice Malpas (Dundee United) |
| MF | 4 | Graeme Souness (Sampdoria) (c) |
| DF | 5 | Alex McLeish (Aberdeen) |
| DF | 6 | Willie Miller (Aberdeen) |
| MF | 7 | Steve Nicol (Liverpool) |
| FW | 8 | David Speedie (Chelsea) |
| FW | 9 | Charlie Nicholas (Arsenal) | Booked | (substituted off) 58' |
| MF | 10 | Roy Aitken (Celtic) |
| MF | 11 | Eamonn Bannon (Dundee United) |
Substitutes:
| GK | | Andy Goram (Oldham Athletic) |
| DF | | David Narey (Dundee United) |
| DF | | Arthur Albiston (Manchester United) |
| MF | | Paul McStay (Celtic) |
| MF | | Pat Nevin (Chelsea) | | (substituted on) 58' |
| MF | | Jim Bett (Aberdeen) |
Manager:
(Scotland) Alex Ferguson

Match rules:

- 90 minutes
- Penalty shoot-out if scores still level
- Five substitutes named, of which two may be used
