= Golden Generation (English football) =

Players of the England national football team

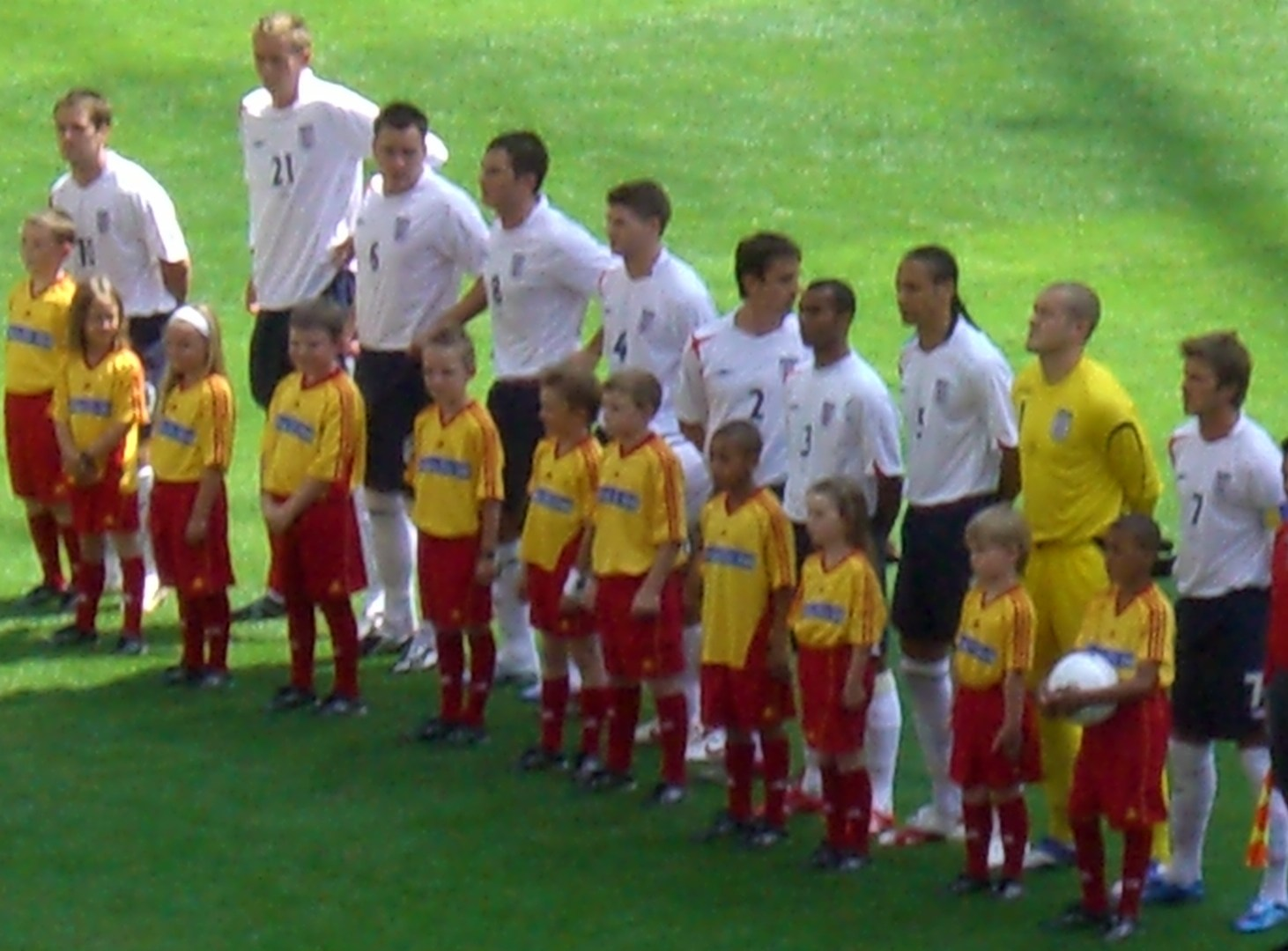
England at the 2006 FIFA World Cup. From left to right: Michael Owen, Peter Crouch, John Terry, Frank Lampard, Steven Gerrard, Gary Neville, Ashley Cole, Rio Ferdinand, Paul Robinson and David Beckham.

The players of the England national football team in the 2000s have been referred to as a golden generation. Despite the talent of its players and their success at club level, the Golden Generation has been known as underachievers, being eliminated at the quarter-finals in three major tournaments and failing to qualify for UEFA Euro 2008.

The term "Golden Generation" was coined in 2001 by The Football Association chief executive Adam Crozier, and criticised as a burden by players such as Frank Lampard. Reasons offered by pundits and players for the failure of the team have included arrogance, tactical inflexibility, the incapability of Lampard and Steven Gerrard to perform together in midfield, and the lack of an assertive manager.

== History ==
On 1 September 2001, England won 5–1 away to Germany in a 2002 FIFA World Cup qualifier. The unexpected victory eventually saw England qualify automatically at the expense of the Germans, though England were eliminated in the quarter-finals and Germany reached the final, both losing to Brazil. Following the game, the Football Association chief executive Adam Crozier referred to the team as a golden generation, and the game has been referred to as the start of the generation.

England were eliminated from the 2006 FIFA World Cup by Portugal, in what Reuters referred to as a clash between two golden generations. After the elimination, The Guardian columnist Paul Wilson blamed the defeat on what he perceived to be arrogance from the players. Manager Sven-Göran Eriksson blamed the players' poor performance rather than the Portuguese quality, which Wilson also considered arrogant.

England failed to qualify for UEFA Euro 2008, a first qualification failure since the 1994 FIFA World Cup. Upon sacking manager Steve McClaren, Football Association board member Brian Mawhinney said "I've been brought up over the last few years believing that this was the golden generation, but I have to tell you, if this is the golden generation, the sooner we move away from the gold standard the better". BBC Sport writer Phil McNulty wrote that McClaren had been Eriksson's assistant and was therefore unfit to revitalise the team.

With many of the same players as in 2006, England entered the 2010 FIFA World Cup with media optimism that the Golden Generation would succeed. Richard Williams of The Guardian called the last-16 elimination by Germany the "passing" of the Golden Generation that he believed had been born at the 1998 FIFA World Cup; many key players were retired from international football or past the age of 30. He contrasted the perceived "entitlement" of the players to the team that had won the 1966 FIFA World Cup.

== Retrospective views ==
Emile Heskey, a veteran of the 2002 World Cup, reflected in 2020 that the "Golden Generation" tag was inaccurate at the time due to the better players of reigning champions France and eventual winners Brazil. Heskey also said there were cliques in the team, that he socialised with his Liverpool teammates and not players from other clubs. Frank Lampard said in 2009 that the "Golden Generation" tag was a burden placed on the players by Crozier.

Michael Owen said in 2021 that tactics were the downfall of the team: he said that the team should have played a 3–5–2 and not 4–4–2 formation due to a strength in central defence and central midfield. Lampard and Steven Gerrard were criticised as central midfield partners. Eriksson played Paul Scholes out of position on the left wing in order to accommodate the pair, and Scholes retired from the team after UEFA Euro 2004, aged 29; journalist Henry Winter identified the misuse of Scholes as a reason for the team's failure. The team was known for a wealth of central defenders including John Terry, Rio Ferdinand, Sol Campbell, Jamie Carragher, Ledley King and Jonathan Woodgate. Gerrard said in 2020 that the team failed because managers were incapable of getting the best out of the team, offering Rafael Benítez as a hypothetical alternative.

The England team of manager Gareth Southgate, which reached the semi-finals of the 2018 FIFA World Cup and the final of UEFA Euro 2020 has been contrasted positively with the 2000s team. Eriksson referred to Southgate's team as a "second Golden Generation". In the 2020s, the 2000s Golden Generation such as Rooney and Gerrard have been criticised as performing poorly in their subsequent managerial careers.
