= Alejandro Lanari =

Argentine footballer

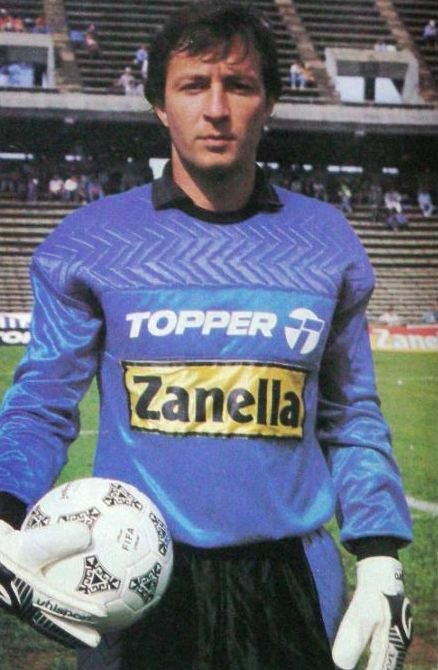
- Lanari in 1986

Personal information
- Full name: Alejandro Fabio Lanari
- Date of birth: 2 May 1960 (age 66)
- Place of birth: Buenos Aires, Argentina
- Position: Goalkeeper

Senior career*
Years	Team	Apps	(Gls)
1980–1986	Sportivo Italiano	212	(0)
1986–1991	Rosario Central	168	(0)
1991–1994	UANL Tigres	72	(0)
1995	Racing Club	2	(0)
1995–1997	Argentinos Juniors	60	(0)
1997–1998	Boca Juniors	0	(0)

International career
1991	Argentina	1	(0)
- * Club domestic league appearances and goals as of May 2007

Alejandro Fabio Lanari (born 2 May 1960) is an Argentine former professional football goalkeeper. He played for several clubs in Argentina and for UANL Tigres in Mexico.

Lanari started his career in 1980 with second-division outfit Sportivo Italiano, where he stayed until 1986, making over 200 appearances for the club. Subsequently, he joined Rosario Central. Lanari helped Central win the Primera Division in the 1986–87 season.

In 1991. he moved to Mexico to play for Tigres, but returned in 1995 for a brief spell with Racing Club before moving to Argentinos Juniors. Argentinos were relegated in 1996 and Lanari played for them in the 2nd division for a season before he was signed as a reserve goalkeeper for Boca Juniors, where he retired in 1998 at the age of 38.

Lanari was part of the Argentina squad that won the 1991 Copa América.

== Honours ==
=== Club ===
Rosario Central

- Primera Division Argentina: 1986–87

=== International ===
Argentina

- Copa América: 1991
