= 1941 Venezuelan Primera División season =

Venezuelan Primera División
- Season: 1941
- Champions: Litoral (1st title)

The 1941 season of the Venezuelan Primera División, the top category of Venezuelan football, was played by 6 teams. The national champions were Litoral.

== Results ==
=== Standings ===
Pos	Team	Pld	W	D	L	GF	GA	GD	Pts
1	Litoral	0	0	0	0	0	0	0	0
2	Dos Caminos	0	0	0	0	0	0	0	0
3	Unión	0	0	0	0	0	0	0	0
4	Venezuela	0	0	0	0	0	0	0	0
5	Loyola	0	0	0	0	0	0	0	0
6	Español	0	0	0	0	0	0	0	0
