= 1940 Venezuelan Primera División season =

Venezuelan Primera División
- Season: 1940
- Champions: Unión (5th title)

The 1940 season of the Venezuelan Primera División, the top category of Venezuelan football, was played by 6 teams. The national champions were Unión.

== Results ==
=== Standings ===
Pos	Team	Pld	W	D	L	GF	GA	GD	Pts
1	Unión	15	11	2	2	46	13	+33	24
2	Dos Caminos	15	10	3	2	39	15	+24	23
3	Litoral	15	3	9	3	29	29	0	15
4	Venezuela	15	6	2	7	19	34	−15	14
5	Loyola	15	3	3	9	21	35	−14	9
6	Español	15	1	3	11	18	46	−28	5
