= 1932 Venezuelan Primera División season =

Venezuelan Primera División
- Season: 1932
- Champions: Unión (1st title)

The 1932 season of the Venezuelan Primera División, the top category of Venezuelan football, was played by 9 teams. The national champions were Unión.

== Results ==
=== Standings ===
| Pos | Team | Pld | W | D | L | GF | GA | GD | Pts |
|---|---|---|---|---|---|---|---|---|---|
| 1 | Unión | 0 | 0 | 0 | 0 | 0 | 0 | 0 | 0 |
| 2 | Dos Caminos | 0 | 0 | 0 | 0 | 0 | 0 | 0 | 0 |
| 3 | Venezuela | 0 | 0 | 0 | 0 | 0 | 0 | 0 | 0 |
| 4 | Loyola | 0 | 0 | 0 | 0 | 0 | 0 | 0 | 0 |
| 5 | Español | 0 | 0 | 0 | 0 | 0 | 0 | 0 | 0 |
| 6 | Centro Atlético | 0 | 0 | 0 | 0 | 0 | 0 | 0 | 0 |
| 7 | Alemania | 0 | 0 | 0 | 0 | 0 | 0 | 0 | 0 |
| 8 | Nueva Esparta | 0 | 0 | 0 | 0 | 0 | 0 | 0 | 0 |
| 9 | Aspirante | 0 | 0 | 0 | 0 | 0 | 0 | 0 | 0 |
