= 1965 Venezuelan Primera División season =

Venezuelan Primera División
- Season: 1965
- Champions: Lara (1st title)

The 1965 season of the Venezuelan Primera División, the top category of Venezuelan football, was played by 8 teams. The national champions were Lara.

== Results ==
=== Standings ===
Pos	Team	Pld	W	D	L	GF	GA	GD	Pts
1	Lara	28	12	11	5	48	31	+17	35
2	Deportivo Italia	28	11	12	5	42	33	+9	34
3	Tiquire Flores	28	13	7	8	43	40	+3	33
4	Unión Deportiva Canarias	28	12	8	8	38	33	+5	32
5	Valencia	28	11	6	11	45	43	+2	28
6	Deportivo Galicia	28	9	5	14	42	48	−6	23
7	Deportivo Portugués	28	9	3	16	44	55	−11	21
8	La Salle	28	7	4	17	35	54	−19	18
