= Orlando Fantoni =

Brazilian footballer (1917–2002)

Personal information
- Date of birth: 13 May 1917
- Place of birth: Belo Horizonte, Brazil
- Date of death: 5 June 2002 (aged 85)
- Place of death: Salvador, Brazil
- Position: Forward

Senior career*
Years	Team	Apps	(Gls)
1932–1942	Palestra Itália-MG	53	(62)
1943–1945	Siderúrgica		
1946–1947	Cruzeiro		
1948	Lazio	8	(2)
1948–1949	Vasco da Gama		
1949	Cruzeiro	1	(0)
1949–1950	Vasco da Gama		

Managerial career
- 1955–1959: Venezuela
- 1957: UCV
- 1958: Deportivo Portugués
- 1961–1967: Deportivo Italia
- 1967–1968: Cruzeiro
- 1970: América Mineiro
- 1971–1972: Cruzeiro
- 1973: América Mineiro
- 1974–1975: Náutico
- 1976–1977: Bahia
- 1977–1978: Vasco da Gama
- 1979: Grêmio
- 1980: Corinthians
- 1980: Vasco da Gama
- 1981: Sport Recife
- 1982: Náutico
- 1983: Cruzeiro
- 1984: Botafogo
- 1986–1987: Bahia
- 1988–1989: Vitória
- * Club domestic league appearances and goals

Orlando Fantoni (13 May 1917 – 5 June 2002), also known as Fantoni IV, was a Brazilian professional footballer and manager, who played as a forward.

== Playing career ==
The youngest of the Fantoni brothers, Orlando followed in the footsteps of Ninão and Niginho by playing for Palestra Itália (currently Cruzeiro) from 1932 to 1942. He also played two seasons for Siderúrgica de Sabará and in 1948 he transferred to Lazio, being the fourth Fantoni to represent for the club . He would still play for Vasco da Gama, where he was champion in 1949 and 1950.

== Managerial career ==
Soon after retiring from the field, he accepted the task of helping in the development of football in Venezuela, taking over the command of the national team and some clubs such as UCV, Deportivo Portugués and Deportivo Itália, being national champion for all of these. As a coach he had a very successful career, being the first Brazilian to win five state championships with different teams, in addition to winning titles again with Cruzeiro and Vasco, where he had been champion as a player. Fantoni also did great work for América and Corinthians, even without winning titles, in addition to being EC Bahia champion in three editions of the state championship.

== Personal life and death ==
Orlando is brother os also footballers Niginho (Leonídio Fantoni) and Ninão (João Fantoni), cousin of Nininho Fantoni, and uncle of Benito Fantoni and Fernando Fantoni.

Fantoni died on 5 June 2002, at the age of 85 in Salvador, due to lung emphysema.

== Honours ==
=== Player ===
Cruzeiro

- Campeonato Mineiro: 1940

Vasco da Gama

- Campeonato Carioca: 1949, 1950

=== Manager ===
UCV

- Venezuelan Primera División: 1957

Deportivo Portugués

- Venezuelan Primera División: 1958

Deportivo Itália

- Venezuelan Primera División: 1961, 1963, 1966

Cruzeiro

- Campeonato Mineiro: 1968
- Taça Minas Gerais: 1983

Náutico

- Campeonato Pernambucano: 1974

Bahia

- Campeonato Baiano: 1976, 1986, 1987

Vasco da Gama

- Campeonato Carioca: 1977
- Taça Guanabara: 1977

Grêmio

- Campeonato Gaúcho: 1979
