= 1954 Venezuelan Primera División season =

Venezuelan Primera División
- Season: 1954
- Champions: Deportivo Vasco (1st title)

The 1954 season of the Venezuelan Primera División, the top category of Venezuelan football, was played by 6 teams. The national champions were Deportivo Vasco.

== Results ==
=== Standings ===
Pos	Team	Pld	W	D	L	GF	GA	GD	Pts
1	Deportivo Vasco	0	0	0	0	0	0	0	0
2	Loyola	0	0	0	0	0	0	0	0
3	La Salle	0	0	0	0	0	0	0	0
4	Deportivo Español	0	0	0	0	0	0	0	0
5	Dos Caminos	0	0	0	0	0	0	0	0
6	Universidad Central	0	0	0	0	0	0	0	0
