= Football at the 1946 Central American and Caribbean Games – Men's team squads =

The following is a list of squads for each nation competing in football at the 1946 Central American and Caribbean Games in Barranquilla.

== Colombia ==
Head coach: (Peru) José Arana Cruz

No.	Pos.	Player	Date of birth (age)	Caps	Goals	Club
—	GK	Julio Gaviria		0	0	(Colombian Football Federation) Santa Fe
—	GK	Dagoberto Ojeda		0	0	(Colombian Football Federation) Junior
—	DF	Víctor Brand		0	0	
—	DF	Teófilo Marriaga		0	0	(Colombian Football Federation) Junior
—	DF	Gabriel Mejía		6	0	(Colombian Football Federation) Junior
—	DF	Humberto Picalúa		1	0	(Colombian Football Federation) Junior
—	DF	Luis Eladio Vásquez		0	0	
—	MF	Luz Gastelbondo		0	0	(Colombian Football Federation) Junior
—	MF	Casimiro Guerra		0	0	(Colombian Football Federation) Junior
—	MF	Edgar Mallarino	25 January 1924 (aged 22)	0	0	(Colombian Football Federation) América
—	MF	Juan A. Quintero		6	0	(Colombian Football Federation) Junior
—	MF	José Santamaría		0	0	
—	FW	Carlos Arango	31 January 1928 (aged 18)	0	0	
—	FW	Rubén Arango		0	0	
—	FW	Fulgencio Berdugo	14 June 1918 (aged 28)	6	2	(Colombian Football Federation) Junior
—	FW	Jaime Cardona		0	0	
—	FW	Octavio Carrillo		0	0	(Colombian Football Federation) Junior
—	FW	Faustino Castillo		0	0	
—	FW	Rigoberto García		0	0	(Colombian Football Federation) Junior
—	FW	Dimas Gómez		0	0	
—	FW	Luis González Rubio		6	2	(Colombian Football Federation) Junior
—	FW	Rafael Granados		4	0	(Colombian Football Federation) Junior
—	FW	Octavio Ruiz		0	0	(Colombian Football Federation) Junior

== Costa Rica ==
Head coach: (Costa Rica) Hernán Bolaños

No.	Pos.	Player	Date of birth (age)	Caps	Goals	Club
—	GK	Carlos Alvarado	19 December 1927 (aged 18)	0	0	(Costa Rican Football Federation) Alajuelense
—	DF	León Alvarado		0	0	
—	DF	Mario Masís		0	0	
—	DF	Édgar Silva		0	0	
—	MF	Víctor Bustos		0	0	
—	MF	Eduardo Cabalceta		4	0	
—	MF	Édgar Esquivel		0	0	
—	MF	José Luis Rojas	4 April 1920 (aged 26)	0	0	(Costa Rican Football Federation) Alajuelense
—	MF	Mario Ruiz		3	0	
—	FW	Jesús María Araya		11	4	
—	FW	Gonzalo Fernández		0	0	
—	FW	Oscar Mórux		0	0	
—	FW	José Retana		0	0	
—	FW	Walker Rodríguez		8	6	
—	FW	Salvador Soto	4 November 1909 (aged 37)	10	7	(Costa Rican Football Federation) Alajuelense
—	FW	Manuel Vargas		0	0	
—	FW	Miguel Ángel Zeledón		2	3	

== Curaçao ==
Head coach:

No.	Pos.	Player	Date of birth (age)	Caps	Goals	Club
—	GK	Ergilio Hato	7 November 1926 (aged 20)	3	0	(Curaçao national football team (1921–1958)) CRKSV Jong Holland
—	GK	Ezequiel Vos		3	0	(Curaçao national football team (1921–1958)) C.V.V. Inter Willemstad
—	DF	Edmundo Confesor		12	0	(Curaçao national football team (1921–1958)) SUBT
—	DF	Pedro Matrona	9 December 1927 (aged 19)	0	0	(Curaçao national football team (1921–1958)) CRKSV Jong Holland
—	DF	Emile Orman		0	0	(Curaçao national football team (1921–1958)) CRKSV Jong Holland
—	MF	Guillermo Giribaldi	17 May 1929 (aged 17)	3	1	(Curaçao national football team (1921–1958)) RKV FC Sithoc
—	MF	Chal Haseth		0	0	(Curaçao national football team (1921–1958)) CRKSV Jong Holland
—	MF	Mario Jansen		4	2	
—	MF	Ailan Julia		0	0	(Curaçao national football team (1921–1958)) C.V.V. Inter Willemstad
—	MF	Wilfred Korps		3	0	
—	MF	Looi Mercera		7	0	
—	MF	Eddy Vlinder	6 February 1926 (aged 20)	0	0	(Curaçao national football team (1921–1958)) SUBT
—	FW	Eligius Berkenveld		0	0	(Curaçao national football team (1921–1958)) RKV FC Sithoc
—	FW	Reinaldo Bernabela		13	3	(Curaçao national football team (1921–1958)) SUBT
—	FW	Pedro Coffie		0	0	(Curaçao national football team (1921–1958)) RKV FC Sithoc
—	FW	Federico Jansen		11	15	(Curaçao national football team (1921–1958)) CRKSV Jong Holland
—	FW	Maximiliano Juliana		5	3	(Curaçao national football team (1921–1958)) CRKSV Jong Holland
—	FW	Frans Kelkboom		0	0	(Curaçao national football team (1921–1958)) CRKSV Jong Holland
—	FW	José Mathilde		0	0	
—		Pedro Baseano		0	0	
—		Reinier Calmes		0	0	
—		Guillermo Mercelina		0	0	
—		Augusto Rufino		0	0	
—		Charles Rufino		0	0	
—		Mario Sevilio		0	0	

== Guatemala ==
Head coach: (Guatemala) Juan Francisco Aguirre, (Guatemala) Manuel Felipe Carrera

No.	Pos.	Player	Date of birth (age)	Caps	Goals	Club
—	GK	Plutarco Morales		0	0	
—	DF	Julio Díaz		0	0	
—	DF	Federico Morales		0	0	
—	MF	Guillermo Marroquín		0	0	
—	MF	Carlos Molina		1	0	
—	MF	Augusto Sandoval		0	0	
—	FW	Mario Camposeco	6 August 1921 (aged 25)	4	2	(National Football Federation of Guatemala) Xelajú
—	FW	Armando Durán		2	2	
—	FW	Esteban González		4	1	
—	FW	Mario Melgar		0	0	
—	FW	Carlos Toledo	10 August 1919 (aged 27)	6	9	(National Football Federation of Guatemala) Municipal

== Panama ==
Head coach: (Chile) Óscar Rendoll Gómez

No.	Pos.	Player	Date of birth (age)	Caps	Goals	Club
—	GK	Gerardo Warren		0	0	
—	DF	Braulio Arosemena		0	0	
—	DF	Gastón de León		0	0	
—	DF	Manuel Figueroa		1	0	
—	DF	Alfredo Sandiford		0	0	
—	DF	Félix Tejada		6	0	
—	MF	Reinaldo Carrillo		1	0	
—	MF	Virgilio Castro		4	2	
—	MF	Antonio Latiff		0	0	
—	MF	Carlos Alberto Martínez		2	0	
—	FW	James Santiago Anderson		9	5	
—	FW	Juan Antonio Ferreira		1	1	
—	FW	Antonio Morales		2	0	
—	FW	Antoine Neville		4	1	
—	FW	Pablo Prado		8	1	
—	FW	Luis Carlos Rangel		5	0	
—		Jorge de la Guardia		0	0	
—		Miguel Fernández		0	0	
—		James Lynch		0	0	
—		Roberto Pinock		0	0	
—		Luis Valdés		1	0	
—		Marcial Valencia		0	0	

== Puerto Rico ==
Head coach:

No.	Pos.	Player	Date of birth (age)	Caps	Goals	Club
—	GK	Brall				
—	DF	Etrigo				
—	DF	Valdo				
—	MF	Lebron				
—	MF	Prineiro				
—	MF	Viejo				
—	FW	Alberón				
—	FW	Martínez				
—	FW	Mendo				
—	FW	Pinero				
—	FW	Portale				

== Venezuela ==
Head coach: (Peru) Sixto Soler

No.	Pos.	Player	Date of birth (age)	Caps	Goals	Club
—	GK	Miguel Sanabria		0	0	(Venezuelan Football Federation) Unión SC
—	DF	Ernesto Blanco		3	0	(Venezuelan Football Federation) Universidad Central de Venezuela FC
—	MF	José María Ardila		8	0	(Venezuelan Football Federation) Universidad
—	MF	Nicasio Camero		8	0	
—	MF	Hernán Mújica		4	1	(Venezuelan Football Federation) Dos Caminos
—	FW	Víctor García		0	0	(Venezuelan Football Federation) Independiente
—	FW	Rafael González		0	0	(Venezuelan Football Federation) Unión SC
—	FW	Manuel Leopoldo Pérez		3	0	(Venezuelan Football Federation) Deportivo Vasco
—	FW	Carlos Rodríguez		0	0	
—	FW	Nerio Seijas		1	0	(Venezuelan Football Federation) Unión SC
—	FW	Andrés Sucre		0	0	
—	FW	Pedro Terán		1	0	
—		Rosendo Aparicio		0	0	(Venezuelan Football Federation) Independiente
—		Luis Jiménez		0	0	
—		Germán Martínez		0	0	(Venezuelan Football Federation) Independiente
—		Asdrúbal Olivares		0	0	(Venezuelan Football Federation) La Salle
—		David Zamudio		0	0	(Venezuelan Football Federation) Unión SC
