= 1956 Venezuelan Primera División season =

Venezuelan Primera División
- Season: 1956
- Champions: Banco Obrero (1st title)

The 1956 season of the Venezuelan Primera División, the top category of Venezuelan football, was played by 5 teams. The national champions were Banco Obrero.

== Results ==
=== Standings ===
Pos	Team	Pld	W	D	L	GF	GA	GD	Pts
1	Banco Obrero	12	8	3	1	23	8	+15	19
2	La Salle	12	8	2	2	31	8	+23	18
3	Vasco	12	5	1	6	12	15	−3	11
4	Dos Caminos	12	3	1	8	11	24	−13	7
5	Deportivo Español	12	2	1	9	10	32	−22	5
