= 1955 Venezuelan Primera División season =

Venezuelan Primera División
- Season: 1955
- Champions: La Salle (2nd title)

The 1955 season of the Venezuelan Primera División, the top category of Venezuelan football, was played by 5 teams. The national champions were La Salle.

== Results ==
=== Standings ===
Pos	Team	Pld	W	D	L	GF	GA	GD	Pts
1	La Salle	12	8	2	2	26	5	+21	18
2	Deportivo Español	11	5	3	3	16	17	−1	13
3	Dos Caminos	11	4	2	5	17	22	−5	10
4	Vasco	11	3	2	6	11	18	−7	8
5	Loyola	11	3	1	7	18	26	−8	7
