= 1962 Venezuelan Primera División season =

Venezuelan Primera División
- Season: 1962
- Champions: Deportivo Portugués (3rd title)

The 1962 season of the Venezuelan Primera División, the top category of Venezuelan football, was played by 6 teams. The national champions were Deportivo Portugués.

== Results ==
=== Standings ===
| Pos | Team | Pld | W | D | L | GF | GA | GD | Pts |
|---|---|---|---|---|---|---|---|---|---|
| 1 | Deportivo Portugués | 17 | 11 | 4 | 2 | 43 | 11 | +32 | 26 |
| 2 | Universidad Central | 17 | 11 | 4 | 2 | 42 | 15 | +27 | 26 |
| 3 | Dos Caminos | 18 | 9 | 2 | 7 | 24 | 32 | −8 | 20 |
| 4 | Banco Francés e Italiano | 18 | 7 | 5 | 6 | 30 | 27 | +3 | 19 |
| 5 | Deportivo Vasco | 18 | 3 | 2 | 13 | 14 | 35 | −21 | 8 |
| 6 | La Salle | 18 | 1 | 5 | 12 | 22 | 55 | −33 | 7 |

=== Championship play-off ===
| Deportivo Portugués | 3 – 0 | Universidad Central |

| Universidad Central | 0 – 3 | Deportivo Portugués |
