= 1967 Venezuelan Primera División season =

Venezuelan Primera División
- Season: 1967
- Champions: Deportivo Portugués (4th title)

The 1967 season of the Venezuelan Primera División, the top category of Venezuelan football, was played by 9 teams. The national champions were Deportivo Portugués.

== Results ==
=== Standings ===
Pos	Team	Pld	W	D	L	GF	GA	GD	Pts
1	Deportivo Portugués	30	19	9	2	67	32	+35	47
2	Deportivo Galicia	30	15	10	5	45	28	+17	40
3	Lara	30	15	5	10	61	41	+20	35
4	Deportivo Italia	30	11	11	8	44	41	+3	33
5	Litoral	30	9	12	9	43	41	+2	30
6	Valencia	30	10	6	14	34	36	−2	26
7	Anzoátegui FC	30	8	7	15	51	62	−11	23
8	Unión Deportivo Canarias	30	6	10	14	27	51	−24	22
9	Aragua	16	0	0	16	11	41	−30	0
