= 1970 Venezuelan Primera División season =

Venezuelan Primera División
- Season: 1970
- Champions: Deportivo Galicia (3rd title)

The 1970 season of the Venezuelan Primera División, the top category of Venezuelan football, was played by 8 teams. The national champions were Deportivo Galicia.

== Results ==
=== First stage ===
Pos	Team	Pld	W	D	L	GF	GA	GD	Pts
1	Deportivo Italia	14	8	4	2	26	10	+16	20
2	Valencia	14	8	3	3	21	11	+10	19
3	Deportivo Galicia	14	7	2	5	21	15	+6	16
4	Unión Deportiva Canarias	14	4	7	3	16	13	+3	15
5	Lara	14	3	5	6	12	20	−8	11
6	Anzoátegui FC	14	5	1	8	22	31	−9	11
7	Deportivo Portugués	14	3	4	7	13	18	−5	10
8	Tiquire Aragua	14	4	2	8	13	26	−13	10

=== Second stage ===
Pos	Team	Pld	W	D	L	GF	GA	GD	Pts
1	Deportivo Galicia	14	11	0	3	28	13	+15	22
2	Deportivo Portugués	14	9	2	3	24	12	+12	20
3	Deportivo Italia	14	7	3	4	17	14	+3	17
4	Valencia	14	5	4	5	15	12	+3	14
5	Lara	14	5	4	5	14	18	−4	14
6	Anzoátegui FC	14	4	3	7	18	17	+1	11
7	Unión Deportiva Canarias	14	3	3	8	12	26	−14	9
8	Tiquire Aragua	14	0	5	9	13	29	−16	5

=== Championship playoff ===
December 18, 1970

Deportivo Italia	0–0	Deportivo Galicia

December 20, 1970

Deportivo Galicia	1–0	Deportivo Italia
