= 1968 Venezuelan Primera División season =

Venezuelan Primera División
- Season: 1968
- Champions: Unión Deportiva Canarias (1st title)

The 1968 season of the Venezuelan Primera División, the top category of Venezuelan football, was played by 6 teams. The national champions were Unión Deportiva Canarias.

== Results ==
=== First stage ===
Pos	Team	Pld	W	D	L	GF	GA	GD	Pts
1	Unión Deportiva Canarias	18	12	4	2	27	17	+10	28
2	Deportivo Italia	18	7	6	5	45	33	+12	20
3	Deportivo Portugués	18	7	6	5	36	33	+3	20
4	Lara	18	8	4	6	26	29	−3	20
5	Valencia	18	7	5	6	31	21	+10	19
6	Aragua	18	8	3	7	29	33	−4	19
7	Zulia	18	8	2	8	27	22	+5	18
8	Deportivo Galicia	18	7	4	7	32	31	+1	18
9	Anzoátegui FC	18	4	3	11	17	37	−20	11
10	Litoral	18	1	5	12	38	52	−14	7

=== Final Stage ===
Pos	Team	Pld	W	D	L	GF	GA	GD	Pts
1	Unión Deportiva Canarias	10	6	3	1	17	6	+11	15
2	Deportivo Italia	10	5	2	3	16	15	+1	12
3	Deportivo Portugués	10	4	3	3	16	20	−4	11
4	Valencia	10	4	1	5	20	17	+3	9
5	Lara	10	2	4	4	13	12	+1	8
6	Aragua	10	2	1	7	10	22	−12	5
