= 1971 Venezuelan Primera División season =

Venezuelan Primera División
- Season: 1971
- Champions: Valencia (1st title)

The 1971 season of the Venezuelan Primera División, the top category of Venezuelan football, was played by 8 teams. The national champions were Valencia.

== Results ==
=== Standings ===
Pos	Team	Pld	W	D	L	GF	GA	GD	Pts
1	Valencia	28	17	7	4	46	19	+27	41
2	Deportivo Italia	28	14	9	5	46	23	+23	37
3	Tiquire Aragua	28	12	9	7	39	37	+2	33
4	Deportivo Galicia	28	12	7	9	42	34	+8	31
5	Unión Deportiva Canarias	28	9	12	7	37	26	+11	30
6	Anzoátegui FC	28	8	9	11	32	37	−5	25
7	Deportivo Portugués	28	5	6	17	26	46	−20	16
8	Lara	28	5	1	22	25	71	−46	11
