= Liga FUTVE =

Professional association football league in Venezuela

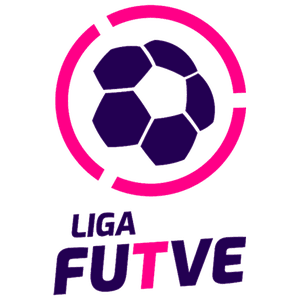
- Founded: 1921; 105 years ago
- Country: Venezuela
- Confederation: CONMEBOL
- Number of clubs: 14
- Level on pyramid: 1
- Relegation to: Liga FUTVE 2
- Domestic cup(s): Copa Venezuela; Supercopa de Venezuela
- International cup(s): Copa Libertadores; Copa Sudamericana
- Current champions: Universidad Central (4th title) (2025 season)
- Most championships: Caracas (12 titles)
- Top scorer: Juan García (271 goals)
- Broadcaster(s): TVes
- Website: Liga FUTVE (in Spanish); Venezuelan Football Federation (in Spanish)
- Current: 2026 season

The Liga FUTVE is the top-flight professional football league of Venezuela. It was created in 1921 and turned professional in 1957. It is organized by the Federación Venezolana de Fútbol (Venezuelan Football League). In 2017, the league rebranded to its current name.

== Format ==
Starting in the 2020 season, 20 teams play in a home-and-away round-robin tournament, with the top eight teams advancing to the semi-final stage.

At the semi-final stage, the eight teams are divided into two groups of four teams each, facing the other teams in their group twice. The two group winners advance to the Serie Final to decide the league champions.

=== International qualification ===
- The champions and runners-up qualify to the group phase of the Copa Libertadores.
- The team with the most points in the entire season qualifies to the preliminary round of the Copa Libertadores as Venezuela 3.
- The second and third team with the most points in the entire season qualifies to the Copa Sudamericana as Venezuela 1 and Venezuela 2.
- If a team won both tournaments that team qualify to the Copa Libertadores as Venezuela 1, then the first and second team with the most points in the entire season qualify to the Copa Libertadores as Venezuela 2 and Venezuela 3 and the fourth and fifth team with the most points in the entire season qualify to the Copa Sudamericana as Venezuela 1 and Venezuela 2.
- If the winner of the Copa Venezuela does not qualify to the Copa Libertadores through the aforementioned manners or through the point total in the entire season, they take the Venezuela 2 spot in the Copa Sudamericana.

=== Relegation ===
- The two lowest placed teams in the entire season are automatically relegated to the Segunda División.

== 2026 teams ==
Locations of the 2025 Primera División teams
Locations of the 2025 Primera División teams – Caracas

Team	City	Stadium	Capacity
Academia Puerto Cabello	Puerto Cabello	Complejo Deportivo Socialista	7,500
Anzoátegui	Puerto La Cruz	José Antonio Anzoátegui	37,485
Carabobo	Valencia	Misael Delgado	10,400
Caracas	Caracas	Olímpico de la UCV	23,940
Deportivo La Guaira	Caracas	Olímpico de la UCV	23,940
Deportivo Táchira	San Cristóbal	Polideportivo de Pueblo Nuevo	38,755
Estudiantes de Mérida	Mérida	Metropolitano de Mérida	42,200
Metropolitanos	Caracas	Olímpico de la UCV	23,940
Monagas	Maturín	Monumental de Maturín	51,796
Portuguesa	Acarigua	General José Antonio Páez	18,000
Rayo Zuliano	Maracaibo	José "Pachencho" Romero	40,800
Trujillanos	Valera	José Alberto Pérez	25,000
Universidad Central	Caracas	Olímpico de la UCV	23,940
Zamora	Barinas	Agustín Tovar	29,800

== List of champions ==
List of champions since the first championship held in 1920. The Primera División turned professional on 21 February 1957.

=== Amateur era ===
- (In bracket, title count):

Ed.	Season	Champion	Runner-up
1	1921	América (1)	Centro Atlético
2	1922	Centro Atlético (1)	América
3	1923	América (2)	Centro Atlético
4	1924	Centro Atlético (2)	Vargas
5	1925	Loyola (1)	Venzóleo
6	1926	Centro Atlético (3)	Venzóleo
7	1927	Venzóleo (1)	Centro Atlético
8	1928	Deportivo Venezuela (1)	Centro Atlético
9	1929	Deportivo Venezuela (2)	Unión
10	1930	Centro Atlético (4)	Unión
11	1931	Deportivo Venezuela (3)	Centro Atlético
12	1932	Unión (1)	Dos Caminos
13	1933	Deportivo Venezuela (4)	Dos Caminos
14	1934	Unión (2)	Dos Caminos
15	1935	Unión (3)	Dos Caminos
16	1936	Dos Caminos (1)	Centro Atlético
17	1937	Dos Caminos (2)	Litoral
18	1938	Dos Caminos (3)	Litoral
19	1939	Unión (4)	Litoral
20	1940	Unión (5)	Dos Caminos
21	1941	Litoral (1)	Dos Caminos
22	1942	Dos Caminos (4)	Loyola
23	1943	Loyola (2)	Litoral
24	1944	Loyola (3)	Dos Caminos
25	1945	Dos Caminos (5)	Loyola
26	1946	Deportivo Español (1)	Centro Atlético
27	1947	Unión (6)	Universidad Central
28	1948	Loyola (4)	Unión
29	1949	Dos Caminos (6)	Universidad Central
30	1950	Unión (7)	La Salle
31	1951	Universidad Central (1)	Loyola
32	1952	La Salle (1)	Loyola
33	1953	Universidad Central (2)	La Salle
34	1954	Deportivo Vasco (1)	Loyola
35	1955	La Salle (2)	Deportivo Español
36	1956	Banco Obrero (1)	La Salle

=== Professional era ===
- (In bracket, title count):

Ed.	Season	Champion	Runner-up	Winning manager	Top scorer
37	1957	Universidad Central (3)	La Salle	(Brazil) Orlando Fantoni	(Brazil) Tonho (Universidad Central, 12 goals)
38	1958	Deportivo Portugués (1)	Deportivo Español	(Brazil) Orlando Fantoni	(Venezuela) René Irazque (Portugués, 6 goals)
39	1959	Deportivo Español (2)	Deportivo Portugués	(Paraguay) Delfín Benítez Cáceres	(Spain) Abel Benítez (Deportivo Español, 15 goals)
40	1960	Deportivo Portugués (2)	Deportivo Español	(Portugal) Javier Ferreira	(Spain) José Luis Iglesias (Deportivo Portugués, 9 goals)
41	1961	Deportivo Italia (1)	Banco Agrícola y Pecuario	(Brazil) Orlando Fantoni	(Venezuela) Antonio Ravelo (Banco Agrícola y Pecuario, 11 goals)
42	1962	Deportivo Portugués (3)	Universidad Central	(Spain) Emilio Huguet	(Brazil) Jaime da Silva (Universidad Central, 16)
43	1963	Deportivo Italia (2)	Deportivo Portugués	(Brazil) Orlando Fantoni	(Brazil) Nino (Deportivo Portugués, 15 goals)
44	1964	Deportivo Galicia (1)	Tiquire Flores	(Uruguay) Julio César Britos	(Brazil) Helio Rodrigues (Tiquire Flores, 12 goals)
45	1965	Lara (1)	Deportivo Italia	(Brazil) Gaetano Pintón	(Argentina) Mario Mateo (Lara, 16 goals)
46	1966	Deportivo Italia (3)	Deportivo Portugués	(Brazil) Orlando Fantoni	(Brazil) Ratto (Deportivo Portugués, 20 goals)
47	1967	Deportivo Portugués (4)	Deportivo Galicia	(Spain) José Julián Hernández	(Brazil) Joao Ramos (Deportivo Portugués, 28 goals)
48	1968	Unión Deportiva Canarias (1)	Deportivo Italia	(Uruguay) Manuel Arias	(Brazil) Raimundinho (Deportivo Portugués, 21 goals)
49	1969	Deportivo Galicia (2)	Valencia	(Uruguay) Julio César Britos	(Brazil) Eustaquio Batista (Deportivo Italia, 19 goals) (Brazil) Lelo (Valencia, 19 goals)
50	1970	Deportivo Galicia (3)	Deportivo Italia	(Brazil) Silvio Leite	(Uruguay) Roland Langon (Deportivo Galicia, 13 goals)
51	1971	Valencia (1)	Deportivo Italia	(Uruguay) Walter Roque	(Brazil) Agostinho Sabara (Tiquire Aragua, 20 goals)
52	1972	Deportivo Italia (4)	Deportivo Galicia	(Brazil) Elmo Correa	(Venezuela) Francisco Rodriguez (Anzoátegui FC, 18 goals)
53	1973	Portuguesa (1)	Valencia	(Uruguay) Walter Roque	(Uruguay) Jose Chiazzaro (Estudiantes de Mérida, 14 goals)
54	1974	Deportivo Galicia (4)	Portuguesa	(Uruguay) Walter Roque	(Uruguay) Jose Chiazzaro (Estudiantes de Mérida, 15 goals) (Uruguay) Sergio Hugo Castillo (Anzoátegui FC, 15 goals)
55	1975	Portuguesa (2)	Estudiantes de Mérida	(Socialist Federal Republic of Yugoslavia) Vladica Popović	(Paraguay) Pedro Pascual Peralta (Portuguesa, 20 goals)
56	1976	Portuguesa (3)	Estudiantes de Mérida	(Paraguay) Benjamín Fernández	(Paraguay) Pedro Pascual Peralta (Portuguesa, 25 goals)
57	1977	Portuguesa (4)	Estudiantes de Mérida	(Socialist Federal Republic of Yugoslavia) Vladica Popović	(Brazil) Jairzinho (Portuguesa, 20 goals) (Brazil) Juan Cesar Silva (Portuguesa, 20 goals)
58	1978	Portuguesa (5)	Deportivo Galicia	(Paraguay) Celino Mora	(Brazil) Andrade (ULA Mérida, 23 goals)
59	1979	Deportivo Táchira (1)	Deportivo Galicia	(Uruguay) Esteban Beracochea	(Uruguay) Omar Ferrari (Deportivo Táchira, 15 goals)
60	1980	Estudiantes de Mérida (1)	Portuguesa	(Paraguay) Ramón Rodríguez	(Brazil) Wilfrido Campos (Portuguesa, 12 goals)
61	1981	Deportivo Táchira (2)	Estudiantes de Mérida	(Uruguay) Esteban Beracochea	(Colombia) Rafael Angulo (Deportivo Táchira, 14 goals)
62	1982	San Cristóbal (1)	Deportivo Táchira	(Uruguay) Walter Roque	(Uruguay) German Montero (Estudiantes, 21 goals)
63	1983	Universidad de Los Andes (1)	Portuguesa	(Venezuela) Iván García	(Venezuela) Johnny Castellanos (Atlético Zamora, 13 goals)
64	1984	Deportivo Táchira (3)	Deportivo Italia	(Argentina) (Venezuela) Carlos Horacio Moreno	(Brazil) Sergio Meckler (Zamora, 15 goals)
65	1985	Estudiantes de Mérida (2)	Deportivo Táchira	(Venezuela) Iván García	(Brazil) Sergio Meckler (Deportivo Táchira, 17 goals)
66	1986	Unión Atlético Táchira (4)	Estudiantes de Mérida	(Argentina) (Venezuela) Carlos Horacio Moreno	(Venezuela) Wilton Arreaza (Caracas, 8 goals)
67	1986–87	Marítimo (1)	Unión Atlético Táchira	(Venezuela) Rafael Santana	(Venezuela) Johnny Castellanos (Portuguesa, 16 goals)
68	1987–88	Marítimo (2)	Unión Atlético Táchira	(Uruguay) Alfredo López	(Argentina) Miguel González (Unión Atlético Táchira, 22 goals)
69	1988–89	Mineros de Guayana (1)	Pepeganga Margarita	(Uruguay) Alfredo López	(Venezuela) Johnny Castellanos (Mineros, 24 goals)
70	1989–90	Marítimo (3)	Unión Atlético Táchira	(Venezuela) Rafael Santana	(Venezuela) Herbert Márquez (Marítimo, 19 goals)
71	1990–91	Universidad de Los Andes (2)	Marítimo	(Argentina) Carlos Diéz	(Venezuela) Alexander Bottini (Monagas, 15 goals)
72	1991–92	Caracas (1)	Minervén	(Venezuela) Manuel Plasencia	(Germany) Andreas Vogler (Caracas, 25 goals)
73	1992–93	Marítimo (4)	Minervén	(Cuba) Miguel Sabina	(Venezuela) Herbert Márquez (Marítimo, 21 goals)
74	1993–94	Caracas (2)	Trujillanos	(Venezuela) Manuel Plasencia	(Colombia) Rodrigo Soto (Trujillanos, 20 goals)
75	1994–95	Caracas (3)	Minervén	(Venezuela) Pedro Febles	(Brazil) Rogeiro da Silva (Mineros, 30 goals)
76	1995–96	Minervén (1)	Mineros de Guayana	(Argentina) Raúl Cavalleri	(Venezuela) Jose Luis Dolgetta (Caracas, 24 goals)
77	1996–97	Caracas (4)	Atlético Zulia	(Venezuela) Manuel Plasencia	(Venezuela) Rafael Castellín (Caracas, 19 goals)
78	1997–98	Atlético Zulia (1)	Estudiantes de Mérida	(Serbia) Ratomir Dujkovic	(Venezuela) Jose Luis Dolgetta (Estudiantes de Mérida/Carabobo, 22 goals)
79	1998–99	Deportivo Italchacao (5)	Unión Atlético Táchira	(Argentina) Raúl Cavalleri	(Colombia) Gustavo Fonseca (Internacional Lara, 24 goals)
80	1999–00	Deportivo Táchira (5)	Deportivo Italchacao	(Uruguay) Walter Roque	(Venezuela) Juan Enrique García (Caracas, 24 goals)
81	2000–01	Caracas (5)	Trujillanos	(Argentina) (Venezuela) Carlos Horacio Moreno	(Argentina) Martín Brignani (Estudiantes de Mérida, 12 goals)
82	2001–02	Nacional Táchira	Estudiantes de Mérida	(Uruguay) (Venezuela) Carlos Maldonado	(Venezuela) Juan Enrique García (Nacional Táchira, 34 goals)
83	2002–03	Caracas (6)	Unión Atlético Maracaibo	(Venezuela) Noel Sanvicente	(Venezuela) Juan Enrique García (Monagas/Mineros, 19 goals)
84	2003–04	Caracas (7)	Deportivo Táchira	(Venezuela) Noel Sanvicente	(Venezuela) Juan Enrique García (Mineros, 18 goals)
85	2004–05	Unión Atlético Maracaibo (1)	Caracas	(Uruguay) (Venezuela) Carlos Maldonado	(Argentina) Daniel Delfino (Carabobo, 19 goals)
86	2005–06	Caracas (8)	Unión Atlético Maracaibo	(Venezuela) Noel Sanvicente	(Venezuela) Juan Enrique García (Deportivo Táchira, 21 goals)
87	2006–07	Caracas (9)	Unión Atlético Maracaibo	(Venezuela) Noel Sanvicente	(Colombia) Robinson Rentería (Trujillanos, 19 goals)
88	2007–08	Deportivo Táchira (6)	Caracas	(Uruguay) (Venezuela) Carlos Maldonado	(Venezuela) Alexander Rondon (Deportivo Anzoátegui, 19 goals)
89	2008–09	Caracas (10)	Deportivo Italia	(Venezuela) Noel Sanvicente	(Venezuela) Daniel Arismendi (Maracaibo/Deportivo Táchira, 17 goals) (Venezuela) Heatklif Castillo (Aragua, 17 goals)
90	2009–10	Caracas (11)	Deportivo Táchira	(Venezuela) Ceferino Bencomo	(Colombia) Norman Cabrera (Atlético El Vigía, 20 goals)
91	2010–11	Deportivo Táchira (7)	Zamora	(Colombia) Jorge Luis Pinto	(Venezuela) Daniel Arismendi (Deportivo Anzoátegui, 20 goals)
92	2011–12	Deportivo Lara (1)	Caracas	(Venezuela) Eduardo Saragó	(Venezuela) Rafael Castellín (Deportivo Lara, 21 goals)
93	2012–13	Zamora (1)	Deportivo Anzoátegui	(Venezuela) Noel Sanvicente	(Panama) Gabriel Torres (Zamora, 19 goals)
94	2013–14	Zamora (2)	Mineros de Guayana	(Venezuela) Noel Sanvicente	(Venezuela) Juan Falcón (Zamora, 19 goals)
95	2014–15	Deportivo Táchira (8)	Trujillanos	(Venezuela) Daniel Farías	(Panama) Edwin Aguilar (Deportivo Anzoategui, 23 goals)
96	2016	Zamora (3)	Zulia	(Venezuela) Francesco Stifano	(Panama) Gabriel Torres (Zamora, 22 goals)
97	2017	Monagas (1)	Deportivo Lara	(Venezuela) Jhonny Ferreira	(Venezuela) Anthony Blondell (Monagas, 24 goals)
98	2018	Zamora (4)	Deportivo Lara	(Venezuela) Alí Cañas	(Venezuela) Anthony Uribe (Zamora, 16 goals)
99	2019	Caracas (12)	Estudiantes de Mérida	(Venezuela) Noel Sanvicente	Edder Farías (Atlético Venezuela, 18 goals)
100	2020	Deportivo La Guaira (1)	Deportivo Táchira	(Venezuela) Daniel Farías	Richard Blanco (Mineros, 8 goals); Edder Farías (Atlético Venezuela, 8 goals)
101	2021	Deportivo Táchira (9)	Caracas	(Venezuela) Juan Domingo Tolisano	(Benin) Samson Akinyoola (Caracas, 18 goals)
102	2022	Metropolitanos (1)	Monagas	(Venezuela) José María Morr	(Colombia) Kevin Viveros (Carabobo, 21 goals)
103	2023	Deportivo Táchira (10)	Caracas	(Venezuela) Eduardo Saragó	(Venezuela) Luifer Hernández (Academia Puerto Cabello, 18 goals)
104	2024	Deportivo Táchira (11)	Carabobo	(Venezuela) Edgar Pérez Greco	(Colombia) Juan Camilo Zapata (Inter de Barinas/Universidad Central, 16 goals)
105	2025	Universidad Central (4)	Carabobo	(Venezuela) Daniel Sasso	(Venezuela) Edwuin Pernía (Academia Puerto Cabello, 15 goals)
106	2026				

== Titles by club ==
Clubs in bold compete in Primera División as of the 2026 season. Clubs in italic no longer exist.

Rank	Club	Winners	Runners-Up	Winning years	Runners-Up years
1	**Caracas**	12	5	1991–92, 1993–94, 1994–95, 1996–97, 2000–01, 2002–03, 2003–04, 2005–06, 2006–07, 2008–09, 2009–10, 2019	2004–05, 2007–08, 2011–12, 2021, 2023
2	**Deportivo Táchira**	11	9	1979, 1981, 1984, 1986, 1999–00, 2007–08, 2010–11, 2014–15, 2021, 2023, 2024	1982, 1985, 1986–87, 1987–88, 1989–90, 1998–99, 2003–04, 2009–10, 2020
3	Unión	7	3	1932, 1934, 1935, 1939, 1940, 1947, 1950	1929, 1930, 1948
4	Dos Caminos	6	7	1936, 1937, 1938, 1942, 1945, 1949	1932, 1933, 1934, 1935, 1940, 1941, 1944
5	Deportivo Petare	5	7	1961, 1963, 1966, 1972, 1998–99	1965, 1968, 1970, 1971, 1984, 1999–00, 2008–09
5	**Portuguesa**	5	3	1973, 1975, 1976, 1977, 1978	1974, 1980, 1983
7	Centro Atlético	4	7	1922, 1924, 1926, 1930	1921, 1923, 1927, 1928, 1931, 1936, 1946
7	Deportivo Galicia	4	5	1964, 1969, 1970, 1974	1967, 1972, 1978, 1979
7	Deportivo Portugués	4	3	1958, 1960, 1962, 1967	1959, 1963, 1966
7	**Universidad Central**	4	3	1951, 1953, 1957, 2025	1947, 1949, 1962
7	Marítimo	4	1	1986–87, 1987–88, 1989–90, 1992–93	1990–91
7	**Zamora**	4 (Note: Zamora won the Torneo de Adecuación in 2015, but this title is not counted as it was not a full season.)	1	2012–13, 2013–14, 2016, 2018	2010–11
7	Deportivo Venezuela	4	—	1928, 1929, 1931, 1933	—
14	Loyola	3	5	1925, 1943, 1944	1942, 1945, 1951, 1952, 1954
15	**Estudiantes de Mérida**	2	8	1980, 1985	1975, 1976, 1977, 1981, 1986, 1997–98, 2001–02, 2019
15	Deportivo Español	2	3	1946, 1959	1955, 1958, 1960
15	La Salle	2	3	1952, 1955	1950, 1953, 1956
15	América	2	1	1921, 1923	1922
15	Universidad de Los Andes	2	—	1983, 1990–91	—
20	Litoral	1	4	1941	1937, 1938, 1939, 1943
20	**Carabobo**	1	4	1971	1969, 1973, 2024, 2025
20	Unión Atlético Maracaibo	1	3	2004–05	2002–03, 2005–06, 2006–07
20	Minervén	1	3	1995–96	1991–92, 1992–93, 1994–95
20	Deportivo Lara	1	2	2011–12	2017, 2018
20	Mineros de Guayana	1	2	1988–89	1995–96, 2013–14
20	Venzóleo	1	2	1927	1925, 1926
20	Atlético Zulia	1	1	1997–98	1996–97
20	**Monagas**	1	1	2017	2022
20	Banco Obrero	1	—	1956	—
20	**Deportivo La Guaira**	1	—	2020	—
20	Deportivo Vasco	1	—	1954	—
20	Lara	1	—	1965	—
20	**Metropolitanos**	1	—	2022	—
20	Nacional Táchira	1	—	2001–02	—
20	San Cristóbal	1	—	1982	—
20	Unión Deportiva Canarias	1	—	1968	—

== Half-year / Short tournaments ==
=== Copa Bolivariana ===
Season		Champion	Runner-up	Third place
2000–01	Occidental	Deportivo Táchira	Universidad de Los Andes	Trujillanos
2000–01	Oriental	Caracas	Deportivo Italchacao	Carabobo

=== Apertura and Clausura seasons ===
Season		Champion	Runner-up	Third place
1996–97	Apertura	Atlético Zulia	Minervén	Unión Atlético Táchira
1996–97	Clausura	Caracas	Unión Atlético Táchira	Estudiantes de Mérida
1997–98	Apertura	Atlético Zulia	Deportivo Italia	Trujillanos
1997–98	Clausura	Estudiantes de Mérida	Trujillanos	Deportivo Italia
1998–99	Apertura	Unión Atlético Táchira	Estudiantes de Mérida	Caracas
1998–99	Clausura	Deportivo Italchacao	Estudiantes de Mérida	Universidad de Los Andes
1999–00	Apertura	Deportivo Táchira	Estudiantes de Mérida	Deportivo Italchacao
1999–00	Clausura	Deportivo Táchira	Deportivo Italchacao	Caracas
2001–02	Apertura	Estudiantes de Mérida	Monagas	Deportivo Táchira
2001–02	Clausura	Nacional Táchira	Monagas	Deportivo Italchacao
2002–03	Apertura	Caracas	Deportivo Italchacao	Carabobo
2002–03	Clausura	Unión Atlético Maracaibo	Deportivo Italchacao	Trujillanos
2003–04	Apertura	Caracas	Deportivo Táchira	Mineros de Guayana
2003–04	Clausura	Caracas	Deportivo Táchira	Carabobo
2004–05	Apertura	Unión Atlético Maracaibo	Caracas	Mineros de Guayana
2004–05	Clausura	Unión Atlético Maracaibo	Caracas	Deportivo Táchira
2005–06	Apertura	Unión Atlético Maracaibo	Deportivo Táchira	Mineros de Guayana
2005–06	Clausura	Caracas	Deportivo Táchira	Carabobo
2006–07	Apertura	Caracas	Unión Atlético Maracaibo	Mineros de Guayana
2006–07	Clausura	Unión Atlético Maracaibo	Caracas	Mineros de Guayana
2007–08	Apertura	Caracas	Deportivo Anzoátegui	Deportivo Táchira
2007–08	Clausura	Deportivo Táchira	Caracas	Deportivo Anzoátegui
2008–09	Apertura	Deportivo Italia	Monagas	Caracas
2008–09	Clausura	Caracas	Deportivo Táchira	Estudiantes de Mérida
2009–10	Apertura	Deportivo Táchira	Deportivo Italia	Caracas
2009–10	Clausura	Caracas	Deportivo Táchira	Deportivo Italia
2010–11	Apertura	Deportivo Táchira	Real Esppor	Caracas
2010–11	Clausura	Zamora	Caracas	Deportivo Anzoátegui
2011–12	Apertura	Deportivo Lara	Caracas	Deportivo Petare
2011–12	Clausura	Deportivo Lara	Mineros de Guayana	Deportivo Anzoátegui
2012–13	Apertura	Deportivo Anzoátegui	Caracas	Deportivo Lara
2012–13	Clausura	Zamora	Deportivo Anzoátegui	Deportivo Lara
2013–14	Apertura	Mineros de Guayana	Caracas	Zamora
2013–14	Clausura	Zamora	Mineros de Guayana	Deportivo Táchira
2014–15	Apertura	Trujillanos	Deportivo La Guaira	Caracas
2014–15	Clausura	Deportivo Táchira	Caracas	Zamora
2015	Adecuación	Zamora	Deportivo La Guaira	—^{[A]}
2016	Apertura	Zamora	Deportivo Anzoátegui	—^{[A]}
2016	Clausura	Zulia	Deportivo Táchira	—^{[A]}
2017	Apertura	Monagas	Caracas	—^{[A]}
2017	Clausura	Deportivo Lara	Mineros de Guayana	—^{[A]}
2018	Apertura	Zamora	Mineros de Guayana	—^{[A]}
2018	Clausura	Deportivo Lara	Deportivo La Guaira	—^{[A]}
2019	Apertura	Estudiantes de Mérida	Mineros de Guayana	—^{[A]}
2019	Clausura	Caracas	Deportivo Táchira	—^{[A]}
2024	Apertura	Carabobo	Metropolitanos	—^{[A]}
2024	Clausura	Deportivo Táchira	Carabobo	—^{[A]}
2025	Apertura	Universidad Central	Deportivo Táchira	—^{[A]}
2025	Clausura	Carabobo	Academia Puerto Cabello	—^{[A]}
2026	Apertura	Carabobo	Academia Puerto Cabello	—^{[A]}
2026	Clausura			—^{[A]}

== Footnotes ==
A. No third team recorded so the championship was played in a two zones format, where both teams qualified first played a final.

== See also ==
- Venezuelan football league system
