= 1958 Venezuelan Primera División season =

Venezuelan Primera División
- Season: 1958
- Champions: Deportivo Portugués (1st title)

The 1958 season of the Venezuelan Primera División, the top category of Venezuelan football, was played by 5 teams. The national champions were Deportivo Portugués.

== Results ==
=== Standings ===
Pos	Team	Pld	W	D	L	GF	GA	GD	Pts
1	Deportivo Portugués	8	5	1	2	11	6	+5	11
2	Deportivo Español	8	5	0	3	14	12	+2	10
3	Loyola	8	3	3	2	13	10	+3	9
4	La Salle	8	2	2	4	8	10	−2	6
5	Danubio	8	1	2	5	6	14	−8	4
