= 1957 Venezuelan Primera División season =

Venezuelan Primera División
- Season: 1957
- Champions: Universidad Central (1st title)

The 1957 season of the Venezuelan Primera División, the top category of Venezuelan football, was played by 6 teams. The national champions were Universidad Central.

== Standings ==
Pos	Team	Pld	W	D	L	GF	GA	GD	Pts
1	Universidad Central	15	10	3	2	39	17	+22	23
2	La Salle	15	8	2	5	39	19	+20	18
3	Banco Obrero	15	7	3	5	30	26	+4	17
4	Deprotivo Español	15	5	3	7	32	43	−11	13
5	Catalonia FC	15	4	2	9	28	38	−10	10
6	Deportivo Vasco	15	3	3	9	23	48	−25	9
