= 1969 Venezuelan Primera División season =

Venezuelan Primera División
- Season: 1969
- Champions: Deportivo Galicia (2nd title)

The 1969 season of the Venezuelan Primera División, the top category of Venezuelan football, was played by 9 teams. The national champions were Deportivo Galicia.

== Results ==
=== Standings ===
| Pos | Team | Pld | W | D | L | GF | GA | GD | Pts |
|---|---|---|---|---|---|---|---|---|---|
| 1 | Deportivo Galicia | 32 | 16 | 9 | 7 | 58 | 43 | +15 | 41 |
| 2 | Deportivo Italia | 32 | 17 | 6 | 9 | 55 | 32 | +23 | 40 |
| 3 | Valencia | 32 | 18 | 4 | 10 | 59 | 36 | +23 | 40 |
| 4 | Unión Deportiva Canarias | 32 | 13 | 8 | 11 | 42 | 39 | +3 | 34 |
| 5 | Anzoátegui FC | 32 | 13 | 8 | 11 | 44 | 43 | +1 | 34 |
| 6 | Lara | 32 | 11 | 10 | 11 | 46 | 46 | 0 | 32 |
| 7 | Deportivo Portugués | 32 | 8 | 12 | 12 | 44 | 50 | −6 | 28 |
| 8 | Aragua | 32 | 8 | 8 | 16 | 36 | 34 | +2 | 24 |
| 9 | Zulia | 32 | 5 | 5 | 22 | 29 | 60 | −31 | 15 |
