= 1966 Venezuelan Primera División season =

Venezuelan Primera División
- Season: 1966
- Champions: Deportivo Italia (3rd title)

The 1966 season of the Venezuelan Primera División, the top category of Venezuelan football, was played by 9 teams. The national champions were Deportivo Italia.

== Results ==
=== Standings ===
Pos	Team	Pld	W	D	L	GF	GA	GD	Pts
1	Deportivo Italia	24	15	5	4	46	27	+19	35
2	Deportivo Portugués	24	12	8	4	52	31	+21	32
3	Deportivo Galicia	24	12	8	4	43	22	+21	32
4	Lara	24	10	5	9	43	36	+7	25
5	Unión Deportiva Canarias	24	9	6	9	27	32	−5	24
6	Valencia	24	8	7	9	36	41	−5	23
7	Nacional FC	24	3	12	9	25	34	−9	18
8	Litoral	24	5	5	14	22	50	−28	15
9	Aragua	24	2	8	14	20	41	−21	12
