= 1972 Venezuelan Primera División season =

Venezuelan Primera División
- Season: 1972
- Champions: Deportivo Italia (4th title)

The 1972 season of the Venezuelan Primera División, the top category of Venezuelan football, was played by 9 teams. The national champions were Deportivo Italia.

== Results ==
=== First Stage ===
Pos	Team	Pld	W	D	L	GF	GA	GD	Pts
1	Deportivo Italia	16	9	2	5	22	15	+7	20
2	Tiquire Aragua	16	8	3	5	24	18	+6	19
3	Anzoátegui FC	16	6	6	4	18	12	+6	18
4	Estudiantes de Mérida	16	6	6	4	15	14	+1	18
5	Deportivo Galicia	16	6	5	5	11	9	+2	17
6	Unión Deportivo Canarias	16	4	9	3	11	12	−1	17
7	Portuguesa	16	6	4	6	23	19	+4	16
8	Valencia	16	3	4	9	12	19	−7	10
9	Deportivo Portugués	16	3	3	10	12	30	−18	9

=== Second Stage ===
Pos	Team	Pld	W	D	L	GF	GA	GD	Pts
1	Anzoátegui FC	16	10	5	1	22	8	+14	25
2	Deportivo Galicia	16	7	7	2	17	11	+6	21
3	Valencia	16	8	5	3	19	11	+8	21
4	Estudiantes de Mérida	16	8	4	4	16	12	+4	20
5	Portuguesa	16	4	6	6	17	17	0	14
6	Deportivo Italia	16	2	7	7	7	12	−5	11
7	Tiquire Aragua	16	2	7	7	18	27	−9	11
8	Deportivo Portugués	16	2	7	7	13	22	−9	11
9	Unión Deportivo Canarias	16	3	4	9	14	23	−9	10

==== Second Place Playoff ====
November 15, 1972

Deportivo Galicia	2–0	Valencia

=== Final stage ===
Pos	Team	Pld	W	D	L	GF	GA	GD	Pts
1	Deportivo Italia	6	3	1	2	5	5	0	7
2	Anzoátegui FC	6	3	0	3	11	9	+2	6
3	Deportivo Galicia	6	3	0	3	10	9	+1	6
4	Tiquire Aragua	6	2	1	3	8	11	−3	5

==== Second Place Playoff ====
December 23, 1972

Deportivo Galicia	4–0	Anzoátegui FC

December 2, 1972

Anzoátegui FC	2–2	Deportivo Galicia
