= 1959 Venezuelan Primera División season =

Venezuelan Primera División
- Season: 1959
- Champions: Deportivo Español (1st title)

The 1959 season of the Venezuelan Primera División, the top category of Venezuelan football, was played by 5 teams. The national champions were Deportivo Español.

== Results ==
=== Standings ===
Pos	Team	Pld	W	D	L	GF	GA	GD	Pts
1	Deportivo Español	12	9	1	2	35	13	+22	19
2	Deportivo Portugués	12	8	2	2	34	15	+19	18
3	Danubio	12	4	2	6	14	25	−11	10
4	La Salle	12	3	2	7	14	22	−8	8
5	Deportivo Italia	12	1	3	8	18	40	−22	5
