= 1963 Venezuelan Primera División season =

Venezuelan Primera División
- Season: 1963
- Champions: Deportivo Italia (2nd title)

The 1963 season of the Venezuelan Primera División, the top category of Venezuelan football, was played by 6 teams. The national champions were Deportivo Italia.

== Results ==
=== First stage ===
Pos	Team	Pld	W	D	L	GF	GA	GD	Pts
1	Tiquire Flores	10	6	1	3	27	22	+5	13
2	Deportivo Galicia	10	4	5	1	16	12	+4	13
3	Deportivo Portugués	10	4	3	3	20	21	−1	11
4	Deportivo Italia	10	3	5	2	18	15	+3	11
5	La Salle	10	2	3	5	19	23	−4	7
6	Unión Deportiva Canarias	10	1	3	6	13	20	−7	5

=== Final stage ===
Pos	Team	Pld	W	D	L	GF	GA	GD	Pts
1	Deportivo Portugués	3	2	1	0	8	3	+5	5
2	Deportivo Italia	3	2	1	0	6	2	+4	5
3	Tiquire Flores	3	1	0	2	3	6	−3	2
4	Deportivo Galicia	3	0	0	3	3	9	−6	0

=== Championship play-off ===
Deportivo Italia	2 – 1	Deportivo Portugués
