= 1977 Venezuelan Primera División season =

Venezuelan Primera División
- Season: 1977
- Champions: Portuguesa (4th title)

The 1977 season of the Venezuelan Primera División, the top category of Venezuelan football, was played by 12 teams. The national champions were Portuguesa.

== Results ==
=== First stage ===
Pos	Team	Pld	W	D	L	GF	GA	GD	Pts
1	Portuguesa	22	14	7	1	51	15	+36	35
2	Deportivo Italia	22	11	5	6	27	13	+14	27
3	Estudiantes de Mérida	22	9	9	4	27	13	+14	27
4	Deportivo Portugués	22	8	11	3	27	18	+9	27
5	Universidad de Los Andes	22	9	8	5	39	26	+13	26
6	Valencia	22	10	6	6	31	20	+11	26
7	Deportivo Galicia	22	9	6	7	24	23	+1	24
8	Barquisimeto FC	22	6	7	9	22	29	−7	19
9	San Cristóbal	22	7	4	11	30	36	−6	18
10	Universitarios de Oriente	22	4	8	10	18	36	−18	16
11	Atlético Zamora	22	3	6	13	14	37	−23	12
12	Unión Deportiva Canarias	22	2	3	17	16	60	−44	7

=== Sixth Place Playoff ===
Pos	Team	Pld	W	D	L	GF	GA	GD	Pts
1	Valencia	3	2	0	1	5	3	+2	4
2	Deportivo Galicia	3	1	1	1	3	2	+1	3
3	San Cristóbal	2	1	0	1	3	4	−1	2
4	Barquisimeto FC	2	0	1	1	1	3	−2	1

=== Final Stage ===
Pos	Team	Pld	W	D	L	GF	GA	GD	Pts
1	Portuguesa	10	6	2	2	18	9	+9	14
2	Estudiantes de Mérida	10	4	5	1	12	8	+4	13
3	Valencia	10	4	3	3	13	12	+1	11
4	Deportivo Portugués	10	3	4	3	14	14	0	10
5	Deportivo Italia	10	4	1	5	14	15	−1	9
6	Universidad de Los Andes	10	1	1	8	10	23	−13	3

==== Title Playoff ====
December 18, 1977

Estudiantes de Mérida	2–4	Portuguesa

December 21, 1977

Portuguesa	3–0	Estudiantes de Mérida
