= 1998-I Pre-Libertadores tournament =

Tournament details
- Dates: 4-26 February
- Teams: 4 (from 2 associations)

Tournament statistics
- Matches played: 8
- Goals scored: 24 (3 per match)
- Top scorer: (Mexico) Gustavo Nápoles (4 goals)

The 1998-I Pre-Libertadores tournament was the first edition of the Pre-Libertadores tournament, the annual qualifying tournament between teams from Venezuela and Mexico, that defined two teams qualified to the next Copa Libertadores. It was held from 4 to 26 February 1998.

The tournament was contested by two teams from Venezuela, Caracas and Atlético Zulia, and two teams from Mexico, América and Guadalajara. The top two teams qualified to the 1998 Copa Libertadores where they joined Brazilian clubs Grêmio and Vasco da Gama in the Group 2 of the competition.

== Participating clubs ==
Originally, the two Mexican teams were to be determined in a preliminary round organized by the Mexican Football Federation between América, Guadalajara, Cruz Azul and Atlante. However, Cruz Azul and Atlante declined to participate, leaving America and Guadalajara to advance directly to the Pre-Libertadores.

The two Venezuelan teams were the champions and runners-up of the 1996–97 Venezuelan Primera División season.

Association	Team	Qualification method
Mexico	América (Mexico 1)	Designated by the Mexican Football Federation
Mexico	Guadalajara (Mexico 2)	Designated by the Mexican Football Federation
Venezuela	Caracas (Venezuela 1)	1996–97 Venezuelan Primera División season champions
Venezuela	Atlético Zulia (Venezuela 2)	1996–97 Venezuelan Primera División season runners-up

Note

1. Mexico (MEX): The order of Mexican teams was defined in a play-off played on 14 January 1998 which was won by América 2–0 over Guadalajara.

== Results ==
=== Standings ===
Pos	Team	Pld	W	D	L	GF	GA	GD	Pts	Qualification
1	(Mexico) Guadalajara	4	3	1	0	12	5	+7	10	1998 Copa Libertadores Group 2
2	(Mexico) América	4	2	1	1	5	2	+3	7	1998 Copa Libertadores Group 2
3	(Venezuela) Caracas	4	1	2	1	4	6	−2	5	
4	(Venezuela) Atlético Zulia	4	0	0	4	3	11	−8	0	

Updated to match(es) played on unknown. Source:

=== Matches ===
The match schedule had to be reduced because the start date of the 1998 Copa Libertadores was near (25 February), so matches between teams from the same country were omitted. Each team played a total of 4 matches.

4 February 1998
16:00 UTC−4

Atlético Zulia (Venezuela)	2–3	(Mexico) Guadalajara
Vera 24'; J. García 73'	Report	Nápoles 31', 68'; Romero 90+'

Estadio Misael Delgado, Valencia
Referee: Luis Seminario (Peru)
6 February 1998
16:00 UTC−4

Caracas (Venezuela)	1–1	(Mexico) Guadalajara
González 59'	Report	Sánchez 61'

Estadio Brígido Iriarte, Caracas
Referee: César Córdoba (Peru)
10 February 1998
16:00 UTC−4

Atlético Zulia (Venezuela)	0–2	(Mexico) América
	Report	Peláez 3'; C. García 89' (o.g.)

Estadio Misael Delgado, Valencia
Referee: César Córdoba (Peru)
13 February 1998
16:00 UTC−4

Caracas (Venezuela)	1–0	(Mexico) América
Rey 3'	Report

Estadio Brígido Iriarte, Caracas
Referee: Roger Zambrano (Ecuador)

17 February 1998
16:00 UTC−6

Guadalajara (Mexico)	4–1	(Venezuela) Atlético Zulia
Chávez 27' (pen.), 33' (pen.); Ramírez 62'; Nápoles 64'	Report	J. García 4'

Estadio Jalisco, Guadalajara
Referee: John Jairo Tenorio (Colombia)
19 February 1998
16:00 UTC−6

América (Mexico)	2–0	(Venezuela) Atlético Zulia
Peláez 25'; Terrazas 30'	Report

Estadio Azteca, Mexico City
Referee: César Córdoba (Peru)
24 February 1998
16:00 UTC−6

Guadalajara (Mexico)	4–1	(Venezuela) Caracas
Chávez 13'; Arellano 31'; Ramírez 50'; Nápoles 71'	Report	Bidoglio 18'

Estadio Jalisco, Guadalajara
Referee: Eduardo Gamboa (Chile)
26 February 1998
16:00 UTC−6

América (Mexico)	1–1	(Venezuela) Caracas
Valenzuela 27'	Report	Ramos 86'

Estadio Azteca, Mexico City
Referee: Mario Sánchez (Chile)

== Goalscorers ==
There were 24 goals scored in 8 matches, for an average of 3 goals per match.

4 goals

- (Mexico) Gustavo Nápoles (Guadalajara)

3 goals

- (Mexico) Paulo Chávez (Guadalajara)

2 goals

- (Venezuela) Juan Enrique García (Atlético Zulia)
- (Mexico) Ricardo Peláez (America)
- (Mexico) Ramón Ramírez (Guadalajara)

1 goal

- (Mexico) Jesús Arellano (Guadalajara)
- (Argentina) Héctor Bidoglio (Caracas)
- (Venezuela) Leonardo González (Caracas)
- (Venezuela) Isaac Ramos (Atlético Zulia)
- (Venezuela) José Manuel Rey (Caracas)
- (Mexico) Camilo Romero (Guadalajara)
- (Mexico) Joel Sánchez (Guadalajara)
- (Mexico) Isaac Terrazas (America)
- (Mexico) Rodrigo Valenzuela (America)
- (Venezuela) Luis Vera (Atlético Zulia)

1 own goal

- (Venezuela) Carlos García (from Atlético Zulia against America)
