= 1960 Venezuelan Primera División season =

Venezuelan Primera División
- Season: 1960
- Champions: Deportivo Portugués (2nd title)

The 1960 season of the Venezuelan Primera División, the top category of Venezuelan football, was played by 4 teams. The national champions were Deportivo Portugués.

== Results ==
=== First round ===
Pos	Team	Pld	W	D	L	GF	GA	GD	Pts
1	Deportivo Portugués	3	3	0	0	9	3	+6	6
2	Deportivo Italia	3	2	0	1	6	3	+3	4
3	Deportivo Español	3	1	0	2	3	6	−3	2
4	Deportivo Celta	3	0	0	3	3	9	−6	0

=== Second round ===
Pos	Team	Pld	W	D	L	GF	GA	GD	Pts
1	Portugués	3	2	1	0	10	2	+8	5
2	Español	3	2	1	0	6	4	+2	5
3	Deportivo Italia	3	1	0	2	4	5	−1	2
4	Deportivo Celta	3	0	0	3	3	12	−9	0

==== Tiebreaker play-off ====
Deportivo Español	1 – 0	Deportivo Portugués

=== Championship play-off ===
Deportivo Portugués	3 – 0	Deportivo Español

Deportivo Español	0 – 3	Deportivo Portugués
