= 1997–98 Venezuelan Primera División season =

Venezuelan Primera División
- Season: 1997–98
- Champions: Atlético Zulia (1st title)

The 1997–98 season of the Venezuelan Primera División, the top category of Venezuelan football, was played by 12 teams. The national champions were Atlético Zulia.

== Torneo Apertura ==
Pos	Team	Pld	W	D	L	GF	GA	GD	Pts
1	Atlético Zulia	22	13	5	4	42	23	+19	44
2	Deportivo Italia	22	12	5	5	45	28	+17	41
3	Trujillanos	22	10	7	5	24	17	+7	37
4	Unión Atlético Táchira	22	10	6	6	26	23	+3	36
5	Caracas	22	10	5	7	36	29	+7	35
6	Carabobo	22	8	7	7	26	25	+1	31
7	Estudiantes de Mérida	22	8	6	8	32	28	+4	30
8	Nacional Táchira	22	9	2	11	35	35	0	29
9	Minervén	22	7	8	7	25	27	−2	29
10	Mineros de Guayana	22	5	5	12	28	31	−3	20
11	Atlético El Vigía	22	4	5	13	16	43	−27	17
12	Llaneros	22	3	5	14	17	43	−26	14

== Torneo Clausura ==
Pos	Team	Pld	W	D	L	GF	GA	GD	Pts
1	Estudiantes de Mérida	22	14	2	6	43	24	+19	44
2	Trujillanos	22	12	6	4	33	20	+13	42
3	Deportivo Italia	22	11	5	6	35	27	+8	38
4	Caracas	22	10	4	8	32	28	+4	34
5	Atlético Zulia	22	9	7	6	34	33	+1	34
6	Llaneros	22	8	7	7	38	36	+2	31
7	Carabobo	22	7	8	7	37	42	−5	29
8	Mineros de Guayana	22	8	2	12	32	35	−3	26
9	Unión Atlético Táchira	22	7	5	10	25	34	−9	26
10	Minervén	22	7	3	12	32	46	−14	24
11	Atlético El Vigía	22	4	7	11	29	35	−6	19
12	Nacional Táchira	22	4	6	12	19	29	−10	18

== Final Playoff ==
May 24, 1998

Estudiantes de Mérida	0–1	Atlético Zulia

May 31, 1998

Atlético Zulia	4–0	Estudiantes de Mérida

== Copa CONMEBOL Playoff ==
May 24, 1998

Deportivo Italia	3–1	Trujillanos

May 31, 1998

Trujillanos	2–2	Deportivo Italia
