= 1979 Venezuelan Primera División season =

Venezuelan Primera División
- Season: 1979
- Champions: Deportivo Táchira (1st title)

The 1979 season of the Venezuelan Primera División, the top category of Venezuelan football, was played by 12 teams. The national champions were Deportivo Táchira.

== Results ==
=== First stage ===
Pos	Team	Pld	W	D	L	GF	GA	GD	Pts
1	Deportivo Táchira	22	11	7	4	29	16	+13	29
2	Universidad de Los Andes	22	11	6	5	30	17	+13	28
3	Deportivo Galicia	22	7	13	2	18	10	+8	27
4	Atlético Zamora	22	8	10	4	25	17	+8	26
5	Estudiantes de Mérida	22	11	4	7	23	17	+6	26
6	Portuguesa	22	8	9	5	19	12	+7	25
7	Deportivo Italia	22	9	6	7	30	25	+5	24
8	Deportivo Lara FC	22	9	5	8	27	26	+1	23
9	Deportivo Portugués	22	8	5	9	32	34	−2	21
10	Valencia	22	5	6	11	18	27	−9	16
11	Miranda-Canarias	22	2	7	13	19	42	−23	11
12	Atlético Falcón	22	2	4	16	16	43	−27	8

=== Final Stage ===
Pos	Team	Pld	W	D	L	GF	GA	GD	Pts
1	Deportivo Táchira	10	6	1	3	15	7	+8	13
2	Deportivo Galicia	10	6	1	3	17	7	+10	13
3	Universidad de Los Andes	10	5	2	3	11	6	+5	12
4	Deportivo Italia	10	4	3	3	9	7	+2	11
5	Atlético Zamora	10	2	2	6	9	16	−7	6
6	Estudiantes de Mérida	10	0	5	5	3	21	−18	5
