= 1984 Venezuelan Primera División season =

Season of the Venezuelan Premier League

Venezuelan Primera División
- Season: 1984
- Champions: Deportivo Táchira (3rd title)

The 1984 season of the Venezuelan Primera División, the top category of Venezuelan football, was played by 11 teams. The national champions were Deportivo Táchira.

== Results ==
=== First stage ===
Pos	Team	Pld	W	D	L	GF	GA	GD	Pts
1	Deportivo Italia	20	10	7	3	26	15	+11	27
2	San Cristóbal	20	8	9	3	17	10	+7	25
3	Deportivo Táchira	20	9	4	7	25	22	+3	22
4	Portuguesa	20	8	5	7	33	17	+16	21
5	Atlético Zamora	20	7	7	6	22	18	+4	21
6	Universidad de Los Andes	20	7	7	6	16	13	+3	21
7	Estudiantes de Mérida	20	7	6	7	17	13	+4	20
8	Portugués	20	7	6	7	24	24	0	20
9	Nacional Carabobo	20	5	8	7	14	17	−3	18
10	Petroleros del Zulia	20	4	4	12	10	32	−22	12
11	Mineros de Guayana	20	3	5	12	8	33	−25	11

=== Final Stage ===
Pos	Team	Pld	W	D	L	GF	GA	GD	Pts
1	Deportivo Táchira	14	9	3	2	23	11	+12	21
2	Deportivo Italia	14	8	3	3	20	13	+7	19
3	Atlético Zamora	14	9	1	4	22	17	+5	19
4	Universidad de Los Andes	14	7	3	4	21	11	+10	17
5	Deportivo Portugués	13	6	1	6	15	18	−3	13
6	San Cristóbal	14	4	4	6	9	16	−7	12
7	Estudiantes de Mérida	13	1	3	9	7	17	−10	5
8	Portuguesa	14	1	2	11	5	19	−14	4
