= 1974 Venezuelan Primera División season =

Venezuelan Primera División
- Season: 1972
- Champions: Deportivo Galicia (4th title)

The 1974 season of the Venezuelan Primera División, the top category of Venezuelan football, was played by 8 teams. The national champions were Deportivo Galicia.

== Results ==
=== First stage ===
Pos	Team	Pld	W	D	L	GF	GA	GD	Pts
1	Estudiantes de Mérida	28	16	8	4	52	31	+21	40
2	Deportivo Galicia	28	12	11	5	43	31	+12	35
3	Portuguesa	28	13	8	7	44	34	+10	34
4	Anzoátegui FC	28	12	8	8	39	37	+2	32
5	Valencia	28	11	8	9	44	30	+14	30
6	Tiquire-Canarias	28	5	9	14	26	42	−16	19
7	Deportivo Portugués	28	5	8	15	33	55	−22	18
8	Deportivo Italia	28	3	10	15	23	44	−21	16

=== Final Stage ===
Pos	Team	Pld	W	D	L	GF	GA	GD	Pts
1	Portuguesa	6	2	3	1	10	7	+3	7
2	Deportivo Galicia	6	2	3	1	7	6	+1	7
3	Estudiantes de Mérida	6	3	0	3	4	5	−1	6
4	Anzoátegui FC	6	1	2	3	5	8	−3	4

==== Second Place Playoff ====
December 8, 1972

Portuguesa	1–1	Deportivo Galicia

December 15, 1972

Deportivo Galicia	1–0	Portuguesa
