= 1994–95 Venezuelan Primera División season =

Venezuelan Primera División
- Season: 1994–95
- Champions: Caracas (3rd title)

The 1994–95 season of the Venezuelan Primera División, the top category of Venezuelan football, was played by 16 teams. The national champions were Caracas.

== Torneo Iniciación ==
=== Group A ===
Pos	Team	Pld	W	D	L	GF	GA	GD	Pts
1	Unión Deportivo Lara	10	8	1	1	14	5	+9	18
2	Trujillanos	10	6	1	3	20	15	+5	14
3	Atlético El Vigía	10	5	3	2	14	7	+7	13
4	UNICOL	10	3	2	5	10	13	−3	8
5	Maracaibo FC	10	1	4	5	7	13	−6	6
6	Universidad de Los Andes	10	1	1	8	14	26	−12	3

=== Group B ===
Pos	Team	Pld	W	D	L	GF	GA	GD	Pts
1	Unión Atlético Táchira	8	4	3	1	10	6	+4	12
2	Estudiantes de Mérida	8	3	2	3	9	10	−1	8
3	Llaneros	8	2	4	2	4	5	−1	8
4	San Cristóbal	8	2	3	3	5	6	−1	7
5	Atlético Zamora	0	0	0	0	0	0	0	0

=== Group C ===
Pos	Team	Pld	W	D	L	GF	GA	GD	Pts
1	Caracas	10	8	0	2	20	7	+13	17
2	Maritimo	10	6	2	2	16	11	+5	15
3	Deportivo Italia	10	4	3	3	15	15	0	11
4	Deportivo Tuy	10	5	0	5	21	12	+9	10
5	Valencia	10	2	4	4	12	11	+1	8
6	Saman de Aragua	10	0	1	9	3	31	−28	1

=== Group D ===
Pos	Team	Pld	W	D	L	GF	GA	GD	Pts
1	Mineros de Guayana	10	8	2	0	27	6	+21	18
2	Monagas	10	5	4	1	11	6	+5	14
3	Minervén	10	5	2	3	27	11	+16	13
4	Anzoátegui FC	10	4	3	3	20	13	+7	11
5	Marinos de Sucre	10	2	1	7	14	28	−14	5
6	Industriales de Caroni	10	0	0	10	4	39	−35	0

== Torneo Nacional ==
=== Group A ===
Pos	Team	Pld	W	D	L	GF	GA	GD	Pts
1	Mineros de Guayana	14	9	4	1	38	16	+22	31
2	Caracas	14	8	4	2	18	13	+5	30
3	Trujillanos	14	7	1	6	23	17	+6	23.75
4	Atlético El Vigía	14	6	5	3	23	17	+6	23
5	Estudiantes de Mérida	14	4	5	5	19	18	+1	17
6	San Cristóbal	14	2	6	6	10	23	−13	12
7	Deportivo Italia	14	2	5	7	11	20	−9	11
8	Anzoátegui FC	14	1	4	9	6	18	−12	7

=== Group B ===
Pos	Team	Pld	W	D	L	GF	GA	GD	Pts
1	Minervén	14	8	4	2	32	27	+5	29
2	Marítimo	14	7	6	1	22	11	+11	27
3	Unión Atlético Táchira	14	6	5	3	25	17	+8	24.5
4	Monagas	14	7	3	4	23	17	+6	24
5	Unión Deportivo Lara	14	5	3	6	15	17	−2	19.25
6	Llaneros	14	2	6	6	14	26	−12	12
7	UNICOL	14	2	4	8	11	17	−6	10
8	Deportivo Tuy	14	2	3	9	13	33	−20	9

== Torneo Finalización ==
Pos	Team	Pld	W	D	L	GF	GA	GD	Pts
1	Caracas	10	5	2	3	13	9	+4	17
2	Minervén	10	5	1	4	21	16	+5	16
3	Trujillanos	10	4	2	4	14	17	−3	14
4	Unión Deportivo Lara	10	3	4	3	12	14	−2	13
5	Mineros de Guayana	10	3	3	4	13	12	+1	12
6	Unión Atlético Táchira	10	3	2	5	16	21	−5	11
