= 1982 Venezuelan Primera División season =

Venezuelan Primera División
- Season: 1982
- Champions: San Cristóbal (1st title)

The 1982 season of the Venezuelan Primera División, the top category of Venezuelan football, was played by 12 teams. The national champions were San Cristóbal.

== Results ==
=== First stage ===
Pos	Team	Pld	W	D	L	GF	GA	GD	Pts
1	Universidad de Los Andes	22	12	5	5	29	13	+16	29
2	Estudiantes de Mérida	22	11	6	5	37	21	+16	28
3	San Cristóbal	22	9	9	4	23	14	+9	27
4	Deportivo Táchira	22	9	8	5	33	21	+12	26
5	Deportivo Italia	22	6	12	4	19	15	+4	24
6	Portuguesa	22	8	8	6	26	28	−2	24
7	Deportivo Galicia	22	6	12	4	17	20	−3	24
8	Petroleros del Zulia	22	7	7	8	26	29	−3	21
9	Deportivo Lara FC	22	5	10	7	17	23	−6	20
10	Atlético Zamora	22	4	8	10	21	26	−5	16
11	Deportivo Portugués	22	4	5	13	16	36	−20	13
12	Valencia	22	2	8	12	8	26	−18	12

=== Final Stage ===
Pos	Team	Pld	W	D	L	GF	GA	GD	Pts
1	San Cristóbal	10	3	6	1	9	9	0	12
2	Deportivo Táchira	10	3	5	2	9	6	+3	11
3	Universidad de Los Andes	10	4	3	3	9	9	0	11
4	Portuguesa	10	2	6	2	10	11	−1	10
5	Estudiantes de Mérida	10	3	2	5	14	12	+2	8
6	Deportivo Italia	10	2	4	4	6	10	−4	8
