= 1952 Small Club World Cup =

Tournament details
- Host country: Venezuela
- Dates: 12–29 July
- Teams: 4 (from 2 associations)
- Venue: 1 (in 1 host city)

Final positions
- Champions: (Spain) Real Madrid (1st title)

Tournament statistics
- Matches played: 12
- Goals scored: 50 (4.17 per match)
- Top scorer: (Spain) Pahiño (7 goals)

The 1952 Small Club World Cup was the first edition of the Small Club World Cup, a tournament held in Venezuela between 1952 and 1957, in certain years between 1963 and 1970, and in 1975. It was played by four participants, 1 from Europe and 3 from South America, playing in a double round-robin format.

The championship featured players such as Alfredo Di Stéfano, Adolfo Pedernera, and Nestor Rossi for Millonarios, Miguel Muñoz for Real Madrid, among others. Real Madrid was the only team that did not participate as champion of its country.

== Participants ==
Team	Qualification
(Brazil) Botafogo	Third in 1951 Campeonato Carioca
(Colombia) Millonarios	Champions of 1951 Campeonato Profesional
(Venezuela) La Salle	Champions of 1952 Primera División
(Spain) Real Madrid	Third in 1951–52 La Liga

== Matches ==
12 July

La Salle (Venezuela)	2–3	(Spain) Real Madrid
Olivares 28'; Cabillón 35'	Report	Molowny 49'; Pahiño 69'; Joseíto 76'

Estadio Olímpico, Caracas
Referee: Leo Di Leo (Italy)

14 July

Millonarios (Colombia)	4–4	(Brazil) Botafogo
Báez 4', 48'; Castillo 50', 59'	Report	Zuluaga 20' (o.g.); Octavio 49', 53'; Gerson 89'

Estadio Olímpico, Caracas

15 July

Millonarios (Colombia)	1–1	(Spain) Real Madrid
Rossi 19'	Report	Cabrera 30'

Estadio Olímpico, Caracas
Referee: Leo Di Leo (Italy)

16 July

La Salle (Venezuela)	1–1	(Brazil) Botafogo
De León 87'	Report	Zezinho 32'

Estadio Olímpico, Caracas

19 July

Botafogo (Brazil)	2–2	(Spain) Real Madrid
Jaime 9'; Zezinho 73'	Report	Pahiño 2', 77'

Estadio Olímpico, Caracas
Referee: Jackson (Venezuela)

20 July

La Salle (Venezuela)	0–4	(Colombia) Millonarios
	Report	Báez 10', 59'; Di Stéfano 51', 72'

Estadio Olímpico, Caracas

23 July

La Salle (Venezuela)	1–6	(Spain) Real Madrid
Zezinho 55'	Report	Pahiño 8', 15', 28', 41'; Molowny 51'; Alvarito 75'

Estadio Olímpico, Caracas
Referee: Rubén Sainz (Venezuela)

24 July

Botafogo (Brazil)	3–0	(Colombia) Millonarios
Paraguaio 49', 65'; Jaime 56'	Report

Estadio Olímpico, Caracas

27 July

Real Madrid (Spain)	1–1	(Colombia) Millonarios
Molowny 75'	Report	Di Stéfano 64'

Estadio Olímpico, Caracas
Referee: Ruben Sainz (Venezuela)

27 July

La Salle (Venezuela)	1–6	(Brazil) Botafogo
Alvarito 75'	Report	Paraguaio 8', 30', 55'; Octavio 18'; Braguinha 25'; Zezinho 83'

Estadio Olímpico, Caracas

29 July

La Salle (Venezuela)	1–5	(Colombia) Millonarios
Zuluaga 49' (o.g.)	Report	Di Stéfano 11', 25', 59'; Báez 14'; Rossi 37'

Estadio Olímpico, Caracas

29 July

Real Madrid (Spain)	0–0	(Brazil) Botafogo
	Report

Estadio Olímpico, Caracas
Referee: García Casaña (Venezuela)

== Final standing ==
Team	Pts	P	W	D	L	GF	GA	GD
(Spain) Real Madrid (Note: Won the tournament by the rule of goal difference.)	8	6	2	4	0	13	7	6
(Brazil) Botafogo	8	6	2	4	0	16	8	8
(Colombia) Millonarios	7	6	2	3	1	15	10	5
(Venezuela) La Salle	1	6	0	1	5	6	25	-19

== Topscorers ==
Player	Club	Goals
(Spain) Pahiño	(Spain) Real Madrid	7
(Argentina) Alfredo Di Stéfano	(Colombia) Millonarios FC	6
(Brazil) Paraguaio	(Brazil) Botafogo	5
(Argentina) Antonio Báez	(Colombia) Millonarios FC	5

== Champion ==
1952 Small Club World Cup
(Francoist Spain)
Real Madrid
1st. title
