= 1978 Venezuelan Primera División season =

Venezuelan Primera División
- Season: 1978
- Champions: Portuguesa (5th title)

The 1978 season of the Venezuelan Primera División, the top category of Venezuelan football, was played by 12 teams. The national champions were Portuguesa.

== Results ==
=== First stage ===
Pos	Team	Pld	W	D	L	GF	GA	GD	Pts
1	Portuguesa	22	11	6	5	33	22	+11	28
2	Universidad de Los Andes	22	11	5	6	43	27	+16	27
3	Deportivo Portugués	22	10	7	5	27	20	+7	27
4	Valencia	22	11	4	7	32	23	+9	26
5	Deportivo Galicia	22	9	8	5	24	17	+7	26
6	Estudiantes de Mérida	22	9	8	5	19	17	+2	26
7	Atlético Zamora	22	8	6	8	26	25	+1	22
8	Miranda-Canarias	22	8	6	8	30	30	0	22
9	Deportivo Táchira	22	6	5	11	20	22	−2	17
10	Deportivo Italia	22	5	7	10	27	30	−3	17
11	Deportivo Lara FC	22	5	5	12	19	40	−21	15
12	Universitarios de Oriente	22	4	3	15	19	46	−27	11

=== Final Stage ===
Pos	Team	Pld	W	D	L	GF	GA	GD	Pts
1	Portuguesa	10	6	4	0	18	6	+12	16
2	Deportivo Galicia	10	5	2	3	13	8	+5	12
3	Estudiantes de Mérida	10	5	1	4	12	8	+4	11
4	Deportivo Portugués	10	2	4	4	13	15	−2	8
5	Universidad de Los Andes	10	3	1	6	9	18	−9	7
6	Valencia	10	2	2	6	12	22	−10	6
