= 1973 Venezuelan Primera División season =

Venezuelan Primera División
- Season: 1973
- Champions: Portuguesa (1st title)

The 1973 season of the Venezuelan Primera División, the top category of Venezuelan football, was played by 9 teams. The national champions were Portuguesa.

== Results ==
=== Standings ===
Pos	Team	Pld	W	D	L	GF	GA	GD	Pts
1	Portuguesa	32	19	8	5	56	31	+25	46
2	Valencia	32	16	12	4	43	22	+21	44
3	Estudiantes de Mérida	32	17	10	5	47	26	+21	44
4	Anzoátegui FC	31	14	7	10	32	28	+4	35
5	Deportivo Galicia	32	12	10	10	42	36	+6	34
6	Deportivo Italia	32	10	11	11	27	31	−4	31
7	Unión Deportiva Canarias	32	8	10	14	30	40	−10	26
8	Deportivo Portugués	31	4	10	17	30	55	−25	18
9	Aragua	32	1	4	27	15	53	−38	6

=== Second Place Playoff ===
December 18, 1970

Valencia	0–0	Estudiantes de Mérida
Penalties
	4–2
