= 1980 Venezuelan Primera División season =

Football league

Venezuelan Primera División
- Season: 1980
- Champions: Estudiantes de Mérida (1st title)

The 1980 season of the Venezuelan Primera División, the top category of Venezuelan football, was played by eleven teams. The national champions were Estudiantes de Mérida.

== Results ==
=== First stage ===
Pos	Team	Pld	W	D	L	GF	GA	GD	Pts
1	Portuguesa	20	10	9	1	22	9	+13	29
2	Valencia	20	9	7	4	26	12	+14	25
3	Atlético Zamora	20	7	8	5	24	15	+9	22
4	Universidad de Los Andes	20	6	10	4	20	16	+4	22
5	Estudiantes de Mérida	20	7	8	5	19	18	+1	22
6	Deportivo Lara FC	20	6	10	4	16	16	0	22
7	Deportivo Táchira	20	6	9	5	18	15	+3	21
8	Deportivo Galicia	20	3	12	5	17	18	−1	18
9	Deportivo Italia	20	4	9	7	13	18	−5	17
10	Atlético Falcón	20	4	5	11	20	39	−19	13
11	Deportivo Portugués	20	1	7	12	8	27	−19	9

=== Final Stage ===
Pos	Team	Pld	W	D	L	GF	GA	GD	Pts
1	Estudiantes de Mérida	10	8	1	1	19	7	+12	17
2	Portuguesa	10	3	5	2	9	10	−1	13
3	Valencia	10	3	4	3	9	11	−2	11
4	Universidad de Los Andes	10	3	3	4	12	11	+1	9
5	Deportivo Lara FC	10	1	6	3	7	10	−3	8
6	Atlético Zamora	10	0	5	5	8	15	−7	5
