= 2000–01 Venezuelan Primera División season =

Venezuelan Primera División
- Season: 2000–01
- Champions: Caracas (5th title)

The 2000–01 season of the Venezuelan Primera División, the top category of Venezuelan football, was played by 10 teams. The national champions were Caracas.

== League table ==
Pos	Team	Pld	W	D	L	GF	GA	GD	Pts
1	Caracas	18	10	5	3	34	15	+19	35
2	Trujillanos	18	9	6	3	24	12	+12	33
3	Deportivo Italchacao	18	9	5	4	29	17	+12	32
4	Estudiantes de Mérida	18	8	5	5	30	23	+7	29
5	Deportivo Táchira	18	7	6	5	13	11	+2	27
6	Nacional Táchira	18	6	3	9	22	26	−4	21
7	Mineros de Guayana	18	5	4	9	20	28	−8	19
8	Universidad de Los Andes	18	5	3	10	17	33	−16	18
9	Monagas	18	4	5	9	21	35	−14	17
10	Carabobo	18	3	6	9	14	24	−10	15

== Promotion/relegation playoff ==
June 3, 2001

Portuguesa	2–1	Monagas

June 10, 2001

Monagas	2–1	Portuguesa
Penalties
	5–6
