= Carlos Arango =

Colombian footballer (1928–2014)

Personal information
- Date of birth: 31 January 1928
- Place of birth: Santa Marta, Colombia
- Date of death: 19 August 2014 (aged 86)
- Place of death: Los Angeles, United States
- Position: Forward

Senior career*
| Years | Team | Apps | (Gls) |
| 1948–1950 | Deportes Caldas | 69 | (51) |
| 1950 | Deportes Samario | | |
| 1951 | Atlético Nacional | 27 | (18) |
| 1952–1954 | Santa Fe | 32 | (10) |
| 1954–1955 | Independiente Medellín | 21 | (10) |
| 1956 | Cúcuta Deportivo | 23 | (15) |
| 1959 | Morelia | | |
| 1959–1960 | Unión Magdalena | 60 | (31) |
| 1961–1963 | Millonarios | 90 | (26) |
| – | La Salle | | |
| – | Vasco | | |
| – | Litoral | | |

International career
| 1946–1965 | Colombia | 22 | (6) |
Medal record
Representing Colombia
Men's Football
Central American and Caribbean Games
| Gold medal – first place | 1946 Barranquilla | Team competition |
- * Club domestic league appearances and goals

Carlos Arango Medina (31 January 1928 – 19 August 2014) was a Colombian footballer who played as a forward. He was nicknamed "El Maestro".

== Career ==
Born in Santa Marta, Arango began his professional football career with Deportes Caldas in 1948, and he would win the league title with Caldas in 1950. He was the only Colombian player in Deportes Samario's first professional squad in 1950. He also played for Atlético Nacional, Santa Fe, Independiente Medellín, Cúcuta Deportivo and Millonarios in Colombia, Monarcas Morelia in Mexico, and La Salle, Vasco and Litoral in Venezuela.

Arango made 22 appearances and scored six goals for the Colombia national football team from 1946 to 1965. He scored Colombia's first goal in FIFA World Cup qualifying, a header against Uruguay in Bogotá on 16 June 1957.

== Honours ==
=== International ===
Colombia

- Central American and Caribbean Games Gold Medal (1): 1946
