= 1975 Venezuelan Primera División season =

Season of the Venezuelan Premier League

Venezuelan Primera División
- Season: 1975
- Champions: Portuguesa (2nd title)

The 1975 season of the Venezuelan Primera División, the top category of Venezuelan football, was played by 8 teams. The national champions were Portuguesa.

== Results ==
=== First stage ===
Pos	Team	Pld	W	D	L	GF	GA	GD	Pts
1	Deportivo Galicia	28	13	10	5	39	29	+10	36
2	Portuguesa	27	13	7	7	38	22	+16	33
3	Estudiantes de Mérida	28	13	7	8	39	24	+15	33
4	Deportivo Portugués	28	10	8	10	37	36	+1	28
5	Valencia	28	8	11	9	26	27	−1	27
6	Universitarios de Oriente	27	8	9	10	26	38	−12	25
7	Deportivo Italia	28	5	13	10	35	41	−6	23
8	San Cristóbal	28	6	5	17	23	46	−23	17

=== Final Stage ===
Pos	Team	Pld	W	D	L	GF	GA	GD	Pts
1	Portuguesa	6	4	1	1	13	4	+9	9
2	Estudiantes de Mérida	6	2	2	2	6	4	+2	6
3	Deportivo Galicia	6	3	0	3	4	7	−3	6
4	Deportivo Portugués	6	1	1	4	3	11	−8	3
