= 1983 Venezuelan Primera División season =

Venezuelan Primera División
- Season: 1983
- Champions: Universidad de Los Andes (1st title)

The 1983 season of the Venezuelan Primera División, the top category of Venezuelan football, was played by 10 teams. The national champions were Universidad de Los Andes.

== Results ==
=== Standings ===
Pos	Team	Pld	W	D	L	GF	GA	GD	Pts
1	Universidad de Los Andes	18	9	7	2	22	12	+10	25
2	Portuguesa	18	7	10	1	27	14	+13	24
3	Deportivo Italia	18	8	8	2	26	14	+12	24
4	Deportivo Lara FC	18	8	5	5	16	14	+2	21
5	Atlético Zamora	18	6	8	4	28	20	+8	20
6	San Cristóbal	17	5	6	6	19	15	+4	16
7	Deportivo Táchira	18	4	7	7	22	25	−3	15
8	Estudiantes de Mérida	17	3	8	6	14	21	−7	14
9	Petroleros del Zulia	18	4	5	9	10	25	−15	13
10	Mineros de Guayana	18	1	4	13	15	39	−24	6
