= 1981 Venezuelan Primera División season =

Venezuelan Primera División
- Season: 1981
- Champions: Deportivo Táchira (2nd title)

The 1981 season of the Venezuelan Primera División, the top category of Venezuelan football, was played by 12 teams. The national champions were Deportivo Táchira.

== Results ==
=== First stage ===
Pos	Team	Pld	W	D	L	GF	GA	GD	Pts
1	Deportivo Lara FC	22	11	10	1	28	11	+17	32
2	Estudiantes de Mérida	22	12	8	2	27	11	+16	32
3	Valencia	22	12	5	5	24	17	+7	29
4	Universidad de Los Andes	22	8	12	2	28	13	+15	28
5	Deportivo Táchira	22	9	7	6	22	14	+8	25
6	Deportivo Galicia	22	7	11	4	28	22	+6	25
7	Atlético Zamora	22	6	12	4	24	18	+6	24
8	Portuguesa	22	8	8	6	24	22	+2	24
9	Deportivo Italia	22	6	3	13	21	30	−9	15
10	Deportivo Portugués	22	3	6	13	22	36	−14	12
11	Atlético Falcón	22	0	11	11	9	27	−18	11
12	Falcón FC	22	2	3	17	12	48	−36	7

=== Semifinals ===
==== Group A ====
Pos	Team	Pld	W	D	L	GF	GA	GD	Pts
1	Estudiantes de Mérida	6	3	2	1	11	7	+4	8
2	Portuguesa	6	2	3	1	5	3	+2	7
3	Deportivo Lara FC	6	2	2	2	10	6	+4	6
4	Atlético Zamora	6	0	3	3	3	13	−10	3

==== Group B ====
Pos	Team	Pld	W	D	L	GF	GA	GD	Pts
1	Deportivo Táchira	6	3	2	1	5	4	+1	8
2	Valencia	5	2	3	0	5	2	+3	7
3	Universidad de Los Andes	6	1	2	3	2	5	−3	4
4	Deportivo Galicia	5	1	1	3	3	4	−1	3

=== Final Stage ===
Pos	Team	Pld	W	D	L	GF	GA	GD	Pts
1	Deportivo Táchira	6	4	1	1	8	3	+5	9
2	Estudiantes de Mérida	6	3	0	3	4	4	0	6
3	Valencia	6	2	2	2	5	6	−1	6
4	Portuguesa	6	1	1	4	2	6	−4	3
