= 1985 Venezuelan Primera División season =

Venezuelan Primera División
- Season: 1985
- Champions: Estudiantes de Mérida (2nd title)

The 1985 season of the Venezuelan Primera División, the top category of Venezuelan football, was played by 10 teams. The national champions were Estudiantes de Mérida.

== Results ==
=== First stage ===
Pos	Team	Pld	W	D	L	GF	GA	GD	Pts
1	Deportivo Táchira	18	10	2	6	26	12	+14	22
2	Atlético Zamora	18	8	6	4	22	10	+12	22
3	San Cristóbal	18	8	6	4	23	14	+9	22
4	Nacional Carabobo	18	8	6	4	19	14	+5	22
5	Estudiantes de Mérida	18	6	8	4	20	16	+4	20
6	Mineros de Guayana	18	8	4	6	12	13	−1	20
7	Portuguesa	18	6	6	6	25	23	+2	18
8	Deportivo Italia	18	3	7	8	14	27	−13	13
9	Caracas	18	2	7	9	11	23	−12	11
10	Universidad Central	18	3	4	11	11	31	−20	10

=== Final Stage ===
Pos	Team	Pld	W	D	L	GF	GA	GD	Pts
1	Estudiantes	10	5	3	2	21	13	+8	13
2	Deportivo Táchira	10	5	3	2	14	13	+1	13
3	Nacional Carabobo	10	5	2	3	13	10	+3	12
4	San Cristóbal	10	3	2	5	6	8	−2	8
5	Atlético Zamora	10	3	2	5	13	17	−4	8
6	Mineros de Guayana	10	1	4	5	9	15	−6	6
