= 1976 Venezuelan Primera División season =

Football season in Venezuela

Venezuelan Primera División
- Season: 1976
- Champions: Portuguesa (3rd title)

The 1976 season of the Venezuelan Primera División, the top category of Venezuelan football, was played by 8 teams. The national champions were Portuguesa.

== Results ==
=== First stage ===
Pos	Team	Pld	W	D	L	GF	GA	GD	Pts
1	Portuguesa	28	16	7	5	53	25	+28	39
2	Deportivo Portugués	28	13	7	8	46	36	+10	33
3	Estudiantes de Mérida	28	9	10	9	31	27	+4	28
4	Deportivo Galicia	28	9	10	9	29	33	−4	28
5	Deportivo Italia	28	7	13	8	30	30	0	27
6	San Cristóbal	28	7	12	9	30	30	0	26
7	Valencia	28	9	5	14	36	43	−7	23
8	Universitarios de Oriente	28	5	10	13	20	51	−31	20

=== Final Stage ===
Pos	Team	Pld	W	D	L	GF	GA	GD	Pts
1	Portuguesa	6	5	1	0	13	3	+10	11
2	Estudiantes de Mérida	6	2	2	2	5	5	0	6
3	Deportivo Portugués	6	1	3	2	6	8	−2	5
4	Deportivo Galicia	6	1	0	5	2	10	−8	2
