= 2002–03 Venezuelan Primera División season =

Venezuelan Primera División
- Season: 2002–03
- Champions: Caracas (6th title)

The 2002–03 season of the Venezuelan Primera División, the top category of Venezuelan football, was played by 10 teams. The national champions were Caracas.

== Torneo Apertura ==
Pos	Team	Pld	W	D	L	GF	GA	GD	Pts
1	Caracas	18	10	5	3	33	18	+15	35
2	Deportivo Italchacao	18	8	7	3	29	18	+11	31
3	Carabobo	18	8	6	4	22	18	+4	30
4	Monagas	18	8	2	8	26	24	+2	26
5	Deportivo Táchira	18	6	6	6	24	25	−1	24
6	Unión Atlético Maracaibo	18	5	8	5	21	24	−3	23
7	Estudiantes de Mérida	18	5	7	6	19	24	−5	22
8	Nacional Táchira	18	6	3	9	16	23	−7	21
9	Mineros de Guayana	18	4	6	8	19	23	−4	18
10	Trujillanos	18	4	2	12	23	35	−12	14

== Torneo Clausura ==
Pos	Team	Pld	W	D	L	GF	GA	GD	Pts
1	Unión Atlético Maracaibo	16	8	7	1	21	9	+12	31
2	Deportivo Italchacao	16	8	6	2	32	20	+12	30
3	Trujillanos	16	6	7	3	17	15	+2	25
4	Caracas	16	5	7	4	18	13	+5	22
5	Estudiantes de Mérida	16	6	4	6	23	22	+1	22
6	Deportivo Táchira	16	4	7	5	13	16	−3	19
7	Monagas	16	5	4	7	17	22	−5	19
8	Mineros de Guayana	16	3	4	9	16	24	−8	13
9	Carabobo	16	1	6	9	9	25	−16	9
10	Nacional Táchira	0	0	0	0	0	0	0	0

== Final Playoff ==
May 28, 2003

Unión Atlético Maracaibo	1–1	Caracas

June 1, 2003

Caracas	3–0	Unión Atlético Maracaibo

== Promotion/relegation playoff ==
May 28, 2003

Unión Lara	2–2	Mineros de Guayana

June 1, 2003

Mineros de Guayana	2–0	Unión Lara
