= Pedro Febles =

Venezuelan footballer (1958–2011)

Personal information
- Full name: Pedro Juan Febles González
- Date of birth: 18 April 1958
- Place of birth: Caracas, Venezuela
- Date of death: 14 December 2011 (aged 53)
- Place of death: Venezuela
- Height: 5 ft 10 in (1.78 m)
- Position: Striker

Senior career*
Years	Team	Apps	(Gls)
1979–1980	Deportivo Italia		
1980–1983	Deportivo Galicia		
1983–1985	Atlético San Cristóbal		
1985–1989	Marítimo Caracas		

International career
1979–1989	Venezuela	25	(5)
- * Club domestic league appearances and goals

Pedro Juan Febles González (18 April 1958 – 14 December 2011) was a Venezuelan football player and manager.

== Club career ==
Febles played for Deportivo Galicia, Atlético San Cristóbal and C.S. Marítimo de Venezuela.

== International career ==
Febles made 25 appearances for the senior Venezuela national football team from 1979 to 1989, including participation in the 1979 Copa América, 1983 Copa América and 1989 Copa América.

He also competed for Venezuela at the 1980 Summer Olympics in Moscow, Soviet Union, where the team was eliminated after the preliminary round.

== Manager ==
Febles was a successful coach for Caracas FC winning the league during the 87–88 season. He also coached Deportivo Italia and the Venezuela National Team under-14 with Augusto Visa as an assistant coach. Many of his player from that National Team went on to play professional in the Venezuelan League, some of them such as: Alejandro Iglesias, Arnold Rivera, Pablo Rosas, Edwin Quilaguri, Pedro Millan and German Yumar.

== Personal ==
Febles died at age 52 on 14 December 2011.
