= 1996–97 Venezuelan Primera División season =

Venezuelan Primera División
- Season: 1996–97
- Champions: Caracas (4th title)

The 1996–97 season of the Venezuelan Primera División, the top category of Venezuelan football, was played by 12 teams. The national champions were Caracas.

== Torneo Apertura ==
=== Standings ===
Pos	Team	Pld	W	D	L	GF	GA	GD	Pts
1	Minervén	22	13	4	5	33	15	+18	43
2	Atlético Zulia	22	13	4	5	31	20	+11	43
3	Unión Atlético Táchira	22	12	5	5	35	19	+16	41
4	Caracas	22	11	5	6	28	20	+8	38
5	Mineros de Guayana	22	11	5	6	31	24	+7	38
6	Estudiantes de Mérida	22	9	4	9	21	23	−2	31
7	Trujillanos	22	7	9	6	25	20	+5	30
8	Deportivo Italia	22	8	4	10	28	32	−4	28
9	Llaneros	22	5	7	10	22	32	−10	22
10	Atlético El Vigía	22	5	6	11	17	26	−9	21
11	Valencia	22	4	6	12	15	29	−14	18
12	Nacional Táchira	22	3	3	16	15	40	−25	12

=== Apertura Playoff ===
December 22, 1996

Minervén	1–0	Atlético Zulia

May 26, 1997

Atlético Zulia	1–0	Minervén
Penalties
	4–2

== Torneo Clausura ==
=== Standings ===
Pos	Team	Pld	W	D	L	GF	GA	GD	Pts
1	Caracas	18	11	3	4	36	18	+18	36
2	Unión Atlético Táchira	18	10	5	3	32	18	+14	35
3	Estudiantes de Mérida	18	8	5	5	21	14	+7	29
4	Trujillanos	18	6	7	5	19	17	+2	25
5	Mineros de Guayana	18	7	4	7	30	29	+1	25
6	Atlético Zulia	18	5	9	4	28	28	0	24
7	Minervén	18	6	5	7	20	19	+1	23
8	Deportivo Italia	18	6	5	7	20	28	−8	23
9	Llaneros	18	4	9	5	23	25	−2	21
10	Atlético El Vigía	18	0	2	16	7	40	−33	2

== Championship playoff ==
May 21, 1997

Atlético Zulia	1–3	Caracas

May 26, 1997

Caracas	5–0	Atlético Zulia
