= 1990–91 Venezuelan Primera División season =

Venezuelan Primera División
- Season: 1990–91
- Champions: Universidad de Los Andes (2nd title)

The 1990–91 season of the Venezuelan Primera División, the top category of Venezuelan football, was played by 16 teams. The national champions were Universidad de Los Andes.

== Results ==
=== Standings ===
Pos	Team	Pld	W	D	L	GF	GA	GD	Pts
1	Universidad de Los Andes	30	13	13	4	38	28	+10	39
2	Marítimo	30	14	9	7	46	23	+23	37
3	Atlético Zamora	30	13	10	7	44	26	+18	36
4	Mineros de Guayana	30	15	4	11	43	30	+13	34
5	Unión Atlético Táchira	30	12	9	9	37	27	+10	33
6	Caracas	30	11	11	8	36	34	+2	33
7	Unión Deportivo Lara	30	11	10	9	36	29	+7	32
8	Deportivo Italia	30	10	10	10	27	29	−2	30
9	Minervén	30	9	12	9	27	21	+6	30
10	Trujillanos	30	12	5	13	27	34	−7	29
11	Estudiantes de Mérida	30	9	11	10	27	31	−4	29
12	Monagas	30	9	11	10	33	39	−6	29
13	Portuguesa	30	9	7	14	27	41	−14	25
14	Anzoátegui FC	30	10	5	15	27	41	−14	25
15	Maracaibo FC	30	9	2	19	28	43	−15	20
16	Valencia	30	9	1	20	33	60	−27	19
