= 1995–96 Venezuelan Primera División season =

Venezuelan Primera División
- Season: 1995–96
- Champions: Minervén (1st title)

The 1995–96 season of the Venezuelan Primera División, the top category of Venezuelan football, was played by 12 teams. The national champions were Minervén.

== Torneo Apertura ==
=== Group Oriental ===
| Pos | Team | Pld | W | D | L | GF | GA | GD | Pts | Qualification |
|---|---|---|---|---|---|---|---|---|---|---|
| 1 | Caracas | 16 | 11 | 3 | 2 | 42 | 13 | +29 | 36 | Qualification for Final and Torneo Clausura |
| 2 | Deportivo Italia | 16 | 9 | 4 | 3 | 21 | 11 | +10 | 31 | Qualification for Torneo Clausura |
| 3 | Minervén | 16 | 8 | 3 | 5 | 30 | 17 | +13 | 27 | Qualification for Torneo Clausura |
| 4 | Anzoátegui FC | 16 | 6 | 5 | 5 | 20 | 24 | −4 | 23 | Qualification for Torneo Clausura |
| 5 | Valencia | 16 | 5 | 7 | 4 | 24 | 24 | 0 | 22 | Qualification for Torneo Clausura |
| 6 | Mineros de Guayana | 16 | 5 | 5 | 6 | 21 | 18 | +3 | 20 | Qualification for Torneo Clausura |
| 7 | Monagas | 16 | 3 | 7 | 6 | 16 | 20 | −4 | 16 | |
| 8 | Marinos de Sucre | 16 | 3 | 3 | 10 | 12 | 30 | −18 | 12 | |
| 9 | Deportivo Tuy | 16 | 3 | 1 | 12 | 24 | 53 | −29 | 10 | |

=== Group Occidental ===
| Pos | Team | Pld | W | D | L | GF | GA | GD | Pts | Qualification |
|---|---|---|---|---|---|---|---|---|---|---|
| 1 | Universidad de Los Andes | 16 | 7 | 6 | 3 | 31 | 23 | +8 | 27 | Qualification for Final and Torneo Clausura |
| 2 | UNICOL | 16 | 8 | 2 | 6 | 26 | 20 | +6 | 26 | Qualification for Torneo Clausura |
| 3 | Trujillanos | 16 | 7 | 5 | 4 | 19 | 19 | 0 | 26 | Qualification for Torneo Clausura |
| 4 | Unión Atlético Táchira | 16 | 6 | 7 | 3 | 24 | 15 | +9 | 25 | Qualification for Torneo Clausura |
| 5 | Estudiantes de Mérida | 16 | 6 | 5 | 5 | 26 | 19 | +7 | 23 | Qualification for Torneo Clausura |
| 6 | Atlético El Vigía | 16 | 6 | 5 | 5 | 20 | 30 | −10 | 23 | Qualification for Torneo Clausura |
| 7 | Llaneros | 16 | 6 | 3 | 7 | 30 | 30 | 0 | 21 | |
| 8 | Unión Deportivo Lara | 16 | 2 | 6 | 8 | 16 | 26 | −10 | 12 | |
| 9 | Atlético Zamora | 16 | 2 | 5 | 9 | 11 | 28 | −17 | 11 | |

Final

| Team 1 | Agg. | Team 2 | 1st leg | 2nd leg |
|---|---|---|---|---|
| Universidad de Los Andes | 6–3 | Caracas | 2–0 | 4–3 |

== Torneo Clausura ==
=== Group A ===
| Pos | Team | Pld | W | D | L | GF | GA | GD | Pts |
|---|---|---|---|---|---|---|---|---|---|
| 1 | Mineros de Guayana | 10 | 6 | 2 | 2 | 21 | 12 | +9 | 20 |
| 2 | Trujillanos | 10 | 6 | 1 | 3 | 17 | 14 | +3 | 19 |
| 3 | Caracas | 10 | 3 | 5 | 2 | 17 | 14 | +3 | 14 |
| 4 | Estudiantes de Mérida | 10 | 5 | 1 | 4 | 19 | 18 | +1 | 13 |
| 5 | UNICOL | 10 | 1 | 5 | 4 | 14 | 17 | −3 | 8 |
| 6 | Anzoátegui FC | 10 | 1 | 2 | 7 | 8 | 21 | −13 | 5 |

=== Group B ===
| Pos | Team | Pld | W | D | L | GF | GA | GD | Pts |
|---|---|---|---|---|---|---|---|---|---|
| 1 | Minervén | 10 | 4 | 3 | 3 | 18 | 10 | +8 | 15 |
| 2 | Deportivo Italia | 10 | 4 | 3 | 3 | 9 | 11 | −2 | 15 |
| 3 | Unión Atlético Táchira | 10 | 3 | 5 | 2 | 9 | 8 | +1 | 14 |
| 4 | Atlético El Vigía | 10 | 2 | 5 | 3 | 7 | 12 | −5 | 11 |
| 5 | Valencia | 10 | 2 | 7 | 1 | 12 | 13 | −1 | 10 |
| 6 | Universidad de Los Andes | 10 | 2 | 3 | 5 | 12 | 13 | −1 | 9 |

== Final Stage ==
| Pos | Team | Pld | W | D | L | GF | GA | GD | Pts |
|---|---|---|---|---|---|---|---|---|---|
| 1 | Minervén | 10 | 7 | 1 | 2 | 20 | 12 | +8 | 22 |
| 2 | Mineros de Guayana | 10 | 6 | 2 | 2 | 21 | 12 | +9 | 20 |
| 3 | Caracas | 10 | 6 | 1 | 3 | 20 | 14 | +6 | 19 |
| 4 | Unión Atlético Táchira | 10 | 4 | 3 | 3 | 14 | 9 | +5 | 15 |
| 5 | Deportivo Italia | 10 | 0 | 4 | 6 | 11 | 27 | −16 | 4 |
| 6 | Trujillanos | 10 | 0 | 3 | 7 | 12 | 24 | −12 | 3 |
