= 2004–05 Venezuelan Primera División season =

Venezuelan Primera División
- Season: 2004–05
- Champions: Unión Atlético Maracaibo (1st title)

The 2004–05 season of the Venezuelan Primera División, the top category of Venezuelan football, was played by 10 teams. The national champions were Unión Atlético Maracaibo.

== Torneo Apertura ==
| Pos | Team | Pld | W | D | L | GF | GA | GD | Pts |
|---|---|---|---|---|---|---|---|---|---|
| 1 | Unión Atlético Maracaibo | 18 | 9 | 7 | 2 | 27 | 12 | +15 | 34 |
| 2 | Caracas | 18 | 9 | 5 | 4 | 23 | 19 | +4 | 32 |
| 3 | Mineros de Guayana | 18 | 8 | 6 | 4 | 28 | 18 | +10 | 30 |
| 4 | Deportivo Táchira | 18 | 9 | 3 | 6 | 23 | 19 | +4 | 30 |
| 5 | Trujillanos | 18 | 8 | 5 | 5 | 21 | 16 | +5 | 29 |
| 6 | Carabobo | 18 | 4 | 9 | 5 | 23 | 25 | −2 | 21 |
| 7 | Monagas | 18 | 5 | 4 | 9 | 21 | 27 | −6 | 19 |
| 8 | Estudiantes de Mérida | 18 | 4 | 5 | 9 | 24 | 31 | −7 | 17 |
| 9 | Deportivo Italmaracaibo | 18 | 4 | 5 | 9 | 18 | 30 | −12 | 17 |
| 10 | Deportivo Italchacao | 18 | 3 | 5 | 10 | 22 | 33 | −11 | 14 |

== Torneo Clausura ==
| Pos | Team | Pld | W | D | L | GF | GA | GD | Pts |
|---|---|---|---|---|---|---|---|---|---|
| 1 | Unión Atlético Maracaibo | 18 | 12 | 3 | 3 | 30 | 12 | +18 | 39 |
| 2 | Caracas | 18 | 9 | 6 | 3 | 28 | 14 | +14 | 33 |
| 3 | Deportivo Táchira | 18 | 9 | 5 | 4 | 25 | 20 | +5 | 32 |
| 4 | Estudiantes de Mérida | 18 | 6 | 7 | 5 | 18 | 19 | −1 | 25 |
| 5 | Monagas | 18 | 6 | 5 | 7 | 26 | 36 | −10 | 23 |
| 6 | Mineros de Guayana | 18 | 5 | 6 | 7 | 22 | 23 | −1 | 21 |
| 7 | Carabobo | 18 | 4 | 9 | 5 | 21 | 22 | −1 | 21 |
| 8 | Deportivo Italmaracaibo | 18 | 4 | 5 | 9 | 19 | 26 | −7 | 17 |
| 9 | Trujillanos | 18 | 4 | 5 | 9 | 21 | 29 | −8 | 17 |
| 10 | Deportivo Italchacao | 18 | 2 | 7 | 9 | 20 | 29 | −9 | 13 |

== Promotion/relegation playoff ==
May 22, 2005

| Deportivo Italmaracaibo | 0–0 | Deportivo Maracaibo |

May 29, 2005

| Deportivo Maracaibo | 1–1 | Deportivo Italmaracaibo |
