= 1961 Venezuelan Primera División season =

Venezuelan Primera División
- Season: 1961
- Champions: Deportivo Italia (1st title)

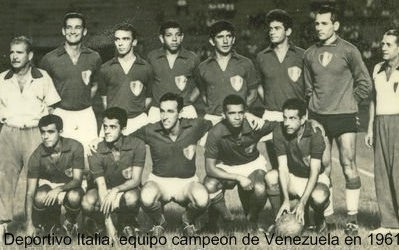
Deportivo Italia, Venezuela's champion team in 1961

The 1961 season of the Venezuelan Primera División, the top category of Venezuelan football, was played by 5 teams. The national champions were Deportivo Italia.

== Results ==
=== Standings ===
Pos	Team	Pld	W	D	L	GF	GA	GD	Pts
1	Deportivo Italia	16	10	4	2	29	11	+18	24
2	Banco Agricola y Pecuario	15	9	1	5	33	27	+6	19
3	Banco Francés e Italiano	16	7	2	7	33	36	−3	16
4	Deportivo Portugués	16	5	3	8	23	25	−2	13
5	Universidad Católica	15	2	2	11	21	40	−19	6
