= 1998–99 Venezuelan Primera División season =

Venezuelan Primera División
- Season: 1998–99
- Champions: Deportivo Italchacao (5th title)

The 1998–99 season of the Venezuelan Primera División, the top category of Venezuelan football, was played by 12 teams. The national champions were Deportivo Italchacao.

== Torneo Apertura ==
Pos	Team	Pld	W	D	L	GF	GA	GD	Pts
1	Unión Atlético Táchira	22	15	5	2	42	21	+21	50
2	Estudiantes de Mérida	22	13	5	4	38	22	+16	44
3	Caracas	22	10	5	7	30	24	+6	35
4	Universidad de Los Andes	22	10	4	8	35	22	+13	34
5	Internacional de Lara	22	10	4	8	24	17	+7	34
6	Carabobo	22	8	6	8	22	24	−2	30
7	Nacional Táchira	22	7	7	8	30	27	+3	28
8	Deportivo Italchacao	22	8	4	10	24	28	−4	28
9	Nueva Cádiz	22	7	6	9	26	30	−4	27
10	Atlético Zamora	22	4	8	10	26	36	−10	20
11	Mineros de Guayana	22	5	5	12	30	42	−12	20
12	Minervén	22	4	3	15	14	41	−27	15

== Torneo Clausura ==
Pos	Team	Pld	W	D	L	GF	GA	GD	Pts
1	Deportivo Italchacao	18	10	6	2	28	13	+15	36
2	Estudiantes de Mérida	18	9	7	2	26	13	+13	34
3	Universidad de Los Andes	18	8	4	6	31	28	+3	28
4	Zulianos	18	5	7	6	34	33	+1	22
5	Internacional de Lara	18	6	4	8	25	25	0	22
6	Mineros de Guayana	18	5	7	6	32	36	−4	22
7	Nacional Táchira	18	5	6	7	19	29	−10	21
8	Caracas	18	4	8	6	20	22	−2	20
9	Carabobo	18	4	6	8	17	23	−6	18
10	Unión Atlético Táchira	18	3	7	8	18	28	−10	16

== Final Playoff ==
May 30, 1999

Deportivo Italchacao	5–1	Unión Atlético Táchira

June 6, 1999

Unión Atlético Táchira	1–2	Deportivo Italchacao
