= 1991–92 Venezuelan Primera División season =

Season of the Venezuelan Premier League

Venezuelan Primera División
- Season: 1991–92
- Champions: Caracas (1st title)

The 1991–92 season of the Venezuelan Primera División, the top category of Venezuelan football, was played by 16 teams. The national champions were Caracas.

== Results ==
=== Standings ===
Pos	Team	Pld	W	D	L	GF	GA	GD	Pts
1	Caracas	30	17	9	4	59	25	+34	43
2	Minervén	30	15	12	3	43	16	+27	42
3	Marítimo	30	13	13	4	46	21	+25	39
4	Unión Atlético Táchira	30	15	8	7	45	23	+22	38
5	Trujillanos	30	15	7	8	43	29	+14	37
6	Universidad de Los Andes	30	14	8	8	40	28	+12	36
7	Mineros de Guayana	30	12	10	8	43	34	+9	34
8	Anzoátegui FC	30	9	12	9	43	36	+7	30
9	Monagas	30	11	8	11	34	35	−1	30
10	Unión Deportivo Lara	30	9	9	12	34	37	−3	27
11	Atlético Zamora	30	9	9	12	34	34	0	27
12	Portuguesa	30	9	8	13	30	41	−11	26
13	Deportivo Italia	30	7	8	15	28	45	−17	22
14	Estudiantes de Mérida	30	5	11	14	28	42	−14	21
15	Industriales de Caroní	30	5	7	18	23	67	−44	17
16	Salineros de Araya	30	1	8	21	25	85	−60	10
