= 1986 Venezuelan Primera División season =

Venezuelan Primera División
- Season: 1986
- Champions: Unión Atlético Táchira (4th title)

The 1986 season of the Venezuelan Primera División, the top category of Venezuelan football, was played by 11 teams. The national champions were Unión Atlético Táchira.

== Results ==
=== Oriental Group ===
Pos	Team	Pld	W	D	L	GF	GA	GD	Pts
1	Deportivo Italia	10	7	2	1	15	3	+12	16
2	Marítimo	10	4	4	2	6	6	0	12
3	Caracas	10	4	3	3	13	6	+7	11
4	Mineros de Guayana	10	3	4	3	9	8	+1	10
5	Atlético Anzoátegui	10	3	3	4	5	10	−5	9
6	Universidad Central	10	0	2	8	2	17	−15	2

=== Occidental Group ===
Pos	Team	Pld	W	D	L	GF	GA	GD	Pts
1	Unión Atlético Táchira	8	5	1	2	13	7	+6	11
2	Estudiantes de Mérida	8	3	3	2	11	7	+4	9
3	Portuguesa	8	3	2	3	10	9	+1	8
4	Atlético Zamora	8	3	2	3	4	7	−3	8
5	Unión Española	8	2	0	6	8	16	−8	4

=== Final Stage ===
Pos	Team	Pld	W	D	L	GF	GA	GD	Pts
1	Unión Atlético Táchira	10	6	3	1	18	7	+11	15
2	Estudiantes de Mérida	10	6	2	2	12	6	+6	14
3	Marítimo	10	3	5	2	8	6	+2	11
4	Deportivo Italia	10	2	5	3	6	10	−4	9
5	Portuguesa	10	2	3	5	7	13	−6	7
6	Caracas	10	1	2	7	8	17	−9	4
