= Venzóleo =

Venezuelan football club

- Full name: Venzóleo
- Founded: 1922; 104 years ago
- Dissolved: 1928
- Ground: Estadio Olímpico de la UCV; Caracas, Venezuela
- Capacity: 30,000
- League: Primera División Venezolana

Venzóleo was a professional association football club which won one First Division title in the amateur era. The club was based in Caracas.

== Honours ==
- Primera División Venezolana: 1

Winners (1): 1927
Runner-up (2): 1925, 1926
