= 2005–06 Venezuelan Primera División season =

Venezuelan Primera División
- Season: 2005–06
- Champions: Caracas (8th title)

The 2005–06 season of the Venezuelan Primera División, the top category of Venezuelan football, was played by 10 teams. The national champions were Caracas.

== Torneo Apertura ==
Pos	Team	Pld	W	D	L	GF	GA	GD	Pts
1	Unión Atlético Maracaibo	18	12	5	1	28	11	+17	41
2	Deportivo Táchira	18	9	4	5	32	23	+9	31
3	Mineros de Guayana	18	7	6	5	24	19	+5	27
4	Carabobo	18	7	6	5	28	24	+4	27
5	Caracas	18	7	3	8	28	25	+3	24
6	Deportivo Italmaracaibo	18	6	6	6	23	22	+1	24
7	Aragua	18	6	4	8	16	27	−11	22
8	Trujillanos	18	4	6	8	14	24	−10	18
9	Estudiantes de Mérida	18	3	6	9	21	30	−9	15
10	Monagas	18	3	6	9	19	28	−9	15

== Torneo Clausura ==
Pos	Team	Pld	W	D	L	GF	GA	GD	Pts
1	Caracas	18	10	6	2	29	14	+15	36
2	Deportivo Táchira	17	7	7	3	25	21	+4	28
3	Carabobo	18	7	6	5	26	22	+4	27
4	Mineros de Guayana	18	7	6	5	21	22	−1	27
5	Monagas	18	5	10	3	21	15	+6	25
6	Aragua	18	7	4	7	21	21	0	25
7	Unión Atlético Maracaibo	18	3	11	4	21	20	+1	20
8	Deportivo Italmaracaibo	18	1	7	10	18	32	−14	10
9	Estudiantes de Mérida	18	5	3	10	27	33	−6	18
10	Trujillanos	18	3	8	7	18	27	−9	17

== Final Playoff ==
May 17, 2006

Unión Atlético Maracaibo	1–1	Caracas

May 21, 2006

Caracas	3–0	Unión Atlético Maracaibo
