= 2001–02 Venezuelan Primera División season =

Venezuelan Primera División
- Season: 2001–02
- Champions: Nacional Táchira (1st title)

The 2001–02 season of the Venezuelan Primera División, the top category of Venezuelan football, was played by 10 teams. The national champions were Nacional Táchira.

== Torneo Apertura ==
Pos	Team	Pld	W	D	L	GF	GA	GD	Pts
1	Estudiantes de Mérida	18	9	6	3	34	19	+15	33
2	Monagas	18	9	4	5	24	17	+7	31
3	Deportivo Táchira	18	7	8	3	28	17	+11	29
4	Nacional Táchira	18	7	7	4	27	18	+9	28
5	Mineros de Guayana	18	8	4	6	27	29	−2	28
6	Caracas	18	6	6	6	32	23	+9	24
7	Trujillanos	18	4	10	4	28	27	+1	22
8	Deportivo Italchacao	18	6	3	9	23	25	−2	21
9	Portuguesa	18	4	4	10	17	39	−22	16
10	Deportivo Galicia	18	3	2	13	18	44	−26	11

== Torneo Clausura ==
Pos	Team	Pld	W	D	L	GF	GA	GD	Pts
1	Nacional Táchira	18	11	3	4	37	18	+19	36
2	Monagas	18	9	6	3	29	17	+12	33
3	Deportivo Italchacao	18	8	5	5	30	22	+8	29
4	Deportivo Táchira	18	7	6	5	26	22	+4	27
5	Caracas	18	7	5	6	35	28	+7	26
6	Trujillanos	18	6	6	6	25	20	+5	24
7	Estudiantes de Mérida	18	6	6	6	24	22	+2	24
8	Deportivo Galicia	18	4	4	10	18	36	−18	16
9	Mineros de Guayana	18	3	6	9	17	34	−17	15
10	Portuguesa	18	3	5	10	27	49	−22	14

== Final Playoff ==
May 19, 2002

Nacional Táchira	3–3	Estudiantes de Mérida

May 26, 2002

Estudiantes de Mérida	0–0	Nacional Táchira
Penalties
	3–5
