= 1999–2000 Venezuelan Primera División season =

Venezuelan Primera División
- Season: 1999–2000
- Champions: Deportivo Táchira (5th title)

The 1999–2000 season of the Venezuelan Primera División, the top category of Venezuelan football, was played by 12 teams. The national champions were Deportivo Táchira.

== Torneo Apertura ==
Pos	Team	Pld	W	D	L	GF	GA	GD	Pts
1	Deportivo Táchira	22	13	7	2	36	19	+17	46
2	Estudiantes de Mérida	22	13	4	5	50	24	+26	43
3	Deportivo Italchacao	22	11	8	3	32	18	+14	41
4	Caracas	22	9	8	5	41	33	+8	35
5	Mineros de Guayana	22	8	6	8	31	33	−2	30
6	Trujillanos	22	7	8	7	31	28	+3	29
7	Zulianos	22	7	7	8	35	27	+8	28
8	Universidad de Los Andes	22	7	6	9	34	37	−3	27
9	Nacional Táchira	22	5	7	10	19	36	−17	22
10	El Vigía	22	6	4	12	32	51	−19	22
11	Carabobo	22	4	7	11	23	41	−18	19
12	Llaneros	22	2	9	11	28	45	−17	15

== Torneo Clausura ==
Pos	Team	Pld	W	D	L	GF	GA	GD	Pts
1	Deportivo Táchira	22	14	6	2	40	13	+27	48
2	Deportivo Italchacao	22	13	4	5	35	18	+17	43
3	Caracas	22	12	6	4	38	19	+19	42
4	Carabobo	21	10	6	5	24	15	+9	36
5	Estudiantes de Mérida	22	10	4	8	30	29	+1	34
6	Universidad de Los Andes	22	9	2	11	28	26	+2	29
7	Mineros de Guayana	22	7	4	11	26	33	−7	25
8	Zulianos	21	5	8	8	24	33	−9	23
9	El Vigía	22	5	6	11	25	36	−11	21
10	Llaneros	22	5	6	11	25	45	−20	21
11	Nacional Táchira	22	4	8	10	17	31	−14	20
12	Trujillanos	22	4	6	12	21	35	−14	18

== Final stage ==
Pos	Team	Pld	W	D	L	GF	GA	GD	Pts
1	Deportivo Táchira	6	4	1	1	7	3	+4	15
2	Deportivo Italchacao	6	1	4	1	4	4	0	7
3	Estudiantes de Mérida	6	1	3	2	5	6	−1	6
4	Caracas	6	0	4	2	5	8	−3	4
