= 1993–94 Venezuelan Primera División season =

Venezuelan Primera División
- Season: 1993–94
- Champions: Caracas (2nd title)

The 1993–94 Venezuelan Primera División season was the 74th edition in the top category of Venezuelan football, played by 16 teams and won by Caracas.

== Standings ==
| Pos | Team | Pld | W | D | L | GF | GA | GD | Pts |
|---|---|---|---|---|---|---|---|---|---|
| 1 | Caracas | 30 | 15 | 11 | 4 | 43 | 24 | +19 | 43 |
| 2 | Trujillanos | 30 | 14 | 11 | 5 | 53 | 29 | +24 | 40.25 |
| 3 | Minervén | 30 | 15 | 8 | 7 | 53 | 34 | +19 | 39.75 |
| 4 | Unión Atlético Táchira | 30 | 12 | 10 | 8 | 41 | 30 | +11 | 35.5 |
| 5 | Mineros de Guayana | 30 | 12 | 10 | 8 | 48 | 34 | +14 | 34 |
| 6 | Deportivo Italia | 30 | 12 | 8 | 10 | 43 | 37 | +6 | 32 |
| 7 | Estudiantes de Mérida | 30 | 12 | 8 | 10 | 43 | 41 | +2 | 32 |
| 8 | Marítimo | 30 | 12 | 5 | 13 | 44 | 37 | +7 | 29 |
| 9 | Llaneros | 30 | 9 | 11 | 10 | 31 | 31 | 0 | 29 |
| 10 | Atlético El Vigía | 30 | 11 | 7 | 12 | 43 | 49 | −6 | 29 |
| 11 | Universidad de Los Andes | 30 | 8 | 12 | 10 | 39 | 47 | −8 | 28 |
| 12 | Monagas | 30 | 9 | 10 | 11 | 39 | 47 | −8 | 28 |
| 13 | Maracaibo FC | 30 | 8 | 10 | 12 | 33 | 56 | −23 | 26 |
| 14 | Valencia | 30 | 10 | 5 | 15 | 24 | 37 | −13 | 25 |
| 15 | Atlético Zamora | 30 | 6 | 12 | 12 | 24 | 35 | −11 | 24 |
| 16 | Anzoátegui FC | 30 | 3 | 6 | 21 | 33 | 66 | −33 | 12 |
