= Centro Atlético S.C. =

Venezuelan football club

Centro Atlético
- Full name: Centro Atlético Sport Club
- Founded: November 27, 1915; 109 years ago
- Ground: Estadio Olímpico de la UCV; Caracas, Venezuela
- Capacity: 30,000
- Chairman: Francisco Borras
- League: Primera División Venezolana

Centro Atlético Sport Club (usually called Centro Atlético) was a Venezuelan professional football club. The club has won four First Division titles in the amateur era. The club is based in Caracas.

== Honours ==
=== National ===
- Primera División Venezolana
  - Winners (4): 1922, 1924, 1926, 1930
