= 1997–98 in Venezuelan football =

The following article presents a summary of the 1997–98 football season in Venezuela.

== Venezuela national team ==
Date	Venue	Opponents	Score	Comp	Venezuela scorers	Fixture
1997-08-20	Estadio La Carolina; Barinas, Venezuela	Peru	0 – 3	WCQ98		149
1997-09-10	Estadio Metropolitano; Barranquilla, Colombia	Colombia	1 – 0	WCQ98		150
1997-10-12	Estadio Defensores del Chaco; Asunción, Paraguay	Paraguay	1 – 0	WCQ98		151
