= Johnny Castellanos =

Venezuelan footballer (born 1957)

Personal information
- Date of birth: 24 December 1957 (age 68)
- Position: Defender

International career
Years	Team	Apps	(Gls)
1979–1983	Venezuela	3	(0)

Johnny Castellanos (born 24 December 1957) is a Venezuelan former footballer. He played in three matches for the Venezuela national football team from 1979 to 1983. He was also part of Venezuela's squad for the 1979 Copa América tournament.
