= 2000–01 in Venezuelan football =

The following article presents a summary of the 2000–2001 football season in Venezuela.

== Venezuela national team ==
Date	Venue	Opponents	Score	Comp	Venezuela scorers	Fixture
2000-08-10	Estadio Alejandro Morera Soto; Alajuela, Costa Rica	Costa Rica	1 - 5	F	Urdaneta 2'; Rey 5'; Urdaneta 25'; De Ornelas 62'; Álvarez 89'	176
2000-08-16	Estadio Nacional; Lima, Peru	Peru	1 - 0	WCQ02		177
2000-09-02	Estadio Defensores del Chaco; Asunción, Paraguay	Paraguay	3 - 0	WCQ02		178
2000-10-08	Estadio José Pachencho Romero; Maracaibo, Venezuela	Brazil	0 - 6	WCQ02		179
2000-11-15	Estadio José Pachencho Romero; Maracaibo, Venezuela	Ecuador	1 - 2	WCQ02	Arango 66'	180
2001-03-28	Estadio Monumental; Buenos Aires, Argentina	Argentina	5 - 0	WCQ02		181
2001-04-19	Estadio Alejandro Morera Soto; Alajuela, Costa Rica	Costa Rica	2 - 2	F	Rondón 61'; Arías 89' (og)	182
2001-04-24	Estadio Pueblo Nuevo; San Cristóbal, Venezuela	Colombia	2 - 2	WCQ02	Rondón 22'; Arango 81'	183
2001-06-01	Estadio Hernando Siles; La Paz, Bolivia	Bolivia	5 - 0	WCQ02		184
2001-07-11	Estadio Metropolitano; Barranquilla, Colombia	Colombia	2 - 0	CA01		185
2001-07-14	Estadio Metropolitano; Barranquilla, Colombia	Chile	1 - 0	CA01		186
2001-07-17	Estadio Metropolitano; Barranquilla, Colombia	Ecuador	4 - 0	CA01		187
