= Rodrigo Soto =

Chilean footballer (born 1980)

Personal information
- Full name: Rodrigo Alejandro Soto Zuñiga
- Date of birth: 30 October 1980 (age 46)
- Place of birth: Santiago, Chile
- Height: 1.78 m (5 ft 10 in)
- Position: Forward

Senior career*
Years	Team	Apps	(Gls)
2002–2003	UNIACC	0	(0)
2004–2005	Unión San Felipe	60	(8)
2006	Curicó Unido	28	(7)
2007	San Luis de Quillota	37	(14)
2008–2009	Coquimbo Unido	67	(20)
2011–2012	San Marcos de Arica	56	(9)
2012–2014	Magallanes	38	(7)
- * Club domestic league appearances and goals as of 28 March 2020

Rodrigo Alejandro Soto Zuñiga (born 30 October 1980) was a Chilean footballer. His last club was Magallanes.
