= Walter Roque =

Uruguayan footballer and coach (1937-2014)

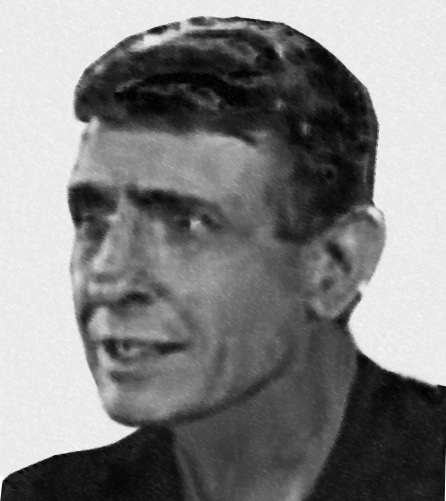

Personal information
- Full name: Walter José Roque Méndez
- Date of birth: 8 May 1937
- Place of birth: Montevideo, Uruguay
- Date of death: 30 December 2014 (aged 77)
- Place of death: Caracas, Venezuela
- Position: Left winger

Senior career*
Years	Team	Apps	(Gls)
1956–1957	Rampla Juniors		
1959–1962	Atlanta	94	(14)
1963	Danubio		
1964–1965	Cúcuta Deportivo		
1966	Deportivo Galicia		

International career
1956–1957	Uruguay	15	(2)

Managerial career
- 1971–1972: Valencia FC
- 1973: Portuguesa
- 1974: Valencia FC
- 1975–1976: Deportivo Galicia
- 1976–1978: Estudiantes de Mérida
- 1978–1979: Venezuela
- 1979: Fénix
- 1979–1981: Venezuela
- 1981–1985: Venezuela
- 1982: Deportivo Táchira
- 1982–1983: Atlético San Cristóbal
- 1985: Sud América
- 1986: Nacional
- 1987: Progreso
- 1988: El Nacional
- 1988: Oriente Petrolero
- 1990: Progreso
- 1992: Peñarol
- 1995–1996: San José
- 1997: Blooming
- 1997: Guabirá
- 1998: Jorge Wilstermann
- 1999–2001: Deportivo Táchira
- 2002: Bolivia U20
- 2003: Bolivia
- 2005: Caracas
- * Club domestic league appearances and goals

Walter José Roque Méndez (8 May 1937 – 30 December 2014) was a Uruguayan football player and coach.

== Career ==
Born in Montevideo, Roque played club football as a left winger for Rampla Juniors, Atlanta, Danubio, Cúcuta Deportivo and Deportivo Galicia. He also earned 15 caps for Uruguay, scoring twice, including appearing in 2 FIFA World Cup qualifying matches.

He later became a football manager, and was in charge of the Venezuela national team between 1978 and 1985, and Bolivia in 2003.

== Career statistics ==
=== International ===
National team	Year	Apps	Goals
Uruguay	1956	5	1
Uruguay	1957	10	1
Total		15	2

== Later life and death ==
He died on 30 December 2014, at the age of 77.
