= Banco Obrero F.C. =

Venezuelan football club

Banco Obrero
- Full name: Banco Obrero Fútbol Club
- Ground: Estadio Olímpico de la UCV; Caracas, Venezuela
- Capacity: 30,000
- League: Primera División Venezolana

Banco Obrero Fútbol Club (usually called Banco Obrero) was a professional club. The short-lived club has won one First Division title in the amateur era. The club was based in Caracas.

== Honours ==
- Primera División Venezolana: 1

Winners (1): 1956
