= C.D. Venezuela =

Venezuelan football club

Deportivo Venezuela
- Full name: Club Deportivo Venezuela
- Founded: 1926; 99 years ago
- Dissolved: 1946; 79 years ago
- Ground: Estadio Olímpico de la UCV; Caracas, Venezuela
- Capacity: 30,000
- League: Primera División Venezolana
Home colours	Away colours	Third colours

Club Deportivo Venezuela (usually called Deportivo Venezuela) was a Venezuelan professional club based in Caracas. Founded in 1926, the club has won four First Division titles in the amateur era.

== Honours ==
=== National ===
- Primera División Venezolana
  - Winners (4): 1928, 1929, 1931, 1933
