= Atlético Zulia =

- Full name: Atlético Zulia Fútbol Club
- Founded: 1996; 30 years ago
- Dissolved: 2000; 26 years ago
- League: Venezuelan Primera División

Atlético Zulia Fútbol Club was a Venezuelan professional club and the club has won one First Division title in the professional era. The club was based in Maracaibo.

== History ==
The club was founded in 1996 as Atlético Zulia Fútbol Club, and participated in the 1998 Copa Libertadores.

== Honours ==
=== National ===
- Venezuelan Primera División: 1
  - Winners (1): 1997–98
  - Runner-up (1): 1996–97
- Copa Venezuela: 1
  - Winners (1): 1997

== Performance in CONMEBOL competitions ==
- Copa Libertadores: 1 appearance

1998 – Preliminary Round
