= Unión S.C. =

Venezuelan football club

Unión
- Full name: Unión Sport Club
- Founded: 1925; 100 years ago
- Ground: Estadio Olímpico de la UCV; Caracas, Venezuela
- Capacity: 30,000
- League: Primera División Venezolana
Home colors	Away colors

Unión Sport Club (usually called Unión) was a professional football club. The club has won seven First Division titles in the amateur era. The club was based in Caracas.

== Honours ==
=== National ===
- Primera División Venezolana
  - Winners (7): 1932, 1934, 1935, 1939, 1940, 1947, 1950
