= Tiquire Flores F.C. =

Venezuelan football club

Tiquire Flores
- Full name: Tiquire Flores Fútbol Club
- Nickname(s): Los tomateros
- Founded: Estadio Olímpico Hermanos Ghersi Páez; Maracay, Venezuela
- Capacity: 14,000

Tiquire Flores Fútbol Club (usually called Tiquire Flores) was a professional football club. The club has one Copa Venezuela title in 1964. The club is based in Aragua.

== History ==
In the 1964 Venezuelan Primera División season, the club was defeated by Deportivo Galicia in the finals.

The club was 1964 Copa Venezuela champion, when it defeated Unión Deportiva Canarias.

On 1966, the club changed its name to Aragua FC until 1970 when it was changed to Tiquire Aragua.

On 1974, the club changed its name to Tiquire–Canarias, when it fused with Unión Deportiva Canarias.

== Titles ==
=== National ===
- Primera División Venezolana: 0

Runner-up (1): 1964

- Copa Venezuela: 1

Winners (1): 1964
Runner-up (1): 1963
