= Atlético San Cristóbal =

- Full name: Club Social y Deportivo Atlético San Cristóbal
- Nickname(s): La Naranja mecánica
- Founded: 1980; 45 years ago
- Ground: Estadio Polideportivo de Pueblo Nuevo; San Cristóbal, Táchira, Venezuela
- Capacity: 38,755
- League: Venezuelan Primera División
| Home colours | Away colours |

Club Atlético San Cristóbal was a Venezuelan professional football club and the club won one First Division title in the professional era. The club was based in San Cristóbal, Táchira. In 1986 it merged with Deportivo Táchira to form Unión Atlético Táchira.

== History ==
The club was founded in 1980 as Club Atlético San Cristóbal, and participated in the 1983 Copa Libertadores.

== Honours ==
=== National ===
- Venezuelan Primera División: 1982
- Venezuelan Segunda División: 1981

== Performance in CONMEBOL competitions ==
- Copa Libertadores: 1 appearance

1983 - Semifinals
