= Litoral S.C. =

Venezuelan football club

Litoral
- Full name: Litoral Sport Club
- Ground: Estadio Olímpico de la UCV; Caracas, Venezuela
- Capacity: 30,000
- League: Primera División Venezolana

Litoral Sport Club (usually called Litoral) was a professional club of Venezuela. The club has won one First Division title in the amateur era. The club was based in Caracas.

== History ==
The first team called Litoral de La Guaira was the "Litoral OSP" (Office of Port Services), which in 1935 began its activities and already in 1937 managed to win the "Copa Venezuela". Successively also won the Venezuelan amateur soccer championship in 1941, doubling his success in the Copa Venezuela. He also won the title of vice champion of Venezuelan football in 1937, 1938, 1939 and 1943. In 1952 he won the "Ascent Tournament". This first Litoral OSP disappeared in 1953, to reappear a dozen years later as the "Litoral FC".

In 1966, a group of La Guaira's businessmen (and members of the Italian community of La Guaira and Macuto) founded the "Litoral FC", which was unable to obtain the previous results of the Litoral OSP. In the 1967 tournament the Litoral FC won a fifth place in the final classification and that was the best result of his reappearance.

After only three years of competitions the team was dissolved, due to economic problems and lack of fans.

== Further developments ==
The football team of the city of La Guaira after many years -in 2008- was reorganized under a new management and was recreated with the name Deportivo La Guaira.

== Honours ==
- Primera División Venezolana: 1

Winners (1): 1941
Runner-up (4): 1937, 1938, 1939, 1943
