= Lara F.C. =

Defunct association football club in Venezuelan

Lara
- Full name: Lara Fútbol Club
- Nicknames: Los Diablos Rojos; Los Crepusculares
- Founded: 1965; 61 years ago
- Dissolved: 2012
- Ground: Estadio Metropolitano de Fútbol de Lara; Barquisimeto, Venezuela
- Capacity: 45,312
Home colours	Away colours	Third colours

The Lara Fútbol Club was a professional football club based in Barquisimeto, Lara, that was promoted to the Primera División in 1965, in their first year of existence. In 2012, due to strong financial problems, the team moved to the city of Los Teques, and subsequently to Caracas and changed its name to Metropolitanos Fútbol Club. Metropolitanos currently plays in the Venezuelan Primera División.

== History ==
In the 1965 Copa Venezuela, the club was defeated by Valencia in the finals.

In the 1966 Copa Libertadores, the club participated in the Group A with Boca Juniors, River Plate, Universitario, Deportivo Italia, and Alianza Lima, and was the last place with only four points.

In the 1968 Copa Venezuela, the club was defeated by Unión Deportiva Canarias in the finals.

In the 1979 Copa Venezuela, the club was defeated by Deportivo Galicia in the finals.

== Honours ==
- Primera División Venezolana

Professional Era (1): 1965

- Copa de Venezuela: 0

Runner-up (3): 1965, 1968, 1979

== Performance in CONMEBOL competitions ==
- Copa Libertadores: 1 appearance

1966: Group Stage

== See also ==
- Venezuelan Primera División
