= Loyola S.C. =

Venezuelan football club

Loyola
- Full name: Loyola Sport Club
- Founded: 1923; 102 years ago
- Ground: Estadio Olímpico de la UCV; Caracas, Venezuela
- Capacity: 30,000
- League: Primera División Venezolana

Loyola Sport Club (usually called Loyola) was a professional club. The club has won four First Division titles in the amateur era. The club is based in Caracas.

== Honours ==
=== National ===
- Primera División Venezolana
  - Winners (4): 1925, 1943, 1944, 1948
