= C.D. Vasco =

Venezuelan football club

Vasco
- Full name: Deportivo Vasco
- Ground: Estadio Olímpico de la UCV; Caracas, Venezuela
- Capacity: 30,000
- League: Primera División Venezolana

Club Deportivo Vasco (usually called Vasco) was a professional football club. The club has won one First Division title in the amateur era. The club is based in Caracas.

== Honours ==
- Primera División Venezolana: 1

Winners (1): 1954
