= Dos Caminos S.C. =

Venezuelan football club

Dos Caminos
- Full name: Dos Caminos Sport Club
- Founded: December 5, 1925; 99 years ago
- Ground: Estadio Olímpico de la UCV; Caracas, Venezuela
- Capacity: 30,000
- League: Primera División Venezolana

Dos Caminos Sport Club (usually called Dos Caminos) was a professional club. The club has won six First Division titles in the amateur era. The club is based in Caracas.

== Honours ==
=== National ===
- Primera División Venezolana
  - Winners (6): 1936, 1937, 1938, 1942, 1945, 1949
