= C.D. Español de Venezuela =

Venezuelan football club

Deportivo Español
- Full name: Club Deportivo Español
- Nickname: Españoles
- Founded: 1927; 98 years ago
- Dissolved: 1961
- Ground: Caracas
- League: Venezuelan Primera División
Home colours	Away colours

Club Deportivo Español was a professional club and the club has won two First Division titles in the professional era. The club is based in Barinas.

== Honours ==
=== National ===
- Venezuelan Primera División: 2
  - Winners (2): 1946, 1959
  - Runner-up (1): 1958
