= La Salle F.C. =

Venezuelan football club

La Salle
- Full name: La Salle Fútbol Club
- Founded: 1926; 99 years ago
- Ground: Estadio Olímpico de la UCV; Caracas, Venezuela
- Capacity: 30,000
- League: Primera División Venezolana

La Salle Fútbol Club (usually called La Salle) was a professional football club. The club has won two First Division titles in the amateur era. The club is based in Caracas.

== Honours ==
- Primera División Venezolana
  - Winners (2): 1952, 1955
  - Runners-up (4): 1950, 1953, 1956, 1957
