= Unión Deportiva Canarias =

Venezuelan football club

- Full name: Club Unión Deportiva Canarias
- Nickname(s): Los canarios
- Founded: 1963; 62 years ago
- Dissolved: 1979; 46 years ago
- Ground: Cocodrilos Sports Park; Estadio Olímpico de la UCV; Caracas, Venezuela
- Capacity: 15,000 and 30,000

Club Unión Deportiva Canarias (usually called Canarias) was a Venezuelan professional football club founded in 1963, and based in Caracas. The club had one First Division title in the professional era.

== Honours ==
=== National ===
- Primera División
  - Winners (1): 1968
- Copa Venezuela
  - Winners (2): 1963, 1968

== Performance in CONMEBOL competitions ==
- Copa Libertadores: 1 appearance

1969: First Round

- Copa Ganadores de Copa: 1 appearance

1970: First Round
