= C.D. Portugués =

Venezuelan football club

Deportivo Portugués
- Full name: Club Deportivo Portugués
- Founded: 1958; 68 years ago
- Dissolved: 1985
- Ground: Estadio Olímpico de la UCV; Caracas, Venezuela
- Capacity: 30,000
- League: Venezuelan Primera División
Home colours	Away colours

Club Deportivo Portugués (usually called Portugués) was a professional football club and the club has won four First Division titles in the professional era. The club is based in Caracas.

== Honours ==
=== National ===
- Primera División Venezolana
  - Winners (4): 1958, 1960, 1962, 1967
- Copa Venezuela
  - Winners (2): 1959, 1972

=== International ===
- Copa Simón Bolívar
  - Runners-up (1): 1972
