= Copa Libertadores records and statistics =

This page details the records and statistics of the Copa Libertadores. The Copa Libertadores is an international premier club tournament played annually by the top football clubs of South America. It includes 3–5 teams from all ten CONMEBOL members. It is usually held from January to November.

The data below does not include the 1948 South American Championship of Champions, as it is not listed by CONMEBOL either as a Copa Libertadores edition or as an official competition. It must be pointed out, however, that at least in the years 1996 and 1997, CONMEBOL entitled equal status to both the Copa Libertadores and the 1948 tournament. Vasco da Gama were allowed to participate in the Supercopa Libertadores, a CONMEBOL official competition for former Libertadores champions (not admitting participation for champions of the Copa CONMEBOL). The 1948 competition is referred to at the Conmebol website as the competition that, 12 years later, would become the Copa Libertadores.

== General performances ==
=== By club ===
Performance in the Copa Libertadores by club
| Club | Titles | Runners-up | Seasons won | Seasons runner-up |
|---|---|---|---|---|
| (Argentina) Independiente | 7 | 0 | 1964, 1965, 1972, 1973, 1974, 1975, 1984 | — |
| (Argentina) Boca Juniors | 6 | 6 | 1977, 1978, 2000, 2001, 2003, 2007 | 1963, 1979, 2004, 2012, 2018, 2023 |
| (Uruguay) Peñarol | 5 | 5 | 1960, 1961, 1966, 1982, 1987 | 1962, 1965, 1970, 1983, 2011 |
| (Argentina) River Plate | 4 | 3 | 1986, 1996, 2015, 2018 | 1966, 1976, 2019 |
| (Argentina) Estudiantes | 4 | 1 | 1968, 1969, 1970, 2009 | 1971 |
| (Brazil) Flamengo | 4 | 1 | 1981, 2019, 2022, 2025 | 2021 |
| (Brazil) Palmeiras | 3 | 4 | 1999, 2020, 2021 | 1961, 1968, 2000, 2025 |
| (Paraguay) Olimpia | 3 | 4 | 1979, 1990, 2002 | 1960, 1989, 1991, 2013 |
| (Uruguay) Nacional | 3 | 3 | 1971, 1980, 1988 | 1964, 1967, 1969 |
| (Brazil) São Paulo | 3 | 3 | 1992, 1993, 2005 | 1974, 1994, 2006 |
| (Brazil) Grêmio | 3 | 2 | 1983, 1995, 2017 | 1984, 2007 |
| (Brazil) Santos | 3 | 2 | 1962, 1963, 2011 | 2003, 2020 |
| (Brazil) Cruzeiro | 2 | 2 | 1976, 1997 | 1977, 2009 |
| (Brazil) Internacional | 2 | 1 | 2006, 2010 | 1980 |
| (Colombia) Atlético Nacional | 2 | 1 | 1989, 2016 | 1995 |
| (Chile) Colo-Colo | 1 | 1 | 1991 | 1973 |
| (Brazil) Atlético Mineiro | 1 | 1 | 2013 | 2024 |
| (Brazil) Fluminense | 1 | 1 | 2023 | 2008 |
| (Argentina) Vélez Sársfield | 1 | 0 | 1994 | — |
| (Ecuador) LDU Quito | 1 | 0 | 2008 | — |
| (Argentina) San Lorenzo | 1 | 0 | 2014 | — |
| (Argentina) Racing | 1 | 0 | 1967 | — |
| (Brazil) Botafogo | 1 | 0 | 2024 | — |
| (Brazil) Corinthians | 1 | 0 | 2012 | — |
| (Argentina) Argentinos Juniors | 1 | 0 | 1985 | — |
| (Brazil) Vasco da Gama | 1 | 0 | 1998 | — |
| (Colombia) Once Caldas | 1 | 0 | 2004 | — |
| (Colombia) América de Cali | 0 | 4 | — | 1985, 1986, 1987, 1996 |
| (Ecuador) Barcelona | 0 | 2 | — | 1990, 1998 |
| (Colombia) Deportivo Cali | 0 | 2 | — | 1978, 1999 |
| (Argentina) Newell's Old Boys | 0 | 2 | — | 1988, 1992 |
| (Chile) Cobreloa | 0 | 2 | — | 1981, 1982 |
| (Brazil) Athletico Paranaense | 0 | 2 | — | 2005, 2022 |
| (Chile) Universidad Católica | 0 | 1 | — | 1993 |
| (Peru) Universitario | 0 | 1 | — | 1972 |
| (Mexico) Guadalajara | 0 | 1 | — | 2010 |
| (Chile) Unión Española | 0 | 1 | — | 1975 |
| (Peru) Sporting Cristal | 0 | 1 | — | 1997 |
| (Ecuador) Independiente del Valle | 0 | 1 | — | 2016 |
| (Argentina) Lanús | 0 | 1 | — | 2017 |
| (Mexico) Cruz Azul | 0 | 1 | — | 2001 |
| (Mexico) UANL | 0 | 1 | — | 2015 |
| (Brazil) São Caetano | 0 | 1 | — | 2002 |
| (Paraguay) Nacional | 0 | 1 | — | 2014 |

=== By country ===
| Country | Winners | Runners-up | Winning clubs | Runners-up |
|---|---|---|---|---|
| Brazil | 25 | 20 | Flamengo (4); Grêmio (3); Palmeiras (3); São Paulo (3); Santos (3); Cruzeiro (2); Internacional (2); Vasco da Gama (1); Corinthians (1); Atlético Mineiro (1); Fluminense (1); Botafogo (1) | Palmeiras (4); São Paulo (3); Grêmio (2); Cruzeiro (2); Santos (2); Athletico Paranaense (2); Internacional (1); São Caetano (1); Flamengo (1); Fluminense (1); Atlético Mineiro (1) |
| Argentina | 25 | 13 | Independiente (7); Boca Juniors (6); Estudiantes (4); River Plate (4); Racing (1); Argentinos Juniors (1); Vélez Sársfield (1); San Lorenzo (1) | Boca Juniors (6); River Plate (3); Newell's Old Boys (2); Estudiantes (1); Lanús (1) |
| Uruguay | 8 | 8 | Peñarol (5); Nacional (3) | Peñarol (5); Nacional (3) |
| Colombia | 3 | 7 | Atlético Nacional (2); Once Caldas (1) | América de Cali (4); Deportivo Cali, (2); Atlético Nacional (1) |
| Paraguay | 3 | 5 | Olimpia (3) | Olimpia (4); Nacional (1) |
| Chile | 1 | 5 | Colo-Colo (1) | Cobreloa (2); Colo-Colo (1); Unión Española (1); Universidad Católica (1) |
| Ecuador | 1 | 3 | LDU Quito (1) | Barcelona (2); Independiente del Valle (1) |
| Mexico | 0 | 3 | — | Cruz Azul (1); Guadalajara (1); UANL (1) |
| Peru | 0 | 2 | — | Universitario (1); Sporting Cristal (1) |

=== By department, province or state ===
| Department, province or state | Winners | Runners-up | Winning clubs | Runners-up |
|---|---|---|---|---|
| (Argentina) Buenos Aires City | 13 | 9 | Boca Juniors (6), River Plate (4), Argentinos Juniors (1), Vélez Sársfield (1), San Lorenzo (1) | Boca Juniors (6), River Plate (3) |
| (Argentina) Buenos Aires Province | 12 | 2 | Independiente (7), Estudiantes (4), Racing (1) | Estudiantes (1), Lanús (1) |
| (Brazil) São Paulo State | 10 | 10 | Santos (3), São Paulo (3), Palmeiras (3), Corinthians (1) | Palmeiras (4), São Paulo (3), Santos (2), São Caetano (1) |
| (Uruguay) Montevideo Department | 8 | 8 | Peñarol (5), Nacional (3) | Peñarol (5), Nacional (3) |
| (Brazil) Rio de Janeiro State | 7 | 2 | Flamengo (4), Vasco da Gama (1), Fluminense (1), Botafogo (1) | Fluminense (1), Flamengo (1) |
| (Brazil) Rio Grande do Sul | 5 | 3 | Grêmio (3), Internacional (2) | Grêmio (2), Internacional (1) |
| (Paraguay) Asunción | 3 | 5 | Olimpia (3) | Olimpia (4), Nacional (1) |
| (Brazil) Minas Gerais | 3 | 3 | Cruzeiro (2), Atlético Mineiro (1) | Cruzeiro (2), Atlético Mineiro (1) |
| (Colombia) Antioquia | 2 | 1 | Atlético Nacional (2) | Atlético Nacional (1) |
| (Chile) Santiago | 1 | 3 | Colo-Colo (1) | Colo-Colo (1), Unión Española (1), Universidad Católica (1) |
| (Ecuador) Pichincha | 1 | 1 | LDU Quito (1) | Independiente del Valle (1) |
| (Colombia) Caldas | 1 | 0 | Once Caldas (1) | — |
| (Colombia) Valle del Cauca | 0 | 6 | — | América de Cali (4), Deportivo Cali, (2) |
| (Peru) Lima Province | 0 | 2 | — | Universitario (1), Sporting Cristal (1) |
| (Chile) Antofagasta | 0 | 2 | — | Cobreloa (2) |
| (Argentina) Santa Fe | 0 | 2 | — | Newell's Old Boys (2) |
| (Ecuador) Guayas | 0 | 2 | — | Barcelona (2) |
| (Brazil) Paraná | 0 | 2 | — | Athletico Paranaense (2) |
| Mexico City | 0 | 1 | — | Cruz Azul (1) |
| (Mexico) Jalisco | 0 | 1 | — | Guadalajara (1) |
| (Mexico) Nuevo León | 0 | 1 | — | UANL (1) |

=== By city ===
| City | Winners | Runners-up | Winning clubs | Runners-up |
|---|---|---|---|---|
| (Argentina) Buenos Aires | 13 | 10 | Boca Juniors (6), River Plate (4), Argentinos Juniors (1), Vélez Sársfield (1), San Lorenzo (1) | Boca Juniors (6), River Plate (3), Lanús (1) |
| (Uruguay) Montevideo | 8 | 8 | Peñarol (5), Nacional (3) | Peñarol (5), Nacional (3) |
| (Argentina) Avellaneda | 8 | 0 | Independiente (7), Racing (1) | — |
| (Brazil) São Paulo | 7 | 7 | São Paulo (3), Palmeiras (3), Corinthians (1) | Palmeiras (4), São Paulo (3) |
| (Brazil) Rio de Janeiro | 7 | 2 | Flamengo (4), Vasco da Gama (1), Fluminense (1), Botafogo (1) | Fluminense (1), Flamengo (1) |
| (Brazil) Porto Alegre | 5 | 3 | Grêmio (3), Internacional (2) | Grêmio (2), Internacional (1) |
| (Argentina) La Plata | 4 | 1 | Estudiantes (4) | Estudiantes (1) |
| (Paraguay) Asunción | 3 | 5 | Olimpia (3) | Olimpia (4), Nacional (1) |
| (Brazil) Belo Horizonte | 3 | 3 | Cruzeiro (2), Atlético Mineiro (1) | Cruzeiro (2), Atlético Mineiro (1) |
| (Brazil) Santos | 3 | 2 | Santos (3) | Santos (2) |
| (Colombia) Medellín | 2 | 1 | Atlético Nacional (2) | Atlético Nacional (1) |
| (Chile) Santiago | 1 | 3 | Colo-Colo (1) | Colo-Colo (1), Unión Española (1), Universidad Católica (1) |
| (Colombia) Manizales | 1 | 0 | Once Caldas (1) | — |
| (Ecuador) Quito | 1 | 0 | LDU Quito (1) | — |
| (Colombia) Cali | 0 | 6 | — | América de Cali (4), Deportivo Cali (2) |
| (Peru) Lima | 0 | 2 | — | Universitario (1), Sporting Cristal (1) |
| (Chile) Calama | 0 | 2 | — | Cobreloa (2) |
| (Argentina) Rosario | 0 | 2 | — | Newell's Old Boys (2) |
| (Ecuador) Guayaquil | 0 | 2 | — | Barcelona (2) |
| (Brazil) Curitiba | 0 | 2 | — | Athletico Paranaense (2) |
| Mexico City | 0 | 1 | — | Cruz Azul (1) |
| (Brazil) São Caetano do Sul | 0 | 1 | — | São Caetano (1) |
| (Mexico) Guadalajara | 0 | 1 | — | Guadalajara (1) |
| (Mexico) San Nicolás de los Garza | 0 | 1 | — | UANL (1) |
| (Ecuador) Sangolquí | 0 | 1 | — | Independiente del Valle (1) |

=== All-time top ten table ===
The list is current as of the end of 2025 edition. Last updated 6 December 2025.

| Rank | Club | Part | Titles | Games | W | D | L | GF | GA | GD | Pts |
|---|---|---|---|---|---|---|---|---|---|---|---|
| 1 | (Argentina) River Plate | 41 | 4 | 412 | 204 | 109 | 99 | 664 | 415 | +249 | 721 |
| 2 | (Uruguay) Nacional | 52 | 3 | 433 | 184 | 113 | 136 | 602 | 471 | +131 | 665 |
| 3 | (Uruguay) Peñarol | 51 | 5 | 395 | 177 | 83 | 135 | 585 | 478 | +107 | 614 |
| 4 | (Argentina) Boca Juniors | 32 | 6 | 335 | 174 | 85 | 76 | 492 | 288 | +204 | 605 |
| 5 | (Brazil) Palmeiras | 26 | 3 | 255 | 146 | 48 | 61 | 485 | 248 | +237 | 486 |
| 6 | (Paraguay) Olimpia | 46 | 3 | 348 | 135 | 99 | 114 | 486 | 432 | +54 | 504 |
| 7 | (Paraguay) Cerro Porteño | 46 | 0 | 353 | 130 | 98 | 125 | 432 | 448 | −16 | 488 |
| 8 | (Brazil) Grêmio | 23 | 3 | 215 | 112 | 44 | 59 | 335 | 205 | +130 | 380 |
| 9 | (Bolivia) Bolívar | 39 | 0 | 269 | 108 | 55 | 106 | 394 | 412 | −18 | 379 |
| 10 | (Chile) Colo-Colo | 38 | 1 | 273 | 104 | 66 | 103 | 362 | 374 | −12 | 378 |

=== CONMEBOL club ranking ===
This ranking is used for seeding in the qualifying and group stage draws of the Copa Libertadores, and is based on a club's performance in the ten most recent Copa Libertadores editions, its historic performance in the competition (considering the other previous editions), and its performance in local championship tournaments. Starting from 2021, the CONMEBOL ranking of the Copa Libertadores was updated to also include Copa Sudamericana performances, and thus was rebranded as the CONMEBOL Clubs Ranking.

The top 10 clubs as of 15 December 2025 are shown below.

| Rank | Club | Historical performance | Last 10 years performance | Total points |
|---|---|---|---|---|
| 1 | (Brazil) Palmeiras | 1157.6 | 8671 | 9828.6 |
| 2 | (Brazil) Flamengo | 694 | 8609.1 | 9303.1 |
| 3 | (Argentina) River Plate | 2628.8 | 6136 | 8762.8 |
| 4 | (Argentina) Boca Juniors | 2785.2 | 4574.8 | 7360 |
| 5 | (Uruguay) Peñarol | 2864.4 | 3165 | 6029.4 |
| 6 | (Brazil) Atlético Mineiro | 447.2 | 5502 | 5949.2 |
| 7 | (Brazil) São Paulo | 1764.8 | 3866.7 | 5631.5 |
| 8 | (Uruguay) Nacional | 2420.4 | 3100.6 | 5521 |
| 9 | (Argentina) Racing | 522.8 | 4789.9 | 5312.7 |
| 10 | (Ecuador) LDU Quito | 930.4 | 4237.6 | 5168 |

=== Number of participating clubs by country ===
The following is a list of the 219 clubs that have played at least one match in the Copa Libertadores, updated to the 2027 edition.

- Teams in bold: winners of the edition.
- Teams in italics: runners-up of the edition.

| Nation | # | Clubs | Years |
|---|---|---|---|
| Brazil (32) | 27 | Palmeiras | 1961, 1968, 1971, 1973, 1974, 1979, 1994, 1995, **1999**, 2000, 2001, 2005, 2006, 2009, 2013, 2016, 2017, 2018, 2019, **2020**, **2021**, 2022, 2023, 2024, 2025, 2026, 2027 |
| Brazil (32) | 23 | São Paulo | 1972, 1974, 1978, 1982, 1987, **1992**, **1993**, 1994, 2004, **2005**, 2006, 2007, 2008, 2009, 2010, 2013, 2015, 2016, 2019, 2020, 2021, 2024, 2025 |
| Brazil (32) | 23 | Flamengo | **1981**, 1982, 1983, 1984, 1991, 1993, 2002, 2007, 2008, 2010, 2012, 2014, 2017, 2018, **2019**, 2020, 2021, **2022**, 2023, 2024, **2025**, 2026, 2027 |
| Brazil (32) | 22 | Grêmio | 1982, **1983**, 1984, 1990, **1995**, 1996, 1997, 1998, 2002, 2003, 2007, 2009, 2011, 2013, 2014, 2016, **2017**, 2018, 2019, 2020, 2021, 2024 |
| Brazil (32) | 19 | Corinthians | 1977, 1991, 1996, 1999, 2000, 2003, 2006, 2010, 2011, **2012**, 2013, 2015, 2016, 2018, 2020, 2022, 2023, 2025, 2026 |
| Brazil (32) | 19 | Cruzeiro | 1967, 1975, **1976**, 1977, 1994, **1997**, 1998, 2001, 2004, 2008, 2009, 2010, 2011, 2014, 2015, 2018, 2019, 2026, 2027 |
| Brazil (32) | 16 | Santos | **1962**, **1963**, 1964, 1965, 1984, 2003, 2004, 2005, 2007, 2008, **2011**, 2012, 2017, 2018, 2020, 2021 |
| Brazil (32) | 16 | Internacional | 1976, 1977, 1980, 1989, 1993, **2006**, 2007, **2010**, 2011, 2012, 2015, 2019, 2020, 2021, 2023, 2025 |
| Brazil (32) | 14 | Atlético Mineiro | 1972, 1978, 1981, 2000, **2013**, 2014, 2015, 2016, 2017, 2019, 2021, 2022, 2023, 2024 |
| Brazil (32) | 12 | Fluminense | 1971, 1985, 2008, 2011, 2012, 2013, 2021, 2022, **2023**, 2024, 2026, 2027 |
| Brazil (32) | 9 | Vasco da Gama | 1975, 1980, 1985, 1990, **1998**, 1999, 2001, 2012, 2018 |
| Brazil (32) | 9 | Athletico Paranaense | 2000, 2002, 2005, 2014, 2017, 2019, 2020, 2022, 2023 |
| Brazil (32) | 8 | Botafogo | 1963, 1973, 1996, 2014, 2017, **2024**, 2025, 2026 |
| Brazil (32) | 5 | Bahia | 1960, 1964, 1989, 2025, 2026 |
| Brazil (32) | 3 | Guarani | 1979, 1987, 1988 |
| Brazil (32) | 3 | São Caetano | 2001, 2002, 2004 |
| Brazil (32) | 3 | Fortaleza | 2022, 2023, 2025 |
| Brazil (32) | 2 | Coritiba | 1986, 2004 |
| Brazil (32) | 2 | Sport | 1988, 2009 |
| Brazil (32) | 2 | Chapecoense | 2017, 2018 |
| Brazil (32) | 2 | Red Bull Bragantino | 2022, 2024 |
| Brazil (32) | 1 | Náutico | 1968 |
| Brazil (32) | 1 | Bangu | 1986 |
| Brazil (32) | 1 | Criciúma | 1992 |
| Brazil (32) | 1 | Juventude | 2000 |
| Brazil (32) | 1 | Paysandu | 2003 |
| Brazil (32) | 1 | Santo André | 2005 |
| Brazil (32) | 1 | Goias | 2006 |
| Brazil (32) | 1 | Paulista | 2006 |
| Brazil (32) | 1 | Paraná | 2007 |
| Brazil (32) | 1 | América Mineiro | 2022 |
| Brazil (32) | 1 | Mirassol | 2026 |
| Venezuela (30) | 29 | Deportivo Táchira | 1980, 1982, 1983, 1985, 1987, 1988, 1989, 1991, 2000, 2001, 2004, 2005, 2006, 2007, 2009, 2010, 2011, 2012, 2015, 2016, 2017, 2018, 2020, 2021, 2022, 2024, 2025, 2026, 2027 |
| Venezuela (30) | 22 | Caracas | 1993, 1995, 1996, 1998, 2002, 2004, 2005, 2006, 2007, 2008, 2009, 2010, 2011, 2012, 2013, 2014, 2016, 2019, 2020, 2021, 2022, 2024 |
| Venezuela (30) | 11 | Deportivo Italia | 1964, 1966, 1967, 1969, 1971, 1972, 1985, 2000, 2001, 2010, 2011 |
| Venezuela (30) | 9 | Deportivo Galicia | 1965, 1967, 1968, 1970, 1971, 1975, 1976, 1979, 1980 |
| Venezuela (30) | 9 | Portuguesa | 1974, 1975, 1976, 1977, 1978, 1979, 1981, 1984, 2024 |
| Venezuela (30) | 8 | Estudiantes de Mérida | 1977, 1978, 1981, 1982, 1987, 1999, 2003, 2020 |
| Venezuela (30) | 7 | Carabobo | 2017, 2018, 2020, 2023, 2025, 2026, 2027 |
| Venezuela (30) | 7 | Zamora | 2012, 2014, 2015, 2017, 2019, 2023 |
| Venezuela (30) | 5 | Marítimo | 1988, 1989, 1991, 1992, 1994 |
| Venezuela (30) | 5 | Mineros de Guayana | 1990, 1997, 2005, 2008, 2015 |
| Venezuela (30) | 5 | Deportivo Lara | 2013, 2018, 2019, 2021, 2022 |
| Venezuela (30) | 4 | Minervén | 1993, 1994, 1996, 1997 |
| Venezuela (30) | 4 | Unión Atlético Maracaibo | 2004, 2006, 2007, 2008 |
| Venezuela (30) | 4 | Monagas | 2018, 2022, 2023, 2025 |
| Venezuela (30) | 4 | Deportivo La Guaira | 2019, 2021, 2026, 2027 |
| Venezuela (30) | 3 | Valencia | 1970, 1972, 1974 |
| Venezuela (30) | 3 | Universidad de Los Andes | 1984, 1992, 1999 |
| Venezuela (30) | 3 | Trujillanos | 1995, 2002, 2016 |
| Venezuela (30) | 3 | Deportivo Anzoátegui | 2009, 2013, 2014 |
| Venezuela (30) | 2 | Universidad Central | 2025, 2026 |
| Venezuela (30) | 2 | Metropolitanos | 2023, 2027 |
| Venezuela (30) | 1 | Lara | 1966 |
| Venezuela (30) | 1 | Portugués | 1968 |
| Venezuela (30) | 1 | Unión Deportiva Canarias | 1969 |
| Venezuela (30) | 1 | San Cristóbal | 1983 |
| Venezuela (30) | 1 | Pepeganga Margarita | 1990 |
| Venezuela (30) | 1 | Atlético Zulia | 1998 |
| Venezuela (30) | 1 | Nacional Táchira | 2003 |
| Venezuela (30) | 1 | Zulia | 2017 |
| Venezuela (30) | 1 | Academia Puerto Cabello | 2024 |
| Argentina (28) | 41 | River Plate | 1966, 1967, 1970, 1973, 1976, 1977, 1978, 1980, 1981, 1982, **1986**, 1987, 1990, 1991, 1993, 1995, **1996**, 1997, 1998, 1999, 2000, 2001, 2002, 2003, 2004, 2005, 2006, 2007, 2008, 2009, **2015**, 2016, 2017, **2018**, 2019, 2020, 2021, 2022, 2023, 2024, 2025 |
| Argentina (28) | 35 | Boca Juniors | 1963, 1965, 1966, 1970, 1971, **1977**, **1978**, 1979, 1982, 1986, 1989, 1991, 1994, **2000**, **2001**, 2002, **2003**, 2004, 2005, **2007**, 2008, 2009, 2012, 2013, 2015, 2016, 2018, 2019, 2020, 2021, 2022, 2023, 2025, 2026, 2027 |
| Argentina (28) | 20 | Independiente | 1961, **1964**, **1965**, 1966, 1968, **1972**, **1973**, **1974**, **1975**, 1976, 1978, 1979, **1984**, 1985, 1987, 1990, 1995, 2004, 2011, 2018 |
| Argentina (28) | 19 | Estudiantes | **1968**, **1969**, **1970**, 1971, 1976, 1983, 1984, 2006, 2008, **2009**, 2010, 2011, 2015, 2017, 2018, 2022, 2024, 2025, 2026 |
| Argentina (28) | 18 | San Lorenzo | 1960, 1973, 1988, 1992, 1996, 2000, 2001, 2002, 2005, 2008, 2009, **2014**, 2015, 2016, 2017, 2019, 2021, 2024 |
| Argentina (28) | 18 | Velez Sarsfield | 1980, **1994**, 1995, 1997, 1999, 2001, 2002, 2004, 2006, 2007, 2010, 2011, 2012, 2013, 2014, 2021, 2022, 2025 |
| Argentina (28) | 15 | Rosario Central | 1971, 1972, 1974, 1975, 1981, 1987, 2000, 2001, 2004, 2006, 2016, 2019, 2024, 2026, 2027 |
| Argentina (28) | 13 | Racing | 1962, **1967**, 1968, 1989, 1997, 2003, 2015, 2016, 2018, 2020, 2021, 2023, 2025 |
| Argentina (28) | 8 | Newell's Old Boys | 1975, 1988, 1992, 1993, 2006, 2010, 2013, 2014 |
| Argentina (28) | 7 | Argentinos Juniors | **1985**, 1986, 2011, 2021, 2023, 2026, 2027 |
| Argentina (28) | 7 | Lanús | 2008, 2009, 2010, 2012, 2014, 2017, 2026 |
| Argentina (28) | 5 | Huracán | 1974, 2015, 2016, 2019, 2023 |
| Argentina (28) | 5 | Talleres | 2002, 2019, 2022, 2024, 2025 |
| Argentina (28) | 5 | Godoy Cruz | 2011, 2012, 2017, 2019, 2024 |
| Argentina (28) | 4 | Banfield | 2005, 2007, 2010, 2018 |
| Argentina (28) | 4 | Arsenal | 2008, 2012, 2013, 2014 |
| Argentina (28) | 3 | Colón | 1998, 2010, 2022 |
| Argentina (28) | 3 | Atlético Tucumán | 2017, 2018, 2020 |
| Argentina (28) | 2 | Quilmes | 1979, 2005 |
| Argentina (28) | 2 | Ferro Carril Oeste | 1983, 1985 |
| Argentina (28) | 2 | Gimnasia y Esgrima | 2003, 2007 |
| Argentina (28) | 2 | Tigre | 2013, 2020 |
| Argentina (28) | 2 | Defensa y Justicia | 2020, 2021 |
| Argentina (28) | 2 | Independiente Rivadavia | 2026, 2026 Copa Libertadoresores|2027]] |
| Argentina (28) | 2 | Platense | 2026, 2027 |
| Argentina (28) | 1 | Patronato | 2023 |
| Argentina (28) | 1 | Central Córdoba | 2025 |
| Argentina (28) | 1 | Belgrano | 2027 |
| Peru (24) | 41 | Sporting Cristal | 1962, 1968, 1969, 1971, 1973, 1974, 1978, 1980, 1981, 1984, 1989, 1990, 1992, 1993, 1995, 1996, 1997, 1998, 1999, 2000, 2001, 2002, 2003, 2004, 2005, 2006, 2007, 2009, 2013, 2014, 2015, 2016, 2017, 2019, 2020, 2021, 2022, 2023, 2024, 2025, 2026 |
| Peru (24) | 37 | Universitario | 1961, 1965, 1966, 1967, 1968, 1970, 1971, 1972, 1973, 1975, 1979, 1983, 1985, 1986, 1988, 1989, 1991, 1993, 1994, 1996, 1999, 2000, 2001, 2003, 2006, 2009, 2010, 2014, 2017, 2018, 2020, 2021, 2022, 2024, 2025, 2026, 2027 |
| Peru (24) | 33 | Alianza Lima | 1963, 1964, 1966, 1972, 1976, 1978, 1979, 1983, 1987, 1988, 1994, 1995, 1997, 1998, 2000, 2002, 2003, 2004, 2005, 2007, 2010, 2011, 2012, 2015, 2018, 2019, 2020, 2022, 2023, 2024, 2025, 2026, 2027 |
| Peru (24) | 10 | Melgar | 1982, 1984, 2016, 2017, 2018, 2019, 2023, 2024, 2025, 2027 |
| Peru (24) | 6 | Sport Boys | 1967, 1977, 1985, 1991, 1992, 2001 |
| Peru (24) | 6 | Cienciano | 2002, 2004, 2005, 2006, 2007, 2008 |
| Peru (24) | 5 | Cusco | 2013, 2014, 2018, 2019, 2026 |
| Peru (24) | 4 | Juan Aurich | 1969, 2010, 2012, 2015 |
| Peru (24) | 4 | Universidad César Vallejo | 2013, 2016, 2021, 2022 |
| Peru (24) | 3 | Union Huaral | 1975, 1977, 1990 |
| Peru (24) | 3 | Universidad San Martín | 2008, 2009, 2011 |
| Peru (24) | 2 | Deportivo Municipal | 1982, 2017 |
| Peru (24) | 2 | Sport Huancayo | 2012, 2023 |
| Peru (24) | 1 | Defensor Arica | 1970 |
| Peru (24) | 1 | Defensor Lima | 1974 |
| Peru (24) | 1 | Alfonso Ugarte | 1976 |
| Peru (24) | 1 | Atlético Chalaco | 1980 |
| Peru (24) | 1 | Atlético Torino | 1981 |
| Peru (24) | 1 | UTC | 1986 |
| Peru (24) | 1 | San Agustín | 1987 |
| Peru (24) | 1 | Coronel Bolognesi | 2008 |
| Peru (24) | 1 | León de Huánuco | 2011 |
| Peru (24) | 1 | Binacional | 2020 |
| Peru (24) | 1 | Ayacucho | 2021 |
| Chile (22) | 39 | Colo-Colo | 1961, 1964, 1967, 1971, 1973, 1974, 1980, 1982, 1983, 1985, 1987, 1988, 1989, 1990, **1991**, 1992, 1994, 1997, 1998, 1999, 2003, 2004, 2005, 2006, 2007, 2008, 2009, 2010, 2011, 2015, 2016, 2017, 2018, 2020, 2022, 2023, 2024, 2025, 2027 |
| Chile (22) | 30 | Universidad Católica | 1962, 1966, 1967, 1968, 1969, 1984, 1986, 1988, 1990, 1992, 1993, 1995, 1996, 1997, 1998, 1999, 2000, 2002, 2003, 2006, 2008, 2010, 2011, 2012, 2017, 2019, 2020, 2021, 2022, 2026 |
| Chile (22) | 26 | Universidad de Chile | 1960, 1963, 1965, 1966, 1968, 1970, 1972, 1977, 1981, 1995, 1996, 2000, 2001, 2005, 2009, 2010, 2012, 2013, 2014, 2015, 2016, 2018, 2019, 2020, 2021, 2025 |
| Chile (22) | 13 | Unión Española | 1971, 1973, 1974, 1975, 1976, 1978, 1994, 2006, 2011, 2012, 2014, 2017, 2021 |
| Chile (22) | 13 | Cobreloa | 1981, 1982, 1983, 1987, 1989, 1993, 2000, 2001, 2002, 2003 2004, 2005, 2007 |
| Chile (22) | 7 | Palestino | 1976, 1978, 1979, 2015, 2019, 2020, 2024 |
| Chile (22) | 5 | O'Higgins | 1979, 1980, 1984, 2014, 2026 |
| Chile (22) | 4 | Huachipato | 1975, 2013, 2024, 2026 |
| Chile (22) | 3 | Santiago Wanderers | 1969, 2002, 2018 |
| Chile (22) | 3 | Everton | 1977, 2009, 2022 |
| Chile (22) | 3 | Cobresal | 1986, 2016, 2024 |
| Chile (22) | 3 | Universidad de Concepción | 2004, 2018, 2019 |
| Chile (22) | 3 | Audax Italiano | 2007, 2008, 2022 |
| Chile (22) | 3 | Deportes Iquique | 2013, 2017, 2025 |
| Chile (22) | 3 | Coquimbo Unido | 1992, 2026, 2027 |
| Chile (22) | 2 | Magallanes | 1985, 2023 |
| Chile (22) | 2 | Deportes Concepción | 1991, 2001 |
| Chile (22) | 2 | Ñublense | 2023, 2025 |
| Chile (22) | 1 | Rangers | 1970 |
| Chile (22) | 1 | Unión San Felipe | 1972 |
| Chile (22) | 1 | Unión La Calera | 2021 |
| Chile (22) | 1 | Curicó Unido | 2023 |
| Bolivia (22) | 41 | Bolívar | 1967, 1969, 1970, 1976, 1977, 1979, 1983, 1984, 1986, 1988, 1989, 1991, 1992, 1993, 1994, 1995, 1997, 1998, 2000, 2002, 2003, 2004, 2005, 2006, 2007, 2010, 2011, 2012, 2013, 2014, 2016, 2018, 2019, 2020, 2021, 2022, 2023, 2024, 2025, 2026, 2027 |
| Bolivia (22) | 32 | The Strongest | 1965, 1971, 1975, 1978, 1980, 1981, 1982, 1987, 1989, 1990, 1994, 2000, 2001, 2003, 2004, 2005, 2006, 2012, 2013, 2014, 2015, 2016, 2017, 2018, 2019, 2020, 2021, 2022, 2023, 2024, 2025, 2026 |
| Bolivia (22) | 21 | Oriente Petrolero | 1972, 1973, 1977, 1978, 1980, 1985, 1987, 1988, 1990, 1991, 1997, 1998, 2001, 2002, 2003, 2005, 2006, 2011, 2014, 2016, 2018 |
| Bolivia (22) | 20 | Jorge Wilstermann | 1960, 1961, 1966, 1968, 1973, 1974, 1975, 1979, 1981, 1982, 1986, 1995, 1999, 2001, 2004, 2011, 2017, 2018, 2019, 2020 |
| Bolivia (22) | 8 | Blooming | 1983, 1984, 1985, 1999, 2000, 2007, 2010, 2025 |
| Bolivia (22) | 8 | San José | 1992, 1993, 1996, 2008, 2013, 2015, 2019, 2020 |
| Bolivia (22) | 7 | Always Ready | 1968, 2021, 2022, 2023, 2024, 2026, 2027 |
| Bolivia (22) | 6 | Real Potosí | 2002, 2007, 2008, 2009, 2010, 2012 |
| Bolivia (22) | 3 | Municipal | 1962, 1966, 1974 |
| Bolivia (22) | 3 | Aurora | 1964, 2009, 2024 |
| Bolivia (22) | 3 | Universitario de Sucre | 2009, 2015, 2017 |
| Bolivia (22) | 2 | Chaco Petrolero | 1971, 1972 |
| Bolivia (22) | 2 | Guabirá | 1976, 1996 |
| Bolivia (22) | 2 | Nacional Potosí | 2023, 2026 |
| Bolivia (22) | 1 | 31 de Octubre | 1967 |
| Bolivia (22) | 1 | Litoral | 1969 |
| Bolivia (22) | 1 | Universitario (LP) | 1970 |
| Bolivia (22) | 1 | La Paz | 2008 |
| Bolivia (22) | 1 | Sport Boys | 2017 |
| Bolivia (22) | 1 | Royal Pari | 2021 |
| Bolivia (22) | 1 | Independiente Petrolero | 2022 |
| Bolivia (22) | 1 | San Antonio Bulo Bulo | 2025 |
| Uruguay (20) | 53 | Nacional | 1962, 1964, 1966, 1967, 1968, 1969, 1970, **1971**, 1972, 1973, 1974, 1976, 1979, **1980**, 1981, 1983, 1984, **1988**, 1989, 1991, 1992, 1993, 1994, 1997, 1998, 1999, 2000, 2001, 2002, 2003, 2004, 2005, 2006, 2007, 2008, 2009, 2010, 2011, 2012, 2013, 2014, 2015, 2016, 2017, 2018, 2019, 2020, 2021, 2022, 2023, 2024, 2025, 2026 |
| Uruguay (20) | 52 | Peñarol | **1960**, **1961**, 1962, 1963, 1965, **1966**, 1967, 1968, 1969, 1970, 1971, 1972, 1973, 1974, 1975, 1976, 1977, 1978, 1979, 1981, **1982**, 1983, 1985, 1986, **1987**, 1988, 1989, 1995, 1996, 1997, 1998, 2000, 2001, 2002, 2003, 2004, 2005, 2009, 2011, 2012, 2013, 2014, 2016, 2017, 2018, 2019, 2020, 2022, 2024, 2025, 2026, 2027 |
| Uruguay (20) | 18 | Defensor Sporting | 1977, 1980, 1982, 1990, 1992, 1994, 1996, 2001, 2006, 2007, 2009, 2012, 2013, 2014, 2018, 2019, 2024, 2025 |
| Uruguay (20) | 10 | Montevideo Wanderers | 1975, 1983, 1986, 1988, 2002, 2008, 2015, 2017, 2018, 2021 |
| Uruguay (20) | 8 | Danubio | 1978, 1984, 1989, 2005, 2007, 2008, 2015, 2019 |
| Uruguay (20) | 6 | Bella Vista | 1981, 1985, 1991, 1993, 1999, 2000 |
| Uruguay (20) | 5 | Liverpool | 2011, 2021, 2023, 2024, 2026 |
| Uruguay (20) | 3 | Progreso | 1987, 1990, 2020 |
| Uruguay (20) | 3 | Cerro | 1995, 2010, 2017 |
| Uruguay (20) | 2 | Fénix | 2003, 2004 |
| Uruguay (20) | 2 | Boston River | 2023, 2025 |
| Uruguay (20) | 2 | Montevideo City Torque | 2022, 2027 |
| Uruguay (20) | 1 | Rocha | 2006 |
| Uruguay (20) | 1 | Racing | 2010 |
| Uruguay (20) | 1 | River Plate | 2016 |
| Uruguay (20) | 1 | Cerro Largo | 2020 |
| Uruguay (20) | 1 | Rentistas | 2021 |
| Uruguay (20) | 1 | Plaza Colonia | 2022 |
| Uruguay (20) | 1 | Deportivo Maldonado | 2023 |
| Uruguay (20) | 1 | Juventud | 2026 |
| Mexico (19) | 7 | América | 1998, 2000, 2002, 2004, 2007, 2008, 2011 |
| Mexico (19) | 7 | Guadalajara | 1998, 2005, 2006, 2008, 2009, 2010, 2012 |
| Mexico (19) | 4 | Morelia | 2002, 2010, 2014, 2015 |
| Mexico (19) | 4 | UANL | 2005, 2006, 2012, 2015 |
| Mexico (19) | 3 | Atlas | 2000, 2008, 2015 |
| Mexico (19) | 3 | Cruz Azul | 2001, 2003, 2012 |
| Mexico (19) | 3 | UNAM | 2003, 2006, 2016 |
| Mexico (19) | 3 | Toluca | 2007, 2013, 2016 |
| Mexico (19) | 3 | San Luis | 2009, 2010, 2011 |
| Mexico (19) | 2 | Necaxa | 1999, 2007 |
| Mexico (19) | 2 | Monterrey | 1999, 2010 |
| Mexico (19) | 2 | Santos Laguna | 2004, 2014 |
| Mexico (19) | 2 | Pachuca | 2005, 2009 |
| Mexico (19) | 2 | León | 2013, 2014 |
| Mexico (19) | 1 | Atlante | 2001 |
| Mexico (19) | 1 | Tecos | 2010 |
| Mexico (19) | 1 | Chiapas | 2011 |
| Mexico (19) | 1 | Tijuana | 2013 |
| Mexico (19) | 1 | Puebla | 2016 |
| Ecuador (19) | 32 | Barcelona | 1961, 1964, 1967, 1969, 1971, 1972, 1981, 1982, 1983, 1986, 1987, 1988, 1990, 1991, 1992, 1993, 1994, 1996, 1998, 2003, 2004, 2013, 2015, 2017, 2019, 2020, 2021, 2022, 2023, 2024, 2025, 2026 |
| Ecuador (19) | 29 | Emelec | 1962, 1966, 1967, 1968, 1971, 1973, 1980, 1989, 1990, 1994, 1995, 1997, 1999, 2000, 2001, 2002, 2003, 2007, 2010, 2011, 2012, 2013, 2014, 2015, 2016, 2017, 2018, 2019, 2022 |
| Ecuador (19) | 27 | El Nacional | 1968, 1973, 1974, 1975, 1977, 1978, 1979, 1983, 1984, 1985, 1987, 1993, 1995, 1997, 2000, 2001, 2002, 2003, 2004, 2006, 2007, 2009, 2012, 2017, 2023, 2024, 2025 |
| Ecuador (19) | 23 | LDU Quito | 1970, 1975, 1976, 1978, 1982, 1991, 1999, 2000, 2004, 2005, 2006, 2007, **2008**, 2009, 2011, 2013, 2016, 2019, 2020, 2021, 2024, 2025, 2026 |
| Ecuador (19) | 13 | Independiente del Valle | 2014, 2015, 2016, 2017, 2018, 2020, 2021, 2022, 2023, 2024, 2025, 2026, 2027 |
| Ecuador (19) | 10 | Deportivo Quito | 1965, 1969, 1986, 1989, 1998, 2009, 2010, 2011, 2012, 2014 |
| Ecuador (19) | 7 | Universidad Católica | 1974, 1980, 2021, 2022, 2023, 2026, 2027 |
| Ecuador (19) | 7 | Deportivo Cuenca | 1976, 1977, 2005, 2006, 2008, 2009, 2010 |
| Ecuador (19) | 4 | Olmedo | 2001, 2002, 2005, 2008 |
| Ecuador (19) | 3 | 9 de Octubre | 1966, 1984, 1985 |
| Ecuador (19) | 3 | Delfín | 2018, 2019, 2020 |
| Ecuador (19) | 3 | Macará | 2018, 2020, 2027 |
| Ecuador (19) | 2 | América | 1970, 1972 |
| Ecuador (19) | 2 | Técnico Universitario | 1979, 1981 |
| Ecuador (19) | 2 | Aucas | 2023, 2024 |
| Ecuador (19) | 1 | Everest | 1963 |
| Ecuador (19) | 1 | Filanbanco | 1988 |
| Ecuador (19) | 1 | Valdez | 1992 |
| Ecuador (19) | 1 | ESPOLI | 1996 |
| Colombia (17) | 27 | Atlético Nacional | 1972, 1974, 1975, 1977, 1982, **1989**, 1990, 1991, 1992, 1993, 1995, 2000, 2006, 2008, 2012, 2014, 2015, **2016**, 2017, 2018, 2019, 2021, 2022, 2023, 2024, 2025, 2027 |
| Colombia (17) | 21 | Deportivo Cali | 1968, 1969, 1970, 1971, 1973, 1975, 1977, 1978, 1979, 1981, 1986, 1987, 1997, 1999, 2001, 2003, 2004, 2006, 2014, 2016, 2022 |
| Colombia (17) | 21 | América de Cali | 1970, 1980, 1983, 1984, 1985, 1986, 1987, 1988, 1991, 1992, 1993, 1996, 1998, 2000, 2001, 2002, 2003, 2005, 2009, 2020, 2021 |
| Colombia (17) | 20 | Millonarios | 1960, 1962, 1963, 1964, 1968, 1973, 1974, 1976, 1979, 1985, 1988, 1989, 1995, 1997, 2013, 2017, 2018, 2022, 2023, 2024 |
| Colombia (17) | 20 | Junior | 1971, 1978, 1981, 1984, 1994, 1996, 2000, 2001, 2005, 2010, 2011, 2012, 2017, 2018, 2019, 2020, 2021, 2024, 2026, 2027 |
| Colombia (17) | 15 | Santa Fe | 1961, 1967, 1972, 1976, 1980, 2006, 2013, 2014, 2015, 2016, 2017, 2018, 2021, 2025, 2026 |
| Colombia (17) | 11 | Independiente Medellín | 1967, 1994, 2003, 2005, 2009, 2010, 2017, 2019, 2020, 2023, 2026 |
| Colombia (17) | 11 | Deportes Tolima | 1982, 1983, 2004, 2007, 2011, 2013, 2019, 2020, 2022, 2025, 2026 |
| Colombia (17) | 8 | Once Caldas | 1999, 2002, **2004**, 2005, 2010, 2011, 2012, 2015 |
| Colombia (17) | 2 | Atlético Bucaramanga | 1998, 2025 |
| Colombia (17) | 2 | Cúcuta Deportivo | 2007, 2008 |
| Colombia (17) | 2 | Boyacá Chicó | 2008, 2009 |
| Colombia (17) | 1 | Unión Magdalena | 1969 |
| Colombia (17) | 1 | Cortuluá | 2002 |
| Colombia (17) | 1 | Deportivo Pasto | 2007 |
| Colombia (17) | 1 | Deportivo Pereira | 2023 |
| Colombia (17) | 1 | Águilas Doradas | 2024 |
| Paraguay (13) | 47 | Cerro Porteño | 1962, 1964, 1967, 1969, 1971, 1972, 1973, 1974, 1975, 1978, 1980, 1981, 1985, 1988, 1990, 1991, 1992, 1993, 1994, 1995, 1996, 1997, 1998, 1999, 2000, 2001, 2002, 2003, 2005, 2006, 2007, 2008, 2010, 2011, 2013, 2014, 2015, 2016, 2018, 2019, 2020, 2021, 2022, 2023, 2024, 2025, 2026 |
| Paraguay (13) | 47 | Olimpia | 1960, 1961, 1963, 1966, 1969, 1970, 1972, 1973, 1974, 1975, 1976, 1977, **1979**, 1980, 1981, 1982, 1983, 1984, 1986, 1987, 1988, 1989, **1990**, 1991, 1993, 1994, 1995, 1996, 1998, 1999, 2000, 2001, **2002**, 2003, 2004, 2012, 2013, 2016, 2017, 2018, 2019, 2020, 2021, 2022, 2023, 2025, 2027 |
| Paraguay (13) | 25 | Libertad | 1968, 1977, 1978, 2003, 2004, 2005, 2006, 2007, 2008, 2009, 2010, 2011, 2012, 2013, 2015, 2017, 2018, 2019, 2020, 2021, 2022, 2023, 2024, 2025, 2026 |
| Paraguay (13) | 21 | Guaraní | 1965, 1966, 1967, 1968, 1970, 1971, 1985, 1997, 2001, 2004, 2009, 2011, 2014, 2015, 2016, 2017, 2018, 2020, 2021, 2022, 2026 |
| Paraguay (13) | 11 | Nacional | 1983, 1986, 2006, 2009, 2010, 2012, 2014, 2019, 2023, 2024, 2025 |
| Paraguay (13) | 6 | Sol de América | 1979, 1980, 1982, 1987, 1989, 1992 |
| Paraguay (13) | 3 | Sportivo Luqueño | 1976, 1984, 2008 |
| Paraguay (13) | 2 | Colegiales | 1991, 2000 |
| Paraguay (13) | 2 | 12 de Octubre | 2002, 2003 |
| Paraguay (13) | 2 | Tacuary | 2005, 2007 |
| Paraguay (13) | 1 | Deportivo Capiatá | 2017 |
| Paraguay (13) | 1 | Sportivo Trinidense | 2024 |
| Paraguay (13) | 1 | 2 de Mayo | 2026 |
| Paraguay (13) | 1 | Recoleta | 2027 |

== Clubs ==
=== By semi-final appearances ===
| Club | No. | Years in semi-finals |
|---|---|---|
| (Uruguay) Peñarol | 21 | **1960**, **1961**, **1962**, 1963, **1965**, **1966**, 1967, 1968, 1969, **1970**, 1972, 1974, 1976, 1979, 1981, **1982**, **1983**, 1985, **1987**, **2011**, 2024 |
| (Argentina) River Plate | 21 | **1966**, 1967, 1970, **1976**, 1978, 1982, **1986**, 1987, 1990, 1995, **1996**, 1998, 1999, 2004, 2005, **2015**, 2017, **2018**, **2019**, 2020, 2024 |
| (Argentina) Boca Juniors | 19 | **1963**, 1965, 1966, **1977**, **1978**, **1979**, 1991, **2000**, **2001**, **2003**, **2004**, **2007**, 2008, **2012**, 2016, **2018**, 2019, 2020, **2023** |
| (Brazil) Palmeiras | 13 | **1961**, **1968**, 1971, **1999**, **2000**, 2001, 2018, **2020**, **2021**, 2022, 2023, **2025**, **2026** |
| (Uruguay) Nacional | 13 | 1962, **1964**, 1966, **1967**, **1969**, **1971**, 1972, **1980**, 1981, 1983, 1984, **1988**, 2009 |
| (Argentina) Independiente | 12 | **1964**, **1965**, 1966, **1972**, **1973**, **1974**, **1975**, 1976, 1979, **1984**, 1985, 1987 |
| (Paraguay) Olimpia | 12 | **1960**, 1961, **1979**, 1980, 1982, 1986, **1989**, **1990**, **1991**, 1994, **2002**, **2013** |
| (Brazil) São Paulo | 10 | 1972, **1974**, **1992**, **1993**, **1994**, 2004, **2005**, **2006**, 2010, 2016 |
| (Brazil) Grêmio | 10 | **1983**, **1984**, **1995**, 1996, 2002, **2007**, 2009, **2017**, 2018, 2019 |
| (Colombia) América de Cali | 10 | 1980, 1983, **1985**, **1986**, **1987**, 1988, 1992, 1993, **1996**, 2003 |
| (Brazil) Santos | 9 | **1962**, **1963**, 1964, 1965, **2003**, 2007, **2011**, 2012, **2020** |
| (Ecuador) Barcelona | 9 | 1971, 1972, 1986, 1987, **1990**, 1992, **1998**, 2017, 2021 |
| (Brazil) Flamengo | 8 | **1981**, 1982, 1984, **2019**, **2021**, **2022**, **2025**, 2026 |
| (Argentina) Estudiantes | 7 | **1968**, **1969**, **1970**, **1971**, 1983, **2009**, **2026** |
| (Brazil) Internacional | 7 | 1977, **1980**, 1989, **2006**, **2010**, 2015, 2023 |
| (Brazil) Cruzeiro | 6 | 1967, 1975, **1976**, **1977**, **1997**, **2009** |
| (Paraguay) Cerro Porteño | 6 | 1973, 1978, 1993, 1998, 1999, 2011 |
| (Colombia) Atlético Nacional | 5 | **1989**, 1990, 1991, **1995**, **2016** |
| (Chile) Colo-Colo | 5 | 1964, 1967, **1973**, **1991**, 1997 |
| (Chile) Universidad Católica | 5 | 1962, 1966, 1969, 1984, **1993** |
| (Brazil) Atlético Mineiro | 4 | 1978, **2013**, 2021, **2024** |
| (Argentina) Vélez Sársfield | 4 | 1980, **1994**, 2011, 2022 |
| (Argentina) San Lorenzo | 4 | 1960, 1973, 1988, **2014** |
| (Argentina) Racing | 4 | **1967**, 1968, 1997, 2025 |
| (Ecuador) LDU Quito | 4 | 1975, 1976, **2008**, 2025 |
| (Colombia) Deportivo Cali | 4 | 1977, **1978**, 1981, **1999** |
| (Peru) Universitario | 4 | 1967, 1971, **1972**, 1975 |
| Universidad de Chile | 4 | 1970, 1996, 2010, 2012 |
| (Brazil) Fluminense | 3 | **2008**, **2023**, 2026 |
| (Brazil) Botafogo | 3 | 1963, 1973, **2024** |
| (Argentina) Newell's Old Boys | 3 | **1988**, **1992**, 2013 |
| (Chile) Cobreloa | 3 | **1981**, **1982**, 1987 |
| (Mexico) Guadalajara | 3 | 2005, 2006, **2010** |
| (Mexico) América | 3 | 2000, 2002, 2008 |
| (Colombia) Millonarios | 3 | 1960, 1973, 1974 |
| (Brazil) Corinthians | 2 | 2000, **2012** |
| (Argentina) Argentinos Juniors | 2 | **1985**, 1986 |
| (Brazil) Athletico Paranaense | 2 | **2005**, **2022** |
| (Chile) Unión Española | 2 | 1971, **1975** |
| (Bolivia) Bolívar | 2 | 1986, 2014 |
| (Paraguay) Libertad | 2 | 1977, 2006 |
| (Paraguay) Guaraní | 2 | 1966, 2015 |
| (Argentina) Rosario Central | 2 | 1975, 2001 |
| (Colombia) Santa Fe | 2 | 1961, 2013 |
| (Peru) Alianza Lima | 2 | 1976, 1978 |
| (Brazil) Vasco da Gama | 1 | **1998** |
| (Colombia) Once Caldas | 1 | **2004** |
| (Peru) Sporting Cristal | 1 | **1997** |
| (Brazil) São Caetano | 1 | **2002** |
| (Argentina) Lanús | 1 | **2017** |
| (Mexico) Tigres UANL | 1 | **2015** |
| (Mexico) Cruz Azul | 1 | **2001** |
| (Ecuador) Independiente del Valle | 1 | **2016** |
| (Paraguay) Nacional | 1 | **2014** |
| (Peru) Defensor Lima | 1 | 1974 |
| (Argentina) Huracán | 1 | 1974 |
| (Venezuela) Portuguesa | 1 | 1977 |
| (Brazil) Guarani | 1 | 1979 |
| (Chile) Palestino | 1 | 1979 |
| (Chile) O'Higgins | 1 | 1980 |
| (Bolivia) Jorge Wilstermann | 1 | 1981 |
| (Colombia) Deportes Tolima | 1 | 1982 |
| (Venezuela) San Cristóbal | 1 | 1983 |
| (Venezuela) Universidad de Los Andes | 1 | 1984 |
| (Bolivia) Blooming | 1 | 1985 |
| (Ecuador) El Nacional | 1 | 1985 |
| (Uruguay) Danubio | 1 | 1989 |
| (Colombia) Junior | 1 | 1994 |
| (Ecuador) Emelec | 1 | 1995 |
| (Colombia) Independiente Medellín | 1 | 2003 |
| (Colombia) Cúcuta Deportivo | 1 | 2007 |
| (Uruguay) Defensor Sporting | 1 | 2014 |

Clubs were finalists in years that are in bold.

==== By country ====
| Country | Semi-finals | Number of clubs | Clubs |
|---|---|---|---|
| Brazil | 80 | 15 | Palmeiras (13), São Paulo (10), Grêmio (10), Santos (9), Flamengo (8), Internacional (7), Cruzeiro (6), Atlético Mineiro (4),Fluminense (3), Botafogo (3), Corinthians (2), Athletico Paranaense (2), Vasco da Gama (1), São Caetano (1), Guarani (1) |
| Argentina | 80 | 12 | River Plate (21), Boca Juniors (19), Independiente (12), Estudiantes (7), San Lorenzo (4), Racing (4), Vélez Sársfield (4), Newell's Old Boys (3), Argentinos Juniors (2), Rosario Central (2), Huracan (1), Lanús (1) |
| Uruguay | 36 | 4 | Peñarol (21), Nacional (13), Danubio (1), Defensor Sporting (1) |
| Colombia | 29 | 10 | América de Cali (10), Atlético Nacional (5), Deportivo Cali (4), Millonarios (3), Santa Fe (2), Junior (1), Once Caldas (1), Cúcuta Deportivo (1), Independiente Medellín (1), Deportes Tolima (1) |
| Paraguay | 23 | 5 | Olimpia (12), Cerro Porteño (6), Libertad (2), Guaraní (2), Nacional (1) |
| Chile | 21 | 7 | Universidad Católica (5), Colo-Colo (5), Universidad de Chile (4), Cobreloa (3), Unión Española (2), Palestino (1), O'Higgins (1) |
| Ecuador | 16 | 5 | Barcelona (9), LDU Quito (4), El Nacional (1), Emelec (1), Independiente del Valle (1) |
| Peru | 8 | 4 | Universitario (4), Alianza Lima (2), Sporting Cristal (1), Defensor Lima (1) |
| Mexico | 8 | 4 | Guadalajara (3), América (3), Cruz Azul (1), UANL (1) |
| Bolivia | 4 | 3 | Bolívar (2), Jorge Wilstermann (1), Blooming (1) |
| Venezuela | 3 | 3 | Portuguesa (1), Universidad de Los Andes (1), San Cristóbal (1) |

=== By quarter-final appearances ===
| Club | No. | Years in quarter-finals |
|---|---|---|
| (Argentina) River Plate | 20 | 1970, 1990, 1995, 1996, 1998, 1999, 2000, 2001, 2003, 2004, 2005, 2006, 2015, 2017, 2018, 2019, 2020, 2021, 2024, 2025 |
| (Argentina) Boca Juniors | 17 | 1970, 1991, 2000, 2001, 2002, 2003, 2004, 2005, 2007, 2008, 2012, 2013, 2016, 2018, 2019, 2020, 2023 |
| (Brazil) Palmeiras | 14 | 1968, 1995, 1999, 2000, 2001, 2009, 2018, 2019, 2020, 2021, 2022, 2023, 2025, 2026 |
| (Brazil) São Paulo | 13 | 1992, 1993, 1994, 2004, 2005, 2006, 2008, 2009, 2010, 2016, 2021, 2024, 2025 |
| (Brazil) Grêmio | 12 | 1995, 1996, 1997, 1998, 2002, 2003, 2007, 2009, 2017, 2018, 2019, 2020 |
| (Paraguay) Olimpia | 10 | 1969, 1989, 1990, 1991, 1993, 1994, 2002, 2013, 2021, 2023 |
| (Uruguay) Peñarol | 9 | 1968, 1969, 1970, 1988, 1997, 1998, 2002, 2011, 2024 |
| (Uruguay) Nacional | 9 | 1969, 1970, 1988, 1991, 2002, 2007, 2009, 2016, 2020 |
| (Brazil) Flamengo | 9 | 1991, 1993, 2010, 2019, 2021, 2022, 2024, 2025, 2026 |
| (Brazil) Santos | 9 | 2003, 2004, 2005, 2007, 2008, 2011, 2012, 2017, 2020 |
| (Paraguay) Cerro Porteño | 8 | 1969, 1991, 1992, 1993, 1998, 1999, 2011, 2019 |
| (Argentina) Vélez Sársfield | 8 | 1994, 1995, 1999, 2006, 2011, 2012, 2022, 2025 |
| (Argentina) Estudiantes | 7 | 1968, 2006, 2009, 2010, 2022, 2025, 2026 |
| (Colombia) América de Cali | 7 | 1988, 1991, 1992, 1993, 1996, 2001, 2003 |
| (Colombia) Atlético Nacional | 7 | 1989, 1990, 1991, 1992, 1995, 2014, 2016 |
| (Ecuador) Barcelona | 7 | 1990, 1992, 1993, 1996, 1998, 2017, 2021 |
| (Brazil) Cruzeiro | 7 | 1997, 2001, 2009, 2010, 2014, 2015, 2018 |
| (Brazil) Fluminense | 7 | 2008, 2012, 2013, 2021, 2023, 2024, 2026 |
| (Chile) Universidad Católica | 6 | 1968, 1969, 1990, 1993, 1997, 2011 |
| (Argentina) San Lorenzo | 6 | 1988, 1992, 1996, 2008, 2014, 2017 |
| (Brazil) Internacional | 6 | 1989, 2006, 2010, 2015, 2019, 2023 |
| (Bolivia) Bolívar | 6 | 1994, 1997, 1998, 2000, 2014, 2023 |
| (Brazil) Atlético Mineiro | 6 | 2000, 2013, 2016, 2021, 2022, 2024 |
| (Paraguay) Libertad | 6 | 2006, 2007, 2010, 2011, 2012, 2020 |
| (Ecuador) LDU Quito | 6 | 1970, 2006, 2008, 2019, 2025, 2026 |
| (Brazil) Corinthians | 6 | 1996, 1999, 2000, 2012, 2022, 2026 |
| (Argentina) Racing | 5 | 1997, 2015, 2020, 2023, 2025 |
| (Ecuador) Emelec | 4 | 1968, 1990, 1995, 2015 |
| (Peru) Sporting Cristal | 4 | 1968, 1993, 1995, 1997 |
| Universidad de Chile | 4 | 1970, 1996, 2010, 2012 |
| (Brazil) Vasco da Gama | 4 | 1990, 1998, 2001, 2012 |
| (Chile) Colo-Colo | 4 | 1991, 1997, 2018, 2024 |
| (Mexico) América | 4 | 2000, 2002, 2007, 2008 |
| (Paraguay) Guaraní | 3 | 1968, 1970, 2015 |
| (Argentina) Independiente | 3 | 1968, 1990, 2018 |
| (Colombia) Deportivo Cali | 3 | 1969, 1999, 2004 |
| (Argentina) Newell's Old Boys | 3 | 1988, 1992, 2013 |
| (Mexico) Guadalajara | 3 | 2005, 2006, 2010 |
| (Uruguay) Defensor Sporting | 3 | 2007, 2009, 2014 |
| (Peru) Universitario | 2 | 1968, 1970 |
| (Colombia) Millonarios | 2 | 1989, 1995 |
| (Chile) Cobreloa | 2 | 1989, 2003 |
| (Colombia) Junior | 2 | 1994, 1996 |
| (Colombia) Independiente Medellín | 2 | 1994, 2003 |
| (Mexico) Atlas | 2 | 2000, 2008 |
| (Mexico) Cruz Azul | 2 | 2001, 2003 |
| (Argentina) Rosario Central | 2 | 2001, 2016 |
| (Brazil) São Caetano | 2 | 2002, 2004 |
| (Colombia) Once Caldas | 2 | 2004, 2011 |
| (Mexico) UANL | 2 | 2005, 2015 |
| (Brazil) Athletico Parananense | 2 | 2005, 2022 |
| (Colombia) Santa Fe | 2 | 2013, 2015 |
| (Argentina) Lanús | 2 | 2014, 2017 |
| (Ecuador) Independiente del Valle | 2 | 2016, 2026 |
| (Brazil) Botafogo | 2 | 2017, 2024 |
| (Venezuela) Portugués | 1 | 1968 |
| (Venezuela) Deportivo Italia | 1 | 1969 |
| (Chile) Santiago Wanderers | 1 | 1969 |
| (Bolivia) Oriente Petrolero | 1 | 1988 |
| (Brazil) Bahia | 1 | 1989 |
| (Uruguay) Danubio | 1 | 1989 |
| (Paraguay) Sol de América | 1 | 1989 |
| (Brazil) Criciúma | 1 | 1992 |
| (Venezuela) Minervén | 1 | 1994 |
| (Chile) Unión Española | 1 | 1994 |
| (Argentina) Colón | 1 | 1998 |
| (Uruguay) Bella Vista | 1 | 1999 |
| (Venezuela) Estudiantes | 1 | 1999 |
| (Mexico) Morelia | 1 | 2002 |
| (Venezuela) Deportivo Táchira | 1 | 2004 |
| (Argentina) Banfield | 1 | 2005 |
| (Colombia) Cúcuta Deportivo | 1 | 2007 |
| (Venezuela) Caracas | 1 | 2009 |
| (Mexico) Jaguares | 1 | 2011 |
| (Peru) Cusco | 1 | 2013 |
| (Mexico) Tijuana | 1 | 2013 |
| (Argentina) Arsenal | 1 | 2014 |
| (Paraguay) Nacional | 1 | 2014 |
| (Mexico) UNAM | 1 | 2016 |
| (Bolivia) Jorge Wilstermann | 1 | 2017 |
| (Argentina) Atlético Tucumán | 1 | 2018 |
| (Argentina) Talleres | 1 | 2022 |
| (Colombia) Deportivo Pereira | 1 | 2023 |
| (Argentina) Platense | 1 | 2026 |

- Note: 1) In 1960 and 1961, the tournament started in this round, so teams are not marked as quarter-finalists in the table. 2) From 1962 to 1965, no quarter-finals were played as the tournament had a first stage which consisted of three groups where the winners of each group advanced to semi-finals with the winners of the previous edition. 3) In 1966 and 1967, no quarter-finals were played as the tournament had a first stage with several groups of four, five, six or even seven teams, where the two best teams of each group advanced to semi-finals with the winner of the previous edition. 4) From 1968 to 1970, no quarter-finals were played as the tournament had a first stage with several groups of four or six teams, where the two best teams of each group advanced to the second stage with several groups of two, three or four teams, where the winners of each group advanced to the semi-finals with the winner of the previous edition. 5) From 1971 to 1987, no quarter-finals were played as the tournament had a first stage with five groups of four teams, where the winners of each group advanced to the semi-finals with the winner of the previous edition.

==== By country ====
| Country | Quarter-finals | Number of clubs | Clubs |
|---|---|---|---|
| Brazil | 101 | 16 | Palmeiras (14), São Paulo (13), Grêmio (12), Santos (9), Flamengo (9), Cruzeiro (7), Fluminense (7), Internacional (6), Atlético Mineiro (6), Corinthians (6), Vasco da Gama (4), São Caetano (2), Athletico Paranaense (2), Botafogo (2), Bahia (1), Criciúma (1) |
| Argentina | 79 | 16 | River Plate (20), Boca Juniors (17), Vélez Sársfield (8), Estudiantes (7), San Lorenzo (6), Racing (5), Independiente (3), Newell's Old Boys (3), Lanús (2), Rosario Central (2), Arsenal (1), Atlético Tucumán (1), Banfield (1), Colón (1), Talleres (1), Platense (1) |
| Colombia | 29 | 10 | América de Cali (7), Atlético Nacional (7), Deportivo Cali (3), Independiente Medellín (2), Junior (2), Millonarios (2), Once Caldas (2), Santa Fe (2), Cúcuta Deportivo (1), Deportivo Pereira (1) |
| Paraguay | 29 | 6 | Olimpia (10), Cerro Porteño (8), Libertad (6), Guaraní (3), Nacional (1), Sol de América (1) |
| Uruguay | 23 | 5 | Peñarol (9), Nacional (9), Defensor Sporting (3), Bella Vista (1), Danubio (1) |
| Ecuador | 19 | 4 | Barcelona (7), LDU Quito (6), Emelec (4), Independiente del Valle (2) |
| Chile | 18 | 6 | Universidad Católica (6), Universidad de Chile (4), Colo-Colo (4), Cobreloa (2), Santiago Wanderers (1), Unión Española (1) |
| Mexico | 17 | 9 | América (4), Guadalajara (3), Atlas (2), Cruz Azul (2), UANL (2), Jaguares (1), Morelia (1), Tijuana (1), UNAM (1) |
| Bolivia | 8 | 3 | Bolívar (6), Jorge Wilstermann (1), Oriente Petrolero (1) |
| Peru | 7 | 3 | Sporting Cristal (4), Universitario (2), Cusco (1) |
| Venezuela | 6 | 6 | Caracas (1), Deportivo Italia (1), Deportivo Táchira (1), Estudiantes (1), Minervén (1), Portugués (1) |

=== By round of 16 appearances ===
| Club | No. | Years in round of 16 |
|---|---|---|
| (Uruguay) Nacional | 25 | 1988, 1989, 1991, 1992, 1993, 1997, 1998, 1999, 2000, 2001, 2002, 2003, 2004, 2006, 2007, 2008, 2009, 2010, 2013, 2016, 2017, 2019, 2020, 2023, 2024 |
| (Argentina) River Plate | 25 | 1990, 1995, 1996, 1997, 1998, 1999, 2000, 2001, 2002, 2003, 2004, 2005, 2006, 2008, 2015, 2016, 2017, 2018, 2019, 2020, 2021, 2022, 2023, 2024, 2025 |
| (Argentina) Boca Juniors | 21 | 1989, 1991, 2000, 2001, 2002, 2003, 2004, 2005, 2007, 2008, 2009, 2012, 2013, 2015, 2016, 2018, 2019, 2020, 2021, 2022, 2023 |
| (Paraguay) Cerro Porteño | 21 | 1990, 1991, 1992, 1993, 1995, 1996, 1998, 1999, 2000, 2001, 2003, 2005, 2011, 2014, 2016, 2018, 2019, 2021, 2022, 2025, 2026 |
| (Brazil) Palmeiras | 19 | 1994, 1995, 1999, 2000, 2001, 2005, 2006, 2009, 2013, 2017, 2018, 2019, 2020, 2021, 2022, 2023, 2024, 2025, 2026 |
| (Brazil) Grêmio | 17 | 1995, 1996, 1997, 1998, 2002, 2003, 2007, 2009, 2011, 2013, 2014, 2016, 2017, 2018, 2019, 2020, 2024 |
| (Brazil) São Paulo | 16 | 1992, 1993, 1994, 2004, 2005, 2006, 2007, 2008, 2009, 2010, 2013, 2015, 2016, 2021, 2024, 2025 |
| (Colombia) Atlético Nacional | 15 | 1989, 1990, 1991, 1992, 1993, 1995, 2006, 2008, 2012, 2014, 2015, 2016, 2018, 2023, 2025 |
| (Bolivia) Bolívar | 14 | 1988, 1989, 1991, 1992, 1993, 1994, 1995, 1997, 1998, 2000, 2012, 2014, 2023, 2024 |
| (Brazil) Flamengo | 14 | 1991, 1993, 2007, 2008, 2010, 2018, 2019, 2020, 2021, 2022, 2023, 2024, 2025, 2026 |
| (Brazil) Corinthians | 14 | 1991, 1996, 1999, 2000, 2003, 2006, 2010, 2012, 2013, 2015, 2016, 2018, 2022, 2026 |
| (Argentina) Vélez Sársfield | 14 | 1994, 1995, 1997, 1999, 2006, 2007, 2010, 2011, 2012, 2013, 2014, 2021, 2022, 2025 |
| (Brazil) Cruzeiro | 14 | 1994, 1997, 1998, 2001, 2004, 2008, 2009, 2010, 2011, 2014, 2015, 2018, 2019, 2026 |
| (Paraguay) Olimpia | 13 | 1989, 1990, 1991, 1993, 1994, 1995, 1998, 2002, 2003, 2013, 2019, 2021, 2023 |
| (Uruguay) Peñarol | 11 | 1988, 1989, 1995, 1996, 1997, 1998, 2000, 2002, 2011, 2024, 2025 |
| (Chile) Colo-Colo | 11 | 1988, 1990, 1991, 1992, 1994, 1997, 1998, 1999, 2007, 2018, 2024 |
| (Chile) Universidad Católica | 11 | 1988, 1990, 1992, 1993, 1995, 1997, 1999, 2002, 2011, 2021, 2026 |
| (Brazil) Internacional | 11 | 1989, 2006, 2010, 2011, 2012, 2015, 2019, 2020, 2021, 2023, 2025 |
| (Ecuador) Emelec | 11 | 1990, 1994, 1995, 1999, 2001, 2012, 2013, 2015, 2017, 2019, 2022 |
| (Ecuador) LDU Quito | 11 | 1991, 1999, 2004, 2005, 2006, 2008, 2011, 2019, 2020, 2025, 2026 |
| (Paraguay) Libertad | 11 | 2006, 2007, 2009, 2010, 2011, 2012, 2018, 2019, 2020, 2022, 2025 |
| (Colombia) América de Cali | 10 | 1988, 1991, 1992, 1993, 1996, 1998, 2000, 2001, 2002, 2003 |
| (Argentina) Racing | 10 | 1989, 1997, 2003, 2015, 2016, 2018, 2020, 2021, 2023, 2025 |
| (Brazil) Atlético Mineiro | 10 | 2000, 2013, 2014, 2015, 2016, 2017, 2021, 2022, 2023, 2024 |
| (Brazil) Santos | 10 | 2003, 2004, 2005, 2007, 2008, 2011, 2012, 2017, 2018, 2020 |
| (Argentina) Estudiantes | 10 | 2006, 2008, 2009, 2010, 2011, 2015, 2018, 2022, 2025, 2026 |
| (Ecuador) Barcelona | 9 | 1990, 1992, 1993, 1994, 1996, 1998, 2004, 2017, 2021 |
| (Peru) Universitario | 8 | 1988, 1989, 1991, 1993, 1994, 1999, 2010, 2025 |
| (Argentina) San Lorenzo | 8 | 1988, 1992, 1996, 2008, 2014, 2017, 2019, 2024 |
| (Brazil) Fluminense | 8 | 2008, 2011, 2012, 2013, 2021, 2023, 2024, 2026 |
| (Uruguay) Defensor Sporting | 7 | 1990, 1993, 1994, 1996, 2007, 2009, 2014 |
| (Colombia) Junior | 7 | 1994, 1996, 2000, 2001, 2005, 2011, 2024 |
| (Mexico) América | 7 | 1998, 2000, 2002, 2004, 2007, 2008, 2011 |
| (Brazil) Athletico Parananense | 7 | 2000, 2005, 2017, 2019, 2020, 2022, 2023 |
| (Peru) Sporting Cristal | 6 | 1992, 1993, 1995, 1996, 1997. 2004 |
| (Argentina) Newell's Old Boys | 5 | 1988, 1992, 1993, 2006, 2013 |
| (Chile) Cobreloa | 5 | 1989, 1993, 2001, 2002, 2003 |
| (Bolivia) The Strongest | 5 | 1990, 1994, 2014, 2017, 2024 |
| (Brazil) Vasco da Gama | 5 | 1990, 1998, 1999, 2001, 2012 |
| (Ecuador) El Nacional | 5 | 1993, 1997, 2000, 2001, 2002 |
| Universidad de Chile | 5 | 1996, 2005, 2009, 2010, 2012 |
| (Argentina) Rosario Central | 5 | 2000, 2001, 2004, 2016, 2026 |
| (Venezuela) Deportivo Táchira | 4 | 1989, 1991, 2004, 2016 |
| (Venezuela) Minervén | 4 | 1993, 1994, 1996, 1997 |
| (Brazil) Botafogo | 4 | 1996, 2017, 2024, 2025 |
| (Paraguay) Guaraní | 4 | 1997, 2015, 2017, 2020 |
| (Colombia) Once Caldas | 4 | 2004, 2005, 2010, 2011 |
| (Mexico) Guadalajara | 4 | 2005, 2006, 2009, 2010 |
| (Argentina) Lanús | 4 | 2008, 2012, 2014, 2017 |
| (Ecuador) Independiente del Valle | 4 | 2016, 2020, 2023, 2026 |
| (Bolivia) Oriente Petrolero | 3 | 1988, 1991, 1997 |
| (Colombia) Millonarios | 3 | 1989, 1995, 1997 |
| (Argentina) Independiente | 3 | 1990, 1995, 2018 |
| (Colombia) Independiente Medellín | 3 | 1994, 2003, 2005 |
| (Chile) Union Española | 3 | 1994, 2012, 2014 |
| (Peru) Alianza Lima | 3 | 1995, 1998, 2010 |
| (Venezuela) Caracas | 3 | 1995, 2007, 2009 |
| (Colombia) Deportivo Cali | 3 | 1999, 2003, 2004 |
| (Bolivia) Jorge Wilstermann | 3 | 1999, 2017, 2020 |
| (Brazil) São Caetano | 3 | 2001, 2002, 2004 |
| (Mexico) Cruz Azul | 3 | 2001, 2003, 2012 |
| (Mexico) UANL | 3 | 2005, 2006, 2015 |
| (Colombia) Santa Fe | 3 | 2006, 2013, 2015 |
| (Ecuador) Deportivo Quito | 2 | 1989, 2012 |
| (Chile) Deportes Concepción | 2 | 1991, 2001 |
| (Argentina) Colón | 2 | 1998, 2022 |
| (Mexico) Atlas | 2 | 2000, 2008 |
| (Uruguay) Montevideo Wanderers | 2 | 2002, 2015 |
| (Mexico) UNAM | 2 | 2003, 2016 |
| (Mexico) Santos Laguna | 2 | 2004, 2014 |
| (Argentina) Banfield | 2 | 2005, 2010 |
| (Colombia) Cúcuta Deportivo | 2 | 2007, 2008 |
| (Mexico) Toluca | 2 | 2007, 2016 |
| (Mexico) San Luis | 2 | 2009, 2010 |
| (Argentina) Godoy Cruz | 2 | 2017, 2019 |
| (Argentina) Argentinos Juniors | 2 | 2021, 2023 |
| (Argentina) Talleres | 2 | 2022, 2024 |
| (Brazil) Fortaleza | 2 | 2022, 2025 |
| (Colombia) Deportes Tolima | 2 | 2022, 2026 |
| (Brazil) Guarani | 1 | 1988 |
| (Brazil) Bahia | 1 | 1989 |
| (Uruguay) Danubio | 1 | 1989 |
| (Paraguay) Sol de América | 1 | 1989 |
| (Venezuela) Pepeganga Margarita | 1 | 1990 |
| (Uruguay) Progreso | 1 | 1990 |
| (Peru) Unión Huaral | 1 | 1990 |
| (Paraguay) Colegiales | 1 | 1991 |
| (Brazil) Criciúma | 1 | 1992 |
| (Venezuela) Marítimo | 1 | 1992 |
| (Ecuador) Valdez | 1 | 1992 |
| (Ecuador) ESPOLI | 1 | 1996 |
| (Bolivia) San José | 1 | 1996 |
| (Colombia) Atlético Bucaramanga | 1 | 1998 |
| (Uruguay) Bella Vista | 1 | 1999 |
| (Venezuela) Estudiantes de Mérida | 1 | 1999 |
| (Peru) Cienciano | 1 | 2002 |
| (Mexico) Morelia | 1 | 2002 |
| (Ecuador) Olmedo | 1 | 2002 |
| (Brazil) Paysandu | 1 | 2003 |
| (Mexico) Pachuca | 1 | 2005 |
| (Brazil) Goiás | 1 | 2006 |
| (Mexico) Necaxa | 1 | 2007 |
| (Brazil) Paraná | 1 | 2007 |
| (Ecuador) Deportivo Cuenca | 1 | 2009 |
| (Brazil) Sport | 1 | 2009 |
| (Peru) Universidad San Martín | 1 | 2009 |
| (Mexico) Jaguares | 1 | 2011 |
| (Peru) Cusco | 1 | 2013 |
| (Argentina) Tigre | 1 | 2013 |
| (Mexico) Tijuana | 1 | 2013 |
| (Argentina) Arsenal | 1 | 2014 |
| (Mexico) León | 1 | 2014 |
| (Paraguay) Nacional | 1 | 2014 |
| (Bolivia) Universitario | 1 | 2015 |
| (Argentina) Huracán | 1 | 2016 |
| (Argentina) Atlético Tucumán | 1 | 2018 |
| (Ecuador) Delfín | 1 | 2020 |
| (Argentina) Defensa y Justicia | 1 | 2021 |
| (Colombia) Deportivo Pereira | 1 | 2023 |
| (Chile) Coquimbo Unido | 1 | 2026 |
| (Argentina) Independiente Rivadavia | 1 | 2026 |
| (Brazil) Mirassol | 1 | 2026 |
| (Argentina) Platense | 1 | 2026 |

- Note: 1) From 1960 to 1987, no round of 16 was played because of the format of the tournament, or because of the lack of teams.

==== By country ====
| Country | Round of 16 | Number of clubs | Clubs |
|---|---|---|---|
| Brazil | 162 | 23 | Palmeiras (19), Grêmio (17), São Paulo (16), Corinthians (14), Flamengo (14), Cruzeiro (14), Internacional (11), Santos (10), Atlético Mineiro (10), Fluminense (8), Athletico Paranaense (7), Vasco da Gama (5), Botafogo (4), São Caetano (3), Fortaleza (2), Bahia (1), Criciúma (1), Goiás (1), Guarani (1), Paraná (1), Paysandu (1), Sport (1), Mirassol (1) |
| Argentina | 122 | 22 | River Plate (25), Boca Juniors (21), Vélez Sársfield (14), Racing (10), Estudiantes (10), San Lorenzo (8), Newell's Old Boys (5), Rosario Central (5), Lanús (4), Independiente (3), Banfield (2), Godoy Cruz (2), Colón (2), Argentinos Juniors (2), Talleres (2), Arsenal (1), Atlético Tucumán (1), Huracán (1), Tigre (1), Defensa y Justicia (1), Independiente Rivadavia (1), Platense (1) |
| Colombia | 54 | 12 | Atlético Nacional (15), América de Cali (10), Junior (7), Once Caldas (4), Deportivo Cali (3), Independiente Medellín (3), Millonarios (3), Santa Fe (3), Cúcuta Deportivo (2), Deportes Tolima (2), Atlético Bucaramanga (1), Deportivo Pereira (1) |
| Paraguay | 52 | 7 | Cerro Porteño (21), Olimpia (13), Libertad (11), Guaraní (4), Colegiales (1), Nacional (1), Sol de América (1) |
| Uruguay | 48 | 7 | Nacional (25), Peñarol (11), Defensor Sporting (7), Montevideo Wanderers (2), Bella Vista (1), Danubio (1), Progreso (1) |
| Ecuador | 47 | 11 | Emelec (11), LDU Quito (11), Barcelona (9), El Nacional (5), Independiente del Valle (4), Deportivo Quito (2), Deportivo Cuenca (1), ESPOLI (1), Olmedo (1), Valdez (1), Delfín (1) |
| Chile | 38 | 7 | Colo-Colo (11), Universidad Católica (11), Cobreloa (5), Universidad de Chile (5), Unión Española (3), Deportes Concepción (2), Coquimbo Unido (1) |
| Mexico | 33 | 15 | América (7), Guadalajara (4), Cruz Azul (3), UANL (3), Atlas (2), San Luis (2), Santos Laguna (2), Toluca (2), UNAM (2), Jaguares (1), León (1), Morelia (1), Necaxa (1), Pachuca (1), Tijuana (1) |
| Bolivia | 27 | 6 | Bolivar (14), The Strongest (5), Oriente Petrolero (3), Jorge Wilstermann (3), San José (1), Universitario (1) |
| Peru | 21 | 7 | Universitario (8), Sporting Cristal (6), Alianza Lima (3), Cienciano (1), Cusco (1), Unión Huaral (1), Universidad San Martín (1) |
| Venezuela | 14 | 6 | Deportivo Táchira (4), Minervén (4), Caracas (3), Estudiantes de Mérida (1), Marítimo (1), Pepeganga Margarita (1) |

=== Specific group stage records ===
==== Best group stage ====
| # | Year | Club | Points | Pld | W | D | L | GF | GA | GD |
|---|---|---|---|---|---|---|---|---|---|---|
| 1 | 2022 | (Brazil) Palmeiras | 18 | 6 | 6 | 0 | 0 | 25 | 3 | +22 |
| 2 | 2015 | (Argentina) Boca Juniors | 18 | 6 | 6 | 0 | 0 | 19 | 2 | +17 |
| 3 | 2025 | (Brazil) Palmeiras | 18 | 6 | 6 | 0 | 0 | 17 | 4 | +13 |
| 4 | 2001 | (Brazil) Vasco da Gama | 18 | 6 | 6 | 0 | 0 | 16 | 5 | +11 |
| 5 | 2007 | (Brazil) Santos | 18 | 6 | 6 | 0 | 0 | 12 | 1 | +11 |

==== Worst group stage ====
| # | Year | Club | Points | Pld | W | D | L | GF | GA | GD |
|---|---|---|---|---|---|---|---|---|---|---|
| 1 | 2015 | (Venezuela) Zamora | 0 | 6 | 0 | 0 | 6 | 3 | 21 | −18 |
| 2 | 1979 | (Bolivia) Jorge Wilstermann | 0 | 6 | 0 | 0 | 6 | 5 | 21 | −16 |
| 3 | 1979 | (Peru) Alianza Lima | 0 | 6 | 0 | 0 | 6 | 5 | 20 | −15 |
| 4 | 2017 | (Venezuela) Zamora | 0 | 6 | 0 | 0 | 6 | 6 | 20 | −14 |
| 5 | 2011 | (Paraguay) Guaraní | 0 | 6 | 0 | 0 | 6 | 2 | 16 | −14 |
| 5 | 1970 | (Venezuela) Galicia | 0 | 6 | 0 | 0 | 6 | 2 | 16 | −14 |
| 7 | 1987 | (Venezuela) Estudiantes de Mérida | 0 | 6 | 0 | 0 | 6 | 4 | 17 | −13 |
| 8 | 1985 | (Peru) Sport Boys | 0 | 5 | 0 | 0 | 5 | 1 | 14 | −13 |
| 9 | 2009 | (Bolivia) Aurora | 0 | 6 | 0 | 0 | 6 | 3 | 15 | −12 |
| 9 | 2004 | (Chile) Cobreloa | 0 | 6 | 0 | 0 | 6 | 3 | 15 | −12 |
| 9 | 1976 | (Venezuela) Galicia | 0 | 6 | 0 | 0 | 6 | 3 | 15 | −12 |
| 12 | 2007 | (Colombia) Deportivo Pasto | 0 | 6 | 0 | 0 | 6 | 3 | 14 | −11 |
| 13 | 2007 | (Peru) Alianza Lima | 0 | 6 | 0 | 0 | 6 | 2 | 13 | −11 |
| 14 | 1974 | (Chile) Colo-Colo | 0 | 6 | 0 | 0 | 6 | 3 | 13 | −10 |
| 15 | 2016 | (Peru) Melgar | 0 | 6 | 0 | 0 | 0 | 2 | 12 | −10 |
| 16 | 2002 | (Peru) Sporting Cristal | 0 | 6 | 0 | 0 | 6 | 5 | 14 | −9 |
| 17 | 2026 | (Paraguay) Libertad | 0 | 6 | 0 | 0 | 6 | 4 | 13 | −9 |
| 18 | 1982 | (Peru) Deportivo Municipal | 0 | 6 | 0 | 0 | 6 | 3 | 12 | −9 |
| 19 | 1980 | (Venezuela) Deportivo Táchira | 0 | 6 | 0 | 0 | 6 | 0 | 9 | −9 |
| 20 | 2025 | (Venezuela) Deportivo Táchira | 0 | 6 | 0 | 0 | 6 | 4 | 11 | −7 |
| 20 | 2023 | (Venezuela) Metropolitanos | 0 | 6 | 0 | 0 | 6 | 4 | 11 | −7 |

=== Unbeaten sides ===
- Seven clubs have won the Copa Libertadores unbeaten, with one of them doing so twice:
  - Estudiantes had four wins and zero draws in 1969, and three wins and one draw in 1970.
- The other unbeaten sides are:
  - Peñarol with three wins and four draws in 1960
  - Santos with three wins and one draw in 1963
  - Independiente with five wins and two draws in 1964
  - Boca Juniors with four wins and two draws in 1978
  - Corinthians with eight wins and six draws in 2012
  - Flamengo with twelve wins and one draw in 2022
- The record for the most consecutive unbeaten games is hold by Atlético Mineiro between 2019 and 2022 and Palmeiras between 2021 and 2022 with 18 unbeaten games.

=== Finals success rate ===
Only one club has appeared in the finals of the Copa Libertadores more than once with a 100% success rate:

- Independiente (1964, 1965, 1972, 1973, 1974, 1975 and 1984)

Nine clubs have appeared in the final once, being victorious on that occasion:

- Racing (1967)
- Argentinos Juniors (1985)
- Vélez Sársfield (1994)
- Vasco da Gama (1998)
- Once Caldas (2004)
- LDU Quito (2008)
- Corinthians (2012)
- San Lorenzo (2014)
- Botafogo (2024)

On the other end, eighteen clubs have appeared in the finals and have never won the tournament. Five of those clubs have appeared in the finals more than once, losing on each occasion:

- América de Cali (1985, 1986, 1987 and 1996)
- Deportivo Cali (1978 and 1999)
- Cobreloa (1981 and 1982)
- Newell's Old Boys (1988 and 1992)
- Barcelona (1990 and 1998)
- Athletico Paranaense (2005 and 2022)

=== Consecutive participations ===
Nacional have the record number of consecutive participations, with 29 from 1997 to 2025.

=== Consecutive finals ===
Two clubs have appeared in a record four consecutive finals:

- Estudiantes (1968, 1969, 1970 and 1971)
- Independiente (1972, 1973, 1974 and 1975)

=== Defending the trophy ===
==== Successful title-holder campaigns ====
As of 2021, 12 of the 61 attempts to defend the trophy (19.6%) have been successful, and this has been accomplished by seven clubs. Until 1999, the title-holders started the competition in the second stage (sometimes third, depending on the format). Since then, only Boca Juniors (in 2001) and Palmeiras (in 2021) have defended their title in the current format, with the previous year's champions starting the tournament in the group stage.

| Defended | Attempts | Club | Year | Pld | W | D | L | GF | GA | GD |
|---|---|---|---|---|---|---|---|---|---|---|
| 4 | 7 | (Argentina) Independiente | 1965 | 6 | 3 | 1 | 2 | 8 | 5 | +3 |
| 4 | 7 | (Argentina) Independiente | 1973 | 7 | 3 | 3 | 1 | 8 | 5 | +3 |
| 4 | 7 | (Argentina) Independiente | 1974 | 7 | 4 | 2 | 1 | 12 | 6 | +6 |
| 4 | 7 | (Argentina) Independiente | 1975 | 7 | 4 | 0 | 3 | 10 | 6 | +4 |
| 2 | 4 | (Argentina) Estudiantes | 1969 | 4 | 4 | 0 | 0 | 9 | 2 | +7 |
| 2 | 4 | (Argentina) Estudiantes | 1970 | 4 | 3 | 1 | 0 | 5 | 1 | +4 |
| 2 | 6 | (Argentina) Boca Juniors | 1978 | 6 | 4 | 2 | 0 | 11 | 2 | +9 |
| 2 | 6 | (Argentina) Boca Juniors | 2001 | 14 | 9 | 3 | 2 | 20 | 13 | +7 |
| 1 | 5 | (Uruguay) Peñarol | 1961 | 6 | 4 | 1 | 1 | 12 | 5 | +7 |
| 1 | 3 | (Brazil) Santos | 1963 | 4 | 3 | 1 | 0 | 10 | 4 | +6 |
| 1 | 3 | (Brazil) São Paulo | 1993 | 8 | 4 | 2 | 2 | 13 | 6 | +7 |
| 1 | 3 | (Brazil) Palmeiras | 2021 | 13 | 9 | 3 | 1 | 29 | 10 | +19 |

==== Unsuccessful title-holder campaigns ====
Of the 25 clubs to win the tournament, 19 have never defended it. Seven of those clubs have won the trophy more than once and had more than one attempt to do so. In 2000 title-holders started participating on group stage, four title-holders have failed to advance past this stage since.

| # | Club | Year | Defeated by | Stage reached |
|---|---|---|---|---|
| 4 | (Uruguay) Peñarol | 1962 | Santos | Runners-up |
| 4 | (Uruguay) Peñarol | 1967 | Nacional | Semi-finals |
| 4 | (Uruguay) Peñarol | 1983 | Grêmio | Runners-up |
| 4 | (Uruguay) Peñarol | 1988 | San Lorenzo | Third stage, before semi-finals |
| 4 | (Argentina) Boca Juniors | 1979 | Olimpia | Runners-up |
| 4 | (Argentina) Boca Juniors | 2002 | Olimpia | Quarter-finals |
| 4 | (Argentina) Boca Juniors | 2004 | Once Caldas | Runners-up |
| 4 | (Argentina) Boca Juniors | 2008 | Fluminense | Semi-finals |
| 4 | (Argentina) River Plate | 1987 | Peñarol | Semi-finals |
| 4 | (Argentina) River Plate | 1997 | Racing | Round of 16 |
| 4 | (Argentina) River Plate | 2016 | Independiente del Valle | Round of 16 |
| 4 | (Argentina) River Plate | 2019 | Flamengo | Runners-up |
| 3 | (Argentina) Independiente | 1966 | River Plate | Semi-finals |
| 3 | (Argentina) Independiente | 1976 | River Plate | Semi-finals |
| 3 | (Argentina) Independiente | 1985 | Argentinos Juniors | Semi-finals |
| 3 | (Uruguay) Nacional | 1972 | Universitario | Semi-finals |
| 3 | (Uruguay) Nacional | 1981 | Cobreloa | Semi-finals |
| 3 | (Uruguay) Nacional | 1989 | Danubio | Round of 16 |
| 3 | (Paraguay) Olimpia | 1980 | Nacional | Semi-finals |
| 3 | (Paraguay) Olimpia | 1991 | Colo-Colo | Runners-up |
| 3 | (Paraguay) Olimpia | 2003 | Grêmio | Round of 16 |
| 3 | (Brazil) Flamengo | 1982 | Peñarol | Semi-finals |
| 3 | (Brazil) Flamengo | 2020 | Racing | Round of 16 |
| 3 | (Brazil) Flamengo | 2023 | Olimpia | Round of 16 |
| 3 | (Brazil) Grêmio | 1984 | Independiente | Runners-up |
| 3 | (Brazil) Grêmio | 1996 | América de Cali | Semi-finals |
| 3 | (Brazil) Grêmio | 2018 | River Plate | Semi-finals |
| | (Brazil) Cruzeiro | 1977 | Boca Juniors | Runners-up |
| | (Brazil) Cruzeiro | 1998 | Vasco da Gama | Round of 16 |
| | (Brazil) São Paulo | 1994 | Vélez Sársfield | Runners-up |
| | (Brazil) São Paulo | 2006 | Internacional | Runners-up |
| | (Argentina) Estudiantes | 1971 | Nacional | Runners-up |
| | (Argentina) Estudiantes | 2010 | Internacional | Quarter-finals |
| | (Brazil) Internacional | 2007 | Nacional | Group stage |
| | (Brazil) Internacional | 2007 | Vélez Sársfield | Group stage |
| | (Brazil) Internacional | 2011 | Peñarol | Round of 16 |
| | (Brazil) Santos | 1964 | Independiente | Semi-finals |
| | (Brazil) Santos | 2012 | Corinthians | Semi-finals |
| | (Colombia) Atlético Nacional | 1990 | Olimpia | Semi-finals |
| | (Colombia) Atlético Nacional | 2017 | Barcelona | Group stage |
| | (Colombia) Atlético Nacional | 2017 | Botafogo | Group stage |
| | (Brazil) Palmeiras | 2000 | Boca Juniors | Runners-up |
| | (Brazil) Palmeiras | 2022 | Athletico Paranaense | Semi-finals |
| 1 | (Argentina) Racing | 1968 | Estudiantes | Semi-finals |
| 1 | (Argentina) Argentinos Juniors | 1986 | River Plate | Semi-finals |
| 1 | (Chile) Colo-Colo | 1992 | Barcelona | Round of 16 |
| 1 | (Argentina) Vélez Sársfield | 1995 | River Plate | Quarter-finals |
| 1 | (Brazil) Vasco da Gama | 1999 | Palmeiras | Round of 16 |
| 1 | (Colombia) Once Caldas | 2005 | UANL | Round of 16 |
| 1 | (Ecuador) LDU Quito | 2009 | Palmeiras | Group stage |
| 1 | (Ecuador) LDU Quito | 2009 | Sport | Group stage |
| 1 | (Brazil) Corinthians | 2013 | Boca Juniors | Round of 16 |
| 1 | (Brazil) Atlético Mineiro | 2014 | Atlético Nacional | Round of 16 |
| 1 | (Argentina) San Lorenzo | 2015 | Corinthians | Group stage |
| 1 | (Argentina) San Lorenzo | 2015 | São Paulo | Group stage |
| 1 | (Brazil) Fluminense | 2024 | Atlético Mineiro | Quarter-finals |
| 1 | (Brazil) Botafogo | 2025 | LDU Quito | Round of 16 |

==== Title-holder campaign by stage ====
As of 2025, these are the stages the title holders advanced to in the following competition:

| Stages | # | Years |
|---|---|---|
| Champions | 12 | 1961, 1963, 1965, 1969, 1970, 1973, 1974, 1975, 1978, 1993, 2001, 2021 |
| Runners-up | 12 | 1962, 1971, 1977, 1979, 1983, 1984, 1991, 1994, 2000, 2004, 2006, 2019 |
| Semi-finals | 18 | 1964, 1966, 1967, 1968, 1972, 1976, 1980, 1981, 1982, 1985, 1986, 1987, 1990, 1996, 2008, 2012, 2018, 2022 |
| Quarter-finals | 5 | 1988 (third stage, before semi-finals), 1995, 2002, 2010, 2024 |
| Round of 16 | 14 | 1989, 1992, 1997, 1998, 1999, 2003, 2005, 2011, 2013, 2014, 2016, 2020, 2023, 2025 |
| Group stage | 4 | 2007, 2009, 2015, 2017 |
| No previous champions | 1 | 1960 |

=== Defeating title-holders ===
- Years in bold: winner of the edition.

| # | Club | Year | Title-holder | Stage when defeated champions | Stage reached |
|---|---|---|---|---|---|
| 13 | Title-holder not defeated | 1960 | no previous champions | | |
| 13 | Title-holder not defeated | 1961 | Peñarol | | |
| 13 | Title-holder not defeated | 1963 | Santos | | |
| 13 | Title-holder not defeated | 1965 | Independiente | | |
| 13 | Title-holder not defeated | 1969 | Estudiantes | | |
| 13 | Title-holder not defeated | 1970 | Estudiantes | | |
| 13 | Title-holder not defeated | 1973 | Independiente | | |
| 13 | Title-holder not defeated | 1974 | Independiente | | |
| 13 | Title-holder not defeated | 1975 | Independiente | | |
| 13 | Title-holder not defeated | 1978 | Boca Juniors | | |
| 13 | Title-holder not defeated | 1993 | São Paulo | | |
| 13 | Title-holder not defeated | 2001 | Boca Juniors | | |
| 13 | Title-holder not defeated | 2021 | Palmeiras | | |
| 5 | (Argentina) River Plate | 1966 | Independiente | Semi-finals | Runners-up |
| 5 | (Argentina) River Plate | 1976 | Independiente | Semi-finals | Runners-up |
| 5 | (Argentina) River Plate | **1986** | Argentinos Juniors | Semi-finals | Champions |
| 5 | (Argentina) River Plate | 1995 | Vélez Sársfield | Quarter-finals | Semi-finals |
| 5 | (Argentina) River Plate | **2018** | Grêmio | Semi-finals | Champions |
| 4 | (Uruguay) Nacional | 1967 | Peñarol | Semi-finals | Runners-up |
| 4 | (Uruguay) Nacional | **1971** | Estudiantes | Final | Champions |
| 4 | (Uruguay) Nacional | **1980** | Olimpia | Semi-finals | Champions |
| 4 | (Uruguay) Nacional | 2007 | Internacional | Group stage | Quarter-finals |
| 4 | (Paraguay) Olimpia | **1979** | Boca Juniors | Final | Champions |
| 4 | (Paraguay) Olimpia | **1990** | Atlético Nacional | Semi-finals | Champions |
| 4 | (Paraguay) Olimpia | **2002** | Boca Juniors | Quarter-finals | Champions |
| 4 | (Paraguay) Olimpia | 2023 | Flamengo | Round of 16 | Quarter-finals |
| 3 | (Uruguay) Peñarol | **1982** | Flamengo | Semi-finals | Champions |
| 3 | (Uruguay) Peñarol | **1987** | River Plate | Semi-finals | Champions |
| 3 | (Uruguay) Peñarol | 2011 | Internacional | Round of 16 | Runners-up |
| 3 | (Argentina) Boca Juniors | **1977** | Cruzeiro | Final | Champions |
| 3 | (Argentina) Boca Juniors | **2000** | Palmeiras | Final | Champions |
| 3 | (Argentina) Boca Juniors | 2013 | Corinthians | Round of 16 | Quarter-finals |
| 2 | (Argentina) Independiente | **1964** | Santos | Semi-finals | Champions |
| 2 | (Argentina) Independiente | **1984** | Grêmio | Final | Champions |
| 2 | (Brazil) Grêmio | **1983** | Peñarol | Final | Champions |
| 2 | (Brazil) Grêmio | 2003 | Olimpia | Round of 16 | Quarter-finals |
| 2 | (Argentina) Vélez Sársfield | **1994** | São Paulo | Final | Champions |
| 2 | (Argentina) Vélez Sársfield | 2007 | Internacional | Group stage | Round of 16 |
| 2 | (Brazil) Palmeiras | **1999** | Vasco da Gama | Round of 16 | Champions |
| 2 | (Brazil) Palmeiras | 2009 | LDU Quito | Group stage | Quarter-finals |
| 2 | (Brazil) Internacional | **2006** | São Paulo | Final | Champions |
| 2 | (Brazil) Internacional | **2010** | Estudiantes | Quarter-finals | Champions |
| 2 | (Brazil) Corinthians | **2012** | Santos | Semi-finals | Champions |
| 2 | (Brazil) Corinthians | 2015 | San Lorenzo | Group stage | Round of 16 |
| 2 | (Ecuador) Barcelona | 1992 | Colo-Colo | Round of 16 | Semi-finals |
| 2 | (Ecuador) Barcelona | 2017 | Atlético Nacional | Group stage | Semi-finals |
| 2 | (Argentina) Racing | 1997 | River Plate | Round of 16 | Semi-finals |
| 2 | (Argentina) Racing | 2020 | Flamengo | Round of 16 | Quarter-finals |
| 1 | (Brazil) Santos | **1962** | Peñarol | Final | Champions |
| 1 | (Argentina) Estudiantes | **1968** | Racing | Semi-finals | Champions |
| 1 | (Peru) Universitario | 1972 | Nacional | Semi-finals | Runners-up |
| 1 | (Chile) Cobreloa | 1981 | Nacional | Semi-finals | Runners-up |
| 1 | (Argentina) Argentinos Juniors | **1985** | Independiente | Semi-finals | Champions |
| 1 | (Argentina) San Lorenzo | 1988 | Peñarol | Third stage, before semi-finals | Semi-finals |
| 1 | (Uruguay) Danubio | 1989 | Nacional | Round of 16 | Semi-finals |
| 1 | (Chile) Colo-Colo | **1991** | Olimpia | Final | Champions |
| 1 | (Colombia) América de Cali | 1996 | Grêmio | Semi-finals | Runners-up |
| 1 | (Brazil) Vasco da Gama | **1998** | Cruzeiro | Round of 16 | Champions |
| 1 | (Colombia) Once Caldas | **2004** | Boca Juniors | Final | Champions |
| 1 | (Mexico) UANL | 2005 | Once Caldas | Round of 16 | Quarter-finals |
| 1 | (Brazil) Fluminense | 2008 | Boca Juniors | Semi-finals | Runners-up |
| 1 | (Brazil) Sport | 2009 | LDU Quito | Group stage | Round of 16 |
| 1 | (Colombia) Atlético Nacional | 2014 | Atlético Mineiro | Round of 16 | Quarter-finals |
| 1 | (Brazil) São Paulo | 2015 | San Lorenzo | Group stage | Round of 16 |
| 1 | (Ecuador) Independiente del Valle | 2016 | River Plate | Round of 16 | Runners-up |
| 1 | (Brazil) Botafogo | 2017 | Atlético Nacional | Group stage | Quarter-finals |
| 1 | (Brazil) Flamengo | **2019** | River Plate | Final | Champions |
| 1 | (Brazil) Athletico Paranaense | 2022 | Palmeiras | Semi-finals | Runners-up |
| 1 | (Brazil) Atletico Mineiro | 2024 | Fluminense | Quarter-Final | Runners-up |
| 1 | (Ecuador) LDU Quito | 2025 | Botafogo | Round of 16 | Semi-finals |

=== Defeated champions in a single tournament ===
- Year in bold: winners of that edition.
- Club in italics: title-holder.

==== By number of champions defeated ====
| # | Club | Year | Defeated champions (number of titles, stage) | Stage reached |
|---|---|---|---|---|
| 5 | (Brazil) Botafogo | 2017 | Colo-Colo (1, second stage), Olimpia (3, third stage), Atlético Nacional (2, group stage), Estudiantes (4, group stage), Nacional (3, round of 16) | Quarter-finals |
| 5 | (Argentina) River Plate | **2018** | Flamengo (1, group stage), Racing (1, round of 16), Independiente (7, quarter-finals), Grêmio (3, semi-finals), Boca Juniors (6, finals) | Champions |
| 5 | (Brazil) Flamengo | **2019** | Peñarol (5, group stage), LDU Quito (1, group stage), Internacional (2, quarter-finals), Grêmio (3, semi-finals), River Plate (4, final) | Champions |
| 5 | (Brazil) Fluminense | **2023** | River Plate (4, group stage), Argentinos Juniors (1, round of 16), Olimpia (3, quarter-finals), Internacional (2, semi-finals), Boca Juniors (6, final) | Champions |
| 5 | (Brazil) Botafogo | **2024** | LDU Quito (1, group stage), Palmeiras (3, round of 16), São Paulo (3, quarter-finals), Peñarol (5, semi-finals), Atlético Mineiro (1, finals) | Champions |
| 5 | (Brazil) Flamengo | **2025** | LDU Quito (1, group stage), Internacional (2, round of 16), Estudiantes (4, quarter-finals), Racing (1, semi-finals), Palmeiras (3, finals) | Champions |
| 4 | (Argentina) Independiente | **1984** | Estudiantes (3, group stage), Olimpia (1, group stage), Nacional (2, semi-finals), Grêmio (1, finals) | Champions |
| 4 | (Colombia) Once Caldas | **2004** | Vélez Sársfield (1, group stage), Santos (2, quarter-finals), São Paulo (2, semi-finals), Boca Juniors (5, finals) | Champions |
| 4 | (Ecuador) Barcelona | 2017 | Atlético Nacional (2, group stage), Estudiantes (4, group stage), Palmeiras (1, round of 16), Santos (3, quarter-finals) | Semi-finals |
| 4 | (Brazil) Santos | 2020 | Olimpia (3, group stage), LDU Quito (1, round of 16), Grêmio (3, quarter-finals), Boca Juniors (6, semi-finals) | Runners-up |
| 4 | (Argentina) Boca Juniors | 2023 | Colo-Colo (1, group stage), Nacional (3, round of 16), Racing (1, quarter-finals), Palmeiras (3, semi-finals) | Runners-up |
| 3 | (Argentina) River Plate | 1976 | Estudiantes (3, group stage), Independiente (6, semi-finals), Peñarol (3, semi-finals) | Runners-up |
| 3 | (Brazil) Grêmio | **1983** | Flamengo (1, group stage), Estudiantes (3, semi-finals), Peñarol (4, finals) | Champions |
| 3 | (Argentina) River Plate | **1986** | Boca Juniors (2, group stage), Peñarol (4, group stage), Argentinos Juniors (1, semi-finals) | Champions |
| 3 | (Chile) Colo-Colo | **1991** | Nacional (3, quarter-finals), Boca Juniors (2, semi-finals), Olimpia (2, finals) | Champions |
| 3 | (Brazil) Vasco da Gama | **1998** | Cruzeiro (2, round of 16), Grêmio (2, quarter-finals), River Plate (2, semi-finals) | Champions |
| 3 | (Brazil) Palmeiras | **1999** | Olimpia (2, group stage), Vasco da Gama (1, round of 16), River Plate (2, semi-finals) | Champions |
| 3 | (Paraguay) Olimpia | **2002** | Flamengo (1, group stage), Boca Juniors (4, quarter-finals), Grêmio (2, semi-finals) | Champions |
| 3 | (Brazil) Fluminense | 2008 | Atlético Nacional (1, round of 16), São Paulo (3, quarter-finals), Boca Juniors (6, semi-finals) | Runners-up |
| 3 | (Uruguay) Peñarol | 2011 | Independiente (7, group stage), Internacional (2, round of 16), Vélez Sársfield (1, semi-finals) | Runners-up |
| 3 | (Brazil) Santos | **2011** | Colo-Colo (1, group stage), Once Caldas (1, quarter-finals), Peñarol (5, finals) | Champions |
| 3 | (Brazil) Corinthians | **2012** | Vasco da Gama (1, quarter-finals), Santos (3, semi-finals), Boca Juniors (6, finals) | Champions |
| 3 | (Ecuador) Independiente del Valle | 2016 | Colo-Colo (1, group stage), River Plate (3, round of 16), Boca Juniors (6, semi-finals) | Runners-up |
| 3 | (Brazil) Palmeiras | **2021** | São Paulo (3, quarter-finals), Atlético Mineiro (1, semi-finals), Flamengo (2, final) | Champions |
| 3 | (Brazil) Flamengo | 2021 | Vélez Sarsfield (1, group stage), LDU Quito (1, group stage), Olimpia (3, quarter-finals) | Runners-up |

==== By number of titles combined ====
| # | Club | Year | Defeated champions (number of titles, stage) | Stage reached |
|---|---|---|---|---|
| 18 | (Argentina) River Plate | **2018** | Flamengo (1, group stage), Racing (1, round of 16), Independiente (7, quarter-finals), Grêmio (3, semi-finals), Boca Juniors (6, finals) | Champions |
| 16 | (Brazil) Fluminense | **2023** | River Plate (4, group stage), Argentinos Juniors (1, round of 16), Olimpia (3, quarter-finals), Internacional (2, semi-finals), Boca Juniors (6, final) | Champions |
| 15 | (Brazil) Flamengo | **2019** | Peñarol (5, group stage), LDU Quito (1, group stage), Internacional (2, quarter-finals), Grêmio (3, semi-finals), River Plate (4, final) | Champions |
| 13 | (Brazil) Botafogo | 2017 | Colo-Colo (1, second stage), Olimpia (3, third stage), Atlético Nacional (2, group stage), Estudiantes (4, group stage), Nacional (3, round of 16) | Quarter-finals |
| 13 | (Brazil) Santos | 2020 | Olimpia (3, group stage), LDU Quito (1, round of 16), Grêmio (3, quarter-finals), Boca Juniors (6, semi-finals) | Runners-up |
| 13 | (Brazil) Botafogo | **2024** | LDU Quito (1, group stage), Palmeiras (3, round of 16), São Paulo (3, quarter-finals), Peñarol (5, semi-finals), Atlético Mineiro (1, finals) | Champions |
| 12 | (Argentina) River Plate | 1976 | Estudiantes (3, group stage), Independiente (6, semi-finals), Peñarol (3, semi-finals) | Runners-up |
| 12 | (Brazil) São Caetano | 2004 | Peñarol (5, group stage), Independiente (7, playoff between group stage and round of 16) | Quarter-finals |
| 11 | (Brazil) Flamengo | **2025** | LDU Quito (1, group stage), Internacional (2, round of 16), Estudiantes (4, quarter-finals), Racing (1, semi-finals), Palmeiras (3, finals) | Champions |
| 10 | (Colombia) Once Caldas | **2004** | Vélez Sársfield (1, group stage), Santos (2, quarter-finals), São Paulo (2, semi-finals), Boca Juniors (5, finals) | Champions |
| 10 | (Brazil) Fluminense | 2008 | Atlético Nacional (1, round of 16), São Paulo (3, quarter-finals), Boca Juniors (6, semi-finals) | Runners-up |
| 10 | (Uruguay) Peñarol | 2011 | Independiente (7, group stage), Internacional (2, round of 16), Vélez Sársfield (1, semi-finals) | Runners-up |
| 10 | (Brazil) Corinthians | **2012** | Vasco da Gama (1, quarter-finals), Santos (3, semi-finals), Boca Juniors (6, finals) | Champions |
| 10 | (Ecuador) Independiente del Valle | 2016 | Colo-Colo (1, group stage), River Plate (3, round of 16), Boca Juniors (6, semi-finals) | Runners-up |
| 10 | (Ecuador) Barcelona | 2017 | Atlético Nacional (2, group stage), Estudiantes (4, group stage), Palmeiras (1, round of 16), Santos (3, quarter-finals) | Semi-finals |
| 9 | (Argentina) Boca Juniors | 1979 | Peñarol (3, semi-finals), Independiente (6, semi-finals) | Runners-up |

=== Winning other trophies ===
Only 2 clubs have the distinction of winning the Copa Libertadores, their national league, and another domestic tournament in the same year/season, known colloquially as the treble: (Note: Note: trebles are not possible for all South American clubs since many countries do not have a domestic cup.)

- Santos in 1962, having won the 1962 Copa Libertadores, the Taça Brasil and the Campeonato Paulista. Santos also went on to win the Intercontinental Cup that same year.
- Flamengo twice, in 2019 and 2025, having won the Copa Libertadores, the Campeonato Brasileiro Série A and the Campeonato Carioca.

In addition to Santos and Flamengo, seven other clubs have achieved a continental double, in which a club won the Copa Libertadores in addition to their domestic league in the same year:

- Peñarol in 1960 and 1961
- Santos in 1963
- Nacional in 1971 and 1980
- Olimpia in 1979
- Argentinos Juniors in 1985
- River Plate in 1986
- Colo-Colo in 1991
- Botafogo in 2024

In addition to the double, the following clubs have gone on to win other trophies in that same time frame:

- Peñarol won the Intercontinental Cup in 1961
- Santos won the Intercontinental Cup in 1963
- Nacional won the Intercontinental Cup and Copa Interamericana in 1971, and the Intercontinental Cup in 1980
- Olimpia won the Intercontinental Cup and Copa Interamericana in 1979
- Argentinos Juniors won the Copa Interamericana in 1985
- River Plate won the Intercontinental Cup and Copa Interamericana in 1986
- Colo-Colo won the Copa Interamericana in 1991

=== Biggest wins ===
- The largest margin of victory in a single match is nine goals, which occurred twice:
  - Peñarol defeated Valencia 11–2 in 1970
  - River Plate defeated Universitario de La Paz 9–0 in 1970
- The largest margin of victory in a single finals match is four goals, done twice by São Paulo:
  - São Paulo defeated Universidad Católica 5–1 in the first leg in 1993
  - São Paulo defeated Atlético Paranaense 4–0 in the second leg in 2005

=== Biggest two-leg win ===
- The largest margin of victory over two legs is fourteen goals, which occurred when River Plate defeated Binacional 14–0 on aggregate in 2020; the scorelines in each match were 8–0 and 6–0.

=== Most goals in a match ===
- The record number of goals scored in a single match is thirteen, which occurred when Peñarol defeated Valencia 11–2 in 1970.
- The most goals scored in a draw is ten, which occurred when Bolívar drew 5–5 with Atlético Paranaense in 2002.
- The most goals scored in a single finals match is six. This occurred on three occasions:
  - Peñarol defeated River Plate 4–2 in the third leg in 1966
  - São Paulo defeated Universidad Católica 5–1 in the second leg in 1993
  - LDU Quito defeated Fluminense 4–2 in the first leg in 2008

=== Most goals over two legs or more ===
- The most goals scored over two legs is fifteen, which occurred when Peñarol defeated Everest 14–1 on aggregate in 1963; the scorelines in each match were 5–0 and 9–1.
  - In instances where a third leg was needed, the record number of goals scored is seventeen, which occurred when Peñarol defeated Santos 9–8 on aggregate in 1965; the scorelines in each match were 5–4, 3–2, and 2–1.
- The most goals scored over two legs in the finals is ten, which occurred when LDU Quito drew Fluminense 5–5 on aggregate in 2008; the scorelines in each match were 4–2 and 3–1.
  - In instances where a third leg was needed, the record number of goals scored in the finals is thirteen, which occurred twice:
    - Peñarol defeated River Plate 8–5 on aggregate in 1966; the scorelines in each match were 2–0, 3–2, and 4–2.
    - Cruzeiro also defeated River Plate 8–5 overall in 1976; the scorelines in each match were 4–1, 2–1, and 3–2.

== Players ==
=== Appearances ===
Ever Almeida holds the record for most matches played with 113 games, all for Olimpia. He is also the only person to have made over 100 appearances in the tournament.

| Rank | Country | Player | Appearances | Goals | From | To | Club(s) |
|---|---|---|---|---|---|---|---|
| 1 | (Paraguay) | Ever Almeida | 113 | 0 | 1973 | 1990 | Olimpia |
| 2 | (Colombia) | Antony de Ávila | 94 | 29 | 1983 | 1998 | América de Cali, Barcelona |
| 3 | (Bolivia) | Vladimir Soria | 93 | 4 | 1986 | 2000 | Bolívar |
| 4 | (Colombia) | Willington Ortiz | 92 | 19 | 1973 | 1988 | Millonarios, América de Cali, Deportivo Cali |
| 5 | (Brazil) | Rogério Ceni | 90 | 14 | 2004 | 2015 | São Paulo |
| 6 | (Uruguay) | Pedro Rocha | 88 | 36 | 1962 | 1979 | Peñarol, São Paulo, Palmeiras |
| 7 | (Ecuador) | Alberto Spencer | 87 | 54 | 1960 | 1972 | Peñarol, Barcelona |
| 7 | (Bolivia) | Carlos Borja | 87 | 11 | 1979 | 1997 | Bolívar |
| 8 | (Paraguay) | Juan Battaglia | 85 | 22 | 1978 | 1990 | Cerro Porteño, América de Cali |
| 9 | (Colombia) | Álex Escobar | 83 | 14 | 1985 | 2000 | América de Cali, LDU Quito |
| 10 | (Argentina) | Clemente Rodríguez | 82 | 2 | 2001 | 2013 | Boca Juniors, Estudiantes |

=== Goalscoring ===
==== All-time top scorers ====
Alberto Spencer is the all-time goalscorer of the Copa Libertadores with 54 goals to his name between 1960 and 1972.

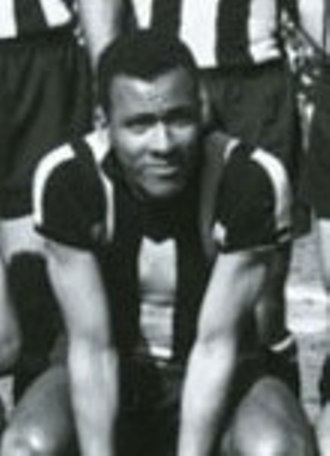
Alberto Spencer.

As of 28 November 2025
Players in bold played in 2025 Copa Libertadores.

| Rank | Nation | Player | Goals | Apps | Goal Ratio | Debut | Club(s) (goals) |
|---|---|---|---|---|---|---|---|
| 1 | (Ecuador) | Alberto Spencer | 54 | 87 | 0.62 | 1960 | Peñarol (48); Barcelona (6) |
| 2 | (Uruguay) | Fernando Morena | 37 | 77 | 0.48 | 1973 | Peñarol (37) |
| 3 | (Uruguay) | Pedro Virgilio Rocha | 36 | 89 | 0.40 | 1962 | Peñarol (25); São Paulo (10); Palmeiras (1) |
| 4 | (Argentina) | Daniel Onega | 31 | 47 | 0.66 | 1966 | River Plate (31) |
| 4 | (Brazil) | Gabriel Barbosa | 31 | 60 | 0.52 | 2018 | Santos (1); Flamengo (30) |
| 4 | (Colombia) | **Miguel Borja** | 31 | 69 | 0.45 | 2015 | Atlético Nacional (5); Palmeiras (11); Atlético Junior (7); River Plate (8) |
| 7 | (Uruguay) | Julio Morales | 30 | 76 | 0.39 | 1966 | Nacional (30) |
| 7 | (Argentina) | **Lucas Pratto** | 30 | 96 | 0.31 | 2011 | Universidad Católica (6); Vélez Sarsfield (8); Atlético Mineiro (7); River Plate (9) |
| 9 | (Brazil) | Luizão | 29 | 43 | 0.67 | 1998 | Vasco da Gama (5); Corinthians (15); Grêmio (4); São Paulo (5) |
| 9 | (Argentina) | Juan Carlos Sarnari | 29 | 62 | 0.47 | 1966 | River Plate (10); Universidad Católica (12); Universidad de Chile (4); Santa Fe (3) |
| 9 | (Colombia) | Antony de Ávila | 29 | 94 | 0.31 | 1983 | América de Cali (27); Barcelona (2) |

==== Top scorer award ====
The top scorer award is for the player who amasses the most goals in the tournament.

- Fernando Morena has received the most awards with three, in 1974, 1975 and 1982, all with Peñarol.
- Five other players have won the award multiple times:
  - Alberto Spencer with Peñarol in 1960 and 1962
  - Oswaldo Ramírez with Universitario in 1972 and 1975
  - Néstor Scotta (Deportivo Cali) in 1977 and 1978
  - Salvador Cabañas with América in 2007 and 2008
  - Gabriel Barbosa with Flamengo in 2019 and 2021
- Daniel Onega scored the most goals in a single tournament, with 17 for River Plate in 1966.
- Players from Peñarol have received the award the most times, with seven:
  - Alberto Spencer in 1960 and 1962
  - Raul Castronovo in 1971
  - Fernando Morena in 1974, 1975 and 1982
  - Carlos Aguilera in 1989
- Brazil is the nationality that has received the most awards, with 30 Brazilian players finishing as top scorer.

==== Hat-tricks ====
- The tournament's first hat-trick was scored by Alberto Spencer of Peñarol, when he netted four goals against Jorge Wilstermann on 19 April 1960, in the first ever match in the history of the tournament.
- Thiago Neves is the only player to score a hat-trick in a finals match, doing so for Fluminense against LDU Quito in 2008.

| Player | For | Against | Score | Date |
|---|---|---|---|---|
| (Ecuador) Alberto Spencer^{4} | Peñarol | Wilstermann | 7–1 | 19 April 1960 |
| (Brazil) Coutinho | Santos | Cerro Porteño | 9–1 | 28 February 1962 |
| (Ecuador) Enrique Raymondi^{5} | Emelec | U Católica | 7–2 | 21 February 1962 |
| (Uruguay) Francisco Sasía | Peñarol | Everest | 0–5 | 9 June 1963 |
| (Ecuador) Alberto Spencer^{5} | Peñarol | Everest | 9–1 | 7 July 1963 |
| (Argentina) José Sanfilippo | Boca Juniors | U de Chile | 2–3 | 31 July 1963 |
| (Brazil) Pelé | Santos | Botafogo | 0–4 | 28 August 1963 |
| (Colombia) Delio Gamboa | Millonarios | Alianza Lima | 3–2 | 7 May 1964 |
| (Brazil) Pelé | Santos | U de Chile | 1–5 | 13 February 1965 |
| (Argentina) Luis Onega | River Plate | Universitario | 5–0 | 1 March 1966 |
| (Bolivia) Moyano | D Municipal La Paz | 9 de Octubre | 3–4 | 19 February 1966 |
| (Ecuador) Hugo Lencina | Emelec | 9 de Octubre | 0–4 | 23 March 1966 |
| (Uruguay) Pedro Rocha | Nacional | U Católica | 3–2 | 10 April 1966 |
| (Argentina) Luis Artime | Independiente | Millonarios | 3–1 | 18 February 1968 |
| (Peru) Percy Rojas | Universitario | Wilstermann | 5–1 | 22 February 1968 |
| (Argentina) José Omar Pastoriza | Independiente | Universitario | 0–3 | 21 March 1968 |
| (Argentina) Oscar Más^{4} | River Plate | Universitario (BOL) | 9–0 | 11 March 1970 |
| (Argentina) Daniel Onega | River Plate | Universitario (BOL) | 9–0 | 11 March 1970 |
| (Uruguay) Pedro Rocha | Peñarol | Carabobo | 11–2 | 15 March 1970 |
| (Chile) Pedro Araya | U de Chile | Nacional | 3–0 | 15 April 1970 |
| (Brazil) Zico | Flamengo | Cerro Porteño | 2–4 | 11 August 1981 |
| (Paraguay) Salvador Cabañas | América (MEX) | Sporting Cristal | 5–0 | 24 January 2007 |
| (Chile) Alexis Sánchez | Colo Colo | Caracas | 0–4 | 20 March 2007 |
| (Colombia) Mauricio Molina^{4} | Santos | San José | 7–0 | 1 April 2008 |
| (Argentina) Matías Urbano | Cúcuta | San José | 2–4 | 8 April 2008 |
| (Uruguay) Sebastian Abreu | River Plate | U San Martín | 5–0 | 17 April 2008 |
| (Argentina) Martín Palermo | Boca Juniors | Atlas | 0–3 | 21 May 2008 |
| (Brazil) Thiago Neves | Fluminense | LDU | 3–1 | 2 July 2008 |
| (Colombia) Jackson Martínez | DIM | Peñarol | 4–0 | 28 January 2009 |
| (Argentina) Mauro Boselli | Estudiantes LP | D Quito | 4–0 | 19 March 2009 |
| (Argentina) Mauro Boselli | Estudiantes LP | Aurich | 5–1 | 11 February 2010 |
| (Peru) Wilmer Aguirre | Alianza Lima | Estudiantes LP | 4–1 | 18 February 2010 |
| (Brazil) Thiago Ribeiro | Cruzeiro | Nacional | 3–1 | 29 April 2010 |
| (Uruguay) Rodrigo López | Estudiantes LP | Guarani (PAR) | 5–1 | 17 March 2011 |
| (Chile) Junior Fernandes | U de Chile | Godoy Cruz | 5–1 | 22 February 2012 |
| (Brazil) Neymar | Santos | Internacional | 3–1 | 7 March 2012 |
| (Argentina) Leandro Caruso | Godoy Cruz | A Nacional | 4–4 | 8 March 2012 |
| (Brazil) Leandro Damiao | Internacional | The Strongest | 5–0 | 13 March 2012 |
| (Argentina) Matías Alustiza^{4} | D Quito | Guadalajara | 5–0 | 17 April 2012 |
| (Brazil) Bernard | A Mineiro | Arsenal S | 2–5 | 26 February 2013 |
| (Paraguay) Rogerio Leichtweis | D Tolima | Real Garcilaso | 0–3 | 2 April 2013 |
| (Uruguay) Braian Rodríguez | Huachipato | Caracas | 0–4 | 3 April 2013 |
| (Brazil) Jô | A Mineiro | São Paulo | 4–1 | 8 May 2013 |
| (Brazil) Wallyson | Botafogo | D Quito | 4–0 | 5 February 2014 |
| (Brazil) Ricardo Goulart | Cruzeiro | U de Chile | 5–1 | 25 February 2014 |
| (Ecuador) Daniel Angulo^{4} | Independiente del Valle | Unión Española | 4–5 | 4 April 2014 |
| (Argentina) Gustavo Bou | Racing Club | D Táchira | 0–5 | 17 February 2015 |
| (Argentina) Gustavo Bou | Racing Club | Guarani (PAR) | 4–1 | 24 February 2015 |
| (Argentina) Guido Carrillo | Estudiantes LP | Barcelona SC | 3–0 | 25 February 2015 |
| (Colombia) Wilson Morelo | Independiente SF | Colo Colo | 3–1 | 26 February 2015 |
| (Mexico) Enrique Esqueda | UANL | Aurich | 4–5 | 15 April 2015 |
| (Bolivia) Juan Carlos Arce | Bolivar | D Cali | 5–0 | 3 March 2016 |
| (Argentina) Marco Ruben | Rosario C | River Plate (URU) | 4–1 | 9 March 2016 |
| (Argentina) Jonathan Calleri^{4} | São Paulo | Trujillanos | 6–0 | 5 April 2016 |
| (Bolivia) Pablo Escobar | The Strongest | Unión Española | 5–0 | 23 February 2017 |
| (Brazil) Fred^{4} | A Mineiro | Sport Boys (BOL) | 5–2 | 13 April 2017 |
| (Argentina) Lucas Barrios | Gremio | Guarani (PAR) | 4–1 | 27 April 2017 |
| (Argentina) Ignacio Scocco^{5} | River Plate | Wilstermann | 8–0 | 21 September 2017 |
| (Argentina) Lautaro Martínez | Racing Club | Cruzeiro | 4–2 | 27 February 2018 |
| (Colombia) Ayron del Valle | Millonarios | D Lara | 4–0 | 17 April 2018 |
| (Brazil) Jádson | Corinthians | D Lara | 2–7 | 7 May 2018 |
| (Colombia) Miguel Borja | Palmeiras | Atlético Junior | 3–1 | 16 May 2018 |
| (Argentina) Adrián Martínez | Libertad | The Strongest | 5–1 | 13 February 2019 |
| (Chile) Patricio Rubio^{4} | U Concepcion | Sporting Cristal | 5–4 | 6 March 2019 |
| (Argentina) Marco Ruben | A Paranaense | Boca Juniors | 3–0 | 2 April 2019 |
| (Brazil) Fred | Cruzeiro | Huracán | 4–0 | 10 April 2019 |
| (Ecuador) Anderson Julio | LDU | San José | 4–0 | 8 May 2019 |
| (Brazil) Luiz Adriano | Palmeiras | Guaraní (PAR) | 3–1 | 10 March 2020 |
| (Colombia) Carmelo Valencia | Atlético Junior | Independiente del Valle | 4–1 | 22 September 2020 |
| (Colombia) Rafael Santos Borré | River Plate | Nacional | 2–6 | 17 December 2020 |
| (Brazil) Diego Souza | Gremio | Ayacucho | 6–1 | 10 March 2021 |
| (Paraguay) Brian Montenegro | Independiente del Valle | Unión Española | 6–2 | 16 March 2021 |
| (Argentina) Gonzalo Bergessio | Nacional | A Nacional | 4–4 | 28 Apríl 2021 |
| (Brazil) Rafael Navarro^{4} | Palmeiras | Independiente Petrolero | 8–1 | 12 April 2022 |
| (Uruguay) Sebastián Rodríguez | Emelec | Táchira | 1–4 | 3 May 2022 |
| (Brazil) Raphael Veiga | Palmeiras | Independiente Petrolero | 0–5 | 3 May 2022 |
| (Brazil) Gustavo Scarpa | Palmeiras | Táchira | 4–0 | 24 May 2022 |
| (Argentina) Julián Álvarez^{6} | River Plate | Alianza Lima | 8–1 | 25 May 2022 |
| (Brazil) Pedro^{4} | Flamengo | Tolima | 7–1 | 6 July 2022 |
| (Brazil) Pedro | Flamengo | Vélez Sarsfield | 0–4 | 31 August 2022 |
| (Colombia) Dorlan Pabón | Atlético Nacional | Melgar | 3–1 | 20 April 2023 |
| (Argentina) Germán Cano | Fluminense | River Plate | 5–1 | 2 May 2023 |
| (Uruguay) Martín Cauteruccio | Sporting Cristal | Always Ready | 3–1 | 27 February 2024 |
| (Brazil) Júnior Santos^{4} | Botafogo | Aurora | 6–0 | 28 February 2024 |
| (Uruguay) Maximiliano Silvera | Peñarol | Caracas | 5–0 | 10 April 2024 |
| (Argentina) Jonathan Torres | Cerro Porteño | Bolívar | 4–2 | 1 April 2025 |
| (Brazil) Alan Patrick | Internacional | Atlético Nacional | 3–0 | 10 April 2025 |
| (Paraguay) Carlos González | Indepediente del Valle | Libertad | 2–3 | 28 April 2026 |
| (Paraguay) Álex Arce | Independiente Rivadavia | La Guaira | 4–1 | 30 April 2026 |
| (Paraguay) Álex Arce | Independiente Rivadavia | La Guaira | 2–4 | 21 May 2026 |

==== Other goalscoring records ====
- The fastest goal ever scored in the tournament was by Alianza Lima's Félix Suárez, who scored in 6 seconds against Santa Fe on 4 April 1976.
- The most goals scored by a single player in a match is six by Juan Carlos Sánchez, in Club Blooming's 8–0 victory over Deportivo Italia on 7 April 1985, and Julián Álvarez, in River Plate's 8–1 victory over Alianza Lima on 25 May 2022.
- The youngest player to ever score in the tournament was Endrick, aged 16 years and 322 days when he scored for Palmeiras against Barcelona on 7 June 2023.
- The oldest player to ever score in the tournament was Zé Roberto, aged 42 years and 322 days when he scored for Palmeiras against Atlético Tucumán on 24 May 2017.

=== Other records ===
- Alejandro Bernal saw the fastest ever red card in a Libertadores match, being sent off after 22 seconds for Atlético Nacional against Nacional on 11 March 2014.

==== Most finals victories ====
- Francisco Sá is the only player to win the tournament six times; he won four titles with Independiente (1972, 1973, 1974 and 1975) and two with Boca Juniors (1977 and 1978).

==== Most finals defeats ====
- Antony de Ávila holds the unenviable record of appearing in five finals and losing in all five; four during his time at América de Cali (1985, 1986, 1987 and 1996) and one with Barcelona (1998).

== Awards ==
From 1999 to 2007, Toyota, the main sponsor of the tournament, awarded the best player of the finals. However, in 2008, the company decided to recognise the manager, understanding that they are the main ones responsible for leading the entire team towards victory, combining concepts of reading the game, training, setting goals and strategy, until the final whistle. The last Toyota award was given to Renato Portaluppi in the 2017 edition.

Besides the Toyota Awards, from 2008 to 2012, Banco Santander was the main sponsor of the tournament and elected the best player of the competition; the players awarded were Joffre Guerrón in 2008, Juan Sebastián Verón in 2009, Giuliano in 2010, Neymar in 2011 and Emerson in 2012.

=== Players ===
Toyota Award

| Year | Player | Club |
|---|---|---|
| 1999 | (Brazil) Marcos | (Brazil) Palmeiras |
| 2000 | (Colombia) Óscar Córdoba | (Argentina) Boca Juniors |
| 2001 | (Argentina) Juan Román Riquelme | (Argentina) Boca Juniors |
| 2002 | (Uruguay) Sergio Órteman | (Paraguay) Olimpia |
| 2003 | (Argentina) Carlos Tevez | (Argentina) Boca Juniors |
| 2004 | (Colombia) Jhon Viáfara | (Colombia) Once Caldas |
| 2005 | (Brazil) Amoroso | (Brazil) São Paulo |
| 2006 | (Brazil) Fernandão | (Brazil) Internacional |
| 2007 | (Argentina) Juan Román Riquelme | (Argentina) Boca Juniors |

Santander Award

| Year | Player | Club |
|---|---|---|
| 2008 | (Ecuador) Joffre Guerrón | (Ecuador) LDU Quito |
| 2009 | (Argentina) Juan Sebastián Verón | (Argentina) Estudiantes |
| 2010 | (Brazil) Giuliano | (Brazil) Internacional |
| 2011 | (Brazil) Neymar | (Brazil) Santos |
| 2012 | (Qatar) Emerson | (Brazil) Corinthians |

Bridgestone Award

| Year | Player | Club |
|---|---|---|
| 2013 | (Brazil) Victor | (Brazil) Atlético Mineiro |
| 2014 | (Paraguay) Néstor Ortigoza | (Argentina) San Lorenzo |
| 2015 | (Ecuador) Joffre Guerrón | (Mexico) Tigres UANL |
| 2016 | (Venezuela) Alejandro Guerra | (Colombia) Atlético Nacional |
| 2017 | (Brazil) Luan | (Brazil) Grêmio |
| 2018 | (Argentina) Gonzalo Martínez | (Argentina) River Plate |

Bridgestone Ring Award

| Year | Player | Club |
|---|---|---|
| 2019 | (Brazil) Bruno Henrique | (Brazil) Flamengo |
| 2020 | (Brazil) Marinho | (Brazil) Santos |
| 2021 | (Brazil) Gabriel Barbosa | (Brazil) Flamengo |
| 2022 | (Brazil) Pedro | (Brazil) Flamengo |

Hero Of The Tournament

| Year | Player | Club |
|---|---|---|
| 2024 | (Brazil) Luiz Henrique | (Brazil) Botafogo |
| 2025 | (Uruguay) Giorgian de Arrascaeta | (Brazil) Flamengo |

=== Managers ===
| Year | Manager | Club |
|---|---|---|
| 2008 | (Argentina) Edgardo Bauza | (Ecuador) LDU Quito |
| 2009 | (Argentina) Alejandro Sabella | (Argentina) Estudiantes |
| 2010 | (Brazil) Celso Roth | (Brazil) Internacional |
| 2011 | (Brazil) Muricy Ramalho | (Brazil) Santos |
| 2012 | (Brazil) Tite | (Brazil) Corinthians |
| 2013 | (Brazil) Cuca | (Brazil) Atlético Mineiro |
| 2014 | (Argentina) Edgardo Bauza | (Argentina) San Lorenzo |
| 2015 | (Argentina) Marcelo Gallardo | (Argentina) River Plate |
| 2016 | (Colombia) Reinaldo Rueda | (Colombia) Atlético Nacional |
| 2017 | (Brazil) Renato Portaluppi | (Brazil) Grêmio |
| 2018 | (Argentina) Marcelo Gallardo | (Argentina) River Plate |
| 2019 | (Portugal) Jorge Jesus | (Brazil) Flamengo |
| 2020 | (Portugal) Abel Ferreira | (Brazil) Palmeiras |
| 2021 | (Portugal) Abel Ferreira | (Brazil) Palmeiras |
| 2022 | (Brazil) Dorival Júnior | (Brazil) Flamengo |
| 2023 | (Brazil) Fernando Diniz | (Brazil) Fluminense |
| 2024 | (Portugal) Artur Jorge | (Brazil) Botafogo |
| 2025 | (Brazil) Filipe Luís | (Brazil) Flamengo |

== Coaches ==
=== Records ===
- Carlos Bianchi is the only coach to win the Copa Libertadores four times: once with Vélez Sársfield in 1994, and thrice with Boca Juniors in 2000, 2001 and 2003
- Carlos Bianchi is the only coach to manage five finalists: Vélez Sársfield in 1994 and Boca Juniors in 2000, 2001, 2003 and 2004
- Four coaches have won the tournament with two clubs:
  - Carlos Bianchi with Vélez Sársfield in 1994 and Boca Juniors in 2000, 2001 and 2003
  - Luiz Felipe Scolari with Grêmio in 1995 and Palmeiras in 1999
  - Paulo Autuori with Cruzeiro in 1997 and São Paulo in 2005
  - Edgardo Bauza with LDU Quito in 2008 and San Lorenzo in 2014
- Nine individuals have won the Copa Libertadores as a player, then later as a coach:
  - Humberto Maschio won as a player in 1967 with Racing and then as a manager in 1973 with Independiente
  - Roberto Ferreiro won as a player in 1964 and 1965 and then as a coach 1974, both with Independiente
  - Juan Martín Mujica won as a player in 1971 and then as a manager in 1980, both with Nacional.
  - Luis Cubilla won as a player in 1960 and 1961 with Peñarol and 1971 with Nacional and then as a coach with Olimpia in 1979 and 1990.
  - José Omar Pastoriza won as a player in 1972 and then as a manager 1984, both with Independiente.
  - Nery Pumpido won as a player in 1986 with River Plate and then as a coach in 2002 with Olimpia.
  - Marcelo Gallardo won as a player in 1996 and then as a manager in 2015 and 2018, both times with River Plate.
  - Renato Portaluppi won as a player in 1983 and then as a manager in 2017, both times with Grêmio.
  - Filipe Luis won as a player in 2019 and 2022 and then as a manager in 2025, all with Flamengo.
- Four non-South American managers have won the Copa Libertadores:
  - Mirko Jozić (a Yugoslav at the time) with Colo-Colo in 1991.
  - Jorge Jesus (Portuguese) with Flamengo in 2019.
  - Abel Ferreira (Portuguese) with Palmeiras in 2020 and 2021.
  - Artur Jorge (Portuguese) with Botafogo in 2024.

== Locals ==
=== Countries ===
- Argentina has provided 25 titles won by seven different clubs.
- Brazil shares this 25-title record, but holds the highest number of different winning clubs, twelve. They have also provided the highest number of different finalists, fourteen, and the highest number of different participating clubs, twenty-eight.
- On eight occasions two clubs from the same country played each other in the finals, seven of them involving Brazilian clubs and one of them involving Argentinian clubs:
  - (Brazil) São Paulo vs. Atlético Paranaense in 2005
  - (Brazil) Internacional vs. São Paulo in 2006
  - (Argentina) River Plate vs. Boca Juniors in 2018
  - (Brazil) Palmeiras vs. Santos in 2020
  - (Brazil) Palmeiras vs. Flamengo in 2021 and 2025
  - (Brazil) Flamengo vs. Athletico in 2022
  - (Brazil) Atlético Mineiro vs. Botafogo in 2024
- Teams from Bolivia, Peru, Venezuela and Mexico have never won the tournament. Teams from Bolivia and Venezuela have yet to provide a finalist.

=== Cities ===
- The most successful city in the history of the Copa Libertadores is Buenos Aires, which has seen a record five clubs win thirteen total titles.
- Fifteen cities have hosted a trophy ceremony. São Paulo has hosted the highest number of trophy ceremonies, with ten ceremonies held in three different stadiums.

=== Stadiums ===
- As of the end of 2005, 121 stadiums have been used to host Copa Libertadores matches. Estadio Centenario in Montevideo, Uruguay has held the most with 352 matches.
- Estadio Nacional in Santiago, Chile has hosted a record eight trophy ceremonies.
- Three stadiums have hosted matches with attendances in excess of 100,000:
  - 115,000 spectators saw Cruz Azul defeat River Plate 3–0 in a quarter-final match at the Estadio Azteca in 2001.
  - 106,853 spectators saw Cruzeiro defeat Sporting Cristal 1–0 in a finals match at the Estadio Mineirão in 1997.
  - 105,000 spectators saw São Paulo defeat Newell's Old Boys 1–0 in a semi-final match at the Estádio do Morumbi in 1992.
- A record twenty-five stadiums in Brazil have been used to host matches.
- In 1991, América de Cali and Atlético Nacional played five home matches at the Miami Orange Bowl in Miami, Florida, United States, after their home stadiums were banned. This was the only time a stadium outside of South America or Mexico was ever used until 2018.
- In 2018, River Plate became champions after defeating Boca Juniors at the Santiago Bernabéu Stadium in Madrid, for the second leg of the finals. This happened because of problems arranging a reschedule for the match, after crowd incidents before match that was supposed to be played at River Plate's stadium, the Estadio Monumental. This marked the only time a Copa Libertadores champion lifted the trophy outside of the Americas, and the first time in Europe.
- In 2019, Flamengo defeated River Plate and became the first champion in a single match final; the Estadio Monumental in Lima held the match, after the final was moved from Santiago.

== See also ==
- List of Copa Libertadores winning managers
- List of Copa Libertadores winning players
- List of Supercopa Libertadores finals
- List of Copa Sudamericana finals
- List of Copa Libertadores finals
