= 1978 Copa Libertadores =

19th season of Copa Libertadores

1978 Copa Libertadores de América
Tournament details
- Dates: June 27 – November 28
- Teams: 21 (from 10 associations)

Final positions
- Champions: (Argentina) Boca Juniors (2nd title)
- Runners-up: (Colombia) Deportivo Cali

Tournament statistics
- Matches played: 75
- Goals scored: 179 (2.39 per match)

The 1978 edition of Copa Libertadores was won by Boca Juniors, of Argentina for the second straight year, after defeating Deportivo Cali of Colombia in the final. The defending champions won the two-leg final 0–4 on aggregate, with all four goals coming in the second-leg match after the first leg ended in a goalless draw.

== Qualified teams ==
Country	Team	Qualification method
CONMEBOL (1 berth)	Boca Juniors	1977 Copa Libertadores champion
Argentina (2 berths)	River Plate	1977 Metropolitano champion
Argentina (2 berths)	Independiente	1977 Nacional champion
Bolivia (2 berths)	The Strongest	1977 Primera División champion
Bolivia (2 berths)	Oriente Petrolero	1977 Primera División runner-up
Brazil (2 berths)	São Paulo	1977 Campeonato Brasileiro Série A champion
Brazil (2 berths)	Atlético Mineiro	1977 Campeonato Brasileiro Série A runner-up
Chile (2 berths)	Unión Española	1977 Primera División champion
Chile (2 berths)	Palestino	1977 Liguilla Pre-Libertadores winner
Colombia (2 berths)	Junior	1977 Campeonato Profesional champion
Colombia (2 berths)	Deportivo Cali	1977 Campeonato Profesional runner-up
Ecuador (2 berths)	El Nacional	1977 Campeonato Ecuatoriano champion
Ecuador (2 berths)	LDU Quito	1977 Campeonato Ecuatoriano runner-up
Paraguay (2 berths)	Cerro Porteño	1977 Primera División champion
Paraguay (2 berths)	Libertad	1977 Primera División runner-up
Peru (2 berths)	Alianza Lima	1977 Primera División champion
Peru (2 berths)	Sporting Cristal	1977 Primera División runner-up
Uruguay (2 berths)	Peñarol	1977 Liguilla Pre-Libertadores winner
Uruguay (2 berths)	Danubio	1977 Liguilla Pre-Libertadores runner-up
Venezuela (2 berths)	Portuguesa	1977 Primera División champion
Venezuela (2 berths)	Estudiantes de Mérida	1977 Primera División runner-up

== Draw ==
The champions and runners-up of each football association were drawn into the same group along with another football association's participating teams. Three clubs from Argentina competed as Boca Juniors was champion of the 1977 Copa Libertadores. They entered the tournament in the Semifinals.

Group 1	Group 2	Group 3	Group 4	Group 5
Argentina; Ecuador	Bolivia; Peru	Brazil; Chile	Colombia; Uruguay	Paraguay; Venezuela

== Group stage ==
=== Group 1 ===
Group 1 standings
Pos	Team	Pld	W	D	L	GF	GA	GD	Pts	Qualification	(Argentina) RIV	(Argentina) IND	(Ecuador) LDQ	(Ecuador) EN
1	(Argentina) River Plate	6	2	4	0	7	1	+6	8	Qualified to the semi-finals	—	0–0	4–0	2–0
2	(Argentina) Independiente	6	3	2	1	6	2	+4	8		0–0	—	2–0	2–0
3	(Ecuador) LDU Quito	6	2	1	3	4	10	−6	5		0–0	1–0	—	3–2
4	(Ecuador) El Nacional	6	1	1	4	6	10	−4	3		1–1	1–2	2–0	—

==== Tiebreaker ====
2 August 1978	River Plate (Argentina)	4–1	(Argentina) Independiente	Buenos Aires

=== Group 2 ===
Group 2 standings
Pos	Team	Pld	W	D	L	GF	GA	GD	Pts	Qualification	(Peru) ALI	(Peru) CRI	(Bolivia) STR	(Bolivia) OPE
1	(Peru) Alianza Lima	6	5	1	0	19	5	+14	11	Qualified to the semi-finals	—	2–2	2–0	5–1
2	(Peru) Sporting Cristal	6	3	1	2	9	9	0	7		1–4	—	3–0	1–0
3	(Bolivia) The Strongest	6	2	0	4	7	12	−5	4		1–2	3–1	—	2–0
4	(Bolivia) Oriente Petrolero	6	1	0	5	5	14	−9	2		0–4	0–1	4–1	—

=== Group 3 ===
Group 3 standings
Pos	Team	Pld	W	D	L	GF	GA	GD	Pts	Qualification	(Brazil) CAM	(Chile) UE	(Brazil) SAO	(Chile) PAL
1	(Brazil) Atlético Mineiro	6	4	2	0	16	8	+8	10	Qualified to the semi-finals	—	5–1	1–1	2–0
2	(Chile) Unión Española	6	1	4	1	7	10	−3	6		1–1	—	1–1	0–0
3	(Brazil) São Paulo	6	1	3	2	6	7	−1	5		1–2	1–1	—	1–2
4	(Chile) Palestino	6	1	1	4	8	12	−4	3		4–5	2–3	0–1	—

=== Group 4 ===
Group 4 standings
Pos	Team	Pld	W	D	L	GF	GA	GD	Pts	Qualification	(Colombia) CAL	(Uruguay) PEÑ	(Colombia) JUN	(Uruguay) DAN
1	(Colombia) Deportivo Cali	6	3	2	1	5	3	+2	8	Qualified to the semi-finals	—	1–0	0–0	2–0
2	(Uruguay) Peñarol	6	3	0	3	7	7	0	6		0–2	—	1–0	4–2
3	(Colombia) Junior	6	1	4	1	1	1	0	6		0–0	1–0	—	0–0
4	(Uruguay) Danubio	6	1	2	3	6	8	−2	4		3–0	1–2	0–0	—

=== Group 5 ===
Group 5 standings
Pos	Team	Pld	W	D	L	GF	GA	GD	Pts	Qualification	(Paraguay) CCP	(Venezuela) POR	(Venezuela) ESM	(Paraguay) LIB
1	(Paraguay) Cerro Porteño	6	3	3	0	7	4	+3	9	Qualified to the semi-finals	—	1–0	1–1	1–0
2	(Venezuela) Portuguesa	6	2	2	2	5	5	0	6		1–1	—	1–2	1–0
3	(Venezuela) Estudiantes de Mérida	6	1	3	2	7	8	−1	5		2–3	0–0	—	1–1
4	(Paraguay) Libertad	6	1	2	3	4	6	−2	4		0–0	1–2	2–1	—

== Semi-finals ==
=== Group A ===
Pos	Team	Pld	W	D	L	GF	GA	GD	Pts	Qualification	(Argentina) BOC	(Argentina) RIV	(Brazil) CAM
1	(Argentina) Boca Juniors	4	3	1	0	7	2	+5	7	Qualified to the final	—	0–0	3–1
2	(Argentina) River Plate	4	1	1	2	1	3	−2	3		0–2	—	1–0
3	(Brazil) Atlético Mineiro	4	1	0	3	3	6	−3	2		1–2	1–0	—

=== Group B ===
Pos	Team	Pld	W	D	L	GF	GA	GD	Pts	Qualification	(Colombia) CAL	(Paraguay) CCP	(Peru) ALI
1	(Colombia) Deportivo Cali	4	3	1	0	12	4	+8	7	Qualified to the final	—	1–1	3–2
2	(Paraguay) Cerro Porteño	4	1	1	2	4	9	−5	3		0–4	—	3–1
3	(Peru) Alianza Lima	4	1	0	3	7	10	−3	2		1–4	3–0	—

==== Results ====
14 September 1978	Alianza Lima (Peru)	3–0	(Paraguay) Cerro Porteño	Lima

17 September 1978	Deportivo Cali (Colombia)	1–1	(Paraguay) Cerro Porteño	Cali

21 September 1978	Deportivo Cali (Colombia)	3–2	(Peru) Alianza Lima	Cali

5 October 1978	Cerro Porteño (Paraguay)	3–1	(Peru) Alianza Lima	Asunción

14 October 1978	Alianza Lima (Peru)	1–4	(Colombia) Deportivo Cali	Lima

18 October 1978	Cerro Porteño (Paraguay)	0–4	(Colombia) Deportivo Cali	Asunción

== Finals ==
Team 1	Agg.	Team 2	1st leg	2nd leg
Deportivo Cali (Colombia)	0–4	(Argentina) Boca Juniors	0–0	0–4

== Champion ==
1978 Copa Libertadores champions
(Argentina)
Boca Juniors
2nd title
