= 1977 Liga de Fútbol Profesional Boliviano =

Bolivian Primera División
- Season: 1977
- Champions: The Strongest

The 1977 Bolivian Primera División, the first division of Bolivian football (soccer), was played by 16 teams. The champion was The Strongest.

== First stage ==
=== Serie A ===
Pos	Team	Pld	W	D	L	GF	GA	GD	Pts
1	Oriente Petrolero	14	8	2	4	28	20	+8	18
2	Bolívar	14	7	3	4	34	16	+18	17
3	Always Ready	14	5	5	4	22	17	+5	15
4	Guabirá	14	5	5	4	29	25	+4	15
5	Bata	14	6	3	5	19	17	+2	15
6	Aurora	14	5	4	5	19	23	−4	14
7	Independiente Unificada	14	6	2	6	20	25	−5	14
8	Stormers	14	0	4	10	13	41	−28	4

=== Serie B ===
Pos	Team	Pld	W	D	L	GF	GA	GD	Pts
1	The Strongest	14	10	2	2	38	16	+22	22
2	Petrolero	14	9	4	1	39	19	+20	22
3	Blooming	14	7	2	5	33	27	+6	16
4	Jorge Wilstermann	14	6	4	4	29	25	+4	16
5	San José	14	6	3	5	33	24	+9	15
6	Deportivo Municipal	14	5	2	7	26	31	−5	12
7	20 de Agosto	14	2	1	11	22	55	−33	5
8	Real Santa Cruz	14	1	2	11	15	37	−22	4

== Second stage ==
=== Serie A ===
Pos	Team	Pld	W	D	L	GF	GA	GD	Pts
1	Bolívar	8	5	1	2	17	13	+4	11
2	The Strongest	8	4	1	3	15	10	+5	9
3	Blooming	8	4	1	3	16	12	+4	9
4	San José	8	4	1	3	15	16	−1	9
5	Guabirá	8	1	0	7	7	19	−12	2

==== Liguilla ====
Pos	Team	Pld	W	D	L	GF	GA	GD	Pts
1	The Strongest	2	2	0	0	7	1	+6	4
2	San José	2	0	1	1	3	5	−2	1
3	Blooming	2	0	1	1	2	6	−4	1

=== Serie B ===
Pos	Team	Pld	W	D	L	GF	GA	GD	Pts
1	Oriente Petrolero	8	4	3	1	11	6	+5	11
2	Jorge Wilstermann	8	4	2	2	14	10	+4	10
3	Always Ready	8	3	2	3	13	17	−4	8
4	Petrolero	8	1	4	3	8	10	−2	6
5	Bata	8	2	1	5	11	14	−3	5

== Final Group ==
Pos	Team	Pld	W	D	L	GF	GA	GD	Pts
1	Oriente Petrolero	6	4	0	2	13	9	+4	8
2	The Strongest	6	4	0	2	12	10	+2	8
3	Jorge Wilstermann	6	2	0	4	9	16	−7	4
4	Bolívar	6	2	0	4	10	9	+1	4

=== Title play-off ===
The Strongest	3–1	Oriente Petrolero
