= Noel Sanvicente =

Venezuelan footballer (born 1964)

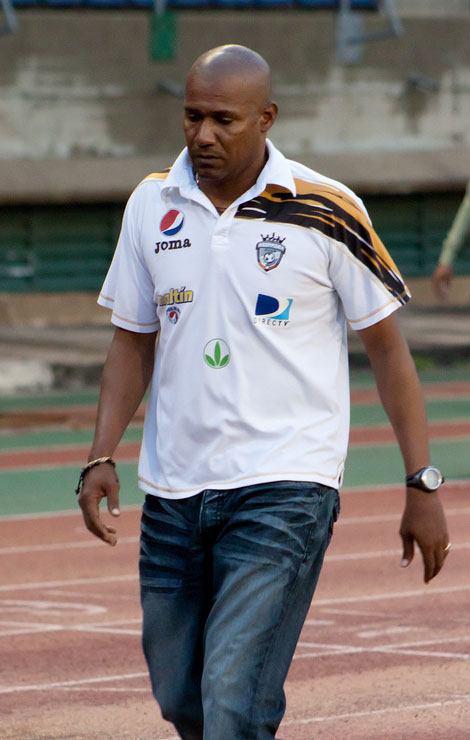
- Sanvicente with Real Esppor in 2011

Personal information
- Full name: Noel Sanvicente Bethelmy
- Date of birth: 21 December 1964 (age 61)
- Place of birth: San Félix, Venezuela
- Position: Forward

Team information
- Current team: Caracas (manager)

Senior career*
Years	Team	Apps	(Gls)
1980–1986	Mineros		
1986–1993	Marítimo de Venezuela		
1994–1996	Minervén		
1996	Caracas		

International career
1989–1990	Venezuela	10	(0)

Managerial career
- 2002–2010: Caracas
- 2010–2011: Real Esppor
- 2012–2014: Zamora
- 2014–2016: Venezuela
- 2017–2021: Caracas
- 2022: Zamora
- 2023–2024: Academia Puerto Cabello
- 2026: Zamora
- 2026–: Caracas
- * Club domestic league appearances and goals

Noel 'Chita' Sanvicente Bethelmy (born 21 December 1964) is a Venezuelan football manager and former player who played as a forward. He is the current manager of Caracas.

Sanvicente is a former head coach of the Venezuela national team. He is the most successful manager in the country's history, having won 13 national championship titles and one cup with four teams.

== Playing career ==
=== Club career ===
At the club level, Sanvicente played for Mineros de Guayana (1980–1986), C.S. Marítimo de Venezuela (1986–1993) winning 4 national championships with the team, Minervén Bolívar FC (1994–1996) winning another 2 championships, and finally ended his career at Caracas FC in 1996 due to a knee injury.

=== International career ===
Internationally, Sanvicente played 10 times for Venezuela, without scoring a goal. His international career began on 3 July 1989 at the 1989 Copa América in a First Round game against Colombia playing 36 minutes after entering as a substitute in the second half. He ended up playing 3 games at that Copa América, one of them as a starter.

== Managerial career ==
=== Caracas FC ===
Sanvincente served at Caracas FC since 2002, at the 2001–02 Venezuelan Primera División season when he was appointed manager just 4 games before the season ended. He is Caracas' most successful manager as he was able to win five titles in 2002–03, 2003–04, 2005–06, 2006–07, and most recently in 2008–09. He also led Caracas F.C. to its best ever position in South America's most prestigious club competition, the Copa Libertadores in 2009 where they reached the quarter-finals. He also won the 2009 Copa Venezuela

In 2010, Noel Sanvicente stepped down from the team following which Ceferino Bencomo took over as manager.

=== Real Esppor Club ===
For the 2010–11 Venezuelan Primera División season Sanvicente was appointed as the manager of Real Esppor Club (now called Deportivo La Guaira). At the end of the season the team ended up 1 point short of the title. The following season he continued as manager but after some disagreements with the team executives he quit on 2 December 2011.

=== Zamora FC ===
For the 2012–13 Venezuelan Primera División season Sanvicente was presented an offer to manage Deportivo Táchira, but due to the rivalry between Tachira and his ex-team Caracas FC, and being demanded immediate titles, he refused. He signed for Zamora FC, a team that was not being counted by the press as competitive enough to win that season, but against all odds the team defeated Deportivo Anzoátegui and won the title . The following season Sanvicente led the team to glory again, this time defeating his ex-team as a player Mineros de Guayana becoming the most successful manager of Venezuela.

=== Venezuela national football team ===
On 26 November 2007, the Venezuelan Football Federation announced the departure of Richard Páez as coach of the Venezuela national football team. Sanvicente was among the favourite options of the fans and the press to become the national team's manager, but after weeks of negotiations with him and several other coaches, the Venezuelan Football Federation chose César Farías to replace Paéz.

After Farías announced his resignation as coach, the press and fans started again to ask for the appointment of Sanvicente but the Federation did not choose a coach until 8 months later, when they officially announced Noel Sanvicente as coach of the national football team.

== Honours ==
=== Player ===
C.S. Marítimo de Venezuela

- Venezuelan Primera División (4): 1986–87, 1987–88, 1989–90, 1992–93

Minervén Bolívar FC

- Venezuelan Primera División (2): 1994–95, 1995–96

=== Manager ===
Caracas FC

- Venezuelan Primera División (6): 2002–03, 2003–04, 2005–06, 2006–07, 2008–09, 2019
- Copa Venezuela (1): 2009

Zamora FC

- Venezuelan Primera División (2): 2012–13, 2013–14
