= 1992 Copa CONMEBOL =

1st edition of the Copa CONMEBOL

Tournament details
- Teams: 16 (from 10 confederations)

Final positions
- Champions: (Brazil) Atlético Mineiro (1st title)
- Runners-up: (Paraguay) Olimpia

Tournament statistics
- Matches played: 30
- Goals scored: 64 (2.13 per match)
- Top scorer: (Brazil) Aílton (6)

The 1992 Copa CONMEBOL was the first edition of CONMEBOL's annual club tournament. Teams that failed to qualify for the Copa Libertadores played in this tournament. Sixteen teams from the ten South American football confederations qualified for this tournament. Atlético Mineiro defeated Olimpia in the finals.

== Teams ==
The following 16 teams from the 10 CONMEBOL member associations qualified for the tournament:

- Brazil: 4 berths
- Argentina: 3 berths
- Uruguay: 2 berths
- All other associations: 1 berth each

Association	Team (Berth)	Qualification method
Argentina (3 berths)	Vélez Sársfield	1991–92 Primera División 3rd place
Argentina (3 berths)	Gimnasia y Esgrima	1992 Torneo Octogonal finalist
Argentina (3 berths)	Deportivo Español	1992 Torneo Octogonal semifinalist
Bolivia (1 berth)	Oriente Petrolero	1991 Primera División 3rd place
Brazil (4 berths)	Bragantino	1991 Campeonato Brasileiro Série A runners-up
Brazil (4 berths)	Atlético Mineiro	1991 Campeonato Brasileiro Série A 3rd place
Brazil (4 berths)	Fluminense	1991 Campeonato Brasileiro Série A 4th place
Brazil (4 berths)	Grêmio	1991 Copa do Brasil runners-up
Chile (1 berth)	O'Higgins	1991 Liguilla Pre-Libertadores runners-up
Ecuador (1 berth)	El Nacional	1991 Serie A 3rd place
Colombia (1 berth)	Junior	1991 Primera A 3rd place
Paraguay (1 berths)	Olimpia	1991 Primera División 3rd place
Peru (1 berth)	Universitario	1991 Torneo Descentralizado 3rd place
Uruguay (2 berths)	Peñarol	1991 Liguilla Pre-Libertadores 3rd place
Uruguay (2 berths)	Danubio	1991 Liguilla Pre-Libertadores 4th place
Venezuela (1 berth)	Marítimo	1991–92 Primera División 3rd place

== Bracket ==
First round
(Argentina) Vélez Sarsfield	0	0	0
(Argentina) Deportivo Español	0	2	2
(Paraguay) Olimpia	4	1	5
(Bolivia) Oriente Petrolero	0	0	0
(Argentina) Gimnasia y Esgrima	0	2	2
(Chile) O'Higgins	0	0	0
(Uruguay) Peñarol	0	1	1 (7)
(Uruguay) Danubio	0	1	1 (6)
(Peru) Universitario	1	1	2
(Ecuador) El Nacional	3	3	6
(Brazil) Grêmio	2	1	3 (7)
(Brazil) Bragantino	2	1	3 (6)
(Brazil) Atlético Mineiro	1	5	6
(Brazil) Fluminense	2	1	3
(Colombia) Junior	6	1	7
(Venezuela) Marítimo	0	0	0

Quarterfinals
(Argentina) Deportivo Español	0	0	0 (3)
(Paraguay) Olimpia	0	0	0 (4)
(Argentina) Gimnasia y Esgrima	0	3	3
(Uruguay) Peñarol	0	1	1
(Ecuador) El Nacional	0	4	4
(Brazil) Grêmio	1	1	2
(Brazil) Atlético Mineiro	2	3	5
(Colombia) Junior	2	0	2

Semifinals
(Paraguay) Olimpia	0	0	0 (3)
(Argentina) Gimnasia y Esgrima	0	0	0 (0)
(Ecuador) El Nacional	1	0	1
(Brazil) Atlético Mineiro	0	2	2

Finals
(Paraguay) Olimpia	0	1	1
(Brazil) Atlético Mineiro	2	0	2

== First round ==
Team 1	Agg.	Team 2	1st leg	2nd leg
Vélez Sarsfield (Argentina)	0–2	(Argentina) Deportivo Español	0–0	0–2
Olimpia (Paraguay)	5–0	(Bolivia) Oriente Petrolero	4–0	1–0
Gimnasia y Esgrima (Argentina)	2–0	(Chile) O'Higgins	0–0	2–0
Peñarol (Uruguay)	1–1 (7–6 p)	(Uruguay) Danubio	0–0	1–1
Universitario (Peru)	2–6	(Ecuador) El Nacional	1–3	1–3
Grêmio (Brazil)	3–3 (7–6 p)	(Brazil) Bragantino	2–2	1–1
Atlético Mineiro (Brazil)	6–3	(Brazil) Fluminense	1–2	5–1
Junior (Colombia)	7–0	(Venezuela) Marítimo	6–0	1–0

== Quarterfinals ==
Team 1	Agg.	Team 2	1st leg	2nd leg
Deportivo Español (Argentina)	0–0 (3–4 p)	(Paraguay) Olimpia	0–0	0–0
Gimnasia y Esgrima (Argentina)	3–1	(Uruguay) Peñarol	0–0	3–1
El Nacional (Ecuador)	4–2	(Brazil) Grêmio	0–1	4–1
Atlético Mineiro (Brazil)	5–2	(Colombia) Junior	2–2	3–0

== Semifinals ==
Team 1	Agg.	Team 2	1st leg	2nd leg
Olimpia (Paraguay)	0–0 (3–0 p)	(Argentina) Gimnasia y Esgrima	0–0	0–0
Atlético Mineiro (Brazil)	2–1	(Ecuador) El Nacional	0–1	2–0

== Finals ==
Team 1	Agg.	Team 2	1st leg	2nd leg
Atlético Mineiro (Brazil)	2–1	(Paraguay) Olimpia	2–0	0–1
