= 1988 Copa Libertadores =

29th season of Copa Libertadores

1988 Copa Libertadores de América
Tournament details
- Dates: June 29 – October 26
- Teams: 21 (from 10 associations)

Final positions
- Champions: (Uruguay) Nacional (3rd title)
- Runners-up: (Argentina) Newell's Old Boys

Tournament statistics
- Matches played: 83
- Goals scored: 170 (2.05 per match)
- Top scorer: (Colombia) Arnoldo Iguarán (5)

The 1988 Copa Libertadores de América was the 29th edition of the Copa Libertadores, South America's premier international club football tournament organized by CONMEBOL. This season's defending champion Peñarol of Uruguay entered the tournament in the third stage, where they were defeated by San Lorenzo of Argentina. In the finals, Nacional defeated Newell's Old Boys for their third title.

== Qualified teams ==
Country	Team	Qualification method
CONMEBOL (1 berth)	Peñarol	1987 Copa Libertadores champion
Argentina (2 berths)	Newell's Old Boys	1987–88 Primera División champion
Argentina (2 berths)	San Lorenzo	1987–88 Liguilla Pre-Libertadores winner
Bolivia (2 berths)	Bolívar	1987 Primera División champion
Bolivia (2 berths)	Oriente Petrolero	1987 Primera División runner-up
Brazil (2 berths)	Sport Recife	1987 Campeonato Brasileiro Série A champion
Brazil (2 berths)	Guarani	1987 Campeonato Brasileiro Série A runner-up
Chile (2 berths)	Universidad Católica	1987 Primera División champion
Chile (2 berths)	Colo-Colo	1987 Liguilla Pre-Libertadores winner
Colombia (2 berths)	Millonarios	1987 Campeonato Profesional champion
Colombia (2 berths)	América de Cali	1987 Campeonato Profesional runner-up
Ecuador (2 berths)	Barcelona	1987 Campeonato Ecuatoriano champion
Ecuador (2 berths)	Filanbanco	1987 Campeonato Ecuatoriano runner-up
Paraguay (2 berths)	Cerro Porteño	1987 Primera División champion
Paraguay (2 berths)	Olimpia	1987 Primera División runner-up
Peru (2 berths)	Universitario	1987 Primera División champion
Peru (2 berths)	Alianza Lima	1987 Primera División runner-up
Uruguay (2 berths)	Montevideo Wanderers	1987 Liguilla Pre-Libertadores winner
Uruguay (2 berths)	Nacional	1987 Liguilla Pre-Libertadores runner-up
Venezuela (2 berths)	Marítimo	1986–87 Primera División champion
Venezuela (2 berths)	Unión Atlético Táchira	1986–87 Primera División runner-up

== Draw ==
The champions and runners-up of each football association were drawn into the same group along with another football association's participating teams. Three clubs from Uruguay competed as Peñarol was champion of the 1987 Copa Libertadores. They entered the tournament in the third stage.

Group 1	Group 2	Group 3	Group 4	Group 5
Chile; Venezuela	Argentina; Ecuador	Colombia; Uruguay	Bolivia; Paraguay	Brazil; Peru

== First stage ==
=== Group 1 ===
Pos	Team	Pld	W	D	L	GF	GA	GD	Pts	(Chile) UCA	(Chile) COL	(Venezuela) MAR	(Venezuela) TAC
1	(Chile) Universidad Católica	6	4	2	0	9	4	+5	10	—	1–0	2–1	3–1
2	(Chile) Colo-Colo	6	4	1	1	7	3	+4	9	2–2	—	1–0	2–0
3	(Venezuela) Marítimo	6	0	3	3	2	5	−3	3	0–0	0–1	—	1–1
4	(Venezuela) Unión Atlético Táchira	6	0	2	4	2	8	−6	2	0–1	0–1	0–0	—

=== Group 2 ===
Pos	Team	Pld	W	D	L	GF	GA	GD	Pts	(Argentina) NOB	(Argentina) SLO	(Ecuador) BAR	(Ecuador) FIL
1	(Argentina) Newell's Old Boys	6	2	4	0	5	1	+4	8	—	0–0	3–0	1–0
2	(Argentina) San Lorenzo	6	3	2	1	6	4	+2	8	0–0	—	2–1	2–0
3	(Ecuador) Barcelona	6	3	1	2	9	8	+1	7	0–0	2–0	—	4–2
4	(Ecuador) Filanbanco	6	0	1	5	5	12	−7	1	1–1	1–2	1–2	—

==== Tie-breaker ====
Newell's Old Boys and San Lorenzo played an extra match to determine the winner of the group.

August 7, 1988
--:--

Newell's Old Boys (Argentina)	1–0	(Argentina) San Lorenzo
Ramos ?'

El Coloso del Parque, Rosario

=== Group 3 ===
Pos	Team	Pld	W	D	L	GF	GA	GD	Pts	(Colombia) ACA	(Uruguay) NAC	(Colombia) MIL	(Uruguay) MWA
1	(Colombia) América de Cali	6	4	1	1	8	6	+2	9	—	0–0	2–1	1–0
2	(Uruguay) Nacional	6	3	2	1	8	7	+1	8	2–0	—	4–1	1–0
3	(Colombia) Millonarios	6	2	0	4	14	12	+2	4	2–3	6–1	—	3–0
4	(Uruguay) Montevideo Wanderers	6	1	1	4	3	8	−5	3	1–2	0–0	2–1	—

=== Group 4 ===
Pos	Team	Pld	W	D	L	GF	GA	GD	Pts	(Bolivia) OPE	(Bolivia) BOL	(Paraguay) CPO	(Paraguay) OLI
1	(Bolivia) Oriente Petrolero	6	3	1	2	8	8	0	7	—	1–3	2–2	1–0
2	(Bolivia) Bolívar	6	3	0	3	12	10	+2	6	1–2	—	2–0	2–0
3	(Paraguay) Cerro Porteño	6	2	2	2	6	7	−1	6	1–0	3–2	—	0–0
4	(Paraguay) Olimpia	6	2	1	3	6	7	−1	5	1–2	4–2	1–0	—

=== Group 5 ===
Pos	Team	Pld	W	D	L	GF	GA	GD	Pts	(Brazil) GUA	(Peru) UNI	(Brazil) REC	(Peru) ALI
1	(Brazil) Guarani	6	3	2	1	9	5	+4	8	—	1–1	4–1	1–0
2	(Peru) Universitario	6	2	4	0	5	2	+3	8	1–1	—	1–0	0–0
3	(Brazil) Sport Recife	6	2	1	3	7	6	+1	5	0–1	0–0	—	5–0
4	(Peru) Alianza Lima	6	1	1	4	2	10	−8	3	2–1	0–2	0–1	—

== Knockout phase ==
=== Bracket ===
Second stage
(Chile) Universidad Católica	1	0
(Uruguay) Nacional (a)	1	0
(Bolivia) Bolívar	1	0 (2)
(Argentina) Newell's Old Boys	0	1 (3)
(Colombia) América de Cali	1	2
(Peru) Universitario	0	2
(Bolivia) Oriente Petrolero	2	0
(Chile) Colo-Colo	1	0
(Argentina) San Lorenzo	1	1
(Brazil) Guarani	1	0

Third stage
(Uruguay) Nacional	1	2
(Argentina) Newell's Old Boys	1	1
(Colombia) América de Cali	1	2
(Bolivia) Oriente Petrolero	1	0
(Argentina) San Lorenzo	0	1
(Uruguay) Peñarol	0	0

Semifinals
(Uruguay) Nacional	1	1
(Colombia) América de Cali	0	1
(Argentina) San Lorenzo	0	1
(Argentina) Newell's Old Boys	1	2

Finals
(Uruguay) Nacional	0	3
(Argentina) Newell's Old Boys	1	0

=== Second stage ===
The group winners and runners-up were drawn in the second stage of the competition. The away goals rule was applied to determine the winner between Nacional and Universidad Católica.

Teams			Scores		Tie-breakers		
Team 1	Points	Team 2	1st leg	2nd leg	GD	AG	Pen.
Nacional (Uruguay)	2:2	(Chile) Universidad Católica	1–1	0–0	0–0	1–0	—
Universitario (Peru)	1:3	(Colombia) América de Cali	0–1	2–2	—	—	—
Colo-Colo (Chile)	1:3	(Bolivia) Oriente Petrolero	1–2	0–0	—	—	—
Guarani (Brazil)	1:3	(Argentina) San Lorenzo	1–1	0–1	—	—	—
Newell's Old Boys (Argentina)	2:2	(Bolivia) Bolívar	0–1	1–0	0–0	0–0	3–2

=== Third stage ===
The defending champion Peñarol entered the competition in this round. The three winners and the best-ranked loser advanced to the semifinals.

Teams			Scores		Tie-breakers		
Team 1	Points	Team 2	1st leg	2nd leg	GD	AG	Pen.
San Lorenzo (Argentina)	3:1	(Uruguay) Peñarol	0–0	1–0	—	—	—
Nacional (Uruguay)	3:1	(Argentina) Newell's Old Boys	1–1	2–1	—	—	—
América de Cali (Colombia)	3:1	(Bolivia) Oriente Petrolero	1–1	2–0	—	—	—

==== Ranking of losing teams ====
Pos	Team	Pld	W	D	L	GF	GA	GD	Pts
1	(Argentina) Newell's Old Boys	2	0	1	1	2	3	−1	1
2	(Uruguay) Peñarol	2	0	1	1	0	1	−1	1
3	(Bolivia) Oriente Petrolero	2	0	1	1	1	3	−2	1

=== Semifinals ===
Teams			Scores		Tie-breakers		
Team 1	Points	Team 2	1st leg	2nd leg	GD	AG	Pen.
San Lorenzo (Argentina)	0:4	(Argentina) Newell's Old Boys	0–1	1–2	—	—	—
América de Cali (Colombia)	1:3	(Uruguay) Nacional	0–1	1–1	—	—	—

=== Finals ===
19 October 1988

Newell's Old Boys	1–0	Nacional
Gabrich 60'	Report

Gigante de Arroyito, Rosario
Attendance: 45,000

26 October 1988

Nacional	3–0	Newell's Old Boys
Vargas 13'; Ostolaza 36'; De León 78'	Report

Centenario, Montevideo
Attendance: 75,000
