= Nelson Carrero =

Venezuelan footballer (born 1953)

Personal information
- Full name: Nelson José Carrero Hera
- Date of birth: February 8, 1953 (age 73)
- Position: Forward

Team information
- Current team: UA Maracaibo (manager)

Senior career*
Years	Team	Apps	(Gls)
- Deportivo Galicia
- ULA
- Deportivo Italia
- C.S. Marítimo de Venezuela
- Caracas F.C.

International career
1980	Venezuela Olympic		
1981–1985	Venezuela	21	
- * Club domestic league appearances and goals

Nelson José Carrero Hera (born 8 February 1953) is a former Venezuelan football player and current manager of UA Maracaibo. He played as an attacker.

== Club career ==
Carrero played for Deportivo Galicia, ULA, Deportivo Italia, C.S. Marítimo de Venezuela and Caracas F.C.

== International career ==
Carrero made 21 appearances for the senior Venezuela national football team from 1981 to 1985, including participation in the 1983 Copa América and 1987 Copa América.

He also competed for Venezuela at the 1980 Summer Olympics in Moscow, Soviet Union, where the team was eliminated after the preliminary round.
