= 1992 Copa Libertadores =

33rd season of Copa Libertadores

1992 Copa Libertadores de América
Tournament details
- Dates: February 18 – June 17
- Teams: 21 (from 10 associations)

Final positions
- Champions: (Brazil) São Paulo (1st title)
- Runners-up: (Argentina) Newell's Old Boys

Tournament statistics
- Matches played: 98
- Goals scored: 236 (2.41 per match)
- Top scorer: (Brazil) Palhinha (7 goals)

The 1992 Copa Libertadores was the 33rd edition of the Copa Libertadores, CONMEBOL's annual international club tournament. São Paulo won the competition.

== Qualified teams ==
Country	Team	Qualification method
CONMEBOL (1 berth)	Colo-Colo	1991 Copa Libertadores champion
Argentina (2 berths)	Newell's Old Boys	1990–91 Primera División champion
Argentina (2 berths)	San Lorenzo	1990–91 Liguilla Pre-Libertadores winner
Bolivia (2 berths)	Bolívar	1991 Primera División champion
Bolivia (2 berths)	San José	1991 Primera División runner-up
Brazil (2 berths)	São Paulo	1991 Campeonato Brasileiro Série A champion
Brazil (2 berths)	Criciúma	1991 Copa do Brasil champion
Chile (2 berths)	Coquimbo Unido	1991 Primera División runner-up
Chile (2 berths)	Universidad Católica	1991 Liguilla Pre-Libertadores winner
Colombia (2 berths)	Atlético Nacional	1991 Primera A champion
Colombia (2 berths)	América de Cali	1991 Primera A runner-up
Ecuador (2 berths)	Barcelona	1991 Campeonato Ecuatoriano champion
Ecuador (2 berths)	Valdez	1991 Campeonato Ecuatoriano runner-up
Paraguay (2 berths)	Sol de América	1991 Primera División champion
Paraguay (2 berths)	Cerro Porteño	1992 Pre-Libertadores playoff winner
Peru (2 berths)	Sporting Cristal	1991 Primera División champion
Peru (2 berths)	Sport Boys	1991 Primera División runner-up
Uruguay (2 berths)	Defensor Sporting	1991 Liguilla Pre-Libertadores winner
Uruguay (2 berths)	Nacional	1991 Liguilla Pre-Libertadores runner-up
Venezuela (2 berths)	Universidad de Los Andes	1990–91 Primera División champion
Venezuela (2 berths)	Marítimo	1990–91 Primera División runner-up

== Draw ==
The champions and runners-up of each football association were drawn into the same group along with another football association's participating teams. Three clubs from Chile competed as Colo-Colo was champion of the 1991 Copa Libertadores.

Group 1	Group 2	Group 3	Group 4	Group 5
Argentina; Chile	Bolivia; Brazil	Ecuador; Venezuela	Colombia; Peru	Paraguay; Uruguay

== Group stage ==
=== Group 1 ===
Colo-Colo, as the previous year champions, should join the competition only in the Round of 16, but they requested to start the competition in the group stage, due to financial reasons, thus five clubs participated in this group.

Group 1 standings
Pos	Team	Pld	W	D	L	GF	GA	GD	Pts	Qualification	(Argentina) NOB	(Chile) UC	(Argentina) SLO	(Chile) COL	(Chile) COQ
1	(Argentina) Newell's Old Boys	8	4	3	1	11	10	+1	11	Round of 16	—	0–0	0–6	3–1	3–0
2	(Chile) Universidad Católica	8	2	5	1	15	8	+7	9	Round of 16	1–1	—	4–0	0–0	5–1
3	(Argentina) San Lorenzo	8	4	1	3	13	8	+5	9	Round of 16	0–1	2–2	—	1–0	3–0
4	(Chile) Colo-Colo	8	2	4	2	6	7	−1	8	Round of 16	1–1	1–1	1–0	—	1–0
5	(Chile) Coquimbo Unido	8	1	1	6	6	18	−12	3		1–2	3–2	0–1	1–1	—

Legend: Blue = home team win; Yellow = draw; Red = away team win.

=== Group 2 ===
Group 2 standings
Pos	Team	Pld	W	D	L	GF	GA	GD	Pts	Qualification	(Brazil) CRI	(Brazil) SAO	(Bolivia) BOL	(Bolivia) SJO
1	(Brazil) Criciúma	6	4	1	1	13	7	+6	9	Round of 16	—	3–0	2–1	5–0
2	(Brazil) São Paulo	6	3	2	1	11	5	+6	8	Round of 16	4–0	—	2–0	1–1
3	(Bolivia) Bolívar	6	2	2	2	9	9	0	6	Round of 16	1–1	1–1	—	2–1
4	(Bolivia) San José	6	0	1	5	5	17	−12	1		1–2	0–3	2–4	—

Legend: Blue = home team win; Yellow = draw; Red = away team win.

=== Group 3 ===
Group 3 standings
Pos	Team	Pld	W	D	L	GF	GA	GD	Pts	Qualification	(Ecuador) BAR	(Ecuador) VAL	(Venezuela) MAR	(Venezuela) ULA
1	(Ecuador) Barcelona	6	4	2	0	11	3	+8	10	Round of 16	—	0–0	3–1	5–1
2	(Ecuador) Valdez	6	2	2	2	5	4	+1	6	Round of 16	0–1	—	2–1	1–1
3	(Venezuela) Marítimo	6	1	2	3	5	8	−3	4	Round of 16	1–1	1–0	—	1–2
4	(Venezuela) Universidad de Los Andes	6	1	2	3	4	10	−6	4		0–1	0–2	0–0	—

Legend: Blue = home team win; Yellow = draw; Red = away team win.
- As Marítimo and Universidad de Los Andes finished with the same number of points, a playoff to define the third-placed team was played. Marítimo beat Universidad de Los Andes and qualified to the Round of 16.

==== Tiebreaker ====
- Marítimo qualify due to better goal difference in group.

Team 1	Score	Team 2
Marítimo (Venezuela)	2–2	(Venezuela) Universidad de Los Andes

=== Group 4 ===
Group 4 standings
Pos	Team	Pld	W	D	L	GF	GA	GD	Pts	Qualification	(Colombia) NAC	(Colombia) AME	(Peru) CRI	(Peru) SBA
1	(Colombia) Atlético Nacional	6	4	1	1	15	4	+11	9	Round of 16	—	3–0	1–0	2–2
2	(Colombia) América de Cali	6	4	0	2	8	7	+1	8	Round of 16	2–0	—	1–0	2–0
3	(Peru) Sporting Cristal	6	2	1	3	6	7	−1	5	Round of 16	0–3	3–1	—	2–0
4	(Peru) Sport Boys	6	0	2	4	4	15	−11	2		0–6	1–2	1–1	—

Legend: Blue = home team win; Yellow = draw; Red = away team win.

=== Group 5 ===
Group 5 standings
Pos	Team	Pld	W	D	L	GF	GA	GD	Pts	Qualification	(Paraguay) CPO	(Uruguay) NAC	(Uruguay) DEF	(Paraguay) SOL
1	(Paraguay) Cerro Porteño	6	3	3	0	9	4	+5	9	Round of 16	—	1–1	1–1	2–0
2	(Uruguay) Nacional	6	2	3	1	9	7	+2	7	Round of 16	0–0	—	2–3	2–2
3	(Uruguay) Defensor Sporting	6	1	2	3	7	9	−2	4	Round of 16	2–3	0–1	—	1–2
4	(Paraguay) Sol de América	6	1	2	3	5	10	−5	4		0–2	1–3	0–0	—

Legend: Blue = home team win; Yellow = draw; Red = away team win.

== Knockout stage ==
Round of 16; 28–30 April—4–6 May
(Bolivia) Bolívar	2	0	2
(Paraguay) Cerro Porteño	0	3	3
(Chile) Colo-Colo	1	0	1
(Ecuador) Barcelona	0	2	2
(Brazil) Criciúma	2	3	5
(Peru) Sporting Cristal	1	2	3
(Uruguay) Nacional	0	0	0
(Brazil) São Paulo	1	2	3
(Venezuela) Marítimo	0	0	0
(Colombia) Atlético Nacional	0	3	3
(Chile) Universidad Católica	0	0	0
(Colombia) América de Cali	0	1	1
(Argentina) San Lorenzo	2	0	2 (6)
(Ecuador) Valdez	0	2	2 (5)
(Uruguay) Defensor Sporting	1	0	1
(Argentina) Newell's Old Boys	1	1	2

Quarterfinals; 13–20 May
(Paraguay) Cerro Porteño	1	1	2 (3)
(Ecuador) Barcelona	1	1	2 (4)
(Brazil) Criciúma	0	1	1
(Brazil) São Paulo	1	1	2
(Colombia) Atlético Nacional	0	2	2
(Colombia) América de Cali	1	4	5
(Argentina) San Lorenzo	0	1	1
(Argentina) Newell's Old Boys	4	1	5

Semifinals; 27 May–3 June
(Ecuador) Barcelona	0	2	2
(Brazil) São Paulo	3	0	3
(Colombia) América de Cali	1	1	2 (10)
(Argentina) Newell's Old Boys	1	1	2 (11)

Final; 10–17 June
(Brazil) São Paulo	0	1	1 (3)
(Argentina) Newell's Old Boys	1	0	1 (2)

== Finals ==
=== First leg ===
10 June 1992	Newell's Old Boys (Argentina)	1–0	(Brazil) São Paulo	Estadio Gigante de Arroyito, Rosario
	Berizzo 39' (pen.)			Attendance: 45,000; Referee: Hernán Silva (Chile)

=== Second leg ===
17 June 1992	São Paulo (Brazil)	1–0 (3–2 p)	(Argentina) Newell's Old Boys	Estádio Cícero Pompeu de Toledo (Morumbi), São Paulo
	Raí 65' (pen.)			Attendance: 105,185; Referee: José Torres Cadena (Colombia)
	Penalties
	Raí (penalty scored); Iván (penalty scored); Ronaldão (penalty missed); Cafú (penalty scored)		(penalty missed) Berizzo; (penalty scored) Zamora; (penalty scored) Llop; (penalty missed) Mendoza; (penalty missed) Gamboa

Copa Libertadores
1992 Winner

São Paulo
First Title
