= Alfarabi Romero =

Venezuelan football manager (born 1965)

Personal information
- Full name: Alfarabi José Romero Romero
- Date of birth: 29 September 1965 (age 61)
- Place of birth: La Guaira, Venezuela
- Position: Defender

Team information
- Current team: Inter de Barinas (assistant)

Senior career*
| Years | Team | Apps | (Gls) |
| 1990–1995 | Marítimo de Venezuela | | |

Managerial career
- Caracas (youth)
- 2010–2011: Caracas (assistant)
- 2012: Pellícano
- 2013: Yaracuy
- 2013–2014: Deportivo Petare (youth)
- 2014–2015: Caracas (youth)
- 2016: Caracas B
- 2016–2017: Academia Puerto Cabello
- 2017–2018: Universidad Central
- 2019: Yaracuy (assistant)
- 2020–2021: Zamora (assistant)
- 2021: Zamora (interim)
- 2023: Marítimo de La Guaira
- 2024–: Inter de Barinas (assistant)
- 2024: Inter de Barinas (interim)
- * Club domestic league appearances and goals

Alfarabi José Romero Romero (born 29 September 1965) is a Venezuelan football manager and former player who played as a defender. He is the current manager of Carabobo.

== Career ==
Born in La Guaira, Romero featured for local sides before retiring, notably representing Marítimo de Venezuela in two Copa Libertadores editions. After retiring, he worked at Caracas as a youth and assistant coach before being named at the helm of Pellícano in 2012.

Romero was subsequently in charge of Yaracuy and of Deportivo Petare's youth setup before returning to Caracas in 2014, where he worked as a youth and B-team manager. On 7 October 2016, he was named manager of Academia Puerto Cabello, but was dismissed the following 17 May.

In June 2017, Romero was appointed manager of Universidad Central, but left the club on 27 March of the following year. He subsequently worked as an assistant manager of Yaracuy and Zamora, being named interim manager of the latter on 31 August 2021.

== Honours ==
=== Player ===
Marítimo de Venezuela

- Venezuelan Primera División: 1992–93
