= 1990 Copa Libertadores =

31st season of Copa Libertadores

1990 Copa Libertadores de América
Tournament details
- Dates: February 25 – October 10
- Teams: 19 (from 10 associations)

Final positions
- Champions: (Paraguay) Olimpia (2nd title)
- Runners-up: (Ecuador) Barcelona

Tournament statistics
- Matches played: 83
- Goals scored: 184 (2.22 per match)
- Top scorer: (Paraguay) Adriano Samaniego (7 Goals)

The Copa Libertadores 1990 was the 31st edition of the Copa Libertadores, South America's premier international club football tournament organized by CONMEBOL. Olimpia won the 1990 edition after defeating Barcelona with a 3-1 aggregate in the finals. One of the players for Olimpia was legendary goalkeeper Ever Hugo Almeida, who retired from professional football the following year.

== Qualified teams ==
Country	Team	Qualification method
CONMEBOL (1 berth)	Atlético Nacional	1989 Copa Libertadores champion
Argentina (2 berths)	Independiente	1988–89 Primera División champion
Argentina (2 berths)	River Plate	1988–89 Liguilla Pre-Libertadores winner
Bolivia (2 berths)	The Strongest	1989 Primera División champion
Bolivia (2 berths)	Oriente Petrolero	1989 Primera División runner-up
Brazil (2 berths)	Vasco da Gama	1989 Campeonato Brasileiro Série A champion
Brazil (2 berths)	Grêmio	1989 Copa do Brasil champion
Chile (2 berths)	Colo-Colo	1989 Primera División champion
Chile (2 berths)	Universidad Católica	1989 Liguilla Pre-Libertadores winner
Ecuador (2 berths)	Barcelona	1989 Campeonato Ecuatoriano champion
Ecuador (2 berths)	Emelec	1989 Campeonato Ecuatoriano runner-up
Paraguay (2 berths)	Olimpia	1989 Primera División champion
Paraguay (2 berths)	Cerro Porteño	1990 Pre-Libertadores playoff winner
Peru (2 berths)	Unión Huaral	1989 Primera División champion
Peru (2 berths)	Sporting Cristal	1989 Primera División runner-up
Uruguay (2 berths)	Defensor Sporting	1989 Liguilla Pre-Libertadores winner
Uruguay (2 berths)	Progreso	1989 Liguilla Pre-Libertadores runner-up
Venezuela (2 berths)	Mineros de Guayana	1988–89 Primera División champion
Venezuela (2 berths)	Pepeganga Margarita	1988–89 Primera División runner-up

== Draw ==
The champions and runners-up of each football association were drawn into the same group along with another football association's participating teams. Only one club from Colombia competed as Atlético Nacional was champion of the 1989 Copa Libertadores. They entered the tournament in the Second round.

Group 1	Group 2	Group 3	Group 4	Group 5
Bolivia; Ecuador	Argentina	Chile; Peru	Uruguay; Venezuela	Brazil; Paraguay

== Group stage ==
=== Group 1 ===
Pos	Team	Pld	W	D	L	GF	GA	GD	Pts	Qualification	(Ecuador) EME	(Bolivia) STR	(Ecuador) BAR	(Bolivia) ORI
1	(Ecuador) Emelec	6	2	2	2	9	8	+1	6	Second Round	—	1–0	3–1	2–2
2	(Bolivia) The Strongest	6	3	0	3	8	7	+1	6	Second Round	4–3	—	2–1	2–0
3	(Ecuador) Barcelona	6	2	2	2	6	7	−1	6	Second Round	0–0	1–0	—	2–1
4	(Bolivia) Oriente Petrolero	6	2	2	2	6	7	−1	6		1–0	1–0	1–1	—

Legend: Blue = home team win; Yellow = draw; Red = away team win.

==== Tiebreaker ====
Teams			Scores		
1st leg home team	Points	2nd leg home team	1st leg	2nd leg	Pen.
Barcelona (Ecuador)	3–3	(Bolivia) Oriente Petrolero	3–1	2–3	5–4

=== Group 2 ===
- Note: The other two Colombian teams that qualified for the tournament withdrew due to logistical issues, as CONMEBOL banned Colombia from hosting matches due to threats made by drug lords to referees in the previous tournament in 1989, with the murder of one of them interrupting the league without a champion being declared. The champion, Atletico Nacional of Medellín, had a bye to the second round as the current champion, but had to play their home games in Chile for this tournament.

Pos	Team	Pld	W	D	L	GF	GA	GD	Pts	Qualification	(Argentina) IND	(Argentina) RPL
1	(Argentina) Independiente	2	1	1	0	1	0	+1	3	Second Round	—	1–0
2	(Argentina) River Plate	2	0	1	1	0	1	−1	1	Second Round	0–0	—

Legend: Blue = home team win; Yellow = draw; Red = away team win.

=== Group 3 ===
Pos	Team	Pld	W	D	L	GF	GA	GD	Pts	Qualification	(Chile) COL	(Chile) UCA	(Peru) UHU	(Peru) CRI
1	(Chile) Colo-Colo	6	3	2	1	9	5	+4	8	Second Round	—	1–2	3–1	2–0
2	(Chile) Universidad Católica	6	2	3	1	6	4	+2	7	Second Round	0–0	—	2–2	2–0
3	(Peru) Unión Huaral	6	1	3	2	5	9	−4	5	Second Round	1–1	1–0	—	0–3
4	(Peru) Sporting Cristal	6	1	2	3	4	6	−2	4		1–2	0–0	0–0	—

Legend: Blue = home team win; Yellow = draw; Red = away team win.

=== Group 4 ===
Pos	Team	Pld	W	D	L	GF	GA	GD	Pts	Qualification	(Uruguay) PRO	(Uruguay) DEF	(Venezuela) PMA	(Venezuela) MGU
1	(Uruguay) Progreso	6	2	3	1	7	4	+3	7	Second Round	—	1–1	2–0	1–1
2	(Uruguay) Defensor Sporting	6	2	3	1	5	3	+2	7	Second Round	0–0	—	1–0	3–1
3	(Venezuela) Pepeganga Margarita	6	3	0	3	4	5	−1	6	Second Round	1–0	1–0	—	2–1
4	(Venezuela) Mineros de Guayana	6	1	2	3	5	9	−4	4		1–3	0–0	1–0	—

Legend: Blue = home team win; Yellow = draw; Red = away team win.

==== Tiebreaker ====
Team 1	Score	Team 2
Progreso (Uruguay)	4–0	(Uruguay) Defensor Sporting

=== Group 5 ===
Pos	Team	Pld	W	D	L	GF	GA	GD	Pts	Qualification	(Paraguay) OLI	(Paraguay) CPO	(Brazil) VGA	(Brazil) GRÊ
1	(Paraguay) Olimpia	6	3	1	2	9	8	+1	7	Second Round	—	2–1	2–1	1–0
2	(Paraguay) Cerro Porteño	6	2	2	2	8	8	0	6	Second Round	3–2	—	1–1	3–1
3	(Brazil) Vasco da Gama	6	2	2	2	5	5	0	6	Second Round	1–0	2–0	—	0–0
4	(Brazil) Grêmio	6	1	3	2	5	6	−1	5		2–2	0–0	2–0	—

Legend: Blue = home team win; Yellow = draw; Red = away team win.

== Bracket ==
Round of 16
(Chile) Universidad Católica	3	1	4
(Bolivia) The Strongest	1	1	2
(Chile) Colo-Colo	0	3	3 (4)
(Brazil) Vasco da Gama (p)	0	3	3 (5)
(Paraguay) Cerro Porteño	0	0	0
(Colombia) Atlético Nacional	0	1	1
(Uruguay) Defensor Sporting	1	1	2
(Argentina) River Plate	2	2	4
(Venezuela) Pepeganga Margarita	0	0	0
(Argentina) Independiente	3	6	9
(Peru) Unión Huaral	1	0	1
(Ecuador) Emelec	0	2	2
(Ecuador) Barcelona	2	2	4
(Uruguay) Progreso	0	2	2

Quarterfinals
(Paraguay) Olimpia	2	4	6
(Chile) Universidad Católica	0	4	4
(Brazil) Vasco da Gama	0	0	0
(Colombia) Atlético Nacional	0	1	1
(Argentina) River Plate	2	1	3
(Argentina) Independiente	0	1	1
(Ecuador) Emelec	0	0	0
(Ecuador) Barcelona	0	1	1

Semifinals
(Paraguay) Olimpia (p)	2	2	4 (2)
(Colombia) Atlético Nacional	1	3	4 (1)
(Argentina) River Plate	1	0	1 (3)
(Ecuador) Barcelona (p)	0	1	1 (4)

Finals
(Paraguay) Olimpia	2	1	3
(Ecuador) Barcelona	0	1	1

== Second round ==
Team 1	Agg.	Team 2	1st leg	2nd leg
Universidad Católica (Chile)	4–2	(Bolivia) The Strongest	3–1	1–1
Colo-Colo (Chile)	3–3 (4–5 p)	(Brazil) Vasco da Gama	0–0	3–3
Cerro Porteño (Paraguay)	0–1	(Colombia) Atlético Nacional	0–0	0–1
Defensor Sporting (Uruguay)	2–4	(Argentina) River Plate	1–2	1–2
Pepeganga Margarita (Venezuela)	0–9	(Argentina) Independiente	0–6	0–3
Unión Huaral (Peru)	1–2	(Ecuador) Emelec	1–0	0–2
Barcelona (Ecuador)	4–2	(Uruguay) Progreso	2–0	2–2
Olimpia (Paraguay)	bye^{1}			

^{1} Olimpia had been drawn to face the third-placed team from Group 2, but that group was reduced to two teams after the withdrawal of Colombian teams.

== Quarter-finals ==
- Note: Second leg between Vasco da Gama and Atlético Nacional was a replay in Santiago (Chile). The original match ended with a victory by 2-0 for Atlético Nacional, but it was annulled following a protest by Vasco da Gama complaining of pressure on the referee by local drug lords.

Team 1	Agg.	Team 2	1st leg	2nd leg
Vasco da Gama (Brazil)	0–1	(Colombia) Atlético Nacional	0–0	0–1
Emelec (Ecuador)	0–1	(Ecuador) Barcelona	0–0	0–1
River Plate (Argentina)	3–1	(Argentina) Independiente	2–0	1–1
Olimpia (Paraguay)	6–4	(Chile) Universidad Católica	2–0	4–4

== Semifinals ==
Team 1	Agg.	Team 2	1st leg	2nd leg
River Plate (Argentina)	1–1 (3–4 p)	(Ecuador) Barcelona	1–0	0–1
Olimpia (Paraguay)	4–4 (2–1 p)	(Colombia) Atlético Nacional	2–1	2–3

== Finals ==
Team 1	Agg.	Team 2	1st leg	2nd leg
Olimpia (Paraguay)	3–1	(Ecuador) Barcelona	2–0	1–1

=== First leg ===
October 3, 1990
21:10 (UTC-3)
First leg

Olimpia (Paraguay)	2–0	(Ecuador) Barcelona
Amarilla 46'; Samaniego 70'	Report

Estadio Defensores del Chaco, Asunción
Attendance: 35,000
Referee: Juan Cardellino (Uruguay)

=== Second leg ===
October 10, 1990
Second leg

Barcelona (Ecuador)	1–1	(Paraguay) Olimpia
Trobbiani 61'	Report	Amarilla 80'

Estadio Monumental, Guayaquil
Attendance: 55,000
Referee: Juan Carlos Loustau (Argentina)
