= 1988–89 Venezuelan Primera División season =

Venezuelan Primera División
- Season: 1988–89
- Champions: Mineros de Guayana (1st title)

The 1988–89 season of the Venezuelan Primera División, the top category of Venezuelan football, was played by 16 teams. The national champions were Mineros de Guayana.

== Results ==
=== Standings ===
Pos	Team	Pld	W	D	L	GF	GA	GD	Pts
1	Mineros de Guayana	30	18	10	2	68	26	+42	46
2	Pepeganga Margarita	30	19	7	4	54	24	+30	45
3	Marítimo	30	17	7	6	40	23	+17	41
4	Atlético Zamora	30	13	10	7	45	20	+25	36
5	Unión Atlético Táchira	30	13	9	8	68	34	+34	35
6	Universidad de Los Andes	30	13	8	9	38	40	−2	34
7	Minervén	30	9	15	6	37	32	+5	33
8	Caracas	30	11	10	9	51	39	+12	32
9	Portuguesa	30	12	6	12	36	25	+11	30
10	Deportivo Italia	30	11	7	12	37	40	−3	29
11	Estudiantes de Mérida	30	9	10	11	39	32	+7	28
12	Unión Deportivo Lara	30	10	7	13	35	37	−2	27
13	Deportivo Galicia	30	5	14	11	25	40	−15	24
14	Atlético Anzoátegui	30	7	8	15	20	45	−25	22
15	Arroceros de Calabozo	30	2	5	23	26	90	−64	9
16	Peninsulares de Araya	30	2	5	23	21	83	−62	9
