= 1989–90 Venezuelan Primera División season =

Venezuelan Primera División
- Season: 1989–90
- Champions: Marítimo (3rd title)

The 1989–90 season of the Venezuelan Primera División, the top category of Venezuelan football, was played by 16 teams. The national champions were Marítimo.

== Results ==
=== First stage ===
Pos	Team	Pld	W	D	L	GF	GA	GD	Pts
1	Unión Atlético Táchira	30	17	9	4	59	32	+27	43
2	Marítimo	30	15	13	2	43	18	+25	43
3	Minervén	30	18	6	6	47	23	+24	42
4	Universidad de Los Andes	30	13	10	7	41	33	+8	36
5	Caracas	30	13	10	7	38	33	+5	36
6	Pepeganga Margarita	30	11	11	8	42	32	+10	33
7	Mineros de Guayana	30	12	8	10	45	37	+8	32
8	Atlético Zamora	30	9	10	11	22	21	+1	28
9	Deportivo Italia	30	8	12	10	35	39	−4	28
10	Portuguesa	30	9	10	11	38	41	−3	28
11	Trujillanos	30	7	12	11	29	38	−9	26
12	Maracaibo FC	30	8	8	14	27	38	−11	24
13	Estudiantes de Mérida	30	5	14	11	24	43	−19	24
14	Unión Deportivo Lara	30	7	8	15	19	29	−10	22
15	Internacional	30	6	9	15	27	45	−18	21
16	Deportivo Galicia	30	3	8	19	22	56	−34	14

=== Championship playoff ===
May 27, 1990

Marítimo	2–0	Unión Atlético Táchira
