= 1987–88 Venezuelan Primera División season =

Venezuelan Primera División
- Season: 1987–88
- Champions: Marítimo (2nd title)

The 1987–88 season of the Venezuelan Primera División, the top category of Venezuelan football, was played by 14 teams. The national champions were Marítimo.

== Results ==
=== First stage ===
| Pos | Team | Pld | W | D | L | GF | GA | GD | Pts |
|---|---|---|---|---|---|---|---|---|---|
| 1 | Marítimo | 26 | 11 | 11 | 4 | 28 | 10 | +18 | 33 |
| 2 | Caracas | 26 | 12 | 7 | 7 | 39 | 29 | +10 | 31 |
| 3 | Mineros de Guayana | 26 | 11 | 9 | 6 | 38 | 35 | +3 | 31 |
| 4 | Portuguesa | 26 | 11 | 8 | 7 | 32 | 22 | +10 | 30 |
| 5 | Unión Deportivo Lara | 26 | 10 | 10 | 6 | 30 | 26 | +4 | 30 |
| 6 | Atlético Zamora | 26 | 10 | 10 | 6 | 29 | 27 | +2 | 30 |
| 7 | Pepeganga Margarita | 26 | 10 | 9 | 7 | 46 | 31 | +15 | 29 |
| 8 | Unión Atlético Táchira | 26 | 11 | 6 | 9 | 60 | 33 | +27 | 28 |
| 9 | Universidad de Los Andes | 26 | 9 | 9 | 8 | 36 | 34 | +2 | 27 |
| 10 | Atlético Anzoátegui | 26 | 7 | 10 | 9 | 29 | 42 | −13 | 24 |
| 11 | Estudiantes de Mérida | 26 | 7 | 7 | 12 | 31 | 36 | −5 | 21 |
| 12 | Deportivo Italia | 26 | 7 | 7 | 12 | 24 | 34 | −10 | 21 |
| 13 | Peninsulares de Araya | 26 | 6 | 9 | 11 | 25 | 52 | −27 | 21 |
| 14 | Universidad Central | 26 | 1 | 6 | 19 | 17 | 53 | −36 | 8 |

=== Final Stage ===
| Pos | Team | Pld | W | D | L | GF | GA | GD | Pts |
|---|---|---|---|---|---|---|---|---|---|
| 1 | Marítimo | 14 | 12 | 1 | 1 | 20 | 4 | +16 | 25 |
| 2 | Deportivo Táchira | 14 | 9 | 2 | 3 | 26 | 12 | +14 | 20 |
| 3 | Caracas | 14 | 8 | 1 | 5 | 17 | 13 | +4 | 17 |
| 4 | Atlético Zamora | 14 | 5 | 4 | 5 | 15 | 15 | 0 | 14 |
| 5 | Unión Deportivo Lara | 14 | 5 | 1 | 8 | 14 | 19 | −5 | 11 |
| 6 | Pepeganga Margarita | 14 | 3 | 3 | 8 | 13 | 19 | −6 | 9 |
| 7 | Portuguesa | 14 | 2 | 4 | 8 | 11 | 20 | −9 | 8 |
| 8 | Mineros de Guayana | 14 | 3 | 2 | 9 | 14 | 28 | −14 | 8 |
