= 1991 Categoría Primera A season =

Copa Mustang
- Season: 1991
- Champions: Atlético Nacional (5th title)
- Copa Libertadores: Atlético Nacional; América de Cali
- Copa CONMEBOL: Junior
- Matches: 336
- Goals: 880 (2.62 per match)
- Top goalscorer: Iván Valenciano (30 goals)

The 1991 Copa Mustang was the forty-fourth season of Colombia's top-flight football league, and the first edition played under the Categoría Primera A denomination due to the creation of the second division tournament Categoría Primera B.

Atlético Nacional won the league for the fifth time after winning the final quadrangular, clinching the title with a 2–1 win over the defending champions América de Cali.

== Format ==
The season was split into four parts: Torneo Apertura, Torneo Finalización, semifinal quadrangulars, and final quadrangular. In the Torneo Apertura, the 15 participating teams played 12 matches, while in the Torneo Finalización, the 15 teams played each other twice in a double round-robin tournament for a total of 28 matches. The results of both the Apertura and the Finalización were combined into an aggregate table (Reclasificación), with the top eight teams in that table at the end of the season's 40 rounds advancing to the semifinal quadrangulars. The top four teams in both the Apertura and Finalización tournaments were awarded bonus points for the final stages (semifinal and final quadrangulars), with the following scale being used: 1.00, 0.75, 0.50, and 0.25.

In the semifinal quadrangulars, the eight participating teams were divided into two groups of four in which they played each of their group rivals twice, with the top two teams of each group advancing to the final quadrangular, in which they again played their other group rivals twice. The team that topped the final quadrangular was the champion, being joined in the 1992 Copa Libertadores by the runners-up, whilst the team placing third in that final group qualified for the first edition of the Copa CONMEBOL.

Although the second tier tournament held its first edition in this year, no teams were relegated.

== Teams ==
Locations of the 1991 Categoría Primera A teams

Fifteen teams took part in the season, all of them also participating in the previous edition. This was the final year in which Sporting de Barranquilla took part in the competition, selling its license at the end of the season.

Team	City	Stadium
América de Cali	Cali	Olímpico Pascual Guerrero
Atlético Bucaramanga	Bucaramanga	Alfonso López
Atlético Nacional	Medellín	Atanasio Girardot
Cúcuta Deportivo	Cúcuta	General Santander
Deportes Quindío	Armenia	Centenario
Deportes Tolima	Ibagué	Manuel Murillo Toro
Deportivo Cali	Cali	Olímpico Pascual Guerrero
Deportivo Pereira	Pereira	Hernán Ramírez Villegas
Independiente Medellín	Medellín	Atanasio Girardot
Junior	Barranquilla	Metropolitano Roberto Meléndez
Millonarios	Bogotá	El Campín
Once Caldas	Manizales	Fernando Londoño Londoño
Santa Fe	Bogotá	El Campín
Sporting	Barranquilla	Romelio Martínez
Unión Magdalena	Santa Marta	Eduardo Santos

== Torneo Apertura ==
Pos	Team	Pld	W	D	L	GF	GA	GD	Pts	Bonus
1	Millonarios	12	6	4	2	25	13	+12	16	+1.00 points
2	Santa Fe	12	6	3	3	20	11	+9	15	+0.75 points
3	Atlético Bucaramanga	12	5	5	2	20	11	+9	15	+0.50 points
4	Independiente Medellín	12	5	4	3	14	10	+4	14	+0.25 points
5	Junior	12	5	4	3	17	15	+2	14	
6	Deportes Quindío	12	6	1	5	17	15	+2	13	
7	Atlético Nacional	12	5	3	4	14	11	+3	13	
8	Deportivo Cali	12	4	5	3	14	11	+3	13	
9	Sporting	12	4	4	4	17	14	+3	12	
10	Unión Magdalena	12	4	4	4	12	11	+1	12	
11	Once Caldas	12	4	3	5	15	22	−7	11	
12	América de Cali	12	3	5	4	15	16	−1	11	
13	Deportivo Pereira	12	3	4	5	10	12	−2	10	
14	Deportes Tolima	12	2	2	8	9	26	−17	6	
15	Cúcuta Deportivo	12	1	3	8	11	30	−19	5	

Source: RSSSF

== Torneo Finalización ==
Pos	Team	Pld	W	D	L	GF	GA	GD	Pts	Bonus
1	Junior	28	16	8	4	54	28	+26	40	+1.00 points
2	Deportes Quindío	28	16	6	6	36	23	+13	38	+0.75 points
3	América de Cali	28	15	8	5	49	28	+21	38	+0.50 points
4	Atlético Nacional	28	12	11	5	45	29	+16	35	+0.25 points
5	Millonarios	28	11	11	6	38	30	+8	33	
6	Independiente Medellín	28	11	10	7	40	31	+9	32	
7	Santa Fe	28	13	5	10	43	42	+1	31	
8	Atlético Bucaramanga	28	12	6	10	38	34	+4	30	
9	Unión Magdalena	28	11	8	9	39	36	+3	30	
10	Once Caldas	28	9	10	9	41	40	+1	28	
11	Deportivo Cali	28	8	8	12	27	31	−4	24	
12	Cúcuta Deportivo	28	5	11	12	34	44	−10	21	
13	Deportes Tolima	28	5	6	17	16	46	−30	16	
14	Sporting	28	4	4	20	25	57	−32	12	
15	Deportivo Pereira	28	3	6	19	18	44	−26	12	

Source: RSSSF

== Aggregate table ==
An aggregate table known as Reclasificación including the games of both tournaments (Apertura and Finalización) was used to determine the teams that would advance to the Copa Mustang final stages.

Pos	Team	Pld	W	D	L	GF	GA	GD	Pts	Qualification or relegation
1	Junior	40	21	12	7	71	43	+28	54	Advance to the Final stages
2	Deportes Quindío	40	22	7	11	53	38	+15	51	Advance to the Final stages
3	América de Cali	40	18	13	9	64	44	+20	49	Advance to the Final stages
4	Millonarios	40	17	15	8	63	43	+20	49	Advance to the Final stages
5	Atlético Nacional	40	17	14	9	59	40	+19	48	Advance to the Final stages
6	Santa Fe	40	19	8	13	63	53	+10	46	Advance to the Final stages
7	Independiente Medellín	40	16	14	10	54	41	+13	46	Advance to the Final stages
8	Atlético Bucaramanga	40	17	11	12	58	47	+11	45	Advance to the Final stages
9	Unión Magdalena	40	15	12	13	51	47	+4	42	
10	Once Caldas	40	13	13	14	56	62	−6	39	
11	Deportivo Cali	40	12	13	15	41	42	−1	37	
12	Cúcuta Deportivo	40	6	14	20	45	74	−29	26	
13	Sporting	40	8	8	24	42	71	−29	24	
14	Deportes Tolima	40	7	8	25	25	72	−47	22	
15	Deportivo Pereira	40	6	10	24	28	56	−28	22	

Source: RSSSF

== Final stages ==
=== Semifinal quadrangulars ===
==== Group A ====
Pos	Team	Pld	W	D	L	GF	GA	GD	Pts	Qualification
1	Atlético Nacional	6	3	2	1	12	8	+4	8.25 (Note: Season bonus: 0.25 points)	Advance to Final quadrangular
2	Junior	6	3	1	2	12	10	+2	8 (Note: Season bonus: 1.00 points)	Advance to Final quadrangular
3	Millonarios	6	2	2	2	9	11	−2	7	
4	Independiente Medellín	6	1	1	4	6	10	−4	3.25	

Source: RSSSF

==== Group B ====
Pos	Team	Pld	W	D	L	GF	GA	GD	Pts	Qualification
1	América de Cali	6	4	0	2	10	8	+2	8.5 (Note: Season bonus: 0.50 points)	Advance to Final quadrangular
2	Santa Fe	6	3	1	2	9	8	+1	7.75 (Note: Season bonus: 0.75 points)	Advance to Final quadrangular
3	Deportes Quindío	6	2	1	3	9	10	−1	5.75	
4	Atlético Bucaramanga	6	1	2	3	6	8	−2	4.5	

Source: RSSSF

=== Final quadrangular ===
Pos	Team	Pld	W	D	L	GF	GA	GD	Pts	Qualification
1	Atlético Nacional (C)	6	4	2	0	8	3	+5	10.25 (Note: Season bonus: 0.25 points)	Qualification for Copa Libertadores
2	América de Cali	6	3	1	2	12	7	+5	7.5 (Note: Season bonus: 0.50 points)	Qualification for Copa Libertadores
3	Junior	6	2	1	3	10	9	+1	6 (Note: Season bonus: 1.00 points)	Qualification for Copa CONMEBOL
4	Santa Fe	6	1	0	5	4	15	−11	2.75 (Note: Season bonus: 0.75 points)	

Source: RSSSF
(C) Champions

== Top goalscorers ==
Rank	Player	Club	Goals
1	(Colombia) Iván Valenciano	Junior	30
2	(Uruguay) Jorge da Silva	América de Cali	20
3	(Colombia) José Manuel Rodríguez	Deportivo Cali	18
4	(Colombia) Orlando Maturana	América de Cali	17
4	(Colombia) Adolfo Valencia	Santa Fe	17
6	(Colombia) Faustino Asprilla	Atlético Nacional	16
7	(Colombia) Víctor Aristizábal	Atlético Nacional	15
7	(Colombia) Alfonso Cañón Jr.	Santa Fe	15
7	(Paraguay) Jorge Daniel Jara	Independiente Medellín	15
10	(Colombia) Jesús Barrios	Atlético Bucaramanga	14

Source: Historia del Fútbol Profesional Colombiano 70 Años
