= 1987 Campeonato Ecuatoriano de Fútbol Serie A =

Campeonato Ecuatoriano de Fútbol
- Season: 1987
- Champions: Barcelona
- Relegated: 9 de Octubre
- Copa Libertadores: Barcelona; Filanbanco
- Matches: 378
- Goals: 969 (2.56 per match)

The 1987 Campeonato Ecuatoriano de Fútbol de la Serie A was the 29th national championship for football teams in Ecuador.

== Teams ==
The number of teams for this season was played by 18 teams.

Club	City
América de Quito	Quito
Aucas	Quito
Audaz Octubrino	Machala
Barcelona	Guayaquil
Deportivo Cotopaxi	Cotopaxi
Deportivo Cuenca	Cuenca
Deportivo Quevedo	Quevedo
Deportivo Quito	Quito
El Nacional	Quito
Emelec	Guayaquil
Esmeraldas Petrolero	Esmeraldas
Filanbanco	Guayaquil
LDU Portoviejo	Portoviejo
LDU Quito	Quito
Macará	Ambato
River Plate de Riobamba	Chimborazo
Técnico Universitario	Ambato
Universidad Católica	Quito

== First stage ==
Pos	Team	Pld	W	D	L	GF	GA	GD	Pts	Qualification or relegation
1	Barcelona	34	21	5	8	50	25	+25	47	Qualification to the Second stage
2	El Nacional	34	19	6	9	67	41	+26	44	Qualification to the Second stage
3	LDU Quito	34	14	15	5	49	29	+20	43	Qualification to the Second stage
4	Deportivo Cuenca	34	16	11	7	39	21	+18	43	Qualification to the Second stage
5	Filanbanco	34	17	8	9	57	37	+20	42	Qualification to the Second stage
6	Deportivo Quito	34	13	11	10	53	38	+15	37	Qualification to the Second stage
7	Aucas	34	13	11	10	48	42	+6	37	Qualification to the Second stage
8	Audaz Octubrino	34	14	9	11	37	39	−2	37	Qualification to the Second stage
9	LDU Portoviejo	34	14	8	12	51	41	+10	36	Qualification to the Second stage
10	Emelec	34	14	6	14	43	37	+6	34	Qualification to the Second stage
11	Técnico Universitario	34	11	12	11	42	40	+2	34	Qualification to the Second stage
12	Macará	34	12	10	12	49	53	−4	34	Qualification to the Second stage
13	América de Quito	34	9	12	13	32	39	−7	30	
14	Deportivo Quevedo	34	11	6	17	39	66	−27	28	
15	Universidad Católica	34	8	9	17	31	47	−16	25	
16	Esmeraldas Petrolero	34	8	9	17	35	57	−22	25	
17	River Plate de Riobamba	34	6	12	16	33	50	−17	24	
18	Deportivo Cotopaxi	34	3	6	25	26	78	−52	12	Relegated to the Serie B

Source: RSSSF - 1987 Serie A

== Second stage ==
=== Group A ===
Pos	Team	Pld	W	D	L	GF	GA	GD	Pts	Qualification or relegation
1	Barcelona (Note: Barcelonawere awarded 1 point.)	10	4	4	2	14	12	+2	13	Qualified to the Cuadrangular Final
2	Filanbanco	10	5	3	2	21	7	+14	13	Qualified to the Cuadrangular Final
3	LDU Quito	10	4	2	4	19	19	0	10	
4	Aucas	10	4	2	4	13	14	−1	10	
5	LDU Portoviejo	10	3	4	3	14	16	−2	10	
6	Técnico Universitario	10	1	3	6	10	23	−13	5	

Source: RSSSF - 1987 Serie A

=== Group B ===
Pos	Team	Pld	W	D	L	GF	GA	GD	Pts	Qualification or relegation
1	Deportivo Quito (Note: Deportivo Quito were awarded 1 point.)	10	5	4	1	17	10	+7	15	Qualified to the Cuadrangular Final
2	Audaz Octubrino	10	4	4	2	11	12	−1	12	Qualified to the Cuadrangular Final
3	Macará	10	4	3	3	13	13	0	11	
4	Emelec	10	4	2	4	17	13	+4	10	
5	El Nacional	10	3	3	4	14	15	−1	9	
6	Deportivo Cuenca	10	0	4	6	4	13	−9	4	

Source: RSSSF - 1987 Serie A

== Cuadrangular Final ==
Pos	Team	Pld	W	D	L	GF	GA	GD	Pts	Qualification
1	Barcelona (Note: Barcelona were awarded one point.) (C)	6	3	2	1	5	2	+3	9	1988 Copa Libertadores
2	Filanbanco	6	2	4	0	6	2	+4	8	1988 Copa Libertadores
3	Audaz Octubrino	6	2	1	3	6	9	−3	5	
4	Deportivo Quito (Note: Deportivo Quito were awarded one point.)	6	1	1	4	5	9	−4	4	

Source: RSSSF - 1987 Serie A
(C) Champions
Notes:

Campeonato Ecuatoriano de Fútbol
1987 champion
