= 1989 Campeonato Ecuatoriano de Fútbol Serie A =

Campeonato Ecuatoriano de Fútbol
- Season: 1989
- Champions: Barcelona
- Relegated: Audaz Octubrino; LDU Portoviejo
- Copa Libertadores: Barcelona; Emelec
- Matches: 234
- Goals: 594 (2.54 per match)

The 1989 Campeonato Ecuatoriano de Fútbol de la Serie A was the 31st national championship for football teams in Ecuador.

== Teams ==
The number of teams for this season was played by 12 teams.

(In First Stage)

Club	City
Aucas	Quito
Audaz Octubrino	Machala
Barcelona	Guayaquil
Deportivo Cuenca	Cuenca
Deportivo Quito	Quito
El Nacional	Quito
Emelec	Guayaquil
Filanbanco	Guayaquil
LDU Portoviejo	Portoviejo
LDU Quito	Quito
Macará	Ambato
Técnico Universitario	Ambato

(In Second Stage)

Club	City
Aucas	Quito
Barcelona	Guayaquil
Delfín	Manta
Deportivo Cuenca	Cuenca
Deportivo Quito	Quito
El Nacional	Quito
Emelec	Guayaquil
Filanbanco	Guayaquil
LDU Portoviejo	Portoviejo
LDU Quito	Quito
Macará	Ambato
Técnico Universitario	Ambato

== First stage ==
Pos	Team	Pld	W	D	L	GF	GA	GD	Pts	Qualification or relegation
1	El Nacional	22	14	2	6	40	25	+15	30	Qualification to the Hexagonal Final and Second stage
2	Barcelona	22	9	10	3	30	15	+15	28	Qualification to the Hexagonal Final and Second stage
3	Emelec	22	9	8	5	27	22	+5	26	Qualification to the Hexagonal Final and Second stage
4	Deportivo Quito	22	10	5	7	26	16	+10	25	Qualification to the Hexagonal Final and Second stage
5	Macará	22	8	8	6	24	23	+1	24	Qualification to the Second stage
6	LDU Quito	22	7	7	8	32	27	+5	21	Qualification to the Second stage
7	Aucas (Note: SD Aucas were deducted two points.)	22	8	7	7	22	31	−9	21	Qualification to the Second stage
8	Filanbanco	22	7	5	10	31	33	−2	19	Qualification to the Relegation Liguilla and Second Stage
9	Deportivo Cuenca	22	6	7	9	24	31	−7	19	Qualification to the Relegation Liguilla and Second Stage
10	LDU Portoviejo	22	6	6	10	19	31	−12	18	Qualification to the Relegation Liguilla and Second Stage
11	Técnico Universitario	22	5	7	10	22	29	−7	17	Qualification to the Relegation Liguilla and Second Stage
12	Audaz Octubrino	22	3	8	11	25	36	−11	14	Relegated to the Serie B

Source: RSSSF - 1989 Serie A

== Second stage ==
=== Group A ===
Pos	Team	Pld	W	D	L	GF	GA	GD	Pts	Qualification or relegation
1	Macará	10	4	3	3	19	13	+6	11	Qualified to the Hexagonal Final
2	Aucas	10	4	3	3	17	15	+2	11	
3	Delfín	10	5	1	4	12	14	−2	11	
4	El Nacional	10	3	4	3	12	9	+3	10	
5	Emelec	10	4	1	5	12	15	−3	9	
6	Deportivo Cuenca	10	4	0	6	11	17	−6	8	

Source: RSSSF - 1989 Serie A

=== Group B ===
Pos	Team	Pld	W	D	L	GF	GA	GD	Pts	Qualification or relegation
1	Filanbanco	10	6	1	3	21	14	+7	13	Qualified to the Hexagonal final
2	LDU Quito	10	4	4	2	10	8	+2	12	
3	Deportivo Quito	10	4	3	3	20	8	+12	11	
4	Barcelona	10	3	4	3	9	11	−2	10	
5	Técnico Universitario	10	1	6	3	8	14	−6	8	
6	LDU Portoviejo	10	1	4	5	8	21	−13	6	

Source: RSSSF - 1989 Serie A

== Relegation Liguilla ==
Pos	Team	Pld	W	D	L	GF	GA	GD	Pts	Qualification or relegation
1	Aucas	6	4	1	1	12	6	+6	9	
2	Técnico Universitario (Note: Tecnico Universitario were deducted -0.5 points.)	6	2	2	2	9	8	+1	5.5	
3	Deportivo Cuenca	6	2	0	4	7	7	0	4	
4	LDU Portoviejo (Note: LDU Portoviejo were deducted -1 points.)	6	2	1	3	5	12	−7	4	Relegated to the Serie B

Source: RSSSF - 1989 Serie A

== Hexagonal Final ==
Pos	Team	Pld	W	D	L	GF	GA	GD	Pts	Qualification or relegation
1	Barcelona	10	5	3	2	15	9	+6	14 (Note: Includes bonus points earned in the previous stage: Barcelona and Deportivo Quito one point each.)	1990 Copa Libertadores
2	Emelec	10	6	1	3	22	15	+7	13.5 (Note: Includes bonus points earned in the previous stage: Emelec, Filanbanco, Macará and Deportivo Quito 0.5 points each.)	1990 Copa Libertadores
3	Deportivo Quito	10	5	2	3	12	10	+2	12.5	
4	El Nacional	10	3	3	4	17	18	−1	10	
5	Macará	10	2	3	5	10	18	−8	7.5	
6	Filanbanco	10	1	4	5	12	18	−6	6.5	

Source: RSSSF - 1989 Serie A
