= Héctor Morales =

Héctor Morales may refer to:

- Héctor Morales (footballer, born 1985), Mexican footballer for Cafetaleros de Tapachula
- Héctor Morales (footballer, born 1993), Cuban footballer
- Héctor Gabriel Morales (born 1989), Argentinian footballer for Ferencvárosi TC
- Héctor Morales (actor) (born 1982), Chilean actor starring in Tony Manero, Martín Rivas or Chipe Libre
- Hector Morales (diplomat) (born 1954), United States Ambassador to the Organization of American States from 2007 to 2009
