= Barcelona S.C. =

Ecuadorian sports club based in Guayaquil

Barcelona SC
- Full name: Barcelona Sporting Club
- Nicknames: Ídolo del Ecuador (Ecuador's Idol); Ídolo del Astillero (Shipyard's Idol); Toreros (Bullfighters)
- Founded: 1925
- Ground: Estadio Monumental Banco Pichincha
- Capacity: 59,283
- President: Antonio Álvarez Henriques
- Manager: Pablo Trobbiani
- League: Ecuadorian Serie A
- 2025: First stage: 2nd of 16; First hexagonal: 3rd of 6
- Website: barcelonasc.com.ec
Home colours	Away colours	Third colours

Barcelona Sporting Club (Spanish: [baɾseˈlona]), internationally known as Barcelona de Guayaquil, is an Ecuadorian sports club based in Guayaquil, known best for its professional football team. They currently compete in the Ecuadorian Serie A, the top division of football in the country, and have never been relegated to the Serie B.

Barcelona Sporting Club is one of the most popular football teams in Ecuador, having won the Serie A title a record 16 times, most recently in 2020. They have also won six regional titles (five in the professional era), and were the first Ecuadorian club to make it to the Copa Libertadores finals, making it twice, but lost on both occasions.

Barcelona Sporting Club was founded on 1 May 1925, by Eutimio Pérez, a Spanish immigrant who named the club after his home city of Barcelona. Since then, Barcelona Sporting Club has become the most popular club in the country. The club holds a long-standing rivalry with Emelec, where matches between the two teams are considered the most important derby in Ecuador, commonly referred to as "El Clásico del Astillero". The club plays their home matches in Estadio Monumental Banco Pichincha, the largest stadium in the country.

In addition to football, the club has teams in professional basketball, bowling, boxing, swimming, volleyball, baseball, athletics, and tennis. In 2008, its basketball team was the champion in the Ecuadorian National Basketball League.

== History ==
=== Foundation and early years (1925–1969) ===

Barcelona Sporting Club's 1st squad of 15 June 1925. The coach was Eutimio Pérez.

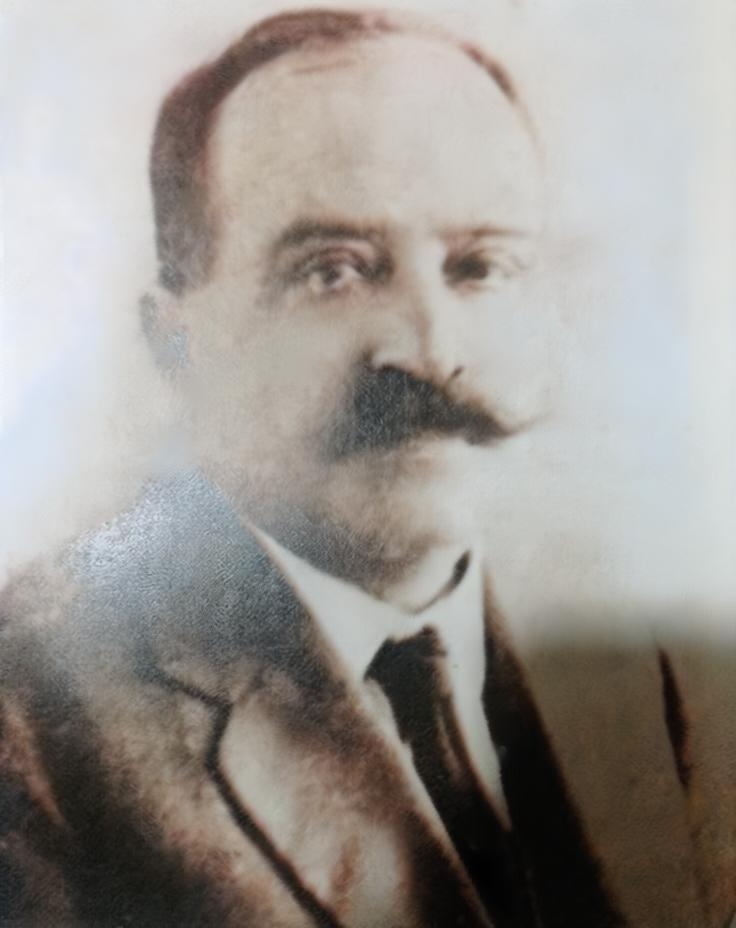
Don Eutimio Pérez Arumi, patron at the birth of Barcelona S.C.

Barcelona Sporting Club was founded on 1 May 1925 by Eutimio Pérez, a Spanish immigrant who decided to name the club after his home city of Barcelona, Spain. The team was named after Pérez's return to Ecuador, and BSC's Barça-like crest was adopted later on. The team competed in the provincial amateur tournament organized by Asociación de Fútbol del Guayas (AFG), which included clubs from around the Guayas Province in Ecuador. In the 1940s, Barcelona's popularity grew partly by its notoriety in playing matches against important Colombian teams, such as Deportivo Cali and Millionarios, two of the best teams from Colombia's golden era of football. Barcelona defeated Millionarios twice in Guayaquil, by scores of 3–2 and 1–0.

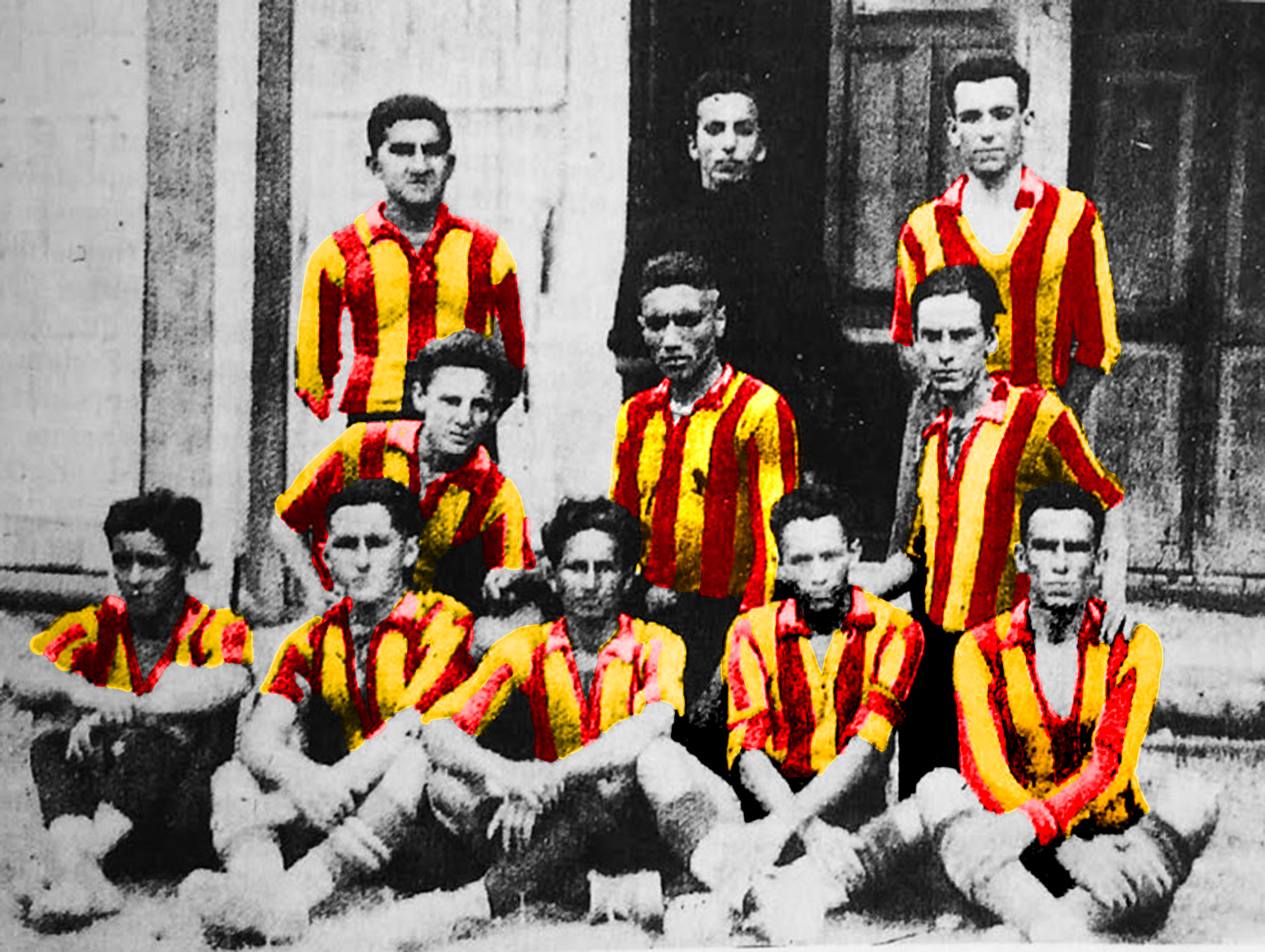
Barcelona Sporting Club in 1926.

Barcelona was formed in the same place where the club which would become its most intense sporting rival was founded, Club Sport Emelec. Both clubs were born in the same Guayaquil neighborhood, Astillero de Guayaquil.

In 1950, Barcelona Sporting Club won its first AFG amateur title; the following year, the Association turned professional, and between 1951 and 1967, Barcelona racked up five professional regional titles and finished as runners-up six times, tying crosstown rival Emelec for the most titles. In 1957, as one of the top two finishers in the Guayas regional tournament, Barcelona was invited to participate in the newly organized Serie A de Ecuador, which would crown a national championship from among the top two teams from both the AFG and the Interandino tournament disputed by teams from Quito and Ambato. Barcelona of Guayaquil finished second in their first participation. Barcelona won its first national title in 1960, and became the first Ecuadorian team to compete in the Copa Libertadores.

- First match: 15 June 1925 vs Ayacucho (1–0)
- First international match: 19 March 1931 vs (Colombia) Deportivo Cali (4–4)

=== Success, then fall from grace (1970s) ===
By the 1970s, Barcelona had established themselves as one of Ecuador's more popular teams after winning a number of provincial and national championships. Despite their national success, their performance in the Copa Libertadores had been lackluster, having exited the tournament early in competition. That changed in 1971, when they reached the semi-finals of the tournament with a star-studded squad that featured players such as Brazilian international Jose Paes, Peruvian World Cup player Pedro Pablo León, and Ecuadorian legend Alberto Spencer. Although they failed to reach the finals, at that time Estudiantes de La Plata was undefeated 4 years in row in home matches in Copa Libertadores, they managed to defeat three-time tournament winner Estudiantes de La Plata 1–0 in La Plata, later it would be recognized as La Hazaña de la Plata. In 1972, they reached the semi-finals again, establishing themselves in the international stage.

The first two years of the decade were in stark contrast to the remainder; after the 1972 season, the club entered a dry spell that would last nine years. Barcelona did not win a national title, nor did it qualify for the Copa Libertadores, until the 1980s.

=== Resurgence (1980s) ===
In the 1980s, Barcelona shed the shackles of the prior decade and resurged on the international and domestic fronts. In 1980, the team won their first national title since 1971, going on to win four more before the end of the decade, making the 1980s the team's most successful period in terms of national titles; Barcelona became the first Ecuadorian squad to win 10 national championships. During this period, Barcelona competed in six editions of the Copa Libertadores, reaching the semi-finals twice in 1986 and 1987. In 1988, the club hosted a historic meeting against FC Barcelona from Spain, homonym to the Ecuadorian club, during the Guayaquil City Cup friendly; the Ecuadorian Barcelona emerged victoriously 2–1.

In 1987, Barcelona inaugurated a new home ground, the Estadio Monumental. With an opening capacity of almost 90,000 spectators, the Monumental is still the largest stadium in Ecuador, and was the second-largest in South America, after the Estádio do Maracanã in Rio de Janeiro. The capacity has been reduced to just under 60,000 due to safety concerns like most South American stadiums.

=== The glory years (1990s) ===
In 1990, under a new president, the club acquired key international players: former Argentine international and World Cup champion in 1986 Marcelo Trobbiani, Argentine international Alberto Acosta, and Uruguayan Marcelo Saralegui.

In 1990 Copa Libertadores edition, a dramatic semi-final home and away series, Barcelona beat River Plate of Argentina in a penalty shoot-out, to finally reach the long-awaited final. Unfortunately they would come short, losing against Olimpia of (Paraguay) 2–0 in the away game, and tying 1–1 in the home game. Many considered the referee had affected the outcome in favor of the Paraguayan team.

In 1992, they put together another great team, beating the previous champions Colo-Colo (Chile) and reaching the Libertadores Cup semi-finals once again, but losing against the powerful Brazilian team of São Paulo, who at the time was coached by Tele Santana. Among their stars, São Paulo had players such as Zetti, Cafu, Raí, Müller and Palhinha.

This decade also proved to show a negative side in the team's history. On 26 December 1993, three days after Barcelona had achieved the second place in the Ecuadorian league and earning a spot in the next Libertadores cup, Ecuadorian striker Carlos Muñoz died in a car accident at the age of 26.

After winning the Ecuadorian league title in 1997 (their last until 2012) with the help of such players as former Bolivian international Marco "El Diablo" Etcheverry, former Colombian international Anthony "El Pipa" De Avila and former Ecuadorian international Agustin "Tin" Delgado, they would go on to play the 1998 Libertadores Cup with mostly old players that seemed to be on their way out. But against all odds, they would reach their second Libertadores Cup final, losing both championship games against Brazilian team Vasco Da Gama, 2–0 in the away game and 2–1 in the home game.

1998 was their last appearance in the Copa Libertadores final as of 2022, ultimately meaning that their intention of capturing the Copa Libertadores that they wanted since the turn of the decade turned out to be a missed opportunity and was disappointing to many fans as they expected to win at least one continental title. The glory of being the first Ecuadorian team instead went to bitter rivals L.D.U. Quito who won the 2008 Copa Libertadores and leaving Barcelona further stings of what could have been.

=== Title drought (1998–2012) ===
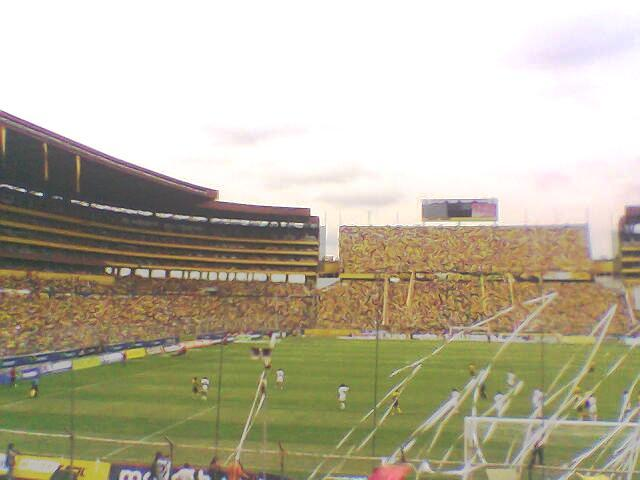
Barcelona's stadium during a match in 2006.

Barcelona did not win a national title for 15 years since 1997, and participated in only two editions of the Copa Libertadores in the 2000s (decade). Despite the lack of titles in recent years, the club remains among the most successful teams in the league, having managed three Serie A runners-up finishes in the decade. Barcelona continues to be among the top contributors to the Ecuador national team, and remains one of the most popular teams in Ecuador. The derby with crosstown team Emelec, remains the most popular football rivalry in Ecuador.

During November 2007, Eduardo Maruri was elected President of Barcelona for the 2007–11 period. Maruri and Noboa (Barcelona's Vice President) introduced the slogan La Renovación (The Renovation), thereby promising to bring in key international players as well as the best Ecuadorian players and to clean up the mess that had prevented Barcelona from winning the national title. However, the 2009 season was Barcelona's worst season in its history in the Serie A. Such teams as Deportivo Quito, ESPOLI, Deportivo Cuenca and LDU Portoviejo came out and spoke about their concern: if Barcelona were relegated, it would enormously impact those teams' economic situations, since when they would play at home against Barcelona it would almost guarantee a sell-out. (This was because Barcelona had the most fans of any team in Ecuador.) On 3 October 2009, more than 70,000 fans showed up at the Estadio Monumental Banco del Pichincha to support El Idolo del Ecuador so that it would not be relegated to the Serie B. In an intense match, Barcelona defeated LDU Portoviejo 2–0 with goals from José Luis Perlaza (46th minute) and Juan Samudio (90th minute). This allowed Barcelona to remain the only Ecuadorian team that has never played a game in Serie B.

On 5 November 2009, Barcelona's President, Eduardo Maruri, announced the hiring of a multimedia communications group from Spain, MediaPro, to help them as a consultant and guide them through the new decade in the aspects of advertisement, finance, and sport. This was done with the hope of bringing Barcelona back to international prominence and giving the fans what they most desired, the elusive 14th domestic title.

However, Eduardo Maruri resigned the presidency of Barcelona during a surprise press conference on 22 December 2010, stating that he was doing so because of "family issues". Maruri was resigning one year before the scheduled completion of his term. After Maruri resigned, Juan Carlos Estrada was designated as the new President of Barcelona. Estrada also resigned the next day and Alfonso Harb Viteri assumed the presidency. Harb stated that he was going to step down as President and announced that Barcelona's presidential elections would be held on 11 June of the following year.

=== Noboa Era (2011–2015) ===
The businessman Antonio Noboa with his slogan Primero Barcelona, defeated his opponent Jose Herrera and was sworn as the new president of Barcelona SC on 11 June 2011.

During the Noboa era, Barcelona managed to win the 2012 Serie A, ending a 14-year title drought.

=== Cevallos Era (2015–) ===
Former goalkeeper José Francisco Cevallos assume the presidency of Barcelona on 13 December 2015 against Universidad Católica in Barcelona's home stadium, "El Monumental". His term ended in 2020, but was renewed.

In his tenure, Barcelona won the 2016 Ecuadorian Serie A, qualifying them for the 2017 Copa Libertadores, which they reached the semi-finals for the first time since 1998. This run was a great one, qualifying 2nd in their group after River Plate and alongside Independiente Medellín, and Melgar. In the knockouts, they beat Brazilian Sides Palmeiras in the round of 16 and Botafogo in the Quarterfinals, before losing to eventual champion Grêmio in the Semifinals. His term ended with a gleeful 2020 Ecuadorian Serie A Championship, and then was re-elected Club President. The next year, Barcelona reached the semifinals of the 2021 Copa Libertadores. This run saw Barcelona top a very tough group with 7 time winners Boca Juniors, the previous year's runner-up Santos, and one of the best Bolivian clubs in The Strongest. In the knockouts, they beat Vélez Sarsfield in the round of 16 and Fluminense in the quarter-finals before falling to finalists Flamengo in the semi-finals. In the 2022 Ecuadorian Serie A, despite winning the first phase, they fell short of the Championship to first time winners Aucas.

== Colours and badge ==
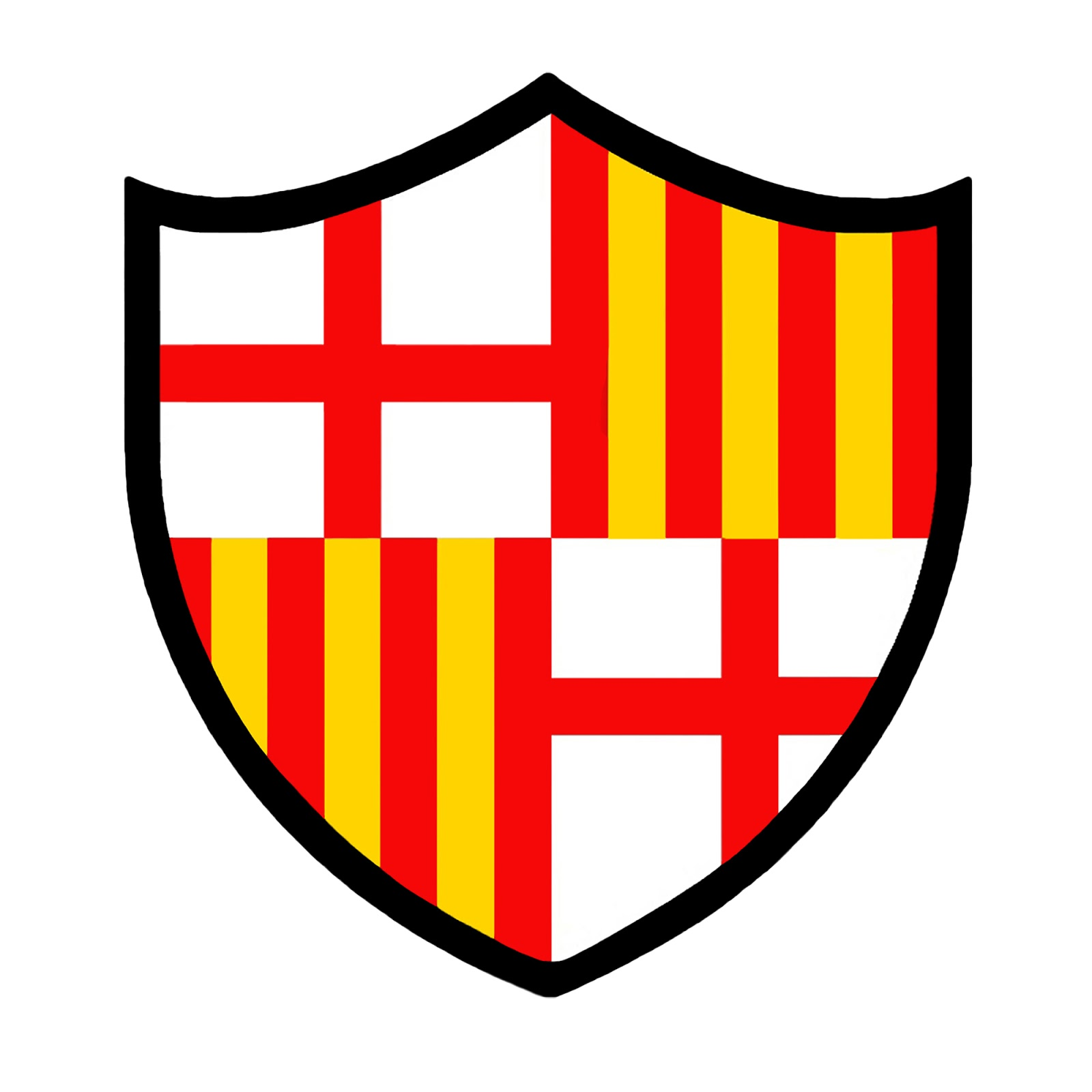
Barcelona's original crest.

The crest of Barcelona has changed over the years. The teams' first crest consisted of a modified version of the city of Barcelona's Coat of Arms in dark blue borders. The team used this crest for two years until 1927. In 1935, the first major change came when they used Barcelona's flag in a circle, with a triangle behind it bearing the team's initials. In 1955, after the team won their first Guayas Championship, the team adopted their current crest, which is similar to FC Barcelona's. Changes they made to it included the number of spikes, the colour of the ball, border colour, and the initials.

=== Uniform evolution ===
1925–26	1926–42	1942–46	1947–present

The team's traditional colors are yellow and red, with the home kit being all yellow since moorlands era 2015

Prior to that, the teams used to play in black and white kits. For a period early in their history, the team used a kit similar to FC Barcelona's, but after a series of losses in that uniform, the team president swore never to wear those colors again. In the 1940s, yellow was introduced, and would eventually become the team's primary color, replacing white altogether; red would become the secondary color, used in their alternate kit.

== Stadium ==
Barcelona has played in three stadiums. Their first stadium was Estadio George Capwell, with whom they shared with crosstown rival Emelec as it was the only stadium in Guayaquil.

In 1959, they moved to the Guayaquil's brand new stadium Estadio Modelo. This was the stadium in which the teams played in during the golden years. For several years Barcelona shared this stadium with Emelec and Patria.

After Estadio Modelo's success, the president of Barcelona, Isidro Romero Carbo, initiated the project to give Barcelona their own stadium. Romero talked with Jaime Nebot, Guayaquil's mayor, and León Febres Cordero, then President of Ecuador (both of whom are Barcelona fans) about the idea; they decided to help. Nebot donated a huge ground, for construction and Febres Cordero helped him with money. In 1986, Romero put up the first block of the stadium in 1986. In 1987, Estadio Monumental opened for the first time. The stadium was the first in Ecuador to have suites, and became the largest in terms of capacity, with space for close to 90,000 fans.

Recently the team signed a ten-year deal with Latin America Futbol Corporation to install a state of the art LED perimeter board in the Estadio Monumental Banco Pichincha. The 243-meter LED perimeter board was installed in September 2008 and is the first LED perimeter board in an Ecuadorian football stadium. The deal is a 50–50 partnership between the two groups. On 12 July 2015 a Giant LED perimeter board was debuted in the Estadio Monumental Banco Pichincha, the biggest in South America, which is located in the north sector in parish Tarqui of Guayaquil. An aerial lift or cable car currently under construction will connect the stadium with the "Aerovia" Julian Coronel station in downtown Guayaquil, which service is scheduled to start in the second half of August 2026

== Supporters ==
Barcelona SC has the largest fanbase of any club in Ecuador. According to CONMEBOL, it is considered the most popular sports club in Ecuador with more than 7 million fans as of April 2016. When Barcelona SC plays away, many of their followers from the city of the home team show up to the stadium to root for Barcelona.

Barcelona's ultras are known as La Sur Oscura (English: The Dark south). During home matches, they are located in the southern end of the Estadio Monumental. In Quito, Barcelona's ultras are known as Sur Oscura Quito (English: Dark South Quito). Another group of Barcelona's ultras are known as Zona Norte (English: North Zone).

=== Rivalries ===
El Clásico del Astillero is a match played against Barcelona's old rival Emelec. It was not until 22 August 1943 that the two sides faced each other for the first time, in a Guayaquil League match. Sporting their distinctive yellow jerseys, Los Canarios defeated El Eléctrico 4–3, with Pedro Villalta scoring a late winner for Barcelona. It was a match that would forever be remembered as The Derby of the Posts due to the number of times that the Emelec forwards struck the woodwork.

In 1948, the local derby received a name of its own in a preview in the newspaper El Universo, becoming known forever more as El Clásico del Astillero (The Shipyard Derby).

In 1990, proved to be a very special year in the history of El Clásico del Astillero, with the two sides facing off in a Copa Libertadores quarter-final second leg on 29 August. Barcelona de Guayaquil advanced to the semi-finals after a 1–0 win.

The rivalries between these two teams is immense in Ecuador and international that it caught the eye of international filmmaker Filmadora Panamericana and in 1973 a movie was made titled "El derecho de los pobres", starting Spanish-Mexican actor Enrique Rambal, Mexican actor Enrique Rocha and Ecuadorian football player Alberto Spencer, proclaimed the best Ecuadorian football player of all times, makes his cinema debut.

On social media, the rivalry between the two teams comes up more frequently. The fans take advantage of any slip of the opposite team to create memes and videos to laugh down, especially the day after a game. The most used phrase to highlight the existing rivalry is "Barcelona, tu papá." (English: "Barcelona is your father"), referring to the fact that Barcelona has always occupied a most important hierarchical position than Emelec in many aspects.

This rivalry has gained special significance with the recent success of both teams in Serie A play, with Barcelona winning in 2012, and Emelec winning in 2013 and 2014. The 2014 championship was decided by a 3–0 Emelec win over Barcelona.

== Honours ==
=== National ===
- Serie A
  - Winners (16): 1960, 1963, 1966, 1970, 1971, 1980, 1981, 1985, 1987, 1989, 1991, 1995, 1997, 2012, 2016, 2020

=== International ===
- Copa Libertadores
  - Runners-up (2): 1990, 1998

=== Regional ===
- Campeonato Amateur de Guayaquil
  - Winners (1): 1950
- Campeonato Amateur División Intermedia
  - Winners (1): 1941
- Campeonato Amateur Serie B
  - Winners (2): 1940, 1946
- Campeonato Amateur Serie C
  - Winners (3): 1934, 1936, 1938
- Campeonato de Fútbol del Guayas
  - Winners (5): 1955, 1961, 1963, 1965, 1967
- Copa de Reservas AsoGuayas
  - Winners (1): 2006
- Copa Fedeguayas
  - Winners (1): 2004

== Players ==
=== Current squad ===
As of 26 September 2026

Note: Flags indicate national team as defined under FIFA eligibility rules; some limited exceptions apply. Players may hold more than one non-FIFA nationality.

No.	Pos.	Nation	Player
1	GK	VEN	José Contreras
4	DF	ECU	Gustavo Vallecilla
6	DF	ECU	Aníbal Chalá
7	FW	ECU	Erick Mendoza
8	FW	PAR	Sergio Díaz
9	FW	ARG	Darío Benedetto
10	MF	ECU	Damián Díaz (captain)
11	FW	PAN	Tomás Rodríguez
13	GK	ECU	José Luis Angulo
14	DF	ECU	Alex Rangel
15	DF	ECU	Jonathan Perlaza
16	FW	ECU	Luis Cano
18	DF	ECU	Bryan Carabalí
21	FW	PAR	Héctor Villalba
22	GK	ECU	José Gabriel Cevallos
23	MF	ARG	Tomás Martínez

No.	Pos.	Nation	Player
25	FW	ECU	Ronald Perlaza
26	DF	ECU	Byron Castillo
27	DF	ECU	Willian Vargas
28	MF	ECU	Jhonny Quiñónez (on loan from Independiente)
29	MF	ECU	Jordan Medina
32	MF	ARG	Matías Lugo (on loan from Argentinos Juniors)
33	DF	PAR	Javier Báez
35	MF	ECU	Jefferson Intriago
44	DF	ECU	Jhonnier Chalá
50	MF	ECU	Johan García
51	FW	ECU	Jefferson Wila
63	FW	ECU	Klever Caicedo
70	FW	ECU	Marcos Mejía
77	FW	ECU	Yordi Vernaza
93	FW	ECU	Eduardo Esterilla

=== Reserve squad ===
Note: Flags indicate national team as defined under FIFA eligibility rules; some limited exceptions apply. Players may hold more than one non-FIFA nationality.

No.	Pos.	Nation	Player
6	DF	ECU	Brian Quintero
17	FW	ECU	Dixon Gaspar
20	DF	ECU	Carlos Medina
24	GK	ECU	Kevin Angulo
41	MF	ECU	Pablo Calle
45	FW	ECU	Pedro Preciado

No.	Pos.	Nation	Player
54	DF	ECU	Neyder Castañeda
55	FW	ECU	Jeremi Santillán
58	DF	ECU	Gregory Garaicoa
61	MF	ECU	Ariel Arroyo
62	MF	ECU	Yeray Muñoz
66	MF	ECU	Abdala Bucaram

=== Out on loan ===
Note: Flags indicate national team as defined under FIFA eligibility rules; some limited exceptions apply. Players may hold more than one non-FIFA nationality.

No. / Pos. / Nation / Player	No. / Pos. / Nation / Player; 25 / FW / ECU / Cristhian Solano (on loan to Leones until 31 December 2026)

=== Retired Numbers ===
Note: Flags indicate national team as defined under FIFA eligibility rules; some limited exceptions apply. Players may hold more than one non-FIFA nationality.

No.	Pos.	Nation	Player
2	DF	ECU	Mario Pineida (2016-2025)

== World Cup players ==
The following players were chosen to represent their country at the FIFA World Cup while contracted to Barcelona SC.

- (Colombia) Antony de Ávila (1998)
- (Ecuador) Nicolás Geovanny Asencio (2002)
- (Ecuador) José Francisco Cevallos (2002)
- (Ecuador) Luis Oswaldo Gómez (2002)
- (Ecuador) Iván Jacinto Hurtado (2002)
- (Ecuador) Iván Kaviedes (2002)
- (Ecuador) Edwin Tenorio (2002, 2006)
- (Ecuador) Máximo Banguera (2014)
- (Ecuador) Juan Carlos Paredes (2014)
- (Ecuador) Luis Saritama (2014)

== Managers ==
=== Current technical staff ===
Position	Staff
Manager	(Venezuela) César Farías
Assistant manager	(Venezuela) Grenddy Perozo (Venezuela) Jesús Farías
Fitness coach	(Venezuela) Isaac Ramos
Goalkeeping coach	(Ecuador) Francisco Vásconez
Video analyst	(Ecuador) Iván Espín
Equipment manager	(Ecuador) José Soriano (Ecuador) Francisco Zapata

Last updated: 29 January 2026
Source: onefootball.com

=== Notable managers ===
List according to each manager that has won a title.

- (Uruguay) Julio Kellman (won the 1960 Serie A title)
- (Brazil) Francisco Ferreira de Sousa "Gradim" (won the 1963 Serie A title)
- (Uruguay) José María Rodríguez (won the 1965 Campeonato del Guayas)
- (Ecuador) Pablo Ansaldo (won the 1966 Serie A title)
- (Brazil) Otto Vieira (won Serie A titles 1970,71 and 80)
- (Ecuador) Hector Morales (won the 1981 Serie A title)
- (Chile) Luis Santibáñez (won the 1985 Serie A title)
- (Uruguay) Roque Gastón Máspoli (won the 1987 Serie A title)
- (Argentina) Miguel Brindisi (won the 1989 Serie A titles)
- (Argentina) Jorge Habegger (won the 1991 Serie A titles)
- (Argentina) Salvador Capitano (won the 1995 Serie A title)
- (Argentina) Ruben Dario Insua (won the 1997 Serie A title)
- (Argentina) Gustavo Costas (won the 2012 Serie A title)
- (Uruguay) Guillermo Almada (won the 2016 Serie A title)
- (Argentina) Fabián Bustos (won the 2020 Serie A title)
