= 1991 Liga de Fútbol Profesional Boliviano =

Bolivian Primera División
- Season: 1991
- Champions: Bolívar
- 1992 Copa Libertadores: Bolívar; San José

The 1991 Bolivian Primera División, the first division of Bolivian football, was played by 14 teams. The champion was Bolívar.

== Torneo Apertura ==
=== First Stage ===
Pos	Team	Pld	W	D	L	GF	GA	GD	Pts	Qualification
1	Oriente Petrolero	12	8	2	2	27	10	+17	18	Second Stage
2	Independiente Petrolero	12	7	3	2	32	16	+16	17	Second Stage
3	Bolívar	12	7	3	2	25	13	+12	17	Second Stage
4	Blooming	12	7	2	3	18	9	+9	16	Second Stage
5	San José	12	5	5	2	18	14	+4	15	Second Stage
6	Orcobol	12	6	3	3	12	11	+1	15	Second Stage
7	The Strongest	12	6	1	5	18	18	0	13	Second Stage
8	Petrolero	12	4	3	5	15	12	+3	11	Second Stage
9	Jorge Wilstermann	12	4	3	5	8	11	−3	11	
10	Destroyers	12	3	4	5	12	21	−9	10	
11	Ciclón	12	3	3	6	11	14	−3	9	
12	Chaco Petrolero	12	2	3	7	10	23	−13	7	
13	Always Ready	12	2	2	8	9	25	−16	6	
14	Real Santa Cruz	12	0	3	9	3	21	−18	3	

=== Second Stage ===
==== Serie A ====
Pos	Team	Pld	W	D	L	GF	GA	GD	Pts	Qualification
1	Bolívar	6	4	1	1	9	3	+6	9	Semifinals
2	San José	6	4	0	2	12	6	+6	8	Semifinals
3	Oriente Petrolero	6	3	1	2	8	6	+2	7	
4	Orcobol	6	0	0	6	1	15	−14	0	

==== Serie B ====
Pos	Team	Pld	W	D	L	GF	GA	GD	Pts	Qualification
1	Blooming	6	3	1	2	12	4	+8	7	Semifinals
2	The Strongest	6	3	0	3	10	11	−1	6	Semifinals
3	Petrolero	6	2	2	2	10	11	−1	6	
4	Independiente Petrolero	6	2	1	3	10	16	−6	5	

=== Semifinals ===
==== First leg ====
Bolívar	3–1	The Strongest

Blooming	1–1	San José

==== Second leg ====
The Strongest	2–2	Bolívar

San José	1–0	Blooming

=== Finals ===
==== First leg ====
Bolívar	1–1	San José

==== Second leg ====
San José	1–1	Bolívar

==== Extra match ====
Bolívar	1–0	San José

== Torneo Clausura ==
=== First Stage ===
Pos	Team	Pld	W	D	L	GF	GA	GD	Pts	Qualification
1	Bolívar	12	8	4	0	28	8	+20	20	Second Stage
2	San José	12	6	4	2	22	14	+8	16	Second Stage
3	Oriente Petrolero	12	5	5	2	21	12	+9	15	Second Stage
4	The Strongest	12	4	6	2	23	16	+7	14	Second Stage
5	Orcobol	12	5	4	3	22	17	+5	14	Second Stage
6	Blooming	12	5	4	3	17	13	+4	14	Second Stage
7	Jorge Wilstermann	12	4	5	3	13	15	−2	13	Second Stage
8	Real Santa Cruz	12	3	6	3	8	8	0	12	Second Stage
9	Petrolero	12	4	3	5	16	14	+2	11	
10	Destroyers	12	3	2	7	17	22	−5	8	
11	Ciclón	12	2	4	6	8	14	−6	8	
12	Independiente Petrolero	12	3	5	4	16	26	−10	7	
13	Chaco Petrolero	12	2	3	7	10	24	−14	7	
14	Always Ready	12	2	1	9	14	32	−18	5	

=== Second Stage ===
==== Serie A ====
Pos	Team	Pld	W	D	L	GF	GA	GD	Pts	Qualification
1	Bolívar	6	5	0	1	17	5	+12	10	Semifinals
2	Oriente Petrolero	6	4	1	1	17	7	+10	9	Semifinals
3	Real Santa Cruz	6	2	1	3	6	11	−5	5	
4	Orcobol	6	0	0	6	4	21	−17	0	

==== Serie B ====
Pos	Team	Pld	W	D	L	GF	GA	GD	Pts	Qualification
1	San José	6	3	2	1	10	8	+2	8	Semifinals
2	The Strongest	6	2	2	2	11	9	+2	6	Semifinals
3	Jorge Wilstermann	6	0	5	1	12	13	−1	5	
4	Blooming	6	2	1	3	8	11	−3	5	

=== Semifinals ===
==== First leg ====
Bolívar	3–1	The Strongest

San José	1–0	Oriente Petrolero

==== Second leg ====
The Strongest	0–2	Bolívar

Oriente Petrolero	2–0	San José

=== Finals ===
==== First leg ====
Bolívar	5–0	Oriente Petrolero

==== Second leg ====
Oriente Petrolero	3–1	Bolívar

==== Extra match ====
Bolívar	1–0	Oriente Petrolero

== Aggregate table ==
Pos	Team	Pld	W	D	L	GF	GA	GD	Pts	Qualification
1	Bolívar	24	15	7	2	53	21	+32	37	1992 Copa Libertadores
2	Oriente Petrolero	24	13	7	4	48	22	+26	33	
3	San José	24	11	9	4	40	28	+12	31	1992 Copa Libertadores
4	Blooming	24	12	6	6	35	22	+13	30	
5	Orcobol	24	11	7	6	34	28	+6	29	
6	The Strongest	24	10	7	7	41	34	+7	27	
7	Independiente Petrolero	24	10	8	6	48	42	+6	24	
8	Jorge Wilstermann	24	8	8	8	21	26	−5	24	
9	Petrolero	24	8	6	10	31	26	+5	22	
10	Destroyers	24	6	6	12	29	43	−14	18	
11	Ciclón	24	5	7	12	19	28	−9	17	
12	Real Santa Cruz	24	3	9	12	11	29	−18	15	
13	Chaco Petrolero	24	4	6	14	20	47	−27	14	
14	Always Ready	24	4	3	17	23	57	−34	11	Relegation to Copa Simón Bolívar

=== Copa Libertadores Playoff ===
San José	1–0	Oriente Petrolero
