= 1991 Campeonato Ecuatoriano de Fútbol Serie A =

Serie A
- Season: 1991
- Champions: Barcelona (11th title)
- Relegated: Macará; Juvenil
- Copa Libertadores: Barcelona; Valdez
- Matches: 242
- Goals: 684 (2.83 per match)

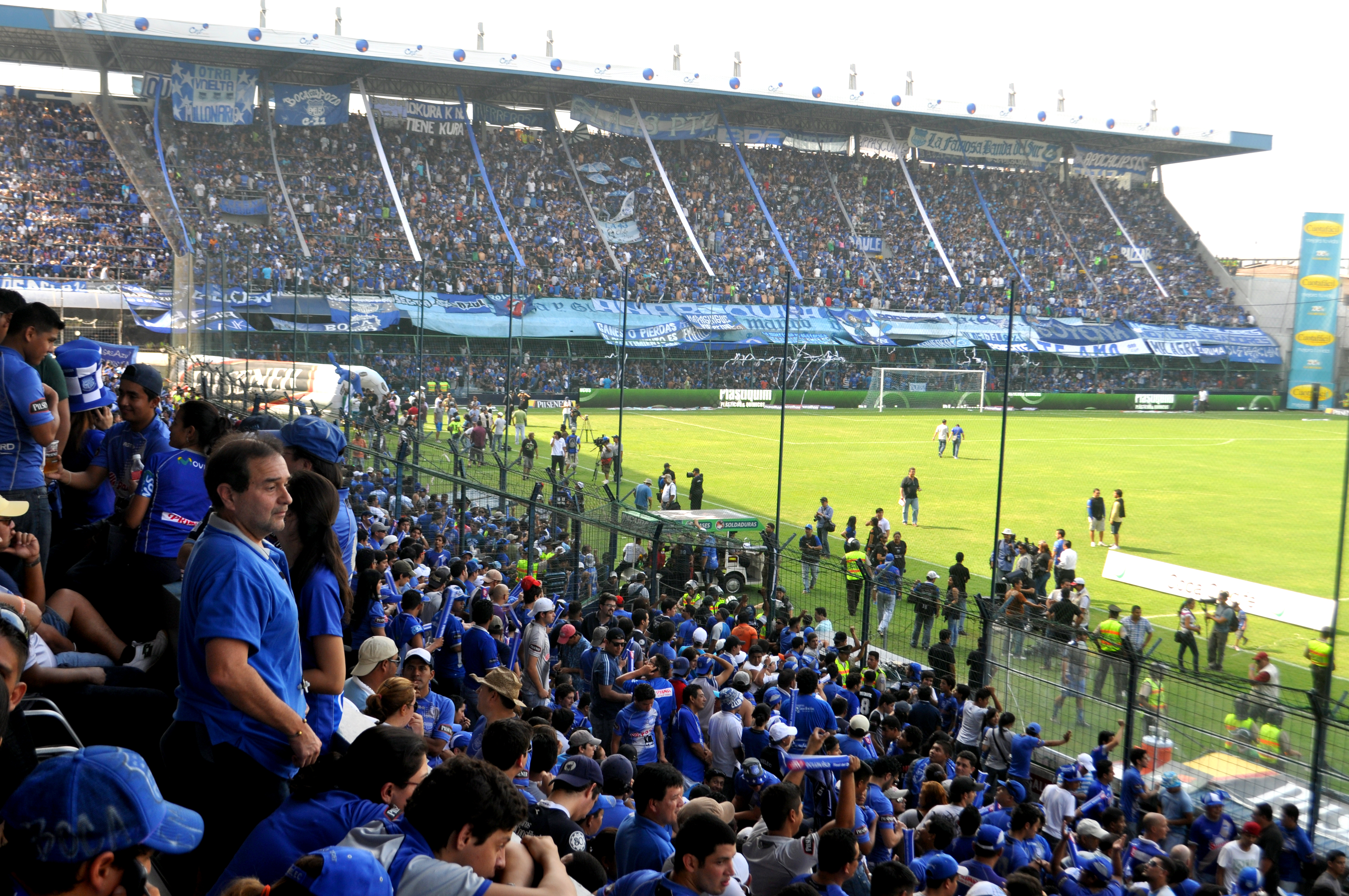
George Capwell Stadium during a football match

The 1991 Campeonato Ecuatoriano de Fútbol de la Serie A was the 33rd season of the Serie A, the top level of professional football in Ecuador.

== Teams ==
The number of teams for this season was played by 12 teams.

(In First Stage)

Club	City
Barcelona	Guayaquil
Delfín	Manta
Deportivo Cuenca	Cuenca
Deportivo Quito	Quito
El Nacional	Quito
Emelec	Guayaquil
Juvenil	Esmeraldas
LDU Quito	Quito
Macará	Ambato
Técnico Universitario	Ambato
Universidad Católica	Quito
Valdez	Guayaquil

(In Second Stage)

Club	City
Barcelona	Guayaquil
Delfín	Manta
Deportivo Cuenca	Cuenca
Deportivo Quito	Quito
El Nacional	Quito
Emelec	Guayaquil
Green Cross	Manta
Juvenil	Esmeraldas
LDU Quito	Quito
Técnico Universitario	Ambato
Universidad Católica	Quito
Valdez	Guayaquil

== First stage ==
Pos	Team	Pld	W	D	L	GF	GA	GD	Pts	Qualification or relegation
1	Barcelona	22	14	5	3	43	21	+22	33	
2	El Nacional	22	9	11	2	37	20	+17	29	
3	LDU Quito	22	10	7	5	45	26	+19	27	
4	Valdez	22	9	9	4	31	17	+14	27	
5	Emelec	22	7	9	6	30	36	−6	23	
6	Deportivo Quito	22	6	9	7	32	31	+1	21	
7	Técnico Universitario	22	8	5	9	30	30	0	21	
8	Universidad Católica	22	6	7	9	20	24	−4	19	Relegation Ligulla
9	Deportivo Cuenca	22	7	5	10	23	28	−5	19	Relegation Ligulla
10	Juvenil	22	5	8	9	20	39	−19	18	Relegation Ligulla
11	Delfín	22	5	4	13	27	45	−18	14	Relegation Ligulla
12	Macará (R)	22	3	7	12	20	41	−21	13	Relegated to the Serie B

Source: RSSSF 1991 - Serie A
Rules for classification: 1) points; 2) goal difference; 3) number of goals scored.
(R) Relegated

== Second stage ==
=== Group A ===
Pos	Team	Pld	W	D	L	GF	GA	GD	Pts
1	Barcelona	10	5	4	1	20	10	+10	14
2	Emelec	10	5	3	2	17	10	+7	13
3	Deportivo Cuenca	10	4	2	4	13	12	+1	10
4	Delfín	10	4	2	4	13	15	−2	10
5	LDU Quito	10	3	3	4	14	13	+1	9
6	Universidade Católica	10	1	2	7	12	29	−17	4

Source: RSSSF 1991 - Serie A
Rules for classification: 1) points; 2) goal difference; 3) number of goals scored.

=== Group B ===
Pos	Team	Pld	W	D	L	GF	GA	GD	Pts
1	Valdez	10	5	3	2	12	8	+4	13
2	El Nacional	10	5	2	3	21	9	+12	12
3	Técnico Universitario	10	5	2	3	20	13	+7	12
4	Green Cross	10	5	0	5	17	19	−2	10
5	Deportivo Quito	10	3	3	4	15	14	+1	9
6	Juvenil	10	1	2	7	11	33	−22	4

Source: RSSSF 1991 - Serie A
Rules for classification: 1) points; 2) goal difference; 3) number of goals scored.

== Third stage ==
=== Group A ===
Pos	Team	Pld	W	D	L	GF	GA	GD	Pts	Qualification or relegation
1	Valdez (Note: Valdez were awarded 1.5 points.)	6	3	2	1	7	6	+1	9.5	Qualified to the Cuadrangular Final
2	Barcelona (Note: Barcelona were awarded 2 points.)	6	3	1	2	12	7	+5	9	Qualified to the Cuadrangular Final
3	Técnico Universitario	6	2	1	3	8	10	−2	5	
4	Green Cross	6	1	2	3	8	12	−4	4	

Source: RSSSF - 1991 Serie A

=== Group B ===
Pos	Team	Pld	W	D	L	GF	GA	GD	Pts	Qualification or relegation
1	El Nacional (Note: El Nacional were awarded 1.5 point.)	6	2	2	2	5	3	+2	7.5	Qualified to the Cuadrangular Final
2	Deportivo Quito	6	3	1	2	9	11	−2	7	Qualified to the Cuadrangular Final
3	LDU Quito (Note: LDU Quito were awarded 0.5 point.)	6	2	2	2	9	7	+2	6.5	
4	Emelec (Note: Emelec were awarded 0.5 point.)	6	2	1	3	8	10	−2	5.5	

Source: RSSSF - 1991 Serie A

== Relegation Liguilla ==
Pos	Team	Pld	W	D	L	GF	GA	GD	Pts	Qualification or relegation
1	Deportivo Cuenca	6	4	1	1	12	5	+7	9	
2	Delfín	6	3	1	2	11	7	+4	7	
3	Universidad Católica (Note: Universidad Católica were deducted 1 point.)	6	2	0	4	8	9	−1	3	
4	Juvenil (Note: Juvenil were deducted 0.5 point.) (R)	6	2	0	4	5	15	−10	3.5	Relegated to the Serie B

Source: RSSSF - 1991 Serie A
(R) Relegated

== Cuadrangular Final ==
Pos	Team	Pld	W	D	L	GF	GA	GD	Pts	Qualification or relegation
1	Barcelona (C)	6	4	2	0	12	6	+6	10	1992 Copa Libertadores
2	El Nacional	6	1	3	2	8	12	−4	5	Second-Place Playoffs
3	Valdez	6	2	1	3	7	11	−4	5	Second-Place Playoffs
4	Deportivo Quito	6	2	0	4	9	7	+2	4	

Source: RSSSF - 1991 Serie A
(C) Champions

Serie A
1991 champion

11th title

=== Second-place playoffs ===
Team 1	Score	Team 2
Valdez	2–1	El Nacional
El Nacional	0–0	Valdez
