= 1986–87 Venezuelan Primera División season =

Venezuelan Primera División
- Season: 1986–87
- Champions: Marítimo (1st title)

The 1986–87 season of the Venezuelan Primera División, the top category of Venezuelan football, was played by 15 teams. The national champions were Marítimo.

== Results ==
=== Oriental Group ===
Pos	Team	Pld	W	D	L	GF	GA	GD	Pts
1	Marítimo	24	15	6	3	38	14	+24	36
2	Deportivo Italia	24	9	10	5	31	20	+11	28
3	Caracas	24	8	9	7	21	21	0	25
4	Mineros de Guayana	24	7	8	9	18	24	−6	22
5	Atlético Anzoátegui	24	7	6	11	20	26	−6	20
6	Universidad Central	24	7	6	11	25	38	−13	20
7	Deportivo Galicia	24	5	7	12	15	25	−10	17

=== Occidental Group ===
Pos	Team	Pld	W	D	L	GF	GA	GD	Pts
1	Portuguesa	24	10	11	3	29	13	+16	31
2	Estudiantes de Mérida	24	11	9	4	28	24	+4	31
3	Unión Atlético Táchira	24	10	7	7	28	21	+7	27
4	Unión Deportivo Lara	24	6	12	6	12	14	−2	24
5	Atlético Zamora	24	5	9	10	22	24	−2	19
6	Llaneros	24	4	10	10	22	33	−11	18
7	Universidad de Los Andes	24	5	8	11	19	31	−12	18

=== Final stage ===
Pos	Team	Pld	W	D	L	GF	GA	GD	Pts
1	Marítimo	14	8	4	2	13	3	+10	20
2	Unión Atlético Táchira	14	8	3	3	21	10	+11	19
3	Estudiantes de Mérida	14	6	3	5	15	15	0	15
4	Caracas	14	3	7	4	8	10	−2	13
5	Unión Deportivo Lara	14	5	3	6	16	18	−2	13
6	Mineros de Guayana	14	4	4	6	9	10	−1	12
7	Portuguesa	14	3	5	6	13	18	−5	11
8	Deportivo Italia	14	1	7	6	7	18	−11	9
