= 1992–93 Venezuelan Primera División season =

Venezuelan Primera División
- Season: 1992–93
- Champions: Marítimo (4th title)

The 1992–93 season of the Venezuelan Primera División, the top category of Venezuelan football, was played by 16 teams. The national champions were Marítimo.

== Results ==
=== Standings ===
Pos	Team	Pld	W	D	L	GF	GA	GD	Pts
1	Marítimo	30	16	9	5	63	34	+29	41
2	Minervén	30	16	9	5	59	23	+36	41
3	Caracas	30	18	4	8	52	35	+17	40
4	Unión Atlético Táchira	30	17	5	8	53	34	+19	39
5	Mineros de Guayana	30	15	8	7	62	35	+27	38
6	Trujillanos	30	13	12	5	46	34	+12	38
7	Anzoátegui FC	30	12	10	8	54	39	+15	34
8	Estudiantes de Mérida	30	13	8	9	39	26	+13	34
9	Unión Deportivo Lara	30	11	12	7	32	25	+7	34
10	Monagas	30	13	6	11	49	34	+15	32
11	Llaneros	30	8	11	11	33	45	−12	27
12	Universidad de Los Andes	30	5	10	15	27	55	−28	20
13	Atlético Zamora	30	6	6	18	21	61	−40	18
14	Deportivo Italia	30	5	7	18	26	53	−27	17
15	Deportivo Galicia	30	3	9	18	29	63	−34	15
16	Portuguesa	30	4	4	22	19	68	−49	12

=== Championship playoff ===
June 6, 1993

Minervén	1–0	Marítimo

June 13, 1993

Marítimo	1–0	Minervén
Penalties
	7–6
