= Pepeganga Margarita F.C. =

Venezuelan football club

Pepeganga Margarita
- Full name: Pepeganga Margarita Fútbol Club
- Founded: 1985
- Dissolved: 1990
- Ground: Nueva Esparta; Porlamar, Venezuela
- Capacity: 16,100

Pepeganga Margarita Fútbol Club (usually called Pepeganga Margarita) was a professional club founded on 1985. The club won one Second Division title in 1986–87 season. The club was based in Isla Margarita, Nueva Esparta.

== History ==
In the 1990 Copa Libertadores, the club was eliminated by Independiente in the Round of 16.

== Honours ==
- Venezuelan Primera División: 0

Runner-up (1): 1988–89

- Venezuelan Segunda División: 3

Winners (1): 1986–87

== Performance in CONMEBOL competitions ==
- Copa Libertadores: 1 appearance

1990: Round of 16
