= C.S. Marítimo de La Guaira =

Venezuelan football club

Marítimo
- Full name: Club Sport Marítimo de La Guaira
- Nickname: El Acorazado rojiverde
- Founded: 1 May 1959; 66 years ago (as C.S. Marítimo de Venezuela); 2022; 4 years ago (refoundation)
- Ground: José María Vargas, La Guaira, Venezuela
- Capacity: 1,000
- President: Roberto Gomes
- Head coach: Alfarabi Romero
- League: Venezuelan Segunda División
Home colours	Away colours

Club Sport Marítimo de La Guaira (formerly Club Sport Marítimo de Venezuela), known as Marítimo de La Guaira or just Marítimo, is a football team from La Guaira, Venezuela. Founded in 1959 and refounded in 2022, they play in the Venezuelan Segunda División.

== History ==
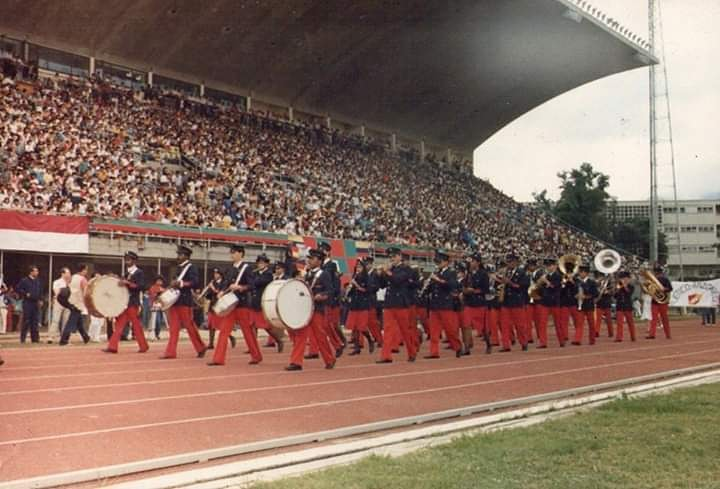
Marítimo fans during a match in 1986

The club was founded on 1 May 1959 by Portuguese immigrants living in Caracas, who based their new club on their favourite team from back home, C.S. Marítimo, from the island of Madeira. They only played amateur tournaments until 1985, when a group of supporters registered the club in the Venezuelan Segunda División, as a replacement to dissolved Deportivo Portugués.

Marítimo achieved immediate promotion to the Venezuelan Primera División, having Rafael Santana as their manager in 1986, their first season in the top tier, and reached the final stages but finished third.

In the 1986–87 season, Marítimo topped the Oriental Group, with only three losses in 24 matches, and also won the final stage, winning the first division for the first time ever and qualifying to the 1988 Copa Libertadores. After a second consecutive title in the 1987–88 campaign, they lost the 1988–89 title to Mineros de Guayana, but won the title again in 1989–90; after being tied on points with Unión Atlético Táchira in the regular season, they won the title after a 2–0 win in a play-off match.

After two seasons in the top three, Marítimo won their fourth title in 1992–93, after defeating Minervén on penalties. However, financial problems led the club to end their first team squad in 1995.

In November 2022, the club was refounded under the name of Club Sport Marítimo de La Guaira in the city of La Guaira, and returned to action in the 2023 Segunda División, after acquiring the place of Unión Local Andina.

== Honours ==
=== National ===
- Venezuelan Primera División
  - Winners (4): 1986–87, 1987–88, 1989–90, 1992–93
- Copa de Venezuela
  - Winners (2): 1988, 1989
- Venezuelan Segunda División
  - Winners (2): 1985, 2003–04

== Performance in CONMEBOL competitions ==
- Copa Libertadores: 5 appearances

1988: First round
1989: First round
1991: First round
1992: Round of 16
1994: First round

- Copa CONMEBOL: 1 appearance

1992: First Round
