= Unión Local Andina F.C. =

Venezuelan football club

ULA
- Full name: Unión Local Andina Fútbol Club
- Nickname(s): Universidad de Los Andes; ULA
- Founded: 28 February 1977
- Dissolved: 2023
- Ground: Estadio Guillermo Soto Rosa; Mérida, Venezuela
- Capacity: 15,000
- 2022: Segunda División, 17th of 20
Home colours	Away colours

Unión Local Andina Fútbol Club, usually known as Universidad de Los Andes, or by the acronym ULA, was a Venezuelan football club based in Mérida.

== History ==
The club was founded on 28 February 1977, as Universidad de Los Andes Mérida Fútbol Club. In 2017, they changed name to Unión Local Andina Fútbol Club.

ULA played their last season in 2022 before selling his place in the Segunda División to Marítimo de La Guaira.

== Honours ==
=== National ===
- Primera División
  - Winners (2): 1983, 1990–91
- Copa Venezuela
  - Winners (1): 1995–96
- Segunda División
  - Winners (2): 1986, 1994–95

== Performance in CONMEBOL competitions ==
- Copa Libertadores: 3 appearances

1984: Semi-Finals
1992: First Round
:

== Copa Libertadores participations ==
ULA played in the Copa Libertadores three times: in 1984, in the first stage, the club was in the same group of Portuguesa, of Venezuela, and two Peruvian teams, Sporting Cristal, and Melgar. The club finished in the first position, together with Sporting Cristal. A first place playoff was played, and ULA won 2–1. In the second stage, the club was in the same group of two Brazilian clubs, Flamengo, and Grêmio, and was eliminated after finishing in the last position.

In 1992, the club was, in the first stage, in the same group of S.C. Marítimo, of Venezuela, and Barcelona and Valdez, of Ecuador. ULA and Marítimo finished in the third position, so, a third place playoff was played. Marítimo won 1–0, and Universidad de Los Andes was eliminated.

In 1999, ULA disputed the preliminary stage of the competition, with Estudiantes de Mérida, of Venezuela, and Necaxa and Monterrey, of Mexico. The club was eliminated after finishing in the last position.

== Stadium ==
ULA's home stadium was Estadio Guillermo Soto Rosa, which has a maximum capacity of 15,000 people.

== Colors ==
The club's colors are blue and white.
