= 1983 Copa Libertadores finals =

1983 Copa Libertadores de América finals
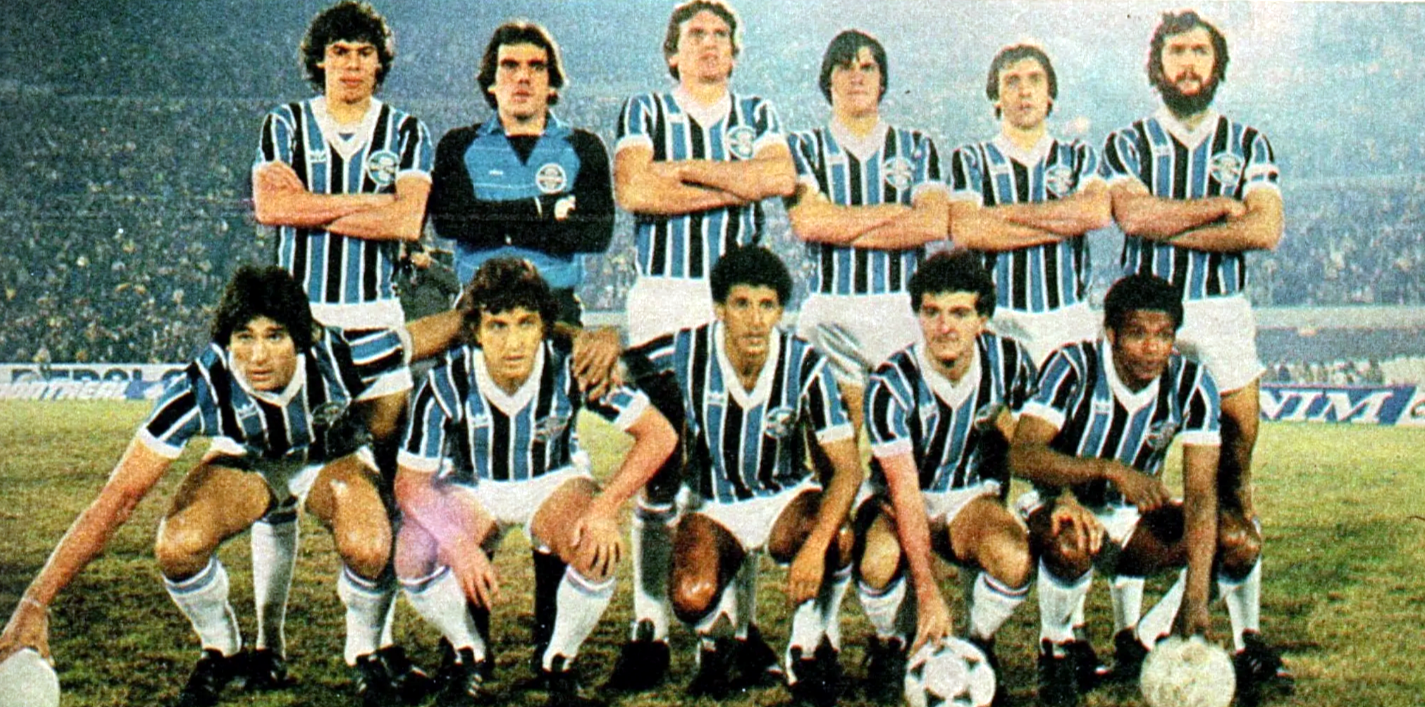
- Gremio, champions
- Event: 1983 Copa Libertadores
Peñarol	Gremio
(Uruguay)	(Brazil)
2	3

First leg
Peñarol	Gremio
1	1
- Date: 22 July 1983
- Venue: Estadio Centenario, Montevideo
- Attendance: 70,000

Second leg
Gremio	Peñarol
2	1
- Date: 28 July 1983
- Venue: Olímpico, Porto Alegre
- Attendance: 80,000

The 1983 Copa Libertadores de América finals was the final two-legged tie to determine the Copa Libertadores de América champion. It was contested by Brazilian club Grêmio and Uruguayan club Peñarol. The first leg of the tie was played on 22 July at Estadio Centenario in Montevideo, with the second leg played on 28 July at Estádio Olímpico Monumental in Porto Alegre.

With the first game tied 1-1, Grêmio were crowned champions after winning the second leg 2–1.

== Qualified teams ==
Team	Previous finals appearances (bold indicates winners)
(Uruguay) Peñarol	7 (**1960**, **1961**, 1962, **1966**, 1965, 1970, **1982**
(Brazil) Grêmio	None

== Venues ==
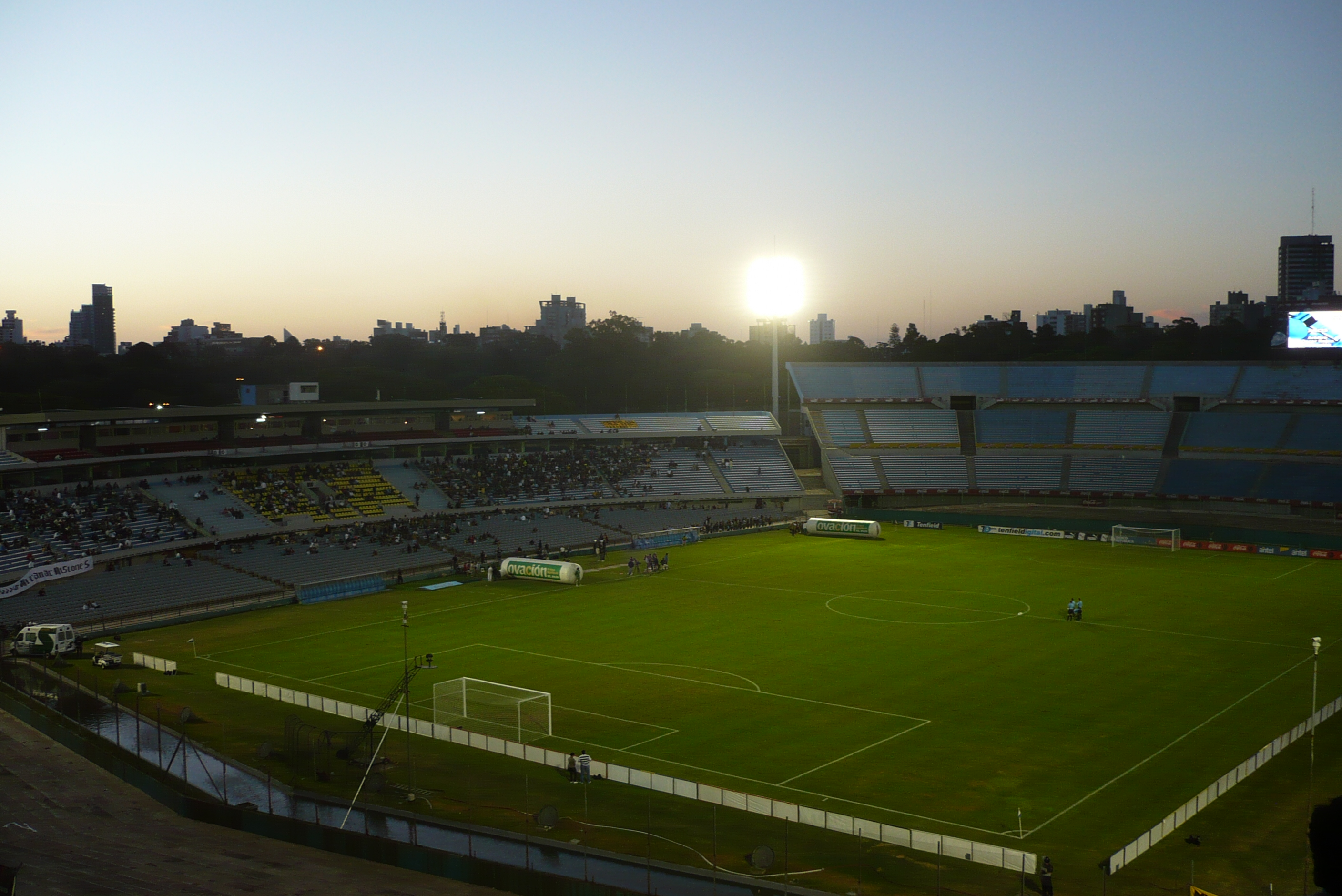
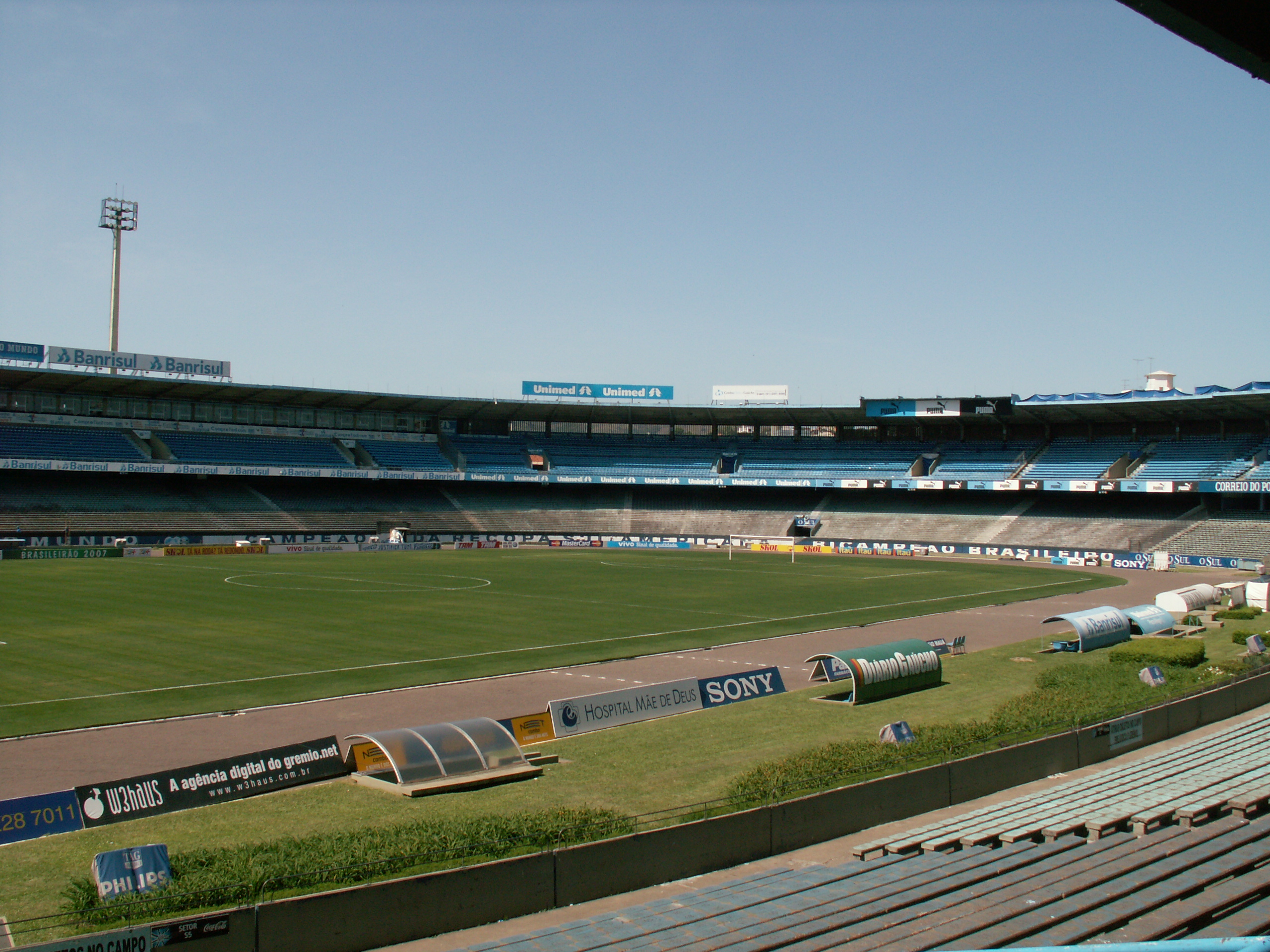
Estadio Centenario (left) and Estadio Olimpico Monumental, venues for the series

== Format ==
The finals was played over two legs; home and away. The team that accumulated the most points —two for a win, one for a draw, zero for a loss— after the two legs was crowned champion. If the two teams were tied on points after the second leg, a playoff at a neutral was to be the tie-breaker. Goal difference was to be used as a last resort to crown a champion.

== Match details ==
=== First leg ===
1983 Copa Libertadores finals
22 July 1983
First leg

Peñarol (Uruguay)	1–1	(Brazil) Grêmio
Morena 35'	Report	Tita 12'

Estadio Centenario, Montevideo
Attendance: 70,000
Referee: Teodoro Nitti (Argentina)

**Peñarol**	**Grêmio**

GK	1	(Uruguay) Gustavo Fernández
RB	14	(Uruguay) Néstor Montelongo
CB	2	(Uruguay) Walter Olivera (c)
CB	3	(Uruguay) Nelson Gutiérrez
LB	4	(Uruguay) Víctor Diogo
DM	8	(Uruguay) Mario Saralegui
CM	5	(Uruguay) Miguel Bossio	(yellow card) 78'
CM	24	(Uruguay) José Zalazar
RW	11	(Uruguay) Venancio Ramos
CF	9	(Uruguay) Fernando Morena	(yellow card) 79'
LW	7	(Uruguay) Walkir Silva		(substituted off) 72'
Substitutes:
MF	16	(Uruguay) José Villarreal		(substituted on) 72'
Manager:
(Uruguay) Hugo Bagnulo

GK	24	(Brazil) Mazarópi
RB	17	(Brazil) Paulo Roberto
CB	13	(Brazil) Baidek
CB	6	(Uruguay) Hugo De León (c)
LB	4	(Brazil) Casemiro
DM	5	(Brazil) China
CM	8	(Brazil) Osvaldo
AM	10	(Brazil) Tita
RW	7	(Brazil) Renato Gaúcho
CF	23	(Brazil) Caio	(substituted off) 46'
LW	16	(Brazil) Tarciso
Substitutes:
FW	9	(Brazil) César	(substituted on) 46'
Manager:
(Brazil) Valdir Espinosa

=== Second leg ===
28 July 1983
Second leg

Grêmio (Brazil)	2–1	(Uruguay) Peñarol
Caio 9'; César 78'	Report	Morena 70'

Estadio Olímpico, Porto Alegre
Attendance: 80,000
Referee: Edison Pérez (Perú)

**Grêmio**	**Peñarol**

GK	24	(Brazil) Mazarópi
RB	17	(Brazil) Paulo Roberto	(yellow card) 43'
CB	13	(Brazil) Baidek	(yellow card) 86'
CB	6	(Uruguay) Hugo De León (c)
LB	4	(Brazil) Casemiro
DM	5	(Brazil) China
CM	8	(Brazil) Osvaldo
AM	10	(Brazil) Tita	(yellow card) 25'
RW	7	(Brazil) Renato Gaúcho	(red card) 88'
CF	23	(Brazil) Caio		(substituted off) 63'
LW	16	(Brazil) Tarciso
Substitutes:
FW	9	(Brazil) César	(yellow card) 83'	(substituted on) 63'
Manager:
(Brazil) Valdir Espinosa

GK	1	(Uruguay) Gustavo Fernández
RB	14	(Uruguay) Néstor Montelongo
CB	2	(Uruguay) Walter Olivera (c)	(yellow card) 4'
CB	3	(Uruguay) Nelson Gutiérrez
LB	4	(Uruguay) Víctor Diogo
DM	8	(Uruguay) Mario Saralegui	(yellow card) 16'
CM	5	(Uruguay) Miguel Bossio
CM	24	(Uruguay) José Zalazar
RW	11	(Uruguay) Venancio Ramos	(red card) 88'
CF	9	(Uruguay) Fernando Morena
LW	7	(Uruguay) Walkir Silva		Substituted off
Substitutes:
DF		(Uruguay) Miguel A. Peirano		Substituted on
Manager:
(Uruguay) Hugo Bagnulo
