= 1984 Copa Libertadores finals =

1984 Copa Libertadores de América finals
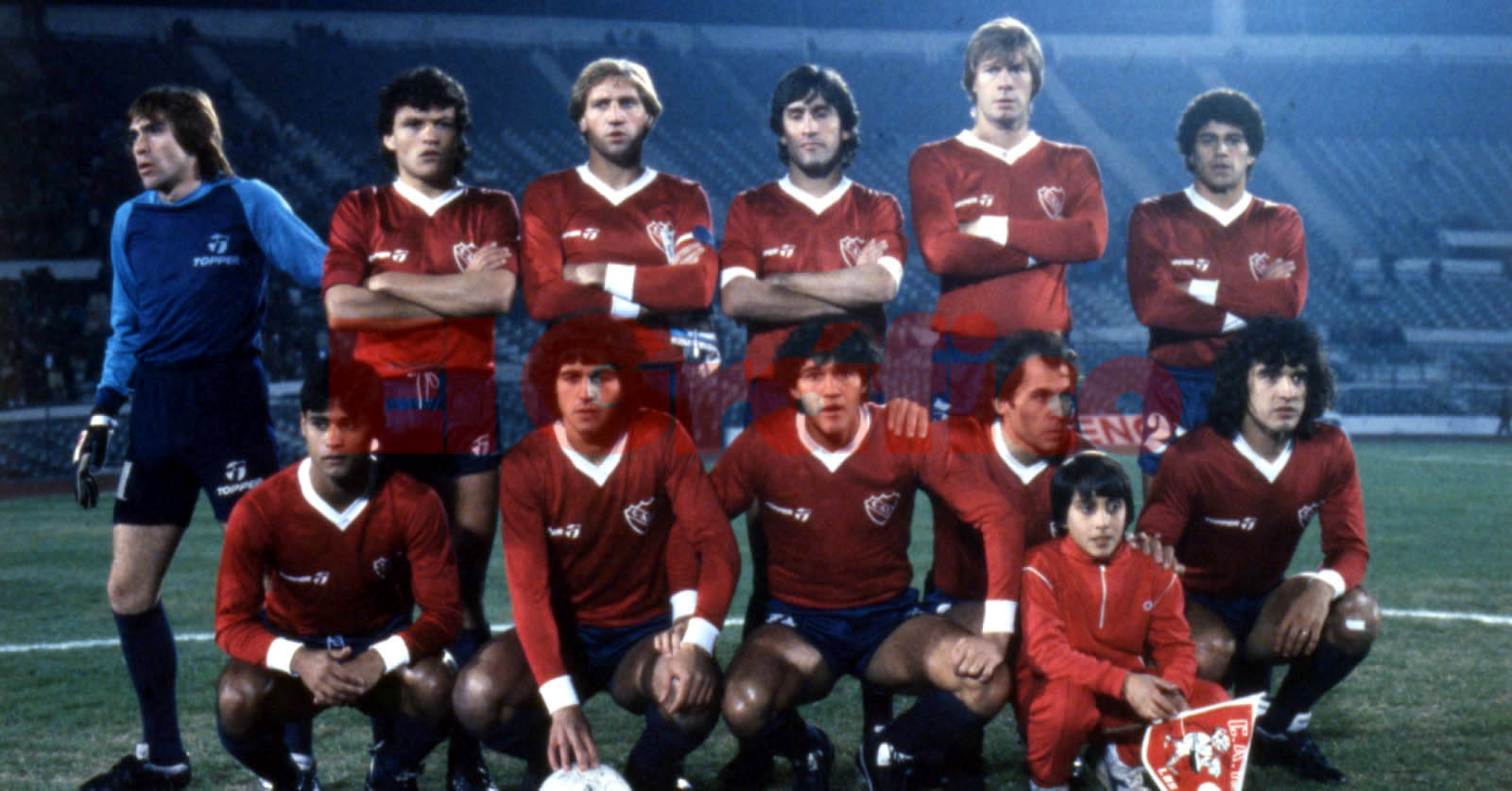
- Independiente, champions
- Event: 1984 Copa Libertadores
Grêmio	Independiente
(Brazil)	(Argentina)
0	1

First leg
Grêmio	Independiente
0	1
- Date: 24 July 1984
- Venue: Estádio Olímpico, Porto Alegre
- Referee: Juan Cardellino (Uruguay)
- Attendance: 75,000

Second leg
Independiente	Grêmio
0	0
- Date: 27 July 1984
- Venue: La Doble Visera, Avellaneda
- Referee: Mario Lira (Chile)
- Attendance: 60,000

The 1984 Copa Libertadores de América finals was the final two-legged tie to determine the champion of the 1984 edition. It was contested by Argentine club Independiente and Brazilian club Grêmio. The first leg of the tie was played on 24 July at Estádio Olímpico Monumental with the second leg played on 27 July at Estadio Libertadores de América.

Independiente won the series 1–0 on aggregate.

== Qualified teams ==
Team	Previous finals appearances (bold indicates winners)
(Brazil) Grêmio	**1983**
(Argentina) Independiente	**1964**, **1965**, **1972**, **1973**, **1974**, **1975**

== Venues ==
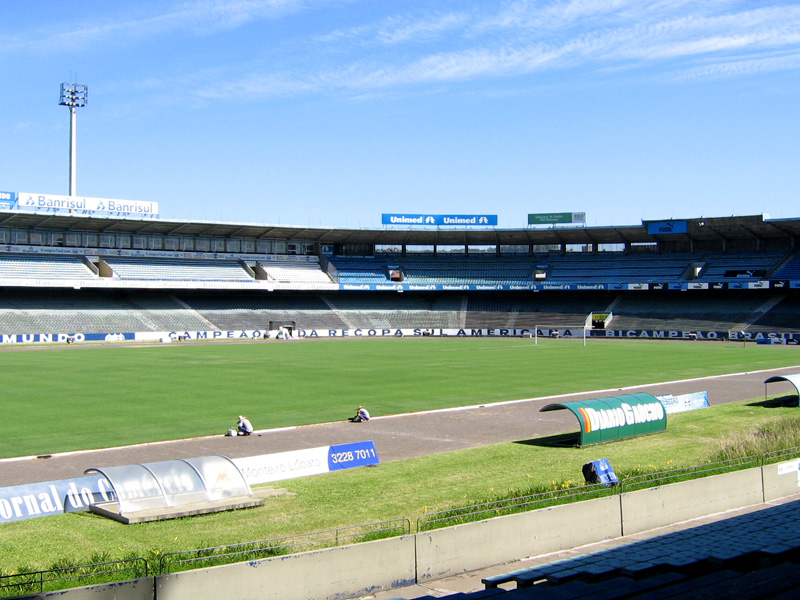
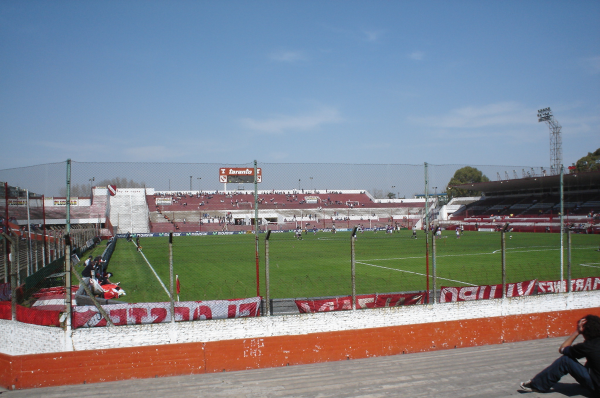
Estadio Olimpico Monumental (left) and Estadio La Doble Visera, venues for the series

== Format ==
The finals were played over two legs; home and away. The team that accumulated the most points —two for a win, one for a draw, zero for a loss— after the two legs was to be crowned the champion. If the two teams were tied on points after the second leg, a playoff at a neutral venue would become the next tie-breaker. Goal difference was going to be used as a last resort.

== Matches summary ==
=== First leg ===
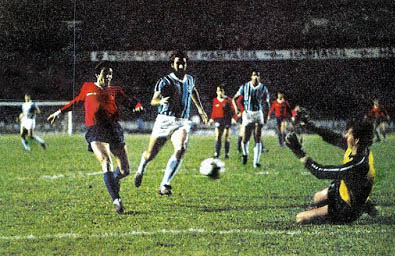
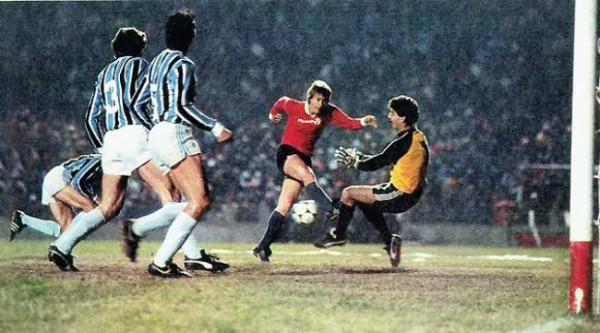
Two moments of the first leg in Porto Alegre, (left) the only goal of the match, scored by Jorge Burruchaga; (right): Claudio Marangoni attacking the Gremio's goal
1984 Copa Libertadores finals
24 July 1984
First leg

Grêmio (Brazil)	0–1	(Argentina) Independiente
	Report	Burruchaga 24'

Estádio Olímpico, Porto Alegre
Attendance: 75,000
Referee: Juan Cardellino (Uruguay)

**Grêmio**	**Independiente**

GK	1	(Brazil) João Marcos
RB	14	(Brazil) Casemiro
CB	3	(Brazil) Baidek
CB	6	(Uruguay) Hugo De León (c)
LB	4	(Brazil) Paulo César
DM	5	(Brazil) China
MF	8	(Brazil) Osvaldo
MF	15	(Brazil) Luís Carlos
RW	7	(Brazil) Renato Gaúcho
FW	17	(Brazil) Guilherme	(substituted off) 65'
LW	9	(Brazil) Tarciso
Substitutes:
FW	20	(Brazil) Gilson Gênio	(substituted on) 65'
Manager:
(Brazil) Carlos Froner

GK	1	(Uruguay) Carlos Goyén
RB	18	(Argentina) Néstor Clausen
CB	2	(Argentina) Hugo Villaverde
CB	6	(Argentina) Enzo Trossero (c)
LB	3	(Argentina) Carlos Enrique
MF	8	(Argentina) Ricardo Giusti
MF	5	(Argentina) Claudio Marangoni
FW	10	(Argentina) Ricardo Bochini
MF	9	(Argentina) Jorge Burruchaga
FW	23	(Argentina) Sergio Buffarini
FW	11	(Argentina) Alejandro Barberón	(substituted off) 79'
Substitutes:
FW	24	(Argentina) Gerardo Reinoso	(substituted on) 79'
Manager:
(Argentina) José Omar Pastoriza

=== Second leg ===
27 July 1984
Second leg

Independiente (Argentina)	0–0	(Brazil) Grêmio
	Report

Independiente Stadium, Avellaneda
Attendance: 60,000
Referee: Mario Lira (Chile)

**Independiente**	**Grêmio**

GK	1	(Uruguay) Carlos Goyén
RB	18	(Argentina) Néstor Clausen	(yellow card) 16'	(substituted off) 18'
CB	2	(Argentina) Hugo Villaverde
CB	6	(Argentina) Enzo Trossero (c)	(yellow card) 87'
LB	3	(Argentina) Carlos Enrique
MF	8	(Argentina) Ricardo Giusti
MF	5	(Argentina) Claudio Marangoni
FW	10	(Argentina) Ricardo Bochini
MF	9	(Argentina) Jorge Burruchaga
FW	23	(Argentina) Sergio Buffarini
FW	11	(Argentina) Alejandro Barberón
Substitutes:
DF	4	(Argentina) Rodolfo Zimmermann		(substituted on) 18'
Manager:
(Argentina) José Omar Pastoriza

GK	1	(Brazil) João Marcos
RB	14	(Brazil) Casemiro
CB	3	(Brazil) Baidek
CB	6	(Uruguay) Hugo De León (c)
LB	4	(Brazil) Paulo César
DM	5	(Brazil) China
MF	8	(Brazil) Osvaldo
MF	15	(Brazil) Luís Carlos	(yellow card) 75'
RW	7	(Brazil) Renato Gaúcho
CF	17	(Brazil) Guilherme	(yellow card) 14'
LW	9	(Brazil) Tarciso
Substitutes:
Manager:
(Brazil) Carlos Froner
