= 1983 Intercontinental Cup =

Hamburger SV	Grêmio
(West Germany)	(Brazil)
1	2
- After extra time
- Date: 11 December 1983
- Venue: National Stadium, Tokyo
- Man of the Match: Renato Gaúcho (Grêmio)
- Referee: Michel Vautrot (France)
- Attendance: 62,000

The 1983 Intercontinental Cup was an association football match played on 11 December 1983 between Hamburger SV, winners of the 1982–83 European Cup, and Grêmio, winners of the 1983 Copa Libertadores. The match was played at the National Stadium in Tokyo. Renato Gaúcho was named as man of the match.

== Venue ==
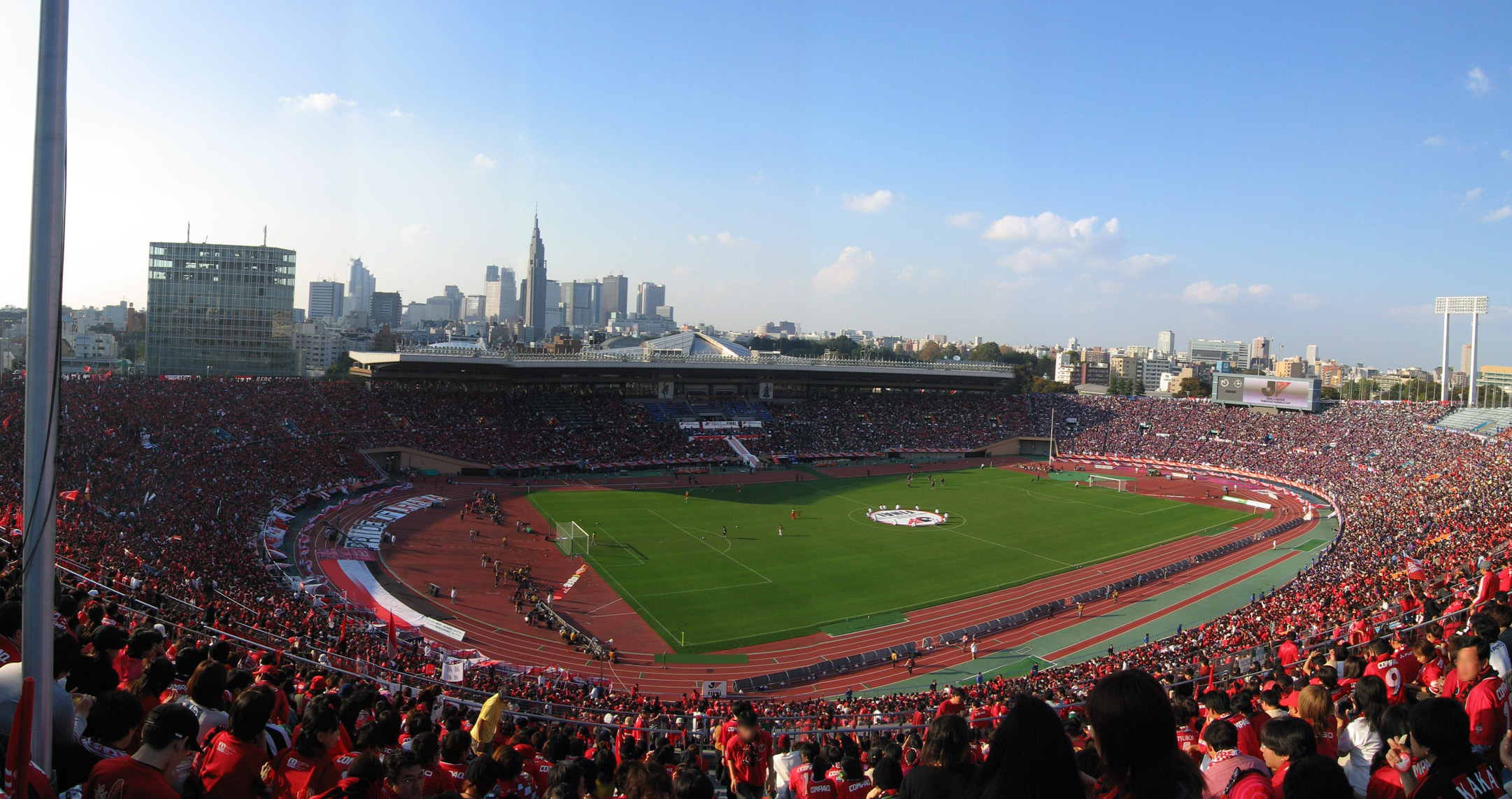
Olympic Stadium in Tokyo hosted the final

== Match details ==
11 December 1983
12:00 UTC+9

Hamburger SV (West Germany)	1–2 (a.e.t.)	(Brazil) Grêmio
Schröder 85'	Report	Renato Gaúcho 37', 93'

National Stadium, Tokyo
Attendance: 62,000
Referee: Michel Vautrot (France)

Hamburger SV	Grêmio

GK	1	(West Germany) Uli Stein	(yellow card) 76'
DF	3	(West Germany) Bernd Wehmeyer
DF	4	(West Germany) Ditmar Jakobs
DF	5	(West Germany) Holger Hieronymus
MF	2	(West Germany) Michael Schröder
MF	8	(West Germany) Jürgen Groh
MF	11	(West Germany) Wolfgang Rolff
MF	6	(West Germany) Jimmy Hartwig	(yellow card) 104'
MF	10	(West Germany) Felix Magath (c)
FW	7	(West Germany) Wolfram Wuttke
FW	9	(Denmark) Allan Hansen
Substitutes:
GK		(West Germany) Uwe Hain	(yellow card) 46'
DF		(West Germany) Dieter Brefort
MF		(West Germany) Thomas von Heesen
Manager:
(Austria) Ernst Happel

GK	1	(Brazil) Mazarópi	(yellow card) 78'
DF	2	(Brazil) Paulo Roberto
DF	3	(Brazil) Jorge Baidek
DF	6	(Uruguay) Hugo de León (c)	(yellow card) 113'
DF	4	(Brazil) Paulo César
MF	5	(Brazil) China
MF	8	(Brazil) Osvaldo		(substituted off) 78'
MF	11	(Brazil) Mário Sérgio
FW	7	(Brazil) Renato Gaúcho	(yellow card) 103'
FW	9	(Brazil) Tarciso
FW	10	(Brazil) Caju		(substituted off) 70'
Substitutes:
GK	12	(Brazil) Beto
DF	13	(Brazil) Leandro
DF	14	(Brazil) Casemiro
MF	15	(Brazil) Bonamigo		(substituted on) 78'
FW	16	(Brazil) Caio	(yellow card) 84'	(substituted on) 70'
Manager:
(Brazil) Valdir Espinosa

== See also ==
- 1982–83 European Cup
- 1983 Copa Libertadores
