= Beto (footballer, born 1959) =

Brazilian footballer (born 1959)

Personal information
- Full name: Roberto Gilmar Hinterholz
- Date of birth: 20 September 1959 (age 67)
- Place of birth: Crissiumal, Brazil
- Position: Goalkeeper

Youth career
- 1976–1980: Tupi-RS

Senior career*
Years	Team	Apps	(Gls)
1980–1988	Grêmio	50	(0)
1980	→ Juventude (loan)		
1988	Pato Branco		
1988	Coritiba		
1989	Chapecoense		
1989	Novo Hamburgo		
1990–1991	Juventude		
1991	Guarani-VA		
1992–1993	Mogi Mirim		
1993	Ypiranga de Erechim		
1994	São Luiz		
1995–1996	Atlético Carazinho		
1996	Novo Hamburgo		

Managerial career
- 2022: Tupi-RS
- * Club domestic league appearances and goals as of 23 January 2024

Roberto Gilmar Hinterholz (born 20 September 1959), simply known as Beto, is a Brazilian former professional footballer who played as a goalkeeper.

== Career ==
Born in Crissiumal, he started his career at Tupi. At the age of 20, he was taken to Grêmio for a test, and became Mazaropi immediate reserve in winning the 1983 Copa Libertadores and 1983 Intercontinental Cup. Beto also had notable spells at Juventude and Mogi Mirim EC.

== Personal life ==
After retiring, he became a goalkeeper coach, working for Grêmio, Internacional, Juventude, Juventus de Santa Rosa, and in recent years at Tupi de Crissiumal. In 2022, he had a brief experience as coach of the club, saving them from relegation in the Campeonato Gaúcho Série A2. Beto is uncle of the former goalkeeper and congressman Danrlei, as well as being Cláudio Taffarel first coach.

== Honours ==
Grêmio

- Intercontinental Cup: 1983
- Copa Libertadores: 1983
- Campeonato Gaúcho: 1985, 1986
