= Aldo Alvarado =

Chilean footballer

Personal information
- Full name: Aldo Noé Alvarado Peña
- Date of birth: 7 May 1961 (age 65)
- Place of birth: Viña del Mar, Chile
- Position: Forward

Youth career
- Santiago Wanderers

Senior career*
Years	Team	Apps	(Gls)
1981–1982	Santiago Wanderers		
1983	Universidad Católica (ECU)		
1984–1985	Macará		
1985–1986	Abdón Calderón		
1986	Club Brasilia		
- * Club domestic league appearances and goals

Aldo Noé Alvarado Peña (born 7 May 1961) is a Chilean former professional footballer who played as a forward for clubs in Chile and Ecuador.

== Career ==
A product of Santiago Wanderers youth system, he made his professional debut in a match against Unión La Calera on 22 March 1981. He made appearances for the club in 1981 and 1982.

Then, he went to Ecuador and signed with Universidad Católica in the 1983 Serie A. In 1984 he switched to Macará and ended his career playing for Abdón Calderón FC and Club Brasilia from Cotopaxi.

== Personal life ==
He has three children and has worked as a bank employee at the Banco Santander.

He does track and field and has competed in races such as the Ironman Triathlon in Pucón and marathon of Vitacura.
