= Paulo Roberto (footballer, born 1963) =

Brazilian footballer

Personal information
- Full name: Paulo Roberto Curtis Costa
- Date of birth: 27 January 1963 (age 63)
- Place of birth: Viamão, Brazil
- Position: Defender

Senior career*
Years	Team	Apps	(Gls)
1978–1983	Grêmio		
1984	São Paulo		
1985	Santos		
1986–1989	Vasco da Gama		
1989–1991	Botafogo		
1992–1994	Cruzeiro		
1994	Corinthians		
1995–1996	Atlético Mineiro		
1996–1997	Fluminense		
1998	Cerro Porteño		
1999–2000	Canoas		
- * Club domestic league appearances and goals

Paulo Roberto Curtis Costa (born 27 January 1963 in Viamão), known as just Paulo Roberto, is a Brazilian former professional footballer who played as a defender for Grêmio, São Paulo, Santos, Vasco da Gama, Botafogo, Cruzeiro, Corinthians, Atlético Mineiro, Fluminense and Canoas in his native Brazil as well as for Paraguayan club Cerro Porteño.

== Honours ==
Grêmio

- Brazilian Championship: 1981
- Copa Libertadores: 1983
- Intercontinental Cup: 1983

Vasco da Gama

- Campeonato Carioca: 1987, 1988

Botafogo

- Campeonato Carioca: 1990

Cruzeiro

- Campeonato Mineiro: 1992, 1994
- Supercopa Sudamericana: 1992
- Copa do Brasil: 1993

Atlético Mineiro

- Campeonato Mineiro: 1995
