= Valdir Espinosa =

Brazilian footballer (1947–2020)

Personal information
- Full name: Valdir Ataualpa Ramirez Espinosa
- Date of birth: 17 October 1947
- Place of birth: Porto Alegre, Brazil
- Date of death: 27 February 2020 (aged 72)
- Place of death: Rio de Janeiro, Brazil

Managerial career
- Years: Team
- 1979: Esportivo
- 1980: Ceará
- 1981: Londrina
- 1980–1984: Grêmio
- 1984–1985: Al-Hilal
- 1986: Grêmio
- 1987–1988: Cerro Porteño
- 1989: Botafogo
- 1989–1990: Flamengo
- 1990–1991: Botafogo
- 1992–1994: Cerro Porteño
- 1994: Atlético Mineiro
- 1995: Palmeiras
- 1996: Portuguesa
- 1996: Corinthians
- 1997: Fluminense
- 1997: Verdy Kawasaki
- 1998: Coritiba
- 1998–1999: Botafogo
- 2000–2001: Fluminense
- 2001: Vitória
- 2002: Atlético Paranaense
- 2004: Fluminense
- 2005: Brasiliense
- 2005: Ceará
- 2005: Fortaleza
- 2006: Flamengo
- 2006: Santa Cruz
- 2007: Cerro Porteño
- 2007: Vasco da Gama
- 2008: Portuguesa
- 2011: Duque de Caxias
- 2016: Metropolitano
- 2016–2017: Grêmio (Technical coordinator)

Valdir Ataualpa Ramirez Espinosa, known as Valdir Espinosa (17 October 1947 – 27 February 2020) was a Brazilian football manager. He died on 27 February 2020, of complications after surgery. Espinosa was born in Porto Alegre.

== Managerial statistics ==
Team	From	To	Record				
Team	From	To	G	W	D	L	Win %
Esportivo	1979	1979	53	23	21	9	43.40
Ceará	1980	1980	61	30	16	15	49.18
Londrina	1981	1981	49	24	9	16	48.98
Grêmio	1983	1983	73	30	28	15	41.10
Al-Hilal	1984	1985	26	19	5	2	73.08
Grêmio	1986	1986	60	32	15	13	53.33
Cerro Porteño	1987	1988	73	38	22	13	52.05
Botafogo	1989	1989	24	15	9	0	62.50
Flamengo	1989	1990	37	16	11	10	43.24
Botafogo	1990	1991	71	35	18	18	49.30
Cerro Porteño	1992	1994	92	45	32	15	48.91
Atlético Mineiro	1994	1994	28	11	8	9	39.29
Palmeiras	1995	1995	33	16	8	9	48.48
Portuguesa	4 January 1996	21 May 1996	19	12	5	2	63.16
Corinthians	23 May 1996	23 September 1996	24	14	7	3	58.33
Fluminense FC	5 January 1997	30 May 1997	27	11	10	6	40.74
Verdy Kawasaki	2 June 1997	30 October 1997	20	6	0	14	30.00
Coritiba	1998	1998	33	18	9	6	54.55
Botafogo	1998	3 July 1999	58	18	18	22	31.03
Fluminense FC	17 February 2000	30 June 2001	74	34	22	18	45.95
Vitória	2 July 2001	31 December 2001	27	9	9	9	33.33
Athletico Paranaense	2 January 2002	30 June 2002	31	13	9	9	41.94
Fluminense FC	30 December 2003	2 March 2004	9	6	1	2	66.67
Brasiliense	5 January 2005	17 March 2005	13	8	4	1	61.54
Ceará	10 March 2005	30 June 2005	25	7	8	10	28.00
Fortaleza	17 October 2005	31 December 2005	10	4	2	4	40.00
Flamengo	6 December 2005	3 March 2006	11	2	4	5	18.18
Santa Cruz	1 February 2006	12 December 2006	54	15	12	27	27.78
Cerro Porteño	25 April 2007	11 July 2007	7	4	1	2	57.14
Vasco da Gama	26 October 2007	31 December 2007	6	3	2	1	50.00
Portuguesa	30 May 2008	31 July 2008	13	5	2	6	38.46
Duque de Caxias	2011	2011	20	5	5	10	25.00
Metropolitano	3 January 2016	18 September 2016	24	7	5	12	29.17
Total			1,181	535	337	309	45.30

== Honours ==
Ceará

- Campeonato Cearense (1): 1980

Londrina

- Campeonato Paranaense (1): 1981

Grêmio

- Copa Libertadores (1): 1983
- Intercontinental Cup (1): 1983
- Campeonato Gaúcho (1): 1986

Al-Hilal

- Saudi Premier League (1): 1984–85

Cerro Porteño

- Liga Paraguaya (2): 1987, 1992

Botafogo

- Campeonato Carioca (1): 1989

Tokyo Verdy

- Emperor's Cup: 1997

Atlético Paranaense

- Campeonato Paranaense (1): 2002

Brasiliense

- Campeonato Brasiliense (1): 2005
