= Guilherme Macuglia =

Brazilian footballer (born 1961)

Personal information
- Full name: Guilherme Leoni de Moura Macuglia
- Date of birth: 27 August 1961 (age 65)
- Place of birth: Porto Alegre, Brazil

Youth career
- 1977–1981: Grêmio

Senior career*
Years	Team	Apps	(Gls)
1982	América-SP		
1982	Esportivo		
1983	Grêmio		
1984	Figueirense		
1987	Avaí		
1988–1991	Esportivo		
1991–1994	São Luiz		

Managerial career
- 1994: São Luiz
- 1995–1998: Ypiranga-RS
- 1998: Santo Ângelo
- 1999: Brasil de Pelotas
- 2000: Chapecoense
- 2000–2001: Pelotas
- 2003: 15 de Novembro
- 2003: Esportivo
- 2004: Novo Hamburgo
- 2006: Ulbra
- 2006: Criciúma
- 2007: Joinville
- 2007: Coritiba
- 2008: Guaratinguetá
- 2008: Figueirense
- 2008: São Caetano
- 2009: Guarani
- 2009: América de Natal
- 2009–2010: Náutico
- 2010: Chapecoense
- 2010–2011: Criciúma
- 2011: Caxias
- 2011: Paraná
- 2012: Rio Branco-AC
- 2013: Cerâmica
- 2013–2015: Marcílio Dias
- 2016: América de Natal
- 2016: Central
- 2017: Rio Branco-PR
- 2017: Ypiranga-RS
- 2024: São Caetano (assistant)
- 2024: São Caetano (interim)
- * Club domestic league appearances and goals

Guilherme Leoni de Moura Macuglia known as Guilherme Macuglia (born 27 August 1961 in Porto Alegre), is a Brazilian football coach and former player who played as a forward.

== Club statistics ==
Club performance			League		Cup		Continental		Total	
Season	Club	League	Apps	Goals	Apps	Goals	Apps	Goals	Apps	Goals
Brazil			League		Copa do Brasil		Libertadores		Total	
1984	Grêmio	Libertadores	0	0	0	0	6	3	6	3
Total							6	3	6	3

== Honours ==
=== Player ===
Grêmio

- Campeonato Gaúcho U-20: 1979

Esportivo

- Copa Governador do Rio Grande do Sul: 1980

São Luiz

- Campeonato Gaúcho Série B: 1989

=== Manager ===
Criciúma

- Campeonato Brasileiro Série C: 2006

Rio Branco

- Campeonato Acreano: 2012
