= Rodolfo Zimmermann =

Argentine footballer (1951–2012)

Personal information
- Full name: Rodolfo Enrique Zimmermann
- Date of birth: 13 June 1951
- Place of birth: Argentina
- Date of death: 29 April 2012 (aged 60)
- Place of death: Argentina
- Position: Defender

Senior career*
Years	Team	Apps	(Gls)
1971–1978	Colón		
1978–1981	Independiente		
1982	Huracán		
1982–1984	Independiente		
1985	Blooming		
- * Club domestic league appearances and goals

Rodolfo Enrique Zimmermann (13 June 1951 – 29 April 2012) was an Argentine football who played as a central defender.

== Career ==
He began his career in the youth ranks of Club Los Andes de Barranqueras, later distinguishing himself at Don Orione de Resistencia. At the age of 16, he made his debut in the first division of the Liga Santafesina with Peñarol de Rafaela, establishing himself as a promising talent in provincial football.

In 1971, he was signed by Club Atlético Colón, where he played on notable teams alongside figures such as Héctor Baley. During his time at Colón, he distinguished himself through his skill and leadership on the pitch.

In 1979, he joined Independiente. With the Avellaneda-based club, he won the First Division title in the 1983 Metropolitano Championship. Additionally, he won the 1984 Copa Libertadores and 1984 Intercontinental Cup by defeating Liverpool of England in the final.

Afterwards, he had brief stints with Huracán and Bolivia's Blooming, before returning to Argentina to finish his career at Ferro de General Pico, 9 de Julio de Rafaela, and Ben Hur.

== Honours ==
Independiente

- Argentine Primera División: 1983
- Copa Libertadores: 1984
- Intercontinental Cup: 1984

== Death ==
He passed away in Rafaela on April 29, 2012, after suffering from cancer. His remains were interred at Lar de Paz cemetery in Santa Fe de la Vera Cruz.
