= Caio (footballer, born 1955) =

Brazilian footballer

Personal information
- Full name: Luiz Carlos Tavares Franco
- Date of birth: 16 March 1955
- Place of birth: Rio de Janeiro, Brazil
- Date of death: 12 February 2019 (aged 63)
- Place of death: São Luís, Brazil
- Height: 1.84 m (6 ft 0 in)
- Position: Forward

Youth career
- –1975: Botafogo

Senior career*
Years	Team	Apps	(Gls)
1975–1979	Botafogo		
1975–1976	→ Madureira (loan)		
1977	→ Moto Club (loan)		
1978	→ Paysandu (loan)		
1978–1979	→ Moto Club (loan)		
1979–1982	Portuguesa		
1983–1984	Grêmio	75	(19)
1985–1987	Tuna Luso		
1987–1989	Moto Club		
1990–1991	Sampaio Corrêa		
- * Club domestic league appearances and goals as of 22 January 2024

Luiz Carlos Tavares Franco (16 March 1955 – 12 February 2019), better known as Caio, was a Brazilian professional footballer who played as a forward.

== Career ==
A graduate of Botafogo's youth categories, he had little space in the main team, being loaned most of the time. He found the chance to be state champion in 1977 at the Moto Club. He also had a successful spell at Portuguesa, where he was notable for scoring beautiful goals, such as one scored against CA Juventus in the 1979 Campeonato Paulista. He was hired by Grêmio in 1983 and won the Copa Libertadores and Copa Intercontinental with the club. He returned to Maranhão at the end of his career and was two-time champion playing for Sampaio Correa. Caio retired at age 36.

== Honours ==
Grêmio

- Intercontinental Cup: 1983
- Copa Libertadores: 1983

Moto Club

- Campeonato Maranhense: 1977, 1989

Sampaio Corrêa

- Campeonato Maranhense: 1990, 1991

== Death ==
Caio died on 12 February 2019, at the age of 63, due to circulatory problems that caused a thrombosis.
