= Hugo de León =

Uruguayan footballer and manager (born 1958)

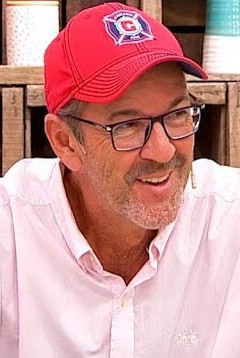
- Hugo de León in 2019

Personal information
- Full name: Hugo Eduardo de León Rodríguez
- Date of birth: 27 February 1958 (age 68)
- Place of birth: Rivera, Uruguay
- Height: 1.87 m (6 ft 1 1/2 in)
- Position: Defender

Senior career*
Years	Team	Apps	(Gls)
1977–1980	Nacional		
1981–1984	Grêmio	83	(2)
1984–1985	Corinthians	24	(0)
1986–1987	Santos		
1987–1988	Logroñés	16	(0)
1988–1989	Nacional		
1989–1990	River Plate	12	(0)
1991	Botafogo	12	(0)
1991–1992	Toshiba SC		
1992–1993	Nacional		

International career
1979–1990	Uruguay	48	(0)

Managerial career
- 1996: Ituano
- 1997: Fluminense
- 1998–2001: Nacional
- 2003: Monterrey
- 2004: Nacional
- 2004: Monterrey
- 2005: Grêmio
Medal record
Representing Uruguay
World Champions’ Gold Cup
Winner	1980 Uruguay
Copa América
Runner-up	1989 Brazil
- * Club domestic league appearances and goals

Hugo Eduardo de León Rodríguez (born 27 February 1958) is a Uruguayan football coach and former player, who played as a defender.

== Club career ==
De León joined Nacional in 1977. With Nacional, he won two Uruguayan league titles, in 1977 and 1980, and the Copa Libertadores in 1980. In 1981, he left Nacional to play for Gremio missing the final game of the 1980 Intercontinental Cup which Nacional would subsequently win. With Gremio he won the Copa Libertadores and the Intercontinental Cup in 1983. After spells in Brazil and Spain he returned to Nacional in 1988, to win the Copa Libertadores and Intercontinental Cup in that year, and the Copa Interamericana and Recopa Sudamericana in 1989. At the end of the year, he left Nacional to play for River Plate of Argentina, where he won the 1989/1990 league title. He returned to Nacional in 1992 and won his third Uruguayan league title as a player. He retired in 1993.

== International career ==
The 187 cm defender was capped 48 times for Uruguay between July 1979 and June 1990, including four games at the 1990 World Cup. De León helped the Uruguay national team win the 1980 Mundialito, a tournament celebrating the 50th anniversary of the first World Cup. De Leon also led Uruguay to a 2nd place finish at the 1989 Copa America hosted in Brazil.

== Coaching career ==
As a coach, De León was in charge of several clubs in Uruguay, Brazil and México, including Nacional, Gremio and Monterrey. As coach of Nacional, they won the Uruguayan league titles of 1998, 2000 and 2001.

Because of a conflict with the Uruguayan coaches' association, who does not validate the coach course he took in Brazil, De León has not worked in Uruguay since 2004.

== Political career ==
De León was a candidate for Vice President of Uruguay, alongside Pedro Bordaberry, in the 2009 Uruguayan general election.
