= Jorge Baidek =

Brazilian footballer (born 1960)

Baidek
Personal information
- Full name: Jorge Baidek
- Date of birth: 16 April 1960 (age 66)
- Place of birth: Barão de Cotegipe, Brazil
- Height: 1.89 m (6 ft 2 in)
- Position: Centre-back

Youth career
- –1978: Grêmio

Senior career*
| Years | Team | Apps | (Gls) |
| 1979–1987 | Grêmio | 287 | (2) |
| 1987–1991 | Belenenses | | |
| 1991 | → Amora (loan) | | |
| 1991 | → Grêmio (loan) | | |
| 1992–1993 | Vizela | | |
| 1993 | Confiança | | |
| 1994 | Barra do Garças | | |
| 1995 | Madureira | | |
| 1996 | CSA | | |

International career
| 1984 | Brazil | 1 | (0) |
- * Club domestic league appearances and goals as of 20 January 2024

Jorge Baidek (born 16 April 1960), is a Brazilian former professional footballer who played as a centre-back.

== Career ==
Revealed at Grêmio, he played a large part in his career at the club, becoming champion of the Copa Libertadores and Intercontinental Cup in 1983. He also played for clubs in Portugal, especially CF Belenenses.

== International career ==
Baidek made a single appearance for the Brazil national team, 26 June 1984, against Uruguay.

== Personal life ==
After retiring from football, he became an agent for players, such as Diego Ribas. In 2012 he was involved in a car accident in Porto Alegre, with no fatalities.

== Honours ==
Grêmio

- Intercontinental Cup: 1983
- Copa Libertadores: 1983
- Campeonato Brasileiro: 1981
- Campeonato Gaúcho: 1985, 1986, 1987

Belenenses

- Taça de Portugal: 1988–89
