= João Marcos (footballer, born 1953) =

Brazilian footballer (1953–2020)

Personal information
- Full name: João Marcos Coelho da Silva
- Date of birth: 1 June 1953
- Place of birth: Botucatu, Brazil
- Date of death: 2 April 2020 (aged 66)
- Place of death: Botucatu, Brazil
- Position: Goalkeeper

Senior career*
Years	Team	Apps	(Gls)
1973–1974	Guarani FC		
1975	São Bento		
1976–1978	Noroeste		
1979	América (SP)		
1980–1983	Palmeiras		
1984–1985	Grêmio		

International career
1984	Brazil	1	(0)
- * Club domestic league appearances and goals

João Marcos Coelho da Silva (1 June 1953 – 2 April 2020) was a Brazilian footballer who played as a goalkeeper.

== Career ==
Born in Botucatu, João Marcos played club football for Guarani, São Bento, Noroeste, América de Rio Preto, Palmeiras and Grêmio.

He earned 1 cap for the Brazil national team in 1984.

== Later life and death ==
He died in a hospital in Botucatu on 2 April 2020, aged 66, from esophageal disease.
