= Néstor Montelongo =

Uruguayan footballer (1955–2021)

Personal information
- Full name: Néstor Mario Montelongo
- Date of birth: 20 February 1955
- Place of birth: Montevideo, Uruguay
- Date of death: 10 May 2021 (aged 66)
- Positions: Right back; striker

Senior career*
| Years | Team | Apps | (Gls) |
| 1973–1978 | Colón | | |
| 1979–1981 | Montevideo Wanderers | | |
| 1982–1984 | Peñarol | | |
| 1985–1986 | Nacional | | |
| 1986–1987 | Racing | | |
- Bella Vista

International career
| 1979–1985 | Uruguay | 36 | (0) |
Medal record
Representing Uruguay
Copa América
| Winner | 1983 |
CONMEBOL–UEFA Cup of Champions
| Runner-up | 1985 France |
- * Club domestic league appearances and goals

Néstor Mario Montelongo (20 February 1955 – 10 May 2021) was an Uruguayan footballer who played as a right back and striker.

== Career ==
Born in Montevideo, Montelongo played club football for Colón, Montevideo Wanderers, Peñarol, Nacional, Racing and Bella Vista. He began his career as a striker, before being converted to a right back with Wanderers.

He also earned 36 caps for the Uruguay national team between 1979 and 1985, winning the 1983 Copa América.

== Personal life ==
After returning to Uruguay from Argentina, he set up a textiles business.

He died on 10 May 2021, aged 66.
