= Renato Gaúcho =

Brazilian football manager (born 1962)

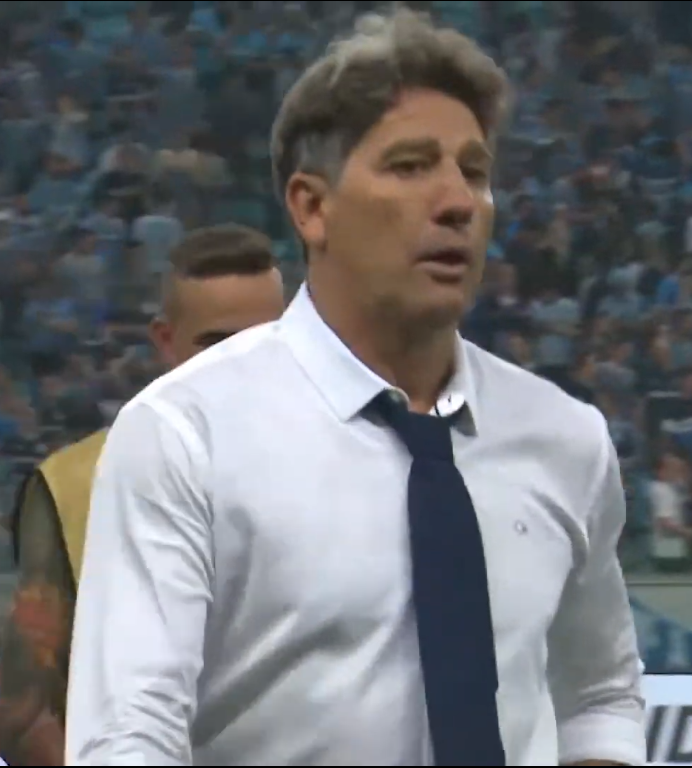
- Renato in 2017

Personal information
- Full name: Renato Portaluppi
- Date of birth: 9 September 1962 (age 64)
- Place of birth: Guaporé, Rio Grande do Sul, Brazil
- Height: 1.84 m (6 ft 0 in)
- Position: Forward

Team information
- Current team: Grêmio (head coach)

Youth career
- 1978–1979: Esportivo
- 1980–1981: Grêmio

Senior career*
Years	Team	Apps	(Gls)
1980–1986	Grêmio	146	(45)
1987–1988	Flamengo	54	(9)
1988–1989	Roma	23	(0)
1989–1990	Flamengo	45	(14)
1991–1992	Botafogo	44	(17)
1991	→ Grêmio (loan)	15	(1)
1992	Cruzeiro	9	(11)
1993	Flamengo	18	(8)
1994	Atlético Mineiro	32	(6)
1995–1997	Fluminense	59	(24)
1997–1998	Flamengo	20	(5)
1999	Bangu	2	(0)
Total		467	(142)

International career
1983–1993	Brazil	41	(5)

Managerial career
- 1996: Fluminense (interim)
- 1996: Fluminense (interim)
- 2001: Madureira
- 2002–2003: Fluminense
- 2003: Fluminense
- 2005–2007: Vasco da Gama
- 2007–2008: Fluminense
- 2008: Vasco da Gama
- 2009: Fluminense
- 2010: Bahia
- 2010–2011: Grêmio
- 2011: Atlético Paranaense
- 2013: Grêmio
- 2014: Fluminense
- 2016–2021: Grêmio
- 2021: Flamengo
- 2022–2024: Grêmio
- 2025: Fluminense
- 2026: Vasco da Gama
- 2026–: Grêmio
- * Club domestic league appearances and goals

Renato Portaluppi (born 9 September 1962), known as Renato Gaúcho or just Renato, is a Brazilian professional football coach and former player. He is the current head coach of Campeonato Brasileiro Série A club Grêmio.

Formerly a right winger, Renato is known for his wins at the Intercontinental Cup in 1983 as a player for Grêmio, his two Copa Libertadores one as Grêmio player in 1983 and one in 2017 as Grêmio coach, his 1989 Copa América as player for Brazil, and mainly being known for "Rei do Rio" (King of Rio de Janeiro). When in the heat of Brazilian national soccer, he won the Campeonato Carioca of 1995 and won the prize given by the press for being the MVP in the championship and giving the title to Fluminense when beating some of the best Brazilian players at the time, Romário (Flamengo), Túlio Maravilha (Botafogo), Valdir Bigode (Vasco).

== Playing career ==
=== Club ===
Renato was born in Guaporé in the state of Rio Grande do Sul. His nickname Gaúcho is the demonym for someone from Rio Grande do Sul, a state known for its gauchos. Renato started his career in Esportivo in Bento Gonçalves where he grew up. He was later signed with Grêmio, where in 1983 he won the Copa Libertadores, beating Peñarol of Uruguay, and the Intercontinental Cup, beating Hamburger SV of Germany, and scoring twice, this way consolidating Grêmio as one of the giants of Brazilian soccer, when they won their first and only world title.

In 1987, he moved to Flamengo and won the Brasileirão Série A in the same year. Then, in 1988, Renato moved abroad, signing with Roma. However, he failed to settle in Italy and returned to Flamengo after one disappointing season, in time to win one more trophy, the Copa do Brasil in 1990.

Renato's career in Fluminense is generally associated with his "belly goal" (a shot from teammate Ailton deflected off his torso into the net) in the 87th minute of the final of the 1995 Campeonato Carioca against Flamengo, in the year that Flamengo celebrated 100 years. With his goal, he was crowned the "King of Rio" of the year. In the same year, he led Fluminense to the semi-finals of the Brasileirão Série A.

Before his retirement in Bangu, he played again for Flamengo, where with all his four passages total he played 210 games, scoring 64 goals for the red and black team.

=== International ===
Renato appeared 41 times for the Brazil national team, scoring five goals.

In 1986, while preparing for the FIFA World Cup Finals in Mexico, Renato was dropped from the squad by coach Telê Santana for disciplinary reasons when he and his friend, who also played at Brazil's national team Leandro returned to the hotel where the team was staying past curfew. Renato was remembered for being a loyal friend when it happened because he could jump over the hotel wall and get in unnoticed, but Leandro could not, so he walked through the main door with him. Leandro was a key player on the squad, so he still got called up for the finals, but not Renato. In return for Renato's gesture of friendship and out of a sense of camaraderie, Leandro said he would not play if Renato were not accepted back. Santana would not budge and reinstate Renato, so Leandro made good on his word and left the squad. Leandro's replacement at right-back was Edson, who was injured in the second World Cup match and was then replaced by the relatively unknown Josimar of Botafogo, who became one of the stars of the tournament.

Renato would go on to be called by Sebastião Lazaroni for the Brazil squad that won the 1989 Copa América, and later for the 1990 FIFA World Cup. He also played in the 1991 Copa América, under Paulo Roberto Falcão.

== Managerial career ==
=== Early years ===
In 1996, while recovering from a knee injury, Renato was an interim manager of Fluminense on two occasions. As the club struggled to remain outside the relegation zone, Renato "promised to walk naked in the Ipanema beach" if the club suffered relegation, which did occur after they finished in the penultimate place; however, a match-fixing scandal canceled the relegations shortly after, which kept Fluminense in the first division.

Renato's whole managerial experience occurred in 2001, as he took over Madureira.

=== Fluminense ===
Between 2 September 2002 and 11 July 2003, and between 1 October 2003 and 28 December 2003, Renato was coach of Fluminense.

=== Vasco da Gama ===
From July 2005 to April 2007, Renato was Vasco da Gama's coach.

=== Fluminense return ===
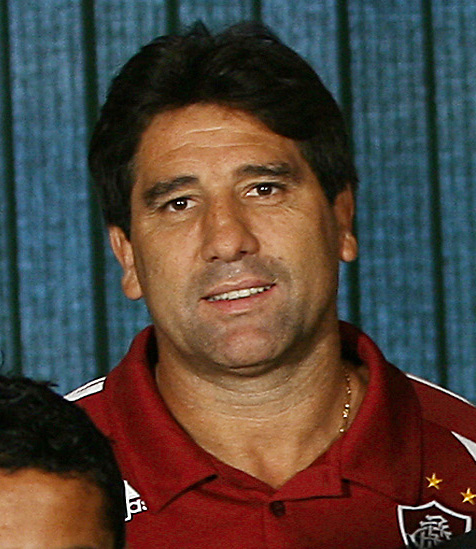
Renato as head coach of Fluminense in 2007

In April 2007, he returned to Fluminense as a manager. On 6 June 2007, he won the Brazilian Cup with Fluminense, his first trophy as a manager. However, he failed to win the Copa Libertadores as Fluminense was defeated in a penalty shootout to underdogs LDU from Ecuador in the final.

On 10 August 2008, Renato was sacked as manager of Flu, following a 2–1 defeat to the Brasileirão's bottom side, Ipatinga which left them joint-bottom of the table.

=== Vasco da Gama return ===
On 18 September 2008, he was hired as Vasco's manager. He left after the club's relegation, in December.

=== Fourth spell at Fluminense ===
Fluminense reappointed Renato on 21 July 2009 to replace Carlos Alberto Parreira. Renato returned for a fourth stint, having already coached Fluminense twice (in 2002–2003, 2003 and again in 2007–2008). On 1 September 2009, Fluminense dismissed him following a series of poor results.

=== Bahia ===
On 13 December 2009, Renato was named manager of Bahia for the 2010 season, in the place of Paulo Bonamigo.

=== Grêmio ===
On 10 August 2010, Grêmio confirmed Renato was their new coach, two days after the sacking of their former coach, Silas. He tried to start a good season, but in his debut, the team lost to Goiás and was eliminated from the 2010 Copa Sudamericana on the Second Stage. In the 2010 Brazilian League, Grêmio ended in 4th place and consequently qualified to 2011 Copa Libertadores. Afterward, Renato did not have a great season in 2011. His team lost the 2011 Campeonato Gaúcho finals to their rival Internacional and was the runner-up. Grêmio was also eliminated from the 2011 Copa Libertadores in the Round of 16, losing to Chilean club Universidad Católica. All of that disappointed himself and Grêmio's President Paulo Odone. He coached some matches of the 2011 Brazilian League. However, their performance wasn't good, and Renato resigned on 30 June.

=== Atlético Paranaense ===
On 4 July 2011, Renato was announced as head coach of Atlético Paranaense. He resigned on 1 September, alleging family reasons.

=== Grêmio return ===
Even after two years without coaching any club, Renato was the first choice of Fábio Koff, president of Grêmio, to succeed Vanderlei Luxemburgo as the new coach of Grêmio. On 2 July 2013, the coach signed with the club and was presented to more than 5,000 supporters in Grêmio Arena.

Renato left Grêmio in December 2013, after failing to agree to a new contract.

=== Fifth spell at Fluminense ===
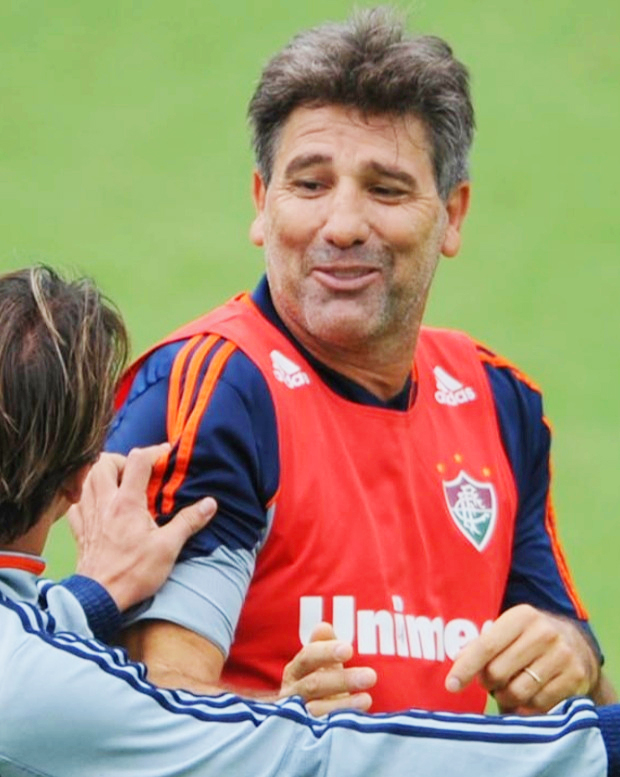
Renato managing Fluminense in 2014

Renato returned to Flu on 24 December 2013. He was dismissed the following 2 April, after being knocked out in the 2014 Campeonato Carioca.

=== Third spell at Grêmio ===
In September 2016, Renato returned to Grêmio in the place of Roger Machado. In the following year, Grêmio had a great campaign in Libertadores Group Stage, and classification as the first of its group, Grêmio played against Godoy Cruz (16th), Botafogo (8th), Barcelona de Guayaquil (4th). In the last year that the final was played in the two teams' stadium (2018 the last game of final was played in Spain and in 2019 the rule was changed and the finals now are played in just one game, as Champions League is), Grêmio won in an emotional 1-0 in Arena do Grêmio and in the 2nd game against Lanús at Estádio La fortaleza Grêmio won by 2-1 and became a Libertadores Champion for the 3rd time.

In the 2018 season, he helped his team to win the Recopa Sudamericana over Independiente and the Campeonato Gaúcho over Brasil de Pelotas, their first win since 2010.

Renato helped Grêmio to win the Campeonato Gaúcho in the 2019 and 2020 campaigns while also having a statue of him inaugurated near the Arena do Grêmio in March 2019. On 15 April 2021, after being knocked out in the first stages of the 2021 Copa Libertadores, he was sacked by the club after more than four years in charge; he was the longest-serving manager in all the four divisions of Brazilian football.

=== Flamengo ===
Following his sacking by Grêmio, Flamengo hired Renato on 10 July 2021, having previously played for them as a player across four separate stints. He signed a contract until the end of the season.

Renato won his first six matches in charge of the club, averaging four goals per match. On 29 September, he helped his side to reach the 2021 Copa Libertadores Final, after defeating Barcelona SC 4–0 on aggregate.

Flamengo's good form did not last long under Renato's guidance. After the club lost the Libertadores Final to Palmeiras, he left on a mutual agreement on 29 November 2021.

=== Fourth spell at Grêmio ===
On 1 September 2022, Renato returned to Grêmio, again replacing sacked Roger Machado. He won two more Campeonato Gaúcho during his fourth spell, being the coach for five of the team's historical seven-year title streak through 2018 to 2024. With the 2024 title, he also became the coach with the most titles in Grêmio's history, alongside Oswaldo Rolla.

On 9 December 2024, Grêmio announced Renato's departure, as his contract would not be renewed.

=== Sixth spell at Fluminense ===
On 3 April 2025, Renato was appointed head coach of Fluminense, signing a contract until the end of the year; it was his seventh coaching spell at the club, the sixth as an official head coach. On 23 September 2025, he resigned after being eliminated by Lanús in the Copa Sudamericana; heavily criticized by the supporters after the substitutions during the second half of the game, he announced his departure in the post-match conference, and the club confirmed his resignation hours later.

=== Third spell at Vasco da Gama ===
On 3 March 2026, Vasco announced the return of Renato as a head coach, on a contract until the end of the year. On 18 June, after just one win in his last six matches in charge, he left by mutual consent.

=== Fifth spell at Grêmio ===
On 14 September 2026, Grêmio announced Renato's return for his fifth spell as head coach.

== Career statistics ==
=== Club ===
Appearances and goals by club, season and competition
Club	Season	League			State League		Cup		Continental		Other		Total	
Club	Season	Division	Apps	Goals	Apps	Goals	Apps	Goals	Apps	Goals	Apps	Goals	Apps	Goals
Grêmio	1980	Série A	0	0	2	0	—		—		—		2	0
Grêmio	1981	Série A	0	0	1	0	—		—		—		1	0
Grêmio	1982	Série A	3	0	28	7	—		6 (Note: Appearance(s) in Copa Libertadores)	0	5 (Note: Appearance(s) in Torneio dos Campeões)	0	42	7
Grêmio	1983	Série A	11	4	13	6	—		12	2	1 (Note: Appearance(s) in Intercontinental Cup)	2	37	14
Grêmio	1984	Série A	20	5	22	10	—		7	2	—		49	17
Grêmio	1985	Série A	10	4	9	3	—		—		—		19	7
Grêmio	1986	Série A	19	2	8	4	—		—		—		27	6
Grêmio	Total		63	15	83	30	—		25	4	6	2	177	51
Flamengo	1987	Série A	19	2	15	2	—		—		—		34	4
Flamengo	1988	Série A	0	0	20	5	—		—		2 (Note: Appearance(s) in Supercopa Libertadores)	1	22	6
Flamengo	Total		19	2	35	7	—		—		2	1	56	10
Roma	1988–89	Serie A	23	0	—		6	3	3 (Note: Appearance(s) in UEFA Cup)	1	1 (Note: Appearance(s) in Serie A qualification play-offs)	0	33	4
Flamengo	1989	Série A	11	1	—		—		—		—		11	1
Flamengo	1990	Série A	16	7	18	6	6	1	—		1	1	41	15
Flamengo	Total		27	8	18	6	6	1	—		1	1	52	16
Botafogo	1991	Série A	16	4	6	7	4	3	—		—		26	14
Botafogo	1992	Série A	22	6	0	0	—		—		—		22	6
Botafogo	Total		38	10	6	7	4	3	—		—		48	20
Grêmio (loan)	1991	Série A	—		15	3	—		—		3 (Note: Two appearances and one goal in Supercopa Sudamericana, one appearance in Copa dos Campeões Mundiais)	1	18	4
Cruzeiro	1992	Série A	—		9	11	—		—		8	6	17	17
Flamengo	1993	Série A	12	4	6	4	1	1	3	1	11 (Note: five appearances and six goals in Torneio Rio – São Paulo, six appearances and four goals in Supercopa Libertadores)	10	33	20
Atlético Mineiro	1994	Série A	14	2	18	4	5	4	—		—		37	10
Fluminense	1995	Série A	15	4	21	5	—		—		—		36	9
Fluminense	1996	Série A	0	0	16	14	3	2	—		—		19	16
Fluminense	1997	Série A	0	0	7	1	1	0	—		—		8	1
Fluminense	Total		15	4	44	20	4	2	—		—		63	26
Flamengo	1997	Série A	12	5	—		—		—		3	1	15	6
Flamengo	1998	Série A	0	0	8	0	1	0	—		—		9	0
Flamengo	Total		12	5	8	0	1	0	—		3	1	24	6
Bangu	1999	Série C	0	0	2	0	—		—		—		2	0
Career total			223	50	244	92	27	14	31	6	35	22	560	184

=== International ===
Appearances and goals by national team and year
National team	Year	Apps	Goals
Brazil	1983	6	1
Brazil	1984	2	0
Brazil	1985	5	0
Brazil	1986	3	0
Brazil	1987	0	0
Brazil	1988	0	0
Brazil	1989	7	0
Brazil	1990	1	0
Brazil	1991	9	2
Brazil	1992	7	2
Brazil	1993	1	0
Total		41	5

Scores and results list Brazil's goal tally first, score column indicates score after each Renato Gaúcho goal.

List of international goals scored by Renato Gaúcho
No.	Date	Venue	Opponent	Score	Result	Competition	Ref.
1	1 September 1983	Estádio Serra Dourada, Goiânia, Brazil	Ecuador	1–0	5–0	1983 Copa América	
2	27 March 1991	José Amalfitani Stadium, Buenos Aires, Argentina	Argentina	1–0	3–3	Friendly	
3	19 July 1991	Estadio Nacional, Santiago, Chile	Colombia	1–0	2–0	1991 Copa América	
4	31 July 1992	Los Angeles Memorial Coliseum, Los Angeles, United States	Mexico	2–0	5–0	1992 Amistad Cup	
5	23 September 1992	Estádio Municipal Rubens Felippe, Paranavaí, Brazil	Costa Rica	4–2	4–2	Friendly	

== Managerial statistics ==
As of 18 November 2026

Managerial record by team and tenure
Team	Nat.	From	To	Record								Ref
Team	Nat.	From	To	G	W	D	L	GF	GA	GD	Win %	Ref
Fluminense (interim)	(Brazil)	6 September 1996	14 September 1996	3	1	0	2	2	9	−7	33.33	
Fluminense (interim)	(Brazil)	7 November 1996	24 November 1996	4	2	0	2	7	7	+0	50.00	
Madureira	(Brazil)	January 2001	May 2001	16	5	2	9	27	42	−15	31.25	
Fluminense	(Brazil)	2 September 2002	11 July 2003	59	26	13	20	102	89	+13	44.07	
Fluminense	(Brazil)	1 October 2003	28 December 2003	13	5	3	5	17	24	−7	38.46	
Vasco da Gama	(Brazil)	18 July 2005	13 April 2007	111	46	35	30	206	168	+38	41.44	
Fluminense	(Brazil)	24 April 2007	11 August 2008	96	44	26	26	163	110	+53	45.83	
Vasco da Gama	(Brazil)	18 September 2008	7 December 2008	13	4	2	7	17	26	−9	30.77	
Fluminense	(Brazil)	20 July 2009	1 September 2009	12	1	5	6	9	15	−6	8.33	
Bahia	(Brazil)	13 December 2009	10 August 2010	49	27	10	12	81	57	+24	55.10	
Grêmio	(Brazil)	10 August 2010	30 June 2011	66	34	16	16	126	77	+49	51.52	
Atlético Paranaense	(Brazil)	4 July 2011	1 September 2011	14	4	5	5	18	17	+1	28.57	
Grêmio	(Brazil)	2 July 2013	17 December 2013	39	17	12	10	39	33	+6	43.59	
Fluminense	(Brazil)	24 December 2013	2 April 2014	18	9	5	4	33	21	+12	50.00	
Grêmio	(Brazil)	18 September 2016	15 April 2021	308	161	82	65	473	233	+240	52.27	
Flamengo	(Brazil)	10 July 2021	29 November 2021	38	25	8	5	88	32	+56	65.79	
Grêmio	(Brazil)	1 September 2022	9 December 2024	138	70	29	39	214	155	+59	50.72	
Fluminense	(Brazil)	3 April 2025	24 September 2025	40	21	8	11	58	39	+19	52.50	
Vasco da Gama	(Brazil)	3 March 2026	18 June 2026	21	9	5	7	33	31	+2	42.86	
Grêmio	(Brazil)	14 September 2026	present	10	3	5	2	11	10	+1	30.00	
Career total				1,068	514	271	283	1,724	1,195	+529	48.13	—

== Honours ==
=== Player ===
Grêmio

- Intercontinental Cup: 1983
- Copa Libertadores: 1983
- Campeonato Brasileiro Série A: 1981
- Campeonato Gaúcho: 1985, 1986

Flamengo

- Campeonato Brasileiro Série A: 1987
- Copa do Brasil: 1990

Cruzeiro

- Supercopa Libertadores: 1992
- Campeonato Mineiro: 1992

Fluminense

- Campeonato Carioca: 1995

Brazil

- Copa América: 1989

Individual

- Intercontinental Cup – Man of the Match: 1983
- Bola de Ouro: 1987
- Bola de Prata: 1984, 1987, 1990, 1992, 1995
- South American Team of the Year: 1992

=== Manager ===
Fluminense

- Copa do Brasil: 2007

Grêmio

- Copa do Brasil: 2016
- Copa Libertadores: 2017
- Campeonato Gaúcho: 2018, 2019, 2020, 2023, 2024
- Recopa Sudamericana: 2018
- Recopa Gaúcha: 2019, 2023

Individual

- Copa Libertadores Best Manager: 2017
- Campeonato Gaúcho Best Manager: 2018, 2019
- IFFHS CONMEBOL Best Club Coach: 2021
- Campeonato Brasileiro Série A Head Coach of the Month: June 2023

== See also ==
- List of football managers with the most matches
