= Canoas Futebol Clube =

Brazilian football club

Canoas
- Full name: Canoas Futebol Clube
- Founded: April 4, 1957
- Dissolved: 2003; 23 years ago
- Ground: Estádio Franscisco Novelleto Neto; Canoas, Brazil
- Capacity: 10,081
- Chairman: -
- Manager: -
- League: -
- 2007: -
Home colours	Away colours

Canoas Futebol Clube, also known simply as Canoas is a football team of Canoas, Rio Grande do Sul, Brazil. Its mascot is a lion.

== Honours ==
- Campeonato Gaúcho Série B
  - Runners-up (1): 1999
