= 1983 Campeonato Ecuatoriano de Fútbol Serie A =

Campeonato Ecuatoriano de Fútbol
- Season: 1983
- Champions: El Nacional
- Relegated: Everest
- Copa Libertadores: El Nacional; 9 de Octubre
- Matches: 298
- Goals: 853 (2.86 per match)

The 1983 Campeonato Ecuatoriano de Fútbol de la Serie A was the 25th national championship for football teams in Ecuador.

== Teams ==
The number of teams for this season was played by 14 teams.

Club	City
9 de Octubre	Guayaquil
América de Quito	Quito
Aucas	Quito
Barcelona	Guayaquil
Deportivo Cuenca	Cuenca
Deportivo Quevedo	Quevedo
Deportivo Quito	Quito
El Nacional	Quito
Emelec	Guayaquil
Everest	Guayaquil
LDU Portoviejo	Portoviejo
LDU Quito	Quito
Manta	Manta
Técnico Universitario	Ambato
Universidad Católica	Quito

== First stage ==
Pos	Team	Pld	W	D	L	GF	GA	GD	Pts	Qualification or relegation
1	El Nacional	26	17	2	7	62	25	+37	36	Qualified to the Liguilla Final
2	9 de Octubre	26	15	3	8	43	34	+9	33	Qualified to the Liguilla Final
3	LDU Portoviejo	26	13	5	8	45	34	+11	31	Qualified to the Liguilla Final
4	Barcelona	26	13	4	9	34	24	+10	30	
5	Manta	26	13	3	10	41	39	+2	29	
6	LDU Quito	26	10	7	9	48	34	+14	27	
7	Técnico Universitario	26	13	1	12	40	36	+4	27	
8	Emelec	26	9	8	9	30	32	−2	26	
9	Universidad Católica	26	9	7	10	31	31	0	25	
10	Aucas	26	9	6	11	38	44	−6	24	
11	Deportivo Quito	26	7	8	11	31	48	−17	22	
12	Deportivo Quevedo	26	7	7	12	22	30	−8	21	
13	América de Quito	26	8	4	14	32	44	−12	20	
14	Everest	26	4	5	17	25	67	−42	13	

Source: RSSSF - 1983 Serie A

== Second stage ==
Pos	Team	Pld	W	D	L	GF	GA	GD	Pts	Qualification or relegation
1	Barcelona	14	8	2	4	23	11	+12	18	Qualified to the Liguilla Final
2	El Nacional	14	7	2	5	17	12	+5	16	Qualified to the Liguilla Final
3	Técnico Universitario	14	7	1	6	24	23	+1	15	Qualified to the Liguilla Final
4	Manta	14	5	4	5	19	18	+1	14	
5	LDU Quito	14	5	4	5	16	17	−1	14	
6	LDU Portoviejo	14	6	2	6	18	25	−7	14	
7	9 de Octubre	14	4	4	6	19	23	−4	12	
8	Emelec	14	2	5	7	20	27	−7	9	

Source: RSSSF - 1983 Serie A

== Liguilla del No Descenso ==
Pos	Team	Pld	W	D	L	GF	GA	GD	Pts	Qualification or relegation
1	Deportivo Quito	10	5	4	1	14	8	+6	14	
2	Universidad Católica	10	5	3	2	12	9	+3	13	
3	Aucas	10	3	4	3	16	12	+4	10	
4	América de Quito	10	3	3	4	13	13	0	9	
5	Deportivo Quevedo	10	3	1	6	10	16	−6	7	
6	Everest	10	2	3	5	6	13	−7	7	Relegated to the Serie B

Source: RSSSF - 1983 Serie A

== Liguilla Final ==
Pos	Team	Pld	W	D	L	GF	GA	GD	Pts	Qualification
1	El Nacional (Note: El Nacional were awarded three points.) (C)	10	5	2	3	21	13	+8	15	1984 Copa Libertadores
2	9 de Octubre (Note: 9 de Octubre were awarded one point.)	10	5	2	3	14	14	0	13	1984 Copa Libertadores
3	Barcelona (Note: Barcelona were awarded two points.)	10	4	2	4	18	16	+2	12	
4	LDU Portoviejo	10	5	0	5	16	13	+3	10	
5	Técnico Universitario	10	5	0	5	20	23	−3	10	
6	Manta	10	1	4	5	15	25	−10	6	

Source: RSSSF - 1983 Serie A
(C) Champions
Notes:

Campeonato Ecuatoriano de Fútbol
1983 champion
