= Osvaldo (footballer, born 1959) =

Brazilian footballer

Personal information
- Full name: Osvaldo Luiz Vital
- Date of birth: 9 January 1959 (age 67)
- Place of birth: Santa Bárbara d'Oeste, Brazil
- Position: Attacking midfielder

Youth career
- Ponte Preta

Senior career*
Years	Team	Apps	(Gls)
1978–1982	Ponte Preta		
1982–1987	Grêmio	265	(105)
1987	Santos		
1987–1988	Vasco da Gama		
1988–1990	Coritiba		
1990	Comercial-SP		
1991–1992	Ponte Preta		
- * Club domestic league appearances and goals as of 20 January 2024

Osvaldo Luiz Vital (born 9 January 1959), simply known as Osvaldo, is a Brazilian former professional footballer who played as an attacking midfielder.

== Career ==
Formed in the youth sectors of Ponte Preta alongside Carlos Gallo and Edson Boaro, he was a highlight of the club, especially in the 1981 Campeonato Paulista where he was the team's top scorer in the competition. He is the fourth highest scorer in the history of Ponte Preta with 89 goals. With Grêmio, he also made history, being part of the Copa Libertadores and Copa Intercontinental victories in 1983. He also played for Vasco da Gama and Santos in the state championship in 1987. He ended his career at Ponte Preta in 1992.

== Personal life ==
Tired of football, Osvaldo owns an automobile mechanic workshop in his hometown, Santa Bárbara d'Oeste.

== Honours ==
Ponte Preta

- Copa São Paulo de Futebol Jr.: 1981

Grêmio

- Intercontinental Cup: 1983
- Copa Libertadores: 1983
- Campeonato Gaúcho: 1985, 1986

Coritiba

- Campeonato Paranaense: 1989
