= 1984 Copa Libertadores =

25th season of Copa Libertadores

1984 Copa Libertadores de América
Tournament details
- Dates: February 11 – July 27
- Teams: 21 (from 10 associations)

Final positions
- Champions: (Argentina) Independiente (7th title)
- Runners-up: (Brazil) Grêmio

Tournament statistics
- Matches played: 75
- Goals scored: 178 (2.37 per match)

The Copa Libertadores 1984 was the 25th edition of the Copa Libertadores, CONMEBOL's annual international club tournament. Independiente won the competition for their record-extending 7th Copa Libertadores title.

== Qualified teams ==
Country	Team	Qualification method
CONMEBOL (1 berth)	Gremio	1983 Copa Libertadores champion
Argentina (2 berths)	Estudiantes	1983 Nacional champion
Argentina (2 berths)	Independiente	1983 Metropolitano champion
Bolivia (2 berths)	Bolívar	1983 Primera División champion
Bolivia (2 berths)	Blooming	1983 Primera División runner-up
Brazil (2 berths)	Flamengo	1983 Campeonato Brasileiro Série A champion
Brazil (2 berths)	Santos	1983 Campeonato Brasileiro Série A runner-up
Chile (2 berths)	Universidad Católica	1983 Copa Polla Gol champion
Chile (2 berths)	O'Higgins	1983 Copa Polla Gol runner-up
Colombia (2 berths)	América de Cali	1983 Campeonato Profesional champion
Colombia (2 berths)	Junior	1983 Campeonato Profesional runner-up
Ecuador (2 berths)	El Nacional	1983 Campeonato Ecuatoriano champion
Ecuador (2 berths)	9 de Octubre	1983 Campeonato Ecuatoriano runner-up
Paraguay (2 berths)	Olimpia	1983 Primera División champion
Paraguay (2 berths)	Sportivo Luqueño	1983 Primera División runner-up
Peru (2 berths)	Sporting Cristal	1983 Primera División champion
Peru (2 berths)	Melgar	1983 Primera División runner-up
Uruguay (2 berths)	Danubio	1983 Liguilla Pre-Libertadores winner
Uruguay (2 berths)	Nacional	1983 Liguilla Pre-Libertadores runner-up
Venezuela (2 berths)	Universidad de Los Andes	1983 Primera División champion
Venezuela (2 berths)	Portuguesa	1983 Primera División runner-up

== Draw ==
The champions and runners-up of each football association were drawn into the same group along with another football association's participating teams. Three clubs from Brazil competed as Gremio was champion of the 1983 Copa Libertadores. They entered the tournament in the Semifinals.

Group 1	Group 2	Group 3	Group 4	Group 5
Argentina; Paraguay	Bolivia; Chile	Brazil; Colombia	Ecuador; Uruguay	Peru; Venezuela

== Group stage ==
=== Group 1 ===
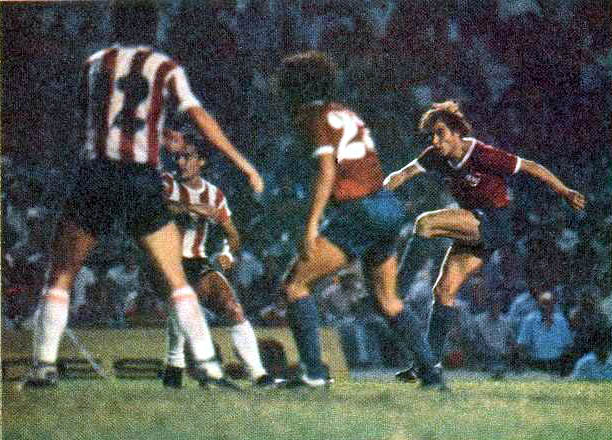
Bochini scoring for Independiente v Estudiantes LP

Pos	Team	Pld	W	D	L	GF	GA	GD	Pts	Qualification	(Argentina) IND	(Paraguay) OLI	(Paraguay) SLU	(Argentina) EST
1	(Argentina) Independiente	6	4	1	1	11	5	+6	9	Semifinals	—	3–2	2–0	4–1
2	(Paraguay) Olimpia	6	4	1	1	8	5	+3	9		1–0	—	0–0	2–1
3	(Paraguay) Sportivo Luqueño	6	0	3	3	2	6	−4	3		0–1	1–2	—	0–0
4	(Argentina) Estudiantes	6	0	3	3	4	9	−5	3		1–1	0–1	1–1	—

=== Group 2 ===
Pos	Team	Pld	W	D	L	GF	GA	GD	Pts	Qualification	(Chile) UC	(Bolivia) BLO	(Bolivia) BOL	(Chile) OHI
1	(Chile) Universidad Católica	6	4	1	1	11	5	+6	9	Semifinals	—	0–0	3–1	2–0
2	(Bolivia) Blooming	6	3	2	1	10	6	+4	8		1–2	—	2–1	3–0
3	(Bolivia) Bolívar	6	2	2	2	10	8	+2	6		3–2	0–0	—	5–1
4	(Chile) O'Higgins	6	0	1	5	4	16	−12	1		0–2	3–4	0–0	—

=== Group 3 ===
Pos	Team	Pld	W	D	L	GF	GA	GD	Pts	Qualification	(Brazil) FLA	(Colombia) AME	(Colombia) JUN	(Brazil) SAN
1	(Brazil) Flamengo	6	5	1	0	19	6	+13	11	Semifinals	—	4–2	3–1	4–1
2	(Colombia) América de Cali	6	3	1	2	8	9	−1	7		1–1	—	2–0	1–0
3	(Colombia) Junior	6	2	0	4	9	12	−3	4		1–2	4–1	—	0–3
4	(Brazil) Santos	6	1	0	5	5	14	−9	2		0–5	0–1	1–3	—

=== Group 4 ===
Pos	Team	Pld	W	D	L	GF	GA	GD	Pts	Qualification	(Uruguay) NAC	(Ecuador) ENA	(Uruguay) DAN	(Ecuador) 9OC
1	(Uruguay) Nacional	6	4	1	1	13	5	+8	9	Semifinals	—	1–1	1–0	6–0
2	(Ecuador) El Nacional	6	3	2	1	12	6	+6	8		3–1	—	3–0	3–1
3	(Uruguay) Danubio	6	2	1	3	8	8	0	5		0–1	1–0	—	5–1
4	(Ecuador) 9 de Octubre	6	0	2	4	7	21	−14	2		1–3	2–2	2–2	—

=== Group 5 ===
Pos	Team	Pld	W	D	L	GF	GA	GD	Pts	Qualification	(Venezuela) ULA	(Peru) SCR	(Venezuela) POR	(Peru) MEL
1	(Venezuela) Universidad de Los Andes	6	4	0	2	6	4	+2	8	Semifinals	—	0–1	2–0	1–0
2	(Peru) Sporting Cristal	6	4	0	2	8	6	+2	8		2–0	—	2–1	3–2
3	(Venezuela) Portuguesa	6	3	0	3	9	7	+2	6		1–2	1–0	—	4–0
4	(Peru) Melgar	6	1	0	5	5	11	−6	2		0–1	2–0	1–2	—

==== Tiebreaker ====
Team 1	Score	Team 2
Universidad de Los Andes (Venezuela)	2–1	(Peru) Sporting Cristal

== Semifinals ==
=== Group 1 ===
Pos	Team	Pld	W	D	L	GF	GA	GD	Pts	Qualification	(Argentina) IND	(Uruguay) NAC	(Chile) UC
1	(Argentina) Independiente	4	2	2	0	4	2	+2	6	Finals	—	1–0	2–1
2	(Uruguay) Nacional	3	1	1	1	3	2	+1	3		1–1	—	2–0
3	(Chile) Universidad Católica	3	0	1	2	1	4	−3	1		0–0	—	—

=== Group 2 ===
Pos	Team	Pld	W	D	L	GF	GA	GD	Pts	Qualification	(Brazil) GRE	(Brazil) FLA	(Venezuela) ULA
1	(Brazil) Gremio	4	3	0	1	14	5	+9	6	Finals	—	5–1	6–1
2	(Brazil) Flamengo	4	3	0	1	9	7	+2	6		3–1	—	2–1
3	(Venezuela) Universidad de Los Andes	4	0	0	4	2	13	−11	0		0–2	0–3	—

==== Tiebreaker ====
- Gremio qualified due to better goal difference in group.

Team 1	Score	Team 2
Gremio (Brazil)	0–0	(Brazil) Flamengo

== Finals ==
Team 1	Agg.	Team 2	1st leg	2nd leg
Grêmio (Brazil)	0–1	(Argentina) Independiente	0–1	0–0
