= China (footballer, born 1959) =

Brazilian footballer

Personal information
- Full name: Henrique Valmir da Conceição
- Date of birth: 13 September 1959 (age 67)
- Place of birth: Espumoso, Brazil
- Position: Midfielder

International career
Years	Team	Apps	(Gls)
1983	Brazil	5	(0)

Henrique Valmir da Conceição (born 13 September 1959), better known as just China, is a Brazilian footballer who played as a midfielder. He played in five matches for the Brazil national football team in 1983. He was also part of Brazil's squad for the 1983 Copa América tournament.

== Honours ==
Gremio

- Copa Libertadores: 1983
