= Mazarópi =

Brazilian footballer (born 1953)

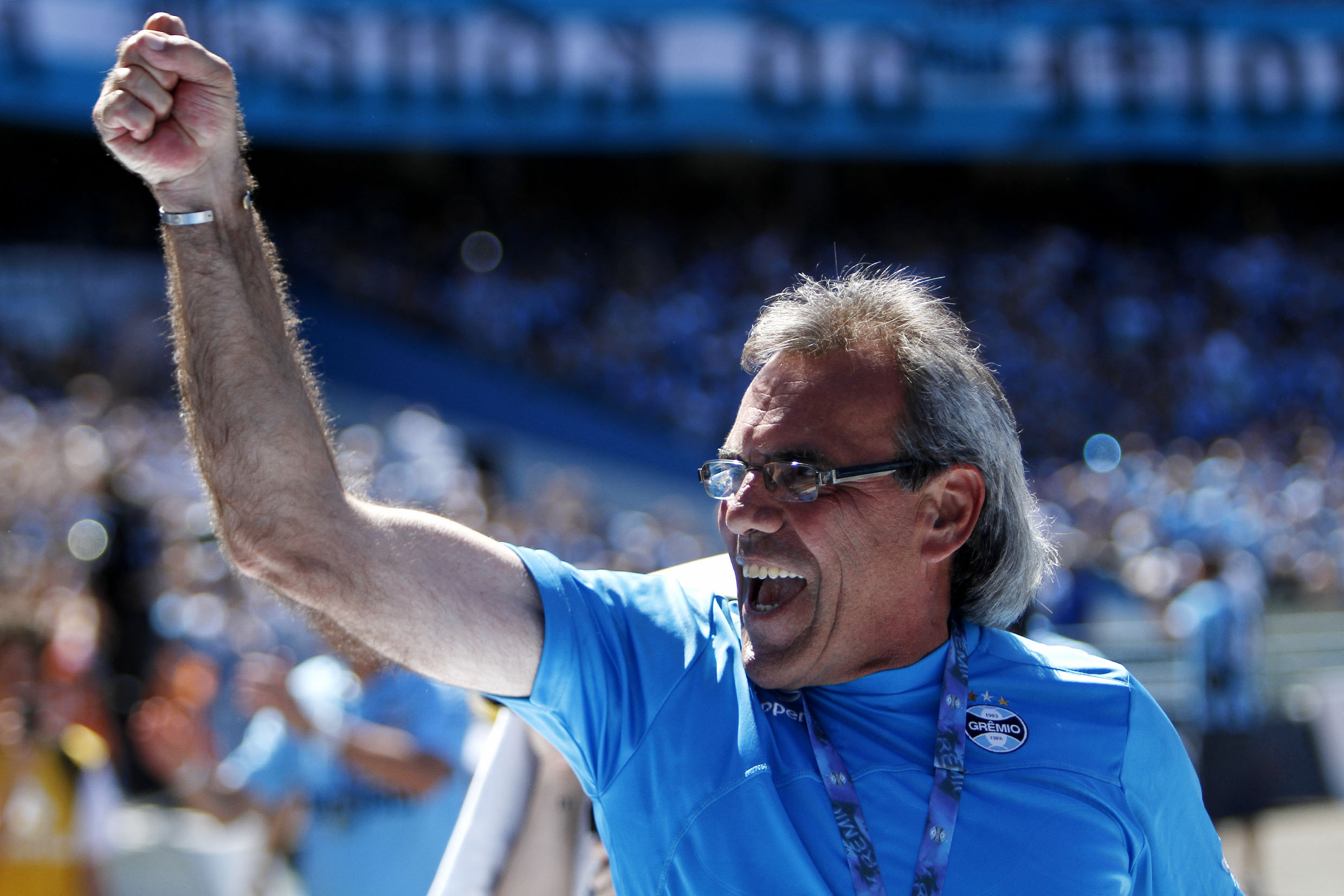

Personal information
- Full name: Geraldo Pereira de Matos Filho
- Date of birth: 27 January 1953 (age 73)
- Place of birth: Além Paraíba, Minas Gerais, Brazil
- Position: Goalkeeper

Team information
- Current team: SER Santo Ângelo

Senior career*
Years	Team	Apps	(Gls)
1970–1984	Vasco da Gama		
1979	→ Coritiba (loan)		
1983	→ Grêmio (loan)		
1984	→ Náutico (loan)		
1985–1990	Grêmio		
1991	Figueirense		
1992	Guarany de Bagé		

Managerial career
- 1999: Nagoya Grampus Eight
- 2005: Sapucaiense
- 2007: Vilhena
- 2007–2008: Guarani (VA)
- 2008–: SER Santo Ângelo
- * Club domestic league appearances and goals

Geraldo Pereira de Matos Filho (born 27 January 1953), nicknamed Mazarópi, is a Brazilian professional football coach and former player who manages SER Santo Ângelo.

A goalkeeper, he holds the world record for the longest time without conceding a goal, with 1,816 minutes.

== Club career ==
Mazarópi played for Vasco da Gama, Coritiba, Grêmio, Náutico, Figueirense and Guarany de Bagé.

== Coaching career ==
Mazarópi has coached Nagoya Grampus, Sapucaiense, Vilhena and Guarani (VA).

== Managerial statistics ==
Team	From	To	Record				
Team	From	To	G	W	D	L	Win %
Nagoya Grampus Eight	1999	1999	2	1	0	1	50.00
Nagoya Grampus Eight	2000	2000	1	1	0	0	100.00
Total			3	2	0	1	66.67
