= 1983 Copa Libertadores =

24th season of Copa Libertadores

1983 Copa Libertadores de América
Tournament details
- Dates: March 3 – July 28
- Teams: 21 (from 10 associations)

Final positions
- Champions: (Brazil) Grêmio (1st title)
- Runners-up: (Uruguay) Peñarol

Tournament statistics
- Matches played: 75
- Goals scored: 184 (2.45 per match)

The Copa Libertadores 1983 was the 24th edition of the Copa Libertadores, CONMEBOL's annual international club tournament. Grêmio won the competition against Peñarol.

== Qualified teams ==
Country	Team	Qualify method
CONMEBOL (1 berth)	Peñarol	1982 Copa Libertadores champion
Argentina; 2 berths	Ferro Carril Oeste	1982 Campeonato Nacional champions
Argentina; 2 berths	Estudiantes	1982 Campeonato Metropolitano champions
Bolivia; 2 berths	Bolivar	1982 Primera División champion
Bolivia; 2 berths	Blooming	1982 Primera División runner-up
Brazil; 2 berths	Flamengo	1982 Campeonato Brasileiro Série A champion
Brazil; 2 berths	Grêmio	1982 Campeonato Brasileiro Série A 2nd place
Chile; 2 berths	Cobreloa	1982 Primera División champion
Chile; 2 berths	Colo-Colo	1982 Liguilla Pre-Copa Libertadores winner
Colombia; 2 berths	América de Cali	1982 Campeonato Profesional champion
Colombia; 2 berths	Deportes Tolima	1982 Campeonato Profesional runner-up
Ecuador; 2 berths	El Nacional	1982 Campeonato Ecuatoriano de Fútbol Serie A champion
Ecuador; 2 berths	Barcelona	1982 Campeonato Ecuatoriano de Fútbol Serie A runner-up
Paraguay; 2 berths	Olimpia	1982 Primera División champion
Paraguay; 2 berths	Nacional	1982 Primera División runner-up
Peru; 2 berths	Universitario	1982 Torneo Descentralizado champion
Peru; 2 berths	Alianza Lima	1982 Torneo Descentralizado runner-up
Uruguay; 2 berths	Nacional	1982 Liguilla Pre-Libertadores winner
Uruguay; 2 berths	Montevideo Wanderers	1982 Liguilla Pre-Libertadores runner-up
Venezuela; 2 berths	San Cristóbal	1982 Primera División champion
Venezuela; 2 berths	Deportivo Táchira	1982 Primera División runner-up

== Draw ==
The champions and runners-up of each football association were drawn into the same group along with another football association's participating teams. Three clubs from Uruguay competed as Peñarol was champion of the 1982 Copa Libertadores. They entered the tournament in the Semifinals.

Group 1	Group 2	Group 3	Group 4	Group 5
Argentina; Chile	Bolivia; Brazil	Colombia; Peru	Ecuador; Venezuela	Paraguay; Uruguay

== Group Stage ==
=== Group 1 ===
Pos	Team	Pld	W	D	L	GF	GA	GD	Pts	Qualification	(Argentina) EST	(Chile) COB	(Chile) COL	(Argentina) FER
1	(Argentina) Estudiantes	6	3	1	2	8	6	+2	7	Semi-finals	—	2–0	4–1	0–0
2	(Chile) Cobreloa	6	3	0	3	8	6	+2	6		3–0	—	2–0	2–1
3	(Chile) Colo-Colo	6	3	0	3	5	8	−3	6		1–0	2–1	—	1–0
4	(Argentina) Ferro Carril Oeste	6	2	1	3	4	5	−1	5		1–2	1–0	1–0	—

=== Group 2 ===
Pos	Team	Pld	W	D	L	GF	GA	GD	Pts	Qualification	(Brazil) GRE	(Brazil) FLA	(Bolivia) BOL	(Bolivia) BLO
1	(Brazil) Grêmio	6	5	1	0	13	4	+9	11	Semi-finals	—	1–1	3–1	2–0
2	(Brazil) Flamengo	6	2	2	2	15	10	+5	6		1–3	—	5–2	7–1
3	(Bolivia) Bolívar	6	2	0	4	13	14	−1	4		1–2	3–1	—	6–0
4	(Bolivia) Blooming	6	1	1	4	4	17	−13	3		0–2	0–0	3–0	—

=== Group 3 ===
Pos	Team	Pld	W	D	L	GF	GA	GD	Pts	Qualification	(Colombia) AME	(Colombia) TOL	(Peru) UNI	(Peru) ALI
1	(Colombia) América de Cali	6	4	2	0	10	3	+7	10	Semi-finals	—	1–1	2–0	2–0
2	(Colombia) Deportes Tolima	6	1	4	1	5	6	−1	6		0–2	—	1–1	0–0
3	(Peru) Universitario	6	0	4	2	5	8	−3	4		1–1	2–2	—	0–0
4	(Peru) Alianza Lima	6	1	2	3	3	6	−3	4		1–2	0–1	2–1	—

=== Group 4 ===
Pos	Team	Pld	W	D	L	GF	GA	GD	Pts	Qualification	(Venezuela) CRI	(Ecuador) NAC	(Ecuador) BAR	(Venezuela) TAC
1	(Venezuela) San Cristóbal	6	3	2	1	8	4	+4	8	Semi-finals	—	1–0	2–0	2–0
2	(Ecuador) El Nacional	6	3	1	2	7	4	+3	7		1–0	—	3–1	3–0
3	(Ecuador) Barcelona	5	1	2	2	7	9	−2	4		3–3	2–0	—	—
4	(Venezuela) Deportivo Táchira	5	0	3	2	1	6	−5	3		0–0	0–0	1–1	—

=== Group 5 ===
Pos	Team	Pld	W	D	L	GF	GA	GD	Pts	Qualification	(Uruguay) NAC	(Uruguay) WAN	(Paraguay) NAP	(Paraguay) OLI
1	(Uruguay) Nacional	6	4	1	1	12	4	+8	9	Semi-finals	—	1–1	4–2	3–0
2	(Uruguay) Montevideo Wanderers	6	3	3	0	9	5	+4	9		1–0	—	3–1	0–0
3	(Paraguay) Nacional	6	1	2	3	6	12	−6	4		0–3	1–1	—	0–0
4	(Paraguay) Olimpia	6	0	2	4	3	9	−6	2		0–1	2–3	1–2	—

==== Tiebreaker ====
Team 1	Score	Team 2
Nacional (Uruguay)	2–1	(Uruguay) Montevideo Wanderers

== Semi-finals ==
=== Group 1 ===
Pos	Team	Pld	W	D	L	GF	GA	GD	Pts	Qualification	(Brazil) GRE	(Argentina) EST	(Colombia) AME
1	(Brazil) Grêmio	4	2	1	1	7	6	+1	5	Finals	—	2–1	2–1
2	(Argentina) Estudiantes	4	1	2	1	6	5	+1	4		3–3	—	2–0
3	(Colombia) América de Cali	4	1	1	2	2	4	−2	3		1–0	0–0	—

=== Group 2 ===
Pos	Team	Pld	W	D	L	GF	GA	GD	Pts	Qualification	(Uruguay) PEÑ	(Uruguay) NAC	(Venezuela) CRI
1	(Uruguay) Peñarol	4	3	1	0	5	1	+4	7	Finals	—	2–0	1–0
2	(Uruguay) Nacional	4	2	0	2	8	6	+2	4		1–2	—	5–1
3	(Venezuela) San Cristóbal	4	0	1	3	2	8	−6	1		0–0	1–2	—

== Finals ==
=== First leg ===
22 July 1983	Peñarol (Uruguay)	1–1	(Brazil) Grêmio	Estadio Centenario, Montevideo

=== Second leg ===
28 July 1983	Grêmio (Brazil)	2–1	(Uruguay) Peñarol	Estádio Olímpico, Porto Alegre

== Champion ==
Copa Libertadores
1983 Winner

Gremio
First Title
