= Argentina–Uruguay football rivalry =

International football rivalry

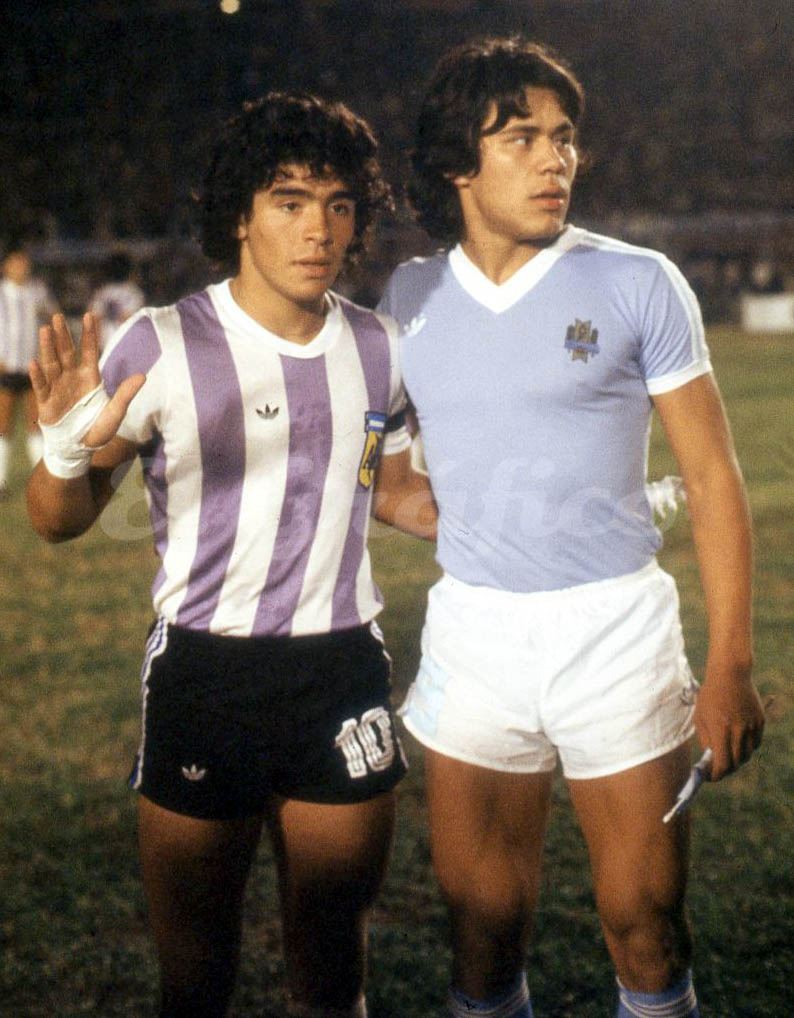
- Diego Maradona and Rubén Paz at the 1979 South American U-20 Championship
- Other names: Clásico del Río de la Plata
- Location: South America
- Teams: Argentina; Uruguay
- First meeting: 20 July 1902; Friendly; Uruguay 0–6 Argentina
- Latest meeting: 14 November 2026; Friendly; Argentina 1–2 Uruguay

Statistics
- Total meetings: 214 (190 official)
- Most wins: Argentina (98) (89 official)
- All-time series: Argentina: 98 (89 official); Draw: 52 (46 official); Uruguay: 65 (51 official)
- Largest victory: Argentina 6–0 Uruguay (20 July 1902)

The Argentina–Uruguay football rivalry, also known as Río de la Plata Derby (Clásico del Rio de la Plata in Spanish) is a highly competitive sports rivalry that exists between the Argentine and Uruguayan national football teams and their respective set of fans. Considered by football journalists and fans alike as one of the most important rivalries in the sport, the derby is also the most played in football history. According to FIFA records, 197 official matches have been played to date, the first of which was played on 20 July 1902; in which both teams played the first international match outside the United Kingdom in Uruguay, with Argentina winning by 6–0.

Games between the two teams, even those that are only friendly matches, are often marked by notable and sometimes controversial incidents. In addition, both national teams have been described as some of the most successful sides in the history of association football; Argentina has won three FIFA World Cups, whereas Uruguay has won two. Argentina have won the Copa América sixteen times (record) against 15 of Uruguay, and the Celestes have won two gold medals at the Olympic Games when it was played by senior teams. The two nations have also seen success in other inter-confederation and youth competitions, and are also routinely ranked among the top national teams in the world in both the FIFA World Rankings and the World Football Elo Ratings. As of 2023, Argentina has won 92 matches, Uruguay has won 59 matches, and 46 matches ended in a draw.

Aside from the national teams, both countries have produced some of the most successful clubs in the world. The Big Five have represented Argentina's success in club football for most of its history, although other clubs have achieved success in recent history as well. In Uruguay, Peñarol and Nacional have predominantly been the most successful clubs in the country ever since the introduction of the sport. In the Copa Libertadores, Argentine clubs have reached the final 38 times, with 25 coming out as champions, whereas Uruguayan clubs have appeared in 16 finals and have won 8 of them. In the Copa Sudamericana, Argentine clubs have been featured 15 times, winning it on 9 occasions. No Uruguayan club, however, has yet reached a Copa Sudamericana final. In all intercontinental competitions, including the Intercontinental Cup and the FIFA Club World Cup, Argentine clubs have won 9 tournaments and were runners-up 14 times, and Uruguayan clubs won 6 tournaments and were runners-up 2 times. In 2009, the International Federation of Football History & Statistics released a series of statistical studies that determined the best continental clubs of the 20th century. For South America, Peñarol was ranked as the greatest football club in the continent. This was followed by Independiente, Nacional, and River Plate in that order. Boca Juniors were ranked sixth overall, although Boca Juniors were ranked as the best South American club for the first decade of the 21st century in 2012.

The two nations have also produced many defining players since their introduction to the sport. This includes but isn't limited to, Uruguay's golden generation from the first half of the 20th century, consisting of the likes of José Leandro Andrade, Alcides Ghiggia, José Nasazzi, and Juan Alberto Schiaffino, to Argentina's international prominence later on with names such as Gabriel Batistuta, Mario Alberto Kempes, Diego Maradona, and Daniel Passarella, and eventually down to modern-day generational talents, including Edinson Cavani, Ángel Di María, Diego Forlan, Lionel Messi, Juan Román Riquelme, and Luis Suárez.

== History ==
=== Background ===
The foundation of the rivalry can be traced to the countries' similarities; both countries' share the same cultures and ethnicities derived from the Viceroyalty of the Río de la Plata from the 18th century, and later on, the influx of European immigration, starting as early as the 19th century, which would eventually establish the modern-day society of Argentina and Uruguay. Amongst the mass immigration included the British, but unlike most immigrants such as from Spain and Italy who were escaping poverty and political turmoil in their homeland, the British were skilled workers, ranchers, businessmen, and bureaucrats. During this time, Argentina and Uruguay were emerging nations and the settlers were welcomed for the stability they brought to commercial life. As a result, the British brought over their customs and traditions, including football. The name of the rivalry is based on their geographical location; the Río de la Plata forms part of the border between Argentina and Uruguay.

The first game was played in Argentina on 20 June 1867, with the establishment of Buenos Aires Football Club, the first football club not only in Argentina, but in South America. In Uruguay, football had been introduced in 1870. Argentina organised its first league championship, Primera División, in 1891 while Uruguay held its first domestic tournament, also named the Primera División, in 1900. The Argentine and Uruguayan Associations were the first national football organisations in South America, developing together the first international competitions in the Río de la Plata, such as Tie Cup (1900) and Copa de Honor Cousenier (1905), played by the champions of each association.

=== 1900-1902: Beginnings; first international football match outside the United Kingdom ===
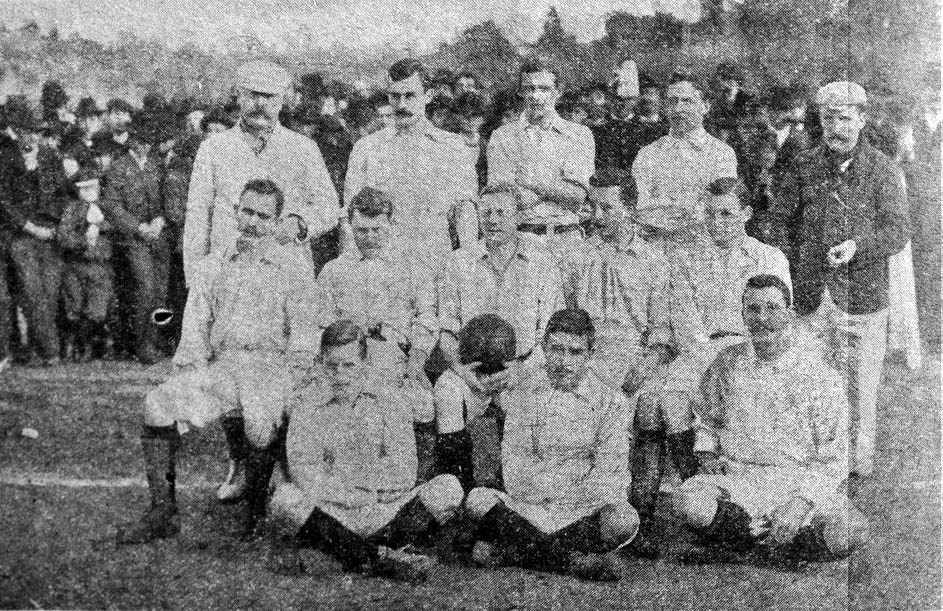
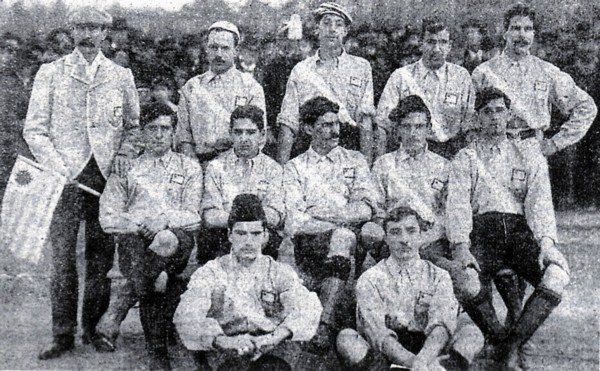
The Argentina (left) and Uruguayan (right) national teams that played the first international football match outside Great Britain in Montevideo on July 20, 1902

Although the first match ever recorded between Argentina and Uruguay was played on 16 May 1901, the match isn't registered as an official game due to the match being organised by the Albion Football Club, not by the Uruguayan Football Association, at the club's home ground in Paso del Molino, Montevideo. The Uruguayan side had nine players from that club and the remainder from Nacional. Argentina won the match 3–2. The first official match was held in the same venue, on 20 July 1902, with Argentina beating Uruguay 6–0.

20 June 1902

Uruguay	0–6	Argentina
		Charles Dickinson 3'; Germán Arímalo 31' (o.g.); Edward Morgan 64'; Carlos Carve Urioste 66' (o.g.); Juan Anderson 71'; Jorge Brown 86'

Estadio del Albion Football Club (Estadio Parque Dr. Enrique Falco Lichtemberger), Paso del Molino
Montevideo, Uruguay
Attendance: 8,000
Referee: Robert Whall Rudd (Argentina)

Players that represented the Argentine squad were from Alumni (5 players), Quilmes (2), Belgrano AC (2), Lomas (1) and Barracas AC (1). For Uruguay, the squad was formed by eight players from Nacional and three from Albion. There were no players from CURCC in Uruguay, as the club didn't allow their players to participate in the match.

=== 1905-1916: First competitions ===
During its first years of existence, both national teams played only friendly matches amongst each other until the establishment of the Copa Lipton in 1905, organized by both Argentine and Uruguayan Football Associations. The trophy had been donated by the Scottish tea magnate Thomas Lipton with the condition that the teams be made up of only native-born players. The tournament was contested on an annual basis between 1905 and 1992. The decade of 1910 is considered "the golden age" of the competition, due to Argentina and Uruguay were the predominant teams in South America by then and the Copa Lipton was the most important competition for both sides, considering that CONMEBOL had not been established until 1916. The first official title won by Argentina was the 1906 Copa Lipton, defeating Uruguay 2–0 in Montevideo. Throughout the duration of the competition, Argentina won the title 17 times, whereas Uruguay won it 11 times.

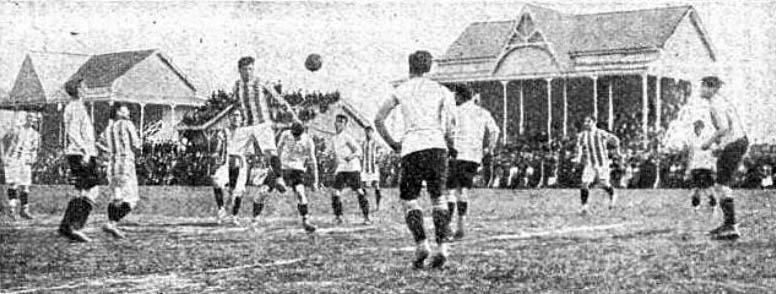
The 1912 edition of the Copa Lipton match being played at the Estadio Racing Club in Buenos Aires

Other notable competition for both sides was the Copa Newton, also established in 1906 and continued on an annual basis until 1930. Similar to the Copa Lipton, Nicanor Newton, director of Sportsman magazine, a former Argentine-based sports magazine company, donated the trophy for a competition which would be held for beneficial purposes. Argentina won the first edition as well, defeating Uruguay 2–1 at the Sociedad Sportiva Argentina in Buenos Aires. It has only been played sporadically since, with the last edition being contested in 1976. Argentina and Uruguay have also won the tournament 17 and 11 times, respectively.

Apart from Copa Lipton and Copa Newton, two other competitions were established, with the particularity of each one being hosted in each side of the Río del Plata. The Copa Premier Honor Argentino was held in Buenos Aires (1908–1920) while the Copa Premier Honor Uruguayo (1911–1924) was held in Montevideo.

In 1910, the Argentine Football Association organized the Copa Centenario Revolución de Mayo in honor of the centennial anniversary of the May Revolution in Argentina. The competition is notable for being the first international tournament of South America where more than two football nations participated and is also considered a predecessor to Copa América. Participating teams featured the Argentine, Uruguayan, and Chilean national teams. Formtted in a round-robin system, all three games were played in Buenos Aires; the first match was played in Cancha de Colegiales and the Estadio Gimnasia y Esgrima de Buenos Aires. Because of having featured three of the subsequent four founding members of CONMEBOL, the Copa Centenario Revolución de Mayo was sometimes called "the first Copa América". However, CONMEBOL recognizes the 1916 South American Championship as the first edition of the competition.

=== 1916: Inauguration of the Copa América ===
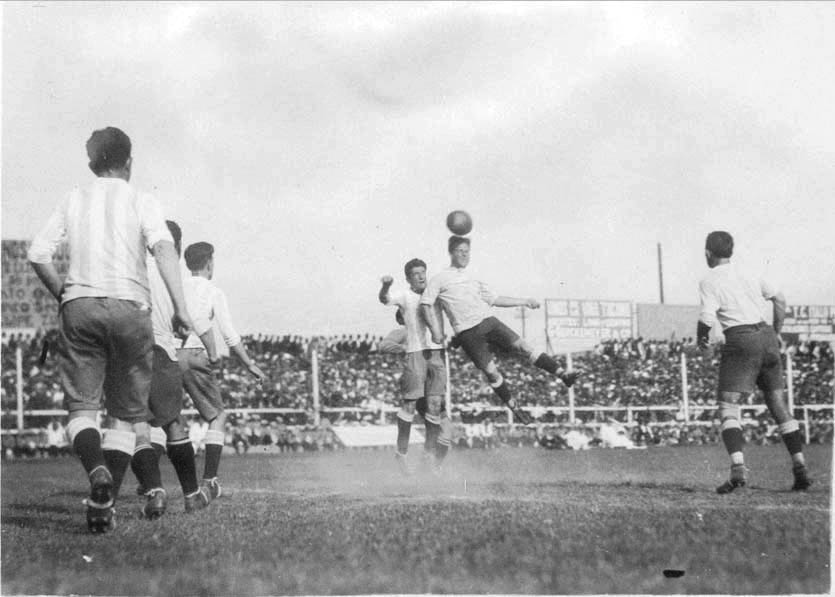
Argentina playing against Uruguay at Estadio Nacional del Perú during the 1927 South American Championship on 20 November 1927

Six years after the Copa Cenenario Revolución de Mayo, the first edition of the "Campeonato Sudamericano de Fútbol" (South American Football Championship), later known as the "Copa América", was contested in Argentina to commemorate the centenary of the Argentine Declaration of Independence. As a result, the four participating associations of the tournament (Argentina, Brazil, Chile, and Uruguay) gathered in Buenos Aires in order to officially create a governing body to facilitate the organization of the tournament. A week after the start of the tournament, on 9 July 1916, the continental governing body of football in South America, CONMEBOL, was founded under initiative of Uruguayan Héctor Rivadavia Gómez with the approval of the four associations. The first Constitutional Congress on 15 December of that same year, which took place in Montevideo, ratified the decision.

Hosted in the Estadio Gimnasia y Esgrima de Buenos Aires and the Estadio Racing Club in Buenos Aires, six matches were played; each team played one match against each of the other teams. Two points were awarded for a win, one point for a draw and zero points for a defeat. Uruguay and Argentina met in the final match of the tournament at Racing Club on 17 July 1916, with the match ending in a goalless draw. Uruguay would win the first continental trophy with five points, whereas Argentina came second with four points. Despite Argentina and Uruguay's large history in the most important competition of South America, they have never played a final match facing each other.

=== 1917-1923: Continuation of international and exhibition tournaments; the "Olympic Goal" ===
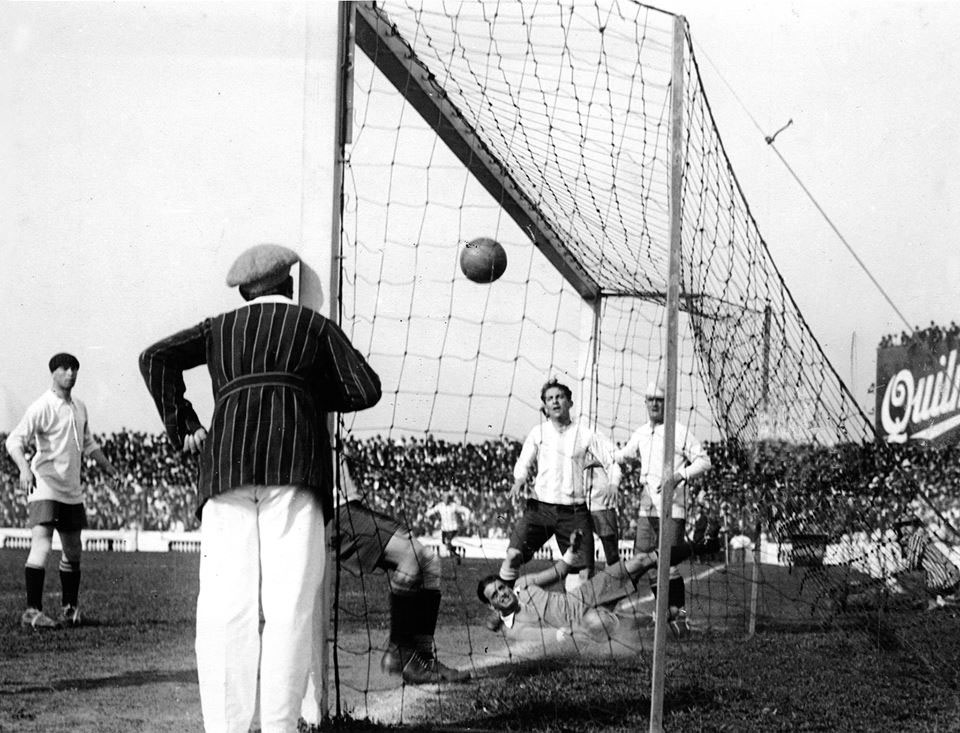
The ball, shot by Cesáreo Onzari, scores a goal for Argentina against Uruguay in 1924. This was the first goal scored direct from a corner

In 1924, Argentina played a friendly match against Uruguay at Sportivo Barracas' stadium. When only 15 minutes had been played, winger Cesáreo Onzari scored from a corner kick, with no other player touching the ball before scoring. Due to the fact that Uruguay was the Olympic champion, this play was called "Gol Olímpico". This denomination still remains.

The goal stood since FIFA had previously regulated goals scored directly from the corner kick, as Onzari did during that match. According to La Nación newspaper, 52,000 fans attended the game, an Argentina 2–1 win, where the Uruguayan team left the field with only four minutes to play. Argentine players later complained about the rough play of the Uruguayans during the match, while their rivals also complained about the aggressiveness of local spectators, who threw bottles at them at the end of the match.

=== 1924-1929: Uruguay's dominance at the Summer Olympics ===
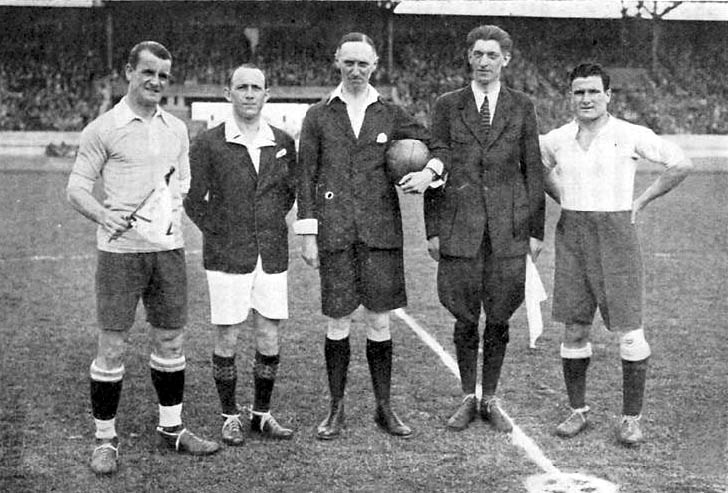
Uruguay-Argentina captains, referee Johannes Mutters and linesmen before the final match at the 1928 Summer Olympics

The 1928 Summer Olympics saw the first match of Argentina and Uruguay playing each other outside South America. In the final the Uruguayans played Argentina who had trounced Egypt, a team (Egypt) that would now fold like a house of cards; clearly out of their depth against more sophisticated opposition, conceding 6 goals to Argentina and as many as eleven to Italy in the Bronze medal match.

Argentina came to the final after thrashing United States 11–2, Belgium 6–3 and Egypt 6–0, while Uruguay had defeated The Netherlands, Germany and Italy in previous rounds. The interest was immense, with The Dutch having received 250,000 requests for tickets from all over Europe.

The first game (attended by 28,253 spectators) finished 1–1. The tie went to a replay. With the winning goal by Héctor Scarone, Uruguay won the replay match, also achieving their second consecutive gold medal, with 28,113 spectators in the stadium.

After the finals, players from both teams did not speak with each other. Tango singer Carlos Gardel invited Argentine and Uruguayan players to a show in the cabaret "El Garrón", in Paris. His efforts to achieve a reconciliation between both parts were not successful so Argentine and Uruguayan ended up in a fight during the show.

"(Carlos) Gardel knew I played the violin so he invited me to play with him on stage. When the song finished, players of both sides started to throw breadcrumbs at each other, then they started to throw breads and then, bottles of wine. The Rioplatense brotherhood went to hell. In the midst of chaos, I saw a black man coming over me, I'm not sure if he was Negro Andrade but I broke the Stradivarius on his head, just in case."

— Argentine player Raimundo Orsi, speaking about the riot at the cabaret.

=== 1930: Inauguration of the FIFA World Cup ===
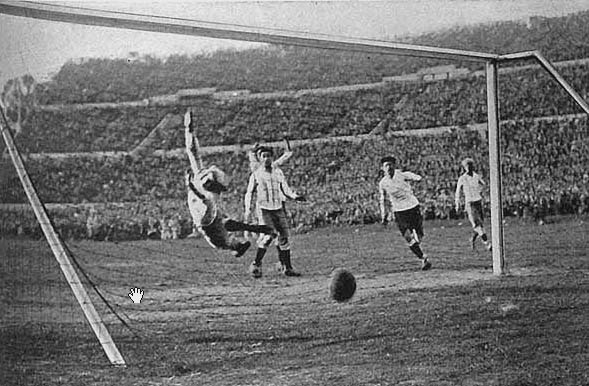
Uruguay's fourth goal, scored by striker Héctor Castro at the 1930 Final

In 1930 Uruguay organised the first FIFA World Cup. As two years before at the Summer Olympics, Argentina and Uruguay played the final, held in the Estadio Centenario in Montevideo. Argentina had previously defeated France, Mexico, Chile and the United States, while Uruguay beat Peru, Romania and Yugoslavia. Both teams thrashed United States and Yugoslavia for the same score (6–1) at the semifinals.

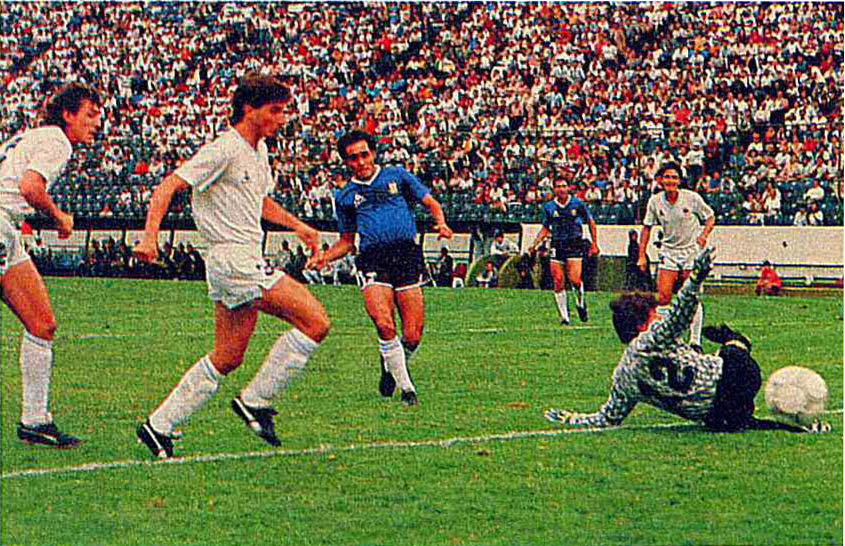
Pasculli scoring v. Uruguay at the 1986 World Cup

The final ended 4–2 to Uruguay after they trailed 2–1 at half-time, adding the title of World Cup winners to their status as Olympic champions. Jules Rimet, president of FIFA, presented the Uruguayan team with the World Cup Trophy, which was later named after him. The following day was declared a national holiday in Uruguay; in the Argentinian capital Buenos Aires a mob threw stones at the Uruguayan consulate.

The last living player from that final, Francisco Varallo (who played as a striker for Argentina), died on 30 August 2010 at the age of 100.

The second time Argentina and Uruguay met in a World Cup was in 1986, when Argentina beat Uruguay 1–0 at round of 16, with goal by Pedro Pasculli. The squad managed by Carlos Bilardo eliminated the Uruguayan side, advancing to the next stage. Argentina would then win their second world title when they beat West Germany 3–2 in the final.

== Controversies ==
=== FIFA World Cup qualifications ===
==== 2002 FIFA World Cup qualification agreement ====
In the eighteenth and last round of the 2002 FIFA World Cup qualification, Uruguay was set to meet Argentina at the Centenario. Before the match, on 14 November 2001, Uruguay was fighting for fifth place, the inter-confederation play-off spot, against the Colombian national team. Colombia managed to win against Paraguay in Asunción 4–0 and surpassed Uruguay by one point with a total of 27 points in the qualification bracket. Uruguay had 26 points but had a greater goal difference than Colombia by one goal in favor. Therefore, a tie or win was a must for the Uruguayan side to keep their qualification hopes alive. According to Juan Sebastián Verón, who was in the starting eleven for Argentina, the team noticed that the Uruguayan players and local fans "were suffering" after the result in Asunción was already known. After the conclusion of the first half which saw Argentina and Uruguay tied 1–1, with a goal by Claudio López and Darío Silva respectively, the Argentine side stopped attacking in the second half and the match resulted in a tie. This was enough for Uruguay to qualify for the play-off competition and resulted in Colombia's elimination via goal differentiation. Argentine sports newspaper Olé entitled their article on the match, "You're Welcome, bo!", whereas Uruguayan newspaper El País entitled theirs, "Our Great Brother".

Local media also attributed Argentine players Germán Burgos and Juan Pablo Sorín with saying that they would have let themselves lose the match if Uruguay needed the three points. Colombia asked FIFA the week of the playoffs to investigate the match, but no action took place. In 2004, then-Uruguayan coach Juan Ramón Carrasco clarified that an "agreement" was made with the Argentine team to maintain the result to qualify for the playoffs. Uruguay would eventually qualify in the playoff competition, having beat Australia 3–0 at home after a 1–0 defeat in the first leg.

==== 2006 and 2014 FIFA World Cup qualifications ====
Football journalists have criticised similar actions taken place between the two nations in later FIFA World Cup campaigns. Four years later, during the 2006 FIFA World Cup qualification, an almost identical scenario took place; the Colombian national team earned a must-needed three points after winning against Paraguay in Asunción 1–0, and if Argentina did not lose its last game against Uruguay in Montevideo, Colombia would advanced to the playoffs. However, José Pékerman's Argentina had nothing at stake, they already qualified. In a little effort match on the Argentine side, the Uruguayans, led by Jorge Fossati, won the match 1–0 with a goal by Álvaro Recoba in the 46th minute. This gave Uruguay the advantage in qualifying for playoff competition. However, Australia won the playoffs and qualified for the World Cup via penalties 4–2, after a 1–1 series draw.

In the 2014 FIFA World Cup qualification, with Alejandro Sabella as coach and Argentina having already classified, an alternative team was placed in the last match of the campaign on 15 October 2013 against Uruguay. The Uruguayan side came out with a 3–2 victory and secured a comfortable spot to advance to playoff competition once again, this time against Jordan. Uruguay easily qualified against the Jordan national team in a 5–0 series.

==== 2018 FIFA World Cup qualification second match ====
A similar occurrence to that in 2002 and 2006 happened during the second matchup between Argentina and Uruguay during the 2018 FIFA World Cup qualification. On 31 August 2017, the match ended in a goalless draw with both teams earning one point. Unlike previous qualifications, Uruguay was in a comfortable position, entering the fifteenth round in third place, whereas Argentina was desperate to breathe life into their World Cup campaign, fighting at the playoff spot in fifth place. Before the match, Lionel Messi and Luis Suárez wore specialised shirts of their national teams to promote Argentina and Uruguay's 2030 FIFA World Cup bid; Luis Suárez's kit boasted the large number 20 on the front, while Messi's jersey featured the number 30.

Argentine and Uruguayan journalists criticised the match, especially in the last 20 minutes, claiming that the game was all "business" and both sides didn't want to take any risks. Uruguayan newspaper El País headlined that week's newspaper as "Brothers again", stating that "there are bad draws, good draws, and also very good ones. Precisely, what occurred last night in that match falls in that last category."

=== Notable confrontations and brawls ===
==== 2019 exhibition match ====
On 29 November 2019, Argentina and Uruguay played an international friendly match at Bloomfield Stadium in Tel Aviv, Israel. During the second half, Lionel Messi was fouled by Matías Vecino, who reacted angrily to the challenge. Cavani then exchanged words with Messi, asking if he wanted to "fight it out," to which Messi replied, "Whenever you want." Both sides eventually brushed it off in a 2–2 draw. Both Cavani and Messi said in post-game interviews that there is no bad blood and that these are how the matches are.

==== 2022 FIFA World Cup ====
Although Argentina and Uruguay were ineligible to be drawn at the same group given their CONMEBOL memberships, a fight did break out, albeit involving fans. From a bus carrying Mexican fans also included a group of Uruguayan fans who later jointly sang a song "Come to see! Come to see! In the Falklands, English language is spoken", with Falklands intentionally included, sparking wrath from Argentine fans. Originally, it was believed that only Mexican fans were singing this song, but later investigation by Mexican commercial newspaper El Imparcial revealed that Uruguayans were also among the people singing it.

==== 2026 FIFA World Cup qualification scuffle ====
During the fifth round of the 2026 FIFA World Cup qualification, Argentina hosted Uruguay in La Bombonera. During the 19th minute of the match, several players got into a scuffle, most notably Rodrigo De Paul and Mathías Olivera. After the two got into a heated exchange, Messi approached Olivera and grabbed him by the throat. The trio was eventually separated; Manuel Ugarte then confronted De Paul with obscene gestures. Uruguay would eventually win the match 2–0 with goals from Ronald Araújo and Darwin Núñez.

Messi was asked about the confrontation in a post-game interview, stating that young players from the Uruguayan squad, particularly Ugarte, should "learn respect to their elders." but did later say that these occurrences are normal, "in these types of games, qualifiers, it's always like this with Uruguay." De Paul and Ugarte also played down the match. De Paul said, "It's dumb, whatever happened stays on the pitch.", whereas Ugarte has apologised for the gestures, claiming it was in the heat of the moment, and agreeing with De Paul's statement.

== Matches overview ==
As of 21 March 2025

Competition	Played	Arg. won	Draw	Uru. won	Arg. goals	Uru. goals
FIFA World Cup	2	1	0	1	3	4
FIFA World Cup qualification	16	9	4	3	21	11
Copa América	32	15	4	13	43	36
Summer Olympics	2	0	1	1	2	3
Subtotal	52	25	9	18	69	54
Copa Lipton	27	10	11	6	37	27
Copa Newton	27	13	6	8	49	35
Copa del Atlántico (+1976 Copa Lipton / Copa Newton)	4	4	0	0	13	2
Copa Premier Honor Uruguayo	15	4	3	8	16	26
Copa Premier Honor Argentino	12	7	2	3	21	13
Copa Héctor Rivadavia Gómez	5	2	1	2	6	8
Copa Juan Mignaburu	5	4	1	0	13	3
Copa Círculo de la Prensa	3	1	0	2	10	9
Copa Ministro de Relaciones Exteriores	3	0	2	1	4	5
Copa Presidente Roque Sáenz Peña	2	1	1	0	3	2
Copa Centenario Revolución de Mayo	1	1	0	0	4	1
Copa Montevideo	1	1	0	0	3	1
Copa Cámara de Diputados Argentina	1	1	0	0	2	0
Copa Centro Automovilístico Uruguayo	1	0	1	0	1	1
Taça Independência	1	1	0	0	1	0
Official friendlies	30	14	9	7	47	29
Full "A" matches	190	89	46	51	299	216
Unofficial friendlies (1943–1948)	11	5	3	3	24	22
Subtotal (AFA×AUF)	201	94	49	58	323	238
Unofficial friendlies (AUF×FAF)	7	2	2	3	16	15
Copa Premier Honor Uruguayo (FUF×AAmF)	1	1	0	0	3	2
Copa Confraternidad Rioplatense (FUF×AAmF)	1	0	0	1	0	1
Unofficial friendlies (AUF×AAmF)	2	1	0	1	4	4
Unofficial friendly (FUF×AAmF)	1	0	1	0	0	0
Total	213	98	52	63	346	260

=== Eliminations ===
- 1928 Olympic final: Uruguay 1–1 Argentina, Uruguay 2–1 Argentina (replay) (Note: Note: Only the Olympic Games from 1908 to 1948 are considered official: .)
- 1930 World Cup final: Uruguay 4–2 Argentina
- 1986 World Cup round of 16: Argentina 1–0 Uruguay
- 1987 Copa América semi-final: Uruguay 1–0 Argentina
- 2011 Copa América quarter-final: Argentina 1–1 (4–5 p) Uruguay

== List of matches ==
The chart includes the complete list of matches played between both teams:

#	Date	City	Venue	Winner	Score	Competition	Argentine goals	Uruguayan goals
1	20 Jul 1902	Montevideo	Albion FC	Argentina (1)	6–0	Friendly	Dickinson, Arimalo (o.g.), Morgan, Carve (o.g.), Anderson, J. Brown	
2	13 Sep 1903	Buenos Aires	CA Palermo	Uruguay (1)	3–2	Friendly	J. Brown (2)	C. Céspedes (2), B. Céspedes
3	15 Aug 1905	Buenos Aires	Sociedad Sportiva	Draw (1)	0–0	Copa Lipton		
4	15 Aug 1906	Montevideo	Parque Central	Argentina (2)	2–0	Copa Lipton	A. Brown, T. González	
5	21 Oct 1906	Buenos Aires	Sociedad Sportiva	Argentina (3)	2–1	Copa Newton	W. Hutton, E. Brown	Peralta
6	15 Aug 1907	Buenos Aires	CA Estudiantes	Argentina (4)	2–1	Copa Lipton	E. Brown, Jacobs	Zibechi
7	6 Oct 1907	Montevideo	Parque Central	Argentina (5)	2–1	Copa Newton	Malbrán (2)	Zibechi
8	15 Aug 1908	Montevideo	Parque Central	Draw (2)	2–2	Copa Lipton	E.A. Brown, Susán	Zumarán, Bertone
9	13 Sep 1908	Buenos Aires	GEBA	Argentina (6)	2–1	Copa Newton	E. Brown, W. Hutton	Brachi
10	4 Oct 1908	Buenos Aires	GEBA	Uruguay (2)	1–0	Copa Premier Honor Arg		Brachi
11	15 Aug 1909	Buenos Aires	GEBA	Argentina (7)	2–1	Copa Lipton	W. Hutton, E. Brown	Zumarán
12	19 Sep 1909	Montevideo	Belvedere	Draw (3)	2–2	Copa Newton	Viale, A. García (o.g.)	Raymonda, Buck
13	10 Oct 1909	Buenos Aires	GEBA	Argentina (8)	3–1	Copa Premier Honor Arg	A. Brown (2), J. Brown	Raymonda
14	12 Jun 1910	Buenos Aires	GEBA	Argentina (9)	4–1	Copa Centenario Rev. Mayo	Viale, Hayes, W. Hutton, Susán	Piendibene
15	15 Aug 1910	Montevideo	Belvedere	Uruguay (3)	3–1	Copa Lipton	Hayes	Dacal, Zibechi, C. Scarone
16	13 Nov 1910	Buenos Aires	GEBA	Draw (4)	1–1	Copa Premier Honor Arg	M. González	Piendibene
17	27 Nov 1910	Buenos Aires	GEBA	Uruguay (4)	6–2	Copa Premier Honor Arg	M. González, Viale	Quagha, Seoanne (2), Piendibene, C. Scarone (2)
18 (Note: Not included by some historians in their records.)	30 Apr 1911	Montevideo	Belvedere	Argentina (10)	2–1	Friendly	M. González (2)	Canavesi
19	15 Aug 1911	Buenos Aires	GEBA	Uruguay (5)	2–0	Copa Lipton		Piendibene, Dacal
20	17 Sep 1911	Montevideo	Parque Central	Argentina (11)	3–2	Copa Newton	A. Brown, E. Brown (2)	Cannavesi, Romano
21	8 Oct 1911	Montevideo	Parque Central	Draw (5)	1–1	Copa Premier Honor Uru	W. Hutton	Piendibene
22	22 Oct 1911	Buenos Aires	GEBA	Argentina (12)	2–0	Copa Premier Honor Arg	Piaggio (2)	
23	29 Oct 1911	Montevideo	Parque Central	Uruguay (6)	3–0	Copa Premier Honor Uru		Piendibene (2), Canavessi
24	25 Feb 1912	Avellaneda	Independiente	Argentina (13)	2–0	Friendly	Ohaco, H. Hayes	
25	15 Aug 1912	Montevideo	Parque Central	Uruguay (7)	2–0	Copa Lipton	Dacal, C. Scarone	
26	25 Aug 1912	Montevideo	Parque Central	Uruguay (8)	3–0	Copa Premier Honor Uru	Dacal, C. Scarone, Romano	
27	22 Sep 1912	Buenos Aires	GEBA	Uruguay (9)	1–0	Copa Premier Honor Arg		Reparaz (o.g.)
28	6 Oct 1912	Avellaneda	Racing	Draw (6)	3–3	Copa Newton	Hutton, Viale (2)	Romano, Dacal, C. Scarone
29	1 Dec 1912	Montevideo	Parque Central	Argentina (14)	3–1 (a.e.t.)	Copa Montevideo	González, Marcovecchio, Viale	C. Scarone
30	27 Apr 1913	Montevideo	Parque Central	Uruguay (10)	4–0	Friendly		Irsagaray, Porte, Bastos
31	27 Apr 1913	Buenos Aires	GEBA	Draw (7)	0–0	Friendly		
32	15 Jun 1913	Avellaneda	Racing	Draw (8)	1–1	Copa R. Sáenz Peña	M. González	Gorla
33	9 Jul 1913	Avellaneda	Racing	Argentina (15)	2–1	Copa R. Sáenz Peña	M. González (2)	Bastos
34	13 Jul 1913	Montevideo	Parque Central	Uruguay (11)	5–4	Friendly	G. Guidi (3), Dannaher	Zibechi, Legarburo, J. Pérez, Gorla (2)
35	13 Jul 1913	Buenos Aires	Parque Central	Draw (9)	3–3	Friendly	Giamondi (2), Piaggio	Bastos, Marques (2)
36	15 Aug 1913	Avellaneda	Racing	Argentina (16)	4–0	Copa Lipton	Susán (4)	
37	31 Aug 1913	Buenos Aires	GEBA	Argentina (17)	2–0	Copa Premier Honor Arg	H. Hayes, Polimeni	
38	28 Sep 1913	Buenos Aires	GEBA	Argentina (18)	4–0	Friendly	Dannaher (2), Polimeni (2)	
39	5 Oct 1913	Montevideo	Parque Central	Uruguay (12)	1–0	Copa Premier Honor Uru	Vallarino	
40	26 Oct 1913	Montevideo	Parque Central	Uruguay (13)	1–0	Copa Newton		Gorla
41	30 Aug 1914	Montevideo	Parque Central	Uruguay (14)	3–2	Copa Premier Honor Uru	Calomino, Dannaher	Vallarino, Dacal, Rubio
42	13 Sep 1914	Buenos Aires	GEBA	Argentina (19)	2–1	Copa Premier Honor Arg	Gallardo, Lezcano	Vallarino
43	15 Nov 1914	Montevideo	Parque Central	Argentina (20)	3–2	Friendly		C. Scarone, Piendibene, Varela
44	22 Nov 1914	Buenos Aires	GEBA	Argentina (21)	3–0	Friendly	Cazenave (2), Capeletti	
45	28 Mar 1915	Buenos Aires	GEBA	Draw (10)	0–0	Friendly		
46	18 Jul 1915	Montevideo	Parque Central	Argentina (22)	3–2	Copa Premier Honor Uru	Marcovecchio (2), Hayes	Dacal, Lázaro
47	15 Aug 1915	Buenos Aires	GEBA	Argentina (23)	2–1	Copa Lipton	Marcovecchio, Hayes	Piendibene
48	12 Sep 1915	Montevideo	Parque Central	Uruguay (15)	2–0	Copa Newton		Piendibene (2)
49	17 Jul 1916	Avalleneda	Racing	Draw (11)	0–0	1916 Sudamericano		
50	15 Aug 1916	Montevideo	Parque Central	Argentina (24)	2–1	Copa Lipton	Hayes, Laiolo	Gradín
51	15 Aug 1916	Avellaneda	Racing	Argentina (25)	3–1	Copa Newton	Ohaco (2), Hiller	Farinnasso
52	1 Oct 1916	Avellaneda	Racing	Argentina (26)	7–2	Copa Círculo La Prensa	Simmons, Hiller (3), Cabano, E. Hayes (2)	Buffoni, Mongelar
53	1 Oct 1916	Montevideo	Belvedere	Argentina (27)	1–0	Copa Premier Honor Uru	Badalini	
54	29 Oct 1916	Montevideo	Parque Central	Uruguay (16)	3–1	Copa Círculo La Prensa	Guidi	Gradín (2), Mongelar
55	18 Jul 1917	Montevideo	Parque Central	Argentina (28)	2–0	Copa Premier Honor Uru	Marcovecchio (2)	
56	15 Aug 1917	Avellaneda	Racing	Argentina (29)	1–0	Copa Lipton	Calomino	
57	2 Sep 1917	Montevideo	Parque Central	Uruguay (17)	1–0	Copa Newton		Romano
58	14 Oct 1917	Montevideo	Parque Pereira	Uruguay (18)	1–0	1917 Sudamericano		H. Scarone
59	18 Jul 1918	Montevideo	Parque Pereira	Draw (12)	1–1	Copa Premier Honor Uru	Rofrano	Gradín
60	28 Jul 1918	Montevideo	Parque Pereira	Uruguay (19)	3–1	Copa Premier Honor Uru	C. García	C. Scarone, Romano (2)
61	15 Aug 1918	Buenos Aires	GEBA	Draw (13)	0–0	Copa Premier Honor Arg		
62	25 Aug 1918	Buenos Aires	GEBA	Argentina (30)	2–1	Copa Premier Honor Arg	Martín (2)	Somma
63	20 Sep 1918	Montevideo	Parque Pereira	Draw (14)	1–1	Copa Lipton	Calandra	Scarone
64	29 Sep 1918	Buenos Aires	GEBA	Argentina (31)	2–0	Copa Newton	Vivaldo, Blanco	
65	13 May 1919	Rio de Janeiro	das Laranjeiras	Uruguay (20)	3–2	1919 Sudamericano	Izaguirre, Varela (o.g.)	C. Scarone, H. Scarone, Gradín
66	18 Jul 1919	Montevideo	Parque Pereira	Uruguay (21)	4–1	Copa Premier Honor Uru	E. Hayes	H. Scarone (2), O. Pérez, Romano
67	24 Aug 1919	Montevideo	Parque Pereira	Uruguay (22)	2–1	Copa Newton	Olazar	Recanattini (o.g.), Castagnola (o.g.)
68	7 Sep 1919	Buenos Aires	GEBA	Uruguay (23)	2–1	Copa Lipton	Badalini	H. Scarone (2)
69	19 Oct 1919	Buenos Aires	GEBA	Argentina (32)	6–1	Copa Premier Honor Arg	Libonatti (3), Celli, Vivaldo, Chavín	Fraga
70	7 Dec 1919	Montevideo	Parque Pereira	Uruguay (24)	4–2	Copa Círculo La Prensa	Libonatti, Badalini	Piendibene (3), H. Scarone
71	18 Jul 1920	Montevideo	Parque Central	Uruguay (25)	2–0	Copa Premier Honor Uru		H. Scarone, Romano
72	25 Jul 1920	Buenos Aires	Sportivo Barracas	Uruguay (26)	3–1	Copa Newton	Clarcke	Romano, Somma, Piendibene
73	8 Aug 1920	Buenos Aires	Sportivo Barracas	Argentina (33)	1–0	Copa Premier Honor Arg	Calomino	
74	12 Sep 1920	Viña del Mar	Valparaíso SC	Draw (15)	1–1	1920 Sudamericano	Echeverría	Piendibene
75	30 Oct 1921	Buenos Aires	Sportivo Barracas	Argentina (34)	1–0	1921 Sudamericano	Libonatti	
76	21 Jan 1922	Buenos Aires	La Boca	Argentina (35)	3–1	Friendly		
77	22 Jan 1922	Buenos Aires	GEBA	Uruguay (27)	3–1	Friendly	Annunziata	
78	8 Oct 1922	Rio de Janeiro	Laranjeiras	Uruguay (28)	1–0	1922 Sudamericano		Buffoni
79	12 Nov 1922	Montevideo	Parque Central	Uruguay (29)	1–0	Copa Lipton		Romano
80	10 Dec 1922	Montevideo	Parque Central	Uruguay (30)	1–0	Copa Premier Honor Uru		C. Scarone
81	17 Dec 1922	Buenos Aires	Sportivo Barracas	Draw (16)	2–2	Copa Newton	Badalini (2)	C. Scarone, Saldombide
82	24 Jun 1923	Buenos Aires	Sportivo Barracas	Draw (17)	0–0	Copa Lipton		
83	15 Jul 1923	Buenos Aires	Sportivo Barracas	Draw (18)	2–2	Copa Min. Rel. Ext.	Izaguirre, Onzari	Olivieri (2)
84	22 Jul 1923	Montevideo	Parque Central	Draw (19)	2–2	Copa Premier Honor Uru	Tarasconi, Irurieta	Romano, Saldombide
85	30 Sep 1923	Montevideo	Parque Central	Argentina (36)	2–0	Copa Premier Honor Uru	Saruppo, López	
86	2 Dec 1923	Montevideo	Parque Central	Uruguay (31)	2–0	1923 Sudamericano		Petrone, Somma
87 (Note: The AUF did not count this match on its website.) (Note: Contested by teams from the dissident associations (FUF and AAmF).)	8 Dec 1923	Avellaneda	Racing	Uruguay (32)	3–2	Copa Min. Rel. Ext.	Annunziata, L. Acosta	H. Castro (2), Borjas
88 (Note: The 1923 and 1924 editions of Copa Newton had the particulatiry of two matches being held on the same day, 25 May 1924. One match was held in Montevideo, and the other in Buenos Aires. The match in Montevideo was considered part of the 1923 edition.)	25 May 1924	Montevideo	Parque Central	Uruguay (33)	2–0	Copa Newton		Figueora, Sufotti
89	25 May 1924	Buenos Aires	Sportivo Barracas	Argentina (37)	4–0	Copa Newton	Goicoechea (3), Aguirre	
90	10 Aug 1924	Buenos Aires	Sportivo Barracas	Draw (20)	0–0	Copa Min. Rel. Ext.		
91	31 Aug 1924	Montevideo	Estadio Pocitos	Argentina (38)	3–2	Copa Premier Honor Uru	Lucarelli (2), Monti	Ruotta (2)
92	21 Sep 1924	Montevideo	Parque Central	Draw (21)	1–1	Friendly	Tarasconi	Petrone
93	28 Sep 1924	Buenos Aires	Sportivo Barracas	Draw (22)	0–0	Friendly		
94	2 Oct 1924	Buenos Aires	Sportivo Barracas	Argentina (39)	2–1	Friendly	Onzari, Tarasconi	Cea
95	2 Nov 1924	Montevideo	Parque Central	Draw (23)	0–0	1924 Sudamericano		
96	16 Nov 1924	Montevideo	Parque Central	Uruguay (34)	1–0	Copa Confraternidad		
97	24 Oct 1926	Santiago	Campos de Sports	Uruguay (35)	2–0	1926 Sudamericano		Borjas, Castro
98	14 Jul 1927	Montevideo	Parque Central	Argentina (40)	1–0	Copa Newton	Carricaberry	
99	30 Aug 1927	Buenos Aires	Boca Juniors	Uruguay (36)	1–0	Copa Lipton		H. Scarone
100	20 Nov 1927	Lima	Nacional Perú	Argentina (41)	3–2	1927 Sudamericano	Recanattini, Luna, Canavessi	H. Scarone (2)
101	10 Jun 1928	Amsterdam	Olympic Stadium	Draw (24)	1–1	1928 Summer Olympics	Ferreira	Petrone
102	13 Jun 1928	Amsterdam	Olympic Stadium	Uruguay (37)	2–1	1928 Summer Olympics	Monti	Figueroa, H. Scarone
103	30 Aug 1928	Avellaneda	Independiente	Argentina (42)	1–0	Copa Newton	Seoane	
104	21 Sep 1928	Montevideo	Parque Central	Draw (25)	2–2	Copa Lipton	Maglio, Alonso	Píriz, Petrone
105	16 Jun 1929	Buenos Aires	San Lorenzo	Argentina (43)	2–0	Copa Cám. Diputados	Peucelle, Scopelli	
106	16 Jun 1929	Montevideo	Parque Central	Draw (26)	1–1	Copa Centro Automovilístico	Maglio	Carbone
107	20 Sep 1929	Montevideo	Parque Central	Uruguay (38)	2–1	Copa Newton	Maglio	H. Castro, Fernández
108	28 Sep 1929	Buenos Aires	San Lorenzo	Draw (27)	0–0	Copa Lipton		
109	17 Nov 1929	Buenos Aires	San Lorenzo	Argentina (44)	2–0	1929 Sudamericano	Ferreira, M. Evaristo	
110	25 May 1930	Buenos Aires	San Lorenzo	Draw (28)	1–1	Copa Newton	Varallo	Petrone
111	30 Jul 1930	Montevideo	Centenario	Uruguay (39)	4–2	1930 FIFA World Cup	Peucelle, Stábile	Dorado, Cea, Iriarte, Castro
112	15 May 1932	Buenos Aires	Sportivo Barracas	Argentina (45)	2–0	Friendly	Cherro, H. Martínez	
113	18 May 1932	Montevideo	Centenario	Uruguay (40)	1–0	Friendly		Dorado
114	21 Jan 1933	Montevideo	Centenario	Uruguay (41)	2–1	Friendly	Guaita	Haeberli, Píriz
115	5 Feb 1933	Avellaneda	Independiente	Argentina (46)	4–1	Friendly	Cherro	Mata
116	14 Dec 1933	Montevideo	Centenario	Argentina (47)	1–0	Friendly	Varallo	
117	18 Jul 1934	Montevideo	Centenario	Draw (29)	2–2	Friendly	Peralta, Benítez Cáceres	J. García, Ciocca
118	15 Aug 1934	Avellaneda	Independiente	Argentina (48)	1–0	Friendly	Peucelle	
119	27 Jan 1935	Lima	Nacional	Uruguay (42)	3–0	1935 Sudamericano		Castro, Taboada, Ciocca
120	18 Jul 1935	Montevideo	Centenario	Draw (30)	1–1	Copa Rivadavia Gómez	Peucelle	Píriz
121	15 Aug 1935	Avellaneda	Independiente	Argentina (49)	3–0	Copa Mignaburu	Zozaya (2), D. García	
122	9 Aug 1936	Avellaneda	Independiente	Argentina (50)	1–0	Copa Mignaburu	Zozaya	
123	20 Sep 1936	Montevideo	Centenario	Uruguay (43)	2–1	Copa Rivadavia Gómez	D. García	Villadonica (2)
124	23 Jan 1937	Buenos Aires	San Lorenzo	Uruguay (44)	3–2	1937 Sudamericano	Varallo, Zozaya	Ithurbide, Piriz, Varela
125	10 Oct 1937	Montevideo	Centenario	Argentina (51)	3–0	Copa Newton		
126	11 Nov 1937	Avellaneda	Independiente	Argentina (52)	5–1	Copa Lipton	Masantonio (3), Fidel, E. García	Muñiz
127	18 Jun 1938	Buenos Aires	River Plate	Argentina (53)	1–0	Copa Mignaburu	Moreno	
128	12 Oct 1938	Montevideo	Centenario	Argentina (54)	3–2	Copa Rivadavia Gómez	E. García, Cavadini, Cosso	Varela, Ciocca
129	18 Jul 1940	Montevideo	Centenario	Uruguay (45)	3–0	Copa Rivadavia Gómez		Porta, Rivero (2)
130	15 Aug 1940	Buenos Aires	River Plate	Argentina (55)	5–0	Copa Mignaburu	Esperón, Marvezzi, Moreno (2), Sarlanga	
131	23 Feb 1941	Santiago	Nacional Chile	Argentina (56)	1–0	1941 Sudamericano	Sastre	
132	7 Feb 1942	Montevideo	Centenario	Uruguay (46)	1–0	1942 Sudamericano		Zapirain
133	25 May 1942	Buenos Aires	River Plate	Argentina (57)	4–1	Copa Newton	Alberti, Martino, Pontoni	Zapirain
134	25 Aug 1942	Montevideo	Centenario	Draw (31)	1–1	Copa Lipton	Muñoz	Álvarez
135	6 Jan 1943	Buenos Aires	San Lorenzo	Argentina (58)	1–0	Friendly	Martino	
136	9 Jan 1943	Montevideo	Centenario	Uruguay (47)	6–2	Friendly	Alberti, S. González	A. García (2), Varela, Zapirain (2), Porta
137	28 Mar 1943	Buenos Aires	River Plate	Draw (32)	3–3	Copa Mignaburu	Pontoni (2), Martino	Medina (2), Castro
138	4 Apr 1943	Montevideo	Centenario	Argentina (59)	1–0	Copa Rivadavia Gómez	Canteli	
139	5 Jan 1944	Montevideo	Centenario	Argentina (60)	3–1	Friendly		
140	8 Jan 1944	Buenos Aires	San Lorenzo	Draw (33)	3–3	Friendly		
141	29 Jan 1944	Montevideo	Centenario	Uruguay (48)	2–1	Friendly	Labruna	Medina, Zapirain
142	29 Jan 1944	Buenos Aires	San Lorenzo	Argentina (61)	6–2	Friendly	Martino, Salvini, Pontoni (3), Loustau	Chirimini, Porta
143	25 Feb 1945	Santiago	Nacional Chile	Argentina (62)	1–0	1945 Sudamericano	Martino	
144	18 Jul 1945	Montevideo	Centenario	Draw (34)	2–2	Copa Lipton	Martino, Young (o.g.)	O. Varela (2)
145	15 Aug 1945	Buenos Aires	San Lorenzo	Argentina (63)	6–2	Copa Newton	Loustau, Ferraro, Méndez, Martino (2), Pedernera	Ortiz, Falero
146	29 Dec 1945	Montevideo	Centenario	Draw (35)	1–1	Friendly		
147	2 Feb 1946	Buenos Aires	San Lorenzo	Argentina (64)	3–1	1946 Sudamericano	Pedernera, Labruna, N. Méndez	Riephoff
148	2 Mar 1947	Buenos Aires	River Plate	Argentina (65)	2–1	Friendly		
149	9 Mar 1947	Montevideo	Centenario	Draw (36)	4–4	Friendly		
150	28 Dec 1947	Guayaquil	George Capwell	Argentina (66)	3–1	1947 Sudamericano	Méndez (2), Loustau	Britos
151	18 May 1948	Montevideo	Centenario	Argentina (67)	1–0	Friendly		
152	25 May 1948	Buenos Aires	Huracán	Uruguay (49)	2–0	Friendly		
153	27 Mar 1955	Santiago	Nacional Chile	Argentina (68)	6–1	1955 Sudamericano	Micheli (2), Labruna (3), Borello	Míguez
154	15 Feb 1956	Montevideo	Centenario	Uruguay (50)	1–0	1956 Sudamericano		Ambrois
155	1 Jul 1956	Montevideo	Centenario	Uruguay (51)	2–1	Taça do Atlântico	Grillo (2)	Abbaddie
156	10 Oct 1956	Paysandú	Parque Artigas	Argentina (69)	2–1	Friendly	Garabal (2)	Ambrois
157	14 Nov 1956	Buenos Aires	Boca Juniors	Draw (37)	2–2	Friendly	Angelillo, Corbatta	Míguez
158	20 Mar 1957	Lima	Nacional Perú	Argentina (70)	4–0	1957 Sudamericano	Maschio (2), Angelillo, Sanfilippo	
159	23 May 1957	Montevideo	Centenario	Draw (38)	0–0	Copa Newton		
160	5 Jun 1957	Buenos Aires	Huracán	Draw (39)	1–1	Copa Lipton	Angelillo	Correa
161	6 Apr 1958	Montevideo	Centenario	Uruguay (52)	1–0	Friendly		Míguez
162	30 Apr 1958	Buenos Aires	River Plate	Argentina (71)	2–0	Friendly	E. Prado, Infante	
163	30 Mar 1959	Buenos Aires	River Plate	Argentina (72)	4–1	1959 Sudamericano (Arg)	Belén (2), H. Sosa (2)	De Marco
164	16 Dec 1959	Guayaquil	Estadio Modelo	Uruguay (53)	5–0	1959 Sudamericano (Ecu)		Silveira (2), Bergara (2), Sasía
165	17 Aug 1960	Buenos Aires	River Plate	Argentina (73)	4–0	Taça do Atlântico	Sanfilippo (3), Jiménez	
166	13 Mar 1962	Montevideo	Centenario	Draw (40)	1–1	Friendly	Belén	Alvarez
167	15 Aug 1962	Buenos Aires	River Plate	Argentina (74)	3–1	Copa Lipton	Pagani, Willington, A.M. González	Mattera
168	2 Feb 1967	Montevideo	Centenario	Uruguay (54)	1–0	1967 Sudamericano		Rocha
169	5 Jun 1968	Buenos Aires	River Plate	Argentina (75)	2–0	Copa Lipton	Avallay, Fischer	
170	20 Jun 1968	Montevideo	Centenario	Uruguay (55)	2–1	Copa Newton	Fischer	Morales, Zubía
171	8 Apr 1970	Buenos Aires	Boca Juniors	Argentina (76)	2–1	Friendly	Conigliaro, Mas	Zubía
172	15 Apr 1970	Montevideo	Centenario	Uruguay (56)	2–1	Friendly	Mas	Cubilla, Rocha
173	14 Jul 1971	Buenos Aires	Boca Juniors	Argentina (77)	1–0	Friendly	Madurga	
174	18 Jul 1971	Montevideo	Centenario	Draw (41)	1–1	Friendly	Bianchi	Bertocchi
175	6 Jul 1972	Porto Alegre	Beira-Rio	Argentina (78)	1–0	Copa Independencia Brasil	Mas	
176	17 May 1973	Buenos Aires	Vélez Sarsfield	Draw (42)	1–1	Copa Lipton	Brindisi	Morena
177	23 May 1973	Montevideo	Centenario	Draw (43)	1–1	Copa Newton	Babington	Rey
178	18 Jul 1975	Montevideo	Centenario	Argentina (79)	3–2	Copa Newton	Alonso, Valdano (2)	Morena (2)
179	8 Apr 1976	Buenos Aires	Vélez Sarsfield	Argentina (80)	4–1	Taça do Atlântico (Note: Also held as the 1976 Copa Lipton edition.)	Kempes (2), Luque, Scotta	D. Pereyra
180	9 Jun 1976	Montevideo	Centenario	Argentina (81)	3–0	Taça do Atlântico (Note: Also held as the 1976 Copa Newton edition.)	Luque, Kempes, Houseman	
181	25 Apr 1978	Montevideo	Centenario	Uruguay (57)	2–0	Friendly		Maneiro, Morena
182	3 May 1978	Buenos Aires	Boca Juniors	Argentina (82)	3–0	Friendly	Alonso, Luque, Ardiles	
183	18 Jul 1984	Montevideo	Centenario	Uruguay (58)	1–0	Friendly		Barrios
184	2 Aug 1984	Buenos Aires	River Plate	Draw (44)	0–0	Friendly		
185	16 Jun 1986	Puebla	Cuauhtémoc	Argentina (83)	1–0	1986 World Cup	Pasculli	
186	9 Jul 1987	Buenos Aires	River Plate	Uruguay (59)	1–0	1987 Copa América		Alzamendi
187	8 Jul 1989	Goiânia	Serra Dourada	Argentina (84)	1–0	1989 Copa América	Caniggia	
188	14 Jul 1989	Rio de Janeiro	Maracanã	Uruguay (60)	2–0	1989 Copa América		R. Sosa
189	23 Sep 1992	Montevideo	Centenario	Draw (45)	0–0	Copa Lipton		
190	12 Jan 1997	Montevideo	Centenario	Draw (46)	0–0	1998 World Cup qualif.		
191	12 Oct 1997	Buenos Aires	River Plate	Draw (47)	0–0	1998 World Cup qualif.		
192	7 Jul 1999	Luque	Feliciano Cáceres	Argentina (85)	2–0	1999 Copa América	C. González, Palermo	
193	8 Oct 2000	Buenos Aires	River Plate	Argentina (86)	2–1	2002 World Cup qualif.	Gallardo, Batistuta	Ayala (o.g.)
194	14 Nov 2001	Montevideo	Centenario	Draw (48)	1–1	2002 World Cup qualif.	C. López	D. Silva
195	11 Jun 2003	La Plata	Estadio Único	Draw (49)	2–2	Friendly	D. Milito (2)	Chevantón, G. Milito (o.g.)
196	20 Aug 2003	Florence	Artemio Franchi	Argentina (87)	3–2	Friendly	Verón, Samuel, D'Alessandro	Forlán, Ligüera
197	13 Jul 2004	Piura	Miguel Grau	Argentina (88)	4–2	2004 Copa América	C. González, Figueroa, Ayala	Estoyanoff, V. Sánchez
198	9 Oct 2004	Buenos Aires	River Plate	Argentina (89)	4–2	2006 World Cup qualif.	L. González, Figueroa (2), Zanetti	Rodríguez, Chevantón
199	12 Oct 2005	Montevideo	Centenario	Uruguay (61)	1–0	2006 World Cup qualif.		Recoba
200	11 Oct 2008	Buenos Aires	River Plate	Argentina (90)	2–1	2010 World Cup qualif.	Messi, Agüero	Lugano
201	14 Oct 2009	Montevideo	Centenario	Argentina (91)	1–0	2010 World Cup qualif.	Bolatti	
202	16 Jul 2011	Santa Fe	Colón	Draw (50) (Note: Uruguay won on penalties but result counted as a draw.)	1–1 (5–4 p)	2011 Copa América	Higuaín	D. Pérez
203	12 Oct 2012	Mendoza	Malvinas Arg.	Argentina (92)	3–0	2014 World Cup qualif.	Messi (2), Agüero	
204	15 Oct 2013	Montevideo	Centenario	Uruguay (62)	3–2	2014 World Cup qualif.	M. Rodríguez	C. Rodríguez, Suárez, Cavani
205	16 Jun 2015	La Serena	La Portada	Argentina (93)	1–0	2015 Copa América	Agüero	
206	1 Sep 2016	Mendoza	Malvinas Arg.	Argentina (94)	1–0	2018 World Cup qualif.	Messi	
207	31 Aug 2017	Montevideo	Centenario	Draw (51)	0–0	2018 World Cup qualif.		
208	18 Nov 2019	Tel Aviv	Bloomfield	Draw (52)	2–2	Friendly	Agüero, Messi	Cavani, Suárez
209	18 Jun 2021	Brasília	Mané Garrincha	Argentina (95)	1–0	2021 Copa América	G. Rodríguez	
210	10 Oct 2021	Buenos Aires	River Plate	Argentina (96)	3–0	2022 World Cup qualif.	Messi, De Paul, L. Martínez	
211	12 Nov 2021	Montevideo	Campeón del Siglo	Argentina (97)	1–0	2022 World Cup qualif.	Di María	
212	16 Nov 2023	Buenos Aires	La Bombonera	Uruguay (63)	2–0	2026 World Cup qualif.		Araújo, Núñez
213	21 Mar 2025	Montevideo	Centenario	Argentina (98)	1–0	2026 World Cup qualif.	Almada	
214	14 Nov 2026	Buenos Aires	Estadio Alberto J. Armando	Uruguay (64)	1–2	Friendly	Alvarez	Balerdi (o.g.), Araújo

=== Unrecognised matches ===
#	Date	City	Venue	Winner	Score	Goals (Arg)	Goals (Uru)
1 (Note: Not organised by AUF and AFA but by local club Albion. Neither the AFA nor the AUF include this match in their list of internationals.)	16 May 1901	Montevideo	Albion FC	Argentina	3–2	Leslie, Dickinson, Anderson	Céspedes, Poole

== Titles overview ==
=== Official competitions ===
Competition	Argentina	Uruguay
FIFA World Cup	3	2
Olympics (Note: Note: Only the Olympic from 1908 to 1948 are considered senior official titles: .)	0	2
FIFA Confederations Cup	1	0
Copa América	16	15
Panamerican Championship	1	0
CONMEBOL–UEFA Cup of Champions	2	0
Total Titles	23	19

=== Friendly competitions ===
All the tournaments played between both countries exclusively:

Competition	Argentina	Uruguay
Copa Lipton	17	11
Copa Newton	17	11
Copa Honor Arg.	7	3
Copa Honor Uru.	5	8
Copa Mignaburu	5	0
Copa Rivadavia Gómez	3	2
Total	55	36

== Clubs ==
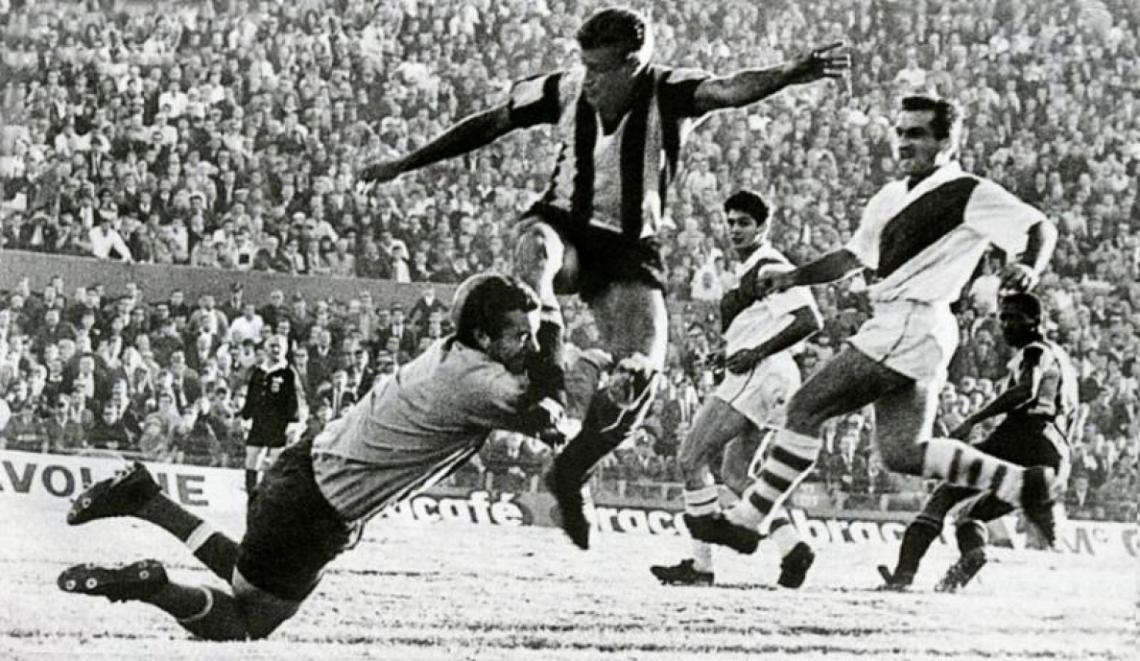
Peñarol vs River Plate, 1960 Copa Libertadores Final

At club level, Argentine and Uruguayan teams always had a strong rivalry since the first international competition in Río de la Plata, the Tie Cup, was held in 1900. Other competitions played by teams from both associations include the Copa de Honor Cousenier (1905–1920) and Copa Aldao (1913–1955). Played (although irregularly) until 1955, the Copa Aldao is seen today as the first stepping-stone into the creation of Copa Libertadores, the highest level of competition in South American club football, in 1960. In 2015, CONMEBOL recognized the Aldao Cup as the first official international professional football cup in South America. By the first years of football in Río de la Plata, the more stronger sides of club football in Argentina were Rosario A.C., Belgrano A.C. and Alumni, in which they played memorable matches against Uruguayan teams CURCC, Montevideo Wanderers and Nacional.

Argentine and Uruguayan football clubs have been successful in both intercontinental and international levels, respectfully, throughout the history of the sport. In Argentina, the Big Five (Boca Juniors, Independiente, Racing Club de Avellaneda, River Plate, and San Lorenzo de Almagro) have been successful and popularly recognized football clubs since the introduction of football to the country, whereas Peñarol and Club Nacional de Football have been dominant clubs of Uruguay. In Argentina, as of 2024, out of the 134 editions of the Argentine Primera División, 122 of the champions were of the Big Five; River Plate (38), Boca Juniors (35), Racing Club (18), Independiente (16), and San Lorenzo (15). Peñarol and Nacional have won the Uruguayan Primera División a total of 100 times out of the league's 121 editions; Peñarol have won the league 51 times and Nacional with 49.

As of 2024, 54 of the 64 finals of the Copa Libertadores have featured an Argentine or Uruguayan club; Argentine clubs have seen 38 finals appearances, with 25 of them coming out as champions, whereas Uruguayan clubs were featured in 16 finals, winning 8 of them. The first Copa Libertadores in 1960 featured Peñarol against Club Olimpia, in which Peñarol came out victorious in a 2–1 series, led by South American football legends such as Luis Cubilla, Néstor Gonçalves, and Alberto Spencer. Peñarol would eventually win back-to-back the following year in 1961 by defeating Palmeiras in the finals and would also reach the finals in 1962, but would fall short to Santos from a three-peat. In the 1963 edition, Boca Juniors would become the first Argentine team to reach the Copa Libertadores finals, but would also lose to Santos.

From the 1964 until the 1975 Copa Libertadores, the champions of the tournament were either an Argentine or Uruguayan club. This 11-year period would showcase Independiente's rise to dominance, as the team would win the 1964 and 1965 Copa Libertadores by defeating both Peñarol and Nacional in the finals, and would complete a four-peat by winning the 1972, 1973, 1974, and 1975 editions. This era of dominance was led by club legends that featured the likes of Ricardo Bochini, Ricardo Pavoni, and Miguel Ángel Santoro. In addition, this time period also featured Peñarol's second championship win in 1966, along with Racing Club's and Nacional's first championships in 1967 and 1971. By 1976, the first Brazilian club since Santos won in 1963 would come out as champions, as Cruzeiro narrowly defeated River Plate in a 3–2 victory. The following year, however, Boca Juniors would become champions for the first time after their defeat to Santos fourteen years prior by defeating defending champions Cruzeiro in a decisive penalty shoot-out. Boca Juniors would defend their title in the next years edition, as they defeated Deportivo Cali in a 4–0 series, but would lose to Club Olimpia in the 1979 Copa Libertadores.

Two moments of Argentine v Uruguayan club matches in Copa Libertadores: (left): River v Peñarol (1982), and Nacional v Newell's (final of the 1988 edition)

The early 1980s presented Uruguayan dominance, as Nacional would win their second title in the 1980 Copa Libertadores by defeating Internacional de Porto Alegre, and Peñarol reaching the finals back-to-back in the 1982 and 1983 editions, winning the former against C.D. Cobreloa. Thereafter, Argentine and Uruguayan clubs would win the tournament on five consecutive occasions between 1984 and 1988, during which Colombian club América de Cali, considered one of the most dominant clubs of the 1980s with famous players including Argentine footballers Ricardo Gareca, Carlos Ischia and Julio Falcioni, would reach the finals on three consecutive occasions (1985, 1986, and 1987), but would lose in each one; River Plate and Peñarol would win the 1986 and 1987 editions. In the 1988 Copa Libertadores, Nacional would defeat Newell's Old Boys in the final, the first Argentine-Uruguayan final since 1970. This would be the last time a Uruguayan club, aside from Nacional's win of the 1989 Copa Interamericana against Hondurean Olimpia, would win an intercontinental or international championship as of 2024, and wouldn't be until 1994 for any Argentine club. Newell's Old Boys would appear again in the finals of the 1992 Copa Libertadores, but would come up short against São Paulo FC. In 1996 Copa Libertadores, captained by Uruguayan and club legend Enzo Francescoli, River Plate would win their second championship in a rematch with América de Cali, ten years after their 1986 encounter.

With the arrival of Carlos Bianchi in 1998, Boca Juniors established themselves as a dominant team in South American football and ushered in a golden generation that would continue onwards to the turn of the 21st century. After winning several national competitions, led by talented footballers such as, but not limited to, Sebastián Battaglia, Óscar Córdoba, Hugo Ibarra, Martín Palermo, Juan Román Riquelme, and Carlos Tévez, the club would win the 2000 Copa Libertadores after 22 years, defeating Palmeiras in the finals by penalty-shots after two matches ended in a draw (2–2 and 0–0). Boca Juniors became champion again in 2001, defeating Cruz Azul in a penalty shootout; Boca won 1–0 the first final match in Mexico and lost the second game in La Bombonera by the same score. Two years later, they would win their 3rd title in 4 years against Santos FC, as Boca won 2–0 in Buenos Aires and 3–1 in São Paulo. Boca Juniors would reach another Copa Libertadores final in 2004, but lost to Once Caldas in penalties. However, in the 2007 Copa Libertadores, Boca Juniors would win their sixth title, defeating Grêmio FBPA in a 5–0 series.

The 2010s would see the start of Brazilian dominance in the Copa Libertadores, as since 2010, 10 of the 13 finals resulted in a Brazilian club becoming victorious. For instance, in the 2011 Copa Libertadores, Santos FC would defeat Peñarol in a 2–1 series, Peñarol's first finals appearance since 1987 and a rematch from 1962. The following year, in the 2012 Copa Libertadores, Boca Juniors would lose to Corinthians Paulista. However, San Lorenzo would become the first Argentine club since 2009 to win the tournament, as they defeated Nacional Asunción in the 2014 Copa Libertadores. The following year, River Plate, having won the 2014 Copa Sudamericana and beginning to rebuild themselves under the guidance of Marcelo Gallardo, would win the tournament by defeating Tigres UANL. Three years later, River Plate would face-off against their rivals, Boca Juniors, in the 2018 Copa Libertadores finals, which was labeled by The New York Times as the "Final to End All Finals" and the biggest game in Argentine sport history. The final was met with significant fan violence on both sides, and as a result, the second leg was played in the Santiago Bernabéu Stadium in Madrid after a 2–2 draw in the first leg. River would come out victorious in a 3-1 second leg victory. River Plate would return to the finals the following year in 2019, but would lose to CR Flamengo. The 2023 Copa Libertadores final feature Boca Juniors facing off against Fluminense, but the former would lose to the Brazilian side, 2–1.

Although the Copa Sudamericana is more recent, having been inaugurated in 2002, it is still considered an important tournament in South American football. In its history, Argentine clubs have represented in the final 15 times, winning it on 9 occasions. San Lorenzo won the first edition of the tournament by defeating Atlético Nacional in a 4–0 series. River Plate were runners-up the following year, losing to Cienciano in 2003. Thereafter, Boca Juniors would win back-to-back Sudamericanas in 2004 and 2005 by defeating Club Bolívar 2-1 and Pumas UNAM on penalties, 4–3, after a 2–2 series. Independiente would win their first Sudamericana in 2010 by winning on penalties 5–3 after the series came to a draw of 3–3 against Goiás Esporte Clube. They would eventually become Sudamericana champions once again in 2017 by defeating CR Flamengo.

However, aside Argentina's Big Five, other Argentine clubs have rose to international prominence, the most notable of which includes Estudiantes de La Plata, four-time Copa Libertadores winners, having won the tournament three years in a row (1968, 1969, 1970) under the leadership of club legends Carlos Bilardo, who would guide the Argentine national team to their second FIFA World Cup in 1986, and captain Juan Ramón Verón. In 2008, Estudiantes were runners-up in the Copa Sudamericana, having lost to Internacional de Porto Alegre, but would eventually win their fourth Copa Libertadores the following year in 2009, captained by Juan Ramón's son, Juan Sebastián Verón. The club are also former intercontinental champions, defeating Manchester United in the 1968 edition of the cup, and also won the inaugural Copa Interamericana in 1969, beating CONCACAF Champions of the previous year, Deportivo Toluca F.C. In terms of national achievements, Estudiantes are six-time champions of the Argentine Primera División and have recently won several Argentine competitions such as the Copa de la Liga Profesional and the Copa Argentina.

Other Argentine clubs that have seen recent success include ten-time national league champions Club Atlético Vélez Sársfield, who, in 1994, won the Copa Libertadores against São Paulo FC and eventually defeating AC Milan in the Intercontinental Cup. Two years later, the club would win the Interamericana Cup in 1996 against C.S. Cartaginés and the Supercopa Libertadores. Argentinos Juniors are also former Copa Libertadores champions, having won the 1985 edition and eventually winning the Copa Interamericana against Defence Force F.C.

Arsenal de Sarandí, Club Atlético Lanús, and Defensa y Justicia are also former Copa Sudamericana champions, having won the title in 2007, 2013, and 2020, respectively, the latter of which would also win the Recopa Sudamericana in 2020 following that year's Libertadores. Lanús have also won the 1996 Copa CONMEBOL by defeating Independiente Santa Fe in the finals and were runners-up in the 2017 Copa Libertadores. They were the runners-up in Defensa y Justicia's Sudamericana championship win in 2020. Other Argentine clubs that have seen recent accomplishments include 2012 Copa Sudamericana runners-up Club Atlético Tigre, Club Atlético Huracán, who historically have been successful on the national level and have more recently were runners-up in the 2015 Copa Sudamericana, and Club Atlético Colón who reached the finals in the 2019 Copa Sudamericana.

Although Peñarol and Nacional have always been the forefront of Uruguayan football across international competition, no other Uruguayan clubs has won either the Copa Libertadores or the Copa Sudamericana, in part because of the two team's overwhelming support in the country. The biggest teams in the nation, aside from Peñarol and Nacional, have historically been Defensor Sporting, Danubio, and Montevideo Wanderers. Both Defensor Sporting and Danubio are four-time national league champions, whereas Montevideo Wanderers has won three. In recent years, however, clubs such as Liverpool Montevideo and Montevideo City Torque, the latter of which has been owned since April 2017 by the City Football Group, a subsidiary of Abu Dhabi United Group, have seen national and international progress through its promising academies and financial support.

=== Club titles ===
The table below compares titles won by Argentine and Uruguayan clubs since the first official international competition in 1905:

Competition	Argentina	Uruguay
Intercontinental Cup	9	6
Copa Libertadores	25	8
Copa Sudamericana	10	0
Suruga Bank Championship	3	0
Copa Conmebol	3	0
Copa Mercosur	1	0
Supercopa Sudamericana	6	0
Recopa Sudamericana	10	1
Copa Interamericana	7	2
Copa Nicolás Leoz	1	0
Copa Master de Supercopa	1	0
Intercontinental Supercup	0	1
Tie Cup	13	6
Copa de Honor Cousenier	4	9
Copa Aldao	10	4
Total	102	37

=== Finals between clubs in South American competition ===
Competition	Nationality	Winner	Runner-up	Result
1964 Copa Libertadores	Argentina	Independiente	Nacional	0–0, 1–0
1965 Copa Libertadores	Argentina	Independiente	Peñarol	1–0, 1–3, 4–1
1966 Copa Libertadores	Uruguay	Peñarol	River Plate	2–0, 2–3, 4–2
1967 Copa Libertadores	Argentina	Racing Club	Nacional	0–0, 0–0, 2–1
1969 Copa Libertadores	Argentina	Estudiantes (LP)	Nacional	1–0, 2–0
1970 Copa Libertadores	Argentina	Estudiantes (LP)	Peñarol	1–0, 0–0
1971 Copa Libertadores	Uruguay	Nacional	Estudiantes (LP)	0–1, 1–0, 2–0
1988 Copa Libertadores	Uruguay	Nacional	Newell's Old Boys	0–1, 3–0
1989 Recopa Sudamericana	Uruguay	Nacional	Racing Club	1–0, 0–0

=== Finals between clubs in Río de la Plata competitions ===
AFA / AUF competitions often generalized as Copas Rioplatenses were official international competitions contested only by Argentine and Uruguayan clubs before the creation of official South American club competitions by CONMEBOL. Unofficial and unfinalized editions were excluded.

The following is a list of all the matches played:

Year	Competition	Winner	Runner-up	Results
1904	Tie Cup	(Argentina) Rosario A.C.	(Uruguay) CURCC	3–2
1905	Tie Cup	(Argentina) Rosario A.C.	(Uruguay) CURCC	4–3
1905	Copa Honor Cousenier	(Uruguay) Nacional	(Argentina) Alumni	3–2
1906	Copa Honor Cousenier	(Argentina) Alumni	(Uruguay) Nacional	2–2, 3–1
1907	Tie Cup	(Argentina) Alumni	(Uruguay) CURCC	3–1
1907	Copa Honor Cousenier	(Argentina) Belgrano A.C.	(Uruguay) CURCC	2–1
1908	Tie Cup	(Argentina) Alumni	(Uruguay) Wanderers	4–0
1908	Copa Honor Cousenier	(Uruguay) Wanderers	(Argentina) Quilmes	2–0
1909	Tie Cup	(Argentina) Alumni	(Uruguay) CURCC	4–0
1909	Copa Honor Cousenier	(Uruguay) CURCC	(Argentina) San Isidro	4–2
1911	Tie Cup	(Uruguay) Wanderers	(Argentina) San Isidro	2–0
1911	Copa Honor Cousenier	(Uruguay) Peñarol	(Argentina) Newell's Old Boys	2–0
1912	Tie Cup	(Argentina) San Isidro	(Uruguay) Nacional	1–0
1912	Copa Honor Cousenier	(Uruguay) River Plate	(Argentina) Racing Club	2–1
1913	Tie Cup	(Uruguay) Nacional	(Argentina) San Isidro	1–0
1913	Copa Honor Cousenier	(Argentina) Racing	(Uruguay) Nacional	1–1, 3–2
1914	Tie Cup	(Argentina) River Plate	(Uruguay) Bristol	1–0
1915	Tie Cup	(Uruguay) Nacional	(Argentina) Porteño	2–0
1915	Copa Honor Cousenier	(Uruguay) Nacional	(Argentina) Racing	2–0
1916	Copa Aldao	(Uruguay) Nacional	(Argentina) Racing	2–1
1916	Tie Cup	(Uruguay) Peñarol	(Argentina) Rosario Central	3–0
1916	Copa Honor Cousenier	(Uruguay) Nacional	(Argentina) Rosario Central	6–1
1917	Copa Aldao	(Argentina) Racing	(Uruguay) Nacional	2–2, 2–1
1917	Tie Cup]	(Uruguay) Wanderers	(Argentina) Independiente	4–0
1917	Copa Honor Cousenier	(Uruguay) Nacional	(Argentina) Racing	3–1
1918	Copa Aldao	(Argentina) Racing	(Uruguay) Peñarol	2–1
1918	Tie Cup	(Uruguay) Wanderers	(Argentina) Porteño	2–1
1918	Copa Honor Cousenier	(Argentina) Peñarol	(Argentina) Independiente	4–0
1919	Copa Aldao	(Uruguay) Nacional	(Argentina) Boca Juniors	3–0
1919	Tie Cup	(Argentina) Boca Juniors	(Uruguay) Nacional	2–0
1920	Copa Aldao	(Uruguay) Nacional	(Argentina) Boca Juniors	2–1
1920	Copa Honor Cousenier	(Argentina) Boca Juniors	(Uruguay) Universal	2–0
1923	Copa Campeonato Río de la Plata	(Argentina) San Lorenzo	(Uruguay) Wanderers	1–0
1927	Copa Aldao	(Argentina) San Lorenzo	(Uruguay) Rampla Juniors	1–0
1936	Copa Aldao	(Argentina) River Plate	(Uruguay) Peñarol	5–1
1937	Copa Aldao	(Argentina) River Plate	(Uruguay) Peñarol	5–2
1939	Copa Aldao	(Argentina) Independiente	(Uruguay) Nacional	5–0
1941	Copa Aldao	(Argentina) River Plate	(Uruguay) Nacional	6–1, 1–1
1945	Copa Aldao	(Argentina) River Plate	(Uruguay) Peñarol	2–1, 3–2
1945	Copa Escobar-Gerona	(Argentina) Boca Juniors and (Uruguay) Nacional (Note: Title shared after both teams tied on points (2–2).)		1–2, 3–2
1946	Copa Escobar-Gerona	(Argentina) Boca Juniors	(Uruguay) Nacional	3–2, 6–3
1947	Copa Aldao	(Argentina) River Plate	(Uruguay) Nacional	4–3, 3–1

== See also ==
- Argentina–Uruguay relations
