= 1915 Argentine Primera División final =

1915 Primera División final
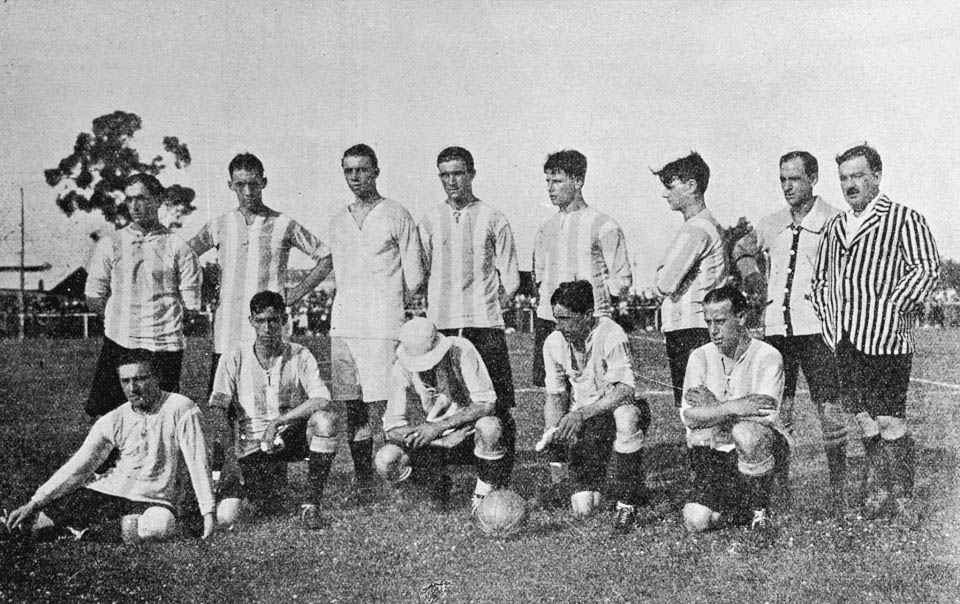
- Racing Club, champions
- Event: 1915 Primera División
Racing	San Isidro
1	0
- Date: 6 January 1916
- Venue: Independiente Stadium, Crucecita
- Referee: Héctor Alfano

The 1915 Argentine Primera División final was the match that determined the winner of 1915 season of Argentine Primera División. The final was contested by Racing and San Isidro, in order to decide a champion after both teams had finished tied on points (46 in 24 matches played) at the end of the tournament. Although Racing has a much larger goal difference than its rival (+90 vs +60) the Association decided to held a match to decide a champion.

It was the 2nd. league final contested by both clubs, only two years after they had first met. It was held in Estadio Crucecita of the homonymous city, home venue of C.A. ndependiente. Racing won their third consecutive league title after defeating San Isidro 1–0 with a goal by Alberto Marcovecchio.

== Qualified teams ==
Team	Previous finals app.
Racing	**1913**
San Isidro	1913

Bold indicates winning years

== Venue ==
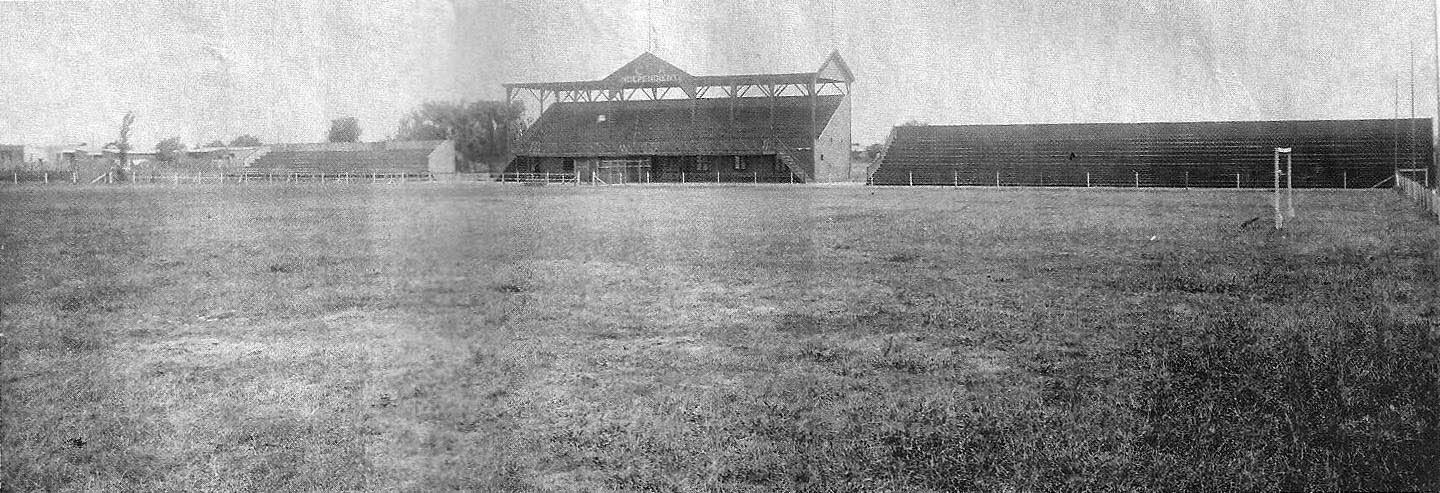
Independiente stadium, venue

The final was held in Estadio Crucecita, located in the Crucecita town in Avellaneda Partido and home venue of Racing's arch-rival Club Atlético Independiente. The stadium operated from 1911 to 1928, when the club acquired a land to build a new stadium which would be opened in 1928.

Crucecita had a capacity of 10,000 spectators. After the stadium was dismantled, some of its wooden grandstands were placed at the new stadium.

== Background ==
Both teams remained unbeaten at the end of the regular season. Racing and San Isidro also equalled on record (22 wins, and 2 draws) but the team of Avellaneda got a larger goal difference than its rival (scored 96 goals, an average of 4 goals per match). Racing achieved a considerable number of landslide wins over their rivals, some of the most notable were over Boca Juniors (6–0), Banfield (6–0), Hispano Argentino (7–0), River Plate (3–0), Estudiantil Porteño (6–0), Tigre (6–0), Porteño (4–0), Estudiantes de La Plata (4–0), Kimberley (4–0),Platense (5–0), and Defensores de Belgrano (6–0). The largest win was over Argentino de Quilmes (8–1).

On the other hand, San Isidro also achieved a number of highlighted wins, some of they were over Independiente (2–0), San Lorenzo (3–0), Belgrano A.C. (7–1), Tigre (4–1), Defensores de Belgrano (5–0), Kimberley (6–0), Estudiantes LP (3–0), and Hispano Argentino (5–0). Nevertheless the most notable of them was the 7–0 over Boca Juniors on October 10, which remains as the Xeneize's worst defeat ever in Primera División competitions.

== Match details ==
1915 Primera División Final
6 Jan 1916

Racing	1–0	San Isidro
Marcovecchio 6'	Report

Estadio Independiente, Crucecita
Referee: Héctor Alfano

**Racing**
**San Isidro**

GK	Syla Arduino
DF	Salvador Presta
DF	Armando Reyes
MF	Ángel Betular
MF	Francisco Olazar
MF	Ricardo Pepe
FW	Zoilo Canavery
FW	Alberto Ohaco
FW	Alberto Marcovecchio
FW	Juan Hospital
FW	Juan Perinetti

GK	Carlos T. Wilson
DF	J. Iriarte
DF	A. Bruno
MF	A. Olivieri
MF	José Morroni
MF	G. Badaracco
FW	J. Fernández
FW	E. Fernández
FW	S. Sayanes
FW	A. Marini
FW	I. Alzúa

=== Aftermath ===
The 1915 title was the third of seven consecutive league titles won by Racing Club, a record that still stands to date. Those achievements made the club be recognised as the successor of British-origin club Alumni, which had been the most successful football team until its dissolution in 1911.

The large number of titles won during the 1910s included five Copa Ibarguren, five Copa de Honor MCBA, two Copa de Honor Cousenier and one Copa Aldao. Those achievements made Racing become the most successful team of the decade with a total of 20 titles won. That big success plus their style of play (which established what was called the creole football to diffenciate it from the British style introduced by Alumni, Lomas, or Quilmes during the first years of Argentine football) earned Racing Club the nickname The Academy, which still remains nowadays as their distinctive landmark nickname.
