= 1913 Tie Cup final =

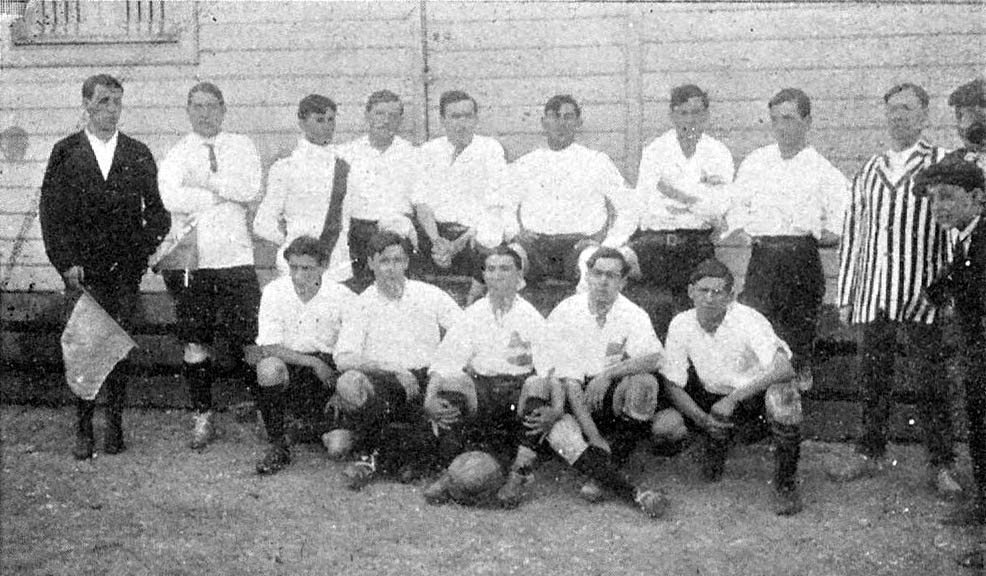
- Winning team Nacional
- Event: 1913 Tie Cup
San Isidro	Nacional
(Argentina)	(Uruguay)
0	1
- Date: 29 October 1913
- Venue: Estadio Racing Club, Avellaneda
- Referee: Tomás Forné (Argentina)

The 1913 Tie Cup final was the final match to decide the winner of the Tie Cup, the 14th international competition organised by the Argentine and Uruguayan Associations. The final was contested by the Argentine San Isidro and Uruguayan Nacional.

In the match, played at Estadio Racing Club in Avellaneda, Nacional beat San Isidro 1–0, taking revenge for the previous edition and also winning its first Tie Cup tournament.

== Qualified teams ==
Team	Qualification	Previous final app.
(Argentina) San Isidro	1913 Copa de Competencia (A) champions	2 (1911, **1912**)
(Uruguay) Nacional	1913 Copa de Competencia (U) champions	1 (1912)

- **Bold** indicates winning years

== Match ==
=== Summary ===
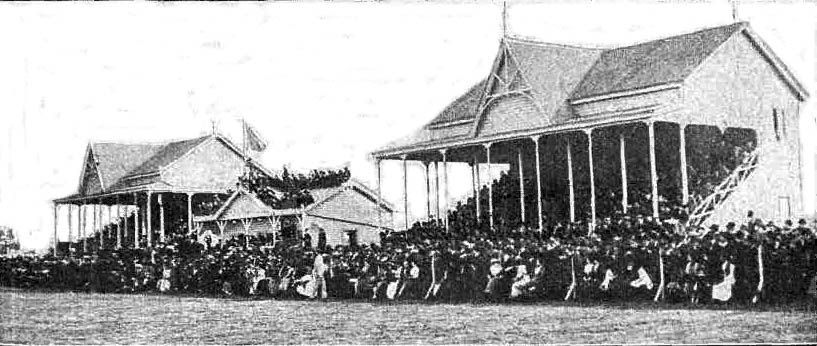
Estadio Racing Club, venue

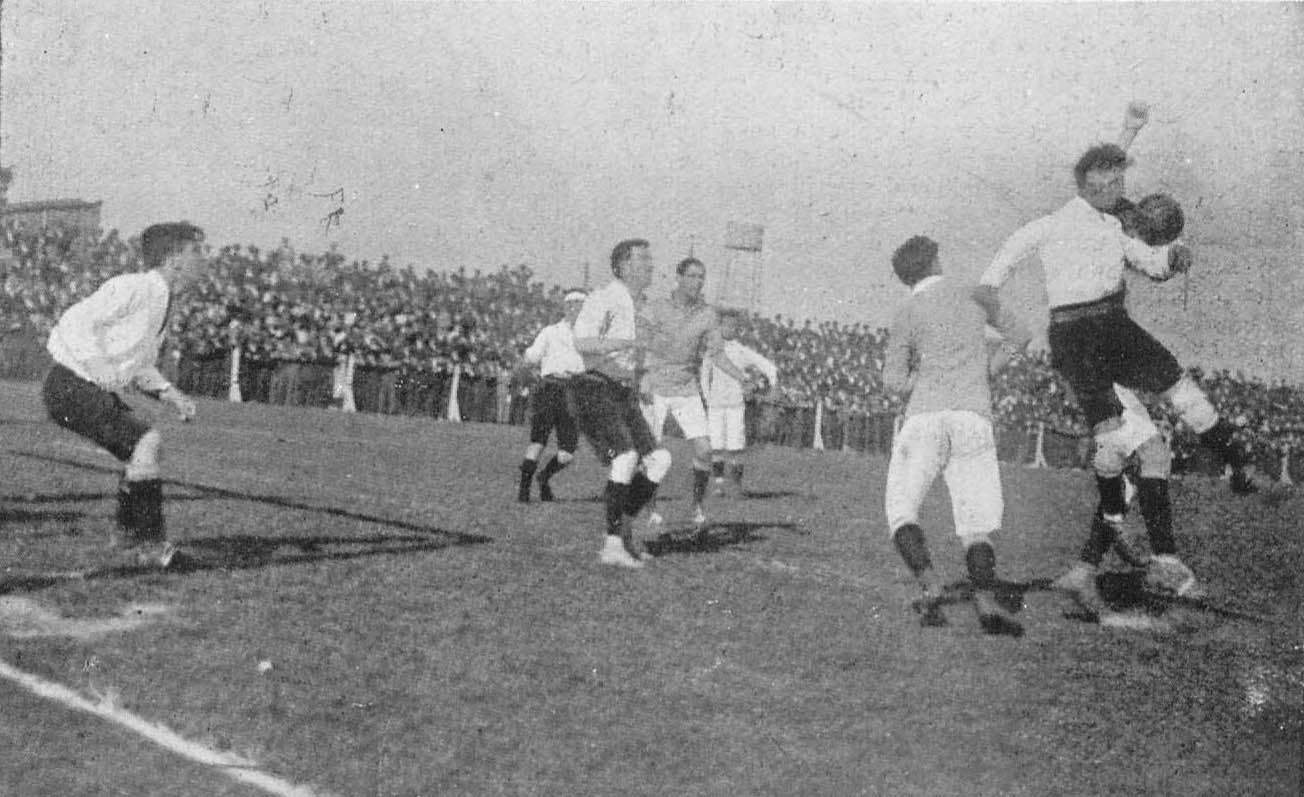
A moment of the game

San Isidro earned its place in the final after having won the 1913 Copa de Competencia Jockey Club, where the squad beat Newell's Old Boys (4–2 in Rosario), Boca Juniors (2–1 in San Isidro), Banfield (4–1 also in San Isidro) and Racing in the final (2–0).

The match was held Estadio Racing Club on 29 October, 1913. During the first 30 minutes of the game, both teams matched in strength with no clear dominance for neither of the two, although Nacional made some attempts through Lucio Gorla and Ricardo Vallarino –that were saved by goalkeeper Carlos Wilson– and a shot by Martín Lázaro that defender J. Morroni stopped just on the goal line The only goal was at 37 minutes, when goalkeeper Wilson stopped a shot by Gorla, but the rebound came to José María Seoane, who scored for the 1–0

In the second half, Nacional dominated their rivals during the first 10 minutes, then San Isidro took control of the game, fiercely attacking in search of the equalizer. The Argentine team's attempts were well controlled by backs Castellino and Crocker, who clear the ball away from their own goal a thoushand times, while goalkeeper Demarchi made two key saves to keep his goal scoreless. As referee Tomás Forné made the final whistle, and Nacional achieved their second international title

=== Details ===
1913 Tie Cup Final
29 October 1913

San Isidro (Argentina)	0–1	(Uruguay) Nacional
	Report	Seoane 37'

Estadio Racing Club, Avellaneda
Referee: Tomás Forné (Argentina)

**San Isidro**	**Nacional**

GK	(Argentina) Carlos Wilson
DF	(Argentina) J. Iriarte
DF	(Argentina) J. Bello
MF	(Argentina) J. Goodfellow
MF	(Argentina) J. Morroni
MF	(Argentina) A. Olivari
FW	(Argentina) E. Fernández
FW	(Argentina) J. Rossi
FW	(Argentina) Spocok
FW	(Argentina) R. Hulme
FW	(Argentina) A. R. Meira

GK	(Uruguay) Santiago Demarchi
DF	(Uruguay) Francisco Castelino
DF	(Uruguay) Federico Crocker
MF	(Uruguay) Ángel Landoni
MF	(Uruguay) Abdón Porte
MF	(Uruguay) Alfredo Foglino
FW	(Uruguay) Martín Lázaro
FW	(Uruguay) Lucio Gorla
FW	(Uruguay) Pablo Dacal
FW	(Uruguay) Ricardo Vallarino
FW	(Uruguay) José María Seoane
