= Estadio Libertadores de América =

Stadium in Avellaneda, Argentina

Liberators of the Americas Stadium
- Estadio Libertadores de América

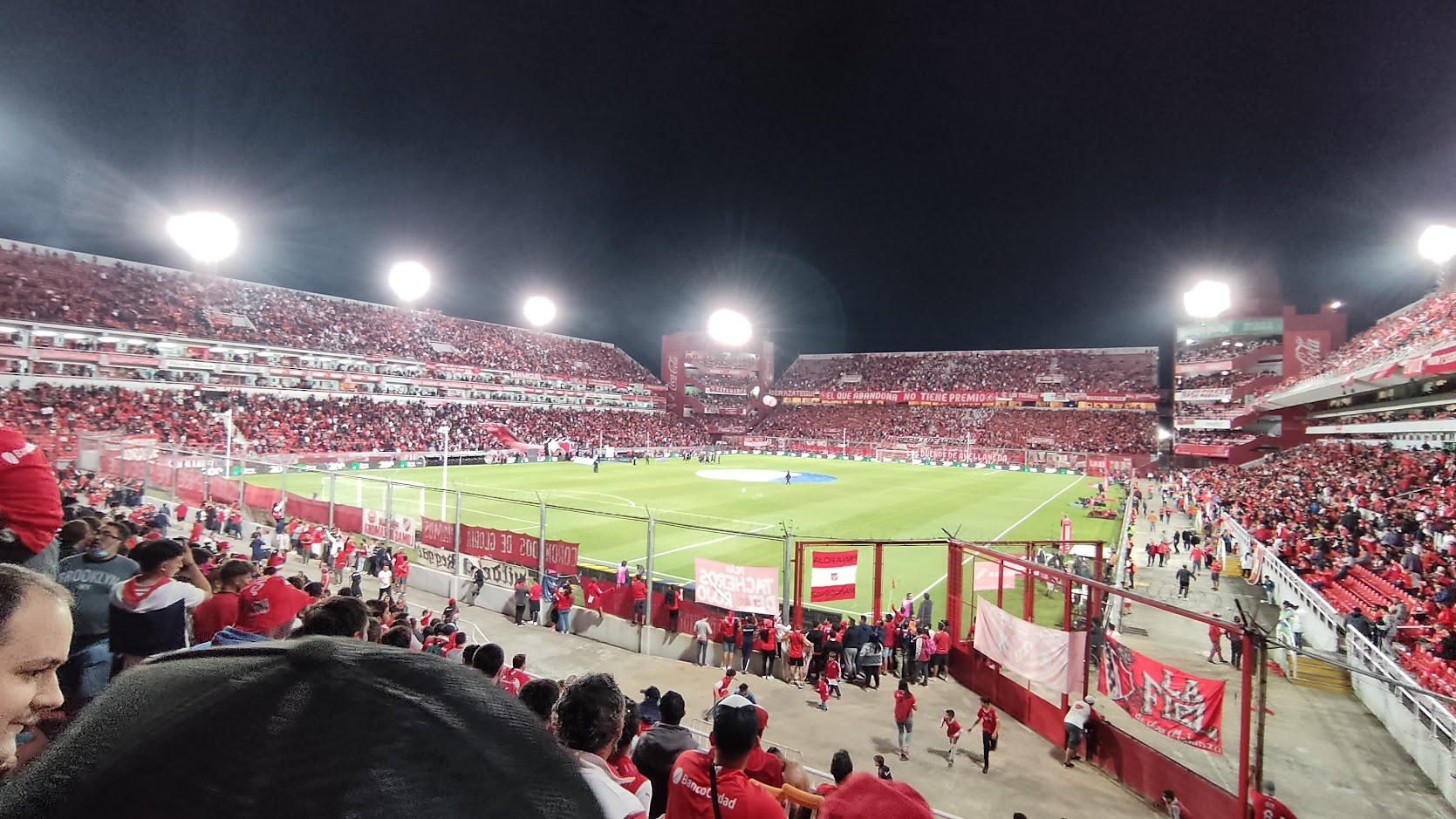
- Interior view of the stadium, 2022
- Interactive map of Liberators of the Americas Stadium
- Full name: Estadio Libertadores de América-Ricardo Enrique Bochini
- Former names: Estadio Libertadores de América (2009–2021)
- Address: Ricardo Bochini 751; Avellaneda; Argentina
- Coordinates: 34°40′13″S 58°22′15″W
- Owner: C.A. Independiente
- Capacity: 52360; 52360 (international)
- Type: Stadium
- Surface: Grass
- Screen: yes

Construction
- Opened: 29 October 2009; 16 years ago
- Cost: US$ 50 million
- Project manager: Ezequiel Dorado

Tenant
- Independiente (2009–present)

Website
- independiente.com.ar/estadio

The Estadio Libertadores de América – Ricardo Enrique Bochini (Spanish pronunciation: [estaðjo lˌiβeɾtaðˈoɾes dˈe ˌameɾˈika ɾɾikˈaɾðo enrˈike bot͡ʃˈini]; lit. 'Liberators of the Americas – Ricardo Enrique Bochini Stadium', named after the Copa Libertadores tournament and footballer Ricardo Bochini) is an association football stadium in Avellaneda, Argentina. It is the home of Independiente, located on the same site as the historic La Doble Visera stadium.

Inaugurated in October 2009, the stadium was reopened after having been refurbished. The current capacity of the venue is 42,069.

== History ==
Before settling in Avellaneda in 1906, Independiente played at various grounds in Buenos Aires neighborhoods like Flores, La Paternal, and Recoleta, including a site later used by River Plate at Alvear and Tagle. In 1906, Independiente rented its first field in Crucecita, Avellaneda, staying until 1911. Then, it built a stadium at Mitre and Lacarra, its home until 1928. That year, Independiente opened La Doble Visera, just three blocks from Racing’s stadium. It was Argentina’s first concrete stadium and the third worldwide, hosting major national and international successes and serving early on as Argentina’s main national team venue.

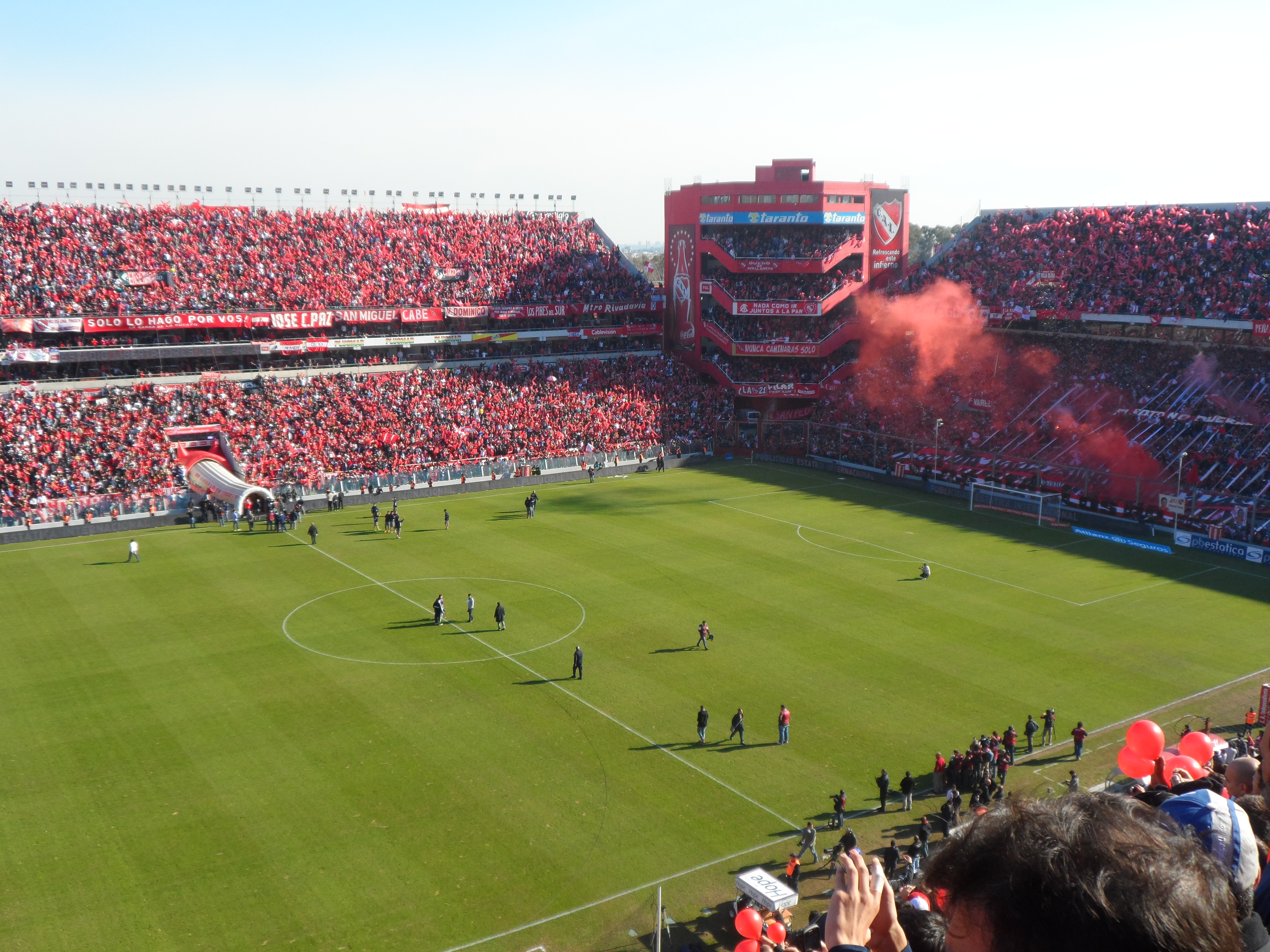
The new Libertadores de América Stadium during a football match in 2014

At the end of 2005, president of Independiente, Julio Comparada, announced the project to build a new stadium. Works would be financed with the incoming (EU 23 million) from the sold of raising star Sergio Agüero to Spanish club Atlético Madrid. Agüero had played only 52 matches in Primera División before being traded. Other transactions made by the club (such as the selling of goalkeeper Oscar Ustari and striker Germán Denis) also helped finance the construction of the new venue, which also led some controversy due to its cost, estimated in US$ 50 million, which largely exceeded the initial cost announced in 2006.

In December 2006 the stadium was shuttered, and demolished the following year. The rebuilt stadium was inaugurated on 28 October 2009, in a match against Colón de Santa Fe of the Argentine Primera División championship (2009 Apertura). The new, European-style stadium has a capacity of roughly 42,069 seats. It also featured large digital screens, a restaurant with panoramic view of the pitch, a club museum, offices and conferential facilities, and a shopping centre.

In July 2014, one of the objectives was the completion of the court. Thus it was that, in the 2-1 victory against Racing Club on August 31 for the fifth date of the Transition Tournament, the "Bochini Alta" grandstand could be seen finished.

In May 2015, the construction of "Garganta 3" began and the "Bochini Baja" grandstand was also completed, plus the boxes and also the Press sector. On 16 December 2016 when facing Banfield, Independiente completely inaugurated the "Libertadores de América".

On December 5, 2021, as a tribute to whom is regarded as the greatest idol of the club, Ricardo Bochini, the stadium was renamed "Estadio Libertadores de América-Ricardo Bochini". Bochini, who has the record of matches played for the club (714 between 1972 and 1991), (Note: Only in Primera División, Bochini holds the record of 637 matches.) was honored before the 24th. round of 2021 Primera División, where Independiente played v San Lorenzo. Bochini also played for a representative of Independiente (formed by former players of the club) v a similar team of San Lorenzo, scoring one goal.

On September 17, 2022, the stadium hosted a rugby union match for the first time, when Argentina played v South Africa after the team was forced to switch the venue in the 5th. round of 2022 Rugby Championship because of the poor condition of José Amalfitani Stadium's pitch.

Independiente drew an average home attendance of 37,753 in the 2024 Argentine Primera División.

== Argentina matches ==
=== Rugby union team ===
The Argentina national rugby team debuted at Independiente in September 2022

| Date | Event | Rival | Res. | Scorers |
|---|---|---|---|---|
| 17 Sep 2022 | 2022 Rugby Championship | South Africa | 20–36 | Moroni (2 tries), Boffelli (2 pen., 1 con.) |
