= 1912 Tie Cup final =

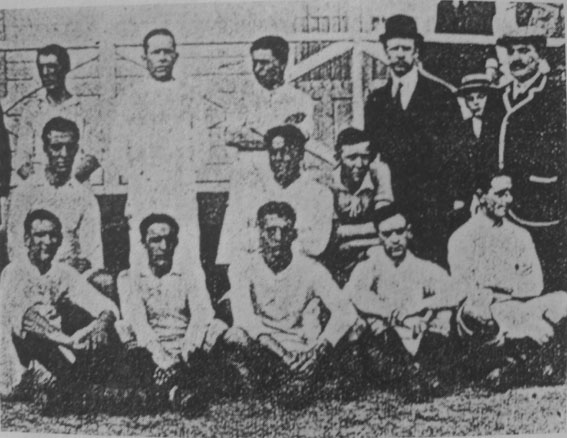
- Team of San Isidro, winners
- Event: 1912 Tie Cup
San Isidro	Nacional
(Argentina)	(Uruguay)
1	0
- Date: 17 November 1912
- Venue: Estadio Racing Club, Avellaneda

The 1912 Tie Cup final was the final match to decide the winner of the Tie Cup, the 13th edition of the international competition organised by the Argentine and Uruguayan Associations together. The final was contested by Argentine San Isidro and Uruguayan Nacional,

In the match, played at Estadio Racing Club in Avellaneda, San Isidro won its first Tie Cup after beating Nacional (which played its first final in this competition) 1–0.

== Qualified teams ==
Team	Qualification	Previous final app.
(Argentina) San Isidro	1912 Copa de Competencia (A) champions	1911
(Uruguay) Nacional	1912 Copa de Competencia (A) champions	(none)

- **Bold** indicates winning years

== Overview ==
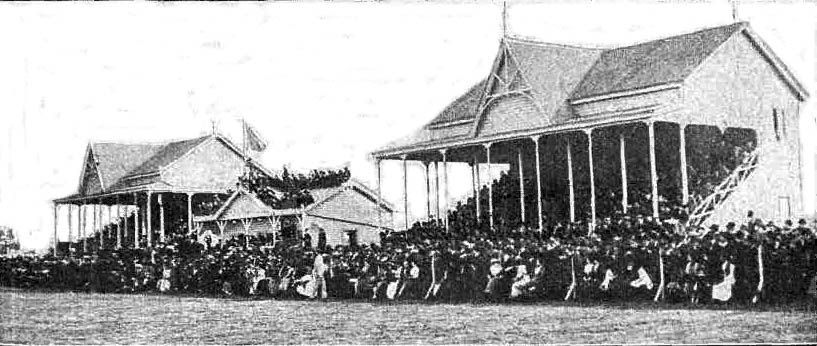
Estadio Racing Club, venue of the final

San Isidro earned its place in the final after having won the 1912 Copa de Competencia Jockey Club, where the squad beat Estudiantes de La Plata (5–0 in Quilmes), Gimnasia y Esgrima de Buenos Aires (the match was not played due to Gimnasia had left AFA soon before to establish dissident FAF so San Isidro directly qualified to the final), and Quilmes (0–0 and 2–1, both games at Racing Club Stadium).

The final was held in Racing Club on November 17, 1912. The Racing field was chosen due to Gimnasia y Esgrima had disjoined the AFA under protest therefore the club would not allow the use of Estadio G.E.B.A. for the occasion. San Isidro scored on 12 minutes, when Alfredo Foglino kicked the ball out of the Nacional penalty area, but the rebound came to Costas that ran forward and shot to score the only goal of the match. In the second half, a penalty kick was awarded to Nacional but Costas missed the shot.

With this win, San Isidro won its first Tie Cup, taking revenge from the previous edition when the squad had lost to Montevideo Wanderers F.C.

== Match details ==
1912 Tie Cup Final
17 November 1912

San Isidro (Argentina)	1–0	(Uruguay) Nacional
Costas 12'	Report

Estadio Racing Club, Avellaneda

**San Isidro**	**Nacional**

GK	(Argentina) Carlos Wilson
DF	(Argentina) J. Bello
DF	(Argentina) A. Olivari
MF	(Argentina) J. Goodfellow
MF	(Argentina) J. Morroni
MF	(Argentina) J. Rossi
FW	(Argentina) E. Fernández
FW	(Argentina) J. Fernández
FW	(Argentina) A. Costas
FW	(Argentina) R. Hulme
FW	(Argentina) A. R. Meira

GK	(Uruguay) Santiago Demarchi
DF	(Uruguay) Francisco Castelino
DF	(Uruguay) Alfredo Foglino
MF	(Uruguay) Ángel Landoni
MF	(Uruguay) Abdón Porte
MF	(Uruguay) José Vanzino
FW	(Uruguay) Emilio Peppo
FW	(Uruguay) Lucio Gorla
FW	(Uruguay) Pablo Dacal
FW	(Uruguay) Ricardo Vallarino
FW	(Uruguay) Alfredo Lista
