= Copa Juan Mignaburu =

- Organising body: (Argentina) AFA (Uruguay) AUF
- Founded: 1935
- Abolished: 1943; 82 years ago
- Region: Argentina, Uruguay
- Number of teams: 2
- Related competitions: Copa Héctor Rivadavia Gómez
- Last champions: Argentina (1943)
- Most successful team(s): Argentina (5 titles)

The Copa Juan Mignaburu was a football friendly competition contested between Argentina and Uruguay national teams between 1935 and 1943. Similar to Copa Premier Honor Argentino, all the editions (five in total) were held in Argentina. The Argentine side largely prevailed over Uruguay, having won all the editions.

The trophy was named after Juan Mignaburu, a politician and football executive who served as coach and president of Club Atlético Independiente between 1911 and 1921, Mignaburu also presided dissident Asociación Amateurs de Football in 1919, where he fiercely opposed professionalism in football. His political career included two periods as major of Avellaneda Partido (1898, 1899–1901).

The cup had its counterpart, Copa Héctor Rivadavia Gómez, held in Uruguay in parallel with this competition.

== List of champions ==
The following list includes all the editions of the Copa Mignaburu:

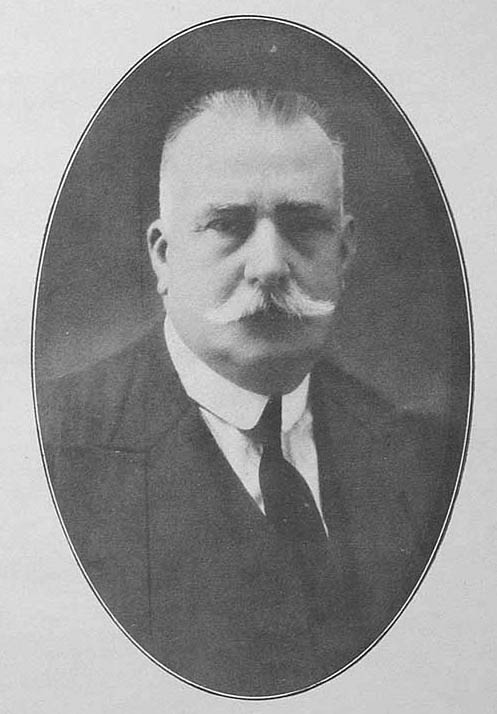
Juan Mignaburu donated the trophy

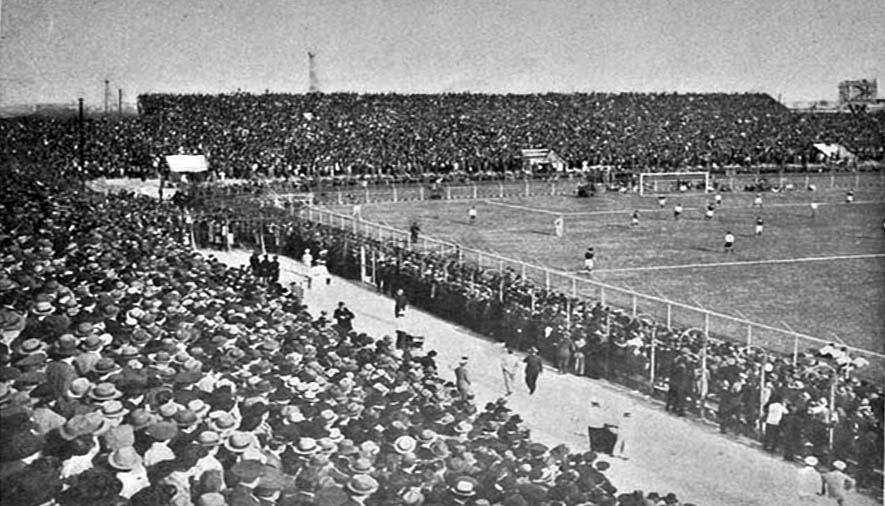
The crowd at Independiente Stadium in 1935, the first edition

Ed.	Year	Champion	Score	City	Venue
1	1935	Argentina	3–0	Avellaneda	Independiente
2	1936	Argentina	1–0	Avellaneda	Independiente
3	1938	Argentina	1–0	Buenos Aires	River Plate
4	1940	Argentina	5–0	Buenos Aires	River Plate
5	1943	Argentina (Note: Argentina was declared winner, as reigning champion.)	3–3	Buenos Aires	River Plate

== Titles by country ==
Team	Titles
Argentina	5
Uruguay	0

== All-time topscorers ==
Player	Goals
(Argentina) Alberto Zozaya	3
(Argentina) Juan Marvezzi	2
(Argentina) José Manuel Moreno	2
(Uruguay) José M. Medina	2

== See also ==
- Argentina–Uruguay football rivalry
