= Copa Héctor Rivadavia Gómez =

- Organising body: (Argentina) AFA (Uruguay) AUF
- Founded: 1935
- Abolished: 1943; 82 years ago
- Region: Argentina, Uruguay
- Number of teams: 2
- Related competitions: Copa Juan Mignaburu
- Last champions: Argentina (1943)
- Most successful team(s): Argentina (3 titles)

The Copa Héctor Rivadavia Gómez was a football friendly competition contested between Argentina and Uruguay national teams. There were five editions of this competitions, held between 1935 and 1943, with all of them won by Argentina.

The trophy was named after Héctor Rivadavia Gómez, Uruguayan journalist and politician, president of the Uruguayan Football Federation and mentor to the creation of the South American Football Confederation (officialised by the Argentina, Brasil, Chile and Uruguay associations in 1916).

The cup has its counterpart, the Copa Juan Mignaburu, held in Argentina in parallel with this competition.

== List of champions ==
The following list includes all the editions of the Cup:

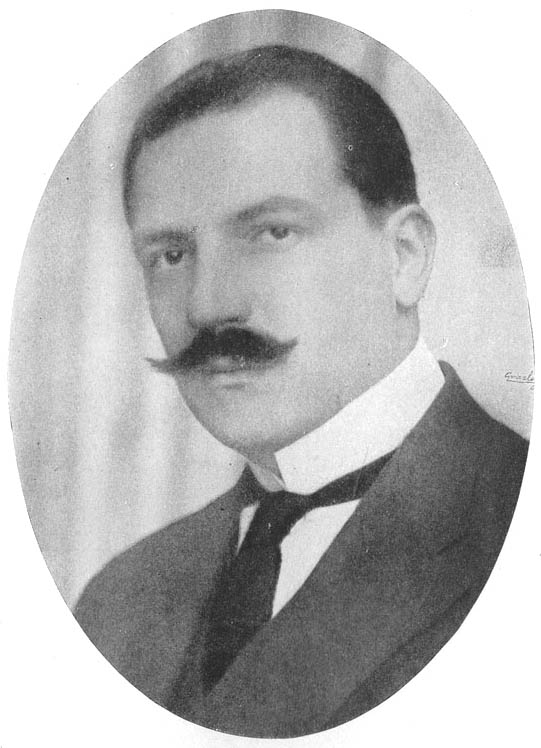
The cup was named after Uruguayan football executive and politician Héctor Rivadavia Gómez

Ed.	Year	Champion	Score	City	Venue
1	1935	Argentina (Note: Argentina was awarded the cup as visiting team.)	1–1	Montevideo	Estadio Centenario
2	1936	Uruguay	2–1	Montevideo	Estadio Centenario
3	1938	Argentina	3–2	Montevideo	Estadio Centenario
4	1940	Uruguay	3–0	Montevideo	Estadio Centenario
5	1943	Argentina	1–0	Montevideo	Estadio Centenario

== Titles by country ==
Team	Titles	Years won
Argentina	3	1935, 1938, 1943
Uruguay	2	1936, 1940

== All-time topscorers ==
Player	Goals
(Argentina) René Pontoni	2
(Uruguay) José M. Medina	2

== See also ==
- Argentina–Uruguay football rivalry
