= La Doble Visera =

Defunct football stadium in Avellaneda, Argentina

Independiente Stadium
- Estadio de Independiente
- La Doble Visera (The Double Visor)

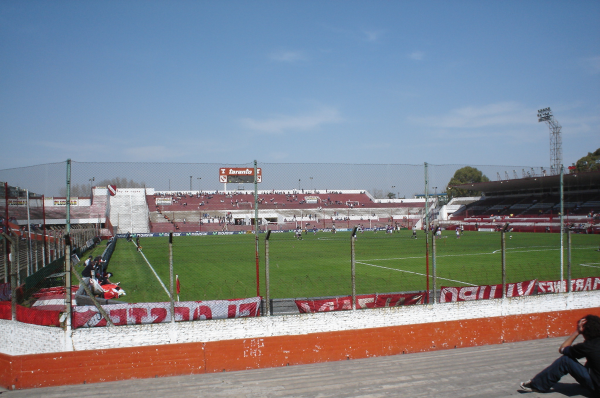
- Interior view of the stadium, 2006
- Interactive map of Independiente Stadium
- Address: Ricardo Bochini 751; Avellaneda; Argentina
- Coordinates: 34°40′13″S 58°22′15″W
- Owner: CA Independiente
- Capacity: 33,500
- Type: Stadium
- Surface: Grass
- Record attendance: 80,670 (Independiente 3–1 Boca Juniors, 1954 Argentine Primera División)

Construction
- Opened: 4 March 1928; 98 years ago
- Expanded: 1930, 1960, 1971
- Demolished: January 2007; 19 years ago
- Rebuilt: 2009
- Project manager: Federico Garófalo

Tenants
- Independiente (1928–2006); Argentina national football team (1929–1961)

Website
- independiente.com.ar/estadio

La Doble Visera (Spanish pronunciation: [la doβle biseɾa]; lit. 'The Double Visor', named after its two flat concrete-roofed stands), officially known as Estadio de Independiente (Spanish pronunciation: [estaðjo dˈe independjente]; lit. 'Independiente Stadium', as it was the home of the team), was an association football stadium in Avellaneda, Argentina. It was the home of Independiente, before the club moved to the current Libertadores de América Stadium, located on the same site.

Inaugurated in 1928, it was built using concrete, becoming the first stadium in Argentina to employ this material and the second in the world after Harvard Stadium in the United States.

== History ==
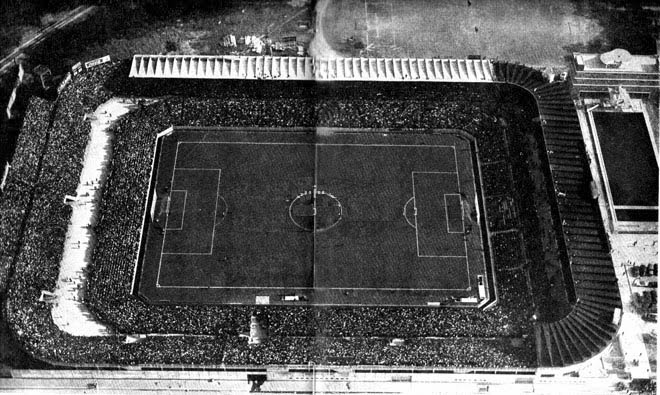
Aerial view of the stadium in 1960

Between 1906, when Independiente moved from Buenos Aires to Avellaneda Partido, and 1928, the team played its home matches at the Crucecita stadium. In 1925, the club's board attempted to purchase the land where that stadium stood, but the sale fell through. As a result, President Pedro Canaveri acquired a vacant, swampy plot located between the tracks of the Buenos Aires Great Southern Railway and just two blocks from Racing’s Alsina and Colón Stadium. The new stadium was built using fireproof materials, following the 1923 fire that had partially destroyed the Crucecita stands, allegedly caused by a short circuit. Nevertheless, for a time, wooden stands from the old stadium were reused.

Built between 1926 and 1928, Independiente’s stadium was erected on swampy land known as the Pantano de Ohaco (Ohaco Swamp), which had to be filled in. Architect Federico Garófalo reportedly drew inspiration from Brazil’s Laranjeiras Stadium or the Gávea Racetrack. The project faced sabotage attempts by Avellaneda’s mayor, but with media support and resistance from club members, construction continued.

The stadium was inaugurated on 4 March 1928, in a friendly match between Independiente and Uruguayan club Peñarol, with Governor of Buenos Aires, Valentín Vergara, as the guest of honour. The first official match played there was on 29 April 1928, when Independiente and Sportivo Buenos Aires tied 0–0. The first international match held at Independiente was on 25 May 1928, when Scottish club Motherwell F.C. played a Liga Rosarina combined during the British club tour of Argentina. Other notable matches of the time include a 4–1 win over Spanish champion FC Barcelona.

The Argentina national football team played a Copa Newton match at Independiente in August 1928, being this the first match of the team at the venue. while the first Avellaneda derby was held in September 1928. One year later, another British club touring Argentina, Chelsea, played v Independiente at the stadium, in June 1929. Other Europeans teams that played there were Italian clubs Torino and Bologna.

In 1930, the pitch was reoriented and new concrete stands increased capacity to 80,000. Lighting towers were added in 1938, and in 1960, a second roofed stand gave rise to the nickname La Doble Visera. Further upgrades included press facilities, irrigation, and lighting improvements.

Due to structural decay, the stadium was closed in 2006 after a masonry collapse. Sergio Agüero’s transfer to Atlético Madrid funded the new stadium project. The final match was on 8 December 2006, with Gimnasia y Esgrima de Jujuy defeating Independiente 2–1; demolition began in January 2007. Only the upper Herminio Sande stand was preserved for the new venue.

== Argentina matches ==
=== Football team ===
The Argentina national football team played several matches at Independiente stadium, mainly in the 1930s and 1940s, with the last match played there in 1961. Below is a list of those matches.

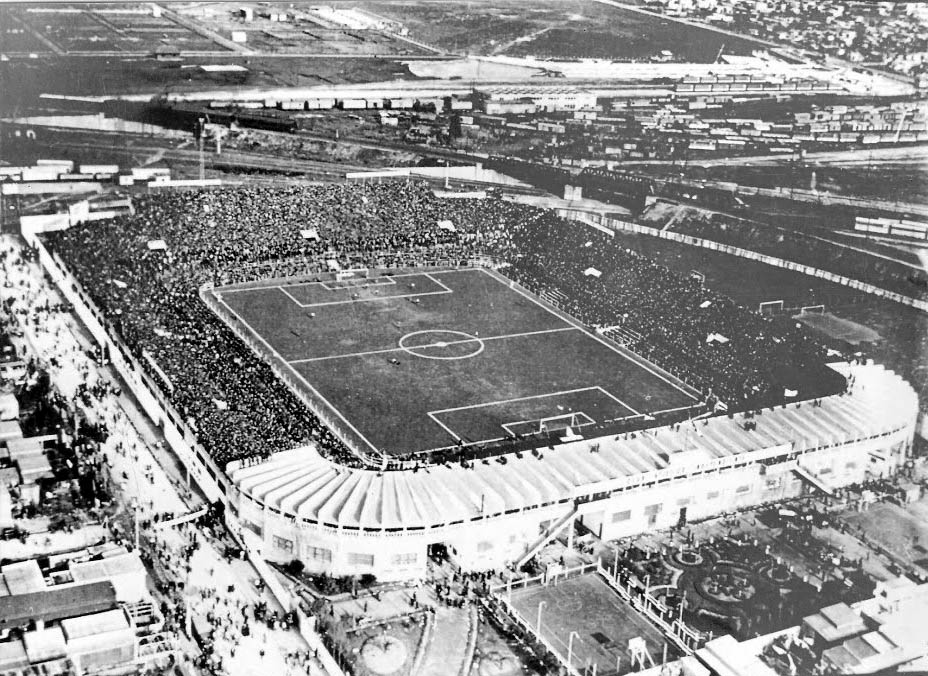
Aerial view of the stadium during the Argentina v Uruguay match, 15 Aug 1935

| Date | Event | Rival | Res. | Scorer/s |
|---|---|---|---|---|
| 30 Aug 1928 | Copa Newton | Uruguay | 1–0 | Seoane |
| 5 Feb 1933 | Friendly | Uruguay | 4–1 | Cherro (4) |
| 15 Aug 1934 | Friendly | Uruguay | 1–0 | Peucelle |
| 15 Aug 1935 | Copa Mignaburu | Uruguay | 3–0 | Zozaya (2), D. García |
| 9 Aug 1936 | Copa Mignaburu | Uruguay | 1–0 | Zozaya |
| 11 Nov 1937 | Copa Lipton | Uruguay | 5–1 | Masantonio (3), Fidel, E. García |
| 18 Feb 1940 | Copa Chevallier Boutell | Paraguay | 3–1 | Ballesteros, Pedernera, Leguizamón |
| 17 Mar 1940 | Copa Roca | Brazil | 5–1 | Baldonedo (2), Masantonio, Peucelle, Cassán |
| 27 Oct 1957 | 1958 WC qualifying | Bolivia | 4–0 | Zárate, Corbatta, Prado, Menéndez |
| 12 Oct 1961 | Friendly | Paraguay | 5–1 | Corbatta (2), Artime, Pagani, Sanfilippo |

| Preceded by Estadio Nacional; Lima | Campeonato Sudamericano; Venue; 1929 | Succeeded by Estadio Nacional; Lima |
| Preceded by Estadio Nacional; Santiago | Campeonato Sudamericano; Venue; 1946 | Succeeded by Estadio George Capwell; Guayaquil |
