= Robert Rudd =

Anglo-Argentine cricketer and football referee

Personal information
- Full name: Robert Whall Rudd
- Born: Q1 1872; Manchester, Lancashire, England
- Died: 21 April 1945 (aged 73); Argentina
- Batting: Unknown

Umpiring information
- FC umpired: 2 (1927)

Career statistics
Competition	First-class
Matches	1
Runs scored	4
Batting average	2.00
100s/50s	–/–
Top score	3
Catches/stumpings	1/–
- Source: Cricinfo, 28 January 2022

Robert Whall Rudd (Q1 1872 — 21 April 1945) was an Anglo-Argentine first-class cricketer and football referee.

Rudd born in England at Manchester in the first quarter of 1872. Having emigrated to Argentina, Rudd refereed two international friendlies between Argentina and Uruguay in 1902 and 1903. Rudd played first-class cricket for Argentina, making a single appearance against the touring Marylebone Cricket Club (MCC) at Buenos Aires in March 1912. Batting twice in the match, he was dismissed for 3 runs in the Argentine first innings by Rockley Wilson, while in their second innings he was for a single run by the same bowler. When the MCC toured Argentina in 1927, he stood as an umpire in two of the four first-class matches played on the tour. Rudd died in Argentina in April 1945.
