= Estadio Crucecita =

Defunct football stadium in Crucecita, Argentina

Crucecita Stadium
- Estadio Crucecita
- Crucecita
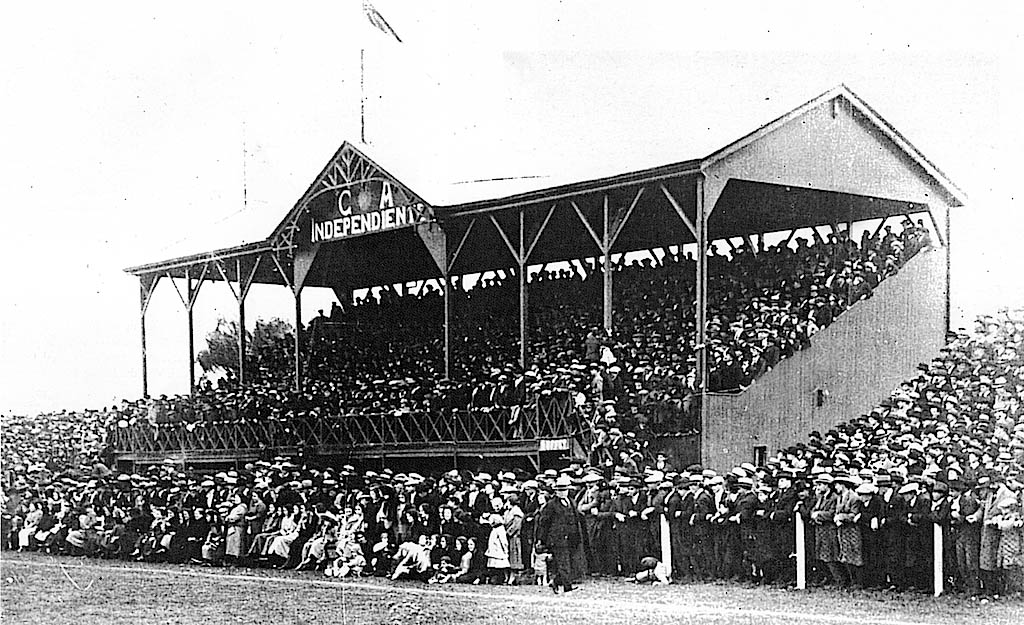
- Official grandstand, c. 1922
- Interactive map of Crucecita Stadium
- Address: Av. Mitre and Lacarra; Crucecita; Argentina
- Owner: C.A. Independiente
- Capacity: 10,000
- Surface: Grass

Construction
- Opened: 9 July 1911; 115 years ago
- Closed: 1928; 98 years ago

Tenant
- Independiente (1911–28)

Estadio Crucecita was a stadium in Crucecita, a town in Avellaneda Partido of Greater Buenos Aires, Argentina. It was the home ground of Club Atlético Independiente before they moved to La Doble Visera in 1928, and was located in the intersection of Avenida Mitre and Lacarra. The stadium held 10,000 spectators.

The stadium operated from 1911 to 1928?, when the club acquired a land to build a new venue.

== History ==
Independiente had previously had a field (also in Crucecita) on Manuel Ocantos and Estanislao del Campo, where the team played from 1907 to 1911. That same year the club moved to Avenida Mitre and Lacarra where it rented a land to build a stadium. The new venue was inaugurated on 9 July 1911 with a match v Estudiantil Porteño, won by Independiente 1–0, with an attendance of 4,000.

Crucecita was the Independiente's venue for their matches in División Intermedia (the second division of Argentine football by then) When Independiente promoted to Primera División and made their debut in the 1912 championship, Crucecita was also the venue for their home matches.

When Racing and San Isidro played a playoff to define the 1915 league champion after both teams had shared the first place, Crucecita was the venue chosen. Racing won 1–0 becoming Primera Divsisión champion.

On 4 August 1923 the official grandstands was destroyed by fire. It was replaced by a grandstand made of iron and wood with no roof. In 1925 Independiente made an offer to buy the land, but it was rejected. After that, the club acquired another land placed on Alsina and Cordero streets, near Racing Club Stadium. On that land, Independiente started construction of their new venue, choosing fireproof materials after the bad experience of 1923.

Some of the wooden grandstands from Crucecita were placed at the new stadium. The new stadium would be inaugurated in 1928.
