= 1911 Tie Cup final =

- Team of Wanderers, champions
- Event: 1911 Tie Cup
San Isidro	Wanderers
(Argentina)	(Uruguay)
0	2
- Date: 1 October 1911
- Venue: Estadio GEBA, Buenos Aires

The 1911 Tie Cup final was the final match to decide the winner of the Tie Cup, the 12th edition of the international competition organised by the Argentine and Uruguayan Associations together. The final was contested by Argentine San Isidro and Uruguayan Wanderers,

In the match, played at Estadio GEBA in Palermo, Buenos Aires, Wanderers won its first Tie Cup after beating San Isidro (which played its first final) 2–0.

== Qualified teams ==
Team	Qualification	Previous final app.
(Argentina) San Isidro	1911 Copa de Competencia (A) champions	(none)
(Uruguay) Wanderers	1911 Copa de Competencia (U) champions	1908

- **Bold** indicates winning years

== Overview ==
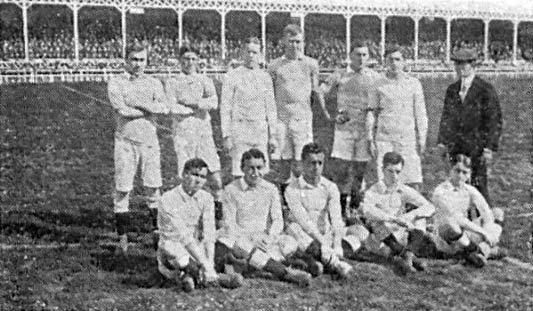
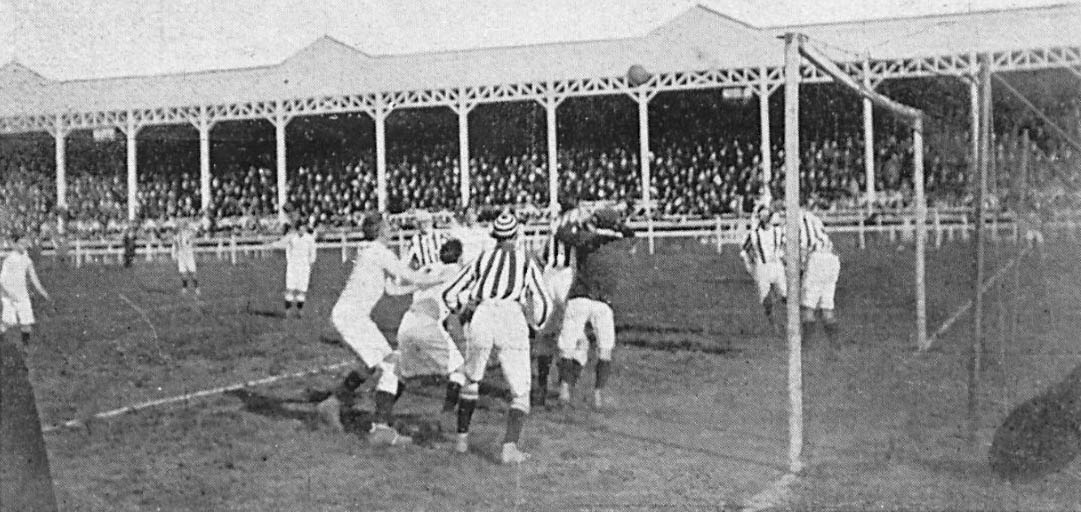
(Left): Team of San Isidro, runner up; (right): scene of the match played at GEBA Stadium

San Isidro earned its place in the final after having won the 1911 Copa de Competencia Jockey Club, where the squad beat San Isidro (3–0), Quilmes (4–0), and Estudiantes de Buenos Aires in the final (4–2 at Racing Club Stadium). The match was held in Gimnasia y Esgrima Stadium in Palermo on October 1, 1911.

In a game fiercely disputed, Wanderers opened the score on 38 minutes when goalkeeper Carlos Tomás Wilson intercepted the ball before winger C. Riss advanced to the goal, throwing it away. Nevertheless, Rébori caught the ball and shot to the goal before Wilson could go back.

In the second half, Wanderers scored again on 34 minutes when Bastos made a long pass after dribbling Malbrán and Olivari. The ball came to Costa who shot for the second goal to secure the result. Thus, Wanderers won its first Tie Cup, which was also the first time an Uruguayan side won the final.

== Match details ==
1911 Tie Cup Final
1 October 1911

San Isidro (Argentina)	0–2	(Uruguay) Wanderers
	Report

Estadio GEBA, Buenos Aires

**San Isidro**	**Wanderers**

GK	(Argentina) Carlos Wilson
DF	(Argentina) J. Bello
DF	(Argentina) A. Olivari
MF	(Argentina) J. Sitdson
MF	(Argentina) J. Goodfellow
MF	(Argentina) M. Malbrán
FW	(Argentina) E. Fernández
FW	(Argentina) R. Malbrán
FW	(Argentina) J. Rossi
FW	(Argentina) R. Hulme
FW	(Argentina) A. R. Meira

GK	(Uruguay) C. Saporiti
DF	(Uruguay) Martín Apesteguy
DF	(Uruguay) Miguel Apesteguy
MF	(Uruguay) L. Altamirano
MF	(Uruguay) A. Rébori
MF	(Uruguay) A. López
FW	(Uruguay) R. Bastos
FW	(Uruguay) C. Bastos
FW	(Uruguay) A. Zumarán
FW	(Uruguay) A. Costa
FW	(Uruguay) C. Riss
