= Crucecita =

Town in Buenos Aires Province, Argentina

- Town
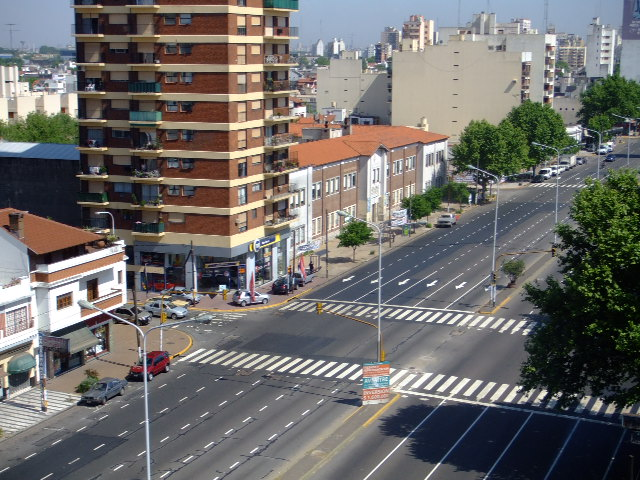

- Location in Greater Buenos Aires
- Coordinates: 34°40′0″S 58°21′0″W
- Country: Argentina
- Province: Buenos Aires
- Partido: Avellaneda
- Elevation: 3 m (9.8 ft)

Population (2001 census [INDEC])
  - Total: 22,000
- CPA Base: B 1872*
- Area code: +54 11

Crucecita is a town of the Avellaneda Partido in Buenos Aires Province, Argentina. It forms part of the Greater Buenos Aires urban agglomeration.

The town is named for the Arroyo de la Crucecita (Crossing Stream) encountered by a 1580 expedition led by Captain Juan de Garay, the founder of modern-day Buenos Aires. The Real Consulado de Buenos Aires ordered a pontoon bridge built over the stream in 1810, and much of the surrounding land later belonged to the Ximenez family. A wave of immigration in Argentina after 1880 led to the southward expansion of the Buenos Aires metro area part Avellaneda, and the first lots in Crucecita were sold to homesteaders in 1887. Following the inaugural of a Ferrocarril Provincial de Buenos Aires station at the site, the Masllorens Brothers factory, a textile maker, was inaugurated in Crucesita by immigrants from Barcelona. The Club Social y Deportivo Unión de Crucecita, the local football club, was established in 1939. Presidente Bartolomé Mitre Avenue connects the suburb to Avellaneda, to the north, and Sarandí, to the south.
