= Carlos Wilson (footballer, born 1889) =

Argentine footballer

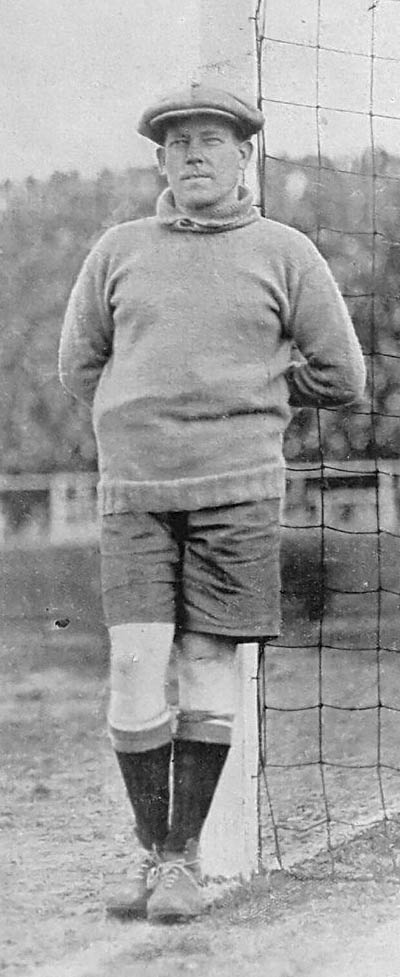
- Wilson in July 1923

Personal information
- Full name: Carlos Tomás Wilson
- Date of birth: 1889
- Place of birth: Rosario, Argentina
- Date of death: 19 September 1952 (aged 62–63)
- Position: Goalkeeper

Senior career*
Years	Team	Apps	(Gls)
1906–1921	San Isidro		

International career
1907–1916	Argentina	26	(0)
Medal record
Men's football
Representing Argentina
South American Championship
Runner-up	1916 Argentina
- * Club domestic league appearances and goals

Carlos Tomás Wilson (1889 – 19 September 1952) was an Argentine footballer who played as a goalkeeper for the Club Atlético San Isidro, having also been called up for the Argentina national team.

== Career ==
Wilson was born in Rosario, Argentina. A son of a British-origin family, he began his career in San Isidro. In 1916, he was part of the team that played the 1915 Argentine Primera División playoff final against Racing Club, which San Isidro lost by 1–0.

In the national team, Carlos Wilson was the successor of José Buruca Laforia as a goalkeeper. He played for Argentina between 1907 and 1916, being part of the team that attended the Copa Centenario Revolución de Mayo, considered predecessor of current Copa América.

Wilson played a total of 26 international matches for Argentina.
