= Fermín Lecea =

Spanish footballer (1905–1989)

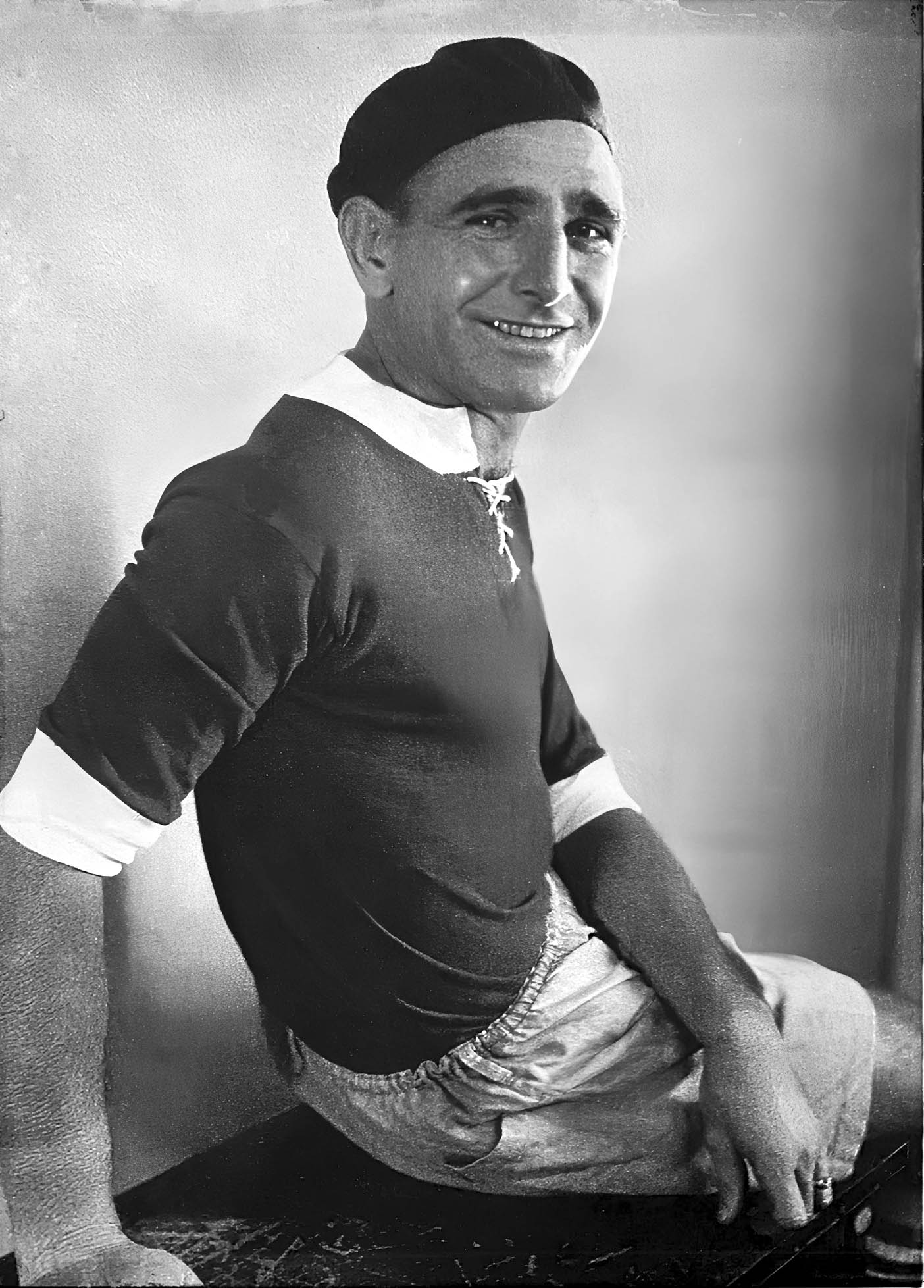

Personal information
- Full name: Fermín Díaz de Lecea López de Echazarreta
- Date of birth: September 25, 1905
- Place of birth: Zalduondo, Basque Country, Spain
- Date of death: August 24, 1989 (aged 83)
- Place of death: Mar del Plata, Argentina
- Position: Centre-back

Youth career
- Calzada de Rosario

Senior career*
| Years | Team | Apps | (Gls) |
| 1926–1927 | Calzada de Rosario | | |
| 1928–1931 | Newell's Old Boys | | |
| 1932–1940 | Independiente | | |
| 1941 | Tigre | | |
| 1943–1945 | Santiago Wanderers | | |
| 1946 | Unión Española | | |

Managerial career
- 1943–1945: Santiago Wanderers
- * Club domestic league appearances and goals

Fermín Díaz de Lecea López de Echazarreta (1905–1989), known as Fermín Lecea, was a Spanish-Argentine footballer, who played as defender in Club Atlético Independiente. He won the first championship of Independiente in the professional era.

== Career ==
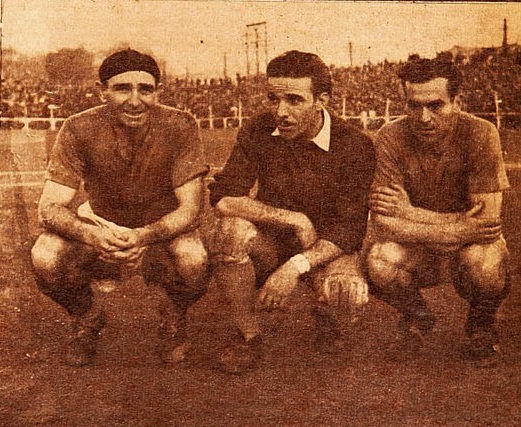
Fltr: Lecea, Leoncio Sabino, and Juan García in Santiago Wanderers in 1944

Fermín Lecea was born in Spain, and settled in Argentina at a young age. He began his career in Newell's Old Boys. One of his most memorable matches in the Newell's team, was in the Victory 2–0 against Torino F.C., match played on August 15, 1929, in Rosario, Argentina.

Lecea debuted in Argentine club Independiente in 1932, playing the final against River Plate this year. He won the championships of 1938 and 1939 and was captain of the same team.

Fermín Lecea finished his career playing for Club Atlético Tigre. Since 1948 to 1954 (except 1951) he served as coach of Rosario Central.

== Titles ==
Newell's Old Boys

- Liga Rosarina de Football: 1929

Independiente

- Primera División: 1938, 1939
- Copa Aldao: 1938, 1939
- Copa Ibarguren: 1938, 1939
- Copa Adrián C. Escobar: 1939
