= 1939 Copa Ibarguren =

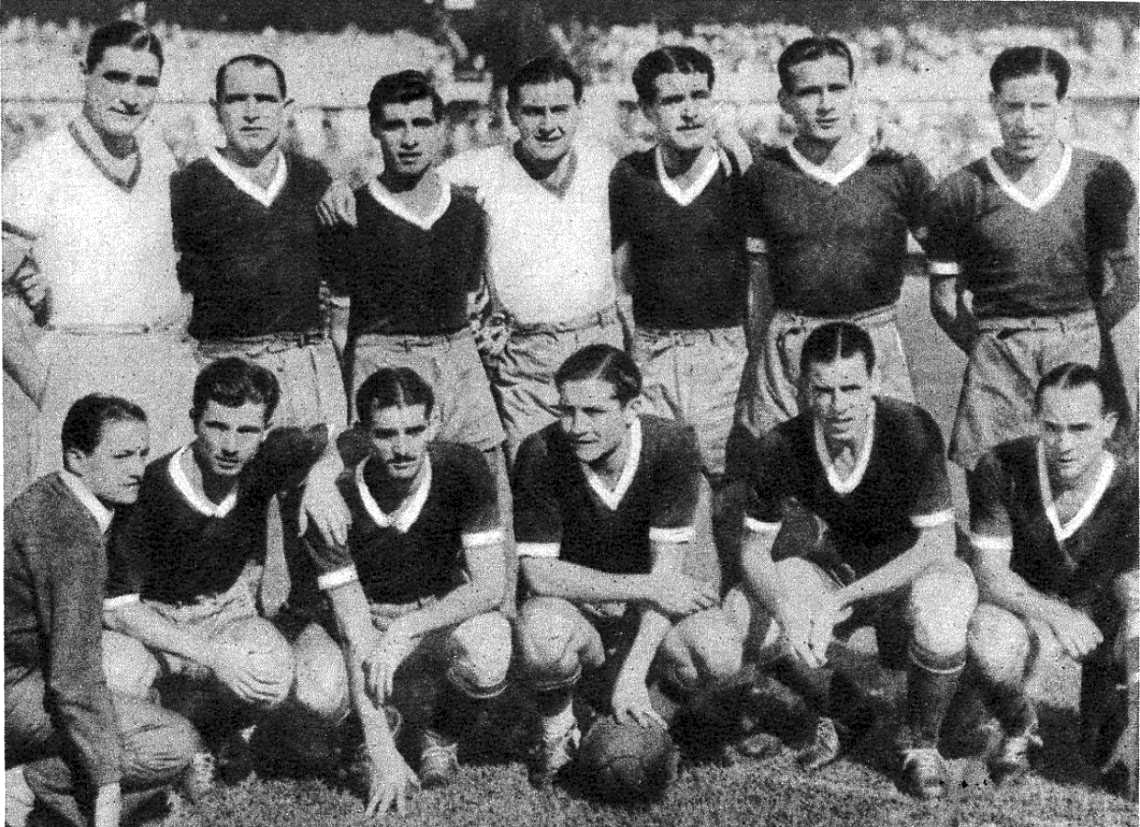
- An Independiente team of 1940
- Event: Copa Ibarguren
Independiente	Central Córdoba (R)
5	0
- Date: 31 March 1940
- Venue: San Lorenzo Stadium, Buenos Aires
- Referee: José Macías

The 1939 Copa Ibarguren was the 16th edition of the national cup of Argentina. The cup was contested by the champions of both competitions, the Primera División and the Torneo del Litoral.

Independiente (Primera División champion) faced Central Córdoba de Rosario (champion of "Torneo del Litoral") (Note: This competition, organised by Asociación Rosarina de Fútbol, was contested by clubs from Rosario, Santa Fe, and Paraná. Two notable absences were Rosario Central and Newell's Old Boys, which had incorporated to AFA's Primera División that same year, leaving regional competitions behind.) at San Lorenzo de Almagro's venue, Estadio Gasómetro, in the Boedo neighborhood of Buenos Aires, on March 31, 1940. Independiente easily defeated Central Córdoba 5–0, thereby winning their second consecutive Copa Ibarguren trophy.

== Qualified teams ==
Team	Qualification	Previous app.
Independiente	1939 Primera División champion	**1938**
Central Córdoba (R)	1939 Torneo del Litoral champion	(None)

- **Bold** indicates winning years

== Match details ==
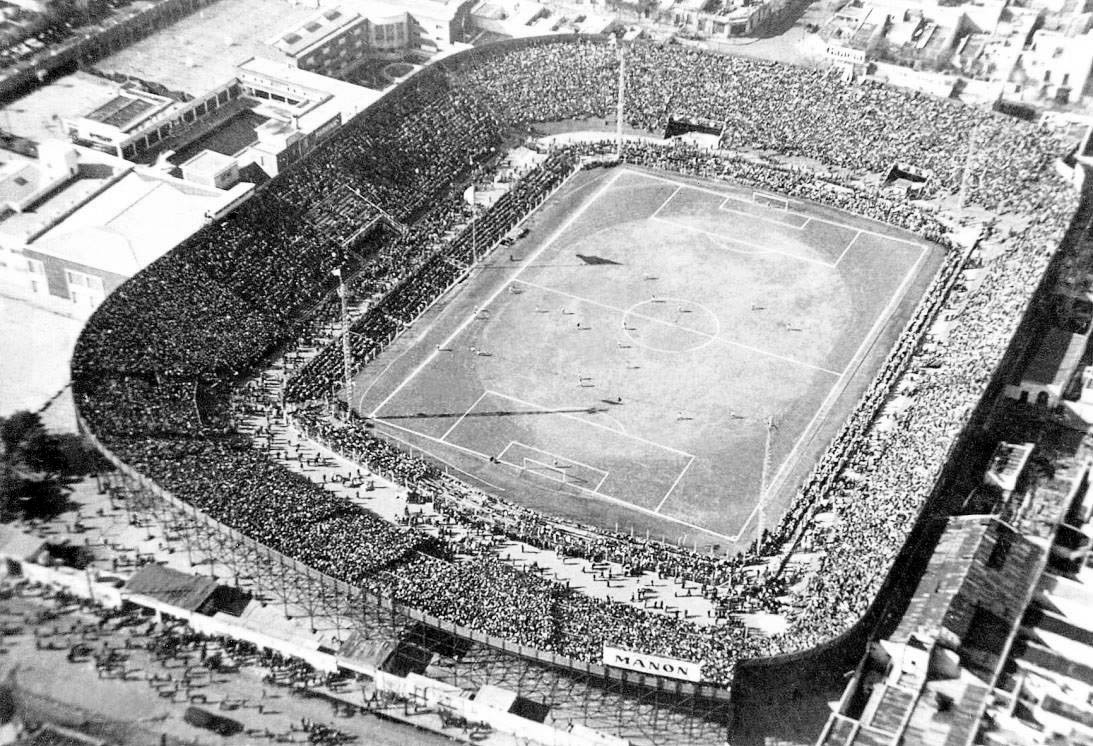
San Lorenzo Stadium, venue

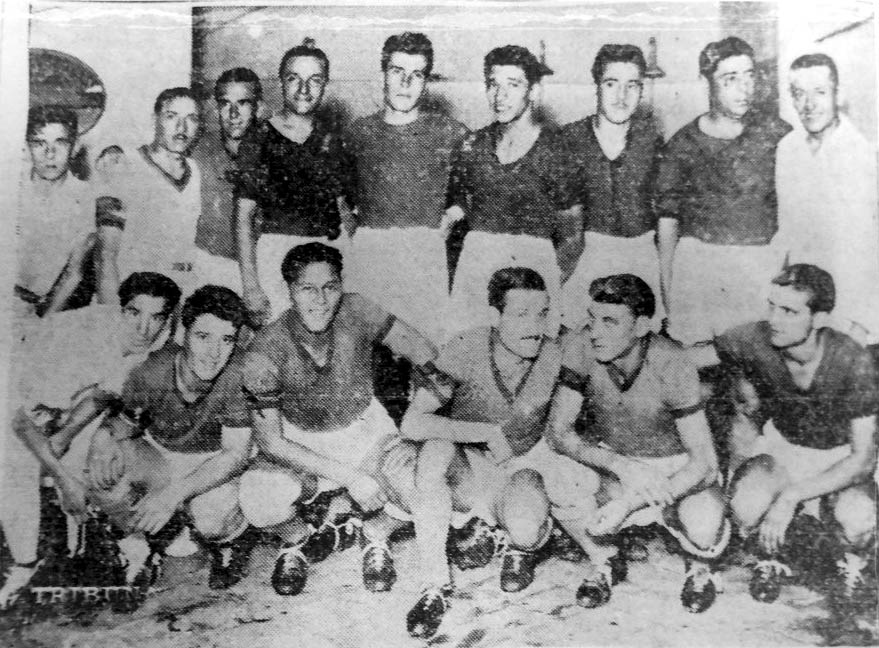
Central Córdoba team

1939 Copa Ibarguren
31 March 1940

Independiente	5–0	Central Córdoba (R)
Sastre 9' de la Mata 51'; Leguizamón 66'; Erico 72', 86'	Report

San Lorenzo Stadium, Buenos Aires
Referee: José Macías

**Independiente**	**Central Córdoba**

GK	(Argentina) Fernando Bello
DF	(Spain) Fermín Lecea
DF	(Argentina) Sabino Coletta
MF	(Argentina) Luis Franzolini
MF	(Argentina) Raúl Leguizamón
MF	(Argentina) Celestino Martínez
FW	(Argentina) Juan José Maril
FW	(Argentina) Vicente de la Mata
FW	(Argentina) Arsenio Erico
FW	(Argentina) Antonio Sastre
FW	(Argentina) Juan José Zorrilla
Manager:
(Argentina) Guillermo Ronzoni

GK	(Argentina) Rogelio Molina
DF	(Argentina) Andrés Garramendy
DF	(Argentina) Emilio Papetti
MF	(Argentina) Víctor Curuchet
MF	(Argentina) Feliciano Villalba
MF	(Argentina) José Casalini
FW	(Argentina) Francisco de la Mata
FW	(Argentina) Humberto Fiori
FW	(Argentina) Federico Monestés
FW	(Argentina) Waldino Aguirre
FW	(Argentina) José López
Manager:
(Argentina) ?
