= 1939 Copa Aldao =

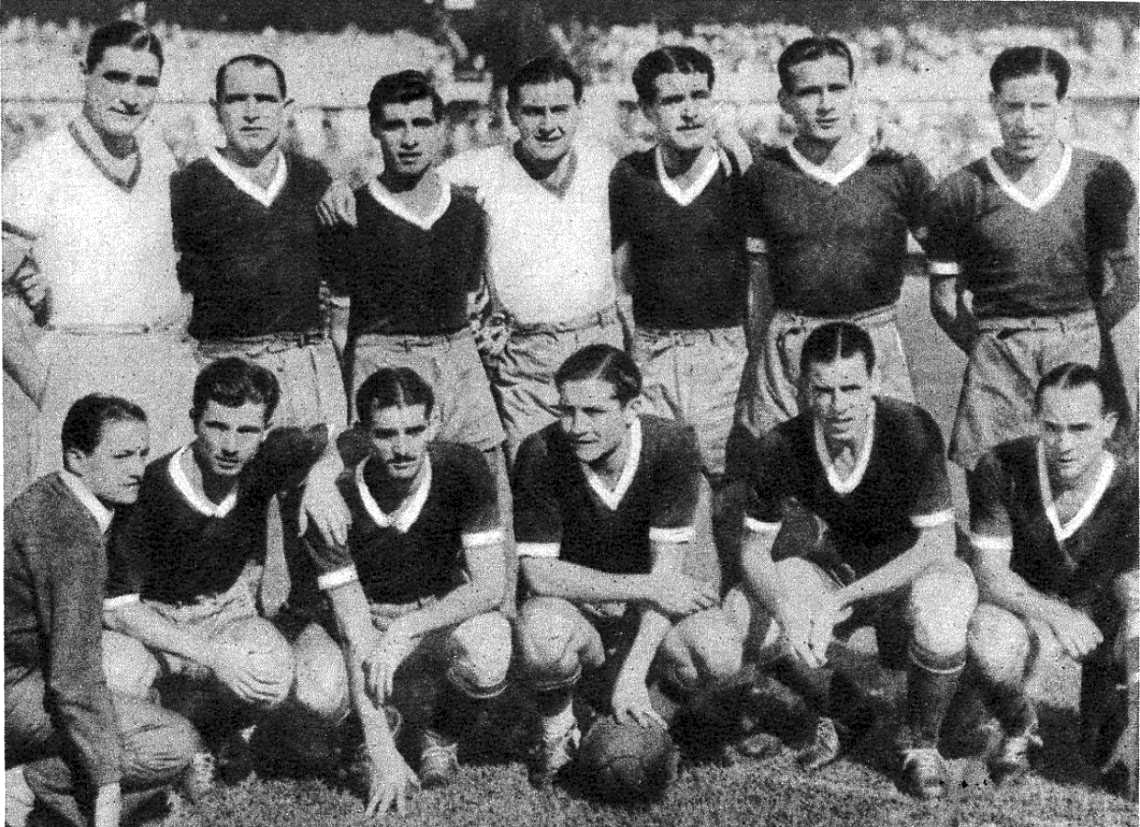
- An Independiente team of 1940
- Event: Copa Aldao
Independiente	Nacional
(Argentina)	(Uruguay)
5	0
- Date: Jul 9, 1940
- Venue: San Lorenzo, Buenos Aires
- Referee: Domingo Solari (Argentina)

The 1939 Copa Aldao was the final match to decide the winner of the Copa Aldao, the 12th edition of the international competition organised by the Argentine and Uruguayan Associations together. The final was contested by Uruguayan club Nacional and Argentine club Independiente.

The match was played at San Lorenzo Stadium in Buenos Aires, where Independiente achieved a conclusive 5–0 victory over Nacional, winning its second consecutive Copa Aldao Trophy.

== Qualified teams ==
Team	Qualification	Previous final app.
(Argentina) Independiente	1939 Primera División champions	**1938**
(Uruguay) Nacional	1939 Primera División champions	**1916**, 1917, **1919, 1920**

- **Bold** indicates winning years

== Venue ==
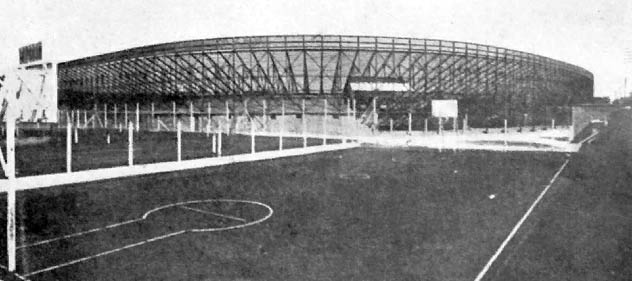
San Lorenzo Stadium, venue of the final

== Match details ==
1939 Copa Aldao
Jul 9, 1940

Independiente (Argentina)	5–0	(Uruguay) Nacional
Erico 9', 58', 74'; Zorrilla 75'; De la Mata 82'	Report

San Lorenzo de Almagro, Buenos Aires
Referee: Domingo Solari (Argentina)

**Independiente**	**Nacional**

GK	(Argentina) Fernando Bello
DF	(Uruguay) Manuel Sanguinetti
DF	(Argentina) Sabino Colettta
MF	(Argentina) Luis Franzolini
MF	(Argentina) Raúl Leguizamón
MF	(Argentina) Celestino Martinez
FW	(Argentina) Juan J. Maril
FW	(Argentina) Vicente De la Mata
FW	(Paraguay) Arsenio Erico
FW	(Argentina) Antonio Sastre
FW	(Argentina) Juan J. Zorrilla
Manager:
(Argentina) Guillermo Ronzoni

GK	(Uruguay) Aníbal Paz
DF	(Uruguay) Dándalo Candales
DF	(Uruguay) Juan Cabrera
MF	(Uruguay) Luis Luz
MF	(Uruguay) Rodolfo Pini
MF	(Uruguay) Schubert Gambetta
FW	(Uruguay) Luis Volpi
FW	(Uruguay) Aníbal Ciocca
FW	(Argentina) Atilio García
FW	(Uruguay) Francisco Arispe
FW	(Uruguay) Rorberto Porta
Manager:
(Uruguay) Héctor Castro
