= 1938 Copa Aldao =

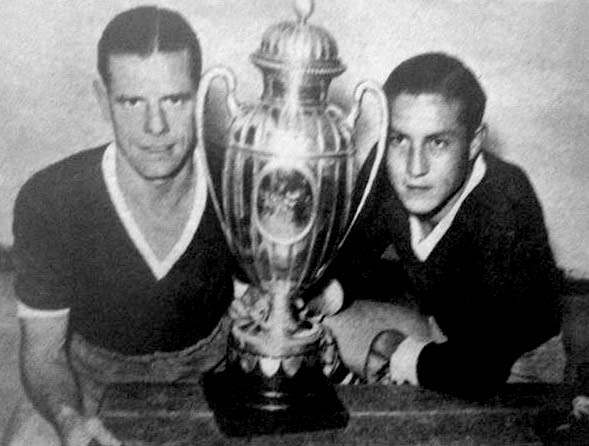
- Antonio Sastre (left) and Arsenio Erico with the trophy
- Event: Copa Aldao
Peñarol	Independiente
(Uruguay)	(Argentina)
1	3
- Date: 29 December 1938
- Venue: Estadio Centenario, Montevideo
- Referee: Aníbal Tejada (Uruguay)
- Attendance: 35,000

The 1938 Copa Aldao was the final match to decide the winner of the Copa Aldao, the 11th edition of the international competition organised by the Argentine and Uruguayan Associations together. The final was contested by Uruguayan club Peñarol (which played its third consecutive final) and Argentine club Independiente.

The match was played at Estadio Centenario in Montevideo, where Independiente beat Peñarol 3–1, winning its first Copa Aldao Trophy.

== Qualified teams ==
Team	Qualification	Previous final app.
(Uruguay) Peñarol	1938 Primera División champions	4 (1918, **1928**, 1936, 1937)
(Argentina) Independiente	1938 Primera División champions	(none)

- **Bold** indicates winning years

== Venue ==
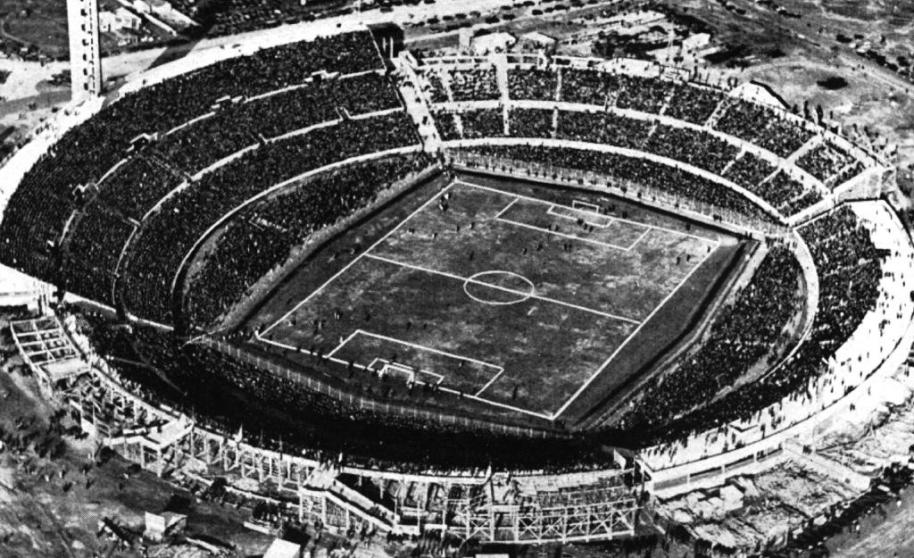
Estadio Centenario, venue

== Match details ==
1937 Copa Aldao
Dec 29, 1938

Peñarol (Uruguay)	1–3	(Argentina) Independiente
Lago 24'	Report	De la Mata 29'; Zorrilla 38'; Erico 85'

Estadio Centenario, Montevideo
Attendance: 35,000ref name=histind/>
Referee: Aníbal Tejada (Uruguay)

**Peñarol**	**Independiente**

GK	(Uruguay) Julio Barrios
DF	(Uruguay) Jorge Clulow
DF	(Uruguay) Ernesto Mascheroni
MF	(Uruguay) Roberto Scarone
MF	(Uruguay) Álvaro Gestido
MF	(Uruguay) Raúl Rodríguez
FW	(Uruguay) Aníbal Traverso
FW	(Uruguay) Ubaldo Cruche
FW	(Uruguay) Pedro Lago
FW	(Uruguay) Severino Varela
FW	(Uruguay) Adelaido Camaití
Manager:
(Uruguay) Athuel Velásquez

GK	(Argentina) Fernando Bello
DF	(Argentina) Fermín Lecea
DF	(Argentina) Juan M. Baigorria
MF	(Argentina) Luis Franzolini
MF	(Argentina) Raúl Leguizamón
MF	(Argentina) Celestino Martinez
FW	(Argentina) José Vilariño
FW	(Argentina) Vicente De la Mata
FW	(Paraguay) Arsenio Erico
FW	(Argentina) Antonio Sastre
FW	(Argentina) Juan J. Zorrilla
Manager:
(Argentina) Guillermo Ronzoni
