= Hungary national under-19 football team =

National association football team

Hungary Under-19
- Nickname: The Magyars
- Association: Hungarian Football Federation
- Confederation: UEFA (Europe)
- Head coach: Marcus Jahn
- Captain: Balázs Bese
First colours	Second colours

UEFA European Under-19 Championship
- Appearances: 33 (first in 1953)
- Best result: Winner (1953, 1960, 1984)

FIFA U-20 World Cup
- Appearances: 3 (first in 1977)
- Best result: Third-place (2009)

This article includes current squads of Hungary U-20 and U-19 national football teams.

== The road to 2008 UEFA Euro U-19 ==
After 11 years, the Hungarian U-19 football team qualified for the 2008 EURO U-19 final tournament. At the first round of qualifiers the team finished the top of the group, with 3 victories, against Kazakhstan (6-0), Wales (3-1), and Switzerland (2-1). After that, second round was much harder, but as a host of the Group 2 matches, the team played at home, in Hungary, and the atmosphere helped in times of need. The first match against Lithuania, was a 2-2 draw, but in the last 2 matches, the team could win, against Cyprus 2-1, and Portugal 1-0 and that was enough to qualify.

== Results and fixtures ==
Win Draw Loss

=== 2022 UEFA European Under-19 Championship ===
==== Qualifiers ====
===== Elite Round – Group 1 =====
Pos	Team	Pld	W	D	L	GF	GA	GD	Pts	Qualification
1	Israel	3	2	1	0	4	1	+3	7	Final tournament
2	Hungary (H)	3	1	1	1	4	2	+2	4	
3	Scotland	3	1	0	2	2	5	−3	3	
4	Turkey	3	1	0	2	4	6	−2	3	

Updated to match(es) played on 26 March 2022. Source: UEFA
Rules for classification: Qualification tiebreakers
(H) Hosts

23 March 2022 2022 UEFA European Under-19 Championship qualification#Elite round	Israel	0–0	Hungary	ETO Park, Győr, Hungary
19:30		Report		Referee: Philip Farrugia (Malta)

== Players ==
=== Current squad ===
The following players were called up for the 2026 UEFA European Under-19 Championship qualification matches against Italy, Turkey and Slovakia.

Caps and goals correct as of 31 March 2025, after the match against Slovakia.

No.	Pos.	Player	Date of birth (age)	Caps	Goals	Club
1	GK	Mirkó Bozó	16 June 2007 (age 19)	10	0	(Hungarian Football Federation) Puskás Akadémia
12	GK	Ákos Tompa	10 March 2007 (age 19)	0	0	(Royal Spanish Football Federation) Real Sociedad
	GK	Botond Kocsis	10 July 2007 (age 19)	1	0	(Hungarian Football Federation) Kazincbarcikai
3	DF	Botond Bolgár	30 August 2007 (age 19)	7	0	(Hungarian Football Federation) Kecskemét
4	DF	Barna Pál	11 February 2007 (age 19)	9	1	(Hungarian Football Federation) Puskás Akadémia
14	DF	Árpád Mona	2 March 2007 (age 19)	5	0	(Hungarian Football Federation) Debrecen
15	DF	Viktor Vitályos	18 July 2007 (age 19)	11	0	(Hungarian Football Federation) MTK Budapest
18	DF	Bence Szakos	22 February 2007 (age 19)	5	0	(Hungarian Football Federation) Diósgyőr
19	DF	Zalán Kugyela	20 July 2007 (age 19)	9	0	(Italian Football Federation) Torino
23	DF	Gergő Tercza	9 January 2007 (age 19)	4	0	(Hungarian Football Federation) Debrecen
5	MF	Ádám Somogyi	23 November 2007 (age 18)	12	1	(Hungarian Football Federation) Fehérvár
6	MF	Zsombor Hős	13 August 2007 (age 19)	8	0	(Hungarian Football Federation) Vasas
8	MF	Ádám Madarász	16 February 2007 (age 19)	10	0	(Hungarian Football Federation) Ferencváros
10	MF	Hunor Németh	16 March 2007 (age 19)	13	4	(Hungarian Football Federation) MTK Budapest
21	MF	Ádám Décsy	22 April 2007 (age 19)	9	0	(Hungarian Football Federation) Győri ETO
	MF	Dávid Patai	13 March 2007 (age 19)	0	0	(Hungarian Football Federation) Debrecen
7	FW	Kevin Mondovics	14 March 2007 (age 19)	14	4	(Hungarian Football Federation) Puskás Akadémia
9	FW	Bendegúz Kovács	31 March 2007 (age 19)	10	4	(Royal Dutch Football Association) AZ Alkmaar
11	FW	Imre Egri	18 August 2007 (age 19)	9	0	(Hungarian Football Federation) Debrecen
13	FW	Simón Bodnar	22 August 2007 (age 19)	6	2	(Argentine Football Association) Independiente
16	FW	Márton Szép	26 July 2007 (age 19)	8	2	(Hungarian Football Federation) Győri ETO
17	FW	Giorgio Ghiani	23 April 2007 (age 19)	2	0	(Royal Dutch Football Association) NEC Nijmegen
	FW	Leon Myrtaj	28 March 2008 (age 18)	0	0	(The Football Association) Tottenham Hotspur

=== Recent call-ups ===
Pos.	Player	Date of birth (age)	Caps	Goals	Club	Latest call-up

== See also ==
- Hungary national football team
- Hungary national under-21 football team
- Hungary national under-17 football team
