= Fernando Bello (footballer) =

Argentine footballer (1910–1973)

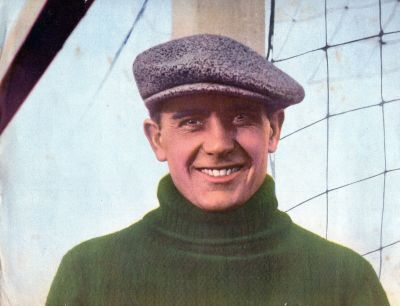
- Bello in 1938

Personal information
- Date of birth: 29 November 1910
- Date of death: 30 November 1973 (aged 63)
- Position: Goalkeeper

International career
Years	Team	Apps	(Gls)
1935–1945	Argentina	9	(0)

Fernando Bello (29 November 1910 – 30 November 1973) was an Argentine footballer. He played in nine matches for the Argentina national football team from 1935 to 1945. He was also part of Argentina's squad for the 1945 South American Championship.

== Honours ==
=== As a Player ===
Independiente

- Primera División: 1938, 1939
- Copa Ibarguren: 1939
- Copa Adrián Escobar: 1939
- Copa Aldao: 1938, 1939

Argentina

- Copa América: 1937, 1945

=== As a Manager ===
Independiente

- Argentine Primera División: 1948
