= Simón Bodnar =

Hungarian footballer (born 2007)

Personal information
- Date of birth: 22 August 2007 (age 19)
- Place of birth: Buenos Aires Province, Argentina
- Height: 1.85 m (6 ft 1 in)
- Positions: Winger; forward

Team information
- Current team: Independiente
- Number: 51

Youth career
- Independiente

Senior career*
| Years | Team | Apps | (Gls) |
| 2026– | Independiente | 0 | (0) |

International career^{‡}
| 2025– | Hungary U19 | 6 | (2) |
- * Club domestic league appearances and goals ‡ National team caps and goals as of 31 March 2026

Simón Bodnar (born 22 August 2007) is a professional footballer who plays as a winger or forward for Independiente. Born in Argentina, he is a Hungary youth international.

== Early life ==
Bodnar was born on 22 August 2007 and is of Hungarian descent through his father. Born in Buenos Aires Province, Argentina, he is a native of Ciudad Madero, Argentina and has been nicknamed "Simi".

== Club career ==
As a youth player, Bodnar joined the youth academy of Argentine side Independiente at the age of seven and was promoted to the club's senior team in 2026.

== International career ==
Bodnar is a Hungary youth international and has represented the country internationally at under-19 level and is eligible to represent Argentina internationally, having been born in the country.

During the autumn of 2025 and the spring of 2026, he played for the Hungary national under-19 football team for 2026 UEFA European Under-19 Championship qualification.

== Style of play ==
Bodnar plays as a winger or forward and is left-footed. Argentine news website Infobae wrote in 2026 that "his versatility allows him to play on either wing, taking advantage of his ability to cut inside onto either side, combined with his 1.85 meters of height and physical strength".
