= Luis Ravaschino =

Argentine footballer

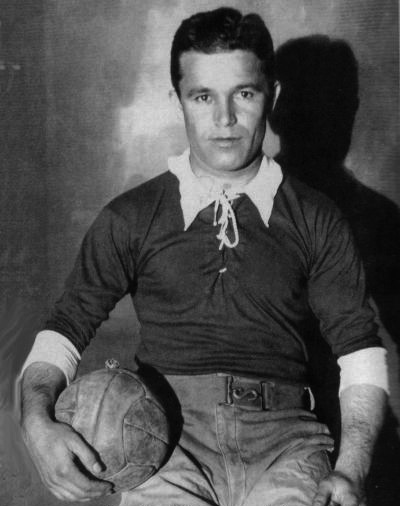
- Ravaschino in 1929 during his years in Independiente.

Personal information
- Full name: Luis Alfonso Ravaschino
- Date of birth: 15 January 1903
- Place of birth: Barracas, Buenos Aires, Argentina
- Date of death: 30 March 1988 (aged 85)
- Position: Forward

Senior career*
Years	Team	Apps	(Gls)
1918–22	Sportivo Barracas	?	(?)
1923–34	Independiente	285	(136)
1935	Lanús	13	(1)

International career
1924	Argentina	2	(0)
- * Club domestic league appearances and goals

Luis Alfonso Ravaschino (15 January 1903 - 30 March 1988) was an Argentine footballer, who played as forward, most of his career for the Club Atlético Independiente, becoming one of the club's historic topscorers and one of the most notable players during the 1920s and 1930s.

With Independiente, Ravaschino won 4 titles: Primera División 1926 Aam and 3 consecutive Copa Competencia in 1924, 1925 and 1926.

Ravaschino is also placed 4th as club's all-time topscorer with 136 goals scored. He was the leading topscorer at the 1924 Aam championship with 15 goals (sharing the top position with Ricardo Lucarelli of Sportivo Barracas).

== Career ==
Ravaschino started his career playing at the fifth division of Sportivo Barracas (located on his place of birth) in 1918. In 1923 he debuted in Independiente, where he would play 12 consecutive years scoring 136 goals for the club.

He was one of the most notable players that formed the 1926 team, forming a powerful attacking line along with Canaveri, Lalín, Seoane and Orsi. Independiente won the title finishing unbeaten that season.

Ravaschino also played for the Argentina national team in 1924 although he only played 2 matches (both against Uruguay) with no goals scored.

When football became professional in Argentina in 1931, Ravaschino scored the first goal of Independiente in the professional era during a match against Argentinos Juniors, on 4 June that same year. In 1934 he left the club after 12 years, signing for the Club Atlético Lanús where he played one season before his retirement as a footballer. His last goal scored was on 1 September 1935, against Chacarita Juniors.

After his short tenure in Lanús, Ravaschino became manager, coaching Los Andes, Talleres (BA), Banfield (where he won the title in 1946 promoting to Primera), Independiente and Lanús. He also worked as broadcaster for the radio show "Ases del Deporte" ("Aces of Sports"), sharing the microphone with other former footballers such as Juan Carlos Muñoz, Roberto Cherro and Natalio Perinetti.

== Titles ==
=== Independiente ===
- Primera División (1): 1926 Aam
- Copa Competencia (3): 1924, 1925, 1926

=== Individual honors ===
- Primera División topscorer (1): 1924 Aam
