= Vicente de la Mata (footballer, born 1918) =

Argentine footballer (1918–1980)

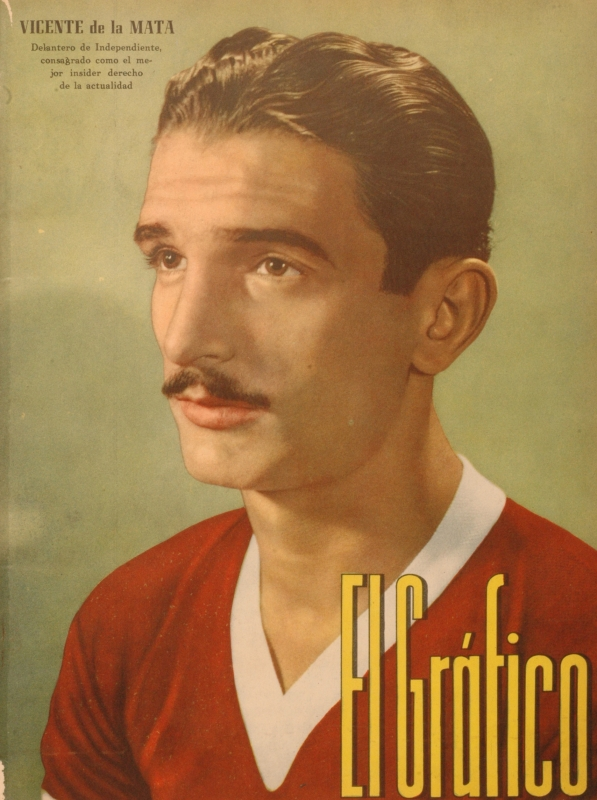
- De la Mata in 1940

Personal information
- Date of birth: 15 January 1918
- Place of birth: Rosario, Argentina
- Date of death: 4 August 1980 (aged 62)
- Place of death: Rosario, Argentina
- Height: 1.72 m (5 ft 8 in)
- Position: Forward

Youth career
- 1930–1936: Central Córdoba (R)

Senior career*
Years	Team	Apps	(Gls)
1936	Central Córdoba (R)		
1937–1950	Independiente	362	(151)
1951–1952	Newell's Old Boys	23	(1)

International career
1937–1946	Argentina	13	(6)

Managerial career
- Independiente
- Deportivo Morón
- Dock Sud
- Central Córdoba (R)
- * Club domestic league appearances and goals

Vicente de la Mata (15 January 1918 – 4 August 1980) was an Argentine football player and manager. A forward, he played most of his club career for Independiente and for the Argentina national team between 1937 and 1946.

== Playing career ==
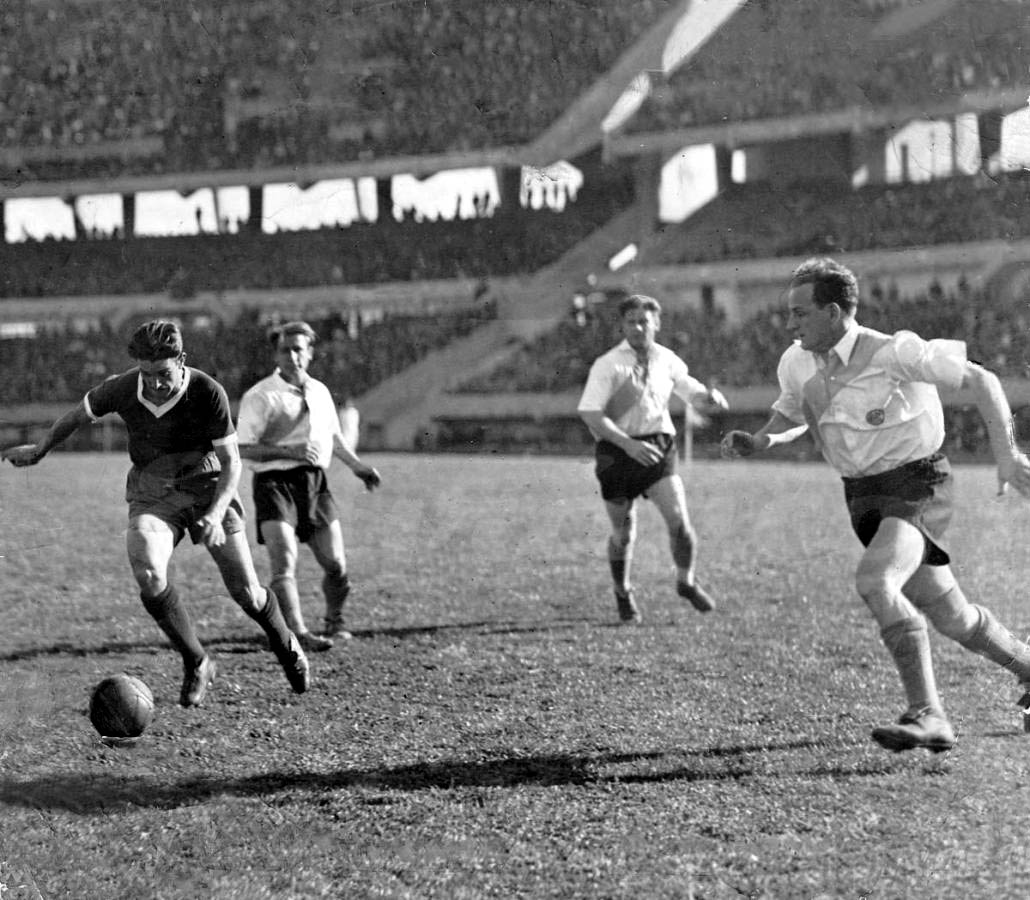
De la Mata playing against River Plate in 1939.

De la Mata emerged from the youth team of Central Córdoba in 1936, he was soon signed by Independiente where he spent 14 seasons, scoring 151 goals in 362 games for the club. He was part of three championship winning teams and played alongside Antonio Sastre and Arsenio Erico. He is fondly remembered as one of the club's greatest ever players.

De la Mata played for Argentina on thirteen occasions between 1937 and 1946, scoring six goals. He played for Argentina in the Copa América on three occasions, each won by Argentina. In 1937 he scored both goals in the 2–0 win over Brazil in the final. He was also part of the squads that won the tournament in 1945 and 1946.

In 1951 he returned to Rosario to play for Newell's Old Boys and retired in 1952.

== Managerial career ==
De La Mata went on to become a football manager, he had spells in charge of Independiente, Deportivo Morón, Dock Sud and Central Córdoba.

== Honours ==
Independiente

- Argentine Primera División: 1938, 1939, 1948
- Copa Ibarguren: 1938, 1939
- Copa Adrián Escobar: 1939
- Copa Aldao: 1938, 1939

Argentina

- Copa América: 1937, 1945, 1946

Individual

- Copa America Best Player: 1937
