= Antonio Sastre =

Argentine footballer

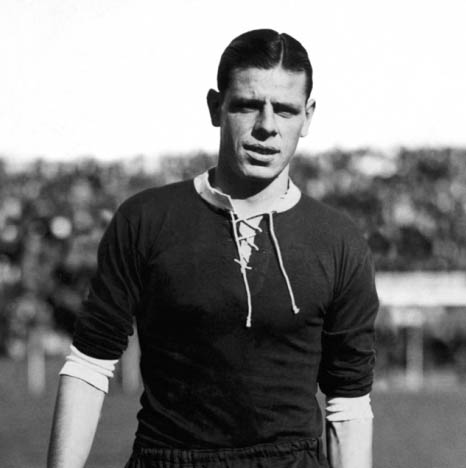
- Sastre while playing for Independiente

Personal information
- Date of birth: 27 April 1911
- Place of birth: Lomas de Zamora, Argentina
- Date of death: 23 November 1987 (aged 76)
- Position: Midfielder

Youth career
- ?–1931: Progresista

Senior career*
Years	Team	Apps	(Gls)
1931–1942	Independiente		
1942–1946	São Paulo		
1947	Gimnasia (LP)		

International career
1933–1941	Argentina	34	(6)
- * Club domestic league appearances and goals

Antonio Sastre (27 April 1911 – 23 November 1987) was an Argentine footballer who played most of his career for Club Atlético Independiente and São Paulo of Brazil. He is one of the 24 players inducted into the Argentine Football Association Hall of Fame. Sastre was an all-round midfielder who could play well almost anywhere on the pitch due to his intelligence and versatility.

Sastre is also known as one of the first true playmakers of the pre-war era as well as one of the best. Sastre won 11 titles at club level, and 2 international championships with the Argentina national team.

== Club career ==
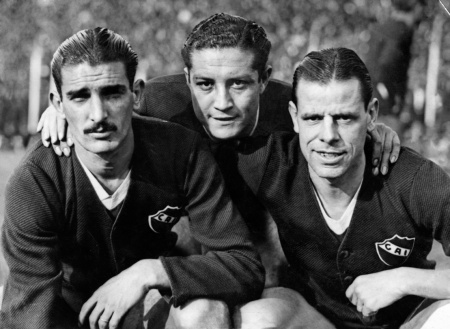
Sastre (right) with Vicente de la Mata (left) and Arsenio Erico during their tenure at Independiente, c. 1938–39.

Sastre began his football career at Progresista, being traded to Independiente in 1931. With the coming of forwards Vicente de la Mata and Arsenio Erico, Independiente built a powerful formation that would win the 1938, 1939 league titles plus domestic cups Ibarguren, A. Escobar and international Copa Aldao twice.

During his 12 seasons with the club he played 340 games, scoring 112 goals. In 1942 Sastre joined Brazilian side São Paulo which last title had been won in 1931. Playing for São Paulo, Sastre won three Paulista championships in 1943, 1945 and 1946.

"When I arrived in Sao Paulo, my adaptation was not easy. The media said that the club had acquired a bondi, as they referred to old trams, rusted iron. We lost the first two matches, causing the coach resigned. When Lloreca was hired as coach and I was not used to train every day, I talk to him and reached an agreement which allowed me to go directly to the field on Sundays, before the lunch. In the first match we played with Lloreca coaching, we won by 9–1 and I scored six goals"

— Antonio Sastre remembering his years with Sao Paulo.

Sastre returned to Argentina in 1947 when he helped Gimnasia y Esgrima de La Plata win the Segunda División championship and gain promotion to the first division that same year.

== International career ==
Sastre played for the Argentina national team on 34 occasions, scoring 6 goals. He won Copa América with Argentina on two occasions, in 1937 and 1941.

== Honours ==
=== Club ===
Independiente

- Primera División (2): 1938, 1939
- Copa Ibarguren (2): 1938, 1939
- Copa Adrián Escobar (1): 1939
- Copa Aldao (2): 1938, 1939

São Paulo

- Campeonato Paulista (3): 1943, 1945, 1946

Gimnasia y Esgrima LP

- Primera B Metropolitana (1): 1947

=== International ===
Argentina

- Copa América (2): 1937, 1941
