= A la Ciudad de Londres =

Defunct department store in Buenos Aires, Argentina

Coordinates: 34.60860196736164°S 58.37495804414033°W

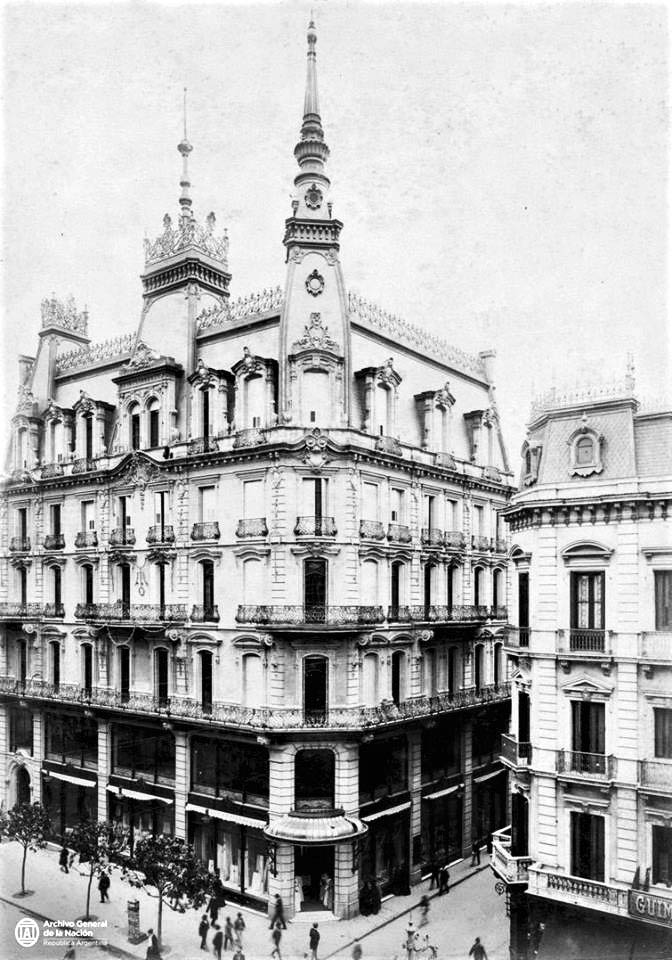
- A la Ciudad de Londres, branch of Calle Peru and Avenida de Mayo
- Industry: fashion
- Founder: Jean Brun; Hugh Brun
- Defunct: 1922
- Headquarters: Buenos Aires, Argentina
- Products: clothes shoes hats

A la Ciudad de Londres was a traditional European department store, which operated in Buenos Aires from 1872 to 1922. It was the first large clothing store established in the city of Buenos Aires towards the end of the 19th century.

== History ==
This fashion store was installed in Buenos Aires by 1870. Its owner was Jean Brun, of French origin, who opened the first branch in the neighborhood of Monserrat. It was inaugurated on March 15, 1873 at the intersections of Peru and Avenida de Mayo streets.

The employees of this store founded the Club Atlético Independiente in 1904.

The original store building was destroyed in a fire on August 19, 1910.

On October 10, 1910, after a fire that destroyed the original store, a second branch was opened located on the streets Pellegrini and Corrientes, in the neighborhood of San Nicolas.

A la Ciudad de Londres traded with the main European houses, including fashion products of England, Scotland and France. It was the main store in Buenos Aires towards end of the 19th century, and early 20th century.

== Gallery ==
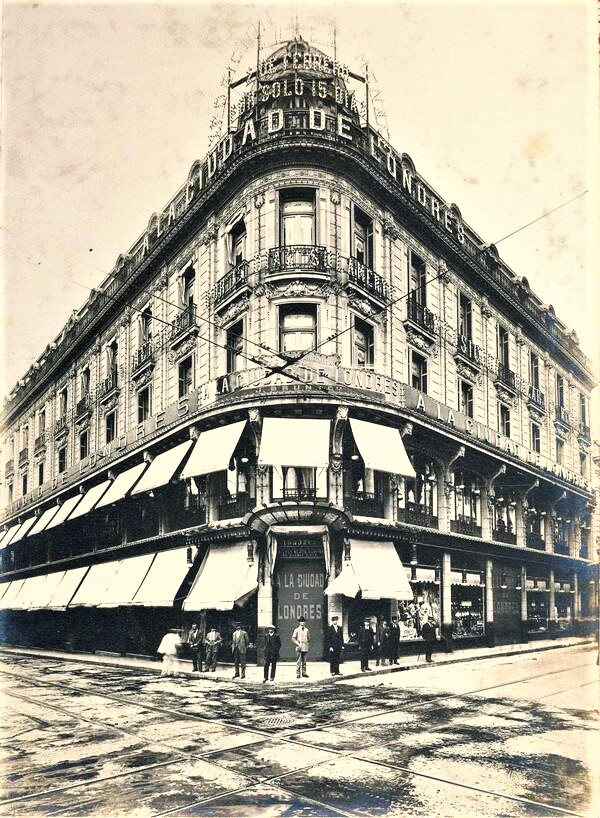
Branch of Carlos Pellegrini and Avenida Corrientes, c.1910.

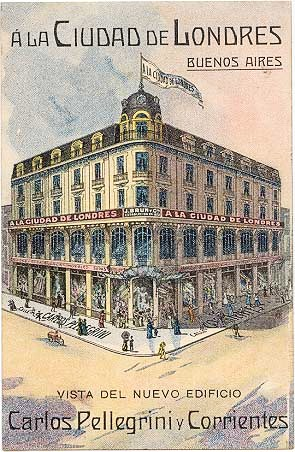
Branch advertising c.1890.

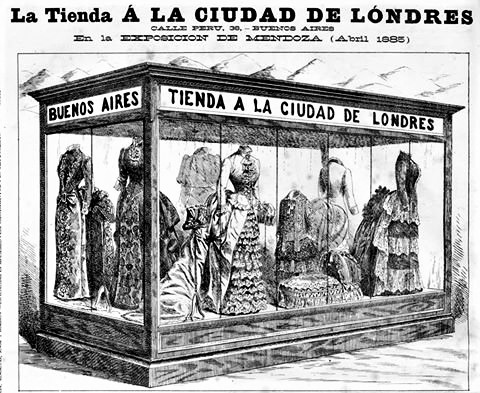
Advertising of the year 1885.

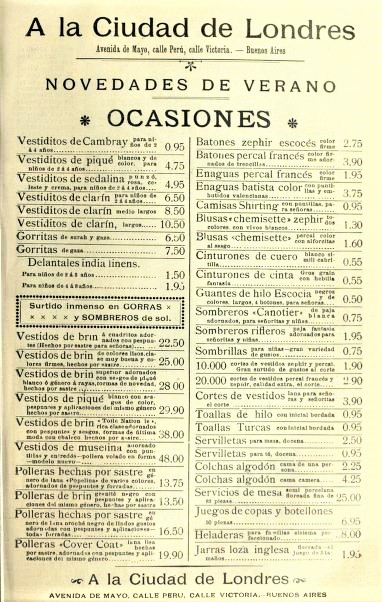
Catalog of products offered by the store in 1901.

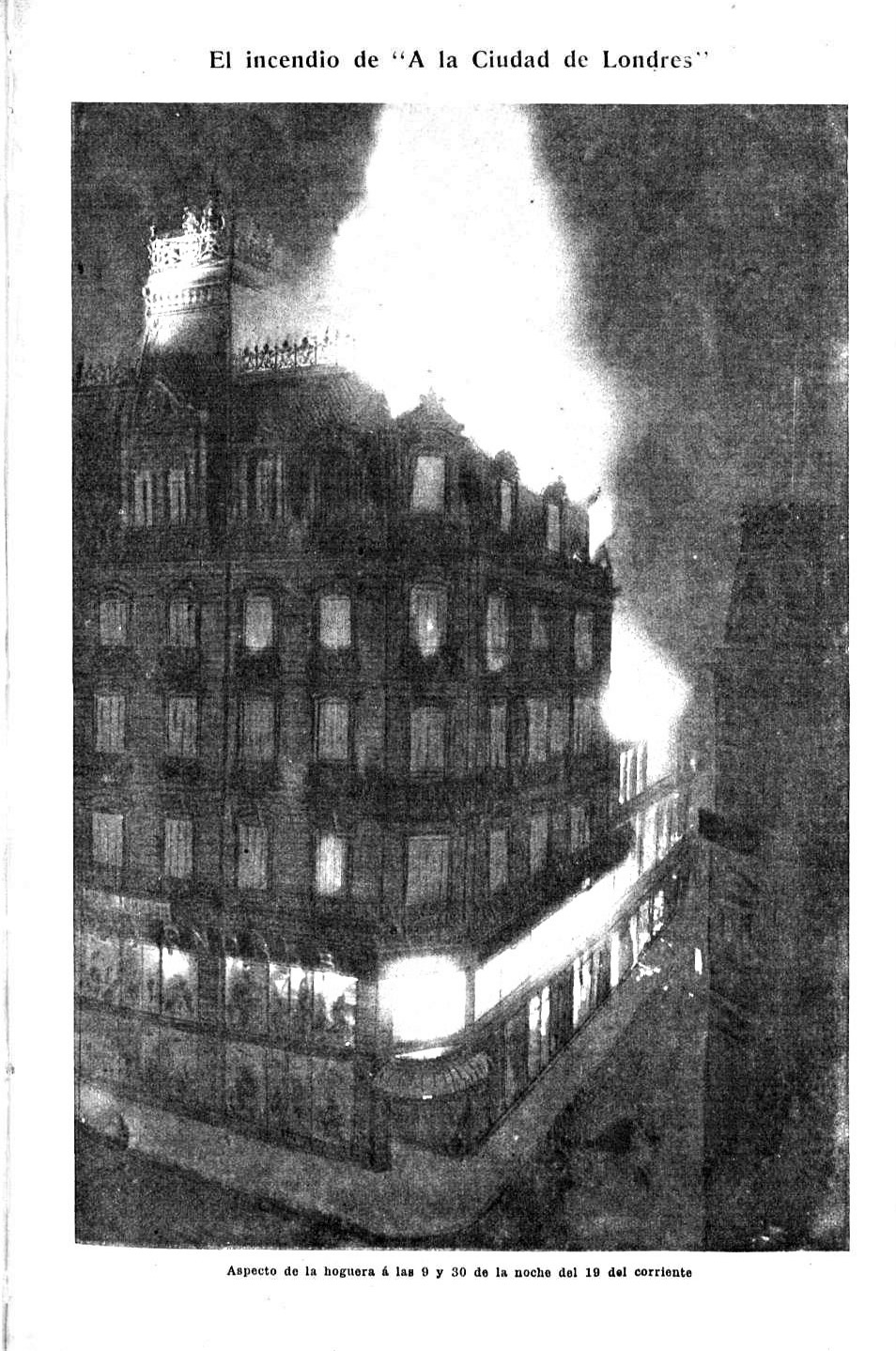
News about the store fire, Caras y Caretas.
