= Club Atlético Independiente =

Argentine professional sports club

Independiente
- Full name: Club Atlético Independiente
- Nicknames: El Rojo (The Red); Los Diablos Rojos (The Red Devils); El Rey de Copas (King of Cups); Orgullo Nacional (The National Pride)
- Founded: 1 January 1905; 121 years ago (Note: Although the meeting where a group of football enthusiasts decided to establish a club was held on 4 August 1904, the official date of establishment of the club was set on 1 January 1905, then signed and initialled on the act of foundation.)
- Ground: Estadio Libertadores de América – Ricardo Enrique Bochini
- Capacity: 43,187
- Owner: 160,000 members (socios)
- President: Néstor Grindetti
- Manager: Jadson Viera
- League: Primera División
- 2025: 11th of 30
- Website: clubaindependiente.com
| Home colours | Away colours |

Club Atlético Independiente (CAI) (Spanish pronunciation: [ˈkluβ aˈtletiko indepenˈdjente]) is an Argentine professional sports club, which has its headquarters and stadium in Avellaneda, a city of the Buenos Aires Province. The club is best known for its football team, which plays in the Primera División and is considered one of Argentina's Big Five football clubs.

Independiente was officially founded on 1 January 1905 as Independiente Foot-Ball Club, although the institution had been formed on 4 August 1904. Originally from Monserrat, a neighbourhood of Buenos Aires city, the club moved to Crucecita in 1907 and then to Avellaneda in 1928. The football team achieved promotion to the Argentine Primera División for the first time in 1911, and has participated there ever since, except for the 2013–14 season, when they were relegated.

Inaugurated in 2009, the Estadio Libertadores de América serves as homeground for the men's football team and, on special occasions, for the women's team. It has a capacity of 49,500. Their fanbase is the third largest in the country.

Over time Independiente has won 16 Primera División titles (14 of them in the professional era) and 9 first-tier and one second-tier National cups, being the fourth most decorated club on the national stage. They also have the most victories at the Avellaneda derby, the second most important derby in the country behind the Superclásico.

Despite the national success, Independiente is mainly recognized for its continental titles, having won a record seven Copa Libertadores (1964, 1965, 1972, 1973, 1974, 1975 and 1984, including a four-title-in-a-row record), two Intercontinental Cups (1973 v. Juventus in Rome and 1984 v. Liverpool in Tokyo), two Copa Sudamericana (2010 and 2017) and the 1995 Recopa Sudamericana.

They also achieved success in now-defunct competitions such as two Copa Aldao, a record three Copa Interamericana, two Supercopa Libertadores and the 2018 Suruga Bank Championship. Over time these achievements made Independiente win the nicknames of "Rey de Copas" (King of Cups) and "Orgullo Nacional" (National Pride), the latter after the team won, at the 1984 Intercontinental, the first encounter between an Argentine and British teams after the Falklands War. With 18 FIFA-recognized international titles, Independiente is the most successful club at this category in the Americas, alongside Boca Juniors, and third in the world.

Apart from football, other activities practised at the club are athletics, basketball, boxing, chess, field hockey, futsal, handball, gymnastics, martial arts, Pilates, roller skating, scuba diving, swimming, tennis, volleyball, water polo, and yoga. Also, the club has its own school, with Pre-Kindergarten, Kindergarten, Elementary, Secondary school levels and Tertiary education (with, for now, only two careers, being physical education teacher and football coach).

== History ==
=== Early years in Buenos Aires ===
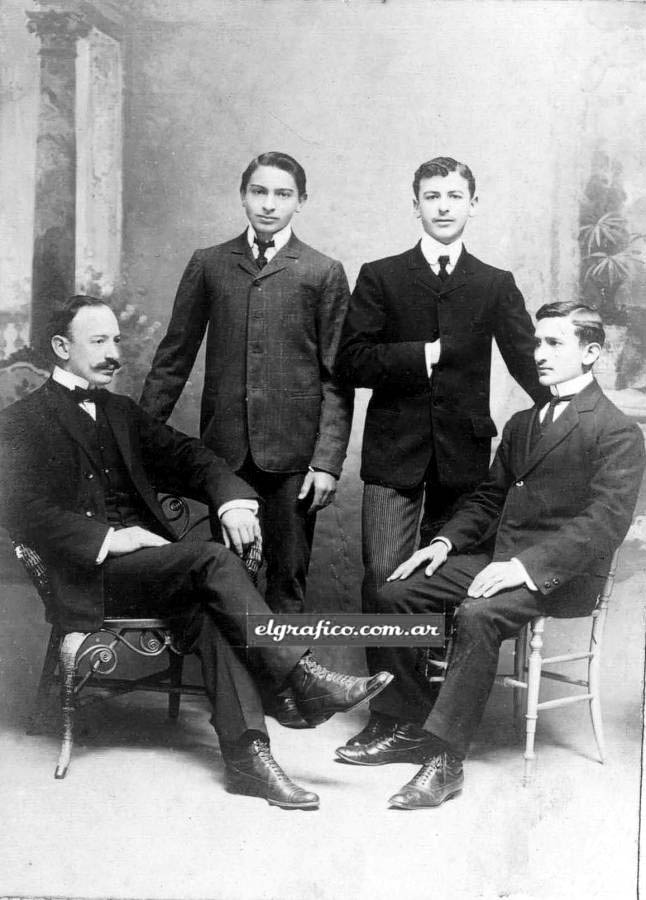
Degiorgi brothers, founders (1905 photograph)

Independiente was founded in 1904 by a group of employees from a luxury fashion store called "A la Ciudad de Londres" (To the City of London), located in the Montserrat neighborhood of Buenos Aires. These employees, the youngest and most affected by precarious work in the store, despite paying the club fee, were marginalized from the 1903-founded team Maipo-Banfield Football Club (made up of the store's most elite workers). They were only allowed to attend as spectators.

On 4 August of that year, they met in a bar on Perú Street (just two blocks from the Plaza de Mayo and the Casa Rosada), there they made the decision to reject an invitation to be part of Atlanta (also founded those days) and proclaimed the creation of the "Independiente Foot-Ball Club", symbolizing their independence ideals. Rosendo Degiorgi was the one who gave the club its name and was elected as its first president, opening the club's headquarters in his own house. The team's first shirts were white, reused from a Barracas team called Plate United, which ceased to exist in 1903. These shirts featured a blue emblem with white details, very similar to St. Andrew's Athletic Club's emblem. It is unknown whether this similarity was intentional or coincidental.

Fifteen days after the first meeting, on 19 August, they played the first game in their history, a 2–2 tie with Atlanta, on a field located in the Flores neighborhood of Buenos Aires.

During its short stay in the Argentine capital, Independiente wandered in various improvised fields in the neighborhoods of Flores and La Paternal. They also acted as hosts in Recoleta, where they rented a very expensive field belonging to the National School of Buenos Aires for five months.

The club competed in 1905 in zonal tournaments like the Villalobos Cup, where they faced for the first time Boca Juniors (created just four months before) on 27 August, being victorious 4–1 in Flores.

The club joined the AFA in 1906 and was registered to begin competing that year, like neighbors Atlanta, but was disqualified at the last moment for not complying with the strict stadium rules demanded by the then English-directed AFA. Therefore, they registered to compete in the Central Football League. At this championship they faced short-lived teams like Highland Forest, Gutemberg, Presidente Roca, Imperio, Mariano Moreno, General Arenales, La Prensa, Primero de Mayo and others. Among them, the only team that survived over that time is Platense.

=== Crucecita period ===
While the team competed at the Central League, a committee composed by club president Arístides Langone and secretaries Carlos Degiorgi, Antonio Díez, Severo Rodríguez and Juan Darnay was seeking to relocate the club at a new field where they could build a stadium. By recommendation from Juan Irigoyen (secretary and player) they found an available field in Crucecita East, near Dock Sud. Consequently, they began playing the Central League in Buenos Aires and finished it in Crucecita (Avellaneda suburb).

In 1907 they left the local tournaments being champions of the CFL summer tournament, ahead of Platense, as that year they were finally accepted to compete in AFA. They were about to be rejected again as the field still didn't comply with all the strict requirements, but they made it by insistence from Carlos Degiorgi.

Starting from the Second Division, their first official match in the AFA leagues was a 1–3 defeat to Comercio in Crucecita. In June of that year, they met Racing for the first time, a match that from the first moment was a derby since their new neighbors were not happy sharing the city. The derby was won by Independiente 3–2, with a goal from Rosendo Degiorgi close to the hour mark. They also met River Plate in a friendly match, where the white IFBC won 3–1 with goals from Julio Mantecón, Juan Irigoyen and Miguel Peluffo.

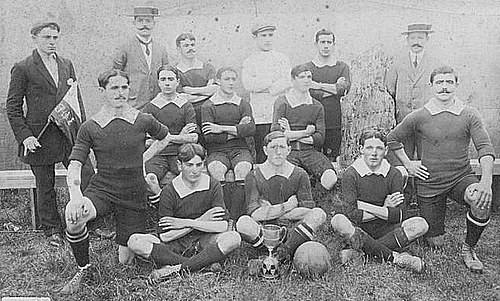
Independiente players with the club's first official trophy (1909)

There was a clear difference in level between the AFA's Second Division and the Central League to which they were accustomed. Their first participation in AFA culminated in the second-to-last place, which relegated them to the 1908 Third Division and led to the departure of some original players, such as Rosendo Degiorgi. With a bad performance at the league, poor stadium condition and the members having to travel on horse to a field far away from their houses, it was a matter of discussion whether Independiente should have continued existing, but passion for football won and further efforts were made.

Soon after, thanks to the incorporation of twelve champion footballers with Racing, who "crossed the street" after an internal conflict of that club (among them Germán Vidaillac, founder), Independiente radically changed its face and once again gained access to the Second Division after being runner-up in the only season of the club's history in Third Division, with an impressive record of 14 victories out of 14 games played (40 goals for and only 4 against), but, unfortunately, they failed to finish the season with a title as they lost the championship final to Banfield 0–3 at the Estadio GEBA. The newcomers also helped to improve the stadium condition.

Independiente adopted, also in 1908, its distinctive red color, about which there are two theories; the "traditional" one is that it was the idea of the president and goalkeeper Aristides Langone, due to his fanaticism for the English team Nottingham Forest, who toured Argentina against local teams and left the Argentine public amazed. On the other hand, it is also true that Julio Mantecón, an important member of the Socialist Party, was the general secretary and forward, for whom bright red symbolized the workers' struggle. The red shirts where accompanied by the club's first red "emblem" (a red seal), and the acronym continued to be IFBC (until 1914).

In 1909 arrived José Buruca Laforia, the club's first "professional" incorporation, with whom Independiente won its first official title as champions of the Bullrich Cup (a second-tier league cup), beating important teams of the time such as GEBA (4–0), Ferro Carril Oeste (1–0), Estudiantil Porteño (3–2) and the second teams of Alumni (1–0) and San Isidro (1–0). The final game against San Isidro was played on 8 September at the Ferro Stadium (the oldest stadium still standing in Argentina), and the winning goal was scored by Francisco Viegas. In the league, after playing two more years in the Second Division, in 1911 they were transferred to the newly created Intermediate Division.

During the Intermedia season (1911) the club continued its institutional grow, as they settled in another field in the Mitre Avenue, centre of Crucecita. There they built the Estadio Crucecita, made up completely in wood for around 4,000 spectators (later expanded to 10,000), and inaugurated with a victory over Estudiantil Porteño. That year the red team fought for the championship until the end along Estudiantes, losing to them at the last date and finishing as runners-up. However, due to the leagues being reorganized again, Independiente was promoted to the Primera División, seven years after its foundation.

On 4 February 1912 the red team won its first friendly international cup, the Anglo-Argentine Association Trophy, by 3–0 over Uruguayan side Universal, with a brace from Enrique Colla and one from Francisco Roldán.

In 14 July, 1912, Independiente debuted in the Primera División against Kimberley (winning 3–0 in Avellaneda), finishing the tournament as runners-up after the red squad decided to withdraw the final versus Porteño claiming an unfairly disallowed goal. Enrique Colla of Independiente was the top scorer of the tournament, with 12 goals. In October, the Reds traveled to Montevideo to play a match abroad for the first time, which resulted in a 2-0 victory for the Uruguayan team River Plate.

In 1914, Julio Mantecón proposed to Spanishize the club name from the original IFBC to "Club Atlético Independiente", since the English language had already fallen into disuse. The motion was approved by club president Juan Mignaburu. Later, other sports began to be added, the first being basketball.

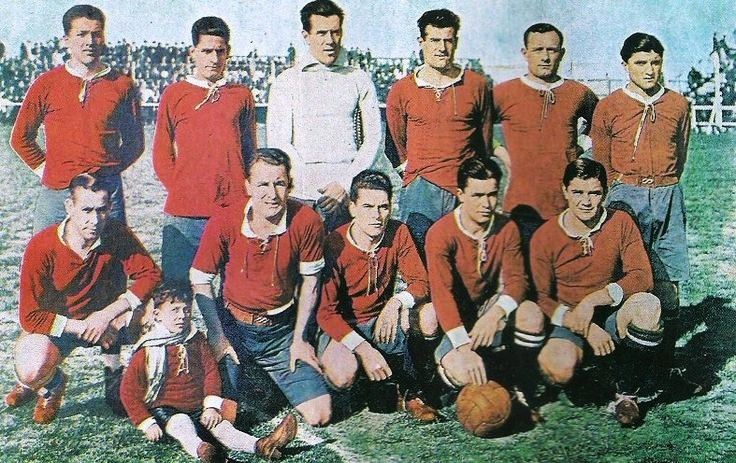
The 1926 squad won the club's second league title and the nickname Diablos Rojos

In 1916 Independiente reached the Copa Jockey Club final, which they lost to Rosario Central 1–2. The following year, they reached the final again, beating Estudiantes 2–1 and winning its first title under its current name with goals from Juan Cánepa and Guillermo Ronzoni, thus also achieving its first first-tier title and its first classification to an international tournament; the 1917 Tie Cup. There they lost to Montevideo Wanderers, Uruguayan champions, 0-4.

In relation to the previous achievement, Independiente had reached the final of the 1914 La Nación Cup, but it was cancelled because its rivals Argentino de Quilmes were disaffiliated from the AFA before the final, leaving Independiente "champions by desk".

The Avellaneda team managed to become champions of the Argentine Primera División for the first time in 1922, a tough championship where Independiente finished ahead of River Plate, San Lorenzo and Racing, who finished second, third and fourth respectively, with an impressive record of 97 goals in that season, of which Manuel Seoane scored 55 of them, keeping a record of most goals in a single Primera División championship by one player. In 1923, Independiente finished as runners-up, in part as a result of Seoane and Ronzoni being banned for one year due to an incident with a referee.

In the 1920s, international tours of British teams to Argentina were common, with which Independiente faced for the first team a European club in 1923, beating Scottish team Third Lanark 2–1 at the River Plate Stadium with a Raimundo Orsi brace.

Manuel Seoane returned to the team in 1926 and led Independiente to win its second Primera División title, being nicknamed "Diablos Rojos" (Red Devils) since this moment among the football public, after the journalist Hugo Marini of the Crítica journal described as "devilish" the forward line (the old 2-3-5 style) starring Manuel Seoane, Alberto Lalín, Raimundo Orsi, Luis Ravaschino and Zoilo Canavery.

Raimundo Orsi went on to become Independiente's first globally recognized figure, having won the 1927 Copa América and an Olympic medal for Argentina and then moving to Juventus, before winning the 1934 World Cup with the Italian national team, scoring in the Final against Czechoslovakia. Being world champion, in 1935 he returned to Independiente, possibly escaping from the Fascist regime; prior to the World Cup final, Benito Mussolini met the Italian team and demanded them to "win or die".

=== Relocation to Avellaneda ===
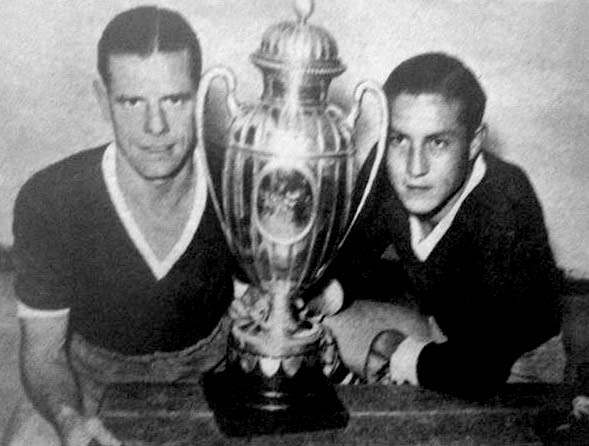
Sastre and Erico with the 1938 Copa Aldao, first international trophy

In 1925 club president Pedro Canaveri made an offer to buy the Estadio Crucecita land, but it was rejected. That meant they had to move again, so they purchased a low-priced uninhabited swampy land located within the limits of the Avellaneda city between the Racing Stadium and the Great Southern Railway tracks, further fueling the rivalry with its neighbors. There he built the Alsina y Cordero Stadium (later named "la Doble Visera"), the first cement stadium in Argentina and third in the world. It was built on a large swamp, which had to be dried and filled with tons of stone and earth. The club had to go through repeated attempts by the "racinguist" mayor of Avellaneda, Alberto Barceló, to try to sabotage the construction of the stadium by sending municipal employees to take the material, trying to paralyze the works and, finally, trying to invent a street where the swamp had just been filled in. However, the club managed to move forward with the construction, taking the cause to the main media in Buenos Aires and even firing the municipals with gunshots.

stadium was inaugurated on 8 March 1928 in a friendly against Peñarol, and served for more than ten years as the main stadium for the Argentina national team. Some of the stands where reused from the former Crucecita stadium, until they were replaced by concrete ones.

After the first experience with Third Lanark, new European clubs made it to Argentina, and consequently Independiente beat FC Barcelona (Spanish champions) 4–1 in 1928 and Bologna (Italian champions) 1–0 in 1929. They also faced Chelsea (1–1 tie) and Torino (1–2 defeat). Contrary to the Europeans, Independiente was still an amateur club. Arcadi Balaguer, president of FC Barcelona, became surprised after realizing that Independiente defender Guillermo Ronzoni was the guy selling tickets at the stadium's entrance a few minutes before the match started. That day, the Diablos Rojos won the Catalans with a brace from Manuel Seoane and a goal from Canavery and Orsi each, with the Argentine coat of arms sewn on the jersey by initiative of the Argentine President Hipólito Yrigoyen.

Independiente was among the 18 clubs that broke from AFA to form the Liga Argentina de Football in 1931, the first professional league in the country. They also were already considered one of the Big Five, along Boca Juniors, Racing, River Plate and San Lorenzo. Zoilo Canavery, who retired in 1930 wearing the red shirt, was appointed as the club's first official manager in 1932.

Manuel Seoane retired in 1933 with an impressive record of 241 goals in 264 appearances with the red shirt, setting a record of all time scorer of the Primera División. At the end of the 1930s the club, now professional, entered a path of titles led by its three new figures: Arsenio Erico, Antonio Sastre and Vicente de la Mata, one of the most offensive tridents in the history of football, with 556 goals in total. This team led Independiente to win two Primera championships (1938 and 1939), three national cups and three international cups. In 1938 they won the club's first international title at the legendary Estadio Centenario in Montevideo (place where Uruguay was world champion in 1930), beating Peñarol 3–1 with goals from De la Mata, Zorrilla and Erico. The coach responsible for the two triple crowns was Guillermo Ronzoni, today the winningest coach in the history of Independiente, who also was a defender between 1917 and 1928.

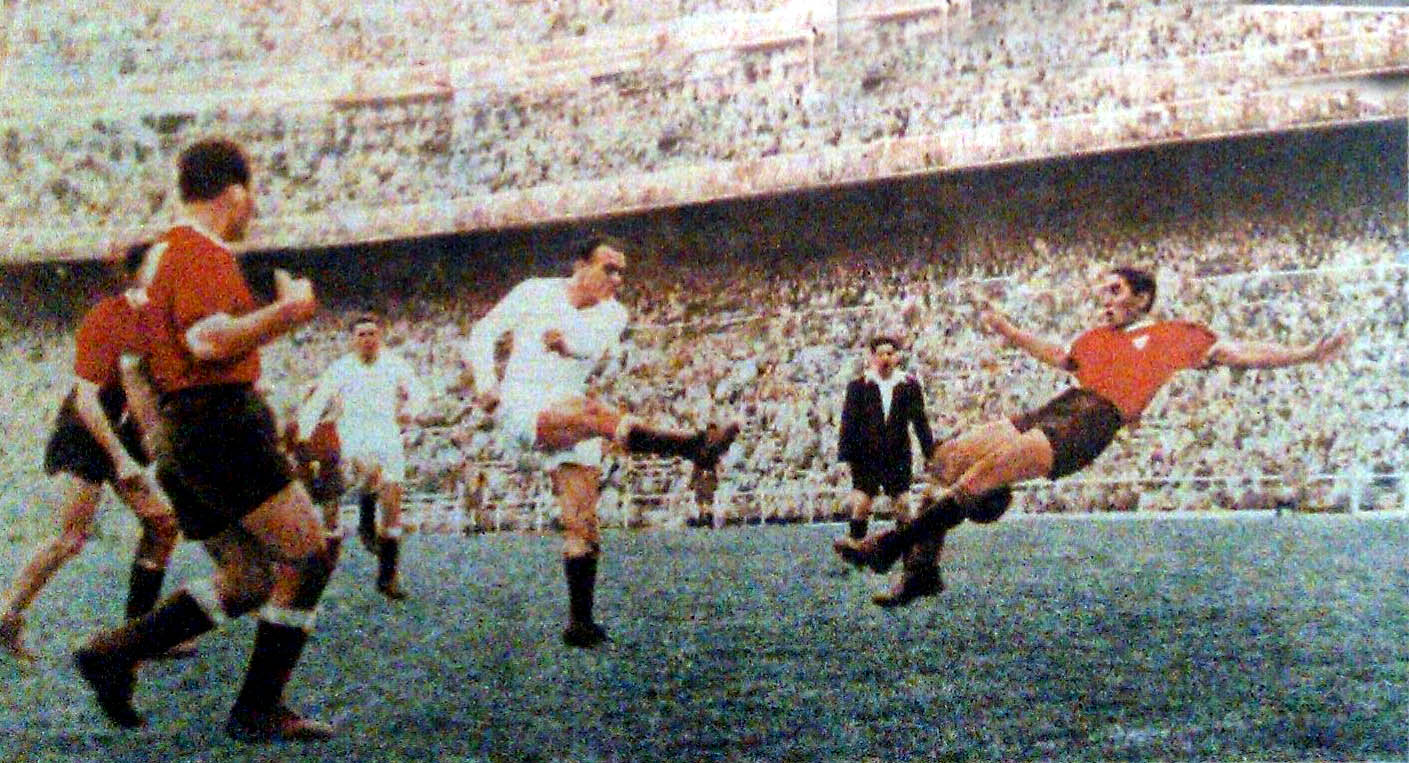
Independiente friendly match v Real Madrid in 1953

In 1939, an Independiente-River Plate combined team beat 3–1 a Flamengo-Vasco da Gama combination, in an overcrowded Estadio Gasómetro, winning the "Copa Confraternidad Argentino-Brasileña". Erico and Juan Maril of Independiente scored two out of the three Argentine goals. At the end of 1939, the Independiente team toured Brazil for the first time, meeting clubs Vasco da Gama, Flamengo, Botafogo, Atlético Mineiro, América Mineiro, Internacional and Grêmio. The peak moment of the tour was an 8-1 victory over Botafogo. In 1941 they won the Ministry of the Treasury Cup in Paraguay by 4–2 over Cerro Porteño, champions of that country.

In 1940 the biggest win in the Clásico de Avellaneda took place, with Independiente defeating Racing 7–0 with braces from Zorrilla, Erico, De la Mata and one from Leguizamón. That same day, the same record had already occurred among the reserve teams, where Independiente won 10–0. The famous offensive trident was dismantled in 1941 with the departure of Antonio Sastre to São Paulo. Some time later the Argentine Football Association considered him the "most complete Argentine player of all time."

Arsenio Erico, for his part, retired in 1946 having become the new top scorer in the history of the Argentine Primera División with 295 goals (a record he still holds) overshadowing Manuel Seoane's record, and Vicente de la Mata was the last to retire, leading "el Rojo" to become champions in 1948 under the coaching of Fernando Bello, who was the goalkeeper for eleven seasons between 1933 and 1944. Alfredo Di Stéfano (2008) considered Arsenio Erico "the most extraordinary player" he saw in his life.

In 1953 the Avellaneda team made its first tour of Europe, where it debuted at the Bernabéu Stadium achieving a historic 6-0 win over Real Madrid at a full stadium, a Real Madrid starring Alfredo Di Stéfano, Paco Gento and other future "Galácticos" who would later win five consecutive European Cups. Rodolfo Micheli scored a hat-trick, while the other three goals were scored by Bonelli, Grillo and Cecconatto.

The European tour continued with a 2–1 against Benfica, 8–1 against Sporting in Portugal, 5-3 against Atlético Madrid and 3-0 against Valencia in the Mestalla. The tour concluded with defeats to FC Rouen in France and Huddersfield Town in England, both 2-3. In Avellaneda they also hosted several powerful teams of the time, winning 4–2 against Rot-Weiss (champions of West Germany) in 1954, 6–1 against La Chaux-de-Fonds (champions of Switzerland) in 1954, 3–0 against Red Star (champions of Yugoslavia) in 1955, 1-0 against CSKA Sofia (champions of Bulgaria) in 1962, 2–0 against FC Dinamo Moscow (champions of the Soviet Union) in 1963, 3–0 against Austria Vienna (champions of Austria) in 1964, 3–2 against Sparta Prague (champions of Czechoslovakia) in 1966, and 4-1 against Torpedo Moscow (champions of the Soviet Union) in 1969.

=== The golden era ===
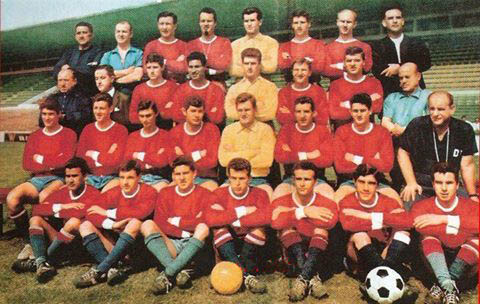
The 1963 squad won the league and later went on to win the club's first two Copa Libertadores

The "golden era" of the club started in the early 1960s, along the birth of the South American continental cups. As 1963 Primera División champions, they won the Copa Libertadores de América for the first time in 1964, being the first Argentine team to do so, beating Millonarios (champions of Colombia), Alianza Lima (champions of Peru) and Santos (champions of Brazil) in the initial phases, and in the final against Nacional (champions of Uruguay) 1–0, with a goal from Mario Rodríguez Varela. Then they defended the title in 1965, won four consecutive Libertadores in 1972, 1973, 1974, 1975, and obtained his last one in 1984, establishing themselves as the competition's top winner with seven titles, to which are added the difficult records of being champions in four consecutive editions; and seven finals played, without having lost any of them. As a colorful note, in the 1964 Libertadores they eliminated in the semifinals the difficult team of the Brazilian Santos, current two-time world champion, starring Pelé and other stars of the two-time world champion Brazilian national team. The English magazine FourFourTwo (2024) described Independiente from 1971-1975 as the third best team in the history of the Americas, just behind Santos from 1955-1968 and Brazil from 1970.

It is also worth noting that Independiente achieved its Copa Libertadores title record after winning its fourth one at the 1973 finals defeating Chilean champions Colo-Colo 2-1 at Estadio Centenario, therefore surpassing Peñarol and Estudiantes three-title record. That same year, the red team also achieved the 1973 Copa Interamericana and the 1973 Intercontinental Cup, giving rise to the nickname of "Rey de Copas" (King of Cups).

In 1975, the club from Avellaneda made its first tour of Asia, performing friendly games against Indonesian and Hong Kong teams. Since almost all Asian teams wore red, and Independiente didn't carry any alternative kits, they were given yellow Sweden jerseys, which were later used in the 1975 Copa Libertadores finals against Unión Española.

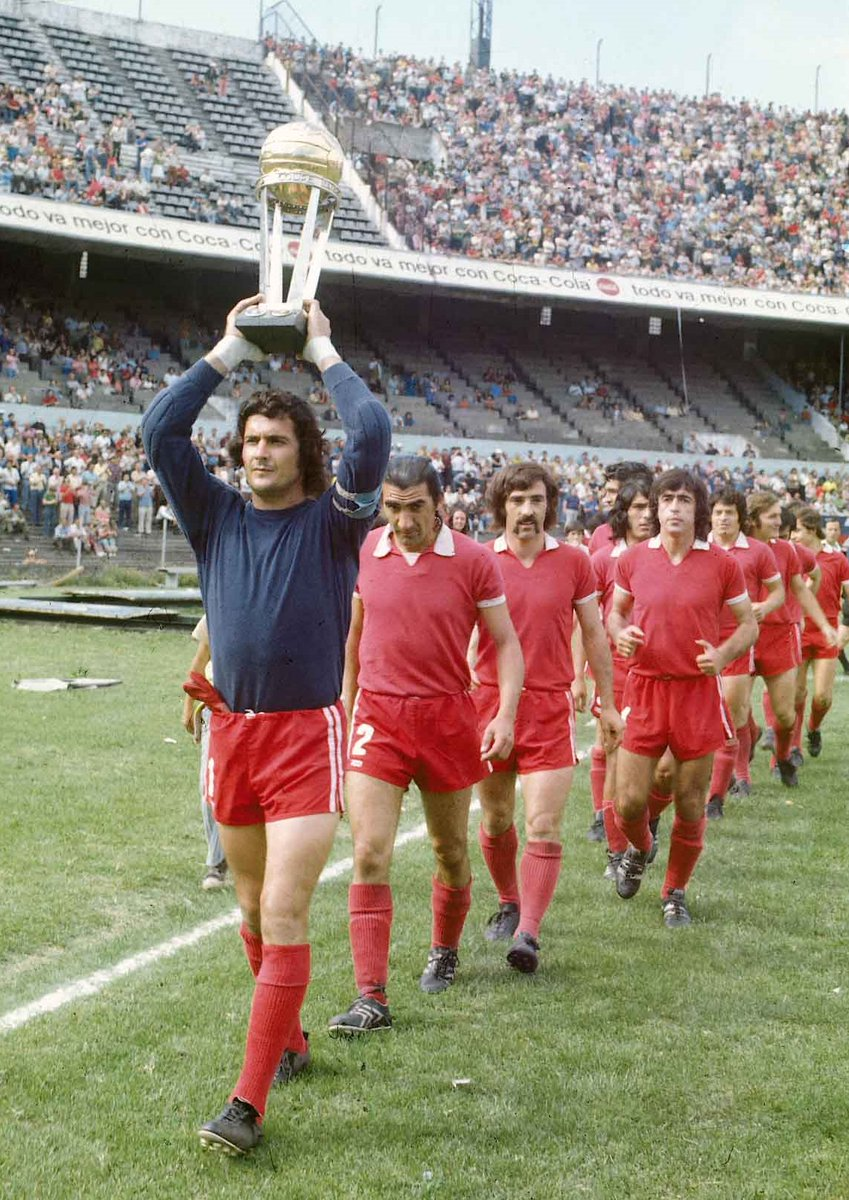
The 1973 Intercontinental Cup gave rise to the "Rey de Copas" tag

At the 1976 Copa Libertadores, after four years of success, the red team finally got knocked out by River Plate 1–0 in the semifinals, very close of reaching a fifth consecutive final. However, soonly after they won the postponed 1976 Copa Interamericana (the third in a row) against Mexican side Atlético Español through the penalty shoot-out after two ties at the Venezuelan Olympic Stadium.

At the local level, Independiente continued to win titles. The most particular was the 1977 Nacional, a tournament where they faced Talleres in the final. Having tied in Avellaneda, the teams played the definition in Córdoba. The Córdoba team took the lead with a controversial handball goal, validated by referee Barreiro, who also sent off three Independiente players for protesting. However, with only seven field players, Independiente won through an excellent goal from a play scored by Ricardo Bochini shortly before the end of the match. The main media stated that the referee would have been, at halftime, "influenced" by Luciano B. Menéndez, one of the generals of the civil-military dictatorship. Bochini (2010) stated that this fact cost him the call to the 1978 and 1982 World Cups, making his debut in 1986 against Belgium.

In 1983, another unprecedented event occurred again at the local level when Independiente became Argentine champion, competing on the last date in La Doble Visera against archi-rivals Racing, a team that was relegated to Primera B for the first time in its history. This title led to winning the 1984 Copa Libertadores, the club's seventh, beating Grêmio in the finals with a goal from Jorge Burruchaga.

On the world stage, they won the aforementioned Copa Interamericana three times, in 1973, 1974 and 1976 against the CONCACAF champions, and participated six times in the prestigious Intercontinental Cup; being world champion in 1973, beating Italian Juventus 1–0 at the Stadio Olimpico in Rome (goal by Bochini), and in 1984, beating Liverpool at the Tokyo Olympic Stadium (goal by José Percudani). The duel against Liverpool was special, since it was the first confrontation between Argentine and British teams after the Falklands War that occurred two years earlier and marked the end of the civil-military dictatorship. The entire Argentine public supported Independiente, and its victory gave it the nickname of "National Pride" in all the newspapers. The other four participations in the Intercontinental ended in defeats against Inter Milan (twice), Ajax Amsterdam and Atlético Madrid (although not without having visited historic stadiums such as the San Siro, the Bernabéu, the Amsterdam Olympic and Vicente Calderón). Ricardo Bochini, who completed a long career at the club between 1973 and 1991, is remembered as the institution's greatest idol, scoring the goal against Juventus and having a 19-year career at Independiente, where he won twelve titles (record which he shares with Ricardo Pavoni).

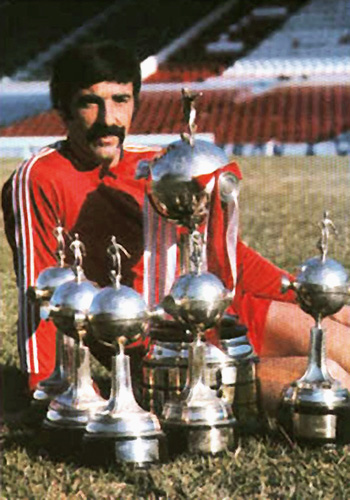
Pavoni with five Libertadores trophies at Independiente Stadium

Other highlights on the non-competitive stage include the winning of the 1965 Consular Cup 2–1 on aggregate over Napoli (first in New York and then in Toronto), beating Greek Panathinaikos (champions of Europe) 1–0 in Athens in 1972, beating Inter Milan 1–0 in the Estadio Azteca in 1974, tying 2–2 with the famous American team New York Cosmos on their 1985 farewell season, and playing an unofficial club world championship in 1989 against Arsenal (champions of England), which they lost in Miami 2–1.

In 1994 and 1995, "el Rojo" obtained two more international titles; the two-time Supercopa Libertadores, the first against Boca Juniors and the second against a Romário-led Flamengo, at the latter becoming the first foreign club to be crowned champions at the Maracanã Stadium in Rio de Janeiro, before an impressive attendance of 105,000 Brazilian spectators. They also won the 1995 Recopa Sudamericana, played at the Tokyo Olympic Stadium (same place where they beat Liverpool in 1984).

Additionally, they won the 1994 Copa Presidente Carlos Menem by defeating Napoli 3–2 in the semifinals and Roma 2–1 in the final in Mar del Plata. Before playing the 1995 Recopa, the red team faced and won Sanfrecce Hiroshima 5–0 and Urawa Red Diamonds 5–3. One year later, Independiente travelled once again all the way to Japan to contest the 1996 Recopa Sudamericana in Kōbe, but this time they lost 1–4 to Grêmio. In 1997, they beat Feyenoord 3–0 in Mar del Plata, with the Dutchmen starring Ronald Koeman.

The "golden era" of Independiente came to an end in 1995 and, from then on, the sporting achievements occurred in a more isolated way. Nothing that relevant occurred between the 1995–2010 period, except for the isolated 2002 Aperture title, where the pillar was team captain Gabriel Milito. In 2004 club legend José Pastoriza died while at his fifth stint as the club manager. Some days before, Independiente won the DAIA Cup 1–0 to El Salvador. Among other players, a young Sergio Agüero was sold to Atlético Madrid for a record US$28,75 million in 2006, which was planned to be used for a complete renovation of the La Doble Visera to a brand new stadium.

=== New stadium and hard times ===
As the old Doble Visera stadium was in severe decay, the project of a new and modern stadium advanced, made possible by the Sergio Agüero record transfer to Europe. On 8 December, 2006, the farewell match took place against Gimnasia with 1–2 defeat. While the Estadio Libertadores de América was under construction, Independiente acted as home team at several Primera División stadiums, mostly the near Racing Stadium. The "Estadio LDA" was officially inaugurated on 28 October, 2009 with a 3-2 victory over Colón. However, as the construction costs were higher than the estimated, it was inaugurated half built, even with the old Almirante Cordero grandstand left standing.

Despite the also millionaire transfers of Oscar Ustari and Germán Denis, Independiente went through critical moments in the institutional and football sphere with million-dollar debts, embargoes, inhibitions from AFA and FIFA and even bankruptcy petitions. The team finished at the league's last places on various occasions. However, the club performed well at the 2009–10 season and qualified to the 2010 Copa Sudamericana, which they won at home soil after defeating Goiás at the finals through the penalty shootout. Nonetheless, at the same time they finished at the bottom place of the 2010 Aperture. On the fifth date of the 2012 Clausura, Independiente beat reigning Argentine champions Boca Juniors 5–4 away at La Bombonera.

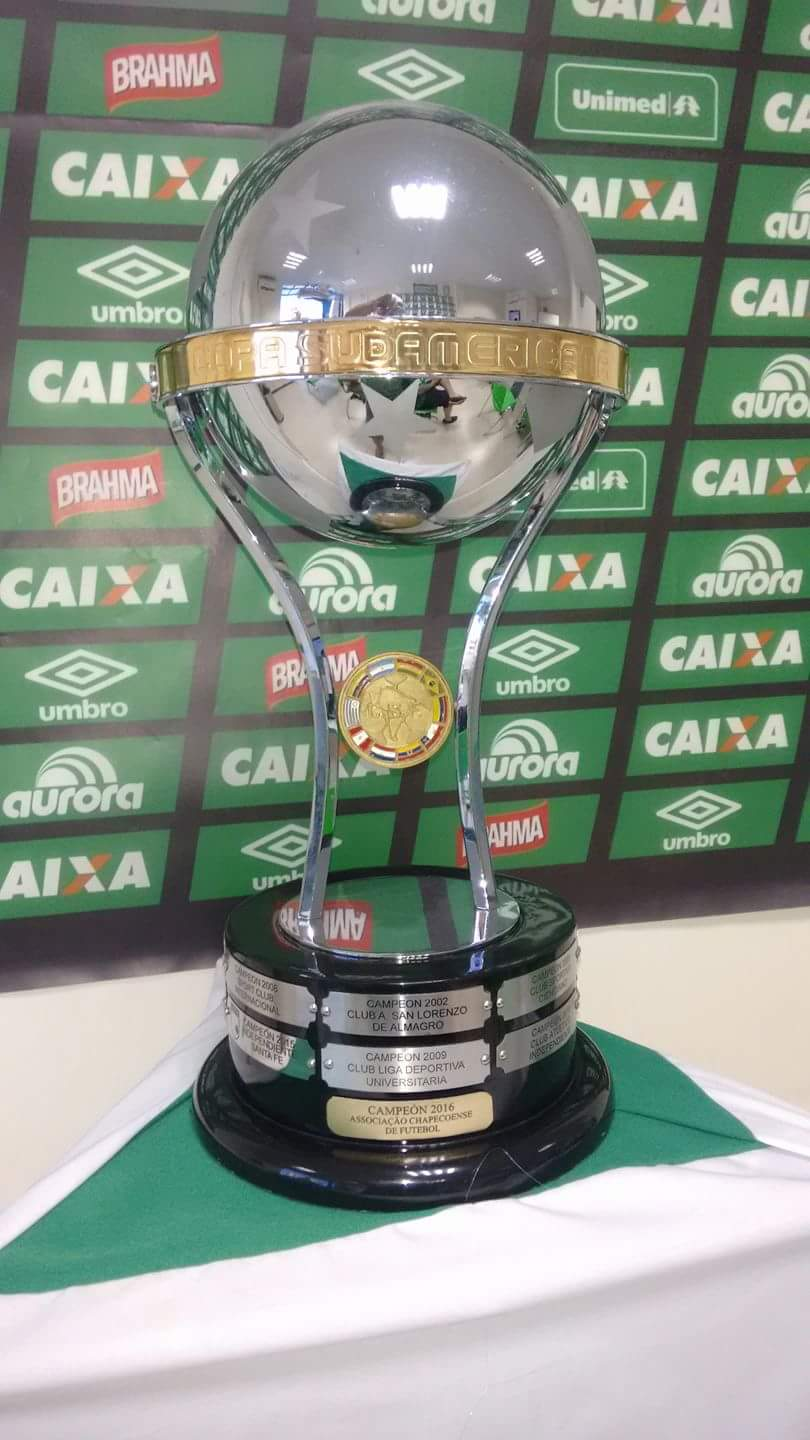
In the new century, Independiente won two Copas Sudamericanas (2010 and 2017).

As a result of the poor performances since the 2010 Aperture, aggravated by the bad management and institutional crises, Independiente finished in second-to-last place in the point averages at the end of the 2012-13 season, getting relegated to the Primera B Nacional for the first time after 101 years in the Primera División (after a 0-1 home loss to San Lorenzo at the second-to-last date) alongside San Martín (18th) and Unión (20th). At the institutional level, the crisis had the Estadio Libertadores de América half built and in a state of abandonment, like all the facilities and club training fields, and the club directors being threatened by barra bravas (hooligans). One month later, the team debuted in the B with a 1-2 home defeat to a promoted third division team, Brown, remaining five rounds without knowing the victory and facing relegation to the Primera B Metropolitana.

Despite the serious macroeconomic crisis of the club, former champion players Daniel Montenegro, Federico Insúa, Federico Mancuello and Facundo Parra returned to lend a hand, with whom "el Rojo" recovered from the bad start and achieved promotion again in 2014 by winning a final for the third promotion spot to Huracán. Under the presidency of Hugo Moyano, chief of the CGT, Independiente advanced in the completion works of the stadium and was champion in the 2017 Copa Sudamericana versus Vinícius Júnior's Flamengo and, later, the 2018 Suruga Bank Championship held in Osaka, Japan, which extended the international record of the club recognized by CONMEBOL to 18 titles and recovered its record as the club with the most international titles in the Americas (shared with Boca Juniors). The team captain Nicolás Tagliafico continued his career in AFC Ajax and ultimately won two times the Copa América and the 2022 FIFA World Cup with the Argentine national team along goalkeeper Emiliano Martínez, who also emerged from Independiente's youth ranks.

Between the sales of important players the club earned approximately US$42 million. But despite this, in 2022 the Moyanos left the presidency of the club having once again led it to another critical financial situation, with more than US$22 million in debt. By 2023, in addition to former players, Independiente was in big debt with four Mexican clubs (América, UNAM, Tijuana and Mazatlán), with the América one putting Independiente under a TAS-imposed embargo. As a result, a collection was carried out among fans and other donors through a digital wallet raising US$3.5 million, an amount of money that managed to help the club lift that dangerous embargo. At the same time, the team had the worst Primera División campaign in its history, finishing the tournament in 24th place. However, after an austere season and a strong appreciation of the Argentine peso under the Presidency of Javier Milei, the club overcame the red numbers and earned a spot to the 2025 Copa Sudamericana. However, the team was disqualified from the competition after clashes broke out between spectators at a match against Universidad de Chile at the Estadio Libertadores de América in Buenos Aires, resulting in 10 injuries, 90 arrests, and the suspension of the game.

== Kit and badge ==
First emblem of Independiente, inspired on St. Andrew's A.C.

The first shirt worn by the club since its foundation in 1904 was white, with a blue badge on its chest with the acronym "IFBC" ("Independiente Football Club"). That badge was inspired on St. Andrew's Athletic Club's. a club established by Scottish descendants that had been the first Primera División champion in 1891.

The traditional red shirt was not worn until 1908, and was inspired on English side Nottingham Forest, which had toured Argentina in 1905. Independiente executives were so impressed by the performance of The Forest that they decide to adopt the red colors for the club. The red shirt debuted on 10 May 1908.

The first badge of the club was also inspired on Saint Andrew's and was used until 1912 when the club switched to a red seal. The logo changed again in 1930, being the closest version of the current emblem. It has been modified (with minor alterations) several times since then.

== Stadium ==
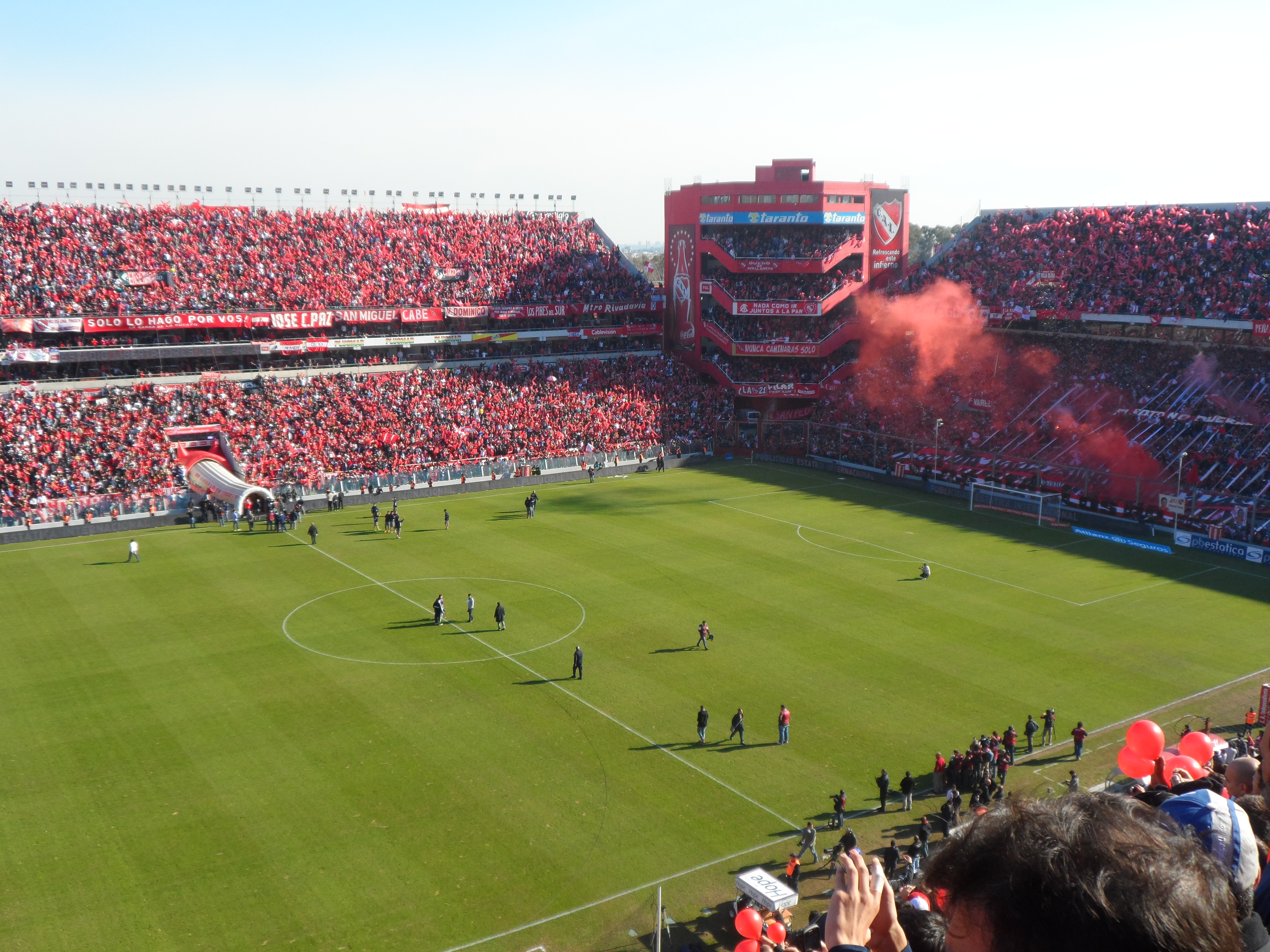
The Libertadores de América Stadium in 2014.

Independiente plays home matches at the Libertadores de América–Ricardo Enrique Bochini Stadium, located in Avellaneda, Buenos Aires Province, with a capacity of 49,000. Opened unfinished in 2009 and completed in 2016 (except for the roof), it stands beside the General Roca Railway tracks.

The stadium was built on the site of the historic Doble Visera, used from 1928 to 2006, where Independiente won national and international titles and hosted early Argentina national team matches. It was Argentina’s first concrete stadium and the third worldwide.

During construction (2006–2010), the club played home games at the stadiums of Lanús, Huracán, and Racing, including key matches in the 2010 Copa Sudamericana, which it won.

Before moving to Avellaneda in 1906, Independiente had various home grounds in Buenos Aires, notably in Flores, La Paternal, and Recoleta, including a site later used by River Plate at Alvear and Tagle.

Its first stadium in Avellaneda was a rented field in East Crucecita (1906–1911), followed by the West Crucecita Stadium, used from 1911 to 1928.

== Players ==
=== Current squad ===
As of 11 November 2026

Note: Flags indicate national team as defined under FIFA eligibility rules; some limited exceptions apply. Players may hold more than one non-FIFA nationality.

| No. | Pos. | Nation | Player |
|---|---|---|---|
| 1 | GK | ARG | Joaquín Blázquez (on loan from Talleres) |
| 2 | DF | ARG | Franco Calderón (on loan from Universidad de Chile) |
| 3 | DF | ARG | Jonathan De Irastorza |
| 4 | DF | COL | Santiago Arias |
| 6 | FW | ARG | Chimy Ávila |
| 7 | FW | ARG | Santiago Montiel |
| 8 | FW | ARG | Maximiliano Meza |
| 9 | FW | CHI | Iván Morales (on loan from Argentinos Juniors) |
| 10 | MF | CHI | Luciano Cabral |
| 13 | DF | ARG | Juan Fedorco |
| 14 | MF | CHI | Lautaro Millán |
| 15 | FW | ARG | Imanol Machuca |
| 16 | MF | ARG | Mateo Pérez Curci |

| No. | Pos. | Nation | Player |
|---|---|---|---|
| 19 | FW | URU | Matías Abaldo |
| 20 | FW | ARG | Rodrigo Márquez |
| 22 | DF | ARG | Facundo Zabala |
| 23 | MF | ARG | Iván Marcone (vice-captain) |
| 29 | DF | ARG | Leonardo Godoy |
| 32 | MF | ARG | David Martínez |
| 33 | GK | ARG | Rodrigo Rey (captain) |
| 34 | FW | ARG | Felipe Tempone |
| 35 | DF | ARG | Juan Miguel Arrayago |
| 36 | DF | ARG | Sebastián Valdez |
| 37 | MF | ARG | Joel Medina |
| 40 | MF | ARG | Ignacio Malcorra |
| 77 | GK | URU | Santiago Mele (on loan from Monterrey) |

=== Reserve squad ===
Note: Flags indicate national team as defined under FIFA eligibility rules; some limited exceptions apply. Players may hold more than one non-FIFA nationality.

| No. | Pos. | Nation | Player |
|---|---|---|---|
| 24 | MF | ARG | Josías Palais |
| 30 | MF | ARG | Tomás Parmo |
| 31 | DF | ARG | Gonzalo Bordón |
| 38 | DF | ARG | Luciano Barros Ayala |

| No. | Pos. | Nation | Player |
|---|---|---|---|
| 41 | FW | ARG | Mathías De Las Carreras |
| 42 | DF | ARG | Fernando Closter |
| 51 | FW | HUN | Simón Bodnar |
| 53 | FW | ARG | Santino Viollaz |

=== Out on loan ===
Note: Flags indicate national team as defined under FIFA eligibility rules; some limited exceptions apply. Players may hold more than one non-FIFA nationality.

| No. | Pos. | Nation | Player |
|---|---|---|---|
| 2 | DF | ARG | Federico Vera (at Huracán until 31 December 2026) |
| 4 | DF | ARG | Patricio Ostachuk (at Atlanta until 31 December 2026) |
| 5 | MF | URU | Rodrigo Fernández Cedrés (at Huracán until 31 December 2027) |
| 8 | MF | ARG | Kevin López (at San Martín de Tucumán until 31 December 2026) |
| 16 | FW | ARG | Facundo Valdez (at Boston River until 30 June 2027) |
| 17 | FW | ARG | Walter Mazzantti (at Newell's Old Boys until 31 December 2026) |
| 18 | FW | ARG | Ignacio Maestro Puch (at Puebla until 31 December 2026) |
| 18 | FW | ARG | Tomás Rambert (at Ciudad de Bolívar until 31 December 2026) |
| 19 | FW | ITA | Lucas Román (at Atlético Tucumán until 31 December 2026) |
| 22 | FW | ARG | Chaco Martínez (at Everton until 31 December 2026) |

| No. | Pos. | Nation | Player |
|---|---|---|---|
| 24 | FW | ARG | Santiago López (at Tigre until 31 December 2026) |
| 25 | FW | ARG | Ignacio Pussetto (at Huracán until 31 December 2027) |
| 25 | GK | URU | Diego Segovia (at Deportivo Maldonado until 31 December 2026) |
| 28 | MF | ECU | Jhonny Quiñónez (at Barcelona SC until 31 December 2026) |
| 28 | FW | ARG | Enzo Taborda (at Barracas Central until 31 December 2026) |
| 32 | DF | ARG | Franco Paredes (at Argentinos Juniors until 31 December 2026) |
| 35 | MF | ARG | Santiago Salle (at Sarmiento (Junín) until 31 December 2026) |
| 38 | DF | ARG | Agustín Quiroga (at Central Córdoba until 31 December 2026) |
| 42 | MF | ARG | Sergio Ortíz (at Los Andes until 31 December 2026) |
| 49 | FW | ARG | Alan Daian Laprida (at Central Córdoba until 31 December 2026) |

=== Individual records ===
==== Most appearances ====
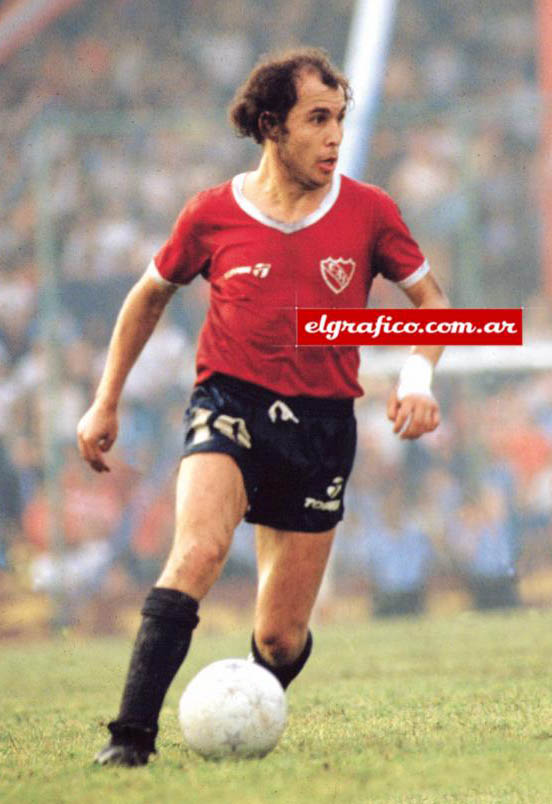
Ricardo Bochini has the record of matches played

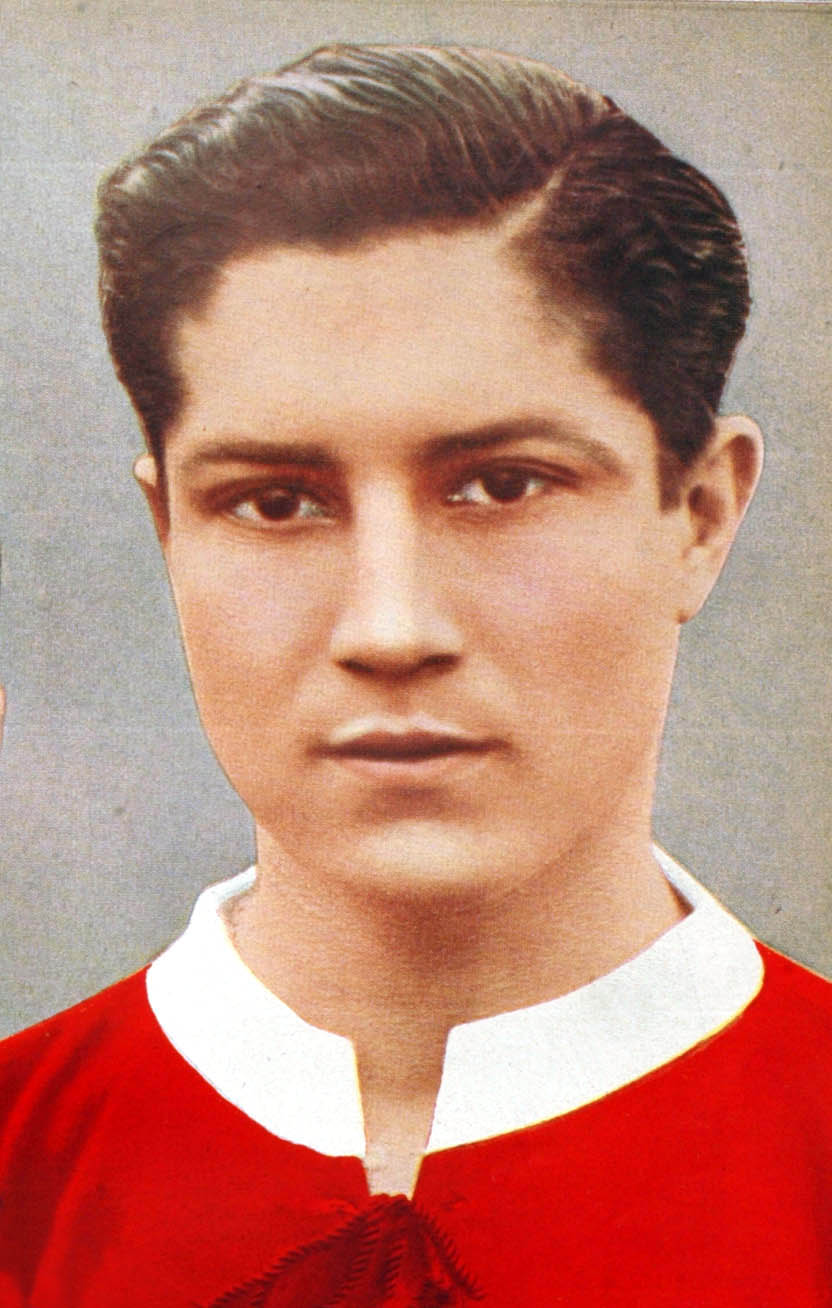
Arsenio Erico, all-time top scorer

| No. | Player | Pos. | Tenure | Match. |
|---|---|---|---|---|
| 1 | (Argentina) Ricardo Bochini | MF | 1972–91 | 638 |
| 2 | (Uruguay) Ricardo Pavoni | DF | 1965–76 | 423 |
| 3 | (Argentina) Hugo Villaverde | DF | 1975–89 | 380 |
| 4 | (Argentina) Miguel Ángel Santoro | GK | 1962–74 | 343 |
| 5 | (Argentina) Guillermo D. Ríos | DF | 1984–98 | 338 |

==== Top scorers ====
| No. | Player | Pos. | Tenure | Goals | Match. |
|---|---|---|---|---|---|
| 1 | (Paraguay) Arsenio Erico | FW | 1933–1946 | 295 | 325 |
| 2 | (Argentina) Manuel Seoane | FW | 1921–23, 1926–33 | 233 | 264 |
| 3 | (Argentina) Vicente de la Mata | FW | 1937–50 | 152 | 362 |
| 4 | (Argentina) Luis Ravaschino | FW | 1923–34 | 135 | 285 |
| 5 | (Argentina) Antonio Sastre | MF | 1923–34 | 112 | 340 |
| 6 | (Argentina) Ricardo Bochini | MF | 1972–91 | 97 | 638 |
| 7 | (Argentina) Norberto Outes | FW | 1975–80 | 90 | 173 |
| 7 | (Argentina) Ernesto Grillo | FW | 1949–57 | 90 | 194 |
| 7 | (Argentina) (Italy) Raimundo Orsi | FW | 1920–28, 1935 | 90 | 219 |
| 8 | (Argentina) Camilo Cerviño | FW | 1943–49, 1955–58 | 89 | 192 |
| 9 | (Argentina) Daniel Bertoni | FW | 1973–77 | 80 | 179 |
| 10 | (Argentina) Aníbal Tarabini | FW | 1966–70 | 77 | 173 |

=== Top-scorers by season ===
The following tables lists the players that have been named top scorers playing for Independiente in Primera División. Independiente has 15 top scorers.

| Season | Player | Goals |
|---|---|---|
| 1912 FAF | (Argentina) Ernesto Colla | 12 |
| 1922 AAmF | (Argentina) Manuel Seoane | 55 |
| 1924 AAmF | (Argentina) Luis Ravaschino (Note: Along with Ricardo Lucarelli of Sportivo Buenos Aires, who also scored 15 goals.) | 15 |
| 1926 AAmF | (Argentina) Manuel Seoane | 29 |
| 1929 | (Argentina) Manuel Seoane (Note: Along with Juan Cortesse of San Lorenzo, who also scored 13 goals.) | 13 |
| 1937 | (Paraguay) Arsenio Erico | 48 |
| 1938 | (Paraguay) Arsenio Erico | 43 |
| 1939 | (Paraguay) Arsenio Erico | 41 |
| 1956 | (Argentina) Ernesto Grillo (Note: Along with Juan Castro, player of Rosario Central, who also scored 17 goals.) | 17 |
| 1966 | (Argentina) Luis Artime | 23 |
| 1967 Nacional | (Argentina) Luis Artime | 11 |
| 1982 Metropolitano | (Argentina) Carlos Manuel Morete | 20 |
| 1999 Clausura | (Argentina) José Luis Calderón | 17 |
| 2002 Apertura | (Argentina) Andrés Silvera | 16 |
| 2007 Apertura | (Argentina) Germán Denis | 18 |

== Previous managers ==
- (Hungary) Máximo Garay (1936)
- (Brazil) Osvaldo Brandão (1961–63)
- (Argentina) Manuel Giúdice (1963–66)
- (Brazil) Osvaldo Brandão (1967)
- (Argentina) Roberto Ferreiro (1973–74)
- (Argentina) José Pastoriza (1976–79)
- (Argentina) Miguel Ángel Santoro (1980)
- (Argentina) José Pastoriza (1983–84), (1985–87)
- (Argentina) Jorge Solari (1987–89)
- (Argentina) José Pastoriza (1990–91)
- (Argentina) Carlos Fren & (Argentina) Ricardo Bochini (1991)
- (Argentina) Miguel Ángel Brindisi (1994–95)
- (Uruguay) Ricardo Pavoni (1995)
- (Uruguay) Gregorio Pérez (1995–96)
- (Argentina) César Luis Menotti (July 1996 – June 97)
- (Argentina) Ricardo Gareca (1997)
- (Argentina) César Luis Menotti (1997–99)
- (Argentina) Enzo Trossero (1999–2000)
- (Argentina) Osvaldo Piazza (2000–2002)
- (Argentina) Miguel Ángel Santoro (2001)
- (Argentina) Néstor Clausen (Jan 2001 – Dec 2001)
- (Argentina) Américo Gallego (2002–2003)
- (Argentina) Oscar Ruggeri (2003)
- (Argentina) Osvaldo Sosa (2003)
- (Argentina) José Pastoriza (2003–2004)
- (Argentina) César Luis Menotti (2004)
- (Argentina) Miguel Ángel Santoro (2005)
- (Argentina) Julio Falcioni (July 2005 – June 2006)
- (Argentina) Jorge Burruchaga (July 2006 – April 2007)
- (Argentina) Pedro Troglio (2007 – 2008)
- (Argentina) M.A. Santoro (interim) (April 2008 – May 2008)
- (Argentina) Claudio Borghi (May 2008 – Oct 2008)
- (Argentina) Miguel Ángel Santoro (Oct 2008 – March 2009)
- (Argentina) Américo Gallego (March 2009 – June 2010)
- (Argentina) César Luis Menotti (July 2009 – Oct 2010)
- (Argentina) Daniel Garnero (July 2010 – Sept 2010)
- (Argentina) Antonio Mohamed (Oct 2010 – Sept 2011)
- (Argentina) Ramón Díaz (Sept 2011 – March 2012)
- (Argentina) Christian Díaz (March 2012 – Aug 2012)
- (Argentina) Américo Gallego (Aug 2012 – April 2013)
- (Argentina) Miguel Ángel Brindisi (April 2013 – Aug 2013)
- (Argentina) Omar De Felippe (Aug 2013 – July 2014)
- (Argentina) Jorge Almirón (July 2014 – May 2015)
- (Argentina) Mauricio Pellegrino (May 2015 – Jun 2016)
- (Argentina) Gabriel Milito (Jun 2016 – Dec 2016)
- (Argentina) Ariel Holan (Jan 2017 – May 2019)
- (Argentina) Sebastián Beccacece (May 2019 - Oct 2019)
- (Argentina) Fernando Berón (Oct 2019 - Dec 2019)
- (Argentina) Lucas Pusineri (Dec 2019 - Jan 2021)
- (Argentina) Fernando Berón (Jan 2021)
- (Argentina) Julio Falcioni (Jan 2021 – Dec 2021)
- (Argentina) Eduardo Domínguez (Jan 2022 – Jul 2022)
- (Argentina) Julio Falcioni (Aug 2022 – Dec 2022)
- (Argentina) Leandro Stillitano (Jan 2023 – Apr 2023)
- (Argentina) Ricardo Zielinski (Apr 2023 – Aug 2023)
- (Argentina) Carlos Tevez (Aug 2023 – May 2024)
- (Argentina) Julio Vaccari (Jun 2024 - Sept 2025)

== Honours ==
=== Senior titles ===
Keys

- Record
- ^{(s)} Shared record

| Type | Competition | Titles | Winning years |
|---|---|---|---|
| National (League) | Primera División | 16 | 1922 AAm, (Note: The "Asociación Amateurs de Football" (AAm) was a dissident league which organized its own championships from 1919 to 1926.) 1926 AAm, 1938, 1939, 1948, 1960, 1963, 1967 Nacional, 1970 Metropolitano, 1971 Metropolitano, 1977 Nacional, 1978 Nacional, 1983 Metropolitano, 1988–89, 1994 Clausura, 2002 Apertura |
| National (Cups) | Copa de Competencia (AAmF) | 3 | 1924, 1925, 1926 |
| National (Cups) | Copa Ibarguren | 2 | 1938, 1939 |
| National (Cups) | Copa Adrián C. Escobar | 1 | 1939 |
| National (Cups) | Copa de Competencia La Nación (FAF) | 1^{(s)} | 1914 |
| National (Cups) | Copa Jockey Club | 1 | 1917 |
| National (Cups) | Copa de Honor MCBA | 1 | 1918 |
| Continental | Copa Libertadores (Note: CONMEBOL competition) | 7 | 1964, 1965, 1972, 1973, 1974, 1975, 1984 |
| Continental | Copa Interamericana (Note: Organised by CONMEBOL and CONCACAF) | 3 | 1972, 1974, 1975 |
| Continental | Supercopa Libertadores | 2^{(s)} | 1994, 1995 |
| Continental | Copa Sudamericana | 2 | 2010, 2017 |
| Continental | Recopa Sudamericana | 1 | 1995 |
| Continental | Suruga Bank Championship (Note: Organised by JFA and CONMEBOL) | 1 | 2018 |
| Continental | Copa Aldao (Note: Organised by AFA and AUF together) | 2 | 1938, 1939 |
| Worldwide | Intercontinental Cup (Note: Organised by UEFA and CONMEBOL together) | 2 | 1973, 1984 |

=== Other titles ===
Titles won in lower divisions:

- Copa Bullrich (1): 1909 (Note: The Copa Bullrich was an official football competition contested by clubs playing in the Second Division. The AFA has not included this competition into the list of national cups because only teams in Primera División participated in those competitions.)

=== Friendlies ===
- Trofeo Asociación Anglo-Argentina (1): 1912
- Torneo Internacional Nocturno Rioplatense (1): 1936
- Copa Confraternidad Argentino-Brasileña (1): 1939 (shared with River Plate)
- Copa Ministerio de Hacienda (1): 1941
- Torneo Cuadrangular de Lisboa (1): 1953
- Torneo Internacional de Chile (1): 1964
- Festa d'Elx Trophy (1): 1967
- Trofeo Montilla Moriles (1): 1967
- Trofeo Villa de Madrid (1): 1981
- Lunar New Year Cup (1): 1975 (Note: Organised by the Hong Kong Football Association since 1908)
- Torneo Internacional de Fútbol Miami (1): 1986
- Copa de las Instituciones (1): 1993
- Copa Presidente Carlos S. Menem (1): 1994

== See also ==
- List of world champion football clubs
