= Arsenio Erico =

Paraguayan footballer (1915–1977)

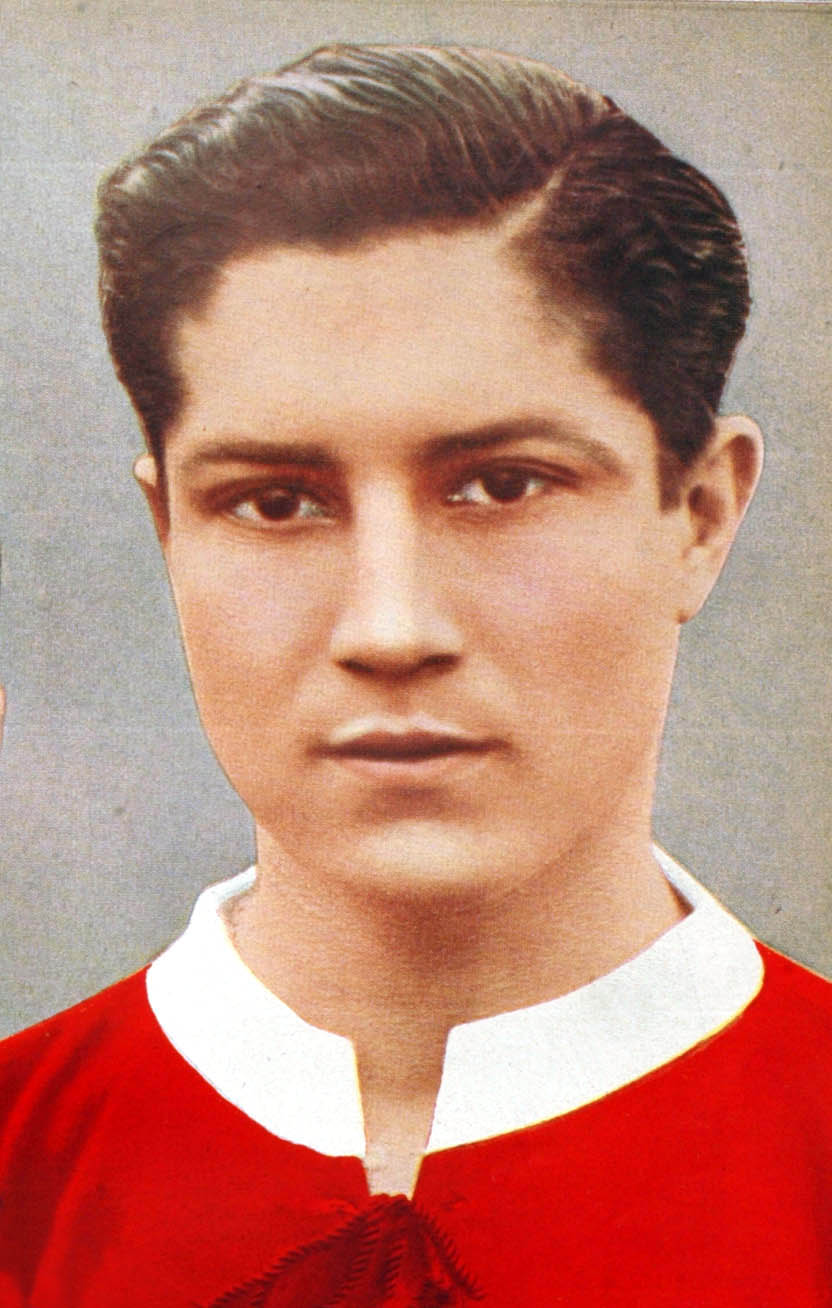
- Erico covered on El Gráfico in 1934

Personal information
- Full name: Arsenio Pastor Erico Martínez
- Date of birth: 30 March 1915
- Place of birth: Asunción, Paraguay
- Date of death: 23 July 1977 (aged 62)
- Place of death: Buenos Aires, Argentina
- Height: 5 ft 10 in (1.78 m)
- Position: Striker

Senior career*
Years	Team	Apps	(Gls)
1930–1933	Nacional (P)	14	(17)
1933–1946	Independiente	325	(295)
1942	Nacional (P)	1	(2)
1946–1947	Huracán	7	(0)
1947–1949	Nacional (P)	9	(5)
Total		356	(319)

International career
1933–1934	Paraguay	?	(1)
- * Club domestic league appearances and goals

Arsenio Pastor Erico Martínez (30 March 1915 – 23 July 1977) was a Paraguayan football striker. According to some researchers, Erico is ranked first among the all-time highest goalscorers in the Argentine Primera División with 293 goals. Nevertheless, in 2025 some historians rectified that statistic, placing Ángel Labruna first with 295 goals.

All the goals in Erico's career in Primera División were scored playing for Independiente. Erico is also considered the best Paraguayan footballer of all time and for some, including Alfredo Di Stéfano, is the best player in history. A striker noted for his technique, finishing and aerial ability, Erico was regarded one of the finest players of the 1930s and one of greatest players to have played in the Argentinean league.

Based on that work, published in 114 parts over more than two years, the statistics showed that Erico had 293 goals and Labruna 290. But as the research pointed out: "The 3-goal difference in Erico's favor was reduced to a minimum when some historians discovered that Labruna had scored 2 goals in the 1949 playoff matches for second place against Platense, which had been ignored by Ramírez". Therefore, the numbers became 293–292.

== Career ==
=== As a player ===
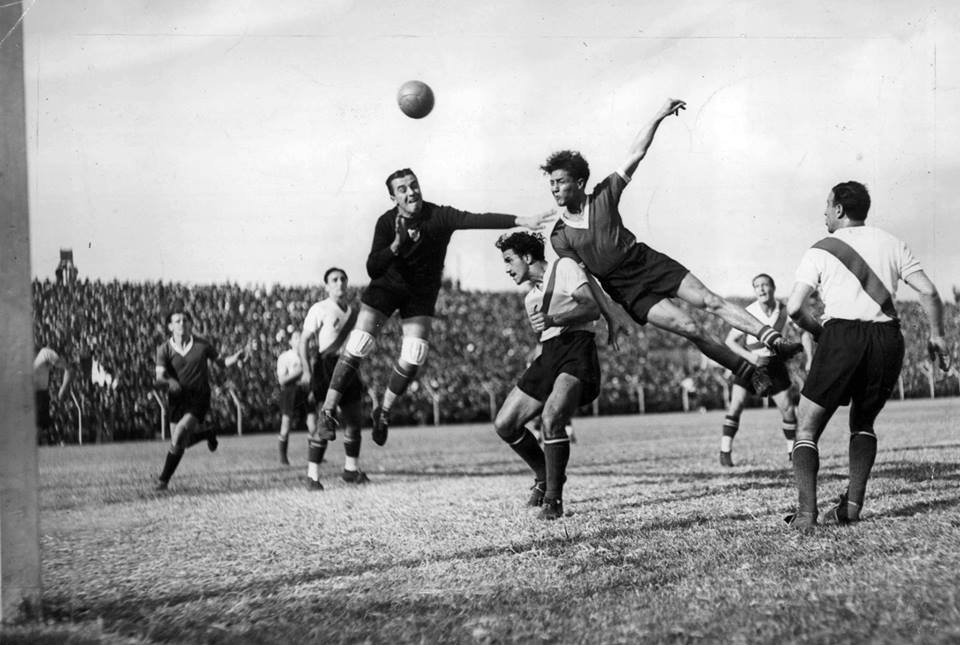
Erico heading the ball in a match against River Plate, c. 1939

Erico, born in Asunción, Paraguay, began his career with Club Nacional of Paraguay and made his debut in the club's first-team squad at the age of 15. During the early 1930s, Erico was part of the Paraguayan Red Cross football team that was on tour in Argentina in order to gather funds for the Chaco War. Because of his good performances during the friendly matches on the tour, Club Atlético Independiente of Argentina signed him. He made his debut for Independiente on 5 May 1936 and began to demonstrate why he had acquired the nickname 'red jumper'. Before the 1938 FIFA World Cup, Erico was offered an extravagant amount of money to play for the Argentina national football team but he rejected it, gaining the praise of the general Argentine public for remaining loyal to his country of origin. Soon after this, however, Erico caught an infection which led to a long period out on the sidelines. Then, in 1937, he broke his leg. After he recovered, however, he reminded everyone of his talent by taking Independiente to the league title in 1938 and 1939. Later, he joined Huracán where he only played 7 games in 1947 before retiring.

=== After retirement ===
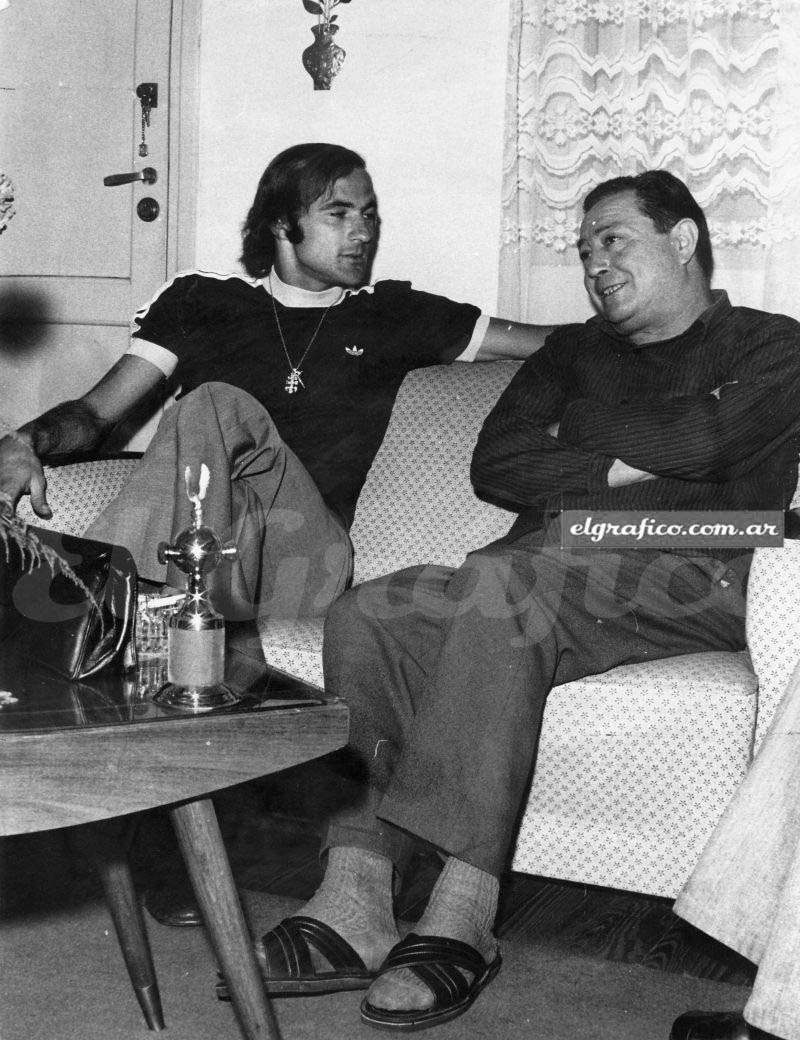
Erico (right) with then Argentine league topscorer Héctor Scotta in 1975

After retiring from football, Erico decided to live in Argentina, although he often visited his country of origin. He had a brief career as a coach, managing the club where he started his career as a footballer, Nacional and also had a brief stint in Club Sol de América where he led the team to a second-place finish in the 1957 Paraguayan Primera División. In 1960, he got married with Aurelia Blanco. They had no children.

In 1970 Erico was honored in Asunción, Paraguay during a friendly match between Argentina and Paraguay national sides in the Estadio Defensores del Chaco that was at its full capacity.

In 1977 his left leg had to be cut off, and he finally died of a heart attack on 23 July 1977. While the match between River and Independiente (played the day following his death at Tomas Adolfo Duco Palace) was being played, the crowd acclaimed Erico singing "Se siente, se siente, Erico está presente (We feel it, we feel it, Erico is with us)".

Erico was buried in the Cemetery of Morón in Greater Buenos Aires. Independiente paid the costs of burial expenses and funeral.

== Legacy ==
Erico was an inspiration to Argentine player Alfredo Di Stéfano, who considered him one of the greatest player ever. Other figures like Brazilian striker Leônidas da Silva and Paraguayan Delfín Benítez Cáceres also consider Erico as one of the best players in history. Argentine striker Francisco Varallo remembers Erico as a "phenomenon" that would excel in scoring headers due to his high jumps.

Club Nacional Stadium is named after him, and sections of the Defensores del Chaco stadium in Paraguay and the Libertadores de América stadium in Avellaneda also carry Arsenio Erico's name. He died on 23 July 1977.

== Career statistics ==
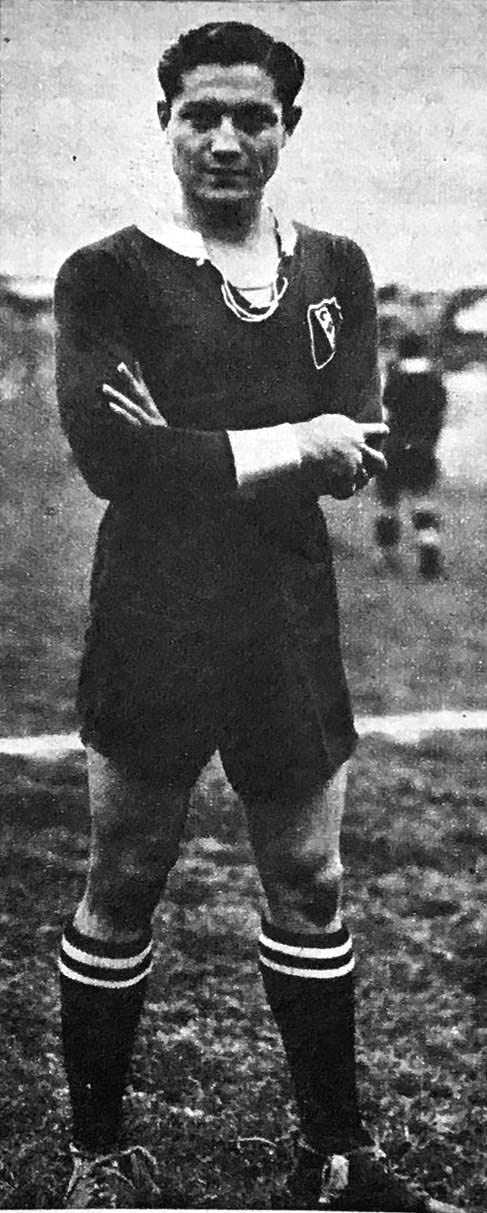
Erico with Independiente, the only club where he played in Argentina

Club	Season	League			National Cup		Super Cup		Total	
Club	Season	Division	Apps	Goals	Apps	Goals	Apps	Goals	Apps	Goals
Nacional	1931	Paraguayan Primera División	3	0	-	-	-	-	3	0
Nacional	1932	Paraguayan Primera División	5	6	-	-	-	-	5	6
Nacional	1933	Paraguayan Primera División	6	11	-	-	-	-	6	11
Independiente	Total		14	17	-	-	-	-	14	17
Independiente	1934	Argentine Primera División	21	12	2	-	-	-	23	12
Independiente	1935	Argentine Primera División	20	22	-	-	-	-	20	22
Independiente	1936	Argentine Primera División	26	21	-	-	-	-	26	21
Independiente	1937	Argentine Primera División	29	47	-	-	-	-	29	47
Independiente	1938	Argentine Primera División	31	43	-	-	1	2	32	45
Independiente	1939	Argentine Primera División	32	41	-	-	1	2	33	43
Independiente	1940	Argentine Primera División	31	29	-	-	-	-	31	29
Independiente	1941	Argentine Primera División	27	26	-	-	-	-	27	26
Independiente	1942	Argentine Primera División	3	0	-	-	-	-	3	0
Independiente	Total		220	241	2	-	2	4	224	245
Nacional	1942	Paraguayan Primera Division	1	2	-	-	-	-	1	2
Nacional	Total		1	2	-	-	-	-	1	2
Independiente	1943	Argentine Primera División	29	17	-	-	-	-	29	17
Independiente	1944	Argentine Primera División	27	12	-	-	-	-	27	12
Independiente	1945	Argentine Primera División	30	20	-	-	-	-	30	20
Independiente	1946	Argentine Primera División	19	5	-	-	-	-	19	5
Independiente	Total		105	54	-	-	-	-	105	54
Huracán	1947	Argentine Primera División	7	0	-	-	-	-	7	0
Huracán	Total		7	0	-	-	-	-	7	0
Nacional	1948	Paraguayan Primera División	2	1	-	-	-	-	2	1
Nacional	1949	Paraguayan Primera División	7	4	-	-	-	-	7	4
Nacional	Total		9	5	-	-	-	-	9	5
Career total			356	319	2	-	2	4	360	323

== Titles ==
=== Club ===
Independiente

- Primera División (2): 1938, 1939
- Copa Dr. Ibarguren (2): 1938, 1939
- Copa Adrián Escobar (1): 1939
- Copa Aldao (2): 1938, 1939

Nacional (Paraguay)

- Primera División (1): 1942

== All-time topscorer controversy ==
Until October 2025, there was a broad consensus that Erico was the all-time top scorer in the Primera División.

In October 2025, however, following a thorough investigation, historians from Center for the Research of Football History (CIHF) concluded that Ángel Labruna was the all-time top scorer, moving Erico to second place.

They supported their conclusion by explaining that previous statistics had been based on Pablo Ramírez's book, The History of Professionalism in Argentine football, published in 1977. According to the CIHF historians, Ramírez's work contained errors and omissions because he deliberately excluded tiebreaker matches and tournaments that he considered irrelevant, such as the Reclassification and Promotional tournaments. In addition, he did not cover the first 40 years of Argentine football (1891–1930) so the book covered only the professional era beginning in 1931.

In his book, Ramírez stated that Erico had scored 295 goals and Labruna 293. However, later research showed that Erico's two-goal advantage had narrowed when historians discovered that Labruna had scored two goals in the 1949 second-place playoff matches against Platense, matches that Ramírez had omitted. As a result, the 295–293 tally in Erico's favor was accepted for many years.

More recent research also found that a goal attributed by Ramírez to José Manuel Moreno had in fact been scored by Labruna. Most contemporary media reports available at the time credited Labruna, while Ramírez attributed it to Moreno, as had the newspaper La Nación. A photograph showing Labruna heading the ball into the net dispelled any remaining doubt, bringing both players level on 293 goals.

The latest CIHF review, which lasted more than six weeks and was published in October 2025, concluded that Labruna had scored 295 goals and Erico 293, making Labruna the all-time leading scorer in the Argentine Primera División.

== Bibliography ==
- Cajigal, R. (1970). Arsenio Erico (in Spanish). Vol. 14 of the Galería de paraguayos ilustres. Asunción: Editorial Don Bosco.
- Meza Vera, R. (1978). Arsenio Erico: El Paraguayo de Oro (in Spanish). Asunción: Imprenta Comuneros.
- Bogado, C.; Ramírez Santacruz, G. (2006). Arsenio Erico, el ángel que jugó para los diablos: historia del mejor futbolista de todos los tiempos (in Spanish). Asunción: Arandurã Editorial.
- Barraza, J. (2010). Erico Para Siempre (in Spanish). Asunción: Editorial El Lector. ISBN 979-7000051309.
