= 1938 Argentine Primera División =

47th season of top-tier football league in Argentina

Primera División
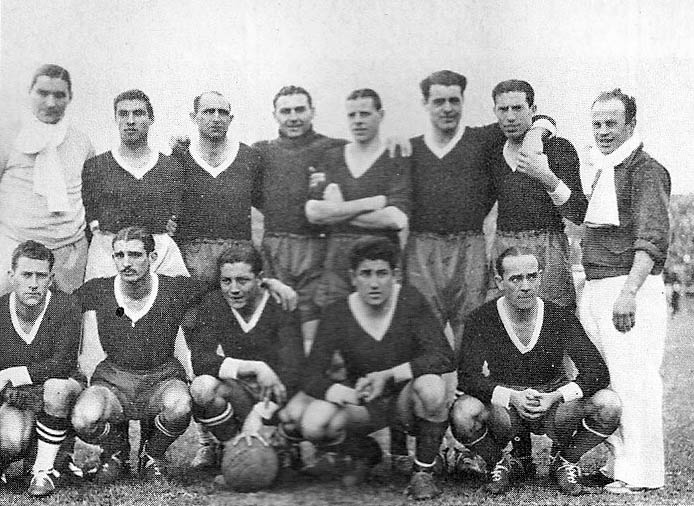
- Independiente, champions
- Season: 1938
- Champions: Independiente (3rd title)
- Promoted: Almagro
- Relegated: Almagro; Talleres (BA)
- 1938 Copa Aldao: Independiente
- Top goalscorer: (Paraguay) Arsenio Erico (Independiente) (43 goals)

The 1938 Argentine Primera División was the 47th season of top-flight football in Argentina. The season began on April 3 and ended on December 18.

There were 17 teams in the tournament, and Independiente won the championship.

== League standings ==
Pos	Team	Pld	W	D	L	GF	GA	GD	Pts
1	Independiente	32	25	3	4	115	37	+78	53
2	River Plate	32	23	5	4	105	49	+56	51
3	San Lorenzo	32	18	7	7	87	67	+20	43
4	Racing	32	16	7	9	102	63	+39	39
5	Boca Juniors	32	13	9	10	66	53	+13	35
5	Gimnasia y Esgrima (LP)	32	15	5	12	83	69	+14	35
5	Estudiantes (LP)	32	16	3	13	70	77	−7	35
8	Huracán	32	14	3	15	85	89	−4	31
9	Atlanta	32	12	4	16	61	70	−9	28
10	Vélez Sarsfield	32	11	5	16	78	85	−7	27
11	Platense	32	10	6	16	84	100	−16	26
11	Ferro Carril Oeste	32	9	8	15	68	89	−21	26
11	Tigre	32	11	4	17	71	102	−31	26
14	Lanús	32	8	9	15	75	95	−20	25
14	Chacarita Juniors	32	10	5	17	66	92	−26	25
16	Almagro	32	8	5	19	63	94	−31	21
17	Talleres (RE)	32	6	6	20	55	103	−48	18

Source: rsssf.com
