= 1939 Argentine Primera División =

48th season of top-tier football league in Argentina

Primera División
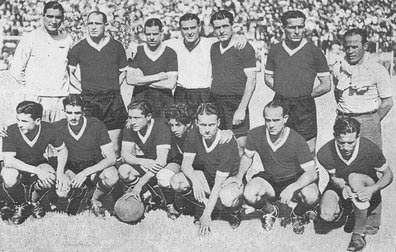
- Independiente, champions
- Season: 1939
- Champions: Independiente (4th title)
- Promoted: Argentino (Q); Newell's Old Boys; Rosario Central
- Relegated: Argentino (Q)
- 1939 Copa Aldao: Independiente
- Top goalscorer: (Paraguay) Arsenio Erico (Independiente) (40 goals)

The 1939 Argentine Primera División was the 48th season of top-flight football in Argentina. The season began on March 19 and ended on December 2. There were 18 teams in the tournament that was won by Independiente achieving its 4th league title.

A total of three teams joined the division: Argentino de Quilmes (promoted last year) and two clubs from regional Liga Rosarina, Rosario Central and Newell's Old Boys.

Paraguayan forward Arsenio Erico became topscorer for the 3rd consecutive time, with 40 goals.

== League standings ==
Pos	Team	Pld	W	D	L	GF	GA	GD	Pts
1	Independiente	34	27	2	5	103	37	+66	56
2	River Plate	34	23	4	7	100	43	+57	50
3	Huracán	34	23	4	7	97	56	+41	50
4	Newell's Old Boys	34	17	9	8	77	44	+33	43
5	San Lorenzo	34	19	4	11	85	55	+30	42
6	Boca Juniors	34	17	6	11	64	40	+24	40
7	Racing	34	16	6	12	75	54	+21	38
8	Chacarita Juniors	34	14	6	14	61	54	+7	34
8	Estudiantes (LP)	34	14	6	14	71	65	+6	34
8	Vélez Sarsfield	34	14	6	14	56	66	−10	34
11	Rosario Central	34	14	5	15	59	68	−9	33
12	Lanús	34	14	2	18	91	85	+6	30
12	Tigre	34	13	4	17	56	79	−23	30
14	Platense	34	11	7	16	65	72	−7	29
15	Gimnasia y Esgrima (LP)	34	10	8	16	50	82	−32	28
16	Atlanta	34	8	6	20	56	93	−37	22
17	Ferro Carril Oeste	34	4	7	23	52	112	−60	15
18	Argentino de Quilmes	34	0	4	30	35	148	−113	4
