= 1973 Copa Libertadores finals =

Association football match series

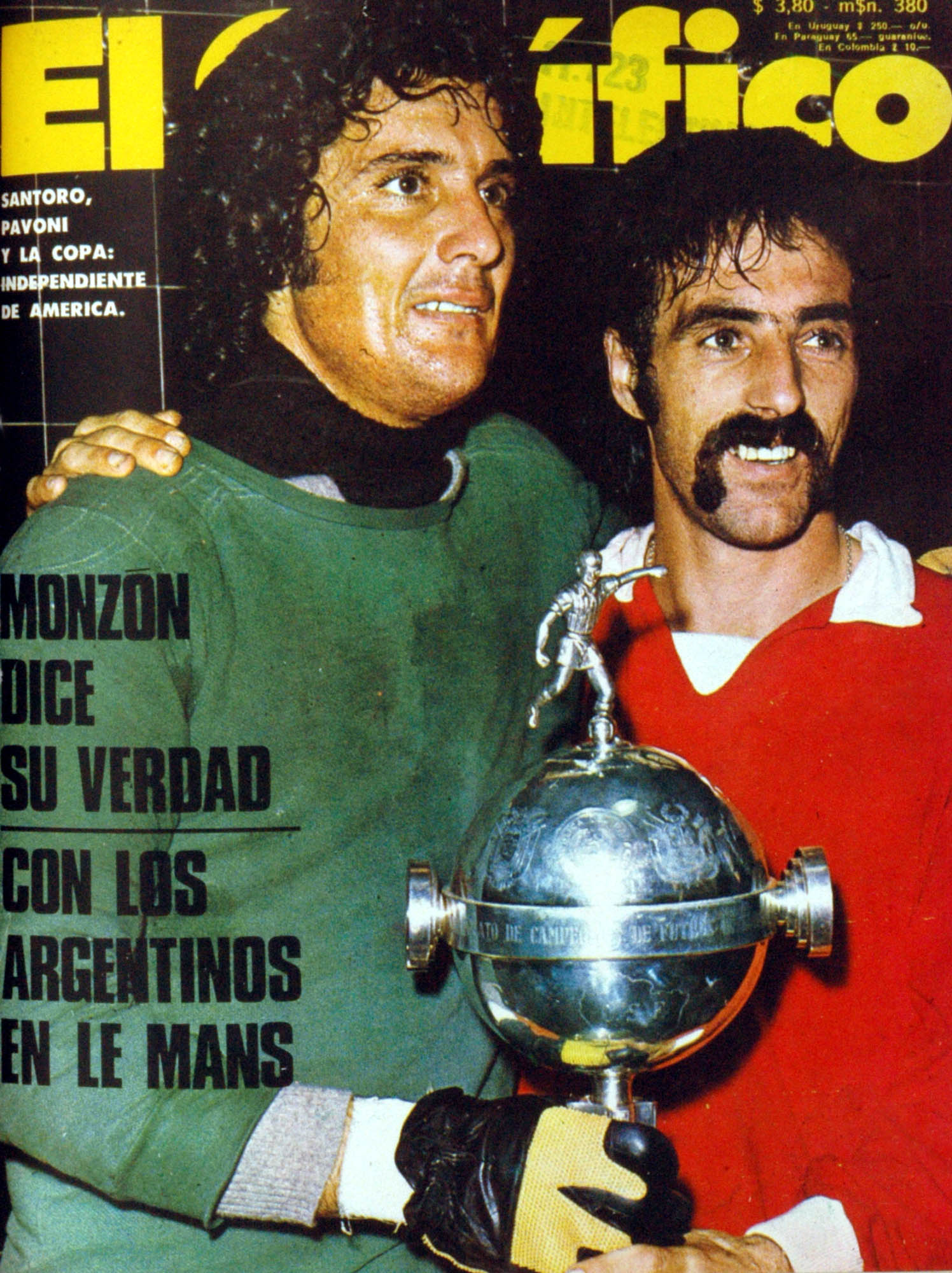
- Independiente, champions
- Event: 1973 Copa Libertadores de América
Independiente	Colo-Colo
(Argentina)	(Chile)
- 2–2 on points Independiente won after a play-off

First leg
Independiente	Colo-Colo
1	1
- Date: 22 May 1973
- Venue: Estadio Doble Visera, Avellaneda
- Referee: Milton Lorenzo (Uruguay)

Second leg
Colo-Colo	Independiente
0	0
- Date: 29 May 1973
- Venue: Estadio Nacional de Chile, Santiago
- Referee: Romualdo Arpi Filho (Brazil)

Play-off
Colo-Colo	Independiente
1	2
- After extra time
- Date: 6 June 1973
- Venue: Estadio Centenario, Montevideo
- Referee: José Romei (Paraguay)
- Attendance: 50,000

The 1973 Copa Libertadores finals was the final two-legged tie to determine the 1973 Copa Libertadores champion. It was contested by Argentine club Independiente and Chilean club Colo-Colo. The first leg of the tie was played on 22 May at Avellaneda' home field, with the second leg played on 29 May at Santiago de Chile'.

Independiente won the series after winning a tie-breaking playoff 2–1 at Montevideo's Estadio Centenario, achieving their fourth Libertadores trophy. The final was controversial, with Chilean media and some Colo Colo players complaining about the referees, accusing them to having been bribed to favour Independiente.

== Qualified teams ==
Team	Previous finals app.
(Argentina) Independiente	**1964**, **1965**, **1972**
(Chile) Colo-Colo	None

- **Bold** indicates winning years

== Venues ==
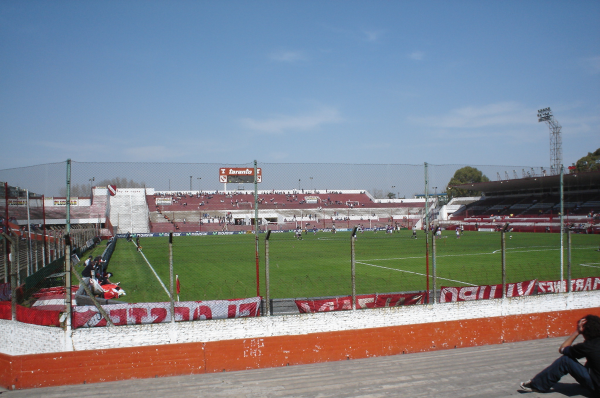
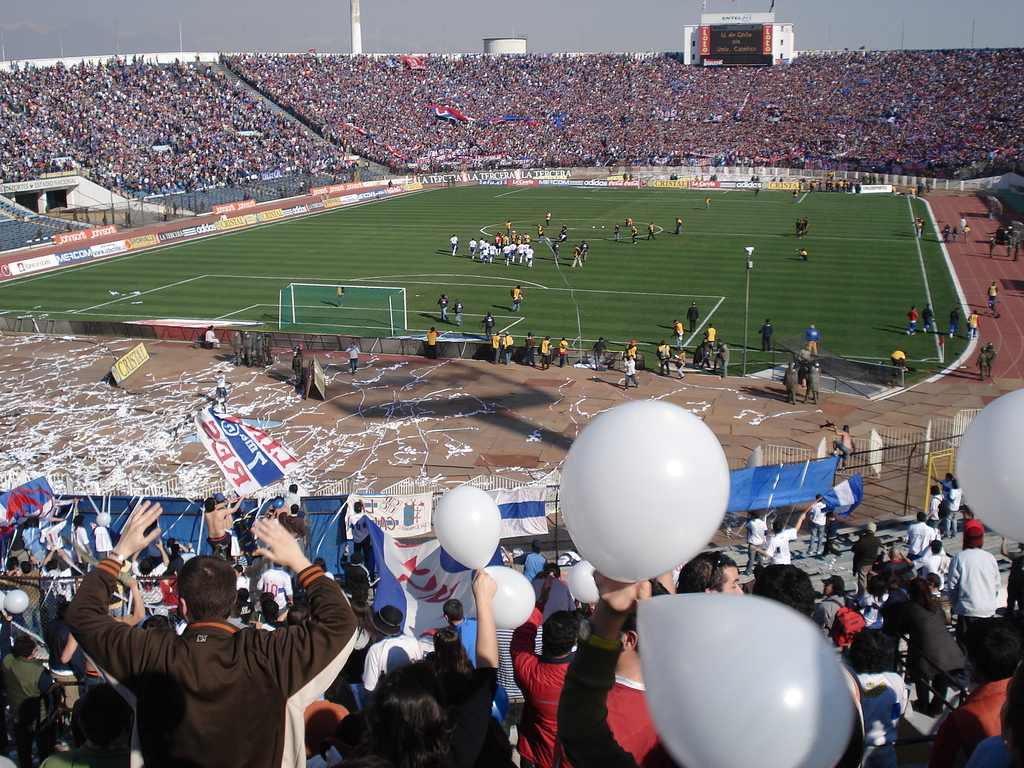
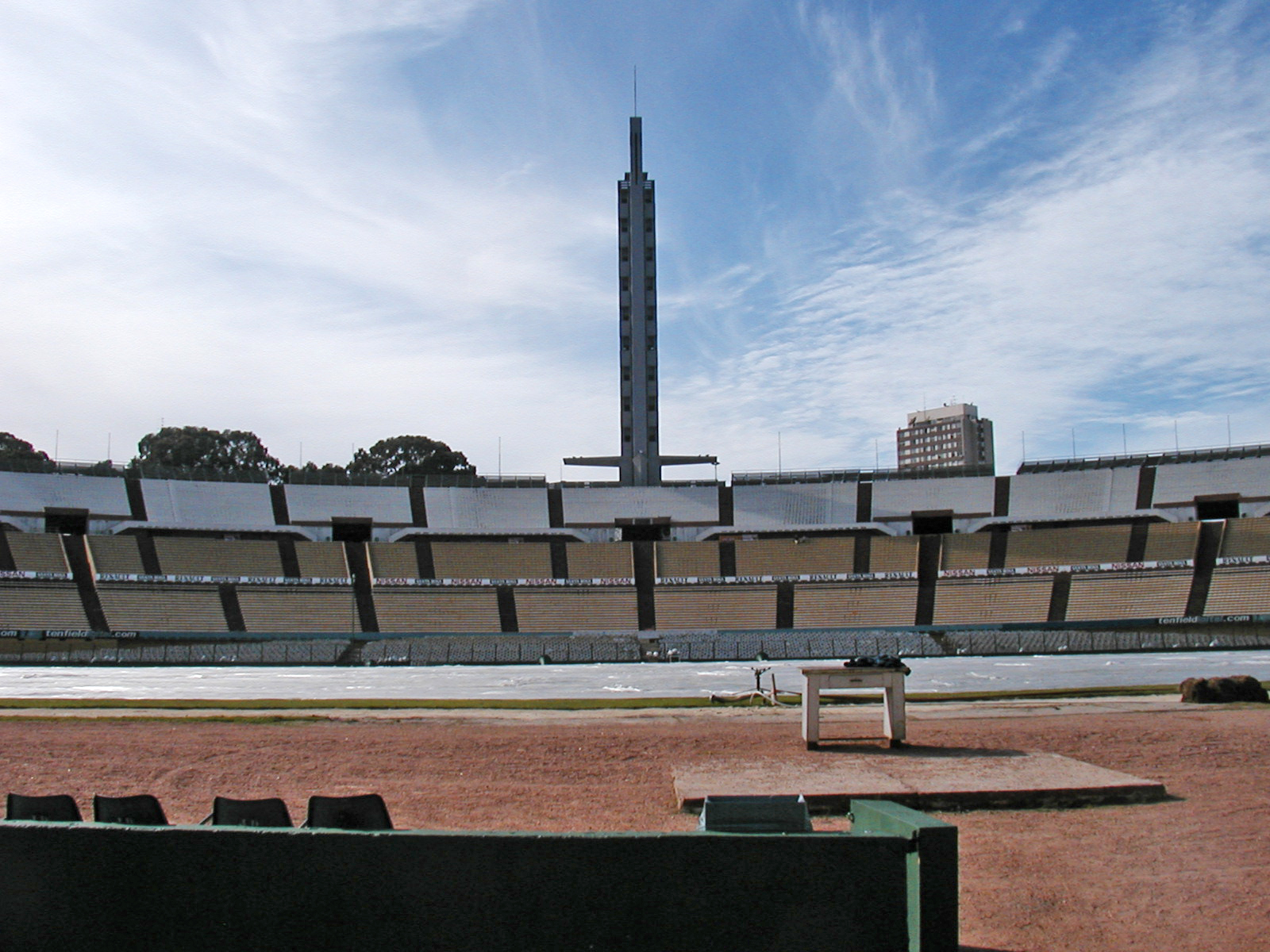
"La Doble Visera" (Avellaneda), Estadio Nacional (Santiago) and Estadio Centenario (Montevideo) hosted the two legs and playoff match respectively

== Match details ==
=== First leg ===
1973 Copa Libertadores finals
22 May 1973
First leg

Independiente (Argentina)	1–1	(Chile) Colo-Colo
Mendoza 75'		Sá 71' (o.g.)

Independiente Stadium, Avellaneda
Attendance: 40,000
Referee: Milton Lorenzo (Uruguay)

**Independiente**	**Colo-Colo**

GK	(Argentina) Miguel Ángel Santoro
DF	(Argentina) Eduardo Commisso
DF	(Argentina) Francisco Sá (C)
DF	(Argentina) Luis Garisto
DF	(Uruguay) Ricardo Pavoni
MF	(Argentina) Alejandro Semenewicz
MF	(Argentina) Miguel Ángel Raimondo
MF	(Argentina) Héctor Martínez
FW	(Argentina) Agustín Balbuena	(substituted off) a'
FW	(Argentina) Miguel Ángel Giachello	(substituted off) b'
FW	(Argentina) Mario Mendoza
Substitutes:
FW	(Argentina) Daniel Bertoni	(substituted on) a'
FW	(Argentina) Eduardo Maglioni	(substituted on) b'
Manager:
(Argentina) Humberto Maschio

GK	(Chile) Adolfo Nef
DF	(Chile) Mario Galindo (c)
DF	(Chile) Leonel Herrera
DF	(Chile) Rafael González
DF	(Chile) Alejandro Silva
MF	(Chile) Guillermo Páez
MF	(Chile) Francisco Valdés
MF	(Chile) Fernando Osorio	(substituted off) a'
FW	(Chile) Sergio Messen
FW	(Chile) Sergio Ahumada
FW	(Chile) Leonardo Véliz	(substituted off) b'
Substitutes:
FW	(Chile) Carlos Caszely	(substituted on) a'
FW	(Chile) Alfonso Lara	(substituted on) b'
Manager:
(Chile) Luis Álamos

=== Second leg ===
29 May 1973
Second leg

Colo-Colo (Chile)	0–0	(Argentina) Independiente

Estadio Nacional, Santiago
Attendance: 72,500
Referee: Romualdo Arppi (Brazil)

**Colo-Colo**	**Independiente**

GK	(Chile) Adolfo Nef
DF	(Chile) Mario Galindo (c)
DF	(Chile) Leonel Herrera
DF	(Chile) Rafael González
DF	(Chile) Alejandro Silva
MF	(Chile) Guillermo Páez
MF	(Chile) Francisco Valdés
MF	(Chile) Fernando Osorio
FW	(Chile) Carlos Caszely
FW	(Chile) Sergio Messen
FW	(Chile) Leonardo Véliz
Substitutes:
Manager:
(Chile) Luis Álamos

GK	(Argentina) Miguel Ángel Santoro
DF	(Argentina) Eduardo Commisso
DF	(Argentina) Francisco Sá (C)
DF	(Argentina) Miguel Ángel López
DF	(Uruguay) Ricardo Pavoni
MF	(Argentina) Alejandro Semenewicz
MF	(Argentina) Miguel Ángel Raimondo
MF	(Argentina) Héctor Martínez
FW	(Argentina) Agustín Balbuena	(substituted off) a'
FW	(Argentina) Miguel Ángel Giachello	(substituted off) b'
FW	(Argentina) Mario Mendoza
Substitutes:
FW	(Argentina) Daniel Bertoni	(substituted on) a'
FW	(Argentina) Eduardo Maglioni	(substituted on) b'
Manager:
(Argentina) Humberto Maschio

=== Playoff ===
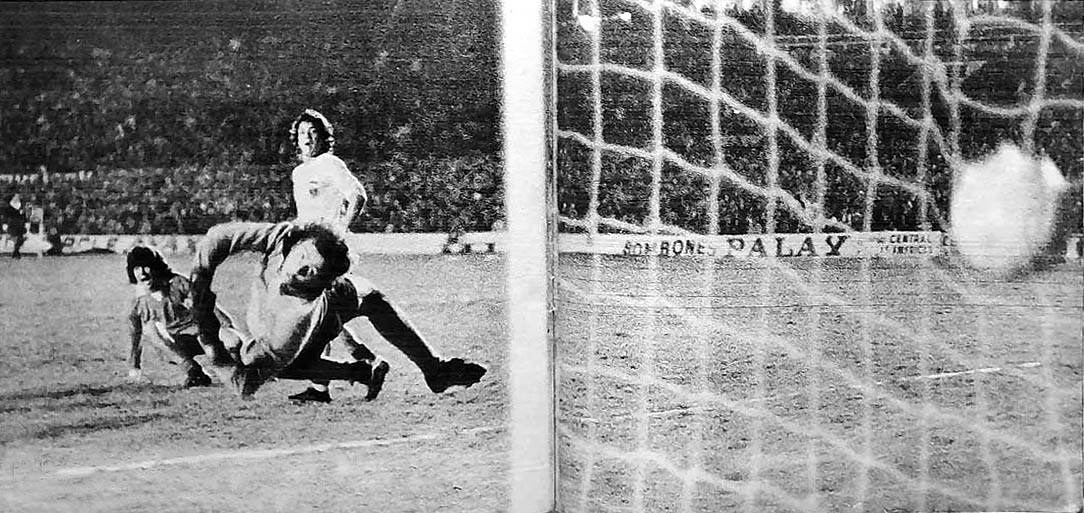
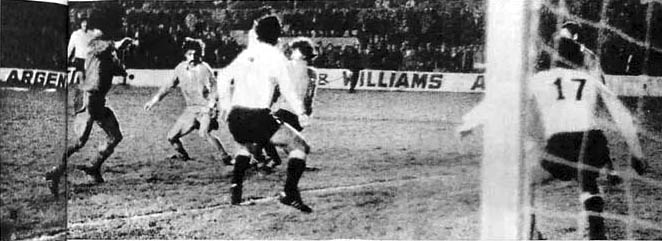
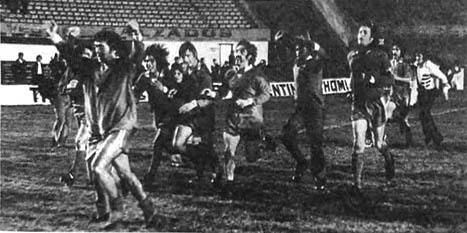
Some moments of the playoff, including the first goal of Independiente, scored by Mario Mendoza (left), and the lap of honour (right)
6 June 1973
Playoff

Independiente (Argentina)	2–1 (a.e.t.)	(Chile) Colo-Colo
Mendoza 25'; Giachello 107'		Caszely 39'

Estadio Centenario, Montevideo
Attendance: 50,000
Referee: José Romei (Paraguay)

**Independiente**	**Colo-Colo**

GK		(Argentina) Miguel Ángel Santoro
DF		(Argentina) Eduardo Commisso
DF		(Argentina) Francisco Sá (C)
DF		(Argentina) Miguel Ángel López
DF		(Uruguay) Ricardo Pavoni
MF		(Argentina) Alejandro Semenewicz
MF		(Argentina) Miguel Ángel Raimondo
MF		(Argentina) Rubén Galván
FW		(Argentina) Daniel Bertoni
FW		(Argentina) Eduardo Maglioni	(substituted off) a'
FW		(Argentina) Mario Mendoza	(substituted off) b'
Substitutes:
MF	**22**	(Argentina) Ricardo Bochini	(substituted on) a'
FW		(Argentina) Miguel Ángel Giachello	(substituted on) b'
Manager:
(Argentina) Humberto Maschio

GK	(Chile) Adolfo Nef
DF	(Chile) Mario Galindo (c)
DF	(Chile) Leonel Herrera
DF	(Chile) Rafael González
DF	(Chile) Alejandro Silva	(substituted off) a'
MF	(Chile) Guillermo Páez
MF	(Chile) Francisco Valdés
MF	(Chile) Sergio Messen
FW	(Chile) Carlos Caszely
FW	(Chile) Sergio Ahumada
FW	(Chile) Leonardo Véliz	(substituted off) b'
Substitutes:
MF	(Chile) Gerardo Castañeda	(substituted on) a'
MF	(Chile) Alfonso Lara	(substituted on) b'
Manager:
(Chile) Luis Álamos
