= 1973 Copa Interamericana =

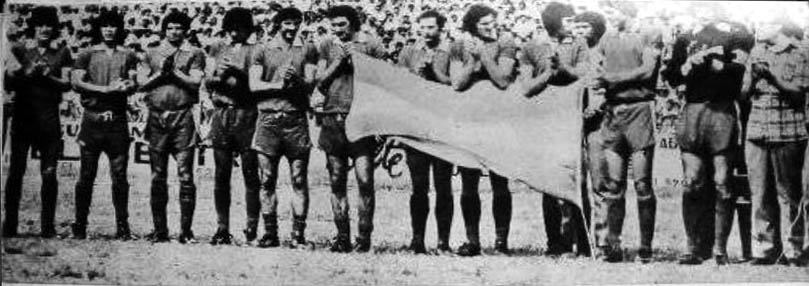
- Independiente, winners
- Event: Copa Interamericana
Olimpia	Independiente
(Honduras)	(Argentina)
1	4
- (on aggregate)

First leg
Olimpia	Independiente
1	2
- Date: June 17, 1973
- Venue: Francisco Morazán, San Pedro Sula
- Referee: Jorge Mirón (Guatemala)

Second leg
Independiente	Olimpia
2	0
- Date: June 20, 1973
- Venue: Tiburcio Carías, Tegucigalpa
- Referee: Luis Rojas (Costa Rica)

The 1973 Copa Interamericana was the 3rd. edition of the Copa Interamericana. The final was contested by Argentine Club Atlético Independiente (champion of 1972 Copa Libertadores) and Hondurean side Olimpia (winner of 1972 CONCACAF Champions' Cup). The final was played under a two-leg format in June, 1973. Both matches were held in Honduras.

In the first leg, hosted at Estadio General Francisco Morazán in San Pedro Sula, Independiente beat Olimpia 2–1. The second leg, hosted at Estadio Tiburcio Carías Andino in Tegucigalpa, was also won by the Argentine team by 2–0. With an aggregate score of 4–1, Independiente won their first Interamericana trophy.

== Qualified teams ==
Team	Qualification	Previous app.
(Argentina) Independiente	1972 Copa Libertadores winner	None
(Honduras) Olimpia	1972 CONCACAF Champions' Cup winner	None

== Venues ==
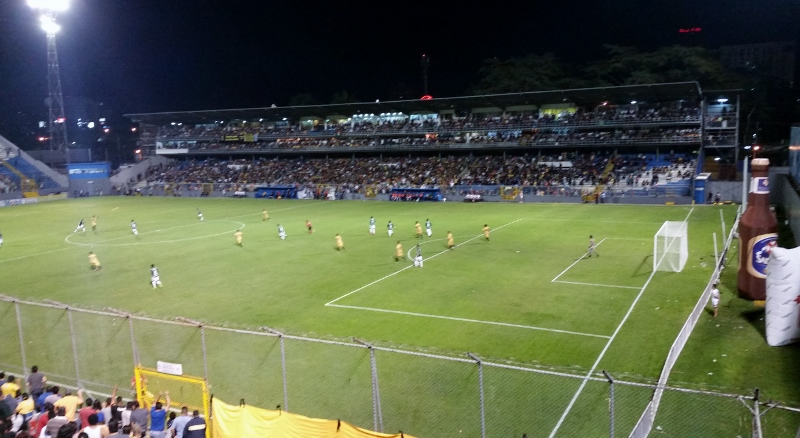
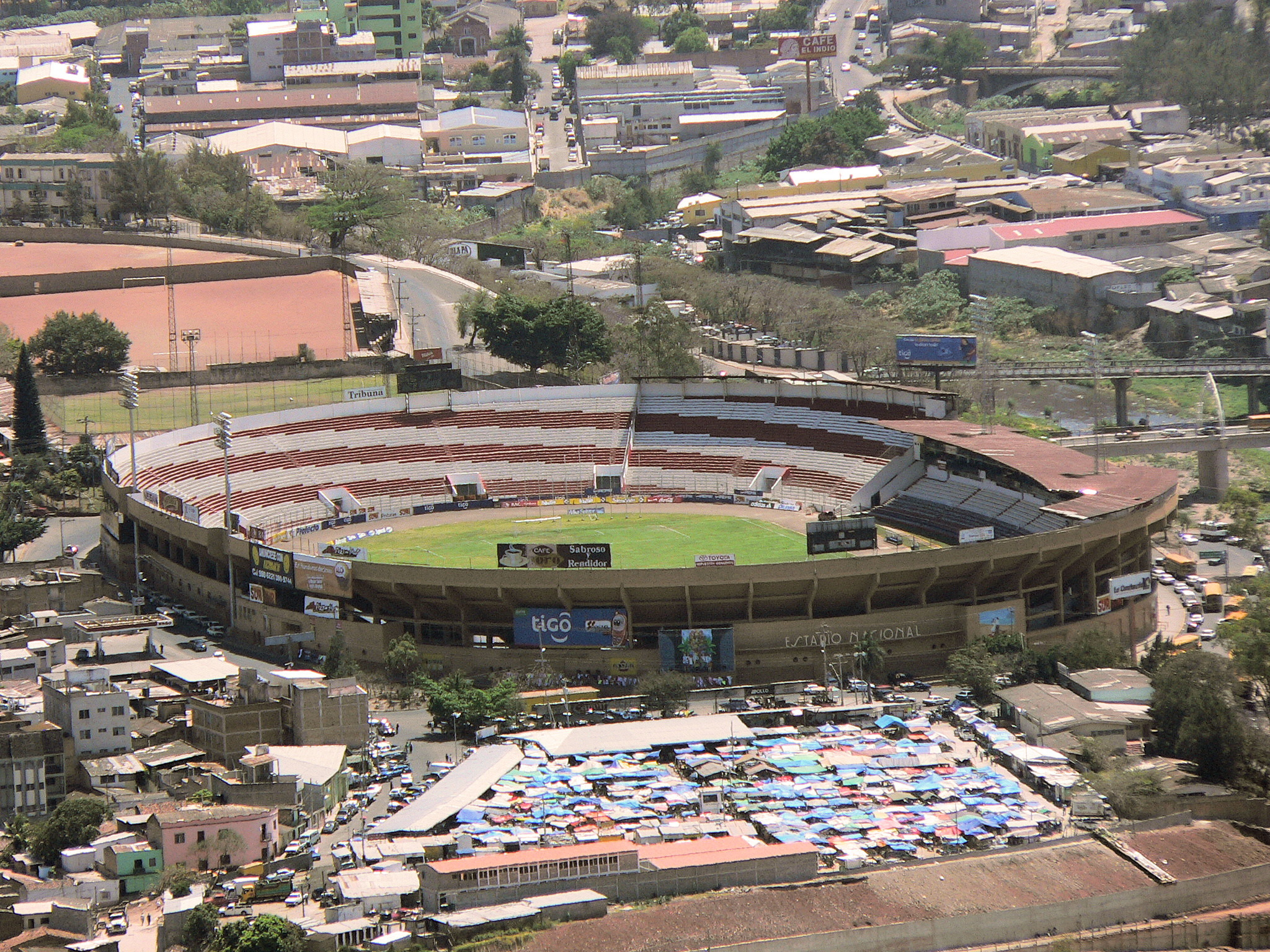
Francisco Morazán (left) and Tiburcio Carías Andino, venues of the series

== Match details ==
=== First leg ===
1973 Copa Interamericana
June 17, 1973
First leg

Olimpia (Honduras)	1–2	(Argentina) Independiente
Brand 53'	Report	Semenewicz 29'; Maglioni 55'

Francisco Morazán, San Pedro Sula
Referee: Jorge Mirón (Guatemala)

Olimpia	Independiente

GK	(Honduras) Samuel Sentini
DF	(Honduras) Selvin Cárcamo
DF	(Honduras) Miguel Ángel Matamoros
DF	(Honduras) Oscar García
DF	(Honduras) Juan Ventura López
MF	(Honduras) Marco Mendoza
MF	(Honduras) Ángel Paz
MF	(Honduras) Rigoberto Gómez
FW	(Honduras) Reinaldo Mejía	Substituted off
FW	(Honduras) René Suazo
FW	(Honduras) Jorge Brand
Substitutes:
FW	(Honduras) Dagoberto Espinal	Substituted on
Manager:
(Honduras) Juan Andino

GK	(Argentina) Miguel Ángel Santoro
DF	(Argentina) Eduardo Commisso
DF	(Argentina) Miguel Ángel Raimondo
DF	(Argentina) Miguel Ángel López
DF	(Uruguay) Ricardo Pavoni
MF	(Argentina) Alejandro Semenewicz
MF	(Argentina) Francisco Sá
MF	(Argentina) Rubén Galván	(substituted off) a'
FW	(Argentina) Eduardo Maglioni	(substituted off) b'
FW	(Argentina) Agustín Balbuena
FW	(Argentina) Mario Mendoza
Substitutes:
MF	(Argentina) Ricardo Bochini	(substituted on) a'
MF	(Argentina) Miguel Ángel Giachello	(substituted on) b'
Manager:
(Argentina) Humberto Maschio

=== Second leg ===
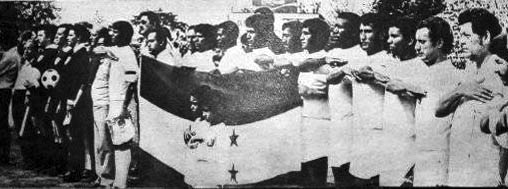
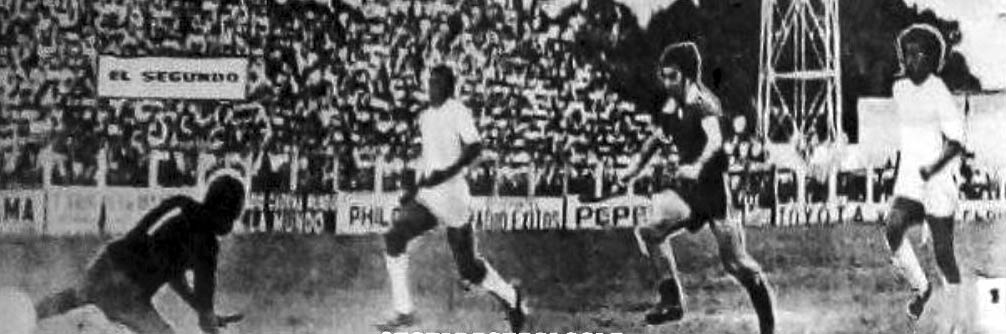
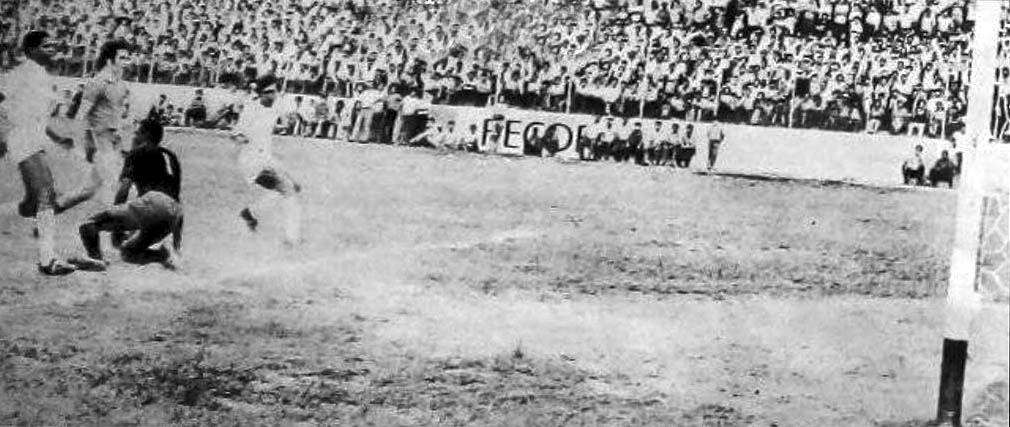
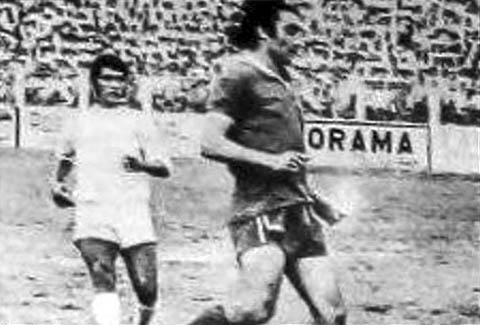
Some moments of the 2nd. match held in Tegucigalpa
June 20, 1973
Second leg

Olimpia (Honduras)	0–2	(Argentina) Independiente
	Report	Maglioni 42'; Balbuena 85'

Tiburcio Carías, Tegucigalpa
Referee: Luis Rojas (Costa Rica)

Olimpia	Independiente

GK	(Honduras) Samuel Sentini
DF	(Honduras) Selvin Cárcamo
DF	(Honduras) Miguel A. Matamoros
DF	(Honduras) Oscar García
DF	(Honduras) Juan Ventura López
MF	(Honduras) Marco Mendoza
MF	(Honduras) Domingo Ferrera	(substituted off) a'
MF	(Honduras) Rigoberto Gómez
FW	(Honduras) René Suazo	(substituted off) b'
FW	(Honduras) Dagoberto Espinal
FW	(Honduras) Jorge Brand
Substitutes:
MF	(Honduras) Ángel Paz	(substituted on) a'
FW	(Honduras) Reynaldo Mejía	(substituted on) b'
Manager:
(Honduras) Juan Andino

GK	(Argentina) Miguel Ángel Santoro
DF	(Argentina) Eduardo Commisso
DF	(Argentina) Miguel Ángel Raimondo
DF	(Argentina) Miguel Ángel López	Substituted off
DF	(Uruguay) Ricardo Pavoni
MF	(Argentina) Alejandro Semenewicz
MF	(Argentina) Francisco Sá
MF	(Argentina) Héctor Martínez
FW	(Argentina) Eduardo Maglioni
FW	(Argentina) Agustín Balbuena
FW	(Argentina) Mario Mendoza
Substitutes:
DF	(Uruguay) Luis Garisto	Substituted on
Manager:
(Argentina) Humberto Maschio
