= 1972 Intercontinental Cup =

- Dutch program
- Event: Intercontinental Cup
Independiente	Ajax
(Argentina)	(Netherlands)
1	4
- on aggregate

First leg
Independiente	Ajax
1	1
- Date: 6 September 1972
- Venue: Independiente Stadium, Avellaneda
- Referee: Tofiq Bahramov (Soviet Union)
- Attendance: 45,000

Second leg
Ajax	Independiente
3	0
- Date: 28 September 1972
- Venue: Olympic Stadium, Amsterdam
- Referee: José Romei (Paraguay)
- Attendance: 46,511

The 1972 Intercontinental Cup was an association football tie held over two legs in September 1972 between the winners of the 1971–72 European Cup, Ajax, and the winners of the 1972 Copa Libertadores, Independiente.

The first leg was held on 6 September 1972 at Independiente Stadium (La Doble Visera), home of Independiente, and ended in a 1–1 draw, with goals from Johan Cruyff and Francisco Sá. The return leg was held on 28 September 1972 at the Olympic Stadium, which was won by Ajax 3–0. Therefore the Dutch side won their first Intercontinental Cup trophy.

== Qualified teams ==
Team	Qualification	Previous finals app.
(Netherlands) Ajax	1971–72 European Cup champion	None
(Argentina) Independiente	1972 Copa Libertadores champion	1964, 1965

Bold indicates winning years

== Venues ==
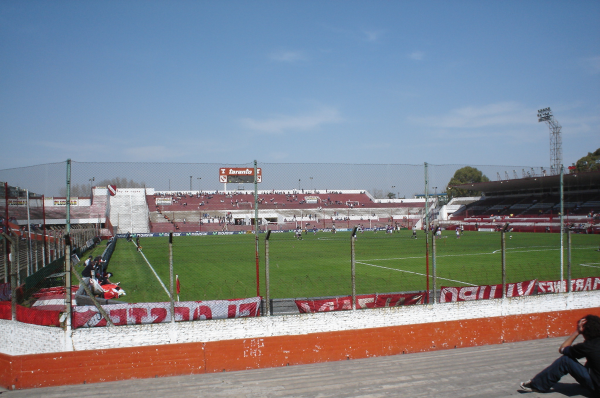
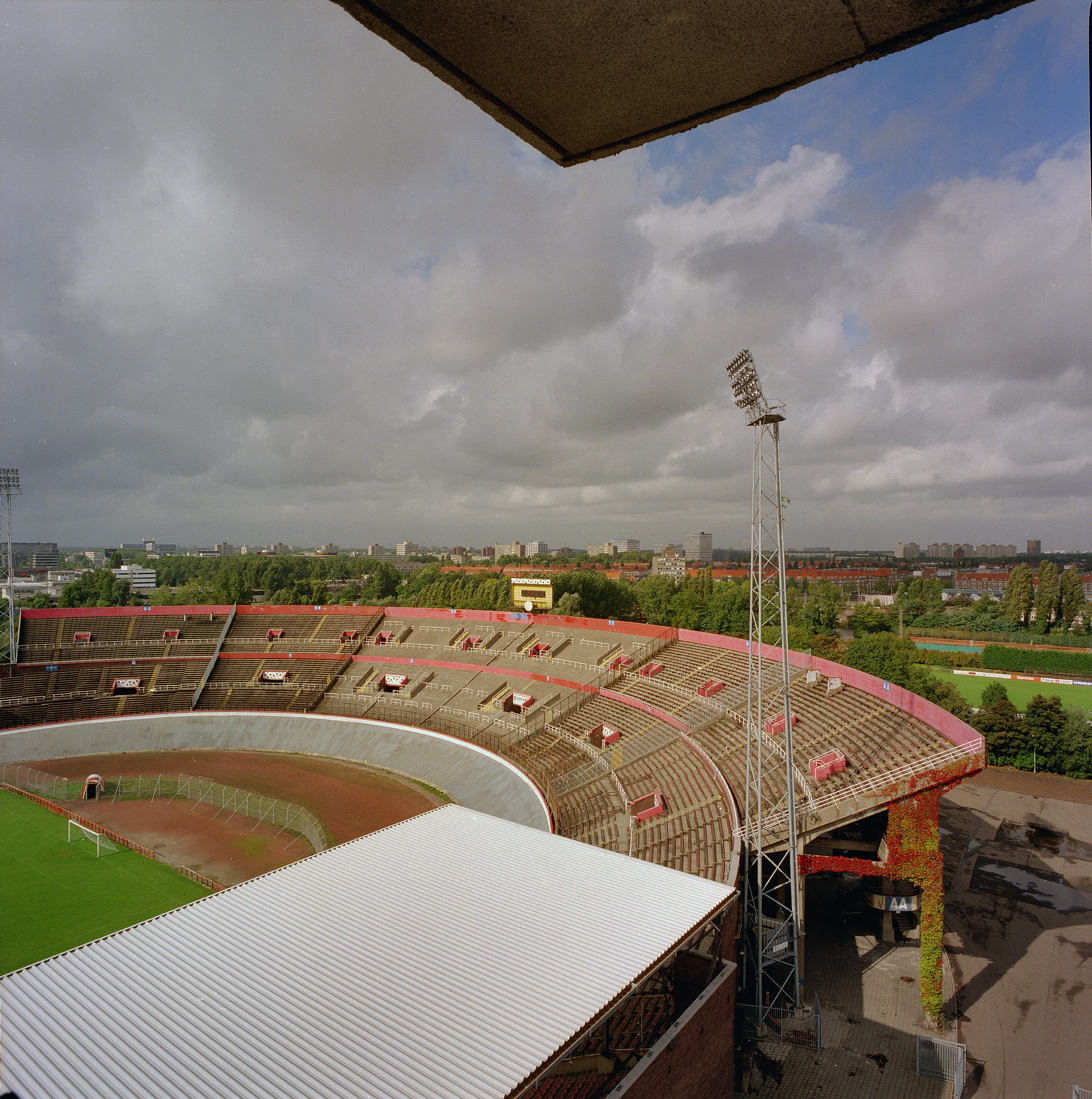
Independiente Stadium in Avellaneda (left) and Olympisch Stadion in Amsterdam, venues for the series

== Overview ==
The match was notable for being the first and only time Johan Cruyff played in Argentina, as he would not join the trip with the Netherlands national team to the 1978 FIFA World Cup where the Dutch team reached the final. Ajax arrived in Argentina bringing their own cook and food. Some Dutch supporters had previously arrived not only to watch the match but on a tourist trip to known Buenos Aires sites.

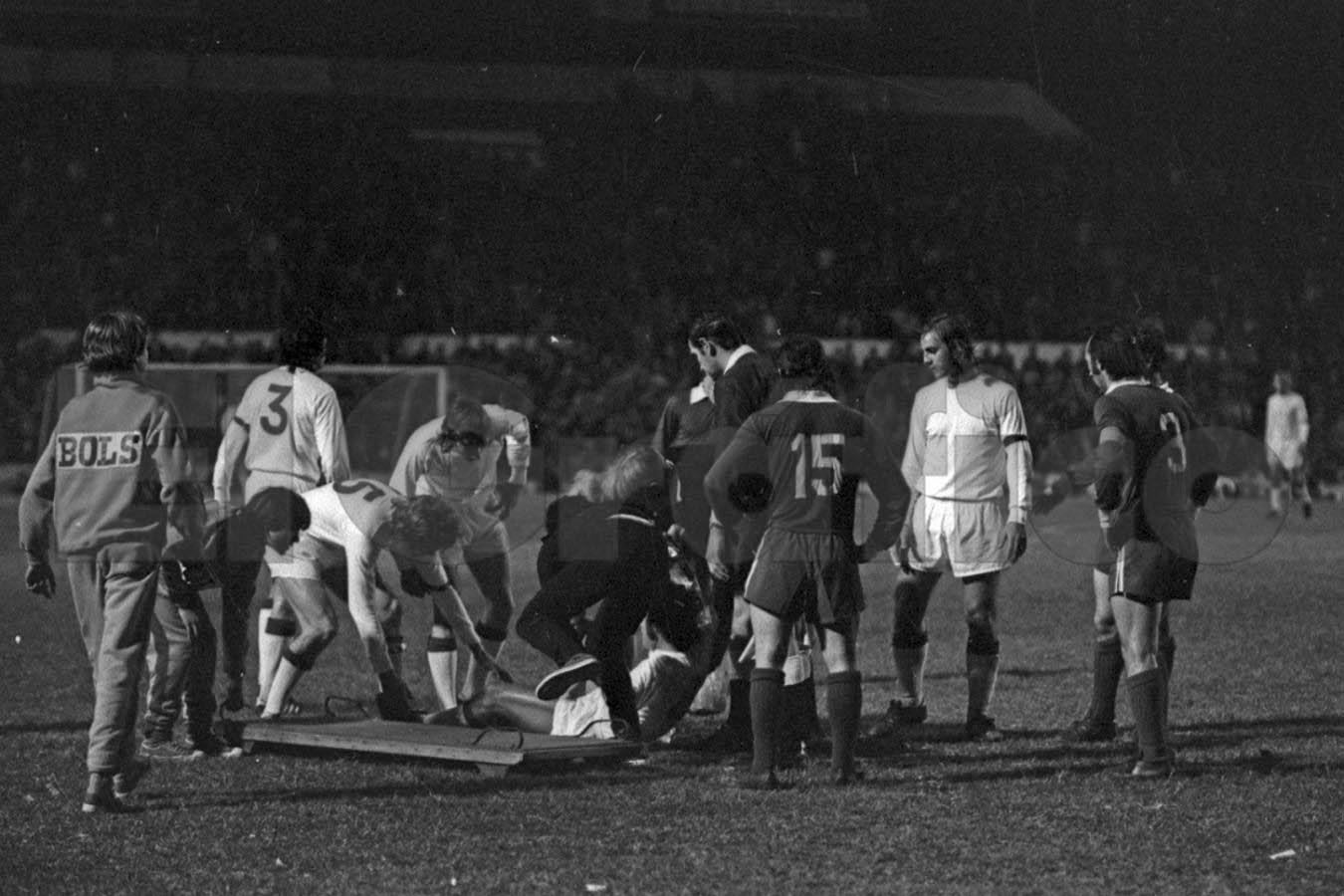
Sjaak Swart, injured, is taken out the field.

The early goal by Cruyff (who might have fouled Independiente defender Miguel Ángel López and or might have been fouled by Miguel Ángel López before scoring) dictated the direction of the match. Since that, Independiente's style of play turned towards toughness to stop Ajax players. As a result, Cruyff had to leave the field after a hard tackle by defender Dante Mírcoli. At the end of the first half, the Ajax players were so angry at Independiente players' violence that they refused to take to the field for the second half. Their coach Ștefan Kovács had to implore them to play on.

After the match, the Ajax players complained about the violence shown by their rivals. Forward Sjaak Swart defined rival defender Ricardo Pavoni as "a gangster", also stating "he believes he is Carlos Monzón" to describe the Uruguayan's stiffness. In the same line, Ajax manager Kovacs added his testimony saying: "This was not football but war.... In Amsterdam, Independiente will have serious troubles. One of them, our magnificent pitch so they are not used to play on those surfaces. This pitch (Independiente Stadium) is not suitable to play football"

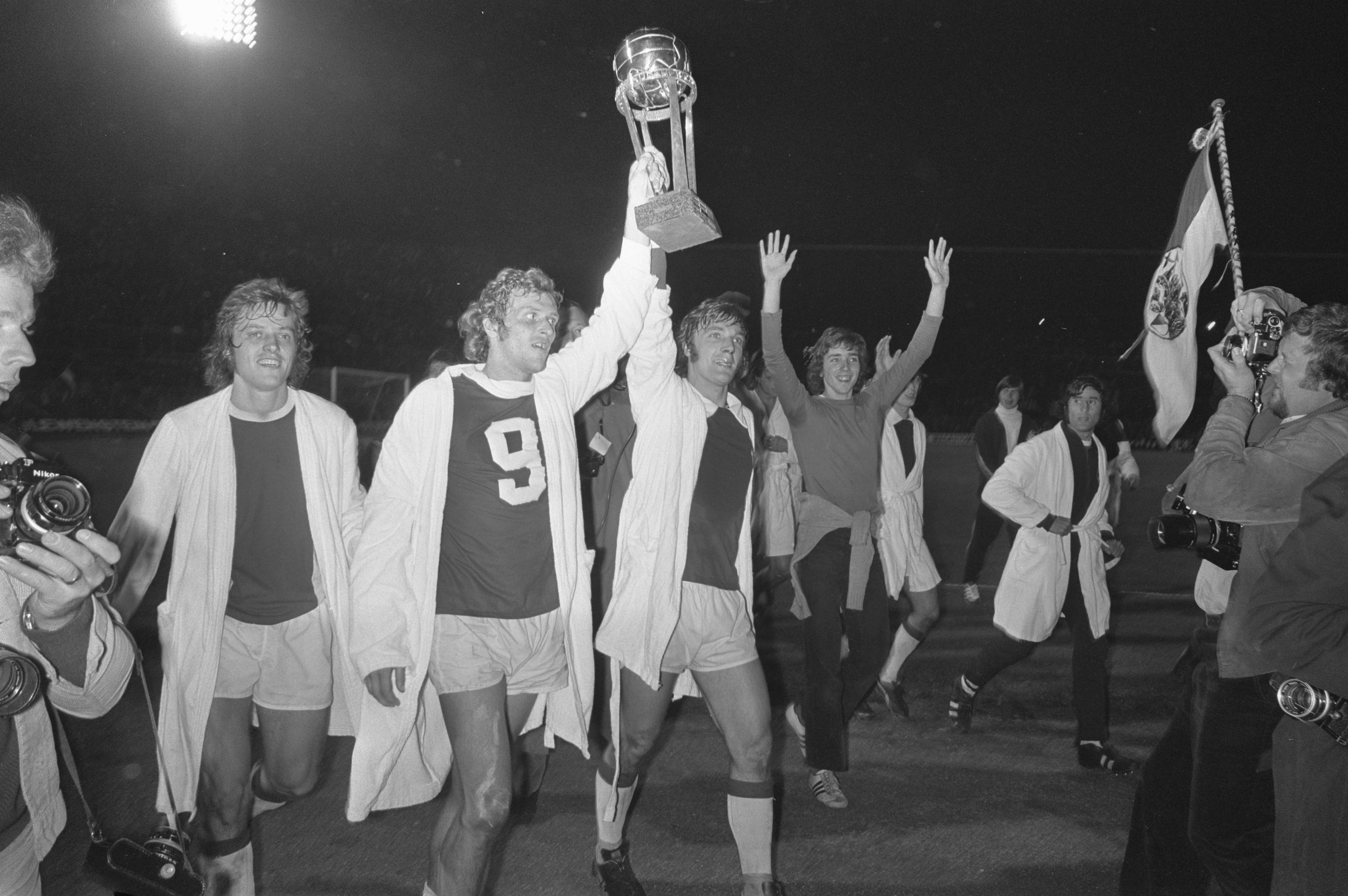
Players of Ajax celebrating with the Cup

Some football personalities attended the match in Avellaneda, being president of Real Madrid CF Santiago Bernabéu one of the most notable visitors. Once the match ended, Bernabéu said:

Independiente was in control of the game in the second half, and I don't understand how they did not realise the short height of their players affected them to compete against the Dutch players. They are prepared for those emergencies and closed files to resist Independiente's attack. The local team lacked the time and luck to win.

In the second leg held in Amsterdam, Ajax made a great performance, showing all their virtues to easily defeat Independiente 3–0, therefore winning their first Intercontinental trophy 3–1 on points (4–1 on aggregate).

== Match details ==
=== First leg ===
1972 Intercontinental Cup
6 September 1972
First leg

Independiente (Argentina)	1–1	(Netherlands) Ajax
Sá 81'	Report	Cruyff 5'

Independiente Stadium, Avellaneda
Attendance: 45,000
Referee: Tofiq Bahramov (Soviet Union)

**Independiente**	**Ajax**

GK	21	(Argentina) Miguel Ángel Santoro
DF	4	(Argentina) Eduardo Commisso
DF	20	(Argentina) Miguel Ángel López
DF	6	(Argentina) Francisco Sá
DF	3	(Uruguay) Ricardo Pavoni (c)
MF	18	(Argentina) José Pastoriza
MF	10	(Argentina) Alejandro Semenewicz
MF	8	(Argentina) Miguel Ángel Raimondo	(substituted off) 70'
FW	7	(Argentina) Agustín Balbuena
FW	19	(Argentina) Eduardo Maglioni
FW	15	(Italy) Dante Mircoli
Substitutes:
DF	9	(Argentina) Carlos Bulla	(substituted on) 70'
Manager:
(Argentina) Pedro Dellacha

GK	1	(Netherlands) Heinz Stuy
DF	2	(West Germany) Horst Blankenburg
DF	3	(Netherlands) Wim Suurbier
DF	4	(Netherlands) Barry Hulshoff
DF	5	(Netherlands) Ruud Krol
MF	6	(Netherlands) Arie Haan
MF	7	(Netherlands) Johan Neeskens
MF	8	(Netherlands) Gerrie Mühren
FW	9	(Netherlands) Sjaak Swart
FW	14	(Netherlands) Johan Cruyff	(substituted off) 30'
FW	11	(Netherlands) Piet Keizer (c)
Substitutes:
MF	12	(Netherlands) Arnold Mühren	(substituted on) 30'
Manager:
(Romania) Ștefan Kovács

== Second leg ==
=== Match details ===
28 September 1972
Second leg

Ajax (Netherlands)	3–0	(Argentina) Independiente
Neeskens 12'; Rep 65', 80'	Report

Olympic Stadium, Amsterdam
Attendance: 46,511
Referee: José Romei (Paraguay)

**Ajax**	**Independiente**

GK	1	(Netherlands) Heinz Stuy
DF	12	(West Germany) Horst Blankenburg
DF	3	(Netherlands) Wim Suurbier
DF	4	(Netherlands) Barry Hulshoff
DF	5	(Netherlands) Ruud Krol
MF	15	(Netherlands) Arie Haan
MF	7	(Netherlands) Johan Neeskens
MF	9	(Netherlands) Gerrie Mühren
FW	8	(Netherlands) Sjaak Swart	(substituted off) 61'
FW	14	(Netherlands) Johan Cruyff
FW	11	(Netherlands) Piet Keizer (c)
Substitutes:
DF	16	(Netherlands) Johnny Rep	(substituted on) 61'
Manager:
(Romania) Ștefan Kovács

GK	21	(Argentina) Miguel Ángel Santoro
DF	4	(Argentina) Eduardo Commisso
DF	20	(Argentina) Miguel Ángel López
DF	6	(Argentina) Francisco Sá
DF	3	(Uruguay) Ricardo Pavoni (c)
MF	18	(Argentina) José Pastoriza
MF	10	(Argentina) Alejandro Semenewicz
MF	22	(Uruguay) Luis Garisto	(substituted off) 73'
FW	7	(Argentina) Agustín Balbuena
FW	19	(Argentina) Eduardo Maglioni
FW	15	(Italy) Dante Mircoli	(substituted off) 64'
Substitutes:
DF	9	(Argentina) Carlos Bulla	(substituted on) 64'
MF	13	(Argentina) Manuel Magán	(substituted on) 73'
Manager:
(Argentina) Pedro Dellacha

== See also ==
- 1971–72 European Cup
- 1972 Copa Libertadores
- AFC Ajax in international football competitions
