= 1973 Intercontinental Cup =

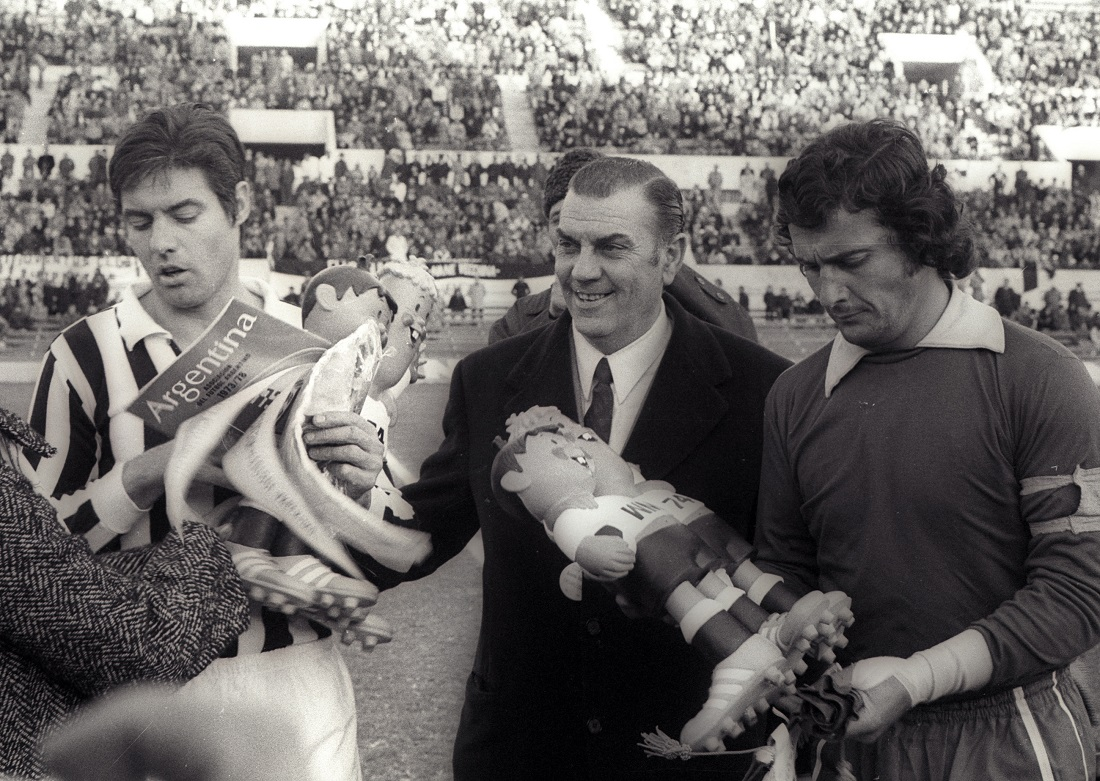
- Before the kick-off, Juventus' Sandro Salvadore (left) and Independiente's Miguel Ángel Santoro (right)
Juventus	Independiente
(Italy)	(Argentina)
0	1
- Date: 28 November 1973
- Venue: Stadio Olimpico, Rome
- Referee: Alfred Delcourt (Belgium)
- Attendance: 22,489

The 1973 Intercontinental Cup was an association football match played on 28 November 1973, between Juventus, runners-up of the 1972–73 European Cup, and Independiente, winners of the 1973 Copa Libertadores. The match was played at the Stadio Olimpico in Rome. It was Juventus' first appearance in the competition and Independiente's fourth appearance after the defeats against Internazionale in 1964 and 1965 and against Ajax in 1972. Despite initially refusing to participate in the competition, Juventus replaced Ajax as the representative UEFA team in the competition after Ajax, as the European champions declined to contest a possible meeting in South America officially for financial reasons. The Cup was played in a single match instead of a two-legged final, as happened in the previous and following years until 1979.

== Background ==
Independiente were the 1973 Copa Libertadores winners and defeated the Chilean side Colo-Colo in the finals with a goal in extra time. It was their second successive win, and thus they had longed for an Intercontinental Cup win since they had lost the previous final against the 1972–73 European Cup winners, AFC Ajax . That team was led by captain Johan Cruyff (also captain of the Dutch national squad), with most of its players being part of the Netherlands national team that would go on to show the revolutionary tactical theory (called "Total Football") at the 1974 FIFA World Cup two years later. Independiente were thus eager to get revenge for their loss in the previous match. Nevertheless, the Dutch club refused to play in the 1973 edition, alleging that they didn't want to suffer the "rough game" of the Argentine team again. Therefore, the runner-up of 1972–73 European Cup, Juventus, took Ajax's place to contest the competition. The Italian club refused to come to Buenos Aires, making it a condition to play a unique match in Rome. Independiente executives accepted it, scheduling the match for November 28, 1973.

José Pastoriza, who had been the captain and leader of the Copa Libertadores winning team, did not play the match because he was transferred to AS Monaco shortly before the final in Rome.

== Match ==
=== Summary ===
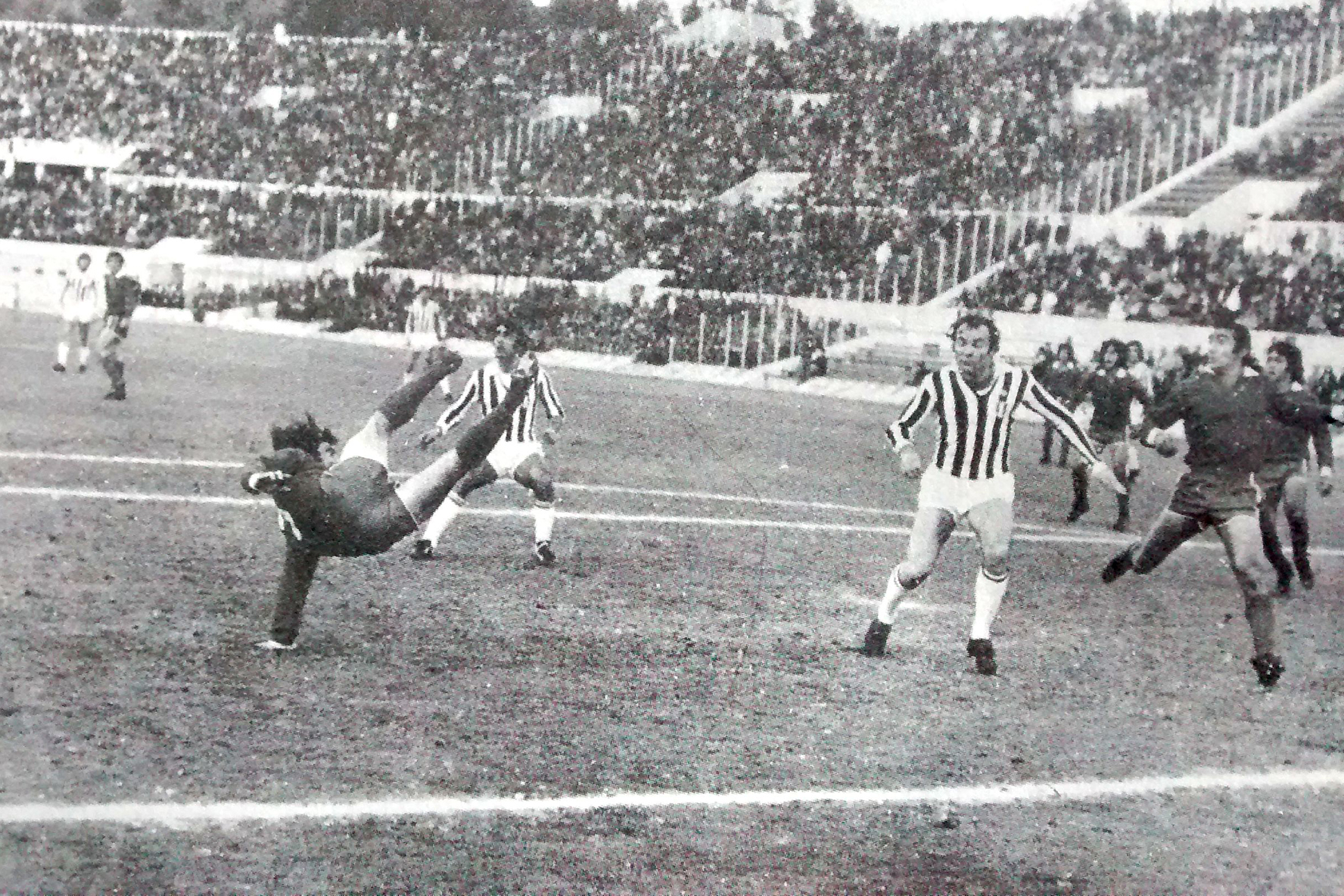
Juventus' forwards José João Altafini (foreground) and Pietro Anastasi (background) in action versus Independiente's defenders

The match for the most part was dominated by the Italian side, with the Bianconeri having several opportunities to take the lead with two shots on the cross, a penalty kick, drawn by Cuccureddu, which ended up over the bar and a shot in the last minutes of the match, which was blocked by the Argentine goalkeeper Santoro in daring action. Ten minutes from the end, a succession of wall-passes made between Raimondo and Bertoni firstly, and then between Bertoni and Bochini towards the penalty box, ended in the goal of the victory for the Diablos Rojos ("Red Devils").

=== Details ===
28 November 1973
15:30 UTC+1

Juventus (Italy)	0–1	(Argentina) Independiente
	Report	Bochini 80'

Stadio Olimpico, Rome
Attendance: 22,489
Referee: Alfred Delcourt (Belgium)

Juventus	Independiente

GK	1	(Italy) Dino Zoff (c)
SW	2	(Italy) Luciano Spinosi	(substituted off) 74'
CB	5	(Italy) Francesco Morini
CB	6	(Italy) Sandro Salvadore
LB	3	(Italy) Gianpietro Marchetti
RM	7	(Italy) Franco Causio
CM	8	(Italy) Antonello Cuccureddu
LM	4	(Italy) Claudio Gentile
RW	9	(Italy) Pietro Anastasi
CF	10	(Italy) (Brazil) José Altafini
LW	11	(Italy) Roberto Bettega	(substituted off) 74'
Substitutes:
DF		(Italy) Silvio Longobucco	(substituted on) 74'
MF		(Italy) Fernando Viola	(substituted on) 74'
Manager:
(Czechoslovakia) Čestmír Vycpálek

GK	1	(Argentina) Miguel Ángel Santoro (c)
RB	4	(Argentina) Eduardo Commisso
CB	2	(Argentina) Miguel Ángel López
CB	6	(Argentina) Francisco Sá
LB	3	(Uruguay) Ricardo Pavoni	Booked
RM	8	(Argentina) Rubén Galván
CM	5	(Argentina) Miguel Ángel Raimondo
LM	10	(Argentina) Ricardo Bochini
RW	7	(Argentina) Agustín Balbuena
CF	9	(Argentina) Eduardo Maglioni
LW	11	(Argentina) Daniel Bertoni		(substituted off) 83'
Substitutes:
FW		(Argentina) Alejandro Semenewicz		(substituted on) 83'
Manager:
(Argentina) Roberto Ferreiro

== Aftermath ==
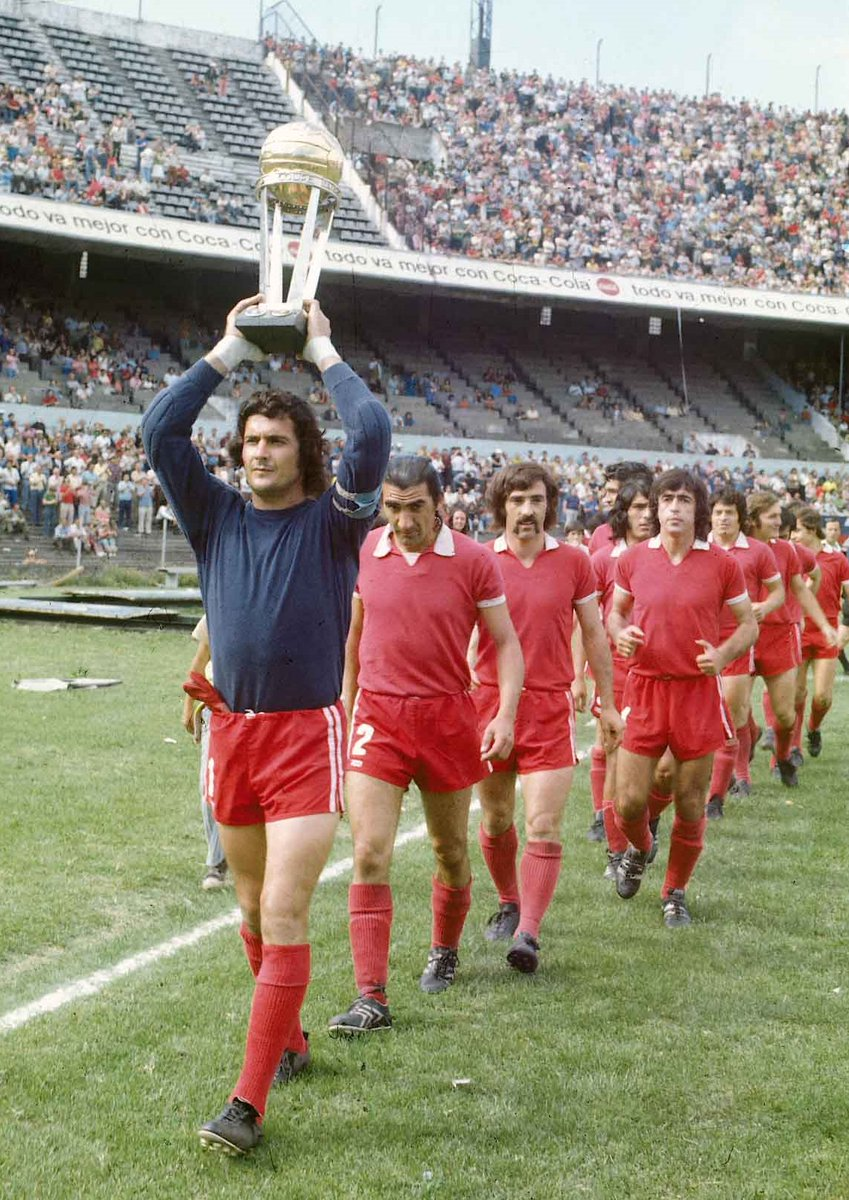
Independiente players (with captain Miguel Ángel Santoro holding the Intercontinental trophy) entering to the pitch in Argentina when returning from Rome, 1973

It was the first Intercontinental Cup won by Independiente (and the third won by an Argentine club after Racing and Estudiantes de La Plata success in 1967 and 1968 respectively). The victory was largely celebrated by Independiente fans due to the importance given to that competition in Argentina.

The victory was also the breakthrough of 19-year old Ricardo Bochini as a rising star. Bochini would continue and finish his career always playing for Independiente, becoming one of the greatest idols in the history of the club. On the other hand, the other keyplayer of the match, Daniel Bertoni, would then win the first FIFA World Cup with Argentina in 1978, also scoring the third goal v Netherlands in the final.

== In their own words ==
The following phrases are extracted from an interview to Ricardo Bochini, Daniel Bertoni and Francisco Sá, three of Independiente players that won the Cup in 1973:

It was a very important match in my career. The goal gave me the opportunity to be famous, not only for Independiente but for all people related with football in Argentina. It was because the match was aired by the RAI for several countries in the world.

— Ricardo Bochini

Nobody trusted us because nobody believed we could win the cup in a single match series. When we crowned champions, the only people supporting the team were the Fragata Libertad crew that were in Italy. They were our only supporters in the stadium

— Daniel Bertoni

The Juventus players were very fast and strong, they had 3 or 4 players in the Italy national team and another in Brazil. Despite we had won the Copa Libertadores some months earlier, we were not in a good level and therefore it was very hard to win the match

— Ricardo Bochini

To achieve a victory in an only match and playing as visitor, the team had no low points. On the other hand, Bochini and Bertoni, were champions of the world at a very early age

— Francisco Sá

If we had played Ajax instead of Juventus, the match would have been so much complicated because Ajax was the best team in the world

— Ricardo Bochini

== The lost video ==
Although the match was broadcast by Canal 7 in Argentina, it is believed that the video containing the images of the match could have been erased or stolen during the military dictatorship that governed from 1976. As those images were lost, the interest of Independiente fans and journalist in the match was increasing as years were by.

On the basis on some Independiente members (with then president of the institution Javier Cantero among them) initiative, the search for the video started. After some contacts with RAI (the Italian broadcasting company that had aired the match in 1973), they provided a copy of the film to musical producer (and Independiente fan) Mariano Asch, putting as condition it had to be returned after being used in Argentina.

In 2009, the 3-minute long copy of the video was aired for the first time during a celebration in Teatro Roma of Avellaneda held to commemorate the 36th. anniversary of the victory. Independiente legend Ricardo Bochini (who scored the goal at the final in 1973) was the star guest attending the event.

Watching the video was a huge surprise for me because I didn't know (the video) existed. I loved it because I didn't remember how the goal had been exactly. I did remember the goal had come from a wall-pass with (Daniel) Bertoni. To relive that experience was like completing the history of that match

— Ricardo Bochini, during an interview in 2013

== See also ==
- 1972–73 European Cup
- 1973 Copa Libertadores
- Juventus F.C. in European football
