= Sergio Messen =

Chilean footballer (1949–2010)

- Messen in 1976

Personal information
- Full name: Sergio Iván José Messen Angarita
- Date of birth: 8 March 1949
- Place of birth: Santiago, Chile
- Date of death: 1 January 2010 (aged 60)
- Place of death: Santiago, Chile
- Position: Forward

Youth career
- Universidad Católica

Senior career*
Years	Team	Apps	(Gls)
1967–1970	Universidad Católica		
1971–1974	Colo-Colo		
1974–1981	Palestino		

International career
1971–1973	Chile	11	(2)
- * Club domestic league appearances and goals

Sergio Iván José Messen Angarita (8 March 1949 – 1 January 2010) was a Chilean footballer. Nicknamed "Keko", he played as a forward primarily for Colo-Colo in the early 1970s whilst primarily remaining with Palestino throughout the majority of his career as a player. He also played for his home country of Chile throughout the 1970s including the 1974 FIFA World Cup qualifiers.

== Club career ==
Messen began playing within the youth sector for Universidad Católica where he would stand out for being a major goalscorer. He would make his senior debut on 1967 as a reserve and would play until 1970 as he then played for Colo-Colo. Between 1971 and 1973, he would play in 90 matches with 30 goals being scored. He would oversee the club winning their 11th title in the 1972 Primera División de Chile and play in the 1973 Copa Libertadores finals. During the second semester of the 1974 Primera División de Chile, he would sign for Palestino and would win in the 1975 and 1977 Copa Chile as well as in the 1978 Primera División de Chile, winning its second title. He would retire from professional football in 1981.

== International career ==
Messen represented Chile in eleven matches. His official debut would be on 22 March 1970 in a friendly in a 0–5 loss against Brazil. He would score his first international goal in another friendly against Brazil on 4 October 1970 in a 1–5 loss. His second goal would be within another friendly against Bolivia in a 4–3 victory on 15 August 1971 as most of his international appearances would be friendlies. He would play in the 1972 Copa Carlos Dittborn in the second match with his final international appearance being in a 0–2 loss against Peru during the 1974 FIFA World Cup qualifiers as he would not make the final squad despite Chile ultimately qualifying for the tournament.

== Death ==
Messen was found dead on 1 January 2010 at Providencia, Santiago. Initial reports would state that he had died through suicide, but later reports would state that he had been killed through assault. However, the finalized cause of death for Messen was determined to be through a diabetic coma.
