= Alejandro Silva =

Alejandro Silva may refer to:

- Alejandro Silva (footballer, 1947-2018), Chilean football left-back
- Alejandro Silva (boxer) (born 1957), Puerto Rican boxer
- Alejandro Silva (athlete) (born 1958), retired long-distance runner from Chile
- Alejandro Silva (musician) (born 1969), Chilean heavy metal guitarist
- Alejandro Silva (footballer, born 1989), Uruguayan football right-back for Libertad

== See also ==
- Alejandro da Silva (born 1983), Paraguayan football striker
