= Miguel Ángel Giachello =

Argentine footballer (born 1950)

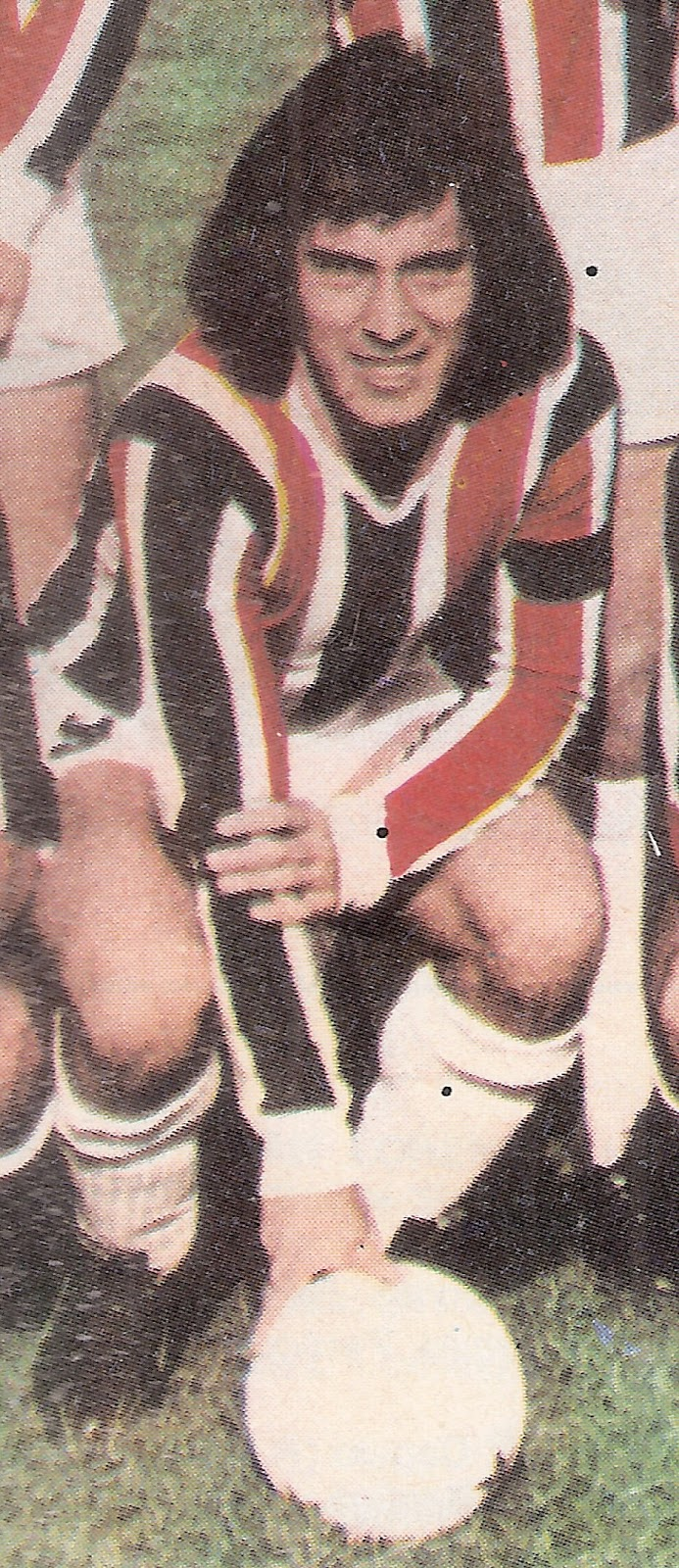
- Giachello in 1974

Personal information
- Full name: Miguel Ángel Giachello
- Date of birth: 12 August 1950 (age 76)
- Place of birth: Zárate, Buenos Aires, Argentina
- Position: Forward

Senior career*
Years	Team	Apps	(Gls)
1969–1971	Independiente		
1972	Estudiantes		
1973	Independiente		
1973–1974	Chacarita Juniors		
1975	Newell's Old Boys		
1976–1977	San Andrés		
1978	Unión de Santa Fe		
1979	Racing		
1980	Unión de Santa Fe		
1981	Racing		
Total		222	(67)
- * Club domestic league appearances and goals

Miguel Ángel Giachello (born 12 August 1950) is an Argentine retired footballer. Nicknamed "Che", he played for various clubs throughout his career, notably playing for Independiente, Chacarita Juniors and Unión de Santa Fe. He would also play abroad in Spain for San Andrés for the 1976–77 Segunda División.

== Career ==
Giachello began his career by making his debut with Independiente in 1969 at the age of only 18 against Gimnasia de La Plata which would end in a 3–2 loss. He would play for the club until 1973 after a brief interlude with Estudiantes in 1972. He would describe his tenure with the club as being initially intimidating due to playing with several stars of the club such as Ricardo Pavoni, Miguel Ángel Santoro, Héctor Yazalde and Aníbal Tarabini but later learnt the emphasis on teamwork and collaboration within the club's functions. He would gain enough prominence in the club to where he was selected to play in the 1973 Copa Libertadores finals against Colo-Colo. Initially, the two teams would only end their matches in draws to where a third match had to be played to determine the winner of the tournament. The third match appeared to be no different as it had to be dragged into extra time. Giachello would then score the determining goal at the 107th mark, scoring one of the most important goals of the club's history as Independiente would earn their second title in a row. He would also be part of the main offensive formation with the club alongside Hugo Salomón Abdala and Dante Mírcoli.

Following his success with the club, he was later sold to Chacarita Juniors. He would play for the club in the 1973 and the 1974 Argentine Primera División with his debut match being on 21 October 1973 in a 1–3 defeat against Atlanta. He later briefly played for Newell's Old Boys to play in the 1975 Argentine Primera División before later playing abroad in Spain for San Andrés in the 1976–77 Segunda División where the club would fall victim to relegation by the end of the season. His final seasons would have him return to Argentina to play interchangeably for Unión de Santa Fe and Racing Club de Avellaneda until his retirement in 1981.

== Personal life ==
Miguel Ángel's son, Lucas, is currently a physical education teacher based in Baradero.
