= Alejandro Silva (footballer, born 1947) =

Chilean footballer (1947–2018)

- Silva Vilches in 1973

Personal information
- Full name: Alejandro Octavio Silva Vilches
- Date of birth: 31 December 1947
- Place of birth: Molina, Maule, Chile
- Date of death: 21 December 2018 (aged 70)
- Place of death: Molina, Maule, Chile
- Position: Left-back

Youth career
- ???–1965: Atlético de Molina
- 1965–1968: Universidad de Chile

Senior career*
Years	Team	Apps	(Gls)
1969	Universidad de Chile		
1970–1973	Colo-Colo		
1974–1975	Unión Española		
1977–1978	Aviación		
- * Club domestic league appearances and goals

Alejandro Octavio Silva Vilches (31 December 1947 – 21 December 2018) was a Chilean footballer. Nicknamed El Huaso, he primarily played for Universidad de Chile, Colo-Colo, Unión Española and Aviación where he would be part of several winning squads throughout his career. He would notably play in the 1973 Copa Libertadores finals against Independiente.

== Club career ==
=== Club Universidad de Chile ===
Silva was born on 8 March 1949 at Molina. He would begin his career as a youth footballer as a forward for local club Atlético de Molina where he was recognized for his physical strength as well as the power of his left foot. In a local championship held at Talca, he would be contracted to play for the youth sector of Club Universidad de Chile beginning in 1965.

He was then part of the tail end of the football dynasty of Universidad de Chile of the 1960s as he would debut for the senior team in November 1969 which was known as the "Ballet Azul" due to the club's elegant performance on field. At one point, Silva was sponsored by club legend Leonel Sánchez. Alongside Sánchez, he worked as a left-back to cover defensive play but had enough versatility, strength and temperament to where he could cover all the defensive sectors in matches. His debut season would also mark the first national title in his career as the club would win the 1969 Primera División de Chile which would mark the end of the football dynasty.

=== Colo-Colo ===
Beginning in 1970, Silva was contracted by Colo-Colo to play for the club as Sánchez would suggest as Silva reminded him of his former strength and speed at the left field as he was approaching the end of his career. The two would play in the club as they would be in the starting XI for the 1970 season. His career with the club was highlighted by various titles and achievements. Following Manuel Rubilar's injury, Silva would play in the 1973 Copa Libertadores finals against Independiente where the club would ultimately be runners-up. He would also be part of the winning squads of the 1970 and 1972 Primera División de Chile.

== Later career ==
Following his stint at Colo-Colo, he would play for Unión Española for the 1974 Primera División de Chile. Under the management of Luis Santibáñez, Silva was considered to be a part of his new project in re-developing the team. This would culminate in the club winning the 1975 Primera División de Chile with Silva being part of the winning squad. Following the 1975, he would announce his retirement for the 1976 Primera División de Chile but would then return for the 1977 edition to play for Aviación until his definitive retirement in 1978.
