= Heinz Stuy =

Dutch footballer (born 1945)

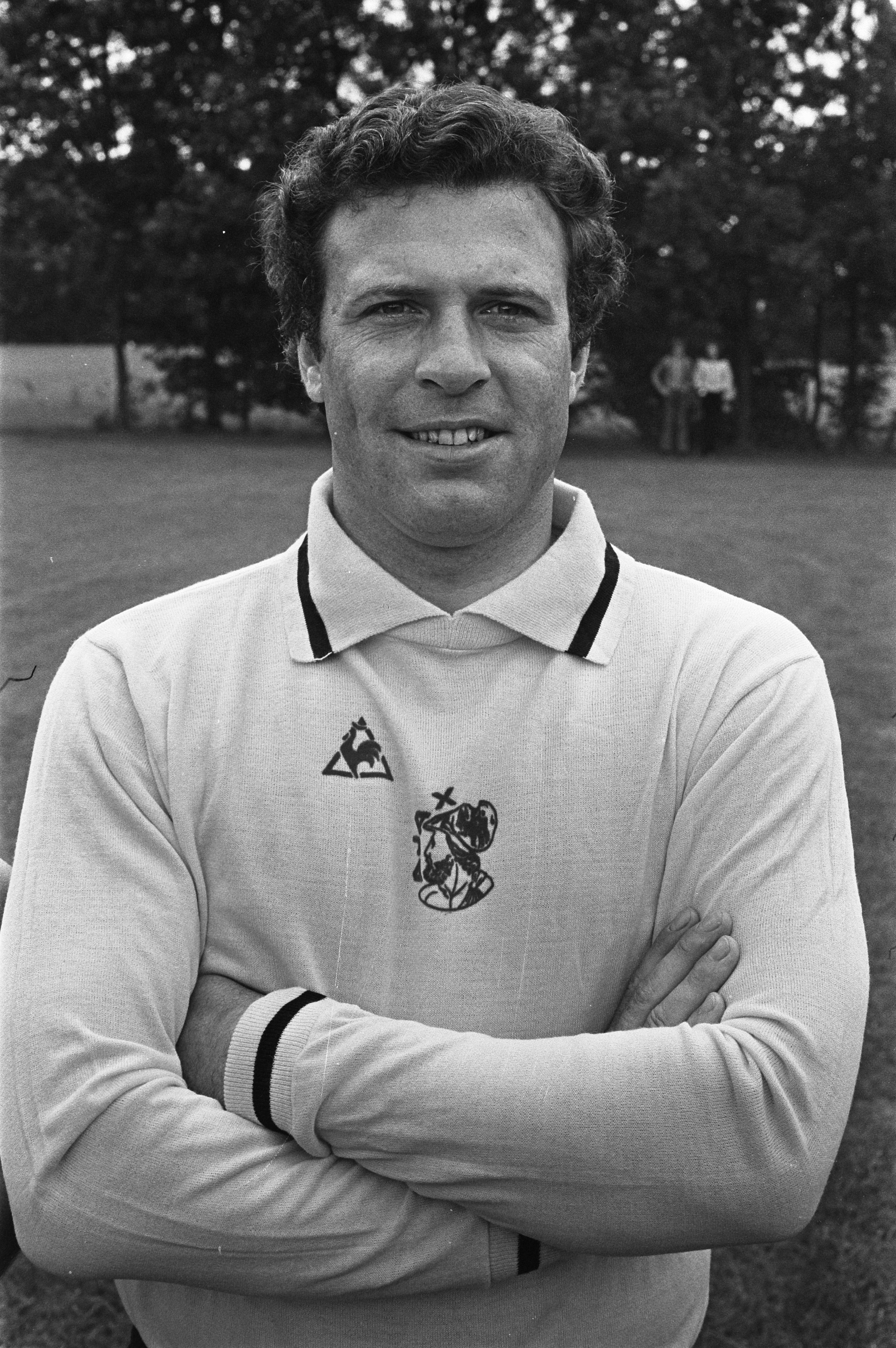
- Stuy in 1975

Personal information
- Date of birth: 6 February 1945 (age 81)
- Place of birth: Wanne-Eickel, Germany
- Position: Goalkeeper

Senior career*
Years	Team	Apps	(Gls)
1963–1967	Telstar	115	(0)
1967–1976	Ajax	139	(0)
1976–1978	FC Amsterdam	16	(0)
Total		270	(0)
- * Club domestic league appearances and goals

Heinz Stuy (born 6 February 1945) is a Dutch former football goalkeeper who played for AFC Ajax and was part of their European Cup victories in 1971, 1972 and 1973.

== Career ==
Stuy was born in Wanne-Eickel to a Dutch father and German mother during the final months of World War II in 1945. His family remained there until relocating to IJmuiden when he was seven years old. He quickly learned Dutch and was able to successfully integrate into the community at a time of great anti-German hostility after the war.

Nicknamed Heinz Kroket ('Heinz Croquette') because he would sometimes drop a high ball as if it were a hot croquette, Stuy won the Intercontinental Cup, three European Cups, two European Super Cups, four league titles and three Dutch Cups with Ajax in the club's "golden era". Despite this success at club level he never appeared for the Netherlands national team, sharing with Bernd Dürnberger (a Bayern Munich player of the 1970s and 1980s) a distinction of having won the most major club titles without having ever played for his country.

Stuy set a record for most minutes played by a goalkeeper without conceding in the European Cup final between 1971 and 1973 (270 minutes in 2–0 victories over Panathinaikos and Inter Milan, and a 1–0 win over Juventus); however it was quickly beaten by a small margin – and never surpassed since then – by Bayern Munich's Sepp Maier, who accumulated 276 consecutive unbeaten minutes between 1974 and 1976 (1–1, 4–0, 2–0, 1–0).

== Honours ==
Ajax

- Eredivisie: 1971–72, 1972–73
- KNVB Cup: 1969–70, 1970–71, 1971–72
- European Cup: 1970–71, 1971–72, 1972–73
- European Super Cup: 1972
- Intercontinental Cup: 1972
