= Dante Mircoli =

Italian-Argentine footballer (1947–2024)

Personal information
- Date of birth: 12 March 1947
- Place of birth: Rome, Italy
- Date of death: 4 December 2024 (aged 77)
- Place of death: Avellaneda, Buenos Aires Province, Argentina
- Position: Midfielder

Senior career*
| Years | Team | Apps | (Gls) |
| 1965–1970 | Independiente | 127 | (8) |
| 1970 | Platense | 8 | (0) |
| 1973 | Sampdoria | 9 | (2) |
| 1973–1975 | Estudiantes (LP) | 28 | (0) |
| 1975 | Catania | | |
| 1976 | Lecco | 2 | (0) |
| 1976 | Racing Club | 6 | (0) |
- * Club domestic league appearances and goals

Dante Mircoli (12 March 1947 – 4 December 2024) was an Italian-Argentine footballer and coach, who spent the majority of his career in Argentina.

== Playing career ==
Mircoli made his professional debut in 1965 for Independiente. During his time with the club they won two league championships and Copa Libertadores 1972.

As he always kept his Italian passport, he was eligible to play in Serie A during the 1970s, when Italian clubs were not allowed to sign foreign players. Mircoli played for a number of clubs in Italy with no great success, he made nine appearances in Serie A for Sampdoria in 1973 and also played for Catania and Lecco.

Mircoli also made appearances in the Argentine Primera for Estudiantes de La Plata and Racing Club de Avellaneda.

== Managerial career ==
Mircoli managed a number of clubs in the lower leagues of Argentine football, including; Estudiantes (BA), Douglas Haig, San Telmo and Estudiantes (RC).

== Personal life and death ==
Mircoli was born in Rome, Italy on 12 March 1947. He moved to Argentina as a child and became a naturalised citizen. Mircoli died in Avellaneda, Argentina on 4 December 2024, at the age of 77.

== Honours ==
Independiente

- Primera División Argentina: Nacional 1967, Metropolitano 1971
- Copa Libertadores: 1972
