= Francisco Sá =

Argentine footballer

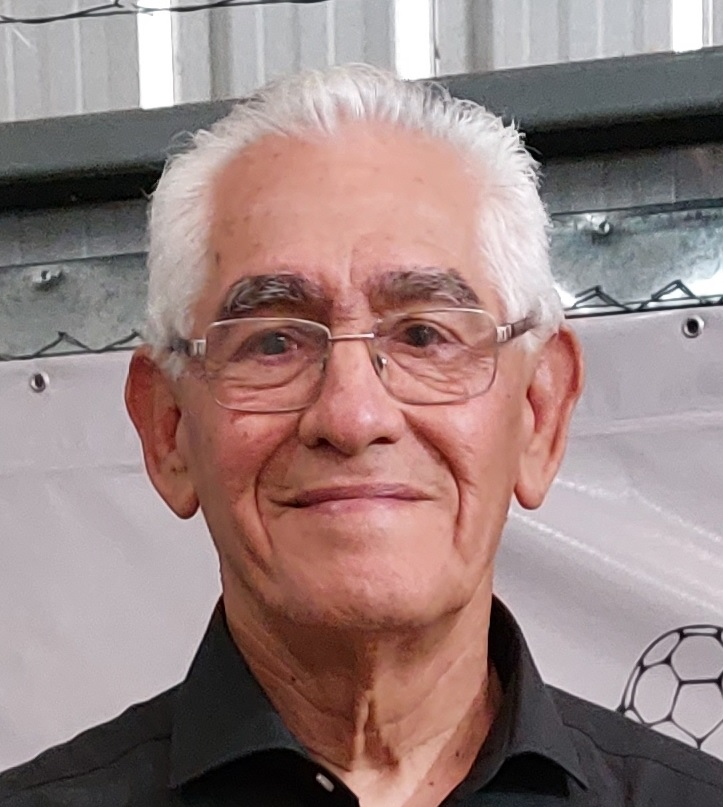
- Sá in 2022

Personal information
- Full name: Francisco Pedro Manuel Sá
- Date of birth: 25 October 1945 (age 81)
- Place of birth: Las Lomitas, Argentina
- Position: Defender

Youth career
- Central Goya

Senior career*
| Years | Team | Apps | (Gls) |
| 1965–1966 | Central Goya | ? | (?) |
| 1968 | Huracán (C) | 12 | (0) |
| 1969–1970 | River Plate | 2 | (0) |
| 1971–1975 | Independiente | 180 | (6) |
| 1976–1981 | Boca Juniors | 166 | (1) |
| 1981–1982 | Gimnasia de Jujuy | 1 | (0) |

International career
| 1973–1974 | Argentina | 12 | (0) |
- * Club domestic league appearances and goals

Francisco Pedro Manuel Sá (born 25 October 1945) is an Argentine former professional footballer who played as a defender mainly for Independiente and Boca Juniors. Sá holds the record for the most Copa Libertadores titles, he won six; 4 consecutive titles with Club Atlético Independiente between 1972 and 1975, and a further 2 with Boca Juniors in 1977 and 1978.

== Career ==
Sá started his career with Central Goya in the lower leagues, he then had a spell with Huracán de Corrientes before joining River Plate in 1969.

In 1971 Sá joined Independiente where he was part of the team that won the Metropolitano 1971 title followed by an unprecedented four consecutive Copa Libertadores titles. He also won the first of his two Intercontinental Cup title in 1973.

In 1976 Sá was transferred to Boca Juniors where he won a further six major titles, 2 Metropolitano, 2 Copa Libertadores, 1 Nacional and 1 Intercontinental Cup. In his time at Boca he played 195 games for the club in all competitions, scoring 2 goals.

After leaving Boca in 1981 Sá played for Gimnasia de Jujuy for one season before his retirement in 1982.

== Honours ==
Independiente

- Argentine Primera División (1): Metropolitano 1971
- Copa Libertadores (4): 1972, 1973, 1974, 1975
- Copa Interamericana (2): 1972, 1974
- Intercontinental Cup (1): 1973

Boca Juniors

- Argentine Primera División (2): Metropolitano 1976, Metropolitano 1981
- Copa Libertadores (2): 1977, 1978
- Copa Interamericana runner-up: 1977
- Intercontinental Cup (1): 1977
