= Mario Rubén Mendoza =

Argentine footballer (born 1949)

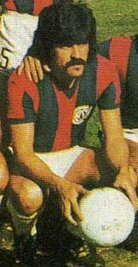
- Mendoza in 1976

Personal information
- Full name: Mario Rubén Mendoza
- Date of birth: 19 January 1949 (age 77)
- Place of birth: Santa Fe, Santa Fe Province, Argentina
- Position: Forward

Senior career*
Years	Team	Apps	(Gls)
1967–1970	Unión de Santa Fe	48	(6)
1971–1972	Newell's Old Boys	40	(16)
1973	Independiente	24	(3)
1974–1975	Nîmes	9	(2)
1975–1977	San Lorenzo	86	(5)
1977	Atlético Nacional		
Total		207	(32)
- * Club domestic league appearances and goals

Mario Rubén Mendoza (born 19 January 1949) is an Argentine footballer. Nicknamed "Loco", he played for Independiente and San Lorenzo. He was a part of the winning squad for the 1973 Copa Libertadores as well as playing abroad in France for Nîmes in the 1974–75 French Division 1.

== Career ==
Mendoza was born on 19 January 1949 at Santa Fe. Following the rest of his family, he would begin his career in 1967 by playing for Unión de Santa Fe after being scouted by manager Miguel Ángel Converti alongside Mario Nogara. Throughout the course of his career, he would score 6 goals over the course of 48 matches. He then played for Newell's Old Boys in 1971 and 1972 where he would play alongside players such as Mario Zanabria, Carlos Fenoy, Ángel Silva and Santiago Santamaría under manager Juan Carlos Montes. He would then play for Independiente where he was selected to play in the 1973 Copa Libertadores finals and be a part of the winning squad for the tournament.

He would then travel abroad to France to play for Nîmes in nine matches and two goals in his brief tenure with the club. He would then return to Argentina in 1975 to play for San Lorenzo until 1977. His final overall season would be for Atlético Nacional in 1977 before retiring that same year.
