= Rafael González (Chilean footballer) =

Chilean footballer (born 1950)

Personal information
- Full name: Rafael González Córdova
- Date of birth: 24 April 1950 (age 76)
- Place of birth: Chile
- Position: Midfielder

Senior career*
Years	Team	Apps	(Gls)
- Colo-Colo

International career
- Chile
- * Club domestic league appearances and goals

Rafael González Córdova (born 24 April 1950) is a Chilean football midfielder who played for Chile in the 1974 FIFA World Cup. He also played for Colo-Colo.
