= Agustín Balbuena =

Argentine footballer (1945–2021)

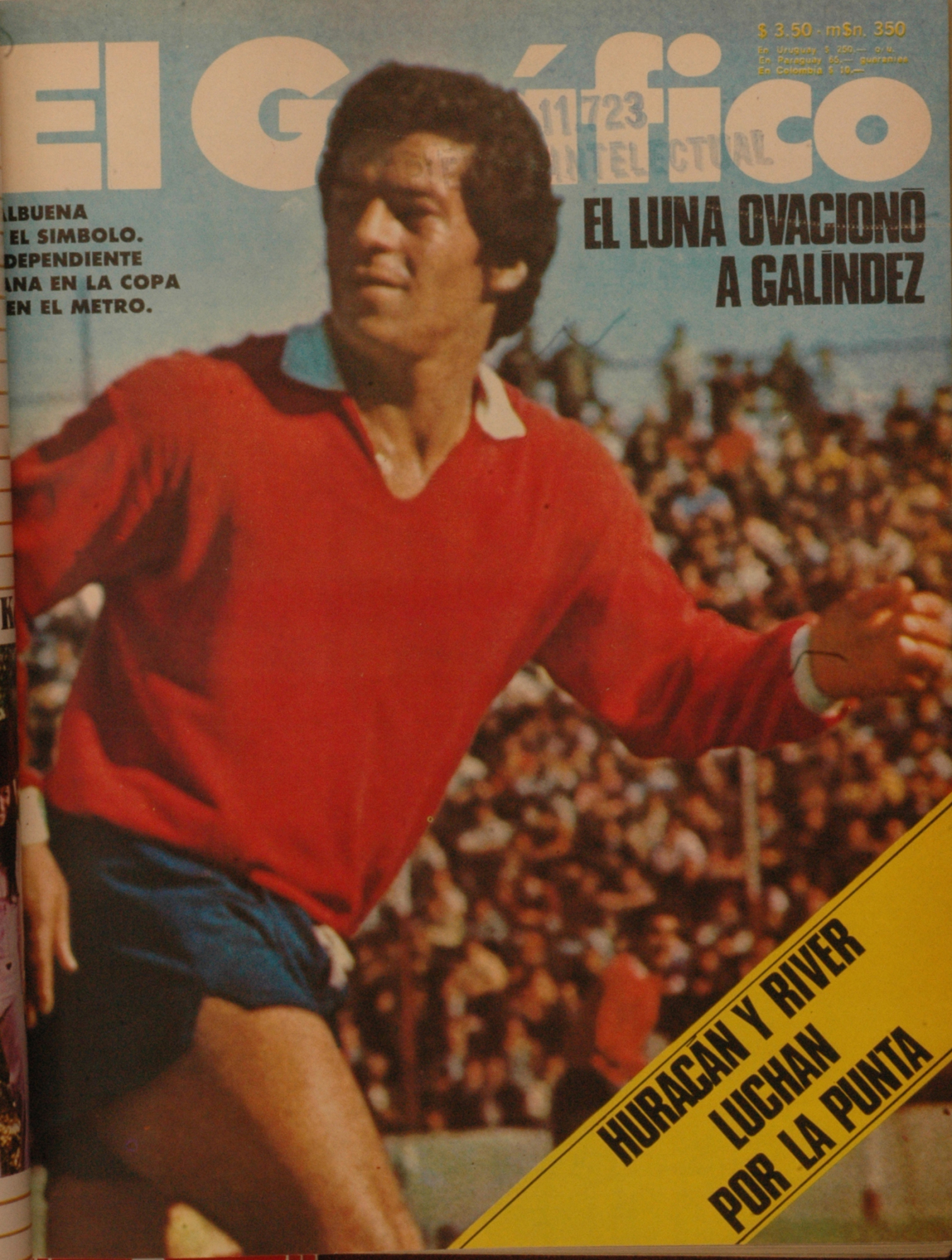
- Balbuena in 1973

Personal information
- Full name: Agustín Alberto Balbuena
- Date of birth: 1 September 1945
- Place of birth: Santa Fe, Argentina
- Date of death: 9 March 2021 (aged 75)
- Position: Striker

Senior career*
| Years | Team | Apps | (Gls) |
| 1964–1969 | Colón de Santa Fe | 114 | (22) |
| 1970 | Rosario Central | 20 | (1) |
| 1971–1975 | Independiente | 172 | (41) |
| 1976 | Racing Club | 19 | (3) |
| 1976–1977 | Bucaramanga | 10 | (0) |
| 1977–1978 | FAS | | |

International career
| 1974 | Argentina | 8 | (0) |
- * Club domestic league appearances and goals

Agustín Alberto Balbuena (1 September 1945 – 9 March 2021) was an Argentine football striker who won four Copa Libertadores and one Intercontinental Cup with Club Atlético Independiente.

== Career ==
Balbuena began his professional playing career in 1964 with home town club Colón de Santa Fe, after a spell with Racing Club. He played for Rosario Central where he was a losing finalist in the 1970 Nacional.

In 1971 Balbuena joined Club Atlético Independiente where he became an important player during the most successful period in the history of the club. He appeared with the team that won the 1971 Metropolitano to qualify for the Copa Libertadores. Independiente won Copa Libertadores on four consecutive occasions: 1972, 1973, 1974 and 1975. He scored the winning goal in the Copa Intercontinental in 1973 against Juventus.

Balbuena was included in the Argentina national team for the 1974 FIFA World Cup, one of eight national team occasions.

Later in his career he played for Bucaramanga of Colombia and CD FAS of El Salvador.

== Death ==
Balbuena died aged 75 on 9 March 2021.

== Honours ==
Colón

- Primera B: 1965

Independiente

- Primera División Argentina: 1971 Metropolitano
- Copa Libertadores: 1972, 1973, 1974, 1975
- Copa Intercontinental: 1973
- Copa Interamericana: 1972, 1973, 1974
