= Adolfo Nef =

Chilean footballer (born 1946)

Personal information
- Full name: Adolfo Nef Sanhueza
- Date of birth: 18 January 1946 (age 80)
- Place of birth: Lota, Chile
- Height: 1.78 m (5 ft 10 in)
- Position: Goalkeeper

Senior career*
Years	Team	Apps	(Gls)
1963–1964	Lota Schwager	14	(0)
1965–1972	Universidad de Chile	239	(0)
1973–1980	Colo-Colo	240	(0)
1981	Universidad Católica	23	(0)
1982–1987	Magallanes	123	(0)
1987	San Luis	8	(0)
Total		647	(0)

International career
1969–1977	Chile	42	(0)
- * Club domestic league appearances and goals

Adolfo Nef Sanhueza (born January 18, 1946) is a former Chilean football goalkeeper, who played for the Chile national team between 1969 and 1977, gaining 42 caps. He was part of the Chile squad for the 1974 World Cup.

At club level, Nef played for Lota Schwager, Universidad de Chile, Colo-Colo, Universidad Católica and Magallanes.

== Personal life ==
His daughter, Nicole, is a former television personality from the Chilean TV program Mekano.

Nef was elected as a councillor for San Miguel commune and was a candidate again in 2012 as a member of the Radical Social Democratic Party of Chile.
