= Alfonso Lara =

Chilean footballer (1946–2013)

Personal information
- Full name: Alfonso Osvaldo Lara Madrid
- Date of birth: 27 April 1946
- Place of birth: Santiago, Chile
- Date of death: 13 August 2013 (aged 67)
- Height: 1.72 m (5 ft 8 in)
- Position: Midfielder

Senior career*
Years	Team	Apps	(Gls)
1968–1969	Magallanes	64	(6)
1970–1972	Lota Schwager	90	(7)
1973–1976	Colo-Colo	112	(4)
1977–1979	Everton	82	(2)
Total		348	(19)

International career
1968–1975	Chile	29	(0)
- * Club domestic league appearances and goals

Alfonso Osvaldo Lara Madrid (27 April 1946 – 13 August 2013) was a Chilean football midfielder who played for Chile in the 1974 FIFA World Cup. He also played for Colo-Colo.
