= Mario Galindo =

Chilean footballer (born 1951)

Personal information
- Full name: Mario Enrique Galindo Calisto
- Date of birth: August 10, 1951 (age 75)
- Place of birth: Punta Arenas, Chile
- Height: 1.72 m (5 ft 7 1/2 in)
- Position: Right-back

Youth career
- CD Magallanes
- Colo-Colo

Senior career*
Years	Team	Apps	(Gls)
1971–1976	Colo Colo	120	(8)
1976–1977	Everton	29	(0)
1977–1983	Colo Colo	89	(3)
1983–1984	Santiago Wanderers	24	(0)
1984–1985	Colo Colo	19	(1)
Total		281	(12)

International career
1972–1982	Chile	29	(0)
- * Club domestic league appearances and goals

Mario Enrique Galindo Calisto (born 10 August 1951 in Punta Arenas) is a Chilean former footballer who played as a right-back.

== Career ==
During his playing career, Galindo played at the club level for Colo Colo. He also represented the Chile national football team in the 1974 FIFA World Cup and the 1982 FIFA World Cup.

== Personal life ==
His father, Daniel, was a football forward nicknamed Mula (Mule) who played for Club Deportivo Victoria from Punta Arenas in the 1930s and 1940s.
