= Eduardo Commisso =

Argentine footballer (born 1948)

Personal information
- Full name: Eduardo Antonio Commisso Villalba
- Date of birth: July 29, 1948 (age 78)
- Place of birth: Avellaneda, Argentina
- Position: Midfielder

Senior career*
| Years | Team | Apps | (Gls) |
| 1968–1975 | Independiente | 208 | (1) |
| 1975–1978 | Hércules CF | 40 | (3) |
| 1978 | Chacarita Juniors | 7 | (1) |
| 1979 | Estudiantes de La Plata | 18 | (0) |
- * Club domestic league appearances and goals as of 01:06, 5 December 2009 (UTC)

Eduardo Antonio Commisso (born 29 July 1948 in Avellaneda) is a former Argentine football midfielder who won the Copa Libertadores with Independiente on four consecutive occasions. He also played for Hércules CF of Spain.

== Career ==
Commisso began playing for his home town club Independiente in 1968. He made 208 league appearances for the club and a further 23 in international tournaments. During his time as an Independiente player the club won two league titles, four consecutive Copa Libertadores and the Copa Intercontinental 1973.

In 1975, he joined Hércules CF where he played 40 times, scoring 3 goals. In 1978, he returned to Argentina and had brief stints with Chacarita Juniors and Estudiantes de La Plata.

== Titles ==
Independiente

- Copa Intercontinental (1): Copa Intercontinental 1973
- Copa Libertadores (4): 1972, 1973, 1974, 1975
- Primera División Argentina (2): Metropolitano 1970 Metropolitano 1971
- Copa Interamericana (2): 1972, 1974
