= Ricardo Pavoni =

Uruguayan footballer (born 1943)

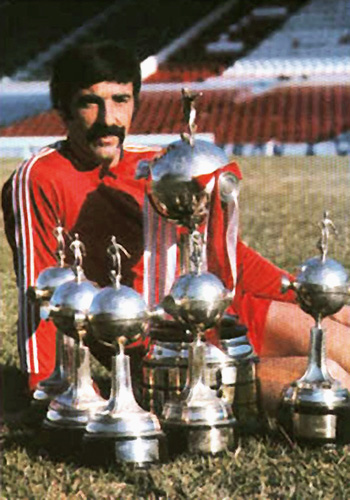

Personal information
- Full name: Ricardo Elvio Pavoni Cúneo
- Date of birth: July 8, 1943 (age 83)
- Place of birth: Montevideo, Uruguay
- Position: Left full-back

Senior career*
Years	Team	Apps	(Gls)
1960–1964	Defensor Sporting Club	?	(?)
1965–1976	Independiente	423	(57)

International career
1962–1974	Uruguay	13	(2)
- * Club domestic league appearances and goals as of March 2008

Ricardo Elvio Pavoni Cúneo (born July 8, 1943, in Montevideo) is a Uruguayan former professional footballer who played as a defender, He played the majority of his career for Club Atlético Independiente of the Argentine Primera Division. Pavoni won 5 Copa Libertadores with Independiente.

== Career ==
=== Club ===
Pavoni began his football career with the Montevidean club Defensor. Disillusioned with life as a footballer, he was on the point of abandoning the game completely and going to work in a casino as a croupier until he was convinced to play football for Independiente of Argentina. The left-sided full-back has been described as a natural leader and the perfect man-marker. He was also responsible for scoring 57 goals.

He arrived to Independiente at age 21 to replace Tomás Rolan, another Uruguayan who had suffered a serious injury. His first match for Independiente was on March 24, 1965, in a Copa Libertadores match. Independiente beat Boca Juniors by two goals to nil.

For twelve seasons (1965–1976) he was idolised by the Independiente fans. He was particularly remembered for his powering runs along the left wing, putting away free kicks with his left foot and for his frequent last-ditch efforts to clear the ball from the goal-line. He is considered by many to be the archetypal Uruguayan footballer.

Pavoni (affectionately known as "el Chivo") won many honours during his career, including the Argentine first division championships three times, the Copa Libertadores five times, the Copa Interamericana on three occasions and one Copa Intercontinental. He was also a member of the Uruguayan squad that took part in the World Cup of 1974, in West Germany. Since retirement, he has been involved with the club as a trainer with reserve and youth teams. He has also been caretaker manager of the first team on several occasions.

=== International ===
Pavoni played 13 times for the Uruguay national team between 1962 and 1974, scoring two goals. He was part of the Uruguay squad for the 1974 FIFA World Cup.

== Honours ==
Independiente

- Argentine Primera División (3): Nacional 1967, Metropolitano 1970, Metropolitano 1971
- Copa Libertadores (5): 1965, 1972, 1973, 1974, 1975
- Copa Interamericana (3): 1973, 1974, 1976
- Intercontinental Cup (1): 1973
