= Eduardo Maglioni =

Argentine footballer (1946–2026)

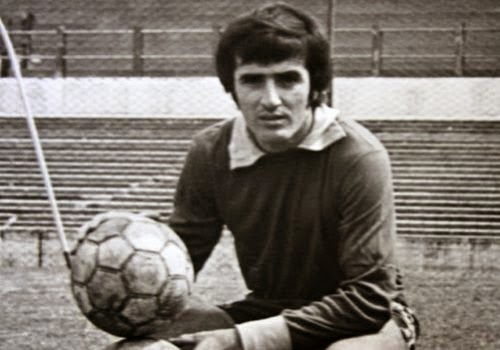
- Maglioni while playing for Independiente

Personal information
- Full name: Eduardo Andrés Maglioni
- Date of birth: 14 April 1946
- Place of birth: Reconquista, Santa Fe Province, Argentina
- Date of death: 18 August 2026 (aged 80)
- Position: Forward

Youth career
- Sarmiento de Resistencia

Senior career*
Years	Team	Apps	(Gls)
1963	Adelante Reconquista		
1964–1968	Sarmiento de Resistencia		
1969–1973	Independiente	135	(58)
1974	Huracán	9	(1)
1974–1975	Millonarios F.C.		
1975	Atlético Nacional		
1976	Unión Magdalena		
- * Club domestic league appearances and goals

Eduardo Andrés Maglioni (14 April 1946 – 18 August 2026) was an Argentine professional footballer who played as a forward. He won three Copa Libertadores with Independiente and scored the fastest recorded hat-trick in the history of Argentine football.

Maglioni began playing with local side Sarmiento de Resistencia. In 1969, he joined Independiente, where he was part of two league and three Copa Libertadores winning teams. He made over 150 appearances for the club in all competitions and scored 60 goals.

On 18 March 1973, Maglioni scored a hat-trick against Gimnasia y Esgrima La Plata in less than one minute fifty one seconds.

Maglioni also played for Huracán in 1974. He died from complications of heart surgery on 18 August 2026, at the age of 80.

== Honours ==
Independiente

- Copa Intercontinental: 1973
- Copa Libertadores: 1972, 1973, 1974
- Primera División Argentina: Metropolitano 1970 Metropolitano 1971
- Copa Interamericana: 1972
