= 1972 Campeonato Nacional Primera División =

Campeonato Nacional de Fútbol
- Dates: 18 March 1972 – 21 December 1972
- Champions: Colo-Colo (11th title)
- Relegated: Everton
- 1973 Copa Libertadores: Colo-Colo; Unión Española
- Matches: 306
- Goals: 875 (2.86 per match)
- Top goalscorer: Fernando Espinoza (25 goals)
- Biggest home win: Colo-Colo 8–0 Rangers (11 November)
- Highest attendance: 73,636 Universidad de Chile 3–0 Colo-Colo (18 November)
- Total attendance: 3,617,223
- Average attendance: 11,821

The 1972 Campeonato Nacional de Fútbol Profesional, was the 40st season of top-flight football in Chile. Colo-Colo won their eleventh title following a 1–1 draw against Huachipato in the championship 33rd matchday on December 16, 1972, also qualifying to the 1973 Copa Libertadores.

== League table ==
| Pos | Team | Pld | W | D | L | GF | GA | GD | Pts | Qualification or relegation |
|---|---|---|---|---|---|---|---|---|---|---|
| 1 | Colo-Colo (C) | 34 | 23 | 6 | 5 | 90 | 37 | +53 | 52 | Qualified to the 1973 Copa Libertadores |
| 2 | Unión Española | 34 | 20 | 9 | 5 | 48 | 20 | +28 | 49 | Qualified to the 1973 Copa Libertadores |
| 3 | Universidad de Chile | 34 | 19 | 8 | 7 | 72 | 38 | +34 | 46 | |
| 4 | Deportes Concepción | 34 | 16 | 11 | 7 | 48 | 31 | +17 | 43 | |
| 5 | Green Cross Temuco | 34 | 15 | 13 | 6 | 55 | 43 | +12 | 43 | |
| 6 | Deportes La Serena | 34 | 14 | 11 | 9 | 52 | 41 | +11 | 39 | |
| 7 | Universidad Católica | 34 | 14 | 11 | 9 | 42 | 41 | +1 | 39 | |
| 8 | Magallanes | 34 | 13 | 11 | 10 | 62 | 54 | +8 | 37 | |
| 9 | Huachipato | 34 | 13 | 11 | 10 | 40 | 32 | +8 | 37 | |
| 10 | Naval | 34 | 12 | 7 | 15 | 45 | 52 | −7 | 31 | |
| 11 | Lota Schwager | 34 | 9 | 12 | 13 | 40 | 52 | −12 | 30 | |
| 12 | O'Higgins | 34 | 8 | 10 | 16 | 45 | 54 | −9 | 26 | |
| 13 | Unión La Calera | 34 | 8 | 8 | 18 | 45 | 62 | −17 | 24 | |
| 14 | Santiago Wanderers | 34 | 8 | 8 | 18 | 36 | 59 | −23 | 24 | |
| 15 | Antofagasta Portuario | 34 | 10 | 4 | 20 | 42 | 66 | −24 | 24 | |
| 16 | Rangers | 34 | 8 | 8 | 18 | 32 | 62 | −30 | 24 | |
| 17 | Unión San Felipe | 34 | 9 | 5 | 20 | 44 | 64 | −20 | 23 | |
| 18 | Everton | 34 | 7 | 7 | 20 | 36 | 66 | −30 | 21 | Relegated to 1973 Segunda División de Chile |

(C) Champions

== Results ==
| Home \ Away | ANT | COL | CON | EVE | GCT | HUA | DLS | LOT | MAG | NAV | OHI | RAN | USF | ULC | UCA | UCH | UES | SWA |
|---|---|---|---|---|---|---|---|---|---|---|---|---|---|---|---|---|---|---|
| Antofagasta | | 0–2 | 2–1 | 2–3 | 1–1 | 0–2 | 2–1 | 0–0 | 2–1 | 2–1 | 1–0 | 1–2 | 1–2 | 0–1 | 0–1 | 2–1 | 0–1 | 4–1 |
| Colo-Colo | 4–3 | | 0–1 | 6–0 | 3–0 | 4–2 | 3–3 | 4–1 | 5–0 | 4–2 | 3–0 | 8–0 | 3–1 | 3–1 | 3–2 | 3–1 | 0–0 | 2–3 |
| Concepción | 1–0 | 1–1 | | 3–0 | 2–0 | 1–0 | 4–1 | 0–0 | 1–1 | 0–0 | 3–1 | 1–0 | 0–1 | 4–1 | 1–1 | 1–1 | 1–2 | 1–1 |
| Everton | 2–1 | 0–1 | 1–3 | | 2–2 | 2–3 | 1–2 | 0–1 | 0–2 | 0–2 | 3–1 | 1–1 | 2–3 | 1–0 | 1–1 | 1–2 | 2–1 | 1–1 |
| Green Cross T. | 1–0 | 1–4 | 2–0 | 3–0 | | 0–0 | 3–1 | 2–1 | 3–3 | 2–2 | 1–1 | 1–1 | 1–0 | 3–1 | 1–0 | 1–0 | 0–0 | 2–0 |
| Huachipato | 4–0 | 1–1 | 3–0 | 3–2 | 1–2 | | 0–0 | 0–2 | 2–0 | 1–1 | 3–1 | 2–1 | 2–0 | 1–1 | 2–0 | 1–1 | 1–0 | 1–0 |
| La Serena | 5–1 | 1–1 | 0–0 | 1–0 | 3–3 | 2–0 | | 0–0 | 1–2 | 2–1 | 2–2 | 2–0 | 4–1 | 1–0 | 0–0 | 3–1 | 1–1 | 5–0 |
| Lota S. | 1–1 | 2–1 | 3–3 | 3–1 | 1–1 | 0–0 | 1–3 | | 0–3 | 2–0 | 2–0 | 2–0 | 3–1 | 2–2 | 0–0 | 0–0 | 0–1 | 1–2 |
| Magallanes | 5–3 | 1–5 | 3–3 | 1–2 | 2–1 | 1–1 | 3–0 | 2–2 | | 2–3 | 1–0 | 0–1 | 4–2 | 5–1 | 2–1 | 1–3 | 1–1 | 1–1 |
| Naval | 2–1 | 0–2 | 1–2 | 1–0 | 3–2 | 1–1 | 0–0 | 1–0 | 0–2 | | 1–4 | 1–0 | 3–0 | 3–1 | 3–2 | 0–1 | 0–1 | 1–2 |
| O'Higgins | 1–2 | 0–1 | 0–1 | 1–1 | 1–1 | 2–1 | 0–1 | 3–2 | 2–2 | 2–4 | | 7–2 | 2–1 | 2–2 | 0–1 | 3–1 | 0–0 | 3–2 |
| Rangers | 1–3 | 1–3 | 0–1 | 1–1 | 1–4 | 1–2 | 1–0 | 1–1 | 1–1 | 0–2 | 0–0 | | 3–0 | 0–1 | 1–1 | 2–1 | 1–1 | 2–0 |
| San Felipe | 3–1 | 1–3 | 1–0 | 3–1 | 2–3 | 2–0 | 0–1 | 5–3 | 0–1 | 1–1 | 3–0 | 3–4 | | 0–2 | 1–2 | 0–0 | 0–2 | 1–1 |
| La Calera | 2–2 | 0–1 | 2–3 | 1–2 | 1–1 | 1–1 | 3–0 | 1–2 | 3–2 | 4–1 | 0–1 | 0–1 | 4–2 | | 1–2 | 0–2 | 0–2 | 2–2 |
| U. Católica | 1–2 | 2–1 | 0–0 | 4–1 | 0–5 | 1–0 | 2–1 | 1–1 | 0–0 | 0–0 | 3–2 | 4–0 | 1–1 | 3–3 | | 0–3 | 1–0 | 2–0 |
| U. de Chile | 6–2 | 3–0 | 2–2 | 4–2 | 5–0 | 1–0 | 2–2 | 5–2 | 2–2 | 3–2 | 2–2 | 3–1 | 2–1 | 4–0 | 4–0 | | 0–2 | 3–0 |
| U. Española | 3–1 | 2–2 | 1–0 | 2–0 | 1–1 | 1–0 | 2–0 | 6–2 | 2–1 | 2–0 | 1–1 | 2–1 | 2–0 | 3–1 | 0–1 | 0–1 | | 1–0 |
| S. Wanderers | 3–0 | 1–3 | 0–3 | 0–0 | 0–1 | 0–0 | 1–3 | 2–0 | 4–1 | 4–2 | 3–0 | 2–0 | 2–2 | 0–2 | 1–2 | 0–2 | 0–2 | |

Legend: Blue = home team win; Yellow = draw; Red = away team win.

== Top goalscorers ==
| Rank | Name | Club | Goals |
|---|---|---|---|
| 1 | (Chile) Fernando Espinoza | Magallanes | 25 |
| 2 | (Chile) Francisco Valdés | Colo-Colo | 23 |
| 3 | (Argentina) Juan Carlos Sarnari | Universidad de Chile | 19 |
| 4 | (Chile) Rogelio Farías | Unión Española | 15 |
| 5 | (Chile) Carlos Caszely | Colo-Colo | 14 |
