= Héctor Martínez (footballer, born 1947) =

Argentine footballer

Personal information
- Full name: Héctor Jesús Martínez
- Date of birth: 30 September 1947 (age 79)
- Position: Midfielder

Senior career*
Years	Team	Apps	(Gls)
1967	Baltimore Bays	7	(0)
1968	Washington Darts		
1969	Baltimore Bays		
1969–1972	Newell's Old Boys	92	(4)
1972	Baltimore Bays		
1973	Independiente	17	(0)
1974	Huracán	16	(1)
- * Club domestic league appearances and goals

Héctor Jesús Martínez (born 30 September 1947) is an Argentine former footballer.

== See also ==
NASL stats
