= Miguel Ángel Raimondo =

Argentine footballer

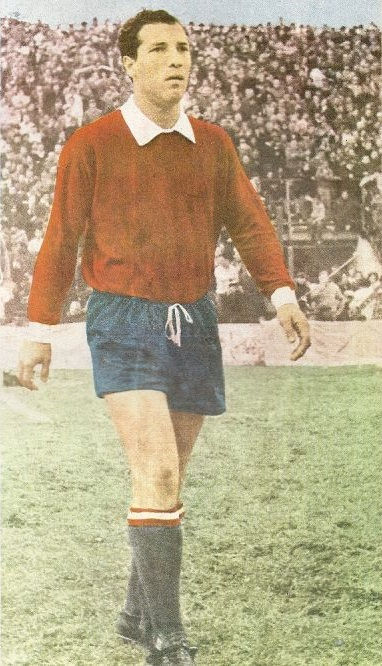

Personal information
- Full name: Miguel Ángel Raimondo
- Date of birth: 12 December 1943 (age 82)
- Place of birth: Rosario, Argentina
- Position: Midfielder

Senior career*
Years	Team	Apps	(Gls)
1965	Rosario Central	16	(0)
1966–1968	Atlanta	107	(5)
1969–1974	Independiente	219	(0)
1975	River Plate	42	(0)
1976	All Boys	30	(1)

International career
1970–1972	Argentina	10	(1)
- * Club domestic league appearances and goals

Miguel Ángel Raimondo (born 12 December 1943) is an Argentine football midfielder. He won ten trophies in his career, eight with Club Atlético Independiente and a further two with River Plate, he was awarded the Olimpia de Plata as the 1974 Argentine sports journalist's footballer of the year.

Raimondo played his first professional game for Rosario Central in the Primera Division Argentina in 1965. One year later he was transferred to Atlanta where he played until the end of the 1968 season.

Raimondo at Independiente in 1970.

In 1969, he joined Club Atlético Independiente, it was with Independiente that he had most of his success as a player, while he was there the club won two league championships, three (of their four in a row) Copa Libertadores titles, two Copa Interamericanas and an Intercontinental Cup.

Raimondo was selected as the Player of the Year of Argentina in 1974.

In 1975 Raimondo joined River Plate, he was only with the club for one season but in that time he helped the club to win both of the Argentine league titles that year.

In 1976 Raimondo joined All Boys, the club finished bottom of their group in both the Nacional and the Metropolitano championships, prompting Raimondo's retirement from football at the end of the season.

== Honours ==
Independiente

- Primera Division Argentina: Metropolitano 1970, Metropolitano 1971
- Copa Libertadores: 1972, 1973, 1974
- Copa Interamericana: 1973, 1974
- Intercontinental Cup: 1973

River Plate

- Primera Division Argentina: Metropolitano 1975, Nacional 1975
