= Luis Garisto =

Uruguayan footballer and coach (1945–2017)

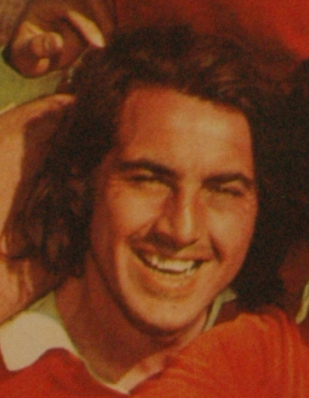

Personal information
- Full name: Luis Garisto Pan
- Date of birth: 3 December 1945
- Place of birth: Montevideo, Uruguay
- Date of death: 21 November 2017 (aged 71)
- Place of death: Montevideo, Uruguay

International career
Years	Team	Apps	(Gls)
- Uruguay

Luis Garisto Pan (3 December 1945 – 21 November 2017) was a Uruguayan football (soccer) coach who had a professional career as both player and head coach.

Luis Garisto began his sporting career in 1962, in his native Uruguay, playing for teams such as Racing Club de Montevideo, Defensor Sporting and Sud América.

He went to Independiente de Argentina, winning several local titles and, above all, two Libertadores Cups and an Inter-American Cup.

He returned to Uruguay, playing for Peñarol, again winning local titles, and finally finished his career in Chile, playing for Cobreloa.

In 1974, Garisto punched Australian international Ray Baartz in the throat and jaw during a friendly fixture at the Sydney Cricket Ground, prematurely ending Baartz's playing career only months before Australia were to play in their first ever World Cup.

As a coach, he managed in Uruguay, Argentina, Mexico and Chile, highlighting his work in several of these clubs, such as saving Banfield from relegation in 2002, and being champion with Cobreloa in the 2003 Clausura.

On 21 December 2003, Cobreloa, under the technical direction of Garisto, defeated Colo-Colo at the Monumental Stadium, becoming the only team to have won the championship there.

He died on 21 November 2017, at the age of 71.
