= Alejandro Semenewicz =

Argentine footballer (1949–2024)

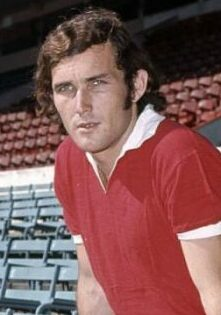
- Semenewicz in 1973

Personal information
- Full name: Alejandro Estanislao Semenewicz
- Date of birth: 1 June 1949
- Place of birth: Buenos Aires, Argentina
- Date of death: 1 April 2024 (aged 74)
- Place of death: Villa Domínico, Argentina
- Positions: Defender; midfielder

Senior career*
Years	Team	Apps	(Gls)
1968–1969	Morón	51	(0)
1970–1976	Independiente	220	(4)
1977–1979	Atlético Nacional		
1980	Cipolletti	11	(0)
1981–1982	Morón	69	(1)

International career
1972	Argentina	7	(0)
- * Club domestic league appearances and goals

Alejandro Estanislao Semenewicz, (also spelled Siemianowicz, 1 June 1949 – 1 April 2024) was an Argentine professional footballer who played as a defender or midfielder.

== Career ==
Semenewicz was nicknamed "El Polaco". He is considered to be one of the most decorated players in the history of Argentine side Independiente.

== Style of play ==
Semenewicz mainly operated as a defender or midfielder and was known for his work ethic.

== Personal life and death ==
Born in Argentina, Semenewicz was of Polish descent. His nickname was El polaco (The Pole).

Semenewicz died of a heart attack on 1 April 2024, at the age of 74.
