= Miguel Ángel Santoro =

Argentine footballer

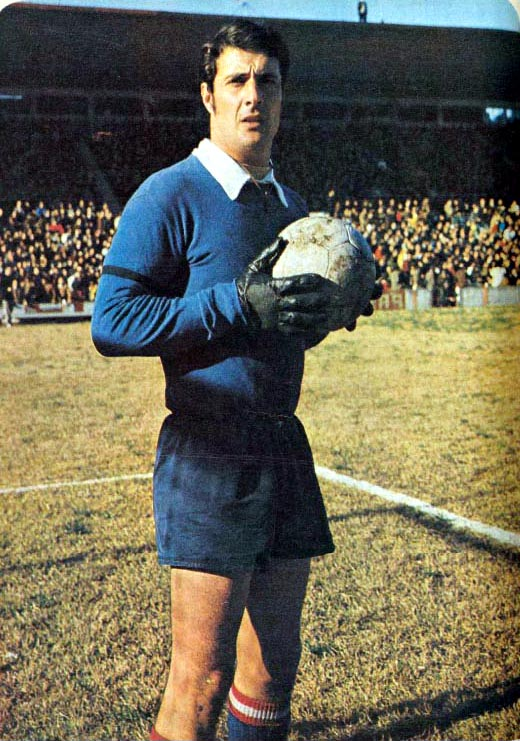
- Santoro with Independiente in 1973

Personal information
- Full name: Miguel Ángel Santoro Marcote
- Date of birth: 27 February 1942 (age 84)
- Place of birth: Sarandí, Argentina
- Position: Goalkeeper

Senior career*
Years	Team	Apps	(Gls)
1962–1974	Independiente	343	(0)
1974–1977	Hércules	50	(0)
Total		393	(0)

International career
	Argentina	14	(0)

Managerial career
- 1980: Independiente
- 2001: Independiente
- 2005: Independiente
- 2008–2009: Independiente
- * Club domestic league appearances and goals

In this Spanish name, the first or paternal surname is Santoro and the second or maternal family name is Marcote.

Miguel Ángel Santoro Marcote (born 27 February 1942) is a retired Argentine football goalkeeper. He played most of his career for Club Atlético Independiente and represented the Argentina national football team at the 1974 World Cup.

== Playing career ==
Santoro was born in Sarandí, Argentina. He made 343 appearances for Independiente between 1962 and 1974, making him the goalkeeper with the highest number of appearances for the club. During his time with Independiente, he won 10 titles, 4 league, 4 Copa Libertadores, the Copa Intercontinental and the Copa Interamericana.

After representing Argentina at the 1974 World Cup, Santoro was sold to Spanish side Hércules, where he played until his retirement in 1977.

== Managerial career ==
Santoro has had three short spells as manager of Independiente, his record as manager of the first team is Played 36, Won 12, Drawn 14, Lost 10.

He joined Independiente on 5 October 2008 and stepped down as manager of Independiente on 22 March 2009.

== Honours ==
Independiente

- Primera División Argentina: 1963, Nacional 1967, Metropolitano 1970, Metropolitano 1971
- Copa Libertadores: 1964, 1965, 1972, 1973
- Intercontinental Cup: 1973
- Copa Interamericana: 1973
