= 1973 Copa Libertadores =

14th season of Copa Libertadores

1973 Copa Libertadores de América
Tournament details
- Dates: February 2 – July 6
- Teams: 19 (from 9 associations)

Final positions
- Champions: (Argentina) Independiente (4th title)
- Runners-up: (Chile) Colo-Colo

Tournament statistics
- Matches played: 65
- Goals scored: 187 (2.88 per match)
- Top scorer: (Chile) Carlos Caszely (9 goals)

The 1973 Copa Libertadores was won by defending champions Independiente of Argentina after defeating Colo Colo of Chile in a third decisive game. The third match which ended 2–1 in extra time was necessary after the previous two leg matches ended in draws. Their second consecutive title made Independiente the first team in the tournament's history to win four titles.

The Venezuelan club teams Deportivo Italia and Deportivo Galicia did not participate in the Copa Libertadores due to internal problems with the Venezuelan Football Federation.

== Qualified teams ==
Country	Team	Qualification method
CONMEBOL (1 berth)	Independiente	1972 Copa Libertadores champion
Argentina (2 berths)	San Lorenzo	1972 Nacional champion
Argentina (2 berths)	River Plate	1972 Nacional runner-up
Bolivia (2 berths)	Jorge Wilstermann	1972 Primera División champion
Bolivia (2 berths)	Oriente Petrolero	1972 Primera División runner-up
Brazil (2 berths)	Palmeiras	1972 Campeonato Brasileiro Série A champion
Brazil (2 berths)	Botafogo	1972 Campeonato Brasileiro Série A runner-up
Chile (2 berths)	Colo-Colo	1972 Primera División champion
Chile (2 berths)	Unión Española	1972 Primera División runner-up
Colombia (2 berths)	Millonarios	1972 Campeonato Profesional champion
Colombia (2 berths)	Deportivo Cali	1972 Campeonato Profesional runner-up
Ecuador (2 berths)	Emelec	1972 Campeonato Ecuatoriano champion
Ecuador (2 berths)	El Nacional	1972 Campeonato Ecuatoriano runner-up
Paraguay (2 berths)	Cerro Porteño	1972 Primera División champion
Paraguay (2 berths)	Olimpia	1972 Primera División runner-up
Peru (2 berths)	Sporting Cristal	1972 Primera División champion
Peru (2 berths)	Universitario	1972 Primera División runner-up
Uruguay (2 berths)	Nacional	1972 Primera División champion
Uruguay (2 berths)	Peñarol	1972 Primera División runner-up

== Draw ==
The champions and runners-up of each football association were drawn into the same group along with another football association's participating teams. Three clubs from Argentina competed as Independiente was champion of the 1972 Copa Libertadores. They entered the tournament in the Semifinals.

Group 1	Group 2	Group 3	Group 4	Group 5
Argentina; Bolivia	Brazil; Uruguay	Chile; Ecuador	Colombia	Paraguay; Peru

== Group stage ==
=== Group 1 ===
Pos	Team	Pld	W	D	L	GF	GA	GD	Pts	Qualification	(Argentina) SLO	(Bolivia) WIL	(Argentina) RIV	(Bolivia) ORI
1	(Argentina) San Lorenzo	6	5	0	1	15	1	+14	10	Semifinals	—	3–0	1–0	4–0
2	(Bolivia) Jorge Wilstermann	6	3	1	2	6	8	−2	7		1–0	—	1–0	1–0
3	(Argentina) River Plate	6	2	1	3	12	10	+2	5		0–4	2–2	—	7–1
4	(Bolivia) Oriente Petrolero	6	1	0	5	5	19	−14	2		0–3	3–1	1–3	—

Source: worldfootball.net

=== Group 2 ===
Pos	Team	Pld	W	D	L	GF	GA	GD	Pts	Qualification	(Brazil) BOT	(Brazil) PAL	(Uruguay) NAC	(Uruguay) PEÑ
1	(Brazil) Botafogo	6	4	1	1	15	9	+6	9 (Note: Botafogo won the first-place playoff 2–1 against Palmeiras at the Maracanã Stadium on 29 March after both teams finished level on points.)	Semifinals	—	2–0	3–2	4–1
2	(Brazil) Palmeiras	6	4	1	1	10	6	+4	9		3–2	—	1–1	2–0
3	(Uruguay) Nacional	6	1	2	3	8	9	−1	4		1–2	1–2	—	2–0
4	(Uruguay) Peñarol	6	0	2	4	4	13	−9	2		2–2	0–2	1–1	—

Source: worldfootball.net

=== Group 3 ===
Pos	Team	Pld	W	D	L	GF	GA	GD	Pts	Qualification	(Chile) COL	(Ecuador) EME	(Ecuador) NAC	(Chile) UES
1	(Chile) Colo-Colo	6	3	2	1	16	4	+12	8	Semifinals	—	5–1	5–1	5–0
2	(Ecuador) Emelec	6	3	1	2	6	7	−1	7		1–0	—	2–0	1–0
3	(Ecuador) El Nacional	6	2	1	3	5	10	−5	5		1–1	1–0	—	1–0
4	(Chile) Unión Española	6	1	2	3	3	9	−6	4		0–0	1–1	2–1	—

Source: worldfootball.net

=== Group 4 ===
Pos	Team	Pld	W	D	L	GF	GA	GD	Pts	Qualification	(Colombia) MIL	(Colombia) CAL
1	(Colombia) Millonarios	2	1	1	0	6	2	+4	3	Semifinals	—	6–2
2	(Colombia) Deportivo Cali	2	0	1	1	2	6	−4	1		0–0	—

Source: worldfootball.net

=== Group 5 ===
Pos	Team	Pld	W	D	L	GF	GA	GD	Pts	Qualification	(Paraguay) CER	(Paraguay) OLI	(Peru) SCR	(Peru) UNI
1	(Paraguay) Cerro Porteño	6	4	1	1	14	5	+9	9	Semifinals	—	4–2	5–0	1–0
2	(Paraguay) Olimpia	6	3	0	3	9	9	0	6		2–1	—	1–0	3–1
3	(Peru) Sporting Cristal	6	2	2	2	5	9	−4	6		1–1	1–0	—	2–2
4	(Peru) Universitario	6	1	1	4	5	10	−5	3		0–2	2–1	0–1	—

Source: worldfootball.net

== Semi-finals ==
The five previous group leaders formed two new groups of three which included the 1972 Copa Libertadores defending champion Independiente.

=== Group 1 ===
Pos	Team	Pld	W	D	L	GF	GA	GD	Pts	Qualification or relegation	(Argentina) IND	(Argentina) SLO	(Colombia) MIL
1	(Argentina) Independiente	4	2	1	1	5	3	+2	5	Qualified to the Final	—	1–0	2–0
2	(Argentina) San Lorenzo	4	1	2	1	4	3	+1	4		2–2	—	2–0
3	(Colombia) Millonarios	4	1	1	2	1	4	−3	3		1–0	0–0	—

Source: worldfootball.net

=== Group 2 ===
Pos	Team	Pld	W	D	L	GF	GA	GD	Pts	Qualification or relegation	(Chile) COL	(Paraguay) CER	(Brazil) BOT
1	(Chile) Colo-Colo	4	2	1	1	10	9	+1	5	Qualified to the Final	—	4–0	3–3
2	(Paraguay) Cerro Porteño	4	2	0	2	8	9	−1	4		5–1	—	3–2
3	(Brazil) Botafogo	4	1	1	2	8	8	0	3		1–2	2–0	—

Source: worldfootball.net

== Finals ==
=== First leg ===
22 May 1973	Independiente (Argentina)	1–1	(Chile) Colo-Colo	Avellaneda

=== Second leg ===
29 May 1973	Colo-Colo (Chile)	0–0	(Argentina) Independiente	Santiago

=== Extra match ===
6 June 1973	Independiente (Argentina)	2–1	(Chile) Colo-Colo	Montevideo

== Champion ==
Copa Libertadores
1973 Winners

Independiente
Fourth Title
