= 1972 Copa Libertadores =

13th season of Copa Libertadores

1972 Copa Libertadores de América 1972 Copa Libertadores da América

Tournament details
- Dates: January 30 – May 24
- Teams: 20 (from 10 confederations)

Final positions
- Champions: (Argentina) Independiente (3rd title)
- Runners-up: (Peru) Universitario

Tournament statistics
- Matches played: 68
- Goals scored: 175 (2.57 per match)
- Top scorer(s): (Peru) Oswaldo Ramírez (6) (Peru) Percy Rojas (6) (Peru) Teófilo Cubillas (6) (Brazil) Toninho (6)

The 1972 Copa Libertadores was the 13th edition of the Copa Libertadores, CONMEBOL's the annual club tournament. Independiente of Argentina defeated Universitario de Deportes of Peru in the finals, and became the second team in the tournament's history to win three titles, after fellow Argentine club Estudiantes. They would go on and face the winner of the 1971–72 European Cup in the Intercontinental Cup.

== Format ==
The tournament was divided into three phases. The first phase had 19 teams divided into four round-robin groups of four and one group of three (defending champions Nacional received a bye to the second phase). Each group had clubs from two countries. The winners of each group advanced to the second phase. Five teams joined the defending champions in two round-robin groups of three. The winners of each group advanced to play in the finals. The winner of the finals, and tournament champions, are determined by points (two for a win, one for tie).

== Qualified teams ==
Country	Team	Qualify method
Argentina; 2 berths	Independiente	1971 Metropolitan Championship winners
Argentina; 2 berths	Rosario Central	1971 National Championship winners
Bolivia; 2 berths	Oriente Petrolero	1971 Copa Simón Bolívar winners
Bolivia; 2 berths	Chaco Petrolero	1971 Copa Simón Bolívar runners-up
Brazil; 2 berth	Atlético Mineiro	1971 Campeonato Brasileiro winners
Brazil; 2 berth	São Paulo	1971 Campeonato Brasileiro runners-up
Chile; 2 berths	Unión San Felipe	1971 Primera División winners
Chile; 2 berths	Universidad de Chile	1971 Primera División runners-up
Colombia; 2 berths	Santa Fe	1971 Campeonato Profesional winners
Colombia; 2 berths	Atlético Nacional	1971 Campeonato Profesional runners-up
Ecuador; 2 berths	Barcelona	1971 Ecuadorian league winners
Ecuador; 2 berths	América de Quito	1971 Ecuadorian league runners-up
Paraguay; 2 berths	Cerro Porteño	1971 Primera División winners
Paraguay; 2 berths	Olimpia	1971 Primera División runners-up
Peru; 2 berths	Universitario	1971 Torneo Descentralizado winners
Peru; 2 berths	Alianza Lima	1971 Torneo Descentralizado runners-up
Uruguay; 1+1 berth	Nacional	1971 Copa Libertadores champions
Uruguay; 1+1 berth	Peñarol	1971 Primera División runners-up
Venezuela; 2 berths	Valencia	1971 Venezuelan Primera División winners
Venezuela; 2 berths	Deportivo Italia	1971 Venezuelan Primera División runners-up

== Draw ==
The champions and runners-up of each football association were drawn into the same group along with another football association's participating teams. Two clubs from Uruguay competed as Nacional was champion of the 1971 Copa Libertadores. They entered the tournament in the Semifinals.

Group 1	Group 2	Group 3	Group 4	Group 5
Argentina; Colombia	Bolivia; Ecuador	Brazil; Paraguay	Chile; Peru	Uruguay; Venezuela

== Group Stage ==
=== Group 1 ===
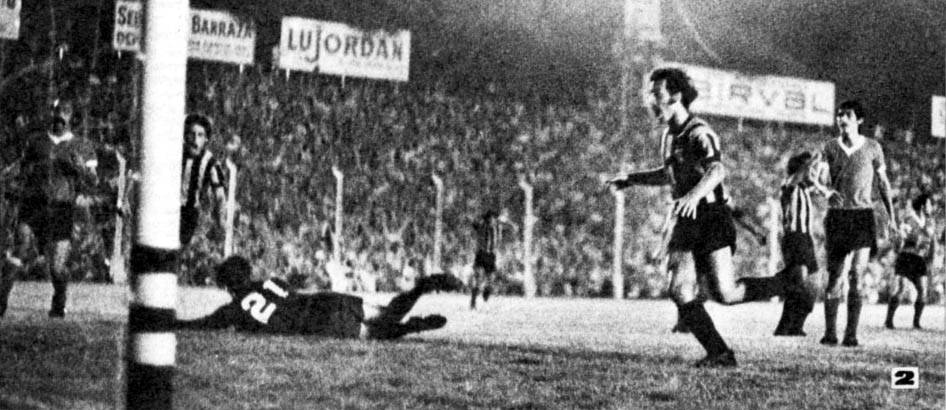
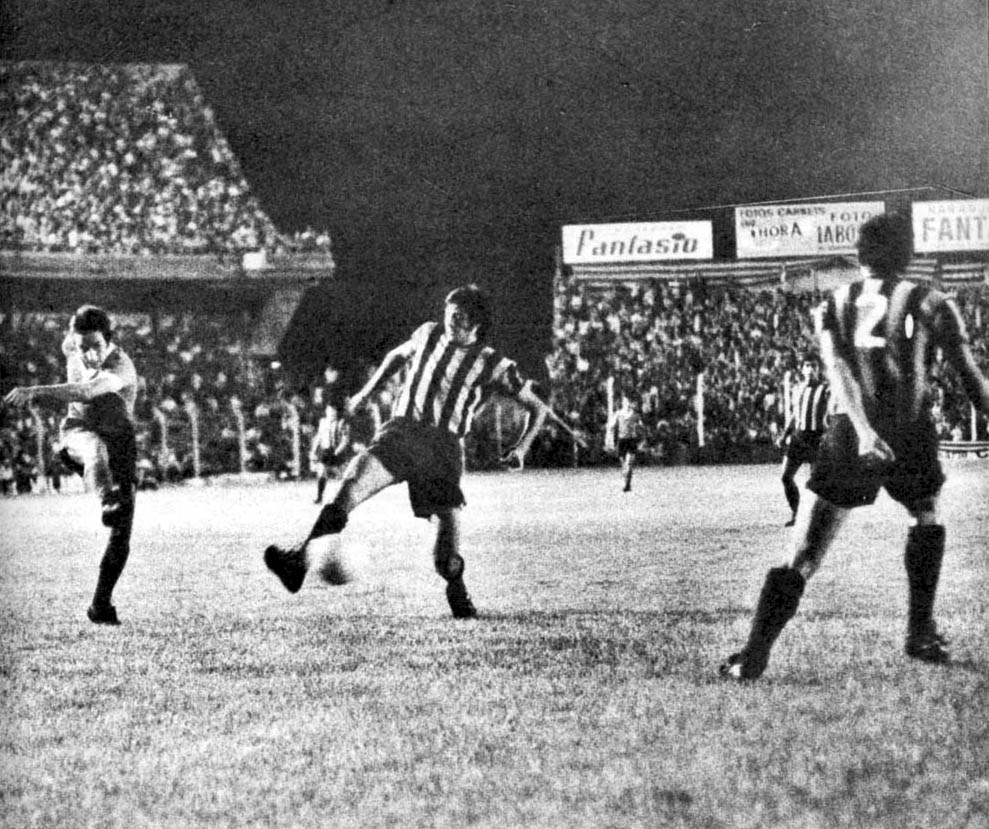
Rosario Central v Independiente match, 2–2 in Rosario

Pos	Team	Pld	W	D	L	GF	GA	GD	Pts	Qualification or relegation	(Argentina) IND	(Argentina) ROC	(Colombia) SF	(Colombia) NAC
1	(Argentina) Independiente	6	4	2	0	13	5	+8	10	Qualified to the Semifinals		2–0	2–0	2–0
2	(Argentina) Rosario Central	6	3	2	1	8	5	+3	8		2–2		2–0	3–1
3	(Colombia) Santa Fe	6	1	2	3	4	9	−5	4		2–4	0–0		1–1
4	(Colombia) Atlético Nacional	6	0	2	4	3	9	−6	2		1–1	0–1	0–1	

Legend: Blue = home team win; Yellow = draw; Red = away team win.

=== Group 2 ===
Pos	Team	Pld	W	D	L	GF	GA	GD	Pts	Qualification or relegation	(Ecuador) BAR	(Ecuador) AME	(Bolivia) ORI	(Bolivia) CHA
1	(Ecuador) Barcelona	6	3	3	0	8	3	+5	9	Qualified to the Semifinals		2–1	1–1	3–0
2	(Ecuador) América de Quito	6	3	1	2	9	7	+2	7		0–0		3–0	1–0
3	(Bolivia) Oriente Petrolero	6	2	2	2	10	7	+3	6		0–0	4–2		5–0
4	(Bolivia) Chaco Petrolero	6	1	0	5	3	13	−10	2		1–2	1–2	1–0	

Legend: Blue = home team win; Yellow = draw; Red = away team win.

=== Group 3 ===
Pos	Team	Pld	W	D	L	GF	GA	GD	Pts	Qualification or relegation	(Brazil) SÃO	(Paraguay) CER	(Paraguay) OLI	(Brazil) MIN
1	(Brazil) São Paulo	6	3	2	1	12	6	+6	8	Qualified to the Semifinals		4–0	3–1	0–0
2	(Paraguay) Cerro Porteño	6	2	2	2	7	11	−4	6		3–2		1–3	1–0
3	(Paraguay) Olimpia	6	2	2	2	7	8	−1	6		0–1	1–1		2–2 (Note: The game was suspended at 2–2 because Atlético Mineiro was left with six players.)
4	(Brazil) Atlético Mineiro	6	0	4	2	5	6	−1	4		2–2	1–1	0–0	

Legend: Blue = home team win; Yellow = draw; Red = away team win.

=== Group 4 ===
Pos	Team	Pld	W	D	L	GF	GA	GD	Pts	Qualification or relegation	(Peru) UNI	(Chile) UCH	(Peru) ALI	(Chile) USF
1	(Peru) Universitario	6	3	2	1	9	6	+3	8	Qualified to the Semifinals		2–1	2–1	3–1
2	Universidad de Chile	6	3	0	3	12	12	0	6		1–0		2–3	2–1
3	(Peru) Alianza Lima	6	2	2	2	10	10	0	6		2–2	3–4		1–0
4	(Chile) Unión San Felipe	6	1	2	3	5	8	−3	4		0–0	3–2	0–0	

Legend: Blue = home team win; Yellow = draw; Red = away team win.

=== Group 5 ===
Pos	Team	Pld	W	D	L	GF	GA	GD	Pts	Qualification or relegation	(Uruguay) PEÑ	(Venezuela) ITA	(Venezuela) VAL
1	(Uruguay) Peñarol	4	4	0	0	12	3	+9	8	Qualified to the Semifinals		5–1	4–1
2	(Venezuela) Deportivo Italia	4	1	1	2	4	7	−3	3		0–1		2–0
3	(Venezuela) Valencia	4	0	1	3	3	9	−6	1		1–2	1–1	

Legend: Blue = home team win; Yellow = draw; Red = away team win.

== Semifinals ==
=== Group A ===
Pos	Team	Pld	W	D	L	GF	GA	GD	Pts	Qualification or relegation	(Peru) UNI	(Uruguay) NAC	(Uruguay) PEÑ
1	(Peru) Universitario	4	1	2	1	9	7	+2	4	Qualified to the Final		3–0	2–3
2	(Uruguay) Nacional	4	1	2	1	7	7	0	4		3–3		1–1
3	(Uruguay) Peñarol	4	1	2	1	5	7	−2	4		1–1	0–3	

Legend: Blue = home team win; Yellow = draw; Red = away team win.

=== Group B ===
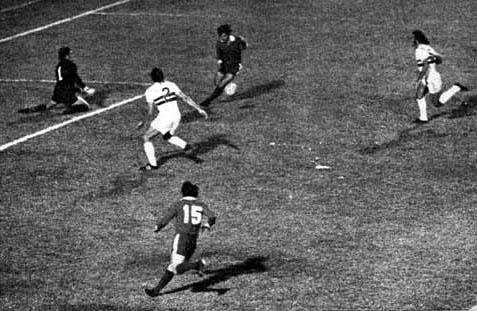
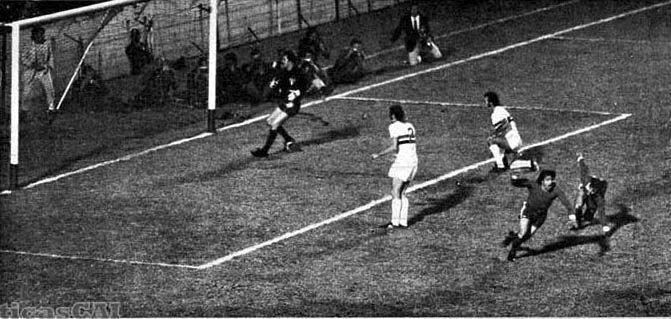
Independiente (2) v Sao Paulo (0) in Avellaneda

Pos	Team	Pld	W	D	L	GF	GA	GD	Pts	Qualification or relegation	(Argentina) IND	(Brazil) SÃO	(Ecuador) BAR
1	(Argentina) Independiente	4	2	1	1	4	2	+2	5	Qualified to the Final		2–0	1–0 (Note: Barcelona abandoned the match at that score; results stood.)
2	(Brazil) São Paulo	4	1	2	1	2	3	−1	4		1–0		1–1
3	(Ecuador) Barcelona	4	0	3	1	2	3	−1	3		1–1	0–0	

Legend: Blue = home team win; Yellow = draw; Red = away team win.

== Finals ==
Pos	Team	Pld	W	D	L	GF	GA	GD	Pts
1	(Argentina) Independiente	2	1	1	0	2	1	+1	3
2	(Peru) Universitario	2	0	1	1	1	2	−1	1

May 17, 1972

Universitario (Peru)	0 – 0	(Argentina) Independiente

Estadio Nacional
Lima, Peru
Attendance: 45,000
Referee: Marques (Brazil)

May 24, 1972

Independiente (Argentina)	2 – 1	(Peru) Universitario
Maglioni 6' 61'		Rojas 79'

La Doble Visera
Avellaneda, Argentina
Attendance: 55,000
Referee: Favilli Neto (Brazil)

== Champion ==
Copa Libertadores
1972 Champions
(Argentina)
Independiente
Third title
