= 1976 Copa Interamericana =

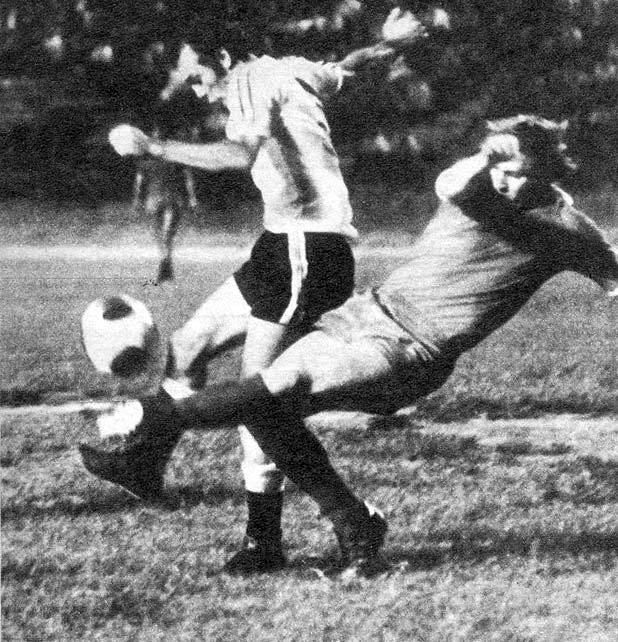
- Independiente player Enzo Trossero (right) goes for the ball in the second match
- Event: Copa Interamericana
Atlético Español	Independiente
(Mexico)	(Argentina)
2	2
- (tied on points and goal difference, Independiente won 4–2 on penalties)

First leg
Atlético Español	Independiente
2	2
- Date: August 26, 1976
- Venue: Estadio Olímpico, Caracas
- Referee: Mario Fiorenza (Venezuela)

Second leg
Independiente	Atlético Español
0	0
- Date: August 29, 1976
- Venue: Estadio Olímpico, Caracas
- Referee: Vicente Llobregat (Venezuela)

The 1976 Copa Interamericana was the 5th. edition of the Copa Interamericana. The final was contested by Argentine Club Atlético Independiente (champion of 1975 Copa Libertadores) and Mexico's Atlético Español (winner of 1975 CONCACAF Champions' Cup). The final was played under a two-leg format in August 1976. Both matches were held in Estadio Olímpico, Caracas, Venezuela.

In the first leg, both teams tied 2–2, while the second leg was also a tie, 0–0. As both teams equaled in points and goal difference, a penalty shoot-out was carried out to decide a champion. Independiente won 4–2 on penalties, therefore the Argentine team won their third and consecutive Interamericana trophy.

== Qualified teams ==
Team	Qualification	Previous app.
(Argentina) Independiente	1975 Copa Libertadores winner	**1972, 1974**
(Mexico) Atlético Español	1975 CONCACAF Champions' Cup winner	None

Bold indicates winning years

== Venue ==
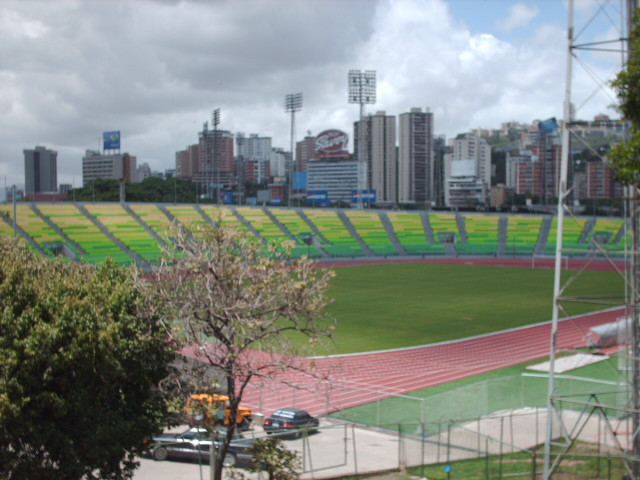
Estadio Olímpico of Caracas was the venue for both matches

Both games were held in Estadio Olímpico in the city of Caracas, Venezuela, after an agreement between both clubs. The matches were attended by a high number of fans due to the interest of Venezuelan people to see Independiente.

The stadium was a multi-use purpose venue, belonging to the Central University of Venezuela, designed by architect Carlos Raúl Villanueva, had been opened in 1951 as part of the creation of University City of Caracas, that would be declared a "World Heritage Site" by UNESCO in 2000. The stadium was inaugurated in the 1951 Bolivarian Games. The stadium also hosted matches of the Small Club World Cup between 1952 and 1963.

== Match details ==
=== First leg ===
1976 Copa Interamericana
August 26, 1976
First leg

Independiente (Argentina)	2–2	(Mexico) Atlético Español
Bochini 45'; Arroyo 80'	Report	Ramírez 44'; Borbolla 75'

Estadio Olímpico, Caracas
Referee: Mario Fiorenza (Venezuela)

GK	(Argentina) Carlos Gay
DF	(Peru) Eleazar Soria	(substituted off) 80'
DF	(Argentina) Hugo Villaverde
DF	(Argentina) Enzo Trossero
DF	(Uruguay) Ricardo Pavoni
MF	(Argentina) Alejandro Semenewicz
MF	(Argentina) Rubén Galván
MF	(Argentina) Ricardo Bochini
FW	(Argentina) Víctor Arroyo
FW	(Argentina) Daniel Astegiano	(substituted off) 7'
FW	(Argentina) Daniel Bertoni
Substitutes:
FW	(Peru) Percy Rojas	(substituted on) 7' (red card)
MF	(Argentina) José Antonio Lencina	(substituted on) 80'
Manager:
(Argentina) José Omar Pastoriza

GK	(Mexico) Moisés Camacho
DF	(Mexico) Gregorio Cortéz
DF	(Mexico) Jorge Arturo Candia
DF	(Mexico) Leonel Urbina
DF	(Mexico) Jaime García
MF	(Mexico) Roberto Martínez
MF	(Chile) Juan Rodríguez Vega
MF	(Spain) Benito Pardo
FW	(Mexico) Eugenio Rivas
FW	(Peru) Oswaldo Ramírez
FW	(Mexico) Juan Manuel Borbolla
Manager:
(Mexico) José A. Roca

=== Second leg ===
August 29, 1976
Second leg

Atlético Español (Mexico)	0–0	(Argentina) Independiente
	Report
Penalties
Ramírez (penalty scored); Rodríguez Vega (penalty missed); Rivero (penalty scored); Borbolla (penalty missed)	2–4	(penalty scored) Pavoni; (penalty scored) Bertoni; (penalty scored) Soria; (penalty scored) Arroyo

Estadio Olímpico, Caracas
Referee: Vicente Llobregat (Venezuela)

**At. Español**	**Independiente**

GK	(Mexico) Moisés Camacho
DF	(Mexico) Jorge Arturo Candia	(substituted off) a'
DF	(Mexico) Juan Álvarez
DF	(Chile) Juan Rodríguez Vega
DF	(Mexico) Ignacio Ramírez
MF	(Mexico) Leonel Urbina
MF	(Uruguay) Saúl Rivero
MF	(Spain) Benito Pardo
FW	(Mexico) Raúl Isiordia	(substituted off) b'
FW	(Peru) Oswaldo Ramírez
FW	(Mexico) Juan Manuel Borbolla
Substitutes:
	(Mexico) Jaime García	(substituted on) a'
	(Mexico) Eugenio Rivas	(substituted on) b'
Manager:
(Mexico) José A. Roca

GK	(Argentina) Carlos Gay
DF	(Peru) Eleazar Soria
DF	(Argentina) Hugo Villaverde
DF	(Argentina) Enzo Trossero
DF	(Uruguay) Ricardo Pavoni
MF	(Argentina) Alejandro Semenewicz
MF	(Argentina) Rubén Galván	(substituted off) 75'
MF	(Argentina) Oswaldo Carrica
FW	(Argentina) Víctor Arroyo
FW	(Argentina) César Brítez
FW	(Argentina) Daniel Bertoni
Substitutes:
MF	(Argentina) José Antonio Lencina	(substituted on) 75'
Manager:
(Argentina) José Omar Pastoriza
