= Ricardo Bochini =

Argentine footballer (born 1954)

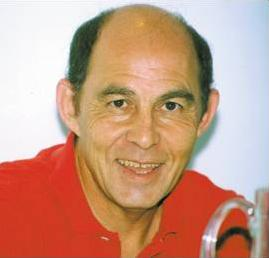
- Bochini in 2008

Personal information
- Full name: Ricardo Enrique Bochini
- Date of birth: 25 January 1954 (age 72)
- Place of birth: Zárate, Argentina
- Height: 1.68 m (5 ft 6 in)
- Position: Attacking midfielder

Youth career
- Belgrano de Zárate
- 1971–1972: Independiente

Senior career*
Years	Team	Apps	(Gls)
1972–1991	Independiente	634	(97)
2007	Sportivo Barracas Bolívar	1	(0)

International career
1973–1986	Argentina	28	(0)
Medal record
Men's football
Representing Argentina
FIFA World Cup
Winner	1986 Mexico
- * Club domestic league appearances and goals

Ricardo Enrique Bochini (born 25 January 1954) is an Argentine former professional footballer who played as an attacking midfielder. He is nicknamed El Bocha. He spent his nearly 20-year professional career at club Independiente, becoming one of the most emblematic players and the greatest idol in the history of the club. Bochini was a childhood idol of Argentine iconic footballer Diego Maradona.

In addition to winning the 1986 FIFA World Cup with the Argentina national team, Bochini won a total of 13 titles with Independiente – four Primera División championships and nine international competitions.

== Club career ==
As a boy, Bochini was wanted by Campana's club Villa Dálmine, but started playing football for Belgrano, a local club from his home city. At the age of 15, he went to Buenos Aires with his father to try to join San Lorenzo and later Boca Juniors. He was eventually accepted into the youth system of Independiente in 1971.

He made his professional debut in the Argentine Primera División on 25 June 1972, when Independiente's coach, Pedro Dellacha sent him onto the field in the 74th minute of a match that they lost 1–0 to River Plate.

On Saturday morning (the day prior to the match) I walked over [to] the senior squad's dress room and saw my name written on the chalkboard. I was cited for the match v. River Plate. I could not believe that, sincerely. I had always dreamed about my debut in Primera, but I was still very young.

— Bochini remembering his debut in Primera División

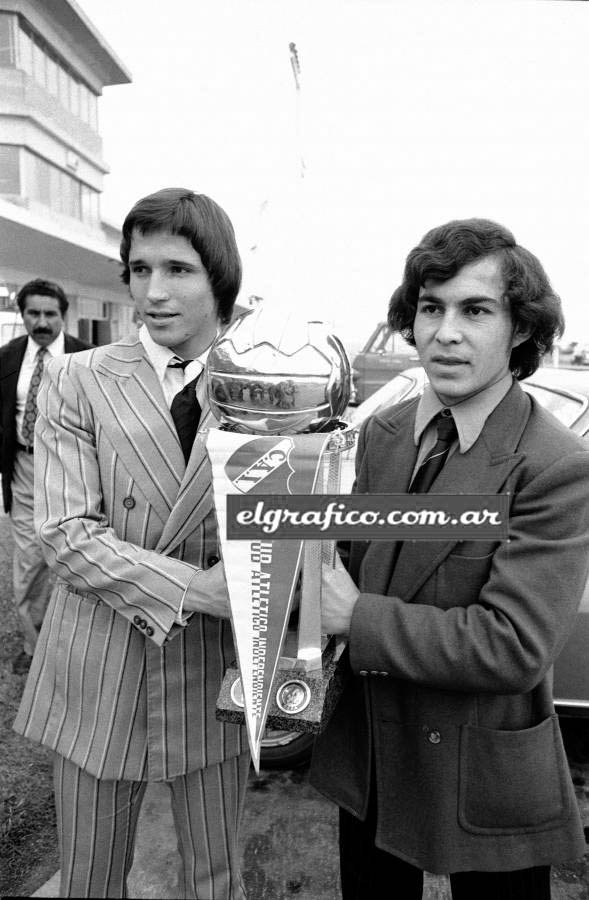
Bochini (right) and Daniel Bertoni with the Intercontinental Cup won in 1973

By that time Independiente had already won the 1972 Copa Libertadores, which allowed them to play the Intercontinental Cup that same year but Bochini was not part of the team that lost the tie to Ajax. He gained more participation the following year and was an important member of the team, alongside Daniel Bertoni. The team won the 1973 Copa Libertadores and the 1973 Intercontinental Cup; Bochini scored the only goal in the latter against Juventus.

The club managed to defend the Copa Libertadores title in 1974. São Paulo had won the first match of the final at Pacaembu stadium and Independiente the second one at their stadium (Bochini scored the first goal). The final had to go to a third match at the national stadium of Chile, where Ricardo Pavoni scored the only goal.

Independiente was to play the Intercontinental Cup in 1974 and 1975 against Bayern Munich but the German club declined both times. Atlético de Madrid, the 1973–74 European Cup's runners-up, played instead in 1974 and won the title. The Intercontinental Cup was not held in 1975.

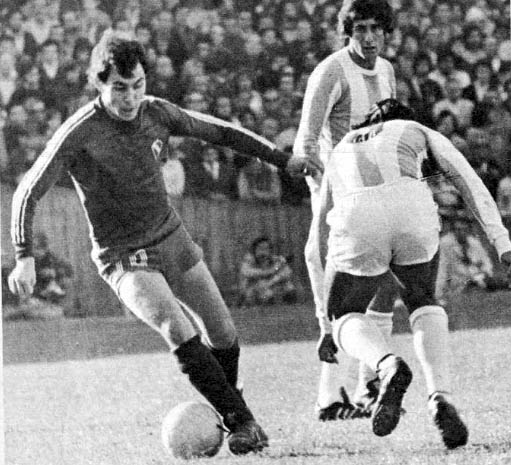
Bochini dribbling in an Avellaneda derby in 1976

In 1975 Bochini was conscripted into Military service and managed to also play football, but was not able to perform as well as desired. Nevertheless, he also won the 1975 Copa Libertadores with Independiente. It was Bochini's third title in a row and the club's fourth, being the only club to achieve this so far.

Bochini was also part of the team that won the Copa Interamericana in 1974 and 1975 against Municipal and Atlético Español respectively.

After finishing in the second position of the Metropolitano Championship in 1977, Bochini won his first national championship with Independiente that same year. He scored the last goal in the final against Talleres de Córdoba that gave them the title.

Bochini repeated the title with Independiente in 1978 winning the final against River Plate. After four years without any trophies, Independiente signed Jorge Burruchaga and José Percudani, who formed a celebrated attack with Bochini that helped the team win the 1983 Metropolitano Championship, the 1984 Copa Libertadores and the 1984 Intercontinental Cup against Liverpool.

At the end of his career, Bochini won the 1988–89 Argentine Primera División, this being his last title.

On 5 May 1991, Bochini played his last professional match against Estudiantes. He played a total of 634 league matches, scoring 97 goals. He is the player with the most appearances in the Argentine Primera División after goalkeeper Hugo Gatti, who played in 775 league matches.

== International career ==
Argentine coach César Menotti had selected Bochini several times in the 1970s, but eventually he lost his place for the 1978 FIFA World Cup to Norberto Alonso.

Bochini played again in the national team when Carlos Bilardo succeeded Menotti as coach, but lost his place to younger players such as Diego Maradona. Nevertheless, he was part of the squad that won the 1986 FIFA World Cup albeit he played only a few minutes in the semi-finals against Belgium, replacing Jorge Burruchaga.

== Playing style ==
Watching him play drove me crazy with delight.

— Diego Maradona

Although he was not a prolific goalscorer, he was considered one of the best playmakers of the 1980s, often making assists for teammates to score, due to his vision and accurate passing. Even after he retired, the expression pase bochinesco ("bochinesque pass") is used to refer to a precise pass made to a forward to leave him one on one against the goalkeeper, bypassing the opponent's defenders. Bochini became a master of 'la pausa', the moment when a number 10, poised to deliver a pass, delays a fraction, waiting for the player he is looking to feed to reach the ideal position.

== Post-retirement ==
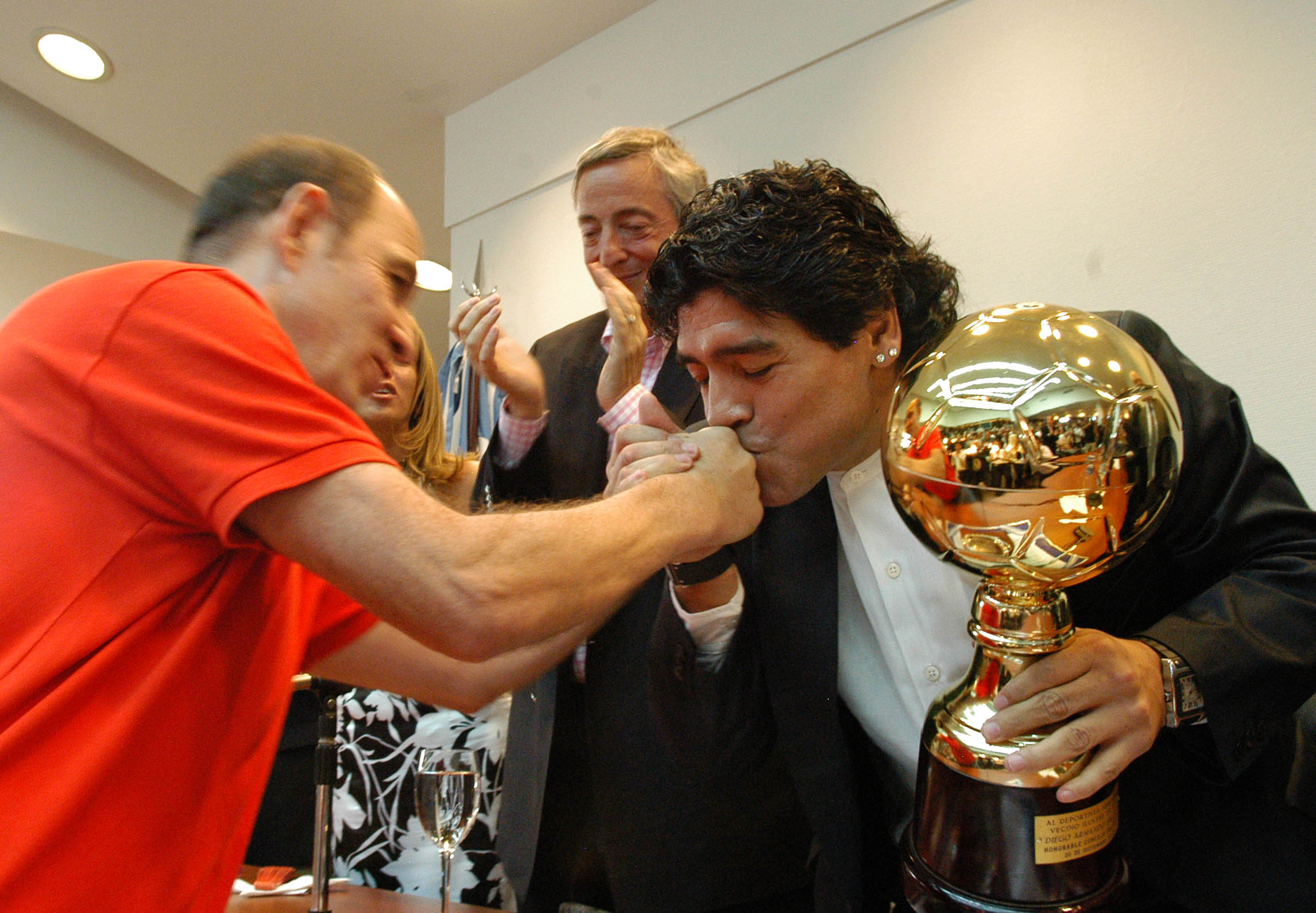
Bochini (left) with Diego Maradona (who confessed to be an admirer) in 2007. In the background, President of Argentina Néstor Kirchner

In 1991, three months after his retirement, Bochini was assigned as Independiente's manager together with Carlos Fren. The couple coached only the 1991 Apertura tournament which the team ended in eleventh position.

Fifth division club Barracas Bolívar decided to include him to play a few minutes in an official match played on 27 February 2007, 16 years after his retirement, as a recognition to his career.

In November 2007, a street was named after him in the city of Avellaneda where the Estadio Libertadores de América is located.

Bochini played for Independiente's veteran team in an official tournament organized by the Argentine Football Association in 2009.

He currently works as football advisor and image representative for Independiente.

== Career statistics ==
=== Club ===
Appearances and goals by club, season and competition
Club	Season	League			Continental		Other		Total	
Club	Season	Division	Apps	Goals	Apps	Goals	Apps	Goals	Apps	Goals
1972	Independiente	Primera División	10	1	—		—		10	1
1973	Independiente	Primera División	21	4	3	1	—		24	5
1974	Independiente	Primera División	36	15	10	3	—		46	18
1975	Independiente	Primera División	35	10	7	1	—		42	11
1976	Independiente	Primera División	19	1	6	2	—		25	3
1977	Independiente	Primera División	56	8	—		—		56	8
1978	Independiente	Primera División	39	11	7	2	—		46	13
1979	Independiente	Primera División	28	5	8	0	—		36	5
1980	Independiente	Primera División	35	0	—		—		35	0
1981	Independiente	Primera División	48	5	—		—		48	5
1982	Independiente	Primera División	26	3	—		—		26	3
1983	Independiente	Primera División	54	4	—		—		54	4
1984	Independiente	Primera División	31	5	13	2	—		44	7
1985	Independiente	Primera División	9	1	4	0	—		13	1
1985–86	Independiente	Primera División	33	9	—		—		33	9
1986–87	Independiente	Primera División	38	8	10	0	6	1	54	9
1987–88	Independiente	Primera División	32	3	—		—		32	3
1988–89	Independiente	Primera División	33	2	2	0	—		35	2
1989–90	Independiente	Primera División	27	1	3	0	4	0	34	1
1990–91	Independiente	Primera División	17	0	1	0	—		18	0
Total			634	97	74	11	10	1	718+	109+

=== International ===
Argentina national team
Year	Apps	Goals
1973	1	0
1974	2	0
1975	1	0
1976	10	0
1977	4	0
1978	0	0
1979	1	0
1980	0	0
1981	0	0
1982	0	0
1983	0	0
1984	6	0
1985	2	0
1986	1	0
Total	28	0

== Honours ==
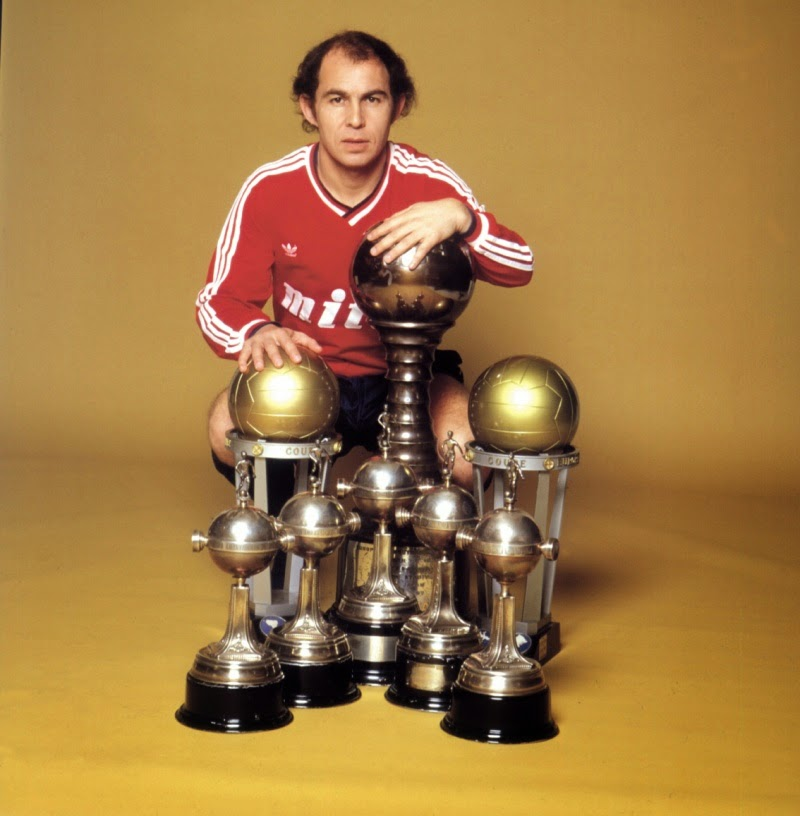
Bochini in 1989 posing with all the international cups won with Independiente in his career: Libertadores, Intercontinental and Interamericana

Independiente

- Argentine Primera División: Nacional 1977, Nacional 1978, Metropolitano 1983, 1988–89
- Copa Libertadores: 1973, 1974, 1975, 1984
- Copa Interamericana: 1972, 1974, 1975
- Intercontinental Cup: 1973, 1984

Argentina

- FIFA World Cup: 1986

Individual

- Footballer of the Year of Argentina: 1983
- South American Player of the Year Bronze award: 1984
- South American Team of the Year: 1989
- IFFHS Argentina All Times Dream Team (Team B): 2021
- One Club Award, 2022

== See also ==
- List of one-club men in association football
