= Rubén Galván =

Argentine footballer (1952–2018)

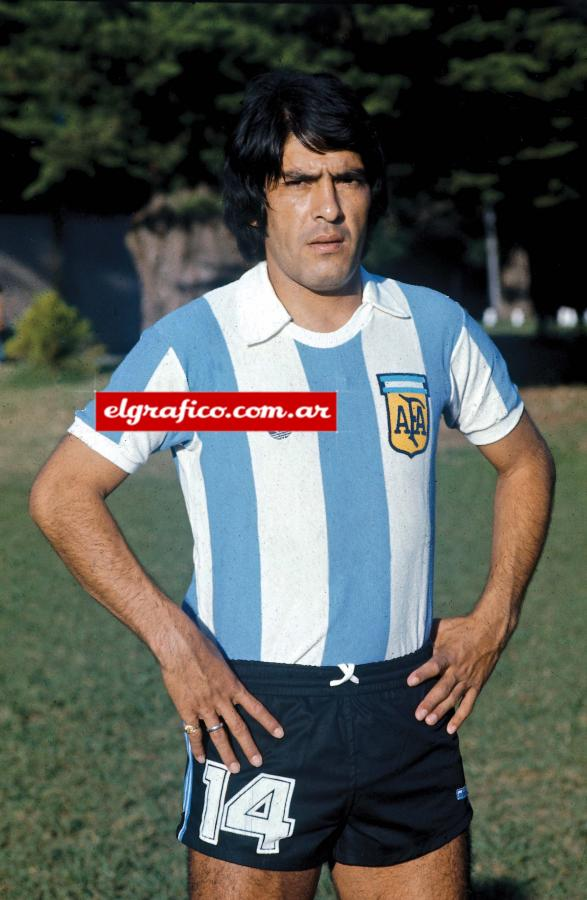
- Galván with Argentina in 1978

Personal information
- Full name: Rubén Galván
- Date of birth: 7 April 1952
- Place of birth: Comandante Fontana, Argentina
- Date of death: 14 March 2018 (aged 65)
- Place of death: Avellaneda, Argentina
- Position: Midfielder

Senior career*
Years	Team	Apps	(Gls)
1971–1980	Independiente	231	(14)
1980	Estudiantes (LP)	21	(7)
Total		252	(21)

International career
1974–1978	Argentina	3	(0)
Medal record
Representing Argentina
FIFA World Cup
Winner	1978 Argentina	Team
- * Club domestic league appearances and goals

Rubén Galván (7 April 1952 – 14 March 2018) was an Argentine footballer who played as a midfielder for Club Atlético Independiente for most of his career. At international level, he was part of the Argentina squad that won the 1978 FIFA World Cup on home soil.

== Club career ==
Galván is one of the most decorated players in the history of Argentine football with three Copa Libertadores, one intercontinental, three Nacional Championships and FIFA World Cup title to his name.

Galván was part of the Independiente team that won three consecutive Copa Libertadores titles between 1973 and 1975. He was also part of the team that won back to back Nacional championships in 1977 and 1978.

In 1980, he had a short spell with Estudiantes de La Plata but he retired later that year at age 27.

== Personal life ==
Nicknamed el Negro, Galván had a bout with Hepatitis C that required a liver transplant in 2007. He died of cirrhosis in March 2018.

== Honours ==
Independiente

- Primera División: 1971 Metropolitano, 1977 Nacional, 1978 Nacional
- Copa Libertadores: 1972, 1973, 1974, 1975
- Intercontinental Cup: 1973
- Copa Interamericana: 1972, 1974, 1975

Argentina

- FIFA World Cup: 1978
