= Argentine Footballer of the Year =

Argentine Footballer of the Year (Olimpia Award)
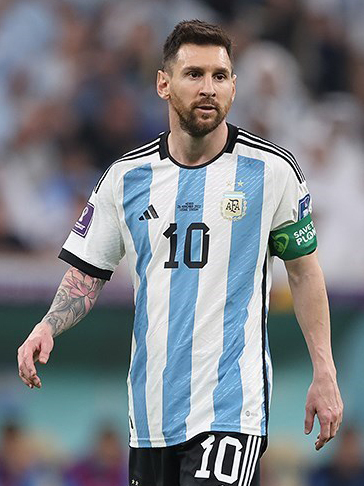
- Lionel Messi has won the award a record 16 times.
- Awarded for: Excellence in football
- Date: December
- Location: Buenos Aires
- Country: Argentina
- Presented by: Association of Sports Journalists of Argentina
- First award: 1970; 56 years ago
- Currently held by: Ángel Di María (2nd award)

Highlights
- Most awards: Lionel Messi (16 awards)
- Website: cpd.com.ar/olimpia

The Footballer of the Year of Argentina (in Spanish: Olimpia de Plata al Mejor Futbolista, that literally translates to "Silver Olimpia to the Best Footballer) is a yearly award given by the Argentine Sports Journalists' Circle (Círculo de Periodistas Deportivos de la República Argentina) as one of the Olimpia Awards, the most important sports award in Argentina.

The Olimpia is awarded in the sport of association football and, since 2008, is shared by the best player of the local league (who wins the Olimpia de Plata al Fútbol Local) and the best Argentine playing abroad (Olimpia de Plata al Fútbol del Exterior).

Up to 2008, the award was not shared, and was either given to the best player of Argentine nationality of the season (regardless if he plays in the local league or abroad), or to the best foreign footballer of the local league. It is unclear when Argentine footballers playing abroad and expatriate players in the country started being eligible. Mario Kempes in 1978 was the first Argentine to receive the award while playing abroad. Kempes was playing in the Spanish league for Valencia CF at the time, and had been a key player in the Argentina national team World Cup winning campaign of that year. On the other hand, Uruguayan Enzo Francescoli was the first foreign player to receive the award (in 1985, playing for River Plate).

Lionel Messi is the award's all-time record holder with sixteen wins, seven of which were in a row. Emiliano Martínez is the current (2024) holder of the award.

== Winners ==
All players and clubs are Argentine, unless otherwise noted.

Players awarded

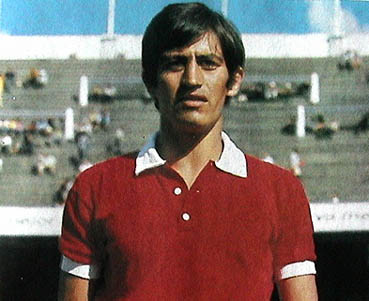
Héctor Yazalde (1970)

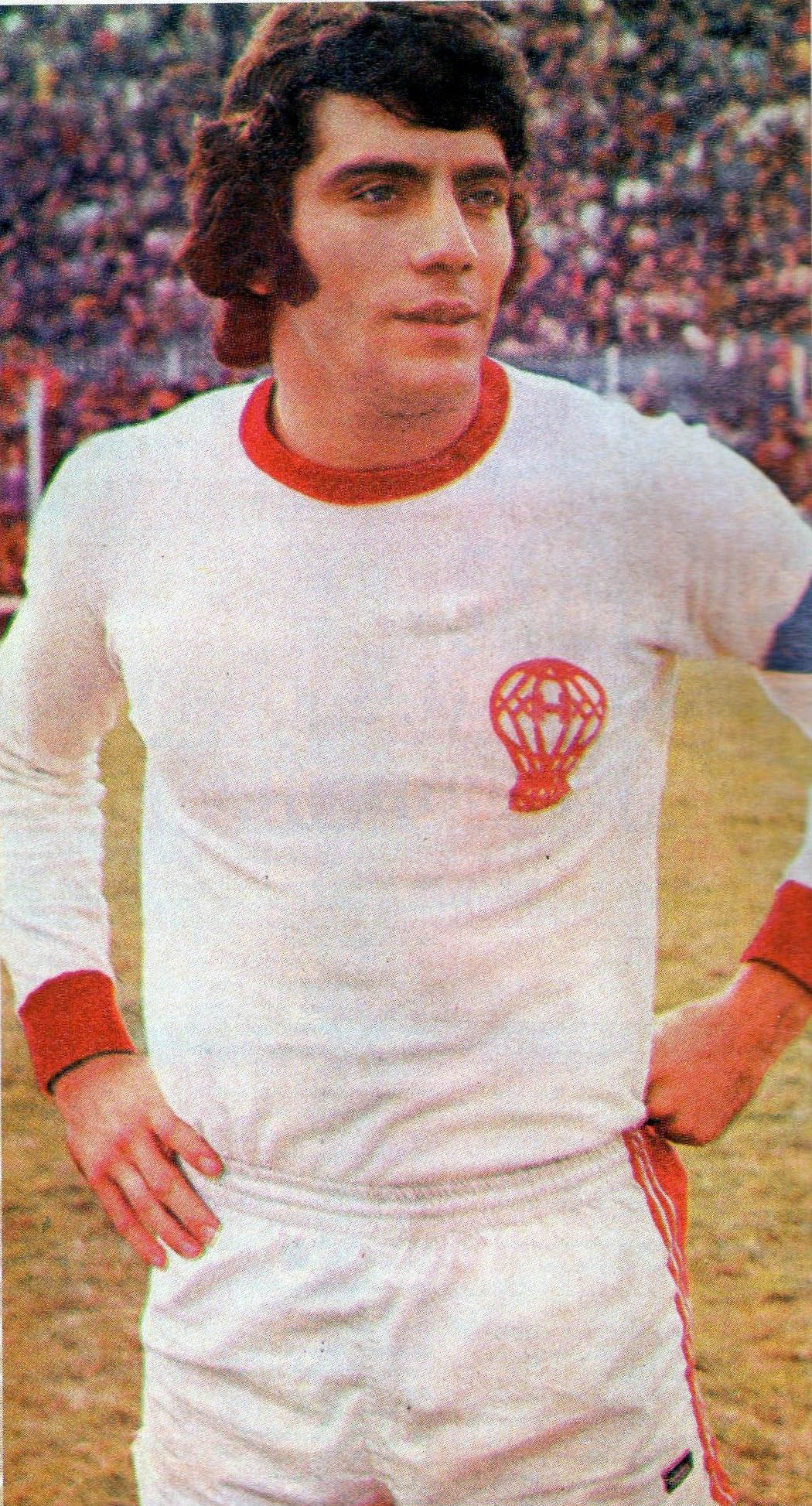
Miguel Brindisi (1973)

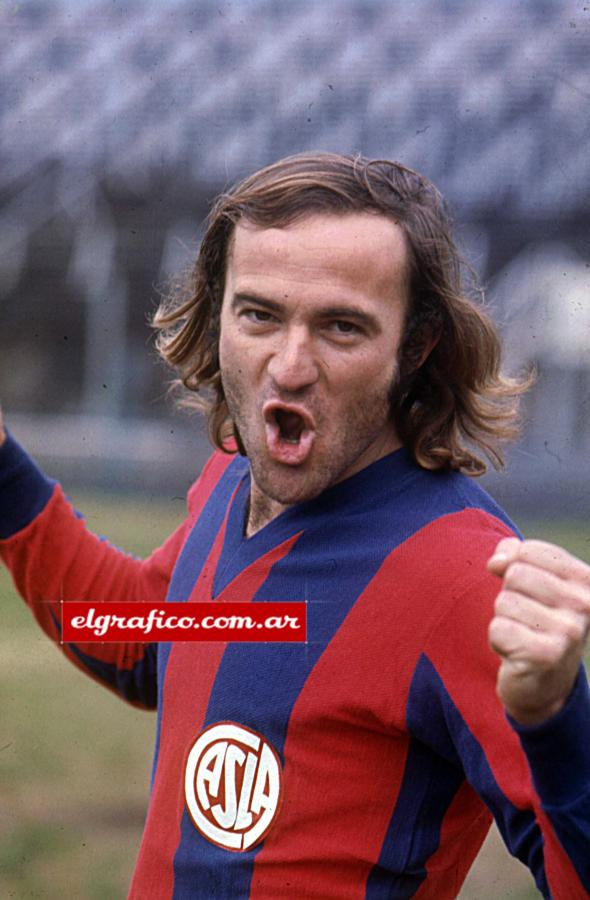
Néstor Scotta (1975)

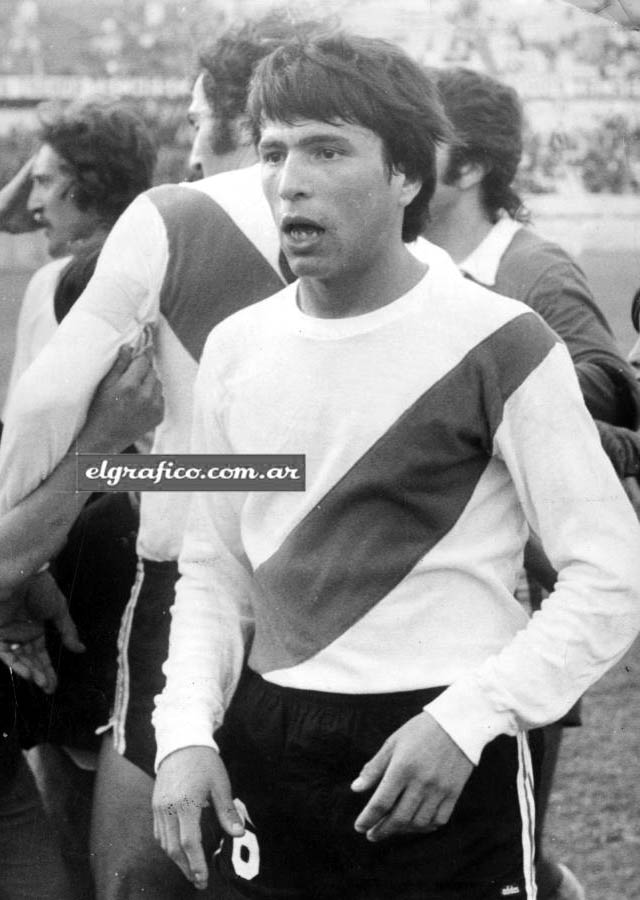
Daniel Passarella (1976)

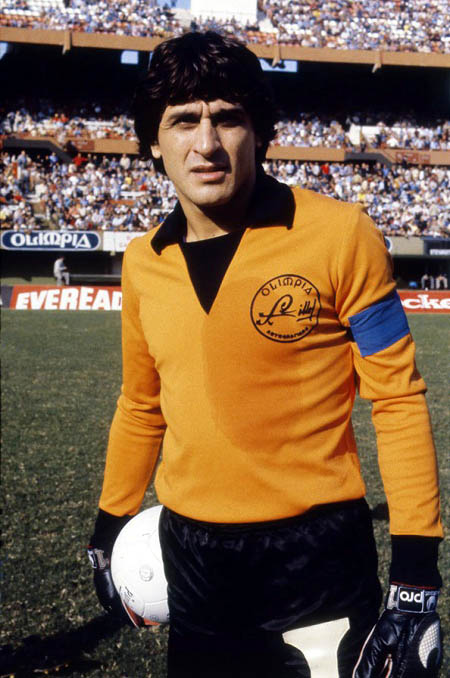
Ubaldo Fillol (1977)

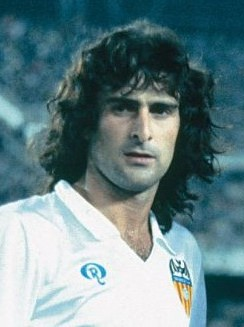
Mario Kempes (1978)

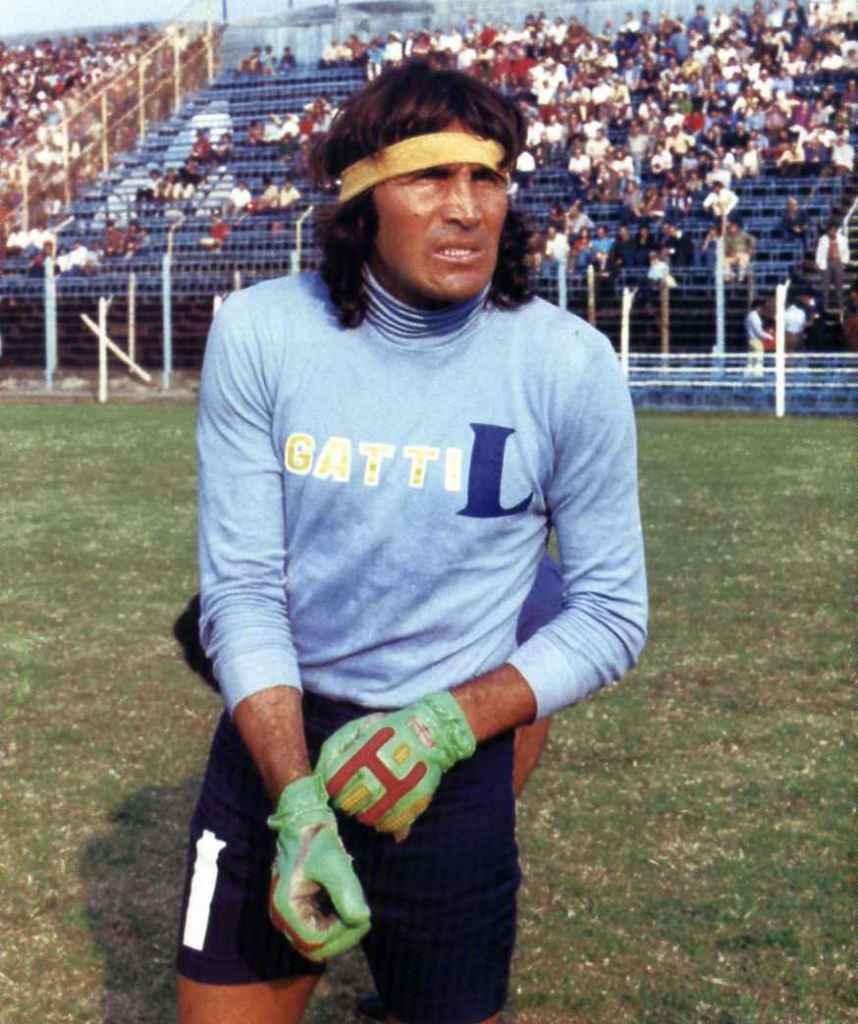
Hugo Gatti (1982)

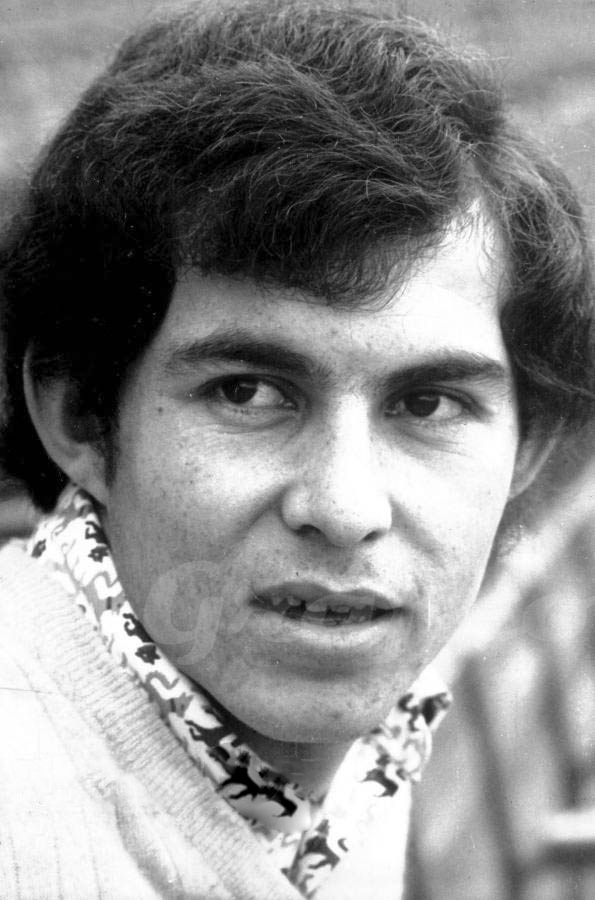
Ricardo Bochini (1983)

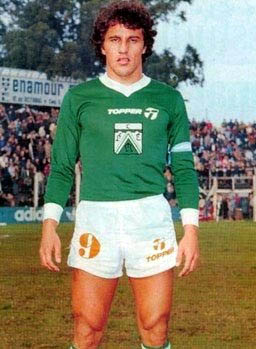
Alberto Marcico (1984)

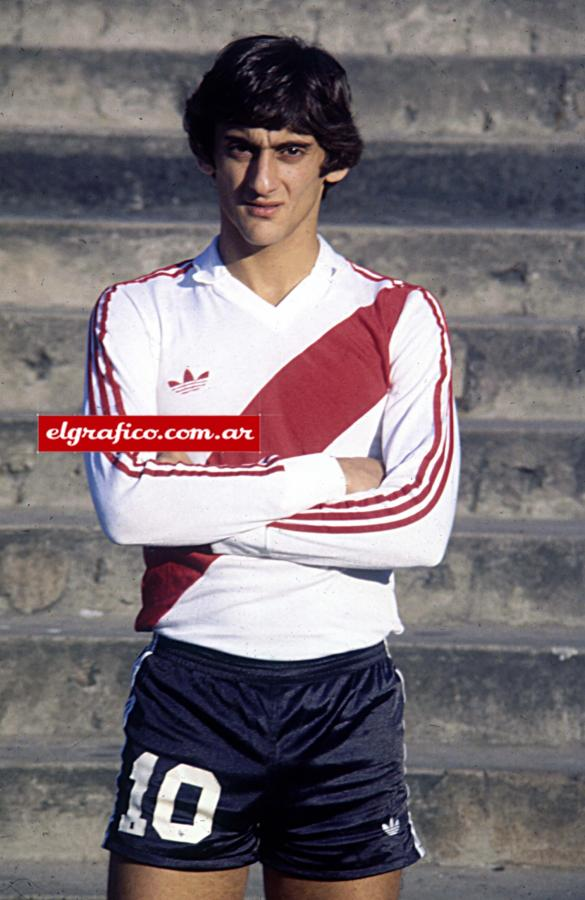
Enzo Francescoli (1985, 1995)

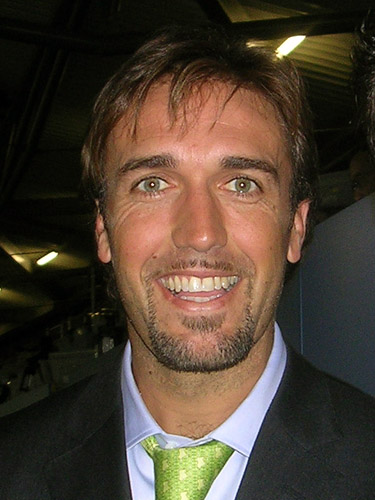
Gabriel Batistuta (1998)

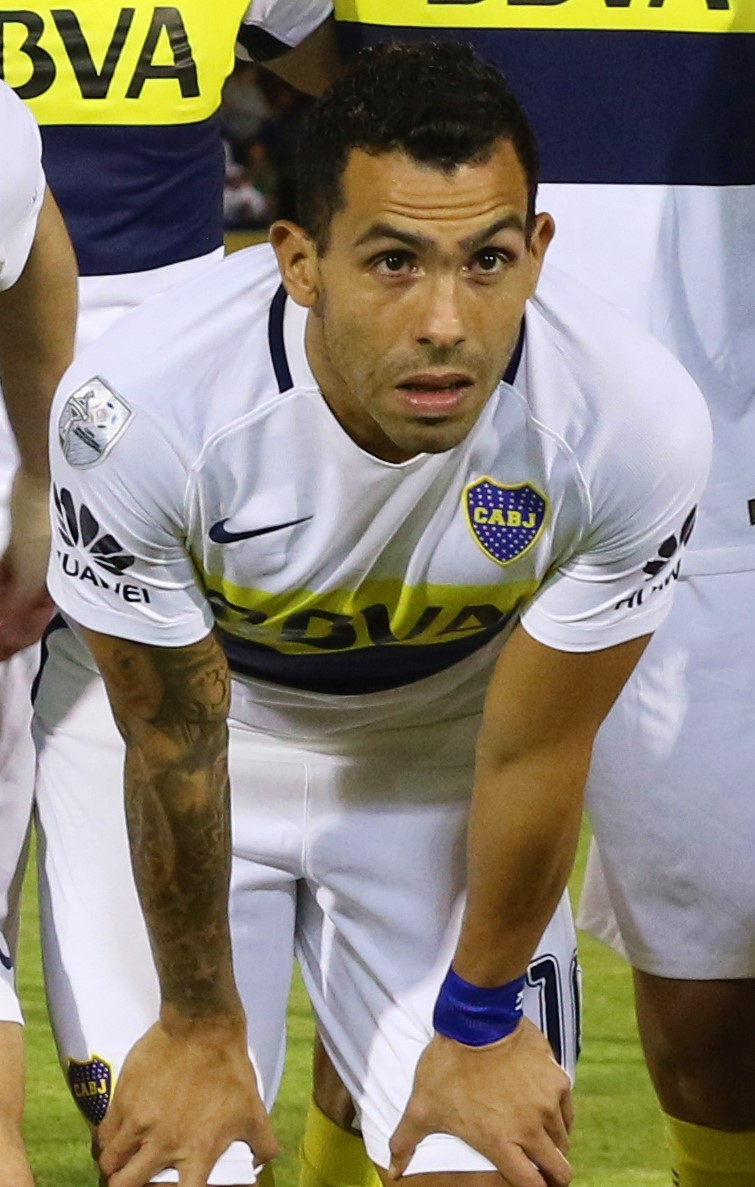
Carlos Tévez (2003, 2004)

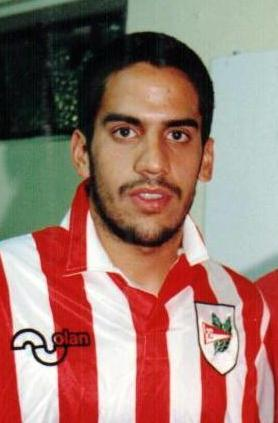
Juan S. Verón (2006, 2009)

Ed.	Year	Player	Club	Achievement / Notes
1	1970	Héctor Yazalde	Independiente	Won the Torneo Metropolitano 1970.
2	1971	José Pastoriza	Independiente	Won the Torneo Metropolitano 1971.
3	1972	Ángel Bargas	Chacarita Juniors	
4	1973	Miguel Ángel Brindisi	Huracán	Won the Torneo Metropolitano 1973
5	1974	Miguel Ángel Raimondo	Independiente	Won the 1974 Copa Libertadores and the 1974 Copa Interamericana.
6	1975	Héctor Scotta	San Lorenzo	Top scorer of the Torneo Metropolitano 1975 and the Torneo Nacional 1975. Top scorer in South America.
7	1976	Daniel Passarella	River Plate	Reached the final of the 1976 Copa Libertadores.
8	1977	Ubaldo Fillol	River Plate	Won the Torneo Metropolitano 1977
9	1978	Mario Kempes	(Spain) Valencia	Won the 1978 FIFA World Cup, best player and top scorer of the tournament. Won the Pichichi Trophy. Named South American Footballer of the Year and Onze d'Or.
10	1979	Diego Maradona	Argentinos Juniors	Won the 1979 FIFA World Youth Championship (MVP), top goalscorer of the Torneo Metropolitano 1979 and Torneo Nacional 1979. Won Olimpia de Oro. Named South American Footballer of the Year.
11	1980	Diego Maradona	Argentinos Juniors	Top goalscorer of the Torneo Metropolitano 1980 and Torneo Nacional 1980. Named South American Footballer of the Year.
12	1981	Diego Maradona	Boca Juniors	Won the Torneo Metropolitano 1981
13	1982	Hugo Gatti	Boca Juniors	
14	1983	Ricardo Bochini	Independiente	Won the Torneo Metropolitano 1983.
15	1984	Alberto Márcico	Ferro Carril Oeste	Won the Torneo Nacional 1984
16	1985	(Uruguay) Enzo Francescoli	River Plate	Although his team did not win the championship in 1985, Francescoli became the first foreign player to be named Footballer of the Year of Argentina.
17	1986	Diego Maradona	(Italy) Napoli	Captained Argentina to win the FIFA World Cup, named best player of the tournament, scored the "Goal of the Century", won Olimpia de Oro, Onze d'Or, United Press International Athlete of the Year Award and World Soccer Awards Player of the Year.
18	1987	Néstor Fabbri	Racing Club	
19	1988	(Uruguay) Rubén Paz	Racing Club	Won the 1988 Supercopa Libertadores. Named South American Footballer of the Year.
20	1989	Carlos Alfaro Moreno	Independiente	Won the 1988–89 Argentine Primera División.
21	1990	Sergio Goycochea	(Colombia) Millonarios	Golden Glove at the 1990 FIFA World Cup.
22	1991	Oscar Ruggeri	Vélez Sarsfield	Captained Argentina to win their first Copa America since 1959. Won Olimpia de Oro. Named South American Footballer of the Year.
23	1992	Luis Islas	Independiente	Won the 1992 King Fahd Cup.
24	1993	Ramón Medina Bello	River Plate	Won the Torneo Apertura 1993 and the 1993 Copa América.
25	1994	Carlos Navarro Montoya	Boca Juniors	Considered the best goalkeeper of Argentina.
26	1995	(Uruguay) Enzo Francescoli	River Plate	Won the 1995 Copa América (MVP). Named South American Footballer of the Year.
27	1996	(Paraguay) José Luis Chilavert	Vélez Sarsfield	Won the 1996 Supercopa Libertadores, Torneo Apertura 1996 and 1994 Copa Interamericana (played in 1996). Named South American Footballer of the Year.
28	1997	(Chile) Marcelo Salas	River Plate	Won the 1997 Supercopa Libertadores, Torneo Clausura 1997 and Torneo Apertura 1997. Named South American Footballer of the Year.
29	1998	Gabriel Batistuta	(Italy) Fiorentina	FIFA World Cup Silver Shoe at the 1998 FIFA World Cup.
30	1999	Javier Saviola	River Plate	Champion and top goalscorer of the Torneo Apertura 1999. Named South American Footballer of the Year.
31	2000	Román Riquelme	Boca Juniors	Won the 2000 Intercontinental Cup, 2000 Copa Libertadores and Torneo Apertura 2000.
32	2001	Román Riquelme	Boca Juniors	Won the 2001 Copa Libertadores (MVP). Named South American Footballer of the Year.
33	2002	Gabriel Milito	Independiente	Led the team that won the Torneo Apertura 2002.
34	2003	Carlos Tevez	Boca Juniors	Won the 2003 Intercontinental Cup, 2003 Copa Libertadores (MVP), Torneo Apertura 2003. Named South American Footballer of the Year.
35	2004	Carlos Tevez	Boca Juniors	Won the 2004 Copa Sudamericana, the 2004 CONMEBOL Men Pre-Olympic Tournament, gold medal at the 2004 Olympics, Olimpia de Oro. Named South American Footballer of the Year.
36	2005	Lionel Messi	(Spain) Barcelona	Won the 2005 FIFA World Youth Championship, top scorer and best player of the tournament. Won the 2004–05 La Liga.
37	2006	Juan S. Verón	Estudiantes LP	Led the team that won the Torneo Apertura 2006.
38	2007	Lionel Messi	(Spain) Barcelona	Won Copa América Best Young Player and Bravo Award.
39	2008	Román Riquelme	Boca Juniors	Led the team that won the Torneo Apertura 2008 and the 2008 Recopa Sudamericana. Won the gold medal at the 2008 Olympics.
39	2008	Lionel Messi	(Spain) Barcelona	Won the gold medal at the 2008 Olympics.
40	2009	Juan S. Verón	Estudiantes LP	Led the team that won the 2009 Copa Libertadores, named best player of the tournament and South American Footballer of the Year.
40	2009	Lionel Messi	(Spain) Barcelona	Won the 2009 FIFA Club World Cup, 2008–09 UEFA Champions League, 2009 UEFA Super Cup, 2008–09 La Liga, 2008–09 Copa del Rey, 2009 Supercopa de España, 2009 Ballon d'Or, 2009 FIFA World Player of the Year and Onze d'Or.
41	2010	Juan Manuel Martínez	Vélez Sársfield	
41	2010	Lionel Messi	(Spain) Barcelona	Won the 2009–10 La Liga, 2010 Supercopa de España, 2010 FIFA Ballon d'Or, Pichichi Trophy and European Golden Shoe.
42	2011	Román Riquelme	Boca Juniors	Led the team that won the Torneo Apertura 2011.
42	2011	Lionel Messi	(Spain) Barcelona	Won the 2011 FIFA Club World Cup, 2010–11 UEFA Champions League, 2011 UEFA Super Cup, 2010–11 La Liga, 2011 Supercopa de España, 2011 FIFA Ballon d'Or, UEFA Men's Player of the Year Award, Onze d'Or and Olimpia de Oro.
43	2012	Lisandro López	Arsenal	Led the team that won the Torneo Clausura 2012 and the 2012 Supercopa Argentina, the first national titles in the club's history.
43	2012	Lionel Messi	(Spain) Barcelona	Won the 2011–12 Copa del Rey. Won the 2012 FIFA Ballon d'Or, Onze d'Or, Pichichi Trophy and European Golden Shoe.
44	2013	Maxi Rodríguez	Newell's Old Boys	Led the team that won the Torneo Final 2013.
44	2013	Lionel Messi	(Spain) Barcelona	Won the 2012–13 La Liga and the 2013 Supercopa de España. Won the Pichichi Trophy, European Golden Shoe and FIFA World Cup Golden Ball and reached the final of the 2014 FIFA World Cup.
45	2014	Lucas Pratto	Vélez Sarsfield	Top goalscorer of the 2014 Argentine Primera División, won the 2013 Supercopa Argentina.
45	2014	Ángel Di María	(Spain) Real Madrid (England) Manchester United	Won the 2013–14 Copa Del Rey, 2013–14 UEFA Champions League, 2014 UEFA Super Cup and reached the final of the 2014 FIFA World Cup.
46	2015	Marco Ruben	Rosario Central	Top goalscorer of the 2015 Primera División
46	2015	Lionel Messi	(Spain) Barcelona	Won the 2014–15 UEFA Champions League, 2015 FIFA Club World Cup, 2015 UEFA Super Cup, 2014–15 La Liga and 2014–15 Copa del Rey. Won the 2015 FIFA Ballon d'Or and UEFA Men's Player of the Year Award.
47	2016	Fernando Belluschi	San Lorenzo	Won the 2015 Supercopa Argentina and chosen as man of the match.
47	2016	Lionel Messi	(Spain) Barcelona	Won the 2015–16 La Liga, the 2015–16 Copa del Rey and the 2016 Supercopa de España.
48	2017	Darío Benedetto	Boca Juniors	Top goalscorer and champion of the 2016–17 Primera.
48	2017	Lionel Messi	(Spain) Barcelona	Won the 2016–17 Copa del Rey, European Golden Shoe, Pichichi Trophy.
49	2018	Pity Martínez	River Plate	Led the team that won the 2018 Copa Libertadores and the 2017 Supercopa Argentina (played in 2018), both finals against Boca Juniors. Named South American Footballer of the Year.
50	2019	Lionel Messi	(Spain) Barcelona	Won the 2018–19 La Liga, 2019 Ballon d'Or, The Best FIFA Men's Player, the Pichichi Trophy and European Golden Shoe.
51	2020	Lionel Messi	(Spain) Barcelona	Member of the Ballon d’Or Dream Team, member of the typical FIFA FIFPro World11, Laureus World Sports Award for Sportsman of the Year and the Pichichi Trophy.
52	2021	Lionel Messi	(Spain) Barcelona (France) Paris Saint-Germain	Captained Argentina to win the Copa America for the first time in 28 years. Named best player, top scorer and best passer of the tournament. Received a record seventh Ballon d'Or, won Pichichi Trophy for the 8th time, won the Copa del Rey for the 7th time. Won Olimpia de Oro.
53	2022	Lionel Messi	(France) Paris Saint-Germain	Captained Argentina to win the World Cup for the first time in 36 years. Named best player of the tournament and best passer of the tournament, won Ligue 1, won Trophée des Champions, won Finalissima, won IFFHS Best Playmaker for the 5th time and won Olimpia de Oro.
54	2023	Lionel Messi	(France) Paris Saint-Germain (United States) Inter Miami	Won Ligue 1, Leagues Cup, Laureus World Sports Award for Sportsman of the Year, Olimpia de Oro, his eighth Ballon d'Or and his third The Best FIFA Football Award.
55	2024	Emiliano Martínez	(England) Aston Villa	Won the 2024 Copa América, Yashin Trophy, The Best FIFA Men's Goalkeeper, IFFHS World's Best Goalkeeper, Copa América Golden Glove and Olimpia de Oro.
56	2025	Ángel Di María	(Portugal) S.L. Benfica; Rosario Central	Won the 2024–25 Taça da Liga. Returned to Rosario Central after 18 years and was awarded retroactively by AFA a newly created league title ("Campeón de Liga") for having been the team with the most points in the aggregate table.

== Most wins ==
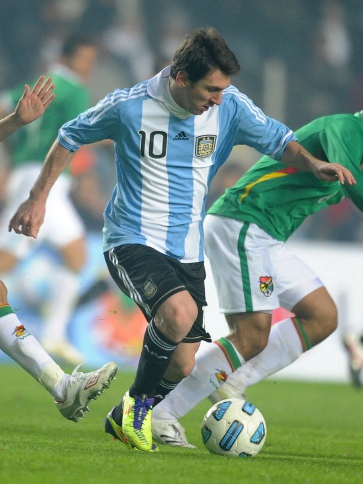
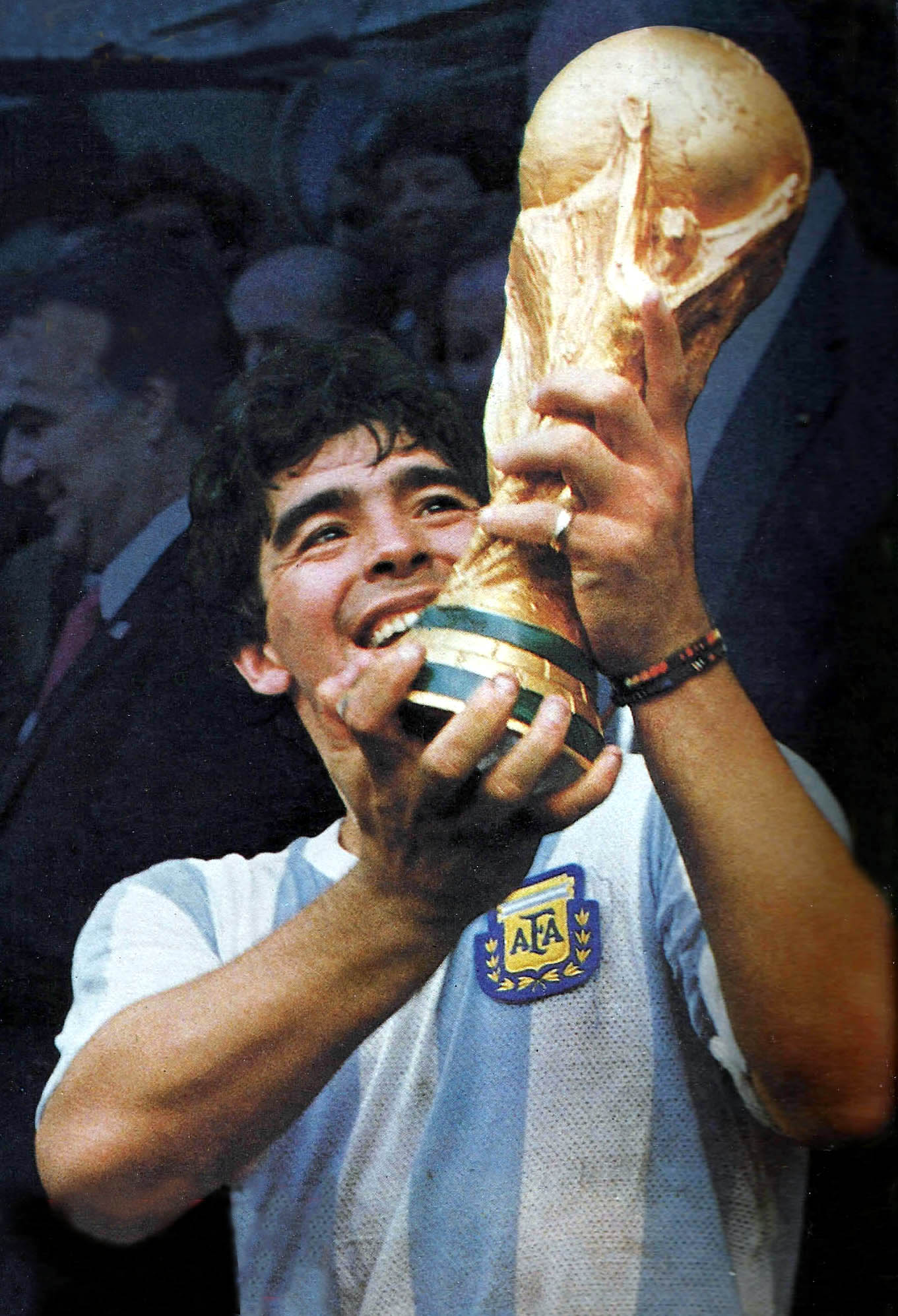
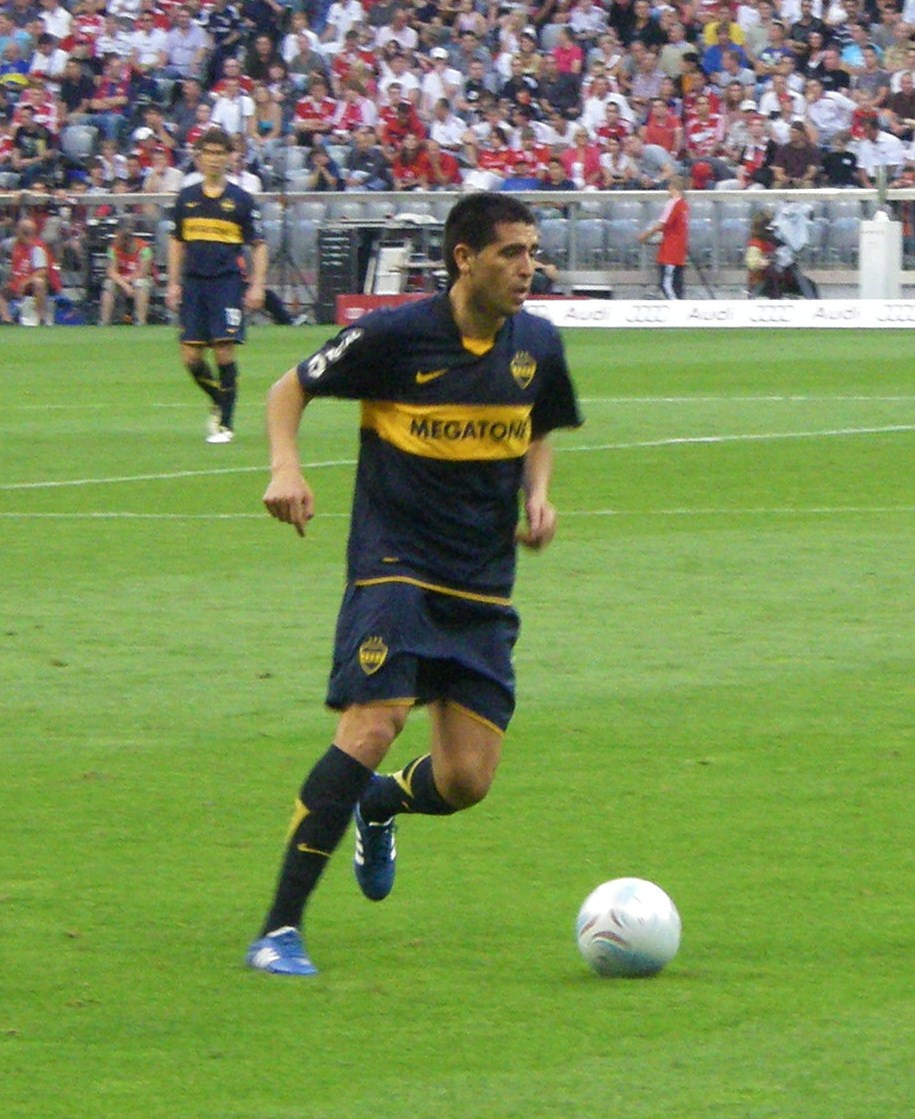
Fltr: Lionel Messi, who has dominated the award by winning it a record 16 times, 7 of which consecutively; Diego Maradona and Juan R. Riquelme won 4 times each the trophy

Player	Wins
Lionel Messi	16
Diego Maradona	4
Juan Román Riquelme	4
Juan Sebastián Verón	2
Carlos Tevez	2
Enzo Francescoli	2
Ángel Di María	2

== See also ==
- Olimpia Award
