= Carlos Gay =

Argentine footballer

Personal information
- Full name: Carlos Alfredo Gay
- Date of birth: 20 April 1952 (age 74)
- Place of birth: Etruria, Argentina
- Height: 1.87 m (6 ft 2 in)
- Position: Goalkeeper

Youth career
- Independiente

Senior career*
Years	Team	Apps	(Gls)
1971–1977	Independiente	86	(0)
1978	San Lorenzo	4	(0)
1978	Deportivo Roca	14	(0)
1979–1980	América de Cali	61	(0)
1981	Racing	2	(0)
1982	Unión Magdalena		
1983	Independiente Medellín		
1984–1985	River Plate	4	(0)
1985–1988	Huracán	45	(0)
- * Club domestic league appearances and goals as of 2 February 2024

Carlos Alfredo Gay (born 20 April 1952), is an Argentine former professional footballer who played as a goalkeeper.

== Career ==
Carlos Gay began his career in the youth sectors of Independiente Avellaneda, during the club's golden age in the 70s, where he was four consecutive Copa Libertadores champions. He was decisive in the 1974 edition, saving a penalty in the play-off of the final against São Paulo FC. As a substitute, he also won the Intercontinental Cup. Carlos Gay was also Colombian national champion with América de Cali, in addition to having played for San Lorenzo, Deportivo Roca, Racing and Huracán in Argentine football.

== Honours ==
Independiente

- Intercontinental Cup: 1973
- Copa Libertadores: 1972, 1973, 1974, 1975
- Argentine Primera División: 1977
- Copa Interamericana: 1973, 1974, 1976

América de Cali

- Categoría Primera A: 1979
