= 1974 Copa Interamericana =

Football tournament edition

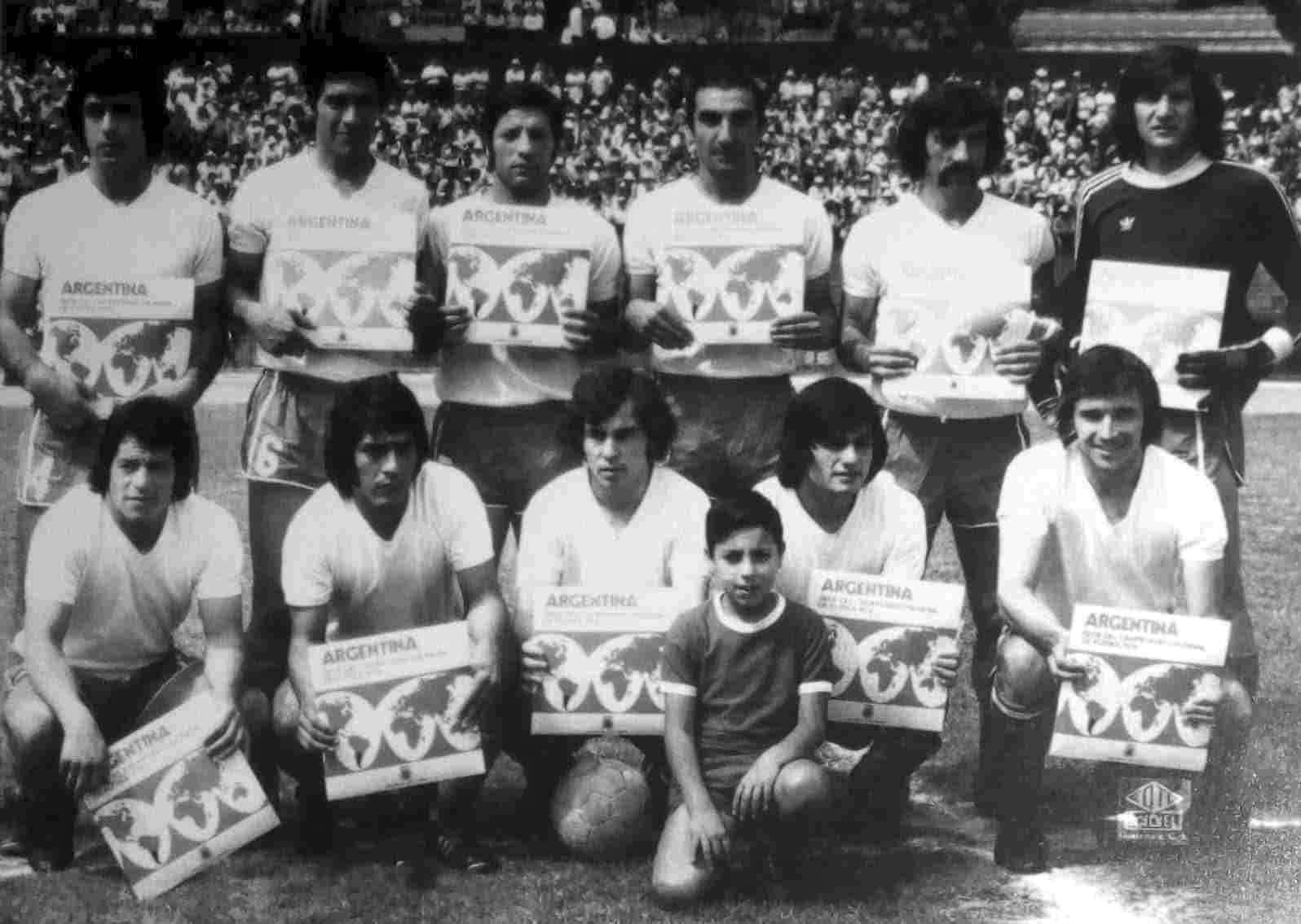
- Independiente, champions
- Event: Copa Interamericana
Municipal	Independiente
(Guatemala)	(Argentina)
1	1
- (tied on points and goal difference; Independiente won 4–2 on penalties)

First leg
Municipal	Independiente
0	1
- Date: November 24, 1974
- Venue: Mateo Flores, Guatemala City
- Referee: G. Velázquez (Colombia)

Second leg
Independiente	Municipal
0	1
- Date: November 26, 1974
- Venue: Mateo Flores, Guatemala City
- Referee: M. Canesa (Colombia)

The 1974 Copa Interamericana was the 4th. edition of the Copa Interamericana. The final was contested by Argentine Club Atlético Independiente (champion of 1974 Copa Libertadores) and Guatemalan team Municipal (winner of 1974 CONCACAF Champions' Cup). The final was played under a two-leg format in November 1974. Both matches were held in Guatemala City.

In the first leg, hosted at Mateo Flores, Independiente beat Municipal 1–0, while the second leg was won by Municipal 1–0. As both teams tied on points and goal difference, a penalty shoot-out was carried out to decide a champion. Independiente won 4–2 on penalties, therefore the Argentine team won their second Interamericana trophy.

== Qualified teams ==
Team	Qualification	Previous app.
(Argentina) Independiente	1974 Copa Libertadores winner	**1972**
(Guatemala) Municipal	1974 CONCACAF Champions' Cup winner	None

Bold indicates winning years

== Venue ==
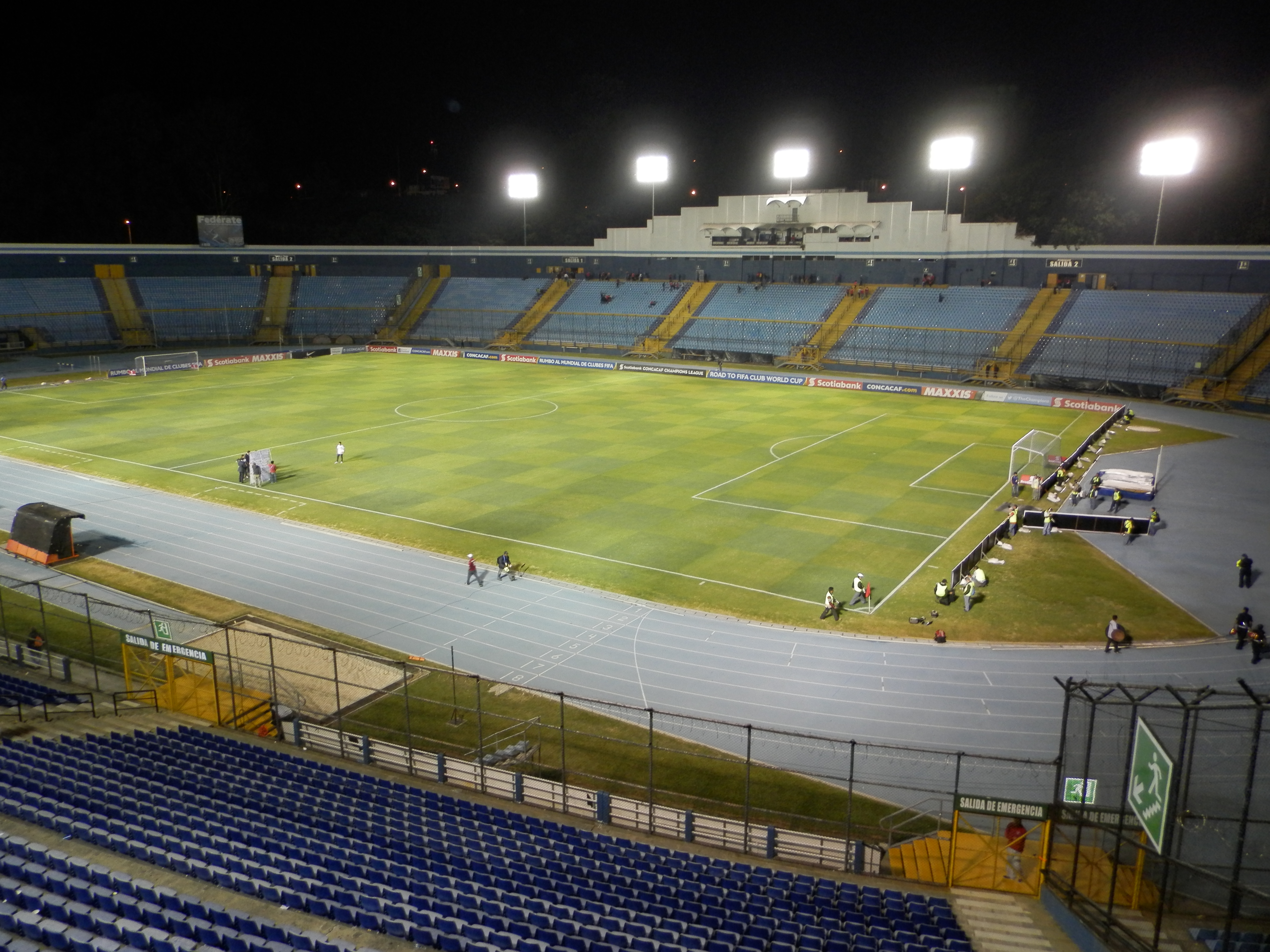
Estadio Mateo Flores was the venue for both matches

Both games were held in Estadio Mateo Flores in Guatemala City for economic reasons, after a proposal from Municipal to Independiente. As the match attracted more interest of Guatemalan fans than Argentine supporters, both teams agreed to play the series in Guatemala.

The stadium had been built in 1948, as part of the project to build a group of sports facilities known as Ciudad Olímpica. Originally named "Estadio Olímpico" erroneously, since it has never hosted an Olympic competition, the stadium had been inaugurated on February 23, 1950, to host the VI Central American and Caribbean Games. Local long-distance runner Mateo Flores (born Doroteo Guamuch) won the half marathon event there, being also winner of the Boston Marathon in 1952. The stadium was later named after the athlete, died in 2011.

== Match details ==
=== First leg ===
1974 Copa Interamericana
November 24, 1974
First leg

Municipal (Guatemala)	0–1	(Argentina) Independiente
	Report	Bochini 15'

Mateo Flores, Guatemala City
Referee: G. Velázquez (Colombia)

GK	(Guatemala) Adrián Fernández
DF	(Guatemala) Alberto López Oliva
DF	(Guatemala) Carlos Monterroso
DF	(Guatemala) Lijón León
DF	(Guatemala) Armando Melgar Retolaza	(substituted off) a'
MF	(Guatemala) Miguel A. Pérez
MF	(Guatemala) Benjamín Monterroso
MF	(Uruguay) Raúl Benítez
FW	(Argentina) José Mitrovich	(substituted off) b'
FW	(Argentina) Miguel A. Cobián
FW	(Guatemala) Julio César Anderson
Substitutes:
	(Guatemala) Abraham Rivahi	(substituted on) a'
FW	(Guatemala) Felipe Carías	Substituted on
Manager:
(Uruguay) Rubén Amorín

GK	(Argentina) Carlos Gay
DF	(Argentina) Eduardo Commisso
DF	(Argentina) Miguel Ángel López
DF	(Argentina) Francisco Sá
DF	(Uruguay) Ricardo Pavoni
MF	(Argentina) Rubén Galván	Substituted off
MF	(Argentina) Miguel Ángel Raimondo
MF	(Argentina) Hugo Saggiorato
FW	(Argentina) Agustín Balbuena
FW	(Argentina) Ricardo Bochini
FW	(Argentina) Daniel Bertoni
Substitutes:
MF	(Argentina) Alejandro Semenewicz	(substituted on) a'
Manager:
(Argentina) Roberto Ferreiro

=== Second leg ===
November 26, 1974
Second leg

Municipal (Guatemala)	1–0	(Argentina) Independiente
Mitrovich 50'	Report
Penalties
Cobián (penalty scored); Anderson (penalty missed); Monterroso (penalty missed); Mitrovich (penalty scored)	2–4	(penalty scored) Pavoni; (penalty scored) Giribert; (penalty scored) Bochini; (penalty scored) Bertoni

Mateo Flores, Guatemala City
Referee: M. Canesa (Colombia)

**Municipal**	**Independiente**

GK	(Guatemala) Adrián Fernández
DF	(Guatemala) Alberto López Oliva
DF	(Guatemala) Carlos Monterroso
DF	(Guatemala) Lijón León
DF	(Guatemala) Armando Melgar Retolaza
MF	(Guatemala) Miguel A. Pérez
MF	(Guatemala) Benjamín Monterroso
MF	(Uruguay) Raúl Benítez
FW	(Argentina) José Mitrovich
FW	(Guatemala) Felipe Carías	(substituted off) 62'
FW	(Guatemala) Julio César Anderson
Substitutes:
	(Argentina) Miguel A. Cobián	(substituted on) 62'
Manager:
(Uruguay) Rubén Amorín

GK	(Argentina) Carlos Gay
DF	(Argentina) Eduardo Commisso
DF	(Argentina) Miguel Ángel López
DF	(Argentina) Francisco Sá
DF	(Uruguay) Ricardo Pavoni
MF	(Argentina) Rubén Galván
MF	(Argentina) Miguel Ángel Raimondo
MF	(Argentina) Hugo Saggiorato	(substituted off) 78'
FW	(Argentina) Agustín Balbuena
FW	(Argentina) Ricardo Bochini
FW	(Argentina) Daniel Bertoni
Substitutes:
	(Argentina) Luis A. Giribert	(substituted on) 78'
Manager:
(Argentina) Roberto Ferreiro
