= Daniel Bertoni =

Argentine footballer (born 1955)

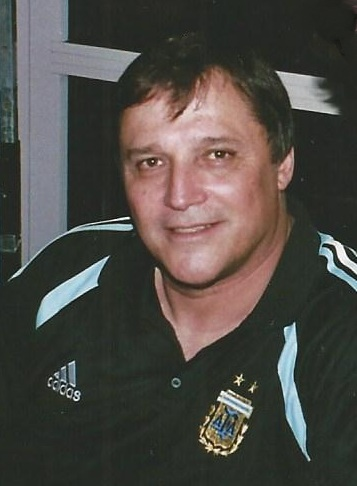
- Bertoni in 2006

Personal information
- Full name: Ricardo Daniel Bertoni
- Date of birth: 14 March 1955 (age 71)
- Place of birth: Bahía Blanca, Argentina
- Height: 1.79 m (5 ft 10 in)
- Position: Right winger

Senior career*
Years	Team	Apps	(Gls)
1971–1972	Quilmes	30	(12)
1973–1978	Independiente	179	(80)
1978–1980	Sevilla	57	(24)
1980–1984	Fiorentina	97	(27)
1984–1986	Napoli	53	(14)
1986–1987	Udinese	20	(1)
Total		446	(158)

International career
1974–1982	Argentina	31	(12)
Medal record
Men's football
Representing Argentina
FIFA World Cup
Winner	1978 Argentina
- * Club domestic league appearances and goals

Ricardo Daniel Bertoni (born 14 March 1955) is an Argentine former footballer who played as a right or left winger. In Argentina, he had a successful career at Club Atlético Independiente, where he won three Copa Libertadores, one Intercontinental Cup and three Copa Interamericana trophies.

Bertoni was also capped for the Argentina national team, where he scored the 3rd goal for the team in the 1978 FIFA World Cup final. After his retirement, he worked as a manager and sports commentator.

== Club career ==
Bertoni started playing in Argentine's second division for Quilmes in 1972. After one year, he was transferred to first division's team Independiente, where he played alongside Ricardo Bochini and won one national and several international titles.

Bertoni emigrated in 1978 to Spain to play for Sevilla. He played successfully in the Italian League for many years, mainly for Fiorentina and Napoli.

== International career ==
Bertoni played 31 times for the Argentina national football team between 1974 and 1982. in both the 1978 and the 1982 FIFA World Cups. In the 1978 World Cup on home soil, he scored Argentina's third goal in the final against Netherlands in a 3–1 extra-time win, as Argentina went on to lift the trophy.

== Career statistics ==
=== Club ===
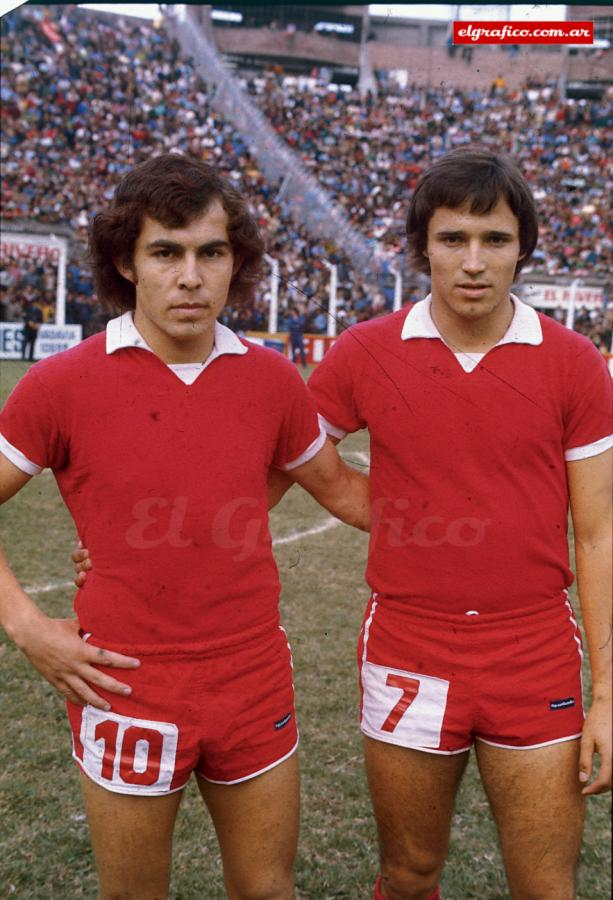
Bertoni (#7) with Ricardo Bochini in Independiente, 1974

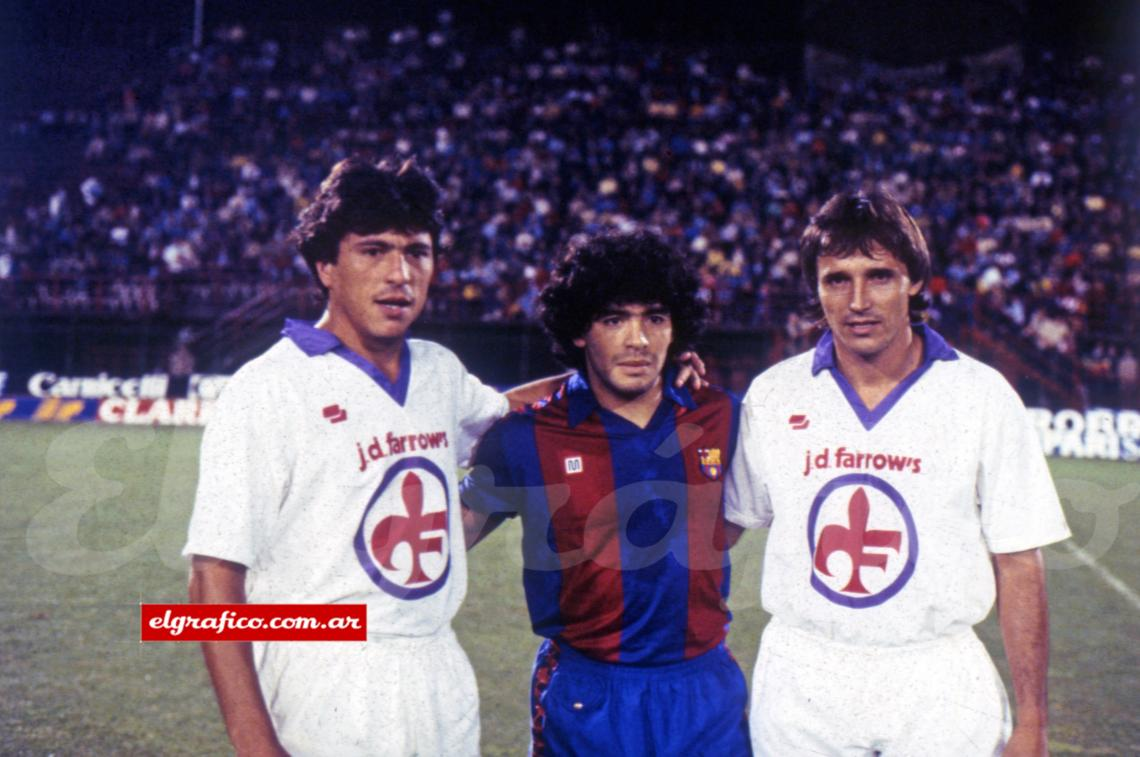
Bertoni (right) with countryfellows Daniel Passarella and Diego Maradona in 1982

Club performance			League		Cup		League Cup		Continental		Total	
Club	Season	League	Apps	Goals	Apps	Goals	Apps	Goals	Apps	Goals	Apps	Goals
Argentina			League		Cup		League Cup		South America		Total	
Quilmes	1972	Primera B	31	12	—		—		—		31	12
Independiente	1973	Primera División	35	8	—		—		5	0	40	8
Independiente	1974	Primera División	35	17	—		—		11	5	46	22
Independiente	1975	Primera División	33	12	—		—		7	3	40	15
Independiente	1976	Primera División	42	13	—		—		7	1	49	14
Independiente	1977	Primera División	34	22	—		—				34	22
Independiente	1978	Primera División	0	0	—		—				0	0
Spain			League		Copa del Rey		Supercopa de España		Europe		Total	
Sevilla	1978–79	La Liga	25	8	7	2	—		-	-	32	10
Sevilla	1979–80	La Liga	32	16	7	4	—		-	-	39	20
Italy			League		Coppa Italia		League Cup		Europe		Total	
Fiorentina	1980–81	Serie A	25	4	6	1	-	-			31	5
Fiorentina	1981–82	Serie A	30	9	6	1	—				36	10
Fiorentina	1982–83	Serie A	16	4	5	1	—		2	1	23	6
Fiorentina	1983–84	Serie A	26	10	6	0	—				32	10
Napoli	1984–85	Serie A	27	11	7	4	—				34	15
Napoli	1985–86	Serie A	26	3	3	0	—				29	3
Udinese	1986–87	Serie A	20	1			—				20	1
Avellino	1987–88	Serie A	0	0			—				0	0
Argentina			209	92	—		—		30	9	239	101
Spain			57	24	14	6	—		-	-	71	30
Italy			170	42	33	7	—		2	1	205	50
Career total			436	158	47	13	—		32	10	515	181

=== International ===
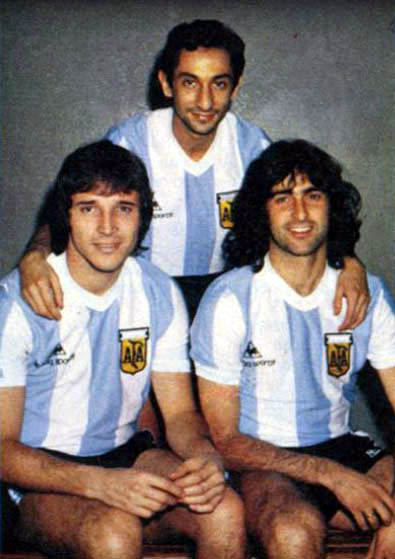
Bertoni (left) with Osvaldo Ardiles and Mario Kempes, 1981

Appearances and goals by national team and year

National team	Year	Apps	Goals
Argentina	1974	1	0
Argentina	1975	0	0
Argentina	1976	4	1
Argentina	1977	7	7
Argentina	1978	11	2
Argentina	1979	1	0
Argentina	1980	0	0
Argentina	1981	2	0
Argentina	1982	5	2
Total		31	12

== Honours ==
Independiente

- Argentine Primera División: Nacional 1977
- Copa Libertadores: 1973, 1974, 1975
- Copa Interamericana: 1973, 1974, 1976
- Intercontinental Cup: 1973

Argentina

- FIFA World Cup: 1978

Individual

- Fiorentina Hall of Fame: 2018
