= Leonel Urbina =

Mexican footballer (born 1945)

Personal information
- Full name: Leonel Urbina García
- Date of birth: 25 April 1945 (age 81)
- Place of birth: Zamora, Michoacán, Mexico
- Position: Midfielder

Senior career*
Years	Team	Apps	(Gls)
1965–1970	Atlético Morelia		
1970–1973	Puebla		(1)
1973–1977	Atlético Español		

International career
1969	Mexico	5	(0)

Managerial career
- 1982: Puebla
- * Club domestic league appearances and goals

Leonel Urbina García (born 25 April 1945) is a retired Mexican football player and manager. He played as a midfielder for Puebla and Atlético Español throughout the 1970s as he was part of the winning squad for the 1975 CONCACAF Champions' Cup. He also represented Mexico for the 1969 CONCACAF Championship.

== Club career ==
Urbina began his career with Atlético Morelia throughout the late 1960s where he played alongside other players such as Alfredo Martínez, Víctor Pérez, Mario Barrera, Ceja, Ochoa, Leopoldo Villalón, Sergio López, Lupe Flores, Manuel González and Luis Marotti. During the 1970 season, he was signed for Puebla where the club successfully achieved promotion for the subsequent 1970–71 Mexican Primera División season. Throughout the early 1970s, he played alongside other players such as Manuel Lapuente and Benito Pardo as they would later serve some form of administrative roles within the club in the later half of the decade. He would also score a single goal in his entire career with the club during Adhemar Bianchini's debut game in a 1–1 draw against León at Camp Nou. He then played for Atlético Español for the remainder of his career with his biggest contribution coming through his goal against runners-up Transvaal in the first leg match on 7 March 1975 as the club went on to win the 1975 CONCACAF Champions' Cup.

== Later life ==
Urbina first served as an interim manager for Puebla during the 1981–82 season. He then served as the Secretary of the Disciplinary Committee for the Mexican Football Federation throughout the 2010s.
