= 1978 Argentine Primera División =

87th season of top-tier football league in Argentina

Primera División
- Season: 1978
- Champions: Quilmes (Metropolitano); Independiente (Nacional)

The 1978 Primera División season was the 87th season of top-flight football in Argentina. Quilmes won the Metropolitano (2nd title) and Independiente achieved the Nacional championship (12th title).

Banfield and Estudiantes (BA) were relegated.

== Metropolitano Championship ==
Metropolitano
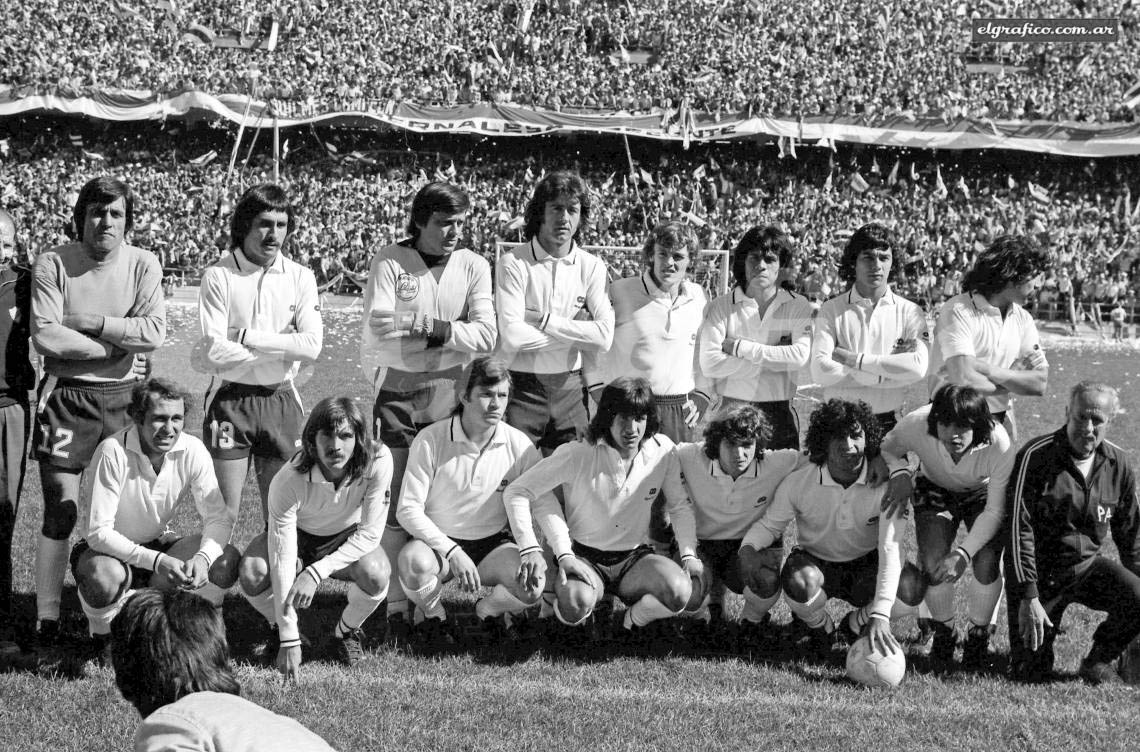
- Quilmes, Metropolitano champions
- Season: 1978
- Champions: Quilmes (2nd title)
- Promoted: Estudiantes (BA)
- Relegated: Banfield; Estudiantes (BA)
- 1979 Copa Libertadores: Quilmes
- Top goalscorer: (Argentina) Luis Andreuchi (Argentina) Diego Maradona (22 goals each)

Pos	Team	Pld	W	D	L	GF	GA	GD	Pts
1	Quilmes	40	22	10	8	53	41	+12	54
2	Boca Juniors	40	20	13	7	58	45	+13	53
3	Unión	40	20	12	8	58	36	+22	52
4	San Lorenzo	40	17	13	10	47	41	+6	47
5	Argentinos Juniors	40	17	12	11	66	52	+14	46
6	River Plate	40	16	13	11	59	47	+12	45
7	Newell's Old Boys	40	14	16	10	52	36	+16	44
8	Independiente	40	15	13	12	69	54	+15	43
9	Racing	40	15	12	13	58	46	+12	42
10	Rosario Central	40	13	16	11	43	32	+11	42
11	Gimnasia y Esgrima (LP)	40	11	18	11	41	44	−3	40
12	Colón	40	14	11	15	60	59	+1	39
13	Atlanta	40	10	17	13	49	56	−7	37
14	Estudiantes (LP)	40	13	10	17	59	51	+8	36
15	Huracán	40	11	13	16	47	46	+1	35
16	Vélez Sarsfield	40	10	15	15	35	39	−4	35
17	All Boys	40	10	11	19	34	58	−24	31
18	Chacarita Juniors	40	11	9	20	39	69	−30	31
19	Platense	40	8	14	18	41	63	−22	30
20	Banfield	40	7	15	18	43	66	−23	29
21	Estudiantes (BA)	40	8	13	19	43	73	−30	29

== Nacional Championship ==
=== Group A ===
Nacional
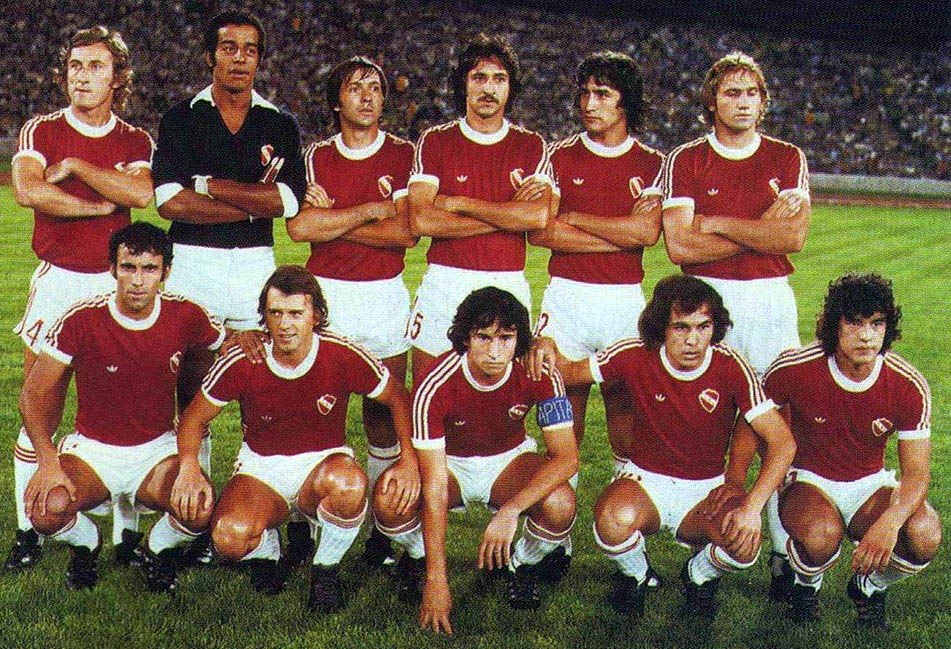
- Independiente, Nacional champions
- Season: 1978
- Champions: Independiente (12th title)
- 1979 Copa Libertadores: Independiente
- Top goalscorer: (Argentina) José Reinaldi (16 goals)

Pos	Team	Pld	W	D	L	GF	GA	GD	Pts
1	Talleres (C)	14	9	3	2	37	17	+20	21
2	Racing	14	8	3	3	21	14	+7	19
3	Newell's Old Boys	14	7	4	3	27	19	+8	18
4	Ledesma	14	5	5	4	23	22	+1	15
5	Ferro Carril Oeste	14	6	3	5	23	22	+1	15
6	Estudiantes (LP)	14	5	0	9	28	31	−3	10
7	All Boys	14	2	6	6	16	26	−10	10
8	Juventud Antoniana	14	0	4	10	16	40	−24	4

=== Group B ===
Pos	Team	Pld	W	D	L	GF	GA	GD	Pts
1	Unión	14	9	3	2	22	6	+16	21
2	Huracán	14	7	5	2	31	18	+13	19
3	Atlético Tucumán	14	8	3	3	24	12	+12	19
4	Boca Juniors	14	7	1	6	19	25	−6	15
5	Patronato	14	4	5	5	17	21	−4	13
6	Chacarita Juniors	14	4	4	6	20	23	−3	12
7	Gimnasia y Esgrima (M)	14	4	2	8	17	25	−8	10
8	Platense	14	0	3	11	9	29	−20	3

=== Group C ===
Pos	Team	Pld	W	D	L	GF	GA	GD	Pts
1	Independiente	14	9	3	2	31	16	+15	21
2	Vélez Sarsfield	14	8	5	1	20	14	+6	21
3	Gimnasia y Esgrima (LP)	14	6	5	3	22	13	+9	17
4	Racing (C)	14	5	4	5	17	16	+1	14
5	Deportivo Roca	14	5	4	5	12	14	−2	14
6	Rosario Central	14	2	6	6	9	14	−5	10
7	Argentinos Juniors	14	4	1	9	17	26	−9	9
8	Altos Hornos Zapla	14	1	4	9	14	29	−15	6

=== Group D ===
Pos	Team	Pld	W	D	L	GF	GA	GD	Pts
1	River Plate	14	10	3	1	35	13	+22	23
2	Colón	14	7	3	4	23	15	+8	17
3	San Martín (M)	14	7	2	5	22	22	0	16
4	Atlanta	14	3	7	4	22	23	−1	13
5	San Martín (T)	14	4	4	6	24	22	+2	12
6	Quilmes	14	4	3	7	16	27	−11	11
7	Alvarado	14	3	4	7	20	28	−8	10
8	San Lorenzo	14	3	4	7	13	25	−12	10

=== Quarterfinals ===
Team 1	Agg.	Team 2	1st leg	2nd leg
Colón	2–4	Independiente	2–2	0–2
Huracán	2–4	Talleres	2–1	0–3
River Plate	3–2	Vélez Sársfield	2–0	1–2
Racing	1–3	Unión	1–2	0–1

=== Semifinals ===
Team 1	Agg.	Team 2	1st leg	2nd leg
Independiente	4–2	Talleres (C)	2–1	2–1
Unión (SF)	1–2	River Plate	0–1	1–1

=== Final ===
Team 1	Agg.	Team 2	1st leg	2nd leg
River Plate	0–2	Independiente	0–0	0–2

==== First leg ====
1978 Campeonato Nacional Final
7 January 1979
First leg

River Plate	0–0	Independiente
	Report

River Plate, Buenos Aires

==== Second leg ====
10 January 1979
Second leg

Independiente	2–0	River Plate
Bochini 19', 54'	Report

Independiente Stadium, Avellaneda
Attendance: 43,422
Referee: (Argentina) Jorge Romero

Independiente	River Plate

GK	1	(Argentina) Héctor Baley
DF	4	(Argentina) Rubén Pagnanini	(substituted off) 75'
DF	2	(Argentina) Hugo Villaverde
DF	6	(Argentina) Enzo Trossero
DF	3	(Argentina) Osvaldo Pérez
MF	8	(Argentina) Omar Larrosa
MF	5	(Argentina) Carlos Fren
MF	10	(Argentina) Ricardo Bochini
FW	7	(Uruguay) Antonio Alzamendi	(substituted off) 71'
FW	9	(Argentina) Norberto Outes
FW	11	(Argentina) Alejandro Barberón
Substitutes:
DF		(Argentina) Juan M. Insaurralde	(substituted on) 75'
DF		(Argentina) Ricardo Fontana	(substituted on) 71'
Manager:
(Argentina) José Pastoriza

GK	1	(Argentina) Ubaldo Fillol
DF	4	(Argentina) Eduardo Saporiti
DF	2	(Argentina) José Luis Pavoni
DF	6	(Argentina) Daniel Passarella
DF	3	(Argentina) Héctor López
MF	8	(Argentina) Juan José López
MF	5	(Argentina) Reinaldo Merlo
MF	10	(Argentina) Norberto Alonso
FW	7	(Argentina) Pedro A. González	(substituted off) 57'
FW	9	(Argentina) Leopoldo Luque
FW	11	(Argentina) Oscar Ortiz
Substitutes:
FW		(Argentina) Rubén Galletti	(substituted on) 57'
Manager:
(Argentina) Ángel Labruna
