= Hugo Villaverde =

Argentine footballer (1954–2024)

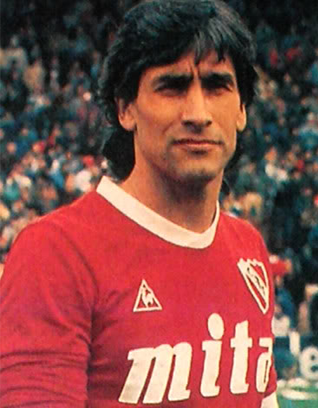
- Villaverde in 1987

Personal information
- Full name: Hugo Eduardo Villaverde
- Date of birth: 27 January 1954
- Place of birth: Santa Fe, Argentina
- Date of death: 17 November 2024 (aged 70)
- Height: 1.78 m (5 ft 10 in)
- Position: Central defender

Senior career*
Years	Team	Apps	(Gls)
1973–1975	Colón de Santa Fe	57	(0)
1976–1989	Independiente	380	(0)
Total		437	(0)

International career
1979	Argentina	6	(0)
- * Club domestic league appearances and goals

Hugo Eduardo Villaverde (27 January 1954 – 17 November 2024) was an Argentine football who played as a central defender, spending most of his career with Independiente. He holds the record in Argentina for most first division matches without scoring a goal, ahead of Jorge Titonell who in the 1930s and 1940s played 405 matches for Talleres (Remedios de Escalada) and Huracán.

== Career ==
Villaverde started his professional playing career in 1973 with home town club Colón de Santa Fe at the age of 19.

In 1975, he joined Independiente where he became a key player throughout the 1970s and 1980s. He won four Argentine Primera titles, the 1984 Copa Libertadores and Copa Intercontinental with the club.

Villaverde played for the Argentina national team in 1979, but never returned to the international scene after suffering an injury in friendly match against Scotland.

== Personal life and death ==
Villaverde's nephew, Alejandro "Papu" Gómez, is also a professional footballer who has played for the Argentina national team.

Villaverde died on 17 November 2024, at the age of 70.

== Honours ==
Independiente

- Primera División Argentina: 1977 Nacional, 1978 Nacional, 1983 Metropolitano, 1988–89
- Copa Libertadores: 1984
- Copa Intercontinental: 1984
