= Juan Álvarez (footballer, born 1948) =

Mexican footballer (1948–2025)

Personal information
- Full name: Juan Manuel Álvarez Álvarez
- Date of birth: 12 April 1948
- Place of birth: Mexico City, Mexico
- Date of death: 2 July 2025 (aged 77)
- Position: Centre-back

Senior career*
Years	Team	Apps	(Gls)
1972–1977	Atlético Español		
1977–1985	Tecos UAG	195	(11)

International career
1973–1981	Mexico	6	(0)
- * Club domestic league appearances and goals

Juan Manuel Álvarez Álvarez (Spanish: [ˈxwam manˈwel ˈalβaɾes]; 12 April 1948 – 2 July 2025) was a Mexican football player and manager. A centre-back, he played professionally in the Primera División de México from 1972 to 1985 with Atlético Español and Tecos UAG. He also competed in the men's tournament at the 1972 Summer Olympics. After his playing career, he worked as a manager, serving in that role with Correcaminos UAT, Tecos UAG, Celaya, Toluca, Veracruz, Ángeles de Puebla, Halcones de Querétaro and Deportivo Saprissa. While at Celaya F.C., he led them to a second-place finish in the Primera División in 1995–96.

== Early life and playing career ==
Álvarez was born on 12 April 1948 in Mexico City. He was a standout centre-back. He played at an amateur level for the club Celta FC before making the professional ranks in 1972 with the local team Atlético Español in the Primera División de México (now Liga MX). He played with Atlético Español from 1972 to 1977 before spending the rest of his career with Tecos UAG, where he played from 1977 to 1985. In 1975, while he was at Atlético Español, the club won the 1975 CONCACAF Champions' Cup. Across eight seasons at Tecos UAG, Álvarez played 195 matches and scored 11 goals, with a career-high six goals during the 1977–78 season, his first with them. In 1980–81, he helped them finish first in league standings.

Nicknamed "El Capi", Álvarez also played with the national team. He participated at the 1972 Summer Olympics in Munich, helping the Mexican team to a seventh-place finish. He was called up to the Mexico national team in 1973 and appeared in one match, then eight years later received another call-up and played five matches.

== Coaching career and later life ==
After retiring as a player, Álvarez went in to coaching in 1988, becoming coach of Correcaminos UAT. He managed Tecos UAG from 1989 to 1990 and Atlético Cuernavaca from 1993 to 1994. In 1994, he became manager for Celaya, then in the Mexican second-tier. He led them to the Primera División A de México title in 1994–95, thus achieving promotion to the first-tier. He then assembled a team including players Emilio Butragueño and Hugo Sánchez and led them to one of their best seasons in 1995–96. They reached the finals of the league tournament, but lost to Club Necaxa through the away goals rule. Afterwards, team fans called Álvarez by the nickname the "king without a crown".

After his stint with Celaya, Álvarez managed Toluca from 1996 to 1997, Veracruz in 1998, Ángeles de Puebla from 1999 to 2000, and Halcones de Querétaro from 2000 to 2001. He then worked as an assistant with Jaguares F.C. from 2003 to 2004 and Pachuca in 2005 before a return to Jaguares from 2005 to 2006. He assisted Tigres UANL in 2006, Club Necaxa in 2007 and Tecos UAG in 2008. From 2009 to 2010, he served as vice president for Jaguares, and he concluded his career as manager of Deportivo Saprissa in Costa Rica from 2010 to 2011.

Álvarez died on 2 July 2025, at the age of 77.
