= Enzo Trossero =

Argentine footballer

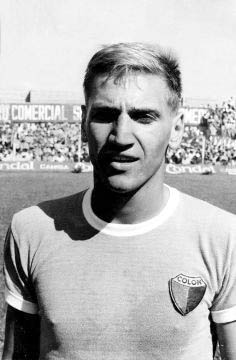
- An early Enzo Trossero in Colón de Santa Fe

Personal information
- Full name: Enzo Héctor Trossero
- Date of birth: 23 May 1953 (age 73)
- Place of birth: Esmeralda, Argentina
- Position: Defender

Senior career*
Years	Team	Apps	(Gls)
1971–1972	Sportivo Belgrano		
1972–1975	Colón de Santa Fe	101	(3)
1975–1986	Independiente	308	(55)
1979–1981	→ Nantes (loan)	69	(12)
1986	Toluca		
1986–1987	Estudiantes	20	(4)
1987–1988	Sion		
1989	Estudiantes	0	(0)

International career
1977–1985	Argentina	27	(0)

Managerial career
- 1987–1989: Argentina U-20 (assistant)
- 1989–1990: Argentina U-16 (assistant)
- 1990–1992: Sion
- 1992–1994: Huracán
- 1994–1995: Estudiantes
- 1995–1997: Colón
- 1997–1998: San Martín Tucumán
- 1999: Lugano
- 1999–2001: Switzerland
- 2001–2002: Independiente
- 2002: Talleres de Córdoba
- 2004–2007: Municipal
- 2007–2009: Al Shabab
- 2009: Godoy Cruz
- 2010: Al-Ittihad
- 2011: Al Shabab
- 2015: Municipal
- * Club domestic league appearances and goals

Enzo Héctor Trossero (born 23 May 1953), nicknamed El Vikingo (the Viking), is an Argentine footballer and coach.

== Club career ==
He began his playing career at Argentine minnows Belgrano de San Francisco but he soon moved on to Colón de Santa Fe, and in 1975 he arrived at Independiente. In this team he had two phases: from 1975 to 1979, when he was transferred to FC Nantes Atlantique of France, and from 1981 to 1985. During that time he won three Argentine titles (1977–78 and 1983), a Copa Libertadores (1984) and an Intercontinental Cup (1984). He was named as one of the club's best defender during Independiente's 90th anniversary.

== International career ==
He had great attacking prowess for a defender, he scored 55 goals in 308 games during his time with Independiente. He made the Argentina national football team for the 1982 FIFA World Cup in Spain, but he did not manage to play in any game. He played in the qualifying matches for the 1986 FIFA World Cup, but he was not called for the tournament itself.

== Coaching career ==
During his coaching career he has coached Club Atlético Huracán, Talleres de Córdoba, and his former club Independiente de Avellaneda. Abroad he has coached in Switzerland where he was league champion with FC Sion and also coached the Swiss national team. He coached in Guatemala with C.S.D. Municipal and won the UNCAF Club Tournament and a record 5 straight league championships. On 4 November 2009 Godoy Cruz Antonio Tomba officials have hired the coach to replace Diego Cocca, Trossero recently quit Saudi Arabian club Al Shabab. On 29 December 2009 Godoy Cruz Antonio Tomba officials have fired the coach after just six matches due to poor results: three draws and three losses. As replacement was named Trossero's assistant Daniel Ondra, the club is but in negotiation with former Gimnasia y Esgrima La Plata coach Leonardo Madelón.

== Honours ==
Independiente

- Nacional: 1977, 1978
- Metropolitano: 1983
- Copa Interamericana: 1976
- Copa Libertadores: 1984
- Intercontinental Cup: 1984

Nantes

- Ligue 1: 1980
