= Carlos Fren =

Argentine footballer and manager

Personal information
- Full name: Carlos Guillermo Fren
- Date of birth: December 27, 1954 (age 71)
- Place of birth: Argentina
- Position: Midfielder

Senior career*
Years	Team	Apps	(Gls)
1973–1978	Argentinos Juniors	195	(13)
1978–1982	Independiente	103	(2)
1982	Racing Club	11	(0)
1983	Everest	3	(0)
1983	Nueva Chicago	19	(0)
1984–1985	Vélez Sársfield	56	(0)
?	Atlanta		
?	Tigre		

Managerial career
- 1991: Independiente
- 1994: Deportivo Mandiyú
- 1995: Racing Club
- 1996: Argentinos Juniors
- 2005: Instituto de Córdoba
- 2007: 12 de Octubre
- * Club domestic league appearances and goals as of 2009

Carlos Fren (born 27 December 1954) is an Argentine former footballer and manager. He spent most of his playing career in Argentinos Juniors and Independiente. He has also managed these clubs.

== Playing career ==
Fren began his playing career in 1973 with Argentinos Juniors. Between 1976 and 1978 he played alongside teenage sensation Diego Maradona in the Argentinos midfield. He made over 200 appearances for the Paternal club before joining Independiente in 1978.

Fren played 103 league games for independiente before leaving to join their fiercest rivals Racing Club in 1982. In 1980, he was included in the Argentina squad for the 1980 Mundialito.

After a short stint with Nueva Chicago in 1983 he joined Vélez Sársfield where he played 56 league games between 1984 and 1985.

Towards the end of his playing career he had stints with Atlanta and Tigre in the lower leagues of Argentine football and Everest of Ecuador.

== Managerial career ==
Fren began coaching in the youth teams of Nueva Chicago and Vélez Sársfield. His first first team appointment was his former club Independiente in 1991. In 1994, he teamed up with Diego Maradona as joint manager of Deportivo Mandiyú. In 1995, the pair had another unsuccessful attempt at management with Racing Club.

In 1996, Fren notoriously spent a single game in charge of Argentinos Juniors before resigning.

From there, Fren went on to coach the reserve team of Talleres de Córdoba and then work as assistant coach to José Pastoriza at Independiente. In between 2004 and 2005, he worked with Luis Garisto at Instituto de Córdoba and in 2007, he had a spell in charge of 12 de Octubre of Paraguay.
