= Carlos Monterroso =

Guatemalan footballer

Personal information
- Date of birth: 28 July 1948 (age 78)
- Position: Defender

International career
Years	Team	Apps	(Gls)
- Guatemala

Carlos Monterroso (born 28 July 1948) is a Guatemalan former footballer who played as defender. He competed in the men's tournament at the 1976 Summer Olympics.
