= José Pastoriza =

Argentine footballer (1942–2004)

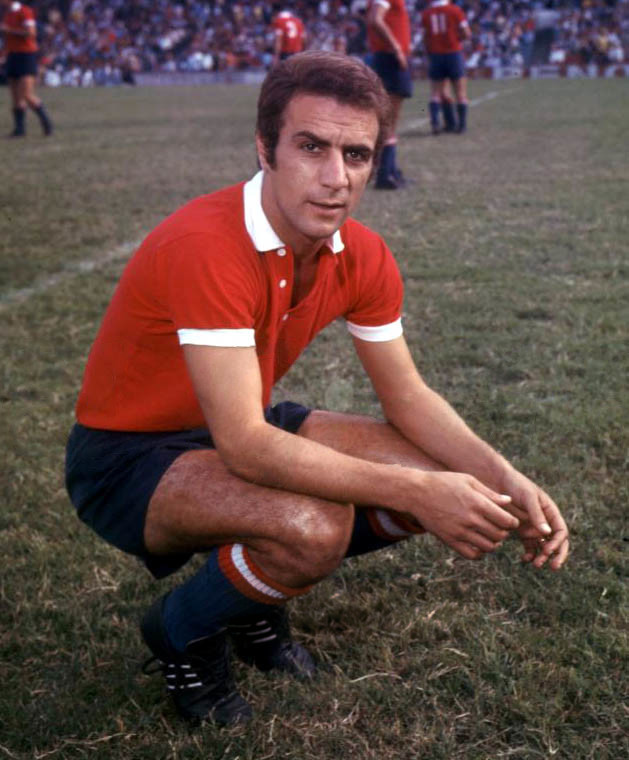
- Pastoriza with Independiente in 1967

Personal information
- Full name: José Omar Pastoriza
- Date of birth: 23 May 1942
- Place of birth: Rosario, Argentina
- Date of death: 2 August 2004 (aged 62)
- Height: 1.85 m (6 ft 1 in)
- Position: Midfielder

Youth career
- Rosario Central
- Colón de Santa Fe

Senior career*
Years	Team	Apps	(Gls)
1964–1965	Racing Club	53	(2)
1966–1972	Independiente	184	(32)
1972–1975	Monaco	106	(36)
Total		343	(70)

International career
1966–1972	Argentina	18	(1)

Managerial career
- 1976–1979: Independiente
- 1980: Talleres de Córdoba
- 1981–1982: Racing Club
- 1982–1983: Millonarios
- 1983–1984: Independiente
- 1985: Fluminense
- 1985–1987: Independiente
- 1988–1989: Boca Juniors
- 1990–1991: Independiente
- 1992: Atlético Madrid
- 1993: Talleres de Córdoba
- 1994: Bolívar
- 1995: Argentinos Juniors
- 1995–1996: El Salvador
- 1998: Talleres de Córdoba
- 1998–2000: Venezuela
- 2003: Talleres de Córdoba
- 2003–2004: Independiente
- * Club domestic league appearances and goals

José Omar Pastoriza (23 May 1942 – 2 August 2004) was an Argentine football player and manager. A midfielder, he played for Independiente, AS Monaco, and the Argentina national team. As a manager, he managed the Venezuela national team among other teams.

== Playing career ==
El Pato ("The Duck") Pastoriza was born in Rosario, and started his career in Rosario Central, but gained renown with Colón de Santa Fe. He moved to Racing Club, but was transferred to rival Independiente after 53 matches due to a poor team performance and the precarious economic situation. He stayed six years with Independiente, winning three first division tournaments and a Copa Libertadores. In 1971, he was awarded the Olimpia de Oro, which is given to the Argentine footballer of the year.

After the 1972 season he transferred to Ligue 1 AS Monaco, where he retired as a player.

== Coaching career ==
Having good relations with players, El Pato Pastoriza coached the a number of clubs in Argentina, Colombia, Brazil, Bolivia and Spain, as well as the El Salvador and Venezuela national teams. Pastoriza began his managerial career in 1976 with Independiente, the club where he won another three national leagues, another Libertadores Cup and the Intercontinental Cup in 1984. He also worked as the manager of Talleres de Córdoba on many occasions. He had a single stint as manager of several Argentine clubs such as Racing Club, Boca Juniors and Argentinos Juniors. Pastoriza's first foreign appointment was in 1982, at the Colombian Club Deportivo Los Millonarios. He was manager of Brazilian team Fluminense (1985) before returning to Argentina.

In 1992, he worked as manager of the Spanish Atlético Madrid, and in 1994 he worked with Bolivian Club Bolívar. Pastoriza served as the coach of the El Salvador national team between 1995 and 1996 and as the coach of Venezuela between 1998 and 2000.

In 2004, he died in Buenos Aires during his fifth stint as manager of Independiente. He had a heart attack at his apartment, and the emergency doctors could not save him. Pastoriza had a history of health problems, but kept smoking anyway. The funeral was performed at the Independiente headquarters.

Jairo Castillo, player of Independiente, was repeatedly booked by the referee in later games for removing his shirt to reveal tributes to Pastoriza. As a result, it was decided to add Pastoriza's nickname "Pato" to the official Independiente kit in 2004.

== Career statistics ==
=== Club ===
Appearances and goals by club, season and competition
Club	Season	League			National cup		League cup		Continental		Total	
Club	Season	Division	Apps	Goals	Apps	Goals	Apps	Goals	Apps	Goals	Apps	Goals
Colón de Santa Fe	1962	Primera División	0	0	—		—		0	0	0	0
Colón de Santa Fe	1963	Primera División	0	0	—		—		0	0	0	0
Colón de Santa Fe	Total		0	0	—		—		0	0	0	0
Racing Club	1964	Primera División	24	0	—		—					
Racing Club	1965	Primera División	29	2	—		—					
Racing Club	Total		53	2	—		—					
Independiente	1966	Primera División	24	1	—		—					
Independiente	1967	Primera División	25	2	—		—					
Independiente	1968	Primera División	22	2	—		—					
Independiente	1969	Primera División	31	7	—		—					
Independiente	1970	Primera División	21	1	—		—					
Independiente	1971	Primera División	46	15	—		—					
Independiente	1972	Primera División	14	2	—		—					
Independiente	Total		183	30	—		—					
Monaco	1972–73	Division 1	26	12								
Monaco	1972–73	Division 1	21	10								
Monaco	1974–75	Division 1	33	12								
Monaco	1975–76	Division 1	26	2								
Monaco	Total		106	36								
Career total			342	68								

=== International ===
Appearances and goals by national team and year
National team	Year	Apps	Goals
Argentina	1970	2	0
Argentina	1971	8	0
Argentina	1972	6	1
Total		16	1

== Honours ==
=== Player ===
Independiente

- Argentine Primera División: Nacional 1967, Metropolitano 1970, Metropolitano 1971
- Copa Libertadores: 1972

Individual

- Footballer of the Year of Argentina: 1971

=== Manager ===
Independiente

- Argentine Primera División: Nacional 1977, Nacional 1978, Metropolitano 1983
- Copa Libertadores: 1984
- Intercontinental Cup: 1984
