= Atlético Español F.C. =

Atlético Español FC
- Full name: Atlético Español Fútbol Club
- Nickname: Toros (Bulls)
- Founded: 19 September 1971; 55 years ago
- Dissolved: 21 July 1982; 44 years ago
- Ground: Estadio Azteca
- Capacity: 114,600
- Chairman: (Spain) Duarte Mendietta Xequiz (1971–1982)
- League: Primera División de México (1971–1982)
Home colours	Away colours

Atlético Español Fútbol Club, was a professional football club based in Mexico City. From 1971 to 1982, the club competed in Primera División, the top division of Mexican football, and played its home matches at Estadio Azteca. Founded in 1971, when a group of Spanish entrepreneurs acquired the franchise of Necaxa. The club was dissolved in 1982, after the franchise was acquired by Televisa.

== History ==
Atlético Español was founded on 19 September 1971, when a group of Spanish entrepreneurs and business people bought the franchise of Necaxa and change their name to Atlético Español. The reason for the name change was due to their nationality and ideology in the world of business. The branded club were modeled on the defunct club Real Club España, with a similar name and kit to the predecessor. The club would immediately obtain the nickname Toros because in their badge was a bull next a football and the initials AE.

Atlético Español characterized itself to be a team which was a fighter, but their start was not the ideal one since in the 1971–72 season they were a point away from descending to the 2nd division. Other teams fighting to avoid relegation that season were C.F. Torreón, Irapuato and Veracruz, in the end Irapuato would be the club to be relegated. For the 1972–73 season Atlético Español would reach the semifinals against Club León losing 5–4 in the third leg going all the way to penalties.

In the 1973–74 season, they would reach the final against Cruz Azul. They would play a two legged tie in which Atlético Español would win the first leg 2–1 but lose the second 3–0, finished as runners-up.

Atlético Español would win their first and only international title in the 1975 CONCACAF Champions' Cup, defeating Transvaal 5–1 on aggregate.

In 1976, the club disputed the Copa Interamericana against Club Atlético Independiente. Both matches were played in Buenos Aires and after an aggregate score of 2–2 penalties needed to take place, losing the penalty shootout 4–2.

Season 1980–81 Español would once again get into the liguilla getting 4th in group A led by Cruz Azul, who would lose the final against Pumas de la UNAM. For the season of 1981–82 they would dispute their ultimate ligulla getting to the quarterfinals versus Club de Fútbol Atlante, round they would lose 5–3 in aggregate.

After 11 years as Atlético Español, the club owners unexpectedly sold the franchise, which was acquired by the Mexican television network Televisa. On July 21, 1982, the name and colours reverted to that of Necaxa, hoping to revive the tradition the team had left in Mexico City.

=== Statistics ===
These are the statistics of Atlético Español in the Primera División de México:

GP	W	D	L	GF	GA	Pts	DIF
429	148	134	147	588	586	430	2

In Copa México:

Old Badge

GP	W	D	L	GF	GA	Pts	DIF
30	15	4	11	62	50	34	12

- GP – Games Played
- W – Win
- D – Draw
- L- Loss
- GF – Goals in Favour
- GC – Goles en Contra GA – Goals Against
- Pts – Points
- DIF – Goal Difference

== Honours ==
=== Domestic ===
Type	Competition	Titles	Winning years	Runners-up
Top division	Primera División	0	—	1973–74

=== International ===
Type	Competition	Titles	Winning years	Runners-up
Intercontinental; CONCACAF; CONMEBOL	Copa Interamericana	0	—	1976
Continental; CONCACAF	CONCACAF Champions Cup	1	1975	—

== International record ==
Season	Competition	Round	Club	Home	Away	Aggregate
1975	CONCACAF Champions' Cup	Second round	(Mexico) Monterrey	1–1	1–0	2–1
1975	CONCACAF Champions' Cup	Semi-finals	(Costa Rica) Saprissa	2–1	2–1	4–2
1975	CONCACAF Champions' Cup	Final	(Suriname) Transvaal	2–1	3–0	5–1
1976	Copa Interamericana	Final	(Argentina) Independiente	0–0	2–2	2–2 (2–4 p)
