= Copa Interamericana =

Copa Interamericana Interamerican Cup
- The trophy awarded to champions
- Organizer(s): CONCACAF; CONMEBOL
- Founded: 1968
- Abolished: 1998; 28 years ago
- Region: Americas
- Teams: 2
- Last champion: (United States) D.C. United (1st title)
- Most championships: (Argentina) Independiente (3 titles)

The Copa Interamericana (English: Interamerican Cup) was an international football competition endorsed by CONCACAF (North, Central America and Caribbean) and CONMEBOL (South America). Established in 1969, it was discontinued in 1998 after CONCACAF clubs, particularly those from Mexico, began participating in CONMEBOL competitions.

The competition was intended to be contested between the winners of the North American CONCACAF Champions Cup and the South American Copa Libertadores tournaments, although the participants varied at times. The competition was usually contested over a two legged tie, with a playoff or penalty kicks if necessary, but it was common for several consecutive editions to go unheld. Of the 18 competitions played out, four of them were contested over several matches in just one venue. Two others were held in a single match. Another two editions had participants that didn't outright qualify to dispute the competition. Most of the editions were held one, and sometimes two, years after the participants had qualified. This was the result of the lack of financial incentives and the low relevance of the competition.

The 18 Copa Interamericana tournaments were won by 13 different club teams. Argentine side Independiente won a record three titles. The last winner of the cup was American side D.C. United, defeating Brazilian side Vasco da Gama 2–1 on aggregate in 1998. Argentina was the most successful national league with seven titles, while Uruguayan outfit Nacional and Independiente share the record for the most appearances with three each.

== History ==
In 1969, an agreement came between the confederations of South America (CONMEBOL) and Central and North America (CONCACAF) to play an annual competition, the Interamerican Cup, which pits the champions of those two confederations in a format similar to the Intercontinental Cup. The first edition was contested between Estudiantes and Mexican club Toluca in which each team won 2–1 in their away legs. The playoff in Montevideo proved to be the tie-breaker as Estudiantes won a violent match 2–0. This promising start did little to help the competition; due to the difference in interests between the clubs involved, the Interamerican Cup had an even more sporadic lifeline than the Intercontinental Cup; sometimes, years would go without it being played. The second edition was played four years later, in 1971, which saw Nacional edged Mexican side Cruz Azul 3–2 on aggregate. Independiente would become the only club to win the competition three times in a row, from 1972 to 1974, after seeing off Honduran club Olimpia, Guatemalan club Municipal and Mexican side Atlético Español, the last two after a penalty shoot-out. Mexico's América broke the South American hegemony after beating Boca Juniors in a play-off match in 1977. As a result of this victory, the Mexican squad argued that it had the right to participate in the Intercontinental Cup of that year; however, they were denied the opportunity. Paraguay's Olimpia returned the trophy back south in 1980 with a victory over El Salvador's FAS but Club Universidad Nacional of Mexico City defeating Uruguay's Nacional to win CONCACAF's second title.

The competition entered a state of hiatus again, this time for five years. In 1986, Argentinos Juniors would defeat Defence Force of Trinidad and Tobago in a single-match final. River Plate would keep the trophy in Argentina, for the second year running, defeating Costa Rican side Alajuelense. Uruguay's Nacional would trounce Honduras' Olimpia 5-1 on aggregate the following year. Colombia's Atlético Nacional made short work of Club Universidad Nacional; however, South America hegemony would once again be broken by América after defeating Paraguay's Olimpia. Compatriots Puebla failed to retain the trophy in Mexico after being routed by Chile's Colo-Colo. The importance of the competition decreased significantly after two Brazilian clubs, Copa Libertadores winners São Paulo (1993) and Grêmio (1995) declined to participate out of disinterest; both times, the Copa Libertadores runners-up, Chilean side Universidad Católica and Atlético Nacional took their place; each of them were pushed to the limit by Costa Rica's Saprissa. Vélez Sársfield beat Costa Rican club Cartaginés in 1994 while the last Interamerican Cup, held in 1998, saw American club D.C. United beat Vasco da Gama.

The Interamerican Cup was abolished in 1998 when Mexican clubs began to participate in the Copa Libertadores and other CONCACAF teams participated in the Copa Sudamericana. From 2005 to 2023, when FIFA adopted the Club World Championship format clash between the champions of all continental confederations, the champions of CONCACAF and CONMEBOL again had the opportunity to meet, which happened on multiple occasions throughout the history of the tournament with this format.

In January 2023, CONCACAF and CONMEBOL had signed a new strategic partnership, which would include a "final four" style club tournament containing two teams from both confederations that would start in 2024. This event was not held however beginning in 2024, the annual FIFA Intercontinental Cup has included a match between the champions of each confederation dubbed Derby of the Americas.

== Records and statistics ==
=== List of finals ===
Key to the list
a.e.t.	Match was won during extra time
p.	Match was won on a penalty shoot-out

Ed.	Year	Winners	Sco./Agg.	Runners-up	1st leg	2nd leg	Play-off	
Ed.	1	1969	(Argentina) Estudiantes (LP)	6–3	(Mexico) Toluca	2–1	1–2	3–0
2	1971	(Uruguay) Nacional	3–2	(Mexico) Cruz Azul	1–1	2–1	–	
3	1973	(Argentina) Independiente	4–1	(Honduras) Olimpia	2–1	2–0	–	
4	1974	(Argentina) Independiente	1–1 (4–2 p)	(Guatemala) Municipal	1–0	0–1	–	
5	1976	(Argentina) Independiente	2–2 (4–2 p)	(Mexico) Español	2–2	0–0	–	
6	1978	(Mexico) América	~~1–3~~ (Note: Aggregate score not taken into account.)	(Argentina) Boca Juniors	0–3	1–0	2–1 (a.e.t.)	
7	1979	(Paraguay) Olimpia	8–3	(El Salvador) FAS	3–3	5–0	–	
8	1981	(Mexico) UNAM	6–5	(Uruguay) Nacional	3–1	1–3	2–1	
9	1985	(Argentina) Argentinos Juniors	1–0 (Note: Final was played under a single match format.)	(Trinidad and Tobago) Defence Force	–			
10	1986	(Argentina) River Plate	3–0	(Costa Rica) Alajuelense	0–0	3–0	–	
11	1988	(Uruguay) Nacional	5–1	(Honduras) Olimpia	1–1	4–0	–	
12	1989	(Colombia) Atlético Nacional	6–1	(Mexico) UNAM	2–0	4–1	–	
13	1990	(Mexico) América	3–2	(Paraguay) Olimpia	1–1	2–1	–	
14	1991	(Chile) Colo-Colo	7–2	(Mexico) Puebla	4–1	3–1	–	
15	1993	(Chile) Universidad Católica	6–4	(Costa Rica) Saprissa	1–3	5–1	–	
16	1996	(Argentina) Vélez Sársfield	2–0	(Costa Rica) Cartaginés	0–0	2–0	–	
17	1997	(Colombia) Atlético Nacional	3–2	(Costa Rica) Saprissa	–			
18	1998	(United States) D.C. United	2–1	(Brazil) Vasco da Gama	0–1	2–0	–	

=== Performances by club ===
Team	Winners	Runners-up	Years won	Years runners-up
(Argentina) Independiente	3	0	1972, 1974, 1975	
(Uruguay) Nacional	2	1	1971, 1988	1980
(Mexico) América	2	0	1977, 1990	
(Colombia) Atlético Nacional	2	0	1989, 1995	
(Paraguay) Olimpia	1	1	1979	1990
(Mexico) UNAM	1	1	1981	1989
(Argentina) Estudiantes	1	0	1968	
(Argentina) Argentinos Juniors	1	0	1985	
(Argentina) River Plate	1	0	1986	
(Chile) Colo-Colo	1	0	1991	
(Chile) Universidad Católica	1	0	1993	
(Argentina) Vélez Sársfield	1	0	1994	
(United States) D.C. United	1	0	1998	
(Honduras) Olimpia	0	2		1972, 1988
(Costa Rica) Saprissa	0	2		1993, 1995
(Mexico) Toluca	0	1		1968
(Mexico) Cruz Azul	0	1		1971
(Guatemala) Municipal	0	1		1974
(Mexico) Atlético Español	0	1		1975
(Argentina) Boca Juniors	0	1		1977
(El Salvador) FAS	0	1		1979
(Trinidad and Tobago) Defence Force	0	1		1985
(Costa Rica) Alajuelense	0	1		1986
(Mexico) Puebla	0	1		1991
(Costa Rica) Cartaginés	0	1		1994
(Brazil) Vasco da Gama	0	1		1998

=== By nation ===
Nation	Winners	Runners-up	Total
Argentina	7	1	8
Mexico	3	5	8
Chile	2	0	2
Colombia	2	0	2
Uruguay	2	1	3
Paraguay	1	1	2
United States	1	0	1
Costa Rica	0	4	4
Honduras	0	2	2
Brazil	0	1	1
El Salvador	0	1	1
Guatemala	0	1	1
Trinidad and Tobago	0	1	1

=== By confederation ===
Results by confederation
Confederation	Winners	Runners-up
CONMEBOL	14	4
CONCACAF	4	14

== See also ==
- FIFA Derby of the Americas
