= 1977 Argentine Primera División =

86th season of top-tier football league in Argentina

Primera División
- Season: 1977
- Champions: River Plate (Metropolitano); Independiente (Nacional)

The 1977 Primera División season was the 86th season of top-flight football in Argentina. River Plate won the Metropolitano (17th title) and Independiente achieved the Nacional championship (11th title).

Lanús, Ferro C. Oeste and Temperley were relegated.

== Metropolitano Championship ==
Metropolitano
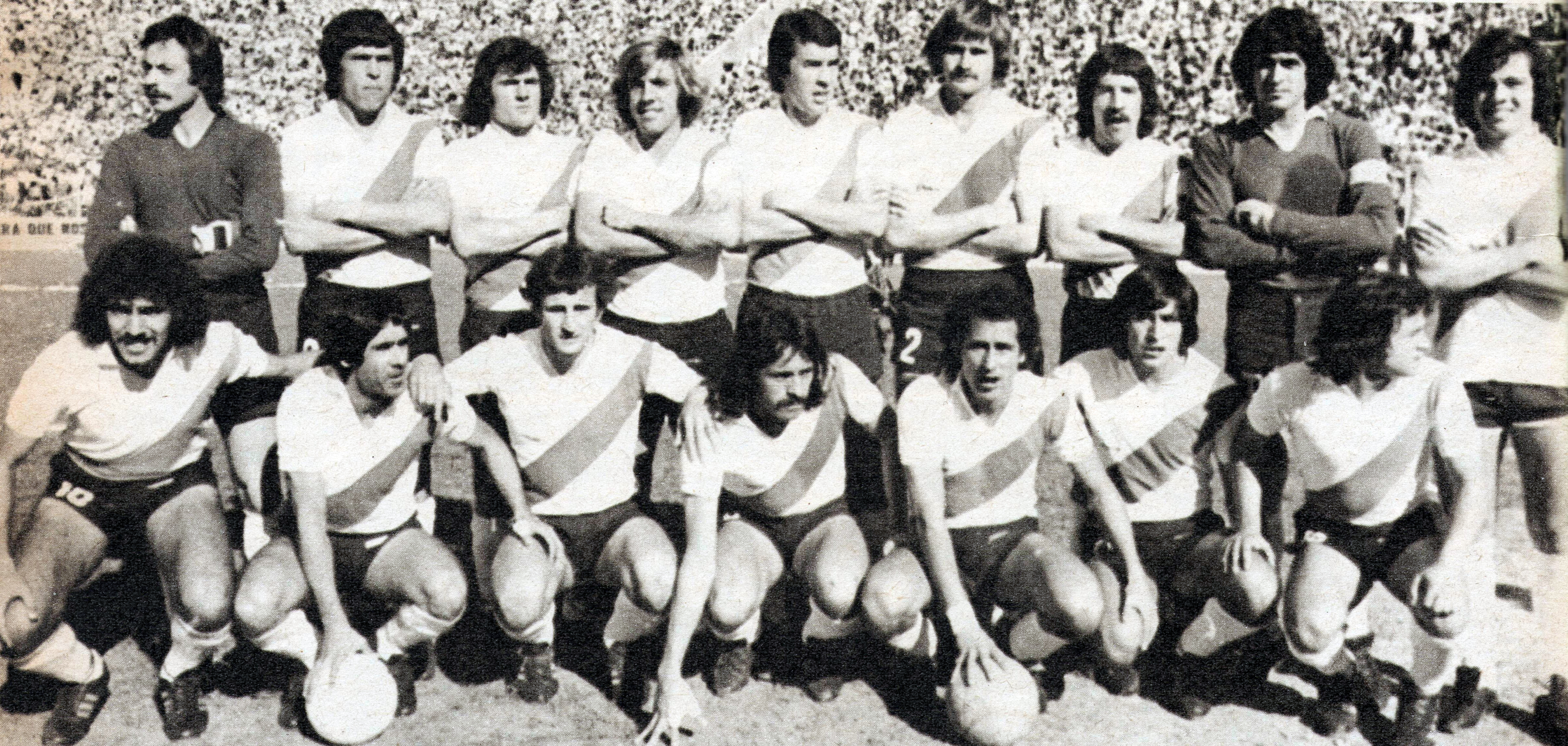
- River Plate, Metropolitano champions
- Season: 1977
- Champions: River Plate (17th title)
- Promoted: Lanús; Platense
- Relegated: Lanús; Ferro C. Oeste; Temperley
- 1978 Copa Libertadores: River Plate
- Top goalscorer: (Argentina) Carlos Álvarez (27 goals)

| Pos | Team | Pld | W | D | L | GF | GA | GD | Pts |
|---|---|---|---|---|---|---|---|---|---|
| 1 | River Plate | 44 | 25 | 13 | 6 | 83 | 46 | +37 | 63 |
| 2 | Independiente | 44 | 23 | 15 | 6 | 82 | 47 | +35 | 61 |
| 3 | Vélez Sársfield | 44 | 19 | 18 | 7 | 65 | 48 | +17 | 56 |
| 4 | Boca Juniors | 44 | 22 | 9 | 13 | 67 | 45 | +22 | 53 |
| 4 | Colón | 44 | 20 | 13 | 11 | 74 | 57 | +17 | 53 |
| 6 | Rosario Central | 44 | 19 | 14 | 11 | 60 | 35 | +25 | 52 |
| 7 | Newell's Old Boys | 44 | 17 | 12 | 15 | 69 | 58 | +11 | 46 |
| 8 | Huracán | 44 | 14 | 16 | 14 | 56 | 59 | −3 | 44 |
| 9 | Argentinos Juniors | 44 | 14 | 15 | 15 | 61 | 61 | 0 | 43 |
| 10 | Unión | 44 | 12 | 18 | 14 | 57 | 55 | +2 | 42 |
| 10 | Estudiantes (LP) | 44 | 13 | 16 | 15 | 60 | 61 | −1 | 42 |
| 12 | Banfield | 44 | 13 | 15 | 16 | 48 | 50 | −2 | 41 |
| 12 | Racing | 44 | 13 | 15 | 16 | 43 | 47 | −4 | 41 |
| 12 | San Lorenzo | 44 | 14 | 13 | 17 | 46 | 56 | −10 | 41 |
| 15 | Gimnasia y Esgrima (LP) | 44 | 15 | 10 | 19 | 75 | 76 | −1 | 40 |
| 15 | Chacarita Juniors | 44 | 12 | 16 | 16 | 53 | 62 | −9 | 40 |
| 15 | Atlanta | 44 | 15 | 10 | 19 | 52 | 65 | −13 | 40 |
| 15 | Quilmes | 44 | 12 | 16 | 16 | 51 | 64 | −13 | 40 |
| 19 | All Boys | 44 | 11 | 17 | 16 | 50 | 67 | −17 | 39 |
| 20 | Platense | 44 | 10 | 18 | 16 | 48 | 66 | −18 | 38 |
| 20 | Lanús | 44 | 11 | 16 | 17 | 43 | 54 | −11 | 38 |
| 22 | Temperley | 44 | 13 | 10 | 21 | 56 | 75 | −19 | 36 |
| 23 | Ferro Carril Oeste | 44 | 5 | 13 | 26 | 50 | 95 | −45 | 23 |

== Nacional Championship ==
Nacional
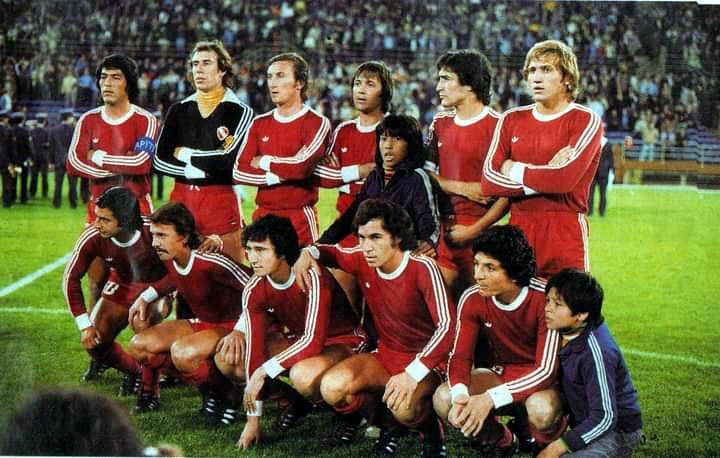
- Independiente, Nacional champions
- Season: 1977
- Champions: Independiente (11th title)
- Promoted: Estudiantes (BA)
- 1978 Copa Libertadores: Independiente
- Top goalscorer: (Argentina) Alfredo Letanú (13 goals)

=== Group A ===
| Pos | Team | Pld | W | D | L | GF | GA | GD | Pts |
|---|---|---|---|---|---|---|---|---|---|
| 1 | Newell's Old Boys | 14 | 8 | 5 | 1 | 33 | 11 | +22 | 21 |
| 2 | San Lorenzo | 14 | 5 | 7 | 2 | 20 | 14 | +6 | 17 |
| 2 | Independiente Rivadavia | 14 | 6 | 5 | 3 | 24 | 20 | +4 | 17 |
| 4 | Gimnasia y Esgrima (LP) | 14 | 4 | 7 | 3 | 21 | 21 | 0 | 15 |
| 5 | San Martín (T) | 14 | 2 | 10 | 2 | 18 | 18 | 0 | 14 |
| 6 | Estudiantes (BA) | 14 | 3 | 6 | 5 | 15 | 22 | −7 | 12 |
| 7 | Banfield | 14 | 3 | 4 | 7 | 17 | 28 | −11 | 10 |
| 8 | Círculo Deportivo (Note: Otamendi is a town in General Alvarado Partido, Buenos Aires Province.) | 14 | 1 | 4 | 9 | 7 | 21 | −14 | 6 |

=== Group B ===
| Pos | Team | Pld | W | D | L | GF | GA | GD | Pts |
|---|---|---|---|---|---|---|---|---|---|
| 1 | Estudiantes (LP) | 14 | 10 | 2 | 2 | 32 | 13 | +19 | 22 |
| 2 | Boca Juniors | 14 | 7 | 3 | 4 | 22 | 16 | +6 | 17 |
| 3 | Rosario Central | 14 | 7 | 2 | 5 | 20 | 13 | +7 | 16 |
| 3 | Los Andes | 14 | 6 | 4 | 4 | 22 | 19 | +3 | 16 |
| 5 | Quilmes | 14 | 5 | 4 | 5 | 10 | 15 | −5 | 14 |
| 6 | Cipolletti | 14 | 6 | 1 | 7 | 20 | 26 | −6 | 13 |
| 7 | Chacarita Juniors | 14 | 4 | 1 | 9 | 20 | 26 | −6 | 9 |
| 8 | Central Norte | 14 | 2 | 1 | 11 | 14 | 32 | −18 | 5 |

=== Group C ===
| Pos | Team | Pld | W | D | L | GF | GA | GD | Pts |
|---|---|---|---|---|---|---|---|---|---|
| 1 | Talleres (C) | 14 | 9 | 2 | 3 | 27 | 20 | +7 | 20 |
| 2 | Racing | 14 | 6 | 5 | 3 | 22 | 12 | +10 | 17 |
| 3 | River Plate | 14 | 7 | 1 | 6 | 32 | 15 | +17 | 15 |
| 3 | Vélez Sársfield | 14 | 6 | 3 | 5 | 27 | 24 | +3 | 15 |
| 5 | Platense | 14 | 5 | 4 | 5 | 25 | 25 | 0 | 14 |
| 6 | Sarmiento (R) | 14 | 4 | 4 | 6 | 18 | 29 | −11 | 12 |
| 7 | Colón | 14 | 4 | 3 | 7 | 22 | 29 | −7 | 11 |
| 8 | Gimnasia y Esgrima (J) | 14 | 3 | 2 | 9 | 7 | 26 | −19 | 8 |

=== Group D ===
| Pos | Team | Pld | W | D | L | GF | GA | GD | Pts |
|---|---|---|---|---|---|---|---|---|---|
| 1 | Independiente | 14 | 10 | 1 | 3 | 30 | 13 | +17 | 21 |
| 2 | Belgrano | 14 | 8 | 3 | 3 | 25 | 18 | +7 | 19 |
| 3 | Huracán | 14 | 6 | 3 | 5 | 25 | 23 | +2 | 15 |
| 4 | Atlanta | 14 | 5 | 3 | 6 | 14 | 15 | −1 | 13 |
| 4 | Argentinos Juniors | 14 | 5 | 3 | 6 | 18 | 21 | −3 | 13 |
| 6 | Unión | 14 | 4 | 4 | 6 | 20 | 23 | −3 | 12 |
| 7 | Ledesma | 14 | 3 | 4 | 7 | 13 | 21 | −8 | 10 |
| 8 | All Boys | 14 | 3 | 3 | 8 | 19 | 30 | −11 | 9 |

=== Semifinals ===
| Club | - | Club | 1st leg | 2nd leg |
|---|---|---|---|---|
| Talleres (C) | - | Newell's Old Boys | 1-1 | 1-0 |
| Estudiantes (LP) | - | Independiente | 1-1 | 1-3 |

=== Final ===
| Club | - | Club | 1st leg | 2nd leg |
|---|---|---|---|---|
| Independiente | - | Talleres (C) | 1–1 | 2–2 |

Independiente won on away goals rule
