= 1966 Copa Libertadores =

7th season of Copa Libertadores

1966 Copa Libertadores de América
Tournament details
- Dates: February 5 - May 20
- Teams: 17 (from 8 confederations)

Final positions
- Champions: (Uruguay) Peñarol (3rd title)
- Runners-up: (Argentina) River Plate

Tournament statistics
- Matches played: 95
- Goals scored: 283 (2.98 per match)
- Top scorer: (Argentina) Daniel Onega (17 goals)

The 1966 Copa Libertadores de América was the seventh edition of the premier South American club football tournament, organized by CONMEBOL. Colombia and Brazil did not send their representatives. This edition became the first club competition of the world to include not just the champions but also the runners-up of each of its participating association. Despite the fact that Colombian and Brazilian clubs did not participate, this tournament saw a record 95 matches being played out to determine the year's champion.

Colombia did not send representatives due to the disagreements between CONMEBOL and the two Colombian football federations (ADEFUTBOL y DIMAYOR). at the time in conflict with each other. Brazilian clubs protested the inclusion of the runners-up of each nation and argued that the tournament should be reserved for national champions. In addition, they gave priority to their interstate tournaments and tours around the world instead, as they were seen more economically rewarding. Not having any economic incentives, CONMEBOL was forced to allow clubs the freedom of whether they participated or not.

After winning each of their home legs, Peñarol and River Plate required a playoff to break the deadlock. The match was played in the Estadio Nacional of Santiago, Chile, on 20 May 1966. River Plate finished the first half 2-0 and was in cruise control towards its first title. The manyas managed to revert the disadvantage to push this match into extra time. With two more goals, the final score of 2-4 meant that Peñarol became the first three-time winners of the competition. The debacle of River Plate in the second half led the club to being taunted by their rivals as gallinas (chickens), a nickname that was eventually adopted also by their own fans in a positive way.

== Qualified teams ==
Country	Team	Qualification method
CONMEBOL (1 berth)	Independiente	1965 Copa Libertadores winners
Argentina (2 berths)	Boca Juniors	1965 Primera División champion
Argentina (2 berths)	River Plate	1965 Primera División runner-up
Bolivia (2 berths)	Deportivo Municipal	1965 Copa Simón Bolívar champion
Bolivia (2 berths)	Jorge Wilstermann	1965 Copa Simón Bolívar runner-up
Chile (2 berths)	Universidad de Chile	1965 Primera División champion
Chile (2 berths)	Universidad Católica	1965 Primera División runner-up
Ecuador (2 berths)	Emelec	1965 Campeonato Ecuatoriano champion
Ecuador (2 berths)	9 de Octubre	1965 Campeonato Ecuatoriano runner-up
Paraguay (2 berths)	Olimpia	1965 Primera División champion
Paraguay (2 berths)	Guaraní	1965 Primera División runner-up
Peru (2 berths)	Alianza Lima	1965 Primera División champion
Peru (2 berths)	Universitario	1965 Primera División runner-up
Uruguay (2 berths)	Peñarol	1965 Primera División champion
Uruguay (2 berths)	Nacional	1965 Primera División runner-up
Venezuela (2 berths)	Lara	1965 Primera División champion
Venezuela (2 berths)	Deportivo Italia	1965 Primera División runner-up

== Draw ==
Sixteen teams were drawn into two groups of six and one group of four. In each group, teams played against each other home-and-away. The top two teams in each group advanced to the Second round. Independiente, the title holders, had a bye to the next round.

Group 1	Group 2	Group 3
Argentina; Peru; Venezuela	Chile; Paraguay	Bolivia; Ecuador; Uruguay

== Tie-breaking criteria ==
At each stage of the tournament teams receive two points for a win, one point for a draw, and no points for a loss. If two or more teams are equal on points, the following criteria will be applied to determine the ranking in the group stage:

1. a one-game playoff;
2. superior goal difference;
3. draw of lots.

== First round ==
Sixteen teams were drawn into two groups of six and one group of four. In each group, teams played against each other home-and-away. The top two teams in each group advanced to the Semifinals. Independiente, the title holders, had a bye to the next round.

=== Group 1 ===
Pos	Team	Pld	W	D	L	GF	GA	GD	Pts	Qualification or relegation	(Argentina) RIV	(Argentina) BOC	(Peru) UNI	(Venezuela) ITA	(Peru) ALI	(Venezuela) LAR
1	(Argentina) River Plate	10	8	1	1	23	8	+15	17	Qualified to the Semifinals		2–1	5–0	2–1	3–2	3–0
2	(Argentina) Boca Juniors	10	7	0	3	19	9	+10	14	Qualified to the Semifinals	2–0		2–0	5–2	0–1	2–1
3	(Peru) Universitario	10	4	3	3	10	13	−3	11		1–1	2–1		1–2	2–0	1–0
4	(Venezuela) Deportivo Italia	10	4	2	4	15	18	−3	10		0–3	1–2	2–2		3–1	1–0
5	(Peru) Alianza Lima	10	2	0	8	9	16	−7	4		0–2	0–1	0–1	1–2		3–0
6	(Venezuela) Lara	10	1	2	7	5	17	−12	4		1–2	0–3	0–0	1–1	2–1	

Legend: Blue = home team win; Yellow = draw; Red = away team win.

February 5, 1966	Universitario (Peru)	2 – 0	(Peru) Alianza Lima	Lima
	Chumpitaz; Challe

February 5, 1966	Lara (Venezuela)	1 – 1	(Venezuela) Deportivo Italia	Barquisimeto
	Paulinho		Nitti

February 8, 1966	Lara (Venezuela)	2 – 1	(Peru) Alianza Lima	Barquisimeto
	Paulinho; Jair		León

February 9, 1966	Deportivo Italia (Venezuela)	2 – 2	(Peru) Universitario	Caracas
	Zeica; Tacoronte		Uribe; Chumpitaz

February 10, 1966	River Plate (Argentina)	2 – 1	(Argentina) Boca Juniors	Buenos Aires
	Sarnari; Bayo		Rojas

February 12, 1966	Deportivo Italia (Venezuela)	3 – 1	(Peru) Alianza Lima	Caracas
	Tacoronte; Zeica; Nitti		Flores

February 12, 1966	Lara (Venezuela)	0 – 0	(Peru) Universitario	Barquisimeto

February 15, 1966	Lara (Venezuela)	1 – 2	(Argentina) River Plate	Barquisimeto
	Didi II		Onega

February 17, 1966	Universitario (Peru)	2 – 1	(Argentina) Boca Juniors	Lima
	Challe; Casaretto		Zarich

February 17, 1966	Deportivo Italia (Venezuela)	0 – 3	(Argentina) River Plate	Caracas
			Onega; Solari; Sarnari

February 19, 1966	Alianza Lima (Peru)	0 – 1	(Argentina) Boca Juniors	Lima
			Rojas

February 23, 1966	Deportivo Italia (Venezuela)	1 – 2	(Argentina) Boca Juniors	Caracas
	Vicente		Zarich; Rojas

February 23, 1966	Universitario (Peru)	1 – 1	(Argentina) River Plate	Lima
	Casaretto		Onega

February 25, 1966	Lara (Venezuela)	0 – 3	(Argentina) Boca Juniors	Barquisimeto
			Rojas; Luna

February 26, 1966	Alianza Lima (Peru)	0 – 2	(Argentina) River Plate	Lima
			Onega; Matosas

March 1, 1966	Alianza Lima (Peru)	1 – 2	(Venezuela) Deportivo Italia	Lima
	Renato (o.g.)		Zeica

March 2, 1966	River Plate (Argentina)	5 – 0	(Peru) Universitario	Buenos Aires
	Onega; Cubilla; Loayza

March 2, 1966	Boca Juniors (Argentina)	2 – 1	(Venezuela) Lara	Buenos Aires
	López; Rojas		Bezerra

March 4, 1966	River Plate (Argentina)	3 – 0	(Venezuela) Lara	Buenos Aires
	Loayza; Delem

March 8, 1966	River Plate (Argentina)	3 – 2	(Peru) Alianza Lima	Buenos Aires
	Loayza; Onega; Zywica		Zegarra

March 8, 1966	Boca Juniors (Argentina)	5 – 2	(Venezuela) Deportivo Italia	Buenos Aires
	Menéndez; Aimonetti; Rojas; Luna		Nitti

March 8, 1966	Universitario (Peru)	1 – 0	(Venezuela) Lara	Lima
	Córdova

March 10, 1966	River Plate (Argentina)	2 – 1	(Venezuela) Deportivo Italia	Buenos Aires
	Loayza; Onega		Nitti

March 10, 1966	Boca Juniors (Argentina)	0 – 1	(Peru) Alianza Lima	Buenos Aires
			Zegarra

March 13, 1966	Alianza Lima (Peru)	3 – 0	(Venezuela) Lara	Lima
	Zegarra; Reyes

March 13, 1966	Universitario (Peru)	1 – 2	(Venezuela) Deportivo Italia	Lima
	Calatayud		Nitti; Tacoronte

March 17, 1966	Deportivo Italia (Venezuela)	1 – 0	(Venezuela) Lara	Caracas
	Nitti

March 18, 1966	Boca Juniors (Argentina)	2 – 0	(Peru) Universitario	Buenos Aires
	Marzolini; Rojas

March 23, 1966	Alianza Lima (Peru)	0 – 1^{[A]}	(Peru) Universitario	Lima
			Uribe

March 24, 1966	Boca Juniors (Argentina)	2 – 0	(Argentina) River Plate	Buenos Aires
	Rojas

=== Group 2 ===
Pos	Team	Pld	W	D	L	GF	GA	GD	Pts	Qualification or relegation	(Chile) CAT	(Paraguay) GUA	(Paraguay) OLI	(Chile) UCH
1	(Chile) Universidad Católica	6	2	3	1	9	5	+4	7	Qualified to the Semifinals		2–0	0–0	2–2
2	(Paraguay) Guaraní	6	2	2	2	9	9	0	6	Qualified to the Semifinals	3–1		2–0	1–1
3	(Paraguay) Olimpia	6	2	2	2	7	10	−3	6		0–4	3–3		2–0
4	Universidad de Chile	6	1	3	2	6	7	−1	5		0–0	2–0	1–2	

Legend: Blue = home team win; Yellow = draw; Red = away team win.

February 27, 1966	Olimpia (Paraguay)	3 – 3	(Paraguay) Guaraní	Asunción
	Apodaca; Torres; González		González; Ivaldi

March 2, 1966	Universidad de Chile	0 – 0	(Chile) Universidad Católica	Santiago

March 5, 1966	Universidad Católica (Chile)	2 – 0	(Paraguay) Guaraní	Santiago
	Gallardo; Tobar

March 5, 1966	Universidad de Chile	1 – 2	(Paraguay) Olimpia	Santiago
	Sánchez		Torres

March 8, 1966	Universidad de Chile	2 – 0	(Paraguay) Guaraní	Santiago
	Marcos; Araya

March 8, 1966	Universidad Católica (Chile)	0 – 0	(Paraguay) Olimpia	Santiago

March 11, 1966	Guaraní (Paraguay)	1 – 1	Universidad de Chile	Asunción
	Arámbulo		Sánchez

March 11, 1966	Olimpia (Paraguay)	0 – 4	(Chile) Universidad Católica	Asunción
			Tobar; Prieto

March 16, 1966	Guaraní (Paraguay)	3 – 1	(Chile) Universidad Católica	Asunción
	Patiño; González; Arámbulo		Fouilloux

March 16, 1966	Olimpia (Paraguay)	2 – 0	Universidad de Chile	Asunción
	Torres; González

March 20, 1966	Universidad Católica (Chile)	2 – 2	Universidad de Chile	Santiago
	Prieto; Fouilloux		Marcos; Campos

March 20, 1966	Guaraní (Paraguay)	2 – 0	(Paraguay) Olimpia	Asunción
	González; Martínez

March 23, 1966 Second place playoff	Guaraní (Paraguay)	2 – 1	(Paraguay) Olimpia	Asunción
	González		González

=== Group 3 ===
Pos	Team	Pld	W	D	L	GF	GA	GD	Pts	Qualification or relegation	(Uruguay) PEÑ	(Uruguay) NAC	(Bolivia) WIL	(Bolivia) MUN	(Ecuador) EME	(Ecuador) 9DO
1	(Uruguay) Peñarol	10	8	0	2	20	10	+10	16	Qualified to the Semifinals		3–0	2–0	3–1	4–1	2–0
2	(Uruguay) Nacional	10	7	1	2	22	10	+12	15	Qualified to the Semifinals	4–0		3–0	4–1	1–0	3–1
3	(Bolivia) Jorge Wilstermann	10	4	2	4	14	14	0	10		1–0	0–0		3–0	2–1	4–1
4	(Bolivia) Deportivo Municipal	10	4	1	5	21	22	−1	9		1–2	3–2	1–1		4–1	5–1
5	(Ecuador) Emelec	10	4	0	6	15	18	−3	8		1–2	0–2	3–1	2–1		2–1
6	(Ecuador) 9 de Octubre	10	1	0	9	13	31	−18	2		1–2	2–3	3–2	3–4	0–4	

Legend: Blue = home team win; Yellow = draw; Red = away team win.

January 30, 1966	Emelec (Ecuador)	2 – 1	(Ecuador) 9 de Octubre	Guayaquil
	Pulido; Lencina		Fernández

January 30, 1966	Deportivo Municipal (Bolivia)	1 – 1	(Bolivia) Jorge Wilstermann	La Paz
	Di Meglio		García

January 30, 1966	Nacional (Uruguay)	4 – 0	(Uruguay) Peñarol	Montevideo
	Morales; Techera; Virgili; Pérez

February 2, 1966	Deportivo Municipal (Bolivia)	3 – 2	(Uruguay) Nacional	La Paz
	Di Meglio; Quevedo		Oyarbide; Virgili

February 2, 1966	Jorge Wilstermann (Bolivia)	1 – 0	(Uruguay) Peñarol	Cochabamba
	García

February 6, 1966	9 de Octubre (Ecuador)	1 – 2	(Uruguay) Peñarol	Guayaquil
	Grijo		Rocha; Spencer

February 6, 1966	Emelec (Ecuador)	0 – 2	(Uruguay) Nacional	Guayaquil
			Pérez; Méndez

February 9, 1966	9 de Octubre (Ecuador)	2 – 3	(Uruguay) Nacional	Guayaquil
	Álvarez (o.g.); Fernández		Morales; Pérez

February 9, 1966	Emelec (Ecuador)	1 – 2	(Uruguay) Peñarol	Guayaquil
	Calonga		Cortés; Joya

February 13, 1966	Deportivo Municipal (Bolivia)	1 – 2	(Uruguay) Peñarol	La Paz
	Caínzo		Abbadie; Spencer

February 13, 1966	Jorge Wilstermann (Bolivia)	0 – 0	(Uruguay) Nacional	Cochabamba

February 19, 1966	Emelec (Ecuador)	3 – 1	(Bolivia) Jorge Wilstermann	Guayaquil
	Lencina; Calonga		Soria

February 19, 1966	9 de Octubre (Ecuador)	3 – 4	(Bolivia) Deportivo Municipal	Guayaquil
	Bono; Fernández; Grijo		Moyano; Castillo

February 24, 1966	9 de Octubre (Ecuador)	3 – 2	(Bolivia) Jorge Wilstermann	Guayaquil
	Fernández; Bono; Grijo		García; López

February 24, 1966	Emelec (Ecuador)	2 – 1	(Bolivia) Deportivo Municipal	Guayaquil
	Lencina; Merizalde		Di Meglio

March 2, 1966	Nacional (Uruguay)	4 – 1	(Bolivia) Deportivo Municipal	Montevideo
	Morales; Virgili		Moyano

March 2, 1966	Peñarol (Uruguay)	2 – 0	(Bolivia) Jorge Wilstermann	Montevideo
	Silva

March 5, 1966	Nacional (Uruguay)	3 – 0	(Bolivia) Jorge Wilstermann	Montevideo
	Morales; Virgili; Ramos

March 5, 1966	Peñarol (Uruguay)	3 – 1	(Bolivia) Deportivo Municipal	Montevideo
	Silva; Spencer; Joya		Moyano

March 8, 1966	Nacional (Uruguay)	1 – 0	(Ecuador) Emelec	Montevideo
	Oyarbide

March 8, 1966	Peñarol (Uruguay)	2 – 0	(Ecuador) 9 de Octubre	Montevideo
	Caetano; Rocha

March 11, 1966	Nacional (Uruguay)	3 – 1	(Ecuador) 9 de Octubre	Montevideo
	Ramos; Morales		Fernández

March 11, 1966	Peñarol (Uruguay)	4 – 1	(Ecuador) Emelec	Montevideo
	Silva; Alfano		Bolaños

March 13, 1966	Jorge Wilstermann (Bolivia)	2 – 1	(Ecuador) Emelec	Cochabamba
	López; Zabalaga		Pineda

March 17, 1966	Jorge Wilstermann (Bolivia)	4 – 1	(Ecuador) 9 de Octubre	Cochabamba
	García; Agreda; López		Fernández

March 17, 1966	Deportivo Municipal (Bolivia)	4 – 1	(Ecuador) Emelec	La Paz
	Torres; Moyano; Aguirre		Bolaños

March 19, 1966	Deportivo Municipal (Bolivia)	5 – 1	(Ecuador) 9 de Octubre	La Paz
	Moyano; Caínzo; Castillo; Espinoza; Aguirre		Fernández

March 19, 1966	Peñarol (Uruguay)	3 – 0	(Uruguay) Nacional	Montevideo
	Rocha; Joya

March 23, 1966	Jorge Wilstermann (Bolivia)	3 – 0	(Bolivia) Deportivo Municipal	Cochabamba
	García; López

March 23, 1966	9 de Octubre (Ecuador)	0 – 4	(Ecuador) Emelec	Guayaquil
			Lencina; Fernández (o.g.)

== Semifinals ==
Seven teams were drawn into two groups, one of four and the other of three. In each group, teams played against each other home-and-away. The top team in each group advanced to the Finals.

=== Group A ===
Pos	Team	Pld	W	D	L	GF	GA	GD	Pts	Qualification or relegation	(Argentina) RIV	(Argentina) IND	(Argentina) BOC	(Paraguay) GUA
1	(Argentina) River Plate	6	3	2	1	13	8	+5	8	Qualified to the Final		4–2	2–2	3–1
2	(Argentina) Independiente	6	3	2	1	9	6	+3	8		1–1		0–0	2–1
3	(Argentina) Boca Juniors	6	2	3	1	7	6	+1	7		1–0	0–2		1–1
4	(Paraguay) Guaraní	6	0	1	5	5	14	−9	1		1–3	0–2	1–3	

Legend: Blue = home team win; Yellow = draw; Red = away team win.

March 30, 1966	Guaraní (Paraguay)	1 – 3	(Argentina) Boca Juniors	Asunción
	González		Menéndez; Rojas

April 6, 1966	Guaraní (Paraguay)	1 – 3	(Argentina) River Plate	Asunción
	González		Solari; Onega; Loayza

April 8, 1966	Boca Juniors (Argentina)	0 – 2	(Argentina) Independiente	Buenos Aires
			Cardoso; Tarabini

April 12, 1966	Independiente (Argentina)	1 – 1	(Argentina) River Plate	Avellaneda
	Tarabini		Solari

April 14, 1966	River Plate (Argentina)	2 – 2	(Argentina) Boca Juniors	Buenos Aires
	Sarnari; Silvero (o.g.)		Madurga; Rojas

April 14, 1966	Guaraní (Paraguay)	0 – 2	(Argentina) Independiente	Asunción
			Cardoso; Pastoriza

April 19, 1966	River Plate (Argentina)	4 – 2	(Argentina) Independiente	Buenos Aires
	Onega; Sarnari		Savoy

April 19, 1966	Boca Juniors (Argentina)	1 – 1	(Paraguay) Guaraní	Buenos Aires
	Rojas		Melgarejo

April 21, 1966	River Plate (Argentina)	3 – 1	(Paraguay) Guaraní	Buenos Aires
	Onega; Loayza		Martínez

April 26, 1966	Independiente (Argentina)	2 – 1	(Paraguay) Guaraní	Avellaneda
	Tarabini; Savoy		Navarro (o.g.)

April 29, 1966	Independiente (Argentina)	0 – 0	(Argentina) Boca Juniors	Avellaneda

May 4, 1966	Boca Juniors (Argentina)	1 – 0	(Argentina) River Plate	Buenos Aires
	Rojas

May 10, 1966 First place playoff	River Plate (Argentina)	2 – 1	(Argentina) Independiente	Buenos Aires
	Onega; Cubilla		Artime

=== Group B ===
Pos	Team	Pld	W	D	L	GF	GA	GD	Pts	Qualification or relegation	(Uruguay) PEÑ	(Chile) CAT	(Uruguay) NAC
1	(Uruguay) Peñarol	4	3	0	1	6	1	+5	6	Qualified to the Final		2–0	3–0
2	(Chile) Universidad Católica	4	2	0	2	4	5	−1	4		1–0		1–0
3	(Uruguay) Nacional	4	1	0	3	3	7	−4	2		0–1	3–2	

Legend: Blue = home team win; Yellow = draw; Red = away team win.

March 30, 1966	Universidad Católica (Chile)	1 – 0	(Uruguay) Peñarol	Santiago
	Ibañez

April 2, 1966	Universidad Católica (Chile)	1 – 0	(Uruguay) Nacional	Santiago
	Inostroza

April 10, 1966	Peñarol (Uruguay)	3 – 0	(Uruguay) Nacional	Montevideo
	Rocha

April 14, 1966	Nacional (Uruguay)	3 – 2	(Chile) Universidad Católica	Montevideo
	Virgili; Oyarbide		Tobar; Inostroza

April 19, 1966	Peñarol (Uruguay)	2 – 0	(Chile) Universidad Católica	Montevideo
	Rocha; Joya

April 23, 1966	Nacional (Uruguay)	0 – 1	(Uruguay) Peñarol	Montevideo
			Cortés

== Finals ==
Pos	Team	Pld	W	D	L	GF	GA	GD	Pts
1	(Uruguay) Peñarol	2	1	0	1	4	3	+1	2
2	(Argentina) River Plate	2	1	0	1	3	4	−1	2

May 12, 1966

Peñarol (Uruguay)	2–0	(Argentina) River Plate
Abbadie 74'; Joya 84'

Estadio Centenario, Montevideo
Attendance: 46,041
Referee: Roberto Goicoechea (Argentina)

May 18, 1966

River Plate (Argentina)	3–2	(Uruguay) Peñarol
D. Onega 37'; Sarnari 56'; E. Onega 69'		Rocha 35'; Spencer 53'

Estadio Antonio V. Liberti, Buenos Aires
Attendance: 60,000
Referee: José María Codesal (Uruguay)

May 20, 1966
Playoff

River Plate (Argentina)	2–4 (a.e.t.)	(Uruguay) Peñarol
D. Onega 27'; Solari 42'		Spencer 65', 102'; Abbadie 71'; Rocha 109'

Estadio Nacional, Santiago
Attendance: 40,240
Referee: Claudio Vicuña (Chile)

== Champion ==
Copa Libertadores de América
1966 Champion

Peñarol
Third Title

== Top goalscorers ==
Pos	Player	Team	Goals
1	(Argentina) Daniel Onega	(Argentina) River Plate	17
2	(Uruguay) Pedro Rocha	(Uruguay) Peñarol	10
3	(Argentina) Alfredo Hugo Rojas	(Argentina) Boca Juniors	7
3	(Uruguay) Julio César Morales	(Uruguay) Nacional	7
3	(Uruguay) Orlando Virgili	(Uruguay) Nacional	7
3	(Venezuela) Agostino Nitti	(Venezuela) Deportivo Italia	7
3	(Argentina) (Bolivia) Salomón Moyano	(Bolivia) Deportivo Municipal	7
3	(Paraguay) Gerardo González	(Paraguay) Olimpia	7
3	(Ecuador) Hugo Lencina	(Ecuador) Emelec	7
3	(Ecuador) Cirilo Fernández	(Ecuador) 9 de Octubre	7
3	(Bolivia) Ausberto García	(Bolivia) Jorge Wilstermann	7

== Footnotes ==
A. The match finished 1-1, but Universitario were declared 0-1 winners as Alianza fielded two ineligible players: Catalá and Cruz.
