= 1966 Intercontinental Cup =

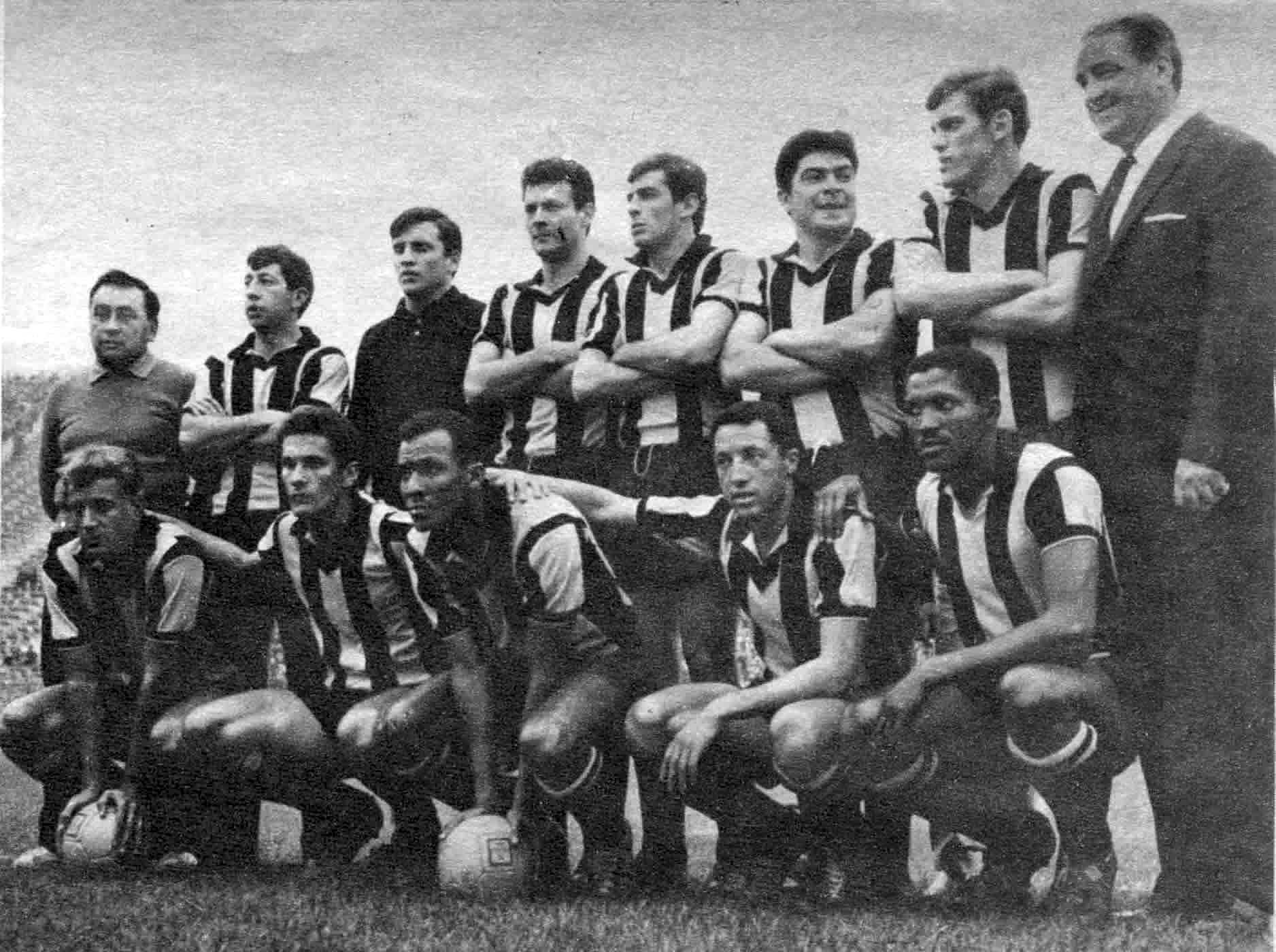
- Peñarol, champions
- Event: Intercontinental Cup
Peñarol	Real Madrid
(Uruguay)	(Spain)
- Peñarol won 4–0 on points

First leg
Peñarol	Real Madrid
2	0
- Date: 12 October 1966
- Venue: Estadio Centenario, Montevideo
- Referee: Claudio Vicuña (Chile)
- Attendance: 71,063

Second leg
Real Madrid	Peñarol
0	2
- Date: 26 October 1966
- Venue: Santiago Bernabéu, Madrid
- Referee: Concetto Lo Bello (Italy)
- Attendance: 58,324

The 1966 Intercontinental Cup was the two-legged tie to define the champion of the Intercontinental Cup. It was contested by Uruguayan club Peñarol and Spanish Real Madrid, which met again after their first encounter in 1960.

In the first match, held in Estadio Centenario, Peñarol beat Real Madrid 2–0. The second leg, held at the Santiago Bernabéu Stadium, saw the Aurinegro team defeat the Spanish side again, by the same scoreline. Therefore, Peñarol won the series 4–0 on points, achieving their second Intercontinental Cup trophy.

== Qualified teams ==
Team	Qualification	Previous finals app.
(Uruguay) Peñarol	1966 Copa Libertadores champion	1960, **1961**
(Spain) Real Madrid	1965–66 European Cup champion	**1960**

Bold indicates winning years

== Venues ==
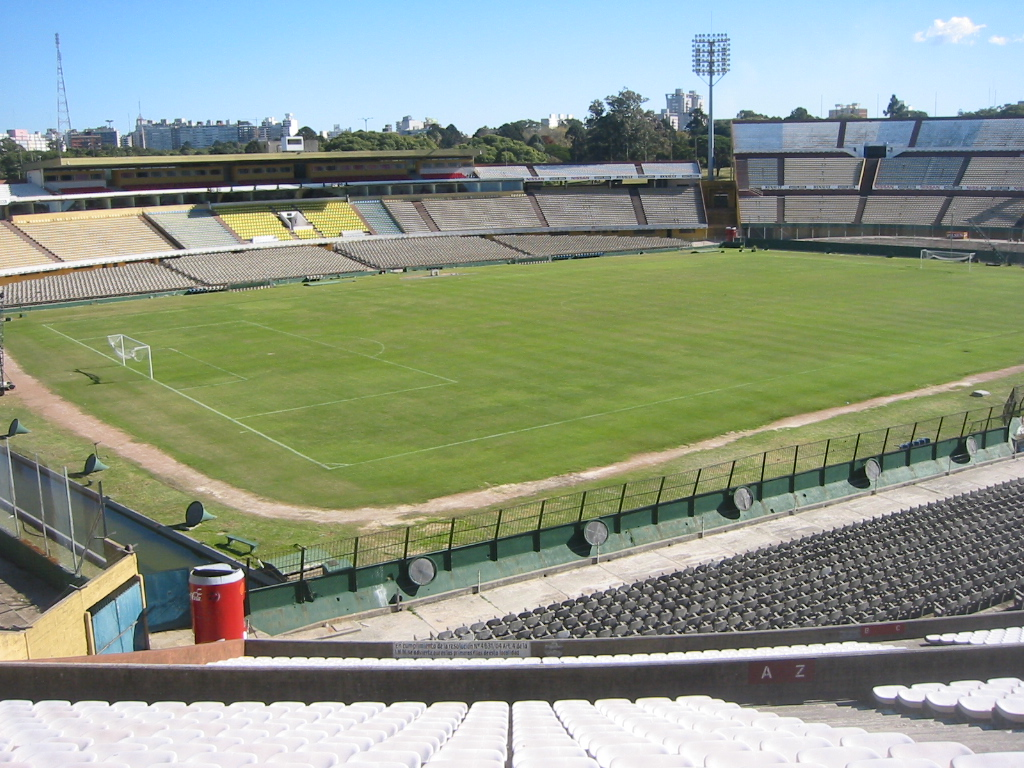
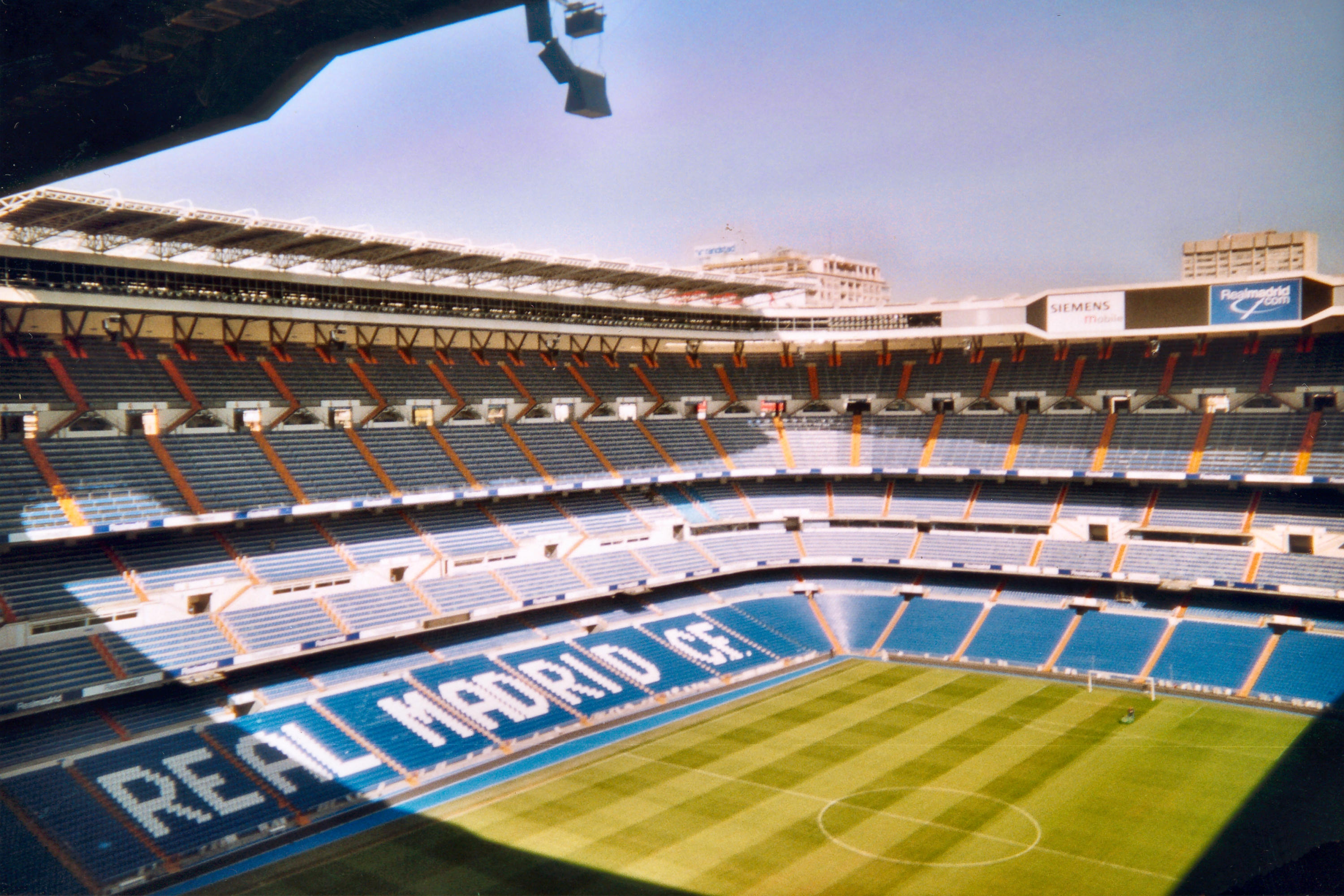
Estadio Centenario (left) and Santiago Bernabéu Stadium, venues for the series

== Match details ==
=== First leg ===
12 October 1966
First leg

Peñarol (Uruguay)	2–0	(Spain) Real Madrid
Spencer 39', 74'	Report

Estadio Centenario, Montevideo
Attendance: 58,324
Referee: Claudio Vicuña (Chile)

**Peñarol**
**Real Madrid**

GK	(Uruguay) Ladislao Mazurkiewicz
DF	(Paraguay) Juan V. Lezcano
DF	(Uruguay) Luis Varela
DF	(Uruguay) Tabaré González
MF	(Uruguay) Néstor Gonçalves (c)
MF	(Uruguay) Omar Caetano
MF	(Uruguay) Julio Abbadie
MF	(Uruguay) Julio César Cortés
FW	(Ecuador) Alberto Spencer
FW	(Uruguay) Pedro Rocha
FW	(Peru) Juan Joya
Manager:
(Uruguay) Roque Máspoli

GK	(Spain) Antonio Betancort
DF	(Spain) Pachín
DF	(Spain) Manuel Sanchís
DF	(Spain) Félix Ruiz (c)
DF	(Spain) Pirri
MF	(Spain) Pedro de Felipe
MF	(Spain) Fernando Serena
MF	(Spain) Ignacio Zoco
MF	(Spain) Manuel Velázquez
FW	(Spain) Amancio Amaro
FW	(Spain) Manuel Bueno
Manager:
(Spain) Miguel Muñoz

=== Second leg ===
26 October 1966
Second leg

Real Madrid (Spain)	0–2	(Uruguay) Peñarol
	Report	Rocha 30' (pen.); Spencer 41'

Santiago Bernabéu, Madrid
Attendance: 71,063
Referee: Concetto Lo Bello (Italy)

**Real Madrid**
**Peñarol**

GK	1	(Spain) Antonio Betancort
RB	2	(Spain) Antonio Calpe
CB	5	(Spain) Pedro de Felipe
LB	3	(Spain) Manuel Sanchís
RH	4	(Spain) Pirri
LH	6	(Spain) Ignacio Zoco
CM	10	(Spain) Manuel Velázquez
RW	7	(Spain) Fernando Serena
CF	8	(Spain) Amancio Amaro
CF	9	(Spain) Ramón Grosso
LW	11	(Spain) Francisco Gento (c)
Manager:
(Spain) Miguel Muñoz

GK	1	(Uruguay) Ladislao Mazurkiewicz
RB	4	(Uruguay) Tabaré González
CB	2	(Paraguay) Juan V. Lezcano
CB	3	(Uruguay) Luis Varela
LB	6	(Uruguay) Omar Caetano
DM	5	(Uruguay) Néstor Gonçalves (c)
MF	7	(Uruguay) Julio Abbadie
MF	8	(Uruguay) Pedro Rocha
MF	10	(Uruguay) Julio César Cortés
CF	9	(Ecuador) Alberto Spencer
FW	11	(Peru) Juan Joya
Manager:
(Uruguay) Roque Máspoli

== See also ==
- 1960 Intercontinental Cup – contested between same teams
- 1965–66 European Cup
- 1966 Copa Libertadores
- Real Madrid CF in international football competitions
