= Néstor Gonçalves =

Uruguayan footballer (1936-2016)

Néstor Goncálvez
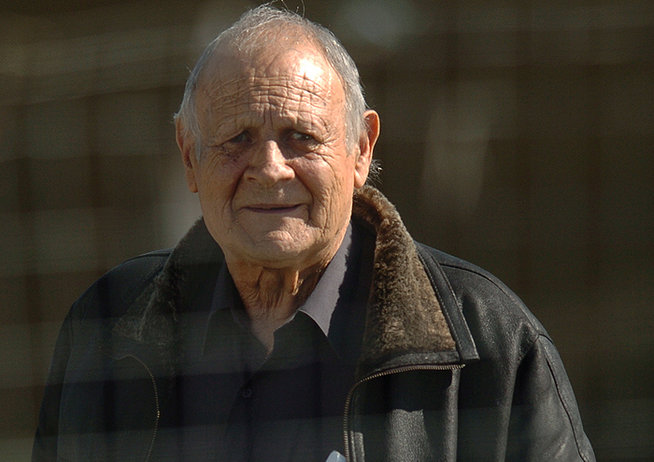

Personal information
- Full name: Néstor Goncálvez Martinicorena
- Date of birth: 27 April 1936
- Place of birth: Cabellos, Artigas, Uruguay
- Date of death: 29 December 2016 (aged 80)
- Height: 1.78 m (5 ft 10 in)
- Position: Defensive midfielder

Senior career*
Years	Team	Apps	(Gls)
1956–1970	Peñarol	574	(30)

International career
1957–1968	Uruguay	50	(1)
- * Club domestic league appearances and goals

Néstor Goncálvez Martinicorena (27 April 1936 – 29 December 2016) was a Uruguayan footballer who played as a midfielder for Uruguay in the 1962 and 1966 FIFA World Cups. He mainly played for C.A. Peñarol and is considered to have been one of the best South American midfielders of the 1960s.

Born in Cabellos, Artigas, Gonçalvez began his career playing football for Salto from 1953 to 1956. In 1957, he joined Peñarol, where he played until 1970.

== Personal life ==
Gonçalves' son, Jorge Gonçalves, was also a professional footballer. Nestor died on 29 December 2016 at the age of 80 after being hospitalized for kidney problems.

== Honours ==
Peñarol

- Primera División (9): 1958, 1959, 1960, 1961, 1962, 1964, 1965, 1967, 1968
- Copa Libertadores: 1960, 1961, 1966
- Intercontinental Cup: 1961, 1966
- Intercontinental Champions' Supercup: 1969

Individual

- World XI: 1966
