= Roque Máspoli =

Uruguayan footballer and coach (1917-2004)

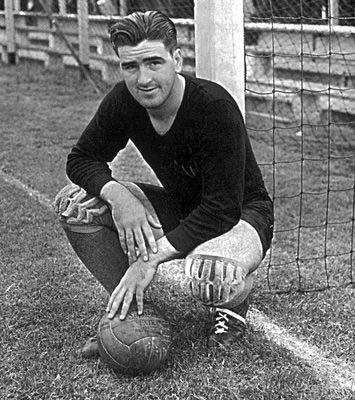
- Máspoli as Peñarol goalkeeper

Personal information
- Full name: Roque Gastón Máspoli Arbelvide
- Date of birth: 12 October 1917
- Place of birth: Montevideo, Uruguay
- Date of death: 22 February 2004 (aged 86)
- Place of death: Montevideo, Uruguay
- Height: 1.89 m (6 ft 2 in)
- Position: Goalkeeper

Youth career
- –1933: Nacional

Senior career*
Years	Team	Apps	(Gls)
1933–1939	Nacional	49	(2)
1939–1940	Liverpool Montevideo	46	(1)
1940–1955	Peñarol	253	(20)
Total		348	(23)

International career
1945–1955	Uruguay	40	(1)

Managerial career
- 1955: Peñarol
- 1956: Danubio
- 1963–1967: Peñarol
- 1968–1970: Elche
- 1970–1971: Peñarol
- 1972–1973: Defensor Lima
- 1975: El Nacional
- 1975–1977: Ecuador
- 1976: Peñarol
- 1977–1978: Sporting Cristal
- 1979–1982: Uruguay
- 1985–1986: Peñarol
- 1987: Barcelona SC
- 1988: Peñarol
- 1992: Peñarol
- 1997: Uruguay
Medal record
Representing Uruguay
FIFA World Cup
Winner	1950 Brazil
- * Club domestic league appearances and goals

Roque Gastón Máspoli Arbelvide (12 October 1917 in Montevideo – 22 February 2004 in Montevideo) was a Uruguayan football player and coach. He was the goalkeeper for the Uruguay national team that won the 1950 World Cup. He was also the head coach for the Uruguayan team that won the 1980 Mundialito.

== Career ==
Born in Montevideo, into a Ticinese family originally from Caslano, Maspoli began playing in the youth ranks of Club Nacional de Football. He would make his Uruguayan Primera División debut with Liverpool de Montevideo in 1939.

After one season with Liverpool, he joined C.A. Peñarol. He would spend the rest of his playing career with Peñarol, winning six Primera titles with the club.

In the final match of the 1950 World Cup, known as the "Maracanazo" due to Uruguay's surprising win at the Maracanã stadium in Rio de Janeiro, in front of near 200,000 Brazilian fans, Máspoli allowed one goal as the visitors beat favorites Brazil 2–1.

Máspoli also coached Uruguayan club Peñarol, with which he won five national championships, the Copa Libertadores and the 1966 Intercontinental Cup, when the team beat Real Madrid 4–0 on aggregate. Later, he managed teams in Spain, Peru and Ecuador.

In the 1980s, Máspoli spent several years coaching the Uruguay national team. He took charge again in 1997, becoming the oldest ever manager of any national football team at the age of 80.

Roque Máspoli was hospitalized on 10 February 2004 with heart trouble. He died twelve days later at the age of 86. His remains are buried at Cementerio del Buceo, Montevideo.

== Honours ==
=== As a player ===
==== Club ====
Nacional

- Primera División: 1933, 1934, 1939
- Torneo de Honor: 1935, 1938, 1939
- Torneo Competencia: 1934

Peñarol

- Primera División: 1944, 1945, 1949, 1951, 1953, 1954

==== International ====
Uruguay

- FIFA World Cup: 1950

=== Individual ===
- FIFA World Cup All-Star Team: 1950
- IFFHS Uruguayan Men's Dream Team (Team B)

=== As a manager ===
==== Club ====
Peñarol

- Primera División: 1964, 1965, 1967, 1985, 1986
- Intercontinental Cup: 1966
- Copa Libertadores: 1966

Defensor Lima

- Peruvian Primera División: 1973

Barcelona SC

- Serie A: 1987

==== International ====
Uruguay

- 1980 Mundialito Gold medal: 1981
