= Julio César Cortés =

Uruguayan footballer and coach (1941–2025)

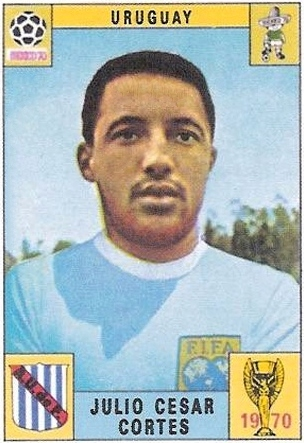
- Cortés on a 1970 sports card

Personal information
- Full name: Julio César Cortés Lagos
- Date of birth: 29 March 1941
- Place of birth: Montevideo, Uruguay
- Date of death: 24 July 2025 (aged 84)
- Height: 1.76 m (5 ft 9 in)
- Position: Midfielder

Youth career
- –1962: Sud América

Senior career*
Years	Team	Apps	(Gls)
1956–1957	Fénix		
1958–1959	Peñarol		
1960–1961	Sud América		
1962–1964	Cerro		
1965	Rosario Central	21	(2)
1966–1971	Peñarol		
1972	Atlante		
1973–1974	UNAM Pumas		
1974	Municipal		
1974	Los Angeles Aztecs	19	(1)
1974–1975	Alianza		
1976–1978	Guanacasteca	80	(4)

International career
1962–1970	Uruguay	30	(3)

Managerial career
- 1983: Suchitepéquez
- 1984–1985: Juventud Retalteca
- 1987: Guatemala
- Comunicaciones
- Saprissa
- 1997–1998: Cobán Imperial
- Xelajú
- Turrialba
- 2000–2003: Aurora
- 2004: Guatemala
- 2005: Águila
- 2007: Jalapa
- 2007: San Carlos
- * Club domestic league appearances and goals

Julio César "El Pocho" Cortés Lagos (Spanish: [ˈxuljo ˈsesaɾ el ˈpotʃo koɾˈtez ˈlaɣos]; 29 March 1941 – 24 July 2025) was a Uruguayan football coach and midfielder who participated in three World Cups with the Uruguay national team.

At the club level, Cortés was most successful during the time he played for Uruguayan club Peñarol, winning two league titles and the Copa Libertadores and the Intercontinental Cup in 1966.

Cortés spent the majority of his coaching career in Central America, managing several clubs and having two tenures as coach of the Guatemala national team, which he led to win the 2001 UNCAF Nations Cup tournament.

== Playing career ==
Cortés began his career with Sud América, and in 1962, he joined C.A. Cerro. He left the club in 1965 to play in Argentina for Rosario Central.

=== Peñarol and international success ===
After one season with Rosario, Cortés returned to Uruguay to join Peñarol in 1966, and became part of a first team that included players like Pedro Rocha, Alberto Spencer, Julio César Abbadie, and Omar Caetano. The team went on to win the Copa Libertadores in 1966, with Cortés scoring a decisive goal against arch-rivals Nacional in the semifinal playoff on 23 April 1966, which allowed the team to reach the final where they defeated Argentine's River Plate after three matches, obtaining their third Copa Libertadores. Later that year, Cortés helped Peñarol to defeat Spanish champions Real Madrid to win the Intercontinental Cup title. While Cortés was playing for the club, Peñarol also won the domestic league championship in 1967 and 1968.

Cortés joined Mexican Primera División side Atlante F.C. in 1973.

=== Uruguay national team (1962–1970) ===
From 1962 to 1970, Cortés appeared in 30 international matches for Uruguay, scoring 3 goals. He made his international debut on 2 May 1962 in a 3–2 victory against Scotland in Glasgow shortly before the 1962 World Cup, at which he played in one match. He also appeared at the 1966 and 1970 finals, being one of six Uruguayan players to be part of three World Cup squads.

At the 1966 World Cup, Cortés scored the eventual match-winning goal against France, one of the two goals Uruguay scored in that match and in the entire tournament. Uruguay were eliminated in the quarter finals by West Germany in a 4–0 defeat, with Cortes later suspended for a year from international football after he kicked the referee, Jim Finney, at the end of the match.

Four years later in Mexico, he played all of Uruguay's six matches, as the team reached the semifinals, where they lost to Brazil. With the consolation match against West Germany, Cortés reached an overall total of 11 World Cup matches played, Uruguay's second-highest mark behind goalkeeper and Peñarol teammate Ladislao Mazurkiewicz's 13. The match against the Germans was also his last international match.

== Coaching career ==
After having played in Costa Rica in the late 1970s, Cortés became a coach and thereafter spent almost three decades managing several clubs in Costa Rica, Guatemala, and El Salvador.

In 1983, Cortés led Deportivo Suchitepéquez to their only national title to date. Other Guatemalan clubs he coached in the 1980s and 1990s are Juventud Retalteca, CSD Comunicaciones, Xelajú MC, and Aurora F.C. In Costa Rica, he coached Turrialba F.C and Deportivo Saprissa in the 1990s, and in the 2000s, he coached C.D. Águila of El Salvador, Deportivo Jalapa of Guatemala, and A.D. San Carlos of Costa Rica (2007). He had been coaching football classes at the "San José Indoor Club" in Costa Rica at the time of his death.

=== Guatemala national team (1987–88 and 2000–03) ===
In 1987, Cortés was named head coach of the Guatemala national team, managing it at that year's Pan American Games. This tenure lasted just over one year until he was replaced by Jorge Roldán in April 1988. Cortés' second period as Guatemala's manager began in June 2000 and ended three years later, in what is one of the longest uninterrupted tenures for a coach of the Guatemalan team. During that time, Guatemala failed to qualify for the 2002 World Cup, but won the 2001 UNCAF Nations Cup – its first international title in 34 years – and finished runner-up of that tournament two years later.

==== Dispute with the Guatemalan Federation ====
After being removed from the charge of national coach in April 2003, Cortés sued the Guatemalan football federation (FEDEFUT) for breach of contract, demanding payment of part of his remuneration as national team coach. The coach took the case before FIFA, who in 2006 ruled that the FEDEFUT pay him part of what he demanded. In September 2006, the FEDEFUT reacted against the coach, accusing him of fraud before a local court, which dictated that Cortés – who was at the time living in Costa Rica and was at the moment in Guatemala – remain in the country.

== Death ==
Cortés died on 24 July 2025, at the age of 84.

== Honours ==
=== Player ===
Peñarol

- Copa Libertadores: 1966
- Uruguayan Primera División: 1967, 1968

Uruguay

- FIFA World Cup fourth place: 1970

=== Manager ===
Suchitepéquez

- Liga Mayor A: 1983

Juventud Retalteca

- Guatemalan domestic cup: 1984–85

Jalapa

- Guatemalan domestic cup: 2005

Guatemala

- UNCAF Nations Cup: 2001
