= Héctor Silva (Uruguayan footballer) =

Uruguayan footballer (1940-2015)

Personal information
- Date of birth: 1 February 1940
- Place of birth: Montevideo, Uruguay
- Date of death: 30 August 2015 (aged 75)
- Place of death: Montevideo, Uruguay
- Position: Attacking midfielder

Senior career*
Years	Team	Apps	(Gls)
1958–1963	Danubio	115	(37)
1964–1970	Peñarol	184	(91)
1970–1971	Palmeiras	80	(16)
1972	L.D.U. Quito		
1972–1973	Portuguesa		
1974–1975	Danubio	27	(11)

International career
1961–1969	Uruguay	29	(7)
- * Club domestic league appearances and goals

Héctor Jesús "Lito" Silva (1 February 1940 – 30 August 2015) was a Uruguayan football forward who played for Uruguay in the 1962 and 1966 FIFA World Cups. He also played for Danubio and C.A. Peñarol.

Hector died on 30 August 2015.

== Honours ==
Peñarol

- Uruguayan Primera División (3): 1964, 1965, 1967
- Copa Libertadores (1): 1966
- Intercontinental Cup (1): 1966
