= Juan Joya =

Peruvian footballer (1934-2007)

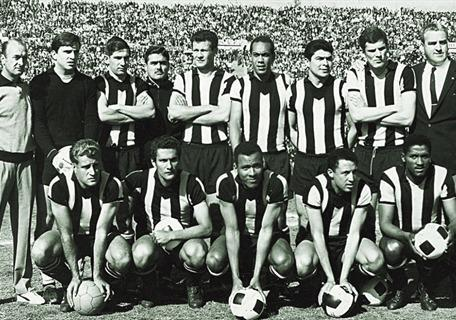

Personal information
- Full name: Juan Joya Cordero
- Date of birth: 25 February 1934
- Place of birth: Lima, Peru
- Date of death: March 29, 2007 (aged 73)
- Place of death: Lima, Peru
- Positions: Striker; left winger

Senior career*
Years	Team	Apps	(Gls)
1954–1959	Alianza Lima	70	(37)
1960	River Plate	21	(6)
1961–1969	Peñarol	471	(70)
1970	Juan Aurich	20	(8)
Total		582	(121)

International career
1956–1959	Peru	9	(3)
1965	Uruguay	1	(0)
- * Club domestic league appearances and goals

Juan Joya Cordero (February 25, 1934 – March 29, 2007) was a Peruvian association football player, recognized as one of Peru's most important strikers. He was a historic forward of the Club Atlético Peñarol of Uruguay in the 1960s, one of the best South American teams of the twentieth century. During his time with Club Atlético Peñarol, he won 6 Uruguayan league championships, two Copa Libertadores, two Intercontinental Cups, and one Intercontinental Champions' Supercup. He was considered one of the best wingers in the world in the 1960s, and remains one of the most famous Peruvian footballers of all time.

Joya also played for Alianza Lima, Juan Aurich and River Plate.

== Early life ==
Joya was born in Lima, where he started his playing career in the youth team of Alianza Lima. Joya helped the team to win back-to-back titles in 1954 and 1955. In 1958, he scored 17 goals in 18 matches of the Peruvian league, making him the league's top goalscorer.

== Playing career ==
Joya achieved two Peruvian championships with Alianza Lima in 1954 and 1955 and was the top scorer in the Peruvian League in 1957, scoring 17 goals in 18 games.

In 1960, he joined Club Atlético River Plate. He helped the team reach second place at the Argentina championship.

In 1961, he joined Peñarol, He played 9 seasons as a forward for Club Atlético Peñarol, from 1961 to 1969. With the aurinegro (gold and black) jersey he played 132 games, scoring 80 goals. At Alianza Lima, he had always served as a forward striker, but when he reached Peñarol, coach Roberto Scarone positioned him as a midfielder for the left wing.

Joya scored two of the five goals that Peñarol scored against Benfica in 1961, winning Peñatol's first Intercontinental Cup. He played four finals of the Copa Libertadores, winning twice, and was the undisputed starter in all of them. While Joya was at Peñarol, the team won 6 Uruguayan league championships (1961, 1962, 1964, 1965, 1967, and 1968), two Copa Libertadores (1961 and 1966), two Intercontinental Cups (1961 and 1966), and one Intercontinental Champions' Supercup (1969). In these tournaments, Joya was a key player, accompanied by Alberto Spencer, Pedro Virgilio Rocha, Julio César Abbadie, and Ermindo Onega.

While playing for Peñarol, he was nicknamed "Dueño de la Olímpica” (Owner of the Olympic) due to the Tribuna Olímpica (Olympic Grandstand) being the section where he best demonstrated his abilities. He was also given the nickname "negro el once" (Black, #11) by radio commentator Heber Pinto.

In 1970, Joya played for Juan Aurich in Peru.

Joya played 9 games for the Peru national team in which he scored 3 points. He played in two Copa América tournaments in 1957 and 1959. Joya was part of the Peru national team that beat England 4–1 in Lima, a game in which he scored the fourth goal.

== Honours ==
=== Team ===
Season	Team	Title
1954	Alianza Lima	Peruvian League
1955	Alianza Lima	Peruvian League
1961	Peñarol	Primera División Uruguaya
1961	Peñarol	Copa Libertadores
1961	Peñarol	Copa Intercontinental
1962	Peñarol	Primera División Uruguaya
1964	Peñarol	Primera División Uruguaya
1965	Peñarol	Primera División Uruguaya
1966	Peñarol	Copa Libertadores
1966	Peñarol	Copa Intercontinental
1967	Peñarol	Primera División Uruguaya
1968	Peñarol	Primera División Uruguaya
1969	Peñarol	Supercopa Sudamericana

=== Individual awards ===
- Peruvian League: Top Scorer 1958
