= Guery =

Guery may refer to:

== Places ==
- Bézu-le-Guéry, a commune in the department of Aisne in Hauts-de-France in northern France
- Lac de Guéry, a lake in Puy-de-Dôme, France

== People ==
=== Surname ===
- Béatrice Guéry (born 1966), French former professional tennis player
- Jérôme Guery (born 1980), Belgian Olympic show jumping rider

=== Given name ===
- Guery Agreda (born 1942), Bolivian footballer
