= Alberto Spencer =

Ecuadorian and Uruguayan footballer (1937–2006)

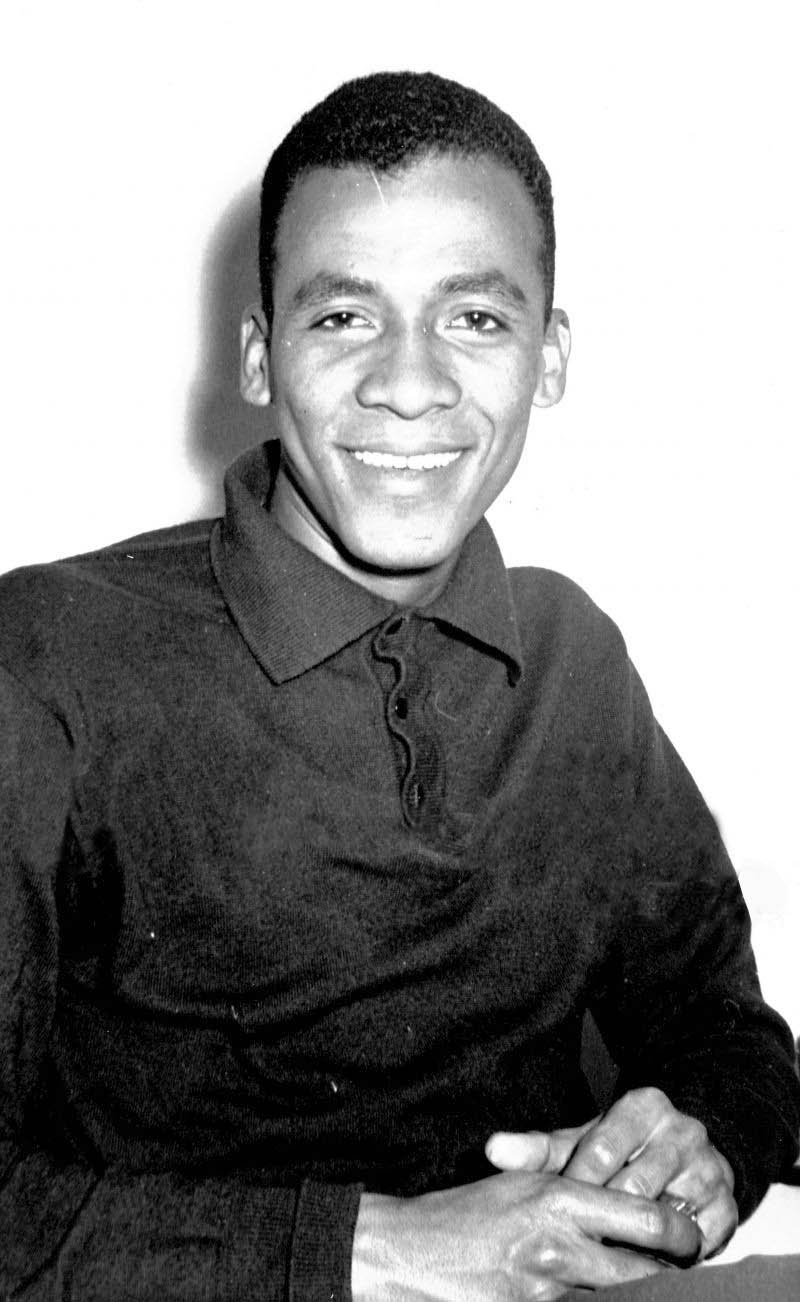
- Alberto Spencer photographed for El Gráfico

Personal information
- Full name: Alberto Pedro Spencer Herrera
- Date of birth: 6 December 1937
- Place of birth: Ancón, Santa Elena, Ecuador
- Date of death: 3 November 2006 (aged 68)
- Place of death: Cleveland, Ohio, United States
- Position: Forward

Youth career
- Los Andes
- 1953–1955: Everest

Senior career*
Years	Team	Apps	(Gls)
1955–1959	Everest	90	(101)
1959–1970	Peñarol	519	(326)
1971–1972	Barcelona SC	37	(19)
Total		662	(446)

International career
1959–1972	Ecuador	11	(4)
1964–1967	Uruguay	5	(1)
- * Club domestic league appearances and goals

Alberto Pedro Spencer Herrera (6 December 1937 – 3 November 2006) was an Ecuadorian and Uruguayan footballer who played as a forward, and is widely regarded as one of the best Ecuadorian men's footballers of all time. He is probably best known for his still-standing record for scoring the most goals in the Copa Libertadores, the premier club tournament in South America. He was elected the 20th best South American footballer of the 20th century in a poll by the IFFHS in 2004. He was known as "Cabeza Mágica" (Spanish for magic head).

== Biography ==
Born in Ancón, Santa Elena, Ecuador, Spencer was the son of a Jamaican of British origin.

He was an ambidextrous striker with lethal pace, off-the-ball movement, heading and balance skills, and excellent finishing that tore defences to shreds for over a decade. After his retirement in 1973, he lived in Montevideo, Uruguay. In 1982, he was appointed consul of Ecuador in Uruguay.

Spencer suffered a heart attack on 13 September 2006 during a routine checkup with his cardiologist. He died on 3 November 2006 in the Cleveland Clinic in Cleveland, Ohio, United States. His lineage survives through his Chilean wife María Teresa, his children Alberto, Walter, Jacqueline, and his grandchildren.

== Career ==
Alberto Spencer began his career at age 15 playing for Everest. He jumped to fame when he was scouted while playing on loan for Barcelona SC against Peñarol in July 1959. Peñarol's manager, Hugo Bagnulo, asked his scout 'Pibe' Ortega to attempt to sign him after the game was over. He was soon transferred to Peñarol where he amassed three Libertadores Cups and two Intercontinental Cups, as well as several Uruguayan league titles. After his second Intercontinental Cup, he was twice sought by Inter, but ultimately Peñarol's board would not sell him.

On the international front, Spencer holds the unique distinction of being the only goalscorer, capped by two different countries simultaneously: Ecuador, and Uruguay. He 'switched' shirts no less than four times. He played for Uruguay against England (2-1) in a friendly match at the legendary Wembley Stadium and scored, making him the first Ecuadorian-born player to score in that stadium.

His name was omitted from FIFA's, and Pelé's list of 100 greatest living players. This caused outrage among many South American journalists who believed greats like Spencer, were being ignored in favour of commercialism. David Mellor of the Evening Standard notably blasted FIFA in his reporting of the incident.

Although widely considered one of the best South American players of all time, he still remains largely an unknown figure in Europe. This is presumably because he never participated in a World Cup or played in Europe. Similar fates awaited other greats such as Alfredo Di Stéfano (who, while called up for the 1962 tournament, did not play due to injury) and George Best, though both are far more known due to their domestic careers with Real Madrid and Manchester United respectively.

He was elected the 20th South American Player of the Century in a poll by the IFFHS in 2004.

== Achievements ==
Spencer still maintains the South American club record in Copa Libertadores, with his tally of 54 goals between 1960 and 1972, playing for Everest of Guayaquil, Barcelona of Guayaquil, and Peñarol (Uruguay). During that period, he walked away as winner of the competition three times (1960, 1961, and 1966, all of them playing for Peñarol) and was winner of the Intercontinental Cup twice, beating Eusebio's Benfica and Real Madrid, and was runner-up once. In fact, his Intercontinental goal tally is only one goal behind the all-time record of his more famous contemporary, Pelé.

Spencer was also four times the leading scorer of Uruguay's League with Peñarol, helping them to win the Uruguayan championship eight times during his 12-year stay. Throughout his professional career, he scored a grand total of 450 goals, surpassing 500 if friendlies were taken into account.

== Honours ==
Peñarol

- Primera División (8): 1959, 1960, 1961, 1962, 1964, 1965, 1967, 1968
- Copa Libertadores: 1960, 1961, 1966
- Intercontinental Cup: 1961, 1966
- Supercopa de Campeones Intercontinentales: 1969

Barcelona SC

- Serie A: 1971

Individual

- Copa Libertadores top scorer: 1960, 1962
- Primera División top scorer: 1961, 1962, 1967, 1968
- RSSSF - Ecuador: Player of the century
- IFFHS: 20th best South American player in the century
- Copa América Historical Dream Team: 2011
