= 1965 Campeonato Ecuatoriano de Fútbol =

Campeonato Ecuatoriano de Fútbol
- Season: 1965
- Champions: Emelec (3rd title)
- Copa Libertadores: Emelec; 9 de Octubre
- Matches played: 33
- Goals scored: 77 (2.33 per match)
- Top goalscorer: Helio Cruz (8 goals)
- Biggest home win: Barcelona 5–2 El Nacional; Emelec 3–0 Universidad Católica; Emelec 3–0 Aucas; Patria 3–0 El Nacional
- Biggest away win: El Nacional 0–2 9 de Octubre; Aucas 1–3 9 de Octubre; Universidad Católica 0–2 Patria
- Highest scoring: Barcelona 5–2 El Nacional

The 1965 Campeonato Ecuatoriano de Fútbol (English: Ecuadorian Football Championship) was the 7th national championship for football teams in Ecuador. Emelec won their third national title. They qualified to the 1966 Copa Libertadores along with 9 de Octubre.

== Qualified teams ==
The number of teams remained the same at eight. The qualified teams included the top-four finishers from the Campeonato Interandino and the Campeonato de Guayaquil. Universidad Católica made their first appearance in the tournament.

Competition	Team	Qualification method
Guayaquil; 4 berths	Barcelona	1965 Guayaquil champion
Guayaquil; 4 berths	Emelec	1965 Guayaquil runner-up
Guayaquil; 4 berths	9 de Octubre	1965 Guayaquil top-four finishers
Guayaquil; 4 berths	Patria	1965 Guayaquil top-four finishers
Interandino; 4 berths	Universidad Católica	1965 Interandino champion
Interandino; 4 berths	LDU Quito	1965 Interandino runner-up
Interandino; 4 berths	Aucas	1965 Interandino top-four finishers
Interandino; 4 berths	El Nacional	1965 Interandino top-four finishers

== Standings ==
Pos	Team	Pld	W	D	L	GF	GA	GD	Pts	Qualification or relegation
1	Emelec	8	6	2	0	17	6	+11	14	1966 Copa Libertadores
2	Barcelona	8	4	3	1	14	10	+4	11	Playoff
3	9 de Octubre	8	5	1	2	10	7	+3	11	Playoff
4	Patria	8	5	1	2	9	5	+4	11	Playoff
5	LDU Quito	8	2	4	2	8	9	−1	8	
6	El Nacional	8	3	0	5	12	18	−6	6	
7	Universidad Católica	8	0	2	6	4	14	−10	2	
8	Aucas	8	0	1	7	1	15	−14	1	

Rules for classification: 1st points.

Campeonato Ecuatoriano de Fútbol
1965 champion
Emelec
3rd title

== Results ==
Home \ Away (Note: Teams from the same association did not play each other.)	9OC	BAR	EME	PAT	AUC	NAC	LDQ	CAT
9 de Octubre					0–1 (Note: Aucas lost the matches by fielding an ineligible player.)	1–2	0–0	1–0
Barcelona					0–0	5–2	1–1	2–0
Emelec					3–0	3–2	2–0	3–0
Patria					0–0	3–0	1–0	1–0
Aucas	1–3	2–2	0–1	0–0				
El Nacional	0–2	2–1	2–3	2–0				
LDU Quito	2–1	1–1	1–1	3–2				
Universidad Católica	1–2	2–2	1–1	0–2				

Legend: Blue = home team win; Yellow = draw; Red = away team win.

=== Runner-up playoff ===
Since 9 de Octubre, Barcelona, and Patria finished the tournament equal on points, a playoff was needed to determine who finished as the runner-up and qualified to the 1966 Copa Libertadores. Patria declined to participate. After tying at a goal apiece, 9 de Octubre was declared the runner-up since they had a better goal average throughout the season (1.37 v. 1.36).

Team 1	Score	Team 2
9 de Octubre	1–1	Barcelona
