= Pedro Rocha (Uruguayan footballer) =

Uruguayan footballer (1942–2013)

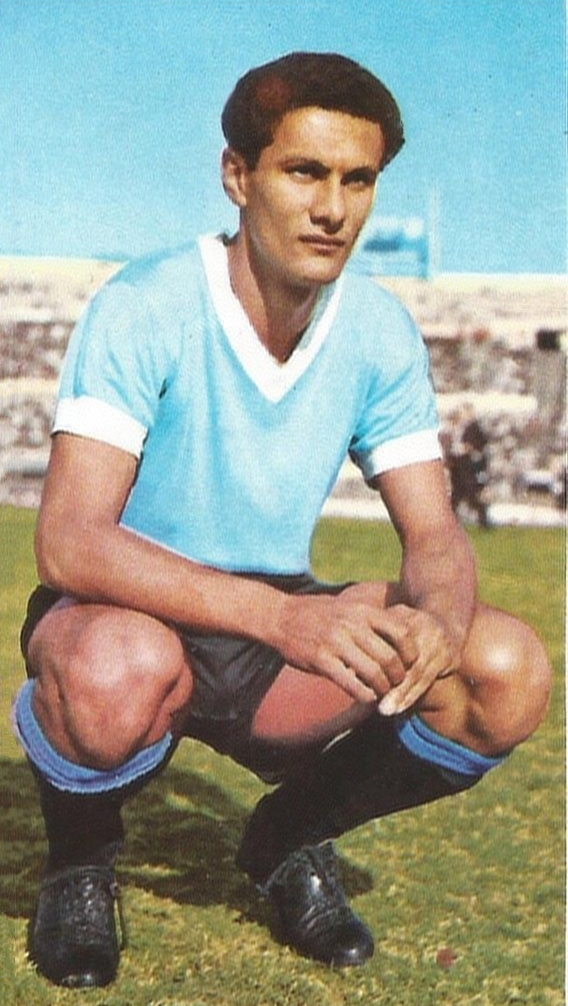
- Rocha c. 1966

Personal information
- Full name: Pedro Virgilio Rocha Franchetti
- Date of birth: 3 December 1942
- Place of birth: Salto, Uruguay
- Date of death: 2 December 2013 (aged 70)
- Place of death: São Paulo, Brazil
- Height: 1.83 m (6 ft 0 in)
- Positions: Attacking midfielder; forward

Senior career*
Years	Team	Apps	(Gls)
1960–1970	Peñarol	159	(81)
1970–1977	São Paulo	393	(119)
1978	Coritiba	20	(1)
1979	Palmeiras		
1980	Bangu		
1979–1980	Neza		
1980	Monterrey	3	(0)

International career
1961–1974	Uruguay	52	(17)

Managerial career
- 1981: Inter de Limeira
- 1981: Taubaté
- 1983: Inter de Limeira
- 1987: Botafogo-SP
- 1987: Coritiba
- 1987: Guarani
- 1988: Mogi Mirim
- 1988: Portuguesa
- 1988–1989: Sporting CP
- 1990: Mogi Mirim
- 1990–1991: Vitória de Guimarães
- 1991: Mogi Mirim
- 1991–1992: Noroeste
- 1992: Novorizontino
- 1995: Mogi Mirim
- 1996: Internacional
- 1997: Kyoto Purple Sanga
- 1998: Ponte Preta
- 1999: Ituano
- 2000: Caldense
- 2000: XV de Piracicaba
- 2000: Ipatinga
- 2001: Mogi Mirim
Medal record
Men's football
Representing Uruguay
South American Championship
Winner	1967 Uruguay
- * Club domestic league appearances and goals

Pedro Virgilio Rocha Franchetti (Spanish pronunciation: [ˈpeðɾo ˈrotʃa]; 3 December 1942 – 2 December 2013) was a Uruguayan footballer who played 52 games for the Uruguay national team between 1961 and 1974. Nicknamed "el Verdugo" ("the Executioner"), he was a highly skillful midfielder and a prolific goalscorer, regarded by Pelé as "one of the 5 best players in the world". He was listed by the IFFHS as the 37th greatest South American player of the XXth century.

== Biography ==
Rocha is the first player to appear in four consecutive World Cups for the Uruguay national team: 1962, 1966, 1970 and 1974, and remained the only one until 2022. He also played in the Copa América in 1967.

At club level he played most of his career for Peñarol and São Paulo in Brazil.

During his time with Peñarol, the club won eight Uruguayan league titles (1959–1962, 1964, 1965, 1967, 1968), three Copa Libertadores (1960, 1961, 1966) the Copa Intercontinental in 1961 and 1966 and two editions of the Uruguayan Copa Competencia in 1964 and 1967.

In 1970 Rocha joined São Paulo F.C. where he helped the team obtain the Campeonato Paulista in 1971 and 1975. He was the championship top scorer in 1972. In 1977, his final year with the club they became national champions for the first time in their history.

Later in his career he played for Coritiba where he won Campeonato Paranaense championship, Palmeiras and Bangu in Brazil. His last clubs were Deportivo Neza and Monterrey in Mexico in 1979 and 1980.

He coached Japan's J.League club Kyoto Purple Sanga in 1997.

He suffered from mesencephalic atrophy, a serious degenerative illness that affected his speech and his movements, paralyzing part of his body and confining him to a wheelchair. He died on 2 December 2013 in São Paulo, one day before completing 71 years.

== Career statistics ==
=== Club ===
Appearances and goals by club, season and competition
Club	Season	League			State league		Friendly		Other		Total	
Club	Season	Division	Apps	Goals	Apps	Goals	Apps	Goals	Apps	Goals	Apps	Goals
Peñarol	1960	Uruguayan Primera División		0	—		—		—			5
Peñarol	1961	Uruguayan Primera División		1	—		—		—			1
Peñarol	1962	Uruguayan Primera División		8	—		—		6 (Note: Appearances in Copa Libertadores)	0		14
Peñarol	1963	Uruguayan Primera División		18	—		—		4	3		36
Peñarol	1964	Uruguayan Primera División		10	—		—		—			29
Peñarol	1965	Uruguayan Primera División		15	—		—		9	4		26
Peñarol	1966	Uruguayan Primera División		3	—		—		16 (Note: Fourteen appearances and ten goals in Copa Libertadores, two appearances and one goal in Intercontinental Cup)	11		7
Peñarol	1967	Uruguayan Primera División		6	—		—		4	1		22
Peñarol	1968	Uruguayan Primera División		8	—		—		14 (Note: Ten appearances and one goal in Copa Libertadores, four appearances and three goals in Intercontinental Champions' Supercup)	4		
Peñarol	1969	Uruguayan Primera División		12	—		—		13 (Note: Seven appearances and two goals in Copa Libertadores, six appearances and six goals in Intercontinental Champions' Supercup)	8		
Peñarol	1970	Uruguayan Primera División		1	—		—		6	4		4
Peñarol	Total		157	82	0	0	0	0	72	35	287	234
São Paulo	1970	Série A	15	4	0	0		0	—			4
São Paulo	1971	Série A	15	0	19	5		4	—			9
São Paulo	1972	Série A	18	18	21	4		0	10	3		25
São Paulo	1973	Série A	34	8	20	6		7				21
São Paulo	1974	Série A	11	1	22	6		1	13	7		15
São Paulo	1975	Série A	22	3	32	11		3	—			17
São Paulo	1976	Série A	11	0	22	9		6	—			15
São Paulo	1977	Série A	0	0	39	13		0	—			13
São Paulo	Total		136	34	175	54	59	21	23	10	393	119
Coritiba	1978	Série A	20	1		6		1	—			8
Palmeiras	1979	Série A	0	0	0	0	3	0	6	1	9	1
Bangu	1980	Campeonato Carioca	0	0		3		2	—			5
Monterrey	1979–80	Liga MX	3	0	—		—		—		3	0
Career total			416	117		63		3	101	46		367

=== International ===
Appearances and goals by national team and year
National team	Year	Apps	Goals
Uruguay	1961	1	0
Uruguay	1962	5	0
Uruguay	1963	2	0
Uruguay	1964	0	0
Uruguay	1965	9	5
Uruguay	1966	7	1
Uruguay	1967	10	8
Uruguay	1968	8	1
Uruguay	1969	5	1
Uruguay	1970	2	1
Uruguay	1971	0	0
Uruguay	1972	0	0
Uruguay	1973	0	0
Uruguay	1974	3	0
Total		52	17

== Managerial statistics ==
Team	From	To	Record				
Team	From	To	G	W	D	L	Win %
Kyoto Purple Sanga	1997	1997	32	9	0	23	28.13
Total			32	9	0	23	28.13

== Honours ==
Peñarol

- Primera División: 1959, 1960, 1961, 1962, 1964, 1965, 1967, 1968
- Copa Libertadores: 1960, 1961, 1966
- Intercontinental Cup: 1961, 1966
- Intercontinental Champions' Supercup: 1969

São Paulo

- Campeonato Brasileiro Série A: 1977
- Campeonato Paulista: 1971, 1975

Uruguay

- Copa América: 1967

Individual

- Uruguayan Primera División Top Scorer: 1963, 1965, 1968
- Copa América Best Player: 1967
- Intercontinental Champions' Supercup Top Scorer: 1968, 1969
- Campeonato Brasileiro Top Scorer: 1972
- Bola de Prata: 1973
- Copa Libertadores Top Scorer: 1974
- IFFHS Uruguayan Men's Dream Team (Team B)

Preceded by Dadá Maravilha	Brazilian Championship Top Scorer; 1972	Succeeded by Ramon
