= Daniel Onega =

Argentine footballer

Daniel Germán Onega
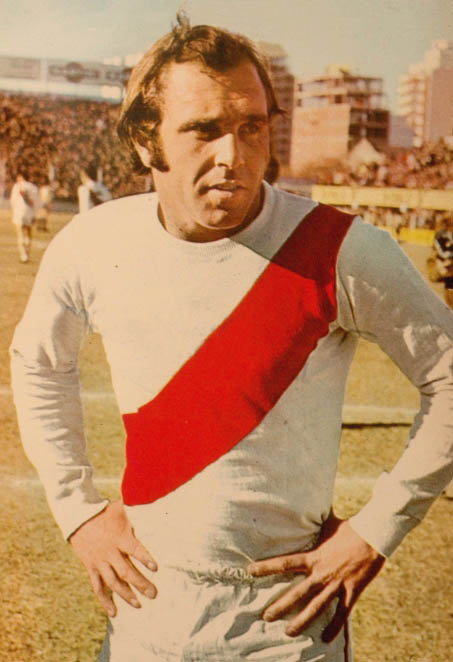
- Onega in 1970 while playing for River Plate

Personal information
- Full name: Daniel Germán Onega
- Date of birth: 17 March 1945 (age 81)
- Place of birth: Las Parejas, Argentina
- Position: Striker

Youth career
- River Plate

Senior career*
Years	Team	Apps	(Gls)
1965–1971	River Plate	207	(87)
1972	Racing Club	41	(9)
1973	River Plate	?	(?)
1973–1977	Córdoba CF	?	(1)
1978	Millonarios	?	(1)

International career
1966–1972	Argentina	13	(3)
- * Club domestic league appearances and goals

Daniel "Tito" Onega (born 17 March 1945) is a former Argentine professional football player who played as striker for most of his career for River Plate and for the Argentina national team between 1966 and 1972. Onega became the top scorer of the 1966 Copa Libertadores with 17 goals, setting the record for most goals scored in a single edition of the tournament.

He is also River Plate's all-time top scorer in international cups.

== Club career ==
Onega started his career at River Plate. It was with River Plate that he became the topscorer in the 1966 Copa Libertadores with 17 goals, setting the record for the most goals ever scored in a single season in that tournament, a record that has never been surpassed. He is also the 4th in the all time Copa Libertadores topscorers list with 31 goals in 47 games.

In 1972 Onega moved to Racing Club for a season, but he only managed 9 goals and returned to River the following season.

In 1973, he moved to Spain to play for Córdoba CF in the Spanish 2nd division, he stayed with the club until 1978 when he moved to Millonarios in Colombia. It was with Millonarios that he won his first and only league title. At the end of the 1978 season Onega retired from football.

== Personal life ==
He is the brother of the late midfielder Ermindo Onega.

== Honours ==
River Plate

- Copa Libertadores runner-up: 1966
- Argentine Primera División runner-up: 1966, 1968 Nacional, 1969 Metropolitano, 1969 Nacional, 1970 Metropolitano, 1973 Nacional

Racing

- Argentine Primera División runner-up: 1972 Metropolitano

Córdoba C. F.

- Trofeo Ciudad de Córdoba: 1975, 1976, 1977
- Trofeo Feria de Toledo: 1975

Millonarios

- Categoría Primera A: 1978
