= Juan Carlos Sarnari =

Argentine footballer (1942–2023)

- Sarnari at River Plate

Personal information
- Date of birth: 22 January 1942
- Place of birth: Santa Fe, Argentina
- Date of death: 21 April 2023 (aged 81)
- Place of death: Bogotá, Colombia
- Position: Midfielder

Senior career*
Years	Team	Apps	(Gls)
1959–1962	River Plate		
1963	Huracán		
1964–1967	River Plate		
1967–1969	Universidad Católica		
1970–1972	Universidad de Chile		(42)
1973	Independiente Medellín		
1975–1976	Independiente Santa Fe		
1977	Deportes La Serena		

International career
1966–1967	Argentina	6	(1)

Managerial career
- 1979–1980: Deportes Quindío
- 1981: Santa Fe
- 1982: Once Caldas
- * Club domestic league appearances and goals

Juan Carlos Sarnari (22 January 1942 – 21 April 2023) was an Argentine footballer who played as a midfielder. He scored 29 goals in the Copa Libertadores, making him the 6th-highest scoring player in Copa Libertadores history.

== Playing career ==
Sarnari started his career at River Plate at the age of 17. In 1963 he spent a season with Huracán. He returned to River in 1964.

In 1966 Sarnari was selected to represent the Argentina national team at the 1966 FIFA World Cup. He was capped 6 times and scored 1 goal.

In 1967 Sarnari moved to Chile where he played for Universidad Católica and Universidad de Chile, in 1973 Sanari moved to Colombia where he played for Independiente Medellín and Independiente Santa Fe. He won the 1975 league title with Santa Fe.

== Managerial career ==
Sarnari was the manager of several clubs in Colombia including Deportes Quindío, Independiente Santa Fe and Once Caldas.

== Death ==
Sarnari died in Bogotá, Colombia, on 21 April 2023, at the age of 81.

== Honours ==
Independiente Santa Fe

- Categoría Primera A: 1975
