= Luis Varela (footballer) =

Uruguayan footballer (1941–2021)

Personal information
- Full name: Luís Alberto Varela Marichal
- Date of birth: 22 August 1941
- Place of birth: Montevideo, Uruguay
- Date of death: 25 June 2021 (aged 79)
- Position: Defender

International career
Years	Team	Apps	(Gls)
1965–1971	Uruguay	7	(0)

Luis Varela (22 August 1941 – 25 June 2021) was a Uruguayan footballer. He played in seven matches for the Uruguay national football team from 1965 to 1971. He was also part of Uruguay's squad for the 1967 South American Championship.
