= Eladio Reyes =

Peruvian footballer (born 1948)

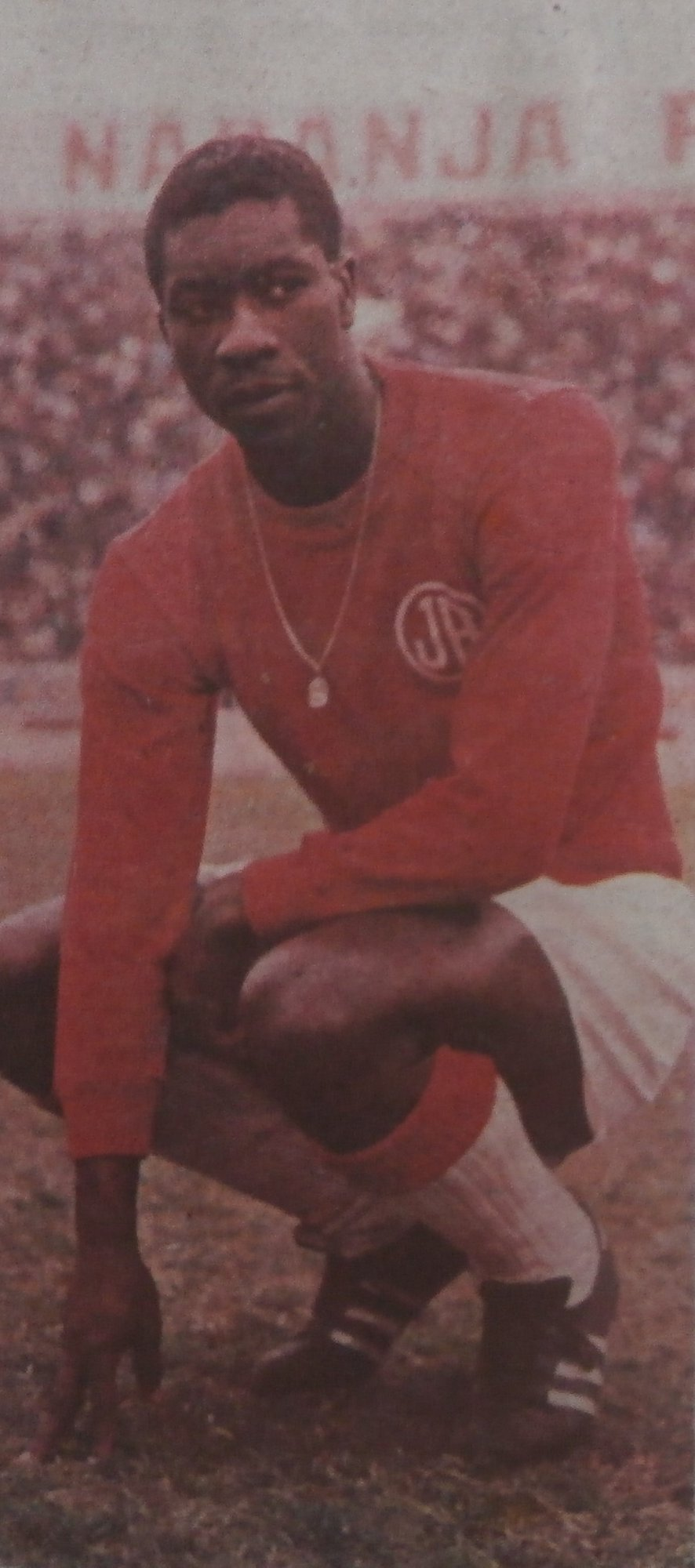
- Reyes playing for Juan Aurich

Personal information
- Full name: Máximo Eladio Reyes Caraza
- Date of birth: 8 January 1948 (age 78)
- Place of birth: Chincha, Peru
- Position: Forward

Senior career*
Years	Team	Apps	(Gls)
1965–1967	Alianza Lima		
1968–1971	Juan Aurich		
1972	Defensor Lima		
1973	Deportivo Municipal		
1974	Deportivo Cali	33	(10)
1975–1976	Veracruz	9	(1)
1976	Deportivo Municipal		
1977	Cienciano		
1977	Deportivo Galicia		
1978	Unión Huaral		

International career
1968–1970	Peru	7	(0)
- * Club domestic league appearances and goals

Máximo Eladio Reyes Caraza (born 8 January 1948) is a Peruvian football forward who played for Juan Aurich and Peru in the 1970 FIFA World Cup.

== Club career ==
He also played for Alianza Lima.

== International career ==
Reyes earned 7 caps for Peru, scoring no goals.
