= Renán López =

Bolivian footballer (1939–2023)

Personal information
- Full name: Renán López Echeverría
- Date of birth: 31 October 1939
- Place of birth: Cochabamba, Bolivia
- Date of death: 10 March 2023 (aged 83)
- Position: Midfielder

Senior career*
| Years | Team | Apps | (Gls) |
- Jorge Wilstermann

International career
| 1963–1967 | Bolivia | 7 | (0) |
- * Club domestic league appearances and goals

Renán López Echeverría (31 October 1939 – 10 March 2023) was a Bolivian footballer who played as a midfielder for Jorge Wilstermann. He made seven appearances for the Bolivia national team from 1963 to 1967. He was also part of Bolivia's squad that won the 1963 South American Championship.

López died on 10 March 2023, at the age of 83.
