= Reynaldo Aimonetti =

Argentine footballer

Personal information
- Full name: Reynaldo Silvio Aimonetti
- Date of birth: 5 February 1943 (age 83)
- Position: Forward

Senior career*
Years	Team	Apps	(Gls)
1963–1966	Boca Juniors	108	(33)
- * Club domestic league appearances and goals

Reynaldo Silvio Aimonetti (born 5 February 1943) is an Argentine former footballer. He played as a midfielder or forward during his 4-year career, during which he played for the Argentina national football team and Primera División club Boca Juniors.
