= Julio Abbadie =

Uruguayan footballer (1930-2014)

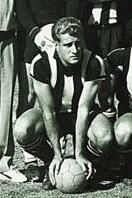
- Julio Abbadie in 1965

Personal information
- Full name: Julio César Abbadie Gismero
- Date of birth: 7 September 1930
- Place of birth: Montevideo, Uruguay
- Date of death: 16 July 2014 (aged 83)
- Height: 1.79 m (5 ft 10 1/2 in)
- Position: Forward

Senior career*
Years	Team	Apps	(Gls)
1950–1956	Peñarol	184	(74)
1956–1960	Genoa	110	(19)
1960–1962	Lecco	45	(5)
1962–1969	Peñarol	284	(63)
Total		623	(161)

International career
1952–1966	Uruguay	26	(14)
- * Club domestic league appearances and goals

Julio César Abbadie Gismero (7 September 1930 – 16 July 2014) was a Uruguayan footballer who played as a forward. During his career, he played for Peñarol, where he won the 1966 Copa Libertadores and the 1966 Intercontinental Cup. He was born in Uruguay to a French father and a Spanish mother.

== Club career ==
Born in Montevideo, Abbadie also played in Italy (from 1956 to 1962) with Genoa and Lecco. In total, he played Serie A 140 matches and scored 31 goals. On 21 December 2004 he returned after 54 years to Genova, at Stadio Luigi Ferraris, during Serie B match against Empoli.

== International career ==
For the Uruguay national team, Abbadie obtained 26 caps between 1952 and 1966, scoring 14 goals. He participated in the 1954 FIFA World Cup and scored two goals in a group match against Scotland.

== Career statistics ==
=== International ===
Appearances and goals by national team and year
National team	Year	Apps	Goals
Uruguay	1952	5	4
Uruguay	1953	1	1
Uruguay	1954	7	3
Uruguay	1955	5	3
Uruguay	1956	3	1
Uruguay	1957	0	0
Uruguay	1958	0	0
Uruguay	1959	0	0
Uruguay	1960	0	0
Uruguay	1961	0	0
Uruguay	1962	0	0
Uruguay	1963	1	0
Uruguay	1964	0	0
Uruguay	1965	2	0
Uruguay	1966	2	2
Total		26	14

== Honours ==
Peñarol

- Uruguayan Primera División (8): 1951, 1953, 1954, 1962, 1964, 1965, 1967, 1968
- Copa Libertadores (1): 1966
- Intercontinental Cup (1): 1966
