= Lucio Calonga =

Paraguayan footballer (1939–2007)

Personal information
- Date of birth: 13 December 1939
- Place of birth: Asunción, Paraguay
- Date of death: 28 February 2007 (aged 67)
- Position: Midfielder

International career
Years	Team	Apps	(Gls)
1962–1963	Paraguay	7	(0)

Lucio Calonga (13 December 1939 – 28 February 2007) was a Paraguayan footballer. He played in seven matches for the Paraguay national football team from 1962 to 1963. He was also part of Paraguay's squad for the 1963 South American Championship.
