= Omar Caetano =

Uruguayan footballer (1938-2008)

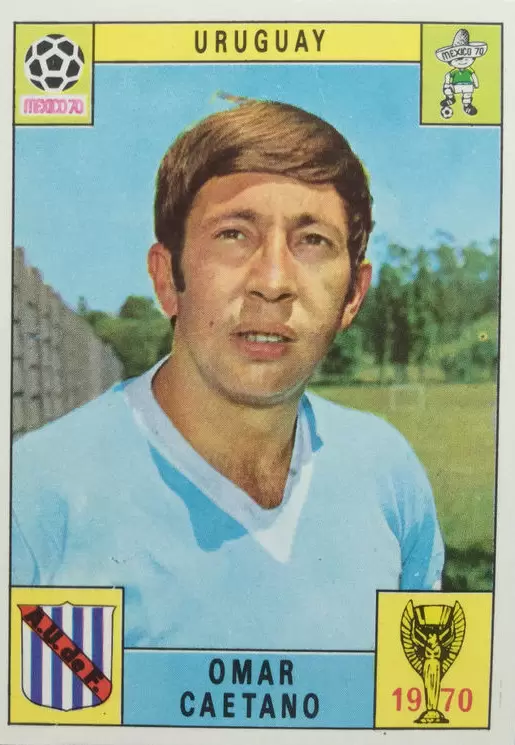
- Caetano in the 1970 FIFA World Cup

Personal information
- Full name: Omar Caetano Otero
- Date of birth: 8 November 1938
- Place of birth: Uruguay
- Date of death: 2 July 2008 (aged 69)
- Place of death: Uruguay
- Height: 1.67 m (5 ft 6 in)
- Position: Midfielder

Senior career*
Years	Team	Apps	(Gls)
1961–1975	Peñarol		
1975	New York Cosmos	8	(0)

International career
1965–1969	Uruguay	30	(0)
- * Club domestic league appearances and goals

Omar Caetano Otero (8 November 1938 – 2 July 2008) was a Uruguayan footballer. He represented Uruguay at the 1966 FIFA World Cup and 1970 FIFA World Cup.

He played club football with Peñarol, where he won 8 league titles, 4 major international titles and played in a record 57 derby matches against rivals Nacional. He also spent the 1975 season in the NASL with the New York Cosmos.
