= Guery Agreda =

Bolivian footballer (born 1942)

Personal information
- Date of birth: 19 January 1942 (age 84)
- Place of birth: Cochabamba, Bolivia

International career
| Years | Team | Apps | (Gls) |
| 1967–1973 | Bolivia | 13 | (0) |

Guery Agreda (born 19 January 1942) is a Bolivian footballer. He was part of Bolivia's squad for the 1967 South American Championship.
