= 1962 Campeonato Uruguayo Primera División =

59th season of the top-tier football league in Uruguay

Statistics of Primera División Uruguaya for the 1962 season.

== Overview ==
The division was contested by 10 teams, and Peñarol won the championship.

== League standings ==
Pos	Team	Pld	W	D	L	GF	GA	GD	Pts
1	Peñarol	18	16	1	1	54	9	+45	33
2	Nacional	18	12	3	3	43	24	+19	27
3	Fénix	18	8	2	8	25	36	−11	18
4	Defensor	18	5	7	6	28	23	+5	17
5	Racing Montevideo	18	4	9	5	30	33	−3	17
6	Cerro	18	6	5	7	25	29	−4	17
7	Rampla Juniors	18	6	3	9	24	33	−9	15
8	Liverpool	18	5	5	8	24	37	−13	15
9	Central	18	4	3	11	19	31	−12	11
10	Danubio	18	4	2	12	17	34	−17	10

Source: rsssf.com
