= Copa Libertadores =

South American association football tournament

CONMEBOL Libertadores
- Organizer(s): CONMEBOL
- Founded: 1960; 66 years ago
- Region: South America
- Teams: 47 (from 10 associations)
- Qualifier for: FIFA Club World Cup; FIFA Intercontinental Cup; Recopa Sudamericana
- Related competitions: Copa Sudamericana (2nd tier)
- Current champion(s): (Brazil) Flamengo (4th title)
- Most championships: (Argentina) Independiente (7 titles)
- Motto: The Eternal Glory (La Gloria Eterna / A Glória Eterna)
- Website: conmebollibertadores.com
- 2026 Copa Libertadores

The CONMEBOL Libertadores, also known as the Copa Libertadores de América (Portuguese: Copa/Taça Libertadores da América), and most commonly shortened to Copa Libertadores, is an annual continental club football competition organized by CONMEBOL since 1960. It is the highest level of competition in South American club football. The tournament is named after the Libertadores (Spanish and Portuguese for "liberators"), the leaders of the Spanish American wars of independence and Brazilian independence, so a literal translation of its former name into English is "Liberators Cup".

The competition has had several formats over its lifetime. Initially, only the champions of the South American leagues participated. In 1966, the runners-up of the South American leagues began to join. In 1998, Mexican teams were invited to compete and competed regularly from 2000 until 2016. In 2000, the tournament was expanded from 20 to 32 teams. Today at least four clubs per country compete in the tournament, with Argentina and Brazil having the most representatives (six and seven clubs, respectively). A group stage has always been used but the number of teams per group has varied.

In the present format, the tournament consists of eight stages, with the first stage taking place in late January. The four surviving teams from the first three stages join 28 teams in the group stage, which consists of eight groups of four teams each. The eight group winners and eight runners-up enter the knockout stages, which end with the final in November. The winner of the Copa Libertadores becomes eligible to play in the FIFA Club World Cup, FIFA Intercontinental Cup and the Recopa Sudamericana.

Independiente of Argentina is the most successful club in the cup's history, having won the tournament seven times. Argentine and Brazilian clubs have accumulated the most victories with 25 wins each, while Brazil has the largest number of winning teams, with 12 clubs winning the title. The cup has been won by 27 clubs; 15 of them have won it more than once, and seven clubs have won two years in a row. Brazilian clubs currently hold a record-breaking winning streak (seven Copa Libertadores in a row, starting in 2019).

== History ==
List of winners
Season	Winners
Copa Libertadores
1960	(Uruguay) Peñarol
1961	(Uruguay) Peñarol (2)
1962	(Brazil) Santos
1963	(Brazil) Santos (2)
1964	(Argentina) Independiente
1965	(Argentina) Independiente (2)
1966	(Uruguay) Peñarol (3)
1967	(Argentina) Racing
1968	(Argentina) Estudiantes
1969	(Argentina) Estudiantes (2)
1970	(Argentina) Estudiantes (3)
1971	(Uruguay) Nacional
1972	(Argentina) Independiente (3)
1973	(Argentina) Independiente (4)
1974	(Argentina) Independiente (5)
1975	(Argentina) Independiente (6)
1976	(Brazil) Cruzeiro
1977	(Argentina) Boca Juniors
1978	(Argentina) Boca Juniors (2)
1979	(Paraguay) Olimpia
1980	(Uruguay) Nacional (2)
1981	(Brazil) Flamengo
1982	(Uruguay) Peñarol (4)
1983	(Brazil) Grêmio
1984	(Argentina) Independiente (7)
1985	(Argentina) Argentinos Juniors
1986	(Argentina) River Plate
1987	(Uruguay) Peñarol (5)
1988	(Uruguay) Nacional (3)
1989	(Colombia) Atlético Nacional
1990	(Paraguay) Olimpia (2)
1991	(Chile) Colo-Colo
1992	(Brazil) São Paulo FC
1993	(Brazil) São Paulo FC (2)
1994	(Argentina) Vélez Sarsfield
1995	(Brazil) Grêmio (2)
1996	(Argentina) River Plate (2)
1997	(Brazil) Cruzeiro (2)
1998	(Brazil) Vasco da Gama
1999	(Brazil) Palmeiras
2000	(Argentina) Boca Juniors (3)
2001	(Argentina) Boca Juniors (4)
2002	(Paraguay) Olimpia (3)
2003	(Argentina) Boca Juniors (5)
2004	(Colombia) Once Caldas
2005	(Brazil) São Paulo FC (3)
2006	(Brazil) Internacional
2007	(Argentina) Boca Juniors (6)
2008	(Ecuador) LDU Quito
2009	(Argentina) Estudiantes (4)
2010	(Brazil) Internacional (2)
2011	(Brazil) Santos (3)
2012	(Brazil) Corinthians
2013	(Brazil) Atlético Mineiro
2014	(Argentina) San Lorenzo
2015	(Argentina) River Plate (3)
2016	(Colombia) Atlético Nacional (2)
2017	(Brazil) Grêmio (3)
2018	(Argentina) River Plate (4)
2019	(Brazil) Flamengo (2)
2020	(Brazil) Palmeiras (2)
2021	(Brazil) Palmeiras (3)
2022	(Brazil) Flamengo (3)
2023	(Brazil) Fluminense
2024	(Brazil) Botafogo
2025	(Brazil) Flamengo (4)

The clashes for the Copa Aldao between the champions of Argentina and Uruguay kindled the idea of continental competition in the 1930s. In 1948, the South American Championship of Champions (Spanish: Campeonato Sudamericano de Campeones), the most direct precursor to the Copa Libertadores, was played and organized by the Chilean club Colo-Colo after years of planning and organization. Held in Santiago, it brought together the champions of each nation's top national leagues. The tournament was won by Vasco da Gama of Brazil. The 1948 South American tournament began, in continent-wide reach, the "champions cup" model, resulting in the creation of the European Cup in 1955, as confirmed by Jacques Ferran (one of the "founding fathers" of the European Cup), in a 2015 interview with a Brazilian TV sports programme. The connection between the 1948 competition and the Copa Libertadores was recognised by Conmebol with the participation of Vasco da Gama in the 1997 Supercopa Libertadores, a Conmebol competition that accepted the participation of Copa Libertadores winners only, and the 1948 championship is referred to at the Conmebol website as the competition that, 12 years later, would become the Copa Libertadores.

In 1958, the basis and format of the competition were created by Peñarol's board leaders. On October 8, 1958, João Havelange announced, at a UEFA meeting he attended as an invitee, the creation of Copa de Campeones de America (American Champions Cup, renamed in 1965 as Copa Libertadores), as a South American equivalent of the European Cup, so that the champion clubs of both continental confederations could decide "the best club team of the world" in the Intercontinental Cup. On March 5, 1959, at the 24th South American Congress held in Buenos Aires, the competition was ratified by the International Affairs Committee. In 1965, it was named in honor of the heroes of South American liberation, such as Simón Bolívar, José de San Martín, Pedro I, Bernardo O'Higgins, and José Gervasio Artigas, among others.

== Format ==
=== Qualification ===
Most teams qualify for the Copa Libertadores by winning half-year tournaments called the Apertura and Clausura tournaments or by finishing among the top teams in their championship. The countries that use this format are Bolivia, Colombia, Ecuador, Paraguay, Peru, Uruguay and Venezuela. Peru and Ecuador have developed new formats for qualification to the Copa Libertadores involving several stages. Argentina, Brazil and Chile are the only South American leagues to use a European league format instead of the Apertura and Clausura format. However, one berth for the Copa Libertadores can be won by winning the domestic cups in these countries.

Peru, Uruguay and Mexico formerly used a second tournament to decide qualification for the Libertadores (the "Liguilla Pre-Libertadores" between 1992 and 1997, the "Liguilla Pre-Libertadores de América" from 1974 to 2009, and the InterLiga from 2004 to 2010, respectively). Argentina used an analogous method only once in 1992. Since 2011, the winner of the Copa Sudamericana has qualified automatically for the following Copa Libertadores.

For the 2019 edition, the different stages of the competition were contested by the following teams:

Distribution of clubs in the Copa Libertadores
First stage

Bolivia

- Runners-up of Torneo Apertura

Ecuador

- Winner Copa Ecuador

Paraguay

- Second-best non-champion Primera División season aggregate

Peru

- Fourth-placed team of Liga 1

Uruguay

- Second-best Primera División season aggregate

Venezuela

- Second-best Primera División season aggregate

Second stage

- 3 first stage winners

Argentina

- Fourth-placed team of Liga Profesional de Fútbol

Bolivia

- Runners-up of Torneo Clausura

Brazil

- Fifth-placed team of Campeonato Brasileiro Série A
- Sixth-placed team of Campeonato Brasileiro Série A

Chile

- Third-placed team of Chilean Primera División
- Champions of Copa Chile

Colombia

- Best non-champion Primera A season aggregate
- Champions of Copa Colombia

Ecuador

- Best Serie A season aggregate

Paraguay

- Best non-champion Primera División season aggregate

Peru

- Third-placed team of Liga 1

Uruguay

- Best Primera División season aggregate

Venezuela

- Best Primera División season aggregate

Third stage
- 8 second stage winners

Group stage

- Defending champions
- Winners of the Copa Sudamericana
- 4 third stage winners

Argentina

- Champions of Liga Profesional de Fútbol
- Champions of Copa Argentina
- Champions of Copa de la Liga
- Runners-up of Liga Profesional de Fútbol
- Third-placed team of Liga Profesional de Fútbol

Bolivia

- Champions of Torneo Apertura
- Champions of Torneo Clausura

Brazil

- Champions of Campeonato Brasileiro Série A
- Champions of Copa do Brasil
- Runners-up of Campeonato Brasileiro Série A
- Third-placed team of Campeonato Brasileiro Série A
- Fourth-placed team of Campeonato Brasileiro Série A

Chile

- Champions of Chilean Primera División
- Runners-up of Chilean Primera División

Colombia

- Champions of Torneo Apertura
- Champions of Torneo Finalización

Ecuador

- Champions of Serie A
- Runners-up of Serie A

Paraguay

- Best Primera División champion season aggregate
- Second-best Primera División champion season aggregate

Peru

- Champions of Liga 1
- Runners-up of Liga 1

Uruguay

- Champions of Primera División
- Runners-up of Primera División

Venezuela

- Champions of Primera División Serie Final
- Runners-up of Primera División Serie Final

Final stages

- 8 group winners
- 8 group runners-up

Country	First Stage	Second Stage	Group Stage
Brazil		2	5
Argentina		1	5
Chile		2	2
Colombia		2	2
Bolivia	1	1	2
Ecuador	1	1	2
Paraguay	1	1	2
Peru	1	1	2
Uruguay	1	1	2
Venezuela	1	1	2

The winners of the previous season's Copa Libertadores are given an additional entry to the group stage even if they do not qualify for the tournament through their domestic performance; however, if the title holders qualify for the tournament through their domestic performance, an additional entry is granted to the next eligible team, "replacing" the titleholder.

=== Rules ===
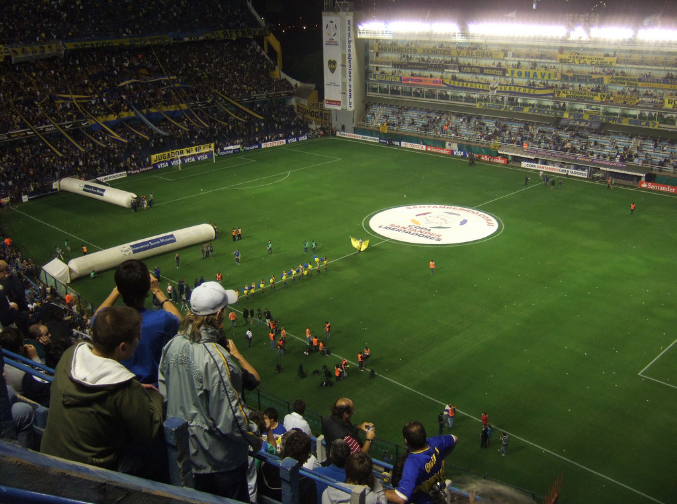
The Copa Libertadores logo is shown on the centre of the pitch before every game in the competition.

Unlike most other football competitions around the world, the Copa Libertadores historically did not use extra time, or away goals. From 1960 to 1987, two-legged ties were decided on points (teams would be awarded 2 points for a win, 1 point for a draw and 0 points for a loss), without considering goal differences. If both teams were level on points after two legs, a third match would be played at a neutral venue. Goal difference would only come into play if the third match was drawn. If the third match did not produce an outright winner, a penalty shootout was used to determine a winner.

From 1988 onwards, two-legged ties were decided on points, followed by goal difference, with an immediate penalty shootout if the tie was level on aggregate after full-time in the second leg. Starting with the 2005 season, CONMEBOL began to use the away goals rule. In 2008, the finals became an exception to the away goals rule and employed extra time. From 1995 onwards, the "Three points for a win" standard, a system adopted by FIFA in 1995 that places additional value on wins, was adopted in CONMEBOL, with teams now earning 3 points for a win, 1 point for a draw and 0 points for a loss.

=== Tournament ===
The current tournament features 47 clubs competing over a six- to eight-month period. There are three stages: the first, the second and the knockout stage.

The first stage involves 12 clubs in a series of two-legged knockout ties. The six survivors join 26 clubs in the second stage, in which they are divided into eight groups of four. The teams in each group play in a double round-robin format, with each team playing home and away games against every other team in their group. The top two teams from each group are then drawn into the knockout stage, which consists of two-legged knockout ties. From that point, the competition proceeds with two-legged knockout ties to quarterfinals, semifinals, and the finals. Between 1960 and 1987 the previous winners did not enter the competition until the semifinal stage, making it much easier to retain the cup.

Between 1960 and 2004, the winner of the tournament participated in the now-defunct Intercontinental Cup or (after 1980) Toyota Cup, a football competition endorsed by UEFA and CONMEBOL, contested against the winners of the European Cup (since renamed the UEFA Champions League) Since 2004, the winner has played in the Club World Cup, an international competition contested by the champion clubs from all six continental confederations. It is organized by the Fédération Internationale de Football Association (FIFA), the sport's global governing body. Because Europe and South America are considered the strongest centers of the sport, the champions of those continents enter the tournament at the semifinal stage. The winning team also qualifies to play in the Recopa Sudamericana, a two-legged final series against the winners of the Copa Sudamericana.

== Prizes ==
=== Trophy ===
The tournament shares its name with the trophy, also called the Copa Libertadores or simply la Copa, which is awarded to the Copa Libertadores winner. It was designed by goldsmith Alberto de Gasperi, an Italian-born immigrant to Peru, in Camusso Jewelry in Lima at the behest of CONMEBOL. The top of the laurel is made of sterling silver, except for the football player at the top (which is made of bronze with a silver coating).

The pedestal, which contains badges from every winner of the competition, is made of hardwood plywood. The badges show the season, the full name of the winning club, and the city and nation from which the champions hail. To the left of that information is the club logo. Any club which wins three consecutive tournaments has the right to keep the trophy. The current trophy is the third in the history of the competition.

Two clubs have kept the actual trophy after three consecutive wins:

- Estudiantes after their third consecutive win in 1970. They won a fourth title in 2009.
- Independiente after their third consecutive win, and fifth overall, in 1974. They have since won two more titles, in 1975 and 1984.

=== Prize money ===
As of 2023, clubs in the Copa Libertadores receive US$500,000 for advancing into the second stage and US$1,000,000 per home match in the group phase, with an additional US$300,000 awarded per match won in that stage. That amount is derived from television rights and stadium advertising. The payment per home match increases to US$1,250,000 in the round of 16. The prize money then increases as each quarterfinalist receives US$1,700,000, US$2,300,000 is given to each semifinalist, US$7,000,000 is awarded to the runner-up, and the winner earns US$18,000,000.

- Eliminated at the first stage: US$400,000
- Eliminated at the second stage: US$500,000
- Eliminated at the third stage: US$600,000
- Group stage: US$3,000,000
- Group stage win: US$300,000
- Round of 16: US$1,250,000
- Quarter-finals: US$1,700,000
- Semi-finals: US$2,300,000
- Runners-up: US$7,000,000
- Champions: US$18,000,000

== Cultural impact ==
The Copa Libertadores occupies an important space in South American culture. The folklore, fanfare, and organization of many football competitions around the world owe several aspects to the Libertadores.

=== The "Sueño Libertador" ===
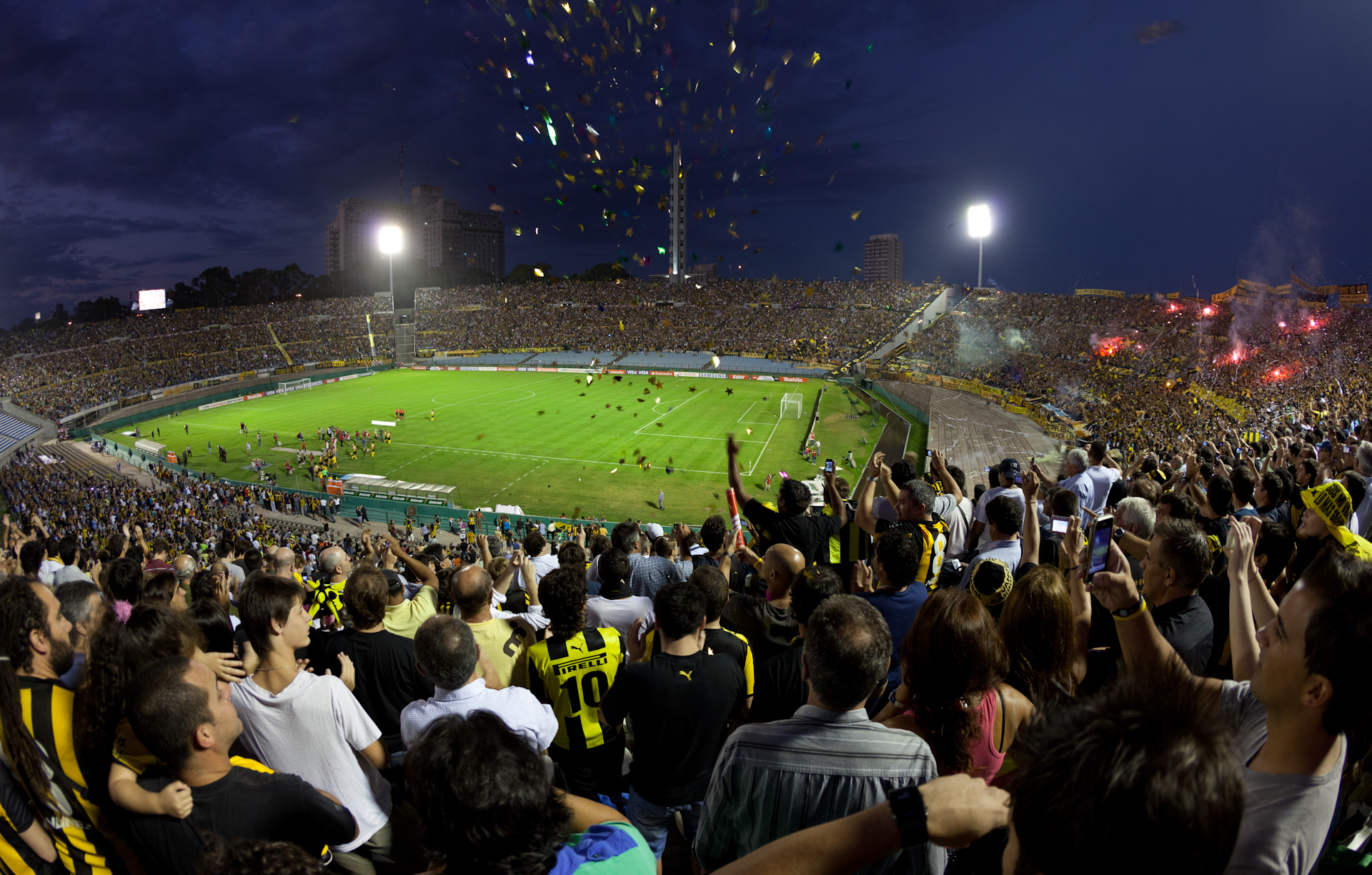
Estadio Centenario during a Copa Libertadores match.

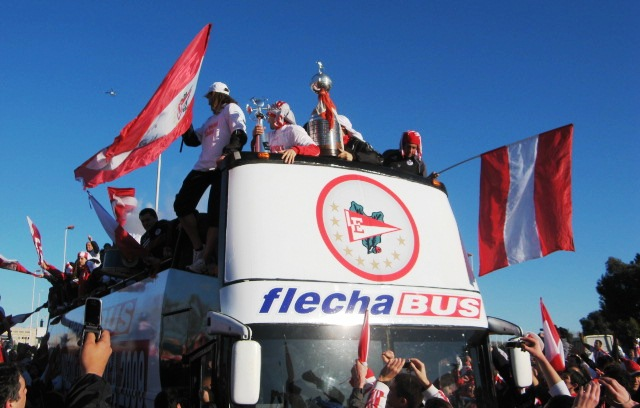
Estudiantes fans celebrating their 2009 title win.

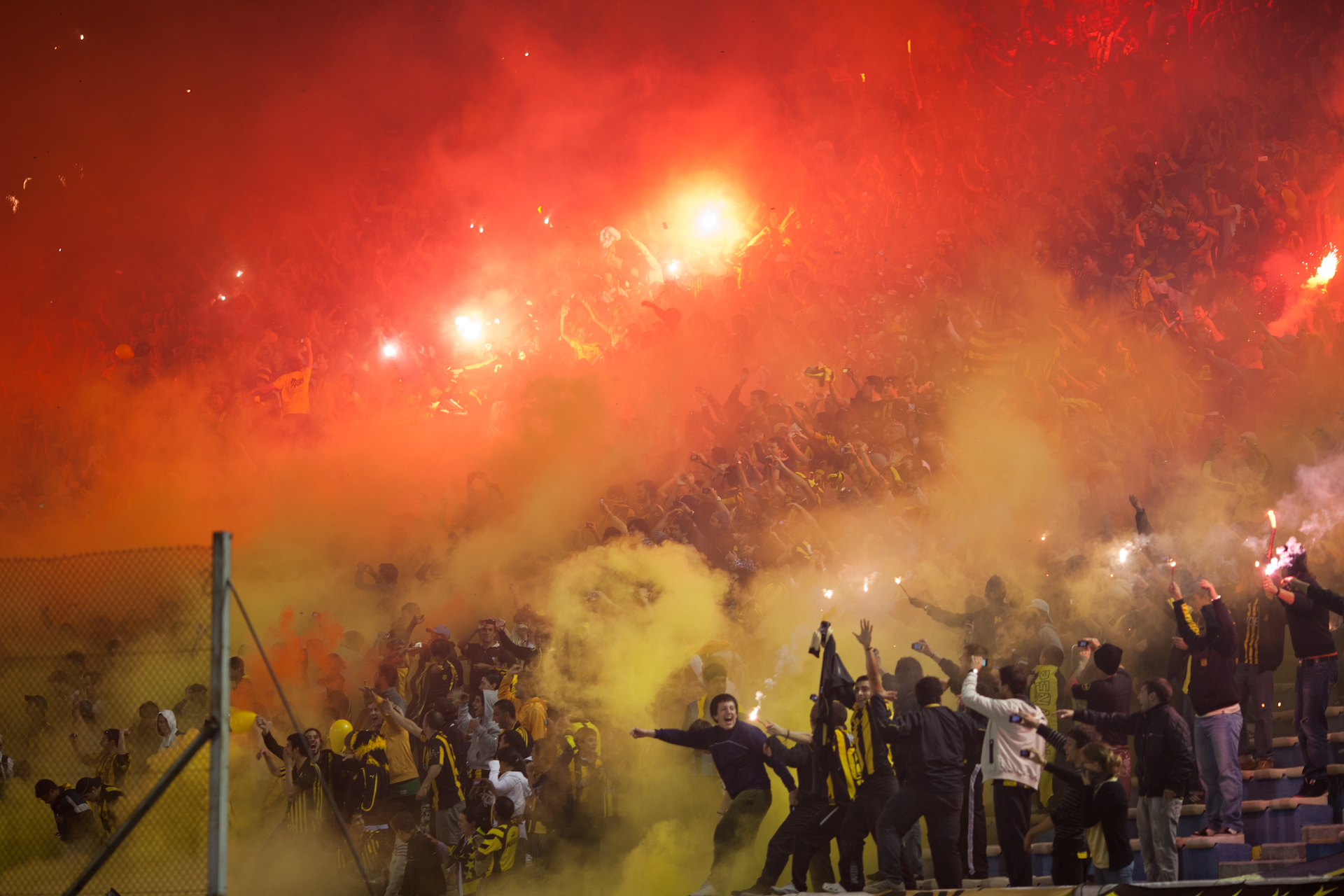
Since its inception, the Copa Libertadores has been an integral part of South American football culture.

The Sueño Libertador ("Liberator Dream") is a promotional phrase frequently used in sports journalism to refer to the pursuit or accomplishment of winning the Copa Libertadores. When a team is eliminated from the competition, media outlets often report that the team has "awakened from the liberator dream." The project typically begins after a club wins its national league, securing qualification for the following edition of the tournament.

It is common for participating clubs to invest heavily in roster squad assembly to secure the trophy. For example, in 1998, Vasco da Gama spent $10 million to construct a winning squad, while Palmeiras, managed by Luiz Felipe Scolari, brought in Júnior Baiano among other high-profile signings before winning the 1999 Copa Libertadores.

The tournament holds immense prestige among players and supporters across the continent. In 2010, players from Guadalajara stated that they prioritized playing in the Copa Libertadores final over appearing in a friendly against the Spanish national team, who were the reigning world champions at the time, or domestic league fixtures. Similarly, following their victory in the 2010 Copa do Brasil, several Santos players expressed a desire to remain with the club to participate in the 2011 Copa Libertadores, despite lucrative offers from prominent UEFA Champions League clubs such as Chelsea and Lyon.

Former Boca Juniors goalkeeper Óscar Córdoba stated that the Copa Libertadores was the most prestigious title he won during his career, placing its significance above his domestic league titles and the Intercontinental Cup.

=== "La Copa se mira y no se toca" ===
From its inception in 1960 through the late 1970s, the Copa Libertadores was won exclusively by clubs from South American countries with Atlantic coastlines: Argentina, Brazil, and Uruguay. Olimpia of Paraguay became the first club outside these nations to win the tournament in 1979.

The first team from a country bordering the Pacific Ocean to reach a final was Universitario of Lima, Peru, who lost in 1972 to Independiente of Argentina. The following year, Independiente defeated Colo-Colo of Chile, another Pacific nation, giving rise to the popular taunt, "La Copa se mira y no se toca" (Spanish: The Cup is to be seen, not touched). Unión Española became the third Pacific-based club to reach the final in 1975, though they were also defeated by Independiente.

Atlético Nacional of Medellín, Colombia, became the first Pacific-adjacent nation to win the tournament in 1989. Subsequently, Colo-Colo became the first Chilean club to win the title in 1991, prompting supporters in Chile to adapt the popular phrase to "La Copa se mira y se toca" (Spanish: The Cup is seen and touched). Other clubs from Pacific-facing nations to win the title include Once Caldas of Colombia (2004) and LDU Quito of Ecuador (2008), while Barcelona SC of Ecuador reached the final in 1990 and 1998.

== Media coverage ==
Matches are broadcast in over 135 countries, with commentary in more than 30 languages, and thus the Copa is often considered one of the most watched sports events on TV;

=== Broadcasting rights ===
Region	Broadcaster	Language
Argentina	ESPN; Fox Sports	Spanish
Brazil	ESPN; TV Globo	Portuguese
Canada	beIN Sports	English/French
Bolivia	ESPN	Spanish
Chile	ESPN	Spanish
Colombia	ESPN	Spanish
Costa Rica	ESPN	Spanish
Dominican Republic	ESPN	Spanish
Ecuador	ESPN	Spanish
El Salvador	ESPN	Spanish
Guatemala	ESPN	Spanish
Honduras	ESPN	Spanish
Mexico	ESPN	Spanish
Nicaragua	ESPN	Spanish
Panama	ESPN	Spanish
Paraguay	ESPN	Spanish
Peru	ESPN	Spanish
Uruguay	ESPN	Spanish
Venezuela	ESPN	Spanish
United States	beIN Sports	English/Spanish (through 2026)
United States	Univision/TUDN	Spanish (beginning in 2027)

=== Video game ===
The current license holder for the Copa Libertadores video game is EA Sports with the EA Sports FC series since 2023. The license also includes the competing teams. Formerly, the game appeared in EA Sports's FIFA series from 2020 to 2023 and Konami's Pro Evolution Soccer from 2010 to 2016.

== Sponsorship ==
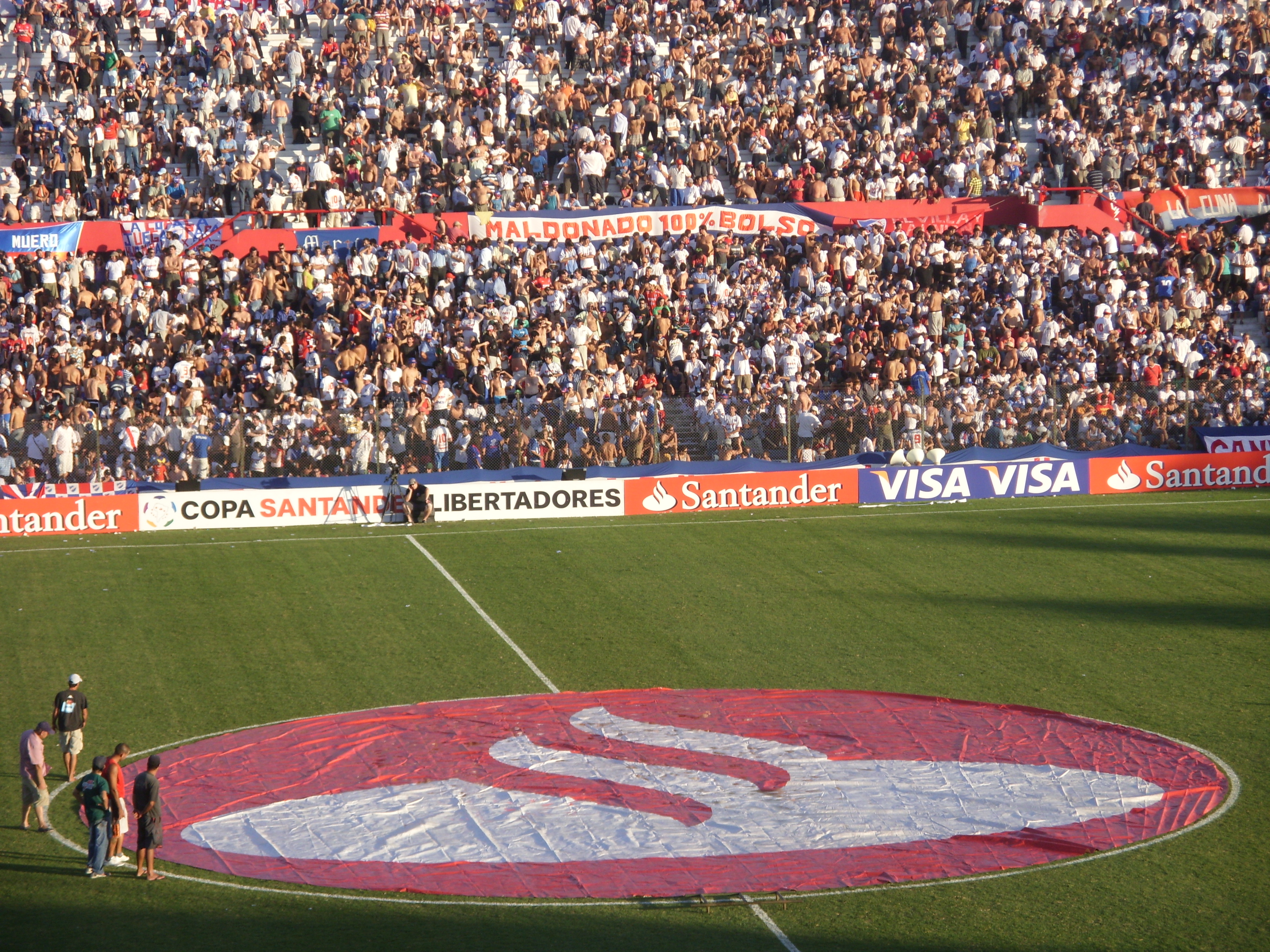
The logo of Banco Santander displayed on the field of Estadio Gran Parque Central, 2010

From 1997 to 2017, the competition had a single main sponsor for naming rights. The first major sponsor was Toyota, who signed a ten-year contract with CONMEBOL in 1997. The second major sponsor was Banco Santander, who signed a five-year contract with CONMEBOL in 2008. The third and final title sponsor was Bridgestone, who signed a sponsorship deal for naming rights for a period of five years from 2013 edition to 2017.

As of 2024, the sponsors of Copa Libertadores are:

Official Sponsors

- Amstel Brewery
- Coca-Cola
  - Powerade
- Crypto.com
- EA Sports
- Hyundai
- Mapfre
- Mastercard
- Mercado Libre
- TCL Technology

Official Partners

- Avianca
- Absolut Sport
- DHL
- Puma
- Puma Energy
- Rexona

Official Licensee

- Panini Group

== Match ball ==
German company Puma supplies the official match ball since 2024, as they do for all other CONMEBOL competitions. This partnership ended CONMEBOL's previous 20-year tenure with Nike.

Puma Cumbre is the official match ball of the 2024 edition of both Copa Libertadores and Copa Sudamericana.

== Records and statistics ==
The data below does not include the 1948 South American Championship of Champions, as it is not listed by Conmebol either as a Copa Libertadores edition or as an official competition. However, at least in the years 1996/1997, Conmebol entitled equal status to both Copa Libertadores and the 1948 tournament, in that the 1948 champion club (CR Vasco da Gama) was allowed to participate in Supercopa Libertadores, a Conmebol official competition that allowed participation for former Libertadores champions only (for example, not admitting participation for champions of other Conmebol official competitions, such as Copa CONMEBOL).

=== List of finals ===
- From 1960 to 1987 the winner was defined by points (2 per win, 1 per draw), with a third match if necessary.
- From 1989 to 2018 the winner was defined by goal difference, with no playoff held.
- From 2019, the final was played under a single match.

Keys

- Playoff result
- Aggregate score (only indicated in case both teams were tied on points)
- Defined on penalty shoot-out in the second leg

Year	Winners	1st. leg	2nd. leg	Playoff/ Agg.	Runners-up	Venue (1st leg)	City (1st leg)	Venue (2nd leg)	City (2nd leg)	Venue (Playoff)	City (Playoff)
1960	(Uruguay) Peñarol	1–0	1–1	–	(Paraguay) Olimpia	Centenario	Montevideo	Manuel Ferreira	Asunción	–	
1961	(Uruguay) Peñarol	1–0	1–1	–	(Brazil) Palmeiras	Centenario	Montevideo	Pacaembu	São Paulo	–	
1962	(Brazil) Santos	2–1	2–3	3–0	(Uruguay) Peñarol	Villa Belmiro	Santos	Centenario	Montevideo	Monumental	Buenos Aires
1963	(Brazil) Santos	3–2	2–1	–	(Argentina) Boca Juniors	Maracanã	Rio de Janeiro	Bombonera	Buenos Aires	–	
1964	(Argentina) Independiente	0–0	1–0	–	(Uruguay) Nacional	Centenario	Montevideo	Independiente	Avellaneda	–	
1965	(Argentina) Independiente	1–0	1–3	4–1	(Uruguay) Peñarol	Independiente	Avellaneda	Centenario	Montevideo	Nacional	Santiago
1966	(Uruguay) Peñarol	2–0	2–3	4–2	(Argentina) River Plate	Centenario	Montevideo	Monumental	Buenos Aires	Nacional	Santiago
1967	(Argentina) Racing	0–0	0–0	2–1	(Uruguay) Nacional	Cilindro	Avellaneda	Centenario	Montevideo	Nacional	Santiago
1968	(Argentina) Estudiantes	2–1	1–3	2–0	(Brazil) Palmeiras	Estudiantes	La Plata	Pacaembu	São Paulo	Centenario	Montevideo
1969	(Argentina) Estudiantes	1–0	2–0	–	(Uruguay) Nacional	Centenario	Montevideo	Estudiantes	La Plata	–	
1970	(Argentina) Estudiantes	1–0	0–0	–	(Uruguay) Peñarol	Estudiantes	La Plata	Centenario	Montevideo	–	
1971	(Uruguay) Nacional	0–1	1–0	2–0	(Argentina) Estudiantes	Estudiantes	La Plata	Centenario	Montevideo	Nacional	Lima
1972	(Argentina) Independiente	0–0	2–1	–	(Peru) Universitario	Nacional	Lima	Independiente	Avellaneda	–	
1973	(Argentina) Independiente	1–1	0–0	2–1	(Chile) Colo Colo	Independiente	Avellaneda	Nacional	Santiago	Centenario	Montevideo
1974	(Argentina) Independiente	1–2	2–0	1–0	(Brazil) São Paulo	Pacaembu	São Paulo	Independiente	Avellaneda	Nacional	Santiago
1975	(Argentina) Independiente	0–1	3–1	2–0	(Chile) Unión Española	Nacional	Santiago	Independiente	Avellaneda	Defensores del Chaco	Asunción
1976	(Brazil) Cruzeiro	4–1	1–2	3–2	(Argentina) River Plate	Mineirão	Belo Horizonte	Monumental	Buenos Aires	Nacional	Santiago
1977	(Argentina) Boca Juniors	1–0	0–1	0–0 (5–4 (p))	(Brazil) Cruzeiro	Bombonera	Buenos Aires	Mineirão	Belo Horizonte	Centenario	Montevideo
1978	(Argentina) Boca Juniors	0–0	4–0	–	(Colombia) Deportivo Cali	Pascual Guerrero	Cali	Bombonera	Buenos Aires	–	
1979	(Paraguay) Olimpia	2–0	0–0	–	(Argentina) Boca Juniors	Defefensores del Chaco	Asunción	Bombonera	Buenos Aires	–	
1980	(Uruguay) Nacional	0–0	1–0	–	(Brazil) Internacional	Beira-Rio	Porto Alegre	Centenario	Montevideo	–	
1981	(Brazil) Flamengo	2–1	0–1	2–0	(Chile) Cobreloa	Maracanã	Rio de Janeiro	Nacional	Santiago	Centenario	Montevideo
1982	(Uruguay) Peñarol	0–0	1–0	–	(Chile) Cobreloa	Centenario	Montevideo	Nacional	Santiago	–	
1983	(Brazil) Grêmio	1–1	2–1	–	(Uruguay) Peñarol	Centenario	Montevideo	Olímpico	Porto Alegre	–	
1984	(Argentina) Independiente	1–0	0–0	–	(Brazil) Grêmio	Olímpico	Porto Alegre	Independiente	Avellaneda	–	
1985	(Argentina) Argentinos Juniors	1–0	0–1	1–1 (5–4 (p))	(Colombia) América de Cali	Monumental	Buenos Aires	Pascual Guerrero	Cali	Defensores del Chaco	Asunción
1986	(Argentina) River Plate	2–1	1–0	–	(Colombia) América de Cali	Pascual Guerrero	Cali	Monumental	Buenos Aires	–	
1987	(Uruguay) Peñarol	0–2	2–1	1–0	(Colombia) América de Cali	Pascual Guerrero	Cali	Centenario	Montevideo	Nacional	Santiago
1988	(Uruguay) Nacional	0–1	3–0	3–1	(Argentina) Newell's Old Boys	Gigante de Arroyito	Rosario	Centenario	Montevideo	–	
1989	(Colombia) Atlético Nacional	0–2	2–0	5–4 (p)	(Paraguay) Olimpia	Defensores del Chaco	Asunción	El Campín	Bogotá	–	
1990	(Paraguay) Olimpia	2–0	1–1	–	(Ecuador) Barcelona	Defensores del Chaco	Asunción	Monumental	Guayaquil	–	
1991	(Chile) Colo Colo	0–0	3–0	–	(Paraguay) Olimpia	Defensores del Chaco	Asunción	David Arellano	Santiago	–	
1992	(Brazil) São Paulo	0–1	1–0	3–2 (p)	(Argentina) Newell's Old Boys	Gigante de Arroyito	Rosario	Morumbi	São Paulo	–	
1993	(Brazil) São Paulo	5–1	0–2	5–3	(Chile) Universidad Católica	Morumbi	São Paulo	Nacional	Santiago	–	
1994	(Argentina) Vélez Sarsfield	1–0	0–1	5–3 (p)	(Brazil) São Paulo	José Amalfitani	Buenos Aires	Morumbi	São Paulo	–	
1995	(Brazil) Grêmio	3–1	1–1	–	(Colombia) Atlético Nacional	Olímpico	Porto Alegre	Atanasio Girardot	Medellín	–	
1996	(Argentina) River Plate	0–1	2–0	2–1	(Colombia) América de Cali	Pascual Guerrero	Cali	Monumental	Buenos Aires	–	
1997	(Brazil) Cruzeiro	0–0	1–0	–	(Peru) Sporting Cristal	Nacional	Lima	Mineirão	Belo Horizonte	–	
1998	(Brazil) Vasco da Gama	2–0	2–1	–	(Ecuador) Barcelona	São Januário	Rio de Janeiro	Monumental	Guayaquil	–	
1999	(Brazil) Palmeiras	0–1	2–1	4–3 (p)	(Colombia) Deportivo Cali	Pascual Guerrero	Cali	Palestra Itália	São Paulo	–	
2000	(Argentina) Boca Juniors	2–2	0–0	4–2 (p)	(Brazil) Palmeiras	Bombonera	Buenos Aires	Morumbi	São Paulo	–	
2001	(Argentina) Boca Juniors	1–0	0–1	3–1 (p)	(Mexico) Cruz Azul	Azteca	Mexico City	Bombonera	Buenos Aires	–	
2002	(Paraguay) Olimpia	0–1	2–1	4–2 (p)	(Brazil) São Caetano	Defensores del Chaco	Asunción	Pacaembu	São Paulo	–	
2003	(Argentina) Boca Juniors	2–0	3–1	–	(Brazil) Santos	Bombonera	Buenos Aires	Morumbi	São Paulo	–	
2004	(Colombia) Once Caldas	0–0	1–1	2–0 (p)	(Argentina) Boca Juniors	Bombonera	Buenos Aires	Palogrande	Manizales	–	
2005	(Brazil) São Paulo	1–1	4–0	–	(Brazil) Athletico Paranaense	Beira-Rio	Porto Alegre	Morumbi	São Paulo	–	
2006	(Brazil) Internacional	2–1	2–2	–	(Brazil) São Paulo	Morumbi	São Paulo	Beira-Rio	Porto Alegre	–	
2007	(Argentina) Boca Juniors	3–0	2–0	–	(Brazil) Grêmio	Bombonera	Buenos Aires	Olímpico	Porto Alegre	–	
2008	(Ecuador) LDU Quito	4–2	1–3	3–1 (p)	(Brazil) Fluminense	Casa Blanca	Quito	Maracanã	Rio de Janeiro	–	
2009	(Argentina) Estudiantes	0–0	2–1	–	(Brazil) Cruzeiro	Estadio Único	La Plata	Mineirão	Belo Horizonte	–	
2010	(Brazil) Internacional	2–1	3–2	–	(Mexico) Guadalajara	Omnilife	Zapopan	Beira-Rio	Porto Alegre	–	
2011	(Brazil) Santos	0–0	2–1	–	(Uruguay) Peñarol	Centenario	Montevideo	Pacaembu	São Paulo	–	
2012	(Brazil) Corinthians	1–1	2–0	–	(Argentina) Boca Juniors	Bombonera	Buenos Aires	Pacaembu	São Paulo	–	
2013	(Brazil) Atlético Mineiro	0–2	2–0	4–3 (p)	(Paraguay) Olimpia	Defensores del Chaco	Asunción	Mineirão	Belo Horizonte	–	
2014	(Argentina) San Lorenzo	1–1	1–0	–	(Paraguay) Nacional	Defensores del Chaco	Asunción	Pedro Bidegain	Buenos Aires	–	
2015	(Argentina) River Plate	0–0	3–0	–	(Mexico) Tigres UANL	Universitario	San Nicolás de los Garza	Monumental	Buenos Aires	–	
2016	(Colombia) Atlético Nacional	1–1	1–0	–	(Ecuador) Independiente del Valle	Olímpico	Quito	Atanasio Girardot	Medellín	–	
2017	(Brazil) Grêmio	1–0	2–1	–	(Argentina) Lanús	Grêmio	Porto Alegre	Ciudad de Lanús	Lanús	–	
2018	(Argentina) River Plate	2–2	3–1	–	(Argentina) Boca Juniors	Bombonera	Buenos Aires	Santiago Bernabéu	Madrid, Spain	–	
2019	(Brazil) Flamengo	2–1			(Argentina) River Plate	Monumental	Lima	– (Note: Since this edition, the final was played under a single match format.)			
2020	(Brazil) Palmeiras	1–0			(Brazil) Santos	Maracanã	Rio de Janeiro	–			
2021	(Brazil) Palmeiras	2–1			(Brazil) Flamengo	Centenario	Montevideo	–			
2022	(Brazil) Flamengo	1–0			(Brazil) Athletico Paranaense	Monumental	Guayaquil	–			
2023	(Brazil) Fluminense	2–1			(Argentina) Boca Juniors	Maracanã	Rio de Janeiro	–			
2024	(Brazil) Botafogo	3–1			(Brazil) Atlético Mineiro	Monumental	Buenos Aires	–			
2025	(Brazil) Flamengo	1–0			(Brazil) Palmeiras	Monumental	Lima	–			

=== Performances by club ===
Performance in the Copa Libertadores by club
Club	Titles	Runners-up	Seasons won	Seasons runner-up
(Argentina) Independiente	7	0	1964, 1965, 1972, 1973, 1974, 1975, 1984	—
(Argentina) Boca Juniors	6	6	1977, 1978, 2000, 2001, 2003, 2007	1963, 1979, 2004, 2012, 2018, 2023
(Uruguay) Peñarol	5	5	1960, 1961, 1966, 1982, 1987	1962, 1965, 1970, 1983, 2011
(Argentina) River Plate	4	3	1986, 1996, 2015, 2018	1966, 1976, 2019
(Argentina) Estudiantes	4	1	1968, 1969, 1970, 2009	1971
(Brazil) Flamengo	4	1	1981, 2019, 2022, 2025	2021
(Paraguay) Olimpia	3	4	1979, 1990, 2002	1960, 1989, 1991, 2013
(Brazil) Palmeiras	3	4	1999, 2020, 2021	1961, 1968, 2000, 2025
(Uruguay) Nacional	3	3	1971, 1980, 1988	1964, 1967, 1969
(Brazil) São Paulo	3	3	1992, 1993, 2005	1974, 1994, 2006
(Brazil) Santos	3	2	1962, 1963, 2011	2003, 2020
(Brazil) Grêmio	3	2	1983, 1995, 2017	1984, 2007
(Brazil) Cruzeiro	2	2	1976, 1997	1977, 2009
(Brazil) Internacional	2	1	2006, 2010	1980
(Colombia) Atlético Nacional	2	1	1989, 2016	1995
(Chile) Colo-Colo	1	1	1991	1973
(Brazil) Atlético Mineiro	1	1	2013	2024
(Brazil) Fluminense	1	1	2023	2008
(Argentina) Racing	1	0	1967	—
(Argentina) Argentinos Juniors	1	0	1985	—
(Argentina) Vélez Sársfield	1	0	1994	—
(Brazil) Vasco da Gama	1	0	1998	—
(Colombia) Once Caldas	1	0	2004	—
(Ecuador) LDU Quito	1	0	2008	—
(Brazil) Corinthians	1	0	2012	—
(Argentina) San Lorenzo	1	0	2014	—
(Brazil) Botafogo	1	0	2024	—
(Colombia) América de Cali	0	4	—	1985, 1986, 1987, 1996
(Chile) Cobreloa	0	2	—	1981, 1982
(Argentina) Newell's Old Boys	0	2	—	1988, 1992
(Ecuador) Barcelona	0	2	—	1990, 1998
(Colombia) Deportivo Cali	0	2	—	1978, 1999
(Brazil) Athletico Paranaense	0	2	—	2005, 2022
(Peru) Universitario	0	1	—	1972
(Chile) Unión Española	0	1	—	1975
(Chile) Universidad Católica	0	1	—	1993
(Peru) Sporting Cristal	0	1	—	1997
(Mexico) Cruz Azul	0	1	—	2001
(Brazil) São Caetano	0	1	—	2002
(Mexico) Guadalajara	0	1	—	2010
(Paraguay) Nacional	0	1	—	2014
(Mexico) Tigres UANL	0	1	—	2015
(Ecuador) Independiente del Valle	0	1	—	2016
(Argentina) Lanús	0	1	—	2017

=== Performances by country ===
Brazil and Argentina are the most successful nations in the history of the competition with 25 titles each as of 2025. This is followed by Uruguay with 8 titles, Colombia and Paraguay with 3 titles each, and Chile and Ecuador with 1 title each. Peru has no titles but 2 runners-up. Venezuela and Bolivia have never reached a final. Beyond them, Mexico, as an invited country, got 3 runners up but no titles when the country participated from 1998 to 2016.

The stats are updated as of 2026 semi-finals.

Nation	Winners	Runners-up	Total
Brazil	25	21	46
Argentina	25	14	39
Uruguay	8	8	16
Colombia	3	7	10
Paraguay	3	5	8
Chile	1	5	6
Ecuador	1	3	4
Mexico	0	3	3
Peru	0	2	2
Bolivia	0	0	0
Venezuela	0	0	0

== Player records ==
=== Most goals ===
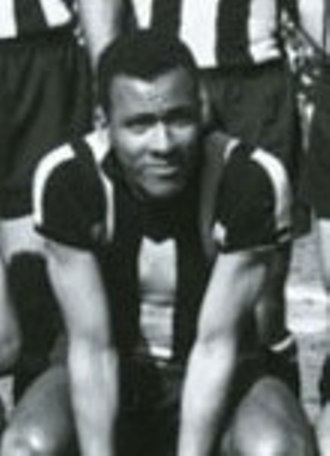
Alberto Spencer scored 54 total goals in the competition, a record that still stands today.

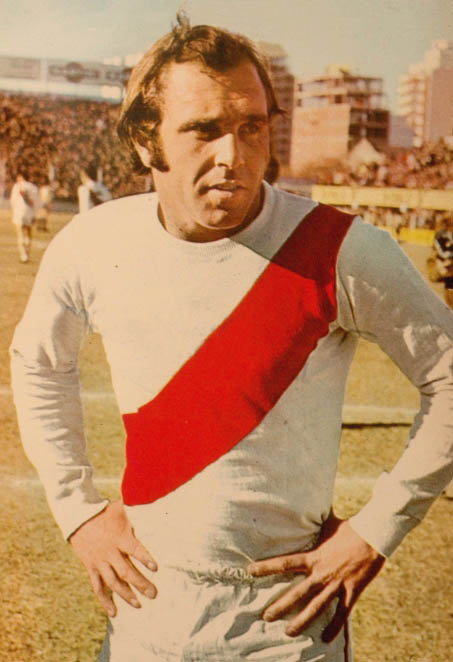
Daniel Onega scored a record 17 goals in a single season during the 1966 tournament.

As of 28 November 2025
Players in bold played in 2025 Copa Libertadores.

Rank	Nation	Player	Goals	Apps	Goal Ratio	Debut	Club(s) (goals)
1	(Ecuador)	Alberto Spencer	54	87	0.62	1960	Peñarol (48); Barcelona (6)
2	(Uruguay)	Fernando Morena	37	77	0.48	1973	Peñarol (37)
3	(Uruguay)	Pedro Virgilio Rocha	36	89	0.40	1962	Peñarol (25); São Paulo (10); Palmeiras (1)
4	(Argentina)	Daniel Onega	31	47	0.66	1966	River Plate (31)
4	(Brazil)	Gabriel Barbosa	31	60	0.52	2018	Santos (1); Flamengo (30)
4	(Colombia)	**Miguel Borja**	31	69	0.45	2015	Atlético Nacional (5); Palmeiras (11); Atlético Junior (7); River Plate (8)
7	(Uruguay)	Julio Morales	30	76	0.39	1966	Nacional (30)
7	(Argentina)	**Lucas Pratto**	30	96	0.31	2011	Universidad Católica (6); Vélez Sarsfield (8); Atlético Mineiro (7); River Plate (9)
9	(Brazil)	Luizão	29	43	0.67	1998	Vasco da Gama (5); Corinthians (15); Grêmio (4); São Paulo (5)
9	(Argentina)	Juan Carlos Sarnari	29	62	0.47	1966	River Plate (10); Universidad Católica (12); Universidad de Chile (4); Santa Fe (3)
9	(Colombia)	Antony de Ávila	29	94	0.31	1983	América de Cali (27); Barcelona (2)

=== Most appearances ===
As of 13 October 2025

Rank	Country	Player	Apps	Goals	From	To	Club(s)
1	(Brazil)	**Fábio**	120	0	2001	present	(Brazil) Vasco da Gama (Brazil) Cruzeiro (Brazil) Fluminense
2	(Paraguay)	Ever Hugo Almeida	113	0	1973	1990	(Paraguay) Olimpia
3	(Argentina)	**Franco Armani**	112	0	2013	present	(Colombia) Atlético Nacional (Argentina) River Plate
4	(Argentina)	Enzo Pérez	110	2	2007	2026	(Argentina) Estudiantes (Argentina) River Plate (Argentina) Argentinos Juniors
5	(Paraguay)	Sergio Aquino	107	9	2006	2020	(Paraguay) Club Libertad
6	(Argentina)	Lucas Pratto	104	30	2011	2026	(Chile) Universidad Católica (Argentina) Vélez Sarsfield (Brazil) Atlético Mineiro (Argentina) River Plate (Chile) Coquimbo Unido
7	(Uruguay)	**Giorgian De Arrascaeta**	102	?	2014	present	(Uruguay) Defensor Sporting (Brazil) Cruzeiro (Brazil) Flamengo
8	(Brazil)	**Weverton**	100	0	2014	present	(Brazil) Athletico Paranaense (Brazil) Palmeiras
9	(Argentina)	**Nacho Fernández**	98	14	2016	present	(Argentina) River Plate (Brazil) Atlético Mineiro
10	(Bolivia)	Vladimir Soria	96	4	1986	2000	(Bolivia) Bolívar
11	(Argentina)	Andrés D'Alessandro	95	13	2001	2017	(Argentina) River Plate (Argentina) San Lorenzo (Brazil) Internacional

== See also ==
- Copa Libertadores Femenina
- Copa Sudamericana
- Continental football championships
- South American Championship of Champions
- Copa Aldao
- Copa Simón Bolívar
