= 1965 Campeonato Uruguayo Primera División =

62nd season of the top-tier football league in Uruguay

Statistics of Primera División Uruguaya for the 1965 season.

== Overview ==
It was contested by 10 teams, and Peñarol won the championship.

== League standings ==
Pos	Team	Pld	W	D	L	GF	GA	GD	Pts
1	Peñarol	18	15	2	1	43	17	+26	32
2	Nacional	18	12	3	3	33	14	+19	27
3	Cerro	18	11	3	4	31	18	+13	25
4	Racing Montevideo	18	8	3	7	27	29	−2	19
5	Fénix	18	7	4	7	22	19	+3	18
6	Rampla Juniors	18	5	7	6	21	22	−1	17
7	Danubio	18	6	5	7	26	27	−1	17
8	Sud América	18	4	3	11	23	34	−11	11
9	Montevideo Wanderers	18	2	3	13	16	36	−20	7
10	Colón	18	2	3	13	14	40	−26	7

Source: rsssf.com
