= Juan López (football manager, born 1908) =

Uruguayan football manager (1908–1983)

Personal information
- Full name: Juan López Fontana
- Date of birth: 15 March 1908
- Place of birth: Montevideo, Uruguay
- Date of death: 4 October 1983 (aged 75)
- Place of death: Montevideo, Uruguay

Managerial career
- Years: Team
- 1946–1955: Uruguay
- 1952–1955: Peñarol
- 1957–1959: Uruguay
- 1959–1960: Ecuador
Medal record
Representing Uruguay (As manager)
FIFA World Cup
Winner	1950 Brazil

Juan López Fontana (15 March 1908 – 4 October 1983) was a Uruguayan professional football manager who won the 1950 FIFA World Cup as the head coach of the Uruguay national team.

== Biography ==
López was born in the Barrio Palermo of Montevideo, Uruguay's capital on 15 March 1908. His hometown is the home of Estadio Centenario where Uruguay had won the 1930 FIFA World Cup under head coach at the time Alberto Suppici. López started out in coaching as a medical assistant at local club Central Fútbol Club, managed by Suppici, who taught López the fundamentals of coaching. López was appointed head coach of Uruguay in 1946.

Uruguay won the 1950 FIFA World Cup in Brazil under López's management. His side beat Bolivia 8–0 in their only first-round game, earning a spot in a four-team final group in the absence of a traditional cup final. Uruguay drew Spain and beat Sweden going into a final match at the Estádio do Maracanã with Brazil, who only needed a draw to win their first World Cup. López's Uruguay came from behind to win the match 2–1, however, sealing their second World Cup win in what has been referred to as the Maracanazo.

At the 1954 FIFA World Cup in Switzerland, López coached his side to a place in the semifinal, beating traditional powerhouses Czechoslovakia, Scotland and England along the way. A 4–2 defeat after extra time to Hungary, the dominant team of the era, set up a third place match with Austria. Uruguay were defeated 3–1 by the Austrians.

By 1962, López was coaching the national side as part of a committee including Hugo Bagnulo and Roberto Scarone, and at the 1962 FIFA World Cup worked alongside Juan Carlos Corazo. At the 1970 FIFA World Cup in Mexico, he worked with head coach Roberto Porta until Uruguay were beaten in the semi-final 3-1 by Brazil.

He also coached Peñarol with whom he won the Uruguayan Primera División in 1953 and 1954. López died on 4 October 1983 in Montevideo at the age of 75.

== Honours ==
=== Manager ===
Peñarol

- Uruguayan Primera División: 1953, 1954

Uruguay

- FIFA World Cup: 1950
