= Óscar Aguirregaray =

Uruguayan footballer (born 1959)

Personal information
- Full name: Óscar Osvaldo Aguirregaray Acosta
- Date of birth: 25 October 1959 (age 67)
- Place of birth: Artigas, Uruguay
- Height: 1.80 m (5 ft 11 in)
- Position: Defender

Senior career*
Years	Team	Apps	(Gls)
1980–1985	Nacional		
1986–1988	Defensor Sporting		
1988–1989	Internacional	41	(2)
1990–1991	Palmeiras	15	(1)
1991	Figueirense		
1991–1993	Defensor Sporting		
1994–2001	Peñarol	28	(2)

International career
1987–1997	Uruguay	10	(0)

Managerial career
- 2006: River Plate Montevideo
Medal record
Representing Uruguay
Copa América
Winner	1987 Argentina
Winner	1995 Uruguay
- * Club domestic league appearances and goals

Óscar Osvaldo Aguirregaray Acosta (born 25 October 1959) is a former Uruguayan footballer who played as a defender for the Uruguay national team.

== Club career ==
At club level, he played for Nacional, Defensor Sporting, Internacional de Porto Alegre, Palmeiras, Figueirense and Peñarol. In 2006, he was head coach of Club Atlético River Plate in Uruguay alongside Pablo Bengoechea.

On 2 May 2001, Oscar Aguirregaray scored Peñarol's only goal in a 1-3 loss to Vasco da Gama in the group stage of the 2001 Copa Libertadores, thus becoming the oldest player to score in the competition at the age of 41 years and 189 days, a record he held for 16 years, until Zé Roberto scored at nearly 43, on 25 May 2017.

== International career ==
Aguirregaray made ten appearances for the Uruguay national football team from 1995 to 1997, having played earlier in 1987 for the Uruguayan Olympic team. He was a member of the Uruguayan squad for the 1987 Copa América but he did not play.

== Honours ==
Nacional

- Copa Libertadores: 1980
- Primera División (Uruguay): 1980, 1983
- Intercontinental Cup: 1980
- Liguilla Pre-Libertadores de América: 1982

Uruguay

- Copa América: 1987 e 1995

Defensor Sporting

- Primera División (Uruguay): 1987, 1991
- Liguilla Pre-Libertadores de América: 1991

Peñarol

- Primera División (Uruguay): 1994, 1995, 1996, 1997 e 1999
- Liguilla Pre-Libertadores de América: 1994 e 1997
