= Ladislao Mazurkiewicz =

Uruguayan footballer (1945–2013)

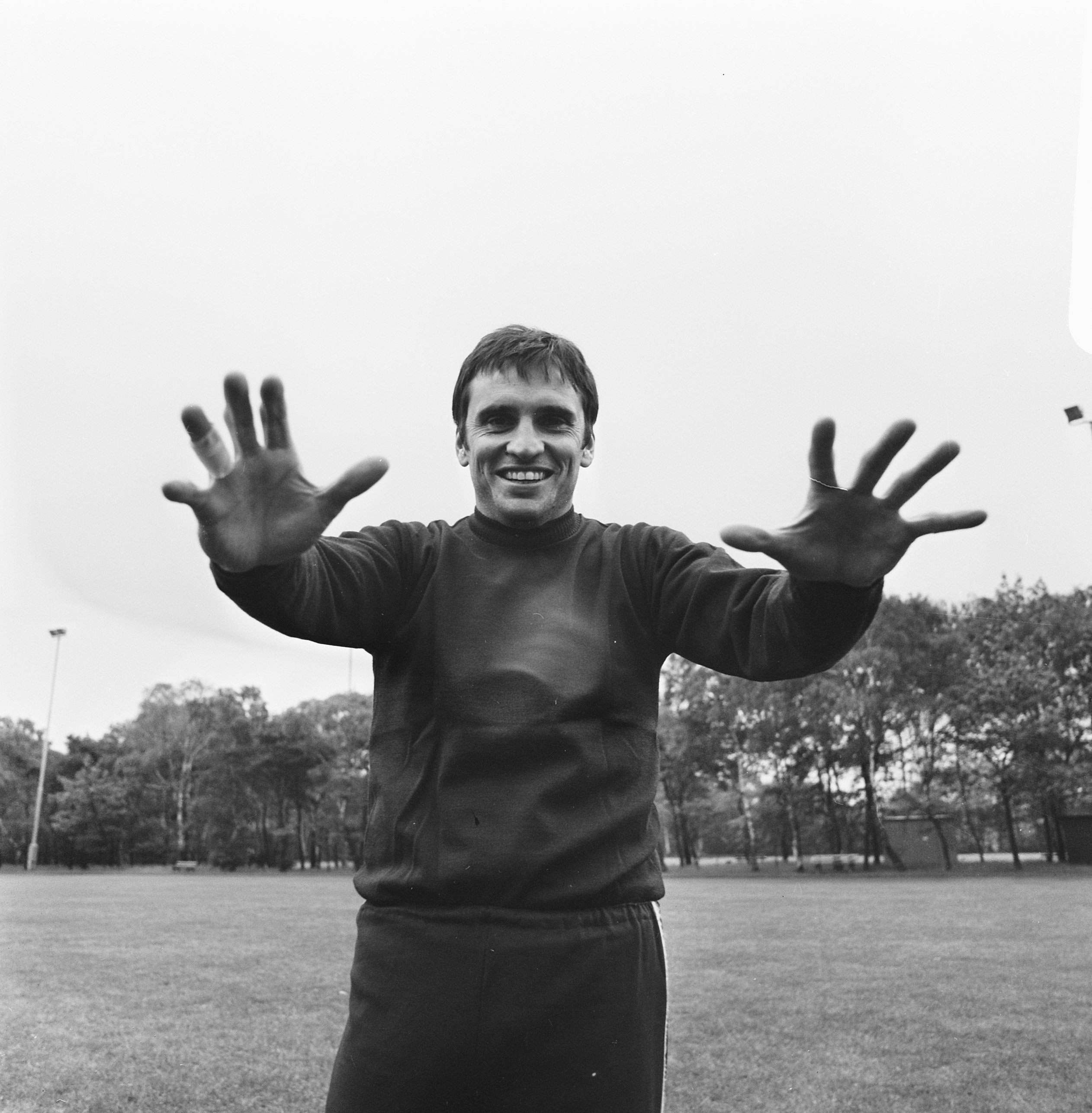
- Mazurkiewicz training for the 1974 FIFA World Cup

Personal information
- Full name: Ladislao Mazurkiewicz Iglesias
- Date of birth: 14 February 1945
- Place of birth: Piriápolis, Uruguay
- Date of death: 2 January 2013 (aged 67)
- Place of death: Montevideo, Uruguay
- Height: 1.78 m (5 ft 10 in)
- Position: Goalkeeper

Senior career*
Years	Team	Apps	(Gls)
1963–1964	RC Montevideo	26	(0)
1965–1971	Peñarol	169	(0)
1971–1974	Atlético Mineiro	44	(0)
1974–1976	Granada	12	(0)
1977–1978	Cobreloa	34	(0)
1979	America de Cali	36	(0)
1981	Peñarol	14	(0)

International career
1965–1974	Uruguay	37	(0)

Managerial career
- 1988–1989: Peñarol
Medal record
Men's football
Representing Uruguay
South American Championship
Winner	1967 Uruguay
- * Club domestic league appearances and goals

Ladislao Mazurkiewicz Iglesias (Latin American Spanish: [laðisˈlao masuɾˈkjeβitʃ]; 14 February 1945 – 2 January 2013) was a Uruguayan footballer who played as a goalkeeper.

== Early life ==
Ladislao Mazurkiewicz Iglesias was born on 14 February 1945 in Piriápolis and was raised in the Reducto neighbourhood of Montevideo. He was the fourth son and fifth child of Terenty Mazurkiewicz, a Polish-born man from Warsaw, and Josefa Iglesias Tubío, a native of Brión, Spain. His father emigrated to Uruguay shortly before the outbreak of World War II and eventually settled in the town of Cardal, in the Florida Department, where he worked as a rural laborer and met and married Iglesias, who had emigrated to Uruguay in the 1920s.

== Career ==
Mazurkiewicz helped the Uruguay national team qualify for the semifinals of the 1970 World Cup, where the charrúas were stopped by the eventual champion, Brazil. He was elected the best goalkeeper of that tournament. He also played for the Brazilian side Atlético Mineiro.

During his international career (1965–74), he earned a total of 37 appearances with the national team of his native Uruguay. He coached Peñarol from 1988 to 1989.

== Death ==
Mazurkiewicz died on 2 January 2013 in Montevideo, Uruguay, aged 67, from undisclosed causes. He is buried at Parque del Recuerdo cemetery.

== Honours ==
Peñarol

- Primera División: 1965, 1966, 1967, 1968, 1981
- Copa Libertadores: 1966
- Intercontinental Cup: 1966
- Intercontinental Champions' Supercup: 1969

Atlético Mineiro

- Série A: 1971

América Cali

- Categoría Primera A: 1979

Uruguay

- South American Championship: 1967

Uruguay U20

- South American U-20 Championship: 1964

Individual

- IFFHS Uruguayan Men's Dream Team
- FIFA World Cup All-Star Team: 1970
