= Peregrino Anselmo =

Uruguayan footballer (1902-1975)

Juan Anselmo
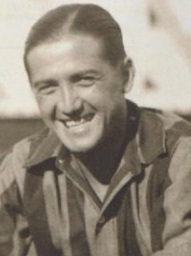

Personal information
- Full name: Juan Peregrino Anselmo
- Date of birth: 30 April 1902
- Place of birth: Montevideo, Uruguay
- Date of death: 27 October 1975 (aged 73)
- Position: Striker

Senior career*
Years	Team	Apps	(Gls)
1922–1935	Peñarol	180	(102)

International career
1927–1935	Uruguay	8	(3)

Managerial career
- 1962: Peñarol
Medal record
Men's football
Representing Uruguay
Olympic Games
Gold medal – first place	1928 Amsterdam	Team
FIFA World Cup
Winner	1930 Uruguay
South American Championship
Winner	1935 Peru
Runner-up	1927 Peru
- * Club domestic league appearances and goals

Juan Peregrino Anselmo (30 April 1902 – 27 October 1975) was a Uruguayan footballer who played as a striker for Uruguay national team. He was a member of national team which won 1930 FIFA World Cup. He scored three goals in the tournament, including two in the semi-finals. He was the first false 9 in a World Cup. He was part of the squad which won gold medal at the 1928 Summer Olympics, but did not play in any games. He was a player and later coach of C.A. Peñarol. As coach, succeeding mid-1962 the Hungarian Béla Guttmann in office, he led the club to the Uruguayan championship of the same year. In the later part of 1963 the Uruguayan goalkeeper Roque Máspoli succeeded him.

== International goals ==
Scores and results list Uruguay's goal tally first, score column indicates score after each Anselmo goal.

List of international goals scored by Peregrino Anselmo
#	Date	Venue	Opponent	Score	Result	Competition
1.	21 July 1930	Estadio Centenario, Montevideo, Uruguay	Romania	3–0	4–0	1930 FIFA World Cup
2.	27 July 1930	Estadio Centenario, Montevideo, Uruguay	Yugoslavia	2–1	6–1	1930 FIFA World Cup
3.	27 July 1930	Estadio Centenario, Montevideo, Uruguay	Yugoslavia	3–1	6–1	1930 FIFA World Cup

== Honours ==
Peñarol

- Primera División (AUF): 1928, 1929, 1932, 1935
- Primera División (FUF/CP): 1924 FUF, 1926 CP

Uruguay

- FIFA World Cup: 1930
- South American Championship: 1935
- Summer Olympics: 1928
