= Hugo Bagnulo =

Uruguayan footballer and manager (1915–2008)

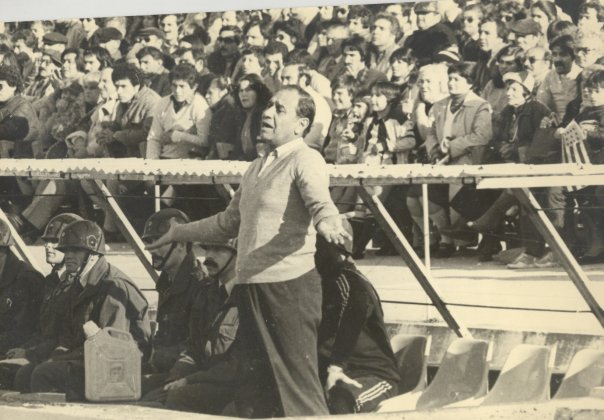
- Bagnulo in 1982

Personal information
- Full name: Víctor Hugo Bagnulo Fernández
- Date of birth: 23 July 1915
- Place of birth: Montevideo, Uruguay
- Date of death: 7 February 2008 (aged 92)
- Place of death: Montevideo, Uruguay
- Position: Defender

Senior career*
Years	Team	Apps	(Gls)
1935–1938	Central Español		
1939–1946	Defensor		
1947	Danubio		

International career
1942	Uruguay	1	(0)

Managerial career
- 1948–1952: Danubio
- 1952–1957: Defensor
- 1955–1957: Uruguay
- 1958–1959: Peñarol
- 1960–1961: Defensor
- 1962: Nacional
- 1962: Uruguay
- 1963–1964: Rampla Juniors
- 1965: Rosario Central
- 1966: Montevideo Wanderers
- 1967: Rampla Juniors
- 1968: Central Español
- 1969–1970: Alianza Lima
- 1971: Bella Vista
- 1972: Huracán Buceo
- 1973–1974: Peñarol
- 1974–1975: Peñarol
- 1976: Liverpool Montevideo
- 1978: Uruguay
- 1982–1983: Peñarol
- * Club domestic league appearances and goals

Víctor Hugo Bagnulo Fernández (23 July 1915 – 7 February 2008) was a Uruguayan football player and manager. He is most famous for his managing success at Uruguayan giants Peñarol, with whom he won five national league titles.

== Career ==
Bagnulo's playing career spanned 12 years from 1935 to 1947, during which he played as a defender for Uruguayan sides Central Español, Defensor and Danubio. His first coaching experience came on Defensor's tour in Chile in 1946, where he led the club to a 6–0 victory in a friendly against Chilean club Colo-Colo.

He was also capped once for Uruguay, appearing in a Copa Newton 4–1 defeat to Argentina on 25 May 1942.

In 1947, he joined Danubio, where he was at the same time a player and youth coach. After retiring from playing a year later, he took the job of the club's manager. In 1952 he left the club to take over Defensor, and three years later, in 1955, he was appointed manager of Uruguay. With Uruguay he won the 1956 Copa América before being replaced by Juan López Fontana in 1957.

In 1958 he had his first coaching spell at Peñarol, with whom he won two league titles in 1958 and 1959 and which continued to dominate South American football in the following few years under the guidance of his successor Roberto Scarone. After leaving Peñarol, he had a number of coaching spells at local sides Defensor, Nacional, Rampla Juniors, Montevideo Wanderers, Central Español and Huracán Buceo, as well as abroad (at Rosario Central in Argentina and Alianza Lima in Peru).

At the 1962 FIFA World Cup Bagnulo was also assistant to the Uruguay national team manager Juan Carlos Corazzo, along with Juan López Fontana and Roberto Scarone.

Between 1970 and 1973 he had his second spell with Uruguay with whom he qualified for the 1974 FIFA World Cup, but was nevertheless replaced by Roberto Porta before the tournament took place. He then returned to Peñarol in 1973 and won three Uruguayan league titles in a row (1973, 1974 and 1975), as well as the Teresa Herrera Trophy in 1974 and 1975. After a spell at Liverpool de Montevideo in 1976, he again took over as Uruguay manager in 1978 and led them in a handful of games.

His last coaching job was back at Peñarol, whom he took over in 1982 and led through a historic season in which they won the national championship, the Copa Libertadores (beating Chilean side Cobreloa in the final) and the Intercontinental Cup (beating reigning European champions Aston Villa).

== Honours ==
Peñarol

- Uruguayan League: 1958, 1973, 1974, 1975, 1982
- Copa Libertadores: 1982
- Intercontinental Cup: 1982

Uruguay

- Copa América: 1956
