= Aguirregaray =

Aguirregaray is a surname. Notable people with the surname include:

- Matías Aguirregaray (born 1989), Uruguayan footballer, son of Óscar
- Óscar Aguirregaray (born 1959), Uruguayan footballer and manager
