= Roberto Scarone =

Uruguayan footballer and manager (1917–1994)

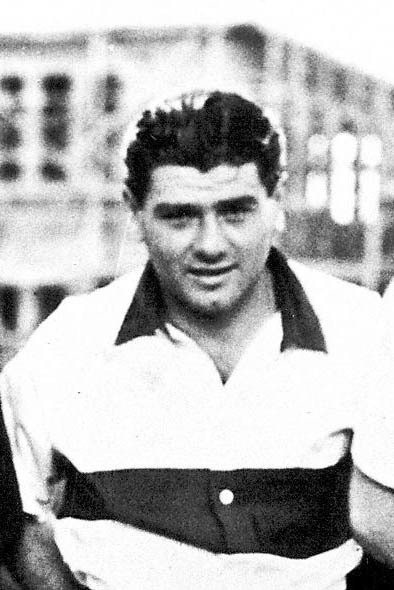
- Scarone with Gimnasia y Esgrima LP in 1948

Personal information
- Full name: Roberto Scarone Rivera
- Date of birth: 16 July 1917
- Place of birth: Montevideo, Uruguay
- Date of death: 25 April 1994 (aged 76)
- Place of death: Montevideo, Uruguay
- Position: Right back

Senior career*
Years	Team	Apps	(Gls)
–1939	Peñarol		
1939–1943	Gimnasia La Plata		
1943–1945	América		
1945–1947	Atlante		
1948	Gimnasia y Esgrima LP		

Managerial career
- 1948–1951: Gimnasia y Esgrima LP
- 1952–1953: Deportivo Cali
- 1953–1955: Centro Iqueño
- 1956: Audax Italiano
- 1957: Centro Iqueño
- 1958–1959: Alianza Lima
- 1959–1962: Peñarol
- 1962: Uruguay
- 1963–1964: Monterrey
- 1965–1966: América
- 1966–1967: Nacional
- 1968: Monterrey
- 1969–1974: Universitario
- 1972–1973: Peru
- 1975: San Lorenzo
- 1977: Ñublense
- 1979: Juan Aurich
- 1982: Universitario
- * Club domestic league appearances and goals

Roberto Scarone Rivera (16 July 1917 – 25 April 1994) was a Uruguayan football player and manager. He is mainly known for his successful managing spell at the helm of the Uruguayan powerhouse Peñarol in the early 1960s.

== Career ==
Scarone started playing professionally at his hometown club Peñarol in the 1930s. In 1939, at the age of 22, he moved to Gimnasia y Esgrima La Plata in Argentina where he spent four seasons. Between 1943 and 1947 he had spells with Mexican sides América and Atlante before coming back to Gimnasia in 1948. That same year he retired from active football and immediately took over as the club's coach.

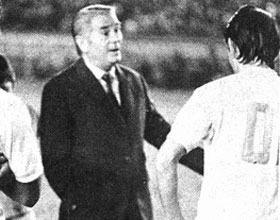
Scarone as Manager of Universitario de Deportes in 1972

His then spent the following three decades coaching a number of South American clubs in Argentina, Colombia, Chile, Peru, and Mexico. His greatest successes came in the early 1960s with Peñarol with whom he won three consecutive Uruguayan championships in 1959, 1960 and 1961, two Copa Libertadores titles (in 1960 and 1961) and the 1961 Intercontinental Cup. On account of his success with Peñarol he was made a member of the Uruguay national football team coaching staff in the 1962 FIFA World Cup, along with Juan Carlos Corazzo, Juan López Fontana and Hugo Bagnulo.

He also had considerable success coaching in Peru, winning four Peruvian championships with Centro Iqueño and Universitario de Deportes, and even took Universitario to the finals of the 1972 Copa Libertadores. In addition, he won the 1965–66 Mexican championship with Club América. He also had a brief stint managing Peru national football team in the 1974 FIFA World Cup qualifying campaign.

Scarone retired from coaching in 1982. After suffering from Alzheimer's disease in his later years, Scarone died on 25 April 1994 in his hometown of Montevideo.

== Honours ==
National

- 4 × Peruvian League: 1957 (with Centro Iqueño) and 1969, 1971 and 1982 (with Universitario)
- 4 × Uruguayan League: 1959, 1960, 1961 (with Peñarol) and 1966 (with Nacional)
- 1 × Mexican League: 1965–66 (with América)

International

- 2 × Copa Libertadores: 1960, 1961 (with Peñarol)
- 1 × Intercontinental Cup: 1961 (with Peñarol)
