= Randolph Galloway =

English footballer (1896–1964)

Personal information
- Full name: Randolph Septimus Galloway
- Date of birth: 22 December 1896
- Place of birth: Sunderland, England
- Date of death: 10 April 1964 (aged 67)
- Place of death: Mapperley, England
- Height: 5 ft 10 in (1.78 m)
- Position: Striker

Senior career*
Years	Team	Apps	(Gls)
- Sunderland Tramways
1922–1924	Derby County	66	(25)
1924–1927	Nottingham Forest	39	(8)
1927	Luton Town	2	(1)
1927–1928	Coventry City	4	(1)
1928–1929	Tottenham Hotspur	3	(2)
- Grantham Town

Managerial career
- 1929–1931: Sporting de Gijón
- 1931–1933: Valencia CF
- 1933–1935: Racing Santander
- 1946: Costa Rica
- 1948: C.A. Peñarol
- 1949–1950: Young Fellows Zürich
- 1950–1953: Sporting CP
- 1954–1955: Vitória S.C.
- * Club domestic league appearances and goals

Randolph Galloway (22 December 1896 – 10 April 1964) was an English footballer and football manager. He played for Sunderland Tramways, Derby County, Nottingham Forest, Luton Town, Coventry City, Tottenham Hotspur and Grantham Town.

Galloway scored on his 'Lilywhites' debut in a 1–1 draw with Southampton at The Dell in September 1928 in the old Second Division.

== Management ==
Galloway coached Sporting de Gijón, Valencia CF, Racing de Santander, Peñarol, Young Fellows Zürich, Sporting CP and Vitória S.C.
