= Juan Ricardo Faccio =

Uruguayan footballer and manager (1936–2024)

Personal information
- Full name: Juan Ricardo Faccio Porta
- Date of birth: 8 December 1936
- Place of birth: Montevideo, Uruguay
- Date of death: 15 July 2024 (aged 87)
- Position: Defender

Senior career*
Years	Team	Apps	(Gls)
- Nacional
- → Fenix (loan)
- River Plate de Montevideo
- Liverpool de Montevideo

Managerial career
- 1972–1973: Peñarol
- River Plate Montevideo
- 1977: El Salvador
- 1977–1978: Puebla
- 1978–1982: Coyotes Neza
- 1982: León
- 1983: Independiente Santa Fe
- 1986–1987: Cobras de Ciudad Juárez
- * Club domestic league appearances and goals

Juan Ricardo Faccio Porta (8 December 1936 – 15 July 2024) was a Uruguayan football player and manager.

== Career ==
Born in the Jacinto Vera neighborhood of Montevideo, Faccio began playing football as a defender with Club Nacional de Football in the late 1950s. He went on loan to C.A. Fenix and returned to Nacional. Faccio also played for River Plate de Montevideo and Liverpool de Montevideo.

After he retired from playing, Faccio became a football manager and later a sports journalist. He managed local side C.A. Peñarol before moving abroad to manage the El Salvador national team in 1977 followed by several clubs in Mexico and Colombia. While in Mexico, Faccio managed Coyotes Neza from 1978 to 1982, leading the club for 157 Mexican Primera División matches.

== Arrest and imprisonment ==
In June 2006, Faccio was arrested following a shooting incident outside his home. A 39-year-old man had an altercation with Faccio's daughter earlier in the day, and Faccio shot him in the knee, resulting in the man being taken to the hospital for surgery. Faccio was convicted of causing serious injury aggravated by the use of a weapon and spent three months in prison.

== Personal life and death ==
Faccio's father, Ricardo Faccio, and two of his uncles, Abdón Porte and Roberto Porta, were Uruguayan international footballers.

Faccio died on 15 July 2024, at the age of 87.
