= José Pedro Damiani =

Uruguayan politician and accountant

Personal details
- Born: October 10, 1921 Montevideo, Uruguay
- Died: August 25, 2007, aged 85 Montevideo, Uruguay
- Party: Colorado Party
- Spouse: Gladys Sobrero (-2010)
- Children: Verónica, Magela, Patricia, Gabriela, Juan Pedro
- Education: Universidad de la República
- Occupation: Politician, accountant

José Pedro Damiani (October 10, 1921 – August 25, 2007) was an Uruguayan politician and accountant. He was the Uruguayan president of the "Club Atlético Peñarol".
