= Gregorio Pérez =

Uruguayan footballer and manager (born 1948)

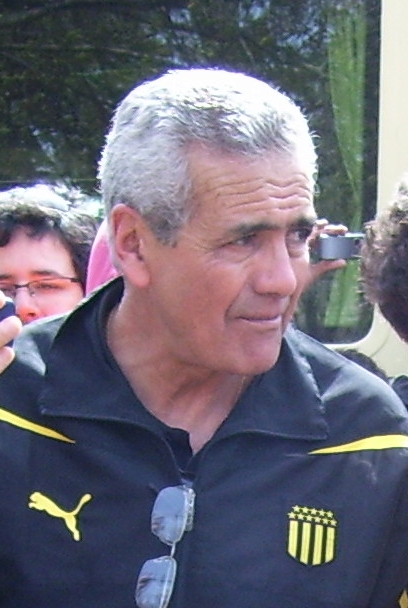
- Pérez in 2011

Personal information
- Full name: Gregorio Elso Pérez Perdigón
- Date of birth: 16 January 1948 (age 78)
- Place of birth: Estación la Sierra, Uruguay
- Position: Midfielder

Senior career*
Years	Team	Apps	(Gls)
1976–1979	Defensor Sporting		

Managerial career
- 1981: Progreso
- 1982: Basáñez
- 1983–1984: Defensor Sporting
- 1985: Rampla Juniors
- 1986: Central Español
- 1987: Montevideo Wanderers
- 1988: Uruguay U20
- 1988–1990: Uruguay (assistant)
- 1991–1992: Gimnasia La Plata
- 1993–1995: Peñarol
- 1996: Independiente
- 1996: Cagliari
- 1997–1998: Peñarol
- 1999–2000: Gimnasia La Plata
- 2001–2002: Peñarol
- 2003: Danubio
- 2004–2005: Olimpo
- 2005: Argentinos Juniors
- 2006–2007: Peñarol
- 2009: Olimpia
- 2010–2011: Libertad
- 2011–2012: Peñarol
- 2012: Olimpia
- 2016: Rubio Ñu
- 2017: Deportes Tolima
- 2017–2018: Santa Fe
- 2020: Universitario
- 2020: Defensor Sporting
- 2021: Universitario
- * Club domestic league appearances and goals

Gregorio Elso Pérez Perdigón (born 16 January 1948 in Maldonado) is a Uruguayan football manager and former player who played as a midfielder.

Pérez is widely reputed in his country for his respectful approach toward the game and general sportsmanship. He is known as "Don Gregorio".

== Managerial career ==
Gregorio Pérez acted as an assistant manager to Oscar Tabarez during the Uruguayan national football team's 1990 Football World Cup campaign. Pérez acted as a coach for Club Universitario de Deportes in 2020-2021, before retiring due to heart problems in 2024.
