= 1964 Campeonato Uruguayo Primera División =

61st season of the top-tier football league in Uruguay

Statistics of Primera División Uruguaya for the 1964 season.

== Overview ==
It was contested by 10 teams, and Peñarol won the championship.

== League standings ==
Pos	Team	Pld	W	D	L	GF	GA	GD	Pts
1	Peñarol	18	16	2	0	42	11	+31	34
2	Rampla Juniors	18	9	4	5	35	24	+11	22
3	Nacional	18	9	3	6	29	20	+9	21
4	Montevideo Wanderers	18	7	7	4	26	22	+4	21
5	Cerro	18	7	5	6	22	20	+2	19
6	Sud América	18	7	4	7	25	27	−2	18
7	Danubio	18	4	5	9	25	39	−14	13
8	Defensor	18	3	6	9	16	26	−10	12
9	Racing Montevideo	18	3	4	11	16	30	−14	10
10	Fénix	18	3	4	11	18	35	−17	10

Source: rsssf.com
