= 1968 Campeonato Uruguayo Primera División =

65th season of the top-tier football league in Uruguay

Statistics of Primera División Uruguaya for the 1968 season.

== Overview ==
It was contested by 10 teams, and Peñarol won the championship.

== League standings ==
Pos	Team	Pld	W	D	L	GF	GA	GD	Pts
1	Peñarol	18	15	3	0	29	5	+24	33
2	Nacional	18	11	5	2	29	7	+22	27
3	Cerro	18	9	3	6	25	14	+11	21
4	Defensor	18	5	8	5	15	15	0	18
5	Rampla Juniors	18	6	5	7	16	20	−4	17
6	Sud América	18	6	4	8	19	24	−5	16
7	River Plate	18	4	7	7	18	25	−7	15
8	Liverpool	18	5	4	9	15	22	−7	14
9	Racing Montevideo	18	3	4	11	11	24	−13	10
10	Danubio	18	2	5	11	8	29	−21	9

Source: rsssf.com
