= 1967 Campeonato Uruguayo Primera División =

64th season of the top-tier football league in Uruguay

Statistics of Primera División Uruguaya for the 1967 season.

== Overview ==
It was contested by 10 teams, and Peñarol won the championship.

== League standings ==
Pos	Team	Pld	W	D	L	GF	GA	GD	Pts
1	Peñarol	18	15	3	0	43	6	+37	33
2	Nacional	18	11	5	2	26	16	+10	27
3	Cerro	18	7	6	5	21	16	+5	20
4	Racing Montevideo	18	3	12	3	13	17	−4	18
5	Rampla Juniors	18	6	5	7	21	22	−1	17
6	Danubio	18	5	6	7	18	19	−1	16
7	Defensor	18	5	4	9	19	27	−8	14
8	Liverpool	18	3	7	8	14	23	−9	13
9	Fénix	18	3	5	10	15	29	−14	11
10	Sud América	18	3	5	10	15	30	−15	11

Source: rsssf.com
