= Peñarol =

Association football club in Uruguay

- Full name: Club Atlético Peñarol
- Nicknames: Aurinegros (Yellow-and-Blacks); Carboneros (The Coalworkers); Decano (The Dean); Manyas (Supporters); Mirasoles (The Sunflowers); Peñarolenses (Supporters)
- Short name: CAP • PEÑ
- Founded: 28 September 1891; 135 years ago (as the Central Uruguay Railway Cricket Club)
- Ground: Estadio Campeón del Siglo
- Capacity: 40,000
- Coordinates: 34°47′49″S 56°04′02″W
- President: Juan Ignacio Ruglio
- Vice-president: Eduardo Zaidensztat
- Manager: Diego Aguirre
- League: Liga AUF Uruguaya
- 2025: Liga AUF Uruguaya, 2nd of 16
- Website: peñarol.org
Home colours	Away colours	Third colours

Club Atlético Peñarol (Spanish pronunciation: [kluβ aˈtletiko peɲaˈɾol]; more commonly referred to as Peñarol), is a Uruguayan professional sports club based in Montevideo. They are most known for their men's professional football team, currently competing in the Uruguayan Primera División, the highest tier of the Uruguayan football league system. Regarded as one of the most accomplished football clubs in the history of the sport, Peñarol has won 108 officially recognized titles throughout its history, comprising four intercontinental, (Note: 1. 1961 Intercontinental Cup: Peñarol (5–1; Playoff: 2–1) Benfica; 2. 1966 Intercontinental Cup: Peñarol (4–0) Real Madrid; 3. 1969 Intercontinental Supercup: Peñarol (9 points), Racing Club de Avellaneda (8 points), Estudiantes de La Plata (3 points), Santos (2 points); 4. 1982 Intercontinental Cup: Peñarol (4–0) Aston Villa) five continental, (Note: 1. 1960 Copa Libertadores: Peñarol (2–1) Club Olimpia; 2. 1961 Copa Libertadores: Peñarol (2–1) Palmeiras; 3. 1966 Copa Libertadores: Peñarol (3–3, Playoff: 4–2) River Plate; 4. 1982 Copa Libertadores: Peñarol (1–0) Cobreloa; 5. 1987 Copa Libertadores: Peñarol (2–2, Playoff: 1–0) América de Cali) and ninety-nine domestic championships. (Note: Peñarol has won the Uruguayan Primera División 43 times in its era, and when the championships won by its predecessor are taken into account, its historical tally rises to 52 titles overall. In addition, Peñarol has won 47 other domestic honours in its history, including tournaments in collaboration with the Argentine and Uruguayan football associations.) In September 2009, Peñarol was recognized as the best South American club of the 20th century by the IFFHS. In addition to football, Peñarol has maintained a presence across a diverse range of sporting disciplines in their history. (Note: These primarily include athletics, basketball, cycling, futsal, rugby union, and women's football.) Since 2016, Peñarol has hosted its home fixtures at the Estadio Campeón del Siglo, which succeeded the Estadio Centenario, the club's principal home venue from 1933 onward. The club currently has approximately 80,000 associates.

The club's origin dates back to 1891, when the club was initially established as the Central Uruguay Railway Cricket Club (also known by its acronym CURCC) by predominantly British railway workers employed by the Central Uruguay Railway for the practice of cricket, with Frank Henderson appointed as the inaugural president; the club was renamed as Peñarol in 1913. (Note: Due to where the CURCC's facilities were located at that time and in part to the complexity of the institution's name, the club was also simultaneously known as Peñarol; the club was officially renamed to Peñarol on 13 December 1913. However, the continuity between the football section of the CURCC and Peñarol has long been a subject of considerable controversy within Uruguayan football historiography. Some football scholars and commentators contend that, although Peñarol inherited the CURCC’s sporting tradition and there exists a clear sociological continuity between the two, they were, in legal and institutional terms, distinct entities. According to this interpretation, the CURCC remained in existence until its formal dissolution on 22 January 1915, albeit by that stage functioning primarily as a recreational organization for employees of the railway company. Nevertheless, the Uruguayan Football Association has recognized Peñarol as the institutional continuation of the CURCC since 1914.) Its name comes from the barrio (neighborhood) on the outskirts of Montevideo, which itself takes its name from Pinerolo, a comune (municipality) in the metropolitan city of Turin, in the Italian region of Piedmont. Although the original uniform colors of the CURCC were black and orange, Peñarol has consistently identified with yellow and black throughout its history, inspired by the Stephenson's Rocket and the railway workers' union.

By the early 20th century, Peñarol began to establish itself as a prominent club in both Uruguayan and international football following the national team's victories at the 1930 and 1950 FIFA World Cups, campaigns in which Peñarol was represented by a number of players, including several products developed through the club’s own system. The club found their most prominent success starting in the 1960s, capturing most of their historical major titles across the following two decades while being shaped by a succession of exceptional talents. (Note: Prominent footballers of this period include Diego Aguirre, Néstor Gonçalves, Fernando Morena, Juan Alberto Schiaffino, Ladislao Mazurkiewicz, and Alberto Spencer.) By the 1990s, however, Peñarol entered a period of relative decline, with its success in domestic and international competitions becoming less frequent than in previous decades. Since the 2010s, the club has experienced a renewed resurgence on the international stage, reasserting its presence in continental competition. The club has never been relegated and has many long-standing rivalries, most notably with Club Nacional de Football, known as the Uruguayan Clásico. The derby is considered one of the oldest in international football, with their first meeting in 1900 with a 2–0 Peñarol victory; they have faced each other on more than 500 occasions. As of 2026, Peñarol currently holds the advantage in the head-to-head record.

== History ==
=== Origins ===
On 28 September 1891, employees of the Central Uruguay Railway Company established the Central Uruguay Railway Cricket Club (CURCC) of Montevideo, with the purpose of stimulating the practice of cricket, rugby football and "other male sports" (literal from the Spanish).

The Central Uruguay Railway company had operated in Uruguay since 1878, with 118 employees, 72 British, 45 Uruguayan and one German. The club was known as CURCC in the neighborhood of Peñarol—the latter from the Peñarol neighborhood, about 10 kilometres (6.2 mi) from Montevideo, whose name in turn derived from an Italian city. The club's first president was Frank Henderson, who remained in that position until 1899.

In 1892, the CURCC shifted its focus from cricket and rugby to association football. The football club's first game was against a team of students from the English high school and ended with a 2–0 victory. In 1895, Uruguayan footballer Julio Negrón was chosen as the team's first non-British captain.

=== First titles ===
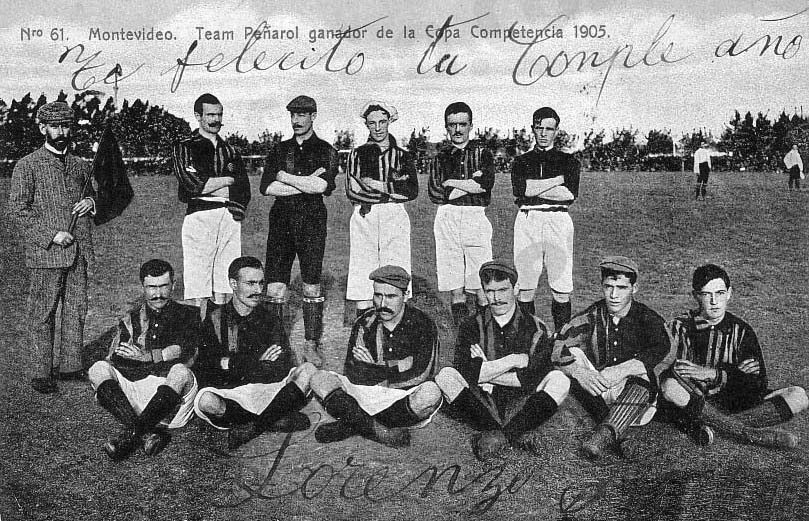
The 1905 CURCC team

In 1900 the CURCC was one of four charter members of the Uruguay Association Football League, making its debut in official competition on 10 June against Albion and winning 2–1. The club won its first Uruguayan championship that year, repeating in 1901, 1905 and 1907. In 1906 Charles W. Bayne took over the railroad, and refused to sponsor the football team due to financial and work issues. Conflict between the company and the football club led to the severance of their relationship in 1913.

In 1908, the club left the Uruguayan league after the league rejected their request to replay a game with F.C. Dublín. CURCC had lost 2–3 on the road, and believed their poor showing was due to refereeing mistakes caused by pressure from rabid home fans. As a sign of good faith, Nacional also retired from the league, since both teams agreed that "Los Partidos se ganan en la Cancha", or "matches are won on the pitch". Back in competition the following year, relations between the CUR and the club became frostier after fans burned a train car used for rival teams.

A year after the club's 1911 Uruguayan championship, the club attempted reforms to its policies. Proposals included greater participation by non-CUR players and a name change to "CURCC Peñarol". In June 1913, the proposals were rejected; the company wanted to distance itself from the club's local reputation. The railroad company, decided to separate the "foot-ball" section of the team from the company on Saturday 13 December 1913. That is when Peñarol was founded. The following day it was the first time a "Clasico" was officially played between Nacional and Peñarol.

CURCC kept playing football in the amateurism until it was dissolved on 22 January 1915 and donated all their trophies to the British Hospital of Montevideo, not to Peñarol.

Peñarol documents

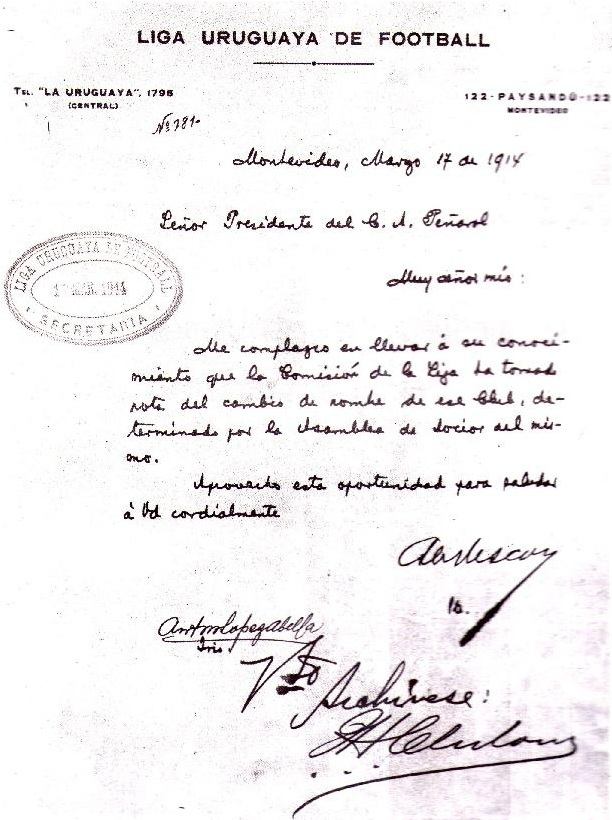
1914 letter from the Uruguayan League, approving the club's name change

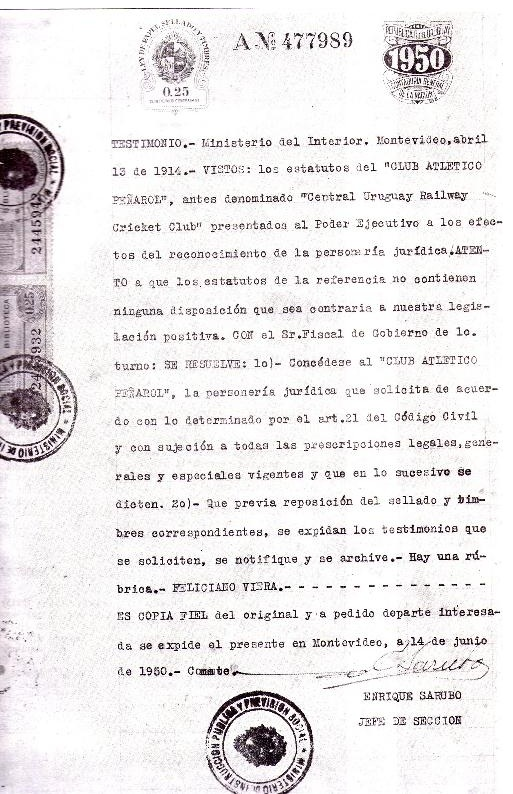
Uruguayan document acknowledging Peñarol as successor of the CURCC

=== C.A. Peñarol ===
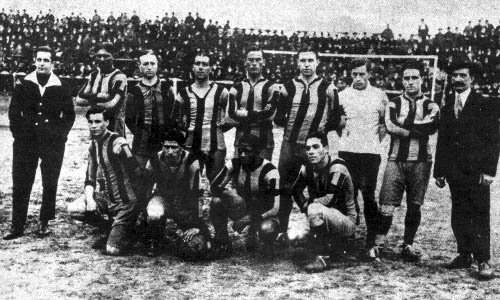
In 1918, the club won its first domestic title under the name "Club Atlético Peñarol"

On 12 March 1914, Peñarol replaced CURCC's spot in the Uruguayan Football League after its foundation in 1913. A request submitted to the Uruguayan Football League two days later and approved the following day. During its first years Peñarol was not successful, although a new stadium (Las Acacias) opened on 19 May 1916. The club won its first two league titles in 1918 and 1920.

In November 1922 the Asociación Uruguaya de Fútbol (AUF) disqualified Peñarol because the club played an exhibition game with Racing, an Argentine club affiliated with Asociación Amateurs de Football (a dissident association established in 1919 that rivalized with the official entity, AFA). Peñarol and other clubs then organised a new league, the Uruguayan Football Federation (FUF), and the club won the 1924 championship. The league was short-lived; Peñarol won the 1926 Copa del Consejo Provisorio, triggering a merger between the AUF and the FUF.

=== First European tour ===
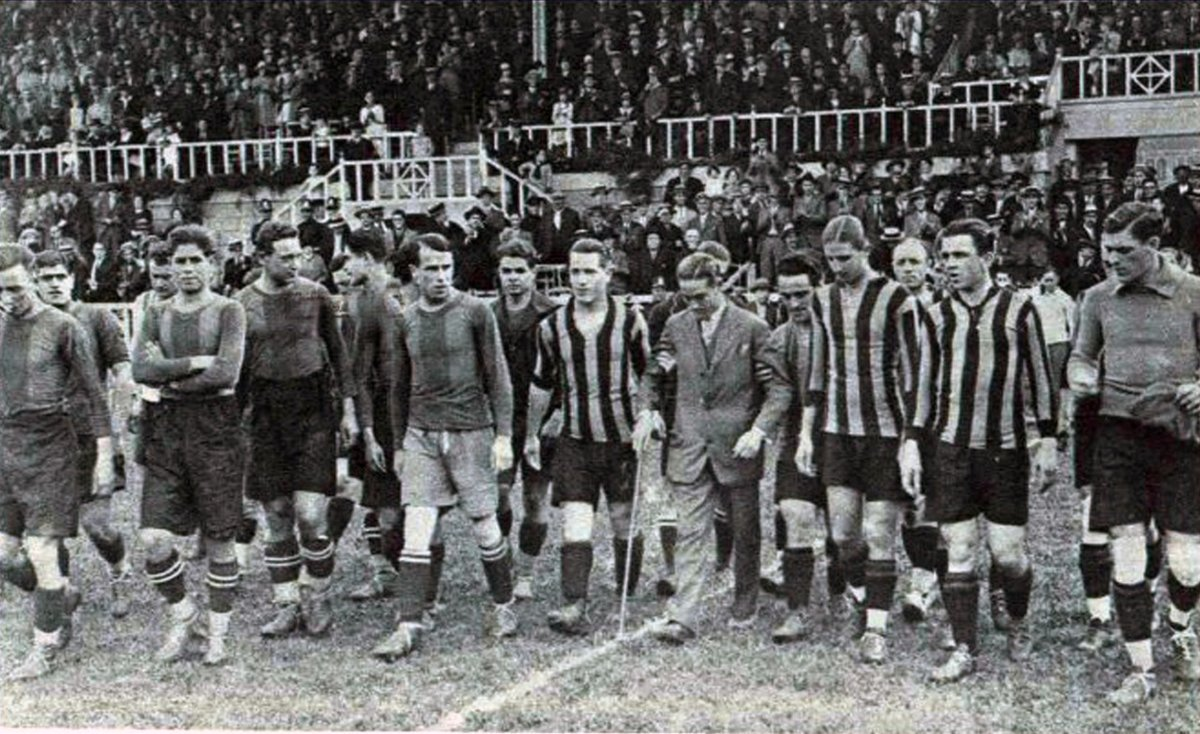
Players of Barcelona and Peñarol entering the pitch before their first test, 5 June 1927

In 1927, Peñarol made its first tour to Europe, playing a total of 19 matches against teams from Germany, Switzerland, Austria, Spain, Czechoslovakia and France. The tour extended from April to June. The first match of the tour was vs. the Vienna combined, which Peñarol lost by 3–1. The Uruguayan team then played Bayern Munich (1–2), SpVgg (1–2), Hertha BSC (Berlin) (0–1). The first win was v. Eintracht Frankfurt (3–1). The lineup for that match was Luis Biscardi, Demis D’Agosto, José Benincasa, Pascual Ruotta, Gildeón Silva, Antonio Aguerre, Ladislao Pérez, Antonio Sacco, Pablo Terevinto, Peregrín Anselmo, Antonio Campolo. Goals were scored by Suffiotti (2) and Ruotta. The tour continued in Switzerland, v. Young Fellows (1–0), Rapid Vienna (0–5), then facing Sparta Prague (losing by 1–0).

On 5 June, Peñarol played its first game in Spain v. FC Barcelona, losing by 1–5. The second test was played one day later, finishing in a tie (1–1). Other notable games of the tour were the two tests v. Atlético Madrid (5–2 and 4–3).

Peñarol played a total of 19 matches in 80 days (6 in Spain, 5 in Germany, 4 in Switzerland and 1 in Czechoslovakia and France), totalizing 7 wins, 4 draws and 8 losses. The team scored 32 goals and received 33, with Antonio Sacco being the topscorer with 9 goals.

After its first European tour in 1927, Peñarol won the Uruguayan championship in 1928 and 1929; the following year, the club defeated Olimpia 1–0 in its first game at the Centenario Stadium in Montevideo.

=== Consolidation ===
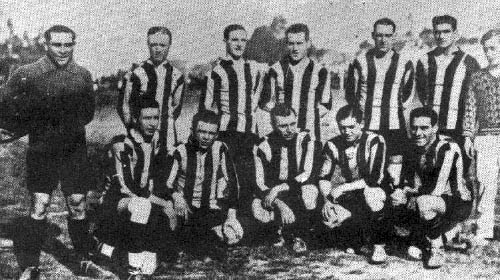
The 1928 Peñarol team, Primera División champions

In 1932, Peñarol and River Plate played the first game of the professional era. Peñarol won the first Uruguayan professional championship with 40 points, five more than runners-up Rampla Juniors. After placing second in 1933 and 1934, the club won four consecutive league tournaments between 1935 and 1938; they also won the 1936 Torneo Competencia.

The club stayed in second place until 1944, when Peñarol again won the Uruguayan Championship (defeating Nacional in a two-game final, 0–0 and 3–2). In 1945 the club retained the title, with Nicolás Falero and Raúl Schiaffino the top goal scorers of the playoffs with 21 apiece. Peñarol was again victorious in 1949, four points ahead of runner-up Nacional with Óscar Míguez the top scorer.

After placing second in 1950, Peñarol won the Uruguayan Championship the following year; this was also the start of the Palacio Peñarol's four-year construction. During the 1950s, the club also won national championships in 1953, 1954, 1958 and 1959.

=== International success ===
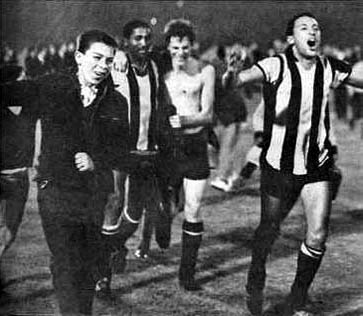
Peñarol celebrating the 1966 Copa Libertadores, the third for the club after beating Argentine club River Plate by 4–2

Their 1959 championship qualified Peñarol for the recently created Copa Libertadores, an international competition then known as the Copa de Campeones de América. Peñarol won the first two tournaments, beating Olimpia of Paraguay in 1960 and Palmeiras of Brazil in 1961. That year the club won its first Intercontinental Cup, defeating Benfica of Portugal 2–1 in the third game. Peñarol won three more league titles (1960, 1961 and 1962), for five consecutive championships. Béla Guttmann coached the team in 1962.

After a quiet year in 1963, Peñarol won the Uruguayan Championship in 1964 and 1965 and the Copa Libertadores in 1966, defeating River Plate 4–2. That year the club won its second Intercontinental Cup, defeating Real Madrid 2–0 in Centenario Stadium and Santiago Bernabéu. During the next few years the club won national championships in 1967 and 1968 and the Intercontinental Champions' Supercup in 1969 (a tournament with South American Intercontinental Cup winners). Peñarol had the longest undefeated run in Uruguayan league history: 56 games, from 3 September 1966 to 14 September 1968. Copa Libertadores all-time top scorer Alberto Spencer played for Peñarol at this time.

In 1970 the club again reached the Libertadores final again, losing to Estudiantes de La Plata. The club set a tournament record for greatest goal difference, defeating Valencia of Venezuela 11–2. With Fernando Morena as the team's star, the club won the Uruguayan championship for three consecutive years, from 1973 to 1975. After placing second in 1976 and 1977, Peñarol won again in 1978. That year, Morena set two records: most goals scored in a Uruguayan season (36) and most goals scored in a single game (seven, against Huracán Buceo on 16 July). The 1970s ended with another championship in 1979. Morena was top scorer in the Uruguayan tournament six straight times, and top Copa Libertadores scorer in 1974 and 1975.

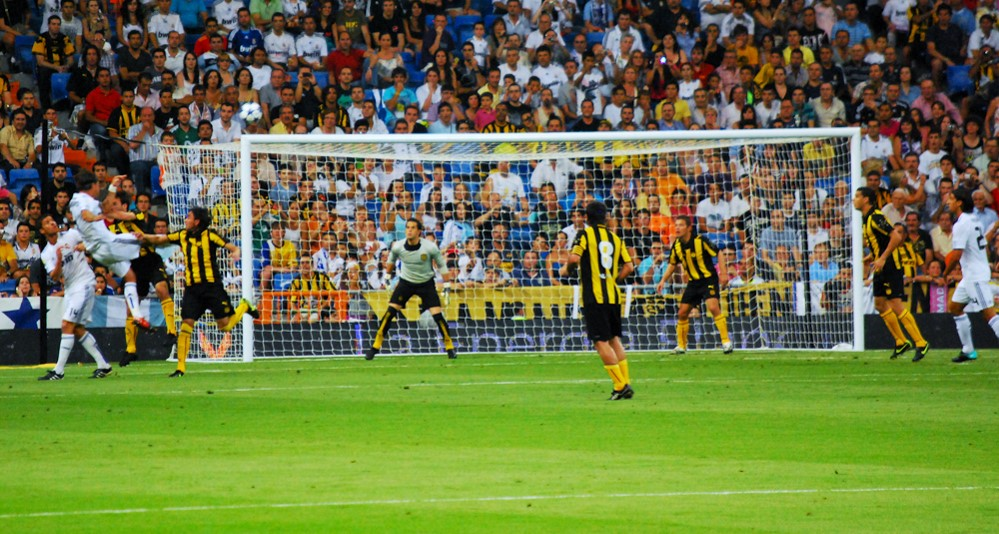
Peñarol in a friendly match with Real Madrid in the Santiago Bernabéu, August 2010

After beginning the 1980s with a third-place finish in 1981, Peñarol won the Uruguayan Championship with Fernando Morena and Rubén Paz (the tournament's top scorer). The next season the club again won the Copa Libertadores, defeating Cobreloa of Chile 1–0 on a goal from Fernando Morena (the tournament's top scorer with seven goals) in the game's final minutes. Later that year the club won the Uruguayan championship and its third Intercontinental Cup, defeating Aston Villa 2–0.

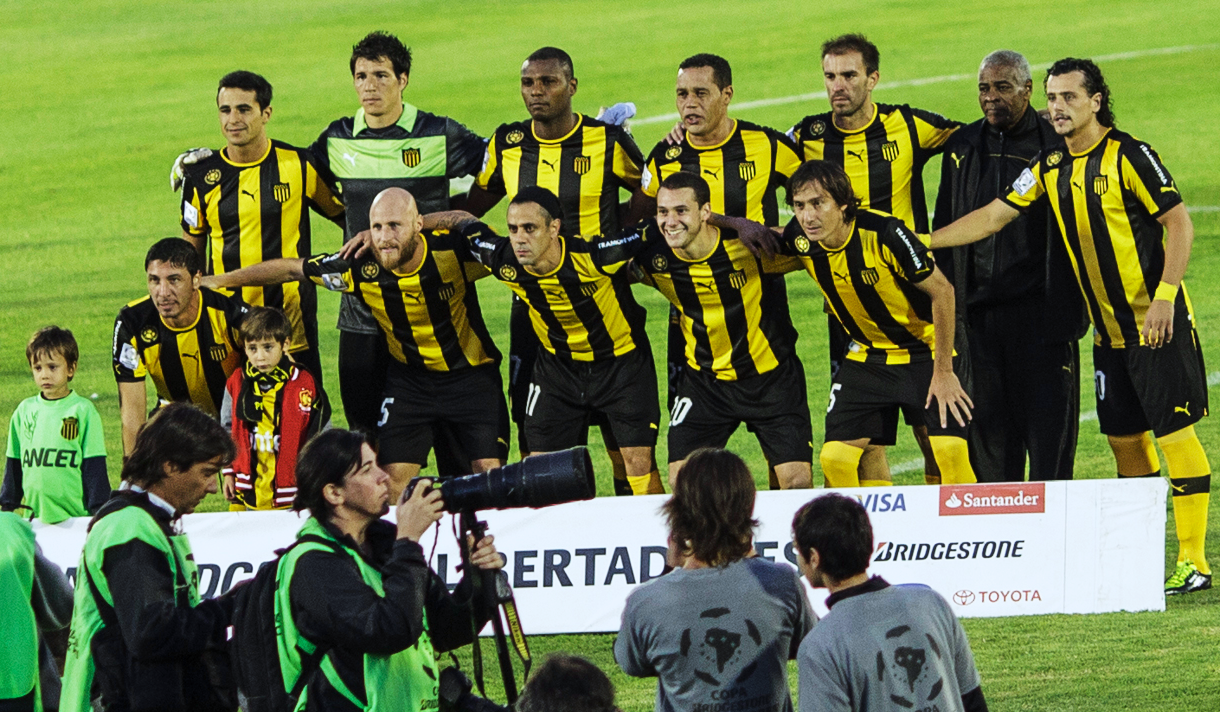
Peñarol players posing for photographers before 2013 Copa Libertadores preliminary game against Vélez Sarsfield

Despite financial problems during the 1980s, Peñarol won the national championship in 1985 and 1986, and a fifth Copa Libertadores in 1987. The club defeated América de Cali 1–0 with a goal by Diego Aguirre in the final seconds of extra time, when a tie would have gone to the Colombians on the goal differential. It was the third Copa Libertadores won by Peñarol at the Nacional de Chile, following victories in 1966 and 1982.

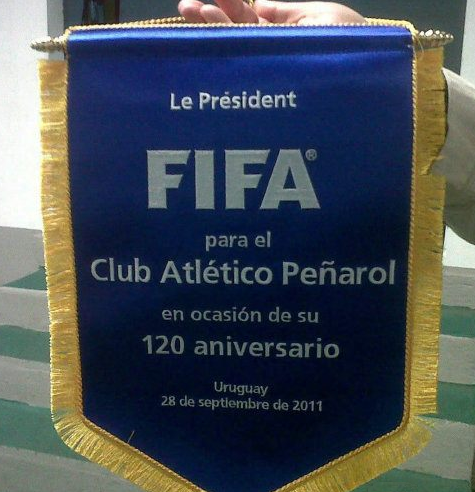
Banner awarded by FIFA for the club's 120th anniversary, September 2011

Peñarol celebrated its hundredth anniversary in 1991, despite a controversy ignited by archrivals Nacional concerning Peñarol's 1913 name change. With Pablo Bengoechea and the young Antonio Pacheco on the team and Gregorio Pérez behind the bench, Peñarol again won the Uruguayan championship five straight times (1993–97). The club also reached the Copa Conmebol final in 1994 and 1995, rounding out the century with a national championship in 1999 (defeating Nacional 2–1 in the final, despite Julio Ribas on the bench).

The next year, Peñarol lost the Uruguayan championship final against Nacional; many of the team's players were jailed after a tournament fight. Peñarol won the national championship again in 2003 for Diego Aguirre, defeating Nacional in the final. The club did not win another national title until the 2009–10 season, when it won the Clausura tournament with 14 victories in 15 games (12 of them in a row). In the Clausura final, Peñarol defeated Nacional 2–1. The championship qualified the team for the Libertadores 2011, where Peñarol reached the final with Santos.

The club was congratulated on its 120th anniversary in September 2011 by presidents Joseph Blatter, Michel Platini, and Nicolás Leoz.

== Crest and colors ==
=== Badge ===
Throughout the club's history minor changes have been made to its symbols, but it has kept its original colors. The shield and flag were designed by architect Constante Facello and consist of five black stripes, four yellow stripes and eleven yellow stars on a black background (representing the eleven players).

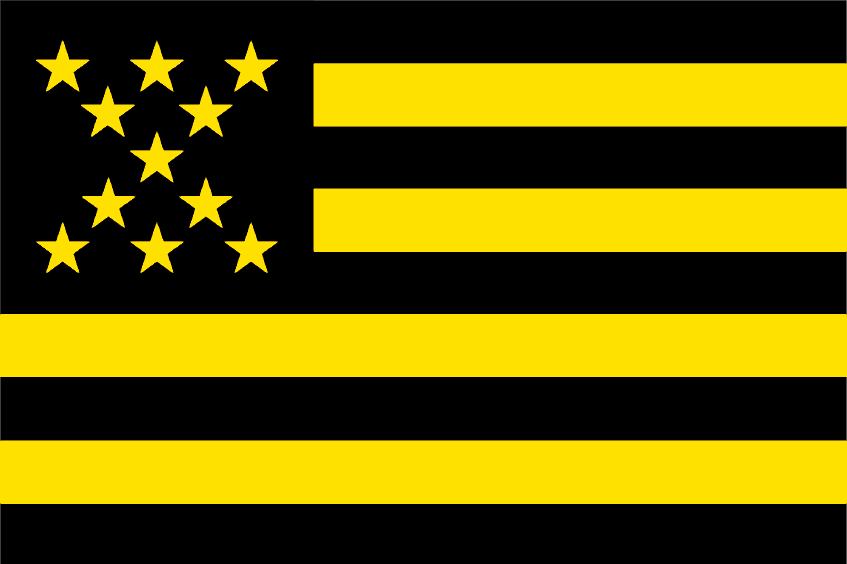
Current flag and crest of Peñarol

=== Uniforms ===
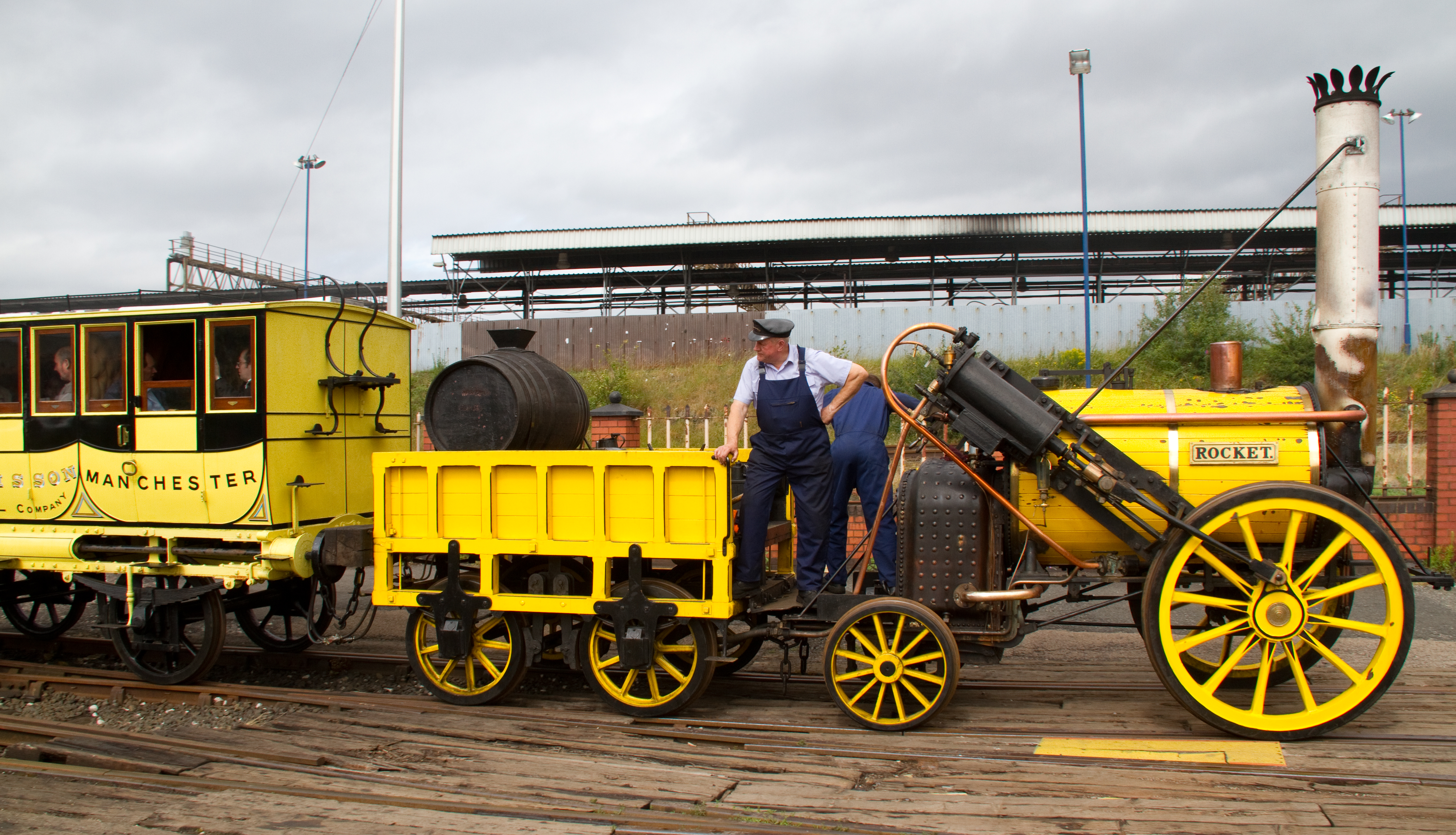
The Rocket locomotive inspired Peñarol's colors.

Since its founding, Peñarol's colors have been yellow and black. They were inspired by the Rocket locomotive designed by George Stephenson, which won an award in 1829.

The first jersey was a plain shirt, divided into four square sections which alternated black and yellow. A variant had two vertical halves (black on the right and black-and-yellow stripes on the left), with black shorts and socks. Peñarol's official jersey (black and yellow stripes) dates back to 1911 and has been worn almost continuously, with only slight variations.

=== Inspiration for Romanian club FC Brașov ===
Peñarol inspired Romanian club FC Brașov to change its official colors in December 1966 from white and blue to yellow and black. The change came following a tournament of Romania's Olympic football team in Uruguay. After a match with Peñarol, Csaba Györffy, player at FC Brașov, received from Peñarol's captain Alberto Spencer the shirt with which he played. Györffy was fascinated by the combination of yellow and black stripes and decided at the return in the country to wear the shirt during his training sessions with the team. The decision to change the colors of the club was taken by coach Silviu Ploeşteanu, who considered that, in the new colors, the team will be seen better on the field. Since January 1967, the team from Brașov has yellow-black as official colors, recalling Peñarol.

=== Kit evolution ===
CURCC 1891–96 (Note: Some sources say the CURCC colors were black and orange while others state the strip was black and yellow.)	CURCC 1896-1911 (Note: The CURCC shirt suffered minor variations in this design.)	CURCC/Peñarol 1911–present

=== Kit manufacturers ===
Period	Company
1979–84	(Germany) Adidas
1984–87	(France) Le Coq Sportif
1987–88	(Brazil) Topper
1988–91	(Germany) Puma
1991–96	(Argentina) Nanque
1996–97	(England) Umbro
1998–2000	(England) Reebok
2000	(Uruguay) Covadonga
2000–06	(England) Umbro
2006–present	(Germany) Puma

== Facilities ==
=== Stadium ===
==== Las Acacias ====
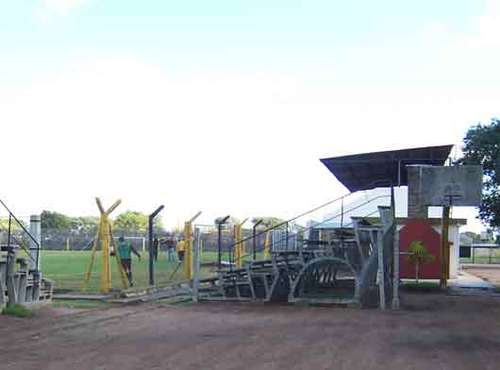
Estadio José Pedro Damiani, used for Peñarol's reserve matches

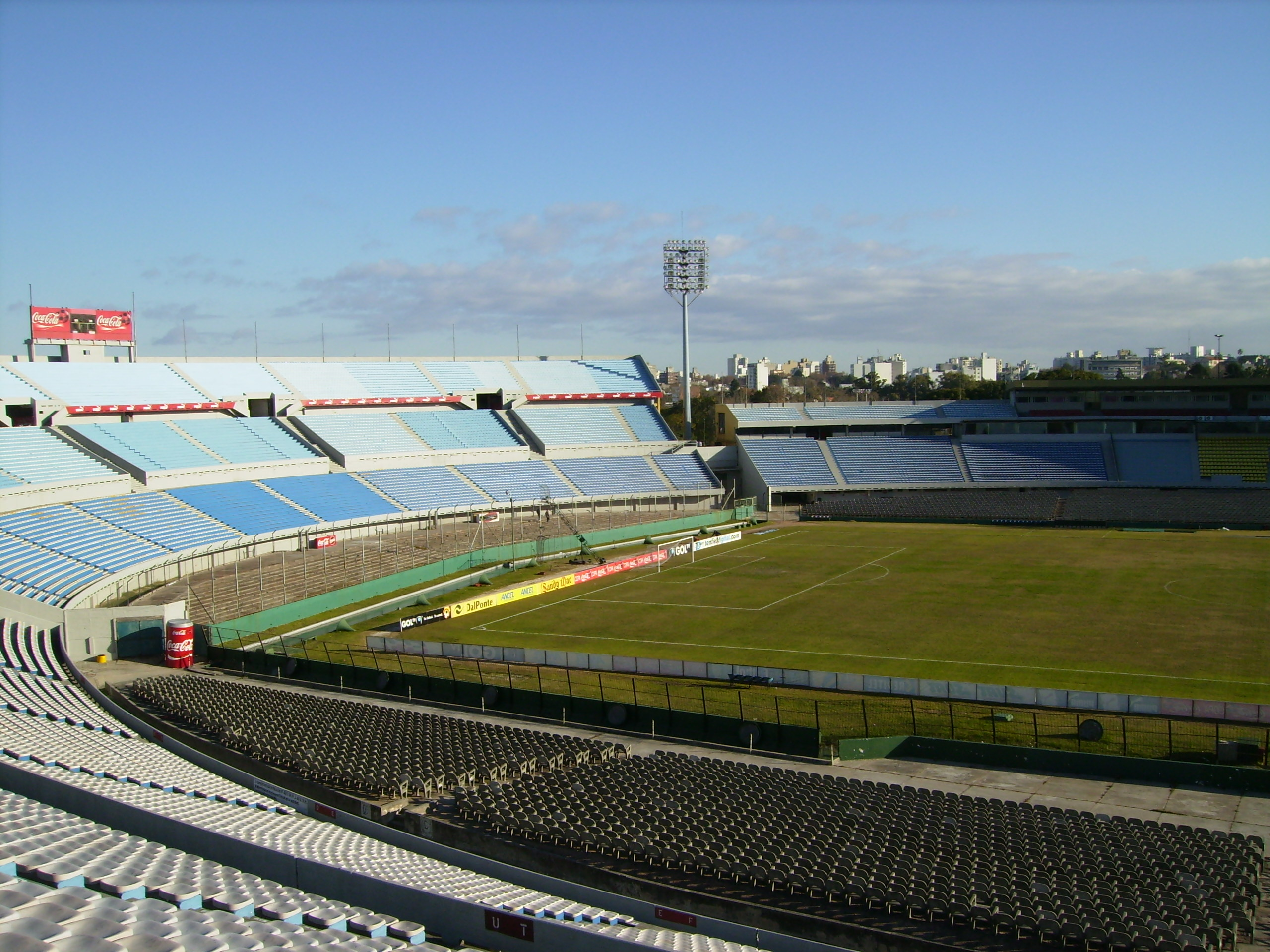
Estadio Centenario, Peñarol's former home ground

Peñarol's first stadium was the José Pedro Damiani, also known as Las Acacias. It was bought in 1913 and inaugurated on 19 April 1916 with a 3–1 victory over Nacional. The stadium's gate was originally part of the former Estadio Pocitos, Peñarol's first stadium where the first goal in the history of the FIFA World Cup was scored in 1930.

The stadium is in the Marconi neighbourhood of Montevideo. Its pitch is of 37,949 square metres (408,480 sq ft), and it has a capacity of 12,000. Because Peñarol was not allowed to play there due to security concerns, the club home ground was the city-owned Estadio Centenario. Opened on 18 July 1930, the Centenario stadium is in Parque Batlle and can hold 65,235. Las Acacias has acted as the home ground for all Peñarol's Youth Teams.

==== Campeón del Siglo ====
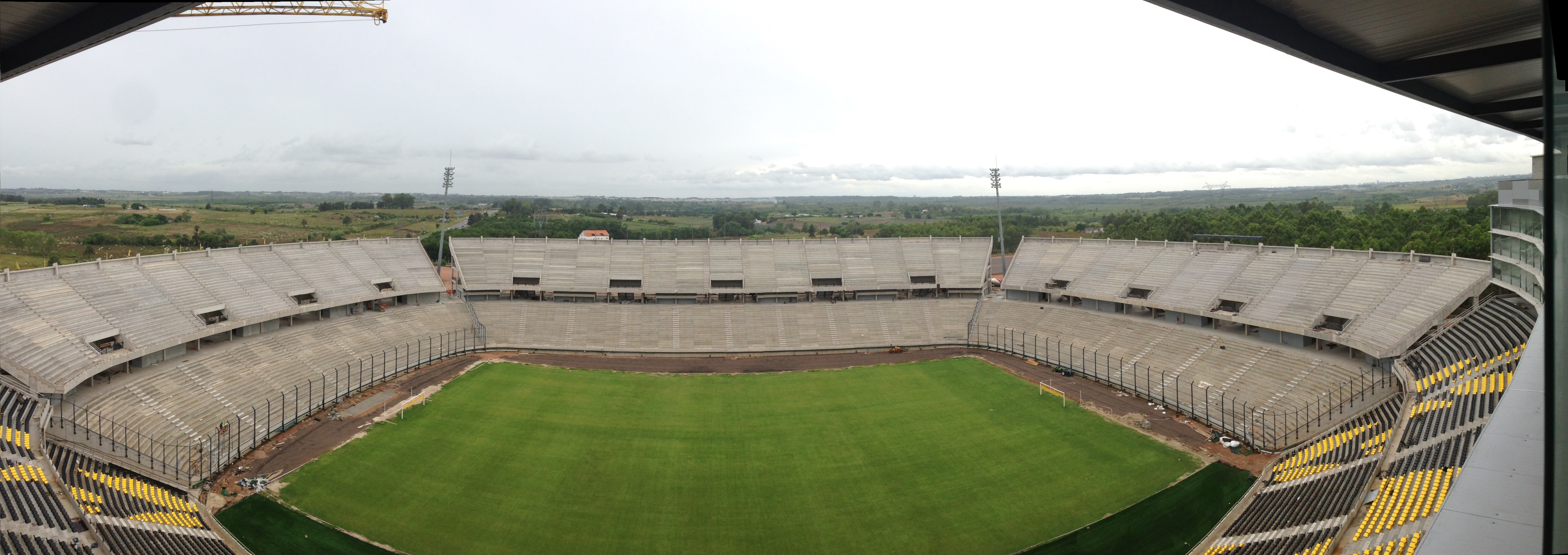
Estadio Campeón del Siglo, Peñarol's current home ground

On 28 September 2012, the club proposed a 40,000-capacity stadium in the outskirts of Montevideo, about 7 kilometres (4.3 mi) from the Aeropuerto Internacional de Carrasco. The name of their newest stadium is Campeón del Siglo (CDS), which was inaugurated in March 2016 and has been the home ground ever since.

=== Palacio Peñarol ===
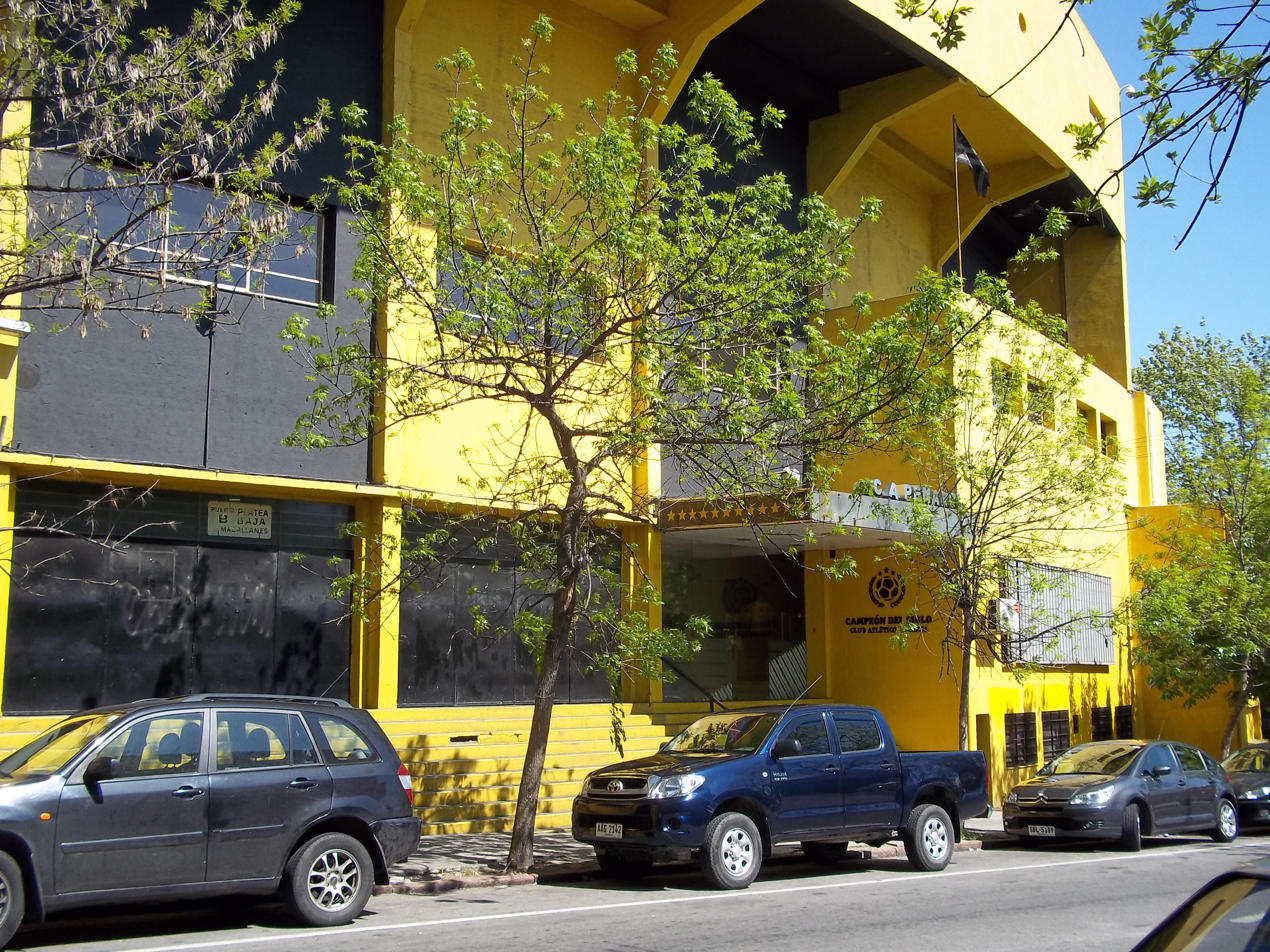
Outside of the Palacio Peñarol

The Palacio Peñarol, in downtown Montevideo, is the club's headquarters and basketball stadium. It was opened on 21 June 1955; and is located. The Palacio has 3,896 square metres (41,940 sq ft) in addition to basketball, it is home the club's museum and offices. After the October 2010 collapse of the Cilindro Municipal, the Palacio Peñarol became an important venue for Uruguayan basketball.

=== Complejo Deportivo Washington Cataldi ===
The Complejo Deportivo Washington Cataldi, commonly known as Los Aromos, is a training ground for the main team. In Villa Los Aromos of Barros Blancos, in the Canelones department, Los Aromos was bought in 1945; under the direction of architect José Donato, it was built in two years.

=== Centro de Alto Rendimiento ===
For the club's 118th anniversary, the Centro de Alto Rendimiento was inaugurated. The new facility, which opened on 28 September 2009, includes five football pitches, a weight room and a gymnasium with artificial turf.

=== Frank Henderson School ===
The Frank Henderson School, named in honor of the club's first president, is a few kilometers away from the Centro de Alto Rendimiento. It was built to develop the club's young players, and houses those who come from other areas.

== Supporters ==
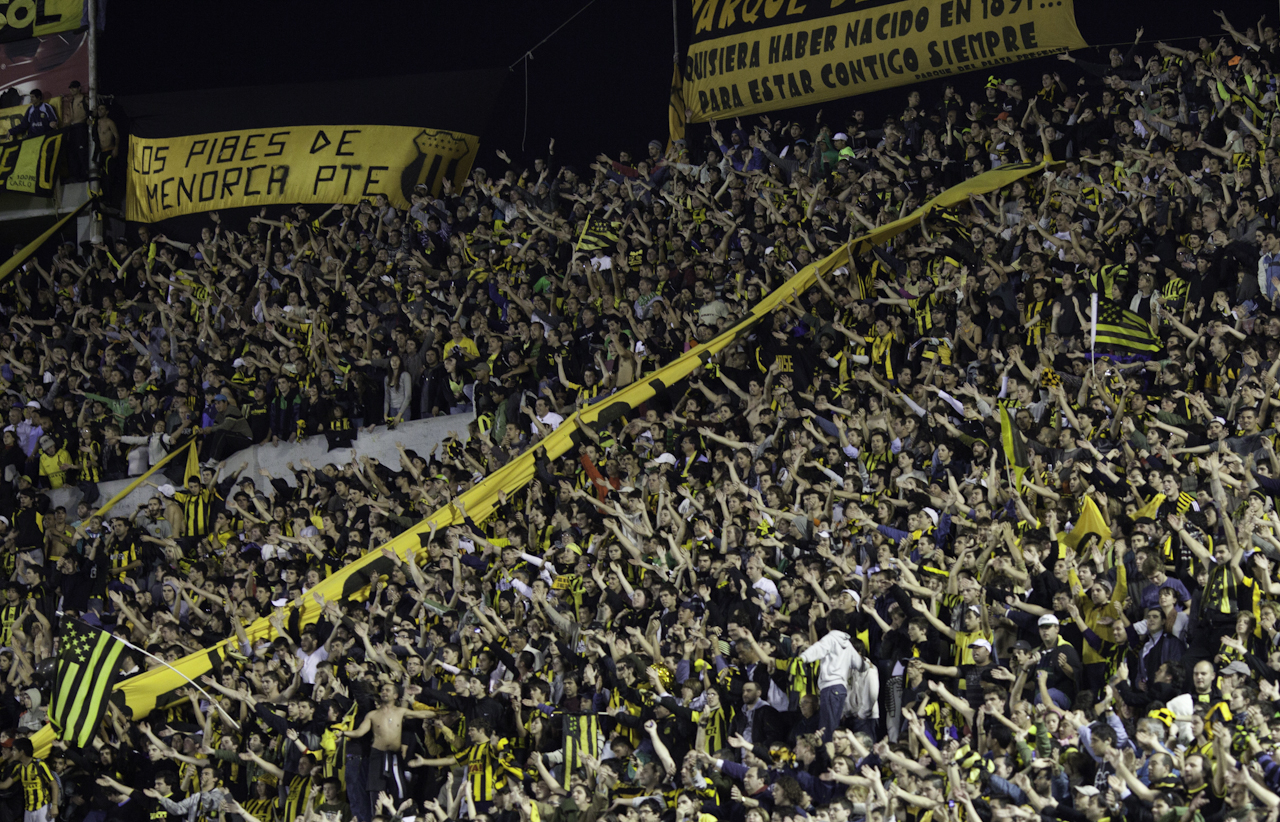
Fans at a match, May 2010

In Uruguayan football, loyalty to Peñarol or Nacional divides the country. The clubs are evenly matched, and have a large fan base. Many surveys of public opinion have been conducted, but none have been conclusive. In 1993 the Factum consulting firm reported that Peñarol was the favorite team of 41 percent of football fans, while 38 percent supported Nacional. Factum conducted another survey in 2006, confirming its previous results: Peñarol with 45 percent and Nacional with 35 percent.

MPC Consultants surveyed 9,000 Uruguayans; Peñarol had 45 percent of the supporters, and Nacional 38 percent. An online survey on the webpage Sportsvs.com showed Nacional with 50.35 percent and Peñarol with 49.45 percent.

Since its formation, Peñarol's barra brava has been involved in violence against other clubs and the Uruguayan police. Incidents provoked by these fans have cost Peñarol 31 points since 1994; the penalties cost the team three tournaments (Apertura 1994, Clausura 1997 and Clausura 2002).

=== Fan club ===
In 2010 the club attempted to increase its fan base to improve its sustainability. During Clausura 2010 promotions were offered, marketing managers hired and the peñas (local fan clubs) encouraged. The campaign was successful; in February 2013 the club had over 62,000 members, the largest fan club in Uruguay.

=== Rivalries ===
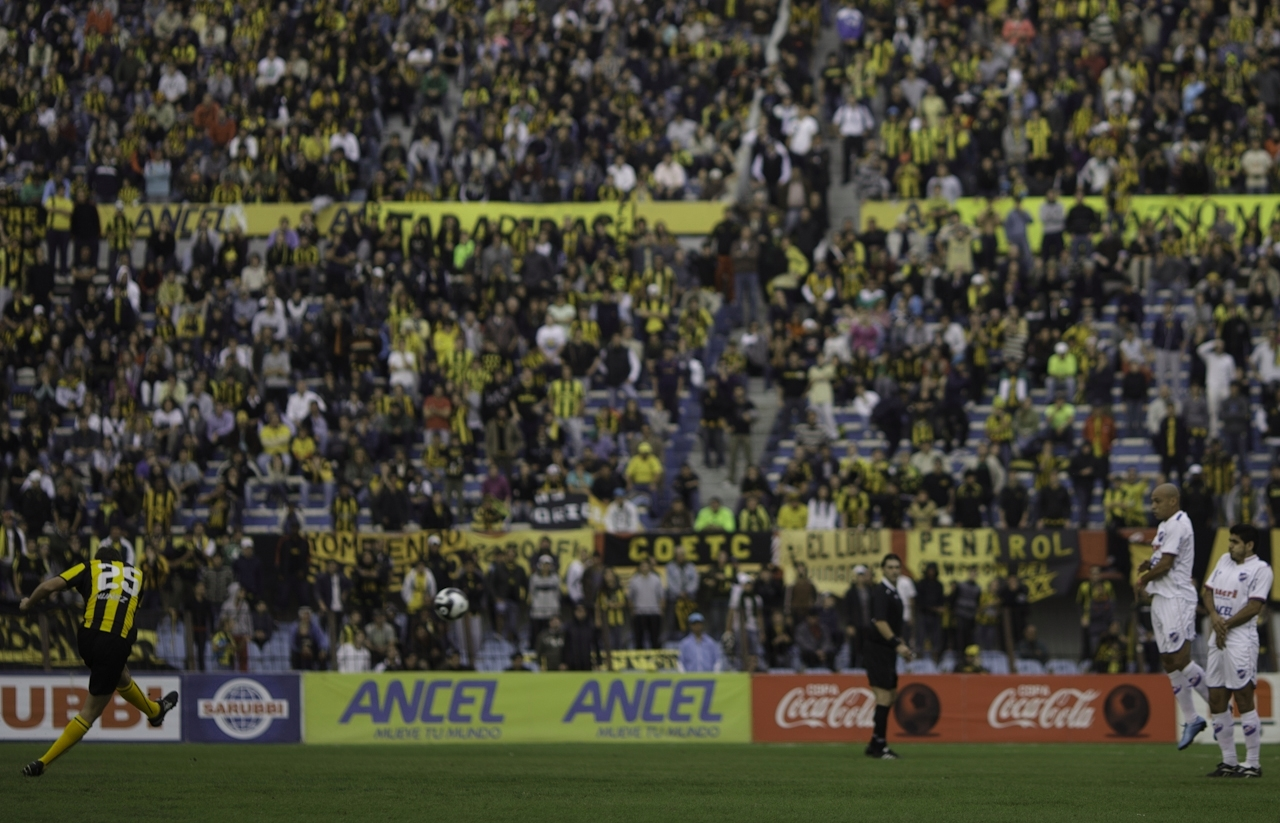
Gastón Ramírez taking free kick against Nacional in the second final of the 2009–10 Primera División season

The Uruguayan Derby between Peñarol and Nacional goes back to 1900, the oldest football rivalry outside the British Islands. The first game ever played between Nacional and CURCC was on 15 July 1900 and ended 2–0 in favor of CURCC. CURCC was ahead at first, but Nacional caught up during the late 1910s. Nacional took the lead by fourteen games in 1948, and would not surrender it until the late 1970s (except briefly in 1968). Since then, Peñarol has been the leader; its longest lead was 26 games in January 2004. Including the amateur and professional eras, league and friendly games, the teams have met 511 times in the past with 182 victories to Peñarol, 166 to Nacional and 163 ties.

A notable game for Peñarol fans is occurred on 9 October 1949 in the Uruguayan Cup first round, and is known as the Clásico de la fuga (the "escape derby"). At the end of the first half Peñarol was leading 2–0, but at halftime Nacional decided not to return. While Peñarol fans believe that Nacional did not want to be defeated by a Peñarol team known as the Máquina del 49 ("Machine of 49"), Nacional supporters claim it was a protest against poor officiating.

On 23 April 1987 for a friendly game, Peñarol and Nacional were tied 1–1 with 22 minutes remaining when three Peñarol players (José Perdomo, José Herrera and Ricardo Viera) were ejected after a foul and subsequent protests. Peñarol then had to face a full Nacional team with only eight players on the pitch. With eight minutes remaining Diego Aguirre set up Jorge Cabrera, who scored the winning goal. This win by the aurinegro was known as the Clásico de los 8 contra 11 (the "8 against 11 derby").

Peñarol and Nacional have faced each other in the final game of the Uruguayan Championship thirteen times, with Peñarol winning eight. The most recent was in 2018, when Peñarol won the championship 2–1.

=== Manyas: The Movie ===
In early October 2011 Manyas: The Movie, a documentary about Peñarol's fans, was released in Uruguay. Produced by Kafka Films and Sacromonte and directed by Andrés Benvenuto, the film features interviews with fans, football journalists, psychologists and politicians. Manyas: The Movie was deemed of cultural interest by the Culture and Education Ministry of Uruguay and of ministerial interest by Uruguay's Ministry of Tourism and Sport. The film had the most-successful premiere of any Uruguayan film, selling 13,000 tickets during its first weekend and 30,000 over its first fifteen days.

=== World's Biggest flag ===
After raising $35,000 in raffles and donations, on 12 April 2011 Peñarol fans unveiled the largest flag ever unfurled in a stadium up to that moment. Nacional unfurled a bigger one years later that covered three stands of the stadium. The flag, 309 metres (1,014 ft) long and 46 metres (151 ft) wide for a surface area of 14,124 square metres (152,030 sq ft), covered one-and-a-half grandstands in Centenario Stadium. In 2013, Club Nacional de Football displayed a flag which was 600 metres long by 50 metres wide. This is now the world's biggest flag.

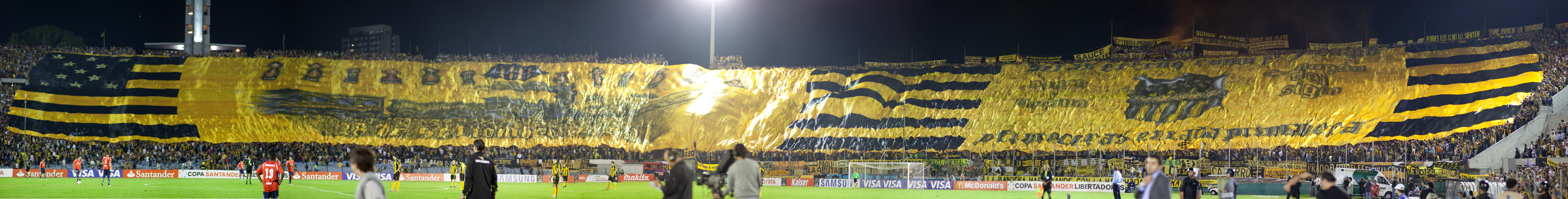
Giant flag displayed at the Centenario Stadium in Montevideo

== Players ==
=== First-team squad ===
As of 2 September 2026

Note: Flags indicate national team as defined under FIFA eligibility rules; some limited exceptions apply. Players may hold more than one non-FIFA nationality.

No.	Pos.	Nation	Player
1	GK	URU	Sebastián Britos
2	DF	ARG	Germán Pezzella
3	DF	URU	Mauricio Lemos
4	DF	URU	Franco Romero
5	MF	ARG	Eric Remedi
6	DF	URU	Lucas Ferreira (on loan from Defensa y Justicia)
7	FW	URU	Javier Cabrera
8	MF	URU	Nicolás Fernández
9	FW	URU	Facundo Batista
10	MF	URU	Leonardo Fernández
11	FW	ARG	Leonel Jaime (on loan from River Plate)
12	GK	URU	Leandro Díaz
13	MF	URU	Eduardo Darias
14	MF	URU	Julio Daguer
15	DF	URU	Maximiliano Olivera (captain)
16	MF	URU	Tomás Olase
18	MF	URU	Germán Barbas
19	FW	URU	Matías Arezo
20	DF	URU	Kevin Rodríguez
21	MF	URU	Jesús Trindade

No.	Pos.	Nation	Player
22	DF	URU	Facundo Álvez
23	FW	ARG	Gonzalo Gelini (on loan from Boca Juniors)
25	DF	URU	Matías González
26	DF	URU	Thiago Espinosa (on loan from América)
27	DF	URU	Lucas Hernández (vice-captain)
28	DF	URU	Ignacio Alegre
29	GK	URU	Washington Aguerre
30	MF	URU	Stiven Muhlethaler
32	MF	URU	Leandro Umpiérrez
33	FW	URU	Jonathan Rodríguez
34	DF	URU	Nahuel Herrera
36	DF	URU	Brian Barboza (on loan from Toluca)
40	FW	URU	Brandon Álvarez
42	FW	URU	Luciano González
55	MF	URU	Lorenzo Couture
77	FW	COL	Luis Angulo (on loan from Talleres)
80	MF	URU	Franco González
93	DF	URU	Diego Laxalt
99	FW	URU	Abel Hernández
—	DF	URU	Andrés Madruga

=== Noted players ===
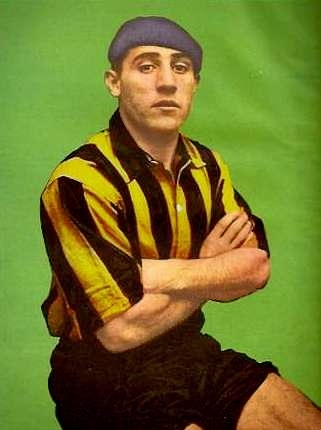
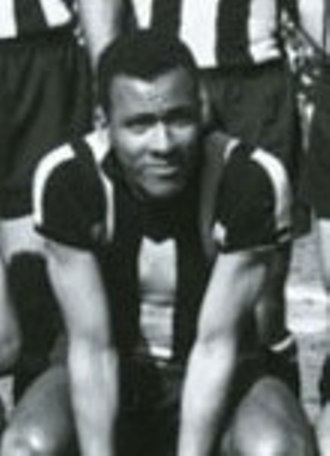
Severino Varela won the Uruguayan championship in 1938 while Alberto Spencer is the club's top scorer in international competitions with 58 goals

Néstor Gonçalves has the most official games in the club's history (571 matches), between 28 April 1957 and 28 November 1970. The team's all-time top scorers in the Primera División are Fernando Morena (203), Alberto Spencer (113) and Óscar Míguez (107). Morena's (whose 230 goals—203 with Peñarol and 27 with River Plate—make him the highest-scoring player in the Uruguayan League) 440 goals with Peñarol are a record as well. He scored the most goals in a single Uruguayan season (36 in 1978), and is the club's second-best goal scorer in international competition with 37 goals (behind Alberto Spencer, who scored 58 goals between 1960 and 1970). Spencer and Morena are the top scorers in Copa Libertadores history, with 48 and 37 goals respectively for Peñarol. (Note: Alberto Spencer scored 54 times in the Copa Libertadores, 48 with Peñarol and 6 with Barcelona.)

Peñarol has made a large contribution to the Uruguay national football team. Three Peñarol players were on the Uruguayan team which played Argentina in 1905. Five Peñarol players were on the Uruguayan squad which won the 1930 FIFA World Cup: goalkeeper Miguel Capuccini, defender Peregrino Anselmo and midfielders Lorenzo Fernández, Álvaro Gestido and Carlos Riolfo. Peñarol had nine players on the Uruguayan squad which won the 1950 FIFA World Cup: goalkeeper Roque Máspoli, defenders Juan Carlos González and Washington Ortuño, midfielders Juan Alberto Schiaffino and Obdulio Varela and forwards Ernesto Vidal, Julio César Britos, Óscar Míguez and Alcides Ghiggia. Schiaffino and Ghiggia scored the team's two goals in the Maracanazo, the final game against Brazil. Peñarol is the only club which has represented Uruguay in all its World Cup appearances.

== Managers ==
While there is no hard information about managers in the amateur era of Uruguayan football, Peñarol has had a total of 62 coaches during its professional era. The first manager was Leonardo de Luca, who coached the team for two years and won the Uruguayan Championship (the first professional tournament in Uruguay) in 1932.

Of these 62 managers, 53 were Uruguayan; two were Hungarian (Emérico Hirschl and Béla Guttmann), two British (John Harley and Randolph Galloway), one Serbian (Ljupko Petrović), two Brazilian (Osvaldo Brandão and Dino Sani), one from Chile (Mario Tuane) and two from Argentina (Jorge Kistenmacher and César Luis Menotti).

Hugo Bagnulo and Gregorio Pérez have coached Peñarol the longest, leading the first team for eight seasons: Bagnulo for four stints and Pérez for five. Athuel Velásquez had the longest uninterrupted coaching period for Peñarol (five straight years, between 1935 and 1940). Bagnulo has the most Uruguayan championships (five); Pérez and Velásquez follow, with four each. In international competition Roberto Scarone was the most successful manager, winning two Copa Libertadores and an Intercontinental Cup with Peñarol.

=== Professional-era managers ===
Caretaker managers in italics

- Leonardo de Luca (1932–34)
- José Piendibene (1934)
- Athuel Velásquez (1935–40)
- José Piendibene (1940–41)
- Leonardo de Luca (1941)
- Luis Manuel Morquio (1941)
- Lorenzo Fernández (1941–42)
- John Harley (1942)
- Leonardo de Luca (1942–43)
- Juan Pedro Arremón (1943)
- Pedro de Hegedüs (1943)
- Aníbal Tejada (1944)
- Alberto Suppici (1945)
- Aníbal Tejada (1946)
- Jorge Clulow (1947)
- Randolph Galloway (1948)
- Imre Hirschl (1949–51)
- Juan López (1952–55)
- Roque Máspoli and Obdulio Varela (1955–55)
- Imre Hirschl (1956)
- Gerardo Spósito (1957)
- Hugo Bagnulo (1958–59)
- Roberto Scarone (1959–61)
- Béla Guttmann (1962)
- Pelegrín Anselmo (1962)
- Roque Máspoli (1963–67)
- Rafael Milans (1968–69)
- Osvaldo Brandão (1969–70)
- Roque Máspoli (1970–71)
- Juan Eduardo Hohberg (1971)
- Ondino Viera (1972)
- Juan Ricardo Faccio (1972–73)
- Hugo Bagnulo (1973–74)
- José María Rodríguez (1974)
- Hugo Bagnulo (1974–75)
- Juan Alberto Schiaffino (1975–76)
- Roque Máspoli (1976)
- Dino Sani (1977–80)
- Mario Tuane (1980)
- Luis Prais (1980)
- José Etchegoyen (1980)
- Jorge Kistenmacher (1980)
- Alcides Ghiggia (1980)
- Luis Cubilla (1981)
- Hugo Bagnulo (1982–83)
- Osvaldo Balseiro (1983)
- Hugo Fernández (1984)
- César Luis Menotti (1984–85)
- Roque Máspoli (1985–86)
- Ramón Silva (1986)
- Óscar Tabárez (1987)
- Fernando Morena (1988)
- Roque Máspoli (1988)
- Ladislao Mazurkiewicz (1988–89)
- Walter Roque (1989)
- Roberto Fleitas (1989–90)
- César Luis Menotti (1990–91)
- Juan Duarte (1991)
- Ricardo "Tato" Ortiz (1991–92)
- Ljupko Petrović (1992)
- Roque Máspoli (1992)
- Walter Olivera (1992)
- Juan Ricardo Faccio (1992)
- Gregorio Pérez (1993–95)
- Jorge Fossati (1996)
- Alejandro Botello (1996)
- Gregorio Pérez (1997–98)
- Julio Ribas (1999–01)
- Gregorio Pérez (2002)
- Diego Aguirre (2003–05)
- Fernando Morena (2005)
- Luis Garisto (2006)
- Mario Saralegui (24 April 2006 – 30 June 2006)
- Gregorio Pérez (15 July 2006 – 30 June 2007)
- Gustavo Matosas (2007)
- Mario Saralegui (11 March 2008 – 19 January 2009)
- Julio Ribas (20 January 2009 – 14 September 2009)
- Víctor Púa (14 September 2009 – 14 December 2009)
- Diego Aguirre (7 December 2009 – 6 June 2010)
- Manuel Keosseian (1 July 2010 – 23 November 2010)
- Edison Machín (2010)
- Diego Aguirre (7 December 2010 – 6 September 2011)
- Gregorio Pérez (6 September 2011 – 27 February 2012)
- Jorge Gonçalves (27 February 2012 – 1 March 2012)
- Jorge da Silva (1 March 2012 – 30 June 2013)
- Diego Alonso (19 June 2013 – 6 October 2013)
- Jorge Gonçalves (7 October 2013 – 28 January 2014)
- Jorge Fossati (28 January 2014–14)
- Paolo Montero (2014–15)
- Pablo Bengoechea (2015–16)
- Jorge da Silva (2016–October 2016)
- Fernando Curutchet (October 2016-December 2016)
- Leonardo Ramos (December 2016 - June 2018)
- Diego López (June 2018 – December 2019)
- Diego Forlán (January 2020 – September 2020)
- Mario Saralegui (September 2020 – December 2020)
- Mauricio Larriera (December 2020 – August 2023)

=== Current staff ===
- Coach: Diego Vicente Aguirre
- Assistant coaches: Juan Manuel Olivera
- Trainers: Eduardo Del Capellán
- Goalkeepers' Coach: Óscar Ferro
- Fitness coach: Alejandro Valenzuela
- Assistant fitness coach: Sebastián Roquero
- Head of medical department: Edgardo Rienzi
- Club Doctor: Horacio Deccia
- Nurses: Miguel Domínguez, Fernando Robaina
- Kinesiologists: Marcos Sosa, Mauricio Velázquez
- Equipier: Miguel Santos
- Props man: Germán Pellejero

== Administration ==
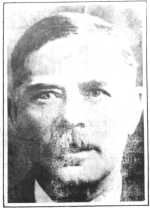
Frank Henderson, first president of the CURCC

During a meeting presided over by Roland Moor on 28 September 1891, it was stipulated that responsibility for the Central Uruguay Railway Cricket Club would belong to the principal administrator of the Central Uruguay Railway Company of Montevideo. The first president of the club was Frank Henderson, who remained in that office until 1899.

After Henderson CUR administrators remained as chairmen of the sports club until 1906, when Charles W. Bayne took over the CUR. Bayne refused to sponsor the CURCC because of vandalism by fans and absenteeism by workers. He was replaced by CUR employee Roland Moor.

Conflicts remained between the company and the sports club, which resulted in the separation of CURCC's football section from the company and a name change to Club Atlético Peñarol. Jorge Clulow, an Englishman with Uruguayan nationality, was chosen chairman of the club; he remained in office from 1914 to 1915.

=== Presidents ===
- 1891–99: Frank Henderson
- 1899–05: Frank Hudson
- 1906–08: Roland C.J. Moor
- 1909–13: Percy Sedgfield
- 1914–15: Jorge H. Clulow
- 1916–17: Francisco Simón
- 1918: Félix Polleri
- 1919: César Batlle Pacheco
- 1920: Félix Polleri
- 1921–28: Julio María Sosa
- 1929: Arturo Abella
- 1930–31: Luis Giorgi
- 1932: Juan Antonio Scasso
- 1933–34: Alberto Demicheli
- 1934: Pedro Viapina
- 1935–36: Luis Giorgi
- 1937: Francisco Tochetti
- 1938: Alberto Mantrana Garín
- 1939: Eduardo Alliaume
- 1940: Francisco Tochetti
- 1941–42: Bolívar Baliñas
- 1942: Álvaro Macedo
- 1943: Armando Lerma
- 1944–48: Constante Turturiello
- 1949–51: Eduardo Alliaume
- 1952–55: José Buzzetti
- 1956: Raúl Previtali
- 1957: Eduardo Alliaume
- 1958–72: Gastón Guelfi
- 1973–84: Washington Cataldi
- 1985–86: Carlos José Lecueder
- 1987–90: José Pedro Damiani
- 1991–92: Washington Cataldi
- 1993–07: José Pedro Damiani
- 2008–2017: Juan Pedro Damiani
- 2017-2020: Jorge Barrera
- 2020- : Juan Ignacio Ruglio

Honorary

- 1929: Julio María Sosa
- 1938: Francisco Tochetti
- 1949: Constante Turturiello
- 1953: Mantrana Garin
- 1953: Carlos Balsán
- 1961: Gastón Guelfi
- 1978: Washington Cataldi
- 1991: José Pedro Damiani (Note: Year denotes receipt of award)
- Julio María Sanguinetti

=== Board members 2020–2023 ===
Position	Name
President	Juan Ignacion Ruglio
Vice President/Treasurer	Eduardo Zaidensztat
General secretary	Evaristo González
Assistant Secretary	Jorge Nirenberg
Assistant Treasurer	Marcos Acle
Board Members	Alvaro Queijo
Board Members	Juan Pedro Damiani
Board Members	Gaston Tealdi
Board Members	Rodolfo Catino
Board Members	Pablo Amaro
Board Members	Guillermo Varela
AUF Delegates	Gonzalo Moratorio
AUF Delegates	Juan Antonio Rodríguez
AUF Delegates	Julio Trostchansky

== Statistics ==
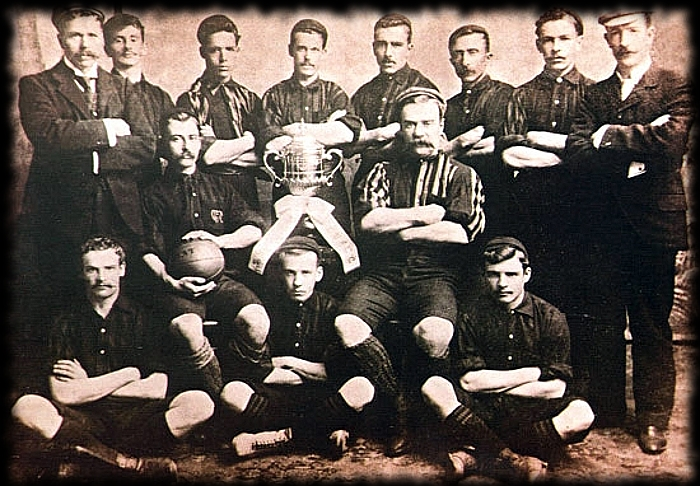
1900 CURCC team

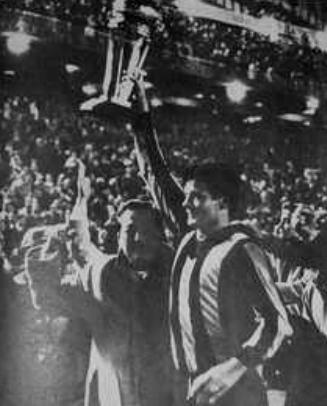
In 1982, Peñarol became the first club in the world to win the Intercontinental Cup for a third time (the previous had been in 1961 and 1966, displayed on the image)

Peñarol played 26 seasons of the Uruguay Association Football League, from its creation in 1900 until the end of the amateur era in 1931 (absent 1923–26, when the club was disaffiliated from the AUF). During this period Peñarol won the Uruguayan Championship nine times, with its best years in 1900 and 1905 (when the club won the championship without conceding any points). Peñarol was undefeated in 1901, 1903 and 1907. (Note: Moreover, in 1903 CURCC did not lose during the regular season, but lost the tiebreaker final against Nacional 2–3.) Its worst year was 1908; the team left the league after ten games, forfeiting the other eight. Peñarol's largest goal difference in a game during its amateur era was in 1903, when they defeated Triunfo 12–0.

The club placed second in 1923 (when they scored a record 100 goals), and won in 1924; its most impressive victory was a 10–0 win over Roberto Cherry during the cancelled 1925 season. Both tournaments were organised by dissident body Uruguayan Football Federation (FUF).

Since the beginning of the professional era in 1932, Peñarol and Nacional are the only teams who have played every season for the Uruguayan championship. (Note: In 1948 the tournament was cancelled because of a player strike.) Peñarol has the most Uruguayan League titles (winning 38 times between 1932 and 2013) and the greatest number of undefeated championships (1949, 1954, 1964, 1967, 1968, 1975 and 1978). Its best performances were in 1949 and 1964, seasons when the team scored 94.44 percent of possible points; its worst season was 2005–06, when it finished in 16th place after winning 32.32 percent of possible points. A 12-point deduction given the team by the AUF because of unrest after a game with Cerro relegated them to that position.

Peñarol's best victory was a 9–0 win against Rampla Juniors in 1962; its worst defeat was 0–6 against Nacional. On the international scene, its best result was an 11–2 win over Valencia of Venezuela on 15 March 1970; its worst was against Olimpia of Paraguay, a 0–6 loss on 10 December 1990 during the Supercopa Sudamericana.

Peñarol holds a number of national and international records. The club has the longest undefeated run in the Uruguayan league: 56 games, from 3 September 1966 to 14 September 1968. This is also the longest undefeated run in South American professional football (second place if amateur leagues are counted).

It was the first club to win the Copa Libertadores de América undefeated, in 1960. Peñarol has the greatest number of appearances in the Copa Libertadores (40), and the second most appearances in the finals (10) after Boca Juniors. The club holds the record for the biggest win (11–2 against Valencia), and the biggest goal difference in a two-legged elimination (defeating Everest from Ecuador 5–0 and 9–1). Peñarol is one of the teams with five Intercontinental Cup appearances, the first to reach that number.

== Honours ==
=== Senior titles ===
Keys

- Record
- ^{(s)} Shared record

Type	Competition	Titles	Winning years
National (League)	Primera División	52	1900, 1901, 1905, 1907, 1911; (Note: Titles won by the CURCC. With FIFA and CONMEBOL recognising Peñarol as CURCC's continuity, the club included those championship in their list of honours. On the other side, some historians say that football became active in CURCC until its dissolution in 1913 so Peñarol was a different institution.) 1918, 1921, 1928, 1929, 1932, 1935, 1936, 1937, 1938, 1944, 1945, 1949, 1951, 1953, 1954, 1958, 1959, 1960, 1961, 1962, 1964, 1965, 1967, 1968, 1973, 1974, 1975, 1978, 1979, 1981, 1982, 1985, 1986, 1993, 1994, 1995, 1996, 1997, 1999, 2003, 2009–10, 2012–13, 2015–16, 2017, 2018, 2021, 2024
National (League)	Primera División (FUF)	1	1924
National (League)	Primera División (Consejo Provisorio)	1	1926
Half-year / Short tournament (League)	Torneo Apertura	7	1995, 1996, 2012–13, 2015–16, 2019, 2023, 2024
Half-year / Short tournament (League)	Torneo Clausura	12	1994, 1999, 2000, 2003, 2007–08, 2009–10, 2015, 2017, 2018, 2021, 2024, 2025
Half-year / Short tournament (League)	Torneo Intermedio	2	2025, 2026
Half-year / Short tournament (League)	Torneo Clasificatorio	2	2001, 2002
National (Cups)	Copa Uruguay	1	2025
National (Cups)	Supercopa Uruguaya	3^{(s)}	2018, 2022, 2026
National (Cups)	Liguilla Pre-Libertadores	12	1974, 1975, 1977, 1978, 1980, 1984, 1985, 1986, 1988, 1994, 1997, 2004
National (Cups)	Torneo de Honor	11	1944, 1945, 1947, 1949, 1950, 1951, 1952, 1953, 1956, 1964, 1967
National (Cups)	Torneo Competencia	11	1936, 1941, 1943, 1946, 1947, 1949, 1951, 1953, 1956, 1957, 1986
National (Cups)	Copa de Honor	4	1907, 1909, 1911, 1918
National (Cups)	Copa Competencia	8	1901, 1902, 1904, 1905, 1907, 1909, 1910, 1916
National (Cups)	Torneo Cuadrangular	5	1959, 1960, 1963, 1966, 1968
National (Cups)	Copa Albion de Caridad	3	1916, 1917, 1921
National (Cups)	Liga Mayor	1	1978
National (Cups)	Torneo Artigas - Copa Casa de Catalina	3	1909, 1910, 1911
National (Cups)	Torneo Especial	1	1929
National (Cups)	Torneo Campeones Sudamericanos Juveniles	1	1954
National (Cups)	Campeonato Especial	1	1968
National (Cups)	Torneo de la República	1	1979
National (Cups)	Torneo Montevideo	1	1980
National (Cups)	Torneo Colombes	1	1980
National (Cups)	Torneo Copa de Oro	1	1982
National (Cups)	Torneo Prensa Deportiva	1	1983
National (Cups)	Torneo 60.º Aniversario de Colombes	1	1984
International (Cups)	Intercontinental Cup	3^{(s)}	1961, 1966, 1982
International (Cups)	Copa Libertadores	5	1960, 1961, 1966, 1982, 1987
International (Cups)	Intercontinental Champions' Supercup	1^{(s)}	1969
International (Cups)	Copa de Honor Cousenier (AFA/AUF) (Note: Established before CONMEBOL was created, this Cup was organized by the Argentine and Uruguayan Associations, between teams that belonged to them.)	3	1909, 1911, 1918
International (Cups)	Tie Cup (AFA/AUF)	1	1916
International (Cups)	Copa Aldao (AFA/AUF)	1	1928
Invitational (Cup)	IFA Shield (IFA) (Note: Fourth oldest club competition, organized by the IFA (W.B.) and played between local clubs of West Bengal and other invited ones.)	1	1985
Invitational (Cup)	Teide Trophy	1	1990

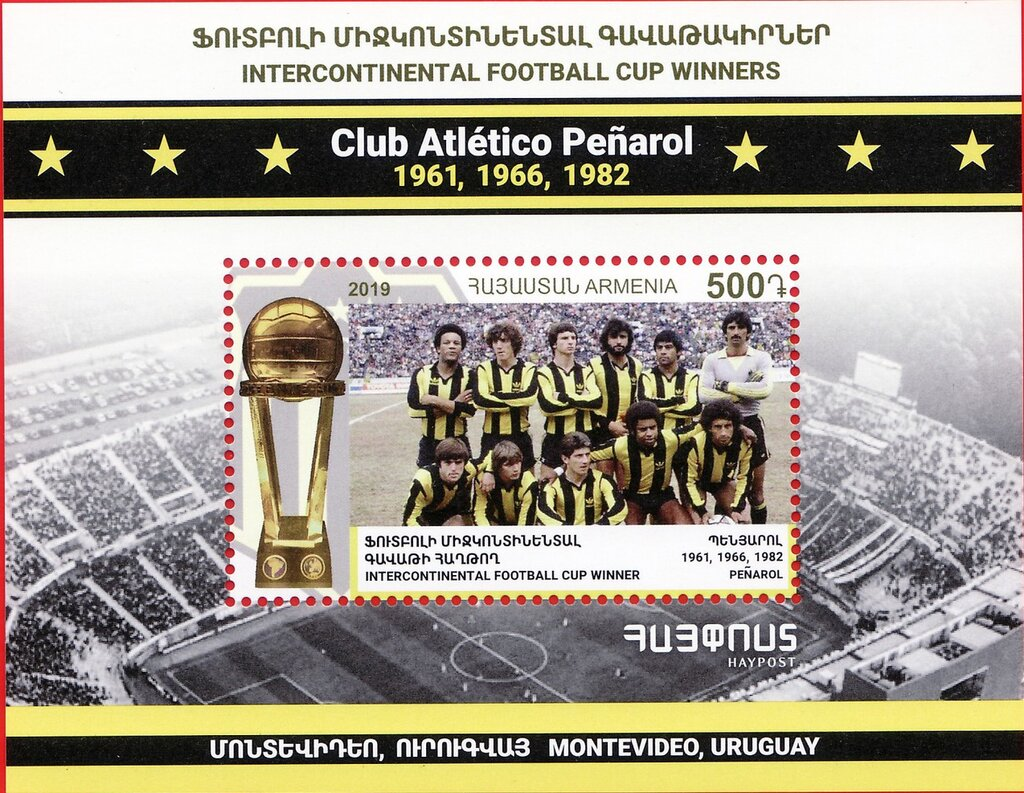
Armenian stamp honoring the 1982 Intercontinental Cup title won by Peñarol

=== Under-20 team ===
Type	Competition	Titles	Winning years
International (Cup)	U-20 Copa Libertadores	1	2022

=== South American Club of the Century ===
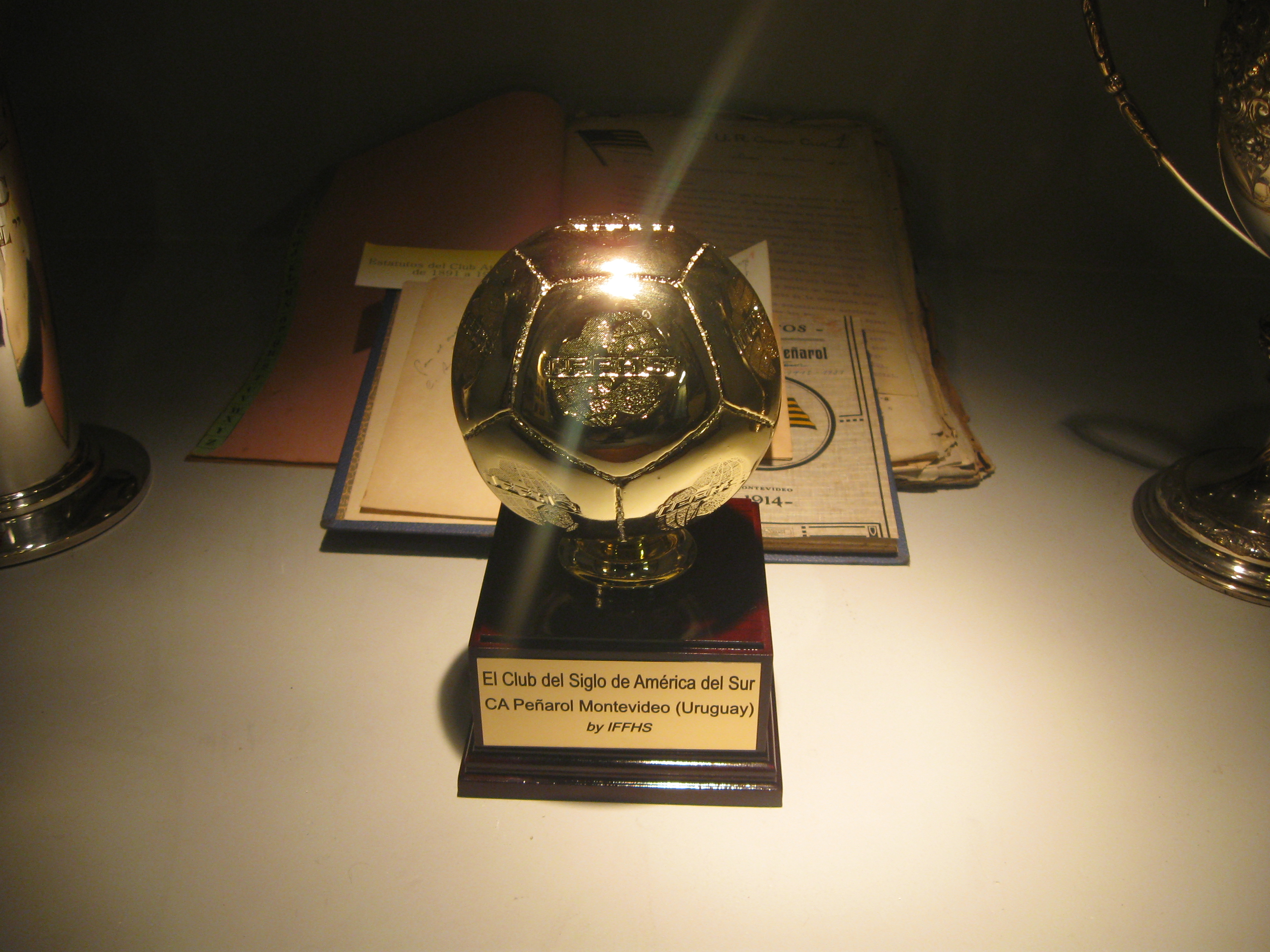
Trophy awarded by the IFFHS

In 2009, the International Federation of Football History & Statistics released a list of the best clubs of the 20th century on each continent. The organization awarded points for each victory in a quarterfinal or higher in international competition but only took into account games played after 1932 for the Professional era. Peñarol was the number-one team in South America, above Independiente of Argentina and arch-rivals Nacional.

Ten Best 20th-Century Clubs
Rank	Team	Country	Points
1	Peñarol	Uruguay	531
2	Independiente	Argentina	426.5
3	Nacional	Uruguay	414
4	River Plate	Argentina	404.25
5	Olimpia	Paraguay	337
6	Boca Juniors	Argentina	312
7	Cruzeiro	Brazil	295.5
8	São Paulo	Brazil	242
9	América de Cali	Colombia	220
10	Palmeiras	Brazil	213

== Other sports ==
=== Basketball ===
Peñarol's basketball records date back to the late 1920s, when Club Piratas was formed; in 1931, it became Peñarol. Its first league game (in the fourth division of Uruguayan basketball) was played in 1940. By 1943 the team, playing in the first division for Ramón Esnal, finished third. The following year Peñarol won the Federal Championship, a tournament attracting the best basketball teams in Montevideo; in 2003, the league changed its name to Liga Uruguaya de Basketball.

In 1945, Peñarol jumped from the Uruguayan Basketball Federation to play in a new league; when the upstart league failed, the club rejoined the federation in 1947. In 1952 Peñarol again won the Federal Championship, winning the Winter Tournament in 1953 and 1955. After a low period (with relegation in 1968), Peñarol won the Uruguayan Championship in 1973, 1978, and 1979;the latter was the first professional tournament in league history. In 1982 the club enjoyed its most successful season, winning the Federal Championship and the Winter Tournament The club also won the Campeonato Sudamericano de Clubes in 1983. In 1985 the club was relegated, beginning a downward spiral which ended with its expulsion from the league in 1997. However, the club rejoined in 2018 the Federación Uruguaya de Basket Ball, in the third tier.

=== Cycling ===
Peñarol has participated in the Vuelta Ciclista del Uruguay (Tour of Uruguay) since it began in 1939. Although the team rode well during its early years, it was not until the ninth edition (in 1952) that a Peñarol cyclist would win the race (Dante Sudatti, with an overall time of 48 hours, 38 minutes and 38 seconds). Peñarol cyclists also won the general classification 1953 and 1956; in the latter year, the club won the team championship.

After again winning the team championship in 1959, Peñarol would only win one individual championship in 1964. The team later improved, winning three individual titles in a row from 1989 to 1991 and the team victory in 1990 and 1991. 2002 was the fourth year that the club won both the individual and team classifications. Peñarol has competed in other road races, including José María Orlando's 1990 victory in the Rutas de América.

=== Futsal ===
Peñarol began playing futsal in 1968. During its first two decades, the club won on the national and international levels (including a victory in the 1987 World Interclub Championship). In 1995 FIFA took over the sport, and Peñarol began competing in AUF tournaments. The team won the first three Uruguayan Championships (1995, 1996, and 1997), also finishing at the top in 1999 and 2004. It won another three consecutive tournaments in 2010, 2011 and 2012.

=== Beach soccer ===
In January 2013 Peñarol inaugurated its beach soccer section. Diego Monserrat, goalkeeper of the Uruguay national team for many years, was the institution's first coach in this sport, while also goalkeeper Felipe Fernández was the club's first captain. In the second half of the same month, Peñarol won one of the three groups of five teams, that formed the qualification tournament to the "Super Liga", name given to the Uruguayan Championship of the discipline. After victories on quarterfinals and semi-finals, Peñarol was declared champion of the tournament without the need of a final, after the other semi-final was suspended.

=== Rugby ===
Peñarol have announced that they will form a rugby union section to compete in the inaugural 2020 season of Super Rugby Americas (previously Superliga Americana de Rugby), which started in February 2020. The first season was not completed due to the COVID-19 pandemic. Peñarol Rugby is currently the only representative of Uruguay in the competition. Since the first edition of Super Rugby Americas, home fixtures are played at the Estadio Charrúa in the Carrasco neighborhood of Montevideo. Estadio Charrúa is also home to the Uruguay national rugby union team, with several World Cup qualification and test matches being hosted here. The stadium has a seating capacity of 14,000.

Peñarol Rugby reached their first final in 2021, losing to Argentine side Jaguares XV 36–28. To date, Peñarol Rugby have won Super Rugby Americas three times, with their first title won in 2022 against Chilean side, Selknam, with a final score of 24–13. The 2023 edition also ended in a victory, with Peñarol winning against Argentine team Dogos XV 23–17. The 2025 final saw a repeat of the 2023 edition, with Peñarol securing the title against the Dogos XV with a final score of 35–34.

Several players within the current squad have earned caps for Los Teros, including current Peñarol captain Santiago Civetta as well as the current highest active capped player Mateo Sanguinetti.

=== Esports ===
Peñarol also has an esports division, with squads competing in League of Legends and FIFA leagues organized by the Uruguayan Virtual Football Association.

== See also ==
- Peñarol (basketball)
- Peñarol Rugby
- List of world champion football clubs
