= 1954 Campeonato Uruguayo Primera División =

51st season of the top-tier football league in Uruguay

Uruguayan Primera División
- Season: 1954
- Champions: Peñarol (20th. title)
- Matches: 90
- Goals: 264 (2.93 per match)

The 1954 Primera División Uruguaya was contested by 10 teams, and Peñarol won the championship.

== League standings ==
Pos	Team	Pld	W	D	L	GF	GA	GD	Pts
1	Peñarol	18	14	4	0	49	11	+38	32
2	Nacional	18	9	4	5	34	17	+17	22
3	Danubio	18	9	4	5	29	23	+6	22
4	Rampla Juniors	18	7	5	6	25	26	−1	19
5	Defensor	18	6	6	6	25	27	−2	18
6	Cerro	18	6	5	7	21	26	−5	17
7	Liverpool	18	5	7	6	25	34	−9	17
8	River Plate	18	4	8	6	20	29	−9	16
9	Montevideo Wanderers	18	2	6	10	17	29	−12	10
10	Miramar	18	1	5	12	19	42	−23	7

Source: rsssf.com
