= 1999 Campeonato Uruguayo Primera División =

96th season of the top-tier football league in Uruguay

Statistics of Primera División Uruguaya for the 1999 season.

== Overview ==
It was contested by 15 teams, and Peñarol won the championship.

== Apertura ==
Pos	Team	Pld	W	D	L	GF	GA	GD	Pts
1	Nacional	14	11	1	2	35	10	+25	34
2	Defensor Sporting	14	10	3	1	40	16	+24	33
3	Danubio	14	8	2	4	39	24	+15	26
4	Bella Vista	14	7	5	2	25	15	+10	26
5	Peñarol	14	7	4	3	24	13	+11	25
6	Cerro	14	7	0	7	24	30	−6	21
7	Rentistas	14	4	5	5	15	14	+1	17
8	Huracán Buceo	14	4	5	5	17	27	−10	17
9	Deportivo Maldonado	14	4	4	6	22	25	−3	16
10	River Plate	14	4	4	6	14	21	−7	16
11	Frontera Rivera	14	3	4	7	16	20	−4	13
12	Tacuarembó	14	4	1	9	12	23	−11	13
13	Paysandú Bella Vista	14	3	4	7	9	21	−12	13
14	Rampla Juniors	14	3	2	9	9	25	−16	11
15	Liverpool	14	0	8	6	5	22	−17	8

Source: rsssf.com

== Clausura ==
Pos	Team	Pld	W	D	L	GF	GA	GD	Pts
1	Peñarol	14	12	2	0	47	12	+35	38
2	Nacional	14	9	2	3	30	17	+13	29
3	Danubio	14	8	4	2	25	16	+9	28
4	Defensor Sporting	14	7	4	3	20	14	+6	25
5	Huracán Buceo	14	7	3	4	17	17	0	24
6	Liverpool	14	5	5	4	18	12	+6	20
7	River Plate	14	5	5	4	22	21	+1	20
8	Bella Vista	14	5	4	5	21	23	−2	19
9	Frontera Rivera	14	5	2	7	23	22	+1	17
10	Cerro	14	4	4	6	13	17	−4	16
11	Paysandú Bella Vista	14	3	6	5	16	26	−10	15
12	Rampla Juniors	14	5	0	9	19	31	−12	15
13	Deportivo Maldonado	14	3	5	6	17	29	−12	14
14	Tacuarembó	14	0	4	10	8	20	−12	4
15	Rentistas	14	0	4	10	8	27	−19	4

Source: rsssf.com

== Overall ==
Pos	Team	Pld	W	D	L	GF	GA	GD	Pts
1	Peñarol	28	19	6	3	71	25	+46	63
2	Nacional	28	20	3	5	65	27	+38	63
3	Defensor Sporting	28	17	7	4	60	30	+30	58
4	Danubio	28	16	6	6	64	40	+24	54
5	Bella Vista	28	12	9	7	46	38	+8	45
6	Huracán Buceo	28	11	8	9	34	44	−10	41
7	Cerro	28	11	4	13	37	47	−10	37
8	River Plate	28	9	9	10	36	42	−6	36
9	Frontera Rivera	28	8	6	14	39	42	−3	30
10	Deportivo Maldonado	28	7	9	12	39	54	−15	30
11	Liverpool	28	5	13	10	23	34	−11	28
12	Paysandú Bella Vista	28	6	10	12	25	47	−22	28
13	Rampla Juniors	28	8	2	18	28	56	−28	26
14	Rentistas	28	4	9	15	23	41	−18	21
15	Tacuarembó	28	4	5	19	20	43	−23	17

Source: rsssf.com

== Playoff ==
- Peñarol 1–1; 1–1; 2–1 Nacional

Peñarol won the championship.
