= 1981 Campeonato Uruguayo Primera División =

78th season of the top-tier football league in Uruguay

Statistics of Primera División Uruguaya for the 1981 season.

== Overview ==
It was contested by 15 teams, and Peñarol won the championship.

== League standings ==
Pos	Team	Pld	W	D	L	GF	GA	GD	Pts
1	Peñarol	28	19	6	3	63	25	+38	44
2	Nacional	28	17	7	4	61	35	+26	41
3	Montevideo Wanderers	28	11	13	4	37	27	+10	35
4	Bella Vista	28	10	12	6	39	30	+9	32
5	River Plate	28	9	13	6	38	34	+4	31
6	Defensor	28	11	8	9	41	37	+4	30
7	Miramar Misiones	28	9	12	7	36	33	+3	30
8	Huracán Buceo	28	7	14	7	32	33	−1	28
9	Cerro	28	7	11	10	37	38	−1	25
10	Rampla Juniors	28	6	11	11	23	40	−17	23
11	Liverpool	28	7	9	12	22	43	−21	23
12	Danubio	28	6	9	13	38	39	−1	21
13	Progreso	28	5	11	12	31	51	−20	21
14	Sud América	28	5	10	13	28	39	−11	20
15	Fénix	28	4	8	16	29	51	−22	16

Source: rsssf.com
