= 1997 Campeonato Uruguayo Primera División =

94th season of the top-tier football league in Uruguay

Statistics of Primera División Uruguaya for the 1997 season.

== Overview ==
It was contested by 12 teams, and Peñarol won the championship.

== Apertura ==
Pos	Team	Pld	W	D	L	GF	GA	GD	Pts
1	Nacional	11	8	1	2	26	11	+15	25
2	River Plate	11	6	4	1	24	14	+10	22
3	Peñarol	11	6	3	2	22	11	+11	21
4	Defensor Sporting	11	6	2	3	20	11	+9	20
5	Liverpool	11	5	4	2	15	13	+2	19
6	Rampla Juniors	11	4	2	5	12	18	−6	14
7	Montevideo Wanderers	11	3	4	4	12	13	−1	13
8	Huracán Buceo	11	4	1	6	15	19	−4	13
9	Danubio	11	4	1	6	10	14	−4	13
10	Rentistas	11	2	2	7	4	19	−15	8
11	Cerro	11	1	4	6	8	15	−7	7
12	Racing Montevideo	11	1	4	6	8	18	−10	7

Source: rsssf.com

== Clausura ==
Pos	Team	Pld	W	D	L	GF	GA	GD	Pts
1	Defensor Sporting	11	7	3	1	16	9	+7	24
2	Peñarol	11	7	2	2	29	13	+16	23
3	River Plate	11	6	1	4	12	11	+1	19
4	Liverpool	11	4	6	1	15	13	+2	18
5	Cerro	11	4	3	4	16	13	+3	15
6	Nacional	11	4	3	4	20	18	+2	15
7	Huracán Buceo	11	4	3	4	12	13	−1	15
8	Rentistas	11	4	2	5	10	18	−8	14
9	Montevideo Wanderers	11	3	3	5	9	13	−4	12
10	Racing Montevideo	11	3	3	5	14	19	−5	12
11	Rampla Juniors	11	2	3	6	10	14	−4	9
12	Danubio	11	0	4	7	13	22	−9	4

Source: rsssf.com

== Overall ==
Pos	Team	Pld	W	D	L	GF	GA	GD	Pts
1	Peñarol	22	13	5	4	51	24	+27	44
2	Defensor Sporting	22	13	5	4	36	20	+16	44
3	River Plate	22	12	5	5	36	25	+11	41
4	Nacional	22	12	4	6	46	29	+17	40
5	Liverpool	22	9	10	3	30	26	+4	37
6	Huracán Buceo	22	8	4	10	27	32	−5	28
7	Montevideo Wanderers	22	6	7	9	21	26	−5	25
8	Rampla Juniors	22	6	5	11	22	32	−10	23
9	Cerro	22	5	7	10	24	28	−4	22
10	Rentistas	22	6	4	12	14	37	−23	22
11	Racing Montevideo	22	4	7	11	22	37	−15	19
12	Danubio	22	4	5	13	23	36	−13	17

Source: rsssf.com

== Playoff ==
=== Semifinal ===
- Peñarol 3-2 Nacional

=== Final ===
- Peñarol 1-0 ; 3-0 Defensor Sporting

Peñarol won the championship.
