= Torneo del Consejo Provisorio =

1926 season of the Uruguayan Primera División

Primera División (CP) Serie A
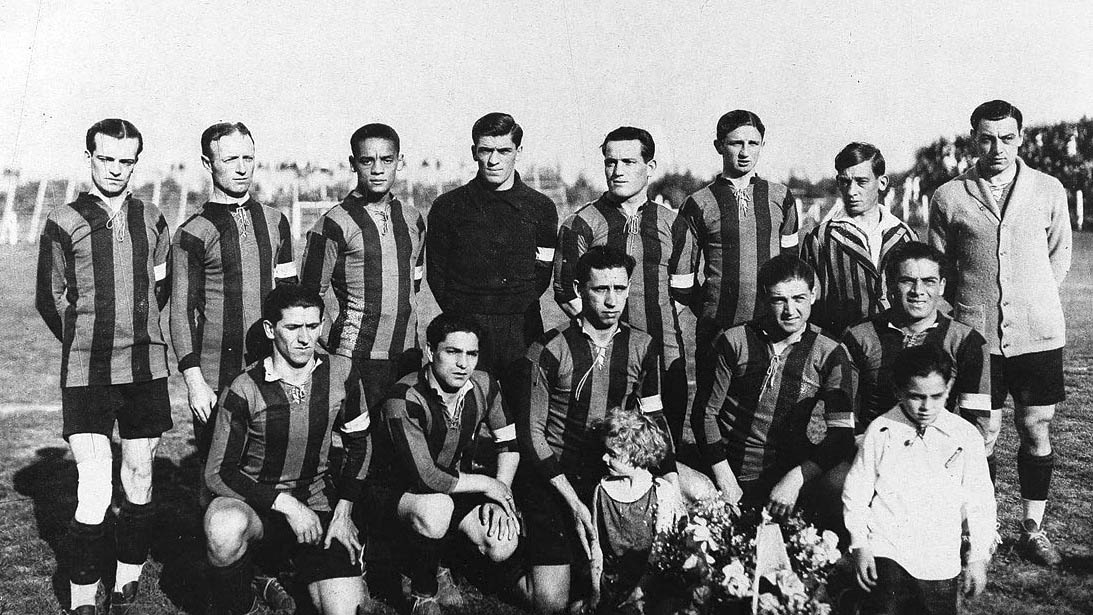
- Peñarol, champions
- Season: 1926
- Champions: Peñarol
- Promoted: (None)
- Relegated: (None)
- Matches: 90
- Goals: 253 (2.81 per match)

The Torneo del Consejo Provisorio was a football championship organised by an Interim Council ("Consejo Provisorio") in 1926. It was a transitional tournament after the schism of Uruguayan football in 1922, when the Federación Uruguaya de Football (FUF) was established as a dissident body from official Uruguayan Football Association (AUF). Peñarol was the champion.

== History ==
After the schism of 1922, Central and Peñarol were disaffiliated from the association. Both associations, FUF and AUF, organised their own tournaments separately. With several attempts to reunification failed, the Government of Uruguay intervened to solve the problem and as a result, the AUF decided not to hold a championship in 1925.

As the situation had not significantly changed in 1926, the AUF did not organise an official championship either. With the purpose of joining both associations, AUF and FUF, the National Government established a provisional championship, named "Héctor R. Gómez", to be played in two series.

It was played in two groups, "serie A", with all the clubs of Primera División (with the exception of Charley and Dublin, that had left the league some time ago). It was also stated that all of them would play the 1927 Primera División championship. On the other hand, the "serie B" included the rest of the teams of both associations. The ten clubs best placed at the end of the tournament, would qualify to play the 1927 Primera División season with the other 10 clubs of serie A.

As the AUF didn't organise the Consejo Provisorio championship, the association has not recognised it as official.

== League standings ==
Pos	Team	Pld	W	D	L	GF	GA	GD	Pts
1	Peñarol	18	13	5	0	27	5	+22	31
2	Montevideo Wanderers	18	11	3	4	35	17	+18	25
3	Rampla Juniors	18	12	1	5	29	14	+15	25
4	Nacional	18	11	2	5	36	16	+20	24
5	Lito	18	10	4	4	42	20	+22	24
6	Central	18	8	2	8	24	25	−1	18
7	Liverpool	18	5	3	10	16	25	−9	13
8	Belgrano	18	4	2	12	19	32	−13	10
9	Uruguay Onward	18	3	2	13	15	45	−30	8
10	Universal	18	1	0	17	10	54	−44	2

Source: rsssf.com
