= 1953 Campeonato Uruguayo Primera División =

50th season of the top-tier football league in Uruguay

Uruguayan Primera División
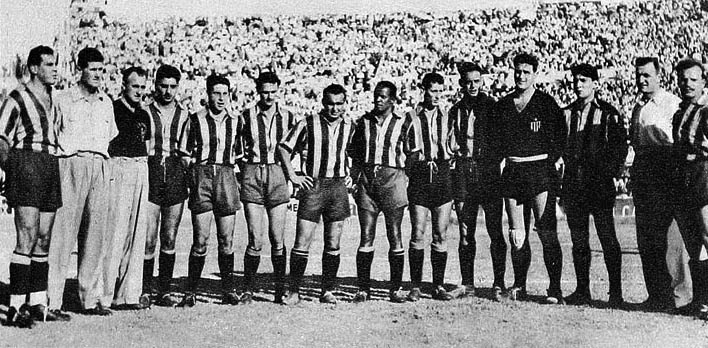
- Peñarol, champions
- Season: 1953 (49th)
- Champions: Peñarol

Statistics of Primera División Uruguaya for the 1953 season.

== Overview ==
It was contested by 10 teams, and Peñarol won the championship.

== League standings ==
Pos	Team	Pld	W	D	L	GF	GA	GD	Pts
1	Peñarol	18	15	2	1	59	13	+46	32
2	Nacional	18	9	7	2	34	21	+13	25
3	Rampla Juniors	18	9	4	5	30	21	+9	22
4	River Plate	18	7	5	6	28	31	−3	19
5	Defensor	18	6	6	6	32	34	−2	18
6	Danubio	18	5	6	7	25	25	0	16
7	Liverpool	18	5	5	8	27	33	−6	15
8	Montevideo Wanderers	18	5	5	8	26	35	−9	15
9	Cerro	18	4	4	10	14	31	−17	12
10	Central	18	2	2	14	15	46	−31	6

Source: rsssf.com
