= 1995 Campeonato Uruguayo Primera División =

92nd season of the top-tier football league in Uruguay

Statistics of Primera División Uruguaya for the 1995 season.

== Overview ==
It was contested by 13 teams, and Peñarol won the championship.

== Apertura ==
Pos	Team	Pld	W	D	L	GF	GA	GD	Pts
1	Peñarol	12	8	3	1	29	9	+20	25 (Note: 2 points deducted?)
2	Liverpool	12	8	1	3	23	9	+14	25
3	Nacional	12	8	2	2	24	16	+8	24
4	Defensor Sporting	12	6	3	3	18	15	+3	21
5	Central Español	12	5	4	3	18	15	+3	19
6	Montevideo Wanderers	12	5	3	4	13	12	+1	18
7	Cerro	12	4	4	4	19	14	+5	16
8	Sud América	12	3	6	3	11	10	+1	15
9	River Plate	12	3	5	4	13	10	+3	14
10	Danubio	12	2	4	6	9	24	−15	10
11	Progreso	12	1	5	6	10	17	−7	8
12	Rampla Juniors	12	1	3	8	11	32	−21	6
13	Basáñez	12	0	5	7	9	24	−15	5

== Clausura ==
Pos	Team	Pld	W	D	L	GF	GA	GD	Pts
1	Nacional	12	8	3	1	29	13	+16	27
2	Peñarol	12	8	3	1	20	9	+11	27
3	Rampla Juniors	12	6	3	3	15	18	−3	21
4	River Plate	12	4	6	2	15	8	+7	18
5	Danubio	12	3	8	1	16	13	+3	17
6	Defensor Sporting	12	3	5	4	10	11	−1	14
7	Liverpool	12	2	8	2	11	11	0	14
8	Basáñez	12	3	4	5	16	20	−4	13
9	Montevideo Wanderers	12	4	1	7	11	20	−9	13
10	Progreso	12	2	4	6	13	18	−5	10
11	Cerro	12	2	4	6	14	20	−6	10
12	Central Español	12	1	7	4	13	16	−3	10
13	Sud América	12	1	6	5	8	14	−6	9

== Overall ==
Pos	Team	Pld	W	D	L	GF	GA	GD	Pts
1	Peñarol	24	16	6	2	49	18	+31	54
2	Nacional	24	16	5	3	53	29	+24	53
3	Liverpool	24	10	9	5	34	20	+14	39
4	Defensor Sporting	24	9	8	7	28	26	+2	35
5	River Plate	24	7	11	6	28	18	+10	32
6	Montevideo Wanderers	24	9	4	11	24	32	−8	31
7	Central Español	24	6	11	7	31	31	0	29
8	Danubio	24	5	12	7	25	37	−12	27
9	Rampla Juniors	24	7	6	11	26	50	−24	27
10	Cerro	24	6	8	10	33	34	−1	26
11	Sud América	24	4	12	8	19	24	−5	24
12	Progreso	24	3	9	12	23	35	−12	18
13	Basáñez	24	3	9	12	25	44	−19	18

Source: rsssf.com

== Playoff ==
- Peñarol 1-0 ; 1-2 ; 3-1 Nacional

Peñarol won the championship.
