= Juan Carlos Corazzo =

Uruguayan footballer and manager (1907–1986)

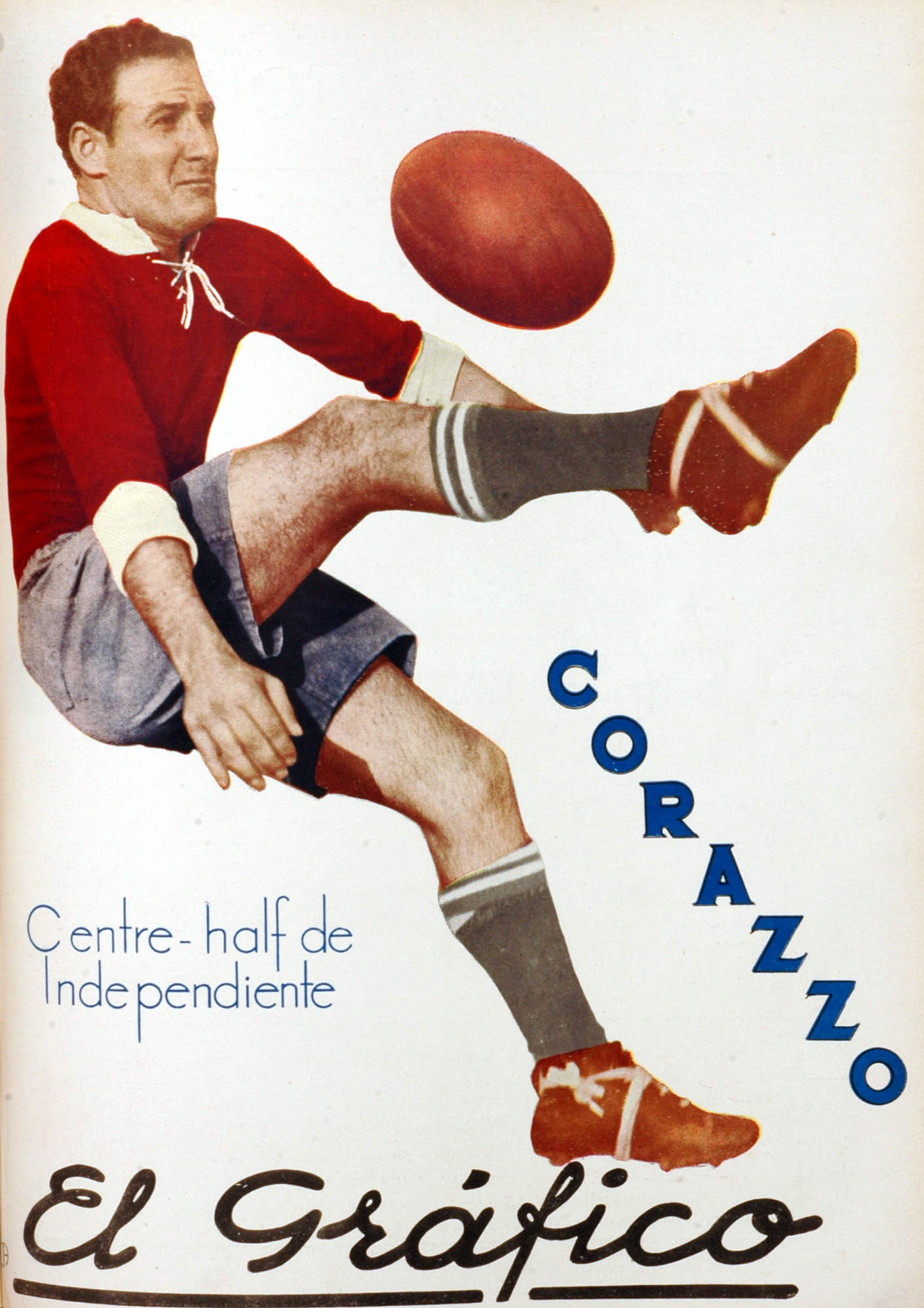

Personal information
- Date of birth: 14 December 1907
- Date of death: 12 January 1986 (aged 78)
- Positions: Defender; midfielder

Senior career*
Years	Team	Apps	(Gls)
1924–1925	Montevideo Wanderers		
1925–1930	Sud América		
1931	Racing Club	1	(0)
1932–1937	Independiente	191	(6)
Total		192+	(6+)

International career
1928	Uruguay	2	(0)

Managerial career
- 1954–1955: Danubio
- 1955: Uruguay
- 1957: Danubio
- 1959–1961: Uruguay
- 1962–1964: Uruguay
- 1967: Uruguay
- 1969: Danubio
- * Club domestic league appearances and goals

Juan Carlos Corazzo (14 December 1907 – 12 January 1986) was a Uruguayan football player and coach.

== Playing career ==
Born in Montevideo, Corazzo played as a defender and midfielder for Montevideo Wanderers, Sud América, Racing Club and Independiente. He also played two matches for Uruguay in 1928.

== Coaching career ==
Corazzo later managed Uruguay at the 1962 FIFA World Cup.

Corazzo held the Uruguay national football team record for most consecutive games without loss from 1967 to 1968 (14 games), until Óscar Tabárez surpassed it with 18 consecutive games between 2011 and 2012.

He also managed Danubio.

== Personal life ==
He is the grandfather of Diego Forlán and father-in-law of Pablo Forlán.
