= 1964 Copa Libertadores finals =

1964 Copa de Campeones finals
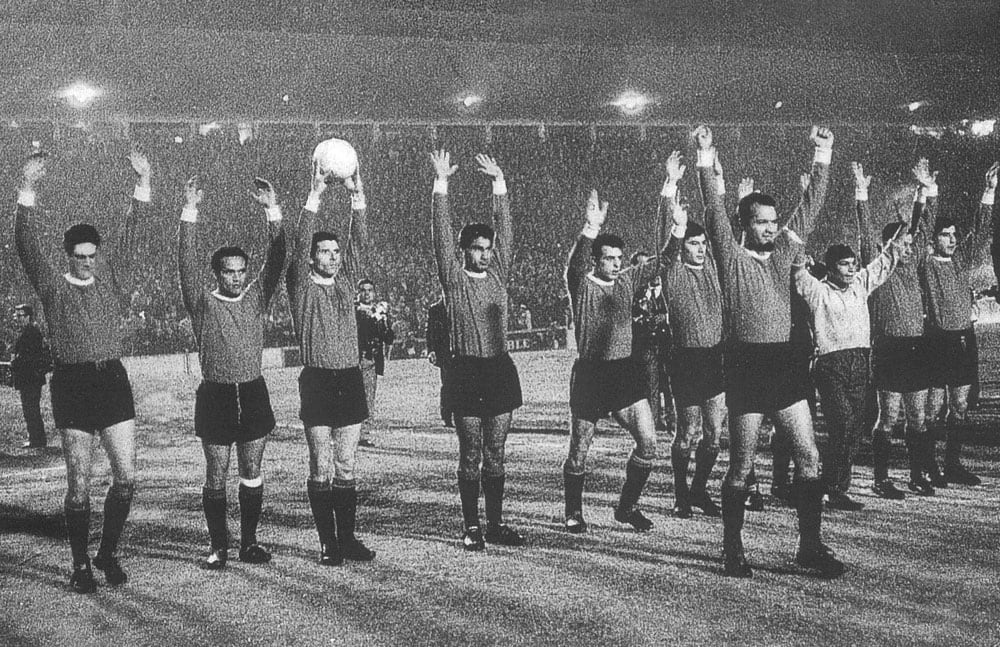
- Independiente, champions
- Event: 1964 Copa de Campeones de América
Nacional	Independiente
(Uruguay)	(Argentina)
0	1
- Independiente won 1-3 on points.

First leg
Nacional	Independiente
0	0
- Date: August 6, 1964
- Venue: Estadio Centenario, Montevideo
- Referee: Leo Horn (Netherlands)
- Attendance: 60,000

Second leg
Independiente	Nacional
1	0
- Date: August 12, 1964
- Venue: Independiente Stadium, Avellaneda
- Referee: Dimas Larrosa (Paraguay)
- Attendance: 80,000

The 1964 Copa Libertadores finals was a football series between Argentine team Independiente and Uruguayan team Nacional on August 6 and 12 of this same year. It was the fifth final of South America's most prestigious football competition, the Copa de Campeones (known in the modern era as "Copa Libertadores").

Both teams played the Copa Libertadores finals for the first time in their history.

== Qualified teams ==
Team	Previous finals app.
(Uruguay) Nacional	None
(Argentina) Independiente	None

== Venues ==
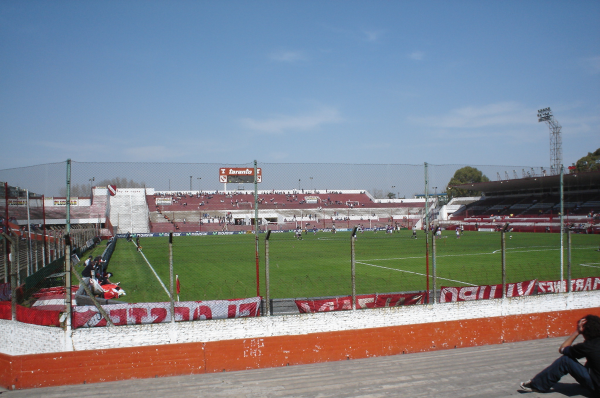
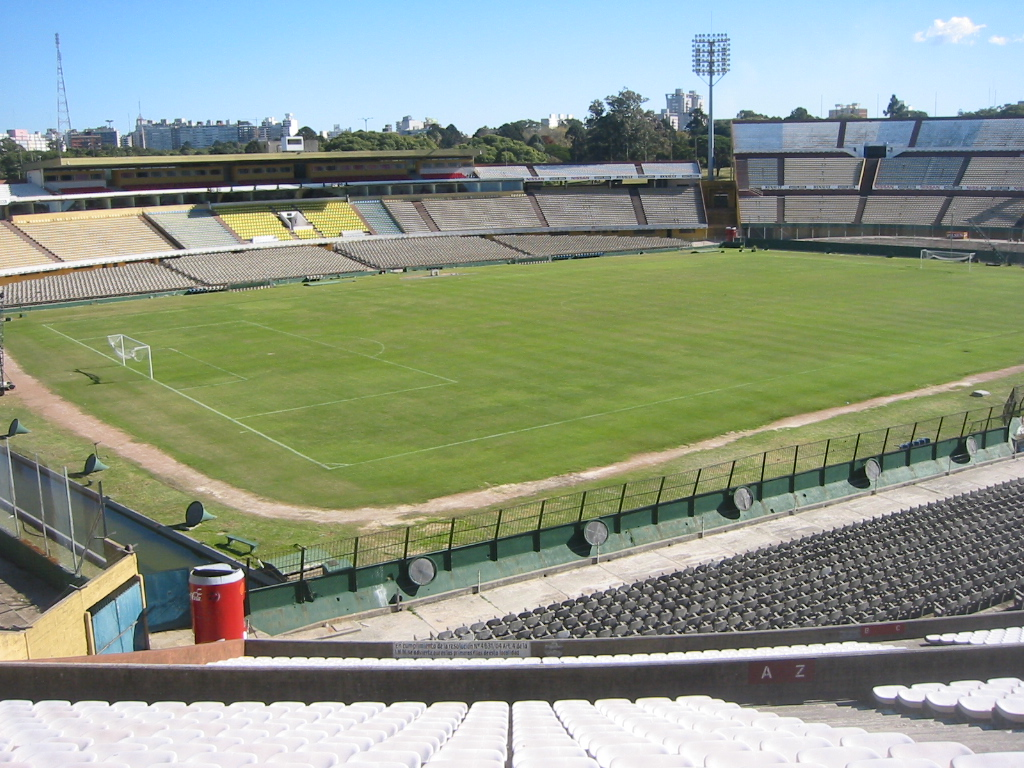
Independiente and Centenario stadiums were the venues for the finals

== Match details ==
=== First leg ===
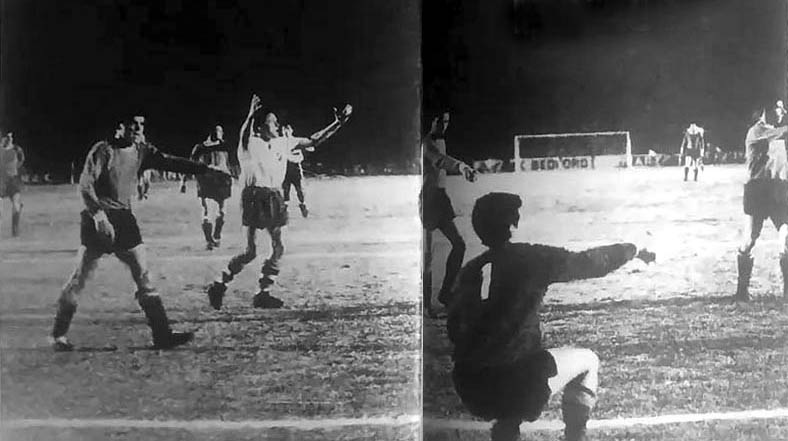
A moment of the first match held in Montevideo

1964 Copa Libertadores finals
August 6, 1964
First leg

Nacional (Uruguay)	0–0	(Argentina) Independiente

Estadio Centenario, Montevideo
Attendance: 60,000
Referee: Leo Horn (Netherlands)

Nacional	Independiente

GK	(Uruguay) Roberto Sosa
DF	(Uruguay) Elgar Baeza
DF	(Uruguay) Emilio Alvarez
DF	(Uruguay) Luis Ramos
DF	(Uruguay) Eliseo Álvarez
MF	(Uruguay) Mario Méndez
MF	(Uruguay) Domingo Pérez
FW	(Uruguay) Vladas Douksas
FW	(Brazil) Jaburú
FW	(Uruguay) Sergio Arias
FW	(Uruguay) José Urruzmendi
Manager:
(Brazil) Zezé Moreira

GK	(Argentina) Miguel Ángel Santoro
DF	(Argentina) Héctor Zerrillo
DF	(Uruguay) Tomás Rolan
DF	(Argentina) Roberto Ferreiro
DF	(Argentina) David Acevedo
MF	(Argentina) Jorge Maldonado
MF	(Argentina) Raúl Bernao
FW	(Argentina) Osvaldo Mura
FW	(Argentina) Luis Suárez
FW	(Argentina) Mario Rodríguez
FW	(Argentina) Raúl Savoy
Manager:
(Argentina) Manuel Giúdice

=== Second leg ===
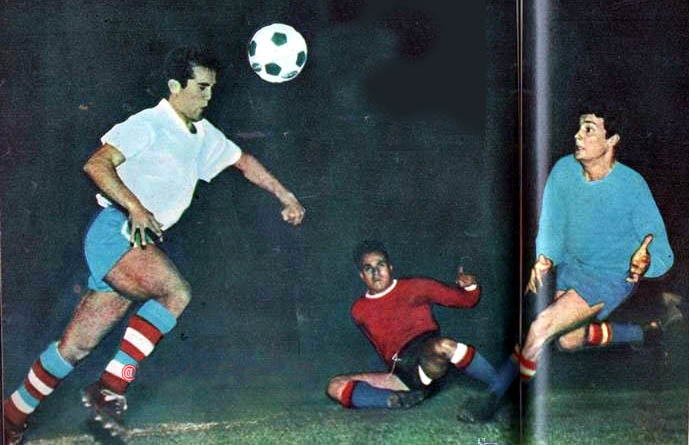
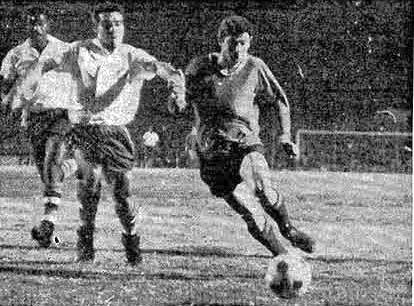
Some moments of the match in Avellaneda
August 12, 1964
Second leg

Independiente (Argentina)	1–0	(Uruguay) Nacional
M. Rodríguez 31'

Independiente Stadium, Avellaneda
Attendance: 80,000
Referee: Dimas Larrosa (Paraguay)

Independiente	Nacional

GK	(Argentina) Miguel Ángel Santoro
DF	(Argentina) Juan C. Guzmán
DF	(Uruguay) Tomás Rolan
DF	(Argentina) Roberto Ferreiro
DF	(Argentina) David Acevedo
MF	(Argentina) Jorge Maldonado
MF	(Argentina) Raúl Bernao
FW	(Argentina) Pedro Prospitti
FW	(Argentina) Luis Suárez
FW	(Argentina) Mario Rodríguez
FW	(Argentina) Raúl Savoy
Manager:
(Argentina) Manuel Giúdice

GK	(Uruguay) Roberto Sosa
DF	(Uruguay) Elgar Baeza
DF	(Uruguay) Emilio Alvarez
DF	(Uruguay) Luis Ramos
DF	(Uruguay) Eliseo Álvarez
MF	(Uruguay) Mario Méndez
MF	(Uruguay) Jorge Oyarbide
FW	(Uruguay) Vladas Douksas
FW	(Brazil) Jaburú
FW	(Uruguay) Domingo Pérez
FW	(Uruguay) José Urruzmendi
Manager:
(Brazil) Zezé Moreira
