= 1965 Copa Libertadores finals =

1965 Copa de Campeones finals
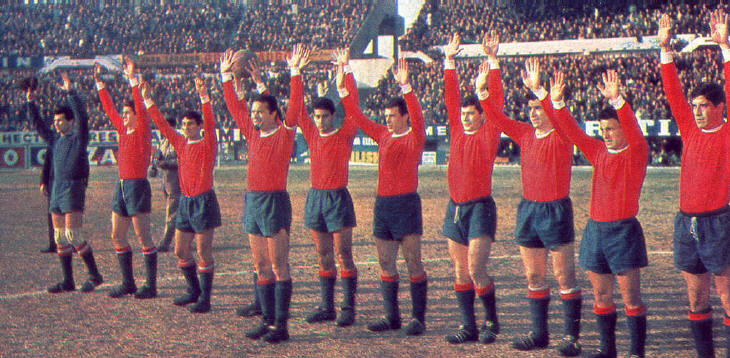
- Team of Independiente, champions
- Event: 1965 Copa de Campeones de América
Independiente	Peñarol
(Argentina)	(Uruguay)
- 2–2 on points Independiente won after a play-off

First leg
Independiente	Peñarol
1	0
- Date: 9 April 1965
- Venue: Independiente Stadium, Avellaneda
- Referee: Arturo Yamasaki (Peru)
- Attendance: 45,000

Second leg
Peñarol	Independiente
3	1
- Date: 12 April 1965
- Venue: Estadio Centenario, Montevideo
- Referee: Arturo Yamasaki (Peru)
- Attendance: 45,000

Play-off
Peñarol	Independiente
1	4
- Date: 15 April 1965
- Venue: Estadio Nacional, Santiago
- Referee: Arturo Yamasaki (Peru)
- Attendance: 40,000

The 1965 Copa Libertadores finals was a football series between Argentine team Independiente and Uruguayan team Peñarol on 6 and 12 April of that same year. It was the sixth final of South America's most prestigious football competition, the Copa Libertadores.

After both teams won one match each, a playoff was played on 15 April, being won by Independiente by 4–1 at Estadio Nacional in Santiago de Chile. Therefore the Diablos Rojos won their 2nd Copa Libertadores title.

== Qualified teams ==
Team	Previous finals appearances (bold indicates winners)
(Argentina) Independiente	**1964**
(Uruguay) Peñarol	**1960**, **1961**, 1962

== Venues ==
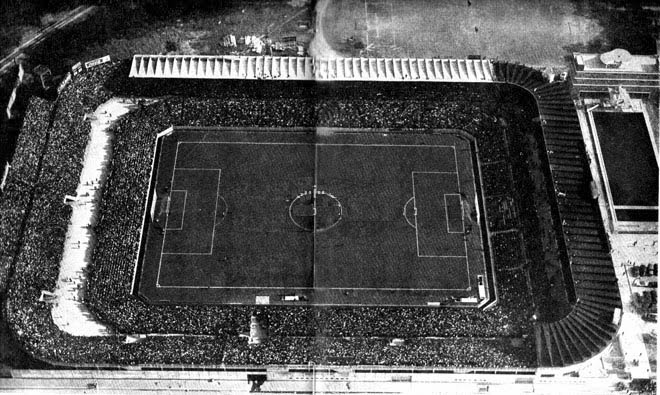
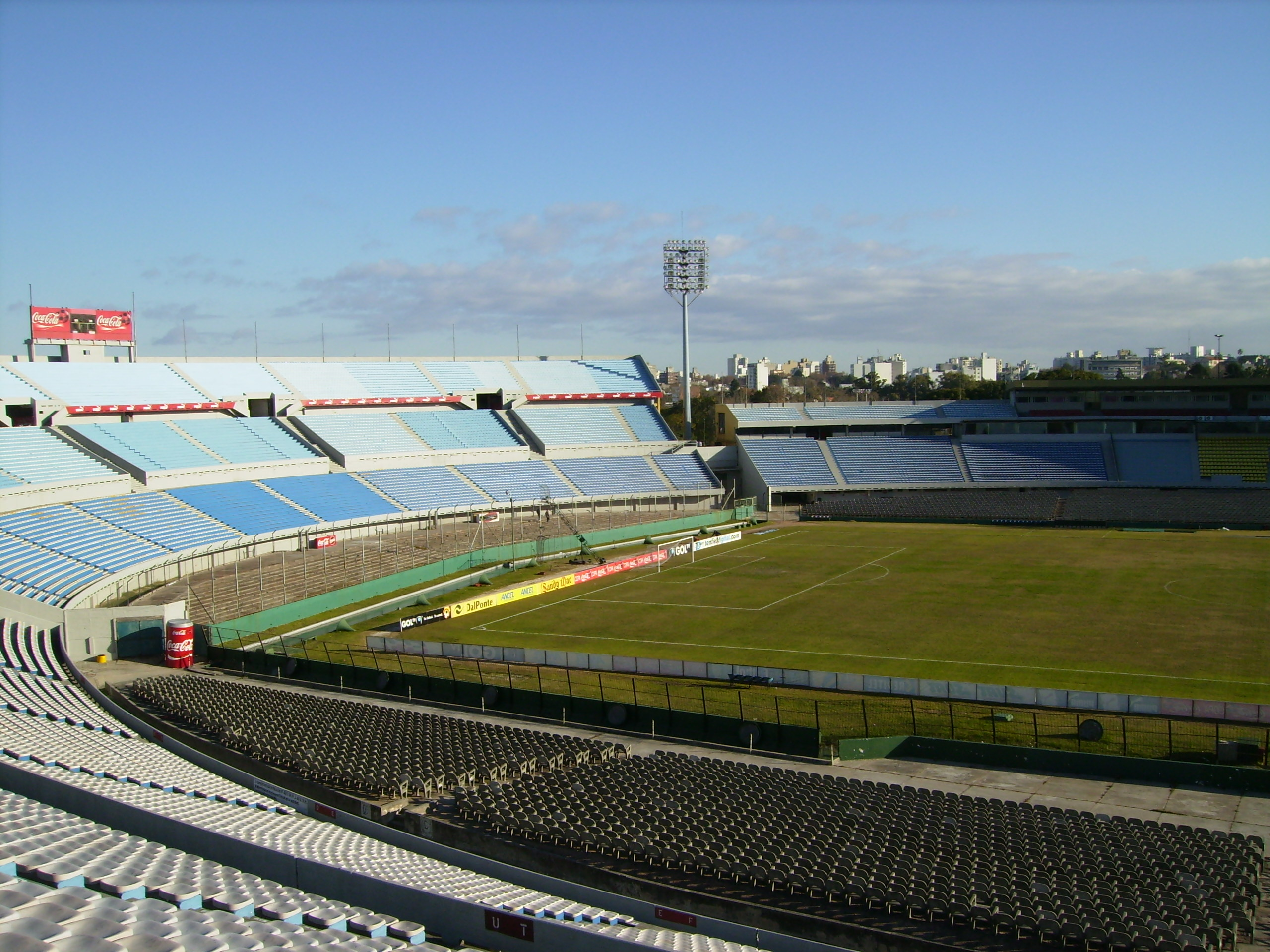
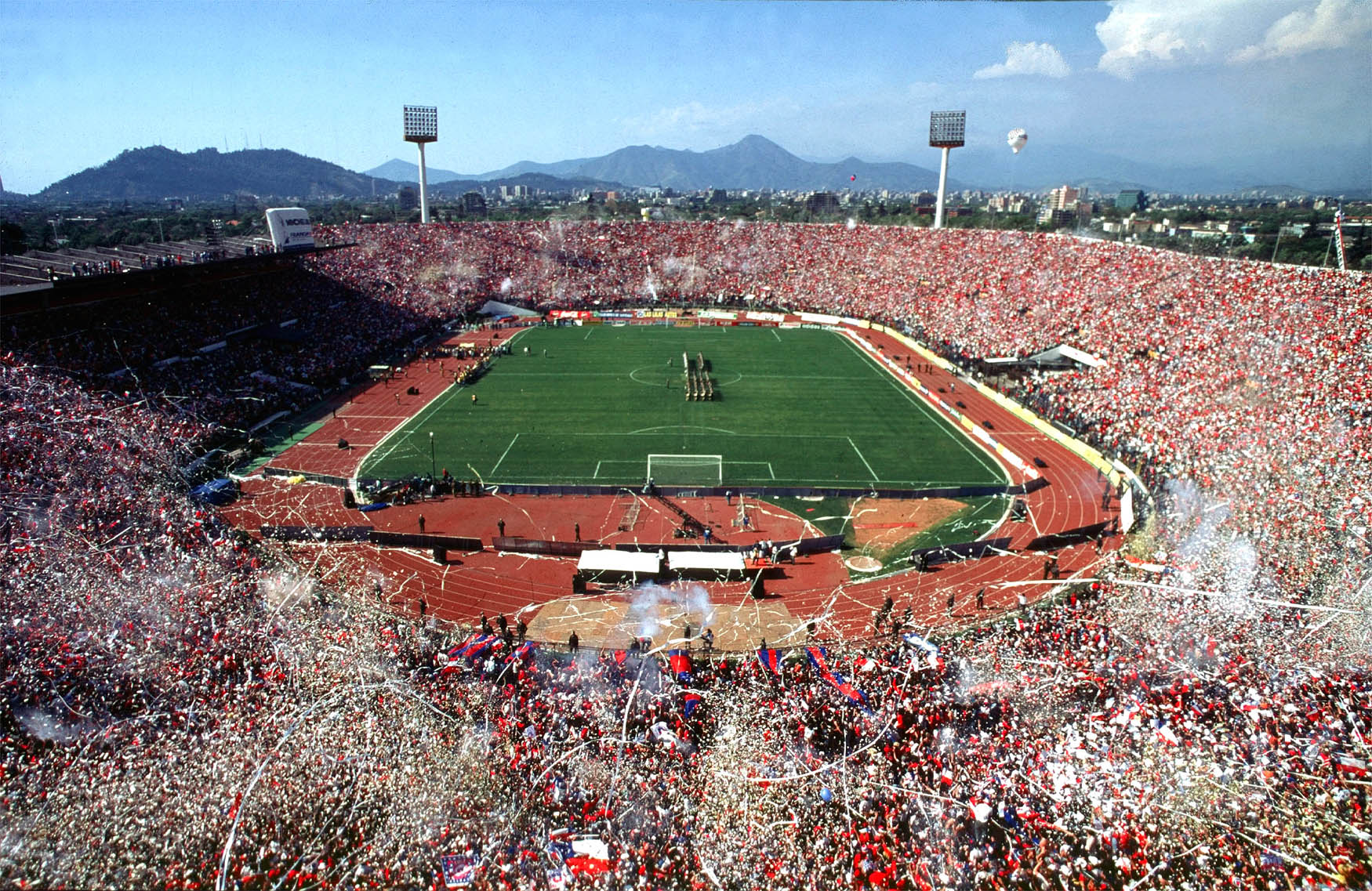
Estadio de Independiente, Estadio Centenario, and Estadio Nacional, venues

== Match details ==
=== First leg ===
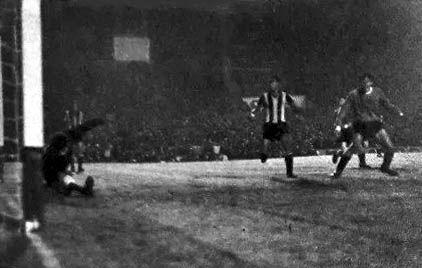
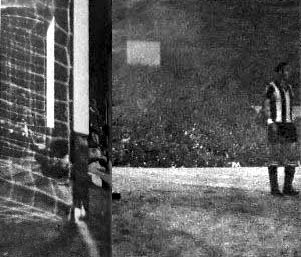
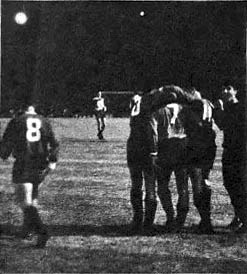
Some moments of the first leg, held in Avellaneda
1965 Copa Libertadores finals
9 April 1965
First leg

Independiente (Argentina)	1–0	(Uruguay) Peñarol
Bernao 83'	Report

Independiente Stadium, Avellaneda
Attendance: 45,000
Referee: Yamasaki (Peru)

**Independiente**	**Peñarol**

GK	1	(Argentina) Miguel Ángel Santoro
DF	2	(Argentina) Rubén Navarro (c)
DF	3	(Argentina) Raúl Decaria
MF	4	(Argentina) Roberto Ferreiro
MF	5	(Argentina) David Acevedo
MF	6	(Argentina) Juan C. Guzmán
FW	7	(Argentina) Rául Bernao
FW	8	(Argentina) Osvaldo Mura
FW	9	(Argentina) Luis Suárez	Substituted off
FW	10	(Argentina) Roque Avallay
FW	11	(Argentina) Raúl Savoy
Substitutes:
MF		(Argentina) Vicente de la Mata, Jr.	Substituted on
Manager:
(Argentina) Manuel Giúdice

GK	1	(Uruguay) Ladislao Mazurkiewicz
DF	2	(Uruguay) Carlos Pérez
DF	3	(Uruguay) Luis Varela (c)
MF	4	(Uruguay) Pablo Forlán
MF	5	(Uruguay) Néstor Gonçalves
MF	6	(Uruguay) Omar Caetano
FW	7	(Uruguay) Ernesto Ledesma
FW	8	(Uruguay) Pedro Rocha
FW	9	(Uruguay) Héctor Silva
FW	10	(Uruguay) José Sasía
FW	11	(Peru) Juan Joya
Manager:
(Uruguay) Roque Máspoli

=== Second leg ===
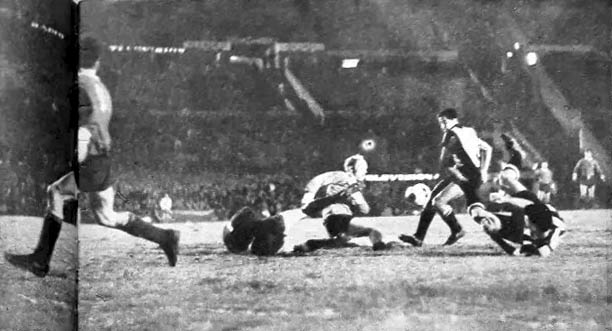
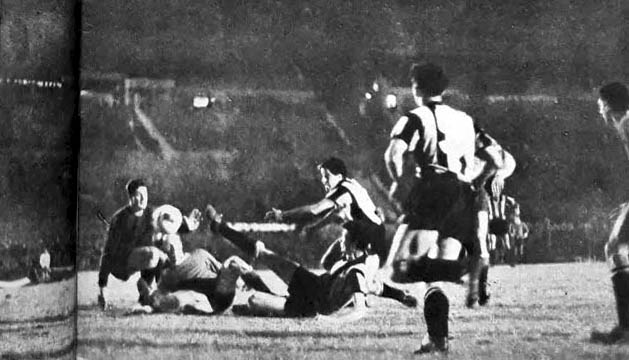
Some moments of the match held in Montevideo
12 April 1965

Peñarol (Uruguay)	3–1	(Argentina) Independiente
Gonçalves 14'; Reznik 43'; Rocha 46'		De la Mata, Jr. 88'

Centenario, Montevideo
Attendance: 45,000
Referee: Yamasaki (Peru)

**Peñarol**	**Independiente**

GK	1	(Uruguay) Ladislao Mazurkiewicz
DF	2	(Uruguay) Carlos Pérez
DF	3	(Uruguay) Luis Varela
MF	4	(Uruguay) Pablo Forlán	Substituted off
MF	5	(Uruguay) Néstor Gonçalves
MF	6	(Uruguay) Omar Caetano
FW	7	(Uruguay) Ernesto Ledesma
FW	8	(Uruguay) Pedro Rocha
FW	9	(Uruguay) Héctor Silva
FW	10	(Uruguay) José Sasía
FW	11	(Peru) Juan Joya
Substitutes:
		(Uruguay) Miguel Reznik	Substituted on
Manager:
(Uruguay) Roque Máspoli

GK	1	(Argentina) Miguel Ángel Santoro
DF	2	(Argentina) Rubén Navarro (c)
DF	3	(Argentina) José Paflik
MF	4	(Argentina) Roberto Ferreiro
MF	5	(Argentina) David Acevedo
MF	6	(Argentina) Juan C. Guzmán
FW	7	(Argentina) Rául Bernao
FW	8	(Argentina) Osvaldo Mura
FW	9	(Argentina) Luis Suárez
FW	10	(Argentina) Roque Avallay	Substituted off
FW	11	(Argentina) Raúl Savoy
Substitutes:
		(Argentina) Vicente de la Mata, Jr.	Substituted on
Manager:
(Argentina) Manuel Giúdice

=== Playoff ===
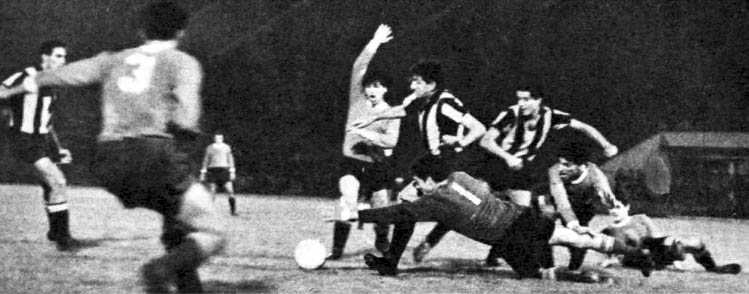
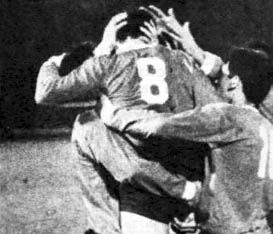
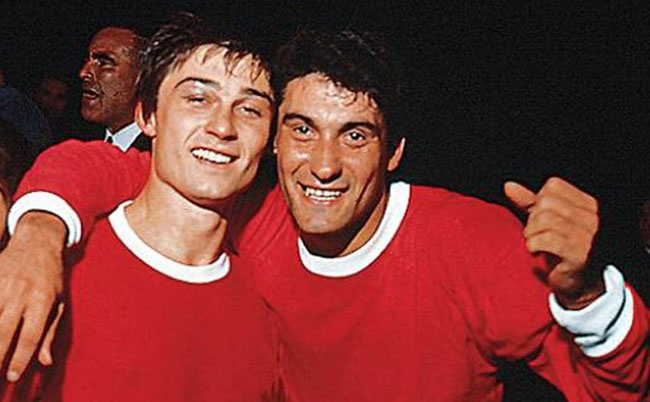
Some moments of the playoffs in Santiago de Chile. At right, Mura and Decaria celebrating
15 April 1965
Playoff

Independiente (Argentina)	4–1	(Uruguay) Peñarol
Pérez 10' (o.g.); Bernao 27'; Avallay 33'; Mura 82'		Joya 44'

Estadio Nacional, Santiago de Chile
Attendance: 40,000
Referee: Yamasaki (Peru)

**Independiente**	**Peñarol**

GK	1	(Argentina) Miguel Ángel Santoro
DF	2	(Argentina) Rubén Navarro (c)
DF	3	(Argentina) Raúl Decaria
MF	4	(Argentina) Roberto Ferreiro
MF	5	(Argentina) David Acevedo
MF	6	(Argentina) Juan C. Guzmán
FW	7	(Argentina) Rául Bernao
FW	8	(Argentina) Osvaldo Mura
FW	9	(Argentina) De la Mata, Jr.	Substituted off
FW	10	(Argentina) Roque Avallay
FW	11	(Argentina) Raúl Savoy
Substitutes:
MF		(Argentina) Miguel A. Mori	Substituted on
Manager:
(Argentina) Manuel Giúdice

GK	1	(Uruguay) Ladislao Mazurkiewicz
DF	2	(Uruguay) Carlos Pérez
DF	3	(Uruguay) Luis Varela (c)
MF	4	(Uruguay) Pablo Forlán
MF	5	(Uruguay) Néstor Gonçalves
MF	6	(Uruguay) Omar Caetano
FW	7	(Uruguay) Ernesto Ledesma
FW	8	(Uruguay) Pedro Rocha
FW	9	(Uruguay) Miguel Reznik	Substituted off
FW	10	(Uruguay) Héctor Silva
FW	11	(Peru) Juan Joya
Substitutes:
FW		(Uruguay) José Sasía	Substituted on
Manager:
(Uruguay) Roque Máspoli
