= 1962 Copa Libertadores =

3rd season of Copa Libertadores

1962 Copa de Campeones de América
Tournament details
- Dates: February 7 - August 30
- Teams: 10 (from 9 confederations)

Final positions
- Champions: (Brazil) Santos (1st title)
- Runners-up: (Uruguay) Peñarol

Tournament statistics
- Matches played: 26
- Goals scored: 107 (4.12 per match)
- Top scorer(s): (Brazil) Coutinho (Ecuador) Alberto Spencer (Ecuador) Enrique Raymondi (6 goals each)

The 1962 Copa de Campeones de América was the third edition of South America's premier club football tournament. Ten teams entered, one more than the previous season, with Venezuela again not sending a representative. This was the first edition in which the defending champions qualified automatically, allowing the nation which contained the holders to have an extra team in the tournament.

Santos ended the Carboneros' reign, as they defeated Peñarol 0–3 in the deciding playoff in Buenos Aires.

== Qualified teams ==
Country	Team	Qualification method	App	Last	Previous Best
CONMEBOL; 1 berth	Peñarol	1961 Copa Libertadores de América winners	3rd	1961	champion (2)
Argentina; 1 berth	Racing	1961 Primera División champion	first		
Bolivia; 1 berth	Deportivo Municipal	1961 Bolivian Primera División champion	first		
Brazil; 1 berth	Santos	1961 Taça Brasil champion	first		
Chile; 1 berth	Universidad Católica	1961 Primera División champion	first		
Colombia; 1 berth	Millonarios	1961 Campeonato Profesional champion	2nd	1960	semifinals
Ecuador; 1 berth	Emelec	1961 Campeonato Ecuatoriano de Fútbol champion	first		
Paraguay; 1 berth	Cerro Porteño	1961 Primera División champion	first		
Peru; 1 berth	Sporting Cristal	1961 Primera División champion	first		
Uruguay; 1 berth	Nacional	1961 Primera División runner-up	first		

== Format and tie-breaking criteria ==
This season saw the competition have an increase in participants by one team; as a result, the preliminary round from the previous season was eliminated. The first phase was now a group phase with three groups containing three clubs each. The format for the semifinals and the finals remained the same.

At each stage of the tournament, teams received 2 points for a win, 1 point for a draw, and no points for a loss. If two or more teams were equal on points, the following criteria was applied to determine the ranking in the group stage:

1. a one-game playoff;
2. superior goal difference;
3. draw of lots.

Starting this edition, a playoff would become the first tie-breaker, then goal difference.

== First round ==
Nine teams were drawn into three groups. In each group, teams played against each other home-and-away. The top team in each group advanced to the semifinals. Peñarol, the title holders, had a bye to the next round.

=== Group 1 ===
Team	Pld	W	D	L	GF	GA	GD	Pts
(Brazil) Santos	4	3	1	0	20	6	14	7
(Paraguay) Cerro Porteño	4	1	1	2	6	14	-8	3
(Bolivia) Deportivo Municipal	4	1	0	3	8	14	-6	2

11 February 1962	Deportivo Municipal (Bolivia)	2 - 1	(Paraguay) Cerro Porteño	La Paz
	Aguilera 4'; Camacho 84'		Jara 18'	Attendance: 20,000; Referee: (Peru) Alberto Tejada Burga

15 February 1962	Cerro Porteño (Paraguay)	3 - 2	(Bolivia) Deportivo Municipal	Asunción
	Insfrán 42'; Pavón 61'; Jiménez 84'		Torres 73'; Aguilera 83'	Attendance: 13,000; Referee: (Uruguay) Esteban Marino

18 February 1962	Deportivo Municipal (Bolivia)	3 - 4	(Brazil) Santos	Estadio Hernando Siles, La Paz
	Aguilera 16'; Torres 59'; Ruiz Díaz 62'		Lima 42'; Mengálvio 57'; Pagão 78'; Tite 80'	Attendance: 38,000; Referee: (Brazil) Olten Ayres de Abreu

21 February 1962	Santos (Brazil)	6 - 1	(Bolivia) Deportivo Municipal	Vila Belmiro, Santos
	Pepe 12'; Pagão 16', 46'; Dorval 24', 76'; Coutinho 56'		Aguilera 52'	Attendance: 35,000; Referee: (Peru) Alberto Tejada Burga

25 February 1962	Cerro Porteño (Paraguay)	1 - 1	(Brazil) Santos	Asunción
	Cabrera 82'		Dorval 56'	Attendance: 15,000; Referee: (Argentina) Luis Antonio Ventre

28 February 1962	Santos (Brazil)	9 - 1	(Paraguay) Cerro Porteño	Vila Belmiro, Santos
	Pepe 7', 86' (pen.); Coutinho 35', 54', 60'; Pelé 66', 89'; Dorval 69'; Zito 80'		Insfrán 20'	Attendance: 45,000; Referee: (Argentina) José Luis Praddaude

=== Group 2 ===
Team	Pld	W	D	L	GF	GA	GD	Pts
(Uruguay) Nacional	4	3	1	0	9	6	3	7
(Argentina) Racing	4	1	1	2	7	8	-1	3
(Peru) Sporting Cristal	4	1	0	3	5	7	-2	2

10 February 1962	Nacional (Uruguay)	3 - 2	(Peru) Sporting Cristal	Estadio Centenario, Montevideo
	Méndez 28' (pen.); Bergara 40'; Rodríguez 49'		Gallardo 52', 81'	Attendance: 32,000; Referee: (Chile) Domingo Massaro

14 February 1962	Racing (Argentina)	2 - 1	(Peru) Sporting Cristal	El Cilindro, Avellaneda
	Sosa 16', 46'		Del Castillo 32'	Attendance: 18,000; Referee: (Paraguay) José Dimas Larrosa

17 February 1962	Sporting Cristal (Peru)	0 - 1	(Uruguay) Nacional	Lima
			Douksas 69'	Attendance: 12,000; Referee: (Chile) Carlos Robles y Robles

20 February 1962	Sporting Cristal (Peru)	2 - 1	(Argentina) Racing	Lima
	Flores 23'; Gallardo 32'		Griguol 75'	Attendance: 15,000; Referee: (Chile) Carlos Robles y Robles

24 February 1962	Nacional (Uruguay)	3 - 2	(Argentina) Racing	Estadio Centenario, Montevideo
	Bergara 6'; Rodríguez 24'; Pérez 82'		Oleniak 2'; Belén 88'	Attendance: 40,000; Referee: (Chile) Carlos Robles y Robles

27 February 1962	Racing (Argentina)	2 - 2	(Uruguay) Nacional	El Cilindro, Avellaneda
	Marchetta 3'; Cárdenas 72'		Bergara 41'; Álvarez 84'	Attendance: 10,000; Referee: (Chile) Carlos Robles y Robles

=== Group 3 ===
Team	Pld	W	D	L	GF	GA	GD	Pts
(Chile) Universidad Católica	4	2	1	1	10	9	1	5
(Ecuador) Emelec	4	2	0	2	12	10	2	4
(Colombia) Millonarios	4	1	1	2	7	10	-3	3

7 February 1962	Emelec (Ecuador)	4 - 2	(Colombia) Millonarios	Estadio George Capwell, Guayaquil
	Lecaro 49' (pen.); Raymondi 50'; Gando 70'; Aquino 83'		Gamboa 9', 59'	Attendance: 40,000; Referee: (Uruguay) Pablo Victor Vaga Albergati

10 February 1962	Universidad Católica (Chile)	3 - 0	(Ecuador) Emelec	Estadio Nacional, Santiago
	Trigilli 35'; Tobar 71'; Fouilloux 76'			Attendance: 16,542; Referee: (Argentina) José Luis Praddaude

14 February 1962	Universidad Católica (Chile)	4 - 1	(Colombia) Millonarios	Estadio Nacional, Santiago
	Fouilloux 5', 73'; Trigilli 57'; Tobar 78'		Campillo 45'	Attendance: 25,000; Referee: (Uruguay) Juan Carlos Armental

18 February 1962	Millonarios (Colombia)	1 - 1	(Chile) Universidad Católica	Estadio El Campín, Bogotá
	Klinger 26'		Ramírez 30'	Attendance: 25,000; Referee: (Uruguay) Juan Carlos Armental

21 February 1962	Emelec (Ecuador)	7 - 2	(Chile) Universidad Católica	Estadio George Capwell, Guayaquil
	Lecaro 23' (pen.); Raymondi 27', 38', 41', 43', 65'; Bolaños 58'		Fouilloux 10'; Ramírez 15'	Attendance: 40,000; Referee: (Uruguay) Pablo Victor Vaga Albergati

28 February 1962	Millonarios (Colombia)	3 - 1	(Ecuador) Emelec	Estadio El Campín, Bogotá
	Fifi 30'; Benítez 59'; Moscol 70' (o.g.)		Gallego 22' (o.g.)	Attendance: 15,000; Referee: (Uruguay) Pablo Victor Vaga Albergati

== Semifinals ==
Four teams were drawn into two groups. In each group, teams played against each other home-and-away. The top team in each group advanced to the Finals.

=== Group A ===
Team	Pld	W	D	L	GF	GA	GD	Pts
(Brazil) Santos	2	1	1	0	2	1	+1	3
(Chile) Universidad Católica	2	0	1	1	1	2	−1	1

8 July 1962	Universidad Católica (Chile)	1 - 1	(Brazil) Santos	Estadio Nacional, Santiago
	Nawacki 75'		Lima 59'	Attendance: 27,236; Referee: (Peru) Alberto Tejada Burga

12 July 1962	Santos (Brazil)	1 - 0	(Chile) Universidad Católica	Estádio Vila Belmiro, Santos
	Zito 35'			Attendance: 15,000; Referee: (Peru) Alberto Tejada Burga

=== Group B ===
Team	Pld	W	D	L	GF	GA	GD	Pts
(Uruguay) Peñarol	2	1	0	1	4	3	+1	2
(Uruguay) Nacional	2	1	0	1	3	4	−1	2

8 July 1962	Nacional (Uruguay)	2 - 1	(Uruguay) Peñarol	Estadio Centenario, Montevideo
	González 10'; Escalada 55'		Moacyr 32' (pen.)	Attendance: 46,235; Referee: (Paraguay) Rubén Cabrera

18 July 1962	Peñarol (Uruguay)	3 - 1	(Uruguay) Nacional	Estadio Centenario, Montevideo
	Cabrera 20'; Spencer 72', 78'		Douksas 68'	Attendance: 50,381; Referee: (Paraguay) Rubén Cabrera

22 July 1962 Playoff	Peñarol (Uruguay)	1 - 1	(Uruguay) Nacional	Estadio Centenario, Montevideo
	Spencer 69'		Acosta 61'	Attendance: 58,058; Referee: (Peru) Alberto Tejada Burga

Peñarol progressed to the finals due to better goal difference.

== Finals ==
Team	Pld	W	D	L	GF	GA	GD	Pts
(Brazil) Santos	2	1	0	1	4	4	0	2
(Uruguay) Peñarol	2	1	0	1	4	4	0	2

28 July 1962	Peñarol (Uruguay)	1 - 2	(Brazil) Santos	Estadio Centenario, Montevideo
	Spencer 75'		Coutinho 5', 44'	Attendance: 48,105; Referee: (Chile) Carlos Robles y Robles

2 August 1962	Santos (Brazil)	2 - 3 (Note: Only 51 minutes of the second leg was considered official by CONMEBOL. The remaining 39 minutes was a friendly match. In the friendly time, Pagão tied the game at three goals a-piece, but the official score remained 2–3.)	(Uruguay) Peñarol	Estádio Vila Belmiro, Santos
	Dorval 17'; Mengálvio 35'		Spencer 14', 49'; Sasía 51'	Attendance: 18,000; Referee: (Chile) Carlos Robles y Robles

30 August 1962 Playoff	Santos (Brazil)	3 – 0	(Uruguay) Peñarol	Estadio Monumental, Buenos Aires
	Caetano 11' (o.g.); Pelé 48', 89'			Attendance: 60,000; Referee: (Netherlands) Leo Horn

== Champion ==
Copa Libertadores de América
1962 Champion

Santos
First Title

== Top goalscorers ==
Pos	Player	Team	Goals
1	(Brazil) Coutinho	(Brazil) Santos	6
1	(Ecuador) Alberto Spencer	(Uruguay) Peñarol	6
1	(Ecuador) Enrique Raymondi	(Ecuador) Emelec	6
2	(Brazil) Pelé	(Brazil) Santos	4
2	(Chile) Alberto Fouilloux	(Chile) Universidad Católica	4
2	(Bolivia) Luis Aguilera	(Bolivia) Municipal	4
