= 1964 in Argentine football =

Football in Argentina
- Season: 1964

1964 saw Club Atlético Independiente become the first Argentine team to win the Copa Libertadores. Boca Juniors were the champions of the Argentine first division.

== Primera División ==
Position	Team	Points	Played	Won	Drawn	Lost	For	Against	Difference
1	Boca Juniors	44	30	17	10	3	35	15	20
2	Independiente	38	30	15	8	7	44	26	18
3	River Plate	37	30	13	11	6	42	30	12
4	San Lorenzo	36	30	12	12	6	46	31	15
5	Atlanta	35	30	12	11	7	46	42	4
6	Racing Club	32	30	12	8	10	45	37	8
7	Banfield	32	30	11	10	9	34	32	2
8	Vélez Sársfield	31	30	12	7	11	43	36	7
9	Huracán	29	30	10	9	11	38	36	2
10	Ferro Carril Oeste	29	30	9	11	10	33	33	0
11	Rosario Central	28	30	7	14	10	37	38	-1
12	Chacarita Juniors	27	30	9	9	12	32	48	-16
13	Gimnasia de La Plata	25	30	6	13	11	27	36	-9
14	Estudiantes de La Plata	24	30	6	12	12	36	47	-11
15	Argentinos Juniors	17	30	4	9	17	26	45	-19
16	Newell's Old Boys	16	30	1	14	15	19	51	-32

=== Relegation ===
There was no relegation due to the expansion of the Primera División from 16 to 18 teams.

=== Copa Libertadores ===
- Boca Juniors qualified for Copa Libertadores 1965 via the league, Independiente qualified as the Libertadores champions of 1964.

== Copa Libertadores 1964 ==
- Independiente: Champions
