= Juan Nawacki =

Argentine footballer

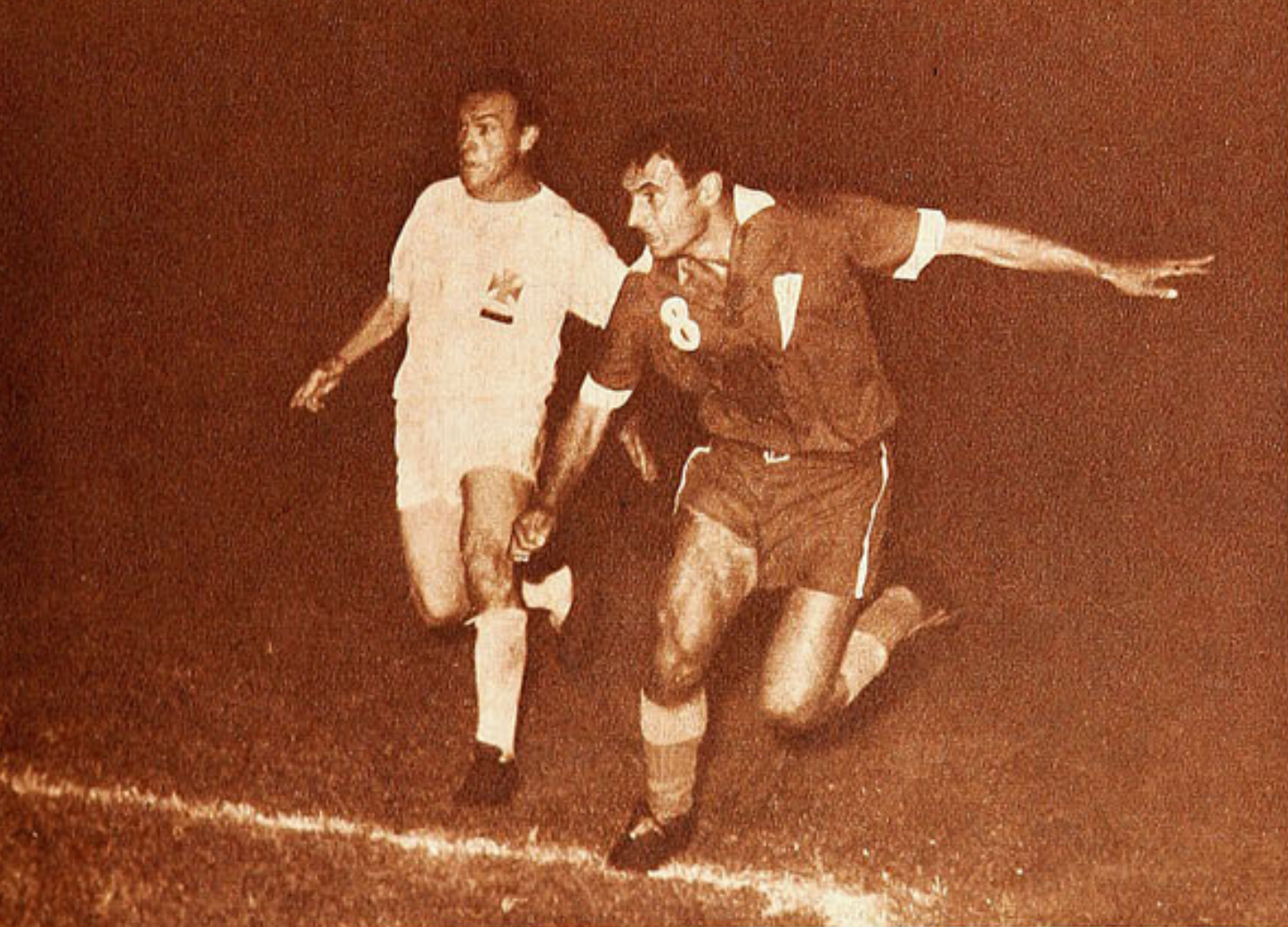
- Nawacki (left) with Universidad Católica in 1961

Personal information
- Full name: Juan Carlos Nawacki Semeñuck
- Date of birth: 8 October 1931
- Place of birth: Argentina
- Date of death: 15 February 2011 (aged 79)
- Position: Forward

Youth career
- Ferro Carril Oeste
- Argentinos Juniors

Senior career*
Years	Team	Apps	(Gls)
1955–1957	Argentinos Juniors		
1958–1960	Independiente		
1960–1964	Universidad Católica	33	(10)
1963	→ O'Higgins (loan)	7	(0)
1965	Deportes Quindío		

International career
1956	Argentina	1	(0)

Managerial career
- General Cabrera
- Estudiantes RC
- 1976: Arsenal de Holmberg
- 1977–1978: Fusión Belgrano-Toro
- 1983: Lota Schwager
- Everton Coronel Moldes
- * Club domestic league appearances and goals

Juan Carlos Nawacki Semeñuck (8 October 1931 – 15 February 2011), sometimes referred as Juan Nakwacki or Juan Nawacky, was an Argentine football forward and manager.

== Playing career ==
Nawacki was trained at Ferro Carril Oeste and Argentinos Juniors. At professional level, he spent seasons with Argentinos Juniors and Independiente in his homeland.

Nawacki helped Argentinos Juniors to win the 1955 Primera B Metropolitana and Independiente to win the 1960 Argentine Primera División.

In the second half of 1960, Nawacki was transferred to Chilean club Universidad Católica, coinciding with his fellow Ricardo Trigilli. They won the 1961 Primera División, the third league title for the club, and took part in the 1962 Copa Libertadores. A player for them until 1964, he also had a stint with O'Higgins in 1963.

Following Universidad Católica, Nawacki moved to Colombian club Deportes Quindío in 1965 and ended his career as player-manager in Córdoba, Argentina.

At international level, Nawacki represented the Argentina national team in the 1–2 away win against Uruguay on 10 October 1956.

== Coaching career ==
In 1977, Nawacki won the Liga Regional de Fútbol de Río Cuarto with Fusión Belgrano-Toro from Coronel Moldes, a merger of Club Atlético Belgrano and Toro Fútbol Club. Previously, he had led General Cabrera, Estudiantes de Río Cuarto with players such as Antonio Rattín and Ermindo Onega, and Arsenal de Holmberg.

Abroad, he coached Chilean club Lota Schwager in 1983.

== Honours ==
=== Player ===
Argentinos Juniors

- Primera B Metropolitana: 1955

Independiente

- Argentine Primera División: 1960

Universidad Católica

- Chilean Primera División: 1961

=== Manager ===
Fusión Belgrano-Toro

- Liga Regional de Fútbol de Río Cuarto: 1977
