= Luis Olivares =

Chilean footballer (1939–2024)

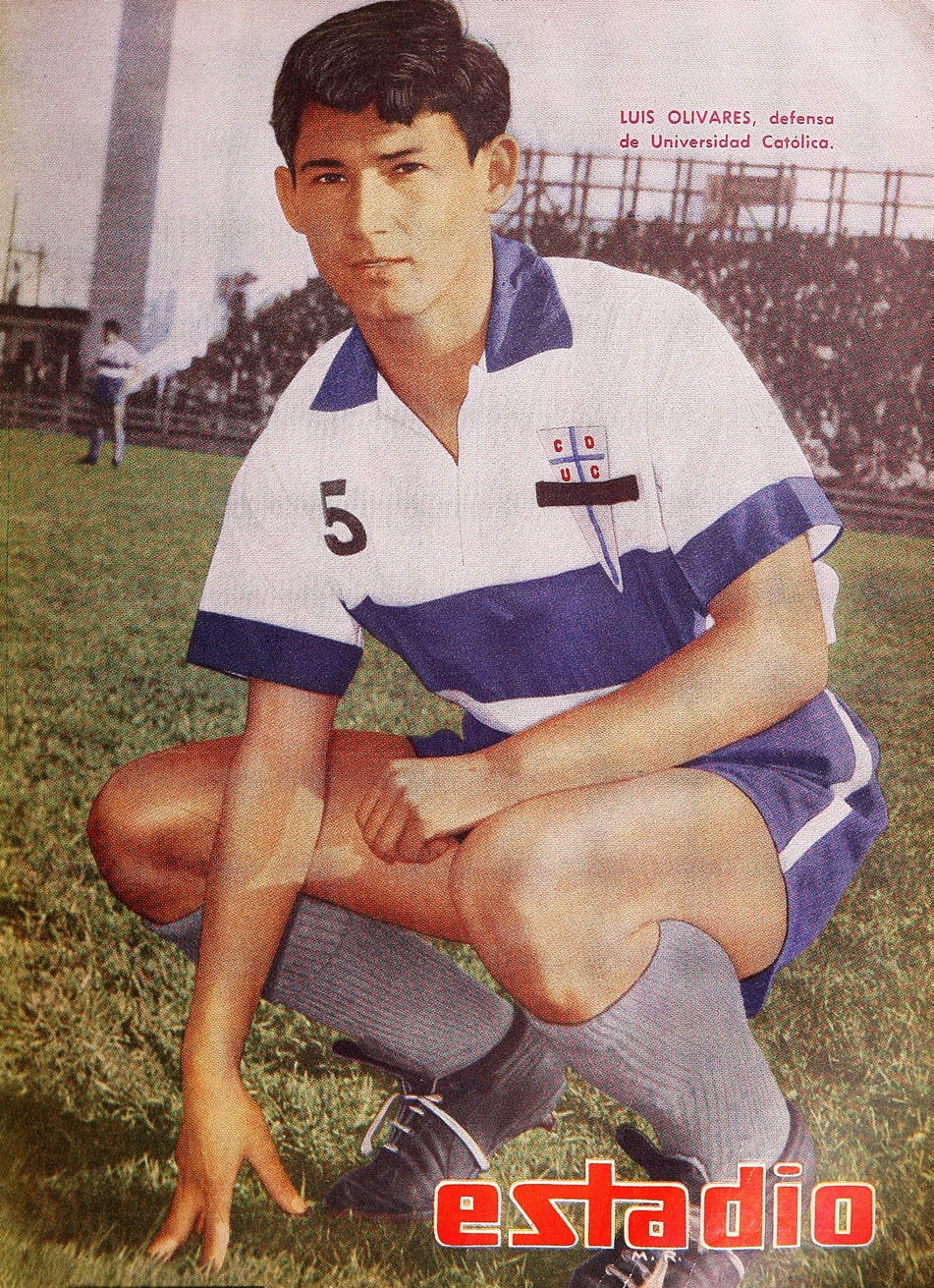
- Olivares in 1961

Personal information
- Full name: Luis Hernán Olivares Jiménez
- Date of birth: 8 October 1939
- Place of birth: Santiago, Chile
- Date of death: 1 October 2024 (aged 84)
- Position: Centre-back

Senior career*
Years	Team	Apps	(Gls)
1960–1967	Universidad Católica		
1968–1969	Green Cross Temuco		
1970	Fernández Vial		
- * Club domestic league appearances and goals

Luis Hernán Olivares Jiménez (8 October 1939 – 1 October 2024) was a Chilean footballer. He primarily played as a centre-back for Universidad Católica throughout the 1960s as he was a key player for the club throughout the decade, participating in the 1962 and the 1966 Copa Libertadores and being part of the winning teams for the 1961 and 1966 Primera División de Chile.

== Career ==
Olivares would make his senior debut on 4 December 1960 at the age of 21. At the time, Universidad Católica did not have a strong season with the club needing a victory over Colo-Colo to prevent relegation. Despite the club initially losing 0–2, they would later recover to a 2–2 draw with Olivares himself playing in the match. In the same season, he would play in a friendly against River Plate where the club would lose 1–0 and would meet László Kubala as a special guest. Despite his young age, Olivares would already be noted by the press for his talent.

Following the 1960 season, Olivares would be part of the club's lustrum of success where the club became champions of the 1961 and 1966 Primera División de Chile. During the 1961 season, Olivares would make 27 appearances and even score a goal with that number being increased to 30 appearances in 1962. Despite only making 24 appearances for the 1963 Primera División de Chile, he would score another goal. His appearances within the club would begin to decline drastically as he would only play in two matches by the 1966 season. His final season with the club would occur in 1967.

== Death ==
Olivares died on 1 October 2024, at the age of 84.
