= Sergio Silva =

Sergio Silva may refer to:

- Sergio Silva (Uruguayan footballer) (died 2000), Uruguayan footballer
- Sérgio Silva (Portuguese footballer) (born 1994), Portuguese footballer
