= 1963 in Argentine football =

Football in Argentina
- Season: 1963

1963 saw Independiente win the Argentine first division. Boca Juniors were runners up in the Copa Libertadores 1963.

The Argentina national team finished in 3rd place in the Copa América.

== Primera División ==
Position	Team	Points	Played	Won	Drawn	Lost	For	Against	Difference
1	Independiente	37	26	14	9	3	53	25	28
2	River Plate	35	26	13	9	4	48	23	25
3	Racing Club	30	26	11	8	7	43	32	11
4	Boca Juniors	30	26	12	6	8	30	29	1
5	Atlanta	28	26	12	4	10	35	37	-2
6	Huracán	27	26	8	11	7	36	31	5
7	Banfield	25	26	7	11	8	36	27	9
8	San Lorenzo	25	26	9	7	10	37	46	-9
9	Estudiantes de La Plata	24	26	9	6	11	37	43	-6
10	Rosario Central	22	26	6	10	10	34	43	-9
11	Argentinos Juniors	22	26	5	12	9	28	43	-15
12	Gimnasia de La Plata	21	26	7	7	12	33	41	-8
13	Vélez Sársfield	20	26	5	10	11	32	44	-12
14	Chacarita Juniors	18	26	4	10	12	25	43	-18

=== Relegation ===
There was no relegation due to the expansion of the Primera División from 14 to 16 teams.

=== Copa Libertadores ===
- Independiente qualified for Copa Libertadores 1964 via the league.

== Copa Libertadores 1963 ==
- Boca Juniors: Runners-up

== Argentina national team ==
Copa América

- 1963 South American Championship: 3rd place
