= Rubén Navarro (Argentine footballer) =

Argentine footballer

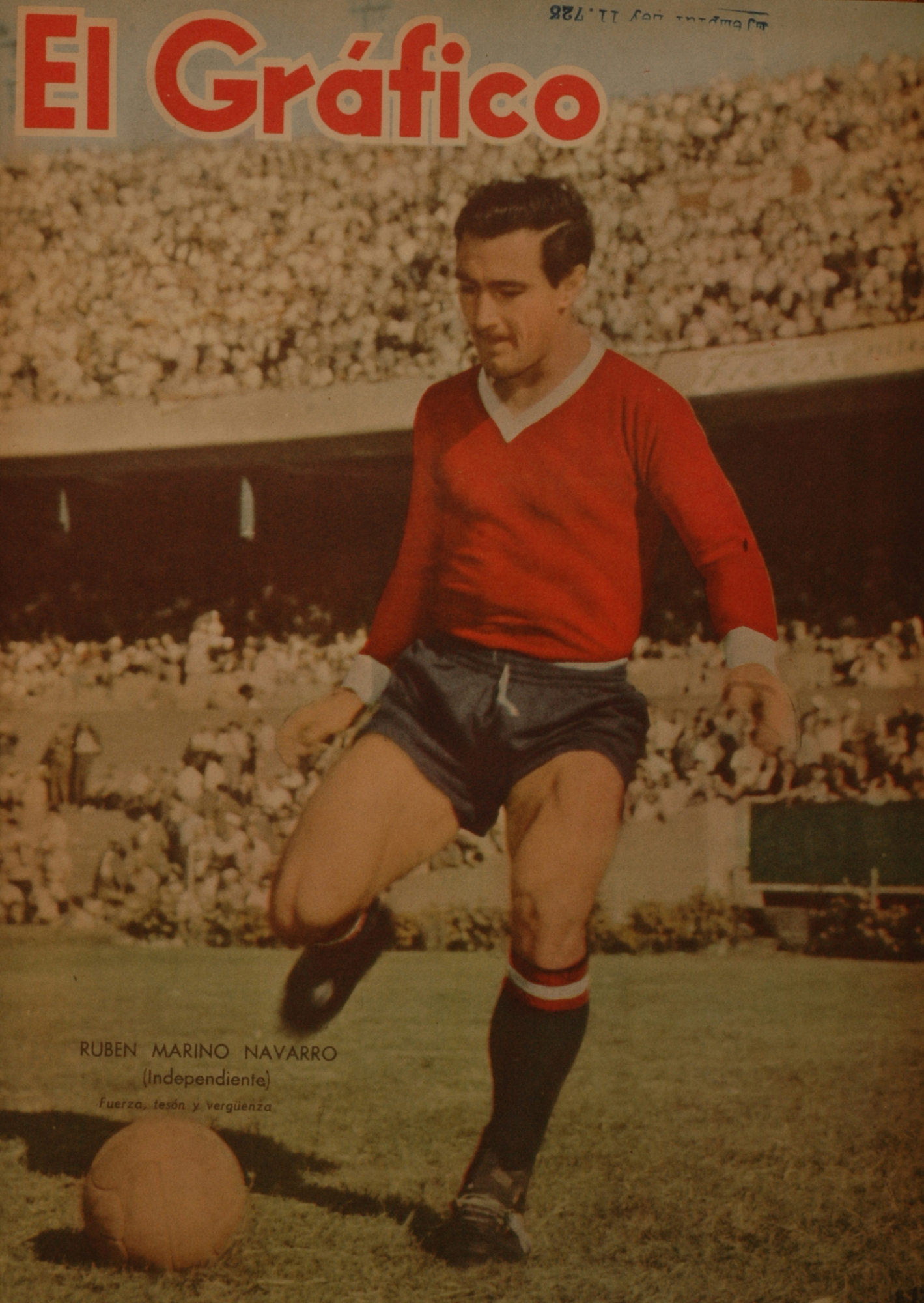

Personal information
- Full name: Rubén Marino Navarro
- Date of birth: 30 March 1933
- Place of birth: La Banda, Argentina
- Date of death: 14 July 2003 (aged 70)
- Place of death: Buenos Aires, Argentina
- Height: 1.78 m (5 ft 10 in)
- Position: Defender

Senior career*
Years	Team	Apps	(Gls)
1954–1966	Independiente	209	(0)
1967	Philadelphia Spartans	14	(1)
1968	Cleveland Stokers	32	(0)
Total		255	(1)

International career
1960–1963	Argentina	32	(0)
- * Club domestic league appearances and goals

Rubén Navarro (30 March 1933 – 14 July 2003) was an Argentine association football player. He is mainly remembered for winning two consecutive Copa Libertadores titles with Independiente (1964, 1965).

== Club career ==
Born in La Banda in the Santiago del Estero Province in northern Argentina, Navarro joined the Buenos Aires side Independiente in 1952 and had his professional debut for the club in 1954. He first played as a forward but made a name for himself playing as defender.

With Independiente Navarro won the 1960 and 1963 Argentine Primera División. He played for the club in their first appearance in the Copa Libertadores in 1961 when they were knocked out in the first round by Brazilian side Palmeiras.

However, their later appearances in the competition proved to be much more successful as Independiente with Navarro went on to win the 1964 and 1965 Copa Libertadores titles, beating Uruguay's Nacional and Peñarol in the finals. Navarro played at Independiente until 1966 and appeared in a total of 209 games for the Buenos Aires club.

In 1967, he left for the United States to join the Philadelphia Spartans of the NPSL, one of two start-up leagues in America. The Spartans finished the year tied for the best record in the Eastern Division, but missed the chance to play in the finals on goals. That season he was voted a first team all-star and MVP of the league by The Sporting News. In December 1967 the NPSL and the USA merged to form one league, the NASL. The Philadelphia franchise folded before the start of the 1968 season and several of their top players, including Navarro, were picked up by the Cleveland Stokers. Cleveland won the Lakes Division of the Eastern Conference, but fell to eventual champion Atlanta in the league semi-finals. In 1968, he was again named a first team all-star and retired after the season ended.

== International career ==
Navarro was capped 32 times for Argentina national football team between 1960 and 1963. He was member of the country's 1962 FIFA World Cup squad and appeared in two matches at the tournament, captaining the side against England and Bulgaria.

The following year he also appeared for Argentina in the 1963 South American Championship in which Argentina came in third behind hosts Bolivia and Paraguay. Navarro played in all six matches in the tournament.

== Honors ==
=== Club ===
Independiente

- Argentine Primera División (2): 1960, 1962
- Copa Libertadores (2): 1964, 1965

Philadelphia Spartans

- Eastern Division (runner-up): 1967

Cleveland Stokers

- Lakes Division (1): 1968
- Eastern Conference (runner-up): 1968

=== International ===
Argentina

- FIFA World Cup qualifier: 1962
- Copa América (3rd place): 1963

=== Individual ===
- NPSL Most Valuable Player (1): 1967
- NPSL First Team All-Star (1): 1967
- NASL First Team All-Star (1): 1968
- FIFA World Cup captain: 1962 (2 matches)
