= 1964 Copa Libertadores =

5th season of Copa Libertadores

1964 Copa de Campeones de América
Tournament details
- Dates: April 3 - August 12
- Teams: 11 (from 10 confederations)

Final positions
- Champions: (Argentina) Independiente (1st title)
- Runners-up: (Uruguay) Nacional

Tournament statistics
- Matches played: 26
- Goals scored: 88 (3.38 per match)
- Top scorer(s): (Argentina) Mario Rodríguez (Paraguay) Celino Mora (6 goals each)

The 1964 Copa de Campeones de América was the fifth edition of South America's premier club football tournament. For the first time since its inception, every member of CONMEBOL was represented in the competition. Deportivo Italia became the first club from Venezuela to participate, providing an unexpectedly impressive performance after eliminating Bahia of Brazil in the preliminary round and beating Barcelona in Guayaquil.

Building up on Boca Juniors' great showing in the last season, Argentine football managed to put themselves on the international map as Independiente won Argentina's first title. El Diablo Rojo, or Red Devil, eliminated the powerful Santos, which played without the main stars of its attack (Dorval, Mengálvio, Coutinho and an injured Pelé didn't play, and Pepe played just the first match of the semifinal). After winning both matches of their semifinal series, the Argentines dispatched Nacional in the finals. Mario Rodríguez was a key factor in Independiente's triumph and was the top scorer of the tournament with 6 goals.

== Qualified teams ==
| Country | Team | Qualification method |
|---|---|---|
| CONMEBOL; 1 berth | Santos | 1963 Copa Libertadores de América winners |
| Argentina; 1 berth | Independiente | 1963 Primera División champion |
| Bolivia; 1 berth | Aurora | 1963 Copa Simón Bolívar champion |
| Brazil; 1 berth | Bahia | 1963 Campeonato Brasileiro Série A runner-up |
| Chile; 1 berth | Colo-Colo | 1963 Primera División champion |
| Colombia; 1 berth | Millonarios | 1963 Campeonato Profesional champion |
| Ecuador; 1 berth | Barcelona | 1963 Campeonato Ecuatoriano de Fútbol champion |
| (Paraguay) Paraguay; 1 berth | Cerro Porteño | 1963 Primera División champion |
| Peru; 1 berth | Alianza Lima | 1963 Primera División champion |
| Uruguay; 1 berth | Nacional | 1963 Primera División champion |
| Venezuela; 1 berth | Deportivo Italia | 1963 Venezuelan Primera División champion |

== Tie-breaking criteria ==
This edition saw a first round, with three groups containing three teams each; the preliminary round from the 1961 edition was reintroduced. The format for the semifinals and the finals remained unchanged.

At each stage of the tournament teams receive 2 points for a win, 1 point for a draw, and no points for a loss. If two or more teams are equal on points, the following criteria will be applied to determine the ranking in the group stage:

1. a one-game playoff;
2. superior goal difference;
3. draw of lots.

== Preliminary round ==
Owing to the uneven number of teams in the competition, a preliminary round was created to determine who joined the other 9 teams in the competition. As a predominated "weak" side, Venezuela has its representative face off against Brazil's second representative. The winner of the series would advance into the First round. Both matches took place in Caracas.

| Team | Pld | W | D | L | GF | GA | GD | Pts |
|---|---|---|---|---|---|---|---|---|
| (Venezuela) Deportivo Italia | 2 | 1 | 1 | 0 | 2 | 1 | +1 | 3 |
| (Brazil) Bahía | 2 | 0 | 1 | 1 | 1 | 2 | -1 | 1 |

| April 3, 1964 | Deportivo Italia (Venezuela) | 0 – 0 | (Brazil) Bahía | Estadio Olímpico, Caracas |
| | | | | Referee: Olten Aires de Abreu (Brazil) |

| April 8, 1964 | Bahía (Brazil) | 1 – 2 | (Venezuela) Deportivo Italia | Estadio Olímpico, Caracas |
| | Vevé 54' | | Jaime 52'; Iranildo 60' | Referee: Olten Aires de Abreu (Brazil) |

== First round ==
Nine teams were drawn into groups of three. In each group, teams played against each other home-and-away. The top team in each group advanced to the Semifinals. Santos, the title holders, had a bye to the next round.

=== Group 1 ===
| Team | Pld | W | D | L | GF | GA | GD | Pts |
|---|---|---|---|---|---|---|---|---|
| (Uruguay) Nacional | 4 | 3 | 1 | 0 | 9 | 2 | 7 | 7 |
| (Paraguay) Cerro Porteño | 4 | 1 | 2 | 1 | 11 | 6 | 5 | 4 |
| (Bolivia) Aurora | 4 | 0 | 1 | 3 | 2 | 14 | -12 | 1 |

| April 12, 1964 | Aurora (Bolivia) | 2 – 2 | (Paraguay) Cerro Porteño | Félix Capriles, Cochabamba |
| | Herbas 39'; García 59' | | Mora 78'; B. Rojas 85' | Referee: Miguel Comesaña (Argentina) |

| April 19, 1964 | Nacional (Uruguay) | 2 – 0 | (Bolivia) Aurora | Centenario, Montevideo |
| | Abeledo 40', 67' | | | Referee: Eunápio de Queiroz (Brazil) |

| April 26, 1964 | Cerro Porteño (Paraguay) | 2 – 2 | (Uruguay) Nacional | Puerto Sajonia, Asunción |
| | Mora 46', 50' | | Méndez 36'; Oyarbide 55' | Referee: Adolfo Reginatto (Chile) |

| May 3, 1964 | Aurora (Bolivia) | 0 – 3 | (Uruguay) Nacional | Félix Capriles, Cochabamba |
| | | | Bergara 51'; Pérez 87'; Acosta 88' | Referee: Alberto Tejada (Peru) |

| May 10, 1964 | Nacional (Uruguay) | 2 – 0 | (Paraguay) Cerro Porteño | Centenario, Montevideo |
| | Bergara 17'; Pérez 69' | | | Referee: Ángel Coerezza (Argentina) |

| May 17, 1964 | Cerro Porteño (Paraguay) | 7 – 0 | (Bolivia) Aurora | Puerto Sajonia, Asunción |
| | Báez 32' (pen.); Monges 41'; Mora 50', 69', 77'; B. Rojas 76'; J.C. Rojas 83' | | | Referee: Miguel Comesaña (Argentina) |

=== Group 2 ===
| Team | Pld | W | D | L | GF | GA | GD | Pts |
|---|---|---|---|---|---|---|---|---|
| (Argentina) Independiente | 4 | 3 | 1 | 0 | 11 | 3 | 8 | 7 |
| (Colombia) Millonarios | 4 | 2 | 0 | 2 | 6 | 8 | -2 | 4 |
| (Peru) Alianza Lima | 4 | 0 | 1 | 3 | 5 | 11 | -6 | 1 |

| May 7, 1964 | Millonarios (Colombia) | 3 – 2 | (Peru) Alianza Lima | El Campín, Bogotá |
| | Gamboa 30', 53', 86' | | Zegarra 8', 70' | Referee: Carlos Robles (Chile) |

| May 31, 1964 | Independiente (Argentina) | 4 – 0 | (Peru) Alianza Lima | Independiente, Avellaneda |
| | Savoy 4'; Rodríguez 35'; Rolan 40'; Suárez 88' | | | Referee: José Dimas Larrosa (Paraguay) |

| June 4, 1964 | Alianza Lima (Peru) | 2 – 2^{[A]} | (Argentina) Independiente | El Cilindro, Avellaneda |
| | León 24', 82' | | Savoy 42', 60' (pen.) | Referee: José Dimas Larrosa (Paraguay) |

| June 7, 1964 | Independiente (Argentina) | 5 – 1 | (Colombia) Millonarios | Independiente, Avellaneda |
| | Suárez 30', 47'; Rodríguez 33', 74'; Savoy 63' | | Orlando 7' | Referee: Carlos Robles (Chile) |

| June 28, 1964 | Alianza Lima (Peru) | 1 – 2^{[B]} | (Colombia) Millonarios | El Campín, Bogotá |
| | Zegarra 76' | | Sílvio 25'; Gando 78' | Referee: Esteban Marino (Uruguay) |

| July 8, 1964 | Millonarios (Colombia) | ^{[C]} | (Argentina) Independiente | Bogotá |

=== Group 3 ===
| Team | Pld | W | D | L | GF | GA | GD | Pts |
|---|---|---|---|---|---|---|---|---|
| (Chile) Colo-Colo | 4 | 3 | 0 | 1 | 9 | 7 | 2 | 6 |
| (Ecuador) Barcelona | 4 | 2 | 0 | 2 | 9 | 4 | 5 | 4 |
| (Venezuela) Deportivo Italia | 4 | 1 | 0 | 3 | 2 | 9 | -7 | 2 |

| May 3, 1964 | Barcelona (Ecuador) | 0 – 1 | (Venezuela) Deportivo Italia | Modelo, Guayaquil |
| | | | Bezerra 83' | Referee: Carlos Robles (Chile) |

| May 5, 1964 | Colo-Colo (Chile) | 4 – 0 | (Venezuela) Deportivo Italia | Nacional, Santiago |
| | Valdés 53'; Álvarez 66'; Moreno 86'; Roberto 89' | | | Referee: Carlos Rivero (Peru) |

| May 13, 1964 | Barcelona (Ecuador) | 2 – 3 | (Chile) Colo-Colo | Modelo, Guayaquil |
| | Nivaldo 64', 76' | | Roberto 34'; Álvarez 55'; Valdés 59' | Referee: Carlos Rivero (Peru) |

| May 17, 1964 | Deportivo Italia (Venezuela) | 1 – 2 | (Chile) Colo-Colo | Estadio Olímpico, Caracas |
| | Jaime 54' | | Roberto 3'; Moreno 25' | Referee: Walter Van Rosberg (Netherlands Antilles) |

| May 24, 1964 | Deportivo Italia (Venezuela) | 0 – 3 | (Ecuador) Barcelona | Estadio Olímpico, Caracas |
| | | | Calderón 48'; Geninho 72'; Nivaldo 88' | Referee: Walter Van Rosberg (Netherlands Antilles) |

| May 28, 1964 | Colo-Colo (Chile) | 0 – 4 | (Ecuador) Barcelona | Nacional, Santiago |
| | | | Nivaldo 29', 80'; Hélio 59'; Geninho 82' | Referee: José María Codesal (Uruguay) |

== Semifinals ==
Four teams were drawn into two groups. In each group, teams played against each other home-and-away. The top team in each group advanced to the Finals.

=== Group A ===
| Team | Pld | W | D | L | GF | GA | GD | Pts |
|---|---|---|---|---|---|---|---|---|
| (Argentina) Independiente | 2 | 2 | 0 | 0 | 5 | 3 | +2 | 4 |
| (Brazil) Santos | 2 | 0 | 0 | 2 | 3 | 5 | −2 | 0 |

| July 15, 1964 | Santos (Brazil) | 2 – 3 | (Argentina) Independiente | Maracanã, Rio de Janeiro |
| | Pepe 25'; Almir 35' | | Rodríguez 43'; Bernao 45'; Suárez 89' | Referee: Arthur Holland (England) |

| July 22, 1964 | Independiente (Argentina) | 2 – 1 | (Brazil) Santos | Independiente, Avellaneda |
| | Mori 37'; Rodríguez 68' | | Toninho 38' | Referee: Arthur Holland (England) |

=== Group B ===
| Team | Pld | W | D | L | GF | GA | GD | Pts |
|---|---|---|---|---|---|---|---|---|
| (Uruguay) Nacional | 2 | 2 | 0 | 0 | 8 | 4 | +4 | 4 |
| (Chile) Colo-Colo | 2 | 0 | 0 | 2 | 4 | 8 | −4 | 0 |

| July 15, 1964 | Colo-Colo (Chile) | 2 – 4 | (Uruguay) Nacional | Nacional, Santiago |
| | Baeza 62' (o.g.); Álvarez 77' | | Sanfilippo 6', 72'; Leites 44'; Douksas 86' | Referee: Jim Finney (England) |

| August 1, 1964 | Nacional (Uruguay) | 4 – 2 | (Chile) Colo-Colo | Centenario, Montevideo |
| | Douksas 11'; Jaburú 17', 44'; Pérez 76' | | Jiménez 28'; Valdés 54' | Referee: Kevin Howley (England) |

== Finals ==
| Team | Pld | W | D | L | GF | GA | GD | Pts |
|---|---|---|---|---|---|---|---|---|
| (Argentina) Independiente | 2 | 1 | 1 | 0 | 1 | 0 | +1 | 3 |
| (Uruguay) Nacional | 2 | 0 | 1 | 1 | 0 | 1 | −1 | 1 |

| August 6, 1964 | Nacional (Uruguay) | 0 – 0 | (Argentina) Independiente | Estadio Centenario, Montevideo |
| | | | | Attendance: 60,000; Referee: Leo Horn (Netherlands) |

| August 12, 1964 | Independiente (Argentina) | 1 – 0 | (Uruguay) Nacional | La Doble Visera, Avellaneda |
| | Rodríguez 35' | | | Attendance: 80,000; Referee: José Dimas Larrosa (Paraguay) |

== Champion ==
Copa Libertadores de América
1964 Champion

Independiente
First Title

== Top goalscorers ==
| Pos | Player | Team | Goals |
|---|---|---|---|
| 1 | (Argentina) Mario Rodríguez | (Argentina) Independiente | 6 |
| 1 | (Paraguay) Celino Mora | (Paraguay) Cerro Porteño | 6 |
| 3 | (Brazil) Nivaldo | (Ecuador) Barcelona | 5 |
| 4 | (Argentina) Luis Eduardo Suárez | (Argentina) Independiente | 4 |
| 4 | (Argentina) Raúl Armando Savoy | (Argentina) Independiente | 4 |
| 3 | (Colombia) Delio Gamboa | (Colombia) Millonarios | 3 |
| 3 | (Chile) Francisco Valdés | (Chile) Colo-Colo | 3 |
| 3 | (Chile) Luis Hernán Álvarez | (Chile) Colo-Colo | 3 |
| 3 | (Brazil) Roberto Frojuelo | (Chile) Colo-Colo | 3 |
| 3 | (Uruguay) Domingo Pérez | (Uruguay) Nacional | 3 |
| 3 | (Peru) Víctor Zegarra | (Peru) Alianza Lima | 3 |

== Footnotes ==
A. Played in Avellaneda (Racing Club's stadium) due to the tragedy around the olympic qualifier between Peru and Argentina in Lima.
B. Played in Bogotá (El Campin) due to the tragedy around the olympic qualifier between Peru and Argentina in Lima.
C. Not played due to differences between CONMEBOL and the Colombian football federations, ADEFútbol and FEDEBOL (after Independiente refused to travel to Bogotá); points incredibly were awarded to Independiente despite refused to play (but no goals).
