= Rubén Navarro =

Rubén Navarro may refer to:

- Rubén Navarro (Argentine footballer) (1933-2003), Argentine football defender
- Rubén Navarro (Spanish footballer) (born 1978), Spanish football striker
