= David Acevedo =

Argentine footballer (born 1937)

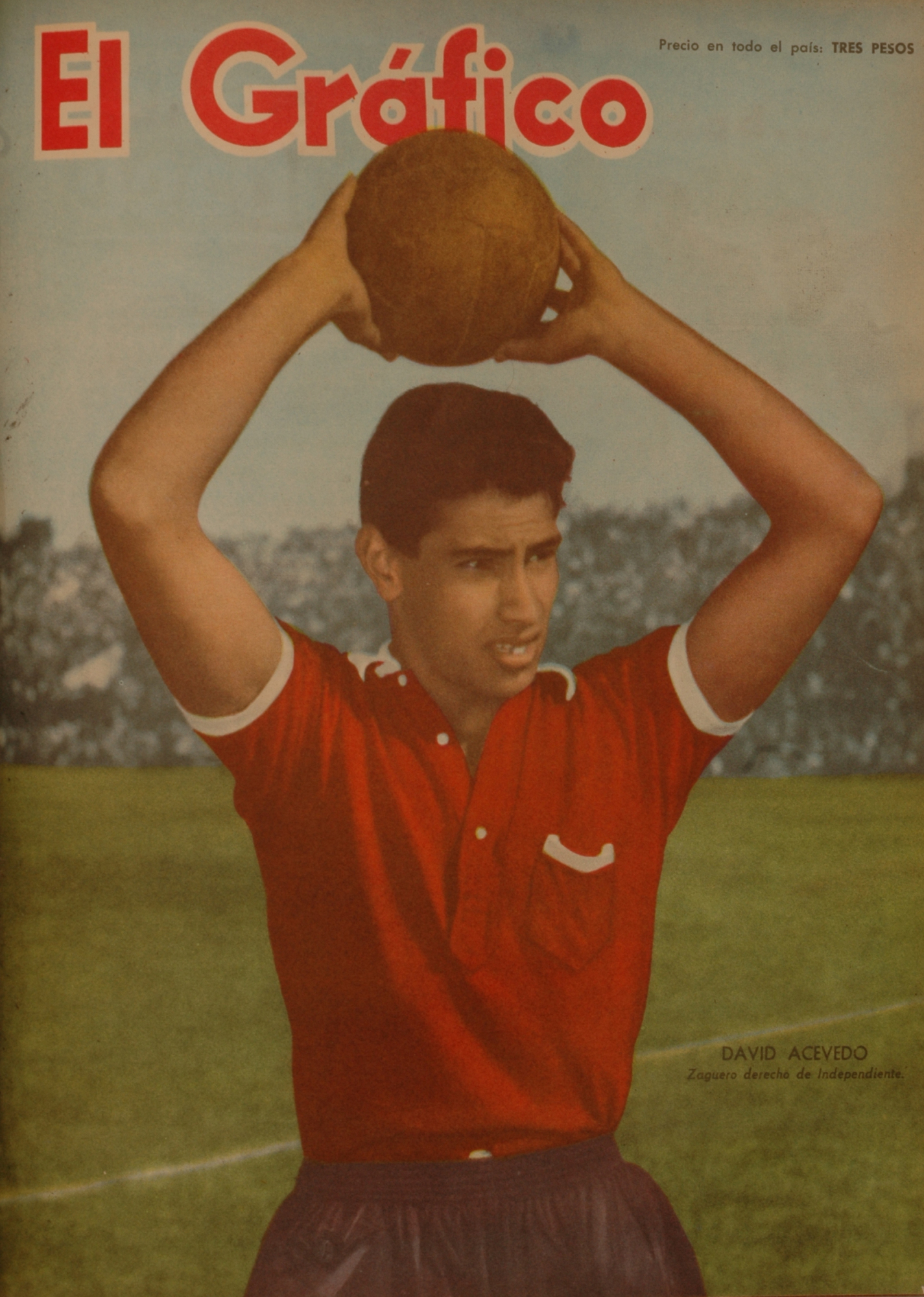
- David Acevedo in 1958

Personal information
- Date of birth: 20 February 1937 (age 89)
- Place of birth: Santa Fe, Argentina
- Height: 1.78 m (5 ft 10 in)
- Position: Defender

Senior career*
Years	Team	Apps	(Gls)
1957–1969	Independiente	229	(4)
1970	Banfield	19	(0)
Total		248	(4)

International career
1967	Argentina	5	(0)
- * Club domestic league appearances and goals

David Acevedo (born 20 February 1937) is an Argentine former footballer who played as a defender. He was in Argentina's squads for the 1958 FIFA World Cup and the 1967 South American Championship. He also played for Club Atlético Independiente. He is the last survivor of the Argentine squad in the 1958 FIFA World Cup.

== Honours ==
- Copa Libertadores: 1964, 1965
- Argentine Primera División: 1960, 1963, 1967 Nacional,
