= Ondino Viera =

Uruguayan football manager (1901–1997)

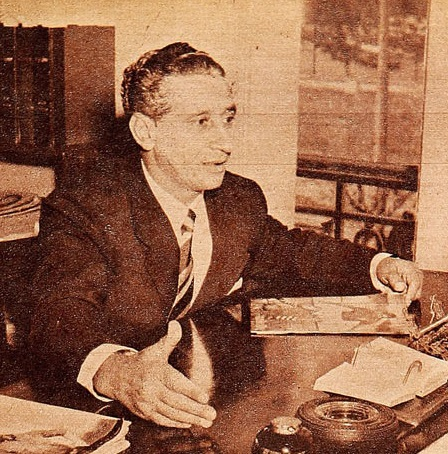
- Viera in 1950

Personal information
- Full name: Ondino Leonel Viera Palasérez
- Date of birth: 10 September 1901
- Place of birth: Cerro Largo, Uruguay
- Date of death: 27 June 1997 (aged 95)
- Place of death: Montevideo, Uruguay

Managerial career
- Years: Team
- 1928: Cerro Largo Selection
- 1930–1933: Nacional
- 1936–1937: River Plate
- 1938–1941: Fluminense
- 1942–1946: Vasco da Gama
- 1947: Botafogo
- 1948–1949: Fluminense
- 1950–1953: Bangu
- 1953: Palmeiras
- 1954–1955: Atlético Mineiro
- 1955–1960: Nacional
- 1962: Centro Iqueño
- 1963: Paraguay
- 1963–1964: Guaraní
- 1965: Cerro
- 1967: New York Skyliners
- 1965–1967: Uruguay
- 1967: Bangu
- 1969: Colón
- 1971: Liverpool de Montevideo
- 1972: Peñarol
- 1972: LDU Quito

Ondino Leonel Viera Palasérez (10 September 1901 – 27 June 1997), in Brazil also known as Ondino Vieira, was a Uruguayan football manager. He was the first coach to use a 4-2-4 in Brazil. In his long-lasting career he won between the 1930s and 1960s important titles with clubs in Argentina, Brazil, Uruguay and Paraguay. With the national team of Paraguay he reached second spot at the Copa América of 1963 and at the World Cup of 1966 in England he led Uruguay into the quarterfinals.

He was the manager of the Uruguay national team during the 1966 FIFA World Cup. His nephew Milton was also in the World Cup squad.

In 1967 the United Soccer Association imported entire squads from Europe and South America to play in North America. With Viera as manager, Cerro played as the New York Skyliners.

He also coached Nacional, Fluminense, where he achieved great success and coached the second-most games in club's history, Vasco da Gama and Peñarol.

He was famously quoted as saying "Other countries have their history. Uruguay has its football".

== Honours ==
- Uruguayan Championship: 1934 (?), 1955, 1956, 1957
- Argentine Primera División: 1936, 1937
- Paraguayan Primera División: 1964
- State Championship of Rio de Janeiro: 1938, 1940, 1941, Torneio Extra 1941, 1945
- Copa América: 1963 (2. Place)
