= Mario Rodríguez (footballer, born 1937) =

Argentine footballer (1937–2015)

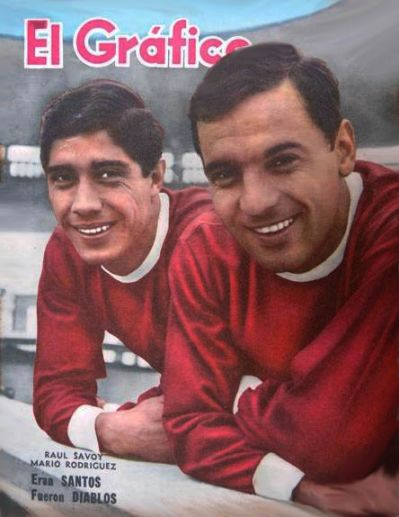
- Rodríguez (right) with Raúl Savoy in 1963

Personal information
- Full name: Mario Rodríguez Varela
- Date of birth: 20 October 1937
- Place of birth: Buenos Aires, Argentina
- Date of death: 10 May 2015 (aged 77)
- Position: Forward

Youth career
- Estrella del Plata
- Antártida Argentina
- Ciclón de Villa Martelli
- 1954–1957: Chacarita Juniors

Senior career*
Years	Team	Apps	(Gls)
1957–1962	Chacarita Juniors	86	(43)
1963–1965	Independiente	68	(32)
1966–1967	Vélez Sarsfield	14	(6)
1968–1969	Colo-Colo	52	(28)
1970	Audax Italiano	21	(6)
1971	Chacarita Juniors		

International career
1962–1963	Argentina	10	(6)
- * Club domestic league appearances and goals

Mario Rodríguez Varela (20 October 1937 – 10 May 2015), was an Argentine professional footballer who played as a forward. Nicknamed Mariulo, he was the topscorer of the 1964 Copa Libertadores with six goals.

== Club career ==
Rodríguez was born in Palermo, Buenos Aires and grew in Barrio Norte; he played at youth level for Chacarita Juniors. He then made his professional debut in 1957, playing in the Argentine second level; during the 1960 season he debuted in Primera División Argentina for Chacarita Juniors: thanks to his goalscoring skills, good physical strength and he managed to become one of the best forwards of the Argentine league. In 1963 he and Raúl Savoy moved to Independiente: Rodríguez was one of the protagonists of the two wins in the 1964 and 1965 editions of the Copa Libertadores, scoring many goals. He then left Independiente for Vélez Sarsfield, but he struggled to obtain opportunities to play, and eventually decide to leave Argentina for Chile. He then signed for Colo-Colo, where he played 2 seasons, scoring a total of 28 goals in 52 games. He switched to Audax Italiano in 1970. He then moved back to Argentina in 1971.

== International career ==
Rodríguez played 10 international games for Argentina between 1962 and 1963. His first game was Argentina-Uruguay played on 13 March 1962. He scored 5 of his 6 goals during the 1963 South American Championship, and scored the sixth one on 16 April 1963 against Brazil.
