= Orlando Ramírez (footballer) =

Chilean footballer (1943-2018)

Personal information
- Full name: Orlando Aliro Ramírez Vera
- Date of birth: 7 May 1943
- Place of birth: Santiago, Chile
- Date of death: 26 July 2018 (aged 75)
- Place of death: Santiago, Chile
- Position: Forward

Senior career*
Years	Team	Apps	(Gls)
1961–1964	Universidad Católica		
1965–1970	Palestino		

International career
1962–1968	Chile	14	(2)
- * Club domestic league appearances and goals

Orlando Aliro Ramírez Vera (7 May 1943 – 26 July 2018) was a Chilean football forward who played for Chile in the 1966 FIFA World Cup. He also played for Universidad Católica and Palestino.

== Honours ==
Universidad Católica

- Chilean Primera División: 1961
