= New York Skyliners =

Defunct American soccer club

- Full name: New York Skyliners
- Nickname: Skyliners
- Founded: 1966
- Dissolved: 1968; 58 years ago
- Stadium: Yankee Stadium, The Bronx, New York City
- Capacity: 50,000
- Owner: Madison Square Garden
- Head coach: Ondino Viera
- League: USA
- 1967: 5th. of Eastern Division
Home colors

The New York Skyliners were a soccer team based in the Bronx borough of New York City. The club were a charter member of the United Soccer Association (USA) in 1967 and played their home games as Yankee Stadium.

== History ==
In 1966 several groups of entrepreneurs were exploring the idea of forming a professional soccer league in United States. One of these groups, United Soccer Association (USA) led by Jack Kent Cooke, selected 12 cities for team locations and the Irving Mitchell Felt purchased a franchise as part of the Madison Square Garden Corporation. The USA originally planned to start play in the spring of 1968; however the rival National Professional Soccer League, which secured a TV contract from CBS, announced it was ready to launch in 1967. Not wanting to let the rival league gain an advantage, the USA decided to launch early. Not having secured any player contracts, the league imported teams from Europe, Brazil, and Uruguay to represent the franchise cities. Uruguayan team C.A. Cerro was brought in to play as the Skyliners.

The Skyliners opened the season at home against the Toronto City (Note: The Scottish team Hibernian F.C. had been brought over to represent Toronto) in a 1 - 1 draw in front of crowd of 21,871. The New York Skyliners finished the season fifth place with a record of 2 wins, 6 ties and 4 losses while drawing an average home league attendance of 8,766.

Following the 1967 season the United Soccer Association and the National Professional Soccer League merged to form the North American Soccer League. It was announced that New York would be one of the 20-teams in play in the North American Soccer League (NASL). The merged league decided not to have two-team cities and both the owners of the NPSL's New York Generals and Skyliners stepped aside and the franchise right were awarded to Peter Elser, who had held a minority interest Generals. Elser's franchise retained the New York Generals' name and front office and the New York Skyliners effectively went out of existence.

== Colors and badge ==
While the New York Skyliners' home kits were all white, their away jerseys were the same blue and white stripes as C.A. Cerro's home kits.

== Stadium ==
The New York Skyliners played their home matches at Yankee Stadium.

== Players ==
=== Roster (1967) ===
Note: Flags indicate national team as defined under FIFA eligibility rules; some limited exceptions apply. Players may hold more than one non-FIFA nationality.

No.	Pos.	Nation	Player
1	GK	ARG	Osmar Miguelucci
2	MF	URU	Julio Dalmao
3	DF	URU	Juan Masnik
4	MF	URU	Francisco Cámera
5	DF	URU	Ruben González
7	FW	URU	Luis Fontura
8	FW	BRA	Benedicto Ribeiro
9	FW	URU	Luis Del Rio

No.	Pos.	Nation	Player
10	FW	URU	Oscar Martiarena
11	FW	URU	Rúben Bareño
12	GK	URU	Eduardo García
13	DF	URU	Hugo Cabral
14	MF	URU	Edil Manrique
15	FW	URU	Sergio Silva
16	FW	URU	Juan Pintos
17	FW	ARG	Luis Suárez

== Coach ==
- (Uruguay) Ondino Viera

== Year-by-year ==
Season	Regular season												Play-offs	Top scorer		
Season	League	Div	G	W	T	L	F	A	Pts	%	Pos	Attend.	Play-offs	Name	Gls	Pts
1967	USA	E	12	2	4	6	15	17	10	.417	5th	8,766	–	Benedicto Ribeiro	5	12

== Records ==
- League victory: 4-1 v Dallas Tornado, June 27, 1967
- League defeat: 0-2 v Washington Whips, June 7, 1967
