= Julio Dalmao =

Uruguayan footballer (1940–2026)

Personal information
- Full name: Julio César Dalmao Iglesias
- Date of birth: 5 May 1940
- Place of birth: Montevideo, Uruguay
- Date of death: 20 October 2026 (aged 86)
- Position: Defender

Senior career*
Years	Team	Apps	(Gls)
1959–1961	Cerro		
1961–1966	Vélez Sarsfield	87	(0)
1967	New York Skyliners		
- Cerro
1969–1971	Huracán Buceo		
1972	Nacional de Uruguay	10	(0)
- Rentistas

International career
1959–1968	Uruguay	11	(0)
- * Club domestic league appearances and goals

Julio César Dalmao Iglesias (5 May 1940 – 20 October 2026) was an Uruguayan professional footballer who played as a defender. He made eleven appearances for the Uruguay national team from 1959 and 1968. He was also part of Uruguay's squad for the 1959 South American Championship that took place in Ecuador. Dalmao died on 20 October 2026, at the age of 86.
