= Osmar Miguelucci =

Argentinian footballer (born 1941)

Osmar Abel Miguelucci (born 15 November 1941) is an Argentine former footballer who played as a goalkeeper for clubs in Argentina, Chile, Colombia, Peru, United States and Uruguay, as well as the Argentina national team at the 1963 Pan American Games in São Paulo, Brazil.

== Career ==
Born in Necochea, Miguelucci was raised in Mar del Plata and began playing football with San Lorenzo de Mar del Plata. He made his debut in the Argentine Primera División after joining Argentinos Juniors, where he would play from 1961 to 1966.

In 1971, Miguelucci was sent off after a remarkable series of events in a Primera B match between Temperley and his club, Almirante Brown. In the 13th minute, Temperley were awarded a penalty after Miguelucci fouled Horacio Corbalán in the area. Miguelucci saved Corbalán's first penalty attempt but the referee ordered another attempt because the goalkeeper left his line early. Nicolás Bieledinovich took the second attempt which Miguelucci saved, but he left his line early again and was issued a yellow card. The referee called for a third attempt, and Miguelucci left his line early yet again, prompting the referee to issue a second yellow and dismiss him from the match. A field player, Ricardo Tello, took over his goalkeeping duties and saved the fourth penalty attempt.

In 1977, Miguelucci was also involved in a remarkable relegation battle with Platense. The club won the relegation play-off with Lanús, where the match ended 0–0 and Platense won 8–7 on penalties, with Miguelucci saving four.

Miguelucci played for Argentina at the 1963 Pan American Games.

== Teams ==
- San Lorenzo 1959–1960
- Argentinos Juniors 1961–1966
- Cerro 1967
- New York Skyliners 1967
- Colón 1968–1970
- Junior 1970
- Almirante Brown 1971
- San Martín de Tucumán 1972
- Sport Boys 1973
- Deportes Concepción 1973–1974
- Deportivo Cali 1974
- Atlético Bucaramanga 1975
- Quilmes 1976
- Platense 1977
