= Sergio Silva (Uruguayan footballer) =

Uruguayan footballer

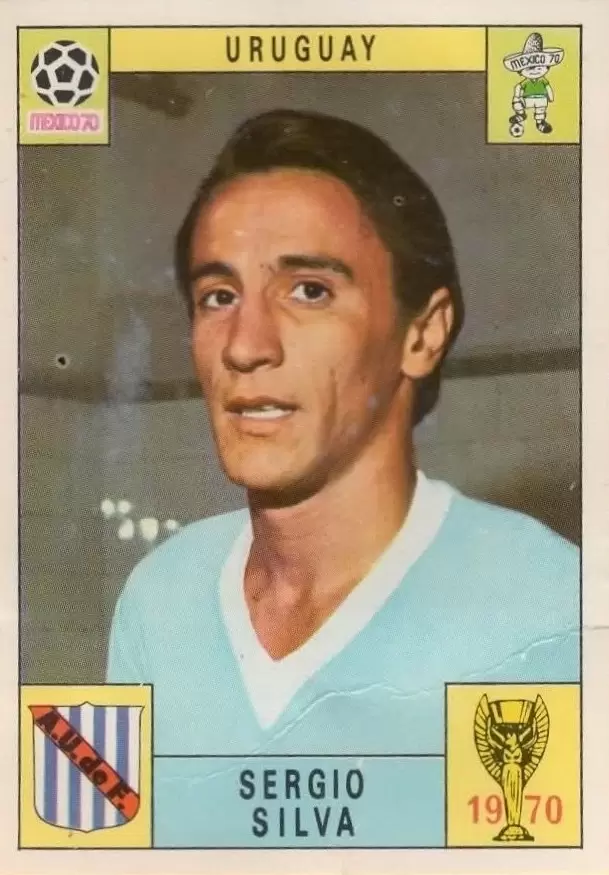

Personal information
- Place of birth: Uruguay
- Date of death: 26 August 2000 (aged 57)
- Place of death: Tampico, Mexico
- Position: Forward

Senior career*
Years	Team	Apps	(Gls)
–1969	Cerro		
1967	New York Skyliners	10	(3)
1970–1971	Toluca		
1972–1974	Torreón		
1974–1975	Curtidores		
1976–1977	San Luis	35	(6)
1977–1978	Tampico	25	(6)

International career
1969	Uruguay	2	(0)
- * Club domestic league appearances and goals

Sergio Silva (died 26 August 2000) was a Uruguayan footballer who played professionally in Mexico, United States and Uruguay.

== Career ==
Silva began playing football as a central forward in the Uruguayan Primera División. He played for C.A. Cerro and participated in the United Soccer Association with his Cerro teammates under the New York Skyliners franchise in 1967.

In 1970, Silva moved to Mexico, where he would spend the remainder of his playing career. He initially signed with Mexican Primera División side Deportivo Toluca, but joined Torreón in 1972. He moved to San Luis for the 1976–77 season and played for Tampico the next season after Tampico acquired San Luis' franchise.

Silva appeared in two 1970 FIFA World Cup qualifying matches for the Uruguay national football team during 1969.

== Personal ==
Silva's sons, Marcelo Silva Rigau and Sergio Silva Rigau, are a football manager and a professional football referee.
