= Peixinho =

Peixinho may refer to:

- Peixinho (Brazilian footballer) (born 1940)
- Peixinho (Portuguese footballer) (born 2004)
- Jorge Peixinho (1940–1995), Portuguese composer
- Peixinhos da horta, Portuguese fried vegetable dish
