= Roberto Frojuello =

Brazilian footballer (1937–2021)

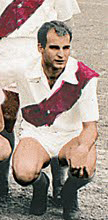
- Frojuello in 1961

Personal information
- Full name: Roberto Fernando Frojuello
- Date of birth: 8 November 1937
- Place of birth: São Paulo, Brazil
- Date of death: 29 January 2021 (aged 83)
- Position: Forward

Senior career*
Years	Team	Apps	(Gls)
1956	São Paulo		
1957–1958	Guarani		
1959–1960	São Paulo		
1961–1963	River Plate		
1964–1965	Colo-Colo		
1966	Palmeiras		

International career
	Brazil	2	(0)
- * Club domestic league appearances and goals

Roberto Fernando Frojuello (8 November 1937 – 29 January 2021), known as Roberto Frojuello, was a Brazilian footballer who played as a forward for clubs in Brazil, Argentina and Chile. He made two appearances for the Brazil national team.
