= 1964 Venezuelan Primera División season =

Venezuelan Primera División
- Season: 1964
- Champions: Deportivo Galicia (1st title)

The 1964 season of the Venezuelan Primera División, the top category of Venezuelan football, was played by 6 teams. The national champions were Galicia.

== Results ==
=== First stage ===
Pos	Team	Pld	W	D	L	GF	GA	GD	Pts
1	Deportivo Galicia	10	7	2	1	22	9	+13	16
2	Deportivo Italia	10	7	1	2	20	10	+10	15
3	Tiquire Flores	10	5	2	3	21	12	+9	12
4	Unión Deportiva Canarias	10	4	2	4	12	12	0	10
5	Deportivo Portugués	10	1	2	7	9	26	−17	4
6	La Salle	10	1	1	8	10	25	−15	3

=== Second stage ===
Pos	Team	Pld	W	D	L	GF	GA	GD	Pts
1	Tiquire Flores	10	6	1	3	21	13	+8	13
2	La Salle	10	5	2	3	16	14	+2	12
3	Deportivo Galicia	10	5	1	4	22	16	+6	11
4	Unión Deportiva Canarias	10	3	5	2	11	12	−1	11
5	Deportivo Portugués	10	3	4	3	11	12	−1	10
6	Deportivo Italia	10	1	1	8	7	21	−14	3

=== Aggregate Table ===
Pos	Team	Pld	W	D	L	GF	GA	GD	Pts
1	Deportivo Galicia	20	12	3	5	44	25	+19	27
2	Tiquire Flores	20	11	3	6	42	25	+17	25
3	Unión Deportiva Canarias	20	7	7	6	23	24	−1	21
4	Deportivo Italia	20	8	2	10	27	31	−4	18
5	Deportivo Portugués	20	4	6	10	20	38	−18	14
6	La Salle	20	6	3	11	26	39	−13	15

=== Championship play-off ===
Tiquire Flores	0 – 2	Deportivo Galicia

Deportivo Galicia	2 – 2	Tiquire Flores
