= Vicente Lecaro =

Ecuadorian footballer (1936–2023)

Personal information
- Full name: Jorge Vicente Lecaro Coronel
- Date of birth: 8 June 1936
- Place of birth: Guayaquil, Ecuador
- Date of death: 23 August 2023 (aged 87)
- Place of death: Guayaquil
- Position: Defender

Senior career*
Years	Team	Apps	(Gls)
1961	Barcelona SC		
1962	Emelec		
1963–1971	Barcelona SC		

International career
1963–1967	Ecuador	8	(0)
- * Club domestic league appearances and goals

Jorge Vicente Lecaro Coronel (8 June 1936 – 23 August 2023) was an Ecuadorian footballer who played as a defender. He made eight appearances for the Ecuador national team from 1963 to 1967. He was also part of Ecuador's squad for the 1963 South American Championship.

Lecaro died on 23 August 2023, at the age of 87.
