= Raúl Savoy =

Argentine footballer

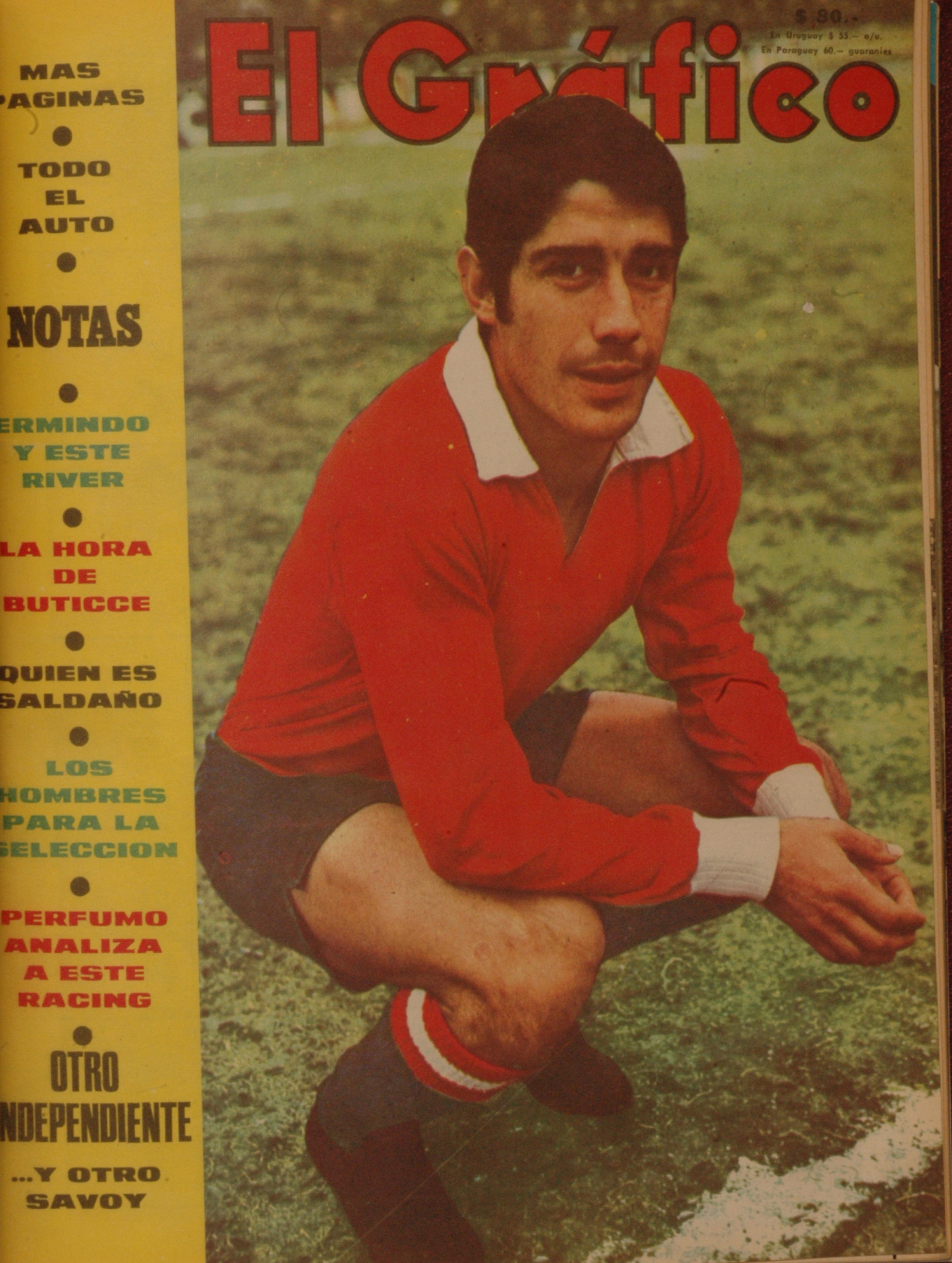

Personal information
- Full name: Raúl Armando Savoy
- Date of birth: 11 November 1940
- Place of birth: San Antonio de Areco, Argentina
- Date of death: 10 December 2003 (aged 63)
- Position: Midfielder

Senior career*
Years	Team	Apps	(Gls)
1959-1962	Chacarita Juniors		
1963-1968	Independiente		
1969-1971	Boca Juniors		
1972	Liverpool Montevideo		
1973	Miami Toros		

International career
1963–1968	Argentina	17	(8)
Medal record
Representing Argentina
Men's football
South American Championship
Third place	1963 Bolivia	Team
- * Club domestic league appearances and goals

Raúl Savoy (11 November 1940 – 10 December 2003) was an Argentine footballer. He played in 17 matches for the Argentina national football team from 1963 to 1968. He was also part of Argentina's squad for the 1963 South American Championship.

== Honours ==
Independiente

- Primera Division: 1967
- Copa Libertadores: 1964, 1965

Boca Juniors

- Primera Division: 1969, 1970
- Copa Argentina: 1969
