= Elgar Baeza =

Uruguayan footballer (1939–2020)

Personal information
- Date of birth: 8 November 1939
- Date of death: 8 September 2020 (aged 80)
- Position: Defender

International career
Years	Team	Apps	(Gls)
1965–1967	Uruguay	5	(0)

Elgar Baeza (8 November 1939 – 8 September 2020) was an Uruguayan footballer. He played in five matches for the Uruguay national football team from 1965 to 1967. He was also part of Uruguay's squad for the 1967 South American Championship. Baeza died on 8 September 2020, at the age of 80.
