= Ricardo Trigilli =

Argentine footballer (1934–2010)

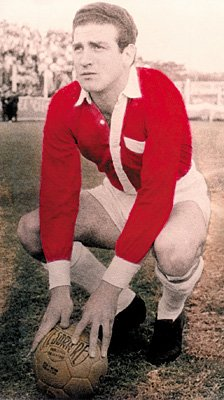
Trigilli in 1955

Ricardo Trigilli (24 August 1934 – 21 January 2010) was an Argentine footballer who played as a forward for clubs in Argentina and Chile.

== Teams ==
- Argentinos Juniors 1952–1958
- Vélez Sarsfield 1959–1960
- Universidad Católica 1961–1962
- Deportes La Serena 1963
- Ferrobádminton 1964
- San Telmo 1965

== Honours ==
Argentinos Juniors

- Argentine Second División Championship: 1955

Universidad Católica

- Chilean Primera División Championship: 1961
