= 1965 Copa Libertadores =

6th season of Copa Libertadores

1965 Copa Libertadores de América
Tournament details
- Dates: January 31 – April 15
- Teams: 10 (from 9 confederations)

Final positions
- Champions: (Argentina) Independiente (2nd title)
- Runners-up: (Uruguay) Peñarol

Tournament statistics
- Matches played: 26
- Goals scored: 83 (3.19 per match)
- Top scorer: (Brazil) Pelé (7 goals)

The 1965 Copa Libertadores de América was the sixth edition of South America's premier club football tournament. Colombia did not send a representative due to the disagreements between CONMEBOL and the Colombian football federation. This became the last edition of the tournament in which only the national champions of each association could participate.

After the victorious campaign the previous year, Independiente would go on to successfully defend the title after beating another Uruguayan team, this time Peñarol. Independiente began a legacy that saw it become a world class football team and paved the way for future conquests.

== Qualified teams ==
Country	Team	Qualification method
CONMEBOL; 1 berth	Independiente	1964 Copa Libertadores winners
Argentina; 1 berth	Boca Juniors	1964 Primera División champion
Bolivia; 1 berth	The Strongest	1964 Copa Simón Bolívar champion
Brazil; 1 berth	Santos	1964 Brasileiro Série A champion
Chile; 1 berth	Universidad de Chile	1964 Primera División champion
Ecuador; 1 berth	Deportivo Quito	1964 Campeonato Ecuatoriano champion
Paraguay; 1 berth	Guaraní	1964 Primera División champion
Peru; 1 berth	Universitario	1964 Primera División champion
Uruguay; 1 berth	Peñarol	1964 Primera División champion
Venezuela; 1 berth	Deportivo Galicia	1964 Primera División champion

== Tie-breaking criteria ==
The format of the competition remained nearly the same as the previous year's edition; the preliminary round was eliminated from this edition.

At each stage of the tournament teams receive 2 points for a win, 1 point for a draw, and no points for a loss. If two or more teams are equal on points, the following criteria will be applied to determine the ranking in the group stage:

1. a one-game playoff;
2. superior goal difference;
3. draw of lots.

== First round ==
Nine teams were drawn into three groups. In each group, teams played against each other home-and-away. The top team in each group advanced to the Semifinals. Independiente, the title holders, had a bye to the next round.

=== Group 1 ===
Pos	Team	Pld	W	D	L	GF	GA	GD	Pts	Qualification or relegation	(Argentina) BOC	(Bolivia) STR	(Ecuador) QUI
1	(Argentina) Boca Juniors	4	4	0	0	11	3	+8	8	Qualified to the Semifinals		2–0	4–0
2	(Bolivia) The Strongest	4	1	1	2	5	7	−2	3		2–3		2–2
3	(Ecuador) Deportivo Quito	4	0	1	3	3	9	−6	1		1–2	0–1	

Legend: Blue = home team win; Yellow = draw; Red = away team win.

January 31, 1965	Deportivo Quito (Ecuador)	0–1	(Bolivia) The Strongest	Quito
			Bonano

February 7, 1965	Deportivo Quito (Ecuador)	1–2	(Argentina) Boca Juniors	Quito
	Ordóñez		Rattín

February 14, 1965	The Strongest (Bolivia)	2–3	(Argentina) Boca Juniors	La Paz
	Morales; Quevedo		Menéndez; Silveira

February 21, 1965	The Strongest (Bolivia)	2–2	(Ecuador) Deportivo Quito	La Paz
	Vargas; Torres		Paucar; Galarraga

February 26, 1965	Boca Juniors (Argentina)	4–0	(Ecuador) Deportivo Quito	Buenos Aires
	Silveira; Moraes; Rojas; Simeone

March 5, 1965	Boca Juniors (Argentina)	2–0	(Bolivia) The Strongest	Buenos Aires
	Menéndez; Rojas

=== Group 2 ===
Pos	Team	Pld	W	D	L	GF	GA	GD	Pts	Qualification or relegation	(Brazil) SAN	(Chile) UC	(Peru) UNI
1	(Brazil) Santos	4	4	0	0	10	3	+7	8	Qualified to the Semifinals		1–0	2–1
2	Universidad de Chile	4	1	0	3	6	9	−3	2		1–5		5–2
3	(Peru) Universitario	4	1	0	3	5	9	−4	2		1–2	1–0	

Legend: Blue = home team win; Yellow = draw; Red = away team win.

February 13, 1965	Universidad de Chile	1–5	(Brazil) Santos	Santiago
	Araya		Pelé; Mengálvio; Pepe

February 19, 1965	Universitario (Peru)	1–2	(Brazil) Santos	Lima
	Calatayud		Peixinho

February 22, 1965	Universitario (Peru)	1–0	Universidad de Chile	Lima
	Fernández

February 26, 1965	Santos (Brazil)	1–0	Universidad de Chile	Pacaembu, São Paulo
	Pelé

March 6, 1965	Santos (Brazil)	2–1	(Peru) Universitario	Pacaembu, São Paulo
	Pelé; Pepe		Zavala

March 10, 1965	Universidad de Chile	5–2	(Peru) Universitario	Santiago
	Oleniak; Álvarez; Araya		Zavala; Guzmán

=== Group 3 ===
Pos	Team	Pld	W	D	L	GF	GA	GD	Pts	Qualification or relegation	(Uruguay) PEÑ	(Paraguay) GUA	(Venezuela) GAL
1	(Uruguay) Peñarol	4	3	0	1	5	2	+3	6	Qualified to the Semifinals		2–0	2–0
2	(Paraguay) Guaraní	4	3	0	1	6	5	+1	6		2–1		2–1
3	(Venezuela) Deportivo Galicia	4	0	0	4	2	6	−4	0		^{[A]}	1–2	

Legend: Blue = home team win; Yellow = draw; Red = away team win.

February 1, 1965	Deportivo Galicia (Venezuela)	1–2	(Paraguay) Guaraní	Caracas
	Danilo		Muñoz

February 8, 1965	Deportivo Galicia (Venezuela)	^{[A]}	(Uruguay) Peñarol	Caracas

February 25, 1965	Guaraní (Paraguay)	2–1	(Venezuela) Deportivo Galicia	Asunción
	González; Quiñones		Danilo

February 28, 1965	Peñarol (Uruguay)	2–0	(Venezuela) Deportivo Galicia	Montevideo
	Joya; Abbadie

March 7, 1965	Guaraní (Paraguay)	2–1	(Uruguay) Peñarol	Asunción
	González; Muñoz		Rocha

March 10, 1965	Peñarol (Uruguay)	2–0	(Paraguay) Guaraní	Montevideo
	Sasía; Silva

== Semifinals ==
Four teams were drawn into two groups. In each group, teams played against each other home-and-away. The top team in each group advanced to the Finals.

=== Group A ===
Pos	Team	Pld	W	D	L	GF	GA	GD	Pts	Qualification or relegation
1	(Argentina) Independiente	2	1	0	1	2	1	+1	2	Qualified to the Final
2	(Argentina) Boca Juniors	2	1	0	1	1	2	−1	2	

March 24, 1965	Independiente (Argentina)	2–0	(Argentina) Boca Juniors	Buenos Aires
	Mura; Rodríguez

March 28, 1965	Boca Juniors (Argentina)	1–0	(Argentina) Independiente	Buenos Aires
	Rojas

April 5, 1965 Playoff	Boca Juniors (Argentina)	0 – 0 (a.e.t.)	(Argentina) Independiente	Buenos Aires

Independiente progressed to the finals due to better goal difference.

=== Group B ===
Pos	Team	Pld	W	D	L	GF	GA	GD	Pts	Qualification or relegation
1	(Uruguay) Peñarol	2	1	0	1	7	7	0	2	Qualified to the Final
2	(Brazil) Santos	2	1	0	1	7	7	0	2	

March 25, 1965	Santos (Brazil)	5–4	(Uruguay) Peñarol	Santos
	Pelé; Dorval; Pepe		Rocha; Silva; Sasía

March 28, 1965	Peñarol (Uruguay)	3–2	(Brazil) Santos	Montevideo
	Silva; Sasía		Pepe; Coutinho

March 31, 1965 Playoff	Peñarol (Uruguay)	2–1	(Brazil) Santos	Buenos Aires
	Joya; Sasía		Pelé

== Finals ==
Pos	Team	Pld	W	D	L	GF	GA	GD	Pts
1	(Argentina) Independiente	2	1	0	1	2	3	−1	2
2	(Uruguay) Peñarol	2	1	0	1	3	2	+1	2

April 9, 1965	Independiente (Argentina)	1–0	(Uruguay) Peñarol	La Doble Visera, Avellaneda
	Bernao 83'			Attendance: 45,000; Referee: Arturo Yamasaki (Peru)

April 12, 1965	Peñarol (Uruguay)	3–1	(Argentina) Independiente	Estadio Centenario, Montevideo
	Gonçalves 14'; Reznik 43'; Rocha 46'		de la Mata II 88'	Attendance: 45,000; Referee: Arturo Yamasaki (Peru)

April 15, 1965 Playoff	Peñarol (Uruguay)	1–4	(Argentina) Independiente	Estadio Nacional, Santiago
	Joya 44'		Pérez 10'; Bernao 27'; Avallay 33'; Mura 82'	Attendance: 40,000; Referee: Arturo Yamasaki (Peru)

== Champion ==
Copa Libertadores de América
1965 Champion

Independiente
Second Title

== Top goalscorers ==
Pos	Player	Team	Goals
1	(Brazil) Pelé	(Brazil) Santos	8
2	(Uruguay) Pedro Rocha	(Uruguay) Peñarol	4
2	(Uruguay) José Francisco Sasía	(Uruguay) Peñarol	4
2	(Uruguay) Héctor Jesús Silva	(Uruguay) Peñarol	4
2	(Brazil) Pepe	(Brazil) Santos	4

== Footnotes ==
A. Points were taken from Deportivo Galicia due to irregularities in their line-up. Peñarol was awarded the points. Peñarol advanced due to goal difference.
