= Raúl Bernao =

Argentine footballer (1941–2007)

Raúl Emilio Bernao
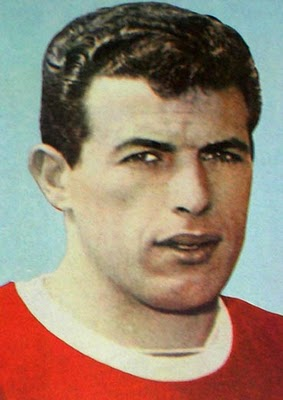
- Bernao in 1970

Personal information
- Full name: Raúl Emilio Bernao
- Date of birth: November 4, 1941
- Place of birth: Sarandí, Argentina
- Date of death: December 26, 2007 (aged 66)
- Position: Midfielder

Senior career*
Years	Team	Apps	(Gls)
1961–1970	Independiente	241	(40)
1971–1973	Deportivo Cali		
1974	Gimnasia de La Plata	10	(1)

International career
1965–1970	Argentina	15	(4)
- * Club domestic league appearances and goals

Raúl Bernao (4 November 1941 – 26 December 2007) was an Argentine footballer. He played most of his career for Club Atlético Independiente winning a number of major titles, he also played for the Argentina national football team 15 times.

== Career ==
Bernao started his career with Independiente in 1961, he was part of the squad that won the 1963 championship. In 1964, he helped Independiente to become the first Argentine team to win the Copa Libertadores and the club retained the title in 1965.

In 1967, Independiente were the first team to win the Nacional and in 1970 they won the Metropolitano.

Bernao left Independiente to join Colombian team Deportivo Cali in 1971, he played for the club until the end of 1973. He returned to Argentina to join Gimnasia y Esgrima La Plata in 1974, but retired at the age of 33 after only playing in 10 Primera matches for Gimnasia.

Bernao appeared for the Argentina national football team in two editions of the Copa América.

== Titles ==
Season	Team	Title
1963	Independiente	Primera División Argentina
1964	Independiente	Copa Libertadores
1965	Independiente	Copa Libertadores
Nacional 1967	Independiente	Primera División Argentina
Metropolitano 1970	Independiente	Primera División Argentina
