= Pedro Gando =

Ecuadorian footballer (1936–2012)

Personal information
- Full name: Pedro Armando Gando Sáenz
- Date of birth: 20 July 1936
- Place of birth: Guayaquil, Ecuador
- Date of death: 1 August 2012 (aged 76)

International career
Years	Team	Apps	(Gls)
1963	Ecuador	6	(0)

Pedro Gando (20 July 1936 – 1 August 2012) was an Ecuadorian footballer who played as a midfielder. He played in six matches for the Ecuador national football team in 1963. He was also part of Ecuador's squad for the 1963 South American Championship.
