= 1961 Campeonato Nacional Primera División =

Campeonato Nacional de Fútbol Profesional
- Dates: 27 May 1961 – 5 January 1962
- Champions: Universidad Católica (3rd title)
- Relegated: none
- Copa de Campeones: Universidad Católica
- Matches: 184
- Goals: 684 (3.72 per match)
- Top goalscorer: Carlos Campos (24); Honorino Landa (24)
- Biggest home win: Universidad Católica 7–1 Palestino (1 October)
- Highest attendance: 54,811 Universidad Católica 0–0 Universidad de Chile (30 December)
- Total attendance: 1,193,908
- Average attendance: 6,488

The 1961 Campeonato Nacional de Fútbol Profesional, was the 29th season of top-flight football in Chile. Universidad Católica won their third title following a 3–2 win against Universidad de Chile in the championship play-off on 5 January 1962, also qualifying for the 1962 Copa de Campeones.

== Final table ==
Pos	Team	Pld	W	D	L	GF	GA	GD	Pts	Qualification or relegation
1	Universidad Católica	26	15	8	3	69	35	+34	38	Qualified for the Championship play-off
2	Universidad de Chile	26	13	12	1	55	28	+27	38	Qualified for the Championship play-off
3	Colo-Colo	26	13	9	4	80	47	+33	35	
4	Santiago Morning	26	12	9	5	52	34	+18	33	
5	Everton	26	11	9	6	45	40	+5	31	
6	Santiago Wanderers	26	11	5	10	46	49	−3	27	
7	O'Higgins	26	11	4	11	41	40	+1	26	
8	Unión Española	26	10	6	10	51	55	−4	26	
9	Palestino	26	11	3	12	47	60	−13	25	
10	Ferrobádminton	26	7	8	11	38	52	−14	22	
11	Audax Italiano	26	7	7	12	46	57	−11	21	
12	Green Cross	26	4	7	15	39	56	−17	15	
13	San Luis	26	5	5	16	36	58	−22	15	
14	Rangers	26	2	8	16	31	65	−34	12	Relegated 1962 Segunda División de Chile (later revoked)

== Results ==
Home \ Away	AUD	COL	EVE	FEB	GCR	OHI	PAL	RAN	SLU	SMO	UES	UCA	UCH	SWA
Audax		4–3	2–7	1–1	5–0	1–2	2–4	2–0	1–1	2–0	3–1	0–2	1–6	1–3
Colo-Colo	7–2		6–2	1–1	1–3	5–3	3–2	1–1	3–0	3–3	3–3	3–0	1–1	2–3
Everton	2–1	0–4		1–3	1–1	0–0	1–0	3–2	1–0	2–0	1–0	2–3	2–1	1–3
Ferrobádminton	2–0	2–2	1–3		2–1	0–2	1–2	2–1	2–2	2–3	0–3	3–3	1–1	0–1
Green Cross	1–3	2–3	2–2	4–4		4–3	5–2	2–2	4–1	2–3	1–1	2–5	1–3	0–2
O'Higgins	2–1	2–1	1–1	0–1	0–0		3–0	0–0	3–1	2–0	0–3	1–4	0–1	2–1
Palestino	2–1	5–7	1–3	1–1	2–1	3–1		2–0	4–1	2–1	2–0	2–1	2–4	2–1
Rangers	3–3	2–2	0–2	0–1	1–0	0–3	1–1		2–4	1–1	4–4	0–4	2–6	4–2
San Luis	1–1	0–4	1–1	2–3	1–0	2–3	2–1	3–2		2–4	1–3	0–3	0–1	6–1
S. Morning	0–0	1–4	1–1	2–0	3–1	4–1	3–0	6–2	3–1		4–1	1–1	0–0	1–1
U. Española	3–2	0–4	2–1	4–1	2–1	1–0	2–5	2–0	2–2	1–3		2–3	1–1	2–1
U. Católica	1–1	2–4	2–2	4–1	1–1	2–1	7–1	4–1	2–1	2–2	5–2		0–0	4–1
U. de Chile	2–1	2–2	1–1	6–2	2–0	3–2	3–3	3–0	1–0	0–0	4–4	0–0		2–1
S. Wanderers	3–3	1–1	2–2	3–1	1–0	1–4	3–0	2–0	4–1	0–3	3–2	1–4	1–1	

Legend: Blue = home team win; Yellow = draw; Red = away team win.

== Championship play-off ==
2 January 1962

Universidad de Chile	1 – 1	Universidad Católica
Sepúlveda 64'		79' Fouilloux

Estadio Nacional, Santiago
Attendance: 45,414
Referee: A. Tejada
5 January 1962

Universidad Católica	3 – 2	Universidad de Chile
Fouilloux 4', 86' (pen.); Ibáñez 47'		3', 16' Campos

Estadio Nacional, Santiago
Attendance: 54,009
Referee: L. Ventre

== Title ==
Campeonato Profesional
1961 champion
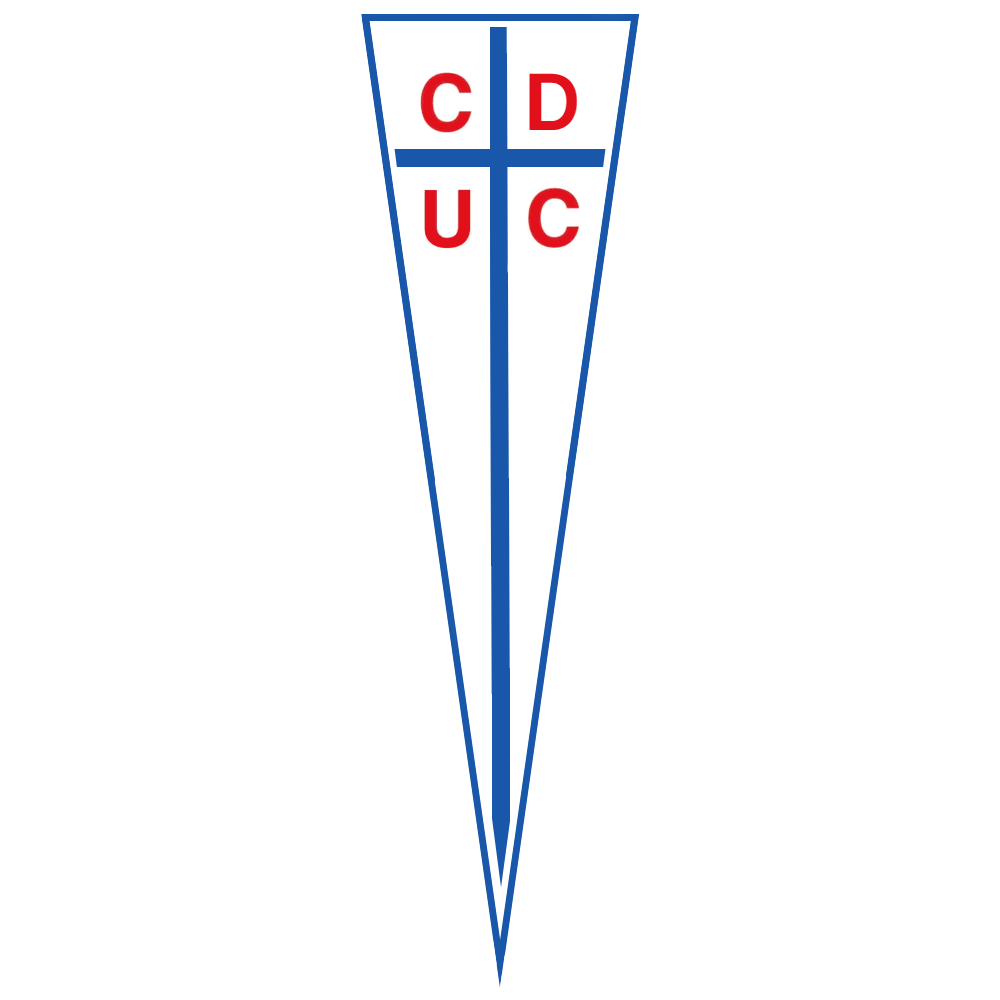
Universidad Católica
3rd title

== Topscorers ==
Name	Team	Goals
(Chile) Carlos Campos	Universidad de Chile	24
(Chile) Honorino Landa	Unión Española	24

== See also ==
- 1961 Copa Chile Green Cross
