= 1963 Argentine Primera División =

72nd season of top-tier football league in Argentina

Primera División
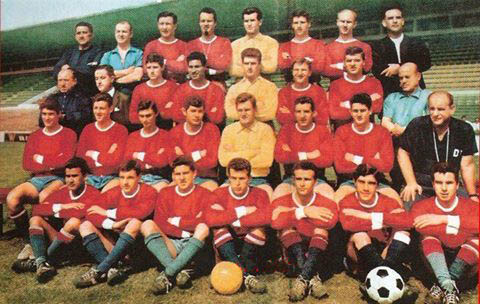
- Independiente, champion
- Season: 1963
- Champions: Independiente (7th title)
- Promoted: Banfield
- Relegated: (none)
- 1964 Copa Libertadores: Independiente
- Top goalscorer: (Argentina) Luis Artime (24 goals)

The 1963 Argentine Primera División was the 72nd season of top-flight football in Argentina. The season began on April 28 and ended on November 24.

Independiente won its 7th championship, with no teams relegated so the relegation was suspended. Therefore Estudiantes de la Plata (the last of the table by average system) was saved.

== League standings ==
| Pos | Team | Pld | W | D | L | GF | GA | GD | Pts |
|---|---|---|---|---|---|---|---|---|---|
| 1 | Independiente | 26 | 14 | 9 | 3 | 53 | 25 | +28 | 37 |
| 2 | River Plate | 26 | 13 | 9 | 4 | 48 | 23 | +25 | 35 |
| 3 | Racing | 26 | 11 | 8 | 7 | 43 | 32 | +11 | 30 |
| 3 | Boca Juniors | 26 | 12 | 6 | 8 | 30 | 29 | +1 | 30 |
| 5 | Atlanta | 26 | 12 | 4 | 10 | 35 | 37 | −2 | 28 |
| 6 | Huracán | 26 | 8 | 11 | 7 | 36 | 31 | +5 | 27 |
| 7 | Banfield | 26 | 7 | 11 | 8 | 36 | 27 | +9 | 25 |
| 7 | San Lorenzo | 26 | 9 | 7 | 10 | 37 | 46 | −9 | 25 |
| 9 | Estudiantes (LP) | 26 | 9 | 6 | 11 | 37 | 43 | −6 | 24 |
| 10 | Rosario Central | 26 | 6 | 10 | 10 | 34 | 43 | −9 | 22 |
| 10 | Argentinos Juniors | 26 | 5 | 12 | 9 | 28 | 43 | −15 | 22 |
| 12 | Gimnasia y Esgrima (LP) | 26 | 7 | 7 | 12 | 33 | 41 | −8 | 21 |
| 13 | Vélez Sársfield | 26 | 5 | 10 | 11 | 32 | 44 | −12 | 20 |
| 14 | Chacarita Juniors | 26 | 4 | 10 | 12 | 25 | 43 | −18 | 18 |
