= Vladas Douksas =

Uruguayan footballer (1933–2007)

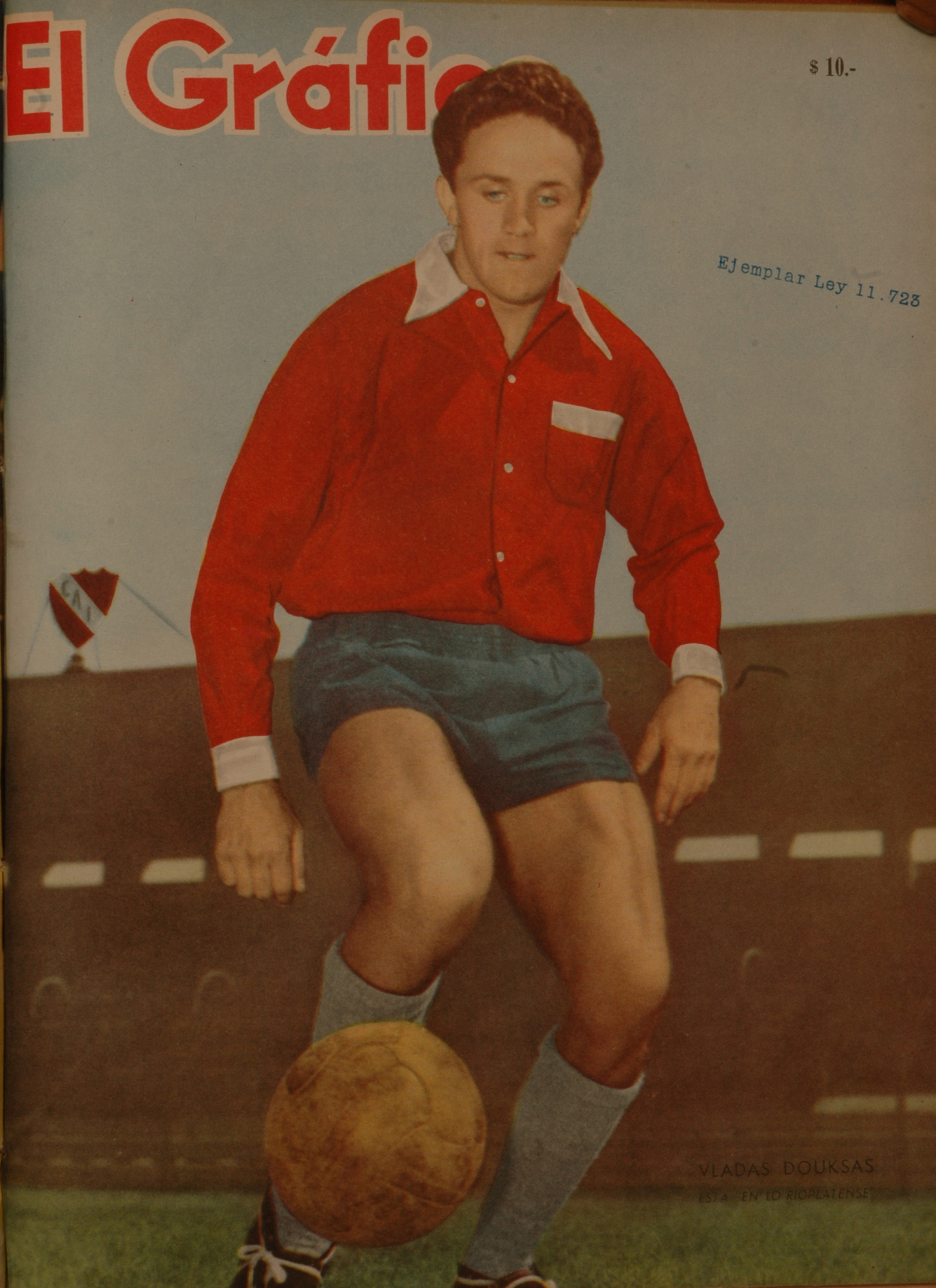
- Douksas in 1960

Personal information
- Full name: Vladas Douksas Klimite
- Date of birth: 14 March 1933
- Place of birth: Montevideo, Uruguay
- Date of death: 23 November 2007 (aged 74)
- Position: Midfielder

Senior career*
Years	Team	Apps	(Gls)
1950–1953	Fénix		
1953–1959	Rampla Juniors	152	(33)
1960–1961	Independiente	33	(5)
1961–1965	Nacional	79	(11)
1966	Danubio		
1967	Colón	11	(1)

International career
1959–1966	Uruguay	33	(3)
- * Club domestic league appearances and goals

Vladas Douksas Klimite (Lithuanian: Doukšas, 14 March 1933 – 23 November 2007) was an Uruguayan footballer. Douksas played in the Uruguayan and Argentine leagues during the 1950s and 1960s and played in a South American Championship-winning Uruguay team in 1959.

== Biography ==
Douksas was born 1933 in Montevideo to Vaclav (originally Vaclovas) and Emilia (originally Emilija), both Lithuanian immigrants, and was brought up in the suburb of Capurro. The Lithuanian version of his name is Vladas Doukšas Klimaitis. His father had worked for a chemical company before opening a small shop of his own.

=== Playing career ===
==== Club ====
Douksas signed for Centro Atlético Fénix as a seventeen-year-old in 1950. In 1953 he transferred to Rampla Juniors where he played until 1959. In 1960 Douksas transferred to Independiente in Argentina where he won the Argentine league championship. On arriving back in Uruguay Douksas was signed by Nacional. At Nacional he played in the team that lost in the final of the Copa Libertadores to his former club Independiente. After his stint at Nacional Douksas was signed by Danubio. In 1967, he was lured back to Argentina by Colón. His stay at Colón was short however, as he became homesick. He returned to Uruguay and retired shortly afterwards.

==== International career ====
Douksas made his debut for the Uruguay national football team in March 1959. He played six games at the first 1959 South American Championship tournament, scoring three goals. Despite his efforts Uruguay finished six out of seven nations. He then played four matches on the Uruguay team that won in the second 1959 South American Championship Ecuador. Douksas played his final match for la Celeste in June 1966 having played 33 times, scoring three goals.

== Honours ==
=== Club ===
Independiente

- Primera División Argentina: 1960

Nacional

- Copa Libertadores runner-up: 1964

=== International ===
Uruguay

- South American Championship: 1959 (2nd tournament)
