= Mario Méndez (Uruguayan footballer) =

Uruguayan footballer (1938–2020)

Personal information
- Full name: Mario Omar Méndez
- Date of birth: 11 May 1938
- Date of death: 1 July 2020 (aged 82)
- Place of death: Uruguay
- Position: Defender

International career
Years	Team	Apps	(Gls)
1959–1968	Uruguay	23	(3)

Mario Omar Méndez (11 May 1938 – 1 July 2020) was an Uruguayan footballer. He played in 23 matches for the Uruguay national football team from 1959 and 1968. He participated in the 1962 FIFA World Cup. He was also part of Uruguay's squad for the 1959 South American Championship that took place in Ecuador.

Méndez died in Uruguay on 1 July 2020, at the age of 82.
