= Domingo Pérez (footballer) =

Uruguayan footballer (1936–2024)

Personal information
- Full name: Domingo Salvador Pérez Silva
- Date of birth: 7 June 1936
- Place of birth: Paysandú, Uruguay
- Date of death: August 2024 (aged 88)
- Position: Forward

Senior career*
Years	Team	Apps	(Gls)
1957–1961	Rampla Juniors		
1961	River Plate (Argentina)	22	(6)
1961–1967	Nacional		

International career
1959–1967	Uruguay		
Medal record
Men's football
Representing Uruguay
Copa América
Gold medal – first place	1959 Ecuador	Team
Gold medal – first place	1967 Uruguay	Team
- * Club domestic league appearances and goals

Domingo Salvador Pérez Silva (7 June 1936 – August 2024) was a Uruguayan football forward who played for Uruguay in the 1962 and 1966 FIFA World Cups. He also played for Club Nacional de Football. Pérez died in August 2024, at the age of 88.
