= Luis Suárez (Argentine footballer) =

Argentine footballer

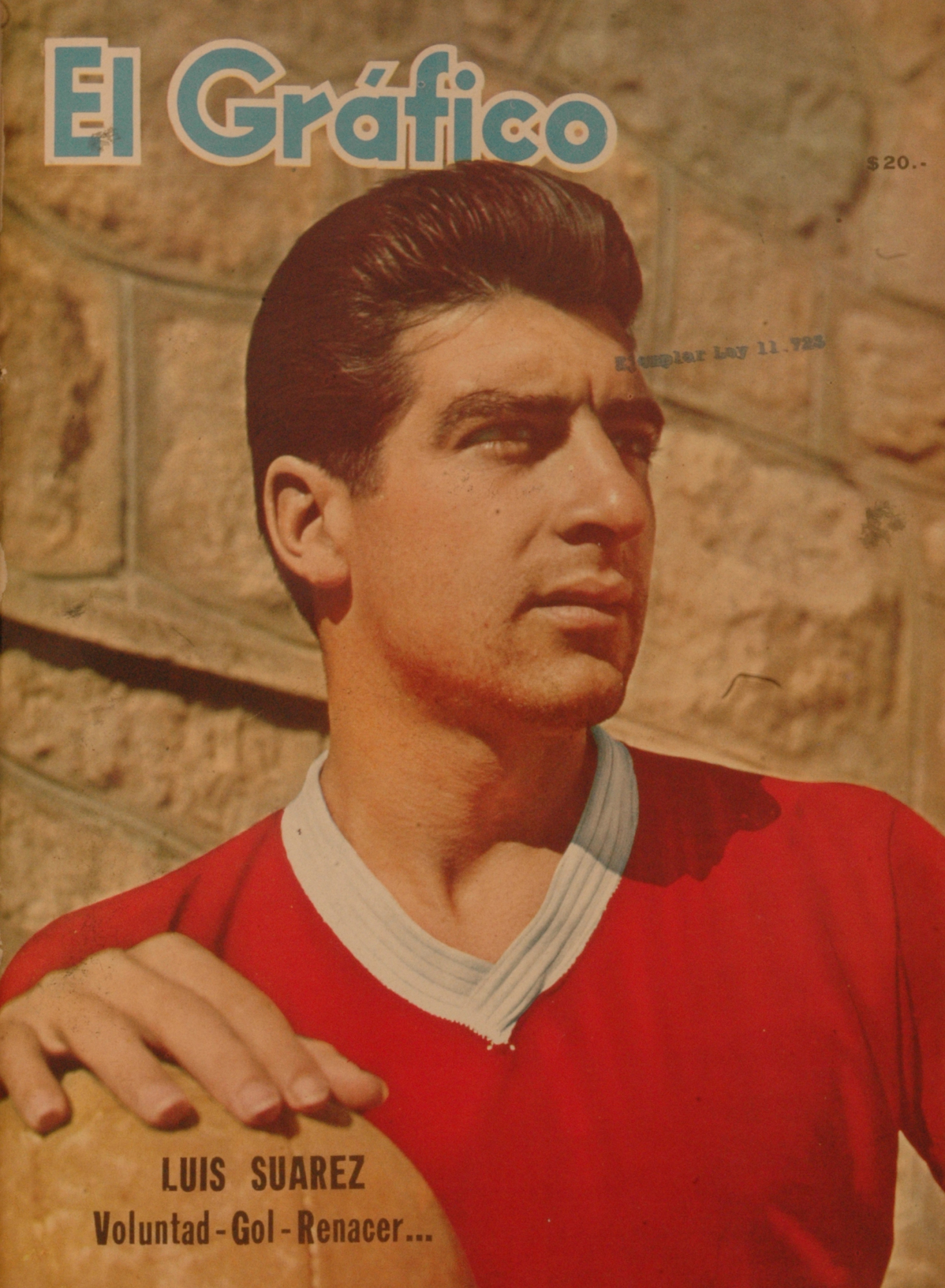

Personal information
- Full name: Luis Eduardo Suárez
- Date of birth: 15 July 1938
- Place of birth: Adrogué, Argentina
- Date of death: 20 June 2005 (aged 66)
- Height: 1.73 m (5 ft 8 in)
- Position: Forward

Senior career*
Years	Team	Apps	(Gls)
1952–1960	Banfield	87	(67)
1961–1965	Independiente		
1966	Huracán	2	(0)
1967	Cerro		
1967	New York Skyliners		
1968	Rangers de Talca	21	(4)

International career
1962	Argentina	2	(0)
- * Club domestic league appearances and goals

Luis Eduardo Suárez (15 July 1938 – 20 June 2005) was an Argentine professional footballer who played as a forward.

== Career ==
He was capped by the Argentina national team twice in 1962. He also played in the United States for the New York Skyliners.

His last club was Rangers de Talca in the 1968 Chilean Primera División.

== Career statistics ==
=== International ===
National team	Year	Apps	Goals
Argentina	1962	2	0
Total		2	0
