= Football records and statistics in Uruguay =

This page details football records in Uruguay.

== Most successful clubs overall ==
Club	Domestic Titles								South America Titles							Intercontinental Titles				Overall titles
Club	L	A	C	I	SC	CU	Other national titles (Note: Includes: Copa de Competencia (Uruguay); Copa de Honor (Uruguay); Torneo Competencia; Torneo de Honor; Torneo Cuadrangular (Uruguay); Campeonato Nacional General Artigas; Liguilla Pre-Libertadores de América; Liga Mayor (Uruguay); Torneo Clasificatorio; Copa Albion; Copa León Peyrou; Copa Serrato; Torneo Campeones Sudamericanos Juveniles; Torneo Fermín Garicoits; Campeonato Especial; Campeonato Relámpago; Torneo de Copa; Torneo Ciudad de Montevideo; Torneo 50º Aniversario de Colombes; Torneo Campeones Olímpicos; Campeonato Cuadrangular Eliminatorio; Torneo de la República; Torneo Colombes; Campeonato Montevideo; Copa de Oro; Campeonato Estadio Centenario; Torneo 60º Aniversario de Colombes; Campeonato Presentación; Campeonato Especial Comisión Nacional de Educación Física; Torneo Integración; Torneo Preparación; Copa de Honor Celeste Olímpica; Copa Integración.)	Total	CL	RS	CEG	CA	CHC	TC	Total	ICS	IC	CI	Total	Overall titles
Nacional	50	12	8	5	3	-	68	146	3	1	1	6	4	2	17	-	3	2	5	168
Peñarol	52	7	12	1	3	1	64	140	5	-	-	1	3	1	10	1	3	-	4	154
Defensor	4	4	4	-	-	3	10	25	-	-	-	-	-	-	-	-	-	-	-	25
Wanderers	3	-	1	-	-	-	13	17	-	-	-	-	1	3	4	-	-	-	-	21
Danubio	4	3	3	-	-	-	4	14	-	-	-	-	-	-	-	-	-	-	-	14
Liverpool	1	2	2	2	3	-	1	11	-	-	-	-	-	-	-	-	-	-	-	11
River Plate FC	4	-	-	-	-	-	1	5	-	-	-	-	1	-	1	-	-	-	-	6
Rampla Juniors	1	-	-	-	-	-	4	5	-	-	-	-	-	-	-	-	-	-	-	5
Bella Vista	1	-	-	-	-	-	2	3	-	-	-	-	-	-	-	-	-	-	-	3
Cerro	-	-	-	-	-	-	3	3	-	-	-	-	-	-	-	-	-	-	-	3
Central Español	1	-	-	-	-	-	1	2	-	-	-	-	-	-	-	-	-	-	-	2
Progreso	1	-	-	-	-	-	1	2	-	-	-	-	-	-	-	-	-	-	-	2
Plaza Colonia	-	1	1	-	-	-	-	2	-	-	-	-	-	-	-	-	-	-	-	2
CA River Plate	-	-	-	-	-	-	2	2	-	-	-	-	-	-	-	-	-	-	-	2
Fénix	-	-	-	-	-	-	2	2	-	-	-	-	-	-	-	-	-	-	-	2
Universal	-	-	-	-	-	-	2	2	-	-	-	-	-	-	-	-	-	-	-	2
Rentistas	-	1	-	-	-	-	-	1	-	-	-	-	-	-	-	-	-	-	-	1
Rocha	-	1	-	-	-	-	-	1	-	-	-	-	-	-	-	-	-	-	-	1
Sud América	-	-	-	-	-	-	1	1	-	-	-	-	-	-	-	-	-	-	-	1
