= Pierre Webó =

Cameroonian footballer and manager (born 1982)

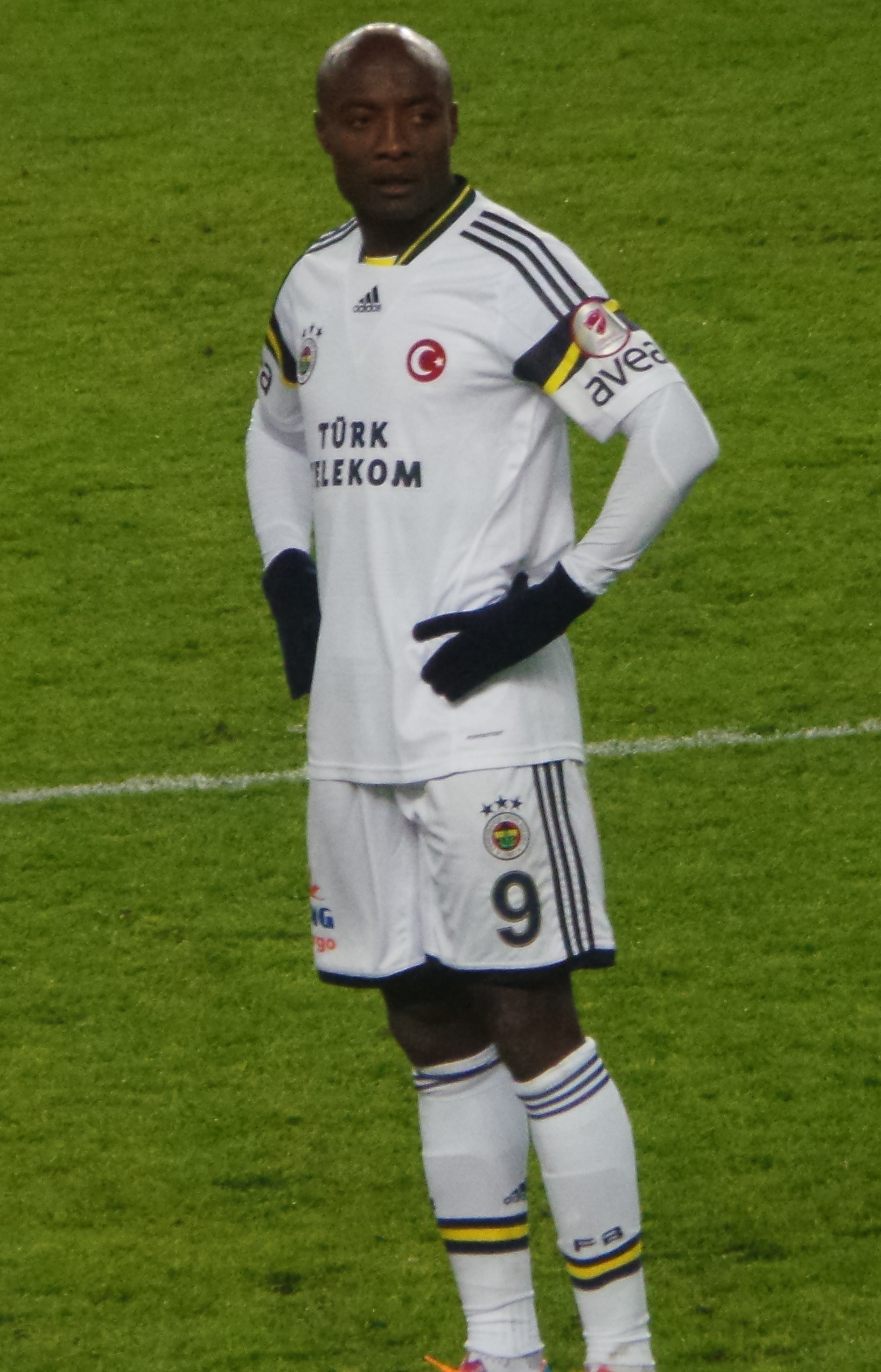
- Webó playing for Fenerbahçe in 2013

Personal information
- Full name: Pierre Achille Webó Kouamo
- Date of birth: 20 January 1982 (age 44)
- Place of birth: Bafoussam, Cameroon
- Height: 1.80 m (5 ft 11 in)
- Position: Striker

Youth career
- Kouogat

Senior career*
Years	Team	Apps	(Gls)
1999–2000	Real Banjul		
2000–2002	Nacional	31	(14)
2003–2007	Osasuna	114	(20)
2003	→ Leganés (loan)	7	(0)
2007–2011	Mallorca	113	(27)
2011–2013	İstanbul Başakşehir	48	(22)
2013–2015	Fenerbahçe	65	(24)
2015–2017	Osmanlıspor	49	(15)
2017–2018	Gazişehir	24	(7)
2018	Nacional	2	(0)
Total		453	(129)

International career
2003–2014	Cameroon	58	(19)

Managerial career
- 2019–2023: İstanbul Başakşehir (assistant)
- * Club domestic league appearances and goals

Pierre Achille Webó Kouamo (born 20 January 1982) is a Cameroonian former professional footballer who played as a striker.

He spent eight years of his career in La Liga, totalling 227 matches for Osasuna and Mallorca and scoring 47 goals (in Spain he also represented Leganés). He also played in Uruguay and Turkey.

A Cameroon international in the 2000s, Webó appeared with the country in two World Cups and as many Africa Cup of Nations.

== Club career ==
=== Early career ===
Born in Bafoussam, West Region, Webó started his professional career in Uruguay, playing three years with Club Nacional de Football, winning two Primera División titles – although he only was an important first-team member in his third season – and becoming top scorer of the 2002 edition of the Copa Sudamericana.

He moved to Europe in January 2003, signing with Segunda División club CD Leganés in the outskirts of Madrid, on loan from CA Osasuna.

=== Osasuna ===
In the summer of 2003, Webó returned to Osasuna, for whom he scored six goals in the 2005–06 campaign, being instrumental in the Navarrese side's fourth La Liga place and qualification for the UEFA Champions League, although they would ultimately be ousted by Hamburger SV prior to the group stage.

Webó's 2006–07 pre-season was hampered after he was forced to undergo treatment for malaria, but he went on to produce similar numbers in the league, adding two goals in nine games in the team's semi-final run in the UEFA Cup, including the match's only in a home tie against Rangers.

=== Mallorca ===
Webó moved to RCD Mallorca in 2007, spending most of his first season on the sidelines with an injury. He did manage five league goals.

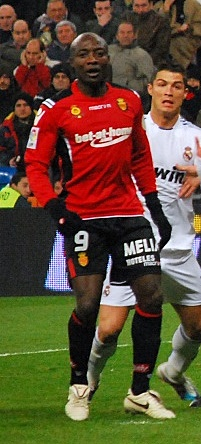
Webó in action for Mallorca in 2011

Following Dani Güiza's departure, Webó's importance increased, and he totalled 22 goals the following three seasons, netting six in 2009–10 as the Balearic Islands team finished fifth and qualified for the Europa League (later revoked).

In the 2011 off-season, after scoring 11 times during the campaign, with Mallorca narrowly avoiding relegation, Webó announced he would sign a new contract only if he was offered a three-year extension. In August, however, he asked to be relieved from his obligations for personal reasons, and joined İstanbul Başakşehir F.K. in Turkey.

=== Turkey ===
On 11 September 2011, in the first round of the season, Webó scored on his official debut for his new club, a 2–0 home defeat of Galatasaray SK. On 31 January 2013, he signed a two-and-a-half-year deal with fellow Süper Lig side Fenerbahçe SK for €3 million. Again he found the net in the first competitive match with his new team, but in a 1–2 home loss to Sivasspor.

On 7 March 2013, Webó scored the game's only goal in a win at FC Viktoria Plzeň in the Europa League round of 16 (2–1 on aggregate). He added another the following round, through a penalty to open the 2–0 home victory over SS Lazio.

Webó played in his first derby match against Galatasaray on 12 May 2013, scoring twice to secure a 2–1 win. The game was marred by racist chants from Fenerbahçe fans, directed to opposing players Didier Drogba and Emmanuel Eboué.

From 2015 to 2018, Webó continued to compete in the country, with Osmanlıspor and Gazişehir Gaziantep FK (the latter club in the TFF First League).

=== Return to Nacional ===
In September 2018, the 36-year-old Webó returned to Nacional de Montevideo after 16 years. After only 59 minutes of play across two league appearances, he left before the start of the 2019 season.

== International career ==
An international since 2003, Webó's first highlight playing for the Cameroon national team was a hat-trick in his country's 3–2 win in Ivory Coast in the 2006 FIFA World Cup qualifiers, but his team would not travel to Germany, precisely at the hands of that opponent.

Webó scored in a 3–1 friendly loss against Portugal on 1 June 2010, and started in the first two games at that year's FIFA World Cup in South Africa (both ending in defeat), with the player not managing to find the net.

Webó was called up for the Africa Cup of Nations in 2006 and 2010, as well as the 2014 FIFA World Cup, but did not score in any tournament; however, at the latter continental tournament he set up both goals as a substitute in a draw with Tunisia that saw his team into the quarter-finals. On 17 November 2013, he was among the scorers in a 4–1 playoff victory over the same opponents that took Cameroon to the World Cup in Brazil.

== Managerial career ==
After retiring, Webó joined İstanbul Başakşehir's coaching staff under Okan Buruk. In a Champions League group stage fixture against Paris Saint-Germain FC on 8 December 2020, he accused he was the target of racism by Romanian fourth official Sebastian Colțescu. The latter had allegedly used a term (negru, meaning black in Romanian), similar to a taboo racial slur in some western European countries but without the racial connotations, when describing and pointing out Webó to the main referee Ovidiu Hațegan; the incident, which occurred in the first half, ultimately led to the match being postponed, while UEFA also opened an investigation on the matter.

== Personal life ==
Webó's cousin Geremi was a long-time international teammate for Cameroon.

== Career statistics ==
=== Club ===
Club	Season	League			Cup		Continental		Other		Total	
Club	Season	Division	Apps	Goals	Apps	Goals	Apps	Goals	Apps	Goals	Apps	Goals
Nacional	2000	Uruguayan Primera División	2	0	—		—		1 (Note: Appearances in Copa Mercosur)	0	3	0
Nacional	2001	Uruguayan Primera División	7	1	—		3 (Note: Appearances in Copa Libertadores)	0	2	0	12	1
Nacional	2002	Uruguayan Primera División	22	13	—		6 (Note: Appearances in Copa Sudamericana)	4	—		28	17
Nacional	Total		31	14	—		9	4	3	0	43	18
Leganés (loan)	2002–03	Segunda División	7	0	—		—		—		7	0
Osasuna	2003–04	La Liga	28	4	3	3	—		—		31	7
Osasuna	2004–05	La Liga	24	6	4	0	—		—		28	6
Osasuna	2005–06	La Liga	31	6	1	0	2 (Note: Appearances in UEFA Europa League)	0	—		34	6
Osasuna	2006–07	La Liga	31	4	5	2	10 (Note: One appearance in UEFA Champions League, nine appearances in UEFA Europa League)	2	—		46	8
Osasuna	Total		114	20	13	5	12	2	—		139	27
Mallorca	2007–08	La Liga	15	5	—		—		—		15	2
Mallorca	2008–09	La Liga	33	5	6	0	—		—		39	5
Mallorca	2009–10	La Liga	31	6	1	0	—		—		32	6
Mallorca	2010–11	La Liga	34	11	2	1	—		—		36	12
Mallorca	Total		113	27	9	1	—		—		122	28
İstanbul Başakşehir	2011–12	Süper Lig	30	13	1	0	—		6 (Note: Appearances in Süper Lig Europa League playoffs)	2	37	15
İstanbul Başakşehir	2012–13	Süper Lig	18	9	1	0	—		—		19	9
İstanbul Başakşehir	Total		48	22	2	0	—		6	2	56	24
Fenerbahçe	2012–13	Süper Lig	13	7	3	1	6	2	—		22	10
Fenerbahçe	2013–14	Süper Lig	26	9	1	0	4 (Note: Appearances in UEFA Champions League)	1	1 (Note: Appearance in Turkish Super Cup)	0	32	10
Fenerbahçe	2014–15	Süper Lig	26	8	9	5	—		0	0	35	13
Fenerbahçe	Total		65	24	13	6	10	3	1	0	89	33
Osmanlıspor	2015–16	Süper Lig	20	6	1	0	—		—		21	6
Osmanlıspor	2016–17	Süper Lig	29	9	2	0	8	1	—		39	10
Osmanlıspor	Total		49	15	3	0	8	1	—		60	16
Gaziantep	2017–18	TFF First League	24	7	1	1	—		—		25	8
Nacional	2018	Uruguayan Primera División	2	0	—		0	0	—		2	0
Career Total			453	129	41	13	39	10	10	2	543	154

=== International ===
Appearances and goals by national team and year
National team	Year	Apps	Goals
Cameroon	2003	1	0
Cameroon	2004	3	0
Cameroon	2005	7	6
Cameroon	2006	7	2
Cameroon	2007	4	2
Cameroon	2008	6	0
Cameroon	2009	7	3
Cameroon	2010	10	4
Cameroon	2011	3	0
Cameroon	2012	2	0
Cameroon	2013	2	1
Cameroon	2014	6	1
Total		58	19

Scores and results list Cameroon goal tally first. The score column indicates the score after each Webó goal.

List of international goals scored by Pierre Webó
No.	Date	Venue	Opponent	Score	Result	Competition	Ref.
1	27 March 2005	Ahmadou Ahidjo Stadium, Yaoundé, Cameroon	Sudan	2–1	2–1	2006 FIFA World Cup qualification	
2	4 June 2005	Stade de l'Amitié, Cotonou, Benin	Benin	2–0	4–1	2006 FIFA World Cup qualification	
3	19 June 2005	Ahmadou Ahidjo Stadium, Yaoundé, Cameroon	Libya	1–0	1–0	2006 FIFA World Cup qualification	
4	4 September 2005	Felix Houphouet Boigny Stadium, Abidjan, Ivory Coast	Ivory Coast	1–0	3–2	2006 FIFA World Cup qualification	
5	4 September 2005	Felix Houphouet Boigny Stadium, Abidjan, Ivory Coast	Ivory Coast	2–1	3–2	2006 FIFA World Cup qualification	
6	4 September 2005	Felix Houphouet Boigny Stadium, Abidjan, Ivory Coast	Ivory Coast	3–2	3–2	2006 FIFA World Cup qualification	
7	16 August 2006	Stade Robert Diochon, Le Petit-Quevilly, France	Guinea	1–1	1–1	Friendly	
8	7 October 2006	Ahmadou Ahidjo Stadium, Yaoundé, Cameroon	Equatorial Guinea	2–0	3–0	2008 Africa Cup of Nations qualification	
9	24 March 2007	Ahmadou Ahidjo Stadium, Yaoundé, Cameroon	Liberia	1–0	3–1	2008 Africa Cup of Nations qualification	
10	24 March 2007	Ahmadou Ahidjo Stadium, Yaoundé, Cameroon	Liberia	2–1	3–1	2008 Africa Cup of Nations qualification	
11	12 August 2009	Wörthersee Stadion, Klagenfurt, Austria	Austria	1–0	2–0	Friendly	
12	12 August 2009	Wörthersee Stadion, Klagenfurt, Austria	Austria	2–0	2–0	Friendly	
13	14 November 2009	Fez Stadium, Fez, Morocco	Morocco	1–0	2–0	2010 FIFA World Cup qualification	
14	9 January 2010	Moi International Sports Centre, Kasarani, Kenya	Kenya	1–1	3–1	Friendly	
15	1 June 2010	Complexo Desportivo da Covilhã, Covilhã, Portugal	Portugal	1–2	1–3	Friendly	
16	5 June 2010	Partizan Stadium, Belgrade, Serbia	Serbia	1–0	3–4	Friendly	
17	5 June 2010	Partizan Stadium, Belgrade, Serbia	Serbia	2–1	3–4	Friendly	
18	17 November 2013	Ahmadou Ahidjo Stadium, Yaoundé, Cameroon	Tunisia	1–0	4–1	2014 FIFA World Cup qualification	
19	26 May 2014	Kufstein Arena, Kufstein, Austria	North Macedonia	1–0	2–0	Friendly	

== Honours ==
Nacional

- Uruguayan Primera División: 2001, 2002

Osasuna

- Copa del Rey runner-up: 2004–05

Fenerbahçe

- Süper Lig: 2013–14
- Turkish Cup: 2012–13
- Turkish Super Cup: 2014

Individual

- Copa Sudamericana Top Scorer: 2002
