= Rodrigo Casagrande =

Uruguayan footballer (born 1979)

Personal information
- Full name: Rodrigo Damian Casagrande
- Date of birth: February 15, 1979 (age 47)
- Place of birth: Montevideo, Uruguay
- Height: 1.85 m (6 ft 1 in)
- Position: Forward

Senior career*
Years	Team	Apps	(Gls)
1998-2000	Huracán Buceo		
2000	Cerro Porteño		
2001	Colón FC		
2002-2003	Nacional		
2003-2004	Montevideo Wanderers	21	(1)
2004-2006	Fénix	3	(0)
- * Club domestic league appearances and goals

Rodrigo Damian Casagrande (born February 15, 1979, in Montevideo, Uruguay) is a former Uruguayan footballer who has played as midfielder for clubs of Uruguay and Paraguay.

== Teams ==
- (Uruguay) Huracán Buceo 1998-2000
- (Paraguay) Cerro Porteño 2000
- (Uruguay) Colón FC 2001
- (Uruguay) Nacional 2002-2003
- (Uruguay) Montevideo Wanderers 2003-2004
- (Uruguay) Fénix 2004-2006
