= Torneo Ciudad de Montevideo =

- Organising body: AUF
- Founded: 1973
- Abolished: 1973; 52 years ago
- Region: Uruguay
- Most successful team(s): Nacional (1 title)

The Torneo Ciudad de Montevideo was a Uruguayan football tournament organized by the Uruguayan Football Association in 1973.

The twelve clubs from the Primera División and ten from the Segunda División participated in the tournament, making a total of 22 teams that would face each other between the months of May and July 1973.

== List of champions ==
Ed.	Year	Champion	Runner-up
1	1973	Nacional	Peñarol

== Titles by club ==
Club	Titles	Years won
Nacional	1	1973

== 1973 Torneo Ciudad de Montevideo ==
=== Qualified teams ===
The following teams qualified for the competition.

Serie A	Serie B
Bella Vista; Central Español; Cerro; Colón; Danubio; Fénix; Peñarol; River Plate; Salus; Sud América; Sportivo Italiano–El Tanque	Cerrito; Defensor Sporting; Huracán Buceo; Liverpool; Miramar Misiones; Nacional; Montevideo Wanderers; Progreso; Racing; Rampla Juniors; Rentistas

=== Final ===
22 July 1973	Nacional	2–1	Peñarol	Estadio Centenario
