= 1980 Campeonato Uruguayo Primera División =

77th season of the top-tier football league in Uruguay

Uruguayan Primera División
- Season: 1980
- Champions: Nacional (33rd title)

Statistics of Primera División Uruguaya for the 1980 season.

== Overview ==
It was contested by 14 teams, and Nacional won the championship.

== League standings ==
Pos	Team	Pld	W	D	L	GF	GA	GD	Pts
1	Nacional	26	19	3	4	53	21	+32	41
2	Montevideo Wanderers	26	13	9	4	36	16	+20	35
3	Peñarol	26	12	8	6	33	23	+10	32
4	Bella Vista	26	11	9	6	43	30	+13	31
5	Defensor	26	12	6	8	35	27	+8	30
6	Cerro	26	8	12	6	32	28	+4	28
7	Sud América	26	9	8	9	39	32	+7	26
8	Danubio	26	8	10	8	30	34	−4	26
9	Progreso	26	7	10	9	31	36	−5	24
10	Fénix	26	7	8	11	29	39	−10	22
11	Miramar	26	6	8	12	24	31	−7	20
12	River Plate	26	6	8	12	31	46	−15	20
13	Huracán Buceo	26	5	7	14	19	33	−14	17
14	Rentistas	26	3	6	17	14	53	−39	12

Source: rsssf.com
