= 1971 Campeonato Uruguayo Primera División =

68th season of the top-tier football league in Uruguay

Uruguayan Primera División
- Season: 1971
- Champions: Nacional (30th. title)

Statistics of Primera División Uruguaya for the 1971 season.

== Overview ==
It was contested by 12 teams, and Nacional won the championship.

== League standings ==
Pos	Team	Pld	W	D	L	GF	GA	GD	Pts
1	Nacional	22	12	8	2	42	17	+25	32
2	Peñarol	22	13	6	3	40	23	+17	32
3	Liverpool	22	10	9	3	31	16	+15	29
4	Bella Vista	22	10	7	5	28	19	+9	27
5	Danubio	22	10	5	7	24	25	−1	25
6	Cerro	22	6	8	8	26	36	−10	20
7	River Plate	22	4	12	6	18	22	−4	20
8	Defensor	22	6	8	8	14	18	−4	20
9	Huracán Buceo	22	6	5	11	27	30	−3	17
10	Sud América	22	3	10	9	20	27	−7	16
11	Racing Montevideo	22	3	7	12	23	44	−21	13
12	Central	22	2	9	11	21	37	−16	13

Source: rsssf.com

== Playoff ==
=== Champions ===
Pos	Team	Pld	W	D	L	GF	GA	GD	Pts
1	Nacional	5	3	2	0	10	6	+4	8
2	Peñarol	5	3	1	1	11	7	+4	7
3	Liverpool	5	2	1	2	7	5	+2	5
4	Huracán Buceo	5	1	3	1	6	9	−3	5
5	Danubio	5	0	3	2	2	4	−2	3
6	Bella Vista	5	0	2	3	7	12	−5	2

Source: rsssf.com

=== Relegation group ===
Pos	Team	Pld	W	D	L	GF	GA	GD	Pts
1	Central	5	3	2	0	10	4	+6	8
2	Cerro	5	2	2	1	11	9	+2	6
3	River Plate	5	2	2	1	9	7	+2	6
4	Sud América	5	3	0	2	7	4	+3	6
5	Defensor	5	1	1	3	5	9	−4	3
6	Racing Montevideo	5	0	1	4	4	13	−9	1

Source: rsssf.com
