= 1998 Campeonato Uruguayo Primera División =

95th season of the top-tier football league in Uruguay

Statistics of Primera División Uruguaya for the 1998 season.

== Overview ==
It was contested by 12 teams, and Nacional won the championship.

== Apertura ==
Pos	Team	Pld	W	D	L	GF	GA	GD	Pts
1	Nacional	11	9	0	2	32	14	+18	27
2	Bella Vista	11	5	5	1	10	7	+3	20
3	Peñarol	11	6	0	5	15	14	+1	18
4	Defensor Sporting	11	4	4	3	14	12	+2	16
5	River Plate	11	4	2	5	22	20	+2	14
6	Montevideo Wanderers	11	3	5	3	14	15	−1	14
7	Rampla Juniors	11	3	4	4	10	13	−3	13
8	Rentistas	11	2	6	3	10	12	−2	12
9	Villa Española	11	3	3	5	9	11	−2	12
10	Huracán Buceo	11	2	5	4	15	19	−4	11
11	Danubio	11	3	2	6	11	18	−7	11
12	Liverpool	11	2	4	5	7	14	−7	10

Source: rsssf.com

== Clausura ==
Pos	Team	Pld	W	D	L	GF	GA	GD	Pts
1	Nacional	11	7	2	2	19	8	+11	23
2	Rentistas	11	6	4	1	9	3	+6	22
3	River Plate	11	5	4	2	21	11	+10	19
4	Peñarol	11	6	1	4	25	20	+5	19
5	Danubio	11	5	4	2	12	7	+5	19
6	Bella Vista	11	3	6	2	14	10	+4	15
7	Defensor Sporting	11	2	7	2	12	14	−2	13
8	Liverpool	11	2	5	4	6	10	−4	11
9	Huracán Buceo	11	3	2	6	10	16	−6	11
10	Rampla Juniors	11	3	2	6	10	18	−8	11
11	Villa Española	11	2	4	5	13	18	−5	10
12	Montevideo Wanderers	11	0	3	8	8	24	−16	3

Source: rsssf.com

== Overall ==
Pos	Team	Pld	W	D	L	GF	GA	GD	Pts
1	Nacional	22	16	2	4	51	22	+29	50
2	Peñarol	22	12	1	9	40	34	+6	37
3	Bella Vista	22	8	11	3	24	17	+7	35
4	Rentistas	22	8	10	4	19	15	+4	34
5	River Plate	22	9	6	7	43	31	+12	33
6	Danubio	22	8	6	8	23	25	−2	30
7	Defensor Sporting	22	6	11	5	26	26	0	29
8	Rampla Juniors	22	6	6	10	20	31	−11	24
9	Villa Española	22	5	7	10	22	29	−7	22
10	Huracán Buceo	22	5	7	10	25	35	−10	22
11	Liverpool	22	4	9	9	13	24	−11	21
12	Montevideo Wanderers	22	3	8	11	22	39	−17	17

Source: rsssf.com
