= Torneo Internacional Nocturno Rioplatense =

Torneo Internacional Nocturno
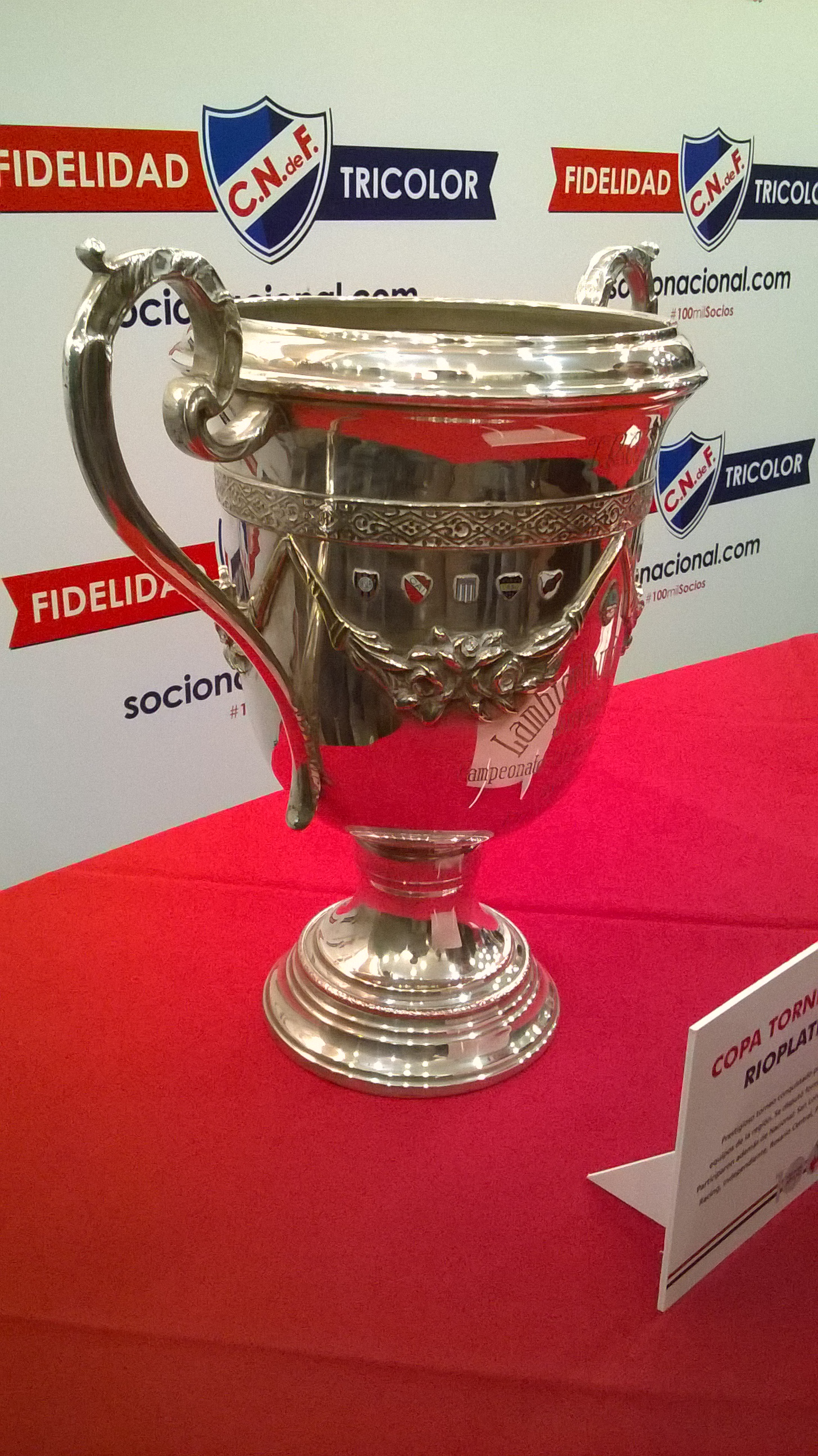
- The trophy awarded to champions
- Organiser(s): AFA; AUF
- Founded: 1936
- Abolished: 1944; 82 years ago
- Region: Argentina, Uruguay
- Teams: 10 (1944)
- Related competitions: Torneos de Verano
- Last champions: (Argentina) River Plate (1944)
- Most championships: (Argentina) Independiente; (Uruguay) Nacional; (Argentina) Newell's; (Argentina) River Plate; (one title each)

The Torneo Internacional Nocturno Rioplatense (English: Rioplatense Night International Tournament) was a friendly non-confederative (Note: The AFA never included this competition among its official tournaments, according to the Annual Reports and Balances published by the association.) association football club competition contested by teams from Argentina and Uruguay.

The Internacional Nocturno was part of several tournaments contested by Argentine and Uruguayan clubs only (such as Tie Cup, Copa de Honor Cousenier, Copa Aldao, and Copa Escobar-Gerona, among others). It was held on four occasions during the summer recess of official competitions in Argentina and Uruguay between 1936 and 1944.

Torneo Internacional Nocturno was a predecessor of Argentine Torneos de Verano, first held in 1968 and always played during January and February in Argentina, with Uruguayan (and also clubs from other countries) being invited to them.

== Format ==
Participating teams played each other in a single round-robin system. The team with most points at the end of the tournament was crowned champion. That system changed in 1944 when participants were divided into two groups of five teams each, where the first of each zone qualified to play a final that decided a champion.

== Participating teams ==
Clubs that contested the International Nocturno over the years were Independiente, Racing, San Lorenzo, Newell's Old Boys, Peñarol, Nacional (all editions), Rosario Central (1936, 1938, 1944), Boca Juniors (1936, 1938, 1943), River Plate (1936, 1938, 1944), Estudiantes (LP) (1938, 1944), and Huracán (1943, 1944)

== Notable players ==
Although being a friendly competition, participating clubs attended the Torneo Internacional Nocturno with their senior squads so some of most notable footballers of Argentina and Uruguay of those times played in the tournament.

Some of those players were Francisco Varallo, Mario Boyé, Ernesto Lazzatti (Boca Juniors); Raimundo Orsi, Arsenio Erico, Vicente de la Mata, Antonio Sastre (Independiente), Bernabé Ferreyra, Carlos Peucelle, José Manuel Moreno, Angel Labruna (River Plate), Roque Máspoli, Severino Varela (Peñarol), Atilio García, Roberto Porta (Nacional), Rinaldo Martino (San Loernzo), René Pontoni (Newell's), Waldino Aguirre (Rosario Central), Manuel Pelegrina, Ricardo Infante (Estudiantes LP), and Emilio Baldonedo (Huracán).

== Notable matches ==
The match where Nacional beat Estudiantes de La Plata 2–1 played on 19 February 1938 in La Plata remains one of the most violent matches in the history of South American football, and a clear example of the strong Rioplatense rivalry. Media that covered the match stated: "a victory from Nacional had to be avoided in any way, and we feared for the Uruguayan supporters' safety" (Uruguayan newspaper El Diario). On the other hand, Argentine magazine El Gráfico wrote: "Saturday at La Plata there were two fights, 50% to the ball, 50% to the rival players. Nobody was safe, even the referee was on the verge of being beaten".

It was revealed that there were armed persons at the stadium, and some of those people would have shown their guns near the lockers during the halftime. After being noticed of that, Nacional captain Ricardo Faccio encouraged his teammates to win the match "for us and for our families". Atilio García scored two goals (the second one with his shirt covered on his own blood after he had been injured) for the final win over Estudiantes. Because of that, the match (attended by 20,000) remained on records as "the match of the blooded shirts".

Beyond the violence, the Huracán 8–1 Peñarol (with a hat-trick by Norberto "Tucho" Méndez) on February 25, 1943, was the all-time largest win of the tournament.

== Editions ==
* Champion

=== 1936 ===
Pos.	Club	Pts	Pl	W	D	L	Gf	Gc	Dif
1º	(Argentina) Independiente	13	8	5	3	0	24	10	14
2º	(Argentina) San Lorenzo	12	8	5	2	1	22	17	5
3º	(Argentina) Rosario Central	10	8	4	2	2	20	17	3
4º	(Argentina) River Plate	9	8	3	3	2	19	19	0
5º	(Argentina) Newell's Old Boys	8	8	2	4	2	12	12	0
6º	(Uruguay) Nacional	6	8	1	4	3	7	10	-4
7º	(Uruguay) Peñarol	6	8	2	2	4	18	21	-3
8º	(Argentina) Boca Juniors	5	8	1	3	4	14	20	-6
9º	(Argentina) Racing	3	8	1	1	6	17	28	-11

=== 1938 ===
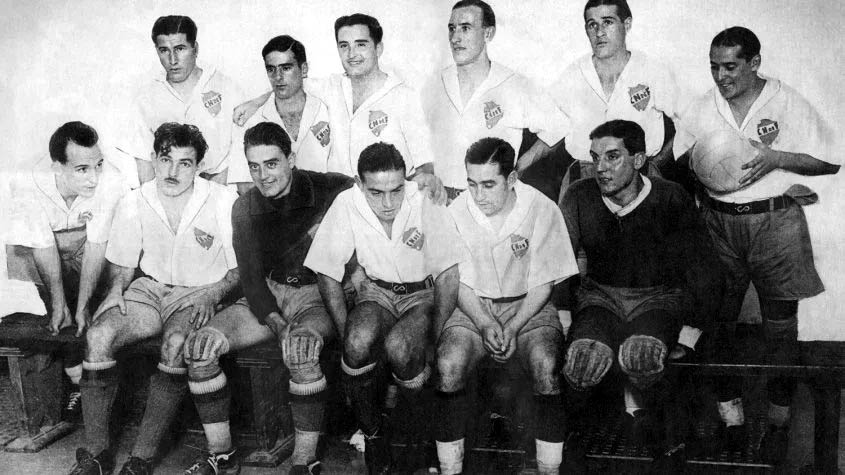
A team of Nacional (winner of the tournament) in 1938

Pos.	Club	Pts	Pl	W	D	L	Gf	Gc	Dif
1º	(Uruguay) Nacional	14	9	7	0	2	16	8	8
2º	(Argentina) San Lorenzo	12	9	6	0	3	28	21	7
3º	(Argentina) Boca Juniors	11	9	5	1	3	25	16	9
4º	(Argentina) Newell's Old Boys	10	9	4	2	3	24	19	5
5º	(Argentina) Independiente	9	9	4	1	4	22	17	5
6º	(Argentina) Racing	9	9	4	1	4	21	16	5
7º	(Argentina) Rosario Central	8	9	3	2	4	15	20	-5
8º	(Uruguay) Peñarol	7	9	3	1	5	23	31	-8
9º	(Argentina) River Plate	7	9	3	1	5	13	21	-8
10º	(Argentina) Estudiantes (LP)	3	9	1	1	7	15	33	-18

Top scorers

Player	Club	Goals
(Argentina) Atilio García	(Uruguay) Nacional	12
(Paraguay) Arsenio Erico	(Argentina) Independiente	11
(Argentina) Luis Rongo	(Argentina) River Plate	9

=== 1943 ===
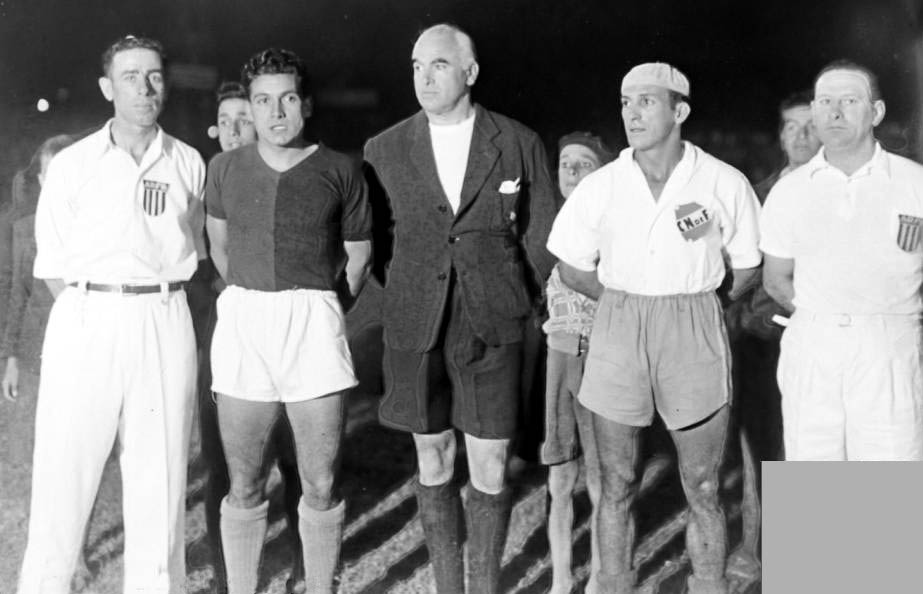
Newell's v Nacional at Parque Independencia. Fltr: Mario Morosano, Aníbal Tejada (referee), and Roberto Porta, January 1943

Pos.	Club	Pts	Pl	W	D	L	Gf	Gc	Dif
1º	(Argentina) Newell's Old Boys	11	7	5	1	1	19	13	6
2º	(Argentina) Boca Juniors	9	7	4	1	2	15	6	9
3º	(Argentina) Independiente	8	7	4	0	3	22	20	2
4º	(Uruguay) Nacional	7	7	3	1	3	17	18	-1
5º	(Argentina) Huracán	6	7	3	0	4	20	18	2
6º	(Uruguay) Peñarol	6	7	2	2	3	15	21	-6
7º	(Argentina) Racing	5	7	2	1	4	15	20	-5
8º	(Argentina) San Lorenzo	4	7	2	0	5	14	22	-8

=== 1944 ===
Group A

Pos.	Club	Pts	Pl	W	D	L	Gf	Gc	Dif	
1º	(Argentina) River Plate	5	4	2	1	1	12	7	5	First position playoff
1º	(Uruguay) Nacional	5	4	2	1	1	6	4	2	First position playoff
3º	(Argentina) Huracán	4	4	1	2	1	10	10	0	
4º	(Argentina) San Lorenzo	4	4	2	0	2	8	13	-5	
5º	(Uruguay) Peñarol	2	4	0	2	2	3	5	-2	

Group B

Pos.	Club	Pts	M	W	D	L	Gf	Gc	Dif	
1º	(Argentina) Rosario Central	5	4	2	1	1	5	4	1	Qualified to the final
2º	(Argentina) Estudiantes (LP)	4	4	2	0	2	9	9	0	
3º	(Argentina) Newell's Old Boys	4	4	1	2	1	8	8	0	
4º	(Argentina) Independiente	4	4	2	0	2	5	9	-4	
5º	(Argentina) Racing Club	3	4	1	1	2	6	7	3	

Group A first place playoff

* Winner of the series

Team 1	Team 2	Res.	Venue	City
(Argentina) River Plate	(Uruguay) Nacional	6–3	San Lorenzo Stadium	Buenos Aires

Final

Team 1	Team 2	Res.	Venue	City
(Argentina) River Plate	(Argentina) Rosario Central	2–0	San Lorenzo Stadium	Buenos Aires

=== List of champions ===
Year	Champion	Runner-up	Score
1936	(Argentina) Independiente	(Argentina) San Lorenzo	– (Note: Defined on points under a round-robin tournament format.)
1938	(Uruguay) Nacional	(Argentina) San Lorenzo	–
1943	(Argentina) Newell's Old Boys	(Argentina) Boca Juniors	–
1944	(Argentina) River Plate	(Argentina) Rosario Central	2–0

== See also ==
- Torneos de Verano (Argentina)
