= 2001 Campeonato Uruguayo Primera División =

98th season of the top-tier football league in Uruguay

The 2001 Primera División Uruguaya was contested by 18 teams, and Nacional won the championship.

== Torneo Clasificatorio ==
=== Group A ===
Pos	Team	Pld	W	D	L	GF	GA	GD	Pts
1	Nacional	6	4	1	1	13	6	+7	13
2	Danubio	6	4	1	1	14	9	+5	13
3	Bella Vista	6	3	2	1	13	7	+6	11
4	Cerro	6	2	2	2	10	7	+3	8
5	Fénix	6	2	1	3	8	9	−1	7
6	Rentistas	6	2	0	4	5	12	−7	6
7	River Plate	6	0	1	5	4	17	−13	1

Source: rsssf.com

=== Group B ===
Pos	Team	Pld	W	D	L	GF	GA	GD	Pts
1	Peñarol	5	4	1	0	8	3	+5	13
2	Defensor Sporting	5	2	1	2	10	9	+1	7
3	Central Español	5	2	1	2	10	9	+1	7
4	Racing Montevideo	5	2	1	2	5	7	−2	7
5	Montevideo Wanderers	5	1	2	2	9	11	−2	5
6	Huracán Buceo	5	0	2	3	5	8	−3	2

Source: rsssf.com

=== Group C ===
Pos	Team	Pld	W	D	L	GF	GA	GD	Pts
1	Juventud Las Piedras	4	2	1	1	5	3	+2	7
2	Paysandú Bella Vista	4	1	2	1	3	3	0	5
3	Deportivo Maldonado	4	1	2	1	2	2	0	5
4	Tacuarembó	4	1	2	1	4	5	−1	5
5	Rocha	4	1	1	2	5	6	−1	4

Source: rsssf.com

=== Overall ===
Pos	Team	Pld	W	D	L	GF	GA	GD	Pts
1	Peñarol	17	12	3	2	30	16	+14	39
2	Danubio	17	11	5	1	42	24	+18	38
3	Defensor Sporting	17	11	3	3	42	22	+20	36
4	Nacional	17	8	7	2	37	20	+17	31
5	Bella Vista	17	9	4	4	36	24	+12	31
6	Fénix	17	9	2	6	31	21	+10	29
7	Montevideo Wanderers	17	7	6	4	27	20	+7	27
8	Tacuarembó	17	5	7	5	22	22	0	22
9	Central Español	17	5	5	7	27	26	+1	20
10	Racing Montevideo	17	5	5	7	18	24	−6	20
11	Cerro	17	5	4	8	23	20	+3	19
12	Juventud Las Piedras	17	5	3	9	16	24	−8	18
13	Rentistas	17	5	3	9	14	29	−15	18
14	Paysandú Bella Vista	17	3	7	7	15	26	−11	16
15	Huracán Buceo	17	3	6	8	25	31	−6	15
16	River Plate	17	3	6	8	11	25	−14	15
17	Deportivo Maldonado	17	3	5	9	13	32	−19	14
18	Rocha	17	2	3	12	17	40	−23	9

Source: rsssf.com

== Champions ==
=== Apertura ===
Pos	Team	Pld	W	D	L	GF	GA	GD	Pts
1	Danubio	9	7	1	1	17	4	+13	22
2	Peñarol	9	6	3	0	18	7	+11	21
3	Nacional	9	6	0	3	15	9	+6	18
4	Montevideo Wanderers	9	5	2	2	14	11	+3	17
5	Defensor Sporting	9	3	4	2	20	15	+5	13
6	Fénix	9	4	1	4	16	13	+3	13
7	Tacuarembó	9	2	2	5	9	14	−5	8
8	Bella Vista	9	2	0	7	12	20	−8	6
9	Paysandú Bella Vista	9	1	2	6	5	19	−14	5
10	Juventud Las Piedras	9	1	1	7	10	24	−14	4

Source: rsssf.com

=== Clausura ===
Pos	Team	Pld	W	D	L	GF	GA	GD	Pts
1	Nacional	9	6	3	0	19	7	+12	21
2	Danubio	9	6	0	3	19	13	+6	18
3	Peñarol	9	5	1	3	11	10	+1	16
4	Defensor Sporting	9	4	1	4	15	18	−3	13
5	Montevideo Wanderers	9	3	3	3	12	10	+2	12
6	Juventud Las Piedras	9	3	4	2	12	11	+1	10 (Note: 3 points deducted?)
7	Tacuarembó	9	3	1	5	9	9	0	10
8	Fénix	9	2	4	3	10	12	−2	10
9	Paysandú Bella Vista	9	2	3	4	13	18	−5	9
10	Bella Vista	9	1	0	8	8	20	−12	3

Source: rsssf.com

=== Playoff ===
- Nacional 2-2; 2-1 Danubio

Nacional won the championship.

== Relegation group ==
=== Group A ===
Pos	Team	Pld	W	D	L	GF	GA	GD	Pts
1	Central Español	31	13	9	9	49	35	+14	48
2	Cerro	31	12	8	11	48	36	+12	44
3	River Plate	31	8	13	10	25	37	−12	37
4	Racing Montevideo	31	7	12	12	32	45	−13	33
5	Rentistas	31	8	7	16	29	51	−22	31
6	Huracán Buceo	31	5	11	15	37	53	−16	26

Source: rsssf.com

=== Group B ===
Pos	Team	Pld	W	D	L	GF	GA	GD	Pts
1	Deportivo Maldonado	31	8	9	14	31	49	−18	33
2	Rocha	31	6	8	17	35	59	−24	26

Source: rsssf.com
