= Liga Mayor (Uruguay) =

- Organising body: AUF
- Founded: 1975
- Abolished: 1978; 47 years ago
- Region: Uruguay
- Most successful team(s): Nacional (3 titles)

The Liga Mayor was a Uruguayan football tournament organized by the Uruguayan Football Association from 1975 to 1978.

In its first three editions only the Primera División teams participated, while for the 1978 edition the four semifinalists of the Campeonato de Clubes Campeones del Interior were invited to participate.

In this last edition there was a three-way tie for first place between Peñarol, Defensor and Huracán Buceo, which led to a controversy. Defensor had a greater goal difference, while Peñarol had more goals in favor. Defensor proposed to play a tiebreaker match, but the AUF rejected his request and declared Peñarol as champion.

== List of champions ==
| Ed. | Year | Champion | Runner-up |
|---|---|---|---|
| 1 | 1975 | Nacional | Liverpool |
| 2 | 1976 | Nacional | Peñarol |
| 3 | 1977 | Nacional | Peñarol |
| 3 | 1978 | Peñarol | Defensor |

== Titles by club ==
| Club | Titles | Years won |
|---|---|---|
| Nacional | 3 | 1975, 1976, 1977 |
| Peñarol | 1 | 1978 |
