= 2000 Campeonato Uruguayo Primera División =

97th season of the top-tier football league in Uruguay

Statistics of Primera División Uruguaya for the 2000 season.

== Overview ==
It was contested by 18 teams, and Nacional won the championship.

== Apertura ==
Pos	Team	Pld	W	D	L	GF	GA	GD	Pts
1	Nacional	17	14	2	1	42	14	+28	44
2	Danubio	17	11	3	3	45	22	+23	36
3	Defensor Sporting	17	11	3	3	40	22	+18	36
4	Peñarol	17	11	3	3	39	26	+13	36
5	Cerro	17	8	4	5	39	30	+9	28
6	Rentistas	17	8	4	5	31	24	+7	28
7	Bella Vista	17	6	5	6	29	27	+2	23
8	Tacuarembó	17	5	8	4	21	23	−2	23
9	Deportivo Maldonado	17	7	1	9	25	32	−7	22
10	River Plate	17	4	6	7	30	32	−2	18
11	Racing Montevideo	17	5	3	9	25	33	−8	18
12	Juventud Las Piedras	17	4	6	7	17	25	−8	18
13	Rocha	17	4	6	7	30	41	−11	18
14	Liverpool	17	5	3	9	19	30	−11	18
15	Paysandú Bella Vista	17	5	2	10	22	30	−8	17
16	Frontera Rivera	17	4	3	10	25	39	−14	15
17	Villa Española	17	3	5	9	24	40	−16	14
18	Huracán Buceo	17	3	3	11	20	33	−13	12

Source: rsssf.com

== Clausura ==
Pos	Team	Pld	W	D	L	GF	GA	GD	Pts
1	Peñarol	16	13	3	0	35	11	+24	42
2	Defensor Sporting	16	12	4	0	44	13	+31	40
3	Nacional	16	11	4	1	28	11	+17	37
4	Danubio	16	7	7	2	36	15	+21	28
5	Tacuarembó	16	7	4	5	23	17	+6	25
6	River Plate	16	6	4	6	25	30	−5	22
7	Cerro	16	5	5	6	23	24	−1	20
8	Racing Montevideo	16	5	5	6	21	24	−3	20
9	Bella Vista	16	5	4	7	27	34	−7	19
10	Rentistas	16	4	5	7	15	23	−8	17
11	Juventud Las Piedras	16	4	4	8	18	23	−5	16
12	Paysandú Bella Vista	16	3	6	7	18	24	−6	15
13	Huracán Buceo	16	3	5	8	17	26	−9	14
14	Deportivo Maldonado	16	3	5	8	17	27	−10	14
15	Frontera Rivera	16	4	2	10	21	37	−16	14
16	Rocha	16	4	2	10	20	36	−16	14
17	Liverpool	16	2	7	7	12	25	−13	13
18	Villa Española (W)	0	–	–	–	–	–	—	0

Source: rsssf.com
(W) Withdrew

== Overall ==
Pos	Team	Pld	W	D	L	GF	GA	GD	Pts
1	Nacional	33	25	6	2	70	25	+45	81
2	Peñarol	33	24	6	3	74	37	+37	78
3	Defensor Sporting	33	23	7	3	84	35	+49	76
4	Danubio	33	18	10	5	81	37	+44	64
5	Cerro	33	13	9	11	62	54	+8	48
6	Tacuarembó	33	12	12	9	44	40	+4	48
7	Rentistas	33	12	9	12	46	47	−1	45
8	Bella Vista	33	11	9	13	56	61	−5	42
9	River Plate	33	10	10	13	55	61	−6	40
10	Racing Montevideo	33	10	8	15	46	57	−11	38
11	Deportivo Maldonado	33	10	6	17	42	60	−18	36
12	Juventud Las Piedras	33	8	10	15	35	48	−13	34
13	Paysandú Bella Vista	33	8	8	17	40	54	−14	32
14	Rocha	33	8	8	17	50	77	−27	32
15	Liverpool	33	7	10	16	31	55	−24	31
16	Frontera Rivera	33	8	5	20	46	76	−30	29
17	Huracán Buceo	33	6	8	19	37	59	−22	26
18	Villa Española	17	3	5	9	24	40	−16	14

Source: rsssf.com

== Playoff ==
- Nacional 1-0 ; 1-1 Peñarol

Nacional won the championship.
