= Torneo Campeones Olímpicos =

- Organising body: AUF
- Founded: 1974
- Abolished: 1974; 51 years ago
- Region: Uruguay
- Most successful team(s): Nacional (1 title)

The Torneo Campeones Olímpicos was a Uruguayan football tournament organized by the Uruguayan Football Association in 1974.

It was a qualifying tournament for the Liguilla Pre-Libertadores and granted four slots for it.

== List of champions ==
Ed.	Year	Champion	Runner-up
1	1974	Nacional	Peñarol

== Titles by club ==
Club	Titles	Years won
Nacional	1	1974

== 1974 Torneo Campeones Olímpicos ==
=== Standings ===
Pos	Team	Pld	W	D	L	GF	GA	GD	Pts	Qualification or relegation
1	Nacional	11	7	3	1	12	5	+7	17	Qualified to the 1974 Liguilla Pre-Libertadores
2	Peñarol	11	6	4	1	15	3	+12	16	Qualified to the 1974 Liguilla Pre-Libertadores
3	Danubio	11	7	2	2	23	10	+13	16	Qualified to the 1974 Liguilla Pre-Libertadores
4	Montevideo Wanderers	11	6	3	2	17	11	+6	15	Qualified to the 1974 Liguilla Pre-Libertadores
5	Cerro	11	7	1	3	20	11	+9	15	
6	Liverpool	11	5	3	3	15	10	+5	13	
7	Huracán Buceo	11	3	5	3	9	8	+1	11	
8	Fénix	11	3	2	6	8	18	−10	8	
9	Bella Vista	11	1	4	6	12	21	−9	6	
10	Defensor Sporting	11	1	4	6	7	16	−9	6	
11	Rentistas	11	2	1	8	10	22	−12	5	
12	River Plate	11	0	4	7	4	17	−13	4	

Source: https://atilio.uy/copa:155
