= Copa Albion de Caridad =

Copa Albion
- Organising body: AUF
- Founded: 1916
- Abolished: 1921; 104 years ago
- Region: Uruguay
- Most successful team(s): Peñarol (3 titles)

The Copa Albion de Caridad was a Uruguayan football cup competition organized by the Uruguayan Football Association from 1916 to 1921.

All the clubs of the Uruguayan Primera División participated and it had a knockout format.

== List of champions ==
Ed.	Year	Champion	Runner-up
1	1916	Peñarol	Nacional
2	1917	Peñarol	Montevideo Wanderers
3	1919	Nacional	Central
4	1921	Peñarol	Universal

== Titles by club ==
Club	Titles	Years won
Peñarol	3	1916, 1917, 1921
Nacional	1	1919
