= Santiago Silva (footballer, born 2004) =

Uruguayan footballer (born 2004)

Personal information
- Full name: Santiago Fabián Silva Silva
- Date of birth: 20 August 2004 (age 22)
- Place of birth: Montevideo, Uruguay
- Height: 1.81 m (5 ft 11 in)
- Position: Midfielder

Team information
- Current team: Nacional (on loan from Huachipato)

Youth career
- Danubio

Senior career*
Years	Team	Apps	(Gls)
2021–2023	Danubio	55	(1)
2024–	Huachipato	63	(3)
2026–	→ Nacional (loan)	0	(0)

International career
2022	Uruguay U20	4	(0)
- * Club domestic league appearances and goals as of 25 May 2024

Santiago Fabián Silva Silva (born 20 August 2004) is a Uruguayan professional footballer who plays as a midfielder for Nacional on loan from Chilean club Huachipato.

== Club career ==
A product of Danubio, Silva made his professional debut in the 2021 season of the Uruguayan Segunda División, aged 17, making three appearances. He scored his first goal at professional level in the Uruguayan Primera División match against River Plate on 24 September 2022. In 2023, he was included by the CIES Football Observatory in the world ranking of the 200 most promising under-20 central midfielders.

In 2024, Silva moved to Chile and signed with Chilean Primera División champions Huachipato on a deal for four years. On 20 July 2026, he joined Nacional on a loan until December 2027.

== International career ==
Silva represented Uruguay at under-20 level during 2022 in friendly matches against Peru and Chile, but he was not included in the final squad for the 2023 South American Championship.

== Honours ==
Huachipato

- Copa Chile: 2025
