= Héctor Salvá =

Uruguayan footballer (1939-2015)

Personal information
- Full name: Héctor Salvá González
- Date of birth: 27 November 1939
- Place of birth: Montevideo, Uruguay
- Date of death: 20 November 2015 (aged 75)
- Position: Midfielder

Senior career*
Years	Team	Apps	(Gls)
1959–1961	Nacional		
1962–1965	Rampla Juniors		
1966–1968	Danubio		
1968–1969	Gimnasia de La Plata	31	(2)

International career
1960–1967	Uruguay	18	(2)

Managerial career
- –: Nacional
- * Club domestic league appearances and goals

Héctor Salvá González (27 November 1939 – 20 November 2015) was a Uruguayan football midfielder who played for Uruguay in the 1966 FIFA World Cup. He also played for Danubio. In Argentina, he played for Gimnasia de La Plata in 1968-'69, and coached it in 1975.

After he retired from playing, Salva became a football coach. He managed Club Nacional de Football, where he received credit for developing Uruguay international Fabián O'Neill.
