= 2002 Campeonato Uruguayo Primera División =

Football competition in Uruguay

Statistics of Primera División Uruguaya for the 2002 season.

== Overview ==
It was contested by 18 teams, and Nacional won the championship.

== Torneo Clasificatorio ==
=== Group A ===
Pos	Team	Pld	W	D	L	GF	GA	GD	Pts
1	Nacional	17	10	2	5	40	24	+16	32
2	Fénix	17	9	5	3	40	26	+14	32
3	Danubio	17	10	2	5	37	24	+13	32
4	Villa Española	17	6	4	7	27	29	−2	22
5	River Plate	17	6	3	8	29	34	−5	21
6	Bella Vista	17	4	4	9	23	30	−7	16
7	Progreso	17	0	5	12	17	41	−24	5

Source: rsssf.com

=== Group B ===
Pos	Team	Pld	W	D	L	GF	GA	GD	Pts
1	Peñarol	17	10	6	1	41	22	+19	36
2	Defensor Sporting	17	9	4	4	32	16	+16	31
3	Central Español	17	9	4	4	28	30	−2	31
4	Montevideo Wanderers	17	7	4	6	24	26	−2	25
5	Cerro	17	4	6	7	20	27	−7	18
6	Racing Montevideo	17	4	4	9	19	33	−14	16

Source: rsssf.com

=== Group C ===
Pos	Team	Pld	W	D	L	GF	GA	GD	Pts
1	Plaza Colonia	17	10	2	5	25	16	+9	32
2	Deportivo Maldonado	17	7	3	7	31	22	+9	24
3	Tacuarembó	17	5	6	6	18	20	−2	21
4	Paysandú Bella Vista	17	6	1	10	17	29	−12	19
5	Juventud Las Piedras	17	3	3	11	19	38	−19	12

Source: rsssf.com

=== Overall ===
Pos	Team	Pld	W	D	L	GF	GA	GD	Pts
1	Peñarol	17	10	6	1	41	22	+19	36
2	Nacional	17	10	2	5	40	24	+16	32
3	Fénix	17	9	5	3	40	26	+14	32
4	Danubio	17	10	2	5	37	24	+13	32
5	Plaza Colonia	17	10	2	5	25	16	+9	32
6	Defensor Sporting	17	9	4	4	32	16	+16	31
7	Central Español	17	9	4	4	28	30	−2	31
8	Montevideo Wanderers	17	7	4	6	24	26	−2	25
9	Deportivo Maldonado	17	7	3	7	31	22	+9	24
10	Villa Española	17	6	4	7	27	29	−2	22
11	Tacuarembó	17	5	6	6	18	20	−2	21
12	River Plate	17	6	3	8	29	34	−5	21
13	Paysandú Bella Vista	17	6	1	10	17	29	−12	19
14	Cerro	17	4	6	7	20	27	−7	18
15	Bella Vista	17	4	4	9	23	30	−7	16
16	Racing Montevideo	17	4	4	9	19	33	−14	16
17	Juventud Las Piedras	17	3	3	11	19	38	−19	12
18	Progreso	17	0	5	12	17	41	−24	5

Source: rsssf.com

== Champions ==
=== Apertura ===
Pos	Team	Pld	W	D	L	GF	GA	GD	Pts
1	Nacional	9	8	1	0	20	6	+14	25
2	Peñarol	9	7	0	2	25	12	+13	21
3	Fénix	9	6	0	3	22	11	+11	18
4	Deportivo Maldonado	9	4	2	3	10	17	−7	14
5	Montevideo Wanderers	9	3	3	3	8	9	−1	12
6	Defensor Sporting	9	4	0	5	15	17	−2	12
7	Danubio	9	3	2	4	12	14	−2	11
8	Plaza Colonia	9	2	2	5	10	13	−3	8
9	Central Español	9	2	1	6	13	21	−8	7
10	Villa Española	9	0	1	8	8	23	−15	1

Source: rsssf.com

=== Clausura ===
Pos	Team	Pld	W	D	L	GF	GA	GD	Pts
1	Danubio	9	6	2	1	16	8	+8	20
2	Peñarol	9	7	1	1	25	16	+9	19 (Note: 3 points deducted?)
3	Fénix	9	4	3	2	24	18	+6	15
4	Defensor Sporting	9	4	3	2	16	12	+4	15
5	Nacional	9	4	2	3	20	16	+4	14
6	Plaza Colonia	9	4	2	3	16	12	+4	14
7	Villa Española	9	1	4	4	10	21	−11	7
8	Montevideo Wanderers	9	1	3	5	8	12	−4	6
9	Deportivo Maldonado	9	2	0	7	8	21	−13	6
10	Central Español	9	1	2	6	9	16	−7	5

Source: rsssf.com

=== Playoff ===
- Danubio 1-2 ; 1-2 Nacional

Nacional won the championship.

== Relegation group ==
=== Group A ===
Pos	Team	Pld	W	D	L	GF	GA	GD	Pts
1	River Plate	31	12	6	13	47	50	−3	42
2	Cerro	31	10	11	10	43	40	+3	41
3	Bella Vista	31	10	8	13	41	46	−5	38
4	Racing Montevideo	31	7	11	13	38	50	−12	32
5	Progreso	31	7	8	16	34	58	−24	29

Source: rsssf.com

=== Group B ===
Pos	Team	Pld	W	D	L	GF	GA	GD	Pts
1	Tacuarembó	31	11	9	11	33	36	−3	42
2	Juventud Las Piedras	31	7	8	16	37	58	−21	29
3	Paysandú Bella Vista	31	8	3	20	28	53	−25	27

Source: rsssf.com
