= Torneo Cuadrangular (Uruguay) =

- Organising body: AUF
- Founded: 1952
- Abolished: 1968; 57 years ago
- Region: Uruguay
- Most successful team(s): Nacional (7 titles)

The Torneo Cuadrangular was a Uruguayan football tournament organized by the Uruguayan Football Association from 1952 to 1968.

The best four teams of each Uruguayan Primera División qualified to play the Torneo Cuadrangular, according to their placements in the final positions of each tournament.

== List of champions ==
Ed.	Year	Champion	Runner-up	Third place	Fourth place
1	1952	Nacional	Peñarol	Rampla Juniors	Danubio
2	1953	Rampla Juniors	River Plate	Nacional	Peñarol
3	1954	Nacional	Danubio	Rampla Juniors	Peñarol
4	1955	The first place was shared by Danubio, Nacional and Peñarol.			Cerro
5	1956	Nacional	Defensor	Peñarol	Cerro
6	1957	Defensor	Fénix	Nacional	Peñarol
7	1958	Nacional	Peñarol	Sud América	Rampla Juniors
8	1959	Peñarol	Nacional	Cerro	Racing
9	1960	Peñarol	Nacional	Cerro	Fénix
10	1961	Nacional	Peñarol	Defensor	Danubio
11	1962	The first place was shared by Nacional and Peñarol.		Defensor	Fénix
12	1963	Peñarol	Nacional	Montevideo Wanderers	Fénix
13	1964	Nacional	Peñarol	Rampla Juniors	Montevideo Wanderers
–	1965	(Not held)			
14	1966	Peñarol	Nacional	Danubio	Cerro
15	1967	Nacional	Peñarol	Racing	Cerro
16	1968	Peñarol	Nacional	Defensor	Cerro

== Titles by club ==
Club	Titles	Years won
Nacional	7	1952, 1954, 1956, 1958, 1961, 1964, 1967
Peñarol	5	1959, 1960, 1963, 1966, 1968
Defensor	1	1957
Rampla Juniors	1	1953
