= Campeonato Nacional General Artigas =

Football tournament in Uruguay

- Organising body: AUF
- Founded: 1960
- Abolished: 1962; 63 years ago
- Region: Uruguay
- Most successful team(s): Nacional (2 titles)

The Campeonato Nacional General Artigas was a Uruguayan football tournament organized by the Uruguayan Football Association from 1960 to 1962.

It was the first attempt to hold a championship that would integrate teams from the capital and the interior of the country.

== List of champions ==
Ed.	Year	Champion	Runner-up
1	1960	Defensor	Nacional
2	1961	Nacional	Danubio
3	1962	Nacional	Defensor

== Titles by club ==
Club	Titles	Years won
Nacional	2	1961, 1962
Defensor	1	1960
