= Copa León Peyrou =

- Organising body: AUF
- Founded: 1919
- Abolished: 1922; 103 years ago
- Region: Uruguay
- Most successful team(s): Nacional (3 titles)

The Copa León Peyrou was a Uruguayan football cup competition organized by the Uruguayan Football Association from 1919 to 1922, named after the leader of the old River Plate FC and President of the AUF since 1920.

The tournament was held during the last months of the year. All the clubs of the Uruguayan Primera División participated and it had a knockout format.

After the first edition won by Universal, Nacional won the next three competitions, obtaining the cup as its own.

== List of champions ==
Ed.	Year	Champion	Runner-up
1	1919	Universal	Dublín
2	1920	Nacional	Universal
3	1921	Nacional	Uruguay Onward
4	1922	Nacional	Peñarol

== Titles by club ==
Club	Titles	Years won
Nacional	3	1920, 1921, 1922
Universal	1	1919
