= Club Nacional de Football =

Uruguayan association football club

Nacional
- Full name: Club Nacional de Football
- Nicknames: Decano (The Dean); Albos (The Whites); Bolso (The Pocket); Bolsilludos (The Pockets); Rey de Copas (King of Trophies); Tricolor
- Short name: NAC
- Founded: 14 May 1899; 127 years ago
- Ground: Gran Parque Central
- Capacity: 38,000
- Coordinates: 34°53′4.2″S 56°9′32.4″W
- Chairman: Ricardo Vairo
- Manager: Jorge Bava
- League: Liga AUF Uruguaya
- 2025: Liga AUF Uruguaya, 1st of 16 (champions)
- Website: nacional.uy
Home colours	Away colours	Third colours

Club Nacional de Football (Spanish pronunciation: [ˈkluβ nasjoˈnal de ˈfuðβol], National Football Club; simply referred to as Nacional) is a professional sports club based in La Blanqueada, Montevideo, Uruguay including basketball, futsal, tennis, cycling, volleyball, and chess, but are primarily known for their focus on association football. The football branch currently competes in the Uruguayan Primera División, the highest tier in the Uruguayan football league system.

Founded in 1899 following the merger of Uruguay Athletic Club and Montevideo Football Club, Nacional was established by a group of students of the University of Montevideo who sought to create a football club for Uruguayan-born players in response to the dominance of foreign clubs and players (mostly from the British and German communities) in the country, thus making it one of the first clubs in the continent founded by locals. In February 2013, Nacional reached 60,000 associates. Nacional have historically been associated with the white, blue, and red colors inspired by the flag of José Gervasio Artigas to represent its patriotic identity. Although the club occasionally plays at the Estadio Centenario, it hosts most of its home matches at the Gran Parque Central, one of the three venues selected for the inaugural FIFA World Cup in 1930 and hosting one of the tournament's two opening matches. The stadium also hosted the World Cup debuts of several national football teams. (Note: The Argentine, Belgian, Brazilian, Chilean, Paraguayan, United States, and Yugoslavian national football teams have all made their World Cup debuts at the Gran Parque Central, playing their first group stage matches at the stadium.) Gran Parque Central was also the only venue featured in the 1923 and 1924 editions of the Copa América.

Nacional is among the most decorated football clubs in the sport, having won 103 domestic tournaments, including the Uruguayan Primera División on 50 occasions. (Note: These domestic tournaments also include a record of four Copa de Honor Cousenier, three Copa Aldao, two Tie Cups, and one Copa Escobar-Gerona, all of them organized jointly by the Argentine and Uruguayan Associations.) At intercontinental/international level, Nacional has won 9 titles recognized by FIFA/CONMEBOL, including three Copa Libertadores (1971, 1980, 1988) and three Intercontinental Cups (1971, 1980, 1988), remaining undefeated in the latter. In addition, Nacional is the 2nd best all-time performing club of the Copa Libertadores (618 points). Nacional is also the only Uruguayan team to have won the Copa Interamericana (1972, 1989) and the Recopa Sudamericana in 1989, the inaugural edition. The club has never been relegated and many long-standing rivalries, most notably with Peñarol, known as the Uruguayan Clásico. CONMEBOL ranked Nacional as Uruguay's top international performer from 2007–2012; the IFFHS named it Uruguay's best team of 2001–2010 and the seventh best of South America.

== History ==
=== Foundation and first years ===
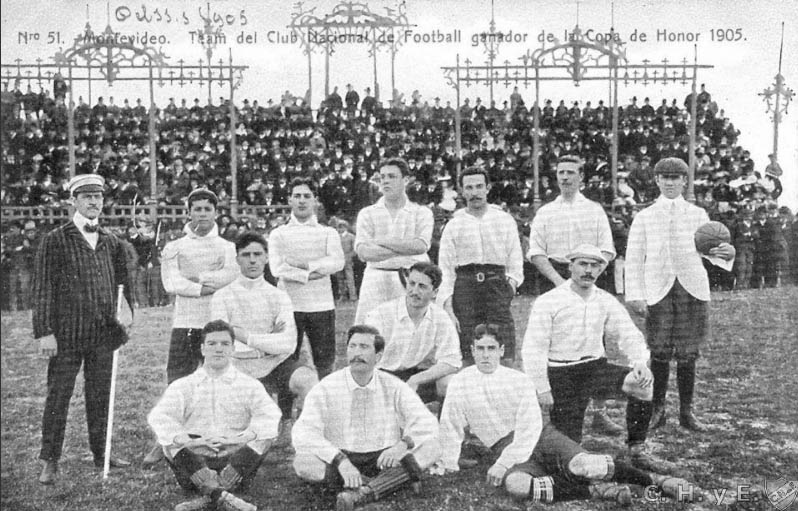
Nacional in 1905. That squad won the Copa de Honor Cousenier defeating legendary Argentine team Alumni

Nacional is a result of the fusion between Montevideo Football Club and Uruguay Athletic Club, 14 May 1899. It was decided there that the club's flag should include the three colours (red, blue and white) historically connected to José Gervasio Artigas, Uruguay's national hero. The club's uniform was mostly red and blue. In 1900 Nacional included the Club Defensa and its players, and started playing at the Estadio Gran Parque Central. That same year four clubs governed by foreigners (Albion F.C., CURCC, Uruguay Athletic Club and Deutscher F.K.) founded the "Uruguay Association League". Nacional's petition to be included was dismissed on the thought that criollo clubs and their players lacked category. However, the League's clubs had to admit Nacional in 1901, after the club was invited to join the Argentinean League, due to their impressive performances in a number of friendly matches. In 1902 Nacional won their first Uruguayan Primera División title. The red jersey was substituted by the white jersey in 1902.

In September 1903 Nacional fully represented the Uruguay national football team and beat Argentina 3–2, winning the first international match ever (between national teams) in the history of Uruguayan football (the first international club match ever, was won by Albion over Argentine team Retiro A.C. 3–1 in 1896 in Buenos Aires). In 1905 Nacional won its first international title, the Copa de Honor Cousenier.

In a general assembly which took place in 1911, the populist majority led by club president José María Delgado obtained a victory over the elitist minority which resulted in an institutional transformation: the club opened its doors to players from lower classes, such as Abdón Porte, who would eventually become one of the club's biggest symbols, playing in Nacional until his premature death in 1918.

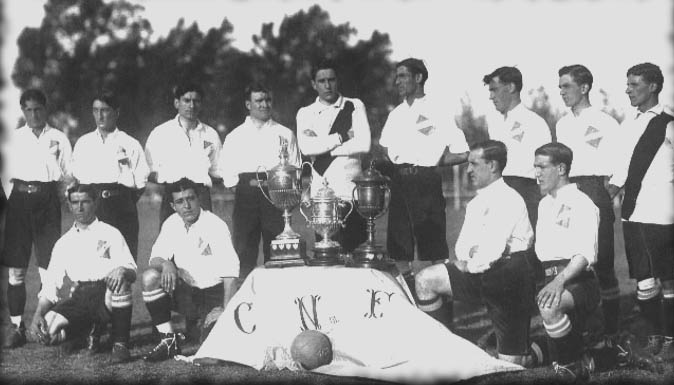
Nacional in 1915, posing with the three trophies won that year: Tie Cup, Primera División and Copa de Honor Cousenier

Nacional's players started developing already around 1900 a new playing style that introduced a less physical and more imaginative game, made out of fast combinations and frequent dribbles. Magariños says: "The action of these teams [the British-Uruguayan team] was conducted according to the purest and standardized virtues of British sport: positional play, long passes, furious shots, and strong physical play. The body was used as a weapon, both offensively and defensively. (...) Nacional, formed mainly by smaller and faster players (...) abandoned the physical confrontation that was allowed back then, and chose to play according to their own possibilities. They chose to perform dribbling's, fast and short passing, very fast sprints, and a hectic activity in the pitch."[]

After winning the 1912 championship, they won the 1915 Triple Crown (tri-championship), which included the three major domestic and international tournaments of that time: Primera División, Tie Cup, and Copa de Honor Cousenier. Nacional would go on to win the first Copa Uruguaya en propiedad (meaning they were the first club to win three championships in a row), by winning both the 1916 and 1917 league championships, also winning the 1919, 1920, 1922, 1923 and 1924 league titles.

At international level, Nacional won three Copa Aldao (1916, 1919, 1920), three consecutive Copa de Honor Cousenier (1915, 1916, 1917), and two Tie Cup (1913, 1915).

=== International tours and success ===
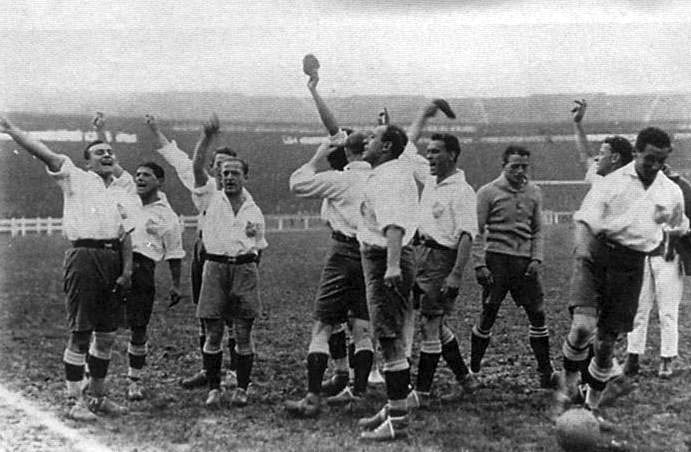
Nacional saluting the crowd in Paris, during their 1925 European tour

After two very successful initial decades in the national league of Uruguay and at the regional level, Nacional became the foundation of Uruguay's first international success at the world level. In 1924, Nacional contributed players (Mazzali, Urdinarán, Scarone, Romano, Zibechi and Pascual Somma) for Uruguayan national representative that won the Summer Olympics in Paris. Nacional made also a substantial contribution to the Uruguayan teams of 1928 and 1930, Olympic and World champions respectively. Nacional is the only Uruguayan club that contributed players to every Uruguay national team that has won international tournaments.

In 1925, due to the success of Uruguay and players from Nacional in the 1924 Summer Olympics, Nacional was invited to make an extensive European tour, playing 38 matches over six months. During that tour, Nacional played against both national squads and professional club teams from 9 European countries. Nacional won 26 matches, tied 7, and lost 5, scoring 130 goals and allowing 30. An estimate of 800,000 tickets were sold during that tour, where Nacional played friendlies in France, Italy, Spain, the Netherlands, Switzerland, Austria, and Portugal. which is considered the largest tour in the history of world football.

In 1927, Nacional made a North America tour, with similar results to the ones obtained in the European adventure made two years before, with 16 wins, 2 ties and 1 loss.

=== The show team: 1932–43 ===
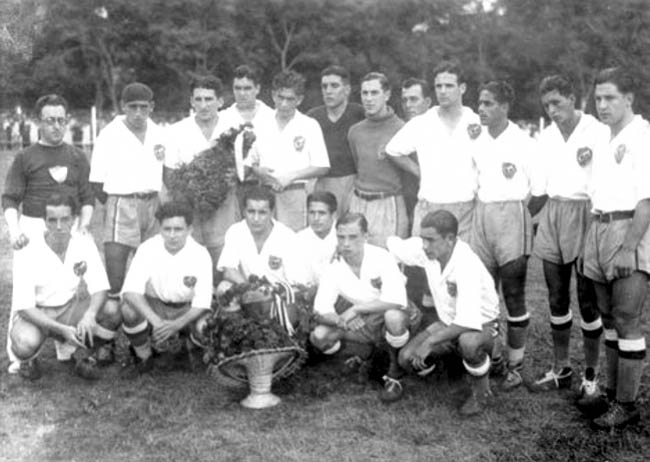
Nacional in 1934, when winning the Torneo Competencia

In 1932, football became professional in Uruguay and Nacional formed a team that would be nicknamed La Máquina Blanca (The White Machine). The team scored 28 goals in the first four games of the 1932 season. In 1933 Nacional won its 12th. first division title, repeating the next year. The 1933 championship is remembered as the longest ever, since it ended in November 1934, after a series of final games against Peñarol, the last won by Nacional by 3–2 with 3 goals by Héctor Castro.

In 1938, Argentine footballer Atilio García came to the club. That same year Nacional won the Torneo Internacional Nocturno Rioplatense, an international friendly championship. Between 1939 and 1943, coached by former player Héctor Castro, Nacional won the Quinquenio de Oro (five consecutive championships from 1939 to 1943). Some highlights of those times was the 5–1 victory over Peñarol, with 4 goals by Atilio García. Nacional also made an outstanding campaign in the 1941 season, winning all the games disputed (20/20). In those five years the team played 96 Copa Uruguaya games, won 77, tied 9 and only lost 10, made 318 goals and allowed 108.

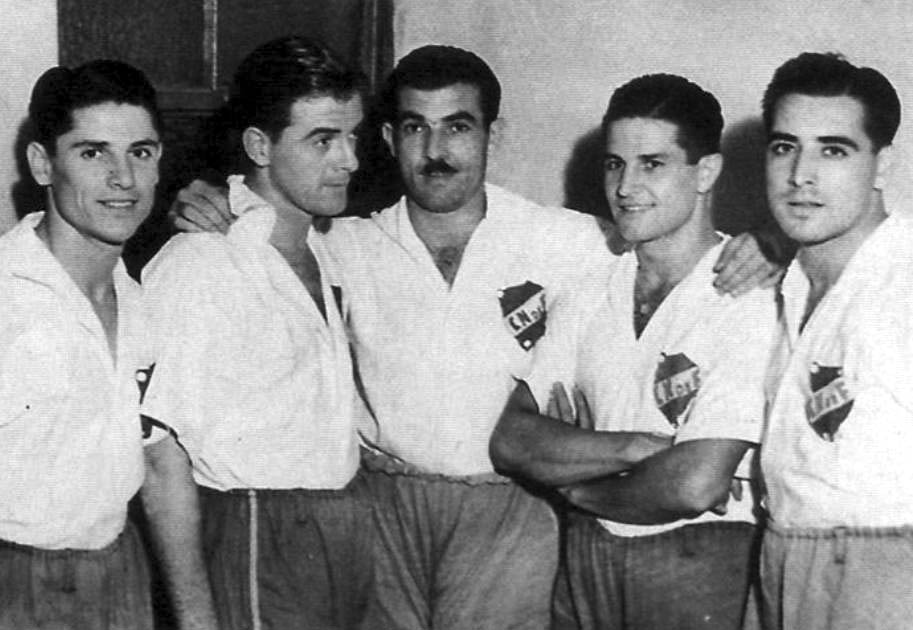
One forward line of the Quinquenio (1939–43)

Nacional's superiority over Peñarol during this era is best exemplified by some particular feats:

- Between 1938 and 1943 there were 23 clásicos, with 18 victories for Nacional and only 4 for their rivals.
- On 14 December 1941 Nacional obtained the largest win in the history of Uruguayan Clásico, defeating Peñarol 6 – 0. (That year, Nacional won all 20 games of the championship.)
- On 23 November 1943 Nacional won their tenth Campeonato uruguayo clásico in a row.

Notable players of that period include Atilio García (all-time Nacional's top scorer, also Uruguayan Clásico all-time top scorer with 34 goals, eight times Uruguayan Champion, eight times league's highest scorer); Aníbal Paz (nine times Uruguayan champion and World Champion defending Uruguay in 1950); Schubert Gambetta (nine times Uruguayan Champion and World Champion in 1950); Luis Ernesto Castro (seven times Uruguayan Champion); Aníbal Ciocca (eight times Uruguayan Champion), Eugenio Pato Galvalisi (seven times Uruguayan Champion), Roberto Porta (six times Uruguayan Champion), Bibiano Zapirain (six times Uruguayan Champion).

=== International achievements ===
Nacional's international reputation relied on the tournaments played during the first half of the 20th century in the Río de la Plata region, where the most important international tournaments in America were played before the Copa Libertadores was created. Historical rivalries with longtime enemy Peñarol and famous Argentinian teams like Boca, River Plate, Racing, Independiente, San Lorenzo, Rosario Central and Newell's Old Boys, among others, were established in those championships.

Nacional participated in the Libertadores for the first time in 1962, when they were defeated in the semi-finals by Peñarol. They got to the Finals in 1964, but lost to Independiente, and in 1967 to Racing.

With President Miguel Restuccia, Nacional formed the basis of a team that would eventually achieve its goal, with players such as Ubiña, Mujica, Montero Castillo, Espárrago, Cascarilla Morales, Brazilian goalkeeper Manga, Cubilla and the great Argentinean striker Artime. In the 1969 Libertadores, after defeating Peñarol in semi-finals, Nacional lost its third Finals, this time against Estudiantes de La Plata.

In 1971, coached by Washington Etchamendi, Nacional finally won its first Copa Libertadores, beating Estudiantes de La Plata in Lima, Peru. That year, Nacional won its first World Club title, the 1971 Intercontinental Cup, in memorable matches against Panathinaikos from Greece, with goals from striker Luis Artime. Panathinaikos played because the reigning European champion, AFC Ajax, refused to play due to the violent conduct common among top South American teams during this period. The following year, Nacional won its first Copa Interamericana, defeating Cruz Azul from Mexico.

During this period, Nacional also regained supremacy in the domestic field, obtaining four Uruguayan Championships in a row (1969, 70, 71 and 72), keeping an unbeaten match record against classic rivals Peñarol: between 2 March 1971 and 31 January 1974, Nacional remained undefeated in 16 games.

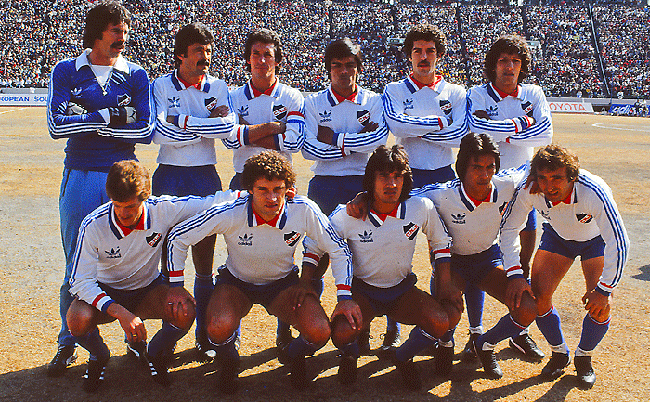
The 1980 team that repeated the achievement winning Copa Libertadores and the first Copa Intercontinental held in Tokyo

Nacional repeated its achievement in the 1980 Copa Libertadores, beating Internacional from Brazil in the finals. After becoming South American champions, Nacional won the Intercontinental Cup for the second time, defeating European champions Nottingham Forest from England 1–0, with goal by forward Waldemar Victorino. That year Nacional also won the Uruguayan championship.

Nacional won its third copa Libertadores in 1988, beating Argentine side Newell's Old Boys 3–0 in the Estadio Centenario, with goals from Ernesto Vargas, Santiago Ostolaza and Hugo De León. That same year, Nacional would contest its third Intercontinental Cup. In a breath-taking final against Dutch side PSV Eindhoven coached by Guus Hiddink, Nacional would win in the penalty shootout after the game ended 2–2 with two goals by Ostolaza (the second one scored at the last minute of overtime). The next year, Nacional won its second Copa Interamericana, this time beating C.D. Olimpia from Honduras, and the Recopa Sudamericana, defeating Racing from Argentina.

=== Recent history ===
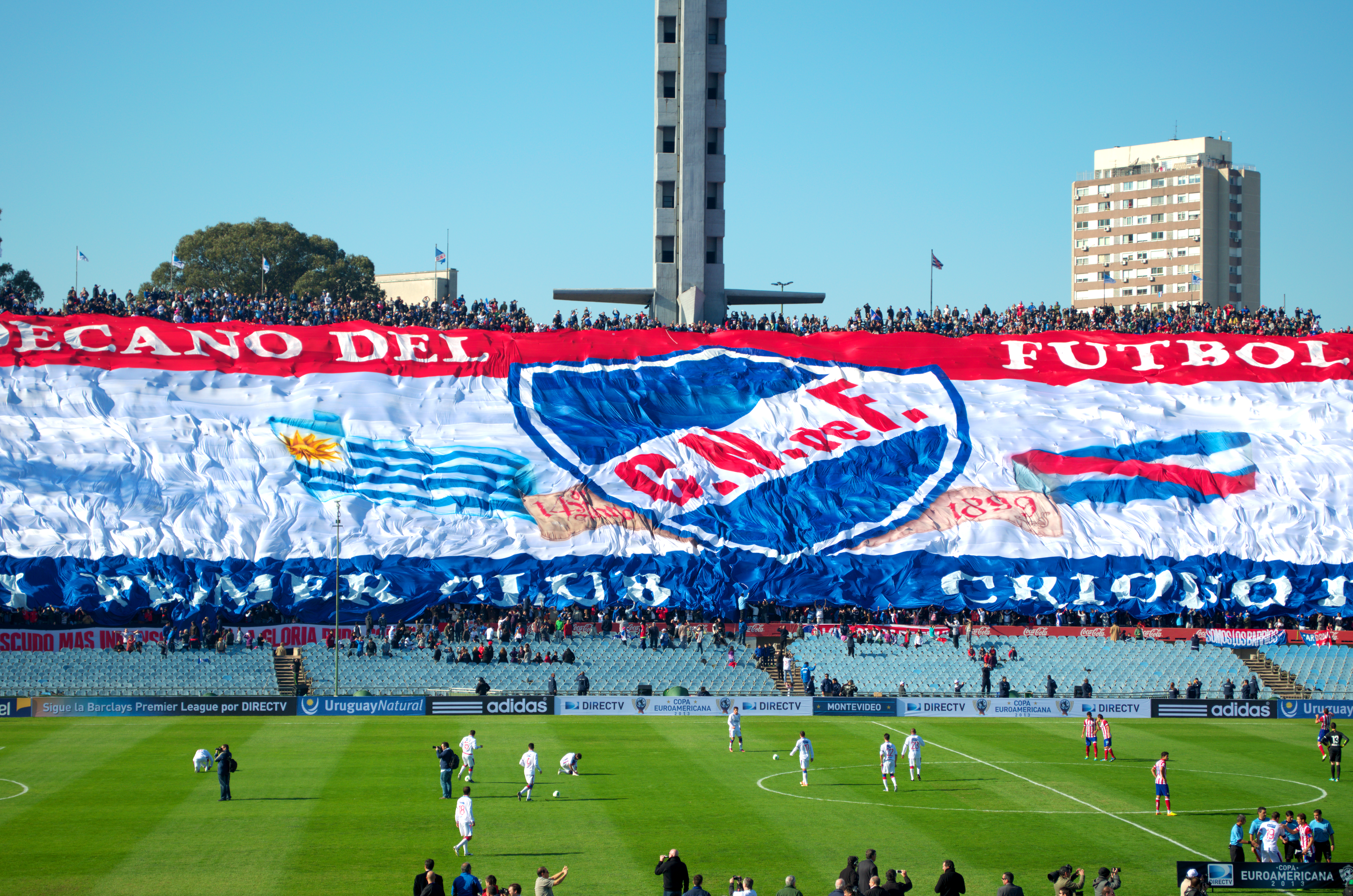
Nacional supporters at Nacional v Atlético de Madrid match, 2013 Copa EuroAmericana

In most of the 90s the club suffered a financial crisis and obtained few sportive results. It won the 1992 Championship with great performances by Julio César Dely Valdés and Antonio Vidal González. After Peñarol's second Quinquenio (1993–97) Nacional's Directive board changed: returning President Dante Iocco brought back club's idol Hugo de León as coach to prevent Peñarol from obtaining the hypothetical Sexenio. That year Nacional won the 1998 Campeonato Uruguayo by winning both short tournaments Apertura and Clausura. This was the first time any club achieved this feat since that system was implemented in 1994, having been repeated only by Danubio in 2006–07 season.

Maintaining the basis of its squad, Nacional dominated the national ambitus for three consecutive years (2000, 2001 and 2002.)

In 2005 Nacional decided to restore its stadium, the Estadio Gran Parque Central, where the team has returned to host most of their games instead of state-owned Estadio Centenario.

Nacional is the most successful team since the beginning of the century, having won also the 2005, 2005–06, 2008–09, 2010–11, 2011–12, 2014–15 and 2016 championships.

2016 was the 46th Uruguayan Championship won by Nacional. It was a one-round tournament, which marked the return of the domestic calendar to fit the calendar year instead of the European calendar.

Nacional qualified for the 2018 Copa Libertadores. It was the club's 45th appearance in the tournament, and the twenty second consecutive (a new record in the cup's history).

After Martín Lasarte's resignation, the club's board appointed former star and reserve team coach Alexander Medina as the principal team's new coach.

== Team image ==
=== Kits and crest ===
Nacional's crest features a shield with a white slash with the following "C.N de F." written on it. The crest was inspired by the Artigas flag.

The first home kit, used from the founding of the club in 1899 until 1902, utilized a red shirt, with blue sleeves and a blue collar. In March 1902, the team changed its jersey at the request of the AUF, avoiding the similarity of colours with the Albion club and also because the red shirt faded and another of better quality could not be obtained. The new uniform would be a white shirt with a front pocket (which coined the nickname "Los Bolsos" which translates to pocket in Spanish), blue pants and a red sash. In addition, the crest with the initials 'C. N de F.' was added above the shirt pocket.

In 1995, when Umbro was the kit supplier, three different uniforms were implemented, the red shirt becoming the third kit, with the official away being a new blue shirt with an almost vertical red stripe. The blue tone will last a few more years, and in 2000 a new kit was presented with light blue and dark blue tones, which imitated the format of the Pepsi brand, then the club's main sponsor. In 2002, the red kit was established as the official away kit, and since then, Nacional has two alternatives, the red one being the away, and the blue being the third.

=== Stadium ===
Nacional plays most home games at its own stadium, the Montevideo-based 38,000 (and growing) capacity Gran Parque Central (soon to be 40,089), first built in 1900. It is located in "Quinta de la Paraguaya" a historic place where an Oriental revolutionary leader José Gervasio Artigas was named "Jefe de los Orientales" in 1811. In recent decades the stadium had not been used very often because Nacional played at the national stadium Estadio Centenario, sharing it with Peñarol, but in 2005 Nacional decided to the return to the Gran Parque Central. Since then, its ongoing renovation has allowed Nacional to play most of its home domestic matches there, as well as many international matches. High-risk matches and derbies are still played at the Centenario.

The four stands of the stadium are named in memory of four symbolic figures:

- the official stand, which includes press and VIP boxes is called José María Delgado, after one of the club's most important Presidents.
- the largest stand, opposed to the Delgado, is the Atilio García, after Nacional's all-time top scorer.
- the Abdón Porte, after one of Nacional's biggest symbols: a player who after being relegated from the team shot himself dead in the center of the field. This is the stand where the organized supporter group attends.
- the Héctor Scarone, after another historical striker, nicknamed el Mago (the Wizard).

After the completion of the second tire of the Atilio García, Abdón Porte and Héctor Scarone stands, the current work involves the construction of a corner structure joining the Atilio García and Porte stands. Future additions include a third tire on the three aforementioned stands.

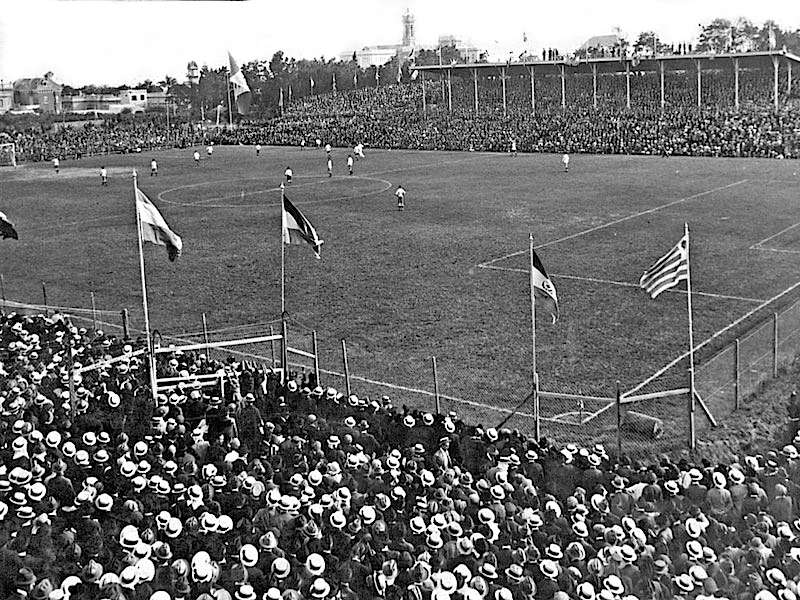
Hosting the 1923 Copa América

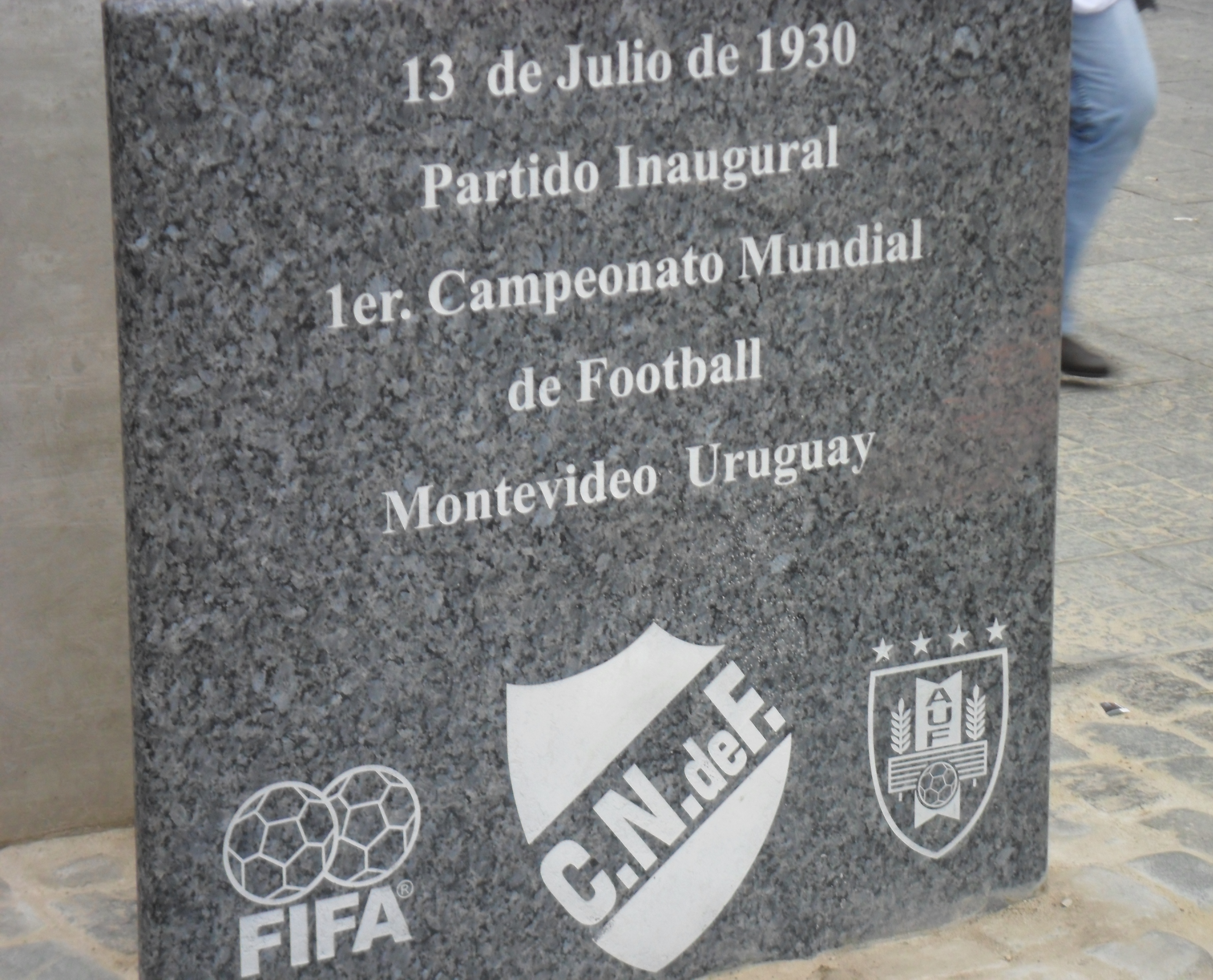
A plaque commemorating the 1930 world championship of fútbol

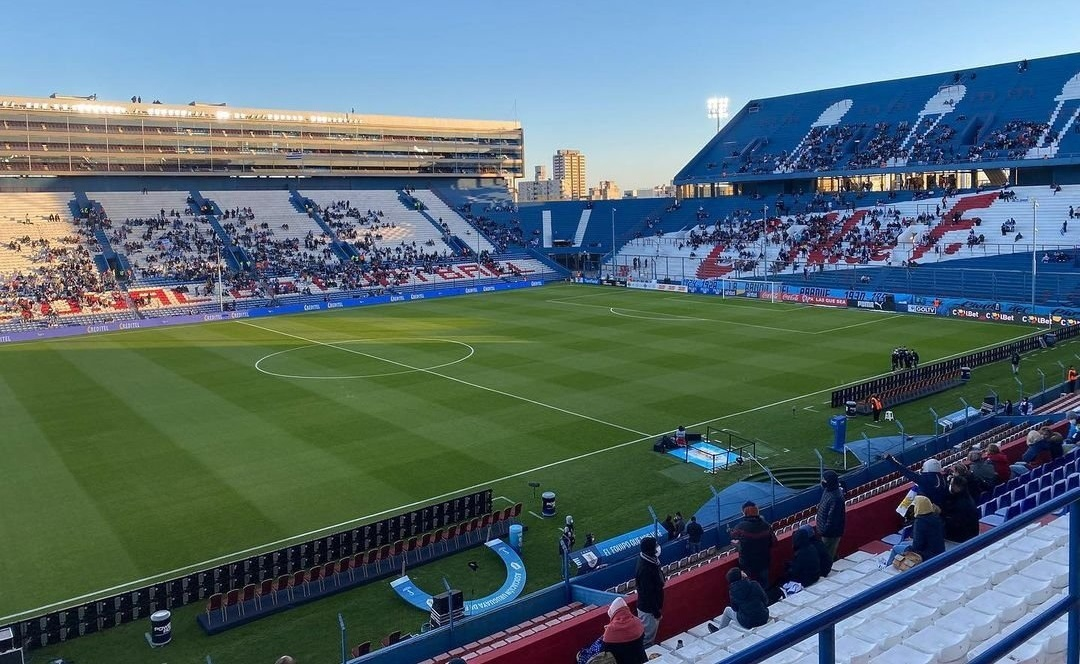
In 2022

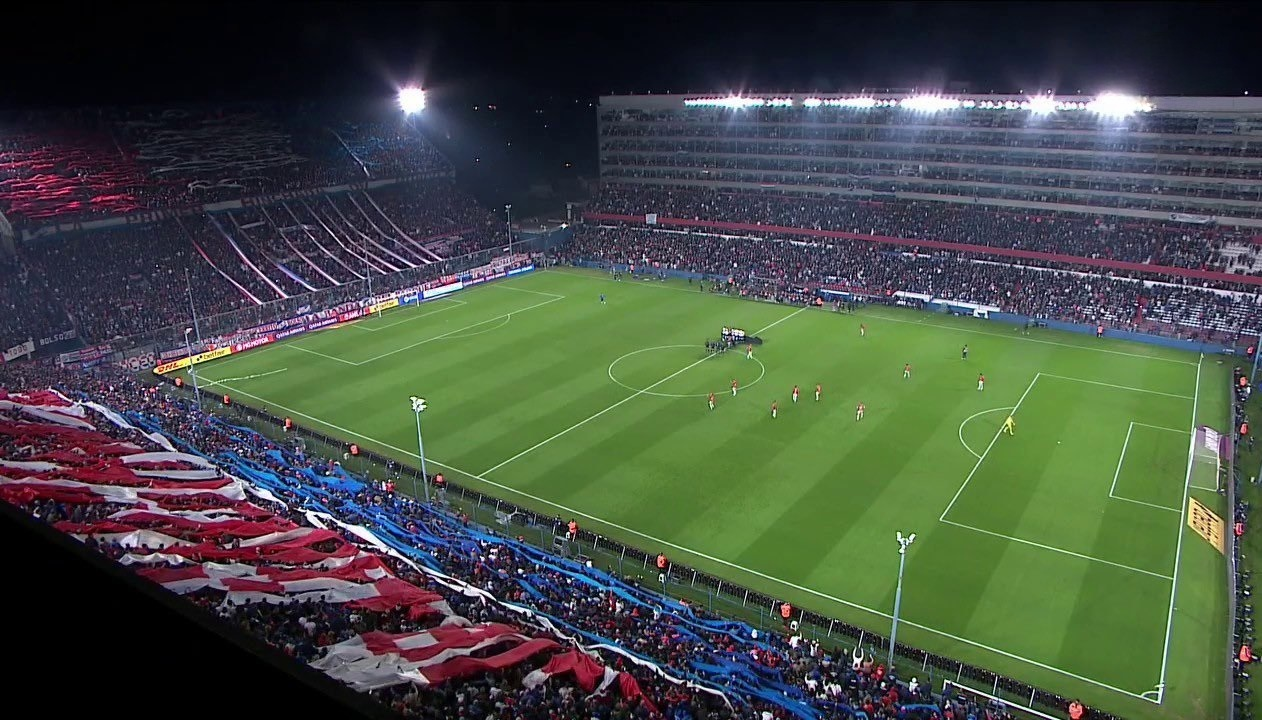
In 2023

== Supporters ==
=== The First "Hincha" ===
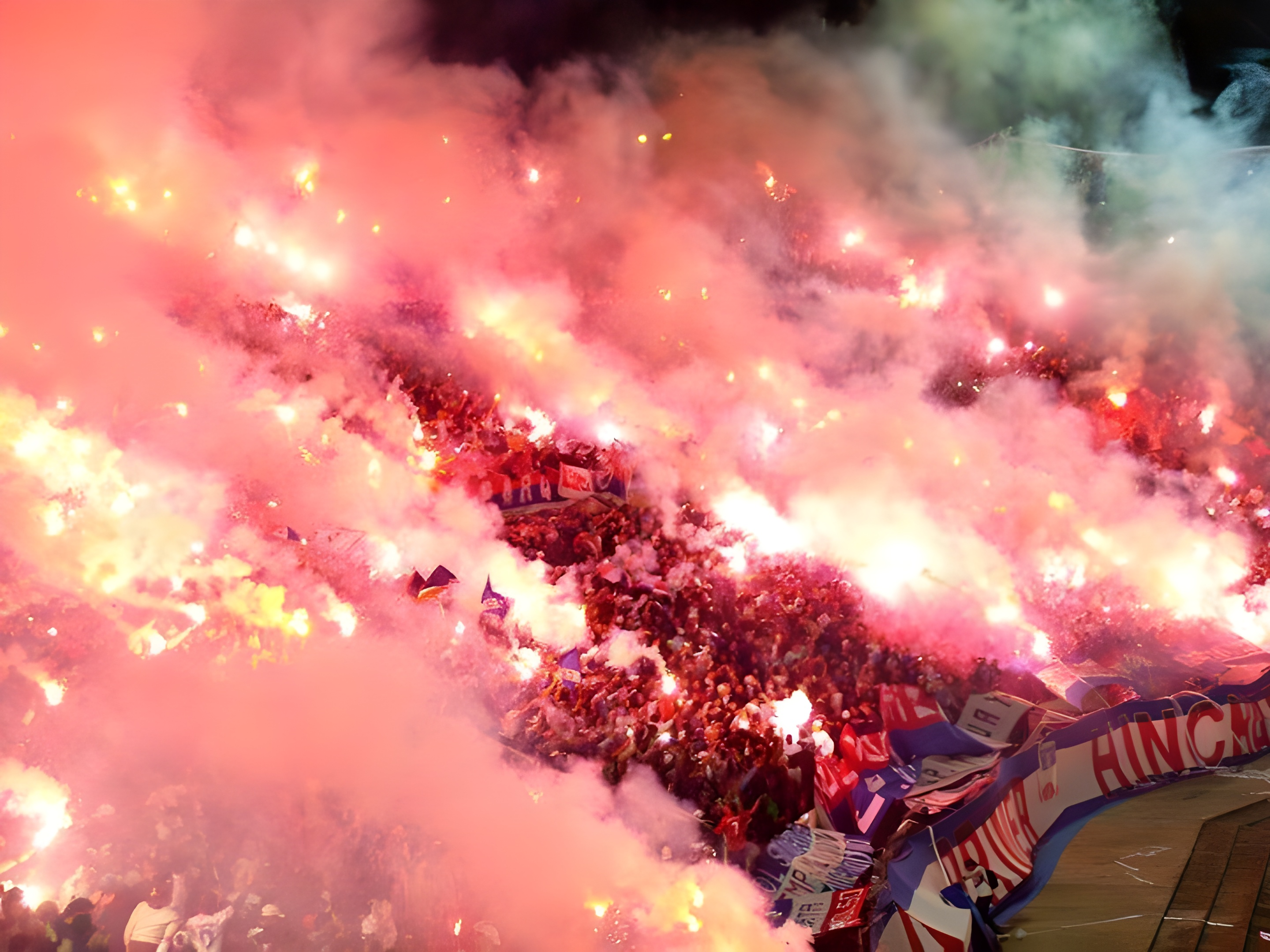

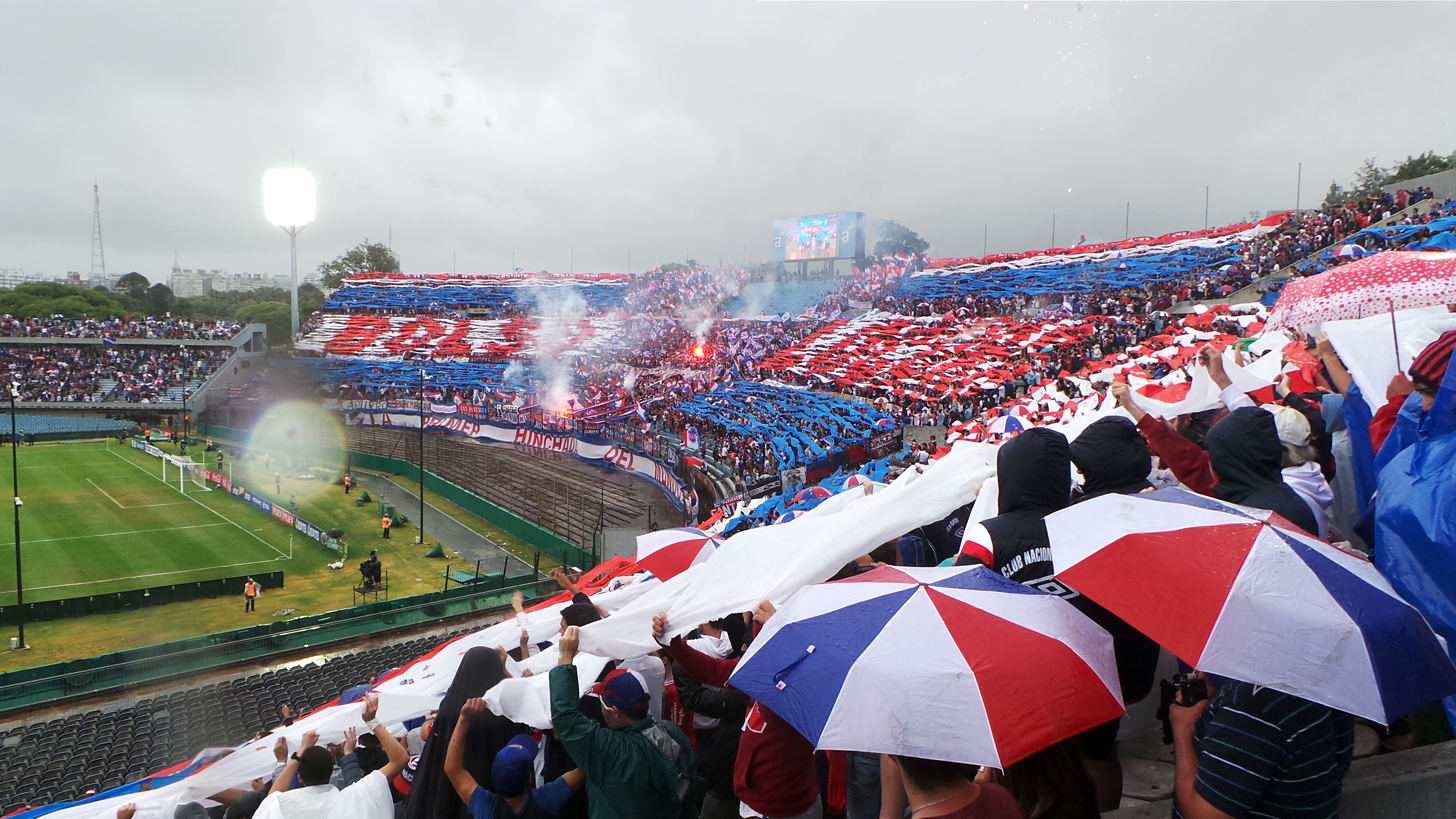

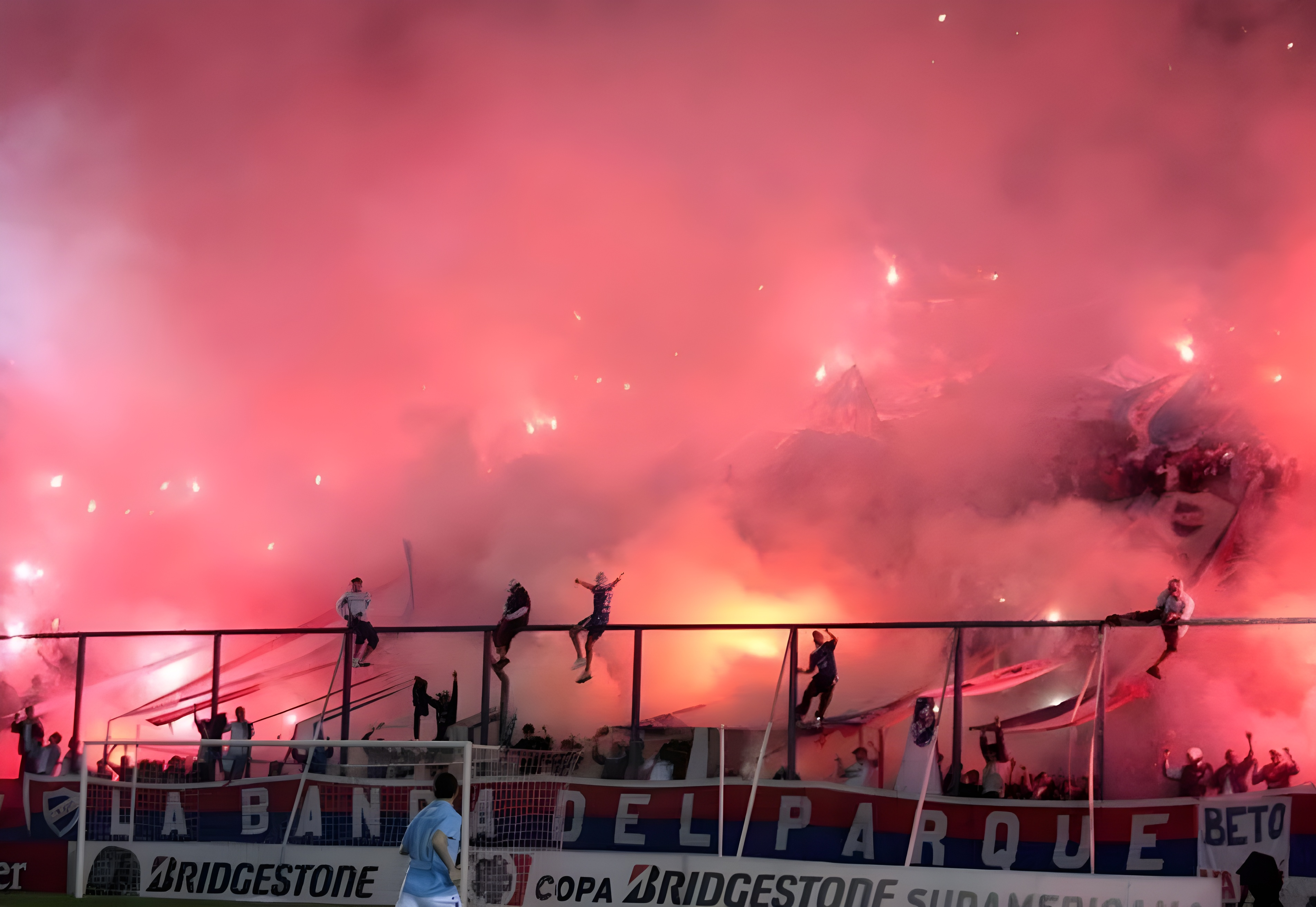

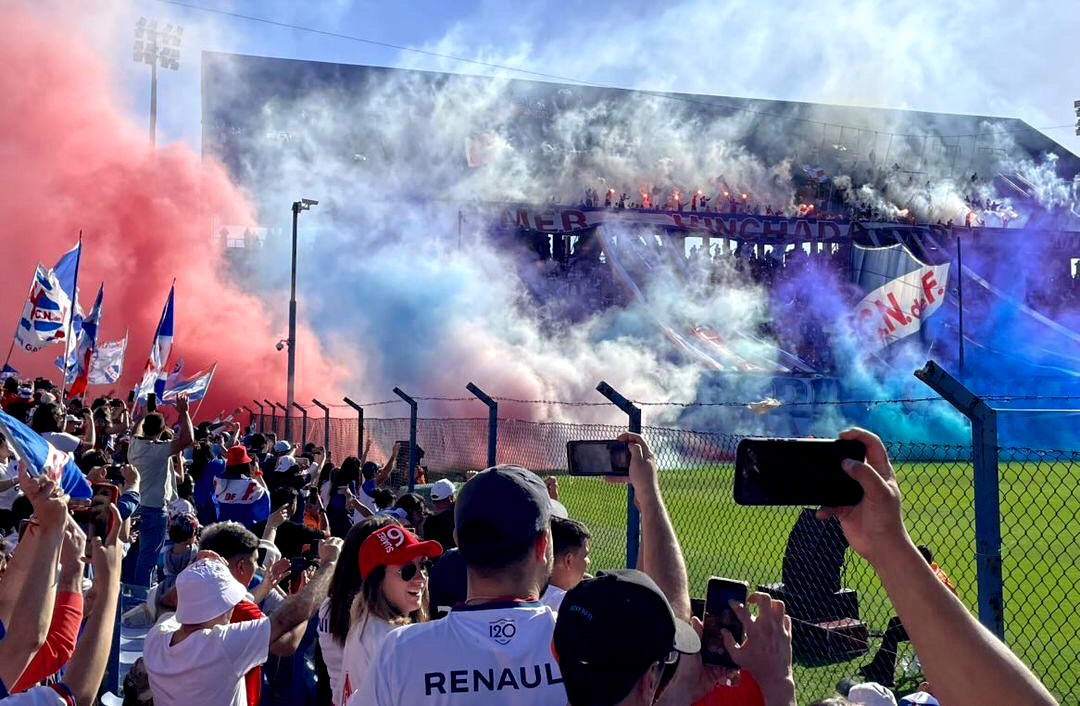

The Spanish word to describe football fans is "hincha", and it was coined by Nacional fans. An employee of Nacional of the early 20th century, Prudencio Miguel Reyes, was famous for his continuous support to the team. The other fans that attended the games started to call him by one of his duties: pumping air to the balls (in Spanish: "inflar" the balls, in Uruguay: "hinchar" the balls). Within a few games, Reyes was known as the "hincha" of Nacional. This is the origin of a word that is frequently used by Spanish speakers worldwide.

=== "The biggest flag in the world" ===
In June 2013, Nacional supporters displayed for the first time the biggest flag in the world as they called the emblem during a match vs. Deportivo Toluca played for the 2013 Copa Libertadores. The flag cost US$50,000, previously collected amongst the supporters La Banda Del Parque The flag, 600 meters in length and 50 meters in height, entered the Guinness World Records as "the biggest flag ever seen in a football match".

The flag also weighed 5,000 kg, with 400 people being needed to move it. La Banda Del Parque

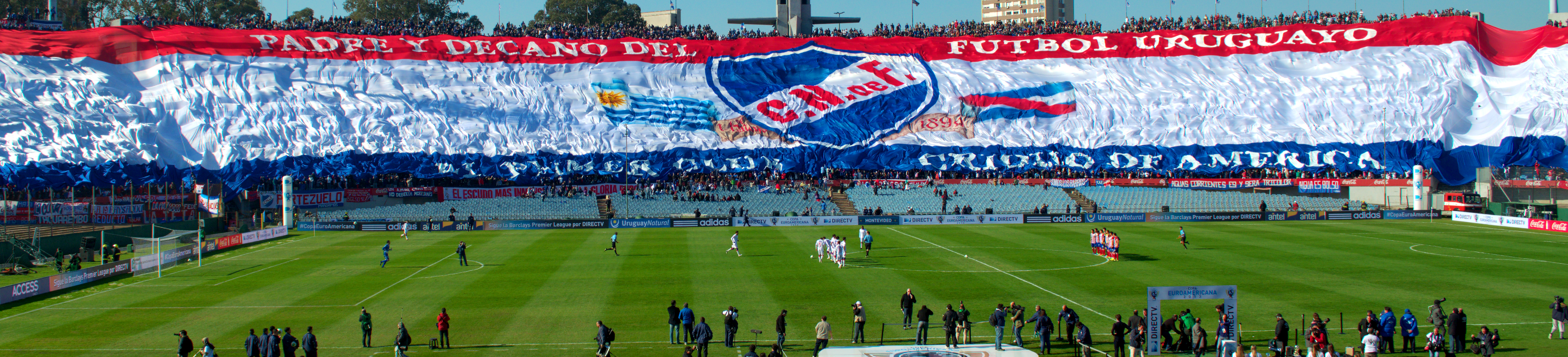
Panorama of the "biggest flag in the world", as seen at the Estadio Centenario in March 2013.

== Nicknames ==
Nacional is nicknamed "tricolores" ("three colours"), "albos" ("whites") and "bolsilludos", later shortened to "bolsos" ("bolsillo" being the Spanish word for pocket – Nacional used to play with a jersey that had a pocket on the chest). "La blanca" (another reference to the white jersey) is less common.

== Players ==
=== Current squad ===
As of 30 September 2026

Note: Flags indicate national team as defined under FIFA eligibility rules; some limited exceptions apply. Players may hold more than one non-FIFA nationality.

No.	Pos.	Nation	Player
1	GK	PAN	Luis Mejía
2	DF	URU	Agustín Rogel
4	DF	URU	Sebastián Coates (captain)
5	DF	CRC	Francisco Calvo
6	MF	URU	Luciano Boggio
7	DF	URU	Nicolás Rodríguez
8	MF	URU	Santiago Silva (on loan from Huachipato)
9	FW	URU	Maxi Gómez
10	MF	URU	Agustín Dos Santos
11	FW	URU	Maximiliano Silvera
13	DF	URU	Emiliano Ancheta
14	FW	ARG	Alejandro Martínez (on loan from Talleres)
15	DF	URU	Gastón Martirena (on loan from Racing de Avellaneda)
18	FW	URU	Pavel Núñez

No.	Pos.	Nation	Player
20	MF	ARG	Rubén Botta
21	DF	URU	Camilo Cándido
22	GK	ARG	Alexis Martín Arias
23	MF	URU	Lucas Rodríguez
24	DF	URU	Benjamín Núñez
25	GK	URU	Ignacio Suárez
27	FW	ARG	Tomás Verón Lupi (on loan from Grasshopper)
29	FW	URU	Tiziano Correa (on loan from Cerro Largo)
31	FW	URU	Rodrigo Martínez
32	DF	URU	Tomás Viera
36	MF	ARG	Bruno Zuculini
39	MF	URU	Luciano González
56	MF	URU	Juan Ignacio García
77	FW	URU	Nahuel Gelos (on loan from Miramar)

=== Out on loan ===
Note: Flags indicate national team as defined under FIFA eligibility rules; some limited exceptions apply. Players may hold more than one non-FIFA nationality.

No.	Pos.	Nation	Player
30	FW	URU	Baltasar Barcia (at Albion until 31 December 2026)
33	DF	COL	Juan Patiño (at Once Caldas until 31 December 2026)
80	MF	VEN	Rómulo Otero (at Criciúma until 31 December 2026)

=== Retired numbers ===
Note: Flags indicate national team as defined under FIFA eligibility rules; some limited exceptions apply. Players may hold more than one non-FIFA nationality.

No.	Pos.	Nation	Player
3	DF	URU	Juan Izquierdo (2024 – posthumous honour)

=== Records ===
- Most appearances: (Uruguay) Emilio Álvarez (511 matches played)
- Most years with the club: (Uruguay) Héctor Scarone (21 years), (1917 to 1939)
- All-time greatest goalscorer: (Argentina) Atilio García (465 goals)
- Longest time without conceding a goal: (Uruguay) Sergio Rochet (1064 minutes)

==== World Champion players ====
In 1924, Nacional was the club that contributed more players to Uruguay's team that won the Olympic gold medal in football of that year. It happened again with Uruguay's teams of 1928 and 1930, Olympic and world champions respectively, in which Nacional contributed the majority of players. Nacional is the only Uruguayan club that contributed players to every Uruguay national team that went on to win international tournaments.

Below, the list of Nacional players that were part of Uruguay's Olympic and world champions teams.

1924 Olympic champions

- Andrés Mazali
- Ángel Romano
- Héctor Scarone
- Pascual Somma
- Santos Urdinarán
- Alfredo Zibechi

1928 Olympic champions

- José Leandro Andrade
- Héctor Castro
- Pedro Cea
- Andrés Mazali
- Pedro Petrone
- Juan Píriz
- Héctor Scarone
- Santos Urdinarán

1930 FIFA World Cup champions

- José Leandro Andrade
- Héctor Castro
- Pedro Cea
- Pedro Petrone
- Conduelo Píriz
- Emilio Recoba
- Zoilo Saldombide
- Héctor Scarone
- Santos Urdinarán

1950 FIFA World Cup champions

- Schubert Gambetta
- Aníbal Paz
- Julio Pérez
- Rodolfo Pini
- Eusebio Tejera

== Notable coaches ==
- Emilio Servetti Mitre (1927) (during the United States tour 1927)
- (Uruguay) Ondino Viera (1930–33)
- (Uruguay) Carlos Scarone (1932–??)
- (Hungary) Américo Szigeti (1933–34)
- (Scotland) William Reaside (1938–39)
- (Uruguay) Héctor Castro (1939–43)
- (Uruguay) Enrique Fernández (1946)
- (Uruguay) Ricardo Faccio (1947)
- (Uruguay) Enrique Fernández (1950–52)
- (Uruguay) Héctor Castro (1952)
- (Uruguay) Héctor Scarone (1954)
- (Argentina) Adolfo Pedernera (1955)
- (Uruguay) Ondino Viera (1955–60)
- (Uruguay) Roberto Porta (1961)
- (Uruguay) Hugo Bagnulo (1962)
- (Brazil) Zezé Moreira (1963)
- (Chile) Fernando Riera (1966)
- (Uruguay) Roberto Scarone (1966–67)
- (Brazil) Zezé Moreira (1968–69)
- (Uruguay) Washington Etchamendi (1970–72)
- (Uruguay) Juan Hohberg (1976)
- (Argentina) Pedro Dellacha (1977)
- (Uruguay) Juan Martín Mujica (1980–81)
- (Argentina) Alfio Basile (1982)
- (Uruguay) Juan Masnik (1982)
- (Uruguay) Víctor Espárrago (1983), (1985)
- (Uruguay) Sergio Markarián (1987)
- (Uruguay) Saul Rivero (1987–88)
- (Uruguay) Roberto Fleitas (1988)
- (Uruguay) Héctor Núñez (1989)
- (Argentina) Alfio Basile (1990–91)
- (Uruguay) Roberto Fleitas (1991–93)
- (Uruguay) Miguel Ángel Piazza (1993)
- (Uruguay) Héctor Salva (interim) (1993)
- (Uruguay) Eduardo Luján Manera (1994)
- (Uruguay) Hugo Fernández (1994–95)
- (Uruguay) Héctor Salva (1995–96)
- (Uruguay) Miguel Puppo (1996–97)
- (Uruguay) Roberto Fleitas (1997)
- (Uruguay) Hugo De León (1998–01)
- (Uruguay) Daniel Carreño (2002–03)
- (Uruguay) Santiago Ostolaza (2004)
- (Uruguay) Hugo De León (2004)
- (Uruguay) Martín Lasarte (2005–06)
- (Uruguay) Daniel Carreño (1 January 2007 – 1 October 2007)
- (Uruguay) Gerardo Pelusso (9 October 2007 – 5 August 2009)
- (Uruguay) Luis González (interim) (2009)
- (Uruguay) Eduardo Acevedo (1 August 2009 – 7 September 2010)
- (Uruguay) Luis González (2010)
- (Uruguay) Juan Ramón Carrasco (13 October 2010 – 17 June 2011)
- (Argentina) Marcelo Gallardo (1 July 2011 – 19 June 2012)
- (Uruguay) Gustavo Díaz (1 July 2012 – 4 March 2013)
- (Uruguay) Juan Carlos Blanco (int.) (4 March 2013 – 6 April 2013)
- (Argentina) Rodolfo Arruabarrena (27 March 2013 – 16 December 2013)
- (Uruguay) Gerardo Pelusso (23 December 2013 – 28 April 2014)
- (Uruguay) Álvaro Gutiérrez (interim) (29 April 2014–15)
- (Uruguay) Gustavo Munúa (2015–2016)
- (Uruguay) Martín Lasarte (Jun. - Dec. 2016)
- (Uruguay) Álvaro "Chino" Recoba (2023–2024)

== Honours ==
=== Senior titles ===
Keys

- Record
- ^{(s)} Shared record

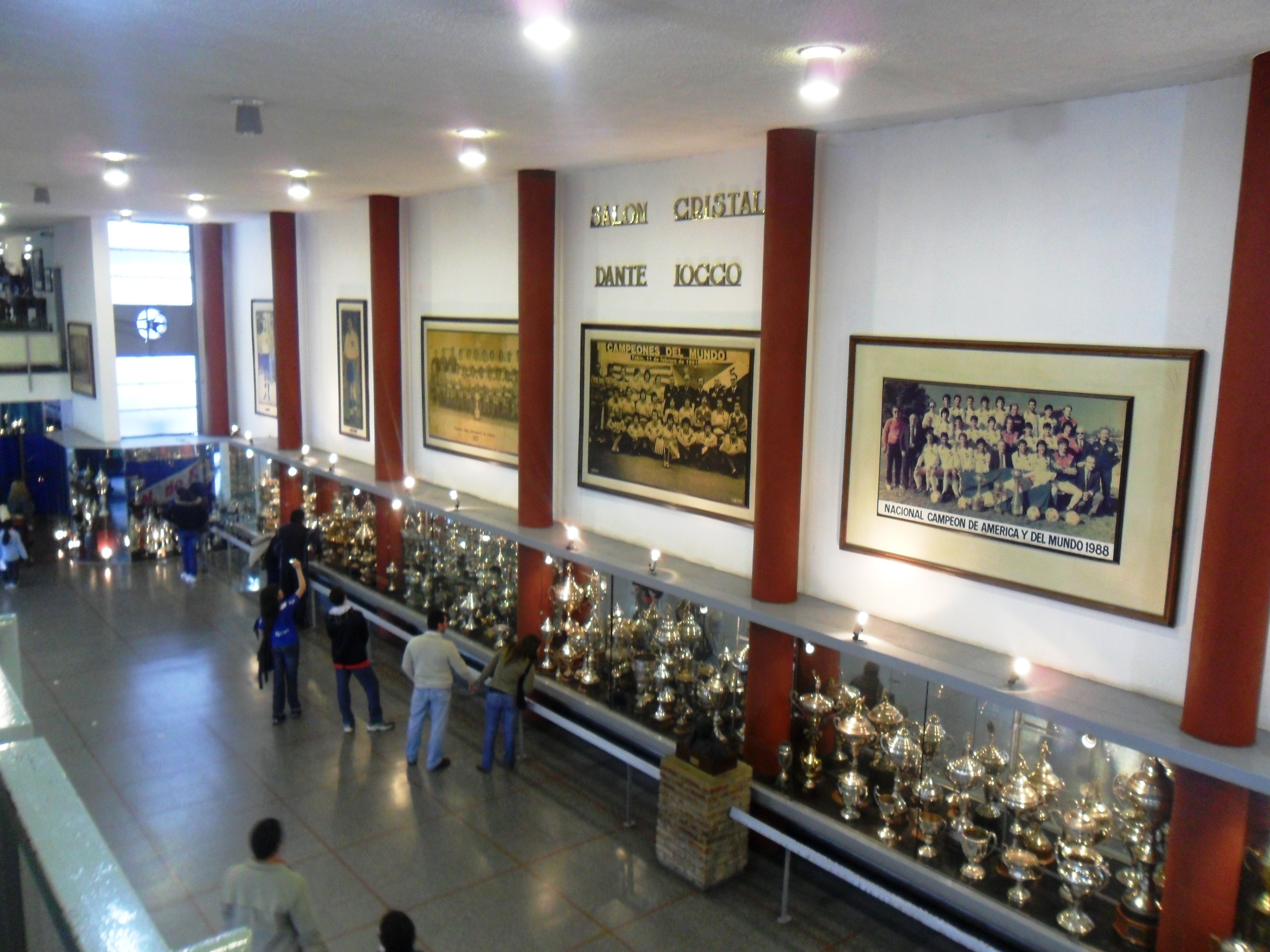
Aerial view of the trophies exhibited in 2011

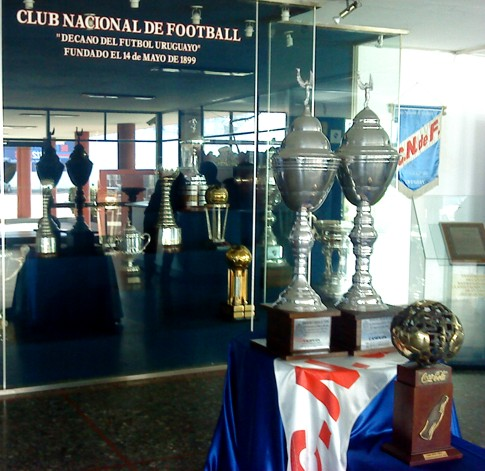
Some of the trophies won by Nacional in its history, exhibited at the club

Type	Competition	Titles	Winning years
National (League)	Primera División	50	1902, 1903, 1912, 1915, 1916, 1917, 1919, 1920, 1922, 1923, 1924, 1933, 1934, 1939, 1940, 1941, 1942, 1943, 1946, 1947, 1950, 1952, 1955, 1956, 1957, 1963, 1966, 1969, 1970, 1971, 1972, 1977, 1980, 1983, 1992, 1998, 2000, 2001, 2002, 2005, 2005–06, 2008–09, 2010–11, 2011–12, 2014–15, 2016, 2019, 2020, 2022, 2025
Half-year / Short tournament (League)	Torneo Apertura	12	1997, 1998, 1999, 2000, 2002, 2003, 2004, 2008–09, 2009–10, 2011–12, 2014–15, 2018
Half-year / Short tournament (League)	Torneo Clausura	8	1995, 1996, 1998, 2001, 2005–06, 2010–11, 2019, 2022
Half-year / Short tournament (League)	Torneo Intermedio	5	2017, 2018, 2020, 2022, 2024
National (Cups)	Supercopa Uruguaya	3^{(s)}	2019, 2021, 2025
National (Cups)	Torneo de Honor	15	1935, 1938, 1939, 1940, 1941, 1942, 1943, 1946, 1948, 1955, 1957, 1958, 1961, 1962, 1963
National (Cups)	Torneo Competencia	10	1934, 1942, 1945, 1948, 1952, 1958, 1959, 1961, 1962, 1963, 1989
National (Cups)	Liguilla Pre-Libertadores	8	1982, 1990, 1992, 1993, 1996, 1999, 2007, 2008
National (Cups)	Copa Competencia	7	1912, 1913, 1914, 1915, 1919, 1921, 1923
National (Cups)	Copa de Honor	7	1905, 1906, 1913, 1914, 1915, 1916, 1917
National (Cups)	Torneo Cuadrangular	7	1952, 1954, 1956, 1958, 1961, 1964, 1967
National (Cups)	Liga Mayor	3	1975, 1976, 1977
National (Cups)	Copa León Peyrou	3	1920, 1921, 1922
National (Cups)	Campeonato Nacional General Artigas	2	1961, 1962
National (Cups)	Campeonato Ingeniero José Serrato	1	1928
National (Cups)	Copa Albion de Caridad	1	1919
National (Cups)	Torneo Fermín Garicoits	1	1965
National (Cups)	Torneo Ciudad de Montevideo	1	1973
National (Cups)	Torneo Campeones Olímpicos	1	1974
National (Cups)	Campeonato Estadio Centenario	1	1983
International (Cups)	Intercontinental Cup	3^{(s)}	1971, 1980, 1988
International (Cups)	Copa Libertadores	3	1971, 1980, 1988
International (Cups)	Copa Interamericana	2	1971, 1988
International (Cups)	Recopa Sudamericana	1	1989
International (Cups)	Copa Aldao	3	1916, 1919, 1920
International (Cups)	Copa de Honor Cousenier	4	1905, 1915, 1916, 1917
International (Cups)	Tie Cup	2	1913, 1915
International (Cups)	Copa de Confraternidad Escobar-Gerona	1	1945

==== International friendlies ====
Type	Competition	Titles	Winning years
International (Cup)	Copa Ciudad de Montevideo	5	1953, 1969, 1970, 1978, 1984
International (Cup)	Torneo Internacional Nocturno Rioplatense	1	1938

=== Youth tournaments ===
Type	Competition	Titles	Winning years
International (Cup)	U-20 Copa Libertadores	1	2018
International (Cup)	Copa Santiago de Futebol Juvenil	2	1989, 1994

== Other sports ==
=== Basketball ===
Nacional participates in the tournaments organised by the Uruguayan basketball federation Federación Uruguaya de Basketball (known as FUBB) since 1932. The club won the championships of 1935 and 1937. Nowadays, Nacional takes part in the Liga Uruguaya de Basketball, Uruguayan basketball first division.

- Campeonato Federal (2): 1935 y 1937.
- Liguilla (2): 1982 y 1983.

=== Cycling ===
Nacional participates in the championships organised by the Uruguayan Cycling Federation Federación Ciclista del Uruguay since its beginnings. The club won the most important competitions in several occasions: Vuelta Ciclista del Uruguay and Rutas de América, individually and by teams. Nowadays, Nacional cycling team has the presence of Milton Wynants, winner of a silver medal for Uruguay in the 2000 Summer Olympics.

Vuelta Ciclista del Uruguay (9)

- Teams (5): 1960, 1968, 1994, 1999, 2000
- Individual (3)

Leandro Noli: 1939
Jorge Correa: 1968
Milton Wynants: 1996

Rutas de América (6)

- Teams (5): 1993, 1994, 1995, 2000 y 2001.
- General Individual (1)

Gustavo Figueredo: 2000

Mil Millas Orientales (1)

- General Individual (1)

Tomás Correa: 1960

Vuelta Ciclista del Paraguay (2)

- Teams (1): 1998
- Individual (1)

Gustavo Figueredo: 1998

=== Rugby ===
In April 2019, Nacional had announced that they would form a rugby union section to compete in the 2020 season of the Súper Liga Americana de Rugby. Nevertheless, it never occurred so Peñarol remained as the only Uruguayan representative in the league.

=== Tennis ===
Nacional has a lot of tennis courts in Parque Central, behind the stand Abdón Porte, in which several stages of the tournaments organised in Uruguay are disputed. In 2005, the club had the honour of holding various games played by Uruguay in the American Zone II of Davis Cup.

=== Volleyball ===
Nacional has its volleyball court in Parque Central, in the gymnasium of Jaime Cibils street. In that stadium, the club plays its home games of the championships organised by the Uruguayan volleyball federation Federación Uruguaya de Vóleibol in every category.

==== Men (9) ====
- Campeonato Federal (1): 1954.
- Super Liga Uruguaya de Voleibol (3): 2008, 2009, 2010.
- Campeonato Uruguayo Livosur (1): 2010.
- Torneo Apertura Livosur (2): 2009, 2010.
- Torneo Clausura Livosur (2): 2006, 2008.

==== Women (4) ====
- Campeonato Federal (3): 1955, 1960, 1961.
- Torneo Abierto ciudad de Minas: 2011

=== Women's football ===
Nacional was part of the tournaments organised by the Department of Feminine Football of the Uruguayan Football Association, since its establishment in 1996, winning the Campeonato Uruguayo in 1997 and 2000. The club disaffiliated in 2005 and returned to the league in 2009 ending third in the annual standings. They won the championship in 2010 and 2011–2012. Internationally, Nacional played in various South American championships.

=== Official national tournaments (12) ===
- Campeonato Uruguayo (4): 1997, 2000, 2010, 2011/2012.
- Torneo Apertura (4): 1997, 1999, 2000, 2011.
- Torneo Clausura (2): 2002, 2012.
- Torneo Preparación Joseph Blatter (2): 2010, 2011.

==== Other national tournaments (3) ====
- Triangular Día Internacional de la Mujer (ciudad de Minas, departamento de Lavalleja) (1): 2011
- Triangular Internacional Diego Rodríguez (Rivera) (1): 2011
- Triangular Triangular Confraternidad en Artigas (1): 2012

==== International friendly tournaments (1) ====
- Cuadrangular Internacional Ciudad de San Nicolás de los Arroyos (Argentina) (1): 2011

==== Youth tournaments (3) ====
- Torneo Apertura Sub 18 (1): 2004
- Torneo Preparación Bicentenario Sub 16 (1): 2011
- Triangular Internacional Diego Rodríguez Sub 16 (1): 2011

=== Futsal ===
Nacional participates in the championships organised by de Futsal Delegated Commission of the Uruguayan Football Association. The club won the Uruguayan league title in various occasions and is nowadays the Uruguayan champion. Internationally, Nacionals main achievement is the second place in the South American Futsal Cup Copa Libertadores de América de Futsal in 2003.

=== Affiliate FIFUSA – AMF / FUdeFS ===
==== Official national tournaments (10) ====
- Campeonato Metropolitano (8): 1990, 1991, 1992, 1993, 1994, 1995, 1996 y 1997.
- Campeonato Nacional de Clubes Campeones (2): 1994, 1997.

==== Official international tournaments(1) ====
- Campeonato Sudamericano de Clubes Campeones: 1996.

=== Affiliate FIFA / AUF ===
==== Official national tournaments (23) ====
- Campeonato Uruguayo (7): 1998, 2000, 2002, 2003, 2005, 2008 y 2009.
- Campeonato Metropolitano (5): 2002, 2004, 2005, 2007 y 2009.
- Copa de Honor (Liguilla Pre Libertadores) (3): 2006, 2010, 2011.
- Campeonato Apertura (5): 1998, 2000, 2005, 2008 y 2009.
- Campeonato Clausura (3): 1998, 2002 y 2009.

==== Official international tournaments (1) ====
- Ganador de la Zona Sur de la Copa Libertadores de Futsal: 2003.

== See also ==
- Club Nacional de Football (women)
- Club Nacional de Football (basketball)
- List of world champion football clubs
