= Huracán Buceo =

Uruguayan football club

- Full name: Club Social y Deportivo Huracán Buceo
- Nicknames: Funebreros; Tricoplayeros
- Founded: July 10, 1937; 88 years ago
- Ground: Parque Huracán; Montevideo, Uruguay
- Capacity: 10,000
- Chairman: (Uruguay) Mario Migues
- Coach: (Uruguay) Enrique Peña
- League: Disenrolled
Home colours	Away colours

Huracán Buceo is a multisports club, best known for its football side, located in Montevideo in Uruguay. In 2009 the team went into a financial crisis and couldn't play anymore in the professional competitions and played further in the amateur leagues. Handball is also a main sport for the club contributing many players to the national team.

Huracán is known as "Tricoplayeros" (a word that joins two senses: three-coloured uniform and the fact that the club was originally based next to the coast of Montevideo).

Ricardo Guero Rodriguez played for the youth team, before continuing his career in Mexico.

Huracán archrivals are Basañez and Club Atlético Bella Vista. The official mascot of the club is Topo Gigio.

== Performance in CONMEBOL competitions ==
- Copa CONMEBOL: 1 appearance

1998: Second Round

== Titles ==
- Uruguayan Second Division: 2

1969, 1995

- Divisional Intermedia: 2

1960, 1967
