= William Gutiérrez =

Uruguayan footballer (born 1963)

Personal information
- Full name: William Gonzalo Gutiérrez Cabrera
- Date of birth: 29 March 1963 (age 63)
- Place of birth: Mercedes, Uruguay
- Height: 1.80 m (5 ft 11 in)
- Position: Forward

Youth career
- Club Sendas (five-a-side)
- La Lancha (five-a-side)

College career
Years	Team	Apps	(Gls)
- Defensor Universitario

Senior career*
Years	Team	Apps	(Gls)
1984–1987	El Tanque Sisley		
1988	Sporting Barranquilla		
1989	Progreso		
1990	Nacional	12	(3)
1990–1991	Defensor Sporting		
1992	Deportes Temuco	5	(0)
1992	Central Español		
1993	Basáñez		
1994	Herediano		
- Cobán Imperial
- Real España
- El Roble
- Juventud Las Piedras
1998	Frontera Rivera		
1999	Club Artesano		

International career
1991	Uruguay	7	(0)

Managerial career
- Adrestia FC
- * Club domestic league appearances and goals

William Gonzalo Gutiérrez Cabrera (born March 29, 1963, in Palmitas, western Uruguay) is a former Uruguayan footballer. He was also a basketball player.

== Club career ==
Born in Mercedes, Uruguay, Gutiérrez began playing baby-fútbol (five-a-side football) for both Club Sendas and La Lancha in his youth. At university level, he represented Defensor Universitario, winning the Liga Universitaria and the Campeón de Campeones.

At senior level, he started his career with El Tanque Sisley, winning the 1986 Segunda División Amateur. Subsequently, he moved to Colombia and joined Sporting Barranquilla in the top division. Back to Uruguay, he won the 1989 Primera División with Progreso. In 1990, he joined Nacional, switching to Defensor Sporting in the second half of the same year, with whom he won the 1991 Primera División.

In 1992, he moved abroad again and signed with Chilean club Deportes Temuco. Back to Uruguay, he played for Central Español and Basáñez, winning the 1993 Primera B.

Following to play for Basáñez, he played in Central America for Herediano in Costa Rica, Cobán Imperial in Guatemala, Real España in Honduras and El Roble in El Salvador.

Gutiérrez ended his career with Juventud Las Piedras, Frontera Rivera, with whom he got promotion to the top division, and Club Artesano in his homeland.

== International career ==
Gutiérrez made seven appearances for the senior Uruguay national football team during 1991.

== Coaching career ==
He has served as assistant coach for Adrestia FC, a club in the United Premier Soccer League.

He started a football academy called "Uruguay Soccer Academy".

== Basketball career ==
Gutiérrez developed a career in basketball until the age of 23, at the same time he played football for Defensor Universitario and El Tanque Sisley. As a youth basketball player, Gutiérrez spent thirteen years with Club Praga in his hometown. At the age of 16, he joined Bohemios in Montevideo, with whom he won three national youth championships and two more championships with the reserve team. At senior level, he won three federal championships (1981, 1983, 1984) and two minileagues.

== Personal life ==
Gutiérrez made his home in Hollywood, Florida, United States.

== Honours ==
=== Football ===
Defensor Universitario

- Liga Universitaria: 198?
- Campeón de Campeones: 198?

El Tanque Sisley

- Uruguayan Segunda División Amateur: 1986

Progreso

- Uruguayan Primera División: 1989

Defensor Sporting

- Uruguayan Primera División: 1991

Basáñez

- Uruguayan Primera B: 1993

=== Basketball ===
Bohemios

- Federal Championship (3): 1981, 1983, 1984
