= Diego Dorta =

Uruguayan footballer (born 1971)

Personal information
- Full name: Diego Martín Dorta Montes
- Date of birth: December 31, 1971 (age 54)
- Place of birth: Montevideo, Uruguay
- Height: 1.80 m (5 ft 11 in)
- Position: Midfielder

Senior career*
Years	Team	Apps	(Gls)
1988–1991	Central Español		
1992–1995	Peñarol		
1995–1997	Independiente		
1998	Peñarol		

International career
1990–1996	Uruguay	23	(0)
Medal record
Representing Uruguay
Copa América
Winner	1995 Uruguay
- * Club domestic league appearances and goals

Diego Martín Dorta Montes (born 31 December 1971 in Montevideo) is a retired Uruguayan footballer who played as a midfielder. He was part of the Uruguay squad which won 1995 Copa América.

Dorta started his professional playing career in 1988 with Central Español. In 1992, he joined Peñarol where he won three consecutive league titles with the club.

After 1995 Copa América, Dorta joined Argentine club Independiente but he never fully settled, and eventually returned to Peñarol in 1998.

== Honours ==
=== Club ===
Peñarol

- Primera División Uruguaya: 1993, 1994, 1995

=== International ===
Uruguay

- Copa América: 1995
