= 1907 Campeonato Uruguayo Primera División =

7th season of the top-tier football league in Uruguay

Primera División
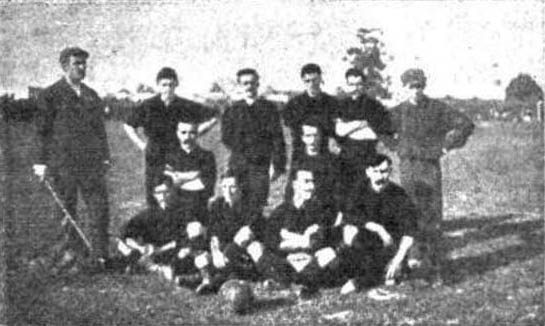
- CURCC, champions
- Season: 1907
- Champions: CURCC
- Matches: 29
- Goals: 98 (3.38 per match)
- Top goalscorer: José Zuazú (6) (Nacional)

The 1907 Primera División was the 7th. season of top-flight football in Uruguay.

== Overview ==
The tournament consisted of a round-robin championship. It involved six teams, and the champion was CURCC. This edition marked the debut of the River Plate which had risen from the second division last season (the first ascent of the story).

== Teams ==
Team	City	Stadium	Capacity	Foundation	Seasons	Consecutive seasons	Titles	1906
CURCC	Montevideo			28 September 1891	6	6	3	2nd
Intrépido	Montevideo				1	1	-	5th
Montevideo	Montevideo			1896	6	6	-	4th
Nacional	Montevideo	Gran Parque Central	7,000	14 May 1899	5	5	2	3rd
River Plate	Montevideo			1897	-	-	-	-
Montevideo Wanderers	Montevideo			15 August 1902	3	3	1	1st

== League standings ==
Pos	Team	Pld	W	D	L	GF	GA	GD	Pts
1	CURCC	10	7	3	0	29	8	+21	17
2	Montevideo Wanderers	10	4	5	1	25	5	+20	13
3	River Plate F.C.	10	5	2	3	13	10	+3	12
4	Nacional	9	3	4	2	21	7	+14	10
5	Montevideo	9	1	2	6	5	24	−19	4
6	Intrépido	10	1	0	9	5	44	−39	2

Source: rsssf.com
- The match Montevideo – Nacional was not contested.
- Promoted for next season: Bristol, Dublin, French and Albion.

1907 Primera División Champion
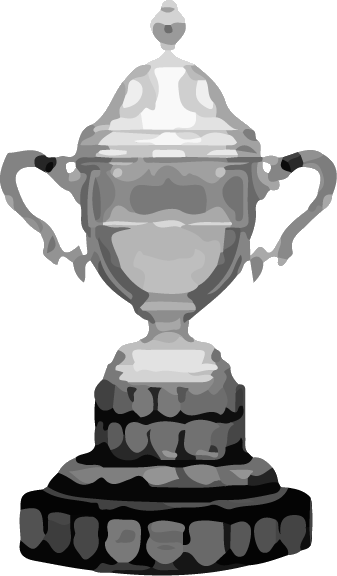

4th title
