= 1932 Campeonato Uruguayo Primera División =

29th season of the top-tier football league in Uruguay

Uruguayan Primera División
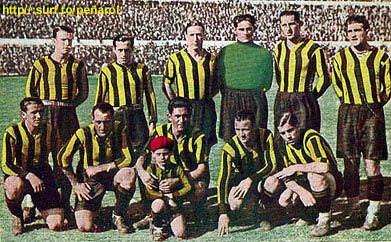
- Peñarol, champions
- Season: 1932 (29th)
- Champions: Peñarol

The Uruguayan Championship 1932 was the 29th season of Uruguay's top-flight football league.

== Overview ==
The tournament consisted of a two-wheel championship of all against all. It involved fourteen teams, and the champion was Peñarol.

== Teams ==
| Team | City | Stadium | Capacity | Foundation | Seasons | Consecutive seasons | Titles | 1931 |
|---|---|---|---|---|---|---|---|---|
| Bella Vista | Montevideo | Parque Bella Vista | ? | 4 October 1920 | 6 | 6 | - | 9th |
| Central | Montevideo | | | 5 January 1905 | 17 | 2 | - | 5th |
| Defensor | Montevideo | | | 15 March 1913 | 7 | 4 | - | 7th |
| Nacional | Montevideo | Gran Parque Central | 15,000 | 14 May 1899 | 27 | 27 | 11 | 2nd |
| Peñarol | Montevideo | | | 28 September 1891 | 26 | 4 | 9 | 4th |
| Racing | Montevideo | | | 6 April 1919 | 4 | 1 | - | 10th |
| Rampla Juniors | Montevideo | Parque Nelson | ? | 7 January 1914 | 7 | 7 | 1 | 3rd |
| River Plate | Montevideo | | | 11 May 1932 | - | - | - | - |
| Sud América | Montevideo | | | 15 February 1914 | 4 | 4 | - | 8th |
| Montevideo Wanderers | Montevideo | Estadio Belvedere | ? | 15 August 1902 | 25 | 25 | 3 | 1st |

== League standings ==
| Pos | Team | Pld | W | D | L | GF | GA | GD | Pts |
|---|---|---|---|---|---|---|---|---|---|
| 1 | Peñarol | 27 | 17 | 6 | 4 | 54 | 26 | +28 | 40 |
| 2 | Rampla Juniors | 27 | 14 | 7 | 6 | 66 | 32 | +34 | 35 |
| 3 | Nacional | 27 | 13 | 6 | 8 | 49 | 34 | +15 | 32 |
| 4 | Defensor | 27 | 12 | 7 | 8 | 51 | 41 | +10 | 31 |
| 5 | Montevideo Wanderers | 27 | 12 | 6 | 9 | 33 | 31 | +2 | 30 |
| 6 | River Plate | 27 | 12 | 3 | 12 | 37 | 42 | −5 | 27 |
| 7 | Central | 27 | 9 | 6 | 12 | 32 | 46 | −14 | 24 |
| 8 | Bella Vista | 27 | 8 | 7 | 12 | 30 | 35 | −5 | 23 |
| 9 | Sud América | 27 | 7 | 6 | 14 | 28 | 47 | −19 | 20 |
| 10 | Racing | 27 | 2 | 4 | 21 | 17 | 63 | −46 | 8 |

Source: rsssf.com

Uruguayan Champion 1932

5th title
