= 1929 Campeonato Uruguayo Primera División =

27th season of the top-tier football league in Uruguay

Uruguayan Primera División
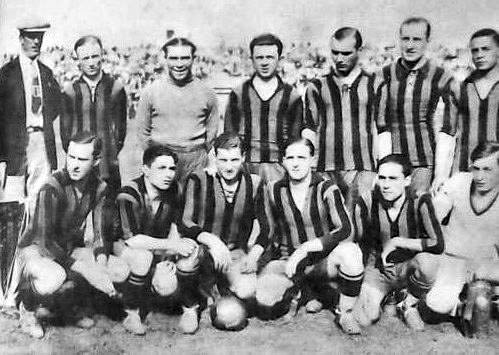
- Peñarol, champions
- Season: 1929 (27th)
- Champions: Peñarol
- Matches: 240
- Goals: 562 (2.34 per match)

The Uruguayan Championship 1929 was the 27th season of Uruguay's top-flight football league.

== Overview ==
The tournament consisted of a two-wheel championship of all against all. It involved fourteen teams, and the champion was Peñarol.

== Teams ==
Team	City	Stadium	Capacity	Foundation	Seasons	Consecutive seasons	Titles	1928
Bella Vista	Montevideo			4 October 1920	4	4	-	9th
Capurro	Montevideo			31 October 1914	2	2	-	7th
Central	Montevideo			5 January 1905	15	-	-	-
Cerro	Montevideo			1 December 1922	2	2	-	4th
Colón	Montevideo			12 March 1907	1	1	-	10th
Defensor	Montevideo			15 March 1913	5	2	-	6th
Liverpool	Montevideo			15 February 1915	7	7	-	13th
Misiones	Montevideo			26 May 1906	3	2	-	8th
Nacional	Montevideo	Gran Parque Central	15,000	14 May 1899	25	25	11	3rd
Olimpia	Montevideo			13 March 1922	2	2	-	12th
Peñarol	Montevideo			28 September 1891	24	2	8	1st
Rampla Juniors	Montevideo			7 January 1914	5	5	1	2nd
Sud América	Montevideo			15 February 1914	2	2	-	5th
Montevideo Wanderers	Montevideo			15 August 1902	23	23	2	11th

== League standings ==
Pos	Team	Pld	W	D	L	GF	GA	GD	Pts
1	Peñarol	26	21	4	1	54	10	+44	46
2	Nacional	26	15	6	5	59	24	+35	36
3	Defensor	26	11	10	5	45	33	+12	32
4	Rampla Juniors	26	13	3	10	55	34	+21	29
5	Olimpia	25	11	6	8	39	39	0	28
6	Montevideo Wanderers	26	9	10	7	33	38	−5	28
7	Capurro	26	10	6	10	38	40	−2	26
8	Misiones	26	9	7	10	32	49	−17	25
9	Bella Vista	26	8	8	10	32	35	−3	24
10	Sud América	26	9	5	12	37	36	+1	23
11	Central	26	7	7	12	35	46	−11	21
12	Liverpool	26	8	4	14	30	31	−1	20
13	Colón	26	7	4	15	33	44	−11	18
14	Cerro	26	3	2	21	24	87	−63	8

Source: rsssf.com

Uruguayan Champion 1929

4th title
