= 1975 Campeonato Uruguayo Primera División =

72nd season of the top-tier football league in Uruguay

Statistics of Primera División Uruguaya for the 1975 season.

== Overview ==
It was contested by 12 teams, and Peñarol won the championship.

== League standings ==
Pos	Team	Pld	W	D	L	GF	GA	GD	Pts
1	Peñarol	22	16	6	0	59	22	+37	38
2	Nacional	22	12	5	5	44	23	+21	29
3	Liverpool	22	11	6	5	36	21	+15	28
4	River Plate	22	8	8	6	27	32	−5	24
5	Huracán Buceo	22	10	2	10	27	34	−7	22
6	Cerro	22	8	5	9	28	35	−7	21
7	Danubio	22	7	6	9	32	31	+1	20
8	Montevideo Wanderers	22	7	5	10	30	30	0	19
9	Defensor	22	6	6	10	30	37	−7	18
10	Rentistas	22	5	6	11	35	50	−15	16
11	Racing Montevideo	22	7	2	13	33	48	−15	16
12	Fénix	22	4	5	13	24	42	−18	13

Source: rsssf.com
