= 1941 Campeonato Uruguayo Primera División =

Uruguayan Primera División
- Season: 1941
- Champions: Nacional (16th. title)

Statistics of Primera División Uruguaya for the 1941 season.

== Overview ==
It was contested by 11 teams, and Nacional won the championship. Nacional are still the only team to have scored a 100% record during a Primera Division season.

== League standings ==
Pos	Team	Pld	W	D	L	GF	GA	GD	Pts
1	Nacional	20	20	0	0	79	22	+57	40
2	Peñarol	20	15	1	4	60	31	+29	31
3	Rampla Juniors	20	8	6	6	37	33	+4	22
4	Central	20	7	5	8	29	38	−9	19
5	Sud América	20	7	5	8	32	40	−8	19
6	Racing Montevideo	20	6	6	8	38	46	−8	18
7	River Plate	20	7	3	10	35	41	−6	17
8	Liverpool	20	6	5	9	26	42	−16	17
9	Montevideo Wanderers	20	5	4	11	37	37	0	14
10	Defensor	20	4	6	10	25	44	−19	14
11	Bella Vista	20	3	3	14	21	45	−24	9

Source: rsssf.com
