= 1987 Campeonato Uruguayo Primera División =

84th season of the top-tier football league in Uruguay

Statistics of Primera División Uruguaya for the 1987 season.

== Overview ==
It was contested by 13 teams, and Defensor won the championship.

== League standings ==
| Pos | Team | Pld | W | D | L | GF | GA | GD | Pts |
|---|---|---|---|---|---|---|---|---|---|
| 1 | Defensor | 24 | 14 | 5 | 5 | 32 | 18 | +14 | 33 |
| 2 | Nacional | 24 | 13 | 4 | 7 | 40 | 23 | +17 | 30 |
| 3 | Bella Vista | 24 | 11 | 6 | 7 | 35 | 25 | +10 | 28 |
| 4 | River Plate | 24 | 12 | 4 | 8 | 36 | 34 | +2 | 28 |
| 5 | Montevideo Wanderers | 24 | 10 | 7 | 7 | 35 | 30 | +5 | 27 |
| 6 | Danubio | 24 | 10 | 5 | 9 | 29 | 21 | +8 | 25 |
| 7 | Progreso | 24 | 9 | 7 | 8 | 24 | 25 | −1 | 25 |
| 8 | Peñarol | 24 | 8 | 7 | 9 | 26 | 28 | −2 | 23 |
| 9 | Cerro | 24 | 6 | 9 | 9 | 18 | 24 | −6 | 21 |
| 10 | Central Español | 24 | 8 | 3 | 13 | 16 | 27 | −11 | 19 |
| 11 | Miramar Misiones | 24 | 5 | 8 | 11 | 31 | 42 | −11 | 18 |
| 12 | Huracán Buceo | 24 | 6 | 6 | 12 | 16 | 29 | −13 | 18 |
| 13 | Rampla Juniors | 24 | 4 | 9 | 11 | 19 | 31 | −12 | 17 |

Source: rsssf.com
