= 1943 Campeonato Uruguayo Primera División =

40th season of the top-tier football league in Uruguay

Uruguayan Primera División
- Season: 1943
- Champions: Nacional (18th. title)

Statistics of Primera División Uruguaya for the 1943 season.

== Overview ==
It was contested by 10 teams, and Nacional won the championship.

== League standings ==
Pos	Team	Pld	W	D	L	GF	GA	GD	Pts
1	Nacional	18	15	2	1	57	23	+34	32
2	Peñarol	18	12	3	3	61	22	+39	27
3	Miramar	18	8	1	9	29	45	−16	17
4	Defensor	18	6	4	8	27	32	−5	16
5	Montevideo Wanderers	18	6	4	8	28	35	−7	16
6	Liverpool	18	6	3	9	28	36	−8	15
7	Central	18	6	3	9	30	41	−11	15
8	Racing Montevideo	18	6	3	9	28	46	−18	15
9	Sud América	18	5	4	9	27	33	−6	14
10	Rampla Juniors	18	5	3	10	28	30	−2	13

Source: rsssf.com
