= 1974 Campeonato Uruguayo Primera División =

71st season of the top-tier football league in Uruguay

Statistics of Primera División Uruguaya for the 1974 season.

== Overview ==
It was contested by 12 teams, and Peñarol won the championship.

== League standings ==
| Pos | Team | Pld | W | D | L | GF | GA | GD | Pts |
|---|---|---|---|---|---|---|---|---|---|
| 1 | Peñarol | 22 | 16 | 4 | 2 | 51 | 21 | +30 | 36 |
| 2 | Nacional | 22 | 14 | 3 | 5 | 45 | 25 | +20 | 31 |
| 3 | Liverpool | 22 | 14 | 3 | 5 | 47 | 29 | +18 | 31 |
| 4 | Bella Vista | 22 | 7 | 10 | 5 | 31 | 30 | +1 | 24 |
| 5 | Defensor | 22 | 5 | 11 | 6 | 23 | 26 | −3 | 21 |
| 6 | Danubio | 22 | 7 | 6 | 9 | 32 | 32 | 0 | 20 |
| 7 | Montevideo Wanderers | 22 | 5 | 8 | 9 | 21 | 25 | −4 | 18 |
| 8 | Fénix | 22 | 5 | 8 | 9 | 20 | 30 | −10 | 18 |
| 9 | Huracán Buceo | 22 | 5 | 7 | 10 | 27 | 39 | −12 | 17 |
| 10 | Rentistas | 22 | 4 | 9 | 9 | 25 | 40 | −15 | 17 |
| 11 | River Plate | 22 | 3 | 10 | 9 | 15 | 29 | −14 | 16 |
| 12 | Cerro | 22 | 5 | 5 | 12 | 30 | 41 | −11 | 15 |

Source: rsssf.com
