= 1946 Campeonato Uruguayo Primera División =

43rd season of the top-tier football league in Uruguay

Uruguayan Primera División
- Season: 1946
- Champions: Nacional (19th. title)

Statistics of Primera División Uruguaya for the 1946 season.

== Overview ==
It was contested by 10 teams, and Nacional won the championship.

== League standings ==
Pos	Team	Pld	W	D	L	GF	GA	GD	Pts
1	Nacional	18	15	2	1	63	24	+39	32
2	Peñarol	18	12	4	2	53	21	+32	28
3	River Plate	18	10	1	7	28	21	+7	21
4	Defensor	18	7	4	7	40	31	+9	18
5	Central	18	5	6	7	33	39	−6	16
6	Rampla Juniors	18	6	4	8	24	37	−13	16
7	Miramar	18	4	6	8	24	44	−20	14
8	Liverpool	18	4	5	9	31	38	−7	13
9	Montevideo Wanderers	18	5	3	10	27	43	−16	13
10	Progreso	18	3	3	12	27	52	−25	9

Source: rsssf.com
