= 1942 Campeonato Uruguayo Primera División =

39th season of the top-tier football league in Uruguay

Uruguayan Primera División
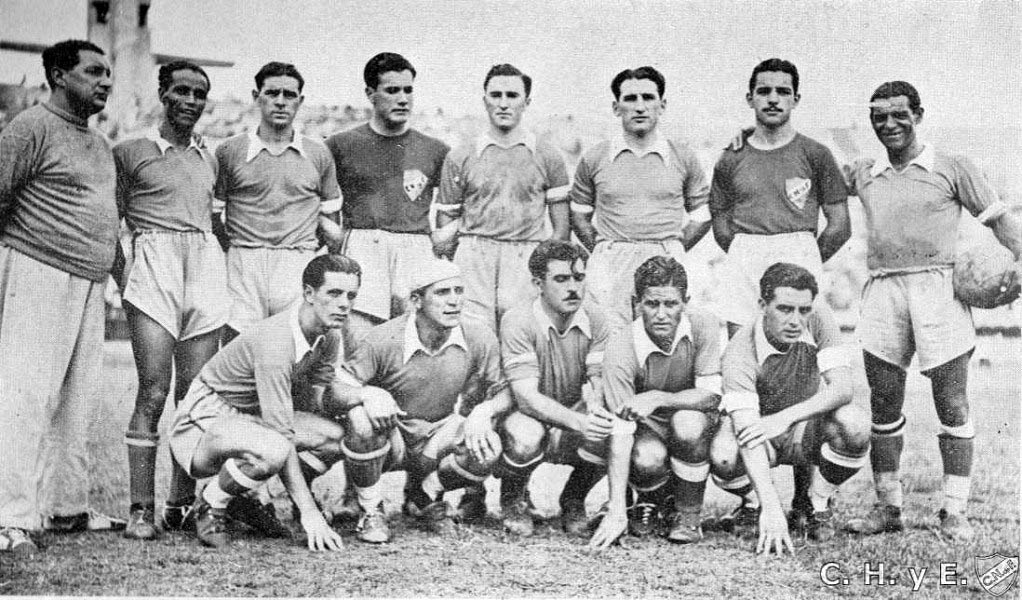
- Nacional, champions
- Season: 1942
- Champions: Nacional (17th. title)

Statistics of Primera División Uruguaya for the 1942 season.

== Overview ==
It was contested by 10 teams, and Nacional won the championship.

== League standings ==
| Pos | Team | Pld | W | D | L | GF | GA | GD | Pts |
|---|---|---|---|---|---|---|---|---|---|
| 1 | Nacional | 18 | 13 | 2 | 3 | 59 | 24 | +35 | 28 |
| 2 | Peñarol | 18 | 11 | 3 | 4 | 43 | 22 | +21 | 25 |
| 3 | Montevideo Wanderers | 18 | 8 | 6 | 4 | 24 | 21 | +3 | 22 |
| 4 | Sud América | 18 | 9 | 2 | 7 | 35 | 29 | +6 | 20 |
| 5 | Rampla Juniors | 18 | 7 | 4 | 7 | 27 | 29 | −2 | 18 |
| 6 | Liverpool | 18 | 7 | 3 | 8 | 31 | 34 | −3 | 17 |
| 7 | Racing Montevideo | 18 | 6 | 4 | 8 | 28 | 38 | −10 | 16 |
| 8 | Central | 18 | 7 | 1 | 10 | 31 | 39 | −8 | 15 |
| 9 | Defensor | 18 | 3 | 5 | 10 | 29 | 49 | −20 | 11 |
| 10 | River Plate | 18 | 2 | 4 | 12 | 17 | 39 | −22 | 8 |

Source: rsssf.com
