= 1963 Campeonato Uruguayo Primera División =

60th season of the top-tier football league in Uruguay

Statistics of Primera División Uruguaya for the 1963 season.

== Overview ==
It was contested by 10 teams, and Nacional won the championship.

== League standings ==
Pos	Team	Pld	W	D	L	GF	GA	GD	Pts
1	Nacional	18	15	1	2	40	10	+30	31
2	Peñarol	18	14	2	2	40	17	+23	30
3	Montevideo Wanderers	18	8	5	5	24	20	+4	21
4	Fénix	18	7	5	6	24	27	−3	19
5	Racing Montevideo	18	7	4	7	24	25	−1	18
6	Rampla Juniors	18	7	2	9	27	27	0	16
7	Danubio	18	7	2	9	26	37	−11	16
8	Cerro	18	4	5	9	26	32	−6	13
9	Defensor	18	3	2	13	16	31	−15	8
10	Liverpool	18	3	2	13	21	42	−21	8

Source: rsssf.com
