= 1983 Campeonato Uruguayo Primera División =

80th season of the top-tier football league in Uruguay

Statistics of Primera División Uruguaya for the 1983 season.

== Overview ==
It was contested by 13 teams, and Nacional won the championship.

== League standings ==
Pos	Team	Pld	W	D	L	GF	GA	GD	Pts
1	Nacional	24	16	6	2	46	13	+33	38
2	Danubio	24	10	9	5	37	21	+16	29
3	Defensor	24	7	15	2	42	27	+15	29
4	Bella Vista	24	10	8	6	25	20	+5	28
5	Montevideo Wanderers	24	7	11	6	28	27	+1	25
6	Progreso	24	6	12	6	27	32	−5	24
7	Peñarol	24	5	12	7	30	31	−1	22
8	Cerro	24	8	6	10	31	36	−5	22
9	Sud América	24	6	8	10	29	39	−10	20
10	Miramar Misiones	24	6	8	10	23	32	−9	20
11	Huracán Buceo	24	5	10	9	21	37	−16	20
12	Rampla Juniors	24	5	9	10	21	32	−11	19
13	River Plate	24	3	10	11	17	30	−13	16

Source: rsssf.com
