= 1955 Campeonato Uruguayo Primera División =

52nd season of the top-tier football league in Uruguay

Uruguayan Primera División
- Season: 1955
- Champions: Nacional (23th. title)
- Matches: 90
- Goals: 294 (3.27 per match)

Statistics of Primera División Uruguaya for the 1955 season.

== Overview ==
It was contested by 10 teams, and Nacional won the championship.

== League standings ==
Pos	Team	Pld	W	D	L	GF	GA	GD	Pts
1	Nacional	18	14	3	1	53	21	+32	31
2	Peñarol	18	10	7	1	36	17	+19	27
3	Cerro	18	6	6	6	30	19	+11	18
4	Danubio	18	6	6	6	37	32	+5	18
5	Defensor	18	6	5	7	29	38	−9	17
6	Rampla Juniors	18	5	6	7	28	31	−3	16
7	Montevideo Wanderers	18	5	6	7	21	24	−3	16
8	Sud América	18	6	3	9	23	41	−18	15
9	Liverpool	18	6	1	11	22	31	−9	13
10	River Plate	18	2	5	11	15	40	−25	9

Source: rsssf.com
