= 1958 Campeonato Uruguayo Primera División =

55th season of the top-tier football league in Uruguay

Uruguayan Primera División
- Season: 1958
- Champions: Peñarol (21st title)
- Matches: 90
- Goals: 271 (3.01 per match)

Statistics of Primera División Uruguaya for the 1958 season.

== Overview ==
It was contested by 10 teams, and Peñarol won the championship.

== League standings ==
Pos	Team	Pld	W	D	L	GF	GA	GD	Pts
1	Peñarol	18	10	4	4	33	16	+17	24
2	Nacional	18	8	7	3	37	15	+22	23
3	Rampla Juniors	18	10	3	5	29	18	+11	23
4	Sud América	18	7	7	4	20	16	+4	21
5	Montevideo Wanderers	18	5	8	5	26	28	−2	18
6	Liverpool	18	7	3	8	26	40	−14	17
7	Defensor	18	5	6	7	32	32	0	16
8	Cerro	18	3	8	7	20	26	−6	14
9	Danubio	18	2	9	7	24	35	−11	13
10	Fénix	18	3	5	10	24	45	−21	11

Source: rsssf.com
