= 1938 Campeonato Uruguayo Primera División =

35th season of the top-tier football league in Uruguay

Uruguayan Primera División
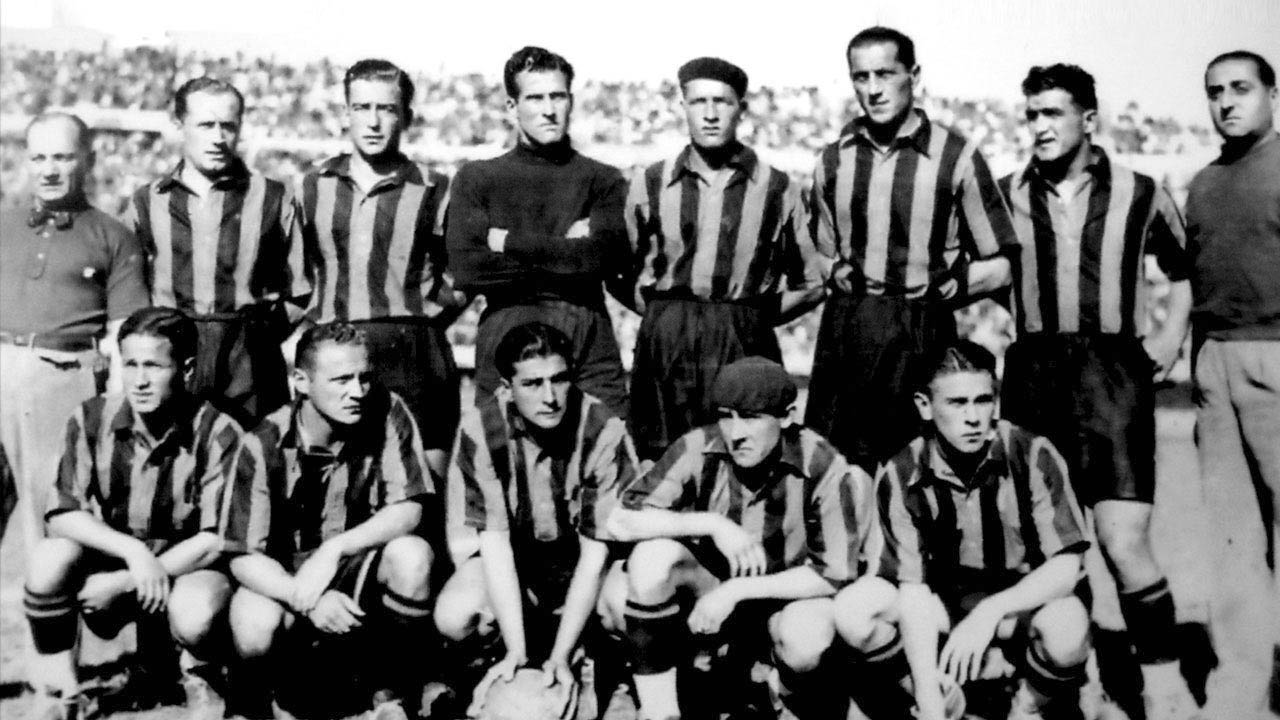
- Peñarol, champions
- Season: 1938 (35th)
- Champions: Peñarol

Statistics of Primera División Uruguaya for the 1938 season.

== Overview ==
It was contested by 11 teams, and Peñarol won the championship.

== League standings ==
Pos	Team	Pld	W	D	L	GF	GA	GD	Pts
1	Peñarol	20	16	2	2	62	24	+38	34
2	Nacional	20	14	3	3	59	20	+39	31
3	Central	20	9	7	4	36	26	+10	25
4	Montevideo Wanderers	20	9	4	7	35	27	+8	22
5	Bella Vista	20	6	8	6	24	30	−6	20
6	Defensor	20	6	7	7	37	35	+2	19
7	River Plate	20	6	7	7	27	37	−10	19
8	Racing Montevideo	20	4	8	8	23	30	−7	16
9	Sud América	20	5	4	11	32	54	−22	14
10	Rampla Juniors	20	3	7	10	28	45	−17	13
11	Liverpool	20	1	5	14	17	52	−35	7

Source: rsssf.com
