= 1949 Campeonato Uruguayo Primera División =

46th season of the top-tier football league in Uruguay

Uruguayan Primera División
- Season: 1949
- Champions: Peñarol (17th. title)

Statistics of Primera División Uruguaya for the 1949 season.

== Overview ==
It was contested by 10 teams, and Peñarol won the championship.

== League standings ==
Pos	Team	Pld	W	D	L	GF	GA	GD	Pts
1	Peñarol	18	16	2	0	62	17	+45	34
2	Nacional	18	12	4	2	48	28	+20	28
3	Rampla Juniors	18	6	11	1	27	18	+9	23
4	River Plate	18	10	1	7	36	35	+1	21
5	Cerro	18	7	3	8	31	35	−4	17
6	Danubio	18	4	7	7	27	32	−5	15
7	Montevideo Wanderers	18	4	5	9	25	38	−13	13
8	Liverpool	18	3	7	8	19	29	−10	13
9	Central	18	3	4	11	20	42	−22	10
10	Defensor	18	1	4	13	28	49	−21	6

Source: rsssf.com
