= 1966 Campeonato Uruguayo Primera División =

63rd season of the top-tier football league in Uruguay

Statistics of Primera División Uruguaya for the 1966 season.

== Overview ==
It was contested by 10 teams, and Nacional won the championship.

== League standings ==
Pos	Team	Pld	W	D	L	GF	GA	GD	Pts
1	Nacional	18	11	6	1	28	6	+22	28
2	Peñarol	18	10	6	2	31	11	+20	26
3	Cerro	18	9	5	4	31	15	+16	23
4	Rampla Juniors	18	9	4	5	26	18	+8	22
5	Danubio	18	8	6	4	24	15	+9	22
6	Sud América	18	4	6	8	15	30	−15	14
7	Montevideo Wanderers	18	5	3	10	18	29	−11	13
8	Defensor	18	3	6	9	9	24	−15	12
9	Fénix	18	3	4	11	15	30	−15	10
10	Racing Montevideo	18	4	2	12	23	42	−19	10

Source: rsssf.com
