= 1934 Campeonato Uruguayo Primera División =

31st season of the top-tier football league in Uruguay

Uruguayan Primera División
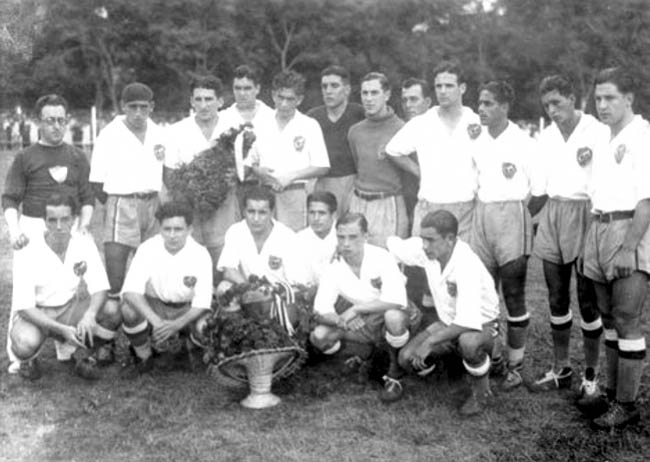
- Nacional, champions
- Season: 1934 (31th)
- Champions: Nacional

Statistics of Primera División Uruguaya for the 1934 season.

== Overview ==
It was contested by 10 teams, and Nacional won the championship.

== League standings ==
Pos	Team	Pld	W	D	L	GF	GA	GD	Pts
1	Nacional	27	17	7	3	51	17	+34	41
2	Peñarol	27	15	8	4	51	31	+20	38
3	Montevideo Wanderers	27	15	5	7	47	28	+19	35
4	Rampla Juniors	27	10	8	9	42	37	+5	28
5	Defensor	27	11	3	13	41	44	−3	25
6	River Plate	27	8	9	10	30	36	−6	25
7	Central	27	5	14	8	32	40	−8	24
8	Racing Montevideo	27	5	11	11	29	43	−14	21
9	Sud América	27	6	7	14	30	46	−16	19
10	Bella Vista	27	3	8	16	22	53	−31	14

Source: rsssf.com
