= 1921 Campeonato Uruguayo Primera División =

21st season of the top-tier football league in Uruguay

Uruguayan Primera División
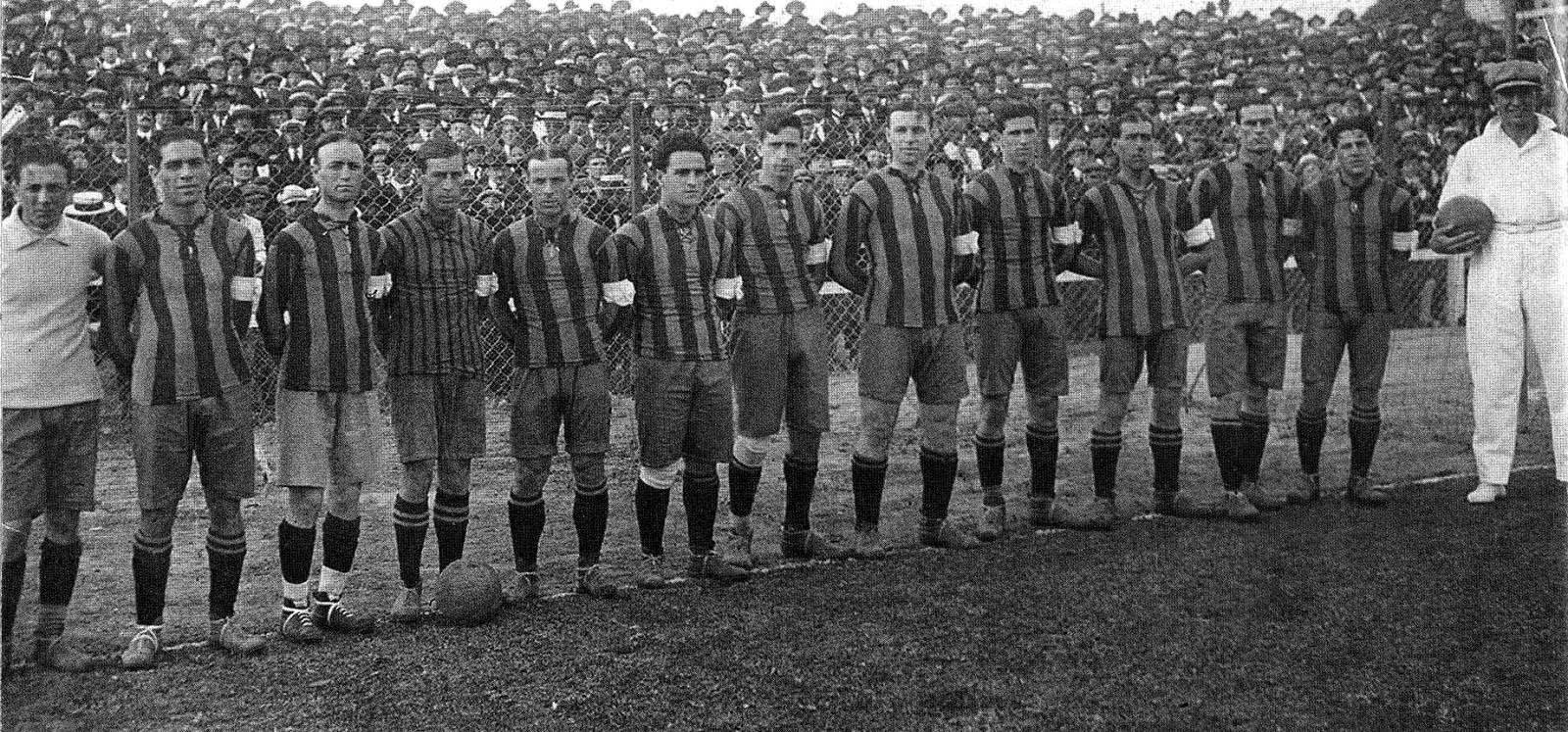
- Peñarol, champions
- Season: 1921 (21st)
- Champions: Peñarol
- Relegated: Reformers
- Matches: 132
- Goals: 300 (2.27 per match)

The Uruguayan Championship 1921 was the 21st season of Uruguay's top-flight football league.

== Overview ==
The tournament consisted of a two-wheel championship of all against all. It involved twelve teams, and the champion was Peñarol.

== Teams ==
Team	City	Stadium	Capacity	Foundation	Seasons	Consecutive seasons	Titles	1920
Belgrano	Montevideo				2	2	-	9th
Central	Montevideo			5 January 1905	12	12	-	3rd
Charley	Montevideo				4	4	-	11th
Dublin	Montevideo				10	5	-	10th
Lito	Montevideo			1917	-	-	-	-
Liverpool	Montevideo			15 February 1915	1	1	-	8th
Nacional	Montevideo	Gran Parque Central	15,000	14 May 1899	19	19	8	1st
Peñarol	Montevideo			28 September 1891	20	20	6	2nd
Reformers	Montevideo				8	8	-	6th
Universal	Montevideo				9	9	-	4th
Uruguay Onward	Montevideo				1	1	-	7th
Montevideo Wanderers	Montevideo			15 August 1902	17	17	2	5th

== League standings ==
Pos	Team	Pld	W	D	L	GF	GA	GD	Pts
1	Peñarol	22	18	3	1	56	12	+44	39
2	Nacional	22	16	5	1	52	10	+42	37
3	Universal	22	13	5	4	37	14	+23	31
4	Montevideo Wanderers	22	13	4	5	26	11	+15	30
5	Belgrano	22	8	6	8	24	27	−3	22
6	Lito	22	8	5	9	25	28	−3	21
7	Liverpool	22	7	2	13	18	18	0	16
8	Central	22	5	5	12	14	25	−11	15
9	Charley	22	5	4	13	13	32	−19	14
10	Uruguay Onward	22	6	2	14	12	42	−30	14
11	Dublin	22	5	3	14	11	41	−30	13
12	Reformers	22	4	4	14	12	40	−28	12

Source: rsssf.com

Uruguayan Champion 1921
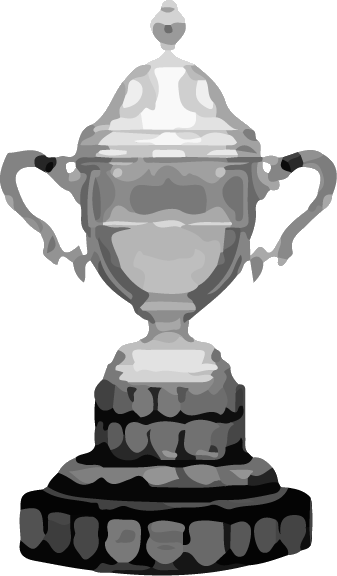
Peñarol
2nd title
