= 1982 Campeonato Uruguayo Primera División =

79th season of the top-tier football league in Uruguay

Uruguayan Primera División
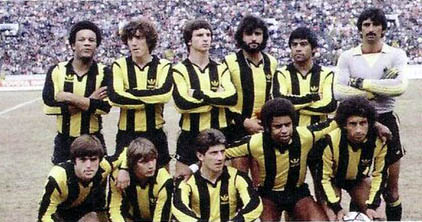
- Peñarol, champions
- Season: 1982
- Champions: Peñarol (36th. title)

Statistics of Primera División Uruguaya for the 1982 season.

== Overview ==
It was contested by 14 teams, and Peñarol won the championship.

== League standings ==
| Pos | Team | Pld | W | D | L | GF | GA | GD | Pts |
|---|---|---|---|---|---|---|---|---|---|
| 1 | Peñarol | 26 | 15 | 9 | 2 | 47 | 22 | +25 | 39 |
| 2 | Nacional | 26 | 14 | 6 | 6 | 44 | 24 | +20 | 34 |
| 3 | Defensor | 26 | 13 | 8 | 5 | 49 | 35 | +14 | 34 |
| 4 | Bella Vista | 26 | 9 | 11 | 6 | 35 | 26 | +9 | 29 |
| 5 | Montevideo Wanderers | 26 | 8 | 12 | 6 | 31 | 30 | +1 | 28 |
| 6 | Sud América | 26 | 9 | 9 | 8 | 29 | 29 | 0 | 27 |
| 7 | Danubio | 26 | 7 | 12 | 7 | 31 | 29 | +2 | 26 |
| 8 | Progreso | 26 | 9 | 6 | 11 | 27 | 29 | −2 | 24 |
| 9 | Rampla Juniors | 26 | 8 | 8 | 10 | 35 | 43 | −8 | 24 |
| 10 | Cerro | 26 | 6 | 10 | 10 | 25 | 31 | −6 | 22 |
| 11 | Liverpool | 26 | 7 | 8 | 11 | 16 | 24 | −8 | 22 |
| 12 | Miramar Misiones | 26 | 6 | 8 | 12 | 29 | 40 | −11 | 20 |
| 13 | River Plate | 26 | 6 | 7 | 13 | 35 | 52 | −17 | 19 |
| 14 | Huracán Buceo | 26 | 5 | 6 | 15 | 21 | 40 | −19 | 16 |

Source: rsssf.com
