= 1950 Campeonato Uruguayo Primera División =

47th season of the top-tier football league in Uruguay

Uruguayan Primera División
- Season: 1950
- Champions: Nacional (21st. title)

Statistics of Primera División Uruguaya for the 1950 season.

== Overview ==
It was contested by 10 teams, and Nacional won the championship.

== League standings ==
Pos	Team	Pld	W	D	L	GF	GA	GD	Pts
1	Nacional	18	14	2	2	52	18	+34	30
2	Peñarol	18	12	4	2	39	21	+18	28
3	Rampla Juniors	18	10	2	6	35	26	+9	22
4	Central	18	8	5	5	37	28	+9	21
5	Cerro	18	9	0	9	37	38	−1	18
6	Danubio	18	5	5	8	25	33	−8	15
7	Liverpool	18	6	3	9	28	41	−13	15
8	River Plate	18	4	5	9	24	36	−12	13
9	Montevideo Wanderers	18	2	5	11	25	40	−15	9
10	Bella Vista	18	3	3	12	20	41	−21	9

Source: rsssf.com
