= 1973 Campeonato Uruguayo Primera División =

70th season of the top-tier football league in Uruguay

Statistics of Primera División Uruguaya for the 1973 season.

== Overview ==
It was contested by 12 teams, and Peñarol won the championship.

== League standings ==
Pos	Team	Pld	W	D	L	GF	GA	GD	Pts
1	Peñarol	22	14	7	1	38	16	+22	35
2	Nacional	22	9	11	2	29	19	+10	29
3	Danubio	22	10	8	4	26	15	+11	28
4	Defensor	22	10	5	7	33	28	+5	25
5	Rentistas	22	7	10	5	21	18	+3	24
6	Liverpool	22	8	7	7	28	21	+7	23
7	Cerro	22	8	7	7	24	24	0	23
8	Montevideo Wanderers	22	4	13	5	16	15	+1	21
9	River Plate	22	5	11	6	17	20	−3	21
10	Huracán Buceo	22	3	10	9	22	29	−7	16
11	Central Español	22	6	2	14	18	38	−20	14
12	Bella Vista	22	1	3	18	10	39	−29	5

Source: rsssf.com
