= 1939 Campeonato Uruguayo Primera División =

36th season of the top-tier football league in Uruguay

Uruguayan Primera División
- Season: 1939
- Champions: Nacional (14th. title)

Statistics of Primera División Uruguaya for the 1939 season.

== Overview ==
It was contested by 11 teams, and Nacional won the championship.

== League standings ==
Pos	Team	Pld	W	D	L	GF	GA	GD	Pts
1	Nacional	20	13	2	5	60	17	+43	28
2	Peñarol	20	13	2	5	56	25	+31	28
3	Montevideo Wanderers	20	7	8	5	33	28	+5	22
4	Liverpool	20	8	3	9	29	31	−2	19
5	River Plate	20	6	7	7	25	30	−5	19
6	Defensor	20	6	7	7	29	44	−15	19
7	Racing Montevideo	20	6	7	7	28	45	−17	19
8	Central	20	6	6	8	23	42	−19	18
9	Rampla Juniors	20	6	5	9	36	42	−6	17
10	Sud América	20	5	6	9	36	37	−1	16
11	Bella Vista	20	5	5	10	27	41	−14	15

Source: rsssf.com
- Playoff: Nacional-Peñarol 3-2
