= 1901 Campeonato Uruguayo Primera División =

2nd season of the top-tier football league in Uruguay

Primera División
- Season: 1901 (2nd)
- Champions: CURCC (2º title)
- Matches: 20
- Goals: 64 (3.2 per match)
- Top goalscorer: Juan Pena (6) CURCC

The 1901 Primera División was the second official championship of the Uruguayan football history.

== Overview ==
The tournament consisted of a round-robin championship of all against all. It involved five teams, after allowing the entry of Club Nacional de Football to the competition. The champion was Central Uruguay Railway Cricket Club (CURCC).

== Teams ==
Team	City	Stadium	Capacity	Foundation	Seasons	Consecutive seasons	Titles	1900
Albion	Montevideo			1 June 1891	1	1	-	2nd
CURCC	Montevideo			28 September 1891	1	1	1	1st
Deutscher	Montevideo			1896	1	1	-	4th
Nacional	Montevideo	Gran Parque Central	7,000	14 May 1899	-	-	-	-
Uruguay Athletic	Montevideo			10 August 1898	1	1	-	3rd

== League standings ==
Pos	Team	Pld	W	D	L	GF	GA	GD	Pts
1	CURCC	8	7	1	0	30	4	+26	15
2	Nacional	8	5	2	1	15	8	+7	12
3	Uruguay Athletic	8	3	1	4	11	16	−5	7
4	Deutscher	8	1	1	6	5	19	−14	3
5	Albion	8	1	1	6	3	17	−14	3

Source: rsssf.com

1901 Primera División Champion

2nd title
