= 1957 Campeonato Uruguayo Primera División =

54th season of the top-tier football league in Uruguay

Uruguayan Primera División
- Season: 1957
- Champions: Nacional (25th. title)
- Matches: 90
- Goals: 293 (3.26 per match)

Statistics of Primera División Uruguaya in the 1957 season.

== Overview ==
It was contested by 10 teams, and Nacional won the championship.

== League standings ==
Pos	Team	Pld	W	D	L	GF	GA	GD	Pts
1	Nacional	18	9	6	3	30	14	+16	24
2	Peñarol	18	9	3	6	39	34	+5	21
3	Defensor	18	8	4	6	41	33	+8	20
4	Fénix	18	8	3	7	31	33	−2	19
5	Cerro	18	7	3	8	35	40	−5	17
6	Danubio	18	5	6	7	22	22	0	16
7	Montevideo Wanderers	18	5	6	7	23	24	−1	16
8	Liverpool	18	7	2	9	25	29	−4	16
9	Rampla Juniors	18	5	6	7	26	32	−6	16
10	Racing Montevideo	18	5	5	8	21	32	−11	15

Source: rsssf.com
