= 1940 Campeonato Uruguayo Primera División =

37th season of the top-tier football league in Uruguay

Uruguayan Primera División
- Season: 1940
- Champions: Nacional (15th. title)

Statistics of Primera División Uruguaya for the 1940 season.

== Overview ==
It was contested by 11 teams, and Nacional won the championship.

== League standings ==
Pos	Team	Pld	W	D	L	GF	GA	GD	Pts
1	Nacional	20	16	3	1	63	22	+41	35
2	Rampla Juniors	20	11	3	6	41	29	+12	25
3	Montevideo Wanderers	20	10	4	6	47	22	+25	24
4	Peñarol	20	10	2	8	54	38	+16	22
5	Liverpool	20	8	3	9	39	39	0	19
6	River Plate	20	7	5	8	35	39	−4	19
7	Defensor	20	5	9	6	32	49	−17	19
8	Sud América	20	6	5	9	31	37	−6	17
9	Racing Montevideo	20	7	3	10	31	46	−15	17
10	Central	20	3	9	8	26	35	−9	15
11	Bella Vista	20	1	6	13	22	65	−43	8

Source: rsssf.com
