= 1976 Campeonato Uruguayo Primera División =

73rd season of the top-tier football league in Uruguay

Statistics of Primera División Uruguaya for the 1976 season.

== Overview ==
It was contested by 12 teams, and Defensor won the championship.

== League standings ==
Pos	Team	Pld	W	D	L	GF	GA	GD	Pts
1	Defensor	22	13	6	3	33	24	+9	32
2	Peñarol	22	13	5	4	38	23	+15	31
3	Nacional	22	12	4	6	43	30	+13	28
4	Danubio	22	8	7	7	28	26	+2	23
5	Huracán Buceo	22	7	8	7	35	36	−1	22
6	Montevideo Wanderers	22	7	7	8	29	30	−1	21
7	River Plate	22	4	11	7	26	31	−5	19
8	Cerro	22	6	7	9	21	29	−8	19
9	Fénix	22	5	8	9	31	35	−4	18
10	Rentistas	22	5	8	9	30	37	−7	18
11	Sud América	22	5	8	9	21	29	−8	18
12	Liverpool	22	5	5	12	25	30	−5	15

Source: rsssf.com
