= 1951 Campeonato Uruguayo Primera División =

48th season of the top-tier football league in Uruguay

Uruguayan Primera División
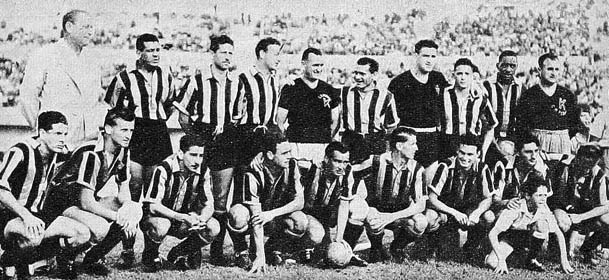
- Peñarol, champions
- Season: 1951
- Champions: Peñarol (18th. title)

Statistics of Primera División Uruguaya for the 1951 season.

== Overview ==
It was contested by 10 teams, and Peñarol won the championship.

== League standings ==
Pos	Team	Pld	W	D	L	GF	GA	GD	Pts
1	Peñarol	18	13	3	2	50	14	+36	29
2	Nacional	18	12	3	3	50	21	+29	27
3	Rampla Juniors	18	8	6	4	40	28	+12	22
4	Central	18	6	6	6	23	29	−6	18
5	Cerro	18	7	3	8	26	38	−12	17
6	Danubio	18	6	4	8	30	36	−6	16
7	River Plate	18	6	4	8	31	41	−10	16
8	Defensor	18	4	4	10	25	36	−11	12
9	Liverpool	18	3	6	9	20	37	−17	12
10	Montevideo Wanderers	18	4	3	11	24	39	−15	11

Source: rsssf.com
