= 1937 Campeonato Uruguayo Primera División =

34th season of the top-tier football league in Uruguay

Uruguayan Primera División
- Season: 1937 (34th)
- Champions: Peñarol

Statistics of Primera División Uruguaya for the 1937 season.

== Overview ==
It was contested by 10 teams, and Peñarol won the championship.

== League standings ==
Pos	Team	Pld	W	D	L	GF	GA	GD	Pts
1	Peñarol	18	14	1	3	53	18	+35	29
2	Nacional	18	11	6	1	35	19	+16	28
3	Montevideo Wanderers	18	9	3	6	33	22	+11	21
4	River Plate	18	8	4	6	36	35	+1	20
5	Rampla Juniors	18	6	6	6	34	32	+2	18
6	Central	18	5	4	9	29	37	−8	14
7	Racing Montevideo	18	5	4	9	25	38	−13	14
8	Bella Vista	18	4	5	9	29	36	−7	13
9	Sud América	18	4	5	9	24	37	−13	13
10	Defensor	18	4	2	12	30	54	−24	10

Source: rsssf.com
