= 1978 Campeonato Uruguayo Primera División =

75th season of the top-tier football league in Uruguay

Statistics of Primera División Uruguaya for the 1978 season.

== Overview ==
It was contested by 12 teams, and Peñarol won the championship.

== League standings ==
Pos	Team	Pld	W	D	L	GF	GA	GD	Pts
1	Peñarol	22	17	5	0	70	22	+48	39
2	Nacional	22	16	4	2	50	20	+30	36
3	Fénix	22	9	6	7	34	31	+3	24
4	Defensor	22	7	7	8	28	34	−6	21
5	Montevideo Wanderers	22	8	4	10	29	25	+4	20
6	Danubio	22	6	8	8	29	38	−9	20
7	Sud América	22	6	7	9	24	29	−5	19
8	Cerro	22	6	7	9	24	35	−11	19
9	Rentistas	22	6	6	10	27	33	−6	18
10	Huracán Buceo	22	5	8	9	24	40	−16	18
11	Bella Vista	22	3	11	8	23	34	−11	17
12	Liverpool	22	3	7	12	20	41	−21	13

Source: rsssf.com
