= 1977 Campeonato Uruguayo Primera División =

74th season of the top-tier football league in Uruguay

Statistics of Primera División Uruguaya for the 1977 season.

== Overview ==
It was contested by 12 teams, and Nacional won the championship.

== League standings ==
| Pos | Team | Pld | W | D | L | GF | GA | GD | Pts |
|---|---|---|---|---|---|---|---|---|---|
| 1 | Nacional | 22 | 16 | 4 | 2 | 54 | 19 | +35 | 36 |
| 2 | Peñarol | 22 | 14 | 7 | 1 | 47 | 19 | +28 | 35 |
| 3 | Defensor | 22 | 11 | 8 | 3 | 31 | 19 | +12 | 30 |
| 4 | Danubio | 22 | 8 | 9 | 5 | 28 | 22 | +6 | 25 |
| 5 | Rentistas | 22 | 6 | 9 | 7 | 26 | 27 | −1 | 21 |
| 6 | Bella Vista | 22 | 5 | 10 | 7 | 27 | 27 | 0 | 20 |
| 7 | Montevideo Wanderers | 22 | 6 | 8 | 8 | 24 | 30 | −6 | 20 |
| 8 | Liverpool | 22 | 5 | 9 | 8 | 21 | 27 | −6 | 19 |
| 9 | Sud América | 22 | 6 | 5 | 11 | 19 | 32 | −13 | 17 |
| 10 | Cerro | 22 | 5 | 5 | 12 | 23 | 40 | −17 | 15 |
| 11 | River Plate | 22 | 5 | 4 | 13 | 17 | 34 | −17 | 14 |
| 12 | Huracán Buceo | 22 | 2 | 8 | 12 | 18 | 39 | −21 | 12 |

Source: rsssf.com
