= 1979 Campeonato Uruguayo Primera División =

76th season of the top-tier football league in Uruguay

Statistics of Primera División Uruguaya for the 1979 season.

== Overview ==
It was contested by 13 teams, and Peñarol won the championship.

== League standings ==
Pos	Team	Pld	W	D	L	GF	GA	GD	Pts
1	Peñarol	24	19	3	2	47	12	+35	41
2	Nacional	24	17	4	3	53	18	+35	38
3	Fénix	24	10	7	7	23	18	+5	27
4	Defensor	24	9	8	7	30	26	+4	26
5	River Plate	24	8	9	7	25	30	−5	25
6	Huracán Buceo	24	8	6	10	23	23	0	22
7	Montevideo Wanderers	24	7	8	9	26	28	−2	22
8	Bella Vista	24	6	9	9	33	37	−4	21
9	Sud América	24	7	6	11	28	39	−11	20
10	Cerro	24	6	7	11	24	35	−11	19
11	Danubio	24	4	9	11	20	28	−8	17
12	Liverpool	24	5	7	12	19	37	−18	17
13	Rentistas	24	3	11	10	16	36	−20	17

Source: rsssf.com
