= 1990 Campeonato Uruguayo Primera División =

87th season of the top-tier football league in Uruguay

Statistics of Primera División Uruguaya for the 1990 season. It was contested by 14 teams, and Bella Vista won the championship.

== League standings ==
Pos	Team	Pld	W	D	L	GF	GA	GD	Pts
1	Bella Vista	26	16	7	3	34	15	+19	39
2	Nacional	26	11	10	5	27	16	+11	32
3	Peñarol	26	12	7	7	37	21	+16	31
4	Central Español	26	12	5	9	30	25	+5	29
5	Racing Montevideo	26	9	11	6	25	21	+4	29
6	Danubio	26	10	9	7	24	21	+3	29
7	Liverpool	26	10	9	7	29	27	+2	29
8	Defensor Sporting	26	7	13	6	20	20	0	27
9	Rentistas	26	5	14	7	25	24	+1	24
10	Montevideo Wanderers	26	8	7	11	25	24	+1	23
11	Progreso	26	8	6	12	19	29	−10	22
12	Cerro	26	5	11	10	23	32	−9	21
13	River Plate	26	6	7	13	19	33	−14	19
14	Huracán Buceo	26	3	4	19	12	41	−29	10

Source: rsssf.com
