= 1988 Campeonato Uruguayo Primera División =

85th season of the top-tier football league in Uruguay

The 1988 Uruguayan Primera División was the 84th season of the top tier in Uruguayan football.

It was contested by 13 teams in a round-robin format. Danubio won the league title for the first time in its history. Danubio's Rubén da Silva was the top scorer, with 23 goals.

== League standings ==
| Pos | Team | Pld | W | D | L | GF | GA | GD | Pts |
|---|---|---|---|---|---|---|---|---|---|
| 1 | Danubio | 24 | 18 | 4 | 2 | 52 | 18 | +34 | 40 |
| 2 | Peñarol | 24 | 13 | 5 | 6 | 51 | 30 | +21 | 31 |
| 3 | Defensor | 24 | 12 | 7 | 5 | 33 | 17 | +16 | 31 |
| 4 | Huracán Buceo | 24 | 11 | 6 | 7 | 25 | 25 | 0 | 28 |
| 5 | Liverpool | 24 | 10 | 5 | 9 | 20 | 21 | −1 | 25 |
| 6 | Montevideo Wanderers | 24 | 6 | 12 | 6 | 25 | 26 | −1 | 24 |
| 7 | Nacional | 24 | 8 | 6 | 10 | 26 | 32 | −6 | 22 |
| 8 | Cerro | 24 | 9 | 3 | 12 | 21 | 29 | −8 | 21 |
| 9 | Central Español | 24 | 7 | 7 | 10 | 19 | 27 | −8 | 21 |
| 10 | River Plate | 24 | 5 | 10 | 9 | 26 | 27 | −1 | 20 |
| 11 | Bella Vista | 24 | 5 | 8 | 11 | 20 | 33 | −13 | 18 |
| 12 | Miramar Misiones | 24 | 4 | 10 | 10 | 24 | 38 | −14 | 18 |
| 13 | Progreso | 24 | 4 | 5 | 15 | 20 | 39 | −19 | 13 |

Source: RSSSF
