= 1944 Campeonato Uruguayo Primera División =

41st season of the top-tier football league in Uruguay

Uruguayan Primera División
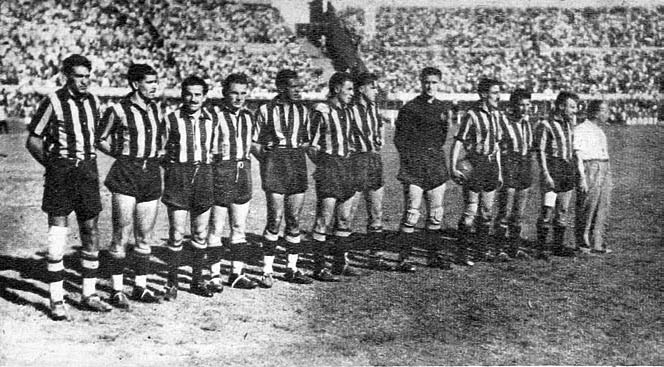
- Peñarol, champions
- Season: 1944
- Champions: Peñarol (15th. title)

Statistics of Primera División Uruguaya for the 1944 season.

== Overview ==
It was contested by 10 teams, and Peñarol won the championship.

== League standings ==
Pos	Team	Pld	W	D	L	GF	GA	GD	Pts
1	Peñarol	18	12	3	3	41	21	+20	27
2	Nacional	18	12	3	3	48	21	+27	27
3	Defensor	18	10	5	3	43	27	+16	25
4	Montevideo Wanderers	18	7	5	6	32	31	+1	19
5	Central	18	7	3	8	35	34	+1	17
6	Sud América	18	5	4	9	24	37	−13	14
7	Liverpool	18	5	3	10	22	30	−8	13
8	River Plate	18	6	1	11	29	43	−14	13
9	Miramar	18	4	5	9	23	37	−14	13
10	Racing Montevideo	18	5	2	11	27	43	−16	12

Source: rsssf.com
