= 1947 Campeonato Uruguayo Primera División =

Uruguayan Primera División
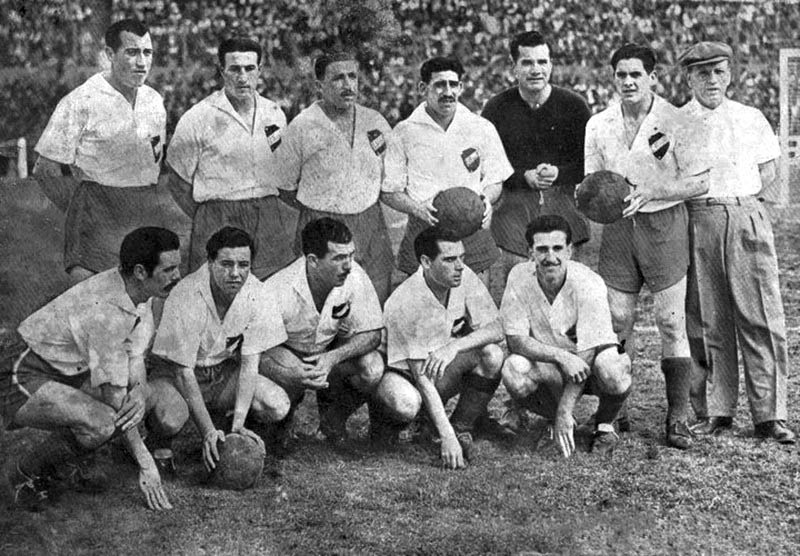
- Nacional, champions
- Season: 1947
- Champions: Nacional (20th. title)

Statistics of Primera División Uruguaya for the 1947 season.

== Overview ==
It was contested by 10 teams, and Nacional won the championship.

== League standings ==
Pos	Team	Pld	W	D	L	GF	GA	GD	Pts
1	Nacional	18	11	5	2	44	15	+29	27
2	Peñarol	18	9	3	6	41	26	+15	21
3	Rampla Juniors	18	9	3	6	35	27	+8	21
4	Defensor	18	9	3	6	33	28	+5	21
5	River Plate	18	6	8	4	25	19	+6	20
6	Liverpool	18	9	2	7	33	35	−2	20
7	Central	18	6	2	10	36	44	−8	14
8	Cerro	18	5	4	9	28	42	−14	14
9	Montevideo Wanderers	18	4	5	9	24	36	−12	13
10	Miramar	18	2	5	11	19	46	−27	9

Source: rsssf.com
