= 1984 Campeonato Uruguayo Primera División =

81st season of the top-tier football league in Uruguay

Statistics of Primera División Uruguaya for the 1984 season.

== Overview ==
It was contested by 13 teams, and Central Español won the championship.

== League standings ==
Pos	Team	Pld	W	D	L	GF	GA	GD	Pts
1	Central Español	24	13	9	2	39	17	+22	35
2	Peñarol	24	11	12	1	47	23	+24	34
3	Nacional	24	11	10	3	44	25	+19	32
4	Danubio	24	12	7	5	35	22	+13	31
5	Bella Vista	24	10	7	7	25	29	−4	27
6	Montevideo Wanderers	24	10	6	8	37	30	+7	26
7	Defensor	24	9	6	9	27	26	+1	24
8	Rampla Juniors	24	6	12	6	28	28	0	24
9	Progreso	24	4	10	10	23	35	−12	18
10	Huracán Buceo	24	4	10	10	15	29	−14	18
11	Sud América	24	5	7	12	27	42	−15	17
12	Cerro	24	2	11	11	15	38	−23	15
13	Miramar Misiones	24	3	5	16	16	34	−18	11

Source: rsssf.com
