= 1985 Campeonato Uruguayo Primera División =

82nd season of the top-tier football league in Uruguay

Statistics of Primera División Uruguaya for the 1985 season.

== Overview ==
It was contested by 13 teams, and Peñarol won the championship.

== League standings ==
Pos	Team	Pld	W	D	L	GF	GA	GD	Pts
1	Peñarol	24	12	8	4	35	16	+19	32
2	Montevideo Wanderers	24	9	10	5	26	16	+10	28
3	Cerro	24	8	11	5	28	26	+2	27
4	River Plate	24	8	11	5	25	24	+1	27
5	Nacional	24	9	8	7	26	24	+2	26
6	Progreso	24	7	11	6	24	23	+1	25
7	Rampla Juniors	24	8	8	8	21	24	−3	24
8	Central Español	24	6	11	7	24	26	−2	23
9	Sud América	24	9	4	11	31	34	−3	22
10	Huracán Buceo	24	6	10	8	24	27	−3	22
11	Danubio	24	8	5	11	36	33	+3	21
12	Defensor	24	5	8	11	18	32	−14	18
13	Bella Vista	24	5	7	12	19	32	−13	17

Source: rsssf.com
