= 1935 Campeonato Uruguayo Primera División =

32nd season of the top-tier football league in Uruguay

Uruguayan Primera División
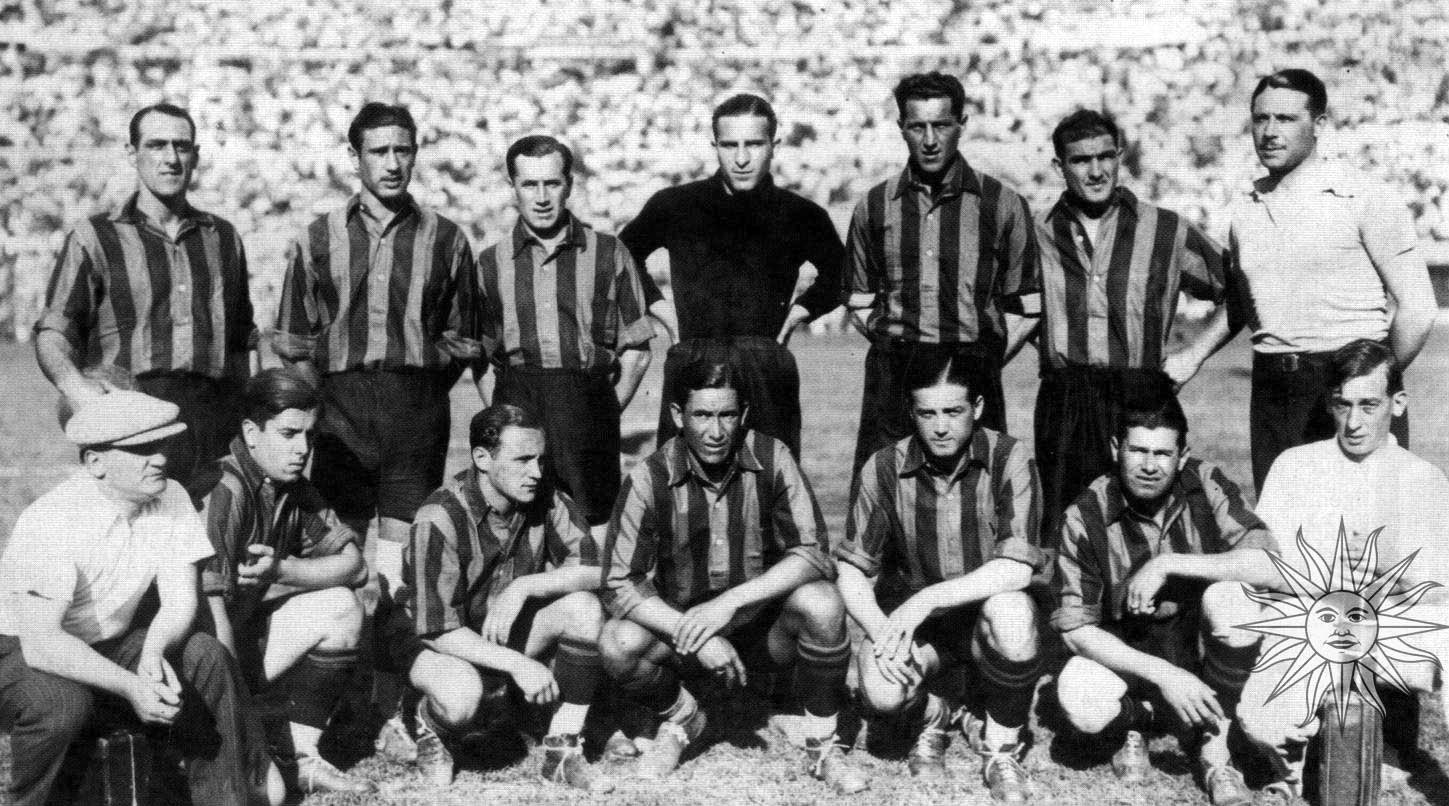
- Peñarol, champions
- Season: 1934 (32nd)
- Champions: Peñarol

Statistics of Primera División Uruguaya for the 1935 season.

== Overview ==
It was contested by 10 teams, and Peñarol won the championship.

== League standings ==
Pos	Team	Pld	W	D	L	GF	GA	GD	Pts
1	Peñarol	18	15	1	2	36	9	+27	31
2	Nacional	18	14	1	3	36	11	+25	29
3	Montevideo Wanderers	18	10	5	3	30	20	+10	25
4	Rampla Juniors	18	8	2	8	32	25	+7	18
5	Defensor	18	8	2	8	31	29	+2	18
6	River Plate	18	7	3	8	30	34	−4	17
7	Sud América	18	6	5	7	19	28	−9	17
8	Central	18	4	4	10	17	29	−12	12
9	Racing Montevideo	18	3	2	13	21	34	−13	8
10	Bella Vista	18	2	1	15	22	55	−33	5

Source: rsssf.com
