= 1961 Campeonato Uruguayo Primera División =

58th season of the top-tier football league in Uruguay

Uruguayan Primera División
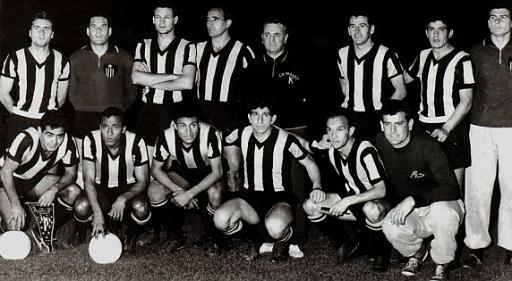
- Peñarol, champions
- Season: 1961
- Champions: Peñarol (24th. title)

Statistics of Primera División Uruguaya for the 1961 season.

== Overview ==
It was contested by 10 teams, and Peñarol won the championship.

== League standings ==
Pos	Team	Pld	W	D	L	GF	GA	GD	Pts
1	Peñarol	18	13	4	1	51	22	+29	30
2	Nacional	18	13	1	4	39	16	+23	27
3	Defensor	18	9	5	4	35	27	+8	23
4	Danubio	18	6	5	7	25	31	−6	17
5	Cerro	18	3	10	5	24	26	−2	16
6	Racing Montevideo	18	5	5	8	30	45	−15	15
7	Rampla Juniors	18	6	3	9	25	28	−3	15
8	Liverpool	18	3	8	7	23	30	−7	14
9	Montevideo Wanderers	18	3	6	9	23	35	−12	12
10	Fénix	18	3	5	10	26	41	−15	11

Source: rsssf.com
