= 1959 Campeonato Uruguayo Primera División =

56th season of the top-tier football league in Uruguay

Uruguayan Primera División
- Season: 1959
- Champions: Peñarol (22nd title)

Statistics of Primera División Uruguaya for the 1959 season.

== Overview ==
It was contested by 10 teams, and Peñarol won the championship.

== League standings ==
Pos	Team	Pld	W	D	L	GF	GA	GD	Pts
1	Peñarol	18	12	2	4	35	20	+15	26
2	Nacional	18	11	4	3	33	14	+19	26
3	Racing Montevideo	18	10	2	6	29	25	+4	22
4	Cerro	18	8	3	7	31	32	−1	19
5	Montevideo Wanderers	18	8	2	8	32	39	−7	18
6	Defensor	18	6	4	8	34	35	−1	16
7	Rampla Juniors	18	5	5	8	26	26	0	15
8	Sud América	18	6	2	10	22	30	−8	14
9	Liverpool	18	6	2	10	24	32	−8	14
10	Danubio	18	3	4	11	19	32	−13	10

Source: rsssf.com
