= 1931 Campeonato Uruguayo Primera División =

28th season of the top-tier football league in Uruguay

Uruguayan Primera División
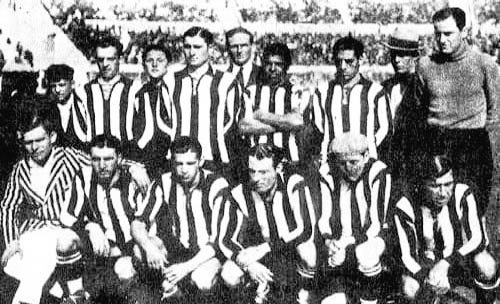
- Montevideo Wanderers, champions
- Season: 1931 (28th)
- Champions: Montevideo Wanderers

The Uruguayan Championship 1931 was the 28th official championship of Uruguayan football history. Montevideo Wanderers won their 3rd title and as of 2022 this is their last title.

== Overview ==
The tournament consisted of a two-wheel championship of all against all. It involved eleven teams, and the champion was the Montevideo Wanderers.

== Teams ==
Team	City	Stadium	Capacity	Foundation	Seasons	Consecutive seasons	Titles	1929
Bella Vista	Montevideo	Parque Bella Vista	?	4 October 1920	5	5	-	9th
Capurro	Montevideo			31 October 1914	3	3	-	7th
Central	Montevideo			5 January 1905	16	1	-	11th
Defensor	Montevideo			15 March 1913	6	3	-	3rd
Misiones	Montevideo			26 May 1906	4	3	-	8th
Nacional	Montevideo	Gran Parque Central	15,000	14 May 1899	26	26	11	2nd
Olimpia	Montevideo	Olimpia Park	?	13 March 1922	3	3	-	5th
Peñarol	Montevideo			28 September 1891	25	3	9	1st
Racing	Montevideo			6 April 1919	3	-	-	-
Rampla Juniors	Montevideo	Parque Nelson	?	7 January 1914	6	6	1	4th
Sud América	Montevideo			15 February 1914	3	3	-	10th
Montevideo Wanderers	Montevideo	Estadio Belvedere	?	15 August 1902	24	24	2	6th

== League standings ==
Pos	Team	Pld	W	D	L	GF	GA	GD	Pts
1	Montevideo Wanderers	22	17	5	0	45	10	+35	39
2	Nacional	22	15	6	1	49	13	+36	36
3	Rampla Juniors	22	14	3	5	36	23	+13	31
4	Peñarol	22	9	8	5	29	15	+14	26
5	Central	22	7	9	6	28	24	+4	23
6	Misiones	22	9	4	9	27	37	−10	22
7	Defensor	22	8	4	10	33	29	+4	20
8	Sud América	22	5	9	8	19	20	−1	19
9	Bella Vista	22	5	8	9	22	34	−12	18
10	Racing	22	3	7	12	22	36	−14	13
11	Olimpia	22	3	3	16	29	59	−30	9
12	Capurro	22	2	2	18	19	50	−31	6

Source: rsssf.com

Uruguayan Champion 1931
Montevideo Wanderers
3rd title

== Notes and references ==
- Uruguay - List of final tables (RSSSF)
