= 1906 Campeonato Uruguayo Primera División =

6th season of the top-tier football league in Uruguay

Primera División
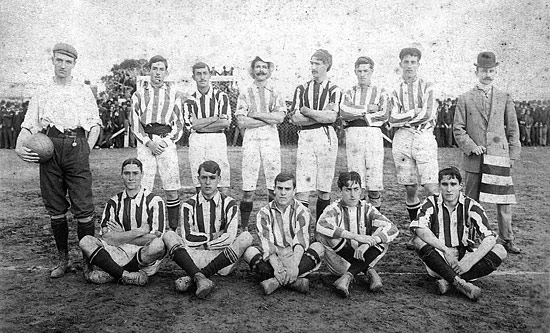
- Montevideo Wanderers, champions
- Season: 1906
- Champions: Montevideo Wanderers
- Matches: 30
- Goals: 75 (2.5 per match)
- Top goalscorer: Rafael de Miquelenera (6) (Montevideo Wanderers)

The 1905 Primera División was the 5th. season of top-flight football in Uruguay.

== Overview ==
The tournament consisted of a round-robin championship. It involved six teams, and the champion was Montevideo Wanderers, being the first time that a club other than CURCC or Nacional won the Primera División.

As a curiosity during this championship, Nacional presented two teams to the competition, their official team and a second team formed by substitutes players, which was called "Nacional B". This was the first and only time in the editions of the Uruguayan Championships that a club participated with two teams.

== Teams ==
Team	City	Stadium	Capacity	Foundation	Seasons	Consecutive seasons	Titles	1905
CURCC	Montevideo			28 September 1891	5	5	3	1st
Intrépido	Montevideo				-	-	-	-
Nacional	Montevideo	Gran Parque Central	7,000	14 May 1899	4	4	2	2nd
Nacional "B"	Montevideo	Gran Parque Central	7,000	14 May 1899	-	-	-	-
Teutonia	Montevideo			1896	5	5	-	4th
Montevideo Wanderers	Montevideo			15 August 1902	2	2	-	3rd

== League standings ==
Pos	Team	Pld	W	D	L	GF	GA	GD	Pts
1	Montevideo Wanderers	10	9	1	0	17	3	+14	19
2	CURCC	10	7	0	3	18	8	+10	14
3	Nacional	10	7	0	3	17	8	+9	14
4	Teutonia	10	4	1	5	20	22	−2	9
5	Intrépido	10	2	0	8	1	24	−23	4
6	Nacional "B"	10	0	0	10	2	10	−8	0

Source: rsssf.com

1906 Primera División Champion

1st title
