= 1972 Campeonato Uruguayo Primera División =

69th season of the top-tier football league in Uruguay

Statistics of Primera División Uruguaya for the 1972 season.

== Overview ==
It was contested by 12 teams, and Nacional won the championship.

== League standings ==
Pos	Team	Pld	W	D	L	GF	GA	GD	Pts
1	Nacional	22	16	4	2	55	21	+34	36
2	Peñarol	22	10	8	4	26	13	+13	28
3	Defensor	22	9	8	5	25	14	+11	26
4	Huracán Buceo	22	6	11	5	23	17	+6	23
5	Cerro	22	10	3	9	28	31	−3	23
6	Liverpool	22	7	8	7	20	19	+1	22
7	River Plate	22	6	9	7	23	21	+2	21
8	Sud América	22	6	9	7	20	23	−3	21
9	Rentistas	22	5	10	7	14	23	−9	20
10	Danubio	22	4	10	8	26	31	−5	18
11	Bella Vista	22	5	7	10	24	43	−19	17
12	Central Español	22	0	9	13	24	52	−28	9

Source: rsssf.com
