= 1945 Campeonato Uruguayo Primera División =

42nd season of the top-tier football league in Uruguay

Uruguayan Primera División
- Season: 1946
- Champions: Peñarol (16th. title)

Statistics of Primera División Uruguaya for the 1945 season.

== Overview ==
It was contested by 10 teams, and Peñarol won the championship.

== League standings ==
| Pos | Team | Pld | W | D | L | GF | GA | GD | Pts |
|---|---|---|---|---|---|---|---|---|---|
| 1 | Peñarol | 18 | 15 | 1 | 2 | 60 | 19 | +41 | 31 |
| 2 | Nacional | 18 | 10 | 5 | 3 | 54 | 28 | +26 | 25 |
| 3 | Defensor | 18 | 8 | 6 | 4 | 37 | 31 | +6 | 22 |
| 4 | River Plate | 18 | 8 | 5 | 5 | 33 | 29 | +4 | 21 |
| 5 | Central | 18 | 8 | 3 | 7 | 39 | 37 | +2 | 19 |
| 6 | Rampla Juniors | 18 | 7 | 5 | 6 | 31 | 33 | −2 | 19 |
| 7 | Liverpool | 18 | 4 | 6 | 8 | 31 | 35 | −4 | 14 |
| 8 | Miramar | 18 | 6 | 2 | 10 | 25 | 42 | −17 | 14 |
| 9 | Montevideo Wanderers | 18 | 2 | 4 | 12 | 16 | 40 | −24 | 8 |
| 10 | Sud América | 18 | 2 | 3 | 13 | 26 | 58 | −32 | 7 |

Source: rsssf.com
