= 1936 Campeonato Uruguayo Primera División =

33rd season of the top-tier football league in Uruguay

Uruguayan Primera División
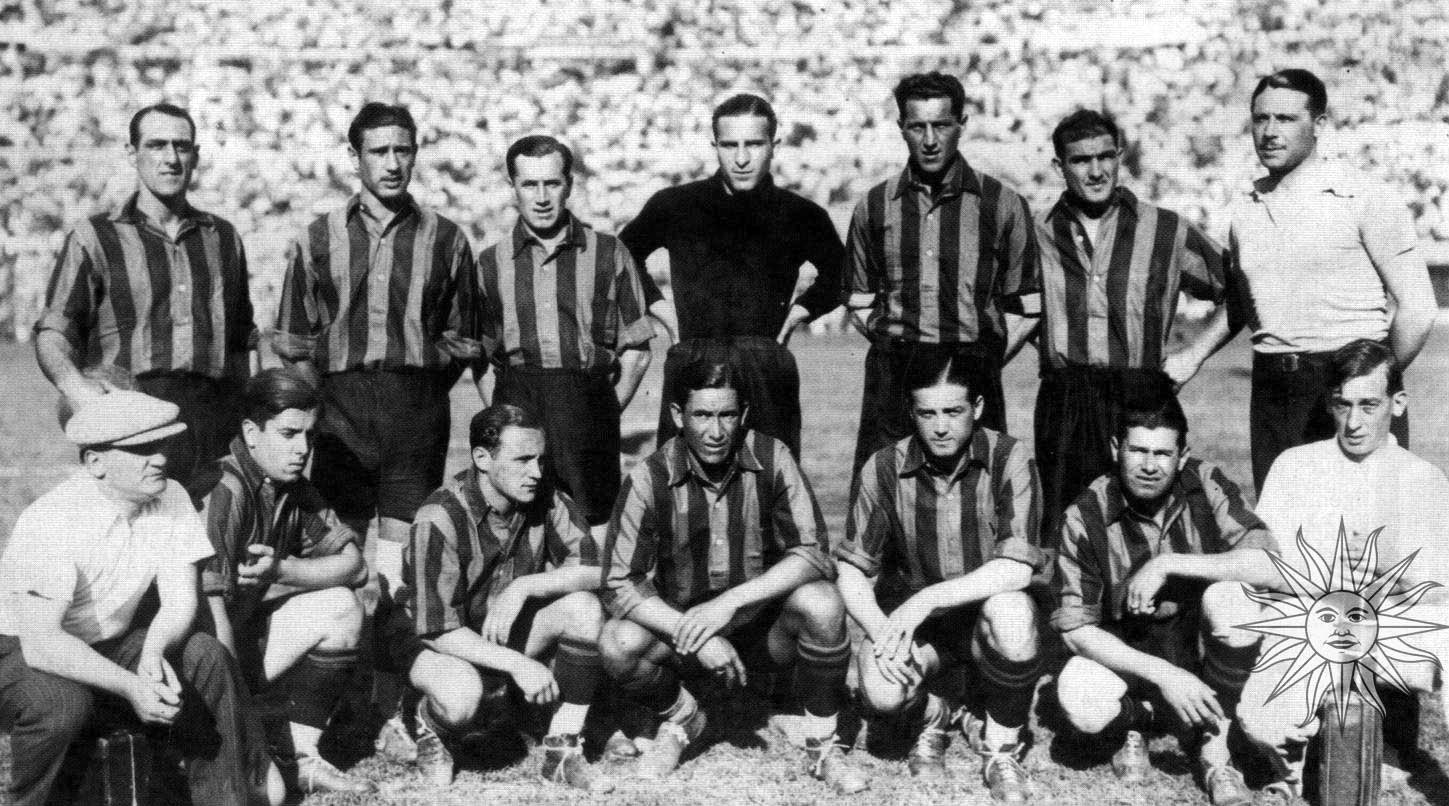
- Peñarol, champions
- Season: 1934 (33rd)
- Champions: Peñarol

Statistics of Primera División Uruguaya for the 1936 season.

== Overview ==
It was contested by 10 teams, and Peñarol won the championship.

== League standings ==
Pos	Team	Pld	W	D	L	GF	GA	GD	Pts
1	Peñarol	18	14	2	2	40	12	+28	30
2	Nacional	18	12	3	3	40	22	+18	27
3	Rampla Juniors	18	10	3	5	34	26	+8	23
4	River Plate	18	10	3	5	29	24	+5	23
5	Montevideo Wanderers	18	8	3	7	32	27	+5	19
6	Central	18	6	3	9	24	30	−6	15
7	Sud América	18	4	5	9	20	31	−11	13
8	Bella Vista	18	5	2	11	26	36	−10	12
9	Defensor	18	4	3	11	24	37	−13	11
10	Racing Montevideo	18	2	3	13	18	42	−24	7

Source: rsssf.com
