= 1952 Campeonato Uruguayo Primera División =

49th season of the top-tier football league in Uruguay

Uruguayan Primera División
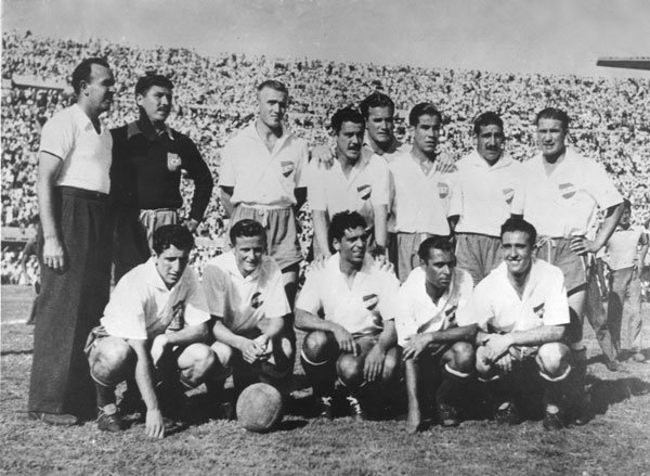
- Nacional, champions
- Season: 1952
- Champions: Nacional (22nd title)

Statistics of Primera División Uruguaya for the 1952 season.

== Overview ==
It was contested by 10 teams, and Nacional won the championship.

== League standings ==
Pos	Team	Pld	W	D	L	GF	GA	GD	Pts
1	Nacional	18	15	1	2	59	20	+39	31
2	Peñarol	18	15	1	2	46	14	+32	31
3	Rampla Juniors	18	6	7	5	34	29	+5	19
4	Danubio	18	7	4	7	33	28	+5	18
5	River Plate	18	7	2	9	29	34	−5	16
6	Cerro	18	6	3	9	24	28	−4	15
7	Defensor	18	5	5	8	29	40	−11	15
8	Liverpool	18	4	5	9	19	42	−23	13
9	Central	18	4	4	10	29	45	−16	12
10	Sud América	18	3	4	11	27	49	−22	10

Source: rsssf.com
