= 1933 Campeonato Uruguayo Primera División =

30th season of the top-tier football league in Uruguay

Uruguayan Primera División
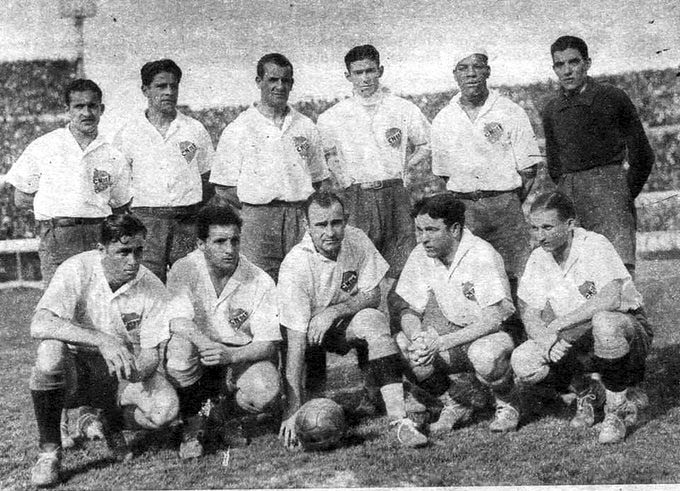
- Nacional, champions
- Season: 1933 (30th)
- Champions: Nacional

Statistics of Primera División Uruguaya for the 1933 season.

== Overview ==
It was contested by 10 teams, and Nacional won the championship.

== League standings ==
| Pos | Team | Pld | W | D | L | GF | GA | GD | Pts |
|---|---|---|---|---|---|---|---|---|---|
| 1 | Nacional | 27 | 20 | 6 | 1 | 56 | 10 | +46 | 46 |
| 2 | Peñarol | 27 | 21 | 4 | 2 | 77 | 18 | +59 | 46 |
| 3 | Rampla Juniors | 27 | 14 | 4 | 9 | 39 | 29 | +10 | 32 |
| 4 | Montevideo Wanderers | 27 | 11 | 9 | 7 | 39 | 36 | +3 | 31 |
| 5 | Defensor | 27 | 12 | 5 | 10 | 50 | 39 | +11 | 29 |
| 6 | Sud América | 27 | 9 | 7 | 11 | 30 | 40 | −10 | 25 |
| 7 | River Plate | 27 | 6 | 6 | 15 | 19 | 45 | −26 | 18 |
| 8 | Racing Montevideo | 27 | 4 | 7 | 16 | 29 | 58 | −29 | 15 |
| 9 | Central | 27 | 4 | 6 | 17 | 33 | 63 | −30 | 14 |
| 10 | Bella Vista | 27 | 6 | 2 | 19 | 27 | 61 | −34 | 14 |

Source: rsssf.com
- Playoff: Nacional-Peñarol 0-0, 0-0 and 3-2
