= 1960 Campeonato Uruguayo Primera División =

57th season of the top-tier football league in Uruguay

Uruguayan Primera División
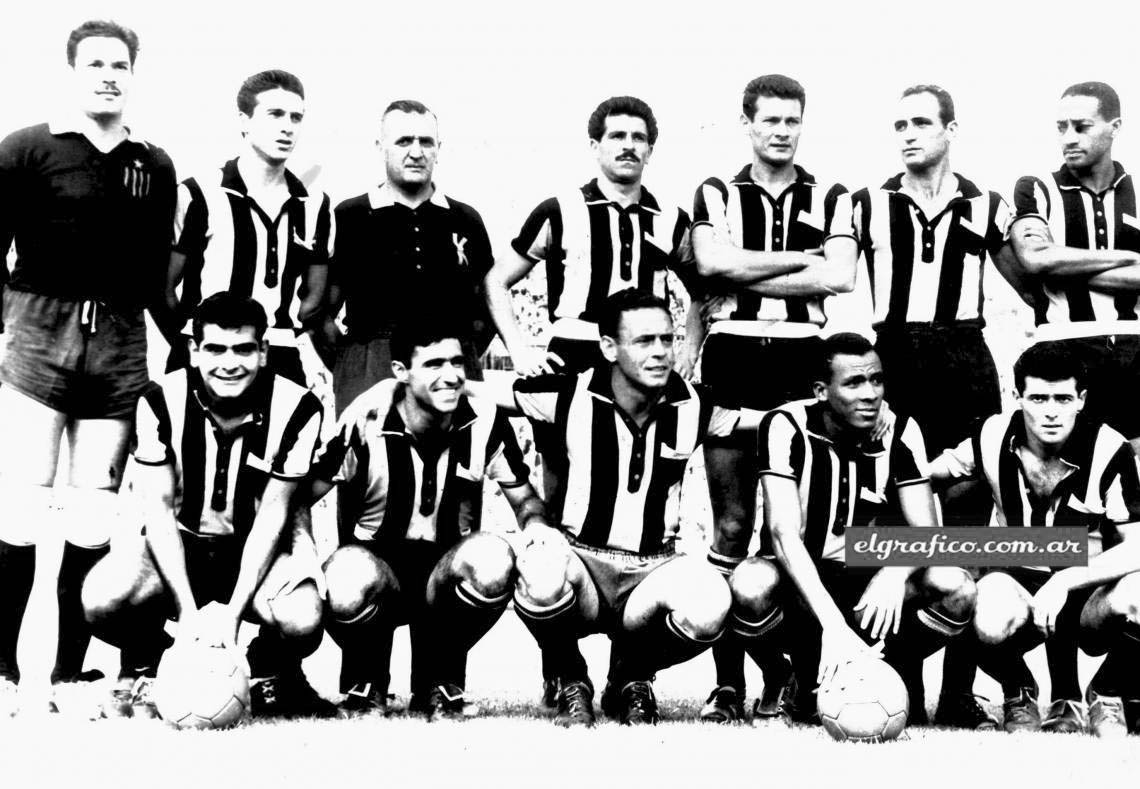
- Peñarol, champions
- Season: 1960
- Champions: Peñarol (23rd title)

Statistics of Primera División Uruguaya for the 1960 season.

== Overview ==
It was contested by 10 teams, and Peñarol won the championship.

== League standings ==
Pos	Team	Pld	W	D	L	GF	GA	GD	Pts
1	Peñarol	18	11	6	1	44	18	+26	28
2	Cerro	18	13	2	3	43	21	+22	28
3	Nacional	18	10	4	4	45	22	+23	24
4	Fénix	18	5	6	7	20	31	−11	16
5	Defensor	18	3	9	6	17	22	−5	15
6	Racing Montevideo	18	7	1	10	26	32	−6	15
7	Rampla Juniors	18	5	5	8	20	32	−12	15
8	Montevideo Wanderers	18	5	5	8	19	27	−8	15
9	Liverpool	18	6	2	10	25	36	−11	14
10	Sud América	18	3	4	11	15	33	−18	10

Source: rsssf.com
