= 1969 Campeonato Uruguayo Primera División =

66th season of the top-tier football league in Uruguay

Statistics of Primera División Uruguaya for the 1969 season.

== Overview ==
It was contested by 11 teams, and Nacional won the championship.

== League standings ==
Pos	Team	Pld	W	D	L	GF	GA	GD	Pts
1	Nacional	20	16	4	0	47	8	+39	36
2	Peñarol	20	12	6	2	33	12	+21	30
3	Bella Vista	20	9	5	6	25	15	+10	23
4	Racing Montevideo	20	7	7	6	25	25	0	21
5	Sud América	20	7	6	7	25	20	+5	20
6	River Plate	20	6	8	6	24	28	−4	20
7	Cerro	20	5	6	9	12	20	−8	16
8	Defensor	20	4	7	9	13	30	−17	15
9	Rampla Juniors	20	3	8	9	17	35	−18	14
10	Liverpool	20	4	6	10	15	25	−10	14
11	Danubio	20	3	5	12	16	34	−18	11

Source: rsssf.com
