= 1993 Campeonato Uruguayo Primera División =

90th season of the top-tier football league in Uruguay

Statistics of Primera División Uruguaya for the 1993 season.

== Overview ==
It was contested by 13 teams, and Peñarol won the championship.

== League standings ==
Pos	Team	Pld	W	D	L	GF	GA	GD	Pts
1	Peñarol	24	16	4	4	50	19	+31	36
2	Defensor Sporting	24	13	8	3	27	14	+13	34
3	Danubio	24	13	6	5	29	18	+11	32
4	Nacional	24	11	7	6	38	28	+10	29
5	Progreso	24	6	13	5	24	23	+1	25
6	Cerro	24	8	8	8	24	25	−1	24
7	Montevideo Wanderers	24	7	8	9	23	25	−2	22
8	Rampla Juniors	24	5	11	8	17	24	−7	21
9	Liverpool	24	6	8	10	16	24	−8	20
10	River Plate	24	6	8	10	20	32	−12	20
11	Bella Vista	24	6	6	12	19	26	−7	18
12	Huracán Buceo	24	5	8	11	31	43	−12	18
13	Racing Montevideo	24	3	7	14	10	27	−17	13

Source: rsssf.com
