= 1989 Campeonato Uruguayo Primera División =

86th season of the top-tier football league in Uruguay

Statistics of Primera División Uruguaya for the 1989 season.

== Overview ==
It was contested by 13 teams, and Progreso won the championship.

== League standings ==
Pos	Team	Pld	W	D	L	GF	GA	GD	Pts
1	Progreso	12	9	2	1	18	8	+10	20
2	Nacional	12	5	5	2	20	13	+7	15
3	Peñarol	12	6	3	3	19	14	+5	15
4	Cerro	12	6	2	4	14	11	+3	14
5	Bella Vista	12	3	8	1	13	10	+3	14
6	Defensor Sporting	12	3	8	1	11	8	+3	14
7	Danubio	12	5	3	4	18	15	+3	13
8	Montevideo Wanderers	12	5	3	4	14	16	−2	13
9	Rentistas	12	3	4	5	13	17	−4	10
10	Huracán Buceo	12	2	4	6	11	17	−6	8
11	Liverpool	12	3	2	7	6	13	−7	8
12	Central Español	12	1	5	6	15	22	−7	7
13	River Plate	12	2	1	9	7	15	−8	5

Source: rsssf.com
