= 1905 Campeonato Uruguayo Primera División =

5th season of the top-tier football league in Uruguay

Primera División
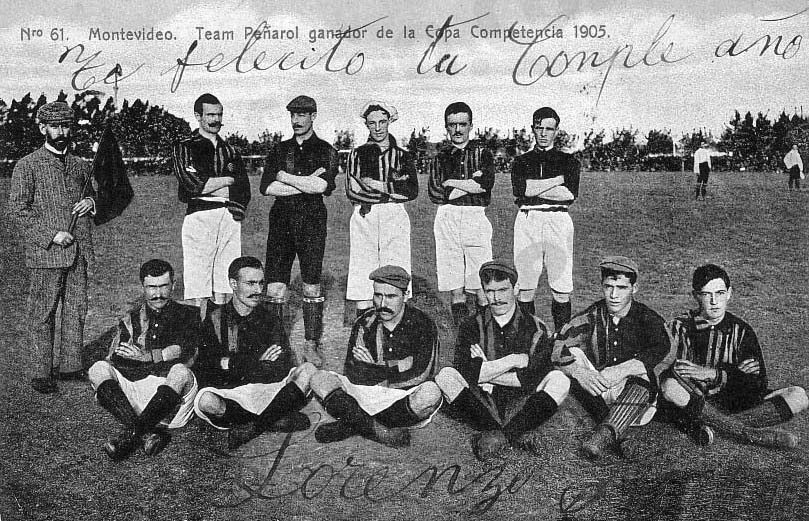
- CURCC, champions
- Season: 1905
- Champions: CURCC (3rd title)
- Matches: 20
- Goals: 48 (2.4 per match)
- Top goalscorer: Aniceto Camacho (6) (CURCC)

The 1905 Primera División was the 5th season of top-flight football in Uruguay. CURCC won its 3rd. league title, after winning all matches played.

== Overview ==
The tournament consisted of a round-robin championship. It involved five teams, and was marked by the death of Nacional symbol footballers, Carlos and Bolivar Céspedes, due to the smallpox epidemic in June of that year. In turn, the lackluster performance of Albion hinted that the end was near for this institution, which did not fit with semi professional practices that began to appear in some institutions.

== Teams ==
Team	City	Stadium	Capacity	Foundation	Seasons	Consecutive seasons	Titles	1903
Albion	Montevideo			1 June 1891	4	4	-	5th
CURCC	Montevideo			28 September 1891	4	4	2	2nd
Nacional	Montevideo	Gran Parque Central	7,000	14 May 1899	3	3	2	1st
Teutonia	Montevideo			1896	4	4	-	3rd
Montevideo Wanderers	Montevideo			15 August 1902	1	1	-	4th

== League standings ==
Pos	Team	Pld	W	D	L	GF	GA	GD	Pts
1	CURCC	8	8	0	0	21	0	+21	16
2	Nacional	8	6	0	2	14	7	+7	12
3	Montevideo Wanderers	8	3	1	4	7	9	−2	7
4	Teutonia	8	2	1	5	6	18	−12	5
5	Albion	8	0	0	8	0	14	−14	0

Source: rsssf.com

1905 Primera División Champion
CURCC
3rd title
