= 1994 Campeonato Uruguayo Primera División =

91st season of the top-tier football league in Uruguay

Statistics of Primera División Uruguaya for the 1994 season.

== Overview ==
It was contested by 13 teams, and Peñarol won the championship.

== Apertura ==
| Pos | Team | Pld | W | D | L | GF | GA | GD | Pts |
|---|---|---|---|---|---|---|---|---|---|
| 1 | Defensor Sporting | 12 | 7 | 3 | 2 | 17 | 11 | +6 | 17 |
| 2 | Basáñez | 12 | 6 | 4 | 2 | 14 | 12 | +2 | 16 |
| 3 | Peñarol | 12 | 9 | 0 | 3 | 29 | 9 | +20 | 14 (Note: 4 points deducted.) |
| 4 | Cerro | 12 | 5 | 4 | 3 | 14 | 10 | +4 | 14 |
| 5 | Montevideo Wanderers | 12 | 6 | 2 | 4 | 17 | 18 | −1 | 14 |
| 6 | River Plate | 12 | 5 | 2 | 5 | 17 | 17 | 0 | 12 |
| 7 | Nacional | 12 | 6 | 3 | 3 | 25 | 14 | +11 | 11 |
| 8 | Progreso | 12 | 4 | 2 | 6 | 17 | 17 | 0 | 10 |
| 9 | Liverpool | 12 | 3 | 3 | 6 | 11 | 16 | −5 | 9 |
| 10 | Rampla Juniors | 12 | 2 | 5 | 5 | 10 | 17 | −7 | 9 |
| 11 | Danubio | 12 | 2 | 5 | 5 | 8 | 15 | −7 | 9 |
| 12 | Central Español | 12 | 2 | 4 | 6 | 7 | 18 | −11 | 8 |
| 13 | Bella Vista | 12 | 0 | 5 | 7 | 13 | 25 | −12 | 5 |

Source: rsssf.com

== Clausura ==
| Pos | Team | Pld | W | D | L | GF | GA | GD | Pts |
|---|---|---|---|---|---|---|---|---|---|
| 1 | Peñarol | 12 | 10 | 0 | 2 | 33 | 9 | +24 | 20 |
| 2 | Nacional | 12 | 7 | 3 | 2 | 19 | 11 | +8 | 17 |
| 3 | Montevideo Wanderers | 12 | 5 | 4 | 3 | 19 | 14 | +5 | 14 |
| 4 | Cerro | 12 | 4 | 6 | 2 | 15 | 13 | +2 | 14 |
| 5 | Defensor Sporting | 12 | 4 | 5 | 3 | 12 | 7 | +5 | 13 |
| 6 | Central Español | 12 | 5 | 3 | 4 | 15 | 16 | −1 | 13 |
| 7 | Liverpool | 12 | 5 | 2 | 5 | 13 | 11 | +2 | 12 |
| 8 | River Plate | 12 | 4 | 2 | 6 | 9 | 9 | 0 | 10 |
| 9 | Rampla Juniors | 12 | 2 | 6 | 4 | 5 | 11 | −6 | 10 |
| 10 | Danubio | 12 | 3 | 3 | 6 | 11 | 18 | −7 | 9 |
| 11 | Bella Vista | 12 | 3 | 3 | 6 | 11 | 19 | −8 | 9 |
| 12 | Basáñez | 12 | 2 | 4 | 6 | 9 | 19 | −10 | 8 |
| 13 | Progreso | 12 | 3 | 1 | 8 | 7 | 21 | −14 | 7 |

Source: rsssf.com

== Overall ==
| Pos | Team | Pld | W | D | L | GF | GA | GD | Pts |
|---|---|---|---|---|---|---|---|---|---|
| 1 | Peñarol | 24 | 19 | 0 | 5 | 62 | 18 | +44 | 34 (Note: 4 points deducted.) |
| 2 | Defensor Sporting | 24 | 11 | 8 | 5 | 29 | 18 | +11 | 30 |
| 3 | Nacional | 24 | 13 | 6 | 5 | 44 | 25 | +19 | 28 |
| 4 | Cerro | 24 | 9 | 10 | 5 | 29 | 23 | +6 | 28 |
| 5 | Montevideo Wanderers | 24 | 11 | 6 | 7 | 36 | 32 | +4 | 28 |
| 6 | Basáñez | 24 | 8 | 8 | 8 | 23 | 31 | −8 | 24 |
| 7 | River Plate | 24 | 9 | 4 | 11 | 26 | 26 | 0 | 22 |
| 8 | Liverpool | 24 | 8 | 5 | 11 | 24 | 27 | −3 | 21 |
| 9 | Central Español | 24 | 7 | 7 | 10 | 22 | 34 | −12 | 21 |
| 10 | Rampla Juniors | 24 | 4 | 11 | 9 | 15 | 28 | −13 | 19 |
| 11 | Danubio | 24 | 5 | 8 | 11 | 19 | 33 | −14 | 18 |
| 12 | Progreso | 24 | 7 | 3 | 14 | 24 | 38 | −14 | 17 |
| 13 | Bella Vista | 24 | 3 | 8 | 13 | 24 | 44 | −20 | 14 |

Source: rsssf.com

== Playoff ==
- Peñarol 1-1; 1-1; 2-1 Defensor Sporting

Peñarol won the championship.
