= 1928 Campeonato Uruguayo Primera División =

26th season of the top-tier football league in Uruguay

Uruguayan Primera División
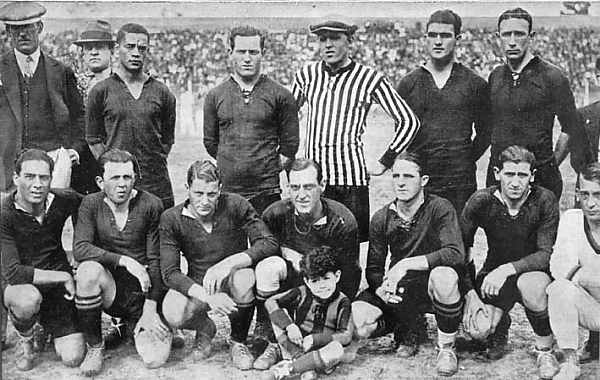
- Peñarol, champions
- Season: 1928 (26th)
- Champions: Peñarol
- 1928 Copa Aldao: Peñarol
- Matches: 240
- Goals: 562 (2.34 per match)

The Uruguayan Championship 1928 was the 26th season of Uruguay's top-flight football league.

== Overview ==
The tournament consisted of a two-wheel championship of all against all. It involved sixteen teams, and the champion was Peñarol.

== Teams ==
Team	City	Stadium	Capacity	Foundation	Seasons	Consecutive seasons	Titles	1927
Bella Vista	Montevideo	Parque Olivos		4 October 1920	3	3	-	10th
Capurro	Montevideo	Parque Narancio		31 October 1914	1	1	-	12th
Cerro	Montevideo	Parque Santa Rosa		1 December 1922	1	1	-	13th
Colón	Montevideo			12 March 1907	-	-	-	-
Defensor	Montevideo	Parque Ricci		15 March 1913	4	1	-	6th
Lito	Montevideo			1917	5	5	-	9th
Liverpool	Montevideo			15 February 1915	6	6	-	14th
Misiones	Montevideo	Parque Chaná		26 May 1906	2	1	-	7th
Nacional	Montevideo	Gran Parque Central	15,000	14 May 1899	24	24	11	3rd
Olimpia	Montevideo	Olimpia Park		13 March 1922	1	1	-	8th
Peñarol	Montevideo	Estadio Pocitos	1,000	28 September 1891	23	1	7	2nd
Racing	Montevideo			6 April 1919	2	2	-	15th
Rampla Juniors	Montevideo	Parque Nelson		7 January 1914	4	4	1	1st
Sud América	Montevideo			15 January 1914	1	1	-	5th
Uruguay Onward	Montevideo				6	6	-	11th
Montevideo Wanderers	Montevideo	Estadio Belvedere		15 August 1902	22	22	2	4th

== League standings ==
Pos	Team	Pld	W	D	L	GF	GA	GD	Pts
1	Peñarol	30	20	5	5	66	22	+44	45
2	Rampla Juniors	30	15	7	8	44	24	+20	37
3	Nacional	30	12	11	7	40	26	+14	35
4	Cerro	30	11	12	7	32	33	−1	34
5	Sud América	30	11	11	8	28	21	+7	33
6	Defensor	30	12	8	10	36	32	+4	32
7	Capurro	30	11	10	9	30	33	−3	32
8	Misiones	30	11	9	10	36	35	+1	31
9	Bella Vista	30	11	8	11	35	34	+1	30
10	Colón	30	10	9	11	33	43	−10	29
11	Montevideo Wanderers	30	9	10	11	25	29	−4	28
12	Olimpia	30	9	10	11	31	44	−13	28
13	Liverpool	29	8	10	11	30	34	−4	26
14	Uruguay Onward	30	7	7	16	31	53	−22	21
15	Racing	30	7	6	17	33	49	−16	20
16	Lito	30	5	9	16	32	50	−18	19

Source: rsssf.com

Uruguayan Champion 1928
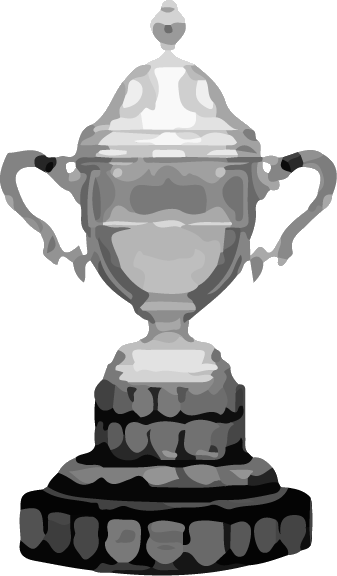
Peñarol
8th title
