= Liga AUF Uruguaya =

Professional association football league in Uruguay

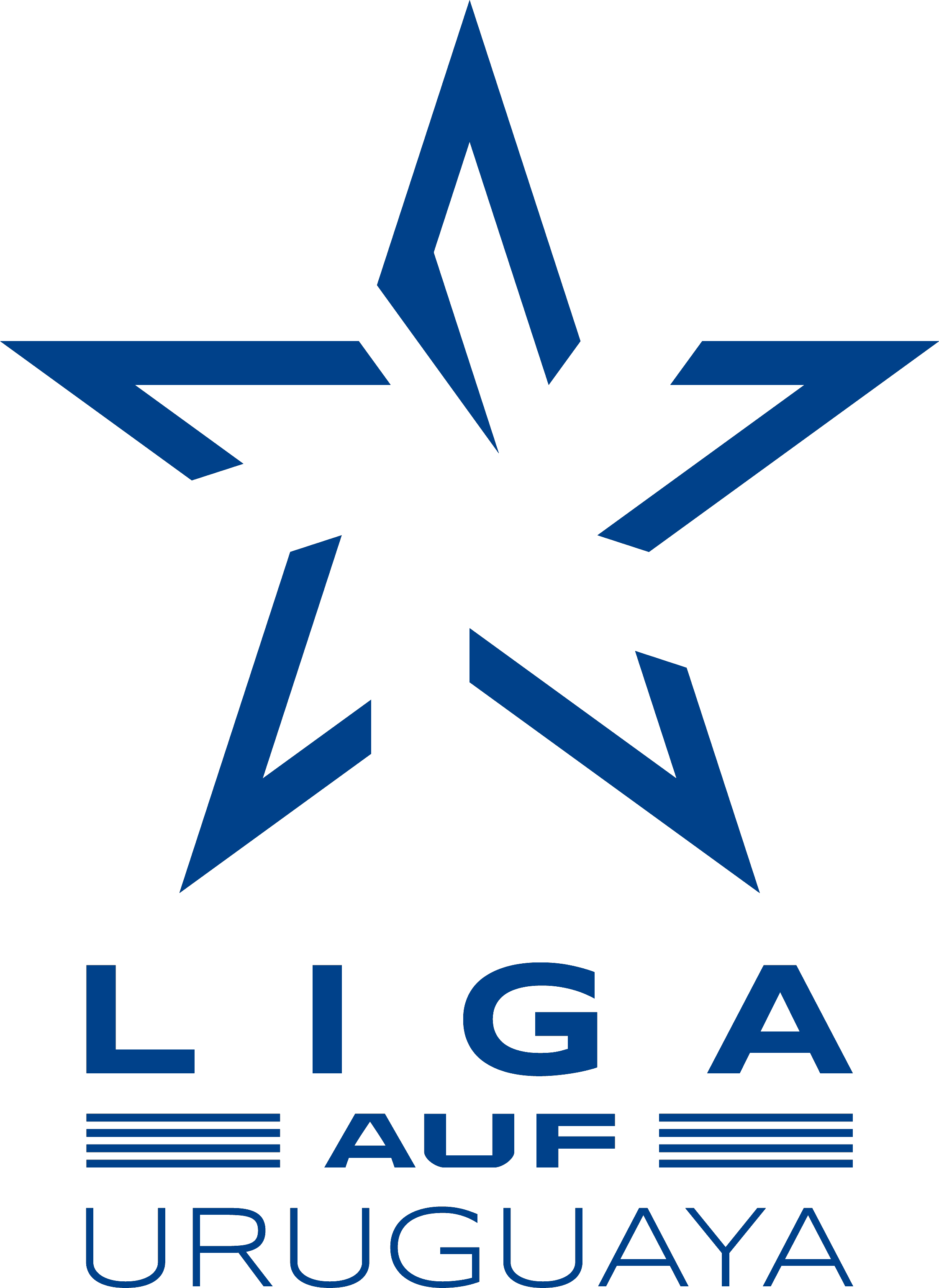
- Founded: 1900; 126 years ago
- Country: Uruguay
- Confederation: CONMEBOL
- Number of clubs: 16
- Level on pyramid: 1
- Relegation to: Segunda División
- Domestic cup(s): Copa Uruguay; Supercopa Uruguaya; Copa de la Liga AUF
- International cup(s): Copa Libertadores; Copa Sudamericana
- Current champions: Nacional (50th title) (2025)
- Most championships: Peñarol / CURCC (52 titles) (Note: Controversy exists on the date of the founding of C.A. Peñarol. The club's official position assumes a change of name of CURCC (founded on 28 December 1891). On the other hand, some historians state that "C.A. Peñarol" was established on 13 December 1913.)
- Top scorer: Fernando Morena (230)
- Broadcasters: DirecTV Sports, Disney+, Tenfield, Antel TV
- Website: auf.org.uy
- Current: 2026 season

The Liga AUF Uruguaya, also known as Liga Profesional de Primera División (American Spanish [ˈliɣa pɾofesjoˈnal de pɾiˈmeɾa ðiβiˈsjon], English: First Division Professional League, local: [pɾiˈmeɾa ðiβiˈsjon], First Division), named "Torneo Uruguayo Copa Coca-Cola" for sponsorship reasons, is the highest professional football league in Uruguay organized by the Uruguayan Football Association (AUF).

The first championship was held in 1900, being an amateur competition until 1932 when the league became professional. From 1900 to the 2024 season there have been 121 first division seasons.

In 2011, the Uruguayan Primera División was regarded as the 23rd most difficult football league in the 21st century by the International Federation of Football History & Statistics (IFFHS).

If considered the same club, Peñarol/CURCC is the most successful Uruguayan club with 52 titles. Otherwise, it is Nacional with 50 titles. Of clubs to win titles, only Rampla Juniors did not win multiple titles. Rampla Juniors and Wanderers were the only clubs to not win titles consecutively.

== History ==
The Uruguayan Primera División was held for the first time in 1900. Between 1923 and 1925, under the Uruguayan football schism, a dissident league, the Federación Uruguaya de Football, was established. The body operated in parallel with the official Association (AUF). After an intervention by the Uruguayan government to impose the dissolution of the FUF, in 1926 a Provisional Council ("Concejo Provisorio") organised a championship to unify the two organizations. Peñarol was the winner of the Serie A of the tournament. Nevertheless, neither the AUF nor the FIFA recognised the titles of the championships organized by FUF or CP.

Results of the 'Big Two' since 2010.
Season	NAC	PEÑ
2009–10	2	1
2010–11	1	3
2011–12	1	3
2012–13	3	1
2013–14	3	5
2014–15	1	2
2015–16	2	1
2016	1	14
2017	3	1
2018	2	1
2019	1	2
2020	1	4
2021	2	1
2022	1	6
2023	3	2
2024	2	1
2025	1	2
2026		
TOTAL	8	7
Top three	17	13
out of 17
Champions; Second place Third place

From 1930 to 1975, either Nacional or Peñarol won every title. This streak was finally broken when Defensor won its first title in 1976. Besides Nacional or Peñarol, no other club has won titles consecutively. Both Peñarol (1958 to 1962 and 1993 to 1997) and Nacional (from 1939 to 1943) hold the record title streaks winning five titles consecutively. The longest period of time without neither Peñarol nor Nacional winning the title was from 1987 to 1991, when Defensor, Danubio, Progreso, Bella Vista, and again Defensor won the five tournaments played during that period.

After 1994, the competition was divided in two stages, called the Opening Championship (Torneo Apertura) and Closing Championship (Torneo Clausura), with an end-of-season two-legged final match between the winners of these two tournaments.

Originally, like other South American football leagues, the league was contested according to the calendar year, from austral summer to summer in the Southern Hemisphere. In 2005, the league started to play the "European season", from boreal summer to summer in Northern Hemisphere starting in August, with the aim of preventing clubs from losing many players in the middle of the season. In the first semester of 2005, a special short season was held to decide the qualification to international competition. In the 2005–06 season, the winners of the Apertura and Clausura tournaments played a two (or three) legged play-off; the winner of that playoff played against the best team in the aggregate table to decide the 2005–06 season champion.

In the 2006–07 season, the competition was reduced to 16 clubs. The season of 2008–09 was intended to be the last one to be played in "European season", as the system appeared to be unable to prevent clubs from losing players between the Apertura (opening) tournament and the Clausura (closing). However, the transition did not take place for several years. After a regular 2015–16 season was played, a short 2016 was played in the latter half of the year, with the full calendar year system in place once again beginning with the 2017 season.

== Division levels ==
Year	Level	Relegation to
1903–1914	1	Segunda División
1915–1941	1	Divisional Intermedia
1942–1995	1	Primera División B
1996–present	1	Segunda División Profesional

== Participating teams ==
A total of 60 teams have participated in the Primera Division since its inception in 1900. Nacional has played the most seasons followed by Peñarol/CURCC. Peñarol and Nacional are also the only two teams to have never been relegated out of the Primera Division. Of the so-called 'minor' teams the record for most seasons lies with Montevideo Wanderers.

=== 2026 season ===
All statistics pertain only to the Uruguayan Championships organized by the Uruguayan Football Association (AUF), not including FUF tournaments of 1923, 1924 and the 1926 Consejo Provisorio tournament in seasons counted. The founding dates of clubs are those declared by the clubs themselves involved. The column "stadium" reflects the stadium where the team play their home matches, but does not indicate that the team in question owns the stadium. (Note: Albion and Boston River present Estadio Luis Franzini in Montevideo and Estadio Campeones Olímpicos in Florida as their respective stadiums, but the former is owned by Defensor Sporting and the latter is owned by the Departamental Intendancy of Florida.)

Locations of the 2026 Liga AUF Uruguaya teams outside Montevideo.
Locations of the 2026 Liga AUF Uruguaya teams within Montevideo.

Club	City	Stadium	Capacity	Est.
Albion	Montevideo	Luis Franzini	16,000	1891
Boston River	Montevideo	Campeones Olímpicos	5,124	1939
Central Español	Montevideo	Parque Palermo	6,500	1905
Cerro	Montevideo	Luis Tróccoli	25,000	1922
Cerro Largo	Melo	Antonio Ubilla	9,000	2002
Danubio	Montevideo	Jardines del Hipódromo	18,000	1932
Defensor Sporting	Montevideo	Luis Franzini	16,000	1913
Deportivo Maldonado	Maldonado	Domingo Burgueño Miguel	22,000	1928
Juventud	Las Piedras	Parque Artigas	12,000	1935
Liverpool	Montevideo	Belvedere	10,000	1915
Montevideo City Torque	Montevideo	Centenario	60,235	2007
Montevideo Wanderers	Montevideo	Parque Alfredo Viera	11,000	1902
Nacional	Montevideo	Gran Parque Central	34,000	1899
Peñarol	Montevideo	Campeón del Siglo	40,000	1891 / 1913
Progreso	Montevideo	Abraham Paladino	8,000	1917
Racing	Montevideo	Osvaldo Roberto	8,500	1919

== Champions ==
=== List of champions (1900–present) ===
All tournaments organized by the Uruguayan Football Association (AUF) except where indicated.

- (In bracket, title count):

Ed.	Season	Champion	Runner-up	Third place	Winning manager
1	1900	CURCC (1)	Albion	Uruguay Athletic	— (Note: During the early years of football, teams did not have designated managers; instead, leadership responsibilities were typically assumed by the players themselves, most often by the team captain, who took on both organizational and tactical roles.)
2	1901	CURCC (2)	Nacional	Uruguay Athletic	—
3	1902	Nacional (1)	CURCC	Deutscher	—
4	1903	Nacional (2)	CURCC	Deutscher	—
–	1904	(No championship held) (Note: The 1904 championship was not played due to the Battle of Masoller)			
5	1905	CURCC (3)	Nacional	Montevideo Wanderers	
6	1906	Montevideo Wanderers (1)	CURCC	Nacional	
7	1907	CURCC (4)	Montevideo Wanderers	River Plate	
8	1908	River Plate (1)	Montevideo Wanderers	Nacional	
9	1909	Montevideo Wanderers (2)	CURCC	River Plate	
10	1910	River Plate (2)	CURCC	Nacional	
11	1911	CURCC (5)	Montevideo Wanderers	Nacional	
12	1912	Nacional (3)	CURCC	Montevideo Wanderers	
13	1913	River Plate (3)	Nacional	CURCC	
14	1914	River Plate (4)	Peñarol	Nacional	
15	1915	Nacional (4)	Peñarol	Universal	
16	1916	Nacional (5)	Peñarol	Montevideo Wanderers	
17	1917	Nacional (6)	Peñarol	Universal	
18	1918	Peñarol (6) (Note: Title count considering C.A. Peñarol as a continuity of CURCC)	Nacional	Universal	
19	1919	Nacional (7)	Universal	Peñarol	
20	1920	Nacional (8)	Peñarol	Central Español	
21	1921	Peñarol (7)	Nacional	Universal	
22	1922	Nacional (9)	Montevideo Wanderers	Rampla Juniors	
23	1923	Nacional (10)	Rampla Juniors	Bella Vista	
24	1924	Nacional (11)	Bella Vista	Rampla Juniors	
–	1925	(Not finished) (Note: The 1925 championship was not finished because of internal differences.)			
–	1926	(No championship held) (Note: As the AUF did not organise a championship, a "Concejo Provisorio" was established to hold a tournament, which was won by Peñarol)			
25	1927	Rampla Juniors (1)	Peñarol	Nacional	
26	1928	Peñarol (8)	Rampla Juniors	Nacional	
27	1929	Peñarol (9)	Nacional	Defensor Sporting	
–	1930	(No championship held) (Note: No championship was played because of the 1930 FIFA World Cup.)			
28	1931	Montevideo Wanderers (3)	Nacional	Rampla Juniors	
29	1932	Peñarol (10)	Rampla Juniors	Nacional	(Uruguay) Leonardo de Lucca
30	1933	Nacional (12)	Peñarol	Rampla Juniors	(Hungary) Américo Szigeti
31	1934	Nacional (13)	Peñarol	Montevideo Wanderers	(Hungary) Américo Szigeti
32	1935	Peñarol (11)	Nacional	Montevideo Wanderers	(Uruguay) Athuel Velázquez
33	1936	Peñarol (12)	Nacional	Rampla Juniors	(Uruguay) Athuel Velázquez
34	1937	Peñarol (13)	Nacional	Montevideo Wanderers	(Uruguay) Athuel Velázquez
35	1938	Peñarol (14)	Nacional	Central Español	(Uruguay) Athuel Velázquez
36	1939	Nacional (14)	Peñarol	Montevideo Wanderers	(Scotland) William Reaside
37	1940	Nacional (15)	Rampla Juniors	Montevideo Wanderers	(Uruguay) Héctor Castro
38	1941	Nacional (16)	Peñarol	Rampla Juniors	(Uruguay) Héctor Castro
39	1942	Nacional (17)	Peñarol	Montevideo Wanderers	(Uruguay) Héctor Castro
40	1943	Nacional (18)	Peñarol	Miramar Misiones	(Uruguay) Héctor Castro
41	1944	Peñarol (15)	Nacional	Defensor Sporting	(Uruguay) Aníbal Tejada
42	1945	Peñarol (16)	Nacional	Defensor Sporting	(Uruguay) Alberto Suppici
43	1946	Nacional (19)	Peñarol	CA River Plate	(Uruguay) Enrique Fernández
44	1947	Nacional (20)	Peñarol	Rampla Juniors	(Uruguay) Ricardo Faccio
–	1948	(Not finished) (Note: Not played due to a players strike)			
45	1949	Peñarol (17)	Nacional	Rampla Juniors	(Hungary) Emérico Hirsch
46	1950	Nacional (21)	Peñarol	Rampla Juniors	(Uruguay) Enrique Fernández
47	1951	Peñarol (18)	Nacional	Rampla Juniors	(Hungary) Emérico Hirsch
48	1952	Nacional (22)	Peñarol	Rampla Juniors	(Uruguay) Héctor Castro
49	1953	Peñarol (19)	Nacional	Rampla Juniors	(Uruguay) Juan López
50	1954	Peñarol (20)	Nacional	Danubio	(Uruguay) Juan López
51	1955	Nacional (23)	Peñarol	Cerro	(Uruguay) Ondino Viera
52	1956	Nacional (24)	Peñarol	Cerro	(Uruguay) Ondino Viera
53	1957	Nacional (25)	Peñarol	Defensor Sporting	(Uruguay) Ondino Viera
54	1958	Peñarol (21)	Nacional	Rampla Juniors	(Uruguay) Hugo Bagnulo
55	1959	Peñarol (22)	Nacional	Racing	(Uruguay) Roberto Scarone
56	1960	Peñarol (23)	Cerro	Nacional	(Uruguay) Roberto Scarone
57	1961	Peñarol (24)	Nacional	Defensor Sporting	(Uruguay) Roberto Scarone
58	1962	Peñarol (25)	Nacional	Fénix	(Uruguay) Peregrino Anselmo
59	1963	Nacional (26)	Peñarol	Montevideo Wanderers	(Brazil) Zezé Moreira
60	1964	Peñarol (26)	Rampla Juniors	Nacional	(Uruguay) Roque Máspoli
61	1965	Peñarol (27)	Nacional	Cerro	(Uruguay) Roque Máspoli
62	1966	Nacional (27)	Peñarol	Cerro	(Uruguay) Roberto Scarone
63	1967	Peñarol (28)	Nacional	Cerro	(Uruguay) Roque Máspoli
64	1968	Peñarol (29)	Nacional	Cerro	(Uruguay) Rafael Milans
65	1969	Nacional (28)	Peñarol	Bella Vista	(Brazil) Zezé Moreira
66	1970	Nacional (29)	Peñarol	Huracán Buceo	(Uruguay) Washington Etchamendi
67	1971	Nacional (30)	Peñarol	Liverpool	(Uruguay) Washington Etchamendi
68	1972	Nacional (31)	Peñarol	Defensor Sporting	(Uruguay) Washington Etchamendi
69	1973	Peñarol (30)	Nacional	Danubio	(Uruguay) Hugo Bagnulo
70	1974	Peñarol (31)	Nacional	Liverpool	(Uruguay) Hugo Bagnulo
71	1975	Peñarol (32)	Nacional	Liverpool	(Uruguay) Hugo Bagnulo
72	1976	Defensor Sporting (1)	Peñarol	Nacional	(Uruguay) José Ricardo de León
73	1977	Nacional (32)	Peñarol	Defensor Sporting	(Argentina) Pedro Dellacha
74	1978	Peñarol (33)	Nacional	Fénix	(Brazil) Dino Sani
75	1979	Peñarol (34)	Nacional	Fénix	(Brazil) Dino Sani
76	1980	Nacional (33)	Montevideo Wanderers	Peñarol	(Uruguay) Juan Mujica
77	1981	Peñarol (35)	Nacional	Montevideo Wanderers	(Uruguay) Luis Cubilla
78	1982	Peñarol (36)	Nacional	Defensor Sporting	(Uruguay) Hugo Bagnulo
79	1983	Nacional (34)	Danubio	Defensor Sporting	(Uruguay) Vícor Espárrago
80	1984	Central Español (1)	Peñarol	Nacional	(Uruguay) Líber Arispe
81	1985	Peñarol (37)	Montevideo Wanderers	Cerro	(Uruguay) Roque Máspoli
82	1986	Peñarol (38)	Nacional	Central Español	(Uruguay) Roque Máspoli
83	1987	Defensor Sporting (2)	Nacional	Bella Vista	(Uruguay) Raúl Möller
84	1988	Danubio (1)	Peñarol	Defensor Sporting	(Uruguay) Ildo Maneiro
85	1989	Progreso (1)	Nacional	Peñarol	(Uruguay) Saúl Rivero
86	1990	Bella Vista (1)	Nacional	Peñarol	(Uruguay) Manuel Keosseian
87	1991	Defensor Sporting (3)	Nacional	Montevideo Wanderers	(Uruguay) Juan Ahuntchaín
88	1992	Nacional (35)	CA River Plate	Danubio	(Uruguay) Roberto Fleitas
89	1993	Peñarol (39)	Defensor Sporting	Danubio	(Uruguay) Gregorio Pérez
90	1994	Peñarol (40)	Defensor Sporting	Nacional	(Uruguay) Gregorio Pérez
91	1995	Peñarol (41)	Nacional	Liverpool	(Uruguay) Gregorio Pérez
92	1996	Peñarol (42)	Nacional	Defensor Sporting	(Uruguay) Jorge Fossati
93	1997	Peñarol (43)	Defensor Sporting	CA River Plate	(Uruguay) Gregorio Pérez
94	1998	Nacional (36)	Peñarol	Bella Vista	(Uruguay) Hugo de León
95	1999	Peñarol (44)	Nacional	Defensor Sporting	(Uruguay) Julio Ribas
96	2000	Nacional (37)	Peñarol	Defensor Sporting	(Uruguay) Hugo de León
97	2001	Nacional (38)	Danubio	Peñarol	(Uruguay) Hugo de León
98	2002	Nacional (39)	Danubio	Peñarol	(Uruguay) Daniel Carreño
99	2003	Peñarol (45)	Nacional	Danubio	(Uruguay) Diego Aguirre
100	2004	Danubio (2)	Nacional	Defensor Sporting	(Uruguay) Gerardo Pelusso
101	2005	Nacional (40)	Defensor Sporting	Peñarol	(Uruguay) Martín Lasarte
102	2005–06	Nacional (41)	Rocha	Defensor Sporting	(Uruguay) Martín Lasarte
103	2006–07	Danubio (3)	Peñarol	Defensor Sporting	(Uruguay) Gustavo Matosas
104	2007–08	Defensor Sporting (4)	Peñarol	CA River Plate	(Uruguay) Jorge da Silva
105	2008–09	Nacional (42)	Defensor Sporting	Cerro	(Uruguay) Gerardo Pelusso
106	2009–10	Peñarol (46)	Nacional	Liverpool	(Uruguay) Diego Aguirre
107	2010–11	Nacional (43)	Defensor Sporting	Peñarol	(Uruguay) Juan Ramón Carrasco
108	2011–12	Nacional (44)	Peñarol	Defensor Sporting	(Argentina) Marcelo Gallardo
109	2012–13	Peñarol (47)	Defensor Sporting	Nacional	(Uruguay) Jorge da Silva
110	2013–14	Danubio (4)	Montevideo Wanderers	Nacional	(Uruguay) Leonardo Ramos
111	2014–15	Nacional (45)	Peñarol	River Plate	(Uruguay) Álvaro Gutiérrez
112	2015–16	Peñarol (48)	Nacional	Cerro	(Uruguay) Jorge da Silva
113	2016	Nacional (46)	Montevideo Wanderers	Danubio	(Uruguay) Martín Lasarte
114	2017	Peñarol (49)	Defensor Sporting	Nacional	(Uruguay) Leonardo Ramos
115	2018	Peñarol (50)	Nacional	Danubio	(Uruguay) Diego López
116	2019	Nacional (47)	Peñarol	Cerro Largo	(Uruguay) Álvaro Gutiérrez
117	2020	Nacional (48)	Rentistas	Liverpool	(Uruguay) Martín Ligüera
118	2021	Peñarol (51)	Nacional	Plaza Colonia	(Uruguay) Mauricio Larriera
119	2022	Nacional (49)	Liverpool	Deportivo Maldonado	(Uruguay) Pablo Repetto
120	2023	Liverpool (1)	Peñarol	Nacional	(Uruguay) Jorge Bava
121	2024	Peñarol (52)	Nacional	Boston River	(Uruguay) Diego Aguirre
122	2025	Nacional (50)	Peñarol	Liverpool	(Uruguay) Jadson Viera
123	2026				

== Titles by club ==
As of 30 November 2025

- Clubs participating in the 2026 Liga AUF Uruguaya are denoted in **bold** type.
- Clubs no longer active are denoted in italics.

Rank	Club	Winners	Runners-up	Winning years	Runners-up years
1	**CURCC / Peñarol**	52	43	1900, 1901, 1905, 1907, 1911, (Note: (1901–1911): Titles won by the CURCC. With FIFA and CONMEBOL recognising Peñarol as CURCC's continuity, the club included those championship in their list of honours. On the other side, some historians say that football became active in CURCC until its dissolution in 1913 so Peñarol was a different institution.) 1918, 1921, 1928, 1929, 1932, 1935, 1936, 1937, 1938, 1944, 1945, 1949, 1951, 1953, 1954, 1958, 1959, 1960, 1961, 1962, 1964, 1965, 1967, 1968, 1973, 1974, 1975, 1978, 1979, 1981, 1982, 1985, 1986, 1993, 1994, 1995, 1996, 1997, 1999, 2003, 2009–10, 2012–13, 2015–16, 2017, 2018, 2021, 2024	1902, 1903, 1906, 1909, 1910, 1912, 1914, 1915, 1916, 1917, 1920, 1927, 1933, 1934, 1939, 1941, 1942, 1943, 1946, 1950, 1952, 1955, 1956, 1957, 1963, 1966, 1969, 1970, 1971, 1972, 1976, 1977, 1984, 1988, 1998, 2000, 2006–07, 2007–08, 2011–12, 2014–15, 2019, 2023, 2025
2	**Nacional**	50	46	1902, 1903, 1912, 1915, 1916, 1917, 1919, 1920, 1922, 1923, 1924, 1933, 1934, 1939, 1940, 1941, 1942, 1943, 1946, 1947, 1950, 1952, 1955, 1956, 1957, 1963, 1966, 1969, 1970, 1971, 1972, 1977, 1980, 1983, 1992, 1998, 2000, 2001, 2002, 2005, 2005–06, 2008–09, 2010–11, 2011–12, 2014–15, 2016, 2019, 2020, 2022, 2025	1901, 1905, 1913, 1918, 1921, 1929, 1931, 1935, 1936, 1937, 1938, 1944, 1945, 1949, 1951, 1953, 1954, 1958, 1959, 1961, 1962, 1965, 1967, 1968, 1973, 1974, 1975, 1978, 1979, 1981, 1982, 1986, 1987, 1989, 1990, 1991, 1995, 1996, 1999, 2003, 2004, 2009–10, 2015–16, 2018, 2021, 2024
3	**Defensor Sporting**	4	9	1976, 1987, 1991, 2007–08	1993, 1994, 1997, 2005, 2008–09, 2010–11, 2012–13, 2017
3	**Danubio**	4	3	1988, 2004, 2006–07, 2013–14	1983, 2001, 2002
3	River Plate FC	4	—	1908, 1910, 1913, 1914	—
6	**Montevideo Wanderers**	3	8	1906, 1909, 1931	1907, 1908, 1911, 1922, 1980, 1985, 2013–14, 2016
7	Rampla Juniors	1	5	1927	1923, 1928, 1932, 1940, 1964
7	Bella Vista	1	1	1990	1924
7	**Liverpool**	1	1	2023	2022
7	**Central Español**	1	—	1984	—
7	**Progreso**	1	—	1989	—

== Half-year / Short tournaments ==
=== Apertura and Clausura seasons ===
Season		Champion	Runner-up	Third place
1994	Apertura	Defensor Sporting	Basáñez	Peñarol
1994	Clausura	Peñarol	Nacional	Montevideo Wanderers
1995	Apertura	Peñarol	Liverpool	Nacional
1995	Clausura	Nacional	Peñarol	Rampla Juniors
1996	Apertura	Peñarol	Defensor Sporting	Nacional
1996	Clausura	Nacional	Rampla Juniors	Huracán Buceo
1997	Apertura	Nacional	River Plate	Peñarol
1997	Clausura	Defensor Sporting	Peñarol	River Plate
1998	Apertura	Nacional	Bella Vista	Peñarol
1998	Clausura	Nacional	Rentistas	River Plate
1999	Apertura	Nacional	Defensor Sporting	Danubio
1999	Clausura	Peñarol	Nacional	Danubio
2000	Apertura	Nacional	Danubio	Defensor Sporting
2000	Clausura	Peñarol	Defensor Sporting	Nacional
2001	Apertura	Danubio	Peñarol	Nacional
2001	Clausura	Nacional	Danubio	Peñarol
2002	Apertura	Nacional	Peñarol	Fénix
2002	Clausura	Danubio	Peñarol	Fénix
2003	Apertura	Nacional	Peñarol	Danubio
2003	Clausura	Peñarol	Liverpool	Fénix
2004	Apertura	Nacional	Defensor Sporting	Danubio
2004	Clausura	Danubio	Defensor Sporting	Nacional
2005–06	Apertura	Rocha	Nacional	Danubio
2005–06	Clausura	Nacional	Defensor Sporting	Danubio
2006–07	Apertura	Danubio	Peñarol	Defensor Sporting
2006–07	Clausura	Danubio	Peñarol	Defensor Sporting
2007–08	Apertura	Defensor Sporting	Danubio	Rampla Juniors
2007–08	Clausura	Peñarol	River Plate	Liverpool
2008–09	Apertura	Nacional	Danubio	Defensor Sporting
2008–09	Clausura	Defensor Sporting	River Plate	Cerro
2009–10	Apertura	Nacional	Liverpool	Defensor Sporting
2009–10	Clausura	Peñarol	Cerro	Fénix
2010–11	Apertura	Defensor Sporting	Nacional	Bella Vista
2010–11	Clausura	Nacional	Defensor Sporting	Peñarol
2011–12	Apertura	Nacional	Danubio	Peñarol
2011–12	Clausura	Defensor Sporting	Nacional	Liverpool
2012–13	Apertura	Peñarol	Defensor Sporting	Nacional
2012–13	Clausura	Defensor Sporting	Peñarol	River Plate
2013–14	Apertura	Danubio	River Plate	Nacional
2013–14	Clausura	Montevideo Wanderers	Peñarol	Nacional
2014–15	Apertura	Nacional	Racing	Peñarol
2014–15	Clausura	Peñarol	River Plate	Defensor Sporting
2015–16	Apertura	Peñarol	Nacional	Cerro
2015–16	Clausura	Plaza Colonia	Peñarol	Sud América
2017	Apertura	Defensor Sporting	Nacional	Peñarol
2017	Clausura	Peñarol	Defensor Sporting	Nacional
2018	Apertura	Nacional	Peñarol	Danubio
2018	Clausura	Peñarol	Nacional	Montevideo Wanderers
2019	Apertura	Peñarol	Fénix	Nacional
2019	Clausura	Nacional	Peñarol	Progreso
2020	Apertura	Rentistas	Nacional	Montevideo City Torque
2020	Clausura	Liverpool	Peñarol	Montevideo City Torque
2021	Apertura	Plaza Colonia	Nacional	Peñarol
2021	Clausura	Peñarol	Nacional	Montevideo Wanderers
2022	Apertura	Liverpool	Nacional	Deportivo Maldonado
2022	Clausura	Nacional	River Plate	Deportivo Maldonado
2023	Apertura	Peñarol	Nacional	Defensor Sporting
2023	Clausura	Liverpool	Peñarol	Racing
2024	Apertura	Peñarol	Nacional	Defensor Sporting
2024	Clausura	Peñarol	Nacional	Racing
2025	Apertura	Liverpool	Nacional	Juventud
2025	Clausura	Peñarol	Nacional	Montevideo City Torque
2026	Apertura	Racing	Deportivo Maldonado	Albion
2026	Clausura	Liverpool	Montevideo City Torque	Nacional

=== Torneo Intermedio ===
Year	Champion	Score	Runner-up	Award
2017	Nacional	1–0	Defensor Sporting	Qualified for 2018 Supercopa Uruguaya
2018	Nacional	3–2	Torque	Qualified for 2019 Supercopa Uruguaya
2019	Liverpool	2–2 (5–4 p)	River Plate	Qualified for 2020 Copa Sudamericana and 2020 Supercopa Uruguaya
2020	Nacional	0–0 (4–1 p)	Montevideo Wanderers	Qualified for 2021 Supercopa Uruguaya
2021	(Not held) (Note: The Torneo Intermedio was not played in 2021 due to schedule constraints caused by the COVID-19 pandemic.)			
2022	Nacional	1–0	Liverpool	Qualified for 2023 Supercopa Uruguaya
2023	Liverpool	1–0	Defensor Sporting	Qualified for 2024 Supercopa Uruguaya
2024	Nacional	1–1 (8–7 p)	Peñarol	Qualified for 2025 Supercopa Uruguaya
2025	Peñarol	0–0 (5–3 p)	Nacional	Qualified for 2026 Supercopa Uruguaya
2026	Peñarol	5–1	Montevideo Wanderers	Qualified for 2027 Supercopa Uruguaya

=== Torneo Clasificatorio ===
Season	Champion	Runner-up	Award
2001	Peñarol	Danubio	Qualified for 2002 Copa Libertadores
2002	Peñarol	Nacional	Qualified for 2003 Copa Libertadores
2004	Danubio	Cerrito	Qualified for 2005 Copa Libertadores

=== Liguilla Pre-Libertadores de América ===
Season	Champion	Runner-up	Award
1974	Peñarol	Montevideo Wanderers	Qualified for 1975 Copa Libertadores
1975	Peñarol	Nacional	Qualified for 1976 Copa Libertadores
1976	Defensor Sporting	Peñarol	Qualified for 1977 Copa Libertadores
1977	Peñarol	Danubio	Qualified for 1978 Copa Libertadores
1978	Peñarol	Nacional	Qualified for 1979 Copa Libertadores
1979	Defensor Sporting	Nacional	Qualified for 1980 Copa Libertadores
1980	Peñarol	Bella Vista	Qualified for 1981 Copa Libertadores
1981	Defensor Sporting	Peñarol	Qualified for 1982 Copa Libertadores
1982	Nacional	Montevideo Wanderers	Qualified for 1983 Copa Libertadores
1983	Danubio	Nacional	Qualified for 1984 Copa Libertadores
1984	Peñarol	Bella Vista	Qualified for 1985 Copa Libertadores
1985	Peñarol	Montevideo Wanderers	Qualified for 1986 Copa Libertadores
1986	Peñarol	Progreso	Qualified for 1987 Copa Libertadores
1987	Montevideo Wanderers	Nacional	Qualified for 1988 Copa Libertadores
1988	Peñarol	Danubio	Qualified for 1989 Copa Libertadores
1989	Defensor Sporting	Progreso	Qualified for 1990 Copa Libertadores
1990	Nacional	Bella Vista	Qualified for 1991 Copa Libertadores
1991	Defensor Sporting	Nacional	Qualified for 1992 Copa Libertadores
1992	Nacional	Bella Vista	Qualified for 1993 Copa Libertadores
1993	Nacional	Defensor Sporting	Qualified for 1994 Copa Libertadores
1994	Peñarol	Cerro	Qualified for 1995 Copa Libertadores
1995	Defensor Sporting	Peñarol	Qualified for 1996 Copa Libertadores
1996	Nacional	Peñarol	Qualified for 1997 Copa Libertadores
1997	Peñarol	Nacional	Qualified for 1998 Copa Libertadores
1998	Bella Vista	Nacional	Qualified for 1999 Copa Libertadores
1999	Nacional	Bella Vista	Qualified for 2000 Copa Libertadores
2000	Defensor Sporting	Peñarol	Qualified for 2001 Copa Libertadores
2001	Montevideo Wanderers	Defensor Sporting	Qualified for 2002 Copa Libertadores
2002	Fénix	Defensor Sporting	Qualified for 2003 Copa Libertadores
2003	Fénix	Danubio	Qualified for 2004 Copa Libertadores
2004	Peñarol	Defensor Sporting	Qualified for 2005 Copa Libertadores
2005	(Not held)		
2005–06	Defensor Sporting	Danubio	Qualified for 2007 Copa Libertadores
2006–07	Nacional	Montevideo Wanderers	Qualified for 2008 Copa Libertadores
2007–08	Nacional	Defensor Sporting	Qualified for 2009 Copa Libertadores
2008–09	Cerro	Racing	Qualified for 2010 Copa Libertadores

== See also ==
- Uruguayan football league system
- Uruguayan championship (FUF)
- Torneo del Consejo Provisorio
- Uruguayan Football Stadiums
- Uruguayan Segunda División
