= 1991 Campeonato Uruguayo Primera División =

88th season of the top-tier football league in Uruguay

Statistics of Primera División Uruguaya for the 1991 season.

== Overview ==
It was contested by 14 teams, and Defensor Sporting won the championship.

== League standings ==
Pos	Team	Pld	W	D	L	GF	GA	GD	Pts
1	Defensor Sporting	26	14	7	5	30	13	+17	35
2	Nacional	26	13	7	6	40	27	+13	33
3	Montevideo Wanderers	26	10	12	4	29	21	+8	32
4	Peñarol	26	10	11	5	27	21	+6	31
5	Danubio	26	11	7	8	28	20	+8	29
6	Central Español	26	8	13	5	24	24	0	29
7	Cerro	26	7	12	7	18	16	+2	26
8	Liverpool	26	6	14	6	25	24	+1	26
9	Huracán Buceo	25	8	6	11	31	37	−6	22
10	Racing Montevideo	26	6	10	10	20	27	−7	22
11	Bella Vista	26	4	14	8	20	31	−11	22
12	Progreso	26	6	9	11	23	31	−8	21
13	Rentistas	26	5	9	12	22	29	−7	19
14	El Tanque Sisley	25	4	7	14	14	30	−16	15

Source: rsssf.com
