= 1986 Campeonato Uruguayo Primera División =

83rd season of the top-tier football league in Uruguay

The 1986 Uruguayan Primera División was the 87th season of the league since its founding. It was contested by 13 teams, with Peñarol winning their 29th title.

== League standings ==
Pos	Team	Pld	W	D	L	GF	GA	GD	Pts	Qualification or relegation
1	Nacional	24	13	9	2	33	15	+18	35	Qualification for Championship playoff
2	Peñarol (C)	24	13	8	3	33	17	+16	34	Qualification for Championship playoff and the 1987 Copa Libertadores Group stage
3	Central Español	24	10	8	6	26	20	+6	28	
4	Montevideo Wanderers	24	7	12	5	32	22	+10	26	
5	Bella Vista	24	9	6	9	25	22	+3	24	
6	Progreso	24	9	6	9	25	25	0	24	Qualification for 1987 Copa Libertadores Group stage
7	Huracán Buceo	24	8	8	8	24	26	−2	24	
8	Defensor Sporting	24	7	8	9	28	31	−3	22	
9	Danubio	24	7	8	9	26	30	−4	22	
10	Cerro	24	6	8	10	22	28	−6	20	
11	Rampla Juniors	24	6	7	11	20	30	−10	19	
12	Fénix (R)	24	2	14	8	19	29	−10	18	Relegation to 1987 Uruguayan Segunda División
13	River Plate	24	4	8	12	21	39	−18	16	

Source: RSSSF
Rules for classification: 1) points; 2) goal difference; 3) number of goals scored.
(C) Champions; (R) Relegated

== Championship playoff ==
Peñarol	0 – 0 (a.e.t.)	Nacional
Penalties
	4 – 3
