= Carlos Scarone =

Uruguayan footballer (1888–1965)

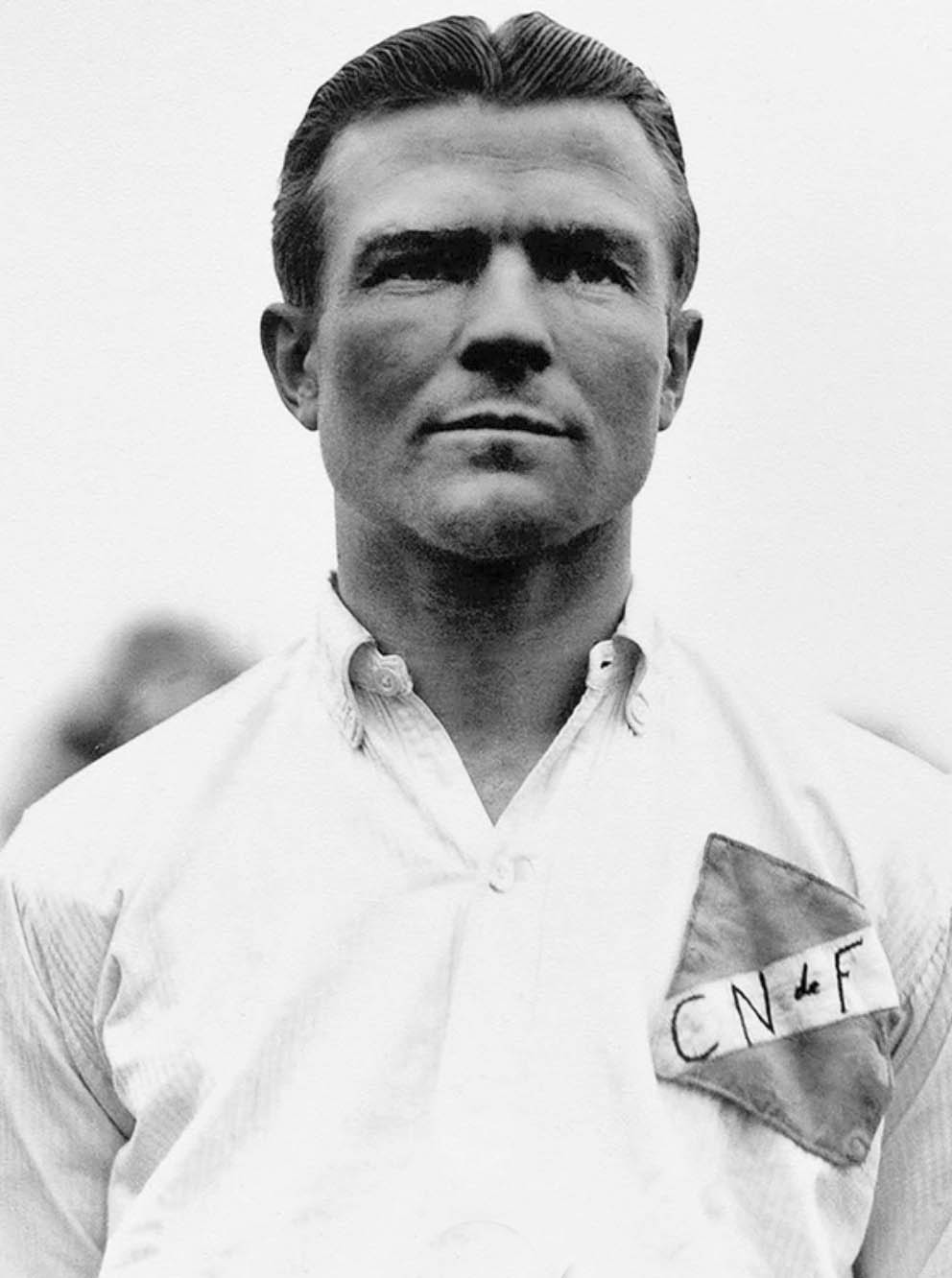
- Scarone in Nacional

Personal information
- Date of birth: 10 November 1888
- Date of death: 12 May 1965 (aged 76)
- Position: Forward

Senior career*
Years	Team	Apps	(Gls)
1908	River Plate FC		
1909–11	CURCC		
1912	Racing		
1913	Boca Juniors		
1914–1927	Nacional		

International career
1909–1922	Uruguay	25	(17)
- * Club domestic league appearances and goals

Carlos Scarone (10 November 1888 – 12 May 1965) was a Uruguayan footballer who played as forward. Despite he played in several clubs of Argentina and Uruguay, Scarone is mostly known for his tenure on Nacional, where he stayed nine years, scoring 152 goals in 227 matches played.

At club level, Scarone won a total of 23 titles (all of them with Nacional), 17 domestic league and cups and 6 international cups.

At international level, Scarone played in 25 matches for the Uruguay national football team from 1909 to 1922. He was also part of Uruguay's squad in three Copa América (then, "South American Championship") in 1917, 1919, and 1920, also winning two titles.

After retiring from football, Scarone became manager of Nacional in 1932. He was brother of another notable player of Nacional, Héctor Scarone.

== Titles ==
CURCC

- Primera División (1): 1911

Nacional

- Primera División (8): 1915, 1916, 1917, 1919, 1920, 1922, 1923, 1924
- Copa Competencia (5): 1914, 1915, 1919, 1921, 1923
- Copa Honor (4): 1914, 1915, 1916, 1917
- Tie Cup (1): 1915
- Copa de Honor Cousenier (3): 1915, 1916, 1917
- Copa Aldao (2): 1919, 1920

Uruguay national team

- Copa América (2): 1919, 1920
