= 1917 Copa de Honor Cousenier =

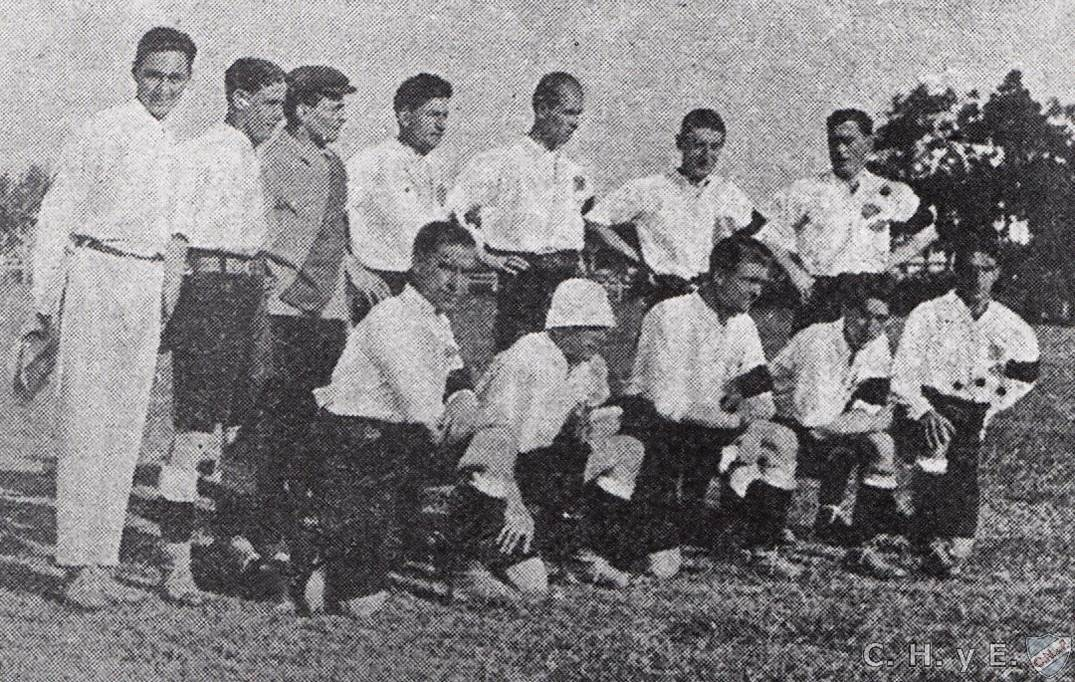
- Team of Nacional, winners
- Event: Copa de Honor Cousenier
Nacional	Racing Club
(Uruguay)	(Argentina)
3	1
- Date: 21 April 1918
- Venue: Parque Pereira, Montevideo
- Referee: A. Saralegui (Uruguay)

The 1917 Copa de Honor Cousenier was the final match to decide the winner of the Copa de Honor Cousenier, the 12th edition of the international competition organised by the Argentine and Uruguayan Associations together. The final was contested by Uruguayan Club Nacional de Football and Argentine Racing Club.

The match was held in Parque Pereira stadium in Montevideo, on April 21, 1918. Nacional beat Racing 3–1, winning its fourth and last Copa Cousenier trophy over five finals contested.

== Qualified teams ==
Team	Qualification	Previous final app.
(Uruguay) Nacional	1917 Copa Honor (U) champion	**1905**, 1906, 1913, **1915, 1916**
(Argentina) Racing	1917 Copa Honor MCBA champion	1912, **1913**, 1915

Note

- **Bold** indicates winning years

== Match details ==
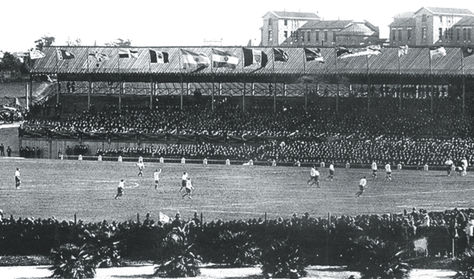
Parque Pereira, venue (left) and some moments of the match
1917 Copa de Honor Cousenier
April 21, 1918

Nacional (Uruguay)	3–1	(Argentina) Racing Club
Romano 10', 59', 66'	Report	Vivaldo 44'

Parque Pereira, Montevideo
Referee: A. Saralegui (Uruguay)

**Nacional**	**Racing**

GK	(Uruguay) Santiago Demarchi
DF	(Uruguay) Antonio Urdinarán
DF	(Uruguay) Alfredo Foglino
MF	(Uruguay) Pedro Olivieri
MF	(Uruguay) Alfredo Zibecchi
MF	(Uruguay) José Vanzino
FW	(Uruguay) José Brachi
FW	(Uruguay) Rodolfo Marán
FW	(Uruguay) Ángel Romano
FW	(Uruguay) Carlos Scarone
FW	(Uruguay) Pascual Somma

GK	(Argentina) Marcos Croce
DF	(Argentina) Roberto Castagnola
DF	(Argentina) Armando Reyes
MF	(Argentina) Alberto Ohaco
MF	(Argentina) Francisco Olazar
MF	(Argentina) Ricardo Pepe
FW	(Argentina) Natalio Perinetti
FW	(Argentina) Nicolás Vivaldo
FW	(Argentina) Alberto Marcovecchio
FW	(Argentina) Juan Hospital
FW	(Argentina) Juan Perinetti
