= José Piendibene =

Uruguayan footballer (1890-1969)

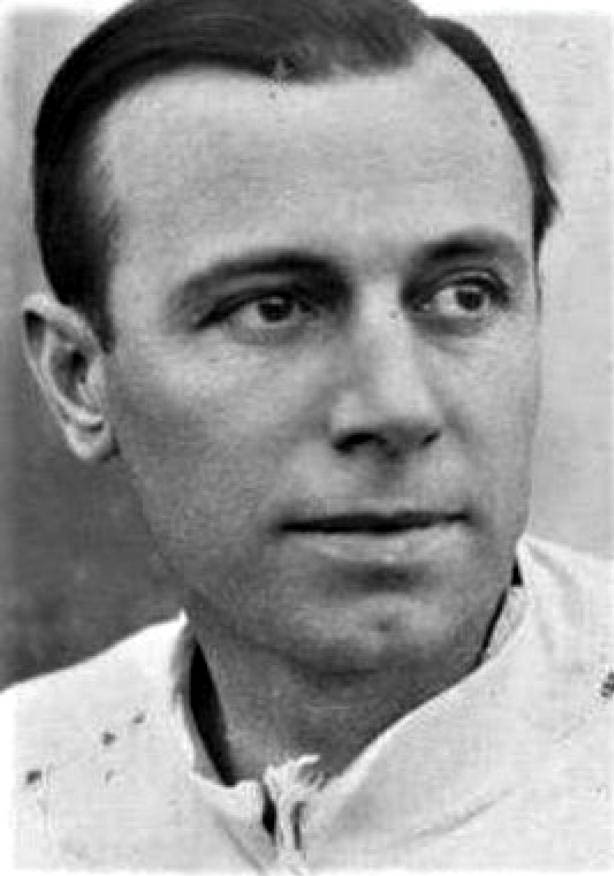

Personal information
- Full name: José Miguel Piendibene Ferrari
- Date of birth: 5 June 1890
- Date of death: 12 November 1969 (aged 79)
- Position: Forward

Senior career*
Years	Team	Apps	(Gls)
1908–1928	Peñarol	506	(253)

International career
1909–1922	Uruguay	43	(22)

Managerial career
- 1934: Peñarol
- 1940–1941: Peñarol
Medal record
Men's football
Representing Uruguay
South American Championship
Winner	1916 Argentina
Winner	1917 Uruguay
Winner	1920 Chile
Third place	1921 Argentina
- * Club domestic league appearances and goals

José Miguel Piendibene Ferrari (5 June 1890 – 12 November 1969) was a Uruguayan footballer. His position on the field was centre forward, being regarded by many as one of the best Uruguayan football players of all time.

Piendibene was praised by the media as the best Uruguayan player of his time, highlighting his dribbling skills, passing and efficiency as scorer. Piendibene spent his entire career in Peñarol where he won 11 titles with the club.

== Playing career ==
=== Club career ===
Piendibene played for Peñarol between 1908 and 1928. During his time with the Carboneros he won a total of 11 titles, including four Primera División championships, two national cups and five international cups. He played a total of 506 matches, scoring 253 goals. Piendibene also holds a record of most Uruguayan derby played with 62 matches, having scored 21 goals. In 1924, Peñarol declared him "honorary member" of the club. When Peñarol celebrated its 50th anniversary in 1941, Piendibene was the flag bearer.

=== International career ===
Piendibene made his debut for the Uruguay national football team in 1909 against Argentina in Buenos Aires. Over the course of his 14-year career with the national team, he was capped 40 times, scoring 20 goals. He made his final appearance for La Celeste in November 1923.

Piendibene played two matches at the unofficial 1910 Copa America.

At the 1916 South American Championship Piendibene scored the first goal of the tournament in a match against Chile. He finished the tournament with two goals and was equal second place in the goalscorers list.

Piendibene was a member of the Uruguayan squad for the 1917 South American Championship but did not play a match at the tournament.

He was a member of Uruguay's third South American Championship win at the 1920 tournament where he scored one goal in three matches.

He played in the Uruguay team at the 1921 tournament where Uruguay placed third. Piendibene scored one goal.

After Piendibene retired from football, he had two brief periods as coach of Peñarol, in 1934 and 1940–41.

== Honours ==
=== Club ===
Peñarol

- Uruguayan Primera División (4): 1911, 1918, 1921, 1928
- Copa de Competencia (1): 1916
- Copa de Honor (1): 1918
- Tie Cup (1): 1916
- Copa de Honor Cousenier (3): 1909, 1911, 1918
- Copa Aldao (1): 1928

Uruguay

- Copa América (3): 1916, 1917, 1920
- Copa Lipton (2): 1910, 1911
- Copa Newton (4): 1912, 1915, 1919, 1920
- Copa Premier Honor Argentino (2): 1910, 1912
- Copa Premier Honor Uruguayo (5): 1911, 1912, 1914, 1918, 1920

== See also ==
- List of one-club men in association football
