= 1916 Copa de Honor Cousenier =

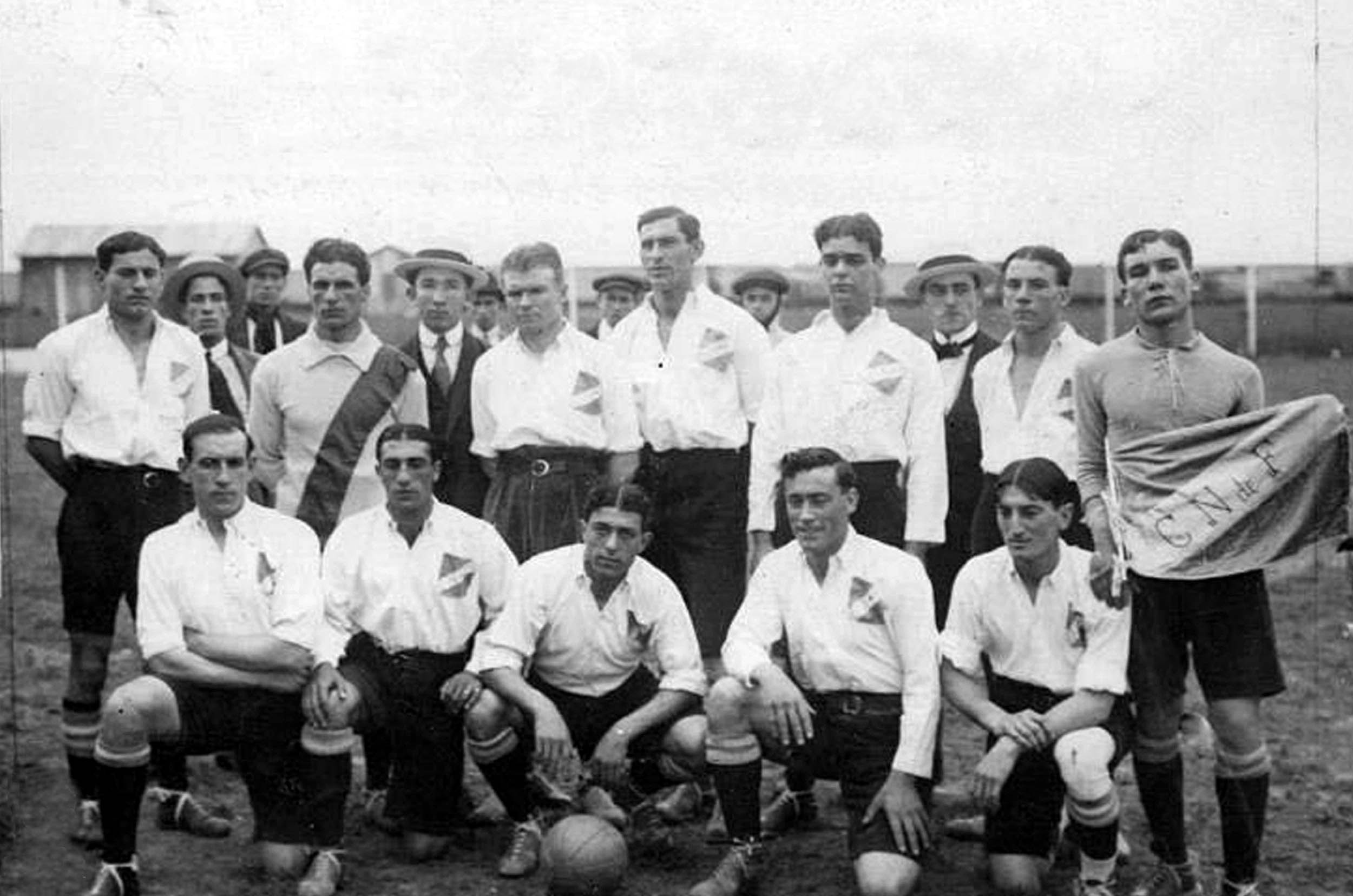
- A Nacional team of 1916
- Event: Copa de Honor Cousenier
Nacional	Rosario Central
(Uruguay)	(Argentina)
6	1
- Date: December 10, 1916
- Venue: Parque Central, Montevideo
- Referee: J. Bartolossi

The 1916 Copa de Honor Cousenier was the final match to decide the winner of the Copa de Honor Cousenier, the 11th. edition of the international competition organised by the Argentine and Uruguayan Associations together. The final was contested by Uruguayan Club Nacional de Football and Argentine Rosario Central.

The match was held in the Estadio Gran Parque Central in Montevideo, on December 10, 1916. Nacional beat Rosario Central with a conclusive 6–1, winning its third Copa Cousenier trophy

== Qualified teams ==
Team	Qualification	Previous final app.
(Uruguay) Nacional	1916 Copa Honor (U) champion	**1905**, 1906, 1913, **1915**
(Argentina) Rosario Central	1916 Copa Honor MCBA champion	(none)

Note

- **Bold** indicates winning years

== Venue ==
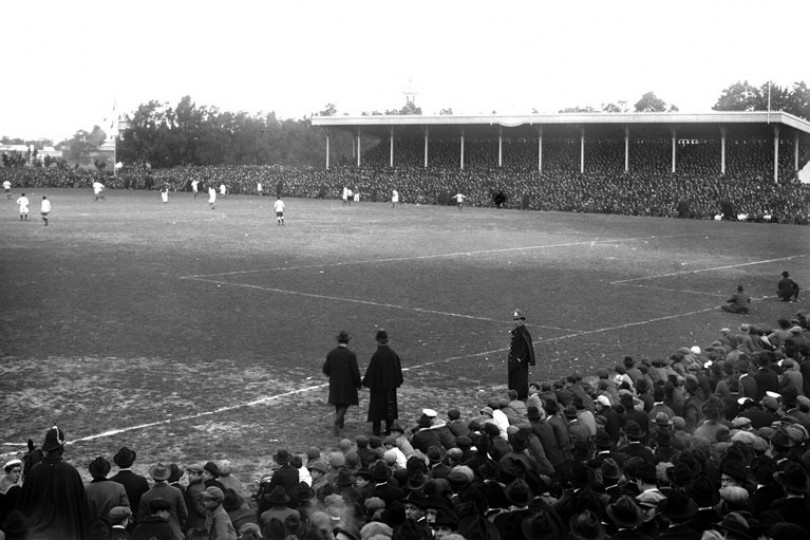
Parque Central, venue

== Match details ==
1916 Copa de Honor Cousenier
December 10, 1916

Nacional (Uruguay)	6–1	(Argentina) Rosario Central
C. Scarone 26', 55'; Romano 43', 44', 49'; H. Scarone 87'	Report	E. Hayes 38'

Parque Central, Montevideo
Referee: J. Bartolossi

**Nacional**	**Rosario Central**

GK	(Uruguay) Santiago Demarchi
DF	(Uruguay) Ramón Pesquera
DF	(Uruguay) Alfredo Foglino
MF	(Uruguay) Orestes Del Cioppo
MF	(Uruguay) Abdón Porte
MF	(Uruguay) José Vanzino
FW	(Uruguay) José Brachi
FW	(Uruguay) Héctor Scarone
FW	(Uruguay) Ángel Romano
FW	(Uruguay) Carlos Scarone
FW	(Uruguay) Pascual Somma

GK	(Argentina) Guillermo Atsbury
DF	(Argentina) Zenón Díaz
DF	(Argentina) Ignacio Rotta
MF	(Argentina) Ernesto Rigotti
MF	(Argentina) Ernesto Blanco
MF	(Argentina) Jacinto Perazzo
FW	(Argentina) Antonio Blanco
FW	(Argentina) José Laoilo
FW	(Argentina) Juan Enrique Hayes
FW	(Argentina) Ennis Hayes
FW	(Argentina) Alfredo Woodward
