= John Harley (footballer) =

Uruguayan footballer (1886-1960)

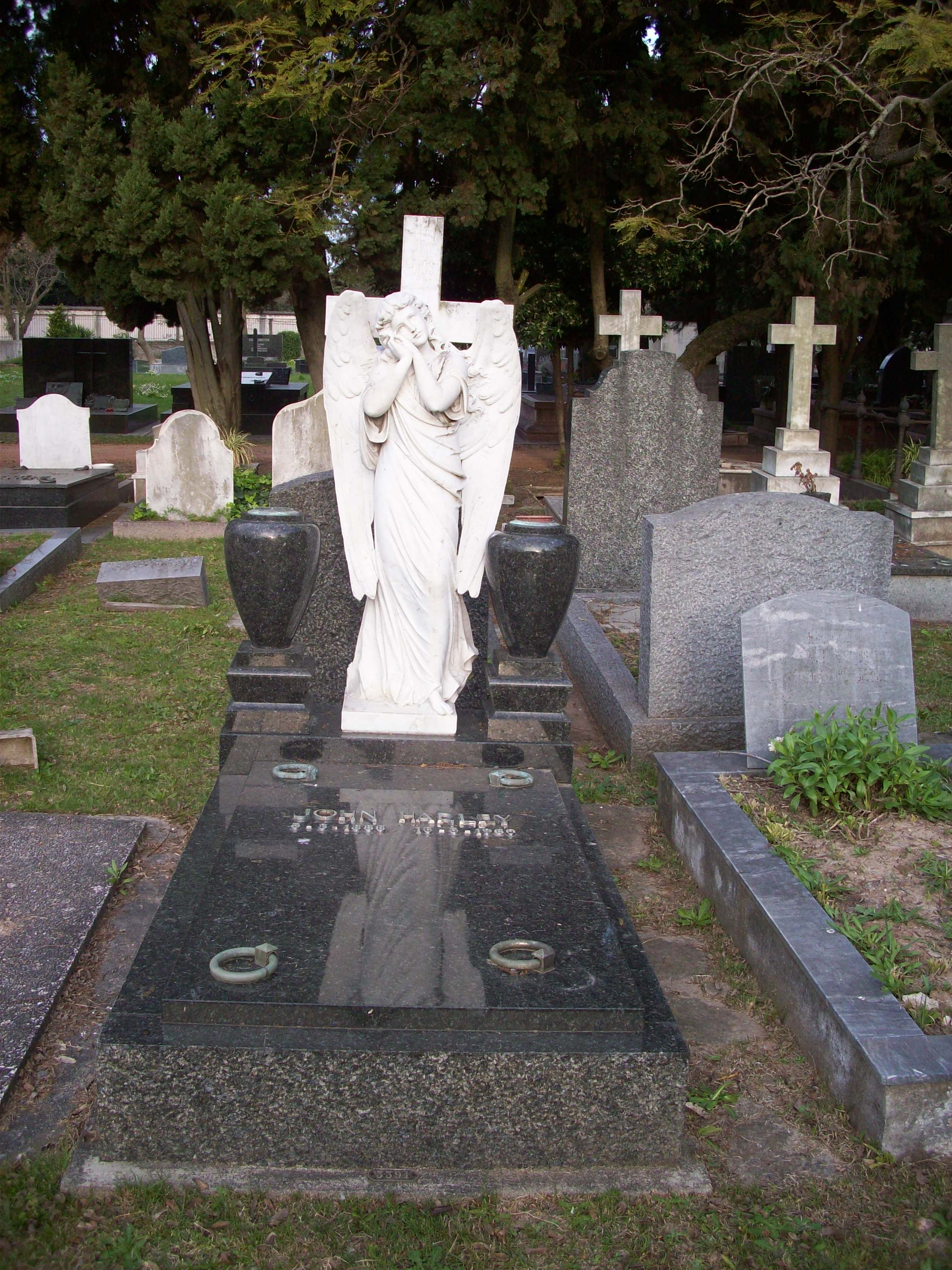
- Harley's grave at the Montevideo British Cemetery.

Personal information
- Date of birth: 5 March 1886
- Place of birth: Glasgow, Scotland
- Date of death: 15 May 1960 (aged 74)
- Place of death: Montevideo, Uruguay

Senior career*
Years	Team	Apps	(Gls)
1906–1908	Ferro Carril Oeste		
1909–1920	Peñarol		

International career
1909–1916	Uruguay	22	(0)

Managerial career
- 1909–1910: Uruguay
- Peñarol
- 1942: Peñarol
- * Club domestic league appearances and goals

John Harley (also known as Juan Harley; 5 March 1886 – 15 May 1960) was a Uruguay international footballer of Scottish background.

== Early life ==
Harley was born in Glasgow, Scotland in 1886 and was raised in Cathcart. By 1906 he had become a railway engineer working in Springburn, near Glasgow. In that year he moved to South America to work on railways along the Río de la Plata. Initially he worked in Argentina where he worked for the Bahía Blanca and North Western Railway and the Buenos Aires Western Railway.

On arriving in Uruguay in 1909 Harley worked for the Central Uruguay Railway. He worked for the railway for 37 years until his retirement.

== Playing career ==
=== Club career ===
In Argentina Harley played for Ferro Carril Oeste before being recruited by Uruguayan club Central Uruguay Railway Cricket Club (later Peñarol). Harley was spotted by C.U.R.C.C. when they played a friendly match against Ferro Carril Oeste in 1908.

Harley played with C.U.R.C.C./Peñarol from 1909 until his retirement from football in 1920. He captained C.U.R.C.C./Peñarol for ten seasons.

=== International career ===
Harley played his first match for Uruguay in September 1909. He played the last of his 17 matches for the national team in October 1916.

== Management career ==
Harley acted as a player/manager of the Uruguay national team from 1909 until at least 1910.

After retiring as a player Harley managed Peñarol.

== Legacy ==
Harley's time with Peñarol as a player and manager is considered significant for the fact that he changed the Uruguayan style of football from a focus on long ball to a game that featured short passing. This style of play is considered to have contributed to Peñarol and Uruguay achieving significant success up to the 1920s.

== Later life and death ==
In 1951 Harley was honoured with a match between Peñarol and Rampla Juniors at the Estadio Centenario. Over 40,000 spectators, including many former colleagues and members of successful Uruguayan teams, turned out to honour Harley's contribution to Uruguayan football.

Harley died in 1960 in Uruguay, and was buried in The British Cemetery in Montevideo.

== Honours ==
CURCC / Peñarol

- Primera División: 1911, 1918
- Copa de Competencia: 1909, 1910, 1916
- Copa de Honor Cousenier: 1909, 1911
- Tie Cup: 1916

Uruguay national team

- Copa Newton: 1913, 1915
- Copa Argentino: 1910
- Copa Uruguayo: 1911, 1913, 1914
