= 1909 Copa de Honor Cousenier =

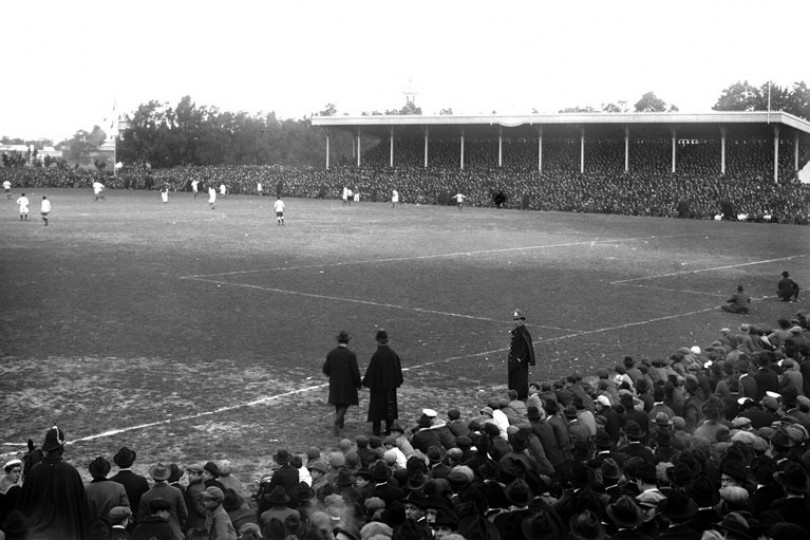
- Parque Central, venue of the final
- Event: Copa de Honor Cousenier
CURCC	San Isidro
(Uruguay)	(Argentina)
4	2
- Date: October 17, 1909
- Venue: Parque Central, Montevideo
- Referee: Dall'Orto

The 1909 Copa de Honor Cousenier was the final match to decide the winner of the Copa de Honor Cousenier, the 5th. edition of the international competition organised by the Argentine and Uruguayan Associations together. The final was contested by Uruguayan side CURCC and Argentine club San Isidro.

The match was held in the Estadio Gran Parque Central in Montevideo, on October 17, 1909. CURCC beat San Isidro 4–2, winning its first Copa Cousenier trophy.

== Qualified teams ==
Team	Qualification	Previous final app.
(Uruguay) CURCC	1908 Copa Honor (U) champion	1907
(Argentina) San Isidro	1908 Copa Honor MCBA champion	(none)

Note

- **Bold** indicates winning years

== Match details ==
1909 Copa de Honor Cousenier
October 17, 1909

CURCC (Uruguay)	4–2	(Argentina) San Isidro
V. Legorburo 25'; A. Manito 32'; C. Scarone 42'; J. Piendibene 44'	Report	J. Gil 57', 84'

Parque Central, Montevideo
Referee: Héctor Dall'Orto

**CURCC**	**San Isidro**

GK	(England) Leonard Crossley
DF	(Uruguay) Juan Laguzzi
DF	(Uruguay) Alfredo Betucci
MF	(Uruguay) Jorge Barbero
MF	(Scotland) (Uruguay) John Harley
MF	(Uruguay) Guillermo Manito
FW	(Uruguay) José Piendibene
FW	(Uruguay) Víctor Legorburo
FW	(Uruguay) Agustín Manito
FW	(Uruguay) Carlos Scarone
FW	(Uruguay) Pedro Zibechi

GK	(Argentina) Carlos Wilson
DF	J. Weiss
DF	(Argentina) S. Gallino
MF	E. Davies
MF	M. Lestrade
MF	A. Vernet Amadeo
FW	(Argentina) L. Burgos
FW	(Argentina) J. Rossi
FW	(Argentina) J. Gil
FW	E. Rothschild
FW	(Argentina) R. Malbrán
