= 1915 Copa de Honor Cousenier =

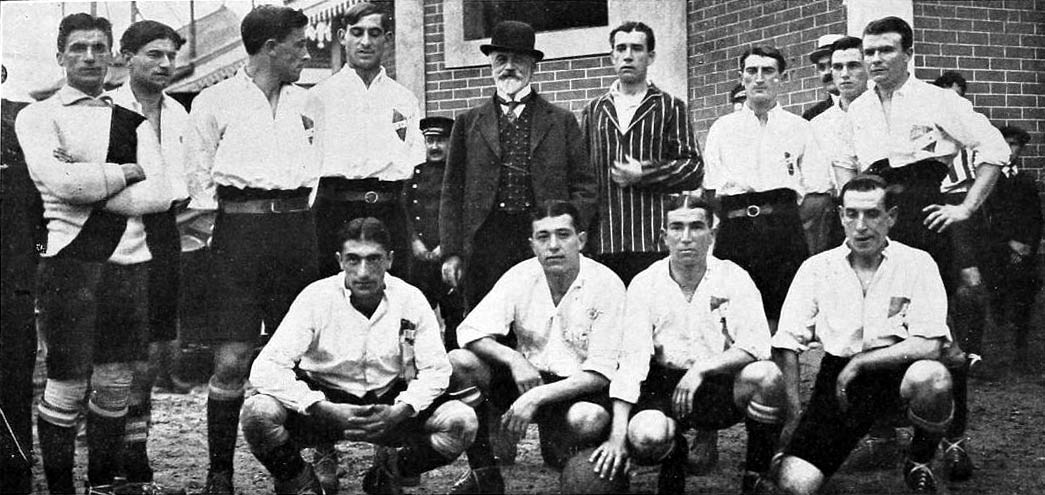
- A Nacional team of 1915
- Event: Copa de Honor Cousenier
Nacional	Racing
(Uruguay)	(Argentina)
2	0
- Date: November 14, 1915
- Venue: Parque Central, Montevideo
- Referee: Apeles Bordabehere (Uruguay)

The 1915 Copa de Honor Cousenier was the final match to decide the winner of the Copa de Honor Cousenier, the 10th. edition of the international competition organised by the Argentine and Uruguayan Associations together. The final was contested by Uruguayan Club Nacional de Football and Argentine Racing Club de Avellaneda.

The match was held in the Estadio Gran Parque Central in Montevideo, on November 14, 1915. Nacional beat Racing 3–2, winning its third Copa Cousenier trophy. (Note: In 1914 no Argentine club contested the final so Nacional played against arch-rival Peñarol, winning 1–0.)

== Qualified teams ==
Team	Qualification	Previous final app.
(Uruguay) Nacional	1915 Copa Honor (U) champion	**1905**, 1906, 1913
(Argentina) Racing Club	1915 Copa Honor MCBA champion	1912, **1913**

Note

- **Bold** indicates winning years

== Venue ==
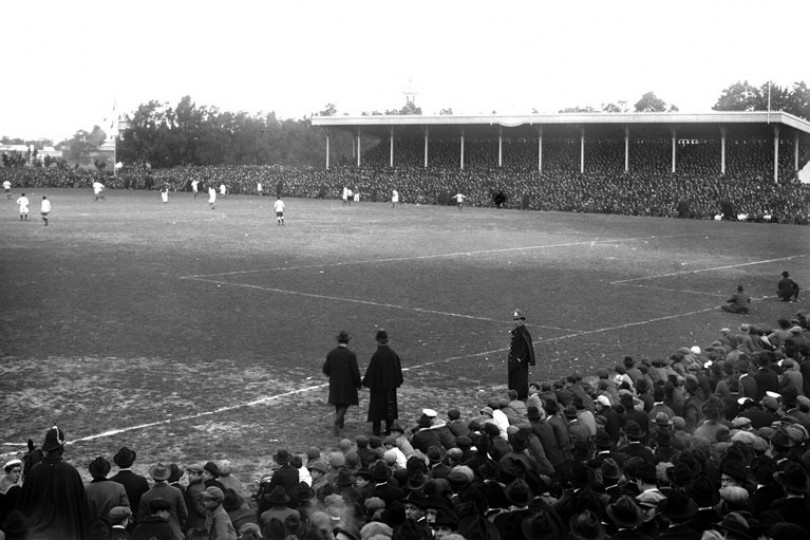
Parque Central, venue

== Match details ==
1915 Copa de Honor Cousenier
November 14, 1915

Nacional (Uruguay)	2–0	(Argentina) Racing Club
Dacal 79'; Romano 86'	Report

Parque Central, Montevideo
Referee: Apeles Bordabehere (Uruguay)

**Nacional**	**Racing**

GK	(Uruguay) Santiago Demarchi
DF	(Uruguay) Francisco Castellino
DF	(Uruguay) Alfredo Foglino
MF	(Uruguay) Pedro Olivieri
MF	(Uruguay) Abdón Porte
MF	(Uruguay) José Vanzino
FW	(Uruguay) Pascual Somma
FW	(Uruguay) Pablo Dacal
FW	(Uruguay) Ángel Romano
FW	(Uruguay) Carlos Scarone
FW	(Uruguay) José Brachi

GK	(Argentina) Syla Arduino
DF	(Argentina) Armando Reyes
DF	(Argentina) Saturnino Ochoa
MF	(Argentina) Ricardo Pepe
MF	(Argentina) Francisco Olazar
MF	(Argentina) Ángel Betular
FW	(Uruguay) Zoilo Canavery
FW	(Argentina) Juan Hospital
FW	(Argentina) Alberto Ohaco
FW	(Argentina) Carlos Comaschi
FW	(Argentina) Juan Perinetti
