= 1911 Copa de Honor Cousenier =

- Team of CURCC, champions
- Event: Copa de Honor Cousenier
CURCC	Newell's O.B.
(Uruguay)	(Argentina)
2	0
- Suspended on 65' when Newell's left the field but the title was awarded to CURCC anyway
- Date: 5 November 1911
- Venue: Parque Central, Montevideo

The 1911 Copa de Honor Cousenier was the final match to decide the winner of the Copa de Honor Cousenier, the 7th. edition of the international competition organised by the Argentine and Uruguayan Associations together. The final was contested by Uruguayan side CURCC and Argentine club Newell's Old Boys.

The match was held in the Estadio Gran Parque Central in Montevideo, on November 5, 1911. With CURCC winning 2–0, players of Newell's left the field under protest after the referee validated both goals. Newell's alleged that those goals had been scored with players in offside position. Nevertheless, the title was awarded to CURCC, which won its second consecutive Copa Cousenier trophy.

== Qualified teams ==
Team	Qualification	Previous final app.
(Uruguay) CURCC	1911 Copa Honor (U) champions	1907, **1909**
(Argentina) Newell's Old Boys	1911 Copa Honor MCBA champions	(none)

Note

- **Bold** indicates winning years

== Match details ==
Team of Newell's (left) and some moments of the match at Parque Central
1911 Copa de Honor Cousenier
November 5, 1911

CURCC (Uruguay)	2–0	(Argentina) Newell's Old Boys
Felipe Canavessi 12', 63'	Report

Parque Central, Montevideo

**CURCC**	**Newell's**

GK	(Uruguay) Luis Solans
DF	(Uruguay) Carlos Ronzoni
DF	(Uruguay) Eleuterio Pintos
MF	(Uruguay) Ceferino Camacho
MF	(Scotland) (Uruguay) John Harley
MF	(Uruguay) Guillermo Manito
FW	(Uruguay) Alfredo Betucci
FW	(Uruguay) Luis Quaglia
FW	(Uruguay) José Piendibene
FW	(Uruguay) Felipe Canavessi
FW	(Uruguay) Ángel Romano

GK	(Argentina) José Hiriart
DF	(Argentina) Tomás Hamblin
DF	(Argentina) Rafael Bordabehere
MF	(Argentina) Martín Redín
MF	(Argentina) Caraciolo González
MF	(Argentina) Antonio Torelli
FW	(England) C.K. Hollamby
FW	(Argentina) Manuel González
FW	(Argentina) Faustino González
FW	(Argentina) Hugo Mallet
FW	(Argentina) José Viale
