= Rodolfo Marán =

Uruguayan footballer

Personal information
- Full name: Rodolfo Marán Rosendo
- Date of birth: 24 May 1897
- Place of birth: Montevideo
- Position: Forward

Senior career*
Years	Team	Apps	(Gls)
1917–1926	Nacional		

International career
1916–1923	Uruguay	14	(0)
Medal record
Men's football
Representing Uruguay
South American Championship
Winner	1916 Argentina
Winner	1917 Uruguay
Runner-up	1919 Brazil
Third place	1922 Brazil
- * Club domestic league appearances and goals

Rodolfo Marán Rosendo (born 24 May 1897, date of death unknown) was a Uruguayan footballer. He played in eight matches for the Uruguay national football team from 1916 to 1923. He was also part of Uruguay's squad for the 1916 South American Championship.

== Honours ==
Nacional

- Primera División: 1917, 1919, 1920, 1922, 1923, 1924

Uruguay

- South American Championship: 1916, 1917
