= Copa de Honor =

Copa de Honor may refer to the following football competitions:

- Copa de Honor (Uruguay), Uruguayan football competition organized by the Uruguayan Football Association from 1905 to 1920
- Copa de Honor Cousenier, international football club competition which was played 13 times between representatives of the Argentina and Uruguay associations between 1905 and 1920
- Copa de Honor Municipalidad de Buenos Aires, Argentine official football cup competition. It was contested fourteen times between 1905 and 1920
