= 1913 Copa de Honor Cousenier =

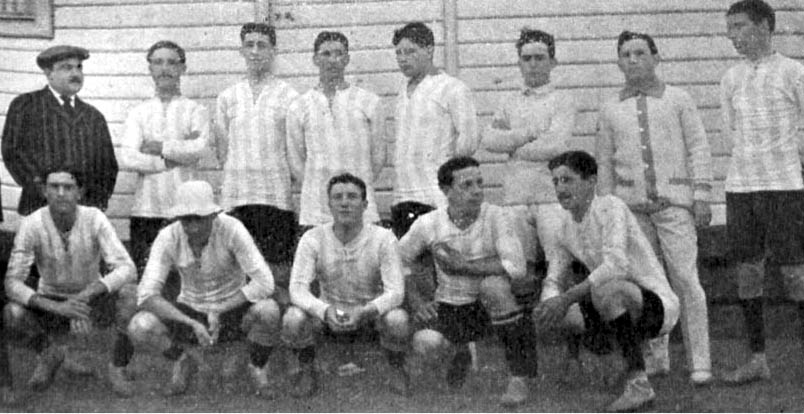
- A Racing Club team of 1913
- Event: Copa de Honor Cousenier
Nacional	Racing
(Uruguay)	(Argentina)
1	1
- Date: November 16, 1913
- Venue: Parque Central, Montevideo
- Referee: Hugo Gondra (Argentina)

Playoff
- Event: Copa de Honor Cousenier
Nacional	Racing
(Uruguay)	(Argentina)
2	3
- Date: December 8, 1913
- Venue: Parque Central, Montevideo
- Referee: Hugo Gondra (Argentina)

The 1913 Copa de Honor Cousenier was the final match to decide the winner of the Copa de Honor Cousenier, the 9th. edition of the international competition organised by the Argentine and Uruguayan Associations together. The final was contested by Uruguayan Club Nacional de Football and Argentine Racing Club de Avellaneda.

The match was held in the Estadio Gran Parque Central in Montevideo, on November 16, 1913. As the match ended in a 2–2 tie, both association scheduled a playoff for December 8 in the same venue, where Racing beat Nacional 3–2, winning its first and only Copa Cousenier trophy.

== Qualified teams ==
Team	Qualification	Previous final app.
(Uruguay) Nacional	1913 Copa Honor (U) champion	**1905**, 1906
(Argentina) Racing Club	1913 Copa Honor MCBA champion	1912

Note

- **Bold** indicates winning years

== Venue ==
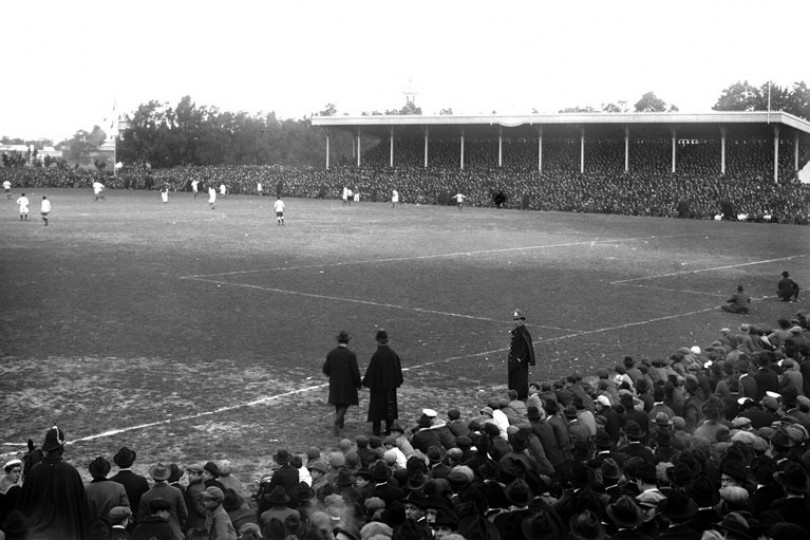
Parque Central, venue of both matches

== Match details ==
=== Final ===
1913 Copa de Honor Cousenier
November 16, 1913
Final

Nacional (Uruguay)	1–1 (a.e.t.)	(Argentina) Racing Club
Vallarino	Report	Hospital

Parque Central, Montevideo
Referee: Hugo Gondra (Argentina)

=== Playoff ===
December 8, 1913
Playoff

Nacional (Uruguay)	2–3 (a.e.t.)	(Argentina) Racing Club
Gorla 65'; Beheregaray 89'	Report	Marcovecchio 23', 130'; Hospital 24'

Parque Central, Montevideo
Attendance: Hugo Gondra (Argentina)

**Nacional**	**Racing**

GK	(Uruguay) Santiago Demarchi
DF	(Uruguay) Francisco Castellino
DF	(Uruguay) Fuggini
MF	(Uruguay) Ángel Landoni
MF	(Uruguay) Abdón Porte
MF	(Uruguay) José Vanzino
FW	(Uruguay) Martín Lázaro
FW	(Uruguay) Beheregaray
FW	(Uruguay) Gorla
FW	(Uruguay) Villarino
FW	(Uruguay) José M. Seoane

GK	(Argentina) Carlos Muttoni
DF	(Argentina) Armando Reyes
DF	(Argentina) Saturnino Ochoa
MF	(Argentina) Ricardo Pepe
MF	(Argentina) Francisco Olazar
MF	(Argentina) Ángel Betular
FW	(Argentina) Juan Viazzi
FW	(Argentina) Juan Hospital
FW	(Argentina) Alberto Marcovecchio
FW	(Argentina) Alberto Ohaco
FW	(Argentina) Juan Perinetti
