= 1918 Copa de Honor Cousenier =

- Peñarol, champions
- Event: Copa de Honor Cousenier
| Peñarol | Independiente |
| (Uruguay) | (Argentina) |
| 4 | 0 |
- Date: 1 December 1918
- Venue: Parque Pereira, Montevideo
- Referee: Marticorena (Uruguay)

The 1918 Copa de Honor Cousenier was the final match to decide the winner of the Copa de Honor Cousenier, the 13th. edition of the international competition organised by the Argentine and Uruguayan Associations together. The final was contested by Uruguayan club Peñarol and Argentine Club Atlético Independiente.

The match was held in Parque Pereira stadium in Montevideo, on December 1, 1918. Peñarol defeated Independiente 4–0, winning its first Copa Cousenier trophy. (Note: With Peñarol being recognised as a CURCC's continuity by FIFA, the club included the championships won by CURCC in its own honours. Controversy exists on the date of the founding of C.A. Peñarol. The club's official position assumes a change of name of CURCC (founded on December 28, 1891). On the other hand, some historians state that "C.A. Peñarol" was established on December 13, 1913.)

== Qualified teams ==
| Team | Qualification | Previous final app. |
|---|---|---|
| (Uruguay) Peñarol | 1918 Copa Honor (U) champion | (none) |
| (Argentina) Independiente | 1918 Copa Honor MCBA champion | (none) |

Note

- **Bold** indicates winning years

== Match details ==
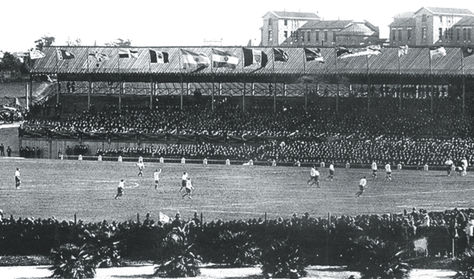
Parque Pereira, venue (left) and a moment of the match
1918 Copa de Honor Cousenier
December 1, 1918

| Peñarol (Uruguay) | 4–0 | (Argentina) Independiente |
|---|---|---|
| Pérez 7'; Artigas 55'; Ferrero 86', 88' | Report |

Parque Pereira, Montevideo
Referee: Marticorena (Uruguay)

| **Peñarol** | **Independiente** |

| GK | (Uruguay) Roberto Chery |
| DF | (Uruguay) José Benincasa |
| DF | (Uruguay) Ernesto Raffo |
| MF | (Uruguay) Jorge Pacheco |
| MF | (Uruguay) Juan Delgado |
| MF | (Uruguay) Pascual Ruotta |
| FW | (Uruguay) José Pérez |
| FW | (Uruguay) Armando Artigas |
| FW | (Uruguay) Guillermo Ángel Ferrero |
| FW | (Uruguay) Isabelino Gradín |
| FW | (Uruguay) Antonio Campolo |

| GK | (Argentina) Pedro Isusi |
| DF | (Argentina) Antonio Ferro |
| DF | (Argentina) Roberto Sande |
| MF | (Argentina) P. Mazzuco |
| MF | (Argentina) Ernesto Sande |
| MF | (Argentina) Juan Cánepa |
| FW | (Uruguay) Zoilo Canavery |
| FW | (Argentina) Pascual Garré |
| FW | (Argentina) Guillermo Ronzoni |
| FW | (Argentina) Vicente Soro |
| FW | (Argentina) Gualberto Galeano |
