= Abdón Porte =

Uruguayan footballer (1893-1918)

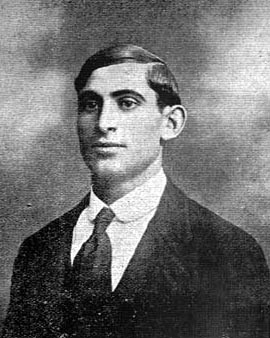

Personal information
- Date of birth: 1893
- Place of birth: Libertad, Durazno Department, Uruguay
- Date of death: 5 March 1918 (aged 24–25)
- Place of death: Montevideo, Uruguay
- Position: Midfielder

Senior career*
Years	Team	Apps	(Gls)
1910	Colón		
1911	Libertad		
1911–1918	Nacional	207	

International career
1913–1917	Uruguay	3	(1)
Medal record
Men's football
Representing Uruguay
South American Championship
Winner	1917 Uruguay
- * Club domestic league appearances and goals

Abdón Porte (1893 – 5 March 1918) was a Uruguayan footballer who played as defensive midfielder. Nicknamed El Indio he won many titles with his club Nacional, and also a Copa América with the Uruguay national team. He committed suicide on 5 March 1918, by shooting himself in the center of the field at Estadio Gran Parque Central, an incident still remembered by the sport community of Uruguay.

== Club career ==
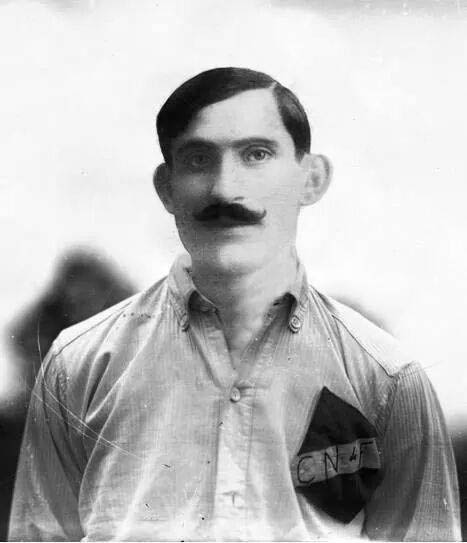
Porte with the Nacional jersey

Porte arrived in Montevideo in 1908, where he played for Colón, then moving to defunct club Libertad. He was later transferred to Nacional, debuting on 12 March 1911, v. Dublin F.C. Porte played as a right back.

Playing for Nacional, Porte gained notability being also team's captain. He was defined as a fierce midfielder and good at stopping rival players and heading the ball. He played a total of 207 games for Nacional, winning 19 titles with the club.

Porte was cited by writer Xosé de Enríquez in his book Hacia el Campo van los Albos:

(Porte) was a typical defensive man of combative style: tenacious, centre-back of a brilliant period of Uruguayan football. Abdón Porte was notable, with well-known defensive and collaborative extraordinary virtues that will be remembered for a long time by older fans. He was a good guy, "friend of his friends"; gauchazo for doing good. Calm on the field although rivals kick him until he breaks.

— Luis Scapinachis

Porte would play his last match v. Charley F.C. (Nacional won by 3–1) before committing suicide one day later.

== International career ==
Porte debuted for the national team in 1913, against Argentina, and scored his only goal for the national team in that occasion. He'd be capped in another two matches, against Chile in 1916, and against Brazil in 1917. He was a member of the Uruguay squad that won the 1917 South American Championship but did not play a game at the tournament.

== Death ==
Before starting the 1918 season, Nacional's committee decided to replace Porte by defender Alfredo Zibechi as starting player, sending Porte to the bench due to his poor performance during the last games played with the club. On 4 March, Nacional played Charley F.C., winning by 3–1 with Porte playing the entire match at a good level. That night, executives and players met at the club headquarters for a celebration as was usual. Porte left the club at 1:00 a.m. and took a tram to the Estadio Gran Parque Central, Nacional's venue.

Once Porte arrived at Parque Central, he went into the centre of the field and shot himself. His body and a suicide note were found the next morning. A dog found his body, drawing it to his master, Severino Castillo. Porte's body had two letters, one for the president of Nacional and the other to a relative.

"Dear Doctor José María Delgado: I ask you and other members of the committee to take care of my family and my dear mother, as I did. Goodbye, dear friend of life"

— Letter to the president of Nacional, José M. Delgado

The people of Uruguay were shocked by the news. Porte was buried at Cementerio de La Teja. Montevideo Wanderers offered Nacional to play a friendly match for the benefit of Porte's family while the rest of the Uruguayan clubs expressed their solidarity to Nacional.

"Nacional was Porte's ideal, he loved the club like a believer loves his faith, like a patriot loves his flag"

— Numa Pesquera, Nacional's executive

=== Legacy ===
Writer Horacio Quiroga was inspired on Porte's death to write his short story, "Juan Polti", published in 1918 in Atlántida magazine of Buenos Aires. Another Uruguayan writer, Eduardo Galeano, remembered Porte in a short chapter in his book El Fútbol a Sol y Sombra entitled "Muerte en la cancha" (Death on the pitch).

"After the game v. Charley, the Nacional committee decided that Alfredo Zibechi would play as centre back. Porte would be replaced. He would be a substitute player. He could not stand the impact: he wrote a letter, went to Parque Central (which had been a theatre for Porte's greatest achievements) and put an end to his life on the old field, where he had played brilliantly.(...) Five days later, Nacional played v. Wanderers F.C. in solidarity with Porte's family. We attended that game, where the remember of the Indio floated among us. When the attendance set their distraught eyes to the midfield... they were looking for Porte. We had seen many times there; He had felt asleep there. Maybe the old mindwill tower is still looking at that point"

— Chronicle by Uruguayan journalist Diego Lucero.

The club named "Abdón Porte" the western stand of Gran Parque Central. In March 2008 the Uruguayan Post Office printed a stamp honoring Porte. In August 2013, Nacional's supporters made a mosaic with the face of Abdón Porte.

== Honours ==
Nacional

- Uruguayan Primera División: 1912, 1915, 1916, 1917
- Copa Competencia: 1912, 1913, 1914, 1915
- Copa de Honor: 1913, 1914, 1915, 1916, 1917
- Tie Cup: 1913, 1915
- Copa de Honor Cousenier: 1915, 1916, 1917
- Copa Aldao: 1916

Uruguay

- Copa América: 1917
