= 1907 Copa de Honor Cousenier =

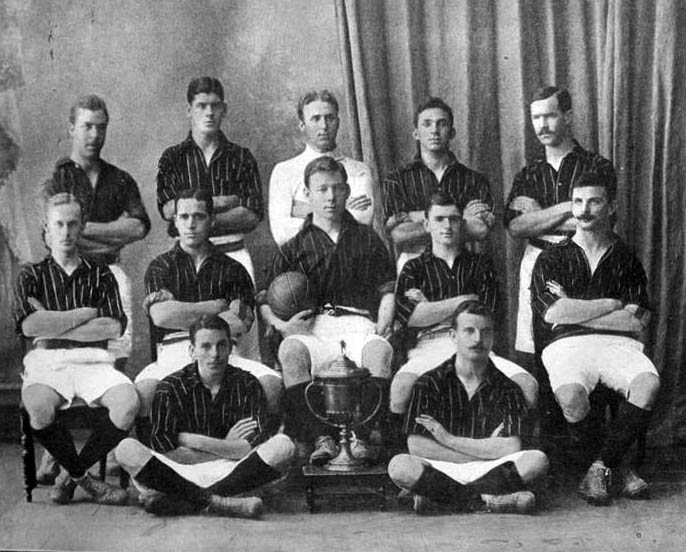
- Belgrano A.C., champions
- Event: Copa de Honor Cousenier
CURCC	Belgrano A.C.
(Uruguay)	(Argentina)
1	2
- Date: October 20, 1907
- Venue: Parque Central, Montevideo
- Referee: León Peyrou

The 1907 Copa de Honor Cousenier was the final match to decide the winner of the Copa de Honor Cousenier, the 3rd. edition of the international competition organised by the Argentine and Uruguayan Associations together. The final was contested by Uruguayan side CURCC and Argentine team Belgrano A.C.

The match was held in the Estadio Gran Parque Central in Montevideo, on October 20, 1907. Belgrano beat CURCC 2–1, winning its first Copa Cousenier trophy.

== Qualified teams ==
Team	Qualification	Previous final app.
(Uruguay) CURCC	1907 Copa Honor (U) champion	(none)
(Argentina) Belgrano	1907 Copa Honor MCBA champion	(none)

Note

- **Bold** indicates winning years

== Venue ==
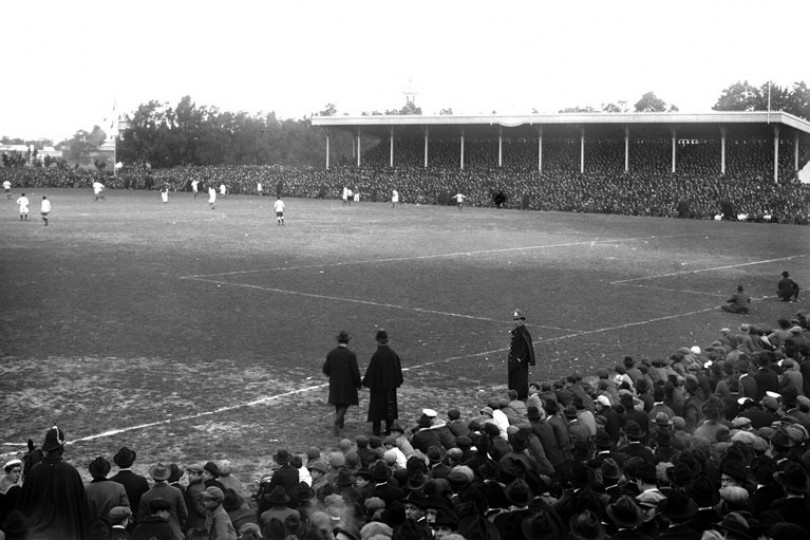
Parque Central

== Match details ==
1907 Copa de Honor Cousenier
October 20, 1907

CURCC (Uruguay)	1–2	(Argentina) Belgrano A.C.
Mañana	Report	Stocks; Khilberg

Parque Central, Montevideo
Referee: (Uruguay) León Peyrou

**CURCC**	**Belgrano**

GK	(England) Leonard Crossley
DF	(Uruguay) Ángel Irisarri
DF	(Uruguay) Mario Devincenzi
MF	(Uruguay) Ceferino Camacho
MF	(Uruguay) Lorenzo Mazzucco
MF	(Uruguay) Guillermo Manito
FW	(Uruguay) Vicente Manito
FW	(Uruguay) Eleuterio Pintos
FW	(Uruguay) Aniceto Camacho
FW	(Uruguay) Eugenio Mañana
FW	(Uruguay) Pedro Zibechi

GK	(England) George A. Scholefield
DF	(England) W. Gordon
DF	(England) G.D. Ferguson
MF	(England) F. Crocker
MF	(England) Harold Grant
MF	(England) Jean Wood
FW	(England) S.C. Khilberg
FW	(Argentina) Wilfredo Stocks
FW	(Argentina) Carlos Whaley
FW	(Argentina) Arthur Forrester
FW	(Argentina) Norman G. Forrester
