= Alfredo Foglino =

Uruguayan footballer and manager (1893-1968)

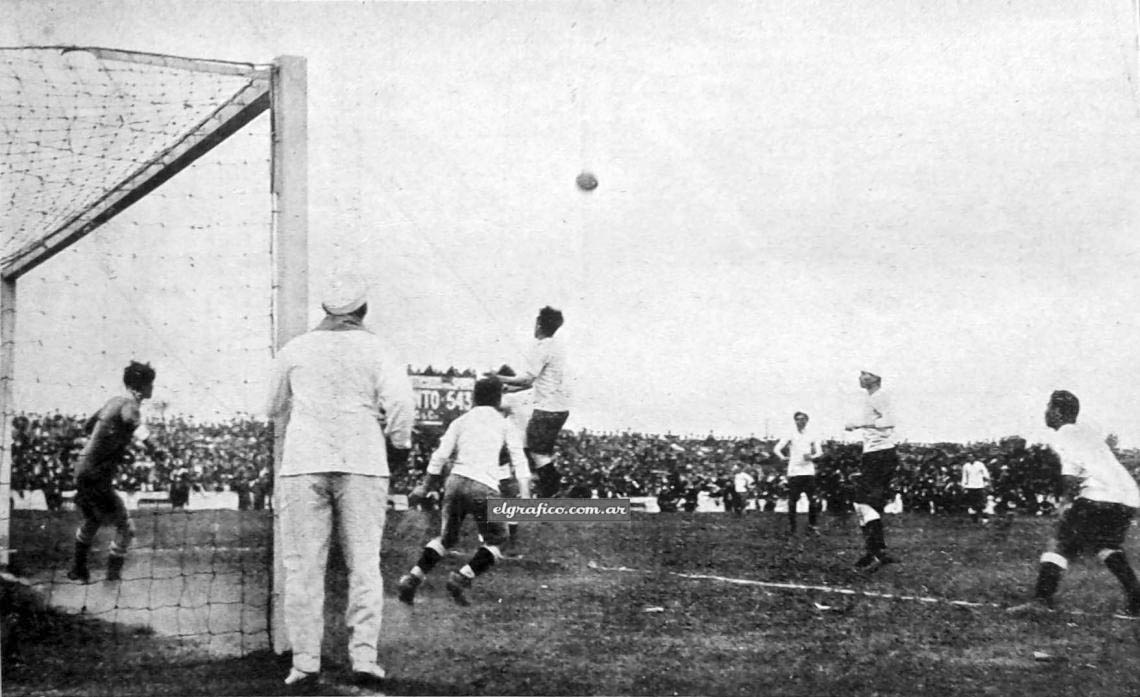

Personal information
- Full name: Alfredo Foglino
- Date of birth: 1 February 1893
- Place of birth: Montevideo, Uruguay
- Date of death: 1968 (aged 74–75)
- Position: Defender

Senior career*
| Years | Team | Apps | (Gls) |
| 1911–1925 | Nacional | 409 | |

International career
| 1912–1923 | Uruguay | 51 | (0) |

Managerial career
- 1915–1916: Uruguay
Medal record
Men's football
Representing Uruguay
South American Championship
| Winner | 1916 Argentina |
| Winner | 1917 Uruguay |
| Winner | 1920 Chile |
| Runner-up | 1919 Brazil |
| Third place | 1921 Argentina |
- * Club domestic league appearances and goals

Alfredo Foglino (1 February 1893–8 July 1968) was a Uruguayan football player and manager.

== Playing career ==
=== Club career ===
Foglino made his debut for Nacional in 1911. In 14 years for Nacional, Foglino played 409 matches including nine Primera División Uruguaya championships. He was captain of Nacional for ten years.

=== International career ===
Foglino played 47 times for Uruguay, making his debut for the national team in August 1912 and playing his last international in July 1923.

He played in three continental championships for Uruguay: in 1916, 1917 and 1920.

== Management career ==
=== Uruguay ===
Foglino was appointed player manager of the Uruguay national team for several matches in 1915 and 1916. As a 23-year-old he was at the helm of the Uruguay team that won the 1916 South American Championship.

== Honours ==
=== Club ===
- Nacional
  - Primera División Uruguaya: 1912, 1915, 1916, 1917, 1919, 1920, 1922, 1923, 1924

=== Country ===
- Uruguay
  - South American Championship (Copa América): 1916, 1917, 1920

=== Manager ===
- Uruguay
  - South American Championship (Copa América): 1916
