= 1908 Copa de Honor Cousenier =

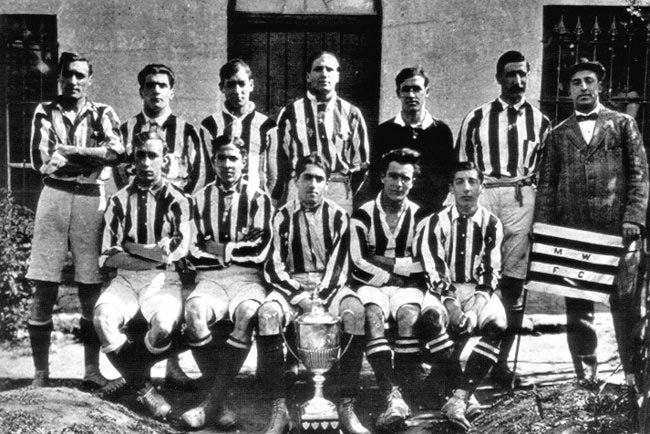
- Wanderers F.C., champions
- Event: Copa de Honor Cousenier
Wanderers	Quilmes
(Uruguay)	(Argentina)
2	0
- Date: October 11, 1908
- Venue: Parque Central, Montevideo
- Referee: L. Peyrou

The 1908 Copa de Honor Cousenier was the final match to decide the winner of the Copa de Honor Cousenier, the 4th. edition of the international competition organised by the Argentine and Uruguayan Associations together. The final was contested by Uruguayan side Wanderers and Argentine team Quilmes.

The match was held in the Estadio Gran Parque Central in Montevideo, on October 11, 1908. Wanderers beat Quilmes 2–0, winning its first Copa Cousenier trophy.

== Qualified teams ==
Team	Qualification	Previous final app.
(Uruguay) Wanderers	1908 Copa Honor (U) champion	(none)
(Argentina) Quilmes	1908 Copa Honor MCBA champion	(none)

Note

- **Bold** indicates winning years

== Match details ==
1908 Copa de Honor Cousenier
October 11, 1908

Wanderers	2–0	(Argentina) Quilmes
Piñeyro Carve 4'; Cavallotti 52'	Report

Parque Central, Montevideo
Referee: L. Peyrou

**Wanderers**	**Quilmes**

GK	(Uruguay) C. Saporiti
DF	(Uruguay) J.C. Bertone
DF	(Uruguay) M. Aphesteguy
MF	(Uruguay) A. Parravicini
MF	(Uruguay) F. Brande
MF	(Uruguay) L. Piñeyro Carve
FW	(Uruguay) T. Cavallotti
FW	(Uruguay) D. Rebagliatti
FW	(Uruguay) R. Marquisiox
FW	(Uruguay) A. Zumarán
FW	(Uruguay) E. Raymonda

GK	(Argentina) Carlos Pearson
DF	W. Leslies
DF	A. Lloyd
MF	J. Henderson
MF	J.A. Murray
MF	A. oldwell
FW	J. Stanfield
FW	S. Leonard
FW	H. Cunningham
FW	D. Middleton
FW	A. Well
