= 1916 Tie Cup final =

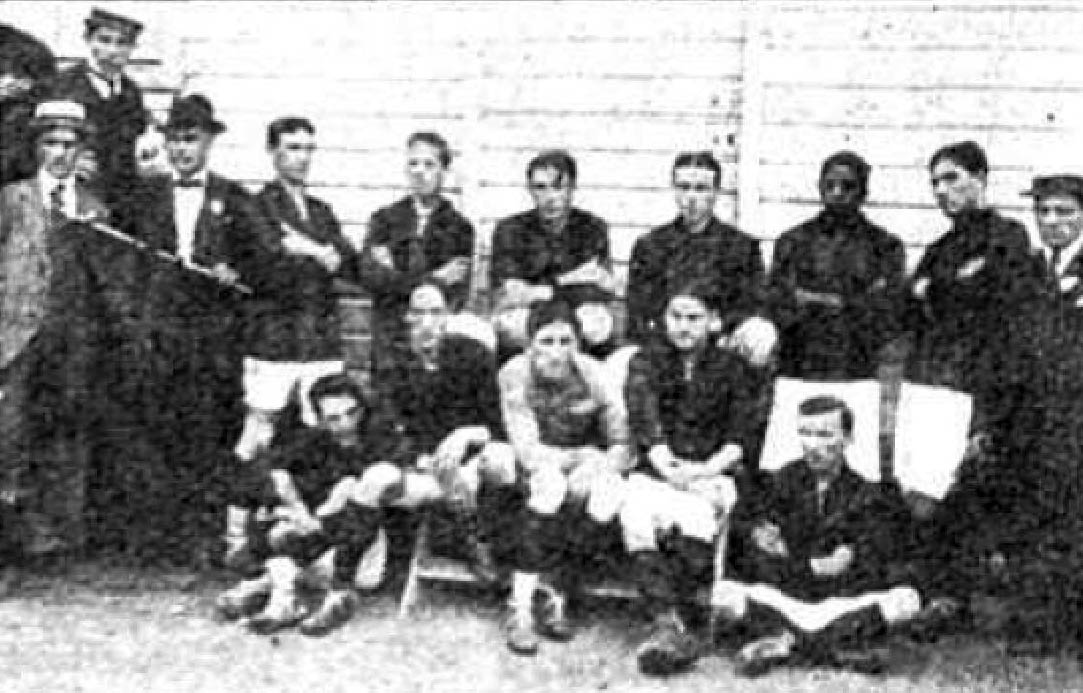
- Team of Peñarol, winners
- Event: 1916 Tie Cup
Rosario Central	Peñarol
(Argentina)	(Uruguay)
0	3
- Date: 24 December 1916
- Venue: Racing Club, Avellaneda
- Referee: Hugo Gondra (Argentina)

The 1916 Tie Cup final was the final match to decide the winner of the Tie Cup, the 17th edition of the international competition organised by the Argentine and Uruguayan Associations together. The final was contested by Argentine side Rosario Central and Uruguayan club Peñarol,

In the match, played at Racing Stadium in Avellaneda, Peñarol beat Rosario Central 3–0 with three goals by José Piendibene, winning the first and only Tie Cup trophy in the history of the club.

== Qualified teams ==
Team	Qualification	Previous final app.
(Argentina) Rosario Central	1916 Copa de Competencia (A) champions	(none)
(Uruguay) Peñarol	1916 Copa de Competencia (U) champions	(none)

- **Bold** indicates winning years

== Overview ==
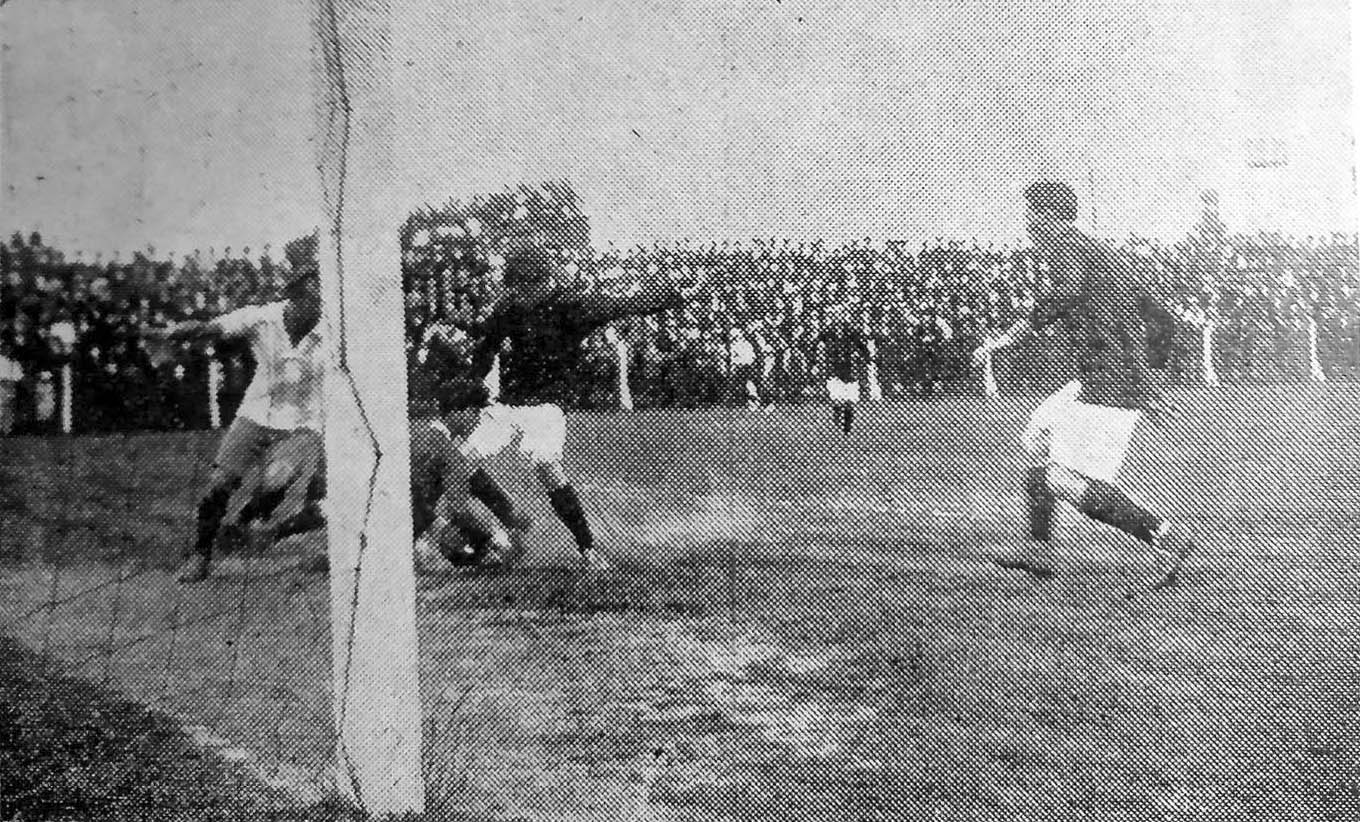
A moment of the match

Rosario Central earned its place in the final as the winner of 1916 Copa de Competencia Jockey Club, where the team enter.ed directly to semifinals to beat River Plate (1–1, 3–2 in playoff) and Independiente (2–1 in the final at Avellaneda).

The final was held in Estadio Racing Club in Avellaneda on Christmas Eve, 24 December 1916. With only 6 minutes of play, José Piendibene ran from the centre spot and passed to right, where José Pérez received the ball and ran to the penalty area where he made a pass that Piendibene headed for the first goal. On 28 minutes, Piendibene headed another ball for the 2–0 (after a pass by Pérez).

In the second half, on 77 minutes Piendibene shot to the goal after dribbling several players of Rosario Central. Perazzo tried to stop the ball but it hit on him with such bad luck that the ball crossed the goal line, becoming the third goal of the match. Therefore, Peñarol won its first Tie Cup title, with José Piendibene as the most valuable player with 3 goals scored.

== Match details ==
1916 Tie Cup Final
24 December 1916

Rosario Central (Argentina)	0–3	(Uruguay) Peñarol
	Report	Piendibene 6', 28', 77'

Racing Club, Avellaneda
Referee: Hugo Gondra (Argentina)

**Rosario Central**	**Peñarol**

GK	(Argentina) Guillermo Niblo
DF	(Argentina) Zenón Díaz
DF	(Argentina) Ignacio Rotta
MF	(Argentina) Ernesto Rigotti
MF	(Argentina) Ernesto Blanco
MF	(Argentina) Jacinto Perazzo
FW	(Argentina) Antonio Blanco
FW	(Argentina) José Laiolo
FW	(Argentina) Juan Enrique Hayes
FW	(Argentina) Ennis Hayes
FW	(Argentina) Fidel Ramírez

GK	(Uruguay) Roberto Chery
DF	(Uruguay) Pedro Rímolo
DF	(Uruguay) Manuel Varela
MF	(Uruguay) Jorge Pacheco
MF	(Uruguay) John Harley
MF	(Uruguay) Bernardo Savio
FW	(Uruguay) José Pérez
FW	(Uruguay) Mario Viola
FW	(Uruguay) José Piendibene
FW	(Uruguay) Isabelino Gradín
FW	(Uruguay) Antonio Campolo
