= 1918 Campeonato Uruguayo Primera División =

18th season of the top-tier football league in Uruguay

Uruguayan Primera División
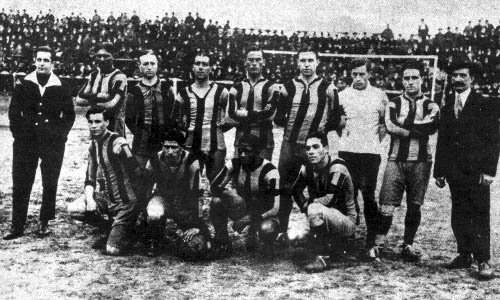
- Peñarol, champions
- Season: 1918 (18th)
- Champions: Peñarol (6th title) (Note: With Peñarol being recognised as a CURCC's continuity by FIFA and CONMEBOL, the club included the championships won by CURCC in its own honours.)
- Relegated: Misiones
- 1918 Copa Aldao: Peñarol
- Matches: 90
- Goals: 230 (2.56 per match)

The 1918 Primera División was the 18th season of Uruguay's top-flight football league.

== Overview ==
The tournament consisted of a two-wheel championship of all against all. It involved ten teams, and the champion was Peñarol, winning the first championship under that name and sixth if considered as a successor of Central Uruguay Railway Cricket Club. (Note: Controversy exists on the date of the founding of C.A. Peñarol. The club's official position assumes a change of name of CURCC (founded on December 28, 1891). On the other hand, some historians state that "C.A. Peñarol" was established on December 13, 1913.)

== Teams ==
Team	City	Stadium	Capacity	Foundation	Seasons	Consecutive seasons	Titles	1917
Central	Montevideo			5 January 1905	9	9	-	7th
Charley	Montevideo				1	1	-	8th
Dublin	Montevideo				7	2	-	6th
Misiones	Montevideo			26 May 1906	-	-	-	-
Nacional	Montevideo	Gran Parque Central	15,000	14 May 1899	16	16	6	1st
Peñarol	Montevideo			28 September 1891	17	17	5	2nd
Reformers	Montevideo				5	5	-	9th
River Plate	Montevideo			1897	11	11	4	5th
Universal	Montevideo				6	6	-	3rd
Montevideo Wanderers	Montevideo			15 August 1902	14	14	2	4th

== League standings ==
Pos	Team	Pld	W	D	L	GF	GA	GD	Pts
1	Peñarol (C)	18	15	2	1	43	5	+38	32
2	Nacional	18	14	2	2	52	9	+43	30
3	Universal	18	8	7	3	25	16	+9	23
4	Dublin	18	9	3	6	31	22	+9	21
5	Montevideo Wanderers	18	9	1	8	25	21	+4	19
6	Reformers	18	5	6	7	9	22	−13	16
7	Central	18	4	6	8	13	21	−8	14
8	River Plate F.C.	18	4	6	8	16	40	−24	14
9	Charley	18	2	4	12	11	37	−26	8
10	Misiones (R)	18	0	3	15	5	37	−32	3

Source: rsssf.com
(C) Champions; (R) Relegated

1918 Primera División
Peñarol
6th title
