= Leonard Crossley =

Association football player (1883–1958)

Leonard Crossley (1883 – 1958) was a British-born Uruguayan footballer. Crossley, who played as a goalkeeper, made two appearances for Uruguay in home and away friendly matches against Argentina in April and November 1911.

He was one of several foreign-born players to represent Uruguay in the early days of international football, a time when eligibility requirements were more lax.

== Biography ==
Crossley was not considered tall enough to play in English football at the top level. He emigrated to Uruguay in 1906 to work as a stenographer for the Central Uruguay Railway and soon began playing Uruguayan league football for Central Uruguay Railway Cricket Club (CURCC). An innovator on the field, Crossley differed from many other goalkeepers of the time through his "tactical vision", including a willingness to play the ball short and actively organize his defence. He rarely punched the ball, as was then common, instead "pocketing" it.

Crossley retired from playing for Peñarol, the successor to CURCC, in 1914 and immediately joined the club's management team.
