= 1920 Campeonato Uruguayo Primera División =

20th season of the top-tier football league in Uruguay

Uruguayan Primera División
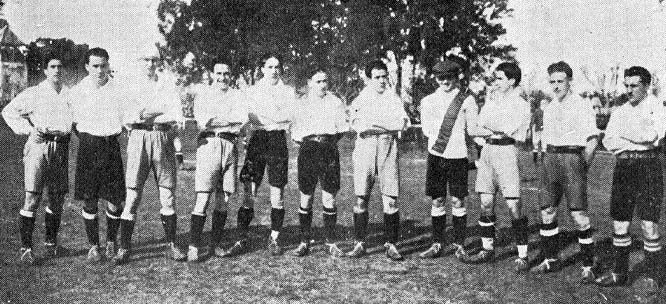
- Nacional, champions
- Season: 1920 (20th)
- Champions: Nacional
- Relegated: River Plate
- 1920 Copa Aldao: Nacional
- Matches: 132
- Goals: 364 (2.76 per match)

The Uruguayan Championship 1920 was the 20th season of Uruguay's top-flight football league.

== Overview ==
The tournament consisted of a two-wheel championship of all against all. It involved twelve teams, and the champion was Nacional.

== Teams ==
Team	City	Stadium	Capacity	Foundation	Seasons	Consecutive seasons	Titles	1919
Belgrano	Montevideo				1	1	-	8th
Central	Montevideo			5 January 1905	11	11	-	5th
Charley	Montevideo				3	3	-	10th
Dublin	Montevideo				9	4	-	6th
Liverpool	Montevideo			15 February 1915	-	-	-	-
Nacional	Montevideo	Gran Parque Central	15,000	14 May 1899	18	18	7	1st
Peñarol	Montevideo			28 September 1891	19	19	6	3rd
Reformers	Montevideo				7	7	-	9th
River Plate	Montevideo			1897	13	13	4	7th
Universal	Montevideo				8	8	-	2nd
Uruguay Onward	Montevideo				-	-	-	-
Montevideo Wanderers	Montevideo			15 August 1902	16	16	2	4th

== League standings ==
Pos	Team	Pld	W	D	L	GF	GA	GD	Pts
1	Nacional	22	19	2	1	85	12	+73	40
2	Peñarol	22	17	4	1	45	6	+39	38
3	Central	22	13	3	6	30	21	+9	29
4	Universal	22	12	4	6	44	22	+22	28
5	Montevideo Wanderers	22	10	3	9	31	23	+8	23
6	Reformers	22	5	9	8	16	30	−14	19
7	Uruguay Onward	22	8	3	11	32	49	−17	19
8	Liverpool	22	4	10	8	22	26	−4	18
9	Belgrano	22	5	6	11	15	35	−20	16
10	Dublin	22	4	5	13	12	42	−30	13
11	Charley	22	4	4	14	13	56	−43	12
12	River Plate F.C.	22	3	3	16	19	42	−23	9

Source: rsssf.com

Uruguayan Champion 1920
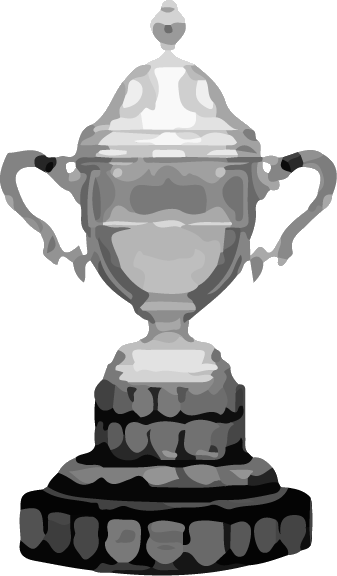

8th title
