= 1912 Copa de Honor Cousenier =

- Team of River Plate FC, champions
- Event: Copa de Honor Cousenier
River Plate	Racing
(Uruguay)	(Argentina)
2	1
- Date: 8 December 1912
- Venue: Parque Central, Montevideo

The 1912 Copa de Honor Cousenier was the final match to decide the winner of the Copa de Honor Cousenier, the 8th. edition of the international competition organised by the Argentine and Uruguayan Associations together. The final was contested by Uruguayan side River Plate and Argentine Racing Club de Avellaneda.

The match was held in the Estadio Gran Parque Central in Montevideo, on December 8, 1912. River Plate beat Racing Club 2–1, winning its first and only Copa Cousenier trophy.

== Qualified teams ==
Team	Qualification	Previous final app.
(Uruguay) River Plate	1912 Copa Honor (U) champion	(none)
(Argentina) Racing Club	1912 Copa Honor MCBA champion	(none)

Note

- **Bold** indicates winning years

== Match details ==
Team of Racing (left) and some moments of the match held in Parque Central
1912 Copa de Honor Cousenier
December 8, 1912

River Plate (Uruguay)	2–1	(Argentina) Racing Club
Benincasa 34'; Bruno 36'	Report	Ohaco 38'

Parque Central, Montevideo

**River Plate**	**Racing**

GK	(Uruguay) A. Cavalotti
DF	(Uruguay) J. Benincasa
DF	(Uruguay) M. Benincasa
MF	(Uruguay) G. Sanz
MF	(Uruguay) A. García
MF	(Uruguay) R. Ríos
FW	(Uruguay) V. Módena
FW	(Uruguay) R. Riveiro
FW	(Uruguay) S. Bruno
FW	(Uruguay) F. Seoane
FW	(Uruguay) A. Raymonda

GK	(Argentina) Carlos Muttoni
DF	(Argentina) Armando Reyes
DF	(Argentina) Saturnino Ochoa
MF	(Argentina) Ángel Betular
MF	(Argentina) Francisco Olazar
MF	(Argentina) Juan Ohaco
FW	(Argentina) Pedro Etchegaray
FW	(Argentina) Alberto Ohaco
FW	(Argentina) Alberto Marcovecchio
FW	(Argentina) Juan Hospital
FW	(Argentina) Juan Perinetti
