= 1906 Copa de Honor Cousenier =

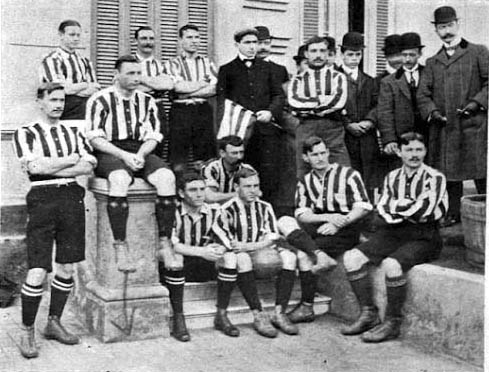
- An Alumni team of 1906
- Event: Copa de Honor Cousenier
Nacional	Alumni
(Uruguay)	(Argentina)
2	2
- Date: 16 September 1906
- Venue: Parque Central, Montevideo

Playoff
- Event: Copa de Honor Cousenier
Nacional	Alumni
(Uruguay)	(Argentina)
1	3
- Date: October 14, 1906
- Venue: Parque Central, Montevideo

The 1906 Copa de Honor Cousenier was the final match to decide the winner of the Copa de Honor Cousenier, the 2nd. edition of the international competition organised by the Argentine and Uruguayan Associations together. The final was contested by Uruguayan side Club Nacional de Football and Argentine team Alumni.

The match was held in the Estadio Gran Parque Central in Montevideo, on September 16, 1906. It ended tied (11) so a playoff was scheduled for October 14 in the same venue. Alumni won the re-match 3–1, taking revenge from the previous edition and winning its first Copa Cousenier trophy.

== Qualified teams ==
Team	Qualification	Previous final app.
(Uruguay) Nacional	1906 Copa Honor (U) champion	**1905**
(Argentina) Alumni	1906 Copa Honor MCBA champion	1905

Note

- **Bold** indicates winning years

== Venue ==
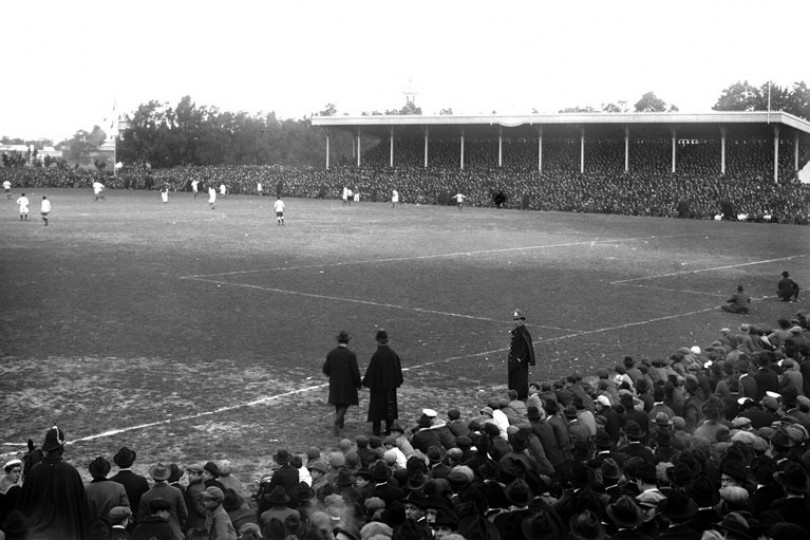
Estadio Parque Central, venue of both matches

== Match details ==
=== Final ===
1906 Copa de Honor Cousenier
September 16, 1906
Final

Nacional (Uruguay)	2–2	(Argentina) Alumni
Daglio 4'; Rincón 77'	Report	Watson Hutton 50'; E. Brown 71'

Parque Central, Montevideo
Referee: Torres.

**Nacional**	**Alumni**

GK	(Uruguay) A. Freitas
DF	(Uruguay) Carlos Carve Urioste
DF	(Uruguay) Marcos Frommel
MF	(Uruguay) Carlos ibils Juárez
MF	(Uruguay) Emilio Mongay
MF	(Uruguay) Pedro Zuazú
FW	(Uruguay) Carlos Cuadra
FW	(Uruguay) Gonzalo Rincón
FW	(Uruguay) Bernardino Daglio
FW	(Uruguay) Juan Montecoral
FW	(Uruguay) Alejandro Cordero

GK	(Argentina) José Buruca Laforia
DF	(Argentina) Juan Brown
DF	(Argentina) Jorge Brown
MF	(Argentina) Andrés Mack
MF	(Argentina) Carlos Lett
MF	(Argentina) Carlos Buchanan
MF	(Argentina) Patricio B. Browne
FW	(Argentina) Gottlob E. Weiss
FW	(Argentina) Alfredo C. Brown
FW	(Argentina) Arnold Watson Hutton
FW	(Argentina) Eliseo Brown
FW	(Argentina) Ernesto Brown

=== Playoff ===
October 14, 1906
Playoff

Nacional (Uruguay)	1–3	(Argentina) Alumni
Montecoral 52'	Report	Watson Hutton 8'; E. Brown 20'; E.A. Brown 39'

Parque Central, Montevideo

**Nacional**	**Alumni**

GK	(Uruguay) A. Freitas
DF	(Uruguay) Carlos Carve Urioste
DF	(Uruguay) Marcos Frommel
MF	(Uruguay) Carlos ibils Juárez
MF	(Uruguay) Emilio Mongay
MF	(Uruguay) Pedro Zuazú
FW	(Uruguay) Carlos Cuadra
FW	(Uruguay) Gonzalo Rincón
FW	(Uruguay) Bernardino Daglio
FW	(Uruguay) Juan Montecoral
FW	(Uruguay) Alejandro Cordero

GK	(Argentina) José Buruca Laforia
DF	(Argentina) Juan Brown
DF	(Argentina) Jorge Brown
MF	(Argentina) Andrés Mack
MF	(Argentina) Carlos Buchanan
MF	(Argentina) Patricio B. Browne
FW	(Argentina) Gottlob E. Weiss
FW	(Argentina) Carlos Lett
FW	(Argentina) Arnold Watson Hutton
FW	(Argentina) Eliseo Brown
FW	(Argentina) Ernesto Brown
