= 1917 Campeonato Uruguayo Primera División =

17th season of the top-tier football league in Uruguay

Uruguayan Primera División
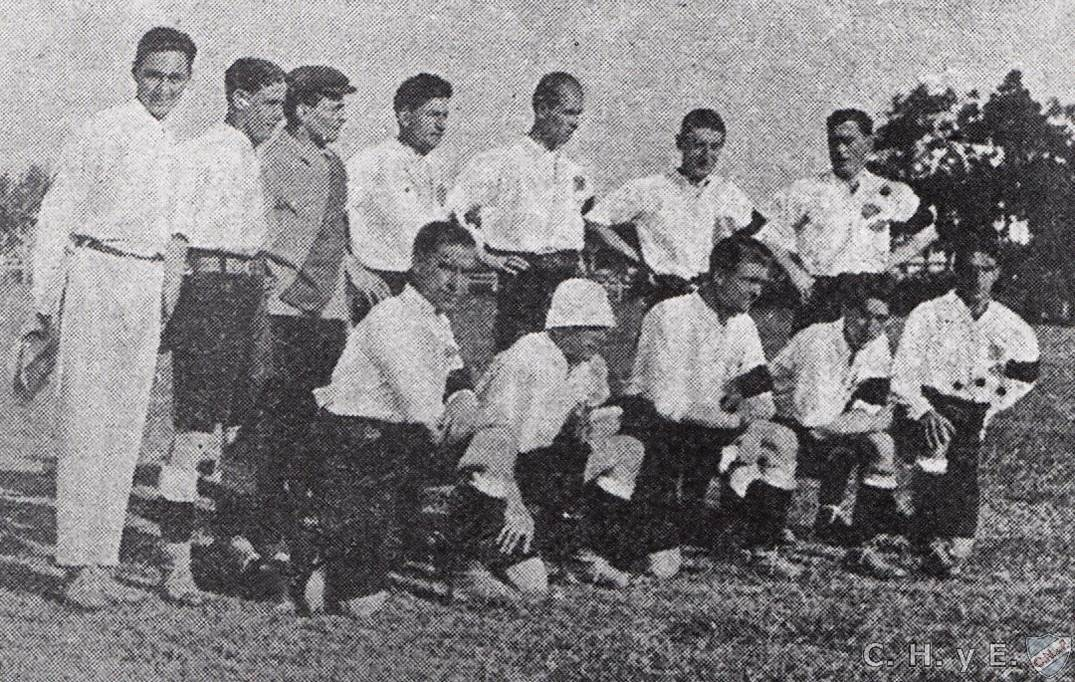
- Nacional, champions
- Season: 1917 (17th)
- Champions: Nacional
- Relegated: Defensor
- 1917 Copa Aldao: Nacional
- Matches: 90
- Goals: 202 (2.24 per match)

The Uruguayan Championship 1917 was the 17th season of Uruguay's top-flight football league.

== Overview ==
The tournament consisted of a two-wheel championship of all against all. It involved ten teams, and the champion was Nacional. This was the third consecutive title for Nacional, so they would get their first Cup. It was also the second tournament they won undefeated.

== Teams ==
Team	City	Stadium	Capacity	Foundation	Seasons	Consecutive seasons	Titles	1916
Central	Montevideo			5 January 1905	8	8	-	4th
Charley	Montevideo				-	-	-	-
Defensor	Montevideo			15 March 1913	2	2	-	8th
Dublin	Montevideo				6	1	-	7th
Nacional	Montevideo	Gran Parque Central	15,000	14 May 1899	15	15	5	1st
Peñarol	Montevideo			28 September 1891	16	16	5	2nd
Reformers	Montevideo				4	4	-	9th
River Plate	Montevideo			1897	10	10	4	5th
Universal	Montevideo				5	5	-	6th
Montevideo Wanderers	Montevideo			15 August 1902	13	13	2	3rd

== League standings ==
Pos	Team	Pld	W	D	L	GF	GA	GD	Pts
1	Nacional	18	16	2	0	47	3	+44	34
2	Peñarol	18	14	2	2	31	12	+19	30
3	Universal	18	8	5	5	24	18	+6	21
4	Montevideo Wanderers	18	6	5	7	17	16	+1	19 (Note: 2 bonus points?)
5	River Plate F.C.	18	5	5	8	18	27	−9	15
6	Dublin	18	6	2	10	22	28	−6	14
7	Central	18	4	6	8	14	23	−9	14
8	Charley	18	5	3	10	11	24	−13	13
9	Reformers	18	3	5	10	9	23	−14	11
10	Defensor	18	2	7	9	9	28	−19	11

Source: rsssf.com
Notes:

Uruguayan Champion 1917
Nacional
6th title
