= 1911 Campeonato Uruguayo Primera División =

11th season of the top-tier football league in Uruguay

Uruguayan Primera División
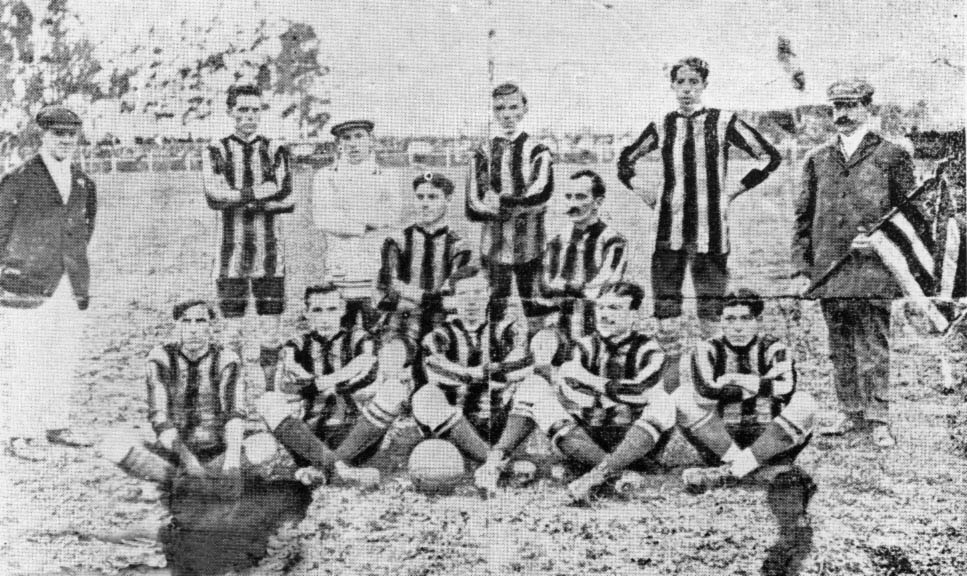
- CURCC, champions
- Season: 1911 11th)
- Champions: CURCC
- Relegated: Libertad
- Matches: 56
- Goals: 173 (3.09 per match)

The Uruguayan Championship 1911 was the 11th season of Uruguay's top-flight football league.

== Overview ==
The tournament consisted of a two-wheel championship of all against all. It involved eight teams, and the champion was C.U.R.C.C., an institution that earned its fifth and final championship in its history (from the 1914 championship, its place would be taken by the Club Atlético Peñarol).

After accumulating only 7 units at the end of the 14 rounds of the tournament, Libertad had to descend to the Second Division, this being their last appearance in the top flight of Uruguay.

== Teams ==
Team	City	Stadium	Capacity	Foundation	Seasons	Consecutive seasons	Titles	1910
Bristol	Montevideo				3	3	-	8th
CURCC	Montevideo			28 September 1891	10	10	4	2nd
Central	Montevideo			5 January 1905	2	2	-	5th
Dublin	Montevideo				3	3	-	6th
Libertad	Montevideo				1	1	-	7th
Nacional	Montevideo	Gran Parque Central	15,000	14 May 1899	9	9	2	3rd
River Plate	Montevideo			1897	4	4	2	1st
Montevideo Wanderers	Montevideo			15 August 1902	7	7	2	4th

== League standings ==
Pos	Team	Pld	W	D	L	GF	GA	GD	Pts
1	CURCC	14	12	1	1	29	9	+20	25
2	Montevideo Wanderers	14	6	4	4	28	13	+15	16
3	River Plate F.C.	14	5	5	4	25	14	+11	15
4	Dublin	14	6	3	5	25	26	−1	15
5	Nacional	14	6	3	5	17	19	−2	15
6	Bristol	14	4	2	8	20	32	−12	10
7	Central	14	3	3	8	17	27	−10	9
8	Libertad	14	2	3	9	12	33	−21	7

Source: rsssf.com

Uruguayan Champion 1911
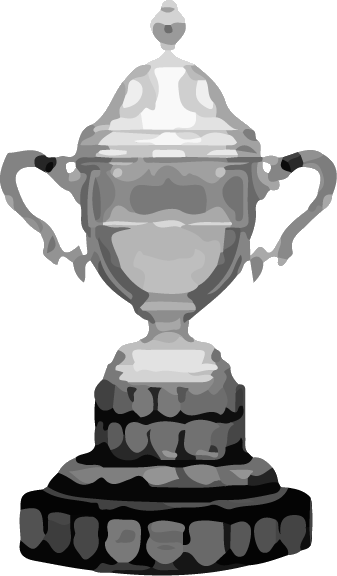
CURCC
5th title
