= 1919 Campeonato Uruguayo Primera División =

19th season of the top-tier football league in Uruguay

Uruguayan Primera División
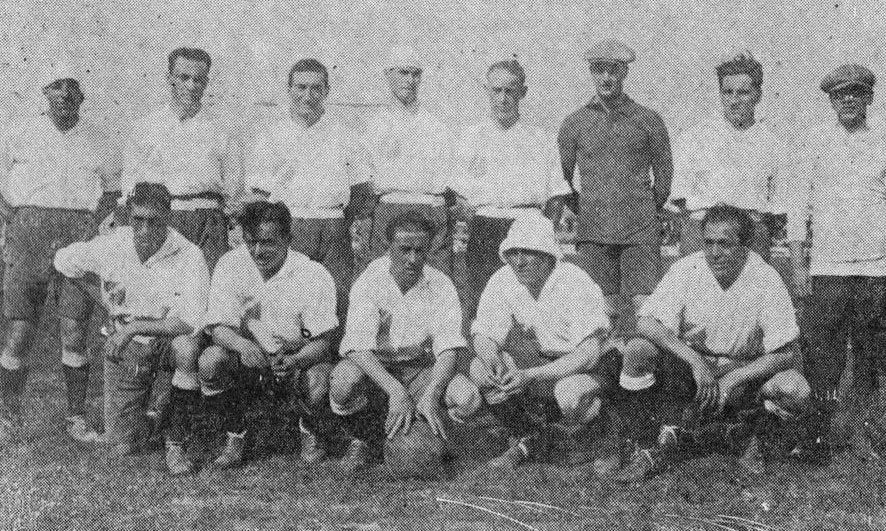
- Nacional, champions
- Season: 1919 (19th)
- Champions: Nacional
- 1919 Copa Aldao: Nacional
- Matches: 90
- Goals: 192 (2.13 per match)

The Uruguayan Championship 1919 was the 19th season of Uruguay's top-flight football league.

== Overview ==
The tournament consisted of a two-wheel championship of all against all. It involved ten teams, and the champion was Nacional.

== Teams ==
Team	City	Stadium	Capacity	Foundation	Seasons	Consecutive seasons	Titles	1918
Belgrano	Montevideo				-	-	-	-
Central	Montevideo			5 January 1905	10	10	-	7th
Charley	Montevideo				2	2	-	9th
Dublin	Montevideo				8	3	-	4th
Nacional	Montevideo	Gran Parque Central	15,000	14 May 1899	17	17	6	2nd
Peñarol	Montevideo			28 September 1891	18	18	6	1st
Reformers	Montevideo				6	6	-	6th
River Plate	Montevideo			1897	12	12	4	8th
Universal	Montevideo				7	7	-	3rd
Montevideo Wanderers	Montevideo			15 August 1902	15	15	2	5th

== League standings ==
Pos	Team	Pld	W	D	L	GF	GA	GD	Pts
1	Nacional	18	15	1	2	47	5	+42	31
2	Universal	18	13	3	2	28	8	+20	29
3	Peñarol	18	11	4	3	27	6	+21	26
4	Montevideo Wanderers	18	10	2	6	26	14	+12	22
5	Central	18	6	5	7	22	27	−5	17
6	Dublin	18	3	8	7	12	24	−12	14
7	River Plate	18	2	8	8	8	27	−19	12
8	Belgrano	18	1	9	8	9	30	−21	11
9	Reformers	18	2	6	10	7	19	−12	10
10	Charley	18	1	6	11	6	32	−26	8

Source: rsssf.com

Uruguayan Champion 1919
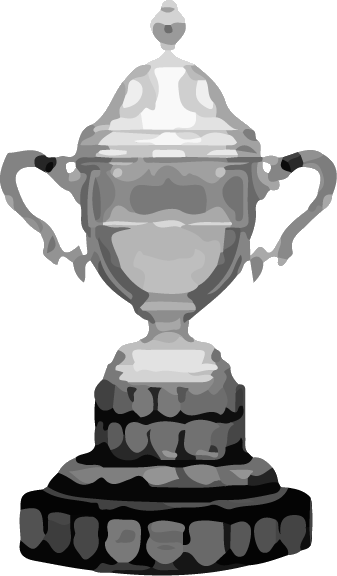

7th title
