= Parque Pereira =

Former stadium in Montevideo, Uruguay

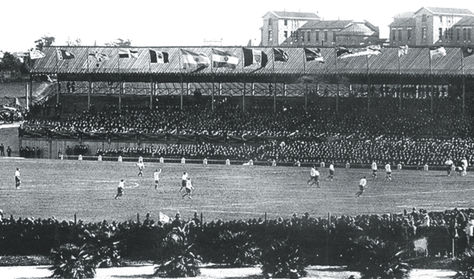
- The stadium during the 1917 South American Championship.
- Location: Montevideo, Uruguay
- Owner: Government of Uruguay
- Capacity: 40,000
- Type: Stadium
- Surface: Grass

Construction
- Opened: 1917
- Demolished: 1920; 106 years ago

Parque Pereira was a multi-use stadium in Montevideo, Uruguay. It was used mostly for association football matches and was used as a venue during the 1917 South American Championship. The stadium (one of the first in Latin America) held 40,000 people and was located near the actual Estadio Centenario.

== History ==
Parque Pereira was built under the responsibility of National Commission of Physical Education of Uruguay. The first football match played there was the classic Peñarol-Nacional, on October 28, 1917 with an attendance of 20,000 people. Nacional won by 4-2.

The record for that stadium was 40,000 spectators in the 1917 South American championship final where Uruguay won its second consecutive Copa América after beating Argentina. The last event held there was another Peñarol v. Nacional match (won by Peñarol), on May 2, 1920.

The stadium was demolished that same year. In that place, an athletics track was built. Architect Juan Scasso (who would later take over the construction of Estadio Centenario) was the director of the project.

Preceded by Estadio Racing Club; Avellaneda	Copa América; Final Round Matches; 1919	Succeeded by Estádio das Laranjeiras; Rio de Janeiro
