= 1916 Campeonato Uruguayo Primera División =

16th season of the top-tier football league in Uruguay

Uruguayan Primera División
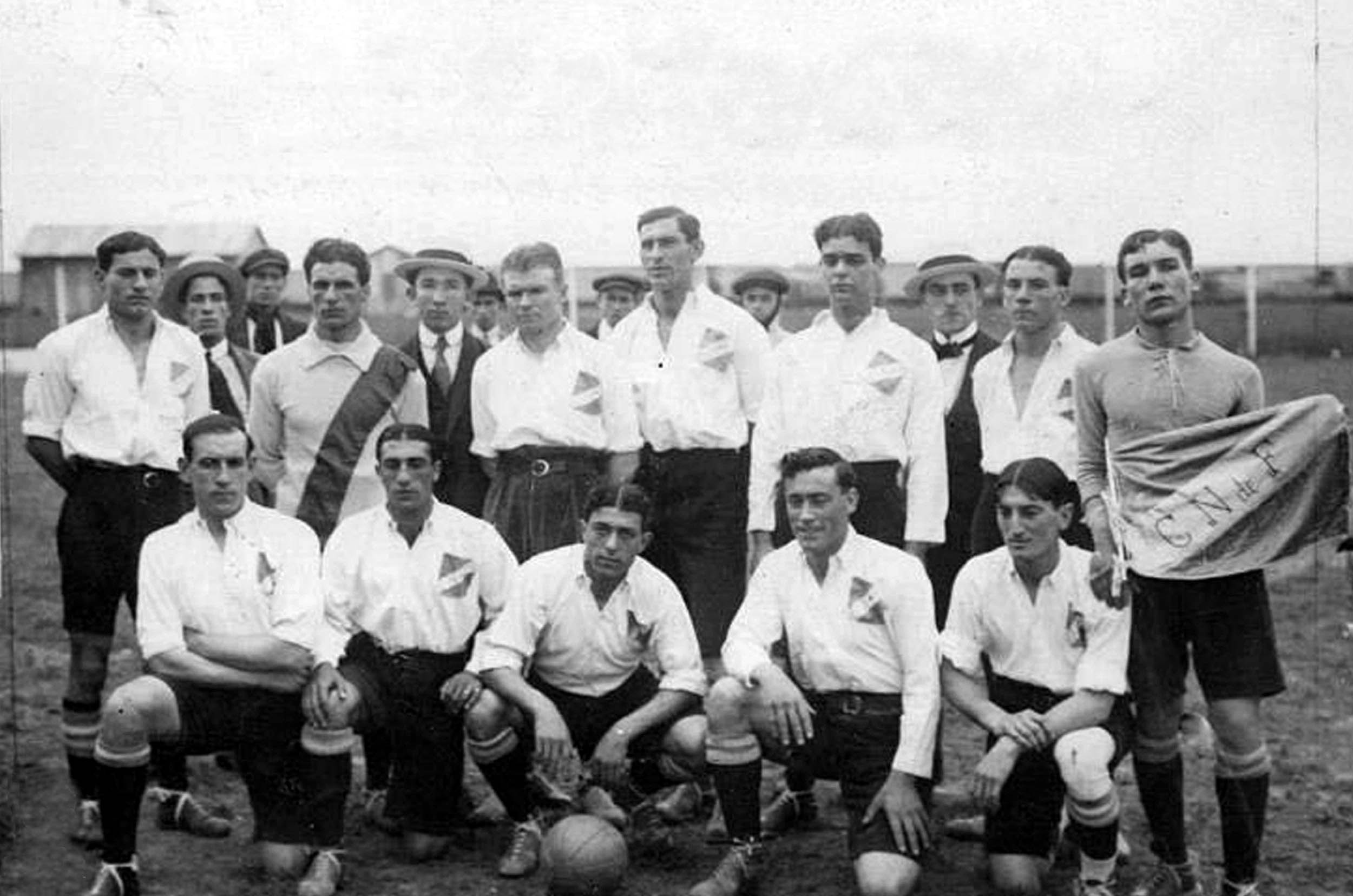
- Nacional, champions
- Season: 1916 (16th)
- Champions: Nacional
- 1916 Copa Aldao: Nacional
- Matches: 72
- Goals: 153 (2.13 per match)

The Uruguayan Championship 1916 was the 16th season of Uruguay's top-flight football league.

== Overview ==
The tournament consisted of a two-wheel championship of all against all. It involved nine teams, and the champion was Nacional.

== Teams ==
Team	City	Stadium	Capacity	Foundation	Seasons	Consecutive seasons	Titles	1915
Central	Montevideo			5 January 1905	7	7	-	7th
Defensor	Montevideo			15 March 1913	1	1	-	4th
Dublin	Montevideo				5	-	-	-
Nacional	Montevideo	Gran Parque Central	15,000	14 May 1899	14	14	4	1st
Peñarol	Montevideo			28 September 1891	15	15	5	2nd
Reformers	Montevideo				3	3	-	8th
River Plate	Montevideo			1897	9	9	4	6th
Universal	Montevideo				4	4	-	3rd
Montevideo Wanderers	Montevideo			15 August 1902	12	12	2	5th

== League standings ==
Pos	Team	Pld	W	D	L	GF	GA	GD	Pts
1	Nacional	16	14	2	0	28	5	+23	30
2	Peñarol	16	7	4	5	29	19	+10	18
3	Montevideo Wanderers	16	7	3	6	13	20	−7	17
4	Central	16	6	3	7	16	17	−1	15
5	River Plate	16	4	5	7	18	17	+1	13
6	Universal	16	3	7	6	16	19	−3	13
7	Dublin	16	4	5	7	13	17	−4	13
8	Defensor	16	4	5	7	10	17	−7	13
9	Reformers	16	5	2	9	10	22	−12	12

Source: rsssf.com

Uruguayan Champion 1916
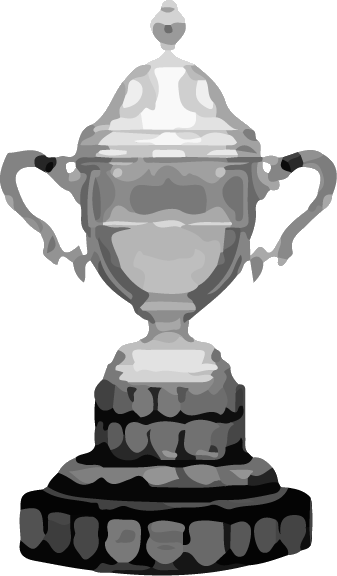
Nacional
5th title
