= Universal Football Club =

Football club from Uruguay

Universal
- Full name: Universal Football Club
- Dissolved: 1920s
- Ground: Parque Salvio; Montevideo
- League: Primera División
- 1927: 20
Home colours

Universal Football Club was a Uruguayan football club based in Montevideo that participated in the Primera División in the 1910s and 1920s before being dissolved.

== History ==
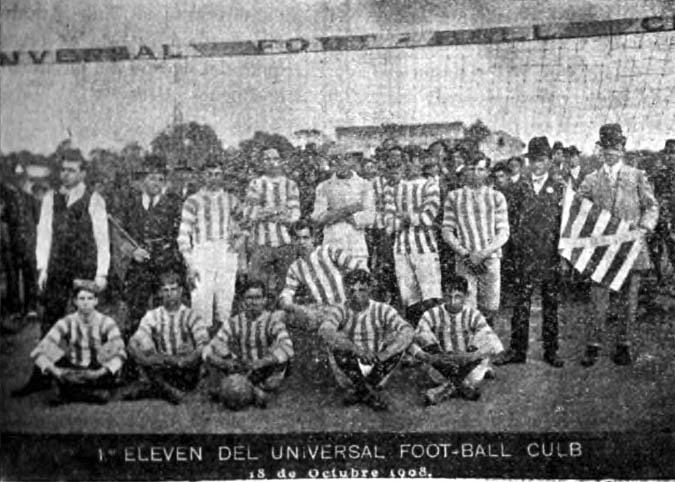
Universal squad in 1908

Universal debuted in Primera División in the 1912 season, finishing in the penultimate position. The club's best performance was in 1919, when it finished 2nd to Nacional.

In 1920 Universal achieved its only official title, the domestic Copa de Honor, that qualified the club to play international Copa de Honor Cousenier, which lost to Boca Juniors (Note: Banfield won the Copa de Honor MCBA in 1920 and should have played Universal but the club disaffiliated from the Argentine Association soon after, therefore Boca Juniors (as runner-up) took its place to play the Copa de Honor Cousenier.) by 2–0.

When both Uruguayan football associations, AUF and FUF, merged in 1926, Universal played the 1927 season, which would be its last in the top division of Uruguayan football. The squad finished 20th (last), being relegated to the second division. It is believed the club was dissolved soon after.

== Titles ==
- Copa de Honor (Uruguay) (1): 1920
- Segunda División (1): 1911
- Copa León Peyrou (1): 1919
