= Copa de Honor Cousenier =

Copa de Honor Cusenier
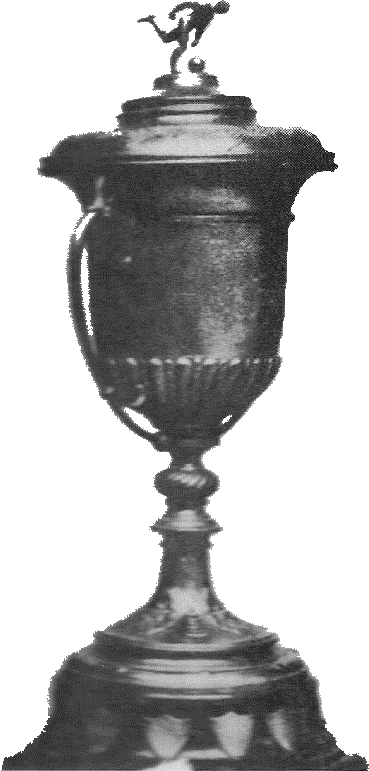
- The trophy awarded to champions
- Organiser(s): AFA; AUF
- Founded: 1905
- Abolished: 1920; 106 years ago
- Region: Montevideo, Uruguay
- Related competitions: Copa Honor (Arg); Copa Honor (Uru)
- Last champions: (Argentina) Boca Juniors (1920)
- Most championships: (Uruguay) Nacional (4 titles)

The Copa de Honor Cusenier was an international football club competition which was played 13 times between representatives of the Argentina and Uruguay associations between 1905 and 1920.

== History ==
The trophy was donated by "E. Cusenier Fils Auné & Cie.", a French liqueur company that had installed a factory in Buenos Aires in the 1890s, giving its name to the competition. Initially, the cup was set to be played between representatives of AFA, AUF and Liga Rosarina.

The format of the cup consisted in a final between the last champions of Argentine Copa de Honor and Uruguayan Copa de Honor. If necessary, a second match was played. It was similar to Tie Cup but the final games were played at Montevideo instead of Buenos Aires. The first edition was played in 1905 and the last took place in 1920.

== List of champions ==
=== Finals ===
The following list includes all the editions of the cup. All the final games were held in Montevideo.

Ed.	Year	Champion	Score	Runner-up	Venue
1	1905	(Uruguay) Nacional (1)	3–2	(Argentina) Alumni	Parque Central
2	1906	(Argentina) Alumni (1)	2–2	(Uruguay) Nacional	Parque Central
2	1906	(Argentina) Alumni (1)	3–1	(Uruguay) Nacional	Parque Central
3	1907	(Argentina) Belgrano AC (1)	2–1	(Uruguay) CURCC	Parque Central
4	1908	(Uruguay) Wanderers (1)	2–0	(Argentina) Quilmes	Parque Central
5	1909	(Uruguay) CURCC (1)	4–2	(Argentina) San Isidro	Parque Central
–	1910	(not held) (Note: Montevideo Wanderers had qualified as champion of Uruguayan Copa de Honor, but as Argentine Copa de Honor was abandoned after the quarterfinals, this edition was not carried out.)			
6	1911	(Uruguay) CURCC (2)	2–0	(Argentina) Newell's	Parque Central
7	1912	(Uruguay) River Plate (M) (1)	2–1	(Argentina) Racing	Parque Central
8	1913	(Argentina) Racing (1)	1–1	(Uruguay) Nacional	Parque Central
8	1913	(Argentina) Racing (1)	3–2	(Uruguay) Nacional	Parque Central
–	1914	(contested by Uruguayan clubs only) (Note: This was not a regular edition because of having been contested by two Uruguayan teams, Nacional and Peñarol.)			
9	1915	(Uruguay) Nacional (2)	2–0	(Argentina) Racing	Parque Central
10	1916	(Uruguay) Nacional (3)	6–1	(Argentina) Rosario Central	Parque Central
11	1917	(Uruguay) Nacional (4)	3–1	(Argentina) Racing	Parque Pereira
12	1918	(Uruguay) Peñarol (1)	4–0	(Argentina) Independiente	Parque Pereira
13	1920	(Argentina) Boca Juniors (1) (Note: Banfield won the Copa de Honor MCBA in 1920 and should have played Universal but the club disaffiliated from the Argentine Association soon after, therefore Boca Juniors (as runner-up) took its place.)	2–0	(Uruguay) Universal	Parque Central

=== Titles by club ===
Club	Titles	Years won
(Uruguay) Nacional	4	1905, 1915, 1916, 1917 (Note: As the 1914 edition was a local edition with no Argentine teams, it does not count as a Copa de Honor Cusenier edition.)
(Uruguay) CURCC (Note: With Peñarol being recognised as a CURCC's continuity by FIFA, the club included the championships won by CURCC in its own honours. Controversy exists on the date of the founding of C.A. Peñarol. The club's official position assumes a change of name of CURCC (founded on December 28, 1891). On the other hand, some historians state that "C.A. Peñarol" was established on December 13, 1913.)	2	1909, 1911
(Uruguay) Peñarol	1	1918
(Argentina) Alumni	1	1906
(Argentina) Belgrano AC	1	1907
(Uruguay) Wanderers	1	1908
(Uruguay) River Plate (M)	1	1912
(Argentina) Racing	1	1913
(Argentina) Boca Juniors	1	1920

== All-time scorers ==
Player	Goals	Club
(Uruguay) Ángel Romano	7	(Uruguay) Nacional
(Uruguay) Carlos Scarone	3	(Uruguay) Nacional
(Argentina) Arnold Watson Hutton	2	(Argentina) Alumni
(Argentina) Eliseo Brown	2	(Argentina) Alumni
(Argentina) Alberto Marcovecchio	2	(Argentina) Racing

== See also ==
- Copa de Honor Municipalidad de Buenos Aires
- Copa de Honor (Uruguay)
