= 1905 Copa de Honor Cousenier =

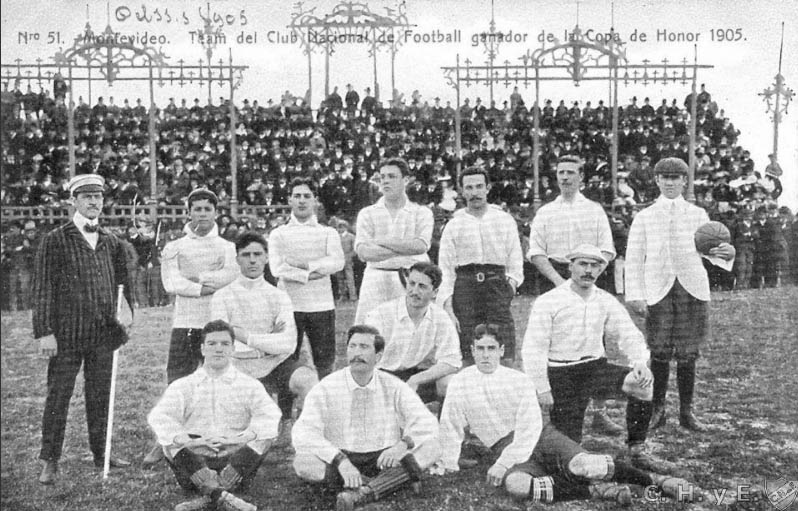
- Team of Nacional, champions
- Event: Copa de Honor Cousenier
Nacional	Alumni
(Uruguay)	(Argentina)
3	2
- Date: 10 September 1905
- Venue: Parque Central, Montevideo

The 1905 Copa de Honor Cousenier was the final match to decide the winner of the Copa de Honor Cousenier, the 1st. edition of the international competition organised by the Argentine and Uruguayan Associations together. The final was contested by Uruguayan side Club Nacional de Football and Argentine team Alumni.

The match was held in the Estadio Gran Parque Central in Montevideo, on September 10, 1905. Nacional beat Alumni 3–2 with goals by Rincón (2) and de Castro, achieving its first Cousenier trophy.

== Qualified teams ==
Team	Qualification	Previous final app.
(Uruguay) Nacional	1905 Copa Honor (U) champion	(none)
(Argentina) Alumni	1905 Copa Honor MCBA champion	(none)

Note

- **Bold** indicates winning years

== Venue ==
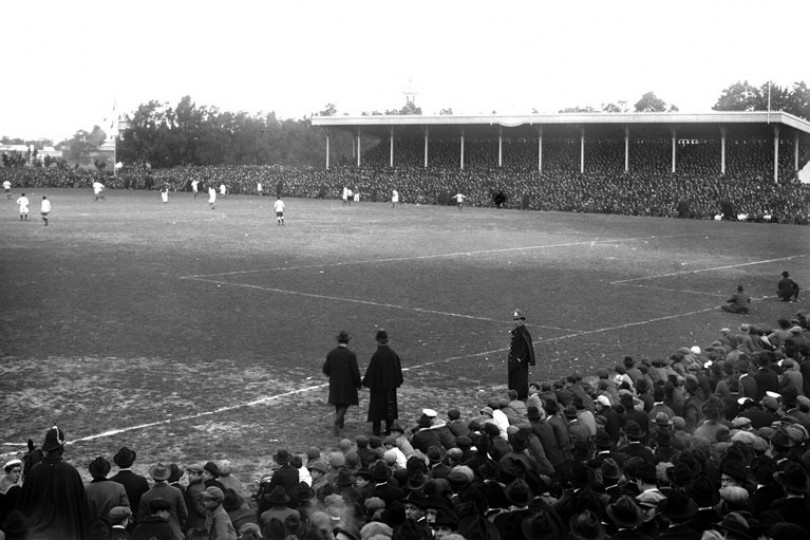
Estadio Parque Central

== Match details ==
1905 Copa de Honor Cousenier
September 10, 1905

Nacional (Uruguay)	3–2	(Argentina) Alumni
Rincón (2) de Castro	Report	J. Moore; E. Moore

Parque Central, Montevideo

**Nacional**	**Alumni**

GK	(Uruguay) Amílcar Céspedes
DF	(Uruguay) Carlos Carve Urioste
DF	(Uruguay) Ernesto Boutón Reyes
MF	(Uruguay) Miguel Nebel
MF	(Uruguay) Emilio Mongay
MF	(Uruguay) Arturo Rovegno
FW	(Uruguay) Carlos Cuadra
FW	(Uruguay) Gonzalo Rincón
FW	(Uruguay) Eduardo de Castro
FW	(Uruguay) Alejandro Cordero
FW	(England) John Diggs

GK	(Argentina) José Buruca Laforia
DF	(Argentina) Carlos Brown
DF	(Argentina) Jorge Brown
MF	(Australia) (Argentina) Andrés Mack
MF	(Argentina) Patricio B. Browne
MF	(Argentina) Eliseo Brown
FW	(Argentina) Gottlob E. Weiss
FW	(Argentina) Juan Moore
FW	(Argentina) Alfredo Brown
FW	(Argentina) Tomás Brown
FW	(Argentina) Eugenio Moore
