= Central Uruguay Railway Cricket Club =

C.U.R.C.C.
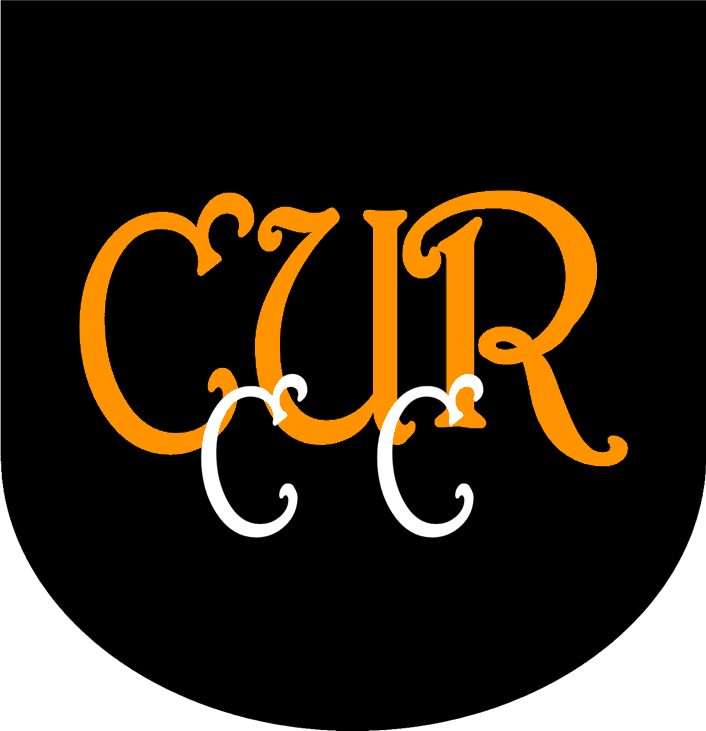
- Full name: Central Uruguay Railway Cricket Club
- Founded: September 28, 1891
- Dissolved: January 22, 1915; 111 years ago
- Chairman: Percy Sedgfield
Home colours

Central Uruguay Railway Cricket Club (mostly known by its acronym CURCC) was a Uruguayan sports club, originally established by British railway workers for the practise of cricket. Nevertheless, the club would be notable for its football section, considered one of the greatest contributors to that sport in Uruguay. In fact, CURCC was one of the founding members of Uruguayan Football Association (AUF) in 1900.

The continuity between the CURCC's football section and club Peñarol generated a controversy that remains nowadays. (Note: Controversy exists on the date of the founding of C.A. Peñarol. The club's official position assumes a change of name of CURCC (founded on December 28, 1891). On the other hand, some historians state that "C.A. Peñarol" was established on December 13, 1913.)

== History ==
=== Railway origins ===
By the end of 1899 the British company Central Uruguay Railway of Montevideo, that operated in Uruguay since 1878, acquired the lands located in the neighborhood of Villa Peñarol to establish its train repair shops there, moving them from Bella Vista. Those lands had been used for agriculture only and famous because of the best quality of its vineyards and fruits. One of the main achievements of the company was the establishment of a rural school in the town.

Due to the industrial activity, the village became populous. The sons of blonde Albion, who were part of the company, decided to found a sports centre that serve as recreation to people that lived around the workshops.

=== First years and success ===
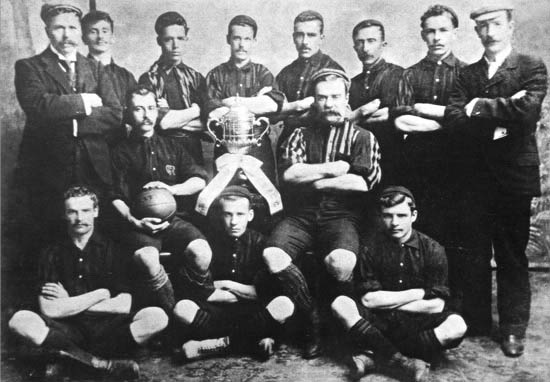
The team that won its first Primera División championship in 1900

According to the club's foundation charter, CURCC was established on September 28, 1891, by the workers and employees of the Central Uruguay Railway Company of Montevideo, with the purpose of stimulating the practice of cricket, football and "other male sports" (literal from the Spanish). The first committee was formed by eight members: Mr. Hudson, Lucy, Moor, Davenport, Hopkins, Davies, and Penny. They chose Mr. Frank Henderson as the first president of the club. The membership fee was established in $ 0,50.

One day later, the committee resolved to name the club "Central Uruguay Railway Cricket Club". That same day two members of the committee were chosen to write the rules, while two other members were chosen to search for a field to practice sports. The club also designated three members to take over advertising with the purpose of bringing new members to the institution.

The article I of club's statute stated that the club colours would be that of the Stephenson's Rocket locomotive and that only workers of Central Railway would be admitted as members. Nevertheless, the committee could admit people outside the company but they were not allowed to vote in case of being accepted.

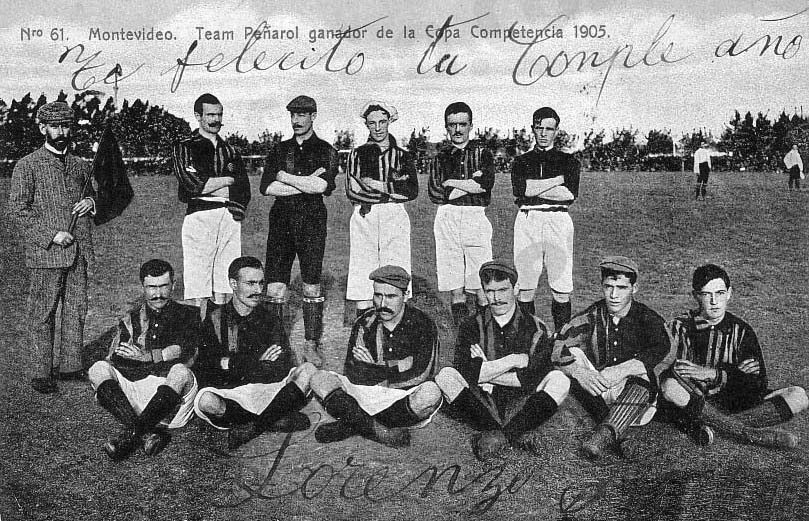
The 1905 squad won the third league title for the club

Having been established as a cricket club, football began to be practised at CURCC in 1892, relegating other sports, such as cricket and rugby. The first football match played by CURCC was that same year versus a combined team of English High School. The match was won by CURCC 3–2.

At the beginning, all the CURCC presidents were managers of the CUR. In 1907 the company appointed W. Bayne as manager and sent him to Montevideo. When the CURCC executives told Bayne he was the new president of the institution, he did not accept the offer, alleging that the coaches damaged by the supporters led to significant costs. Other reason given by Bayne was the lack of players-workers.

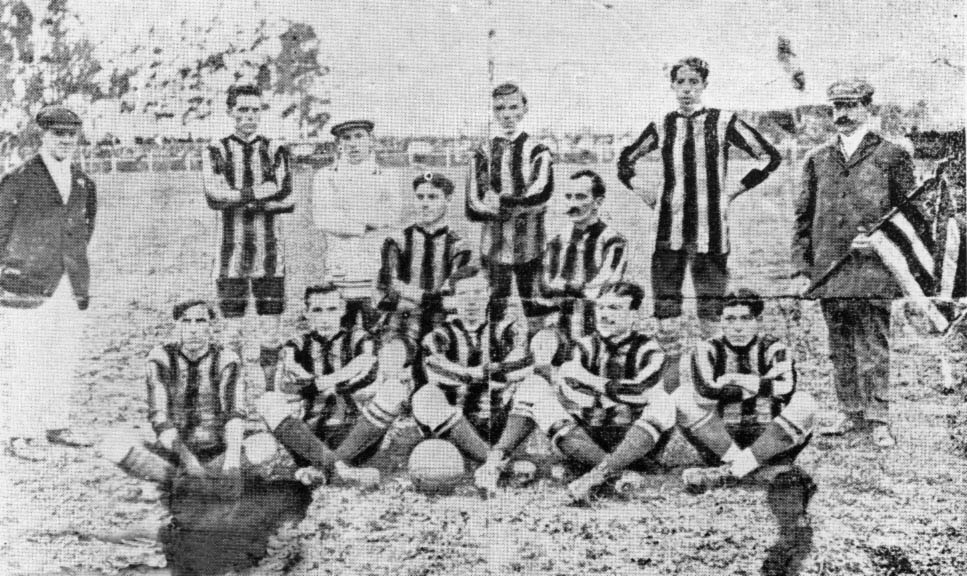
In 1911 the CURCC won two titles

In football, CURCC was one of the founding members of Uruguayan Football Association (AUF) along with Albion, Uruguay A.C. and Deutscher, in 1900. The club played in the recently created Primera División since its first edition in 1900, along with Nacional, other team from Montevideo with whom CURCC had a strong rivalry. While CURCC represented the British immigrants to Uruguay and rail workers as well, the criollo people and university students felt empathy with Nacional.

The club took part of 13 editions of the domestic championship, winning it in five occasions between 1900 and 1911. CURCC also won the Copa de Competencia seven times and the Copa de Honor on three occasions. Internationally, the squad won the Copa de Honor Cousenier twice.

=== Controversy: C.A. Peñarol ===
By the 1910s, the Central Uruguay Railway Company (which had created the club and was also its administrator) considered to retire the football section from official practice alleging the club had left behind its original purpose of being a recreational place for employees of the company. There are two different versions about what happened at the end of 1913 related to the foundation of "C.A. Peñarol", those are:

- The group of members took over the football section, under a new denomination
- They separated from the CURCC establishing a new football institution
Peñarol documents

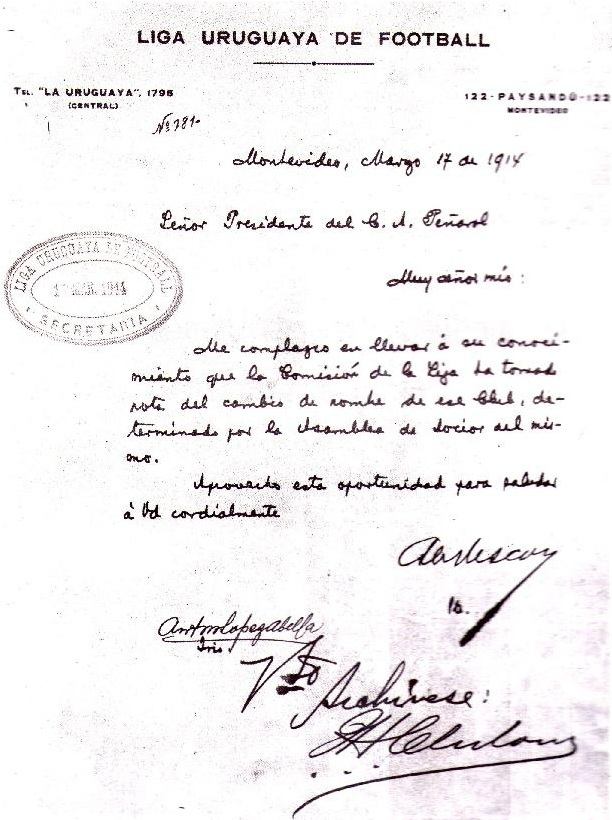
1914 letter from the Uruguayan League, approving the club's name change

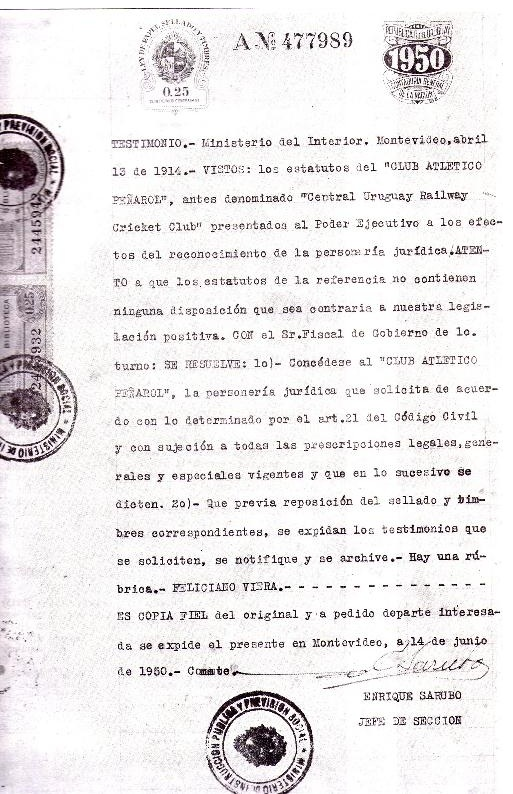
Uruguayan document acknowledging Peñarol as successor of the CURCC

In 1914, the Uruguayan Association was notified of the "change of name" by Peñarol, recognising it as the continuity of CURCC, (Note: Peñarol was recognised as the CURCC's continuity by FIFA and CONMEBOL, when those entities mentioned 1891 as the date of foundation of the club.) through a letter signed by AUF president Abelardo Véscoli, on March 17, 1914. As a result, Peñarol filled the CURCC's place in the Uruguayan Primera División to be played in 1914. The club introduced new name, badge, executives, statutes and even a new settlement (Montevideo instead of "Villa Peñarol").

On April 13, 1914, the Ministry of Internal Affairs granted legal status to C.A. Peñarol, including the recognition to the institution as a CURCC's continuity. Nevertheless, there are records of football matches played by CURCC until its dissolution.

Controversy began in 1941, when Peñarol celebrated its 50° anniversary. Some articles published on local newspaper El País stated that Peñarol was established as an entity with no relation to CURCC. When Peñarol modified its statutes in 1957 and 1958, the Government of Uruguay gave its approval to the text but did not adopt a position on the origins and age of the club.

The position about Peñarol as a new institution born in 1913 has been supported by Peñarol's rival Club Nacional de Football since 1991, when the Carbonero celebrated its 100th. anniversary. The club stated that CURCC and Peñarol coexisted for a period of at least two years until the CURCC dissolved in 1915. According to Nacional's position, on June 2, 1913, the CURCC assembly rejected a change of statute by which the club would change its name to "CURCC (Peñarol)".

On the other hand, Peñarol states that on December 13, 1913, CURCC approved to transfer the competitive football section to some members under the name "CURCC Peñarol", exempting itself from financial or administrative operations of it. Peñarol also alleges that FIFA, UEFA and CONMEBOL congratulated the club for its 120th. anniversary in 2011.

The CURCC continued its recreational football operations until its formal dissolution on January 22, 1915. During this period, CURCC and Club Atlético Peñarol coexisted as separate entities with distinct presidents (Pedro Sedgfield and Jorge Clulow, respectively) and headquarters. Historical records indicate that both clubs fielded teams and played separate football matches on the exact same days in April and July 1914. Furthermore, William "Guillermo" Davies —CURCC's captain and the scorer of the club's first official goal— remained with the CURCC and did not join Peñarol for the 1914 Uruguayan Championship, ultimately choosing to retire from football when the CURCC dissolved in 1915.

== Rivalries ==
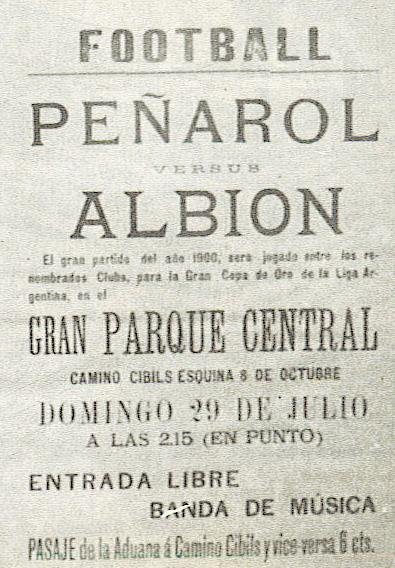
Poster of a match between CURCC and Albion in 1900

CURCC's first main rival was Albion, with which the club had the longest rivalry during late 19th century.

Albion was the first team CURCC played a football match, more precisely on May 25, 1892. Albion defeated CURCC by 3–2. Nevertheless, CURCC achieved a long victory in the second game vs. Albion. Then it would be discovered that two of CURCC's members, Woosey and Sagehorn, were also founders of Albion. As a result, Albion expelled them.

By 1896, Albion was the strongest team in Uruguay, being defeated only once after 19 matches played. Between 1897 and 1898, CURCC played against Albion 6 times, winning 2, and losing 3.

On March 22, 1901, Nacional' request to enter the Uruguayan Football Association was approved. Since then, the club would win many championships, becoming CURCC's (and then Peñarol) main rival.

== Symbols ==
=== Colors ===
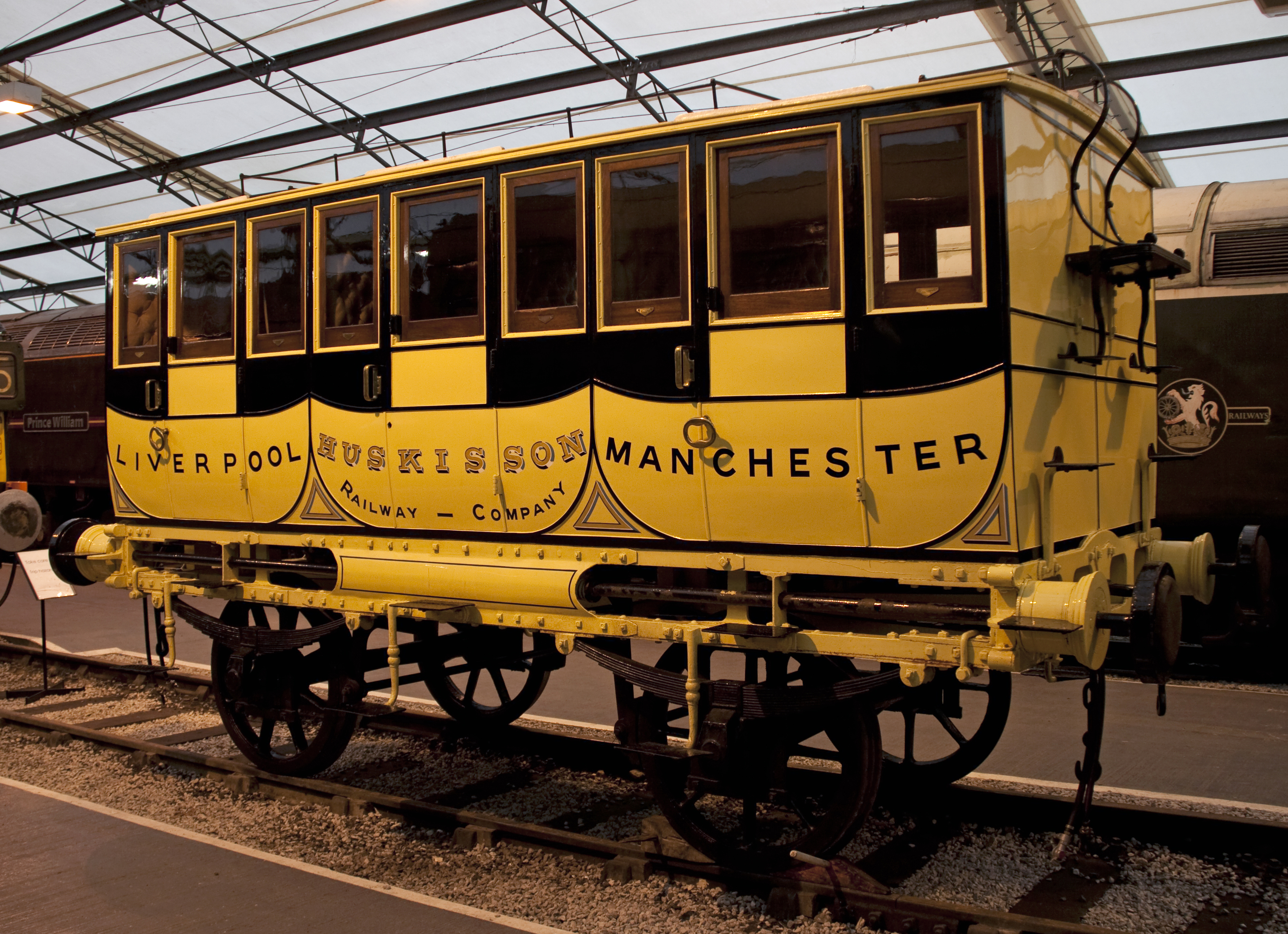
The Rocket locomotive served as inspiration for the colors

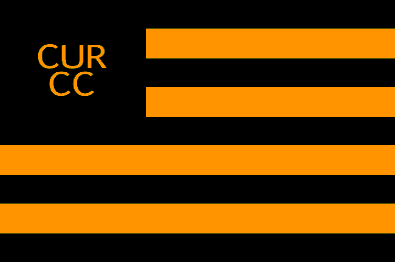
Flag of the club

In October 1829 the Rainhill Trials, a competition honoring Queen Victoria, was held in London. Several locomotives were exhibited to define which would run the Liverpool and Manchester Railway route. Although 10 locomotives were entered, only five would be tested for the competition. They were: Rocket, designed by George & Robert Stephenson, made in gold and black colors; Sans Pareil by Timothy Hackworth, Novelty built by Swedish John Ericsson, painted in blue and gold as the flag of Sweden; Perseverance, and Cycloped, built by Thomas Shaw Brandreth.

The Rocket was the only locomotive that completed the competition, therefore it was proclaimed winner. The Rocket had been painted in black (the color of coal that fueled the machine) and yellow (for King George IV). When Central Uruguay Railway began to operate in Uruguay, the club adopted the colors that identified the company.

The club generated influence in the election of other neighboring clubs, for example, Club Almirante Brown of Argentina. The choice of its colors in 1912 was fortuitous, since there was no store in San Justo that had a complete set of shirts, the purchase was entrusted to one of its founding directors, Mr. Enrique Premoli, who worked In Buenos Aires city. Despite having been recommended some designs, only one house had for sale a complete set of t-shirts, those of Central Uruguay Railway Cricket Club of Montevideo, with seven wide yellow-orange and black stripes on the front; the Argentine team thus adopted these colors.

=== Uniform ===
Since the club was established, its colors have been dark yellow and black. They were inspired by the Rocket locomotive that had been designed by George Stephenson in 1829.

=== Kit evolution ===
1891–96	1896–1910	1910–13	1914–15

== Titles ==
=== Domestic ===
- Primera División (5): 1900, 1901, 1905, 1907, 1911
- Copa de Competencia (7): 1901, 1902, 1904, 1905, 1907, 1909, 1910
- Copa de Honor (3): 1907, 1909, 1911

=== International ===
- Copa de Honor Cousenier (2): 1909, 1911

== See also ==
- Peñarol
- Central Uruguay Railway
- Club Almirante Brown
