= Copa de Honor (Uruguay) =

- Organiser(s): AUF
- Founded: 1905
- Abolished: 1920; 106 years ago
- Region: Uruguay
- Qualifier for: Copa de Honor Cousenier
- Related competitions: Copa Honor (Arg)
- Last champions: Universal (1920)
- Most championships: Nacional (7 titles)

The Copa de Honor was a Uruguayan football cup competition organized by the Uruguayan Football Association from 1905 to 1920. The champion of this tournament qualified to play the Copa de Honor Cousenier against the Argentine winner of Copa de Honor Municipalidad de Buenos Aires.

== List of champions ==
Ed.	Year	Champion	Runner-up
1	1905	Nacional	Montevideo Wanderers
2	1906	Nacional	CURCC
3	1907	CURCC	
4	1908	Montevideo Wanderers	Nacional
5	1909	CURCC	
6	1910	Montevideo Wanderers	Central
7	1911	CURCC	
8	1912	River Plate	
9	1913	Nacional	Montevideo Wanderers
10	1914	Nacional	Peñarol
11	1915	Nacional	Universal
12	1916	Nacional	Central
13	1917	Nacional	Peñarol
14	1918	Peñarol	Nacional
15	1920	Universal	
16	1922	(Not finished)	

== Titles by team ==
Team	Titles	Years won
Nacional	7	1905, 1906, 1913, 1914, 1915, 1916, 1917
CURCC / Peñarol (Note: With Peñarol being recognised as a CURCC's continuity by FIFA, the club included the championships won by CURCC in its own honours. Controversy exists on the date of the founding of C.A. Peñarol. The club's official position assumes a change of name of CURCC (founded on December 28, 1891). On the other hand, some historians state that "C.A. Peñarol" was established on December 13, 1913.)	4	1907, 1909, 1911, 1918
Montevideo Wanderers	2	1908, 1910
River Plate	1	1912
Universal	1	1920

== See also ==
- Copa de Honor Cousenier
- Copa de Honor Municipalidad de Buenos Aires
