= Uruguay national football team results (1902–1929) =

This is a list of the Uruguay national football team results since 1902 to 1929.

== 1900s ==
=== 1902 ===
20 July 1902 Friendly	Uruguay	0–6	Argentina	Montevideo
		Report	Dickinson 3'; Arímalo 31' (o.g.); Morgan 64'; Urioste 66' (o.g.); Anderson 71'; Jo. Brown 86'	Stadium: Campo del Albion; Attendance: 8,000; Referee: Roberto W. Ruud (Argentina)

=== 1903 ===
13 September 1903 Friendly	Argentina	2–3	Uruguay	Buenos Aires
	Jo. Brown 51', 80'	Report	C. Céspedes 21', 58'; B. Céspedes 61'	Stadium: Sociedad Hípica Argentina; Attendance: 4,500; Referee: Roberto W. Ruud (Argentina)

=== 1905 ===
15 August 1905 Copa Lipton	Argentina	0–0	Uruguay	Buenos Aires
		Report		Stadium: Sociedad Sportiva Argentina; Referee: Guillermo A. Jordan (Argentina)

=== 1906 ===
18 July 1906 Friendly	Uruguay	1–6	South Africa	Montevideo
	Rincón 27'	Report	Tyler 17'; Mason 43', 82', 89'; Hartigan 49', 79'	Stadium: Estadio Gran Parque Central; Attendance: 6,000; Referee: Guillermo McFarlane (Uruguay)

15 August 1906 Copa Lipton	Uruguay	0–2	Argentina	Montevideo
		Report	A. Brown 28'; González 85'	Stadium: Estadio Gran Parque Central; Attendance: 5,000; Referee: Guillermo McFarlane (Uruguay)

21 October 1906 Copa Newton	Argentina	2–1	Uruguay	Buenos Aires
	Watson Hutton 15'; El. Brown 80'	Report	Peralta 87'	Stadium: Sociedad Sportiva Argentina; Attendance: 4,000; Referee: Guillermo A. Jordan (Argentina)

=== 1907 ===
15 August 1907 Copa Lipton	Argentina	2–1	Uruguay	Buenos Aires
	El. Brown 33'; Demarchi 48' (o.g.)	Report	Zibechi 87'	Stadium: CA Estudiantes; Attendance: 7,000; Referee: Guillermo E. Leslie (Argentina)

6 October 1907 Copa Newton	Uruguay	1–2	Argentina	Montevideo
	Zibechi 55'	Report	Malbrán 27', 59'	Stadium: Estadio Gran Parque Central; Attendance: 9,000; Referee: Cecil B. Poole (Uruguay)

=== 1908 ===
15 August 1908 Copa Lipton	Uruguay	2–2	Argentina	Montevideo
	Zumarán 28'; Bertone 75'	Report	Er. Brown 22'; Susan 60'	Stadium: Estadio Gran Parque Central; Attendance: 7,000; Referee: León Peyrou (Uruguay)

13 September 1908 Copa Newton	Argentina	2–1	Uruguay	Buenos Aires
	El. Brown 40'; Watson Hutton 73' (pen.)	Report	Brachi 82'	Stadium: Gimnasia y Esgrima; Attendance: 6,700; Referee: Mariano Reyna (Argentina)

4 October 1908 Copa Premier Honor Argentino	Argentina	0–1	Uruguay	Buenos Aires
		Report	Brachi 82'	Stadium: Gimnasia y Esgrima; Attendance: 7,200; Referee: Mariano Reyna (Argentina)

=== 1909 ===
15 August 1909 Copa Lipton	Argentina	2–1	Uruguay	Buenos Aires
	Watson Hutton 25'; El. Brown 26'	Report	Zumarán 88'	Stadium: CA Estudiantes; Attendance: 4,000; Referee: Guillermo A. Jordan (Argentina)

19 September 1909 Copa Newton	Uruguay	2–2	Argentina	Montevideo
	Raymonda 59'; Buck 68'	Report	Viale 2'; García 9' (o.g.)	Stadium: Estadio Belvedere; Attendance: 9,000; Referee: Juan H. Dall Orto (Uruguay)

10 October 1909 Copa Premier Honor Argentino	Argentina	3–1	Uruguay	Buenos Aires
	A. Brown 3', 65'; Jo. Brown 13' (pen.)	Report	Raymonda 35'	Stadium: Gimnasia y Esgrima; Attendance: 6,500; Referee: Apeles Bordabeherea (Uruguay)

== 1910s ==
=== 1910 ===
29 May 1910 Copa Centenario Revolución de Mayo	Uruguay	3–0	Chile	Buenos Aires
	Piendibene 6'; Brachi 75'; Buck 85'	Report		Stadium: Colegiales; Attendance: 6,000; Referee: José C. Susan (Argentina)

12 June 1910 Copa Centenario Revolución de Mayo	Argentina	4–1	Uruguay	Buenos Aires
	Viale 15'; Hayes 43'; Watson Hutton 50'; Susán 64'	Report	Piendibene 58'	Stadium: Gimnasia y Esgrima; Attendance: 8,500; Referee: Armando Bergalli (Chile)

15 August 1910 Copa Lipton	Uruguay	3–1	Argentina	Montevideo
	Dacal 22'; Zibechi 49'; Scarone 63'	Report	Hayes 71'	Stadium: Estadio Belvedere; Attendance: 8,000; Referee: León Peyrou (Uruguay)

13 November 1910 Copa Premier Honor Argentino	Argentina	1–1	Uruguay	Buenos Aires
	M. González 65'	Report	Piendibene 49'	Stadium: Gimnasia y Esgrima; Attendance: 5,000; Referee: Héctor Alfano (Argentina)

27 November 1910 Copa Premier Honor Argentino	Argentina	2–6	Uruguay	Buenos Aires
	M. González 41'; Viale 70'	Report	Quaglia 4'; Seoane 35', 65'; Piendibene 37'; Scarone 40', 44'	Stadium: Gimnasia y Esgrima; Attendance: 12,000; Referee: Héctor Alfano (Argentina)

=== 1911 ===
15 August 1911 Copa Lipton	Argentina	0–2	Uruguay	Buenos Aires
		Report	Piendibene 84'; Romano 73'	Stadium: Gimnasia y Esgrima; Attendance: 15,000; Referee: Héctor Alfano (Argentina)

17 September 1911 Copa Newton	Uruguay	2–3	Argentina	Montevideo
	Canavessi 58'; Romano 60'	Report	A. Brown 31'; El. Brown 54', 75'	Stadium: Estadio Gran Parque Central; Attendance: 15,000; Referee: Álvaro Saralegui (Uruguay)

8 October 1911 Copa Premier Honor Uruguayo	Uruguay	1–1	Argentina	Montevideo
	Piendibene 68'	Report	Watson Hutton 21'	Stadium: Estadio Gran Parque Central; Attendance: 12,000; Referee: León Peyrou (Uruguay)

22 October 1911 Copa Premier Honor Argentino	Argentina	2–0	Uruguay	Buenos Aires
	Piaggio 30', 40'	Report		Stadium: Gimnasia y Esgrima; Attendance: 18,000; Referee: Héctor Alfano (Argentina)

29 October 1911 Copa Premier Honor Uruguayo	Uruguay	3–0	Argentina	Montevideo
	Piendibene 13', 74'; Canavessi 81'	Report		Stadium: Estadio Gran Parque Central; Referee: Juan H. Dall Orto (Uruguay)

=== 1912 ===
25 February 1912 Friendly	Argentina	2–0	Uruguay	Avellaneda
	Ohaco 39'; Hayes 78'	Report		Stadium: Estadio Crucecita; Referee: Héctor Alfano (Argentina)

15 August 1912 Copa Lipton	Uruguay	2–0	Argentina	Montevideo
	Dacal 24'; Scarone 56'	Report		Stadium: Estadio Gran Parque Central; Attendance: 18,000; Referee: Álvaro Saralegui (Uruguay)

25 August 1912 Copa Premier Honor Uruguayo	Uruguay	3–0	Argentina	Montevideo
	Dacal 33'; Scarone 43'; Romano 77'	Report		Stadium: Estadio Gran Parque Central; Attendance: 18,000; Referee: León Peyrou (Uruguay)

22 September 1912 Copa Premier Honor Argentino	Argentina	0–1	Uruguay	Buenos Aires
		Report	Reparaz 79' (o.g.)	Stadium: Gimnasia y Esgrima; Referee: Guillermo A. Jordan (Argentina)

6 October 1912 Copa Newton	Argentina	3–3	Uruguay	Avellaneda
	Watson Hutton 44'; Viale 61', 69'	Report	Romano 17'; Dacal 38'; Scarone 78'	Stadium: Estadio Racing Club; Referee: Héctor Alfano (Argentina)

1 December 1912 Friendly	Uruguay	1–3 (a.e.t.)	Argentina	Montevideo
	Scarone 25'	Report	M. González 24'; Marcovecchio 92'; Viale 114'	Stadium: Estadio Gran Parque Central; Referee: Juan Bartolazzi (Argentina)

=== 1913 ===
27 April 1913 Friendly	Uruguay	4–0	Argentina	Montevideo
	Bastos 1', 73'; Insargaray 7'; Porte 15'	Report		Stadium: Estadio Gran Parque Central; Referee: Juan Bartolazzi (Argentina)
Note: The friendly was organized by the dissident Federación Argentina de Football and is not recognized as official by AFA.

27 April 1913 Friendly	Argentina	0–0	Uruguay	Buenos Aires
		Report		Stadium: Gimnasia y Esgrima; Referee: Guillermo A. Jordan (Argentina)
Note: This match was held at the same time as the match in Montevideo, but with different teams.

15 June 1913 Copa Presidente Roque Sáenz Peña	Argentina	1–1	Uruguay	Avellaneda
	M. González 83'	Report	Gorla 3'	Stadium: Estadio Racing Club; Referee: Héctor Alfano (Argentina)

9 July 1913 Copa Presidente Roque Sáenz Peña	Argentina	2–1	Uruguay	Avellaneda
	M. González 25', 79'	Report	Bastos 7'	Stadium: Estadio Racing Club; Referee: Héctor Alfano (Argentina)

13 July 1913 Friendly	Uruguay	5–4	Argentina	Montevideo
	Zibechi 5'; Legarburo 15'; Pérez 53'; Gorla 85', 90'	Report	Guidi 9', 28', 30'; Dannaher 59'	Stadium: Estadio Gran Parque Central; Referee: Luis Carbone (Uruguay)
Note: The friendly was organized by the dissident Federación Argentina de Football and is not recognized as official by AFA.

13 July 1913 Friendly	Argentina	3–3	Uruguay	Buenos Aires
	Giamondi 35', 37'; Piaggio 50'	Report	Castro 44', 87'; Bastos 70'	Stadium: Gimnasia y Esgrima; Referee: Carlos Aerts (Argentina)
Note: This match was held at the same time as the match in Montevideo, but with different teams.

15 August 1913 Copa Lipton	Argentina	4–0	Uruguay	Avellaneda
	Susán 31', 44', 76', 89'	Report		Stadium: Estadio Racing Club; Referee: José C. Susan (Argentina)

31 August 1913 Copa Premier Honor Argentino	Argentina	2–0	Uruguay	Buenos Aires
	Hayes 76'; Polimeni 81'	Report		Stadium: Gimnasia y Esgrima; Referee: D.A. Duchini (Argentina)

28 September 1913 Friendly	Argentina	4–0	Uruguay	Buenos Aires
	Dannaher; Polimeni	Report		Stadium: Gimnasia y Esgrima; Referee: D.A. Duchini (Argentina)
Note: The friendly was organized by the dissident Federación Argentina de Football and is not recognized as official by AFA.

5 October 1913 Copa Premier Honor Uruguayo	Uruguay	1–0	Argentina	Montevideo
	Vallarino 80'	Report		Stadium: Estadio Gran Parque Central; Referee: Hugo Gondra (Argentina)

26 October 1913 Copa Newton	Uruguay	1–0	Argentina	Montevideo
	Gorla 62'	Report		Stadium: Estadio Gran Parque Central; Referee: Hugo Gondra (Argentina)

=== 1914 ===
30 August 1914 Copa Premier Honor Uruguayo	Uruguay	3–2	Argentina	Montevideo
	Vallarino 49'; Dacal 29'; Bruno 53' (o.g.)	Report	Calomino 12'; Dannaher 81'	Stadium: Estadio Gran Parque Central; Referee: Luis Farinasso (Uruguay)

13 September 1914 Copa Premier Honor Argentino	Argentina	2–1	Uruguay	Buenos Aires
	Gallardo 40'; Lazcano 71'	Report	Vallarino 51'	Stadium: Gimnasia y Esgrima; Referee: Ángel Landoni (Uruguay)

15 November 1914 Friendly	Uruguay	3–2	Argentina	Montevideo
	Scarone; Piendibene; Varela	Report	Cazenave; Izaguirre	Stadium: Estadio Gran Parque Central; Attendance: 6,000; Referee: M. Cook (Argentina)
Note: The friendly was organized by the dissident Federación Argentina de Football and is not recognized as official by AFA.

22 November 1914 Friendly	Argentina	3–0	Uruguay	Buenos Aires
	Cazenave 5', 35'; Cappelletti 45'	Report		Stadium: Gimnasia y Esgrima; Referee: León Peyrou (Uruguay)
Note: The friendly was organized by the dissident Federación Argentina de Football and is not recognized as official by AFA.

=== 1915 ===
28 March 1915 Friendly	Argentina	0–0	Uruguay	Buenos Aires
		Report		Stadium: Gimnasia y Esgrima; Referee: Héctor Alfano (Argentina)

18 July 1915 Copa Premier Honor Uruguayo	Uruguay	2–3	Argentina	Montevideo
	Dacal 59'; Lázaro 79'	Report	Saporiti 17' (o.g.); Marcovecchio 75'; Hayes 89'	Stadium: Estadio Gran Parque Central; Referee: Charles Williams (Argentina)

15 August 1915 Copa Lipton	Argentina	2–1	Uruguay	Buenos Aires
	Marcovecchio 62'; Hayes 75'	Report	Piendibene 25'	Stadium: Gimnasia y Esgrima; Referee: Héctor Alfano (Argentina)

12 September 1915 Copa Newton	Uruguay	2–0	Argentina	Montevideo
	Piendibene 2', 62'	Report		Stadium: Estadio Gran Parque Central; Referee: Charles Williams (Argentina)

=== 1916 ===
2 July 1916 South American Championship	Uruguay	4–0	Chile	Buenos Aires
	Piendibene 44', 75'; Gradín 55', 70'	Report		Stadium: Gimnasia y Esgrima; Attendance: 30,000; Referee: Hugo Gronda (Argentina)

12 July 1916 South American Championship	Uruguay	2–1	Brazil	Buenos Aires
	Gradín 58'; Tognola 77'	Report	Friedenreich 8'	Stadium: Gimnasia y Esgrima; Attendance: 12,000; Referee: Carlos Fanta (Chile)

14 July 1916 Friendly	Uruguay	4–1	Chile	Montevideo
	Bastos 37', 56'; Scarone 70'; Dacal 81'	Report	France 18'	Stadium: Estadio Gran Parque Central; Referee: Ángel Minoli (Uruguay)

17 July 1916 South American Championship	Argentina	0–0	Uruguay	Avellaneda
		Report		Stadium: Estadio Racing Club; Attendance: 17,000; Referee: Carlos Fanta (Chile)

18 July 1916 Friendly	Uruguay	0–1	Brazil	Montevideo
		Report	Mimi Sodré 23'	Stadium: Estadio Gran Parque Central; Attendance: 12,000; Referee: Carlos Fanta (Chile)

15 August 1916 Copa Lipton	Uruguay	1–2	Argentina	Montevideo
	Gradín 28'	Report	E. Hayes 35'; Laiolo 80'	Stadium: Estadio Gran Parque Central; Referee: José Di Lucca (Uruguay)

15 August 1916 Copa Newton	Argentina	3–1	Uruguay	Avellaneda
	Ohaco 48', 71'; Hiller 87'	Report	Farinasso 23'	Stadium: Estadio Racing Club; Referee: Luis Gil (Argentina)
Note: This match was held at the same time as the match in Montevideo, but with different teams.

1 October 1916 Copa Premier Honor Uruguayo	Uruguay	0–1	Argentina	Montevideo
		Report	Badalini 3'	Stadium: Estadio Belvedere; Referee: Ángel Minoli (Uruguay)

1 October 1916 Copa Círculo de la Prensa	Argentina	7–2	Uruguay	Avellaneda
	Simmons 8'; Hiller 20', 50', 71'; Canavery 60'; E. Hayes 62'; Cabano 70'	Report	Buffoni 51'; Mongelar 75'	Stadium: Estadio Racing Club; Referee: Guillermo Jordan (Argentina)
Note: This match was held at the same time as the match in Montevideo, but with different teams.

29 October 1916 Copa Círculo de la Prensa	Uruguay	3–1	Argentina	Montevideo
	Gradín 30', 65'; Mongelar 55'	Report	Guidi 33'	Stadium: Estadio Gran Parque Central; Referee: Ricardo Vallarino (Uruguay)

=== 1917 ===
18 July 1917 Copa Premier Honor Uruguayo	Uruguay	0–2	Argentina	Montevideo
		Report	Marcovecchio 30', 38'	Stadium: Estadio Gran Parque Central; Referee: Álvaro Saralegui (Uruguay)

15 August 1917 Copa Lipton	Argentina	1–0	Uruguay	Avellaneda
	Calomino 5'	Report		Stadium: Estadio Racing Club; Referee: Germán Guassone (Argentina)

2 September 1917 Copa Newton	Uruguay	1–0	Argentina	Montevideo
	Romano 83'	Report		Stadium: Estadio Gran Parque Central; Referee: Ricardo Vallarino (Uruguay)

30 September 1917 South American Championship	Uruguay	4–0	Chile	Montevideo
	C.Scarone 20', 62' (pen.); Romano 44', 75'	Report		Stadium: Parque Pereira; Attendance: 22,000; Referee: Germán Guassone (Argentina)

17 October 1917 South American Championship	Uruguay	4–0	Brazil	Montevideo
	H. Scarone 8'; Romano 17', 77'; C. Scarone 86'	Report		Stadium: Parque Pereira; Attendance: 21,000; Referee: Germán Guassone (Argentina)

14 October 1917 South American Championship	Uruguay	1–0	Argentina	Montevideo
	H. Scarone 62'	Report		Stadium: Parque Pereira; Attendance: 40,000; Referee: Juan Livingstone (Chile)

16 October 1917 Friendly	Uruguay	3–1	Brazil	Montevideo
	Grecco 20', 30'; Gradín 43'	Report	Neco 40'	Stadium: Parque Pereira; Referee: Carlos Fanta (Chile)

=== 1918 ===
18 July 1918 Copa Premier Honor Uruguayo	Uruguay	1–1	Argentina	Montevideo
	Gradín 7'	Report	Rofrano 5'	Stadium: Parque Pereira; Referee: Álvaro Saralegui (Uruguay)

28 July 1918 Copa Premier Honor Uruguayo	Uruguay	3–1	Argentina	Montevideo
	H. Scarone 7'; Romano 9', 64'	Report	García 23'	Stadium: Parque Pereira; Referee: Ángel Minoli (Uruguay)

15 August 1918 Copa Premier Honor Argentino	Argentina	0–0	Uruguay	Buenos Aires
		Report		Stadium: Gimnasia y Esgrima; Referee: Calixto Gardi (Argentina)

25 August 1918 Copa Premier Honor Argentino	Argentina	2–1	Uruguay	Buenos Aires
	Martín 10', 14'	Report	Somma 18'	Stadium: Gimnasia y Esgrima; Referee: Calixto Gardi (Argentina)

20 September 1918 Copa Lipton	Uruguay	1–1	Argentina	Montevideo
	C. Scarone 61'	Report	Calandra 50'	Stadium: Parque Pereira; Referee: Emilio Scoteguazza (Uruguay)

29 September 1918 Copa Newton	Argentina	2–0	Uruguay	Buenos Aires
	Vivaldo 22'; Blanco 35'	Report		Stadium: Gimnasia y Esgrima; Referee: Germán Guassone (Argentina)

=== 1919 ===
13 May 1919 South American Championship	Uruguay	3–2	Argentina	Rio de Janeiro
	C. Scarone 19'; H. Scarone 23'; Gradín 85'	Report	Izaguirre 34'; Varela 79' (o.g.)	Stadium: Estádio das Laranjeiras; Attendance: 18,000; Referee: Robert Todd (England)

17 May 1919 South American Championship	Uruguay	2–0	Chile	Rio de Janeiro
	C. Scarone 31'; J. Pérez 43'	Report		Stadium: Estádio das Laranjeiras; Attendance: 8,000; Referee: Adílton Ponteado (Brazil)

26 May 1919 South American Championship	Brazil	2–2	Uruguay	Rio de Janeiro
	Neco 29', 63'	Report	Gradín 13'; C. Scarone 17'	Stadium: Estádio das Laranjeiras; Attendance: 23,000; Referee: Robert Todd (England)

29 May 1919 South American Championship	Brazil	1–0 (a.e.t.)	Uruguay	Rio de Janeiro
	Friedenreich 122'	Report		Stadium: Estádio das Laranjeiras; Attendance: 35,000; Referee: Juan P. Barbera (Argentina)

18 July 1919 Copa Premier Honor Uruguayo	Uruguay	4–1	Argentina	Montevideo
	H. Scarone 1', 22'; Pérez 17'; Romano 24'	Report	Hayes 83'	Stadium: Parque Pereira; Referee: Martín Aphesteguy (Uruguay)

24 August 1919 Copa Newton	Uruguay	2–1	Argentina	Montevideo
	Recanatini 16' (o.g.); Castagnola 27' (o.g.)	Report	Olazar 55'	Stadium: Parque Pereira; Referee: Ángel Minoli (Uruguay)

7 September 1919 Copa Lipton	Argentina	1–2	Uruguay	Buenos Aires
	Badalini 56'	Report	H. Scarone 30', 42'	Stadium: Gimnasia y Esgrima; Referee: Ricardo Palma (Argentina)

19 October 1919 Copa Premier Honor Argentino	Argentina	6–1	Uruguay	Buenos Aires
	Libonatti 11', 80', 83'; Celli 63'; Vivaldo 68'; Chavín 73'	Report	Fraga 35'	Stadium: Gimnasia y Esgrima; Referee: Juan José Rithner (Argentina)

7 December 1919 Copa Círculo de la Prensa	Uruguay	4–2	Argentina	Montevideo
	Piendibene 18', 47', 79'; H. Scarone 58'	Report	Libonatti 51'; Badalini 67'	Stadium: Parque Pereira; Referee: Ricardo Vallarino (Uruguay)

== 1920s ==
=== 1920 ===
18 July 1920 Copa Premier Honor Uruguayo	Uruguay	4–1	Argentina	Montevideo
	H. Scarone 18'; Romano 56'	Report	Hayes 83'	Stadium: Estadio Gran Parque Central; Referee: Martín Aphesteguy (Uruguay)

25 July 1920 Copa Newton	Argentina	1–3	Uruguay	Buenos Aires
	Clarcke 1'	Report	Romano 6'; Somma 33'; Piendibene 85'	Stadium: Estadio Sportivo Barracas; Referee: Calixto Gardi (Argentina)

8 August 1920 Copa Premier Honor Argentino	Argentina	1–0	Uruguay	Buenos Aires
	Calomino 86' (pen.)	Report		Stadium: Estadio Sportivo Barracas; Referee: Fernando Diez (Argentina)

12 September 1920 South American Championship	Argentina	1–1	Uruguay	Viña del Mar
	Echeverría 75'	Report	Piendibene 10'	Stadium: Estadio Valparaíso Sporting Club; Attendance: 17,000; Referee: Francisco Jiménez (Chile)

18 September 1920 South American Championship	Uruguay	6–0	Brazil	Viña del Mar
	Romano 23', 60'; Urdinarán 26' (pen.); Pérez 29', 65'; Campolo 48'	Report		Stadium: Estadio Valparaíso Sporting Club; Attendance: 9,000; Referee: Carlos Fanta (Chile)

26 September 1920 South American Championship	Uruguay	2–1	Chile	Viña del Mar
	Romano 37'; Pérez 65'	Report	Domínguez 60'	Stadium: Estadio Valparaíso Sporting Club; Attendance: 16,000; Referee: Carlos Fanta (Chile)

=== 1921 ===
9 October 1921 South American Championship	Paraguay	2–1	Uruguay	Buenos Aires
	Rivas 9'; López 66'	Report	Piendibene 83'	Stadium: Estadio Sportivo Barracas; Attendance: 12,000; Referee: Gerónimo Rapossi (Argentina)

23 October 1921 South American Championship	Uruguay	2–1	Brazil	Buenos Aires
	Romano 1', 8'	Report	Zezé I 53'	Stadium: Estadio Sportivo Barracas; Attendance: 10,000; Referee: Víctor Cabañas Saguier (Paraguay)

30 October 1921 South American Championship	Argentina	1–0	Uruguay	Buenos Aires
	Libonatti 57'	Report		Stadium: Estadio Sportivo Barracas; Attendance: 40,000; Referee: Pedro Santos (Brazil)

2 November 1921 Friendly	Uruguay	4–2	Paraguay	Montevideo
	Buffoni 14', 22', 53'; Campolo 49'	Report	Zelada 64'; López 85'	Stadium: Estadio Gran Parque Central; Attendance: 8,000; Referee: Aurelio San Martín (Argentina)

=== 1922 ===
23 September 1922 South American Championship	Uruguay	2–0	Chile	Rio de Janeiro
	Heguy 10'; Urdinarán 19' (pen.)	Report		Stadium: Estádio das Laranjeiras; Attendance: 12,000; Referee: Francisco Andreu (Paraguay)

1 October 1922 South American Championship	Brazil	0–0	Uruguay	Rio de Janeiro
		Report		Stadium: Estádio das Laranjeiras; Attendance: 23,000; Referee: Servando Pérez (Argentina)

8 October 1922 South American Championship	Uruguay	1–0	Argentina	Rio de Janeiro
	Buffoni 43'	Report		Stadium: Estádio das Laranjeiras; Attendance: 14,000; Referee: Pedro Santos (Brazil)

12 October 1922 South American Championship	Paraguay	1–0	Uruguay	Rio de Janeiro
	Elizeche 7'	Report		Stadium: Estádio das Laranjeiras; Attendance: 3,000; Referee: Pedro Santos (Brazil)

12 November 1922 Copa Lipton	Uruguay	1–0	Argentina	Montevideo
	Romano 26'	Report		Stadium: Estadio Gran Parque Central; Referee: Ricardo Vallarino (Uruguay)

10 December 1922 Copa Premier Honor Uruguayo	Uruguay	1–0	Argentina	Montevideo
	C. Scarone 5'	Report		Stadium: Estadio Gran Parque Central; Referee: Aurelio San Martín (Argentina)

17 December 1922 Copa Newton	Argentina	2–2	Uruguay	Buenos Aires
	Badalini 6', 18'	Report	C. Scarone 13'; Bérgolo 56'	Stadium: Estadio Sportivo Barracas; Referee: Gerónimo Rapossi (Argentina)

=== 1923 ===
24 June 1923 Copa Lipton	Argentina	0–0	Uruguay	Buenos Aires
		Report		Stadium: Estadio Sportivo Barracas; Attendance: 30,000; Referee: Gerónimo Rapossi (Argentina)

15 July 1923 Copa Ministerio de las Relaciones Exteriores	Argentina	2–2	Uruguay	Buenos Aires
	Izaguirre 20'; Onzari 59'	Report	Zibechi 65'; Romano 72'	Stadium: Estadio Sportivo Barracas; Attendance: 25,000; Referee: Lorenzo Muzzio (Argentina)

22 July 1923 Copa Premier Honor Uruguayo	Uruguay	2–2	Argentina	Montevideo
	Romano 9'; Saldombide 15'	Report	Tarasconi 46'; Irurieta 53'	Stadium: Estadio Gran Parque Central; Attendance: 10,000; Referee: Ricardo Vallarino (Uruguay)

30 September 1923 Copa Premier Honor Uruguayo	Uruguay	0–2	Argentina	Montevideo
		Report	Saruppo 25'; López 33'	Stadium: Estadio Gran Parque Central; Attendance: 7,000; Referee: José Rami (Uruguay)

4 November 1923 South American Championship	Uruguay	2–0	Paraguay	Montevideo
	Scarone 11'; Petrone 87'	Report		Stadium: Estadio Gran Parque Central; Attendance: 20,000; Referee: Servando Pérez (Argentina)

25 November 1923 South American Championship	Uruguay	2–1	Brazil	Montevideo
	Petrone 56'; Cea 75'	Report	Nilo 59'	Stadium: Estadio Gran Parque Central; Attendance: 20,000; Referee: Servando Pérez (Argentina)

2 December 1923 South American Championship	Uruguay	2–0	Argentina	Montevideo
	Petrone 28'; Somma 88'	Report		Stadium: Estadio Gran Parque Central; Attendance: 22,000; Referee: Antônio Carneiro de Campos (Brazil)

=== 1924 ===
25 May 1924 Copa Newton	Uruguay	2–0	Argentina	Montevideo
	Figueroa 22'; Suffiotti 76'	Report		Stadium: Estadio Gran Parque Central; Referee: José Rami (Uruguay)
Note: This match was played at the same time as the one in Buenos Aires, with different teams, and was valid for the 1923 Copa Newton

25 May 1924 Copa Newton	Argentina	4–0	Uruguay	Montevideo
	Goicoechea 25', 30'; Aguirre 43', 73'	Report		Stadium: Estadio Gran Parque Central; Referee: Lorenzo Muzzio (Argentina)

26 May 1924 Summer Olympics	Uruguay	7–0	Kingdom of SCS	Colombes
	Vidal 20'; Scarone 23'; Cea 50', 80'; Petrone 35', 61'; Romano 58'	Report		Stadium: Stade Olympique; Attendance: 3,025; Referee: Georges Vallat (France)

29 May 1924 Summer Olympics	Uruguay	3–0	United States	Paris
	Petrone 10', 44'; Scarone 15'	Report		Stadium: Stade Bergeyre; Attendance: 10,455; Referee: Charles Barette (Belgium)

1 June 1924 Summer Olympics	France	1–5	Uruguay	Colombes
	Nicolas 12'	Report	Scarone 2', 24'; Petrone 58', 68'; Romano 83'	Stadium: Stade Olympique; Attendance: 30,868; Referee: Peder Christian Andersen (Norway)

6 June 1924 Summer Olympics	Uruguay	2–1	Netherlands	Colombes
	Cea 62'; Scarone 81' (pen.)	Report	Pijl 32'	Stadium: Stade Olympique; Attendance: 7,088; Referee: Georges Vallat (France)

9 June 1924 Summer Olympics	Uruguay	3–0	Switzerland	Colombes
	Petrone 9'; Cea 65'; Romano 82'	Report		Stadium: Stade Olympique; Attendance: 40,522; Referee: Marcel Slawik (France)

21 September 1924 Friendly	Uruguay	1–1	Argentina	Montevideo
	Urdinarán 18'	Report	Tarasconi 82'	Stadium: Estadio Gran Parque Central; Referee: Servando Pérez (Argentina)

2 October 1924 Friendly	Argentina	2–1	Uruguay	Buenos Aires
	Onzari 12'; Tarasconi 53'	Report	Cea 30'	Stadium: Estadio Sportivo Barracas; Referee: Ricardo Vallarino (Uruguay)
Note: Match originally held on 28 September and cancelled due to a pitch invasion

19 October 1924 South American Championship	Uruguay	5–0	Chile	Montevideo
	Petrone 40', 53', 88'; Zingone 73'; Romano 78'	Report		Stadium: Estadio Gran Parque Central; Attendance: 15,000; Referee: Eduardo Jara (Paraguay)

26 October 1924 South American Championship	Uruguay	3–1	Paraguay	Montevideo
	Petrone 28'; Romano 37'; Cea 53'	Report	Urbieta Sosa 77'	Stadium: Estadio Gran Parque Central; Attendance: 14,000; Referee: Alberto Parodi (Chile)

2 November 1924 South American Championship	Uruguay	0–0	Argentina	Montevideo
		Report		Stadium: Estadio Gran Parque Central; Attendance: 20,000; Referee: Carlos Fanta (Chile)

=== 1925 ===
14 July 1925 Friendly	Uruguay	0–1	Paraguay	Montevideo
		Report	López 32'	Stadium: Estadio Gran Parque Central; Referee: Aníbal Tejada (Uruguay)

18 July 1925 Friendly	Uruguay	0–1	Paraguay	Montevideo
		Report	Rivas 80'	Stadium: Estadio Gran Parque Central; Referee: Agustín Imbriago (Uruguay)

16 August 1925 Friendly	Paraguay	1–0	Uruguay	Asunción
	Rivas 77'	Report		Stadium: Puerto Sajonia; Referee: Manuel Chaparro (Uruguay)

19 August 1925 Friendly	Paraguay	0–1	Uruguay	Asunción
		Report	Bidegaín 25'	Stadium: Puerto Sajonia; Referee: Miranda (Uruguay)

22 August 1925 Friendly	Paraguay	0–0	Uruguay	Asunción
		Report		Stadium: Puerto Sajonia; Referee: José Cabañas Saguier (Uruguay)

=== 1926 ===
17 October 1926 South American Championship	Chile	1–3	Uruguay	Santiago
	Subiabre 65' (pen.)	Report	Borjas 22'; Castro 32'; Scarone 55'	Stadium: Estadio Sport de Ñuñoa; Attendance: 13,000; Referee: Pedro José Malbrán (Chile)

24 October 1926 South American Championship	Uruguay	2–0	Argentina	Santiago
	Borjas 22'; Castro 73'	Report		Stadium: Estadio Sport de Ñuñoa; Attendance: 15,000; Referee: Miguel Barbas (Uruguay)

28 October 1926 South American Championship	Uruguay	6–0	Bolivia	Santiago
	Scarone 9', 12', 28', 39', 81'; Romano 67'	Report		Stadium: Estadio Sport de Ñuñoa; Attendance: 8,000; Referee: Juan Pedro Barbera (Argentina)

1 November 1926 South American Championship	Uruguay	6–1	Paraguay	Santiago
	Castro 16', 23', 32', 72'; Saldombide 47' (pen.), 82'	Report	Fleitas Solich 58' (pen.)	Stadium: Estadio Sport de Ñuñoa; Attendance: 13,000; Referee: Francisco Jiménez (Chile)

=== 1927 ===
14 July 1927 Copa Newton	Uruguay	0–1	Argentina	Montevideo
		Report	Carricaberry 76'	Stadium: Estadio Gran Parque Central; Referee: Domingo Lombardi (Uruguay)

29 August 1927 Copa Lipton	Argentina	0–1	Uruguay	Buenos Aires
		Report	Scarone 75'	Stadium: Estadio Brandsen y Del Crucero; Referee: Servando Pérez (Argentina)

1 November 1927 South American Championship	Peru	0–4	Uruguay	Lima
		Report	Ulloa 49' (o.g.); Sacco 52', 71'; Castro 75'	Stadium: Estadio Nacional; Attendance: 22,000; Referee: Consolato Nay Foino (Argentina)

6 November 1927 South American Championship	Uruguay	9–0	Bolivia	Lima
	Petrone 18', 65', 81'; Figueroa 19', 67', 69'; Arremón 43'; Castro 68'; Scarone 86'	Report		Stadium: Estadio Nacional; Attendance: 6,000; Referee: Benjamín Fuentes (Peru)

20 November 1927 South American Championship	Argentina	3–2	Uruguay	Lima
	Recanatini 56' (pen.); Luna 70'; Canavesi 85' (o.g.)	Report	Scarone 33', 79'	Stadium: Estadio Nacional; Attendance: 26,000; Referee: David Turner (England)

10 December 1927 Friendly	Chile	2–3	Uruguay	Viña del Mar
	Alfaro 42', 75'	Report	Petrone 18'; Castro 60'; Scarone 63'	Stadium: Estadio Valparaíso Sporting Club; Referee: Alberto Sabugo (Chile)

=== 1928 ===
30 May 1928 Summer Olympics	Netherlands	0–2	Uruguay	Amsterdam
19:00		Report	Scarone 20'; Urdinarán 86'	Stadium: Olympic Stadium; Attendance: 27,730; Referee: John Langenus (Belgium)

3 June 1928 Summer Olympics	Uruguay	4–1	Germany	Amsterdam
16:00	Petrone 35', 39', 84'; Castro 63'	Report	Hofmann 81'	Stadium: Olympic Stadium; Attendance: 25,131; Referee: Youssuf Mohamed (Egypt)

7 June 1928 Summer Olympics	Uruguay	3–2	Italy	Amsterdam
19:00	Cea 17'; Campolo 28'; Scarone 31'	Report	Baloncieri 9'; Levratto 60'	Stadium: Olympic Stadium; Attendance: 15,230; Referee: Willem Eymers (Netherlands)

10 June 1928 Summer Olympics	Uruguay	1–1 (a.e.t.)	Argentina	Amsterdam
16:00	Petrone 23'	Report	Ferreira 50'	Stadium: Olympic Stadium; Attendance: 28,253; Referee: Johannes Mutters (Netherlands)

13 June 1928 Summer Olympics	Uruguay	2–1	Argentina	Amsterdam
19:00	Figueroa 17'; Scarone 73'	Report	Monti 28'	Stadium: Olympic Stadium; Attendance: 28,113; Referee: Johannes Mutters (Netherlands)

15 August 1928 Friendly	Paraguay	3–1	Uruguay	Asunción
	González 10'; Ortega 18'; Molinas 88'	Report	Mata 65'	Stadium: Puerto Sajonia

30 August 1928 Copa Newton	Argentina	1–0	Uruguay	Avellaneda
	Seoane 20'	Report		Stadium: Estadio Crucecita; Referee: Gerónimo Rapossi (Argentina)

21 September 1928 Copa Lipton	Uruguay	2–2	Argentina	Montevideo
	Píriz 56'; Petrone 89' (pen.)	Report	Maglio 12'; Alonso 76'	Stadium: Estadio Gran Parque Central; Referee: Aníbal Tejada (Uruguay)

=== 1929 ===
16 June 1929 Friendly	Uruguay	1–1	Argentina	Montevideo
	Carbone 42'	Report	Maglio 63'	Stadium: Estadio Gran Parque Central; Referee: José Galli (Argentina)

16 June 1929 Friendly	Argentina	2–0	Uruguay	Buenos Aires
	Peucelle 58'; Scopelli 76'	Report		Stadium: Estadio Gasómetro; Referee: Aníbal Tejada (Uruguay)
Note: This match was held at the same time as the match in Montevideo, but with different teams.

20 September 1929 Copa Newton	Uruguay	2–1	Argentina	Montevideo
	Castro 4'; Fernández 65'	Report		Stadium: Estadio Gran Parque Central; Referee: Domingo Lombardi (Uruguay)

28 September 1929 Copa Lipton	Argentina	0–0	Uruguay	Buenos Aires
		Report		Stadium: Estadio Gasómetro; Referee: Servando Pérez (Argentina)

1 November 1929 South American Championship	Paraguay	3–0	Uruguay	Buenos Aires
	González 16', 86'; Domínguez 55'	Report		Stadium: Estadio Alvear y Tagle; Attendance: 40,000; Referee: José Galli (Argentina)

11 November 1929 South American Championship	Uruguay	4–1	Peru	Buenos Aires
	Fernández 21', 29', 43'; Andrade 69'	Report	Lizarbe 81'	Stadium: Estadio Alvear y Tagle; Attendance: 22,000; Referee: Miguel Barba (Paraguay)

17 November 1929 South American Championship	Argentina	2–0	Uruguay	Buenos Aires
	Ferreira 14'; M. Evaristo 77'	Report		Stadium: Estadio Gasómetro; Attendance: 60,000; Referee: Miguel Barba (Paraguay)

== See also ==
- Uruguay national football team
