= Argentina national football team results (1902–1919) =

National football team results (1902–1919)

This page details the match results and statistics of the Argentina national football team from 1902 to 1919.

== Key ==
Key to matches

- Att.=Match attendance
- (H)=Home ground
- (A)=Away ground
- (N)=Neutral ground

Key to record by opponent

- Pld=Games played
- W=Games won
- D=Games drawn
- L=Games lost
- GF=Goals for
- GA=Goals against

== Results ==
Argentina's score is shown first in each case.

No.	Date	Venue	Opponents	Score	Competition	Argentina scorers	Att.	Ref.
1	20 July 1902	Paso del Molino, Montevideo (A)	Uruguay	6–0	Friendly	Dickinson, Arímalo (o.g.), Morgan, Carve Urioste (o.g.), Anderson, J. Brown	—	
2	13 September 1903	Sociedad Sportiva, Buenos Aires (H)	Uruguay	2–3	Friendly	J. Brown (2)	4,500	
3	15 August 1905	Sociedad Sportiva, Buenos Aires (H)	Uruguay	0–0 (a.e.t.)	Copa Lipton		—	
4	15 August 1906	Parque Central, Montevideo (A)	Uruguay	2–0	Copa Lipton	Watson Hutton, E. Brown	—	
5	21 October 1906	Sociedad Sportiva, Buenos Aires (H)	Uruguay	2–1	Copa Newton	Watson Hutton, E. Brown	—	
6	15 August 1907	CA Estudiantes, Buenos Aires (H) (Note: The stadium was located on Avenida Alvear (now "Av del Libertador") and Oro in the Palermo neighborhood of Buenos Aires.)	Uruguay	2–1	Copa Lipton	E. Brown, Jacobs	—	
7	6 October 1907	Parque Central, Montevideo (A)	Uruguay	2–1	Copa Newton	Malbrán (2)	—	
8	15 August 1908	Parque Central, Montevideo (A)	Uruguay	2–2	Copa Lipton	E. Brown, Susán	—	
9	13 September 1908	Estadio GEBA, Buenos Aires (H)	Uruguay	2–1	Copa Newton	E. Brown, Watson Hutton	—	
10	4 October 1908	Estadio GEBA, Buenos Aires (H)	Uruguay	0–1	Copa Premier Honor Argentino		—	
11	15 August 1909	Estadio GEBA, Buenos Aires (H)	Uruguay	2–1	Copa Lipton	Watson Hutton, E. Brown	—	
12	19 September 1909	Parque Belvedere, Montevideo (A)	Uruguay	2–2	Copa Newton	Viale, A. García (o.g.)	—	
13	10 October 1909	Estadio GEBA, Buenos Aires (H)	Uruguay	3–1	Copa Premier Honor Argentino	A. Brown (2), J. Brown	—	
14	27 May 1910	Belgrano, Buenos Aires (H)	Chile	3–1	Friendly	Viale, Susán, J. E. Hayes	6,200	
15	5 June 1910	Estadio GEBA, Buenos Aires (H)	Chile	5–1	Copa Centenario Revolución de Mayo	Viale, J. E. Hayes (2), Weiss, Susán	—	
16	12 June 1910	Estadio GEBA, Buenos Aires (H)	Uruguay	4–1	Copa Centenario Revolución de Mayo	Viale, J. E. Hayes, Watson Hutton, Susán	—	
17	15 August 1910	Parque Belvedere, Montevideo (A)	Uruguay	1–3	Copa Lipton	J. E. Hayes	—	
18	11 September 1910	Valparaiso Sporting Club, Viña del Mar (A)	Chile	0–3	Friendly		—	
19	13 November 1910	Estadio GEBA, Buenos Aires (H)	Uruguay	1–1 (a.e.t.)	Copa Premier Honor Argentino	M. González	—	
20	27 November 1910	Estadio GEBA, Buenos Aires (H)	Uruguay	2–6	Copa Premier Honor Argentino	M. González, Viale	—	
21	30 April 1911	Parque Belvedere, Montevideo (A)	Uruguay	2–1	Friendly	Unknown	—	
22	15 August 1911	Estadio GEBA, Buenos Aires (H)	Uruguay	0–2	Copa Lipton		—	
23	17 September 1911	Parque Central, Montevideo (A)	Uruguay	3–2	Copa Newton	A. Brown, E. Brown (2)	—	
24	8 October 1911	Parque Central, Montevideo (A)	Uruguay	1–1 (a.e.t.)	Copa Premier Honor Uruguayo	Watson Hutton	—	
25	22 October 1911	Estadio GEBA, Buenos Aires (H)	Uruguay	2–0	Copa Premier Honor Argentino	A. Piaggio (2)	—	
26	29 October 1911	Parque Central, Montevideo (A)	Uruguay	0–3	Copa Premier Honor Uruguayo		—	
27	25 February 1912	Estadio Crucecita, Avellaneda (H)	Uruguay	2–0	Friendly	Unknown	—	
28	15 August 1912	Parque Central, Montevideo (A)	Uruguay	0–2	Copa Lipton		—	
29	25 August 1912	Parque Central, Montevideo (A)	Uruguay	0–3	Copa Premier Honor Uruguayo		—	
30	22 September 1912	Estadio GEBA, Buenos Aires (H)	Uruguay	0–1	Copa Premier Honor Argentino		—	
31	6 October 1912	Estadio Racing Club, Avellaneda (H)	Uruguay	3–3 (a.e.t.)	Copa Newton	Watson Hutton, Viale (2)	—	
32	1 December 1912	Parque Central, Montevideo (A)	Uruguay	3–1	Montevideo Cup	Gonzalez, Marcovecchio, Viale	—	
33	15 June 1913	Estadio Racing Club, Avellaneda (H)	Uruguay	1–1 (a.e.t.)	Copa Presidente Roque Sáenz Peña	Gonzalez	—	
34	9 July 1913	Estadio Racing Club, Avellaneda (H)	Uruguay	2–1	Copa Presidente Roque Sáenz Peña	Gonzalez (2)	12,500	
35	15 August 1913	Estadio Racing Club, Avellaneda (H)	Uruguay	4–0	Copa Lipton	Susán (4)	—	
36	31 August 1913	Estadio GEBA, Buenos Aires (H)	Uruguay	2–0	Copa Premier Honor Argentino	J. E. Hayes, P. Polimeni	—	
37	21 September 1913	Valparaiso Sporting Club, Viña del Mar (A)	Chile	2–0	Friendly	Unknown	—	
38	5 October 1913	Parque Central, Montevideo (A)	Uruguay	0–1	Copa Premier Honor Uruguayo		—	
39	26 October 1913	Parque Central, Montevideo (A)	Uruguay	0–1	Copa Newton		—	
40	28 February 1914	Buenos Aires (H)	Uruguay	1–1	Friendly	Dannaher	—	
41	30 August 1914	Parque Central, Montevideo (A)	Uruguay	2–3	Copa Premier Honor Uruguayo	Calomino, Dannaher	—	
42	13 September 1914	Estadio GEBA, Buenos Aires (H)	Uruguay	2–1	Copa Premier Honor Argentino	P. Gallardo, D. Lezcano	—	
43	20 September 1914	Estadio GEBA, Buenos Aires (H)	Brazil	3–0	Friendly	Izaguirre (2), Molfino	18,000	
44	27 September 1914	Estadio GEBA, Buenos Aires (H)	Brazil	0–1	Copa Julio Argentino Roca		17,200	
45	28 March 1915	Estadio GEBA, Buenos Aires (H)	Uruguay	0–0	Friendly		—	
46	18 July 1915	Parque Central, Montevideo (A)	Uruguay	3–2	Copa Premier Honor Uruguayo	Marcovecchio (2), J. E. Hayes	—	
47	15 August 1915	Estadio GEBA, Buenos Aires (H)	Uruguay	2–1	Copa Lipton	Marcovecchio, J. E. Hayes	—	
48	12 September 1915	Parque Central, Montevideo (A)	Uruguay	0–2	Copa Newton		—	
49	6 July 1916	Estadio GEBA, Buenos Aires (N)	Chile	6–1	1916 South American Championship	Ohaco (2), J. D. Brown (2), Marcovecchio (2)	18,000	
50	10 July 1916	Estadio GEBA, Buenos Aires (N)	Brazil	1–1	1916 South American Championship	Laguna	16,000	
51	12 July 1916	Estadio GEBA, Buenos Aires (H)	Chile	1–0	Friendly	Heissinger	—	
52	17 July 1916	Estadio Racing Club, Avellaneda (N)	Uruguay	0–0	1916 South American Championship		17,000	
53	15 August 1916	Parque Central, Montevideo (A)	Uruguay	2–1	Copa Lipton	E. Hayes, Laiolo	—	
54	15 August 1916	Estadio Racing Club, Avellaneda (H)	Uruguay	3–1	Copa Newton	Ohaco (2), Hiller	—	
55	1 October 1916	Parque Belvedere, Montevideo (A)	Uruguay	1–0	Copa Premier Honor Uruguayo	Badalini	—	
56	1 October 1916	Estadio Racing Club, Avellaneda (H)	Uruguay	7–2	Copa Círculo de La Prensa	Simmons, Hiller (3), E. Hayes (2), Cabano	15,000	
57	29 October 1916	Parque Central, Montevideo (A)	Uruguay	1–3	Copa Círculo de La Prensa	Guidi	12,000	
58	18 July 1917	Parque Central, Montevideo (A)	Uruguay	2–0	Copa Premier Honor Uruguayo	Marcovecchio (2)	—	
59	15 August 1917	Estadio Racing Club, Avellaneda (H)	Uruguay	1–0	Copa Lipton	Calomino	—	
60	2 September 1917	Parque Central, Montevideo (A)	Uruguay	0–1	Copa Newton		—	
61	3 October 1917	Parque Pereira, Montevideo (N)	Brazil	4–2	1917 South American Championship	Calomino, Ohaco (2), Blanco	22,000	
62	6 October 1917	Parque Pereira, Montevideo (N)	Chile	1–0	1917 South American Championship	García (o.g.)	15,000	
63	14 October 1917	Parque Pereira, Montevideo (N)	Uruguay	0–1	1917 South American Championship		40,000	
64	21 October 1917	Estadio Racing Club, Avellaneda (H)	Chile	1–1	Friendly	Ohaco	10,000	
65	18 July 1918	Parque Pereira, Montevideo (A)	Uruguay	1–1 (a.e.t.)	Copa Premier Honor Uruguayo	N. Rofrano	—	
66	28 July 1918	Parque Pereira, Montevideo (A)	Uruguay	1–3	Copa Premier Honor Uruguayo	C. García	—	
67	15 August 1918	Estadio GEBA, Buenos Aires (H)	Uruguay	0–0 (a.e.t.)	Copa Premier Honor Argentino		—	
68	25 August 1918	Estadio GEBA, Buenos Aires (H)	Uruguay	2–1	Copa Premier Honor Argentino	A. Martín (2)	—	
69	20 September 1918	Parque Pereira, Montevideo (A)	Uruguay	1–1	Copa Lipton	J. Calandra	—	
70	29 September 1918	Estadio GEBA, Buenos Aires (H)	Uruguay	2–0	Copa Newton	N. Vivaldo, Blanco	—	
71	11 May 1919	Estadio de Puerto Sajonia, Asunción (A)	Paraguay	5–1	Friendly	Polimeni, Laguna (2), Ochandio	4,000	
72	13 May 1919	Estádio das Laranjeiras, Rio de Janeiro (N)	Uruguay	2–3	1919 South American Championship	Izaguirre, Varela (o.g.)	18,000	
73	18 May 1919	Estádio das Laranjeiras, Rio de Janeiro (N)	Brazil	1–3	1919 South American Championship	Izaguirre	22,000	
74	20 May 1919	Estadio de Puerto Sajonia, Asunción (A)	Paraguay	2–1	Friendly	Adet, Ochandio	5,000	
75	22 May 1919	Estádio das Laranjeiras, Rio de Janeiro (N)	Chile	4–1	1919 South American Championship	Clarcke (3), Izaguirre	15,000	
76	24 May 1919	Estadio de Puerto Sajonia, Asunción (A)	Paraguay	2–1	Friendly	Bianatti, Ochandio	8,000	
77	1 June 1919	Estádio das Laranjeiras, Rio de Janeiro (A)	Brazil	3–3	Copa Roberto Chery	Clarcke, Mattozzi, Laiolo	—	
78	18 July 1919	Parque Pereira, Montevideo (A)	Uruguay	1–4	Copa Premier Honor Uruguayo	E. Hayes	—	
79	24 August 1919	Parque Pereira, Montevideo (A)	Uruguay	1–2	Copa Newton	F. Olazar	—	
80	7 September 1919	Estadio GEBA, Buenos Aires (H)	Uruguay	1–2	Copa Lipton	Badalini	—	
81	19 October 1919	Estadio GEBA, Buenos Aires (H)	Uruguay	6–1	Copa Premier Honor Argentino	Libonatti (3), E. Celli, N. Vivaldo, J. Chavin	—	
82	7 December 1919	Parque Pereira, Montevideo (A)	Uruguay	2–4 (a.e.t.)	Copa Círculo de La Prensa	Libonatti, Badalini	12,000	

Notes

1. Note 1: This list includes all matches organised by the Argentine Football Association as well as matches organised by the Argentine Football Federation and the Argentine Amateur Football Association that are considered as full internationals by FIFA.
2. A: Due to a lack of light only six minutes of the second period of overtime was played. Uruguay were awarded the trophy as the visiting team.
3. B: Argentina were awarded the trophy as the visiting team.
4. C: Argentina were awarded the trophy as the visiting team.
5. D: Uruguay were awarded the trophy as the visiting team.
6. E: On 16 July 1916, the match was suspended after five minutes due to unrest among supporters at Estadio GEBA, Buenos Aires. The following day, the match was resumed at Estadio Racing Club, Avellaneda.
7. F: Argentina were awarded the trophy as the visiting team.

== Record by opponent ==
Team	Pld	W	D	L	GF	GA	GD	WPCT
Brazil	6	2	2	2	12	10	+2	33.33
Chile	9	7	1	1	23	8	+15	77.78
Paraguay	3	3	0	0	9	3	+6	100.00
Uruguay	64	29	13	22	107	88	+19	45.31
Total	82	41	16	25	151	109	+42	50.00

Source: Results
