= Uruguay national football team records and statistics =

This article contains the list of Uruguay national football team's all records and statistics.

== Management record ==
Competitive matches only as of 6 June 2024

Years	Coach	Pld	W	D	L	GF	GA	Win %	Tournaments
1902–1914	Selection committee	30	10	7	13	45	46	33.33	(gold) 1905 Copa Lipton – Champions; (silver) 1906 Copa Lipton – Runners-up; (silver) 1906 Copa Newton – Runners-up; (silver) 1907 Copa Lipton – Runners-up; (silver) 1907 Copa Newton – Runners-up; (silver) 1908 Copa Lipton – Runners-up; (silver) 1908 Copa Newton – Runners-up; (gold) 1908 Copa Premio Honor Argentino – Champions; (silver) 1909 Copa Lipton – Runners-up; (silver) 1909 Copa Premio Honor Argentino – Runners-up; (silver) 1909 Copa Newton – Runners-up; (silver) 1910 Copa Centenario de la Revolución de Mayo – Runners-up; (gold) 1910 Copa Lipton – Champions; (gold) 1910 Copa Premio Honor Argentino – Champions; (gold) 1911 Copa Lipton – Champions; (silver) 1911 Copa Newton – Runners-up; (silver) 1911 Copa Premio Honor Argentino – Runners-up; (gold) 1911 Copa Premio Honor Uruguayo – Champions; (gold) 1912 Copa Lipton – Champions; (gold) 1912 Copa Premio Honor Uruguayo – Champions; (gold) 1912 Copa Newton – Champions; (silver) 1912 Copa Montevideo – Runners-up; (silver) 1913 Copa Presidente Roque Sáenz Peña – Runners-up; (silver) 1913 Copa Lipton – Runners-up; (gold) 1913 Copa Premio Honor Uruguayo – Champions; (gold) 1913 Copa Newton – Champions
1915–1916	(Uruguay) Jorge Pacheco (Uruguay) Alfredo Foglino	11	4	0	7	18	20	36.36	(silver) 1915 Copa Premio Honor Uruguayo – Runners-up; (silver) 1915 Copa Lipton – Runners-up; (gold) 1915 Copa Newton – Champions; (silver) 1916 Copa Lipton – Runners-up; (silver) 1916 Copa Newton – Runners-up; (gold) 1916 South American Championship – Champions; (silver) 1916 Copa Premio Honor Uruguayo – Runners-up; (silver) 1916 Copa Círculo de la Empresa – Runners-up
1917–1919	(Uruguay) Ramón Platero	17	10	4	3	31	15	58.82	(silver) 1917 Copa Lipton – Runners-up; (gold) 1917 Copa Newton – Champions; (gold) 1917 South American Championship – Champions; (gold) 1918 Copa Premio Honor Uruguayo – Champions; (silver) 1918 Copa Premio Honor Argentino – Runners-up; (silver) 1918 Copa Lipton – Runners-up; (silver) 1918 Copa Newton – Runners-up; (gold) 1919 Copa Premio Honor Uruguayo – Champions; (gold) 1919 Copa Lipton – Champions; (gold) 1919 Copa Newton – Champions; (silver) 1919 South American Championship – Runners-up
1919–1920	(Uruguay) Severino Castillo	4	4	0	0	15	4	100.00	(gold) 1919 Copa Premio Honor Argentino – Champions; (gold) 1919 Copa Círculo de Prensa – Champions; (gold) 1920 Copa Premio Honor Uruguayo – Champions; (gold) 1920 Copa Newton
1920–1922	(Uruguay) Ernesto Fígoli	9	5	1	3	14	7	55.56	(gold) 1920 South American Championship – Champions; (bronze) 1921 South American Championship – Third place (gold) 1922 Copa pitote – Champions; (gold) 1922 Copa Premio Honor Uruguayo – Champions
1922–1923	(Uruguay) Pedro Olivieri	6	2	3	1	5	3	33.33	(bronze) 1922 South American Championship – Third place (gold) 1922 Copa Newton – Champions; (gold) 1923 Copa Lipton – Champions
1923–1924	(Uruguay) Leonardo De Lucca	6	3	1	2	8	9	50.00	(silver) 1923 Copa Premio Honor Uruguayo – Runners-up; (gold) 1923 South American Championship – Champions; (silver) 1924 Copa Newton – Runners-up
1924	(Uruguay) Ernesto Fígoli (2nd time)	5	5	0	0	20	2	100.00	(gold) 1924 Olympics – Champions
1924–1925	(Uruguay) Ernesto Meliante	8	5	2	1	11	2	62.50	(gold) 1924 South American Championship – Champions; (gold) 1925 Copa Bossio – Champions
1926	(Uruguay) Andrés Mazali (Uruguay) Ernesto Fígoli (3rd time)	4	4	0	0	17	2	100.00	(gold) 1926 South American Championship – Champions
1927–1928	(Argentina) José Lago Millán (Uruguay) Luis Grecco	6	3	0	3	16	5	50.00	(silver) 1927 Copa Newton – Runners-up; (silver) 1927 South American Championship – Runners-up; (gold) 1927 Copa Lipton – Champions; (silver) 1928 Copa Newton – Runners-up
1928	(Uruguay) Primo Giannoti	5	4	1	0	12	5	80.00	(gold) 1928 Olympics – Champions
1928–1932	(Uruguay) Alberto Suppici	12	6	2	4	24	16	50.00	(silver) 1928 Copa Lipton – Runners-up; (gold) 1929 Copa Newton – Champions; (gold) 1929 Copa Lipton – Champions; (bronze) 1929 South American Championship – Third place (gold) 1930 FIFA World Cup – Champions; (silver) 1931 Taça Rio Branco – Runners-up; (silver) 1932 Taça Rio Branco – Runners-up
1932–1935	(Uruguay) Raúl Blanco	4	3	0	1	7	2	75.00	(silver) 1935 Copa Héctor Gómez – Runners-up; (gold) 1935 South American Championship – Champions
1935–1941	(Uruguay) Alberto Suppici (2nd time)	24	11	1	12	47	46	45.83	(silver) 1935 Copa Juan Mignaburu – Runners-up; (silver) 1936 Copa Juan Mignaburu – Runners-up; (gold) 1936 Copa Héctor Gómez – Champions; (bronze) 1937 South American Championship – Third place (silver) 1937 Copa Newton – Runners-up; (silver) 1937 Copa Lipton – Runners-up; (silver) 1938 Copa Juan Mignaburu – Runners-up; (silver) 1938 Copa Héctor Gómez – Runners-up; (silver) 1939 South American Championship – Runners-up; (gold) 1940 Taça Rio Branca – Champions; (gold) 1940 Copa Héctor Gómez – Champions; (silver) 1940 Copa Juan Mignaburu – Runners-up; (silver) 1941 South American Championship – Runners-up
1941–1942	(Uruguay) Pedro Cea	1	0	0	1	1	4	0.00	(silver) 1942 Copa Newton – Runners-up
1942–1945	(Uruguay) José Nasazzi	16	10	3	3	41	15	62.50	(gold) 1942 South American Championship – Champions; (silver) 1942 Copa Lipton – Runners-up; (gold) 1943 Copa Juan Mignaburu – Champions; (silver) 1943 Copa Héctor Gómez – Runners-up; 1945 South American Championship – Fourth place (silver) 1945 Copa Lipton – Runners-up
1945–1946	(Uruguay) Aníbal Tejada	3	1	1	1	7	10	33.33	(silver) 1945 Copa Newton – Runners-up; (gold) 1946 Taça Rio Branco – Champions
1946	(Uruguay) Guzmán Vila Gomensoro	5	2	0	3	11	9	40.00	1946 South American Championship – Fourth place
1988–1990	(Uruguay) Óscar Tabárez (1st time)	34	17	8	9	50	28	50.00	(silver) 1989 Copa América – Runners-up
2006–	(Uruguay) Óscar Tabárez (2nd time)	133	66	35	32	225	187	49.62	2007 Copa América – Fourth place 2010 FIFA World Cup – Fourth place (gold) 2011 Copa América – Champions

- 1946–1955: Juan López
- 1955: Juan Carlos Corazzo
- 1955–1957: Hugo Bagnulo
- 1957–1959: Juan López
- 1959: Héctor Castro
- 1959–1961: Juan Carlos Corazzo
- 1961–1962: Enrique Fernández
- 1962–1964: Juan Carlos Corazzo
- 1964–1965: Rafael Milans
- 1965–1967: Ondino Viera
- 1967–1969: Enrique Fernández
- 1969–1970: Juan Hohberg
- 1970–1973: Hugo Bagnulo
- 1974: Roberto Porta
- 1974–1975: Juan Alberto Schiaffino
- 1975–1977: José María Rodríguez
- 1977: Juan Hohberg
- 1977–1979: Raúl Bentancor
- 1979–1982: Roque Máspoli
- 1982–1987: Omar Borrás
- 1987–1988: Roberto Fleitas
- 1988–1990: Óscar Tabárez
- 1990–1993: Luis Cubilla
- 1993–1994: Ildo Maneiro
- 1994–1996: Héctor Núñez
- 1996–1997: Juan Ahuntchaín
- 1997–1998: Roque Máspoli
- 1998–2000: Víctor Púa
- 2000–2001: Daniel Passarella
- 2001–2003: Víctor Púa
- 2003: Gustavo Ferrín
- 2003–2004: Juan Ramón Carrasco
- 2004–2006: Jorge Fossati
- 2006: Gustavo Ferrín
- 2006–2021: Óscar Tabárez
- 2021–2022: Diego Alonso
- 2023–present: Marcelo Bielsa

== Player records ==
As of 31 March 2026, after the match against Saudi Arabia.
Players in bold are still active with Uruguay.

=== Most caps ===
Rank	Player	Caps	Goals	Career
1	Diego Godín	161	8	2005–2022
2	Luis Suárez	143	69	2007–2024
3	Edinson Cavani	136	58	2008–2022
4	**Fernando Muslera**	**135**	0	2009–present
5	Maxi Pereira	125	3	2005–2018
6	Martín Cáceres	116	4	2007–2022
7	Diego Forlán	112	36	2002–2014
8	Cristian Rodríguez	110	11	2003–2018
9	**José María Giménez**	**99**	8	2013–present
10	Diego Lugano	95	9	2003–2014

=== Top scorers ===
Rank	Player	Goals	Caps	Ratio	Career
1	Luis Suárez	69	143	0.49	2007–2024
2	Edinson Cavani	58	136	0.43	2008–2022
3	Diego Forlán	36	112	0.32	2002–2014
4	Héctor Scarone	31	51	0.61	1917–1930
5	Ángel Romano	28	69	0.41	1913–1927
6	Óscar Míguez	27	39	0.69	1950–1958
7	Sebastián Abreu	26	70	0.37	1996–2012
8	Pedro Petrone	24	28	0.86	1923–1930
9	Fernando Morena	22	53	0.42	1971–1983
9	Carlos Aguilera	22	64	0.34	1982–1997

== All-time head-to-head record ==
Below is a list of all matches Uruguay have played against FIFA recognised teams. Updated as of 6 October 2026.

Positive Record Neutral Record Negative Record

Team	Pld	W	D	L	GF	GA	GD	Best result
Algeria	2	0	1	1	0	1	−1	Algeria 1 – 0 Uruguay (Algiers, Algeria; 12 August 2009)
Angola	1	1	0	0	2	0	+2	Angola 0 – 2 Uruguay (Lisbon, Portugal; 11 August 2010)
Argentina	204	60	49	95	236	326	−90	Uruguay 5 – 0 Argentina (Guayaquil, Ecuador; 16 December 1959)
Australia	9	4	1	4	8	6	+2	Uruguay 3 – 0 Australia (Montevideo, Uruguay; 25 November 2001)
Austria	4	1	1	2	5	6	–1	Austria 0 – 2 Uruguay (Vienna, Austria; 14 May 1964)
Belgium	2	0	0	2	1	5	−4	Belgium 3 – 1 Uruguay (Verona, Italy; 17 June 1990)
Bolivia	49	32	9	8	118	35	+83	Uruguay 9 – 0 Bolivia (Lima, Peru; 6 November 1927)
Bosnia and Herzegovina	1	0	0	1	2	3	−1	Bosnia and Herzegovina 3 – 2 Uruguay (Cochin, India; 18 January 2001)
Brazil	81	21	22	38	101	143	−42	Uruguay 6 – 0 Brazil (Valparaíso, Chile; 18 September 1920)
Bulgaria	1	0	1	0	1	1	0	Bulgaria 1 – 1 Uruguay (Hanover, West Germany; 19 June 1974)
Cameroon	1	1	0	0	4	0	+4	Uruguay 4 – 0 Cameroon (Tehran, Iran; 13 August 2003)
Canada	3	2	1	0	7	3	+4	Canada 1 – 3 Uruguay (Miami, United States; 2 February 1986)
Cape Verde	1	0	1	0	2	2	0	
Chile	87	49	20	18	150	87	+63	Uruguay 6 – 0 Chile (Guayaquil, Ecuador; 6 December 1947)
China	6	3	2	1	9	2	+7	China 0 – 4 Uruguay (Wuhan, China; 12 October 2010)
Cuba	1	1	0	0	2	0	+2	Uruguay 2 – 0 Cuba (Montevideo, Uruguay; 20 June 2023)
Colombia	48	22	13	13	69	50	+19	Uruguay 7 – 0 Colombia (Santiago, Chile; 28 January 1945)
Costa Rica	15	8	5	2	25	19	+6	Uruguay 2 – 0 Costa Rica (Miami, United States; 4 February 1990)
Czech Republic (Note: Includes matches against Czechoslovakia.)	6	4	0	2	9	6	+3	Czech Republic 0 – 2 Uruguay (Bern, Switzerland; 16 June 1954) (Nanning, China; 23 March 2018)
Denmark	2	0	0	2	2	8	−6	Uruguay 1 – 2 Denmark (Ulsan, South Korea; 1 June 2002)
Dominican Republic	1	1	0	0	1	0	+1	Uruguay 1 – 0 Dominican Republic (Kuala Lumpur, Malaysia; 10 October 2025)
East Germany	6	1	2	3	4	7	−3	Uruguay 3 – 0 East Germany (Montevideo, Uruguay; 29 January 1985)
Ecuador	50	31	11	8	115	46	+69	Uruguay 7 – 0 Ecuador (Montevideo, Uruguay; 18 January 1942)
Egypt	2	2	0	0	3	0	+3	Egypt 0 – 2 Uruguay (Cairo, Egypt; 16 August 2006)
England	12	5	4	3	16	12	+4	Uruguay 4 – 2 England (Basel, Switzerland; 26 June 1954)
Estonia	2	1	0	1	3	2	+1	Uruguay 3 – 0 Estonia (Rivera, Uruguay; 23 June 2011)
France	10	3	4	3	8	7	+1	France 1 – 5 Uruguay (Colombes, France; 1 June 1924)
Finland	2	2	0	0	8	1	+7	Uruguay 6 – 0 Finland (Montevideo, Uruguay; 8 December 1984)
Georgia	1	0	0	1	0	2	−2	Georgia 2 – 0 Uruguay (Tbilisi, (Georgia (country)) Georgia; 15 November 2006)
Germany (Note: Includes matches against West Germany.)	11	1	2	8	12	29	−17	Germany 1 – 4 Uruguay (Amsterdam, Netherlands; 3 June 1928)
Ghana	2	1	1	0	3	1	+2	Uruguay 1 – 1 Ghana (Johannesburg, South Africa; 2 July 2010)
Guatemala	4	2	2	0	9	4	+5	Uruguay 5 – 1 Guatemala (Montevideo, Uruguay; 6 June 2015)
Haiti	3	1	2	0	1	0	+1	Haiti 0 – 1 Uruguay (Port-au-Prince, Haiti; 23 March 1974)
Honduras	2	0	1	1	2	3	−1	Uruguay 2 – 2 Honduras (Bogotá, Colombia; 29 July 2001)
Hong Kong	2	2	0	0	4	1	+3	Hong Kong 1 – 3 Uruguay (Hong Kong; 9 January 2000)
Hungary	6	3	2	1	10	8	+2	Uruguay 2 – 0 Hungary (Maldonado, Uruguay; 17 February 2000)
Iceland	1	1	0	0	2	1	+1	Uruguay 2 – 1 Iceland (Montevideo, Uruguay; 10 January 2001)
India	2	2	0	0	9	2	+7	India 1 – 6 Uruguay (Kolkata, India; 6 October 2026)
Indonesia	3	2	0	1	11	5	+6	Indonesia 1 – 7 Uruguay (Jakarta, Indonesia; 8 October 2010)
Iran	2	0	1	1	1	2	–1	Uruguay 1 – 1 Iran (Hong Kong; 4 February 2003)
Iraq	1	1	0	0	5	2	+3	Iraq 2 – 5 Uruguay (Tehran, Iran; 15 August 2003)
Israel	6	4	1	1	15	6	+9	Uruguay 4 – 1 Israel (Montevideo, Uruguay; 26 May 2010)
Italy	11	4	4	3	11	12	–1	Uruguay 2 – 0 Italy (Montevideo, Uruguay; 3 January 1981)
Ivory Coast	1	0	0	1	1	2	–1	Ivory Coast 2 – 1 Uruguay (Lens, France; 26 March 2024)
Jamaica	5	4	0	1	9	2	+7	Jamaica 0 – 3 Uruguay (Kingston, Jamaica; 28 March 1974)
Japan	10	4	3	3	25	21	+4	Japan 1 – 4 Uruguay (Tokyo, Japan; 26 May 1985)
Jordan	2	1	1	0	5	0	+5	Jordan 0 – 5 Uruguay (Amman, Jordan; 13 November 2011)
Libya	2	2	0	0	5	3	+2	Libya 2 – 3 Uruguay (Tripoli, Libya; 11 February 2009)
Luxembourg	1	1	0	0	1	0	+1	Luxembourg 0 – 1 Uruguay (Esch-sur-Alzette, Luxembourg; 26 March 1980)
Malaysia	1	1	0	0	6	0	+6	Malaysia 0 – 6 Uruguay (Osaka, Japan; 1 June 1985)
Mexico	24	8	8	8	35	29	+6	Mexico 1 – 4 Uruguay (Houston, United States; 7 September 2018)
Morocco	2	2	0	0	2	0	+2	Morocco 0 – 1 Uruguay (Casablanca, Morocco; 25 April 1964)
Netherlands	6	3	1	2	9	7	+2	Uruguay 2 – 0 Netherlands (Amsterdam, Netherlands; 30 May 1928) (Montevideo, Uruguay; 30 December 1980)
New Zealand	2	1	1	0	9	2	+7	Uruguay 7 – 0 New Zealand (Paysandú, Uruguay; 25 June 1995)
Nigeria	1	1	0	0	2	1	+1	Nigeria 1 – 2 Uruguay (Salvador, Bahia, Brazil; 20 June 2013)
Nicaragua	1	1	0	0	4	1	+3	Uruguay 4 – 1 Nicaragua (Montevideo, Uruguay; 14 June 2023)
Northern Ireland	4	2	0	2	2	4	−2	Northern Ireland 0 – 1 Uruguay (East Rutherford, New Jersey, United States; 21 May 2006)
Norway	2	1	1	0	3	2	+1	Norway 0 – 1 Uruguay (Oslo, Norway; 14 June 1972)
Oman	1	1	0	0	3	0	+3	Oman 0 – 3 Uruguay (Muscat, Oman; 13 October 2014)
Panama	5	5	0	0	18	2	+16	Uruguay 6 – 1 Panama (Santiago, Chile; 6 April 1952)
Paraguay	79	33	20	26	116	96	+20	Uruguay 6 – 1 Paraguay (Santiago, Chile; 1 November 1926)
Peru	72	39	16	17	116	65	+51	Uruguay 6 – 0 Peru (Montevideo, Uruguay; 18 June 2008)
Poland	4	1	2	1	5	4	+1	Poland 1 – 3 Uruguay (Gdańsk, Poland; 14 November 2012)
Portugal	4	1	1	2	3	7	−4	Portugal 1 – 2 Uruguay (Sochi, Russia; 30 June 2018)
Republic of Ireland	4	2	1	1	7	6	+1	Uruguay 2 – 0 Republic of Ireland (Montevideo, Uruguay; 8 May 1974)
Romania	5	2	2	1	8	3	+5	Uruguay 4 – 0 Romania (Montevideo, Uruguay; 21 July 1930)
Russia (Note: Includes matches against the Soviet Union.)	9	2	1	6	8	15	−7	Uruguay 3 – 0 Russia (Samara, Russia; 25 June 2018)
Saar	1	1	0	0	7	1	+6	Saar 1 – 7 Uruguay (Saarbrücken, (Saar Protectorate) Germany; 5 June 1954)
Saudi Arabia	4	1	2	1	5	5	0	Saudi Arabia 0 – 1 Uruguay (Rostov, Russia; 20 June 2018)
Scotland	4	2	1	1	10	4	+6	Uruguay 7 – 0 Scotland (Basel, Switzerland; 19 June 1954)
Senegal	1	0	1	0	3	3	0	Senegal 3 – 3 Uruguay (Suwon, South Korea; 11 June 2002)
Serbia (Note: Includes matches against Yugoslavia and Serbia and Montenegro.)	7	3	1	3	17	8	+9	Yugoslavia 0 – 7 Uruguay (Colombes, France; 26 May 1924)
Singapore	1	1	0	0	2	1	+1	Singapore 1 – 2 Uruguay (Singapore City, Singapore; 21 May 2002)
Slovenia	2	2	0	0	4	0	+4	Slovenia 0 – 2 Uruguay (Koper, Slovenia; 28 February 2001)
South Africa	3	2	1	0	7	3	+4	South Africa 0 – 3 Uruguay (Pretoria, South Africa; 16 June 2010)
South Korea	11	8	2	1	19	8	+11	South Korea 1 – 4 Uruguay (Seoul, South Korea; 28 September 2026)
Spain	11	0	5	6	8	17	−9	Spain 0 – 0 Uruguay (São Paulo, Brazil; 9 July 1950) (A Coruña, Spain; 18 January 1995)
Sweden	3	1	0	2	3	6	−3	Uruguay 3 – 2 Sweden (São Paulo, Brazil; 13 July 1950)
Switzerland	4	3	1	0	13	4	+9	Uruguay 4 – 0 Switzerland (Montevideo, Uruguay; 18 December 1980)
Tahiti	1	1	0	0	8	0	+8	Tahiti 0 – 8 Uruguay (Recife, Brazil; 23 June 2013)
Thailand	1	1	0	0	4	0	+4	Uruguay 4 – 0 Thailand (Nanning, China; 25 March 2019)
Trinidad and Tobago	1	1	0	0	3	1	+2	Uruguay 3 – 1 Trinidad and Tobago (Montevideo, Uruguay; 28 May 2016)
Tunisia	1	0	1	0	0	0	0	Tunisia 0 – 0 Uruguay (Radès, Tunisia; 2 June 2006)
Turkey	1	1	0	0	3	2	+1	Turkey 2 – 3 Uruguay (Bochum, Germany; 25 May 2008)
Ukraine	1	1	0	0	3	2	+1	Ukraine 2 – 3 Uruguay (Kharkiv, Ukraine; 2 September 2011)
United Arab Emirates	1	1	0	0	2	0	+2	United Arab Emirates 0 – 2 Uruguay (Riyadh, Saudi Arabia; 13 December 1997)
United States	10	3	4	3	11	12	–1	Uruguay 3 – 0 United States (Colombes, France; 29 May 1924)
Uzbekistan	3	3	0	0	8	1	+7	Uruguay 3 – 0 Uzbekistan (Montevideo, Uruguay; 7 June 2018) (Nanning, China; 22 March 2019)
Venezuela	35	20	10	5	66	23	+43	Uruguay 5 – 0 Venezuela (Montevideo, Uruguay; 23 May 1975)
Wales	2	1	1	0	1	0	+1	Uruguay 1 – 0 Wales (Nanning, China; 26 March 2018)
Total (89)	1021	454	251	317	1591	1228	+364	Uruguay 9 – 0 Bolivia (Lima, Peru; 6 November 1927)

== World Cup records ==
Bolded names indicate that the player is active.

=== Most participations in the World Cup ===
Player	Participations	World Cups
**Fernando Muslera**	5	2010–2026
Pedro Rocha	4	1962–1974
Edinson Cavani	4	2010–2022
Diego Godín	4	2010–2022
Luis Suárez	4	2010–2022
Martín Cáceres	4	2010–2022
**José Giménez**	4	2014–2026
**Rodrigo Bentancur**	3	2018–2026
**Giorgian de Arrascaeta**	3	2018–2026
Sebastián Coates	3	2014–2022
Martín Silva	3	2010–2018
William Martínez	3	1950–1954, 1962
Julio César Cortés	3	1962–1970
Víctor Espárrago	3	1966–1974
Luis Cubilla	3	1962,1970–1974
Ladislao Mazurkiewicz	3	1966–1974
Diego Forlán	3	2002, 2010–2014
Maxi Pereira	3	2010–2018

=== Most goals scored in the World Cup ===
Player	Goals	World Cups
Oscar Míguez	8 (5–3)	1950–1954
Luis Suárez	7 (3–2–2–0)	2010–2022
Diego Forlán	6 (1–5–0)	2002, 2010–2014
Edinson Cavani	5 (1–1–3–0)	2010–2022
Pedro Cea	5	1930
Juan Schiaffino	5 (3–2)	1950–1954
Carlos Borges	4	1954
Alcides Ghiggia	4	1950
Peregrino Anselmo	3	1930
Juan Hohberg	3	1954

=== Most matches played in the World Cup ===
Player	Matches	World Cups
**Fernando Muslera**	17 (7–4–5–0-1)	2010–2026
Edinson Cavani	17 (6–4–4–3)	2010–2022
Diego Godín	16 (5–4–5–2)	2010–2022
Luis Suárez	16 (6–2–5–3)	2010–2022
Ladislao Mazurkiewicz	13 (4–6–3)	1966–1974
Martín Cáceres	12 (2–4–5–1)	2010–2022
Egidio Arévalo Ríos	11 (7–4)	2010–2014
Julio César Cortés	11 (1–4–6)	1962–1970
**José Giménez**	10 (3–4–3)	2014–2026
Diego Forlán	10 (1–7–2)	2002, 2010–2014
Maxi Pereira	10 (7–3–0)	2010–2018
Pedro Rocha	10 (2–4–1–3)	1962–1974
Luis Ubina	10 (4–6)	1966–1970
**Rodrigo Bentancur**	9 (5–3-1)	2018–2026

=== World Cup winning captains ===
Year	Player	Career	Caps	Goals
1930	José Nasazzi	1923–1937	41	0
1950	Obdulio Varela	1939–1954	45	9

=== Record against teams in the World Cup ===
As of 26 June 2026 after the match against Spain.

Opponents	Pld	W	D	L	GF	GA
Cape Verde	1	0	1	0	2	2
France	4	1	2	1	2	3
Germany (Note: Includes matches against West Germany.)	4	0	1	3	5	9
England	3	2	1	0	6	3
Russia (Note: Includes matches against the Soviet Union.)	3	2	0	1	5	2
Italy	3	1	1	1	1	2
Sweden	3	1	0	2	3	6
South Korea	3	2	1	0	3	1
Brazil	2	1	0	1	3	4
Scotland	2	1	1	0	7	0
Mexico	2	1	1	0	1	0
Serbia (Note: Includes matches against Yugoslavia.)	2	1	0	1	7	4
Argentina	2	1	0	1	4	3
Colombia	2	1	0	1	2	3
Spain	3	0	2	1	2	3
Netherlands	2	0	0	2	2	5
Denmark	2	0	0	2	2	8
Portugal	2	1	0	1	2	3
Ghana	2	1	1	0	3	1
Bolivia	1	1	0	0	8	0
Romania	1	1	0	0	4	0
South Africa	1	1	0	0	3	0
Czech Republic (Note: Includes matches against Czechoslovakia.)	1	1	0	0	2	0
Israel	1	1	0	0	2	0
Egypt	1	1	0	0	1	0
Peru	1	1	0	0	1	0
Saudi Arabia	2	1	1	0	2	1
Senegal	1	0	1	0	3	3
Bulgaria	1	0	1	0	1	1
Hungary	1	0	0	1	2	4
Austria	1	0	0	1	1	3
Belgium	1	0	0	1	1	3
Costa Rica	1	0	0	1	1	3
Total (33)	60	25	14	21	92	78

== Minor tournament records ==
Year	Round	Position	Pld	W	D	L	GF	GA
(Argentina) 1905 Copa Lipton	Champions	1st	1	0	1	0	0	0
(Uruguay) 1906 Copa Lipton	Runners-up	2nd	1	0	0	1	0	2
(Argentina) 1906 Copa Newton	Runners-up	2nd	1	0	0	1	1	2
(Argentina) 1907 Copa Lipton	Runners-up	2nd	1	0	0	1	1	2
(Uruguay) 1907 Copa Newton	Runners-up	2nd	1	0	0	1	1	2
(Uruguay) 1908 Copa Lipton	Runners-up	2nd	1	0	1	0	2	2
(Argentina) 1908 Copa Newton	Runners-up	2nd	1	0	0	1	1	2
(Argentina) 1908 Copa Premier Honor Argentino	Champions	1st	1	1	0	0	1	0
(Argentina) 1909 Copa Lipton	Runners-up	2nd	1	0	0	1	1	2
(Uruguay) 1909 Copa Newton	Runners-up	2nd	1	0	1	0	2	2
(Argentina) 1909 Copa Premio Honor Argentino	Runners-up	2nd	1	0	0	1	1	3
(Argentina) 1910 Copa Centenario de la Revolución de Mayo	Runners-up	2nd	2	1	0	1	4	4
(Uruguay) 1910 Copa Lipton	Champions	1st	1	1	0	0	2	1
(Argentina) 1910 Copa Premio Honor Argentino	Champions	1st	2	1	1	0	7	3
(Argentina) 1911 Copa Lipton	Champions	1st	1	1	0	0	2	0
(Uruguay) 1911 Copa Newton	Runners-up	2nd	1	0	0	1	2	3
(Argentina) 1911 Copa Premio Honor Argentino	Runners-up	2nd	1	0	0	1	0	2
(Uruguay) 1911 Copa Premio Honor Uruguayo	Champions	1st	2	1	1	0	4	1
(Uruguay) 1912 Copa Lipton	Champions	1st	1	1	0	0	2	0
(Uruguay) 1912 Copa Premio Honor Uruguayo	Champions	1st	1	1	0	0	3	0
(Argentina) 1912 Copa Newton	Champions	1st	1	0	1	0	3	3
(Uruguay) 1912 Copa Montevideo	Runners-up	2nd	1	0	0	1	1	3
(Argentina) 1913 Copa Presidente; Roque Sáenz Peña	Runners-up	2nd	2	0	1	1	2	3
(Argentina) 1913 Copa Lipton	Runners-up	2nd	1	0	0	1	0	4
(Uruguay) 1913 Copa Premio Honor Uruguayo	Champions	1st	1	1	0	0	1	0
(Uruguay) 1913 Copa Newton	Champions	1st	1	1	0	0	1	0
(Uruguay) 1915 Copa Premio Honor Uruguayo	Runners-up	2nd	1	0	0	1	2	3
(Argentina) 1915 Copa Lipton	Runners-up	2nd	1	0	0	1	1	2
(Uruguay) 1915 Copa Newton	Champions	1st	1	1	0	0	2	0
(Uruguay) 1916 Copa Lipton	Runners-up	2nd	1	0	0	1	1	2
(Argentina) 1916 Copa Newton	Runners-up	2nd	1	0	0	1	1	3
(Uruguay) 1916 Copa Premio Honor Uruguayo	Runners-up	2nd	1	0	0	1	0	1
1916 Copa Círculo de la Empresa	Runners-up	2nd	2	1	0	1	5	8
(Argentina) 1917 Copa Lipton	Runners-up	2nd	1	0	0	1	0	1
(Uruguay) 1917 Copa Newton	Champions	1st	1	1	0	0	1	0
(Uruguay) 1918 Copa Premio Honor Uruguayo	Champions	1st	2	1	1	0	4	2
(Argentina) 1918 Copa Premio Honor Argentino	Runners-up	2nd	2	0	1	1	1	2
(Uruguay) 1918 Copa Lipton	Runners-up	2nd	1	0	1	0	1	1
(Argentina) 1918 Copa Newton	Runners-up	2nd	1	0	0	1	0	2
(Uruguay) 1919 Copa Premio Honor Uruguayo	Champions	1st	1	1	0	0	4	1
(Argentina) 1919 Copa Lipton	Champions	1st	1	1	0	0	2	1
(Uruguay) 1919 Copa Newton	Champions	1st	1	1	0	0	2	1
(Argentina) 1919 Copa Premio Honor Argentino	Runners-up	2nd	1	0	0	1	1	6
(Uruguay) 1919 Copa Círculo de Prensa	Champions	1st	1	1	0	0	4	2
(Uruguay) 1920 Copa Premio Honor Uruguayo	Champions	1st	1	1	0	0	2	0
(Argentina) 1920 Copa Newton	Champions	1st	1	1	0	0	3	1
(Argentina) 1920 Copa Premio Honor Argentino	Runners-up	2nd	1	0	0	1	0	1
(Uruguay) 1922 Copa Lipton	Champions	1st	1	1	0	0	1	0
(Uruguay) 1922 Copa Premio Honor Uruguayo	Champions	1st	1	1	0	0	1	0
(Argentina) 1922 Copa Newton	Champions	1st	1	0	1	0	2	2
(Argentina) 1923 Copa Lipton	Champions	1st	1	0	1	0	0	0
(Argentina) 1923 Copa Ministro de Relaciones Exteriores	Champions	1st	1	0	1	0	2	2
(Uruguay) 1923 Copa Premio Honor Uruguayo	Runners-up	2nd	2	0	1	1	2	4
(Argentina) 1924 Copa Newton	Runners-up	2nd	1	0	0	1	0	4
(Uruguay) 1924 Copa Lipton	Champions	1st	1	1	0	0	2	0
1925 Copa Bossio	Champions	1st	5	3	1	1	3	1
(Uruguay) 1927 Copa Newton	Runners-up	2nd	1	0	0	1	0	1
(Argentina) 1927 Copa Lipton	Champions	1st	1	1	0	0	1	0
(Argentina) 1928 Copa Newton	Runners-up	2nd	1	0	0	1	0	1
(Uruguay) 1928 Copa Lipton	Runners-up	2nd	1	0	1	0	2	2
(Uruguay) 1929 Copa Newton	Champions	1st	1	1	0	0	2	1
(Argentina) 1929 Copa Lipton	Champions	1st	1	0	1	0	0	0
(Argentina) 1930 Copa Newton	Champions	1st	1	0	1	0	1	1
(Brazil) 1931 Taça Rio Branco	Runners-up	2nd	1	0	0	1	0	2
(Uruguay) 1932 Taça Rio Branco	Runners-up	2nd	1	0	0	1	1	2
(Uruguay) 1935 Copa Héctor Gómez	Runners-up	2nd	1	0	1	0	1	1
(Argentina) 1935 Copa Juan Mignaburu	Runners-up	2nd	1	0	0	1	0	3
(Argentina) 1936 Copa Juan Mignaburu	Runners-up	2nd	1	0	0	1	0	1
(Uruguay) 1936 Copa Héctor Gómez	Champions	1st	1	1	0	0	2	1
(Uruguay) 1937 Copa Newton	Runners-up	2nd	1	0	0	1	0	3
(Argentina) 1937 Copa Lipton	Runners-up	2nd	1	0	0	1	1	5
(Argentina) 1938 Copa Juan Mignaburu	Runners-up	2nd	1	0	0	1	0	1
(Uruguay) 1938 Copa Héctor Gómez	Runners-up	2nd	1	0	0	1	2	3
(Brazil) 1940 Taça Rio Branco	Champions	1st	2	1	1	0	5	4
(Uruguay) 1940 Copa Héctor Gómez	Champions	1st	1	1	0	0	3	0
(Argentina) 1940 Copa Juan Mignaburu	Runners-up	2nd	1	0	0	1	0	5
(Argentina) 1942 Copa Newton	Runners-up	2nd	1	0	0	1	1	4
(Uruguay) 1942 Copa Lipton	Runners-up	2nd	1	0	1	0	1	1
(Argentina) 1943 Copa Juan Mignaburu	Champions	1st	1	0	1	0	3	3
(Uruguay) 1943 Copa Héctor Gómez	Runners-up	2nd	1	1	0	0	0	1
(Uruguay) 1945 Copa Lipton	Runners-up	2nd	1	0	1	0	2	2
(Argentina) 1945 Copa Newton	Runners-up	2nd	1	0	0	1	2	6
(Uruguay) 1946 Taça Rio Branco	Champions	1st	2	1	1	0	5	4
(Brazil) 1947 Taça Rio Branco	Runners-up	2nd	2	0	1	1	2	3
(Uruguay) 1948 Taça Rio Branco	Champions	1st	2	1	1	0	5	3
(Brazil) 1950 Copa Trompowski	Runners-up	2nd	1	0	0	1	2	3
(Brazil) 1950 Taça Rio Branco	Runners-up	2nd	3	1	0	2	6	7
1956 Taça do Atlântico	Third place	3rd	2	0	0	2	1	4
(Uruguay) 1957 Copa Newton	Runners-up	2nd	1	0	1	0	0	0
(Argentina) 1957 Copa Lipton	Champions	1st	1	0	1	0	1	1
1960 Taça do Atlântico	Third place	3rd	3	2	0	1	3	5
(Argentina) 1957 Copa Lipton	Runners-up	2nd	1	0	0	1	1	3
1963 Copa Juan Pinto Durán	Champions	1st	2	1	1	0	3	2
1965 Copa Artigas	Champions	1st	2	1	0	1	5	2
1965 Copa Juan Pinto Durán	Champions	1st	2	1	1	0	1	1
1966 Copa Artigas	Champions	1st	2	1	1	0	5	3
(Uruguay) 1967 Taça Rio Branco	Champions	1st	3	0	3	0	3	3
(Argentina) 1968 Copa Lipton	Runners-up	2nd	1	0	0	1	0	2
(Brazil) Taça Rio Branco	Runners-up	2nd	2	0	0	2	0	6
(Uruguay) 1968 Copa Newton	Champions	1st	1	1	0	0	2	1
1971 Copa Juan Pinto Durán	Runners-up	2nd	2	1	0	1	3	5
(Brazil) 1972 Brazilian Independence Cup	Final round	8th	3	0	1	2	1	3
(Argentina) 1973 Copa Lipton	Champions	1st	1	0	1	0	1	1
(Uruguay) 1973 Copa Newton	Runners-up	2nd	1	0	1	0	1	1
1975 Copa Artigas	Champions	1st	2	1	0	1	1	1
1975 Copa Juan Pinto Durán	Champions	1st	2	2	0	0	4	1
(Uruguay) 1975 Copa Newton	Runners-up	2nd	1	0	0	1	2	3
(Argentina) 1976 Copa Lipton†	Runners-up	2nd	1	0	0	1	1	4
1976 Taça Rio Branco†	Runners-up	2nd	2	0	0	2	2	4
(Uruguay) 1976 Copa Newton†	Runners-up	2nd	1	0	0	1	0	3
1976 Taça do Atlântico	Fourth place	4th	6	0	1	5	5	14
1977 Copa Artigas	Champions	1st	2	1	1	0	3	2
1976–77 Copa Juan Pinto Durán	Champions	1st	2	1	1	0	3	0
1979 Copa Juan Pinto Duran	Runners-up	2nd	2	1	0	1	2	2
(Uruguay) 1980–81 Mundialito	Champions	1st	3	3	0	0	6	1
1981 Copa Juan Pinto Durán	Champions	1st	2	1	1	0	2	1
(India) 1982 Nehru Cup	Champions	1st	4	2	2	0	7	3
1983 Copa Artigas	Champions	1st	2	1	1	0	3	0
(Uruguay) 1984 Copa William Poole	Champions	1st	1	1	0	0	1	0
1985 Copa Artigas	Champions	1st	2	2	0	0	4	1
(Japan) 1985 Kirin Cup	Runners-up	2nd	6	3	2	1	18	10
(France) 1985 Artemio Franchi Trophy	Runners-up	2nd	1	0	0	1	0	2
(United States) 1986 Miami Cup	Champions	1st	2	1	1	0	4	2
(Colombia) 1988 Copa Jiménez de Quesada	Runners-up	2nd	1	0	0	1	1	2
(Paraguay) 1988 Copa Boquerón	Runners-up	2nd	2	1	0	1	3	4
1988 Copa Juan Pinto Durán	Champions	1st	2	1	1	0	4	2
1988 Copa MUFP	Champions	1st	1	1	0	0	3	0
(United States) 1990 Marlboro Cup	Champions	1st	2	2	0	0	4	0
(Uruguay) 1992 Copa Lipton	Runners-up	2nd	1	0	1	0	0	0
(Peru) 1994 Copa Parra del Riego	Champions	1st	1	1	0	0	1	0
(Uruguay) 1995 Copa El Inca	Champions	1st	1	1	0	0	1	0
(China) 2002 Phillips Cup	Champions	1st	1	1	0	0	2	0
(Singapore) 2002 Tiger Beer Challenge Trophy	Champions	1st	1	1	0	0	2	1
(Hong Kong) 2003 Carlsberg Cup	Champions	1st	2	1	1	0	4	1
(Iran) 2003 LG Cup	Champions	1st	2	2	0	0	9	2
(Tunisia) 2006 LG Cup	Champions	1st	2	1	1	0	2	1
(Japan) 2008 Kirin Challenge Cup	Champions	1st	1	1	0	0	3	1
(Uruguay) 2011 Copa Confraternidad Antel	Champions	1st	1	0	1	0	3	1
(Uruguay) 2011 Copa 100 Años del Banco de Seguros del Estado	Champions	1st	1	1	0	0	3	0
2018 China Cup	Champions	1st	2	2	0	0	3	0
2019 China Cup	Champions	1st	2	2	0	0	7	0
Total	–	71 Titles	201	82	52	67	286	256

†played consecutively with Taça do Atlantica in 1976
