= Copa Premier Honor Uruguayo =

- Organising body: (Argentina) AFA (Uruguay) AUF
- Founded: 1911
- Abolished: 1924; 101 years ago
- Region: Montevideo
- Number of teams: 2
- Related competitions: Copa Premier Honor Argentino; Copa Lipton; Copa Newton
- Last champions: Argentina (1924)
- Most successful club(s): Uruguay (8 titles)

The Copa Premier Honor Uruguayo or the Copa Honor Uruguayo was an international football friendly competition contested by Uruguay and Argentina national teams. It was played for on thirteen occasions between 1911 and 1924. All games were played in Montevideo.

== Overview ==
Outside the British Home Championship, Argentina–Uruguay is one of the oldest fixtures in international football. During the 1910s and 1920s they regularly played each other up to four times a year. In addition to South American Championship matches, the Copa Premier Honor Uruguayo was one of several trophies the two national teams regularly competed for during this era. The others included the Copa Premier Honor Argentino, which was played in Buenos Aires, the Copa Lipton and the Copa Newton.

For the final game in 1924, both teams were selected by dissident national associations. The Argentina team represented the "Asociación Amateurs de Football" while the Uruguay represented the "Federación Uruguaya de Football", both associations formed outside official bodies AFA and AUF.

== List of champions ==
=== Finals ===
The following list includes all the editions of the Copa Premier Honor Uruguayo:

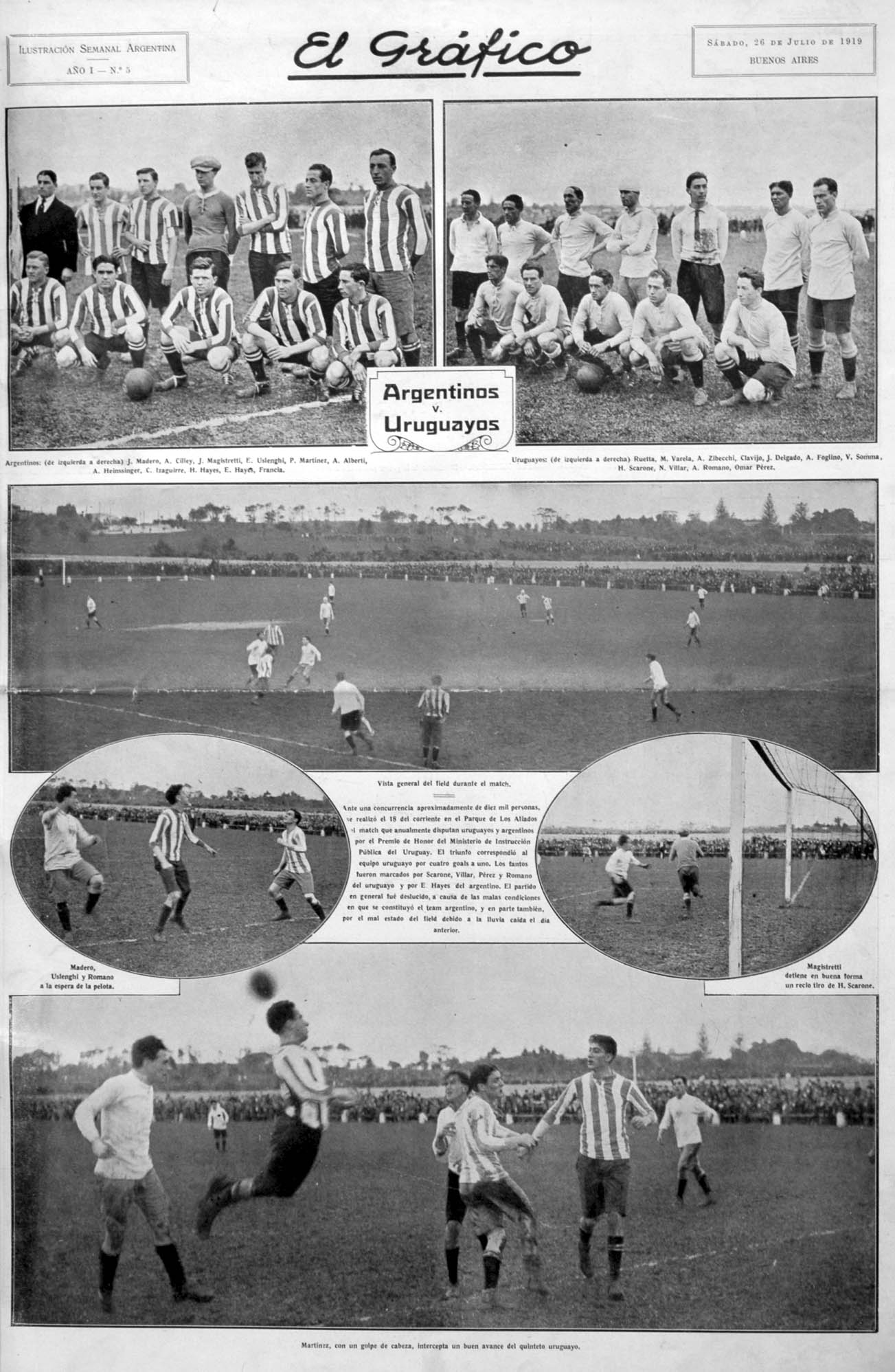
Teams and some moments of the 1919 edition, covered on El Gráfico

- Playoff result

Ed.	Year	Champion	Score	Venue
1	1911	Uruguay	1–1	Parque Central
1	1911	Uruguay	3–0	Parque Central
2	1912	Uruguay	3–0	Parque Central
3	1913	Uruguay	1–0	Parque Central
4	1914	Uruguay	3–2	Parque Central
5	1915	Argentina	3–2	Parque Central
6	1916	Argentina	1–0	Belvedere
7	1917	Argentina	2–0	Parque Central
8	1918	Uruguay	1–1	Parque Pereira
8	1918	Uruguay	3–1	Parque Pereira
9	1919	Uruguay	4–1	Parque Pereira
10	1920	Uruguay	2–0	Parque Central
11	1922	Uruguay	1–0	Parque Central
12	1923	Argentina	2–2	Parque Central
12	1923	Argentina	2–0	Parque Central
13	1924	Argentina	3–2	Pocitos

=== Titles by country ===
Team	Titles	Years won
Uruguay	8	1911, 1912, 1913, 1914, 1918, 1919, 1920, 1922
Argentina	5	1915, 1916, 1917, 1923, 1924

== All-time scorers ==
Player	Goals
(Uruguay) Ángel Romano	6
(Uruguay) Hector Scarone	4
(Argentina) Alberto Marcovecchio	4
(Uruguay) Jose Piendibene	3
(Uruguay) Carlos Scarone	2
(Uruguay) Pascual Ruotta	2
(Uruguay) Ricardo Vallarino	2
(Argentina) Fausto Lucarelli	2

== Most finals by player ==
- 9: (Uruguay) Alfredo Foglino (won 6)
- 7: (Uruguay) Angel Romano (won 5), (Uruguay) Cayetano Saporiti (won 4)
- 6: (Uruguay) José Piendibene (won 5)
- 5: (Uruguay) Hector Scarone (won 4), (Uruguay) Pablo Dacal (won 4), (Argentina) Juan Enrique Hayes (won 1)
- 4: (Argentina) Juan Domingo Brown (won 1), (Argentina) Carlos Tomás Wilson (won 1)
- 3: (Argentina) Alberto Marcovecchio (won 3), (Uruguay) Carlos Scarone (won 2), (Argentina) Pedro Calomino (won 1)

== See also ==
- Copa Premier Honor Argentino
- Copa Lipton
- Copa Newton
