= José Brachi =

Uruguayan footballer (1888-1967)

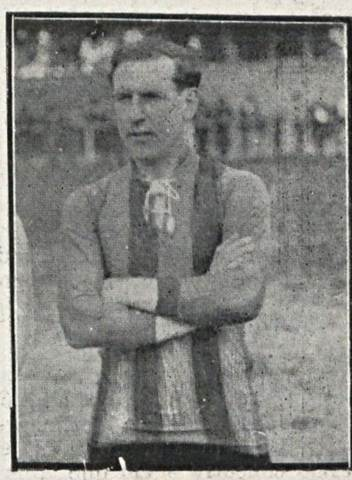

Personal information
- Date of birth: 20 January 1888
- Date of death: 22 August 1967 (aged 79)
- Position: Forward

Senior career*
Years	Team	Apps	(Gls)
- Dublin (Montevideo)
1910–1911	Nacional		
1915–1918	Nacional		

International career
1908–1916	Uruguay	14	(3)
Medal record
Men's football
Representing Uruguay
South American Championship
Winner	1916 Argentina
- * Club domestic league appearances and goals

José Brachi (20 January 1888 – 22 August 1967) was a Uruguayan footballer who played for Nacional.

== Career statistics ==
=== International ===
National team	Year	Apps	Goals
Uruguay	1908	2	2
Uruguay	1909	3	0
Uruguay	1910	2	1
Uruguay	1911	3	0
Uruguay	1915	2	0
Uruguay	1916	2	0
Total		14	3

=== International goals ===
Scores and results list Uruguay's goal tally first.

No	Date	Venue	Opponent	Score	Result	Competition
1.	13 September 1908	Cancha de Gimnasia y Esgrima, Buenos Aires, Argentina	Argentina	1–2	1–2	Copa Newton
2.	14 October 1908	Cancha de Gimnasia y Esgrima, Buenos Aires, Argentina	Argentina	1–0	1–0	Copa Premier Honor Argentino
3.	29 May 1910	Cancha de Gimnasia y Esgrima, Buenos Aires, Argentina	Chile	2–0	3–0	Copa Centenario Revolución de Mayo

== Honours ==
Nacional

- Primera División: 1915, 1916, 1917, 1919

Uruguay

- Copa América: 1916
