= Barrio Lisandro de la Torre =

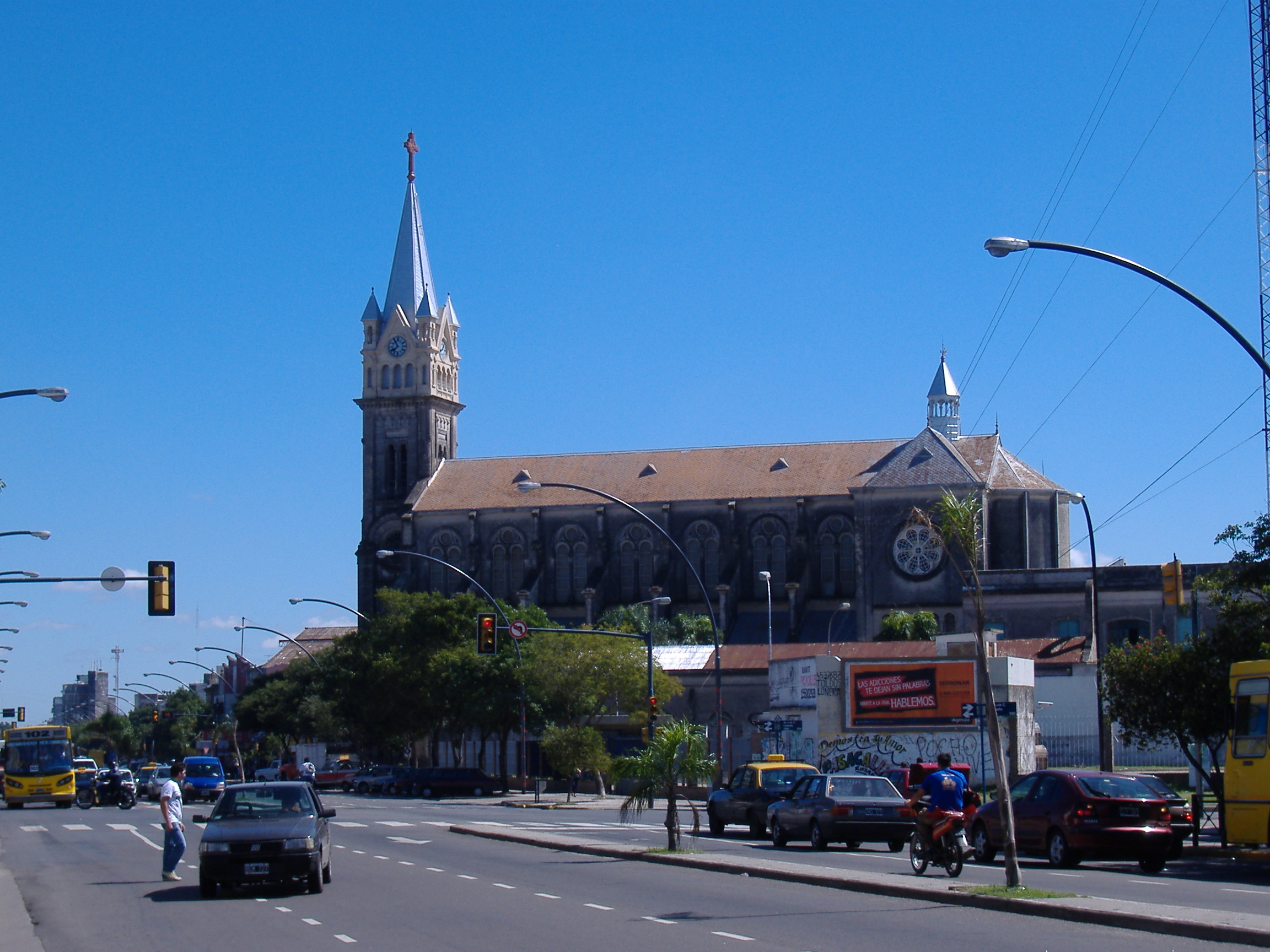
Alberdi Avenue, Barrio Lisandro de la Torre.

Lisandro de la Torre is a barrio (traditional neighborhood) in Rosario, Argentina, located in the north-east of the city. It is officially named after local politician Lisandro de la Torre (1868–1939) and is also commonly known as Arroyito.

It is a traditional neighborhood in northern Rosario, extending between Avenida Alberdi and the Paraná River. It includes Parque Alem, one of Rosario's major public parks, the Gigante de Arroyito Stadium (home of local football team Rosario Central), and the mouth of the Ludueña Stream, as well as the Municipal Aquarium.

== Notable people ==
- Juan Enrique Hayes (1891-1976), international footballer, was born in Arroyito
