= Copa Lipton =

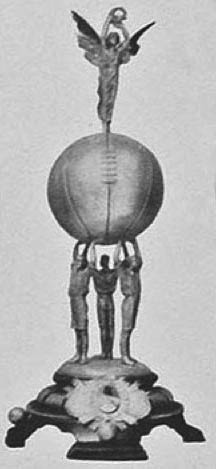
- The trophy given to champions
- Organising body: (Argentina) AFA (Uruguay) AUF
- Founded: 1905
- Abolished: 1992; 33 years ago
- Region: Argentina, Uruguay
- Number of teams: 2
- Related competitions: List: Copa Newton; Copa Honor Arg; Copa Honor Uru
- Most successful team(s): Argentina (17 titles)

The Copa Lipton or Copa de Caridad Lipton was a football friendly competition contested between Argentina and Uruguay national teams. The competition was held 29 times between 1905 and 1992.

== History ==
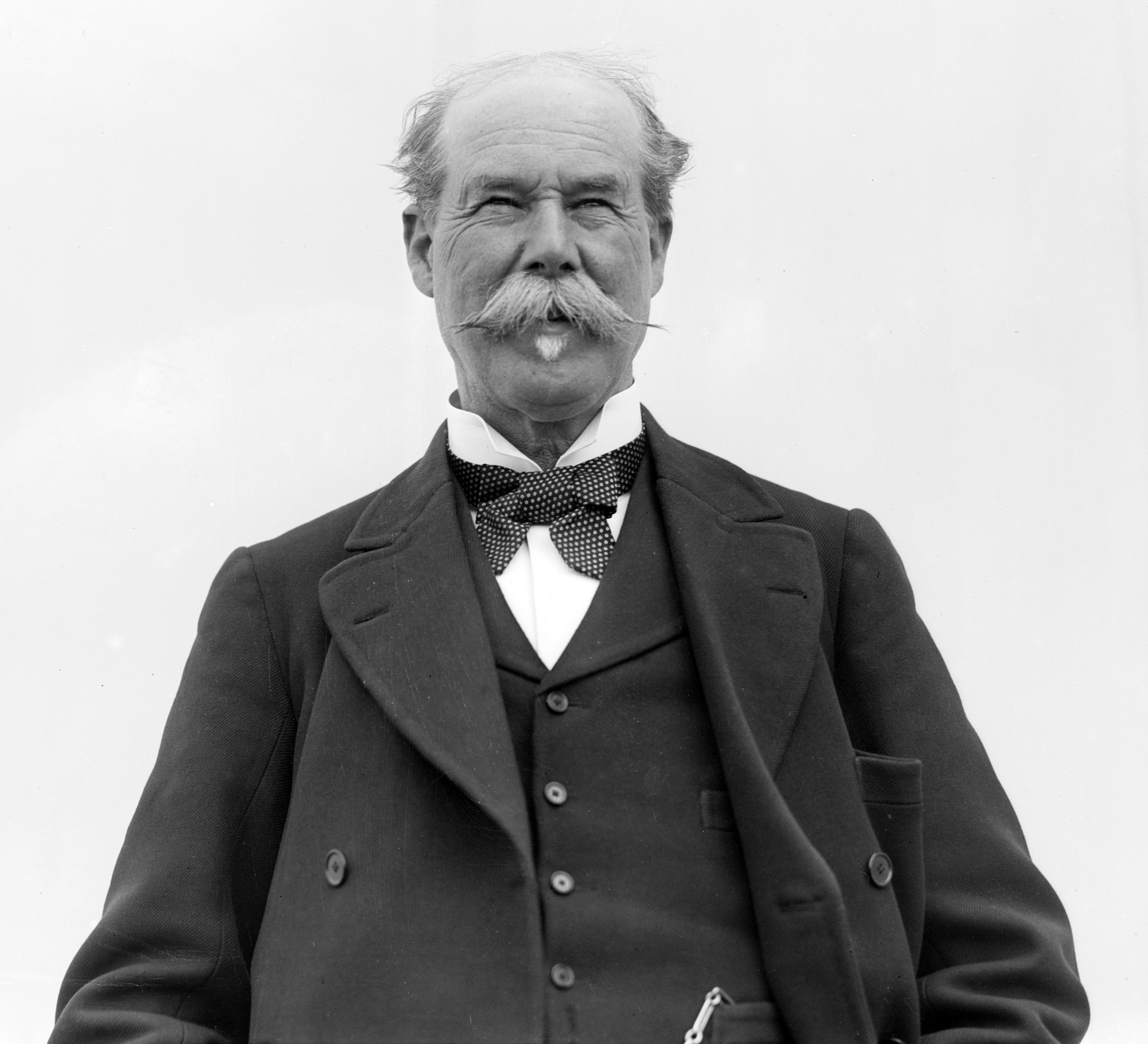
Scottish magnate Thomas Lipton donated the trophy

The trophy was donated by the Scottish tea magnate Thomas Lipton for a tournament between the two countries either side of the Río de La Plata with the condition that the teams be made up of only native born players. The trophy (the oldest international cup exhibited at the Argentine Association headquarters) was sculpted by English goldsmiths Flokington from Regent Street.

The tournament was contested on an annual basis between 1905 and 1929, with the exception of 1914, 1920–1921 and 1925–1926. It has only been played sporadically since, with only 9 editions played over half a century between 1937 and 1992. The decade of 1910 is considered "the golden age" of the competition, due to Argentina and Uruguay were the predominant teams in South America by then and the Copa Lipton was the most important competition for both sides. Nevertheless, the Cup lost interest since the 1930s because of the birth of FIFA World Cup, the conflicts between AFA and AUF and the inclusion of other nations in South American competitions.

The Copa Lipton has been contested 29 times in total, with Argentina the winners on 18 occasions and Uruguay on 11. In the event of a draw, the cup was traditionally awarded to the away team and the date and rules of the next tournament were set by the holders.

== List of champions ==
=== Finals ===
The following list includes all editions of Copa Lipton:

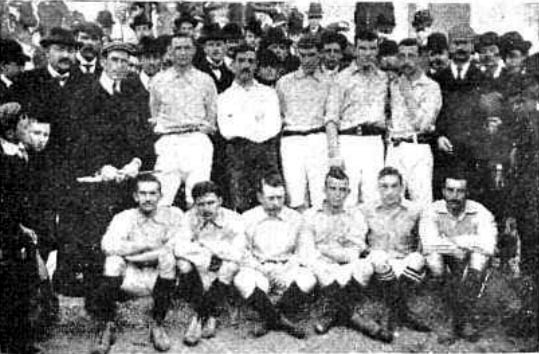
Argentina, winning side in 1905

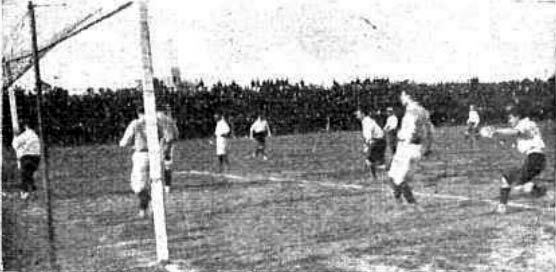
Scene of the first edition held in 1905

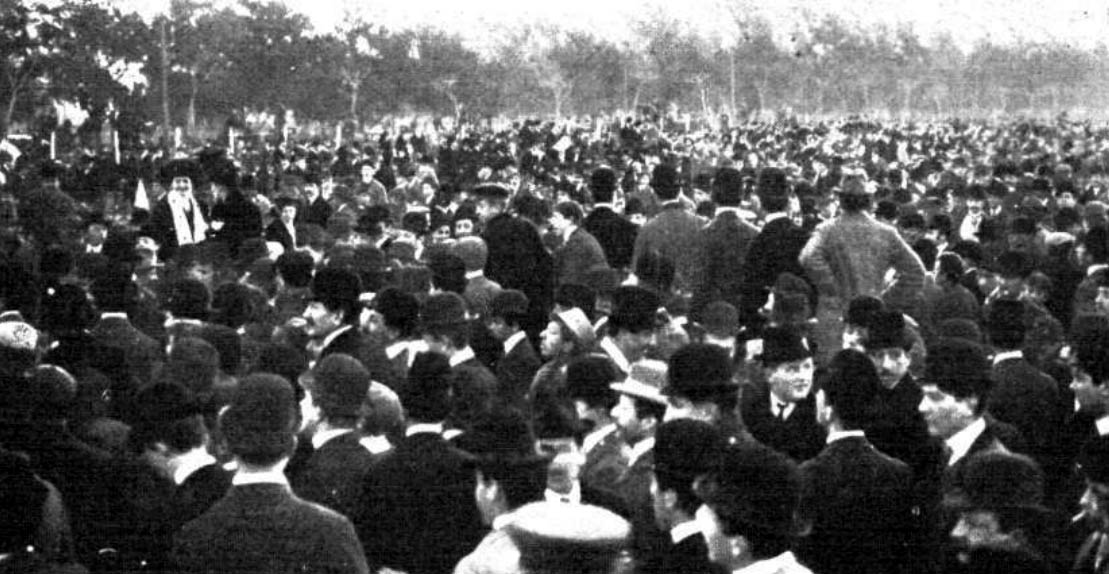
The crowd that attended the match in 1907

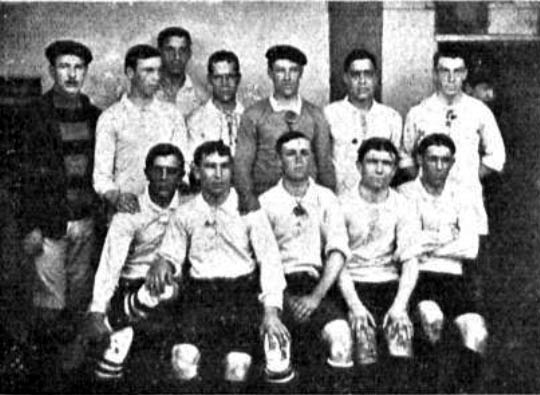
In the 1910 edition Uruguay wore the light blue shirt for the first time

Short movie of the 1928 edition

Ed.	Year	Champion	Score	City	Venue
1	1905	Uruguay	0–0	Buenos Aires (Note: Uruguay won the trophy as visiting team.)	Sociedad Sportiva
2	1906	Argentina	2–0	Montevideo	Parque Central
3	1907	Argentina	2–1	Buenos Aires	Estudiantes (BA) (Note: The first field of the club, located in Palermo, Buenos Aires.)
4	1908	Argentina	2–2	Montevideo (Note: Argentina won the trophy as visiting team.)	Parque Central
5	1909	Argentina	2–1	Buenos Aires	GEBA
6	1910	Uruguay	3–1	Montevideo	Belvedere
7	1911	Uruguay	2–0	Buenos Aires	GEBA
8	1912	Uruguay	2–0	Montevideo	Parque Central
9	1913	Argentina	4–0	Avellaneda	Racing
10	1915	Argentina	2–1	Buenos Aires	GEBA
11	1916	Argentina	2–1	Montevideo	Parque Central
12	1917	Argentina	1–0	Avellaneda	Racing
13	1918	Argentina	1–1	Montevideo	Parque Pereira
14	1919	Uruguay	2–1	Buenos Aires	GEBA
15	1922	Uruguay	1–0	Montevideo	Parque Central
16	1923	Uruguay	0–0	Buenos Aires	Sp. Barracas
17	1927	Uruguay	1–0	Buenos Aires	Boca Juniors
18	1928	Argentina	2–2	Montevideo	Parque Central
19	1929	Uruguay	0–0	Buenos Aires	San Lorenzo
20	1937	Argentina	5–1	Buenos Aires	Independiente
21	1942	Argentina	1–1	Montevideo	Centenario
22	1945	Argentina	2–2	Montevideo	Centenario
23	1957	Uruguay	1–1	Buenos Aires	Huracán
24	1962	Argentina	3–1	Buenos Aires	River Plate
25	1968	Argentina	2–0	Buenos Aires	River Plate
26	1973	Uruguay	1–1	Buenos Aires	Vélez Sársfield
27	1976	Argentina	4–1	Buenos Aires	Vélez Sársfield (Note: Also valid for 1976 Taça do Atlântico.)
28	1992	Argentina	0–0	Montevideo	Centenario

=== Titles by country ===
Team	Titles	Years won
Argentina	17	1906, 1907, 1908, 1909, 1913, 1915, 1916, 1917, 1918, 1928, 1937, 1942, 1945, 1962, 1968, 1976, 1992
Uruguay	11	1905, 1910, 1911, 1912, 1919, 1922, 1923, 1927, 1929, 1957, 1973

=== Overall ===
M	AW	D	UW	GA	GU
28	11	11	6	41	28

== All-time scorers ==
- (Uruguay) José Piendibene 3
- (Uruguay) Hector Scarone 3
- (Uruguay) Carlos Scarone 3

== Most finals by player ==
- 10: (Uruguay) Cayetano Saporiti (won 5)
- 9: (Uruguay) Angel Romano (won 6), (Argentina) Juan Domingo Brown (won 5)
- 7: (Uruguay) Pablo Dacal (won 4), (Argentina) Eliseo Brown (won 3)
- 6: (Uruguay) José Piendibene (won 3), (Argentina) Juan Enrique Hayes (won 2)
- 5: (Argentina) Jorge Brown (won 3), (Argentina) Carlos Tomás Wilson (won 2), (Uruguay) Juan Carlos Bertone (won 2)
- 4: (Uruguay) Hector Scarone (won 3), (Uruguay) Carlos Scarone (won 2), (Argentina) Alexander Watson Hutton (won 3), (Argentina) Ernesto Brown (won 2), (Argentina) Pedro Calomino (won 1)
- 3: (Uruguay) Pedro Petrone (won 2), (Uruguay) Hector Castro (won 1)

== See also ==
- Argentina–Uruguay football rivalry
