= Juan Cabano =

Argentine footballer

Personal information
- Date of birth: 8 July 1896
- Date of death: 15 September 1949 (aged 53)
- Position: Forward

Senior career*
Years	Team	Apps	(Gls)
1914–1916	Argentino de Quilmes		

International career
1914–1916	Argentina	2	(0)
Medal record
Men's football
Representing Argentina
South American Championship
Runner-up	1916 Argentina
- * Club domestic league appearances and goals

Juan Cabano (8 July 1896 – 15 September 1949) was an Argentine footballer. He played in two matches for the Argentina national football team from 1914 to 1916. He was also part of Argentina's squad for the 1916 South American Championship.
