= Guillermo Dannaher =

Argentine footballer

Guillermo Federico Dannaher
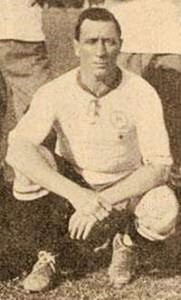
- Dannaher in Huracán, c.1921

Personal information
- Date of birth: 1890
- Place of birth: Rosario, Santa Fe, Argentina
- Position: Forward

Senior career*
Years	Team	Apps	(Gls)
1910–1913 1913–1914	Tiro Federal; Argentino de Quilmes		
1917 1920–1923 1923–1925	Atlanta; Club Atlético Huracán; Quilmes Atlético Club		

International career
1913–1914	Argentina		(7)
Medal record
- * Club domestic league appearances and goals

Guillermo Dannaher (1890–1927) was an Argentine footballer, who played as a forward for the Club Atlético Atlanta, Huracán and Quilmes. He also played for the Argentina national team, disputing the Copa Udaondo, Copa Premio Honor Argentino and Copa Círculo de Prensa of 1913.
