= Juan Enrique Hayes =

Argentine footballer (1891–1976)

Harry Hayes
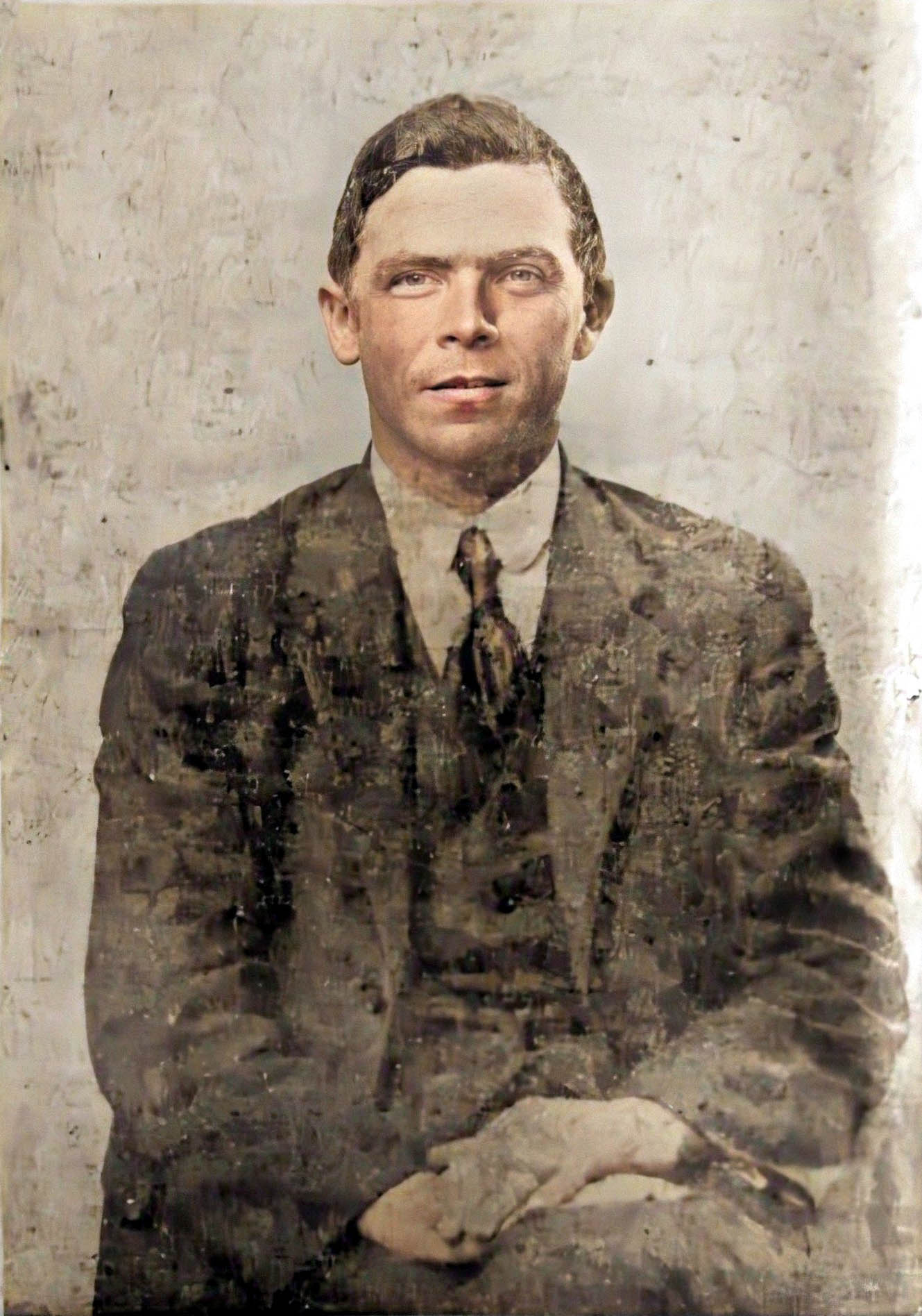

Personal information
- Full name: John Henry Hayes
- Date of birth: 20 January 1891
- Place of birth: Rosario, Argentina
- Date of death: 25 July 1976 (aged 85)
- Position: Forward

Youth career
- Club Gimnasia y Esgrima de Rosario

Senior career*
Years	Team	Apps	(Gls)
1906–1926	Rosario Central		

International career
1910–1919	Argentina	25	(9)
Medal record
Men's football
Representing Argentina
South American Championship
Runner-up	1916 Argentina
- * Club domestic league appearances and goals

John Henry Hayes (Juan Enrique Hayes, 20 January 1891 – 25 July 1976, mostly known as Harry Hayes) was an Argentine footballer, who played his entire career for Rosario Central (where he spent 20 years). Hayes also played for the Argentina national team.

Nicknamed Harry, Maestro, and Inglés, Hayes, with 228 official goals (including AFA and Liga Rosarina competitions) is the all-time leading top scorer in the history of Rosario Central. (Note: This statistic is incomplete so there are unrecorded matches played by the club (and Hayes himself).) His brother Ennis was another notable player for Rosario Central in the 1910s and 1920s.

== Club career ==
Harry Hayes was the son of English immigrants who had travelled to Argentina on a coal ship. He was born in the Arroyito district of Rosario in 1891. As a child he attended games at the Rosario Central and dreamed of becoming a footballer.

In his youth, Hayes played for Club Gimnasia y Esgrima de Rosario. In 1905, he moved to Rosario Central at only 14 years old. In 1906, he made his debut with the senior squad, where he remained until his retirement in 1926.

== International career ==
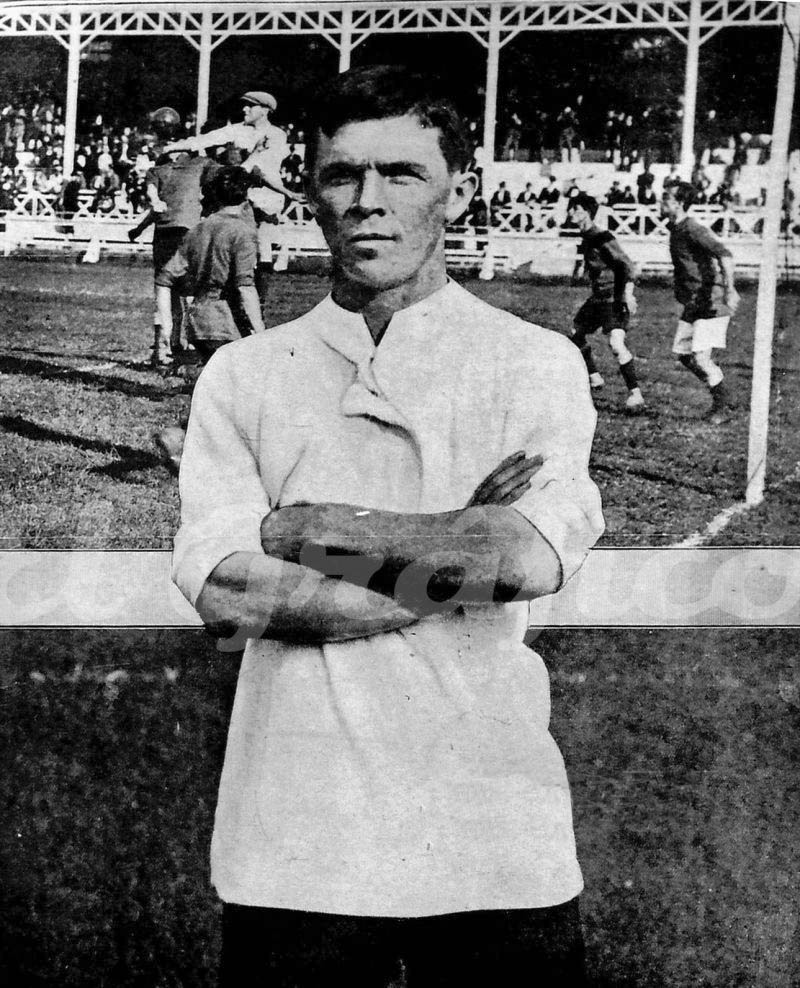
Hayes with Argentina

In 1910, Hayes made his debut for Argentina, in the 1910 South American Championship (named Copa Centenario Revolución de Mayo, held as part of the celebrations of the Argentina Centennial), where he debuted scoring to Chile.

Hayes (the second player in Rosario Central's history to be called up for Argentina after Zenón Díaz) went on to play 25 games for his country, scoring 9 goals, being also part of the Argentina squad for the 1916 South American Championship, the first official national team competition in the continent.

I had a very strong shot in those times, which can be verified looking at the windows of the surrounding houses... I had never played official matches until the day when I was called due to one player of the third division hadn't attend the match so I debuted as centre forward. I don't know if I played well or not, but the fact is I scored three goals so three months after I was promoted to second division, and the following day I not only debuted in Primera but I also took my girlfriend to the matches...

— Hayes in an interview published in the magazine edited for the 50th. anniversary of Rosario Central, 1949.

== Style of play ==
Hayes was acknowledged for being an extraordinary scorer with a strong shot, dribbling ability, and precision for short passes.

== Post-retirement ==
After retiring from football, Hayes worked as advisor for Rosario Central, being also coach in the Liga Rosarina de Football.

== Personal life ==
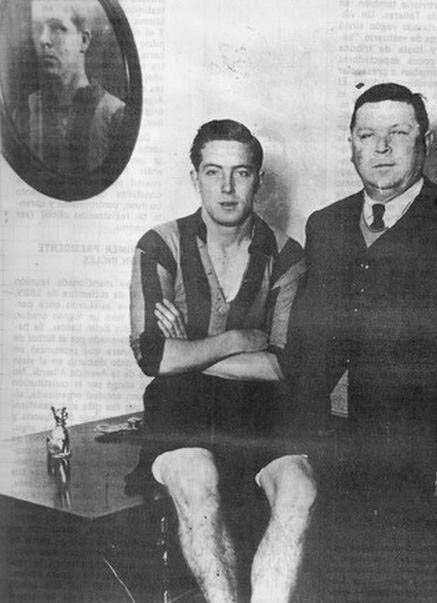
Hayes with his son Harry in 1940

Hayes' brother Ennis was also a notable footballer for Rosario Central and Argentina, and his son Enrique Ricardo (also commonly called "Harry") played for Rosario Central in the 1930s and 40s.

Alumni's legend Jorge Brown once invited Hayes to join his team, but Hayes declined the offer stating that "Thank you, Jorge, but I can’t leave Rosario Central. I live for this club", which granted him a congratulation from Brown, who replied "I would’ve done the same for Alumni".

During an interview with El Gráfico in 1961, Hayes said about football: "I don’t like what I’ve seen in recent years. It’s all about not losing, and that ruins the game".

== Honours ==
Rosario Central

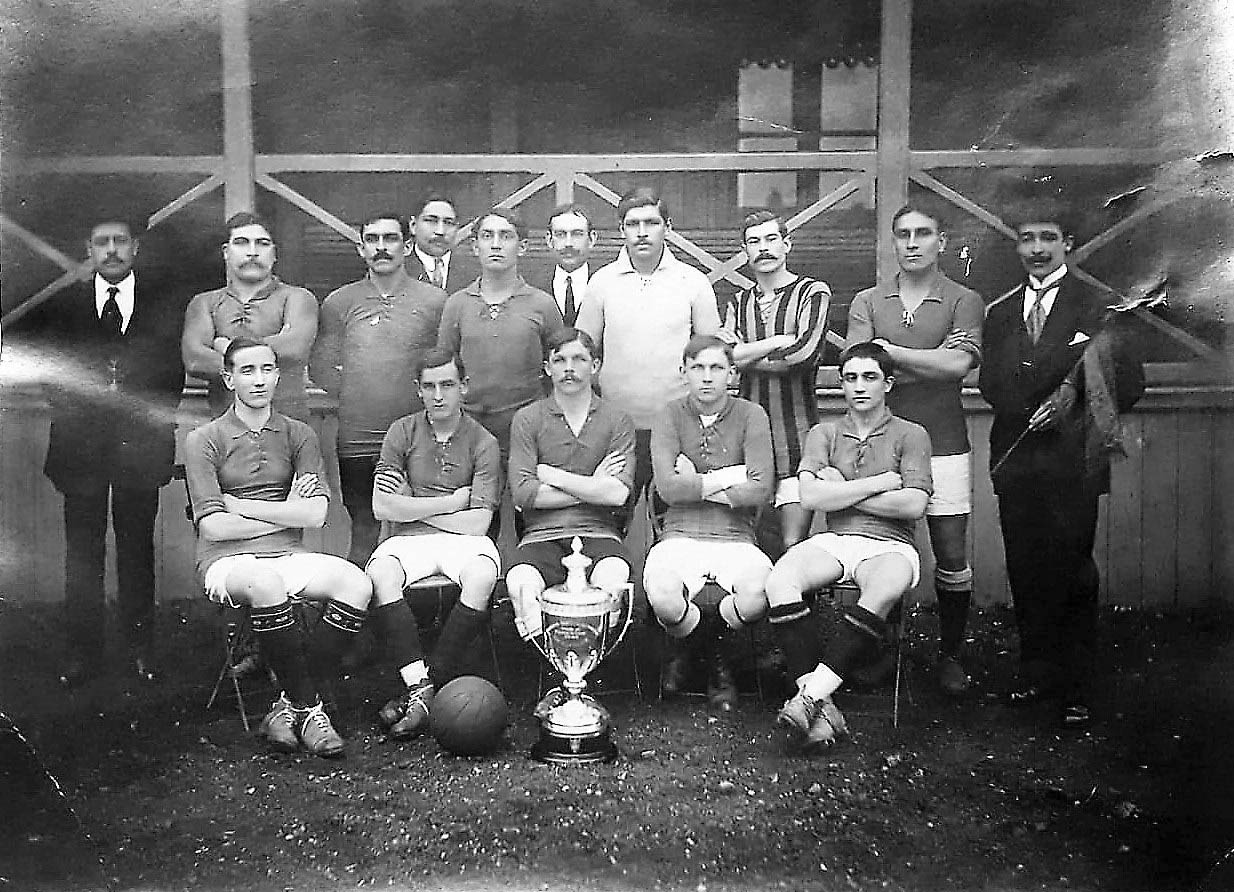
Hayes (seated, third from left) with the Rosario Central team, posing with the Copa de Competencia La Nación trophy in 1913

- Copa de Competencia La Nación: 1913
- Copa Ibarguren: 1915
- Copa Honor MCBA: 1916
- Copa de Competencia Jockey Club: 1916
- Copa Competencia (AAmF): 1920
- Copa Nicasio Vila (7): 1908, 1914, 1915, 1916, 1917, 1919, 1923
- Copa Damas de Caridad: 1910, 1914, 1915, 1916
- Federación Rosarina de Football (Note: Dissident body from Liga Rosarina; lasted from 1912 to 1914.): 1913
- Asociación Amateurs Rosarina de Football: 1920, 1921
- Copa Estímulo: 1922

Argentina

- Copa Centenario Revolución de Mayo: 1910
- Copa Newton: 1911
- Copa Premier Honor Argentino: 1911, 1913
- Copa Premier Honor Uruguayo: 1915
- Copa Lipton: 1915, 1916
- Copa Círculo de la Prensa: 1916
