= Atilio Badalini =

Argentine footballer

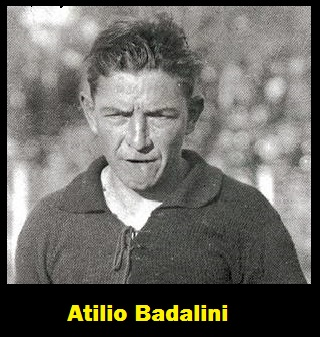

Personal information
- Date of birth: 12 May 1899
- Date of death: 3 September 1953 (aged 54)
- Position: Forward

International career
| Years | Team | Apps | (Gls) |
| 1916 | Argentina | 1 | (0) |

Atilio Badalini (12 May 1899 – 3 September 1953) was an Argentine footballer. He played in one match for the Argentina national football team in 1916. He was also part of Argentina's squad for the 1920 South American Championship.
