= Ángel Romano =

Uruguayan footballer (1893–1972)

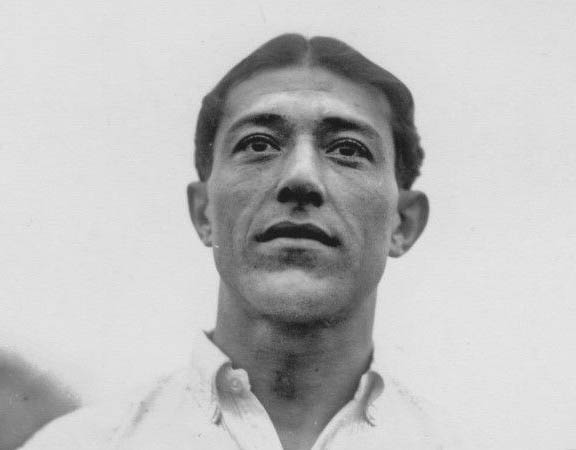

Personal information
- Full name: Alfredo Ángel Romano
- Date of birth: 2 August 1893
- Place of birth: Montevideo, Uruguay
- Date of death: 22 August 1972 (aged 79)
- Place of death: Montevideo, Uruguay
- Positions: Second striker; inside forward

Senior career*
Years	Team	Apps	(Gls)
1910	Nacional		
1911–1913	CURCC		
1913–1915	Boca Juniors		
1915–1930	Nacional		

International career
1911–1927	Uruguay	70	(28)
Medal record
Men's football
Representing Uruguay
Olympic Games
Gold medal – first place	1924 Paris	Team
South American Championship
Winner	1916 Argentina
Winner	1917 Uruguay
Winner	1920 Chile
Winner	1923 Uruguay
Winner	1924 Uruguay
Winner	1926 Chile
Runner-up	1919 Brazil
Third place	1921 Argentina
Third place	1922 Brazil
- * Club domestic league appearances and goals

Alfredo Ángel Romano (2 August 1893 – 22 August 1972) was a Uruguayan professional footballer. A striker, he played 70 games for his national team between 1911 and 1927, scoring 28 goals. He played in the Copa América nine times, winning the title a record six times, losing one final and finishing third twice. He was also part of the Uruguay national team that won the football tournament in the 1924 Olympics.

Romano played club football for Nacional between 1910 and 1930, scoring 164 goals in 388 games. The club won 22 titles during his time as a player. He won a total of 32 official titles in his career, 46 including the friendly tournaments. He retired at the age of 37.

== Honours ==
=== Club ===
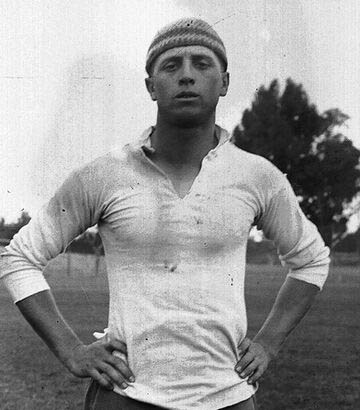
Romano with the Uruguay national team

CURCC

- Primera División: 1911
- Copa de Honor: 1911
- Copa de Honor Cousenier: 1911

Nacional

- Primera División: 1915, 1916, 1917, 1919, 1920, 1922, 1923 (AUF), 1924 (AUF)
- Copa de Honor: 1915, 1916, 1917
- Copa de Competencia: 1915, 1919, 1921, 1923
- Tie Cup: 1915
- Copa de Honor Cousenier: 1915, 1916, 1917
- Copa Aldao: 1916, 1919, 1920

=== National team ===
Uruguay

- Copa América: 1916, 1917, 1920, 1923, 1924, 1926
- Summer Olympics Gold Medal: 1924
- Copa Lipton (friendly): 1911, 1912, 1919, 1922, 1923
- Copa Newton (friendly): 1912, 1917, 1919, 1920
- Copa Premier Honor Uruguayo (friendly): 1911, 1912, 1918, 1919, 1920
