= Juan Carlos Bertone =

Uruguayan footballer and manager

Personal information
- Full name: Juan Carlos Bertone
- Place of birth: Montevideo, Uruguay
- Date of death: 1938
- Place of death: Uruguay
- Position: Centre-half

Senior career*
Years	Team	Apps	(Gls)
1906–1910	Montevideo Wanderers		
- Americano
1916	Comercial-SP		

International career
1906–1911	Uruguay	12	(1)

Managerial career
- 1920–1922: Chile
- 1935–1936: Deportivo Viña del Mar
- * Club domestic league appearances and goals

Juan Carlos Bertone (unknown – 1938) was an Uruguayan football player and manager.

== Playing career ==
=== Club ===
A centre-half, an older version of a centre-back, Bertone played for Montevideo Wanderers in his homeland, Americano and Comercial-SP in Brazil.

=== International ===
Bertone represented the Uruguay national team from 1906 to 1911, making twelve appearances and becoming the team captain. He scored a goal in the 2–2 draw against Argentina on 15 August 1908.

== Coaching career ==
Bertone led the Chile national team in both the 1920 and the 1922 South American Championships. He was nicknamed Maestro (Master).

Following Chile, he led the Chilean club Deportivo Viña del Mar.

== Legacy ==
Club Social y De Deportes Juan Carlos Bertone from Villa Alemana, Chile, was founded in his honor on 9 February 1940 after his death in 1938.
