= Copa Newton =

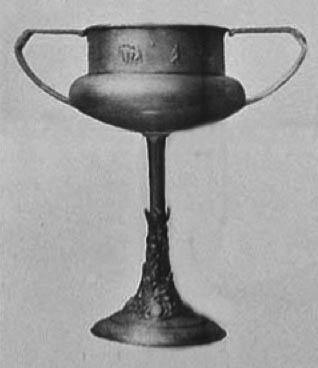
- The trophy given to champions
- Organising body: (Argentina) AFA (Uruguay) AUF
- Founded: 1906
- Abolished: 1976; 49 years ago
- Region: Argentina, Uruguay
- Number of teams: 2
- Related competitions: Copa Lipton
- Last champions: Argentina (1976)
- Most successful team(s): Argentina (17 titles)

Copa Newton was a football friendly competition contested between Argentina and Uruguay. The trophy, donated by Nicanor Newton, was contested 28 times between 1906 and 1976.

== History ==
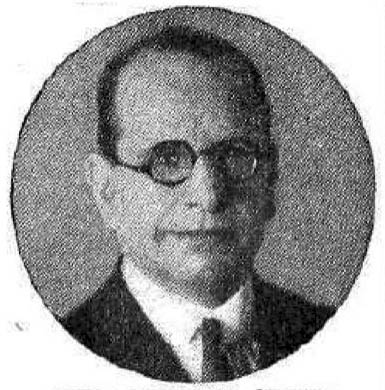
Nicanor Newton donated the trophy

Nicanor Newton, director of Sportsman magazine, donated the trophy for a competition which would be held for beneficial purposes. The competition (therefore named "Copa Newton") was first held in 1906, one year after the first edition of Copa Lipton, and was continued on an annual basis until 1930, with the exception of 1910, 1914, 1921, 1923 and 1925–1926.

It has only been played sporadically since, with just 8 editions played over four decades between 1937 and 1976.

The cup has been contested 28 times in total, with Argentina the winners on 17 occasions and Uruguay on 11.

== List of champions ==
=== Finals ===
The following list includes all the editions of the Copa Newton:

Ed.	Year	Champion	Score	City	Venue
1	1906	Argentina	2–1	Buenos Aires	Sociedad Sportiva
2	1907	Argentina	2–1	Montevideo	Parque Central
3	1908	Argentina	2–1	Buenos Aires	GEBA
4	1909	Argentina	2–2	Montevideo (Note: Argentina won the trophy as visiting team.)	Belvedere
5	1911	Argentina	3–2	Montevideo	Parque Central
6	1912	Uruguay	3–3	Avellaneda (Note: Uruguay won the trophy as visiting team.)	Racing
7	1913	Uruguay	1–0	Montevideo	Parque Central
8	1915	Uruguay	2–0	Montevideo	Parque Central
9	1916	Argentina	3–1	Avellaneda	Racing
10	1917	Uruguay	1–0	Montevideo	Parque Central
11	1918	Argentina	2–0	Buenos Aires	GEBA
12	1919	Uruguay	2–1	Montevideo	Parque Pereira
13	1920	Uruguay	3–1	Buenos Aires	Sportivo Barracas
14	1922	Uruguay	2–2	Buenos Aires	Sportivo Barracas
15	1923 (Note: The 1923 and 1924 editions had the particulatiry of two matches being held on the same day, 25 May 1924. One match was held in Montevideo, and the other in Buenos Aires. The match in Montevideo was considered part of the 1923 edition.)	Uruguay	2–0	Montevideo	Parque Central
16	1924	Argentina	4–0	Buenos Aires	Sportivo Barracas
17	1927	Argentina	1–0	Montevideo	Parque Central
18	1928	Argentina	1–0	Avellaneda	Independiente
19	1929	Uruguay	2–1	Montevideo	Parque Central
20	1930	Uruguay	1–1	Buenos Aires	San Lorenzo
21	1937	Argentina	3–0	Montevideo	Centenario
22	1942	Argentina	4–1	Buenos Aires	River Plate
23	1945	Argentina	6–2	Buenos Aires	San Lorenzo
24	1957	Argentina	0–0	Montevideo	Centenario
25	1968	Uruguay	2–1	Montevideo	Centenario
26	1973	Argentina	1–1	Montevideo	Centenario
27	1975	Argentina	3–2	Montevideo	Centenario
28	1976	Argentina	3–0	Montevideo (Note: Also valid for 1976 Taça do Atlântico.)	Centenario

=== Titles by country ===
Team	Titles	Years won
Argentina	17	1906, 1907, 1908, 1909, 1911, 1916, 1918, 1924, 1927, 1928, 1937, 1942, 1945, 1957, 1973, 1975, 1976
Uruguay	11	1912, 1913, 1915, 1917, 1919, 1920, 1922, 1923, 1929, 1930, 1968

=== Overall ===
M	AW	D	UW	GA	GU
28	14	6	8	52	35

== All-time scorers ==
- (Uruguay) Angel Romano 4
- (Argentina) Eliseo Brown 4
- (Argentina) / (Scotland) Alexander Watson Hutton 3
- (Uruguay) Jose Piendibene 3
- (Argentina) O.Goicoechea 3
- (Uruguay) Carlos Scarone 2
- (Argentina) Jorge Valdano 2

== Most finals by player ==
- 8: (Uruguay) Angel Romano (won 4), (Uruguay) Cayetano Saporiti (won 3)
- 6: (Uruguay) Alfredo Foglino (won 5), (Argentina) Pedro Calomino (won 2)
- 5: (Argentina) Carlos Tomás Wilson (won 4), (Argentina) Eliseo Brown (won 4), (Uruguay) José Piendibene (won 3), (Uruguay) Carlos Scarone (won 3), (Uruguay) Hector Scarone (won 3), (Uruguay) Pablo Dacal (won 3), (Argentina) Juan Domingo Brown (won 2), (Uruguay) Juan Carlos Bertone (won 1)
- 4: (Argentina) Juan Enrique Hayes (won 2),
- 3: (Argentina) Jorge Brown (won 3), (Argentina) Alfredo Brown (won 3), (Argentina) Alexander Watson Hutton (won 2), (Uruguay) Pedro Petrone (won 1)

== See also ==
- Argentina–Uruguay football rivalry
