= Pablo Dacal =

Uruguayan footballer (1886-1961)

Personal information
- Date of birth: 30 June 1886
- Place of birth: Montevideo, Uruguay
- Date of death: 1961
- Position: Midfielder

Senior career*
| Years | Team | Apps | (Gls) |
| 1908-1911 | River Plate F.C. | | |
| 1912-1916 | Nacional | | |
| 1917-1918 | Montevideo Wanderers | | |
| 1920 | Nacional | | |

International career
| 1908–1916 | Uruguay | 31 | (6) |
Medal record
Men's football
Representing Uruguay
South American Championship
| Winner | 1916 Argentina |
- * Club domestic league appearances and goals

Pablo Dacal (30 June 1886–1961) was a Uruguayan footballer. He played in 31 matches for the Uruguay national football team from 1908 to 1916. He was also part of Uruguay's squad for the 1916 South American Championship.

== Honours ==
River Plate F.C.

- Primera División: 1908, 1910

Nacional

- Primera División: 1912, 1915, 1916, 1920

Uruguay

- Copa América: 1916
