= List of Uruguayan Primera División top scorers =

This is a list of Uruguayan Primera División top scorers, that enumerates all players that have finished a season as top goalscorers in the top level of the Uruguayan football league system from 1900 (the year that the first championship was held) to date.

== All-time top scorers ==
The chart includes championships since 1900 to present days. Atilio García has the record of being top scorer in most seasons, with 8 (7 of them consecutively). On the other hand, Fernando Morena holds the record of most goals scored in one season (36 in 1978).

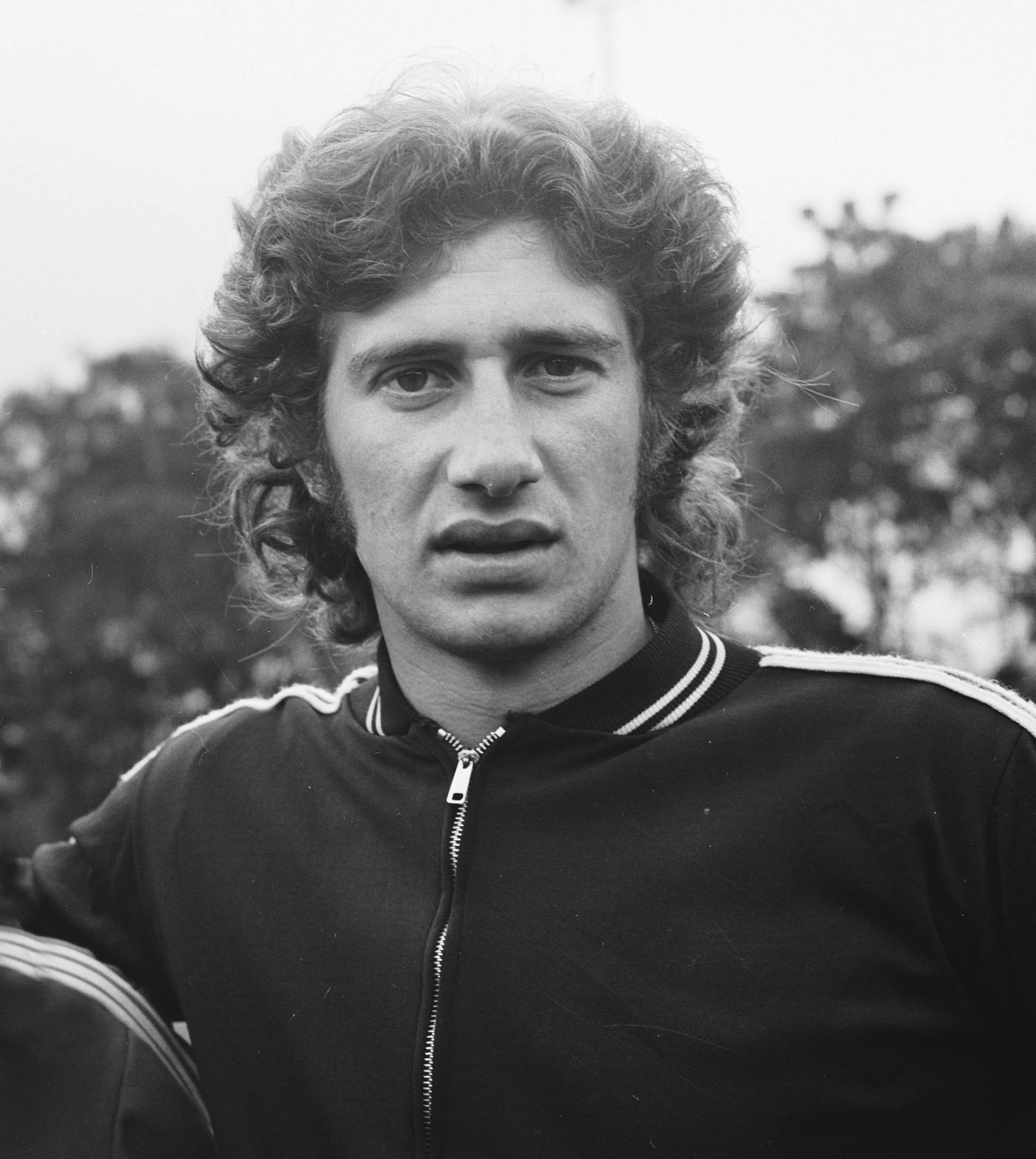
Fernando Morena (here pictured in 1974) is the all-time topscorer of Primera División

Pos.	Player	Period	Goals	Matches
1	(Uruguay) Fernando Morena	1969–84	230	244
2	(Argentina) Atilio García	1938–50	208	210
3	(Uruguay) Héctor Scarone	1916–34	163	191
4	(Uruguay) Pablo Terevinto	1920–31	124	157
5	(Ecuador) Alberto Spencer	1960–70	113	166
6	(Uruguay) René Borjas	1920–31	109	199
7	(Uruguay) Héctor Castro	1921–36	107	181
8	(Uruguay) Óscar Míguez	1948–60	107	137
9	(Uruguay) Juan Ignazio Ramirez	2015-2023	105	213
10	(Uruguay) Pedro Petrone	1923–33	103	97

== Top scorers by year ==
Season	Player	Club	Goals
1900	(Scotland) James Buchanan	CURCC	6
1901	(Uruguay) Juan Pena	CURCC	6
1902	(Uruguay) Bolívar Céspedes	Nacional	11
1903	(Uruguay) Juan Pena	CURCC	16
1904	(No championship held) (Note: The 1904 championship was not played due to the Battle of Masoller)		
1905	(Uruguay) Aniceto Camacho	CURCC	6
1906	(Uruguay) Rafael de Miquelerena	Montevideo Wanderers	6
1907	(Uruguay) José Zuazú	Nacional	7
(no records for the 1908–1926 period)
1927	(Uruguay) Conrado Bidegain	Rampla Juniors	13
(no records for the 1927–1928 period)
1930	(No championship held) (Note: No championship was played because of the 1930 FIFA World Cup.)		
1931	(no records)		
1932	(Uruguay) Juan Labraga	Rampla Juniors	17
1933	(Uruguay) Pedro Young	Peñarol	33
1934	(Uruguay) Aníbal Ciocca	Nacional	13
1935	(Uruguay) Antonio Castaldo	Defensor	12
1936	(Uruguay) Aníbal Ciocca	Nacional	14
1937	(Uruguay) Horacio Tellechea	Peñarol	16
1938	(Argentina) Atilio García	Nacional	20
1939	(Argentina) Atilio García	Nacional	22
1940	(Argentina) Atilio García	Nacional	18
1941	(Argentina) Atilio García	Nacional	23
1942	(Argentina) Atilio García	Nacional|	19
1943	(Argentina) Atilio García	Nacional	18
1944	(Argentina) Atilio García	Nacional	21
1945	(Uruguay) Nicolás Falero	Central Español	21
1945	(Uruguay) Raúl Schiaffino	Peñarol	21
1946	(Argentina) Atilio García	Nacional	21
1947	(Uruguay) Nicolás Falero	Peñarol	17
1948	(Uruguay) Óscar Míguez	Peñarol	8 (Note: Championship unfinished)
1949	(Uruguay) Óscar Míguez	Peñarol	20
1950	(Uruguay) Juan Ramón Orlandi	Nacional	14
1951	(Uruguay) Juan Hohberg	Peñarol	17
1952	(Uruguay) Jorge Enrico	Nacional	15
1953	(Uruguay) Juan Hohberg	Peñarol	17
1954	(Argentina) Juan Romay	Peñarol	12
1955	(Uruguay) Javier Ambrois	Nacional	17
1956	(Uruguay) Carlos Carranza	Cerro	18
1957	(Uruguay) Walter Hernández	Defensor	16
1958	(Uruguay) Manuel Pedersen	Rampla Juniors	12
1959	(Uruguay) Víctor Guaglianone	Wanderers	13
1960	(Uruguay) Ángel Cabrera	Peñarol	14
1961	(Ecuador) Alberto Spencer	Peñarol	18
1962	(Ecuador) Alberto Spencer	Peñarol	16
1963	(Uruguay) Pedro Rocha	Peñarol	18
1964	(Uruguay) Héctor Salva	Rampla Juniors	12
1965	(Uruguay) Pedro Rocha	Peñarol	15
1966	(Brazil) Araquem de Melo	Danubio	12
1967	(Ecuador) Alberto Spencer	Peñarol	11
1968	(Ecuador) Alberto Spencer	Peñarol	8
1968	(Uruguay) Pedro Rocha	Peñarol	8
1968	(Uruguay) Ruben García	Cerro	8
1968	(Uruguay) Rúben Bareño	Cerro	8
1969	(Argentina) Luis Artime	Nacional	24
1970	(Argentina) Luis Artime	Nacional	21
1971	(Argentina) Luis Artime	Nacional	16
1972	(Argentina) Juan Carlos Mamelli	Nacional	20
1973	(Uruguay) Fernando Morena	Peñarol	23
1974	(Uruguay) Fernando Morena	Peñarol	27
1975	(Uruguay) Fernando Morena	Peñarol	34
1976	(Uruguay) Fernando Morena	Peñarol	18
1977	(Uruguay) Fernando Morena	Peñarol	19
1978	(Uruguay) Fernando Morena	Peñarol	36
1979	(Uruguay) Waldemar Victorino	Nacional	19
1980	(Uruguay) Jorge Luis Siviero	Rentistas	19
1981	(Uruguay) Rubén Paz	Peñarol	17
1982	(Uruguay) Fernando Morena	Peñarol	17
1983	(Uruguay) Arsenio Luzardo	Nacional	13
1984	(Uruguay) José Villareal	Central Español	18
1985	(Uruguay) Antonio Alzamendi	Peñarol	13
1986	(Uruguay) Juan Ramón Carrasco	Nacional	11
1986	(Uruguay) Gerardo Miranda	Defensor	11
1987	(Uruguay) Gerardo Miranda	Defensor	13
1988	(Uruguay) Rubén da Silva	Danubio	23
1989	(Uruguay) Diego Aguirre	Peñarol	7
1989	(Uruguay) Johnny Miqueiro	Progreso	7
1989	(Uruguay) Óscar Quagliata	Huracán Buceo	7
1990	(Uruguay) Adolfo Barán	Peñarol	13
1991	(Panama) Julio Dely Valdés	Nacional	16
1992	(Panama) Julio Dely Valdés	Nacional	13
1993	(Uruguay) Wilmar Cabrera	Huracán Buceo	12
1994	(Uruguay) Darío Silva	Peñarol	19
1995	(Uruguay) Juan González	Nacional	16
1996	(Uruguay) Juan González	Nacional	13
1997	(Uruguay) Pablo Bengoechea	Peñarol	10
1998	(Uruguay) Martín Rodríguez	River Plate	13
1998	(Uruguay) Rubén Sosa	Nacional	13
1999	(Uruguay) Gabriel Álvez	Nacional	24
2000	(Uruguay) Javier Chevantón	Danubio	33
2001	(Brazil) Eliomar Marcón	Defensor Sporting	21
2002	(Uruguay) Germán Hornos	Fénix	25
2003	(Uruguay) Alexander Medina	Liverpool	22
2004	(Uruguay) Carlos Bueno	Peñarol	26
2004	(Uruguay) Alexander Medina	Nacional	26
2005	(Uruguay) Pablo Granoche	Miramar Misiones	16
2005–06	(Uruguay) Pedro Cardoso	Rocha	17
2006–07	(Uruguay) Aldo Díaz	Tacuarembó	15
2007–08	(Australia) Richard Porta	CA River Plate	19
2007–08	(Uruguay) Cristhian Stuani	Danubio	19
2008–09	(Uruguay) Antonio Pacheco	Peñarol	12
2008–09	(Uruguay) Liber Quiñones	Racing	12
2009–10	(Uruguay) Antonio Pacheco	Peñarol	23
2010–11	(Uruguay) Santiago García	Nacional	23
2011–12	(Australia) Richard Porta	Nacional	17
2012–13	(Uruguay) Juan Manuel Olivera	Peñarol	18
2013–14	(Uruguay) Héctor Acuña	Cerro	20
2014–15	(Uruguay) Iván Alonso	Nacional	22
2015–16	(Uruguay) Gastón Rodríguez	M. Wanderers	19
2015–16	(Uruguay) Junior Arias	Liverpool	19
2016	(Uruguay) Pablo Silva	Villa Española	8
2016	(Uruguay) Gabriel Fernández	Racing	8
2017	(Uruguay) Cristian Palacios	Wanderers / Peñarol	29
2018	(Argentina) Gonzalo Bergessio	Nacional	17
2019	(Uruguay) Juan Ignacio Ramírez	Liverpool	24
2020	(Argentina) Gonzalo Bergessio	Nacional	25
2021	(Uruguay) Maximiliano Silvera	Cerrito	22
2022	(Uruguay) Thiago Borbas	River Plate	18
2023	(Uruguay) Ignacio Ramírez	Nacional	19
2024	(Uruguay) Leonardo Fernández	Peñarol	16
