= 1923 Uruguayan Primera División =

1923 Uruguayan Primera División can refer to:

- 1923 Uruguayan Primera División of AUF, Uruguayan championship organized by the Uruguayan Football Association (AUF).
- 1923 Uruguayan Primera División of FUF, Uruguayan championship organized by the Uruguayan Football Federation (FUF).
