= FUF Campeonato Uruguayo =

Uruguayan football tournament

The FUF Campeonato Uruguayo was a football tournament held in Uruguay between 1923 and 1925, during the schism of Uruguayan football.

It was organized by the Uruguayan Football Federation ("Federación Uruguaya de Fútbol" – FUF), entity dissident of the Uruguayan Football Association (AUF), founded after the resignation of AUF of Peñarol and Central occurred during the 1922 Uruguayan championship.

Only two tournaments (1923 and 1924) came to complete, since in 1925 the Uruguayan government intervention to achieve unification interrupted football championship that year.

== List of champions ==
Uruguayan Football Federation tournaments are not recognized by the Uruguayan Football Association.

=== Primera División ===
Ed.	Season	Champion	Runner-up	Third place
1	1923	Atlético Wanderers	Peñarol	Lito Cuadrado
2	1924	Peñarol	Atlético Wanderers	Lito Cuadrado
3	1925	No finished		

== Titles by club ==
Club	Titles	Runners-up	Seasons won	Seasons runner-up
Atlético Wanderers	1	1	1923	1924
Peñarol	1	1	1924	1923

== See also ==
- Uruguayan Football Federation
- Liga AUF Uruguaya
