= 1924 Uruguayan Primera División =

1924 Uruguayan Primera División can refer to:

- 1924 Uruguayan Primera División of AUF, Uruguayan championship organized by the Uruguayan Football Association (AUF).
- 1924 Uruguayan Primera División of FUF, Uruguayan championship organized by the Uruguayan Football Federation (FUF).
