= 1915 Campeonato Uruguayo Primera División =

15th season of the top-tier football league in Uruguay

Uruguayan Primera División
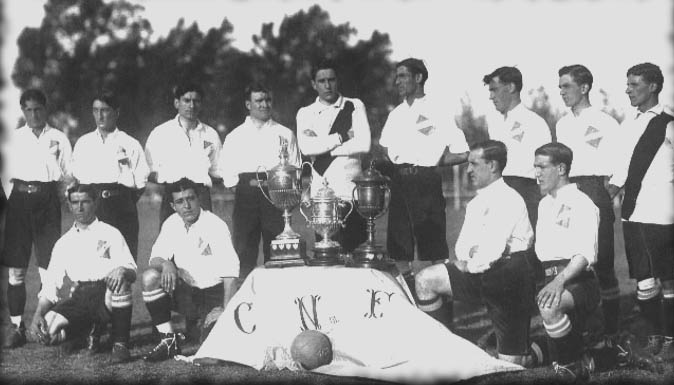
- Nacional, champions
- Season: 1915 (15th)
- Champions: Nacional
- Relegated: Bristol and Independencia
- Matches: 90
- Goals: 195 (2.17 per match)

The Uruguayan Championship 1915 was the 15th season of Uruguay's top-flight football league.

== Overview ==
The tournament consisted of a two-wheel championship of all against all. It involved ten teams, and the champion was Nacional.

Club Atlético Defensor first appeared in this season. Afterwards, Bristol and Independencia were relegated.

== Teams ==
| Team | City | Stadium | Capacity | Foundation | Seasons | Consecutive seasons | Titles | 1914 |
|---|---|---|---|---|---|---|---|---|
| Bristol | Montevideo | | | | 6 | - | - | - |
| Central | Montevideo | | | 5 January 1905 | 6 | 6 | - | 7th |
| Defensor | Montevideo | | | 15 March 1913 | - | - | - | - |
| Independencia | Montevideo | | | | 1 | 1 | - | 8th |
| Nacional | Montevideo | Gran Parque Central | 15,000 | 14 May 1899 | 13 | 13 | 3 | 3rd |
| CURCC / Peñarol (Note: Controversy exists on the date of the founding of C.A. Peñarol. The club's official position assumes a change of name of CURCC (founded on December 28, 1891). On the other hand, some historians state that "C.A. Peñarol" was established on December 13, 1913.) | Montevideo | | | 28 September 1891 | 14 | 14 | 5 | 2nd |
| Reformers | Montevideo | | | | 2 | 2 | - | 6th |
| River Plate | Montevideo | | | 1897 | 8 | 8 | 4 | 1st |
| Universal | Montevideo | | | | 3 | 3 | - | 4th |
| Montevideo Wanderers | Montevideo | | | 15 August 1902 | 11 | 11 | 2 | 5th |

== League standings ==
| Pos | Team | Pld | W | D | L | GF | GA | GD | Pts |
|---|---|---|---|---|---|---|---|---|---|
| 1 | Nacional | 18 | 13 | 3 | 2 | 33 | 9 | +24 | 29 |
| 2 | Peñarol | 18 | 12 | 3 | 3 | 37 | 8 | +29 | 27 |
| 3 | Universal | 18 | 10 | 3 | 5 | 29 | 25 | +4 | 23 |
| 4 | Defensor | 18 | 9 | 2 | 7 | 16 | 20 | −4 | 20 |
| 5 | Montevideo Wanderers | 18 | 9 | 1 | 8 | 19 | 23 | −4 | 19 |
| 6 | River Plate | 18 | 7 | 3 | 8 | 18 | 15 | +3 | 17 |
| 7 | Central | 18 | 7 | 1 | 10 | 15 | 19 | −4 | 15 |
| 8 | Reformers | 18 | 5 | 3 | 10 | 10 | 20 | −10 | 13 |
| 9 | Bristol | 18 | 5 | 1 | 12 | 9 | 27 | −18 | 11 |
| 10 | Independencia | 18 | 2 | 2 | 14 | 9 | 29 | −20 | 6 |

Source: rsssf.com

Uruguayan Champion 1915
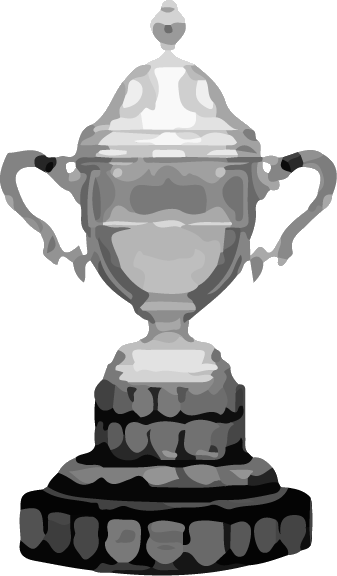
Nacional
4th title
