= 1912 Campeonato Uruguayo Primera División =

12th season of the top-tier football league in Uruguay

Uruguayan Primera División
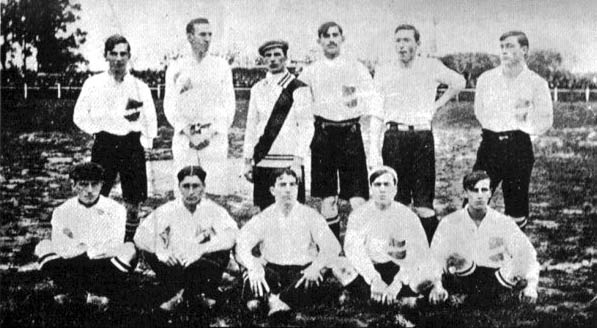
- Nacional, champions
- Season: 1912 (12th)
- Champions: Nacional
- Relegated: Dublin
- Matches: 56
- Goals: 123 (2.2 per match)

The Uruguayan Championship 1912 was the 12th season of Uruguay's top-flight football league.

== Overview ==
The tournament consisted of a two-wheel championship of all against all. It involved eight teams, and the champion was Nacional.

Dublin withdrew from the tournament after the tenth round.

== Teams ==
Team	City	Stadium	Capacity	Foundation	Seasons	Consecutive seasons	Titles	1911
Bristol	Montevideo				4	4	-	6th
CURCC	Montevideo			28 September 1891	11	11	5	1st
Central	Montevideo			5 January 1905	3	3	-	7th
Dublin	Montevideo				4	4	-	4th
Nacional	Montevideo	Gran Parque Central	15,000	14 May 1899	10	10	2	5th
River Plate	Montevideo			1897	5	5	2	3rd
Universal	Montevideo				-	-	-	-
Montevideo Wanderers	Montevideo			15 August 1902	8	8	2	2nd

== League standings ==
Pos	Team	Pld	W	D	L	GF	GA	GD	Pts
1	Nacional	14	12	1	1	28	5	+23	25
2	CURCC	14	8	3	3	21	13	+8	19
3	Montevideo Wanderers	14	7	4	3	21	14	+7	18
4	River Plate F.C.	14	7	3	4	16	9	+7	17
5	Bristol	14	3	7	4	12	14	−2	13
6	Central	14	4	4	6	9	19	−10	12
7	Universal	14	2	3	9	11	29	−18	7
8	Dublin	4	0	1	3	5	20	−15	1

Source: rsssf.com

Uruguayan Champion 1912
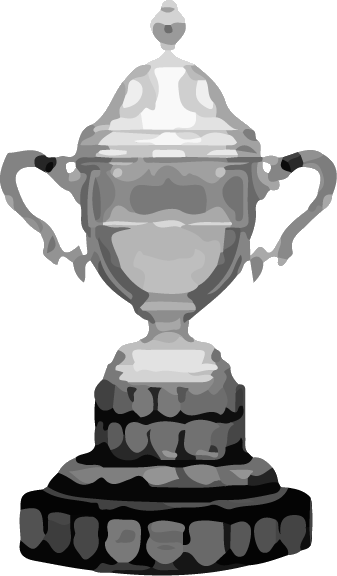
Nacional
3rd title
