= 1910 Campeonato Uruguayo Primera División =

10th season of the top-tier football league in Uruguay

Uruguayan Primera División
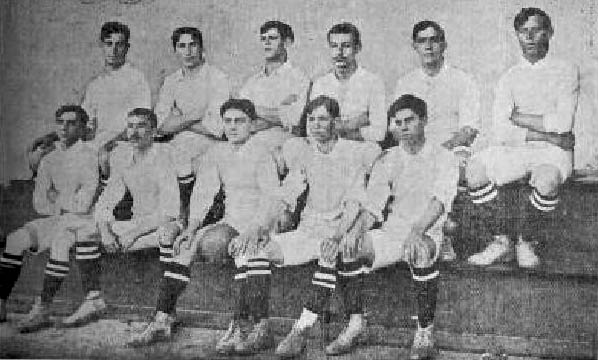
- River Plate, champions
- Season: 1910 (10th)
- Champions: River Plate
- Relegated: French
- Matches: 72
- Goals: 206 (2.86 per match)

The Uruguayan Championship 1910 was the tenth official championship of Uruguayan football history.

== Overview ==
The tournament consisted of a two-wheel championship of all against all. It involved nine teams, and the champion was River Plate F.C.

== Teams ==
Team	City	Stadium	Capacity	Foundation	Seasons	Consecutive seasons	Titles	1909
Bristol	Montevideo				2	2	-	7th
CURCC	Montevideo			28 September 1891	9	9	4	2nd
Central	Montevideo			5 January 1905	1	1	-	6th
Dublin	Montevideo				2	2	-	5th
French	Montevideo				2	2	-	10th
Libertad	Montevideo				-	-	-	-
Nacional	Montevideo	Gran Parque Central	7,000	14 May 1899	8	8	2	4th
Oriental	Montevideo				1	1	-	11th
River Plate	Montevideo			1897	3	3	1	3rd
Montevideo Wanderers	Montevideo			15 August 1902	6	6	2	1st

== League standings ==
Pos	Team	Pld	W	D	L	GF	GA	GD	Pts
1	River Plate F.C.	16	11	4	1	33	10	+23	26
2	CURCC	16	10	4	2	32	12	+20	24
3	Nacional	16	10	2	4	32	14	+18	22
4	Montevideo Wanderers	16	9	2	5	24	15	+9	20
5	Central	16	6	4	6	17	24	−7	16
6	Dublin	16	4	4	8	20	26	−6	12
7	Libertad	16	4	4	8	17	23	−6	12
8	Bristol	16	3	1	12	16	44	−28	7
9	French	16	2	1	13	15	38	−23	5

Source: rsssf.com

Uruguayan Champion 1910
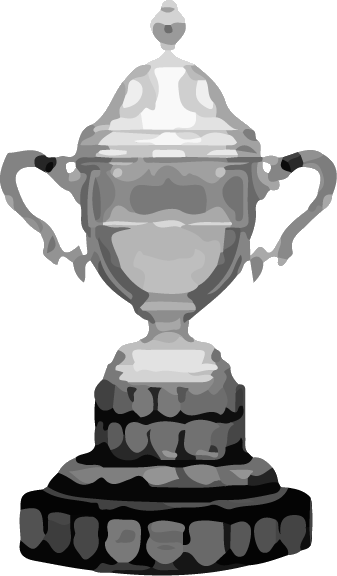
River Plate F.C.
2nd title
