= Gastón Roselló =

Uruguayan footballer (born 1997)

Personal information
- Full name: Gastón Nahuel Roselló Gazo
- Date of birth: 24 August 1997 (age 29)
- Place of birth: Montevideo, Uruguay
- Height: 1.80 m (5 ft 11 in)
- Position: Left back

Team information
- Current team: Deutscher

Youth career
- Rampla Juniors

Senior career*
Years	Team	Apps	(Gls)
2017–2018	Rampla Juniors	6	(0)
2018	Peñarol	0	(0)
2019–2020	Rampla Juniors	19	(0)
2021–2022	Uruguay Montevideo	19	(0)
2022–2023	Cipolletti	26	(0)
2023–2025	Cerrito	42	(1)
2025–2026	Atenas	15	(1)
2026–	Deutscher	0	(0)
- * Club domestic league appearances and goals as of 22:28, 9 March 2026 (UTC)

Gastón Nahuel Roselló Gazo (born 24 August 1997) is a Uruguayan footballer who plays as a defender for Primera Divisional C club Deutscher.

== Career ==
In January 2019, Roselló re-joined Rampla Juniors, after signing with Peñarol in the summer 2018.
