= 1927 Copa Aldao =

- San Lorenzo, winners
- Event: Copa Aldao
| Rampla Juniors | San Lorenzo |
| (Uruguay) | (Argentina) |
| 0 | 1 |
- Date: 30 December 1928
- Venue: Estadio Gran Parque Central, Montevideo
- Referee: Domingo Lombardi (Uruguay)

The 1927 Copa Aldao was the final match to decide the winner of the Copa Aldao, the seventh edition of the international competition organised by the Argentine and Uruguayan Associations together. The final was contested by Uruguayan side Rampla Juniors and Argentine club San Lorenzo de Almagro.

The match was played at Estadio Gran Parque Central in Montevideo, where San Lorenzo defeated Rampla Juniors 1–0, winning its first and only Copa Aldao trophy in the history of the club.

== Qualified teams ==
| Team | Qualification | Previous final app. |
|---|---|---|
| (Uruguay) Rampla Juniors | 1927 Primera División champions | (none) |
| (Argentina) San Lorenzo | 1927 Primera División champions | (none) |

- **Bold** indicates winning years

== Venue ==
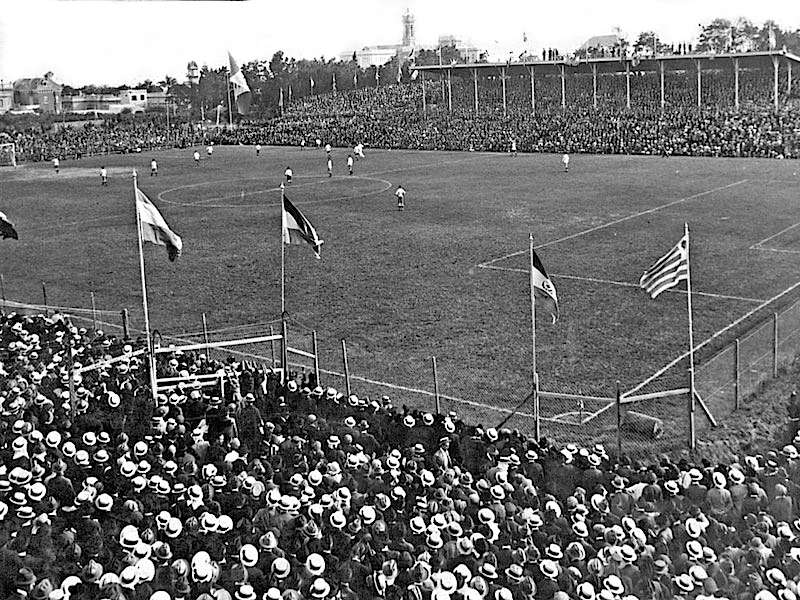
Parque Central Stadium, venue of the final

The match was held in Estadio Gran Parque Central, owned by Club Nacional de Football, located in Montevideo.

The stadium had been opened for the practice of sports on May 25, 1900, with a match between Deutscher Fussball Klub and CURCC, won by CURCC 2–0. Nacional played their first match there two days later, also facing Deutscher FK

The venue was also used as bullring from 1939 to 1941, when the activity was abolished.

In 1911, the stadium was expanded, adding two grandstands (one of them with a roof) to increase its capacity to 15,000. Five years later, Gran Parque Central was expanded again.

Many parts of the stadium remain unchanged since 1900, like the old "Mirador" located behind the Tribuna Atilio García stand, although the current pitch is different from that of the beginning of the past century. The current orientation is east-west, opposite to the first one that was north-south, and there was another field in the actual place of the east stands and eastern part of the pitch.

Until 1930, the Parque Central was the main sports venue in Uruguay. It was only with the building of the Estadio Centenario that Nacional's stadium was superseded. In 1937, Nacional acquired the stadium for $140,000.

== Match details ==
Some moments of the match
1927 Copa Aldao
30 December 1928

| Rampla Juniors (Uruguay) | 0–1 | (Argentina) San Lorenzo |
|---|---|---|
| | Report | Maglio 75' |

Estadio Gran Parque Central , Montevideo
Referee: Domingo Lombardi (Uruguay)

| **Rampla Juniors** | **San Lorenzo** |

| GK | (Uruguay) Enrique Ballesteros |
| DF | (Uruguay) Pedro Aguirre |
| DF | (Uruguay) Pedro Arispe |
| MF | (Uruguay) Julio Nieto |
| MF | (Uruguay) Pascual Cabrera |
| MF | (Uruguay) José Magallanes |
| FW | (Uruguay) Juan Manuel Labraga |
| FW | (Uruguay) Luis Gaitán |
| FW | (Uruguay) Conrado Häberli |
| FW | (Uruguay) Vital Ruffati |
| FW | (Uruguay) Conrado Bidegain |

| GK | (Argentina) Jaime Lema |
| DF | (Argentina) Juan D'Alessandro |
| DF | (Argentina) José Fossa |
| MF | (Argentina) Francisco Corsetti |
| MF | (Argentina) Alfonso Lujambio |
| MF | (Argentina) Salvador Gagliano |
| FW | (Argentina) Alfredo Carricaberry |
| FW | (Argentina) Antonio Picallo |
| FW | (Argentina) Juan Maglio |
| FW | (Argentina) Diego García |
| FW | (Argentina) Arturo Arrieta |
