= Copa Campeonato del Río de la Plata =

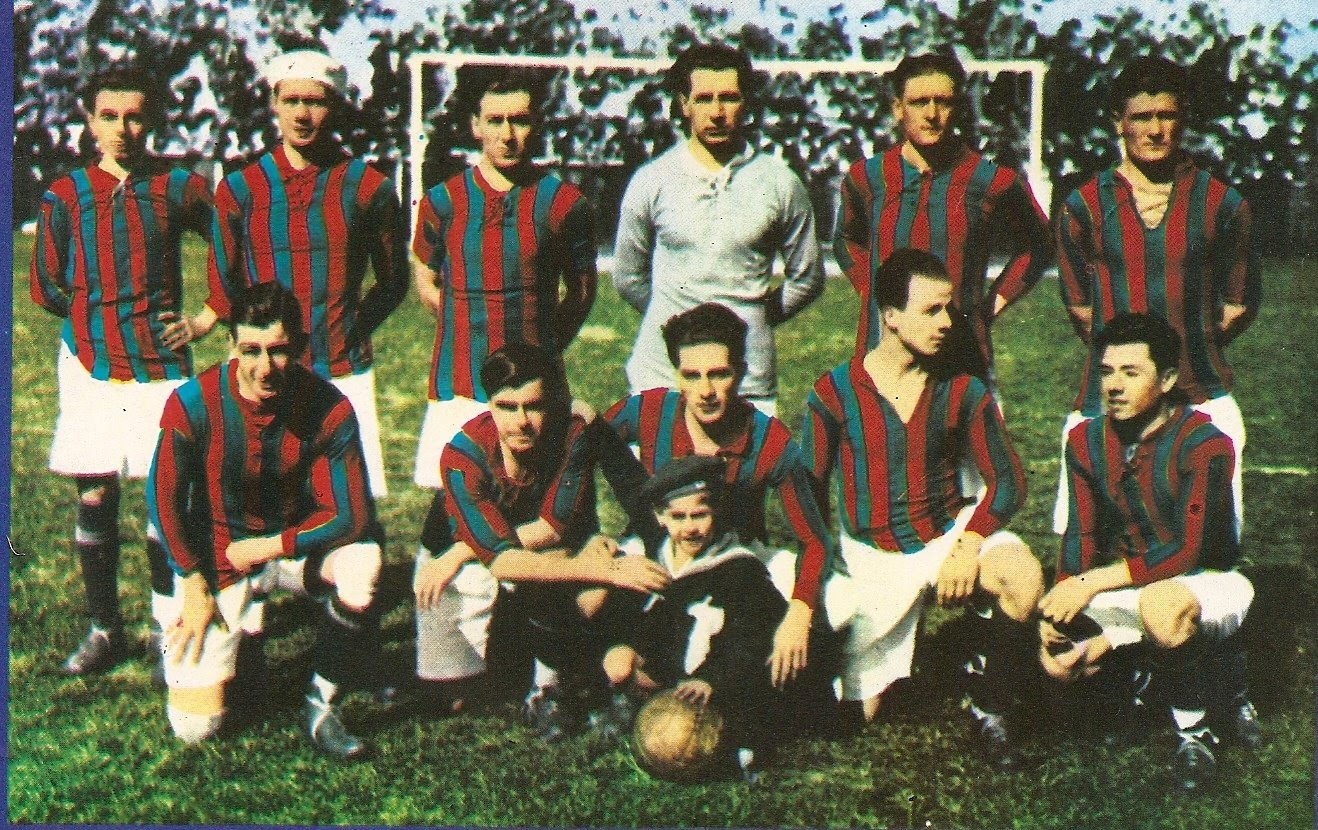
- A San Lorenzo team of 1923
- Organiser(s): (Argentina) AAmF (Uruguay) FUF
- Founded: 1923
- Abolished: 1924; 102 years ago
- Region: Argentina; Uruguay
- Teams: 2
- Related competitions: Copa Aldao
- Last champions: (Argentina) San Lorenzo
- Most championships: (Argentina) San Lorenzo (1 title)

The Copa Campeonato del Río de la Plata (English: Río de la Plata Championship Cup) was an official association football club competition. Unlike Copa Aldao (organised by the Argentine and Uruguayan Associations together), this cup was contested by champions of dissident associations, in this case Asociación Amateurs de Football (AAmF) and Federación Uruguaya de Football (FUF).

There was only one edition of this competition, held in 1923 in Buenos Aires. The match was played between Argentine club San Lorenzo de Almagro (Argentine Primera División AAmF champion) and Uruguayan club Montevideo Wanderers (Uruguayan Primera División FUF champion).

In the match, played at Estadio GEBA in Buenos Aires on June 22, 1924, San Lorenzo defeated Wanderers 1–0, winning not only the trophy but their first international title.

== Qualified teams ==
Team	Qualification	Previous app.
(Argentina) San Lorenzo	1923 Primera División (AAmF) champion	(none)
(Uruguay) Wanderers	1923 Primera División (FUF) champion	(none)

== Match details ==
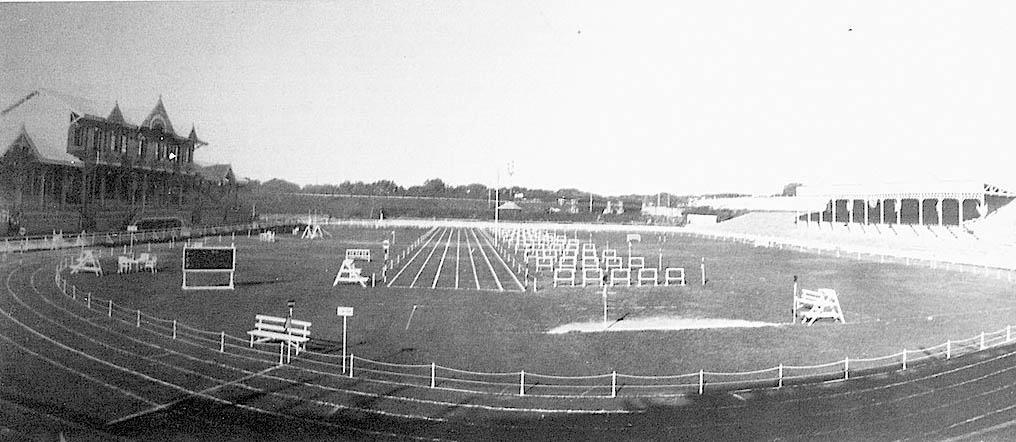
Estadio GEBA, venue for the match

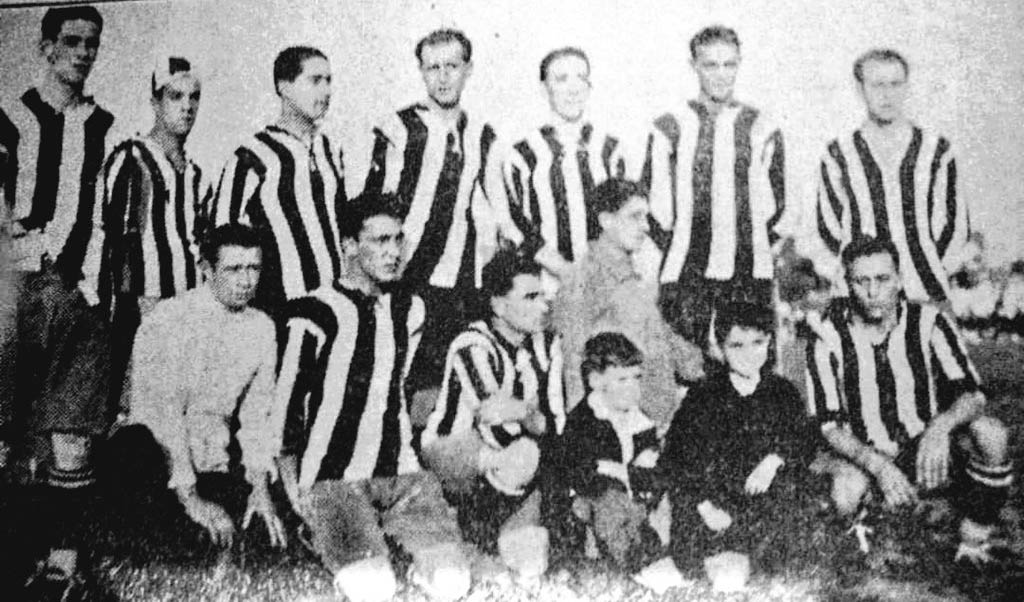
A team of Wanderers of 1923

1923 Copa Río de la Plata
22 June 1924

San Lorenzo (Argentina)	1–0	(Uruguay) Wanderers
Carricaberry 64'	Report

Estadio GEBA, Buenos Aires
Referee: Mangler (Uruguay)

San Lorenzo	Wanderers

GK	(Argentina) Domingo Caldano
DF	(Argentina) Pedro Omar
DF	(Argentina) Enrique Monti
MF	(Argentina) Alfredo Sánchez
MF	(Argentina) Luis Monti
MF	(Argentina) José Fossa
FW	(Argentina) Alfredo Carricaberry
FW	(Argentina) Lindolfo Acosta
FW	(Argentina) Juan Maglio
FW	(Argentina) Antonio Valenti
FW	(Argentina) José L. Danielli

GK	(Uruguay) Miguel Cappuccini
DF	(Uruguay) F. Florio
DF	(Uruguay) Domingo Tejera
MF	(Uruguay) Mauro Méndez
MF	(Uruguay) Francisco Frioni
MF	(Uruguay) Lombardo
FW	(Uruguay) Lorenzo Fernández
FW	(Uruguay) Emilio Sozzo
FW	(Uruguay) René Borjas
FW	(Uruguay) Norberto Casanello
FW	(Uruguay) Nicolás Conti
