= 1909 Campeonato Uruguayo Primera División =

9th season of the top-tier football league in Uruguay

Uruguayan Primera División
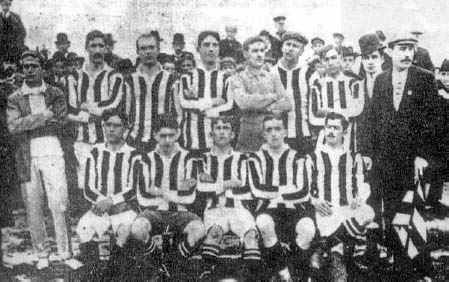
- Montevideo Wanderers, champions
- Season: 1909 (9th)
- Champions: Montevideo Wanderers
- Matches: 110
- Goals: 343 (3.12 per match)

The Uruguayan Championship 1909 was the ninth official championship of Uruguayan football history.

== Overview ==
The tournament consisted of a two-wheel championship of all against all. It involved eleven teams, and the champion was Montevideo Wanderers.

== Teams ==
Team	City	Stadium	Capacity	Foundation	Seasons	Consecutive seasons	Titles	1908
Bristol	Montevideo				1	1	-	5th
CURCC	Montevideo			28 September 1891	8	8	4	7th
Central	Montevideo			5 January 1905	-	-	-	-
Colón	Montevideo			1907	-	-	-	-
Dublin	Montevideo				1	1	-	4th
French	Montevideo				1	1	-	9th
Montevideo	Montevideo			1896	8	8	-	8th
Nacional	Montevideo	Gran Parque Central	7,000	14 May 1899	7	7	2	3rd
Oriental	Montevideo				-	-	-	-
River Plate	Montevideo			1897	2	2	1	1st
Montevideo Wanderers	Montevideo			15 August 1902	5	5	1	2nd

== League standings ==
Pos	Team	Pld	W	D	L	GF	GA	GD	Pts
1	Montevideo Wanderers	20	17	1	2	46	10	+36	35
2	CURCC	20	15	4	1	34	16	+18	34
3	River Plate F.C.	20	15	2	3	44	18	+26	32
4	Nacional	20	14	1	5	42	18	+24	29
5	Dublin	20	10	3	7	40	33	+7	23
6	Central	20	7	2	11	24	31	−7	16
7	Bristol	20	5	5	10	28	40	−12	15
8	Colón	20	5	3	12	27	37	−10	13
9	Montevideo	20	3	5	12	22	39	−17	11
10	French	20	3	2	15	18	55	−37	8
11	Oriental	20	1	2	17	18	46	−28	4

Source: rsssf.com

Promoted for next season: Libertad.

Uruguayan Champion 1909
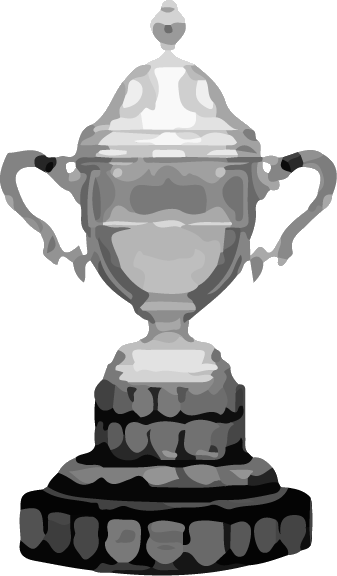
Montevideo Wanderers
2nd title
