= Uruguayan Divisional Intermedia =

Divisional Intermedia
- Organising body: AUF
- Founded: 1915
- Folded: 1942; 84 years ago
- Country: Uruguay
- Confederation: CONMEBOL
- Level on pyramid: 2 (1915–41); 3 (1942–71)
- Promotion to: Primera División (1915–41); Segunda División (1942–71)
- Relegation to: Divisional Extra (1915–71)
- Last champions: Cerro (1941)
- Most championships: Colón; Mar de Fondo; Progreso; Uruguay Montevideo (4 titles each)

Divisional Intermedia was an Uruguayan football league, established in 1915 as the second division of the country's league system to replace Segunda División (folded the previous year). Running from 1915 to 1971, Intermedia was the second division from 1915 to 1941, and then became the third level when professional Uruguayan Segunda División was established in 1942.

The most winning teams of the division were Colón, Mar de Fondo, Progreso, and Uruguay Montevideo with 4 titles each.

== History ==
The first second division established in Uruguay, the Segunda División had been held since 1903, although it was contested irregularly. When it folded in 1915, the "Divisional Intermedia" replaced it as the second division. Unlike its predecessor, Intermedia was linked to the Primera División, with champions promoting to that division in a promotion and relegation regular system between both leagues.

In 1932, football became professional in Uruguay so Primera División and Intermedia (which still remained amateur) lost their connection. Nevertheless, in 1937, when some lower division clubs acceded to professionalism, a playoff match was played between team placed last in Primera and the champion of Intermedia to decide what clubs would be promoted and/or relegated. This system lasted until 1942, when a professional Uruguayan Segunda División was created and the traditional promotion and relegation system was reinstated.

Divisional Intermedia lasted until 1971 when it was merged with "Divisional Extra" to form "Primera C" (currently, Segunda División Amateur), the third division on pyramid.

== List of champions ==
Complete list of champions, with missing information of runner ups and 3rd. positions of each season. From 1942–71, Intermedia was the 3rd. division of Uruguay.

Ed.	Season	Champion
1	1915	Dublín
2	1916	Charley
3	1917	Misiones F.C. (Note: In 1980, Misiones Football Club and Club Sportivo Miramar merged to form current club Miramar Misiones.)
4	1918	Belgrano
5	1919	Liverpool
6	1920	Lito
7	1921	Rampla Juniors
8	1922	Bella Vista
9	1923	Racing
10	1924	Capurro
–	1925	(not completed)
–	1926	(no tournament)
11	1927	Colón
12	1928	Central
13	1929	Racing
–	1930	(no tournament)
14	1931	Colón
–	1932–1935	The Liga Uruguaya de Football Amateur was played.
15	1936	Liverpool
16	1937	Liverpool
17	1938	Progreso
18	1939	Progreso
19	1940	Cerro
20	1941	Cerro
21	1942	Fénix
22	1943	Danubio
23	1944	Olivol
24	1945	Bahía
25	1946	Canillitas
26	1947	Artigas
–	1948	(not completed)
27	1949	Fénix
28	1950	Uruguay Montevideo
29	1951	Cerrito
30	1952	Mar de Fondo
31	1953	Canillitas
32	1954	Colón
33	1955	Uruguay Montevideo
34	1956	Progreso
35	1957	Uruguay Montevideo
36	1958	Mar de Fondo
37	1959	Bella Vista
38	1960	Huracán Buceo
39	1961	Mar de Fondo
40	1962	La Luz
41	1963	Progreso
42	1964	Platense
43	1965	Uruguay Montevideo
44	1966	Rentistas
45	1967	Huracán Buceo
46	1968	Alto Perú
47	1969	Mar de Fondo
48	1970	Cerrito
49	1971	Misiones F.C.

== Titles by club ==
Club	Titles	Winning years
Progreso	4	1938, 1939, 1956, 1963
Uruguay Montevideo	4	1950, 1955, 1957, 1965
Mar de Fondo	4	1952, 1958, 1961, 1969
Colón	3	1927, 1931, 1954
Racing	2	1923, 1929
Misiones	2	1917, 1971
Liverpool	2	1919, 1937
Bella Vista	2	1922, 1959
Cerro	2	1940, 1941
Fénix	2	1942, 1949
Canillitas	2	1946, 1953
Cerrito	2	1951, 1970
Huracán Buceo	2	1960, 1967

== See also ==
- Uruguayan Segunda División (1903-1914)
- Uruguayan Segunda División
