= 1927 Campeonato Uruguayo Primera División =

25th season of the top-tier football league in Uruguay

Uruguayan Primera División
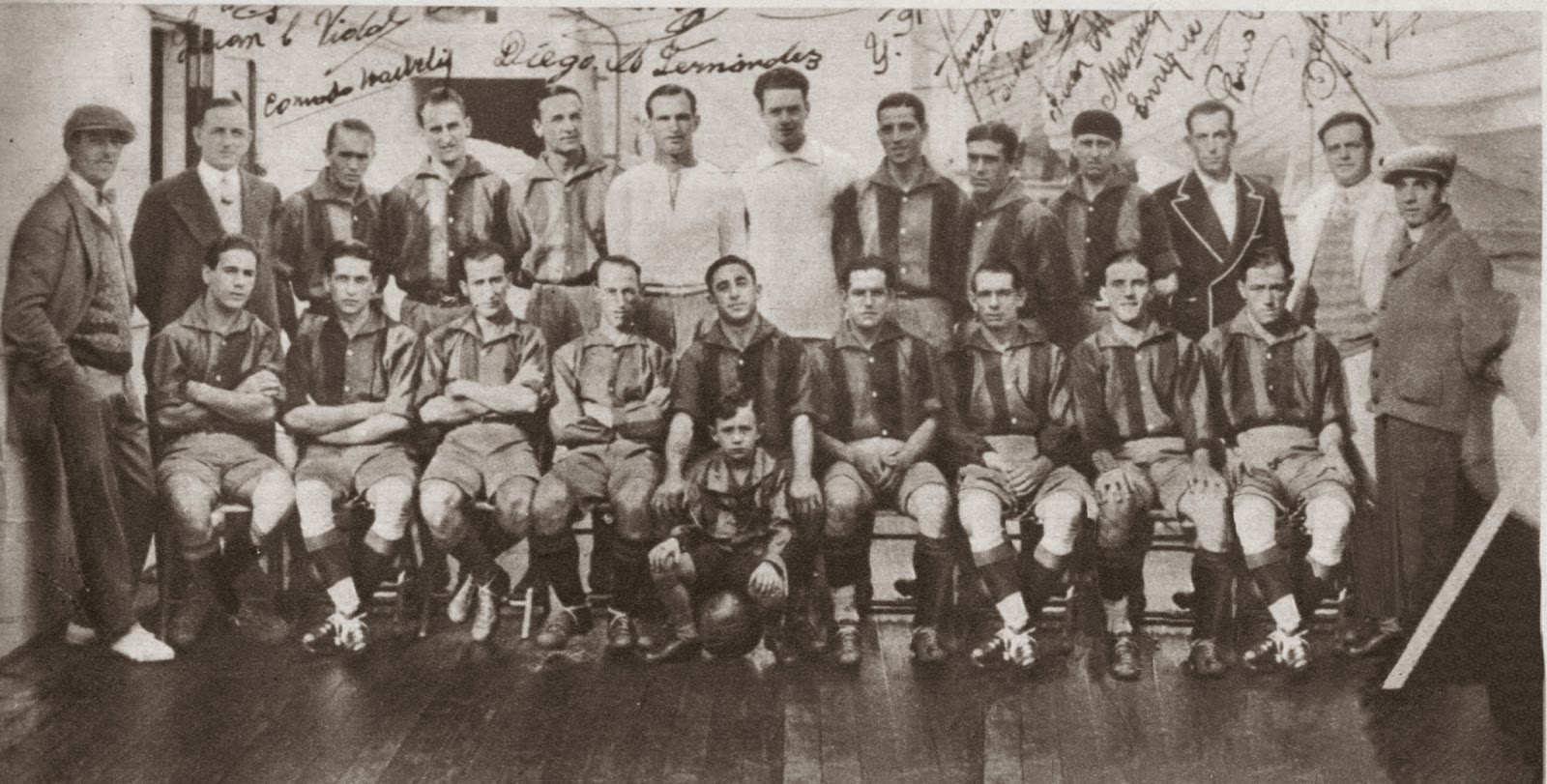
- Rampla Juniors, champions
- Season: 1927 (25th)
- Champions: Rampla Juniors
- Relegated: Central; Solferino; Rosarino Central; Belgrano; Universal
- 1927 Copa Aldao: Rampla Juniors
- Matches: 132
- Goals: 279 (2.11 per match)

The Uruguayan Championship 1927 was the 25th season of Uruguay's top-flight professional football league.

== Overview ==
After two years without an official tournament (1925 and 1926), the 1927 tournament reunited the two associations that divided the Uruguayan football after the schism of 1922. It consisted of a two-wheel championship of all against all. It was attended by 20 teams, with the tournament with the most participants in history. The winner was Rampla Juniors, crowned Uruguayan champion for the first and only time in their history.

== Teams ==
Team	City	Stadium	Capacity	Foundation	Seasons	Consecutive seasons	Titles	1924
Belgrano	Montevideo	Parque Erba		1908	6	6	-	8th
Bella Vista	Montevideo	Parque Olivos		4 October 1920	2	2	-	2nd
Capurro	Montevideo	Parque Narancio		31 October 1914	-	-	-	-
Central	Montevideo	Parque Fraternidad		5 January 1905	14	-	-	-
Cerro	Montevideo	Parque Santa Rosa		1 December 1922	-	-	-	-
Defensor	Montevideo	Parque Ricci		15 March 1913	-	-	-	-
Lito	Montevideo			1917	4	4	-	9th
Liverpool	Montevideo			15 February 1915	5	5	-	10th
Misiones	Montevideo	Parque Chaná		26 May 1906	1	-	-	-
Nacional	Montevideo	Gran Parque Central	15,000	14 May 1899	23	23	11	1st
Olimpia	Montevideo	Olimpia Park		13 March 1922	-	-	-	-
Peñarol	Montevideo	Estadio Pocitos	1,000	28 September 1891	22	-	7	-
Racing	Montevideo			6 April 1919	1	1	-	5th
Rampla Juniors	Montevideo	Parque Nelson		7 January 1914	3	3	-	3rd
Rosarino Central	Montevideo				-	-	-	-
Solferino	Montevideo				-	-	-	-
Sud América	Montevideo	Parque Higiene y Salud		15 February 1914	-	-	-	-
Universal	Montevideo	Parque Salvo			13	13	-	11th
Uruguay Onward	Montevideo				5	5	-	7th
Montevideo Wanderers	Montevideo	Estadio Belvedere		15 August 1902	21	21	2	6th

== League standings ==
Pos	Team	Pld	W	D	L	GF	GA	GD	Pts
1	Rampla Juniors	38	25	7	6	63	19	+44	57
2	Peñarol	38	22	10	6	63	33	+30	54
3	Nacional	38	20	9	9	58	37	+21	49
4	Montevideo Wanderers	38	21	6	11	66	36	+30	48
5	Sud América	38	16	13	9	48	32	+16	45
6	Defensor	38	16	11	11	58	40	+18	43
7	Misiones	38	18	6	14	51	38	+13	42
8	Olimpia	38	15	11	12	50	51	−1	41
9	Lito	38	15	10	13	53	46	+7	40
10	Bella Vista	38	15	10	13	47	38	+9	40
11	Uruguay Onward	38	13	13	12	39	45	−6	39
12	Capurro	38	14	9	15	54	53	+1	37
13	Cerro	38	14	9	15	47	56	−9	37
14	Liverpool	38	13	10	15	37	53	−16	36
15	Racing	38	14	8	16	48	62	−14	36
16	Central	38	10	14	14	43	46	−3	34
17	Solferino	38	10	10	18	43	60	−17	30
18	Rosarino Central	38	8	8	22	27	50	−23	24
19	Belgrano	38	7	4	27	17	63	−46	18
20	Universal	38	2	6	30	24	78	−54	10

Source: rsssf.com

Uruguayan Champion 1927
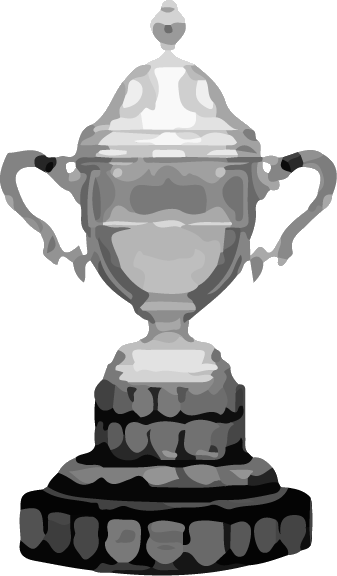
Rampla Juniors
1st title
