= 1914 Campeonato Uruguayo Primera División =

14th season of the top-tier football league in Uruguay

Uruguayan Primera División
- Season: 1914 (14th)
- Champions: River Plate F.C.
- Matches: 56
- Goals: 121 (2.16 per match)

The Uruguayan Championship 1914 was the 14th season of Uruguay's top-flight football league.

== Overview ==
The tournament consisted of a two-wheel championship of all against all. It involved eight teams, and the champion was River Plate F.C. which won its second consecutive title and fourth championship in just seven years. It was also the last tournament for this team before its ultimate demise.

Before starting the sporting year, the C.U.R.C.C. announced a name change to Club Atlético Peñarol, which sparked controversy many years later. Another club (Nacional) denounced that as two different clubs, claiming that this was a manoeuvre for the new club Peñarol, allowing them to enter the First Division without having to go through the divisions of ascent.

== Teams ==
Team	City	Stadium	Capacity	Foundation	Seasons	Consecutive seasons	Titles	1913
Central	Montevideo			5 January 1905	5	5	-	4th
Independencia	Montevideo				-	-	-	-
Nacional	Montevideo	Gran Parque Central	15,000	14 May 1899	12	12	3	2nd
Peñarol	Montevideo			28 September 1891 (Note: Controversy exists on the date of the founding of C.A. Peñarol. The club's official position assumes a change of name of CURCC (founded on December 28, 1891). On the other hand, some historians state that "C.A. Peñarol" was established on December 13, 1913.)	13	13	5	3rd
Reformers	Montevideo				1	1	-	6th
River Plate	Montevideo			1897	7	7	3	1st
Universal	Montevideo				2	2	-	7th
Montevideo Wanderers	Montevideo			15 August 1902	10	10	2	5th

== League standings ==
Pos	Team	Pld	W	D	L	GF	GA	GD	Pts
1	River Plate F.C.	14	9	4	1	21	8	+13	22
1	Peñarol	14	9	4	1	22	8	+14	22
3	Nacional	14	8	5	1	26	11	+15	21
4	Universal	14	6	2	6	27	24	+3	14
5	Montevideo Wanderers	14	5	2	7	19	20	−1	12
6	Reformers	14	4	2	8	16	29	−13	10
7	Central	14	3	3	8	11	19	−8	9
8	Independencia	14	0	2	12	8	31	−23	2

Source: rsssf.com

First Final: River Plate F.C. 1-1 Peñarol

Second Final: River Plate F.C. 1-1 Peñarol

Third Final: River Plate F.C. 1-0 Peñarol

Uruguayan Champion 1914
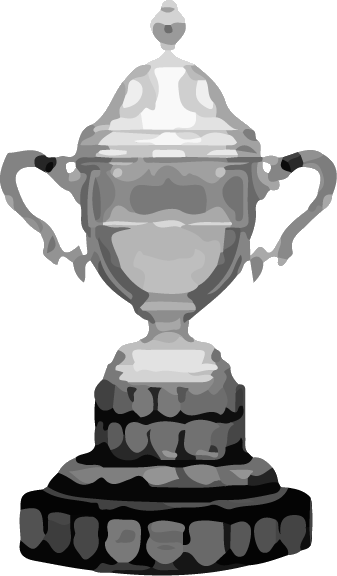

4th title
