= Mar de Fondo Fútbol Club =

Uruguayan football club

Mar de Fondo
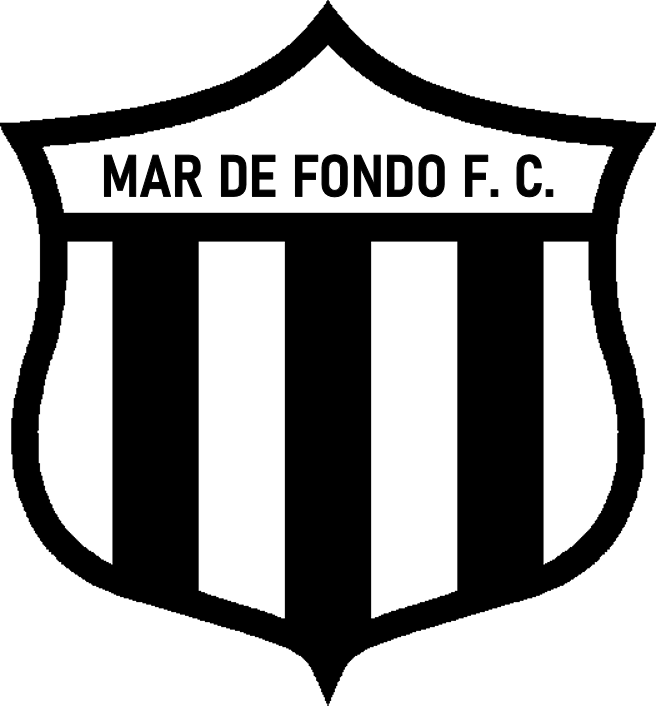
- Full name: Mar de Fondo Fútbol Club
- Nicknames: Marde, Albinegro, Palermitano
- Founded: August 25, 1934
- Chairman: Walter Telechea
- Manager: Andrés Matosas
- League: Segunda División Amateur
- Website: http://www.mardefondofc.uy/
Home colours	Away colours

Mar de Fondo Fútbol Club is a football club from Montevideo, Uruguay. They currently play in the Second Amateur Division, the third and last tier of the Uruguayan championship.

== Titles ==
- Divisional Intermedia (4): 1952, 1958, 1961, 1969
- Divisional Extra (1): 1951
