= 1908 Campeonato Uruguayo Primera División =

8th season of the top-tier football league in Uruguay

Uruguayan Primera División
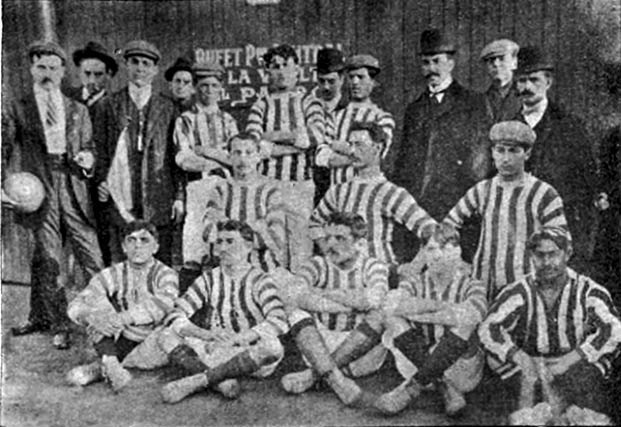
- River Plate, champions
- Season: 1908 (8th)
- Champions: River Plate
- Relegated: Intrépido
- Matches: 89
- Goals: 259 (2.91 per match)

The Uruguayan Championship 1908 was the eighth official championship of Uruguayan football history.

== Overview ==
The tournament consisted of a two-wheel championship of all against all. It involved ten teams, and the champion was River Plate F.C. for the first time in history. The tournament featured several defections during the course of it.

== Teams ==
| Team | City | Stadium | Capacity | Foundation | Seasons | Consecutive seasons | Titles | 1907 |
|---|---|---|---|---|---|---|---|---|
| Albion | Montevideo | | | 1 June 1891 | 5 | - | - | - |
| Bristol | Montevideo | | | | - | - | - | - |
| CURCC | Montevideo | | | 28 September 1891 | 7 | 7 | 4 | 1st |
| Dublin | Montevideo | | | | - | - | - | - |
| French | Montevideo | | | | - | - | - | - |
| Intrépido | Montevideo | | | | 2 | 2 | - | 6th |
| Montevideo | Montevideo | | | 1896 | 7 | 7 | - | 5th |
| Nacional | Montevideo | Gran Parque Central | 7,000 | 14 May 1899 | 6 | 6 | 2 | 4th |
| River Plate | Montevideo | | | 1897 | 1 | 1 | - | 3rd |
| Montevideo Wanderers | Montevideo | | | 15 August 1902 | 4 | 4 | 1 | 2nd |

== League standings ==
| Pos | Team | Pld | W | D | L | GF | GA | GD | Pts |
|---|---|---|---|---|---|---|---|---|---|
| 1 | River Plate F.C. | 18 | 15 | 1 | 2 | 42 | 13 | +29 | 31 |
| 2 | Montevideo Wanderers | 18 | 12 | 0 | 6 | 38 | 12 | +26 | 24 |
| 3 | Nacional | 17 | 11 | 2 | 4 | 34 | 16 | +18 | 24 |
| 4 | Dublin | 18 | 11 | 2 | 5 | 32 | 13 | +19 | 24 |
| 5 | Bristol | 18 | 8 | 1 | 9 | 33 | 25 | +8 | 17 |
| 6 | Albion | 18 | 7 | 3 | 8 | 18 | 36 | −18 | 17 |
| 7 | CURCC | 17 | 7 | 2 | 8 | 6 | 20 | −14 | 16 |
| 8 | Montevideo | 18 | 8 | 0 | 10 | 17 | 37 | −20 | 16 |
| 9 | French | 18 | 4 | 1 | 13 | 20 | 59 | −39 | 9 |
| 10 | Intrépido | 18 | 0 | 0 | 18 | 5 | 42 | −37 | 0 |

Source: rsssf.com
- C.U.R.C.C. left the competition after the tenth match.
- Nacional left the competition after the fourteenth match.
- Intrépido was reversed after failing to attend four of their first 13 games.
- The match C.U.R.C.C. - Nacional was not contested.
- Promoted for next season: Colón and Oriental.

Uruguayan Champion 1908
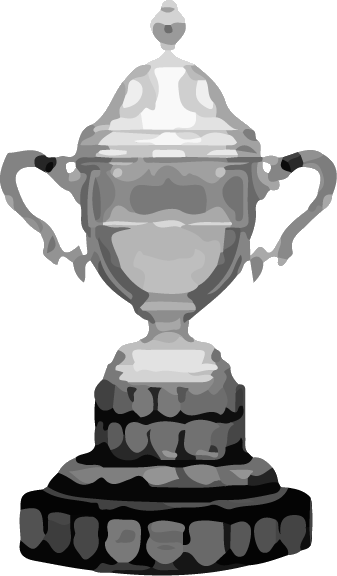
River Plate F.C.
1st title
