= 1913 Campeonato Uruguayo Primera División =

13th season of the top-tier football league in Uruguay

Uruguayan Primera División
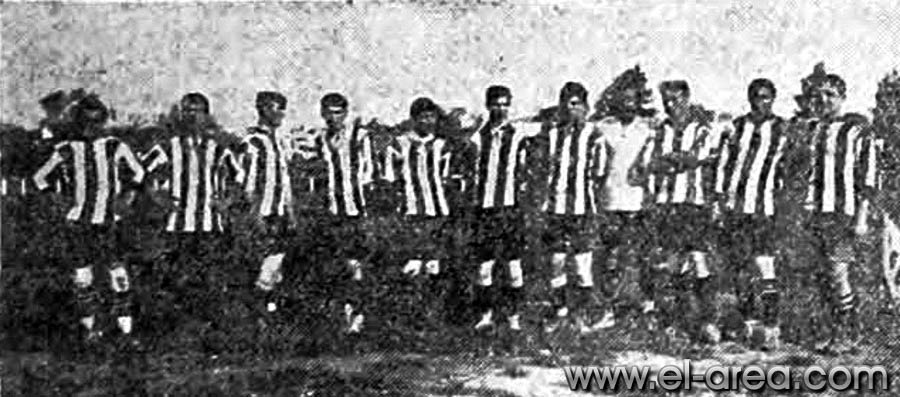
- River Plate, champions
- Season: 1913 (13th)
- Champions: River Plate
- Relegated: Bristol
- Matches: 56
- Goals: 121 (2.16 per match)

The Uruguayan Championship 1913 was the 13th season of Uruguay's top-flight football league.

== Overview ==
The tournament consisted of a two-wheel championship of all against all. It involved eight teams, and the champion was River Plate F.C.

== Teams ==
Team	City	Stadium	Capacity	Foundation	Seasons	Consecutive seasons	Titles	1912
Bristol	Montevideo				5	5	-	5th
CURCC / Peñarol (Note: Controversy exists on the date of the founding of C.A. Peñarol. The club's official position assumes a change of name of CURCC (founded on December 28, 1891). On the other hand, some historians state that "C.A. Peñarol" was established on December 13, 1913.)	Montevideo			28 September 1891	12	12	5	2nd
Central	Montevideo			5 January 1905	4	4	-	6th
Nacional	Montevideo	Gran Parque Central	15,000	14 May 1899	11	11	3	1st
Reformers	Montevideo				-	-	-	-
River Plate	Montevideo			1897	6	6	2	4th
Universal	Montevideo				1	1	-	7th
Montevideo Wanderers	Montevideo			15 August 1902	9	9	2	3rd

== League standings ==
Pos	Team	Pld	W	D	L	GF	GA	GD	Pts
1	River Plate	14	9	4	1	20	9	+11	22
2	Nacional	14	7	6	1	25	9	+16	20
3	CURCC / Peñarol	14	5	4	5	20	16	+4	14
4	Central	14	6	2	6	12	14	−2	14
5	Montevideo Wanderers	14	6	1	7	13	16	−3	13
6	Reformers	14	4	2	8	8	20	−12	10
7	Universal	14	3	4	7	10	17	−7	10
8	Bristol	14	2	5	7	13	20	−7	9

Source: rsssf.com

Uruguayan Champion 1913
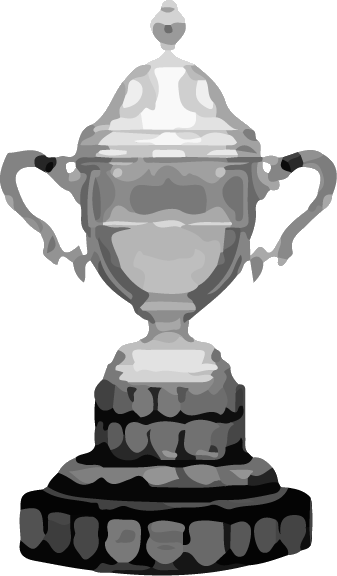
River Plate F.C.
3rd title
