= 1923 Campeonato Uruguayo Primera División =

23rd season of the top-tier football league in Uruguay

Primera División
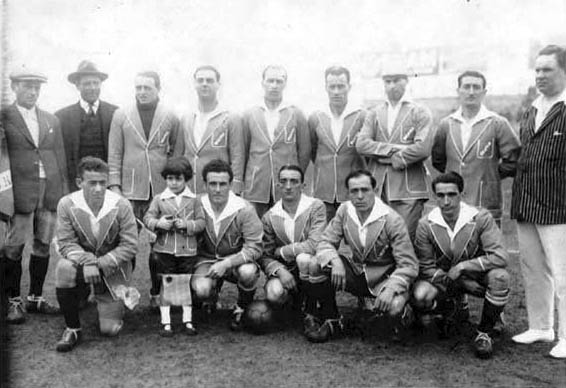
- Nacional, champions
- Season: 1923
- Champions: Nacional (14th title)
- Relegated: Dublin
- Matches: 132
- Goals: 269 (2.04 per match)

The 1923 Primera División was the 23rd season of top-flight football in Uruguay. This was organised by official body, Uruguayan Football Association (AUF), while dissident body, Uruguayan Football Federation (FUF), organised its own championship simultaneously.

== Overview ==
The tournament consisted of a round-robin. It involved twelve teams, and the champion was Nacional.

This year was the first fractured Uruguayan football championship, due to the schism that triggered the emergence of a parallel Uruguayan Football Federation organizing their own championship. However, the league recognized by FIFA and CONMEBOL remained the Uruguayan Football Association (AUF), which achieved the same for the fourth time to get South American Championship selections with their representative, qualifying for the Paris Olympic Games the following year.

Disenrollment of AUF clubs Peñarol and Central the previous year, produced the first appearance of clubs Bella Vista and Fénix in the first division. In turn, Montevideo Wanderers, Charley and Lito participated in both tournaments with two different teams. Lito were dubbed "round" in the AUF and Lito "square" in the FUF, differing by the shield they carried on a Barca shirt. The Wanderers used their official name in the AUF, registering with an alternate team under the name of "Athletic Wanderers" in the FUF.

== Teams ==
Team	City	Stadium	Capacity	Foundation	Seasons	Consecutive seasons	Titles	1922
Belgrano	Montevideo				4	4	-	6th
Bella Vista	Montevideo			4 October 1920	-	-	-	-
Charley	Montevideo				6	6	-	11th
Dublin	Montevideo				12	7	-	12th
Fénix	Montevideo			7 July 1916	-	-	-	-
Lito	Montevideo			1917	2	2	-	5th
Liverpool	Montevideo			15 February 1915	3	3	-	7th
Nacional	Montevideo	Gran Parque Central	15,000	14 May 1899	21	21	9	1st
Rampla Juniors	Montevideo			7 January 1914	1	1	-	3rd
Universal	Montevideo				11	11	-	8th
Uruguay Onward	Montevideo				3	3	-	10th
Montevideo Wanderers	Montevideo			15 August 1902	19	19	2	2nd

== League standings ==
Pos	Team	Pld	W	D	L	GF	GA	GD	Pts
1	Nacional	22	18	2	2	58	12	+46	38
2	Rampla Juniors	22	14	6	2	30	12	+18	34
3	Bella Vista	22	13	4	5	35	16	+19	30
4	Belgrano	22	10	5	7	20	20	0	25
5	Lito	22	8	8	6	23	21	+2	24
6	Universal	22	9	4	9	19	24	−5	22
7	Liverpool	22	6	8	8	17	22	−5	20
8	Fénix	22	5	8	9	13	20	−7	18
9	Montevideo Wanderers	22	5	6	11	16	24	−8	16
10	Uruguay Onward	22	3	9	10	16	27	−11	15
11	Charley	22	4	5	13	16	38	−22	13
12	Dublin	22	3	3	16	6	33	−27	9

Source: rsssf.com

1924 Primera División Champion
Nacional
10th title

== See also ==
- 1923 Uruguayan Primera División of FUF
