= Uruguayan Segunda División (1903–1914) =

- Organising body: AUF
- Founded: 1903
- Folded: 1914; 112 years ago
- Country: Uruguay
- Level on pyramid: 2 (1903–1914)
- Promotion to: (none)
- Most championships: River Plate (3)

The Uruguayan Segunda División was a football league in Uruguay, organised by the AUF. First held in 1903, this competition was one of the divisions that formed the Uruguayan football league system, and was contested until 1914 when it was replaced by Divisional Intermedia.

Divisional Intermedia was the second division of Uruguay until 1942, when the Segunda División Profesional was created as a professional football league, therefore Intermedia became the third division.

There are few records of Segunda División and almost nothing about results or further data of each season. Moreover, on some occasions Segunda División champions were not allowed by the AUF to participate in Primera División. One of those teams was River Plate, that was allowed to participate in Primera only after having won the Segunda División three times. Therefore River Plate played its first Primera División tournament in Primera División 1907.

River Plate remains as the most winning team of Segunda División with 3 titles.

== List of champions ==
The following list include all champions:

Ed.	Season	Champion
1	1903	River Plate (1)
–	1904	(not held) (Note: No tournaments were held that year because of the Uruguayan Civil War.)
2	1905	River Plate (2)
3	1906	River Plate (3)
4	1907	Bristol (1)
5	1908	Central (1)
6	1909	CURCC B (Note: Reserve team so the senior squad was competing in Primera División.)(1)
7	1910	Nacional B(1)
8	1911	Universal (1)
9	1912	Reformers (1)
10	1913	Independencia (1)
11	1914	Defensor (1)
