= 1903 Campeonato Uruguayo Primera División =

4th season of the top-tier football league in Uruguay

Primera División
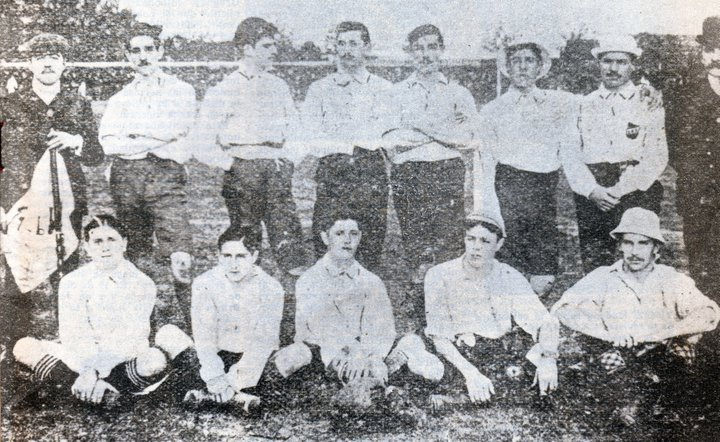
- Nacional, champions
- Season: 1903 (4th)
- Champions: Nacional (2º title)
- Matches: 39
- Goals: 148 (3.79 per match)
- Top goalscorer: Juan Pena (16) (CURCC)

The 1903 Primera División was the 4th. season of top-flight football in Uruguay. Nacional won its second title after beating CURCC at a final match due to both teams had finished in the first position.

== Overview ==
The tournament consisted of a round-robin championship. It involved seven teams, and the champion was Club Nacional de Football. This would be their second national conquest and the second consecutively.

With respect to the previous edition, the tournament featured the incorporation of Montevideo Wanderers. There was no promotion or relegation for the following season.

== Teams ==
Team	City	Stadium	Capacity	Foundation	Seasons	Consecutive seasons	Titles	1902
Albion	Montevideo			1 June 1891	3	3	-	5th
CURCC	Montevideo			28 September 1891	3	3	2	2nd
Deutscher	Montevideo			1896	3	3	-	3rd
Nacional	Montevideo	Gran Parque Central	7,000	14 May 1899	2	2	1	1st
Triunfo	Montevideo				1	1	-	6th
Uruguay Athletic	Montevideo			10 August 1898	3	3	-	4th
Montevideo Wanderers	Montevideo			15 August 1902	-	-	-	-

== League standings ==
Pos	Team	Pld	W	D	L	GF	GA	GD	Pts
1	CURCC	12	10	2	0	52	3	+49	22
1	Nacional (C)	12	10	2	0	24	1	+23	22
3	Deutscher	12	4	2	6	18	17	+1	10
4	Montevideo Wanderers	11	4	1	6	20	24	−4	9
5	Albion	12	2	3	7	14	37	−23	7
6	Triunfo	11	2	3	6	9	33	−24	7
7	Uruguay Athletic	12	2	1	9	6	28	−22	5

Source: rsssf.com
(C) Champions
- The match Triunfo - Montevideo Wanderers was not contested.

=== Final playoff ===
29 August 1904

Nacional	3–2	CURCC
Bolívar Céspedes; Carlos Céspedes	Source	Camacho; Mañana

Albion F.C. Field

Nacional
CURCC

1903 Primera División Champion

2nd title
