= 1927 Argentine Primera División =

36th season of top-tier football league in Argentina

Primera División
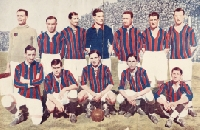
- San Lorenzo, champions
- Season: 1927
- Dates: 19 March 1927 – 12 February 1928
- Champions: San Lorenzo (3rd. title)
- Promoted: Sportivo Barracas
- Relegated: (none)
- 1927 Copa Aldao: San Lorenzo
- Top goalscorer: (Argentina) Domingo Tarasconi (Boca Juniors) (32 goals)

The 1927 Argentine Primera División was the 36th season of top-flight football in Argentina. Thirty-four teams were eligible to play the tournament (8 from official AFA and 26 from dissident AAm). It was also established that the 14 founder members of AAm would not be relegated in case of finishing in the last position. Therefore, the last four teams at the end of the season (Tigre, San Isidro, Estudiantes (BA) and Porteño) remained in Primera.

The season began on March 19, 1927, and ended on April 8, 1928. San Lorenzo won its third league title.

== Final table ==
Pos	Team	Pld	W	D	L	GF	GA	GD	Pts
1	San Lorenzo	33	26	5	2	86	26	+60	57
2	Boca Juniors	33	25	6	2	79	22	+57	56
3	Lanús	33	22	6	5	52	25	+27	50
4	Ferro Carril Oeste	33	19	9	5	58	36	+22	47
5	Huracán	33	18	8	7	58	28	+30	44
6	Independiente	33	20	4	9	65	39	+26	44
7	Racing	33	18	5	10	66	42	+24	41
8	Sportivo Palermo	33	17	7	9	50	34	+16	41
9	Sportivo Barracas	33	17	7	9	56	39	+17	41
10	River Plate	33	17	6	10	53	35	+18	40
11	Estudiantes (LP)	33	15	10	8	69	46	+23	40
12	Quilmes	33	16	7	10	62	48	+14	39
13	Argentino de Quilmes	33	14	8	11	55	45	+10	36
14	Platense	33	14	8	11	40	46	−6	36
15	Chacarita Juniors	33	11	13	9	57	48	+9	35
16	San Fernando	33	12	11	10	55	48	+7	35
17	Banfield	33	13	6	14	45	47	−2	32
18	Argentinos Juniors	33	11	10	12	38	40	−2	32
19	Barracas Central	33	11	9	13	54	56	−2	31
20	Sportivo Buenos Aires	33	13	5	15	46	50	−4	31
21	Almagro	33	11	8	14	38	34	+4	30
22	Liberal Argentino	33	9	9	15	40	47	−7	27
23	Talleres (RE)	33	10	9	14	30	38	−8	27 (Note: 2 points deducted?)
24	Vélez Sarsfield	33	11	5	17	42	62	−20	27
25	Gimnasia y Esgrima (LP)	33	8	9	16	40	57	−17	25
26	Argentino del Sud	33	9	6	18	42	67	−25	24
27	Estudiantil Porteño	33	9	5	19	43	62	−19	23
28	Excursionistas	33	8	6	19	40	69	−29	22
29	Atlanta	33	8	6	19	28	50	−22	22
30	Defensores de Belgrano	33	8	5	20	30	51	−21	21 (Note: There were no relegations in 1927 because the rules stated that the 14 founding members of Asociación Amateurs were exempt to be relegated in case of finishing last during their first season in the reunified league. That applied to Defensores de Belgrano, Tigre, San Isidro, Estudiantes (BA) and Porteño.)
31	Tigre	33	9	3	21	35	76	−41	21
32	San Isidro	33	6	8	19	39	80	−41	20
33	Estudiantes (BA)	33	5	9	19	22	51	−29	19
34	Porteño	33	1	2	30	24	93	−69	4

Source: Primera División 1927 at Historia y Futbol
