= 1924 Campeonato Uruguayo Primera División =

24th season of the top-tier football league in Uruguay

Primera División
- Season: 1924
- Champions: Nacional (11th title)
- Relegated: Charley
- Matches: 132
- Goals: 267 (2.02 per match)

The 1924 Primera División was the 24th. season of top-flight football in Uruguay. This was organised by official body, Uruguayan Football Association (AUF), while dissident body, Uruguayan Football Federation (FUF), organised its own championship simultaneously.

== Overview ==
The tournament consisted of a round-robin championship. It involved twelve teams, and the champion was Nacional (third consecutively).

== Teams ==
Team	City	Stadium	Capacity	Foundation	Seasons	Consecutive seasons	Titles	1923
Belgrano	Montevideo				5	5	-	4th
Bella Vista	Montevideo			4 October 1920	1	1	-	3rd
Charley	Montevideo				7	7	-	11th
Fénix	Montevideo			7 July 1916	1	1	-	8th
Lito	Montevideo			1917	3	3	-	8th
Liverpool	Montevideo			15 February 1915	4	4	-	7th
Nacional	Montevideo	Gran Parque Central	15,000	14 May 1899	22	22	10	1st
Racing	Montevideo			6 April 1919	-	-	-	-
Rampla Juniors	Montevideo			7 January 1914	2	2	-	2nd
Universal	Montevideo				12	12	-	6th
Uruguay Onward	Montevideo				4	4	-	10th
Montevideo Wanderers	Montevideo			15 August 1902	20	20	2	9th

== League standings ==
Pos	Team	Pld	W	D	L	GF	GA	GD	Pts
1	Nacional	22	17	5	0	49	10	+39	39
2	Bella Vista	22	16	5	1	34	15	+19	37
3	Rampla Juniors	22	11	7	4	28	15	+13	29
4	Fénix	22	10	7	5	30	21	+9	27
5	Racing	22	9	7	6	17	20	−3	25
6	Montevideo Wanderers	22	7	8	7	27	19	+8	22
7	Uruguay Onward	22	6	8	8	18	31	−13	20
8	Belgrano	22	6	7	9	18	19	−1	19
9	Lito	22	6	7	9	18	19	−1	19
10	Liverpool	22	5	5	12	11	25	−14	15
11	Universal	22	3	5	14	11	29	−18	11
12	Charley	22	0	1	21	6	44	−38	1

Source: rsssf.com

1924 Primera División champion

11th title

== See also ==
- 1924 Uruguayan Primera División of FUF
