= 1924 FUF Primera División =

Primera División (FUF)
- Season: 1924
- Champions: Peñarol (1st title)
- Matches: 272
- Goals: 648 (2.38 per match)

The 1924 Primera División championship the second and last tournament organized by the dissident body Uruguayan Football Federation (FUF).

== Overview ==
The tournament consisted of a round-robin tournament. It involved 17 teams, and the champion was Peñarol. This was the last tournament to be played in this federation, having been suspended which would take place the following year. After the dissolution of the Federation, some of the clubs in the FUF returned to the Uruguayan Football Association (AUF) and many others disappeared.

== League standings ==
| Pos | Team | Pld | W | D | L | GF | GA | GD | Pts |
|---|---|---|---|---|---|---|---|---|---|
| 1 | Peñarol | 32 | 25 | 6 | 1 | 80 | 14 | +66 | 56 |
| 2 | Atlético Wanderers | 32 | 21 | 8 | 3 | 46 | 16 | +30 | 50 |
| 3 | Lito Cuadrado | 32 | 16 | 14 | 2 | 49 | 21 | +28 | 46 |
| 4 | Olimpia | 32 | 16 | 7 | 9 | 45 | 34 | +11 | 39 |
| 5 | Defensor | 32 | 12 | 11 | 9 | 50 | 42 | +8 | 35 |
| 6 | Rosarino Central | 32 | 12 | 11 | 9 | 37 | 34 | +3 | 35 |
| 7 | Sud América | 32 | 11 | 10 | 11 | 43 | 39 | +4 | 32 |
| 8 | Central | 32 | 12 | 6 | 14 | 39 | 40 | −1 | 30 |
| 9 | Misiones | 32 | 10 | 9 | 13 | 29 | 27 | +2 | 29 |
| 10 | Peñarol del Plata | 32 | 9 | 10 | 13 | 34 | 45 | −11 | 28 |
| 11 | Solferino | 32 | 9 | 9 | 14 | 34 | 48 | −14 | 27 |
| 12 | Uruguayo | 32 | 7 | 13 | 12 | 27 | 33 | −6 | 27 |
| 13 | Las Piedras | 32 | 9 | 7 | 16 | 28 | 41 | −13 | 25 |
| 14 | Colón | 32 | 7 | 9 | 16 | 28 | 48 | −20 | 23 |
| 15 | Roberto Chery | 32 | 6 | 9 | 17 | 25 | 47 | −22 | 21 |
| 16 | Charley | 32 | 5 | 11 | 16 | 27 | 59 | −32 | 21 |
| 17 | Roland Moor | 32 | 5 | 10 | 17 | 27 | 50 | −23 | 20 |

1924 Primera División (FUF) Champion
Peñarol
1st title

== See also ==
- 1924 Uruguayan Primera División of AUF
