= 1900 Campeonato Uruguayo Primera División =

1st season of the top-tier football league in Uruguay

Primera División
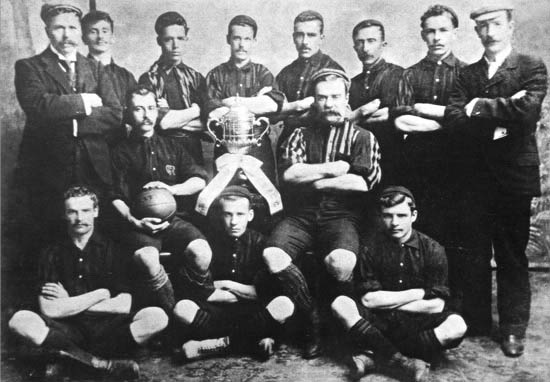
- CURCC, champions
- Season: 1900 (1st)
- Champions: CURCC (1st title)
- Relegated: (None)
- Matches: 12
- Goals: 64 (5.33 per match)
- Top goalscorer: James Buchanan (6) (CURCC)

The 1900 Primera División was the 1st season of top-flight football in Uruguay. It was the first official championship held by the Uruguayan Football Association (AUF).

== Overview ==
The tournament consisted of a round-robin championship. It took only four teams, all founding members of the Uruguayan Football Association, among which would be victorious Central Uruguay Railway Cricket Club.

== Clubs ==
| Club | City | Stadium | Established |
|---|---|---|---|
| Albion | Montevideo | Paso Molino | 1891 |
| CURCC | Montevideo | Villa Peñarol | 1891 |
| Deutscher | Montevideo | Parque Central | 1896 |
| Uruguay A.C. | Montevideo | Punta Carretas | 1898 |

== League standings ==
| Pos | Team | Pld | W | D | L | GF | GA | GD | Pts |
|---|---|---|---|---|---|---|---|---|---|
| 1 | CURCC | 6 | 6 | 0 | 0 | 36 | 2 | +34 | 12 |
| 2 | Albion | 6 | 4 | 0 | 2 | 22 | 6 | +16 | 8 |
| 3 | Uruguay A.C. | 6 | 1 | 0 | 5 | 3 | 25 | −22 | 2 |
| 4 | Deutscher | 6 | 1 | 0 | 5 | 3 | 31 | −28 | 2 |

Source: rsssf.com
