= Uruguay Athletic Club =

Uruguay A.C.
- Full name: Uruguay Athletic Club
- Founded: August 10, 1898; 126 years ago
- Dissolved: 1904; 121 years ago
- Ground: Punta Carretas, Montevideo
- League: Primera División
- 1903: 7°
Home colours

Uruguay Athletic Club, also known as Uruguay Athletic, was an Uruguayan football club based in the district of Punta Carretas in Montevideo. (Note: There was another "Uruguay Athletic Club" from La Unión, a district of Montevideo, that was predecessor of Club Nacional de Football, established in 1899.) The club was one of the founding members of Uruguayan Football Association (AUF) along with CURCC, Albion and Deutscher, in 1900.

The team participated in the Primera División from 1900 to 1903 before being dissolved soon after.

== History ==
"Uruguay Athletic Club" was established on August 10, 1898, in the city of Punta Carretas, as a merging of American and Nacional F.C. The football squad's first line-up was Enrique Sardeson, Cardenal, Juan Sardeson (c), A. Clulow, A. Davie, Ch. Clulow, P. Ferrés, G. Swinden, F. Real de Azúa, Hooper, Thomas. Some players as the Sanderson brothers and executives of Albion F.C. would then leave the club to found Montevideo Wanderers in 1902.

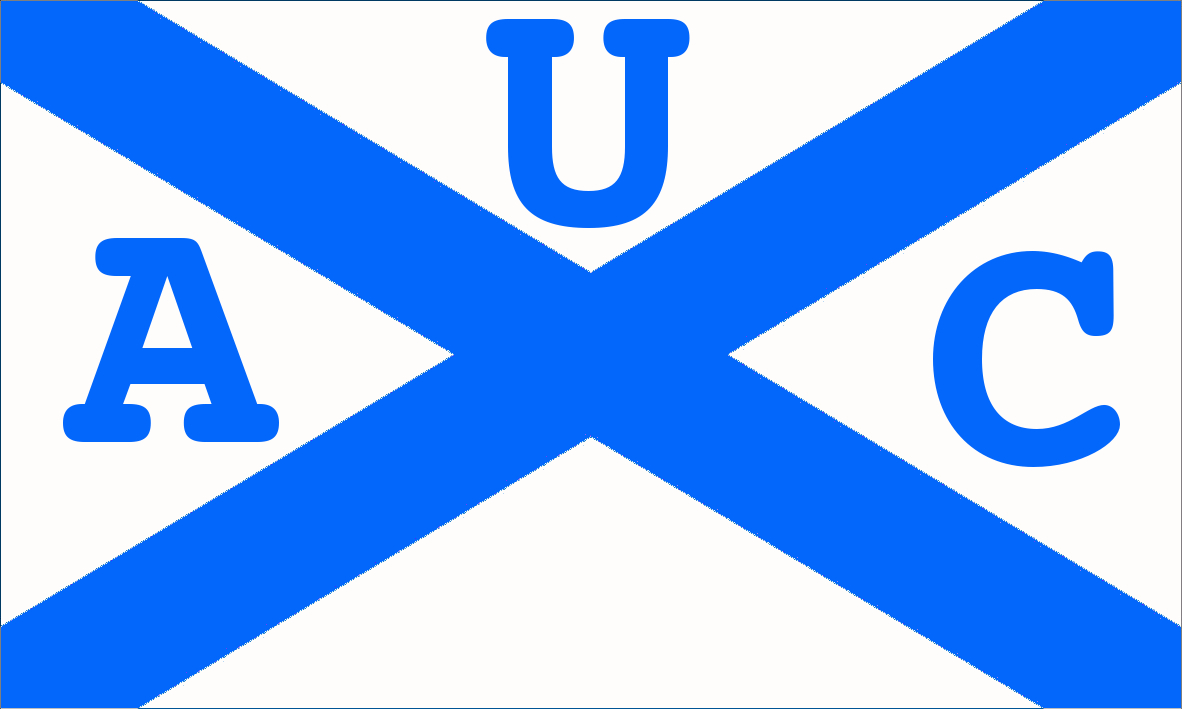
Flag of Uruguay A.C.

The field of Punta Carretas had been the Albion F.C. venue until April 1899, when the club moved to the Paso Molino district. Uruguay A.C. remained in Punta Carretas, becoming the main team in the city. In 1900, Uruguay A.C. was invited to establish a football league with the purpose of organising a football competition in Uruguay. As a result, Uruguay A.C. became founding member of "The Uruguay Association Football League" (currently the AUF) in 1900, along with Albion, CURCC and Deutscher with the first Uruguayan Primera División championship being held that same year.

Uruguay A.C. took part in the first four seasons of Primera División, with its best performance reached in 1901 when the squad totalized 7 points. 1903 would be the last year of Uruguay A.C. playing in the top division. At the end of the season, the squad finished last (although there was no relegations), never returning to official competitions.

It is believed the club was dissolved in 1904.
