= 1902 Campeonato Uruguayo Primera División =

3rd season of the top-tier football league in Uruguay

Primera División
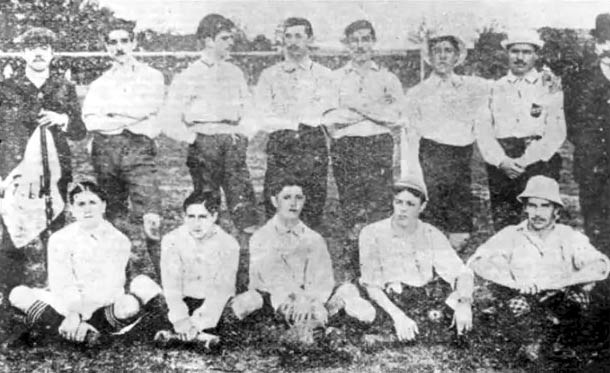
- Nacional, champions
- Season: 1902 (3rd)
- Champions: Nacional
- Matches: 30
- Goals: 115 (3.83 per match)
- Top goalscorer: Bolívar Céspedes (11) (Nacional)

The 1902 Primera División was the 3rd. season of top-flight football in Uruguay.

== Overview ==
The tournament consisted of a round-robin championship. It involved six teams, and the champion was Club Nacional de Football after winning all matches played.

== Teams ==
Team	City	Stadium	Capacity	Foundation	Seasons	Consecutive seasons	Titles	1901
Albion	Montevideo			1 June 1891	2	2	-	5th
CURCC	Montevideo			28 September 1891	2	2	2	1st
Deutscher	Montevideo			1896	2	2	-	4th
Nacional	Montevideo	Gran Parque Central	7,000	14 May 1899	1	1	-	2nd
Triunfo	Montevideo				-	-	-	-
Uruguay Athletic	Montevideo			10 August 1898	2	2	-	3rd

== League standings ==
Pos	Team	Pld	W	D	L	GF	GA	GD	Pts
1	Nacional	10	10	0	0	40	5	+35	20
2	CURCC	10	8	0	2	34	7	+27	16
3	Deutscher	10	4	1	5	18	29	−11	9
4	Uruguay Athletic	10	3	0	7	6	22	−16	6
5	Albion	10	2	1	7	9	21	−12	5
6	Triunfo	10	2	0	8	8	31	−23	4

Source: rsssf.com

1902 Primera División Champion

1st title
