= Bristol Football Club =

Uruguayan football club

Bristol
- Full name: Bristol Football Club
- Founded: 1904
- Dissolved: 1915; 110 years ago
- Ground: Montevideo
- League: Primera División
- 1915: 9th. (relegated)
Home colours

Bristol Football Club was a Uruguayan football club, located in Montevideo, that played in the Primera División during the first decades of the 20th. century. The club, founded in 1904, developed a rivalry with Club Nacional de Football, but lost relevance until it was dissolved in 1915.

== History ==
The club took its name from the homonymous city in England, sharing name with two British clubs, Bristol City F.C. and Bristol Rovers F.C.

Bristol F.C. was regarded as an elitist club due to the institution was composed by members of the high society. Moreover, club executives always expressed their strong opposition to bring professionalism to football, mainly to avoid the addition of working classes to Bristol.

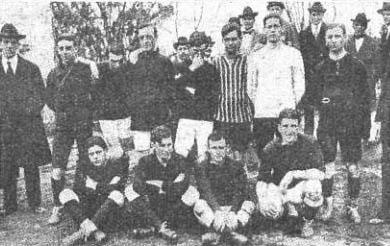
A Bristol FC team pictured in October 1914

In 1911, a group of footballers of Nacional that had left the club in disagreement with changes carried out by the committee led by president José María Delgado, joined Bristol F.C. Some of them were Jorge Pacheco, Juan Pena, Luis Carbone, Alberto Century (topscorer in 1909 and 1910 with 20 and 19 goals), among others.

Following the principles of amateurism, Bristol F.C. strongly opposed to any form of economic retribution to its footballers, and was even accused of having refused to play with working class members. By those times, Bristol also developed a strong rivalry with Nacional. In a match played on October 15, Bristol included 10 former Nacional players in the starting line-up.

In 1913, Bristol was relegated to División Intermedia, but the team earned promotion after one season, playing in 1915. Nevertheless, the team made a poor campaign totalising 11 points in 18 matches, and was relegated again (along with Club Independencia), being folded that same year.

As Nacional declined to participate in the 1914 Tie Cup Final v Argentine club River Plate, the AUF asked Bristol F.C. to play in replacement of Nacional. Bristol accepted, being the Uruguayan representative in the competition, but was beat by the Argentine team 1–0.

== Titles ==
- Segunda División (2): 1907, 1914
