= Deutscher Fussball Klub =

Deutscher
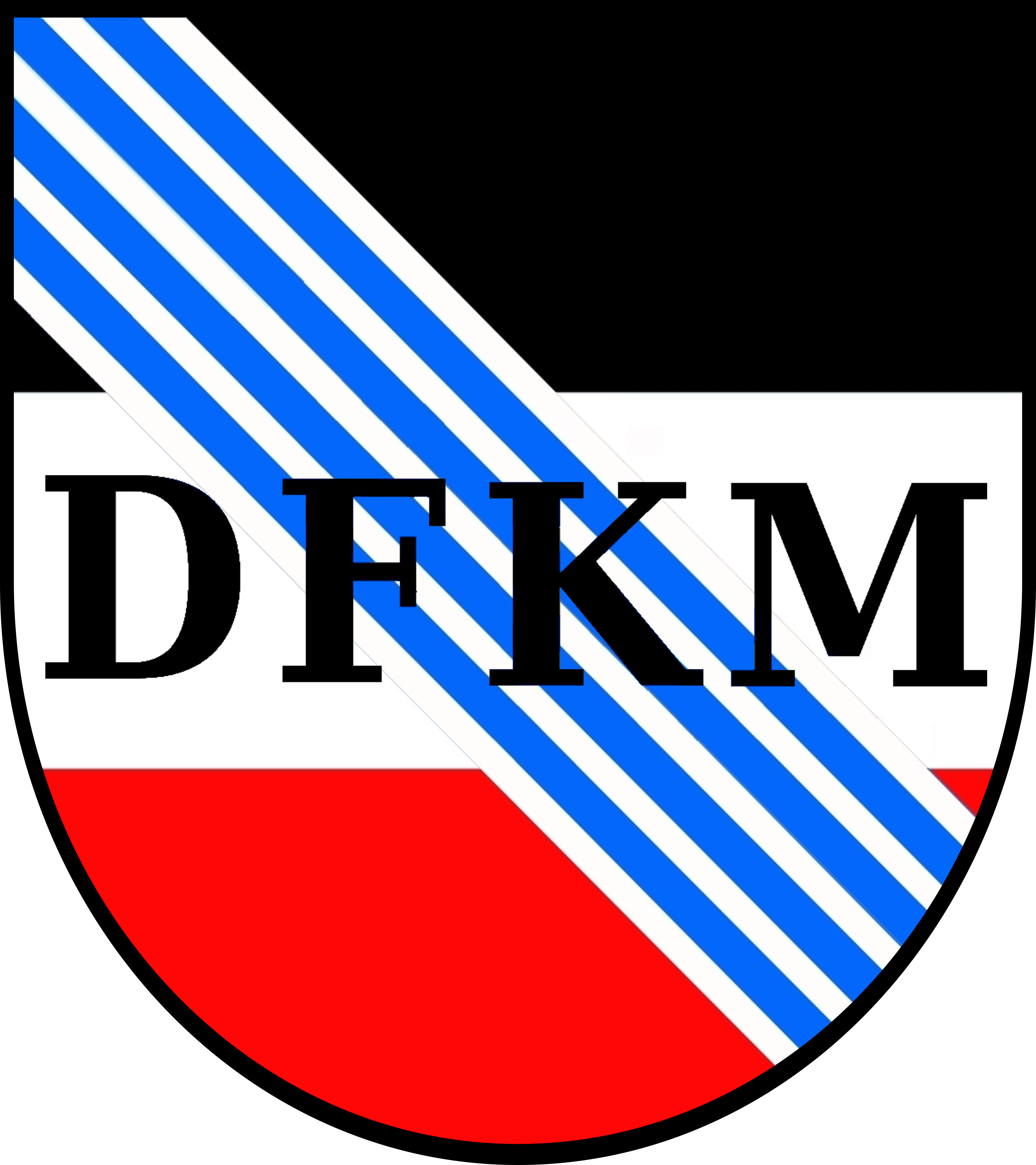
- Full name: Deutscher Fussball Klub
- Nickname: Teutones
- Founded: 23 May 1897; 129 years ago
- Dissolved: 1909; 117 years ago
- Ground: Parque Central, Montevideo
- League: Primera División
- 1909: 9°
Home colours

Deutscher Fussball Klub was a Uruguayan football club based in Montevideo. The club was one of the founding members of Uruguayan Football Association (AUF) along with CURCC, Albion and Uruguay A.C., in 1900.

The team participated in the Primera División from 1900 to 1909 before being dissolved that same year.

== History ==
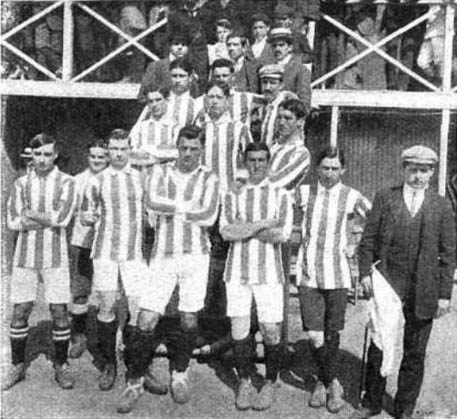
Montevideo A.C. that played a friendly match v. Argentino de Quilmes, November 1908. One year later the club would be dissolved

First kit (1900-07)

The club had been established by German immigrants under the name "Deutscher Fussball Klub" in 1896 although the official foundation was on 23 May 1897. in 1900 the club took part of the first Uruguayan championship, finishing last. The squad's best performances were in 1902 and 1903, finishing in the 3rd position.

Deutscher played in different venues along its history. In 1900 the "Transatlántica" railway company gave the club a field in Parque Central. Deutscher played there the inaugural game v. CURCC on 25 May 1900. The other field of Parque Central, called "the international", was given to Club Nacional de Football.

No championship was held in 1904, although several friendly matches were played. When official competition returned in 1905, the club registered under a new name, "Sport Club Teutonia". The club also changed its statute, becoming an institution managed by a committee formed by German and Uruguayan executives.

Nevertheless, the club changed its name again at the end of 1906, switching to "Club Atlético Montevideo". The club was handled mainly by criollos in those years. Under that name, the club also changed its colors, wearing a striped light blue and white jersey, playing the 1907, 1908 and 1909 tournaments.
