= 1923 FUF Primera División =

Primera División (FUF)
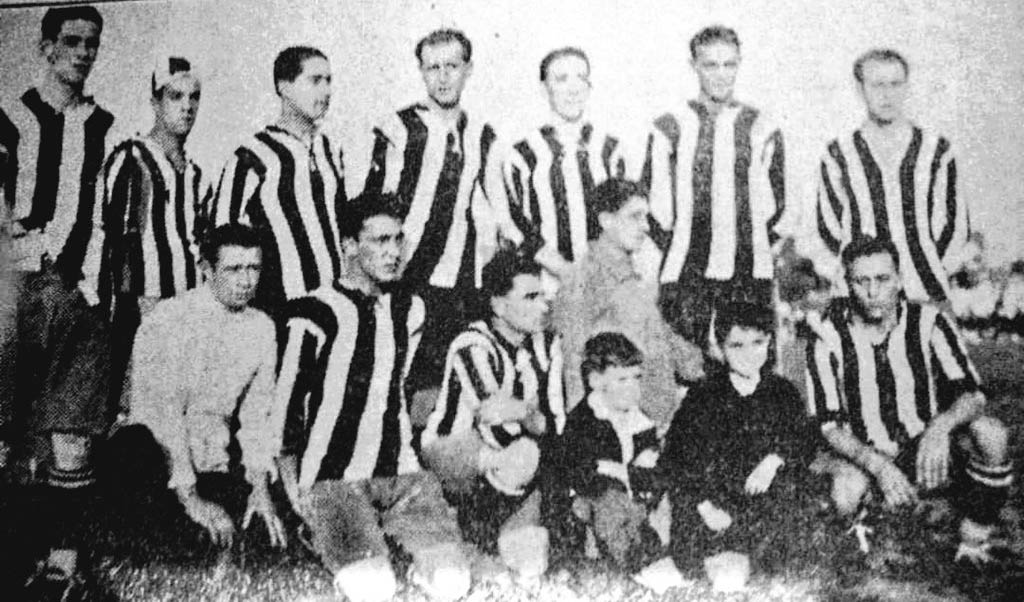
- Wanderers, champions
- Season: 1923
- Champions: Montevideo Wanderers (1st title)
- Matches: 496
- Goals: 1,200 (2.42 per match)

The 1923 Primera División championship was the first tournament organized by the Uruguayan Football Federation (FUF), a dissident association founded by clubs Central Español and Peñarol that had recently disaffiliated from the Uruguayan Football Association (AUF). The tournament was held simultaneously with the AUF, in the episode known as the "schism of Uruguayan football".

== Overview ==
The tournament consisted of a round-robin tournament. It involved 32 teams, all newly enrolled to this new federation, and many of them had close relationship with the CA Penarol baptized teams with names such as "Peñarol del Plata", "Roland Moor" or "Roberto Chery" which directly referenced that club. Finally, Atlético Wanderers won the title. The squad played the tournament with an alternate team due to the senior squad was participating of the official 1923 Primera División (AUF).

== League standings ==
Pos	Team	Pld	W	D	L	GF	GA	GD	Pts
1	Montevideo Wanderers	31	29	1	1	75	8	+67	59
2	Peñarol	31	28	1	2	100	10	+90	57
3	Lito Cuadrado	31	23	4	4	76	17	+59	50
4	Central	31	22	3	6	68	22	+46	47
5	Peñarol del Plata	31	18	8	5	54	21	+33	44
6	Colón	31	19	5	7	58	26	+32	43
7	Rosarino Central	31	17	9	5	47	27	+20	43
8	Olimpia	31	17	8	6	52	28	+24	42
9	Misiones	31	16	9	6	38	25	+13	41
10	Sud América	31	18	5	8	40	34	+6	41
11	Defensor	31	16	6	9	45	24	+21	38
12	Roberto Chery	31	16	6	9	46	38	+8	38
13	Roland Moor	31	15	7	9	42	39	+3	37
14	Las Piedras	31	16	4	11	40	35	+5	36
15	Uruguayo	31	13	9	9	31	26	+5	35
16	Oriental Pocitos	31	14	3	14	47	36	+11	31
17	Solferino	31	12	6	13	35	28	+7	30
18	Charley	31	10	10	11	38	33	+5	30
19	Bequelo	31	12	5	14	31	39	−8	29
20	Miramar Misiones	31	10	6	15	30	41	−11	26
21	Sayago	31	8	9	14	26	37	−11	25
22	Reformers	31	7	6	18	19	41	−22	20
23	San Carlos Taurino	31	5	10	16	28	51	−23	20
24	Triumph Juniors	31	5	9	17	17	59	−42	19
25	Treinta y Tres	31	6	6	19	21	60	−39	18
26	River Plate	31	5	8	18	14	56	−42	18
27	Miguelete	31	5	7	19	17	47	−30	17
28	Belvedere	31	6	5	20	20	53	−33	17
29	Firestone	31	5	6	20	17	64	−47	16
30	Livingstone	31	3	9	19	14	68	−54	15
31	Sportivo Aguada	31	1	7	23	10	78	−68	9
32	Uruguay Forever	31	0	1	30	4	29	−25	1

== See also ==
- 1923 Uruguayan Primera División of AUF
