= 1922 Campeonato Uruguayo Primera División =

22nd season of the top-tier football league in Uruguay

Uruguayan Primera División
- Season: 1922 (22nd)
- Champions: Nacional
- Relegated: Peñarol and Central
- Matches: 132
- Goals: 279 (2.11 per match)

The Uruguayan Championship 1922 was the 22nd season of Uruguay's top-flight football league.

== Overview ==
The tournament consisted of a two-wheel championship of all against all. It involved twelve teams, and the champion was Nacional.

This year there was a schism in Uruguayan football, Peñarol and Central being disaffiliated for disobeying the mandates of the AUF. Both clubs then founded the Uruguayan Football Federation, whose tournaments were not officially recognized by the AUF. This division between Uruguayan football organizations remained until 1925, when the Uruguayan state intervened through its president, José Serrato.

== Teams ==
| Team | City | Stadium | Capacity | Foundation | Seasons | Consecutive seasons | Titles | 1921 |
|---|---|---|---|---|---|---|---|---|
| Belgrano | Montevideo | | | | 3 | 3 | - | 5th |
| Central | Montevideo | | | 5 January 1905 | 13 | 13 | - | 8th |
| Charley | Montevideo | | | | 5 | 5 | - | 9th |
| Dublin | Montevideo | | | | 11 | 6 | - | 11th |
| Lito | Montevideo | | | 1917 | 1 | 1 | - | 6th |
| Liverpool | Montevideo | | | 15 February 1915 | 2 | 2 | - | 7th |
| Nacional | Montevideo | Gran Parque Central | 15,000 | 14 May 1899 | 20 | 20 | 8 | 2nd |
| Peñarol | Montevideo | | | 28 September 1891 | 21 | 21 | 7 | 1st |
| Rampla Juniors | Montevideo | | | 7 January 1914 | - | - | - | - |
| Universal | Montevideo | | | | 10 | 10 | - | 3rd |
| Uruguay Onward | Montevideo | | | | 2 | 2 | - | 10th |
| Montevideo Wanderers | Montevideo | | | 15 August 1902 | 18 | 18 | 2 | 4th |

== League standings ==
| Pos | Team | Pld | W | D | L | GF | GA | GD | Pts |
|---|---|---|---|---|---|---|---|---|---|
| 1 | Nacional | 22 | 15 | 6 | 1 | 48 | 7 | +41 | 36 |
| 2 | Montevideo Wanderers | 22 | 15 | 5 | 2 | 32 | 9 | +23 | 35 |
| 3 | Rampla Juniors | 22 | 10 | 8 | 4 | 22 | 37 | −15 | 28 |
| 4 | Peñarol | 22 | 12 | 3 | 7 | 36 | 7 | +29 | 27 (Note: Disaffiliated after the sixteenth match.) |
| 5 | Lito | 22 | 8 | 8 | 6 | 26 | 20 | +6 | 24 |
| 6 | Belgrano | 22 | 8 | 7 | 7 | 16 | 21 | −5 | 23 |
| 7 | Liverpool | 22 | 7 | 8 | 7 | 23 | 13 | +10 | 22 |
| 8 | Universal | 22 | 6 | 9 | 7 | 22 | 21 | +1 | 21 |
| 9 | Central | 22 | 4 | 8 | 10 | 22 | 15 | +7 | 16 |
| 10 | Uruguay Onward | 22 | 4 | 7 | 11 | 16 | 29 | −13 | 15 |
| 11 | Charley | 22 | 3 | 4 | 15 | 11 | 45 | −34 | 10 |
| 12 | Dublin | 22 | 1 | 3 | 18 | 5 | 55 | −50 | 5 |

Source: rsssf.com
Notes:

Uruguayan Champion 1922
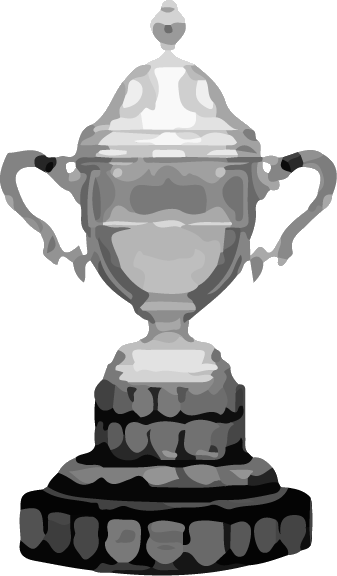
Nacional
9th title
