= River Plate F.C. =

Uruguayan football club

River Plate
- Full name: River Plate Football Club
- Nickname: Darseneros
- Founded: 1897
- Dissolved: 1925; 101 years ago
- Ground: Parque Federico Saroldi
- League: Uruguayan Football Federation
- 1923: 26th.
Home colours	Away colours

River Plate Football Club was a Uruguayan football club, founded in 1897. River Plate is considered one of the four giants of the first era in Uruguayan football, alongside rivals Montevideo Wanderers and the current big two: CURCC (Peñarol) and Nacional. River reached important achievements during the first years of football in the country. In fact, the national side's uniform is a light blue ("celeste") shirt in tribute to River Plate victory over Argentine team Alumni, when the squad had to wear an alternate jersey to solve a color similarity between both teams.

== History ==
In 1897, a group of Port of Montevideo workers met to establish a football team, which was named "Cagancha F.C.". When they requested Uruguayan Football Association (AUF) to join the body, they were informed that only English names were accepted. Therefore, the team was renamed as "River Plate F.C." but the AUF alleged that they also must have English-native players so the request was denied again.

Due to the fact that River Plate belonged to the Port of Montevideo zone, they were nicknamed Darseneros (Dockers), the same nickname that current River Plate of Montevideo have adopted. In 1901 the AUF finally approved the affiliation of River Plate to the Association, soon after another criollo team, Nacional, had joined the body. The team was assigned to the second Division and played there from 1902 until the 1906 seasons. In 1905 River Plate was relegated to the Second Division after the team made a disappointing campaign in Primera.

Originally, River Plate jersey was black, but it would be changed to red and white in commemoration of the 1904 Revolution (also known as the Uruguayan last civil war).

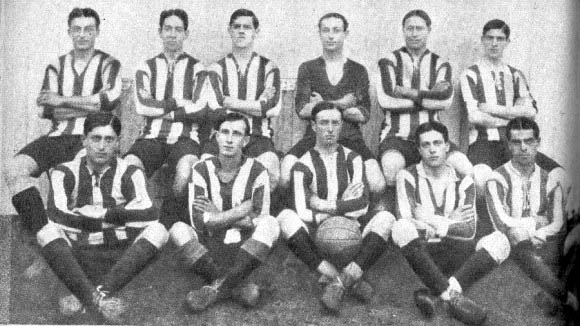
River Plate team of 1914, the year the club won its last title

In 1906 River Plate was promoted to Primera División, winning its first title in 1908. In April 1910, River Plate played against Argentine team Alumni, the most successful club in that country by then. Because of both teams having similar uniforms, River Plate wore an alternative light blue jersey and won the match by 2–1. River line up was: Cabalotti; José and Miguel Benincasa; Louried, Sanz, García, Módena, Dacal, D'Agosti, Raymonda and Seoane. Some months later, in August 1910, Uruguay national team wore the light blue jersey for the first time, facing the Argentine side. Uruguay won the match by 3–1.

The club would win another three championships, in 1910, 1913 and 1914. In 1920 the team was relegated to second division.

Nevertheless, River Plate joined dissident Uruguayan Football Federation in 1923 that organised its own tournament in 1923. River Plate finished 26th., being relegated with other 16 teams. That would be the last appearance of the club in the top division of Uruguay. By 1925 River Plate F.C. had been dissolved.

== Honours ==
=== National ===
- Primera División
  - Winners (4): 1908, 1910, 1913, 1914
- Copa de Honor (Uruguay)
  - Winners (1): 1912
- Segunda División
  - Winners (3): 1903, 1905, 1906

=== International ===
- Copa de Honor Cousenier
  - Winners (1): 1912
