= Uruguayan Football Federation =

Uruguay
- Founded: 1923
- Folded: 1925; 100 years ago
- Headquarters: Montevideo
- FIFA affiliation: No

The Uruguayan Football Federation (Spanish: Federación Uruguaya de Football or FUF) was a federation of football clubs founded in Uruguay in 1923 which existed alongside the Uruguayan Football Association (AUF) during the amateur era of Uruguayan football. The Federation was created in response to the Uruguayan football schism, which originated with the disaffiliation of AUF Peñarol and Central during the 1922 championship.

National football championships were organized in tandem with the AUF between 1923 and 1925. In 1925, the Uruguayan government intervened to impose a merger between the old AUF and the FUF into a single federation.

== Competitions ==
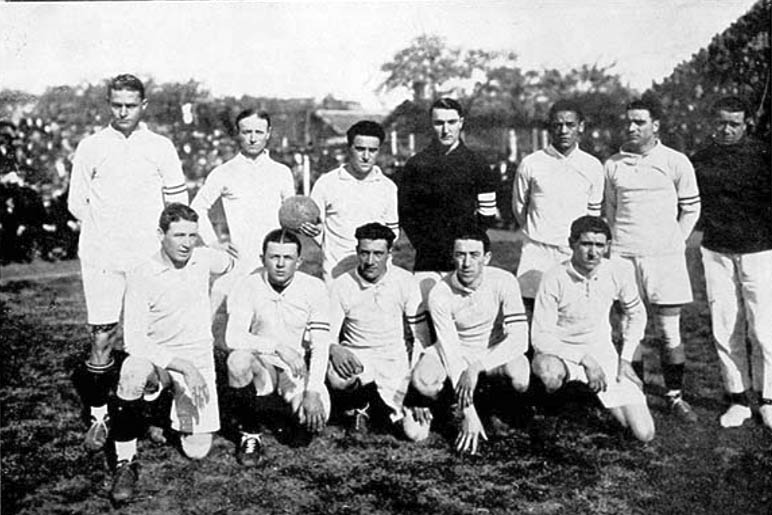
National side of FUF that played v Argentina (AAmF) in 1924

The FUF organized tournaments parallel to the AUF in all categories, as listed below; these tournaments are not considered official by the current Uruguayan football governing body, the Uruguayan Football Association (AUF).

=== Domestic ===
- Primera División (1923–25)
- División Intermedia (1923–25)
- División Extra (1923–25)

=== International ===
- Copa Campeonato del Río de la Plata (1923) (Note: Organised jointly with Argentine dissident body, Asociación Amateurs de Football.)
