= 1969 Copa Libertadores finals =

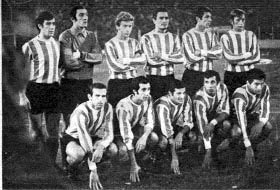
- Estudiantes LP, champions
- Event: 1969 Copa Libertadores
Nacional	Estudiantes (LP)
(Uruguay)	(Argentina)
0	3
- Estudiantes won 3-0 on aggregate.

First leg
Nacional	Estudiantes (LP)
0	1
- Date: May 15, 1969
- Venue: Estadio Centenario, Montevideo
- Referee: Massaro (Chile)
- Attendance: 65,000

Second leg
Estudiantes (LP)	Nacional
2	0
- Date: May 22, 1969
- Venue: Estudiantes, La Plata
- Referee: Delgado (Colombia)
- Attendance: 55,000

The 1969 Copa Libertadores finals were the two-legged final that decided the winner of the 1969 Copa Libertadores, the 10th edition of the Copa Libertadores de América, South America's premier international club football tournament organized by CONMEBOL.

The finals were contested in two-legged home-and-away format between Argentine team Estudiantes de La Plata and Uruguayan team Nacional. The first leg was hosted by Nacional at Estadio Centenario of Montevideo on May 15, 1969, while the second leg was played at Estudiantes Stadium in La Plata on May 22, 1969.

Estudiantes won the series 3-0 on aggregate, winning their 2nd title Copa Libertadores.

== Qualified teams ==
Team	Previous finals app.
(Uruguay) Nacional	1964, 1967
(Argentina) Estudiantes (LP)	**1968**

- **Bold** indicates winning years

== Venues ==
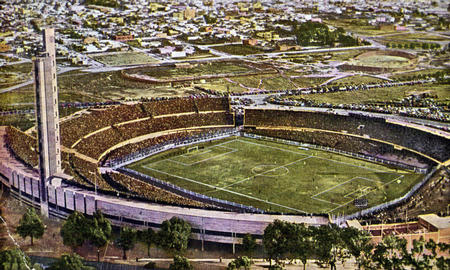
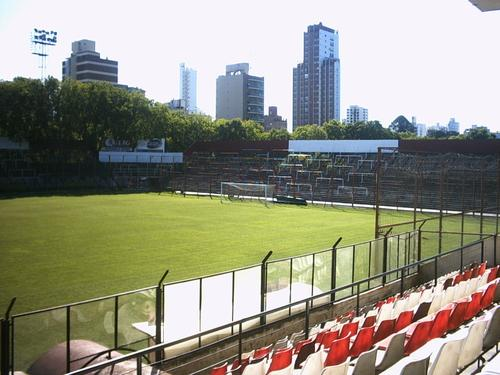
Estadio Centenario and Estudiantes Stadium, venues for the finals

== Match details ==
=== First leg ===
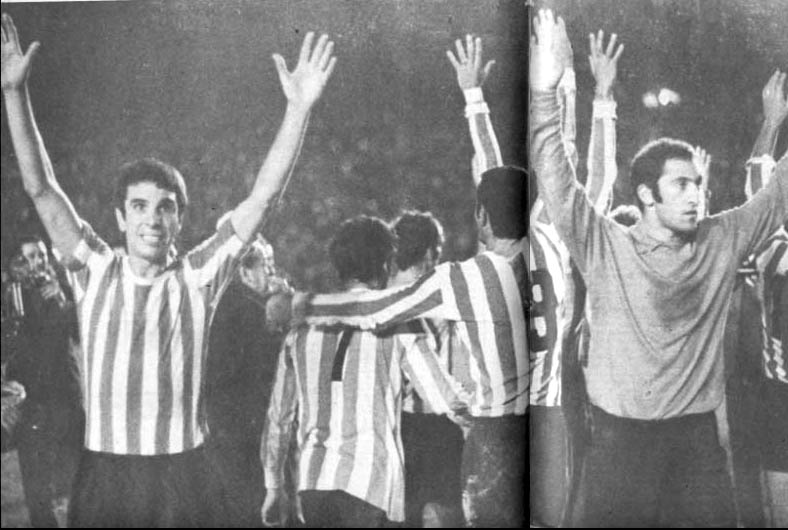
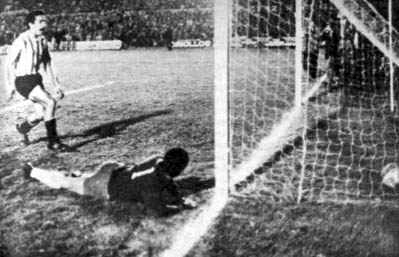
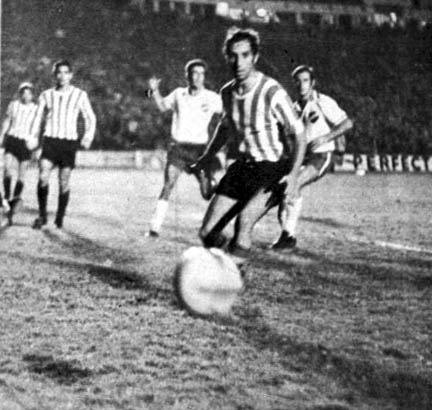
Some moments of the match in Montevideo, fltr: Estudiantes saluting their fans, the goal scored by Flores, and Bilardo saving the goal
1969 Copa Libertadores finals
May 15, 1969
First leg

Nacional (Uruguay)	0–1	(Argentina) Estudiantes (LP)
	Report	Flores 66'

Estadio Centenario, Montevideo
Attendance: 65,000
Referee: Domingo Massaro (Chile)

**Nacional**	**Estudiantes LP**

GK	1	(Brazil) Manga
DF	3	(Uruguay) Atilio Ancheta
DF	6	(Uruguay) Emilio Álvarez
DF	2	(Uruguay) Luis Ubiña
DF	5	(Uruguay) Julio Montero Castillo
MF	4	(Uruguay) Juan Mujica
MF	8	(Chile) Ignacio Prieto
MF	10	(Uruguay) Ildo Maneiro	(substituted off) 77'
FW	7	(Uruguay) Luis Cubilla
FW	9	(Brazil) Célio
FW		(Uruguay) Julio C. Morales
Substitutes:
MF		(Uruguay) Víctor Espárrago	(substituted on) 77'
Manager:
(Brazil) Zezé Moreira

GK	1	(Argentina) Alberto José Poletti
DF	15	(Argentina) Néstor Togneri
DF	2	(Argentina) Ramón Aguirre Suárez
DF	3	(Argentina) Raúl Madero
DF	6	(Argentina) Oscar Malbernat
MF	5	(Argentina) Carlos Pachamé
MF	8	(Argentina) Carlos Bilardo
MF	10	(Argentina) Eduardo Flores
MF	17	(Czech Republic) Christian Rudzki	(substituted off) 70'
FW	9	(Argentina) Marcos Conigliaro
FW	11	(Argentina) Juan Ramón Verón
Substitutes:
FW		(Argentina) Felipe Ribaudo	(substituted on) 70'
Manager:
(Argentina) Osvaldo Zubeldía

=== Second leg ===
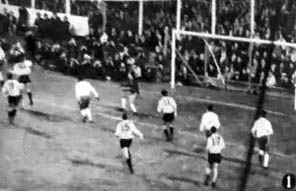
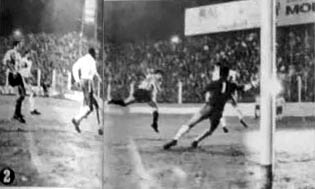
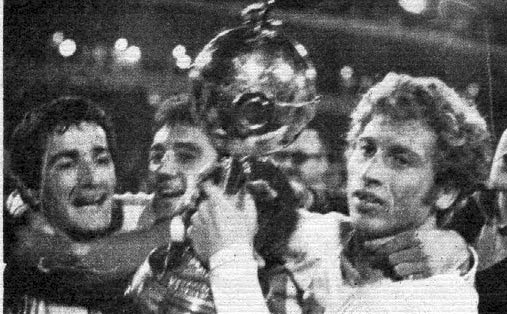
Some moments of the second leg in La Plata, including the celebrations
May 22, 1969
Second leg

Estudiantes (LP) (Argentina)	2–0	(Uruguay) Nacional
Flores 22'; Conigliaro 37'	Report

Estadio Estudiantes, La Plata
Attendance: 55,000
Referee: Osmar Delgado (Colombia)

**Estudiantes LP**	**Nacional**

GK	1	(Argentina) Alberto José Poletti
DF	15	(Argentina) Néstor Togneri
DF	2	(Argentina) Ramón Aguirre Suárez
DF	3	(Argentina) Raúl Madero
DF	6	(Argentina) Oscar Malbernat
MF	5	(Argentina) Carlos Pachamé
MF	8	(Argentina) Carlos Bilardo
MF	10	(Argentina) Eduardo Flores
MF	17	(Czech Republic) Christian Rudzki	(substituted off) 46'
FW	9	(Argentina) Marcos Conigliaro
FW	11	(Argentina) Juan Ramón Verón
Substitutes:
FW		(Argentina) Felipe Ribaudo	(substituted on) 46'
Manager:
(Argentina) Osvaldo Zubeldía

GK		(Brazil) Manga
DF		(Uruguay) Atilio Ancheta
DF		(Uruguay) Emilio Álvarez
DF		(Uruguay) Luis Ubiña
DF		(Uruguay) Julio Montero Castillo
DF		(Uruguay) Juan Mujica
MF		(Chile) Ignacio Prieto
MF		(Uruguay) Víctor Espárrago	(substituted off) 46'
FW		(Uruguay) Luis Cubilla
FW	**14**	(Uruguay) Rubén García
FW		(Uruguay) Julio C. Morales
Substitutes:
MF		(Uruguay) Alcides Silveira	(substituted on) 46'
Manager:
(Brazil) Zezé Moreira
