= 1968 Copa Libertadores finals =

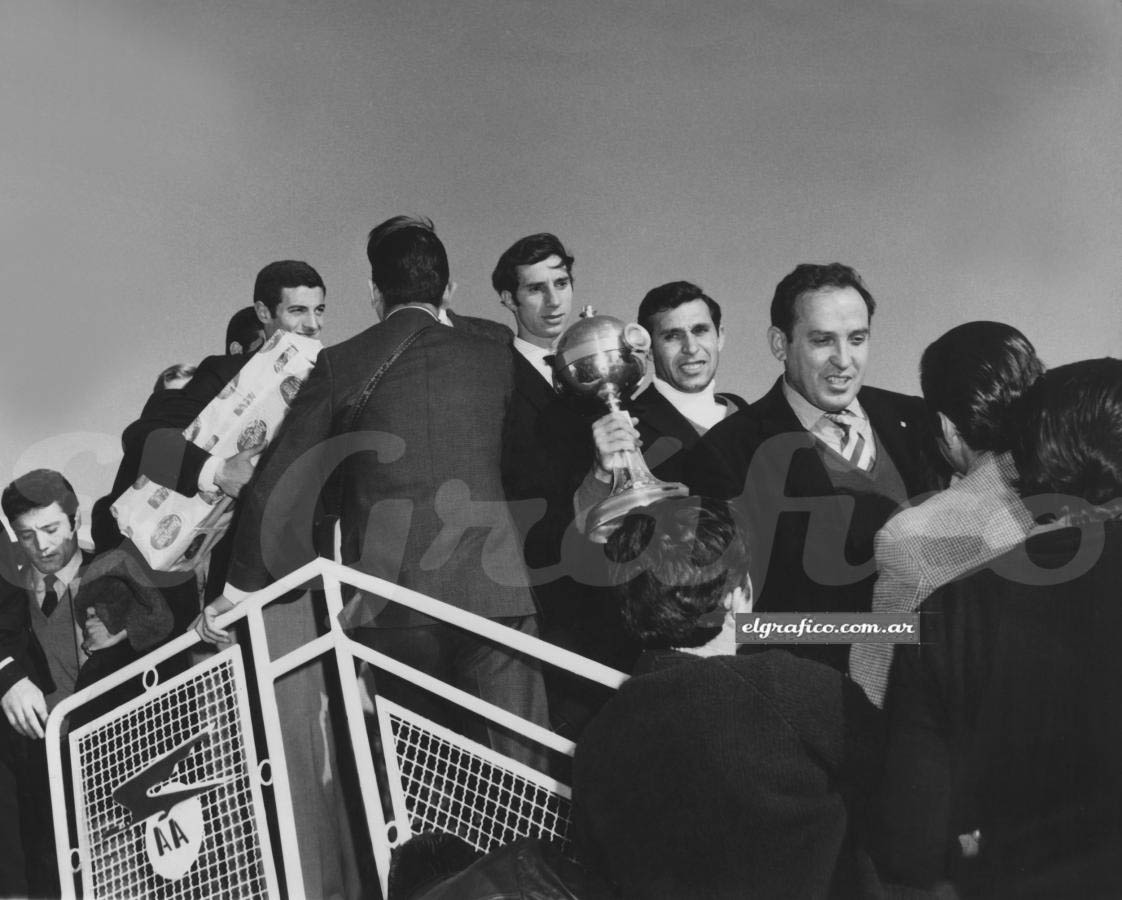
- Estudiantes de La Plata, champions
- Event: 1968 Copa Libertadores
Estudiantes (LP)	Palmeiras
(Argentina)	(Brazil)
- 2–2 on points Estudiantes won after a play-off

First leg
Estudiantes (LP)	Palmeiras
2	1
- Date: 2 May 1968
- Venue: Estudiantes, La Plata
- Referee: Esteban Marino (Uruguay)

Second leg
Palmeiras	Estudiantes (LP)
3	1
- Date: 7 May 1968
- Venue: Pacaembu, São Paulo
- Referee: Domingo Massaro (Chile)

Play-off
Palmeiras	Estudiantes (LP)
0	2
- Date: 16 May 1968
- Venue: Estadio Centenario, Montevideo
- Referee: César Orozco (Peru)
- Attendance: 55,000

The 1968 Copa Libertadores finals was the final two-legged tie to determine the 1968 Copa Libertadores champion. It was contested by Argentine club Estudiantes de La Plata and Brazilian club Palmeiras. The first leg of the tie was played on 2 May at Estudiantes' home field, with the second leg played on 7 May at Palmeiras'. Estudiantes and Palmeiras played in their 1st and 2nd Copa Libertadores finals, respectively. Palmeiras last appearance was in 1961, in which they were beaten by defending champions Peñarol. Estudiantes was appearing in their first ever final ever.

Estudiantes won the series after winning a tie-breaking playoff 2-0 at Montevideo's Estadio Centenario.

== Qualified teams ==
Team	Previous finals appearances (bold indicates winners)
(Argentina) Estudiantes (LP)	None
(Brazil) Palmeiras	1961

== Venues ==
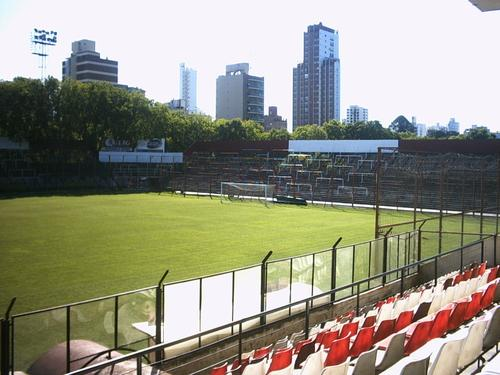
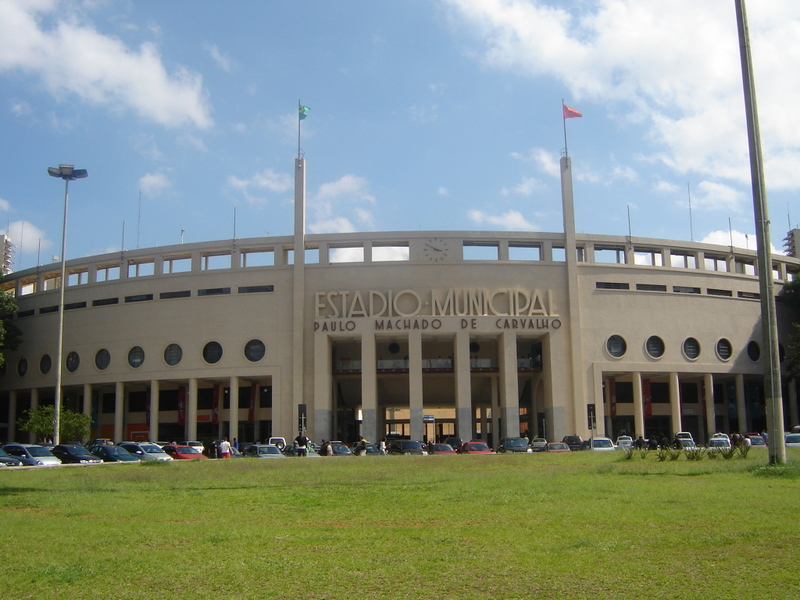
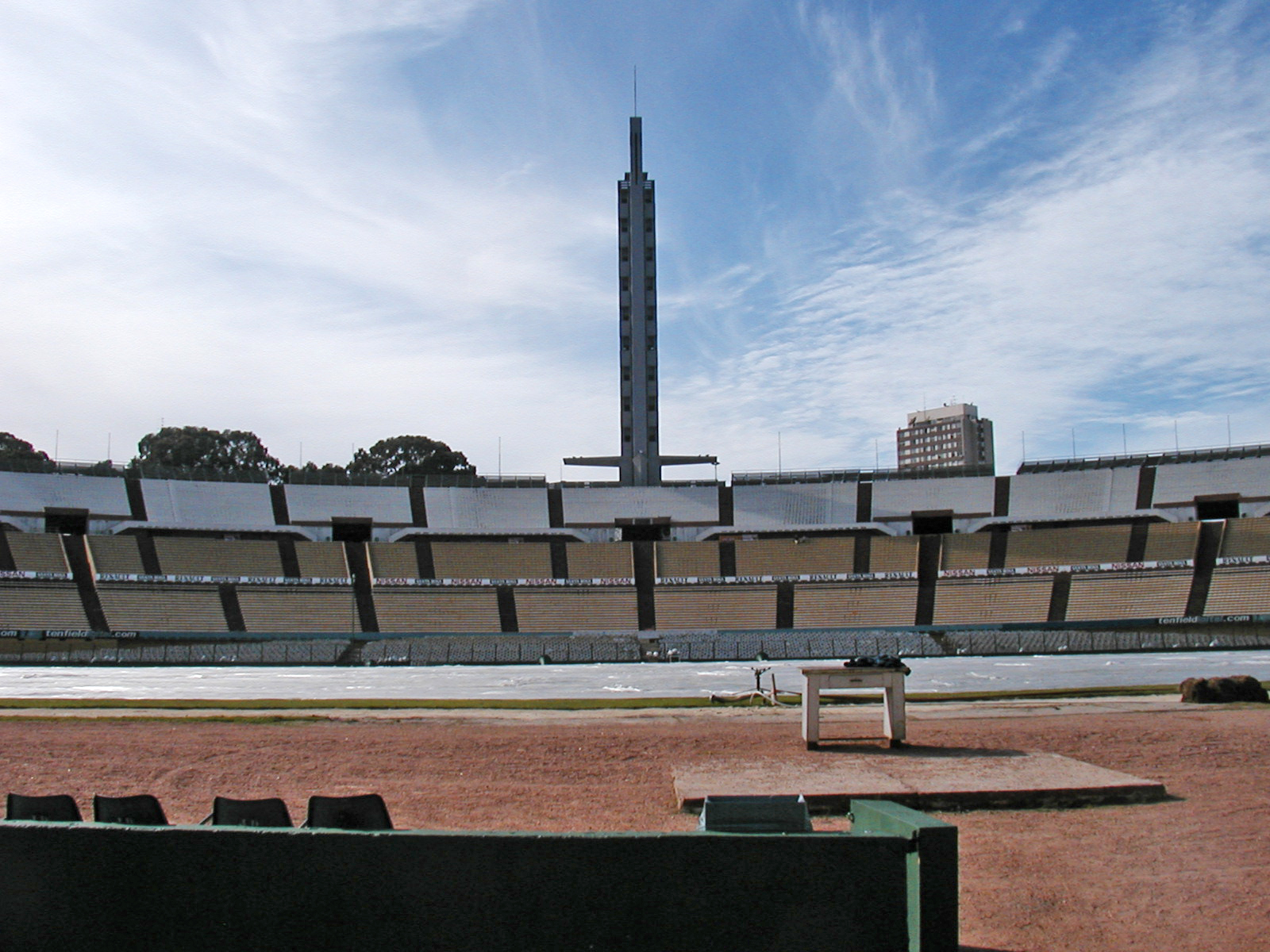
Estudiantes de La Plata, Pacaembu and Centenario were the venues for the finals

== Rules ==
The finals will be played over two legs; home and away. The team that accumulates the most points —two for a win, one for a draw, zero for a loss— after the two legs will be crowned the champion. Should the two teams be tied on points after the second leg a playoff was at a neutral venue will become the next tie-breaker. Goal difference is going to be used as a last resort.

== Route to the finals ==
Palmeiras qualified to the 1968 Copa Libertadores as the 1967 Taça Brasil champions, defeating Náutico 2-0 in a playoff played at the Estádio do Maracanã. This was Palmeiras' second title in the competition. Estudiantes qualified as runners-up of the 1967 Torneo Nacional. The team did win the 1967 Metropolitano after defeating Copa Libertadores holders Racing Club.

Estudiantes
Round
Palmeiras
Main article: 1968 Copa Libertadores First round:
Group 1

Team	Pld	W	D	L	GF	GA	GD	Pts
(Argentina) **Estudiantes**	**6**	**5**	**1**	**0**	**12**	**3**	**+9**	**11**
(Argentina) Independiente	6	2	1	3	8	10	-2	**5**
(Colombia) Deportivo Cali	6	2	1	3	6	10	-4	**5**
(Colombia) Millonarios	6	1	1	4	6	9	-3	**3**

First round
Main article: 1968 Copa Libertadores First round:
Group 5

Team	Pld	W	D	L	GF	GA	GD	Pts
(Brazil) **Palmeiras**	**6**	**5**	**1**	**0**	**12**	**3**	**+9**	**11**
(Venezuela) Dep. Portugués	6	2	1	3	5	11	+6	**5**
(Brazil) Náutico	6	1	2	3	7	8	-1	**4**
(Venezuela) Deportivo Galicia	6	2	0	4	5	7	-2	**4**

Main article: 1968 Copa Libertadores Second round:
Group A

Team	Pld	W	D	L	GF	GA	GD	Pts
(Argentina) **Estudiantes**	**4**	**3**	**0**	**1**	**4**	**2**	**+2**	**6**
(Argentina) Independiente	4	2	0	2	7	3	+4	**4**
(Peru) Universitario	4	1	0	3	1	7	-6	**2**

Second round
Main article: 1968 Copa Libertadores Second round:
Group C

Team	Pld	W	D	L	GF	GA	GD	Pts
(Brazil) **Palmeiras**	**4**	**3**	**0**	**1**	**7**	**4**	**+3**	**6**
(Paraguay) Guaraní	4	2	0	2	7	7	0	**4**
(Chile) U. Católica	4	1	0	3	6	9	-3	**2**

Opponent
Result (on points)
Legs

Semifinals
Opponent
Result (on points)
Legs
(Argentina) Racing
2–2
(goal difference)
3–0 home; 2–0 away
1–1 playoff
(Uruguay) Peñarol
4–0
1–0 home; 1–2 away

=== First round ===
Estudiantes was drawn into Group 1 alongside Independiente, winners of the 1964 and 1965 editions of this tournament, and Colombian sides Deportivo Cali and Millonarios. The Pincharatas surprisingly cruised to the second round, assuring qualification, with a match to spare, after a run of 4 consecutive victories and a tie. Estudiantes defeated Independiente 2-4 in Avellaneda and won 0-1 and 1-2 in Colombia against Millonarios and Deportivo Cali, respectively. A 3-0 victory at home against Deportivo Cali was followed by a 0-0 draw vs Millonarios, which assured Estudiantes place into the second round. Estudiantes will beat Independiente 2-0 in their last match of this phase.

Palmeiras was drawn into Group 5. They were joined by fellow Brazilian club Náutico and Venezuelan outfits Deportivo Portugués and Deportivo Galicia. Like Estudiatnes, Palmeiras started their campaign well with a 5-victory streak that assured them of a place in the second round, with Tupãzinho, Ademir and Servílio being key players for the Verdão (tying 0-0 in their last, meaningless match against Náutico). The first match saw Palmeiras win in Recife 1-3 against Náutico. Two 1-2 away victories against the Venezuelan teams was followed by 1-0 win over Deportivo Galicia and a 2-0 triumph over Deportivo Portugués.

=== Second round and Semifinals ===
The second round was another group phase. Estudiantes were drawn in Group A alongside Independiente and Universitario. Universitario gave Estudiantes their first defeat in the tournament, 1-0, in Lima. However, Estudiantes came back strongly to win the rest of their matches. The Pincharatas defeated, once again, Independiente home and away (1-0 and 1-2, respectively) and secured their place in the Semifinals with a 1-0 triumph over Universitario. In Group C, Tupãzinho, Ademir and Servílio continued to shine as Palmeiras made their way into the last four of the competition. A 4-1 rout of Universidad Católica was followed by a disappointing 2-0 defeat to Guaraní. Two hard-earned wins, one 0-1 scoreline in Santiago against Universidad Católica and a 2-1 win at home vs Guaraní, was enough to get Palmeiras through.

In the Semifinals, Estudiantes played against defending champions Racing. The first leg was played in La Plata. Estudiantes won the match 3−0 with goals from Roberto Perfumo and a brace from the emerging figure Juan Ramón Verón. The second leg, played at Avellaneda, was won by Racing 2-0 with goals by Humberto Maschio and Rubén Fucceneco. Since the series was tied on points (2-2 each), a playoff in Buenos Aires was contested; it ended in a 1-1 draw with Juan Carlos Cárdenas and Verón scoring for each of their clubs. Since the match finished in a tie, goal difference was taken into account and Estudiantes advanced to the finals.

Palmeiras' semifinal match-up was against Peñarol, three-time winners of the Copa Libertadores, in a rematch of the 1961 final which Peñarol won. This time, Palmeiras started out well winning the first leg, played at home in São Paulo, with a 1−0 with the goal coming from Tupãzinho. The second leg, played in Montevideo, ended with a 1-2 scoreline in favor of Palmeiras with a brace by Tupãzinho. Héctor Silva scored the manyas lone goal. With a point aggregate of 4-0, Palmeiras advanced to the finals.

== Matches ==
=== First leg ===
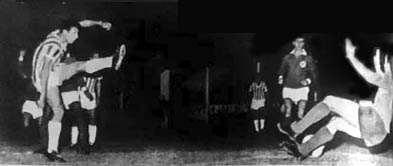
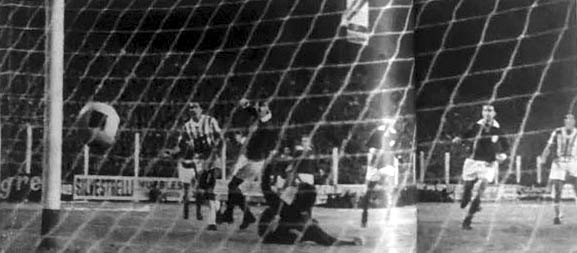
Two moments of the first match, held in La Plata. At left, the only goal scored by Juan Ramón Verón
1968 Copa Libertadores finals
2 May 1968
First leg

Estudiantes LP (Argentina)	2–1	(Brazil) Palmeiras
J.R. Verón 83'; E. Flores 87'		Servilio 30'

Estadio Estudiantes, La Plata
Attendance: 35,000
Referee: Esteban Marino (Uruguay)

**Estudiantes LP**	**Palmeiras**

GK	(Argentina) Alberto José Poletti
DF	(Argentina) Rodolfo Fucceneco
DF	(Argentina) Hugo Spadaro
DF	(Argentina) Raúl Madero
DF	(Argentina) Oscar Malbernat
MF	(Argentina) Carlos Pachamé
MF	(Argentina) Carlos Bilardo
MF	(Argentina) Eduardo Flores
FW	(Argentina) Felipe Ribaudo (substituted off)
FW	(Argentina) Marcos Conigliaro
FW	(Argentina) Juan Ramón Verón
Substitutes:
FW	(Argentina) Luis Lavezzi (substituted on)
Manager:
(Argentina) Osvaldo Zubeldía

GK	(Brazil) Valdir
DF	(Brazil) Geraldo Scalera
DF	(Brazil) Baldocchi
DF	(Brazil) Osmar
DF	(Brazil) Ferrari
MF	(Brazil) Ademir
MF	(Brazil) Dudú
FW	(Brazil) Suingue
FW	(Brazil) Tupãzinho
FW	(Brazil) Servílio
FW	(Brazil) Rinaldo
Manager:
(Argentina) Alfredo González

=== Second leg ===
7 May 1968
Second leg

Palmeiras (Brazil)	3–1	(Argentina) Estudiantes LP
Tupãzinho 10', 68'; Rinaldo 54'		J.R. Verón 72'

Pacaembu, São Paulo
Attendance: 40,000
Referee: Domingo Massaro (Chile)

**Palmeiras**	**Estudiantes LP**

GK	(Brazil) Valdir
DF	(Brazil) Geraldo Scalera
DF	(Brazil) Baldocchi
DF	(Brazil) Osmar
DF	(Brazil) Ferrari
MF	(Brazil) Ademir
MF	(Brazil) Dudú
FW	(Brazil) Servílio (substituted off)
FW	(Brazil) Tupãzinho
FW	(Brazil) Rinaldo
FW	(Brazil) Suingue
Substitutes:
FW	(Brazil) China (substituted on)
Manager:
(Argentina) Alfredo González

GK	(Argentina) Alberto José Poletti
DF	(Argentina) Hugo Spadaro
DF	(Argentina) Raúl Madero
DF	(Argentina) Rodolfo Fucceneco
DF	(Argentina) Carlos Pachamé
DF	(Argentina) Oscar Malbernat
MF	(Argentina) Carlos Bilardo
MF	(Argentina) Felipe Ribaudo
MF	(Argentina) Eduardo Flores (substituted off)
FW	(Argentina) Marcos Conigliaro
FW	(Argentina) Juan Ramón Verón
Substitutes:
FW	(Argentina) Néstor Togneri (substituted on)
Manager:
(Argentina) Osvaldo Zubeldía

=== Playoff ===
16 May 1968
Playoff

Palmeiras (Brazil)	0–2	(Argentina) Estudiantes LP
		Ribaudo 13'; J.R. Verón 82'

Estadio Centenario, Montevideo
Attendance: 55,000
Referee: César Orozco (Peru)

**Palmeiras**	**Estudiantes LP**

GK	(Brazil) Valdir
DF	(Brazil) Geraldo Scalera
DF	(Brazil) Baldocchi
DF	(Brazil) Osmar
MF	(Brazil) Ademir
MF	(Brazil) Ferrari
MF	(Brazil) Suingue
FW	(Brazil) Dudú
FW	(Brazil) Tupãzinho
FW	(Brazil) Servílio (substituted off)
FW	(Brazil) Rinaldo
Substitutes:
FW	(Brazil) China (substituted on)
Manager:
(Argentina) Alfredo González

GK	(Argentina) Alberto José Poletti
DF	(Argentina) Ramón Aguirre Suárez
DF	(Argentina) Raúl Madero
DF	(Argentina) Oscar Malbernat
MF	(Argentina) Carlos Pachamé
DF	(Argentina) José Hugo Medina
MF	(Argentina) Carlos Bilardo
MF	(Argentina) Eduardo Flores
FW	(Argentina) Felipe Ribaudo
FW	(Argentina) Marcos Conigliaro
FW	(Argentina) Juan Ramón Verón
Manager:
(Argentina) Osvaldo Zubeldía
