= 1969–70 AC Milan season =

Milan Associazione Calcio
1969–70 season
- President: Franco Carraro
- Manager: Nereo Rocco
- Stadium: San Siro
- Serie A: 4th
- Coppa Italia: First round
- European Cup: Round of 16
- Intercontinental Cup: Winner
- Top goalscorer: League: Pierino Prati (12); All: Prati (17)
- Average home league attendance: 43,674
Home colours	Away colours

During the 1969–1970 season Milan Associazione Calcio competed in Serie A, Coppa Italia, European Cup and Intercontinental Cup.

== Summary ==
Nereo Rocco was confirmed as coach at the start of the 1969–70 season. Bruno Mora, Nevio Scala and Kurt Hamrin left Milan. The main signing of the summer was that of Nestor Combin, forward of Torino.

The season began with three matches in the first round of the Coppa Italia, where Milan, in group 3 with Varese, Verona and Como, gets two draws against Varese and Verona and a victory against Como. The four points in the standings are not enough to qualify for the next round, which Varese enters by scoring one goal more than the Rossoneri.

In October 1969, Milan won the Intercontinental Cup, the first in the club's history. In the first leg at San Siro, Milan beat the Argentines of Estudiantes with the score of 3–0, thanks to a brace from Sormani and a goal from Combin. The return match was played in Buenos Aires and was characterized by the highly aggressive play of the Argentine team; to pay the highest price were Prati, who was hit in the back and forced to leave the field after 37 minutes of play, and above all Combin, who left the pitch with the fracture of his nose and cheekbone. The final result of the match is 2–1 for the Argentines, who overturned Rivera's goal with those from Conigliaro and Aguirre Suárez, but the narrow defeat still allows Milan to win the trophy. After the match, the behavior of the Argentine players lead to the life ban of goalkeeper Poletti (subsequently revoked) and the long suspensions of Aguirre Suárez and Manera by the Argentine Federation as well as the imprisonment of the three for 30 days.

In the European Cup, Milan, after eliminating Luxembourg's Avenir Beggen in the round of 32 in September (5–0 at home and 3–0 away), were eliminated in the round of 16 by Dutch side Feyenoord who overturned the 1–0 defeat in the first leg in Milan thanks to the 2–0 obtained in Rotterdam.

In the Serie A, Milan remained permanently in the top positions finished in 4th place with 36 points, nine points behind Scudetto winner Cagliari, five from Inter and two from Juventus: however, this result would be insufficient for the purposes of qualifying for the European Cups given that the "one city, one team" rule of the Inter-Cities Fairs Cup barred access to the Rossoneri in favor of Inter, who preceded Milan in the final league standings.

During the season, AC Milan captain Gianni Rivera was awarded the 1969 Ballon d'Or, thus becoming the first Italian to receive this recognition.

== Squad ==
Note: Flags indicate national team as defined under FIFA eligibility rules; some limited exceptions apply. Players may hold more than one non-FIFA nationality.

Pos.	Nation	Player
GK	ITA	Pierangelo Belli
GK	ITA	Fabio Cudicini
GK	ITA	Villiam Vecchi
DF	ITA	Angelo Anquilletti
DF	ITA	Cesare Cattaneo
DF	ITA	Alberto Grossetti
DF	ITA	Saul Malatrasi
DF	ITA	Luigi Maldera
DF	ITA	Paolo Montanari
DF	ITA	Roberto Rosato
DF	ITA	Nello Santin
DF	GER	Karl-Heinz Schnellinger

Pos.	Nation	Player
MF	ITA	Roberto Casone
MF	ITA	Romano Fogli
MF	ITA	Domenico Fontana
MF	ITA	Giovanni Lodetti
MF	ITA	Gianni Rivera (Captain)
MF	ITA	Giorgio Rognoni
MF	ITA	Giovanni Trapattoni (vice-captain)
FW	ITA	Lino Golin
FW	FRA	Nestor Combin
FW	ITA	Angelo Marchi
FW	ITA	Pierino Prati
FW	ITA	Angelo Benedicto Sormani

== Transfers ==
=== Summer ===
In
Pos.	Name	from	Type
DF	Alberto Grossetti	Catania	loan end
MF	Domenico Fontana	Vicenza	
FW	Nestor Combin	Torino	
FW	Lino Golin	Varese	loan end

Out
Pos.	Name	To	Type
DF	Bruno Baveni	Savona	
DF	Paolo Montanari	Catania	loan end
MF	Nevio Scala	Vicenza	
FW	Kurt Hamrin	Napoli	
FW	Bruno Mora	Parma	
FW	Carlo Petrini	Parma	

== Competitions ==
=== Serie A ===
==== League table ====
Pos	Team	Pld	W	D	L	GF	GA	GD	Pts	Qualification or relegation
2	Internazionale	30	16	9	5	41	19	+22	41	Qualified to Inter-Cities Fairs Cup
3	Juventus	30	15	8	7	43	20	+23	38	Qualified to Inter-Cities Fairs Cup
4	Milan	30	13	10	7	38	24	+14	36	(Note: Milan not qualified to the ICFC consequently to Inter qualification.)
4	Fiorentina	30	15	6	9	40	33	+7	36	Qualified to Inter-Cities Fairs Cup
6	Napoli	30	10	11	9	24	21	+3	31	

Source: Panini

==== Matches ====
17 September 1969 1	Brescia	1–4	Milan	Brescia
	De Paoli 57'	Report	7', 13', 34' (pen.), 43' Rivera	Stadium: Stadio Mario Rigamonti; Attendance: 24,230; Referee: Gonella

21 September 1969 2	Milan	1–0	Bari	Milan
	Combin 28'	Report		Stadium: Stadio San Siro; Attendance: 59,097; Referee: Acernese

28 September 1969 3	Lazio	1–0	Milan	Rome
	Chinaglia 62'	Report		Stadium: Stadio Olimpico; Attendance: 52,308; Referee: Angonese

4 October 1969 4	Milan	2–0	Hellas Verona	Milan
	Sormani 57'; Prati 73'	Report		Stadium: Stadio San Siro; Attendance: 47,487; Referee: Giunti

12 October 1969 5	Palermo	0–0	Milan	Catania
		Report		Stadium: Stadio Cibali; Attendance: 17,565; Referee: D'Agostini

16 October 1969 6	Milan	2–3	Roma	Milan
	Prati 10'; Combin 68'	Report	2', 56' Peiró; 20' Capello	Stadium: Stadio San Siro; Attendance: 46,223; Referee: Monti

10 December 1969 7	Milan	0–0	Bologna	Milan
		Report		Stadium: Stadio San Siro; Attendance: 25,599; Referee: Bernardis

9 November 1969 8	Inter Milan	0–0	Milan	Milan
		Report		Stadium: Stadio San Siro; Attendance: 70,588; Referee: Gonella

16 November 1969 9	Milan	1–0	Napoli	Milan
	Fogli 59'	Report		Stadium: Stadio San Siro; Attendance: 48,187; Referee: Toselli

30 November 1969 10	Sampdoria	1–1	Milan	Genoa
	Cristin 77'	Report	53' Combin	Stadium: Stadio Luigi Ferraris; Attendance: 19,941; Referee: De Marchi

7 December 1969 11	Milan	0–2	Juventus	Milan
		Report	67' Vieri; 78' Zigoni	Stadium: Stadio San Siro; Attendance: 65,513; Referee: Sbardella

14 December 1969 12	Torino	0–1	Milan	Turin
		Report	54' Lodetti	Stadium: Stadio Comunale; Attendance: 25,434; Referee: Angonese

21 December 1969 13	Milan	4–2	Fiorentina	Milan
	Sormani 4' (pen.), 41' (pen.); Superchi 70' (o.g.); Maldera 77'	Report	45' (pen.) Maraschi; 55' Amarildo	Stadium: Stadio San Siro; Attendance: 45,282; Referee: Gonella

28 December 1969 14	Cagliari	1–1	Milan	Cagliari
	Riva 4'	Report	71' Prati	Stadium: Stadio Amsicora; Attendance: 26,339; Referee: D'Agostini

4 January 1970 15	Lanerossi Vicenza	1–0	Milan	Vicenza
	Facchin 80'	Report		Stadium: Stadio Romeo Menti; Attendance: 27,833; Referee: Sbardella

11 January 1970 16	Milan	1–1	Brescia	Milan
	Prati 80'	Report	77' Volpi	Stadium: Stadio San Siro; Attendance: 22,577; Referee: Giunti

18 January 1970 17	Bari	0–5	Milan	Bari
		Report	1', 50', 73', 80' (pen.) Prati; 17' Combin	Stadium: Stadio della Vittoria; Attendance: 41,538; Referee: Lo Bello

25 January 1970 18	Milan	3–0	Lazio	Milan
	Fogli 26'; Sormani 59'; Prati 68'	Report		Stadium: Stadio San Siro; Attendance: 29,754; Referee: De Robbio

1 February 1970 19	Hellas Verona	2–2	Milan	Verona
	Clerici 72'; Sirena 73'	Report	27' Combin; 85' Sormani	Stadium: Stadio Marcantonio Bentegodi; Attendance: 37,688; Referee: Acernese

8 February 1970 20	Milan	1–0	Palermo	Milan
	Rivera 80' (pen.)	Report		Stadium: Stadio San Siro; Attendance: 29,270; Referee: Bernardis

15 February 1970 21	Roma	0–1	Milan	Rome
		Report	89' Rivera	Stadium: Stadio Olimpico; Attendance: 47,126; Referee: Angonese

1 March 1970 22	Bologna	0–1	Milan	Bologna
		Report	9' Prati	Stadium: Stadio Comunale; Attendance: 38,050; Referee: Pieroni

8 March 1970 23	Milan	0–1	Inter Milan	Milan
		Report	80' Corso	Stadium: Stadio San Siro; Attendance: 67,928; Referee: Sbardella

15 March 1970 24	Napoli	1–1	Milan	Naples
	Manservisi 18'	Report	28' Rivera	Stadium: Stadio San Paolo; Attendance: 57,341; Referee: Francescon

22 March 1970 25	Milan	0–0	Sampdoria	Milan
		Report		Stadium: Stadio San Siro; Attendance: 37,173; Referee: D'Agostini

29 March 1970 26	Juventus	3–0	Milan	Turin
	Anastasi 21', 23'; Leonardi 41'	Report		Stadium: Stadio Comunale; Attendance: 44,549; Referee: Angonese

5 April 1970 27	Milan	3–0	Torino	Milan
	Lodetti 23'; Rognoni 75'; Prati 81' (pen.)	Report		Stadium: Stadio San Siro; Attendance: 36,887; Referee: Barbaresco

12 April 1970 28	Fiorentina	4–2	Milan	Florence
	Mariani 5'; Chiarugi 58', 73'; Trapattoni 68' (o.g.)	Report	10' Rognoni; 13' Prati	Stadium: Stadio Comunale; Attendance: 36,682; Referee: Gonella

19 April 1970 29	Milan	0–0	Cagliari	Milan
		Report		Stadium: Stadio San Siro; Attendance: 64,960; Referee: De Marchi

26 April 1970 30	Milan	1–0	Lanerossi Vicenza	Milan
	Rivera 63' (pen.)	Report		Stadium: Stadio San Siro; Attendance: 29,187; Referee: Trinchieri

=== Coppa Italia ===
==== Group 3 ====
8 September 1968 1	Milan	1–1	Varese	Milan
	Prati 66'		82' Nuti	Stadium: Stadio San Siro; Attendance: 22,737; Referee: Michelotti

3 September 1969 2	Hellas Verona	0–0	Milan	Verona
				Stadium: Stadio Marcantonio Bentegodi; Attendance: 31,321; Referee: Bernardis

6 September 1969 3	Como	2–5	Milan	Como
	Magistrelli 1'; Ciclitira 82'		38', 48' Prati; 41' Rivera; 78' Fontana; 80' Combin	Stadium: Stadio Giuseppe Sinigaglia; Attendance: 9,232; Referee: De Marchi

=== European Cup ===
==== Round of 32 ====
10 September 1969 1	Milan	5–0	Avenir Beggen	Milan
	Prati 15', 63'; Rivera 59' (pen.); Rognoni 61'; Combin 79'	Report		Stadium: Stadio San Siro; Attendance: 46,402; Referee: Rusev

24 September 1969 2	Avenir Beggen	0–3	Milan	Luxembourg City
		Report	19' Combin; 73' Sormani; 89' Rivera	Stadium: Stade Josy Barthel; Attendance: 8,000; Referee: Eksztajn

==== Round of 16 ====
12 November 1969 1	Milan	1–0	Feyenoord	Milan
	Combin 9'	Report		Stadium: Stadio San Siro; Attendance: 16,846; Referee: Weyland

26 November 1969 2	Feyenoord	2–0	Milan	Rotterdam
	Jansen 6' van Hanegem 81'	Report		Stadium: De Kuip; Attendance: 67,000; Referee: Campos

=== Intercontinental Cup ===
8 October 1969 1	Milan	3–0	Estudiantes	Milan
	Sormani 8', 71'; Combin 45'	Report		Stadium: Stadio San Siro; Attendance: 60,675; Referee: Machin

22 October 1969 2	Estudiantes	2–1	Milan	Buenos Aires
	Conigliaro 43'; Aguirre Suárez 44'	Report	30' Rivera	Stadium: La Bombonera; Attendance: 45,000; Referee: Massaro

== Statistics ==
=== Squad statistics ===
Competition	Points	Home						Away						Total						GD
Competition	Points	G	W	D	L	Gs	Ga	G	W	D	L	Gs	Ga	G	W	D	L	Gs	Ga	GD
1969-70 Serie A	36	15	8	4	3	19	9	15	5	6	4	19	15	30	13	10	7	38	24	+14
1969-70 Coppa Italia	–	1	1	0	0	5	2	2	0	2	0	1	1	3	1	2	0	6	3	+3
1969-70 European Cup	–	2	2	0	0	6	0	2	1	0	1	3	2	4	3	0	1	9	2	+7
1969 Intercontinental Cup	–	1	1	0	0	3	0	1	0	0	1	1	2	2	1	0	1	4	2	+2
Total	–	19	12	4	3	33	11	20	6	8	6	24	20	39	18	12	9	57	31	+26

=== Players statistics ===
No.	Pos	Nat	Player	Total		Serie A		Coppa Italia		European Cup		Intercontinental Cup	
No.	Pos	Nat	Player	Apps	Goals	Apps	Goals	Apps	Goals	Apps	Goals	Apps	Goals
	DF	(Italy) ITA	Angelo Anquilletti	34	0	26	0	3	0	3	0	2	0
	DF	(Italy) ITA	Cesare Cattaneo	1	0	1	0	0	0	0	0	0	0
	GK	(Italy) ITA	Pierangelo Belli	0	0	0	0	0	0	0	0	0	0
	MF	(Italy) ITA	Roberto Casone	5	0	5	0	0	0	0	0	0	0
	GK	(Italy) ITA	Fabio Cudicini	36	-26	27	-19	3	-3	4	-2	2	-2
	MF	(Italy) ITA	Romano Fogli	25	2	20	2	1	0	2	0	2	0
	MF	(Italy) ITA	Domenico Fontana	10	1	6	0	1	1	3	0	0	0
	FW	(Italy) ITA	Lino Golin	9	0	7	0	0	0	2	0	0	0
	DF	(Italy) ITA	Alberto Grossetti	1	0	1	0	0	0	0	0	0	0
	FW	(France) FRA	Nestor Combin	33	10	25	5	2	1	4	3	2	1
	MF	(Italy) ITA	Giovanni Lodetti	37	2	28	2	3	0	4	0	2	0
	DF	(Italy) ITA	Saul Malatrasi	17	0	12	0	2	0	1	0	2	0
	DF	(Italy) ITA	Luigi Maldera	19	1	15	1	1	0	2	0	1	0
	FW	(Italy) ITA	Angelo Marchi	1	0	1	0	0	0	0	0	0	0
	FW	(Italy) ITA	Pierino Prati	35	17	21	12	3	3	9	2	2	0
	MF	(Italy) ITA	Gianni Rivera	33	12	25	8	3	1	3	2	2	1
	MF	(Italy) ITA	Giorgio Rognoni	30	3	23	2	2	0	3	1	2	0
	DF	(Italy) ITA	Roberto Rosato	33	0	24	0	3	0	4	0	2	0
	DF	(Italy) ITA	Nello Santin	9	0	3	0	3	0	3	0	0	0
	DF	(Germany) GER	Karl-Heinz Schnellinger	35	0	26	0	3	0	4	0	2	0
	FW	(Italy) ITA	Angelo Benedicto Sormani	38	8	29	5	3	0	4	1	2	2
	MF	(Italy) ITA	Giovanni Trapattoni	22	0	20	0	0	0	2	0	0	0
	GK	(Italy) ITA	Villiam Vecchi	4	-5	4	-5	0	0	0	0	0	0

== See also ==
- A.C. Milan

== Bibliography ==
- Almanacco illustrato del Milan, ed: 2, March 2005. Panini.
- Enrico Tosi. La storia del Milan, May 2005. Italia/Italy cid Tosi.
- Milan. Sempre con te, December 2009. Mondadori. 2009. ISBN 978-88-04-59118-4.
