= 1969 Intercontinental Cup =

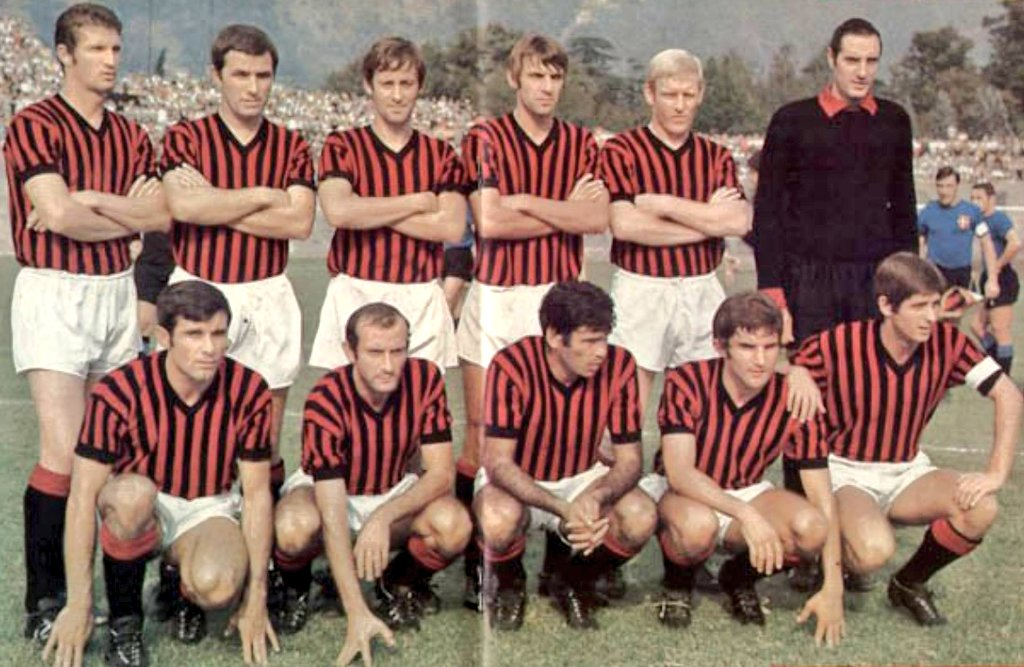
- Milan, champions
- Event: Intercontinental Cup
Milan	Estudiantes (LP)
(Italy)	(Argentina)
4	2
- on aggregate

First leg
Milan	Estudiantes (LP)
3	0
- Date: 8 September 1969
- Venue: San Siro, Milan
- Referee: Roger Machin (France)
- Attendance: 60,675

Second leg
Estudiantes (LP)	Milan
2	1
- Date: 22 October 1969
- Venue: La Bombonera, Buenos Aires
- Referee: Domingo Massaro (Chile)
- Attendance: 45,000

The 1969 Intercontinental Cup was a two-legged association football match contested between 1968–69 European Cup champions Milan and 1969 Copa Libertadores winners Estudiantes de La Plata. It was the 10th edition of the competition.

The first leg was played at the San Siro in Milan, on 8 October 1969. Milan won the home game 3–0. The return leg was held on 22 October, at La Bombonera in Buenos Aires. Despite suffering a 2–1 defeat, Milan won the title on aggregate.

== Violence on pitch ==
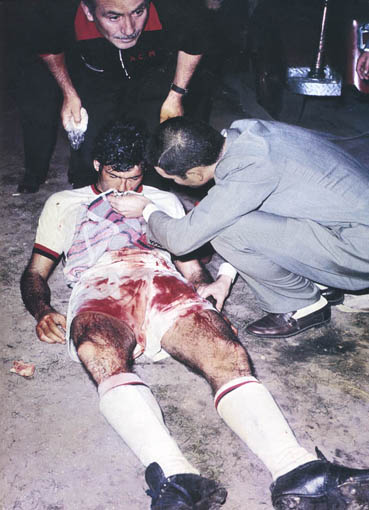
A bleeding Néstor Combin attended by doctors after being stuck in the face by Ramón Aguirre Suárez

Amongst other things, the tie became infamous for the violent on-pitch conduct and dirty tactics employed by Estudiantes' players in the second leg of the fixture.

Estudiantes' players used violence from the beginning, with Alberto Poletti and Ramón Aguirre Suárez throwing balls to a group of Milan players that were practising on the field prior to the match. With the game already in progress, Eduardo Manera pushed around goalkeeper Fabio Cudicini, then he bit Saul Malatrasi. Aguirre Suárez (one of the most violent players) injured Néstor Combin and Pierino Prati, although he would not be expelled until another violent action against Gianni Rivera.

After a match which saw two Italian players badly assaulted, events took a turn for the surreal when stretcher-bound Milan striker Néstor Combin was arrested by Argentine police for draft dodging (Combin had been born in Argentina but had represented France at international level, having moved to Europe for his professional career). The match had immediate political ramifications, partly due to Argentina's bid for the World Cup in 1978. Many of the team's players were arrested and goalkeeper Alberto Poletti, who had punched Milan's "golden boy" playmaker Gianni Rivera, kicked Combin and had clashed with supporters after the match, was handed a life ban. Ramon Aguirre Suárez, who had broken the nose of Combin, was banned from international fixtures for five years. The match is also partly to blame for a subsequent boycott of the tournament by European teams.

No, Estudiantes ... that was not manhood, it was not temperament, it was not spirit... this has been apologetics for brutality and madness ... this has embarrassed us all and those responsible should be ashamed. If we really want to continue believing in something in the future, let's start by repudiating this unfortunate episode.

— Journalist Julio César Pasquato blaming players of Estudiantes for the violence against their rivals

== First leg ==
=== Match details ===
8 October 1969

Milan (Italy)	3–0	(Argentina) Estudiantes (LP)
Sormani 8', 71'; Combin 45'	Report

San Siro, Milan
Attendance: 60,675
Referee: Roger Machin (France)

Milan	Estudiantes (LP)

GK	(Italy) Fabio Cudicini
DF	(Italy) Saul Malatrasi
DF	(Italy) Angelo Anquilletti
DF	(Italy) Roberto Rosato
DF	(West Germany) Karl-Heinz Schnellinger
MF	(Italy) Giovanni Lodetti
MF	(Italy) Gianni Rivera (c)
MF	(Italy) Romano Fogli
FW	(Italy) Angelo Sormani
FW	(France) Néstor Combin	(substituted off) 65'
FW	(Italy) Pierino Prati
Substitutes:
MF	(Italy) Giorgio Rognoni	(substituted on) 65'
Manager:
(Italy) Nereo Rocco

GK	(Argentina) Alberto José Poletti
DF	(Argentina) Ramón Aguirre Suárez
DF	(Argentina) José Hugo Medina
DF	(Argentina) Raúl Madero
DF	(Argentina) Oscar Malbernat (c)
MF	(Argentina) Carlos Bilardo
MF	(Argentina) Néstor Togneri
MF	(Argentina) Juan Miguel Echecopar	(substituted off) 60'
MF	(Argentina) Eduardo Flores
FW	(Argentina) Marcos Conigliaro
FW	(Argentina) Juan Ramón Verón
Substitutes:
MF	(Argentina) Felipe Ribaudo	(substituted on) 60'
Manager:
(Argentina) Osvaldo Zubeldía

== Second leg ==
=== Match details ===
22 October 1969

Estudiantes (LP) (Argentina)	2–1	(Italy) Milan
Conigliaro 43'; Aguirre Suárez 44'	Report	Rivera 30'

La Bombonera, Buenos Aires
Attendance: 45,000
Referee: Domingo Massaro (Chile)

Estudiantes (LP)	Milan

GK	(Argentina) Alberto José Poletti
DF	(Argentina) Eduardo Luján Manera
DF	(Argentina) Ramón Aguirre Suárez
DF	(Argentina) Raúl Madero
DF	(Argentina) Oscar Malbernat (c)
MF	(Argentina) Carlos Bilardo	(substituted off) 55'
MF	(Argentina) Daniel Romeo
MF	(Argentina) Néstor Togneri
FW	(Argentina) Marcos Conigliaro
MF	(Argentina) Juan Taverna
FW	(Argentina) Juan Ramón Verón
Substitutes:
MF	(Argentina) Juan Miguel Echecopar	(substituted on) 55'
Manager:
(Argentina) Osvaldo Zubeldía

GK	(Italy) Fabio Cudicini
DF	(Italy) Saul Malatrasi	(substituted off) 54'
DF	(Italy) Angelo Anquilletti
DF	(Italy) Roberto Rosato
DF	(West Germany) Karl-Heinz Schnellinger
MF	(Italy) Giovanni Lodetti
MF	(Italy) Gianni Rivera (c)
MF	(Italy) Romano Fogli
FW	(Italy) Angelo Sormani
FW	(France) Néstor Combin
FW	(Italy) Pierino Prati	(substituted off) 37'
Substitutes:
DF	(Italy) Luigi Maldera	(substituted on) 54'
MF	(Italy) Giorgio Rognoni	(substituted on) 37'
Manager:
(Italy) Nereo Rocco

== See also ==
- 1968–69 European Cup
- 1969 Copa Libertadores
- A.C. Milan in European football
