= List of Intercontinental Cup goalscorers =

This article lists every club's goalscorers in the Intercontinental Cup.

== Overall top goalscorers ==
Players with at least 3 goals in the Intercontinental Cup
Rank	Player	Team	Goals scored	Matches played	Goal average	Years
1	(Brazil) Pelé	(Brazil) Santos	7	3	2.33	1962, 1963
2	(Ecuador) Alberto Spencer	(Uruguay) Peñarol	6	6	1.00	1960, 1961, 1966
3	(Argentina) Luis Artime	(Uruguay) Nacional	3	2	1.50	1971
3	(Uruguay) José Sasía	(Uruguay) Peñarol	3	3	1.00	1961
3	(Portugal) Santana	(Portugal) Benfica	3	4	0.75	1961, 1962
3	(Italy) Sandro Mazzola	(Italy) Internazionale	3	4	0.75	1964, 1965

== Goalscorers by club ==
=== Ajax ===
Player	Goals	1972	1995
(Netherlands) Johnny Rep	2	2	
(Netherlands) Johan Cruyff	1	1	
(Netherlands) Johan Neeskens	1	1	
Total	4	4	0

=== Argentinos Juniors ===
Player	Goals	1985
(Argentina) José Castro	1	1
(Argentina) Carlos Ereros	1	1
Total	2	2

=== Aston Villa ===
Player	Goals	1982
Total	0	0

=== Atlético Madrid ===
Player	Goals	1974
(Argentina) Rubén Ayala	1	1
(Spain) Javier Irureta	1	1
Total	2	2

=== Atlético Nacional ===
Player	Goals	1989
Total	0	0

=== Barcelona ===
Player	Goals	1992
(Bulgaria) Hristo Stoichkov	1	1
Total	1	1

=== Bayern Munich ===
Player	Goals	1976	2001
(Germany) Jupp Kapellmann	1	1	
(Ghana) Samuel Kuffour	1		1
(Germany) Gerd Müller	1	1	
Total	3	2	1

=== Benfica ===
Player	Goals	1961	1962
(Portugal) Santana	3		3
(Portugal) Eusébio	2	1	1
(Portugal) Mário Coluna	1	1	
Total	6	2	4

=== Boca Juniors ===
Player	Goals	1977	2000	2001	2003
(Argentina) Ernesto Mastrángelo	2	2			
(Argentina) Martín Palermo	2		2		
(Argentina) Matías Donnet	1				1
(Argentina) Darío Felman	1	1			
(Argentina) Jorge Ribolzi	1	1			
(Argentina) Carlos Horacio Salinas	1	1			
Total	8	5	2	0	1

=== Borussia Dortmund ===
Player	Goals	1997
(Germany) Heiko Herrlich	1	1
(Germany) Michael Zorc	1	1
Total	2	2

=== Borussia Mönchengladbach ===
Player	Goals	1977
(Germany) Rainer Bonhof	1	1
(Germany) Wilfried Hannes	1	1
Total	2	2

=== Celtic ===
Player	Goals	1967
(Scotland) Tommy Gemmell	1	1
(Scotland) Billy McNeill	1	1
Total	2	2

=== Colo-Colo ===
Player	Goals	1991
Total	0	0

=== Cruzeiro ===
Player	Goals	1976	1997
Total	0	0	0

=== Estudiantes ===
Player	Goals	1968	1969	1970
(Argentina) Marcos Conigliaro	2	1	1	
(Argentina) Juan Ramón Verón	2			2
(Argentina) Ramón Aguirre Suárez	1		1	
(Argentina) Juan Echecopar	1			1
Total	6	1	2	3

=== Feyenoord ===
Player	Goals	1970
(Sweden) Ove Kindvall	1	1
(Netherlands) Joop van Daele	1	1
(Netherlands) Henk Wery	1	1
Total	3	3

=== Flamengo ===
Player	Goals	1981
(Brazil) Nunes	2	2
(Brazil) Adílio	1	1
Total	3	3

=== Grêmio ===
Player	Goals	1983	1995
(Brazil) Renato Gaúcho	2	2	
Total	2	2	0

=== Hamburger SV ===
Player	Goals	1983
(Germany) Michael Schröder	1	1
Total	1	1

=== Independiente ===
Player	Goals	1964	1965	1972	1973	1974	1984
(Argentina) Agustín Balbuena	1					1	
(Argentina) Ricardo Bochini	1				1		
(Argentina) José Percudani	1						1
(Argentina) Mario Rodríguez	1	1					
(Argentina) Francisco Sá	1			1			
Total	5	1	0	1	1	1	1

=== Internazionale ===
Player	Goals	1964	1965
(Italy) Sandro Mazzola	3	1	2
(Italy) Mario Corso	2	2	
(Spain) Joaquín Peiró	1		1
Total	6	3	3

=== Juventus ===
Player	Goals	1973	1985	1996
(Italy) Alessandro Del Piero	1			1
(Denmark) Michael Laudrup	1		1	
(France) Michel Platini	1		1	
Total	3	0	2	1

=== Liverpool ===
Player	Goals	1981	1984
Total	0	0	0

=== Malmö FF ===
Player	Goals	1979
(Sweden) Ingemar Erlandsson	1	1
Total	1	1

=== Manchester United ===
Player	Goals	1968	1999
(Republic of Ireland) Roy Keane	1		1
(Scotland) Willie Morgan	1	1	
Total	2	1	1

=== Milan ===
Player	Goals	1963	1969	1989	1990	1993	1994	2003
(Brazil) Amarildo	2	2						
(Italy) Bruno Mora	2	2						
(Netherlands) Frank Rijkaard	2				2			
(Italy) Angelo Sormani	2		2					
(Brazil) José Altafini	1	1						
(France) Nestor Combin	1		1					
(Italy) Alberico Evani	1			1				
(Italy) Daniele Massaro	1					1		
(France) Jean-Pierre Papin	1					1		
(Italy) Gianni Rivera	1		1					
(Italy) Giovanni Stroppa	1				1			
(Denmark) Jon Dahl Tomasson	1							1
(Italy) Giovanni Trapattoni	1	1						
Total	17	6	4	1	3	2	0	1

=== Nacional ===
Player	Goals	1971	1980	1988
(Argentina) Luis Artime	3	3		
(Uruguay) Santiago Ostolaza	2			2
(Uruguay) Waldemar Victorino	1		1	
Total	6	3	1	2

=== Nottingham Forest ===
Player	Goals	1980
Total	0	0

=== Olimpia ===
Player	Goals	1979	1990	2002
(Paraguay) Evaristo Isasi	1	1		
(Paraguay) Miguel Michelagnoli	1	1		
(Paraguay) Alicio Solalinde	1	1		
Total	3	3	0	0

=== Once Caldas ===
Player	Goals	2004
Total	0	0

=== Palmeiras ===
Player	Goals	1999
Total	0	0

=== Panathinaikos ===
Player	Goals	1971
(Greece) Totis Filakouris	2	2
Total	2	2

=== Peñarol ===
Player	Goals	1960	1961	1966	1982	1987
(Ecuador) Alberto Spencer	6	1	2	3		
(Uruguay) José Sasía	3		3			
(Peru) Juan Joya	2		2			
(Brazil) Jair	1				1	
(Uruguay) Pedro Rocha	1			1		
(Uruguay) Walkir Silva	1				1	
(Uruguay) Ricardo Viera	1					1
Total	15	1	7	4	2	1

=== Porto ===
Player	Goals	1987	2004
(Portugal) Fernando Gomes	1	1	
(Algeria) Rabah Madjer	1	1	
Total	2	2	0

=== PSV Eindhoven ===
Player	Goals	1988
(Netherlands) Ronald Koeman	1	1
(Brazil) Romário	1	1
Total	2	2

=== Racing ===
Player	Goals	1967
(Argentina) Juan Carlos Cárdenas	2	2
(Argentina) Norberto Raffo	1	1
Total	3	3

=== Real Madrid ===
Player	Goals	1960	1966	1998	2000	2002
(Hungary) Ferenc Puskás	2	2				
(Argentina) Alfredo Di Stéfano	1	1				
(Spain) Chus Herrera	1	1				
(Spain) Francisco Gento	1	1				
(Spain) Guti	1					1
(Spain) Raúl	1			1		
(Brazil) Roberto Carlos	1				1	
(Brazil) Ronaldo	1					1
Own goals	1			1		
Total	10	5	0	2	1	2

=== Red Star Belgrade ===
Player	Goals	1991
(Socialist Federal Republic of Yugoslavia) Vladimir Jugović	2	2
(Socialist Federal Republic of Yugoslavia) Darko Pančev	1	1
Total	3	3

=== River Plate ===
Player	Goals	1986	1996
(Uruguay) Antonio Alzamendi	1	1	
Total	1	1	0

=== Santos ===
Player	Goals	1962	1963
(Brazil) Pelé	7	5	2
(Brazil) Pepe	3	1	2
(Brazil) Coutinho	2	2	
(Brazil) Almir Pernambuquinho	1		1
(Brazil) Dalmo	1		1
(Brazil) Lima	1		1
Total	15	8	7

=== São Paulo ===
Player	Goals	1992	1993
(Brazil) Raí	2	2	
(Brazil) Müller	1		1
(Brazil) Palhinha	1		1
(Brazil) Toninho Cerezo	1		1
Total	5	2	3

=== Steaua București ===
Player	Goals	1986
Total	0	0

=== Vasco da Gama ===
Player	Goals	1998
(Brazil) Juninho	1	1
Total	1	1

Own goals scored for opponents

- (Brazil) Nasa (scored for Real Madrid in 1998)

=== Vélez Sarsfield ===
Player	Goals	1994
(Argentina) Omar Asad	1	1
(Argentina) Roberto Trotta	1	1
Total	2	2
