= Héctor Baley =

Argentine footballer (born 1950)

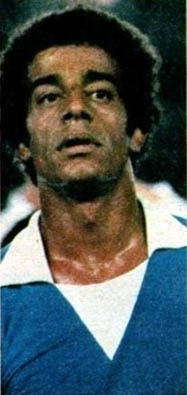
- Baley in 1982

Personal information
- Full name: Héctor Rodolfo Baley
- Date of birth: 16 November 1950 (age 75)
- Place of birth: Bahía Blanca, Argentina
- Position: Goalkeeper

Senior career*
Years	Team	Apps	(Gls)
1968–1971	Estudiantes	3	(0)
1973–1976	Colón	79	(0)
1976–1978	Huracán	112	(0)
1978–1981	Independiente	31	(0)
1981–1987	Talleres	156	(0)
Total		381	(0)

International career
1976–1982	Argentina	13	(0)
Medal record
Representing Argentina
FIFA World Cup
Winner	1978 Argentina
- * Club domestic league appearances and goals

Héctor Rodolfo Baley (born 16 November 1950) is an Argentine former professional footballer who played as a goalkeeper.

Baley was a goalkeeper in Argentina's 1978 FIFA World Cup winning squad and also in the 1982 tournament. Given goalkeeper Ubaldo Fillol's consistent performances, he ended up playing only a few matches for the national team.

Baley was born in Bahía Blanca and raised in nearby Ingeniero White.

Baley is one quarter African origin through his paternal grandfather. He has stated that he was unsure from where, speculating that his grandfather might have come from an English colony in Africa or Senegal.

His career started in the Zubeldía era of Estudiantes de La Plata, where he was one of several goalkeepers who tried to fill in for suspended Alberto Poletti.

In 1978 Baley was part of the Independiente team that won the Nacional championship of 1978.

He also played for Huracán, Colón de Santa Fe, and for Talleres de Córdoba, where he was badly injured during the last game of the 1982–83 season (the game that handed the championship to Estudiantes, the team he started his career with). His replacement in that game was Ángel Comizzo, who made his debut.

== Honours ==
=== Club ===
Estudiantes

- Intercontinental Cup: 1968
- Copa Interamericana: 1968
- Copa Libertadores: 1969, 1970

Independiente

- Primera División: 1978 Nacional

=== International ===
Argentina

- FIFA World Cup: 1978
