= 1969 Copa Interamericana =

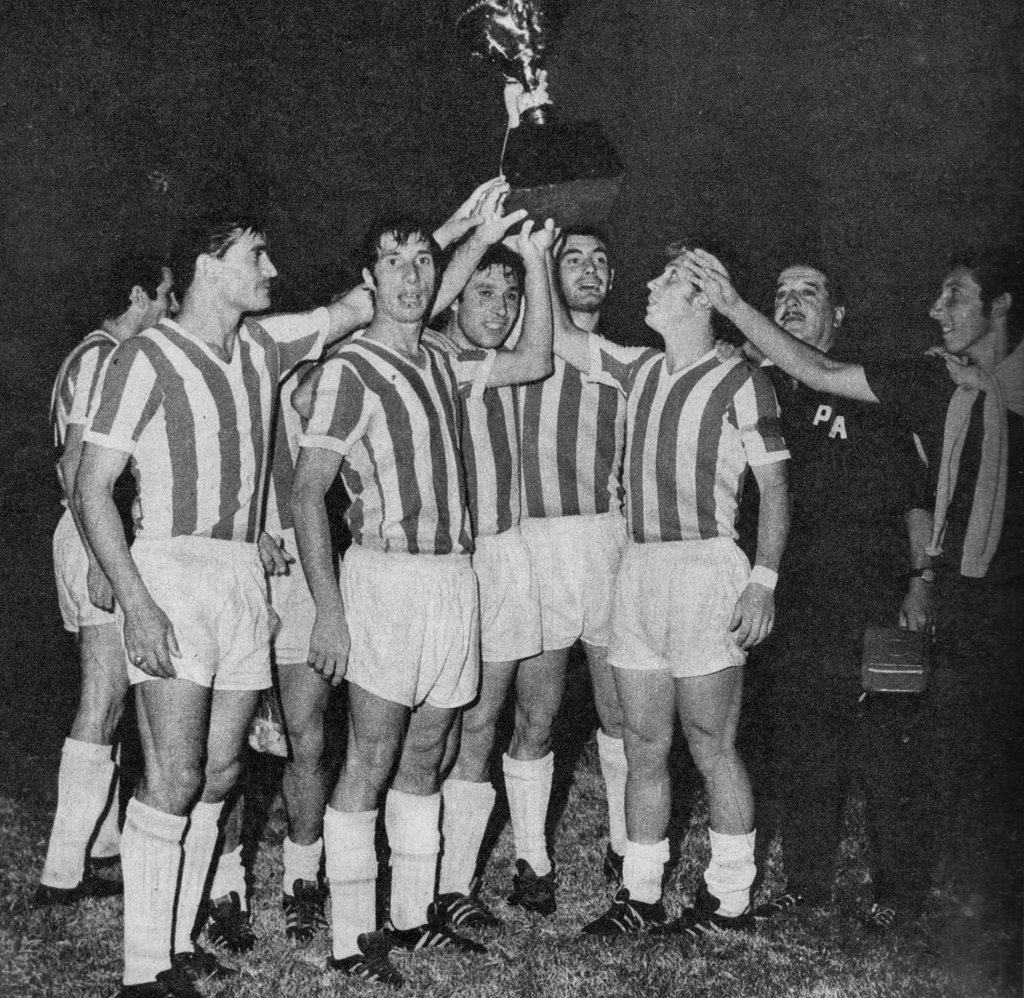
- Estudiantes de La Plata lifting the trophy
- Event: Copa Interamericana
Toluca	Estudiantes de La Plata
(Mexico)	(Argentina)
3	6
- (aggregate score)

First leg
Toluca	Estudiantes de La Plata
1	2
- Date: 13 February 1969
- Venue: Estadio Azteca, Mexico City, Mexico
- Referee: Clemente Ruggero (El Salvador)

Second leg
Estudiantes de La Plata	Toluca
1	2
- Date: 19 February 1969
- Venue: Estadio Estudiantes de la Plata, La Plata, Argentina
- Referee: José Dimas (Paraguay)

Playoff
Estudiantes de La Plata	Toluca
3	0
- Date: 21 February 1969
- Venue: Estadio Centenario, Montevideo, Uruguay
- Referee: Carlos Tejada (Peru)

The 1969 Copa Interamericana was the first edition of the Copa Interamericana, a football cup contested between the winners of the CONCACAF Champions Cup, representing North America, and the Copa Libertadores, representing South America. The cup was contested by Argentine club Estudiantes de La Plata, winners of the 1968 Copa Libertadores, and Mexican club Toluca, winners of the 1968 CONCACAF Champions' Cup. It was played across three games in February 1969.

In the first leg, hosted at Estadio Azteca in Mexico City, Estudiantes defeated Toluca 2–1. Toluca won the second leg by the same score at Estadio Estudiantes de la Plata in La Plata, Argentina, forcing a playoff at Estadio Centenario in Montevideo, Uruguay, where Estudiantes defeated Toluca 3–0 to claim the title. The tournament marked the first time a Mexican club had met a CONMEBOL club in an official competition.

== Background ==
The 1969 Copa Interamericana was the first edition of the Copa Interamericana, an international football cup contested between the winners of the CONCACAF Champions Cup, representing North America, and the Copa Libertadores, representing South America. Estudiantes de La Plata of Argentina qualified by winning the 1968 Copa Libertadores, defeating Brazilian side Palmeiras in the finals. Mexican club Toluca qualified by winning the 1968 CONCACAF Champions' Cup without a final being played, as two semi-finalists, Aurora of Guatemala and Transvaal of Suriname, were disqualified.

Both clubs entered the competition in the midst of successful periods. Toluca had won consecutive league titles in the 1966–67 and 1967–68 Primera División seasons, the top flight of Mexican football, the 1967 and 1968 Campeón de Campeones, an annual super cup contested between the league's seasonal champions, in addition to their CONCACAF Champions' Cup title. Estudiantes had similarly won the 1967 Argentine Primera División, the top flight of Argentine football, before claiming the 1968 Copa Libertadores and subsequently the 1968 Intercontinental Cup against Manchester United.

On 8 February 1969, Toluca held a press luncheon in Mexico City to present the tournament trophy. The trophy, donated by former FIFA vice-president Mordy Maduro of the Curaçao Football Federation, was crafted in silver and adorned with two Aztec tiger heads on its sides. Mexican and Argentine reporters attended the event, with Estudiantes expected to arrive at Mexico City International Airport the following day, accompanied by club president Mariano Mangano.

== Format and venue ==
Copa Interamericana editions were often played with a significant delay following the qualifying tournaments. This was the case for the 1969 edition, with both Estudiantes and Toluca having won the Copa Libertadores and CONCACAF Champions' Cup, respectively, the year prior. The final was played in a two-leg format, with a third playoff match to be held at a neutral venue if the clubs were level on wins, as goal difference was not used to determine advancement.

The first leg was played at the Estadio Azteca in Mexico City, inaugurated three years prior. Toluca were unable to host the match at their home ground, Nemesio Diez Stadium, as the stadium lacked floodlights, necessitating the move to the Estadio Azteca. The venue also offered Toluca the opportunity to showcase the stadium's modern facilities to an international audience, ahead of Mexico's hosting of the 1970 FIFA World Cup. The second leg was hosted by Estudiantes at Estadio Estudiantes de la Plata in La Plata, Argentina. The neutral venue designated for a potential playoff was the Estadio Centenario in Montevideo, Uruguay.

== First leg ==
The first leg was played at the Estadio Azteca on 13 February 1969, in front of approximately 40,000 spectators. The game marked the first official international match played at the stadium. Estudiantes dominated the match, opening the scoring in the first minute through a header from Marcos Conigliaro, before Toluca equalized in the 21st minute through Felipe Ruvalcaba. Estudiantes restored their lead in the 31st minute when Eduardo Flores delivered a cross from midfield that was converted by Carlos Bilardo to make it 2–1, with all three goals coming in the first half.

Flores was the key creative force for Estudiantes throughout the match, serving as the playmaker in midfield and contributing directly to their second goal. Midfielder Carlos Pachamé played a more defensive role, pressuring Toluca's offensive movements. Conigliaro was a consistent threat, exploiting defensive openings in Toluca's backline on several occasions, while wingers Juan Ramón Verón and Felipe Ribaudo had limited impact. Estudiantes were compact defensively, with Ramón Aguirre Suárez, filling in for the injured Hugo Spadaro, tasked with marking Toluca forward Francisco Linares and covering for errors from defender Raúl Madero. Goalkeeper Alberto José Poletti made two saves from efforts by Linares and Vicente Pereda.

Following the match, Bilardo spoke highly of Toluca's offensive resolve, noting that Estudiantes had remained compact to prevent Toluca from building their attacking play. He also addressed the effect of Mexico City's altitude, stating that with more acclimatization time they would have been better prepared.

=== Details ===
13 February 1969
First leg

Toluca (Mexico)	1–2	(Argentina) Estudiantes
Ruvalcaba 21'	Report	Conigliaro 1'; Bilardo 31'

Estadio Azteca, Mexico City, Mexico
Referee: Clemente Ruggero (El Salvador)

Toluca	Estudiantes

GK	(Spain) Florentino López
DF	(Mexico) José Vantolrá
DF	(Mexico) Rogelio Solís
DF	(Brazil) Oreco
DF	(Mexico) Jorge Arévalo
MF	(Mexico) Tomás Reynoso
MF	(Mexico) Felipe Ruvalcaba
MF	(Mexico) Albino Morales
FW	(Mexico) Juan Dosal
FW	(Mexico) Francisco Linares
FW	(Mexico) Vicente Pereda
Manager:
(Mexico) Nacho Trelles

GK	(Argentina) Alberto Poletti
DF	(Argentina) Eduardo Luján Manera
DF	(Argentina) Ramón Aguirre Suárez
DF	(Argentina) Raúl Madero
DF	(Argentina) Oscar Malbernat
MF	(Argentina) Carlos Bilardo
MF	(Argentina) Carlos Pachamé
MF	(Argentina) Eduardo Flores
FW	(Argentina) Felipe Ribaudo	(substituted off) 89'
FW	(Argentina) Marcos Conigliaro
FW	(Argentina) Juan Ramón Verón
Substitutes
FW	(Argentina) Juan Echecopar	(substituted on) 89'
Manager:
(Argentina) Osvaldo Zubeldía

== Second leg ==
The second leg was played at Estadio Estudiantes de la Plata on 19 February 1969. Juan Ramón Verón opened the scoring for Estudiantes in the 17th minute, before Linares equalized for Toluca in the 33rd minute. Albino Morales then gave Toluca the lead in the 77th minute to make it 2–1. With each club having won one leg, a playoff was required to determine the winner.

Estudiantes's defeat was regarded as an upset, having been clear favorites, particularly at home. Toluca outpaced Estudiantes throughout most of the match and maintained momentum. Argentine sports magazine El Gráfico interviewed several Estudiantes members following the match. Coach Osvaldo Zubeldía noted that after returning from Mexico, he had allowed the squad two days off, which he believed affected their preparation. Conigliaro, also interviewed by El Gráfico, suggested that Estudiantes had been overconfident, expecting to defeat Toluca by a large margin.

=== Details ===
19 February 1969
Second leg

Estudiantes (Argentina)	1–2	(Mexico) Toluca
Verón 17'	Report	Linares 33'; Morales 77'

Estadio Estudiantes de la Plata, La Plata, Argentina
Referee: José Dimas (Paraguay)

Estudiantes	Toluca

GK	(Argentina) Alberto Poletti
DF	(Argentina) Eduardo Luján Manera
DF	(Argentina) Ramón Aguirre Suárez
DF	(Argentina) Raúl Madero
DF	(Argentina) Oscar Malbernat
MF	(Argentina) Carlos Bilardo
MF	(Argentina) Carlos Pachamé
MF	(Argentina) Eduardo Flores
FW	(Argentina) Felipe Ribaudo
FW	(Argentina) Marcos Conigliaro
FW	(Argentina) Juan Ramón Verón
Manager:
(Argentina) Osvaldo Zubeldía

GK	(Spain) Florentino López
DF	(Mexico) José Vantolrá
DF	(Mexico) Rogelio Solís
DF	(Brazil) Oreco
DF	(Mexico) Jorge Arévalo
MF	(Mexico) Tomás Reynoso
MF	(Mexico) Jesús Romero Reyes
MF	(Mexico) Albino Morales
FW	(Mexico) Juan Dosal
FW	(Mexico) Francisco Linares
FW	(Mexico) Vicente Pereda
Manager:
(Mexico) Nacho Trelles

== Playoff ==
The playoff was held at Estadio Centenario on 21 February 1969. Estudiantes dominated the match, opening the scoring in the 8th minute through a right-footed shot from Flores. The move began with Madero delivering a left-footed cross from the wing into the penalty area. The ball briefly struck Toluca defender Jorge Arévalo's hand, with the referee signaling a penalty but allowing play to continue under the advantage rule. Flores, arriving from outside the box, struck the ball with his right foot to score despite Rogelio Solís's attempt to clear.

The first half was largely conservative, with both sides playing cautiously; from the 25th to the 40th minute, both teams became disorganized in midfield and several long-range efforts came to nothing. Conigliaro added a second goal for Estudiantes in the 44th minute, just before half-time. The move began with a pass from Ribaudo to Conigliaro, who carried the ball toward Toluca's goal and shot, with the effort striking defender José Vantolrá before rebounding to Conigliaro, who finished with his right foot.

Bilardo was influential in midfield, creating several openings for Estudiantes's attack, pairing with Flores on the offensive, while wingers Verón and Ribaudo complemented the midfield. Toluca's momentum slowed following a foul by Oscar Malbernat on Linares, after which Linares was less effective, with Manera succeeding in limiting Pereda's opportunities and Estudiantes's midfield consistently closing down Toluca's forward play. Ribaudo was reported to have played through a fever. Defensively, Madero helped maintain an organized line, with Zudeldía's strategy centered on contesting every Toluca challenge, compacting the midfield, and looking to counter without conceding chances.

At the start of the second half, Ribaudo had a goal disallowed for offside after narrowly beating Toluca defender Solís to the line. Toluca made a substitution, replacing José Luis Estrada with Tomás Reynoso. A confrontation between players from both sides led to the dismissals of Pachamé and Reynoso. Estudiantes scored a third in the 79th minute when Flores dispossessed Morales in Estudiantes's half and advanced through the pitch before laying the ball off to Verón, who returned it to Flores. Flores crossed to Conigliaro, who controlled the ball with his chest and finished high past goalkeeper Florentino López to seal a 3–0 victory. Following Estudiantes's third goal, Toluca created their only clear chance of the match when Oreco struck a long-range effort from outside the penalty area that Poletti dived to deny. Across all three matches, the aggregate score stood at 6–3 in favor of Estudiantes.

=== Details ===
21 February 1969
Playoff

Estudiantes (Argentina)	3–0	(Mexico) Toluca
Flores 8'; Conigliaro 44', 79'	Report

Estadio Centenario, Montevideo, Uruguay
Referee: Carlos Tejada (Peru)

Estudiantes	Toluca

GK	(Argentina) Alberto Poletti
DF	(Argentina) Eduardo Luján Manera
DF	(Argentina) Ramón Aguirre Suárez
DF	(Argentina) Raúl Madero
DF	(Argentina) Oscar Malbernat
MF	(Argentina) Carlos Bilardo
MF	(Argentina) Carlos Pachamé
MF	(Argentina) Eduardo Flores
FW	(Argentina) Felipe Ribaudo	(substituted off) 75'
FW	(Argentina) Marcos Conigliaro
FW	(Argentina) Juan Ramón Verón
Substitutes:
FW	(Argentina) Juan Echecopar	(substituted on) 75'
Manager:
(Argentina) Osvaldo Zubeldía

GK	(Spain) Florentino López
DF	(Mexico) José Vantolrá
DF	(Mexico) Rogelio Solís
DF	(Brazil) Oreco
DF	(Mexico) Jorge Arévalo
MF	(Mexico) Tomás Reynoso	(substituted off) 45'
MF	(Mexico) Jesús Romero Reyes
MF	(Mexico) Albino Morales
FW	(Mexico) Juan Dosal
FW	(Mexico) Francisco Linares
FW	(Mexico) Vicente Pereda
Substitutes:
FW	(Mexico) José Luis Estrada	(substituted on) 45'
Manager:
(Mexico) Nacho Trelles

== Post-tournament ==
El Gráfico named Conigliaro the player of the tournament, highlighting his determination throughout the competition and noting that despite not being the most physically or technically gifted player, he proved decisive in both the first leg and the playoff. They also reported that Toluca's players appeared visibly fatigued in the playoff game, with the larger dimensions of the Estadio Centenario pitch cited as a factor that limited their ability to press Estudiantes and contest ball disputes. They also noted that Toluca's relative inexperience in international competition may have been a factor in their performance.

Madero commented on the team's performance, describing the second leg in La Plata as a difficult defeat and stating that Estudiantes were the stronger side on a competitive level which ultimately resulted in their victory in the playoff match. Toluca coach Nacho Trelles was reported to have said that his side lacked the composure to compete during the game.

By participating in this cup, Toluca became the first Mexican club to participate in an international competition outside of CONCACAF, the North American football confederation. It was also the first time a Mexican club had participated in an official competition sanctioned by CONMEBOL, the South American football confederation.
