= Juan Verón =

Juan Verón may refer to two former professional Argentinian footballers:

- Juan Ramón Verón (born 1944), nicknamed La Bruja
- Juan Sebastián Verón (born 1975), his son, nicknamed La Brujita
