= Esteban Marino =

Uruguayan football referee (1914–?)

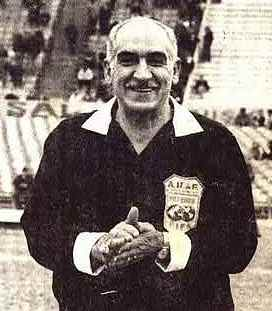
Esteban Marino

Esteban Marino (May 26, 1914 – ?) was a Uruguayan football referee. He refereed in the Primera División de Uruguay.

He is most famous for refereeing the first leg of the 1968 Copa Libertadores finals and one match in the 1954 FIFA World Cup. As a World Cup linesman he oversaw one match in the 1950 World Cup and three matches in 1962.
