= Felipe Ruvalcaba =

Mexican footballer (1941–2019)

Personal information
- Full name: Felipe Ruvalcaba Cisneros
- Date of birth: 16 February 1941
- Place of birth: La Experiencia, Guadalajara, Jalisco, Mexico
- Date of death: 4 September 2019 (aged 78)
- Place of death: Puerto Vallarta, Jalisco, Mexico
- Position: Forward

Senior career*
Years	Team	Apps	(Gls)
- CD Oro
- Toluca

International career
1963–1967	Mexico	21	(1)
- * Club domestic league appearances and goals

Felipe Ruvalcaba Cisneros (16 February 1941 – 4 September 2019) was a Mexican professional football forward who played for Mexico in the 1962 and 1966 FIFA World Cups. He also played for CD Oro and he competed in the men's tournament at the 1964 Summer Olympics.
