= 1968 Intercontinental Cup =

- Event: Intercontinental Cup
| Estudiantes (LP) | Manchester United |
| (Argentina) | (England) |
- Estudiantes won 2–1 on aggregate

First leg
| Estudiantes (LP) | Manchester United |
| 1 | 0 |
- Date: 25 September 1968
- Venue: La Bombonera, Buenos Aires
- Referee: Hugo Sosa Miranda (Paraguay)
- Attendance: 25,134

Second leg
| Manchester United | Estudiantes (LP) |
| 1 | 1 |
- Date: 16 October 1968
- Venue: Old Trafford, Manchester
- Referee: Konstantin Zečević (Yugoslavia)
- Attendance: 63,428

The 1968 Intercontinental Cup was an association football tie held over two legs in 1968 between the winners of the 1967–68 European Cup, Manchester United, and Estudiantes de La Plata, winners of the 1968 Copa Libertadores.

The first leg was held on 25 September 1968 at the Estadio Boca Juniors, as Estudiantes' ground was deemed unsuitable. Nevertheless, Estudiantes won the first leg 1–0, the winning goal awarded to Marcos Conigliaro in the 27th minute.

Old Trafford hosted the return leg three weeks later on 16 October 1968. The match finished up as a 1–1 draw, granting Estudiantes their first Intercontinental Cup title. Juan Ramón Verón opened the scoring in the 6th minute, but Willie Morgan equalised in the 90th minute.

Players were sent off in both legs of the tie, Nobby Stiles being dismissed for Manchester United in the 79th minute of the first leg. The second leg was marred by violence, and resulted in George Best and José Hugo Medina being sent off as a result of a large scuffle towards the end of the match.

== First leg ==
=== Pre-match ===
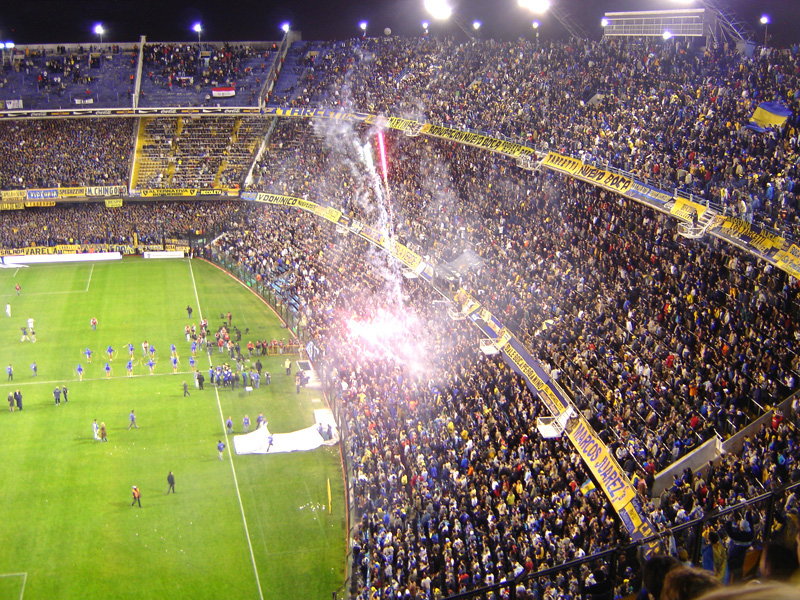
La Bombonera, home of Boca Juniors, was typically used as the home venue for Estudiantes in the Copa Libertadores, under manager Osvaldo Zubeldía

Upon their arrival in Buenos Aires, the Manchester United team might have expected a negative reception from the locals, given the violence that dogged the 1967 Intercontinental Cup between Celtic and Racing Club de Avellaneda. On the contrary, the players were welcomed warmly, with parties and even a polo match organised in their honour. An official reception was organised for the Manchester United team, which manager Matt Busby took his team along to with the intention of establishing good relations with their Argentine counterparts; however, the Estudiantes side pulled out at the last minute, causing Busby much irritation.

Later, an interview with Benfica coach Otto Glória appeared in the press, in which he referred to Manchester United midfielder Nobby Stiles as "an assassin", which Busby found to be in bad taste. An extension of the interview was published in the match programme, with Glória going on to call Stiles "brutal, badly intentioned and a bad sportsman". Stiles had been in the England team that beat Argentina on the way to winning the 1966 World Cup; that match had also been bad-tempered, and England manager Alf Ramsey described the Argentines as "animals" after the game, so the Argentines no doubt viewed Glória's comments about Stiles as fair retribution, though it did nothing to temper the increasingly hostile atmosphere.

=== Match summary ===
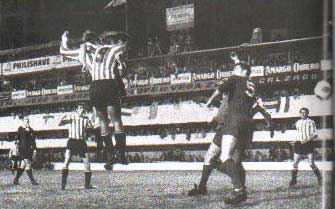
Marcos Conigliaro scored the first goal of the tie in Buenos Aires

Just before kick-off, a bomb that released red smoke was set off inside the stadium, and from that point, the Estudiantes team set about harrying their opposition. A particularly violent member of the Estudiantes side was their midfielder Carlos Bilardo, whose conduct caused Busby to later comment that "holding the ball out there put you in danger of your life". In response to Otto Glória's comments, Nobby Stiles was targeted with particular violence by the Estudiantes players, receiving punches, kicks and headbutts for his trouble, yet each time he walked away without retaliating. However, even the referees seemed to be against Stiles; at one point, the linesman reported Stiles to the referee apparently for simply standing too close to Bilardo. After suffering incessant hounding by the Estudiantes players, Stiles finally retaliated and was immediately sent off in the 79th minute by referee Hugo Sosa Miranda, meaning that he would be suspended for the second leg. Bobby Charlton also suffered a severe head wound and required stitches.

The Estudiantes' players' constant pressure meant that the English side was unable to get into a rhythm, but they put up a resistant defensive effort and conceded only one goal in the game; Néstor Togneri headed home a corner from Felipe Ribaudo in the 27th minute to give Estudiantes the advantage going into the away leg at Old Trafford. However, the referee officially credited Marcos Conigliaro with the Argentinian goal.

=== Match details ===
25 September 1968

| Estudiantes (LP) (Argentina) | 1–0 | (England) Manchester United |
|---|---|---|
| Conigliaro 27' | Report |

Estadio Boca Juniors, Buenos Aires
Attendance: 25,134
Referee: Hugo Sosa Miranda (Paraguay)

| Estudiantes (LP) | Manchester United |

| GK | 1 | (Argentina) Alberto José Poletti |
| DF | 2 | (Argentina) Oscar Malbernat (c) |
| DF | 3 | (Argentina) Ramón Aguirre Suárez |
| DF | 4 | (Argentina) Raúl Madero |
| DF | 5 | (Argentina) José Hugo Medina |
| MF | 6 | (Argentina) Carlos Bilardo |
| MF | 7 | (Argentina) Carlos Pachamé |
| MF | 8 | (Argentina) Néstor Togneri |
| FW | 9 | (Argentina) Felipe Ribaudo |
| FW | 10 | (Argentina) Marcos Conigliaro |
| FW | 11 | (Argentina) Juan Ramón Verón |
Manager:
(Argentina) Osvaldo Zubeldía

| GK | 1 | (England) Alex Stepney |
| RB | 2 | (Republic of Ireland) Tony Dunne |
| LB | 3 | (Scotland) Francis Burns |
| CM | 4 | (Scotland) Paddy Crerand |
| CB | 5 | (England) Bill Foulkes |
| CM | 6 | (England) Nobby Stiles | (red card) 79' |
| OR | 7 | (Scotland) Willie Morgan |
| IR | 8 | (England) David Sadler |
| CF | 9 | (England) Bobby Charlton (c) |
| IL | 10 | (Scotland) Denis Law |
| OL | 11 | (Northern Ireland) George Best |
Manager:
(Scotland) Sir Matt Busby

== Second leg ==
=== Pre-match ===
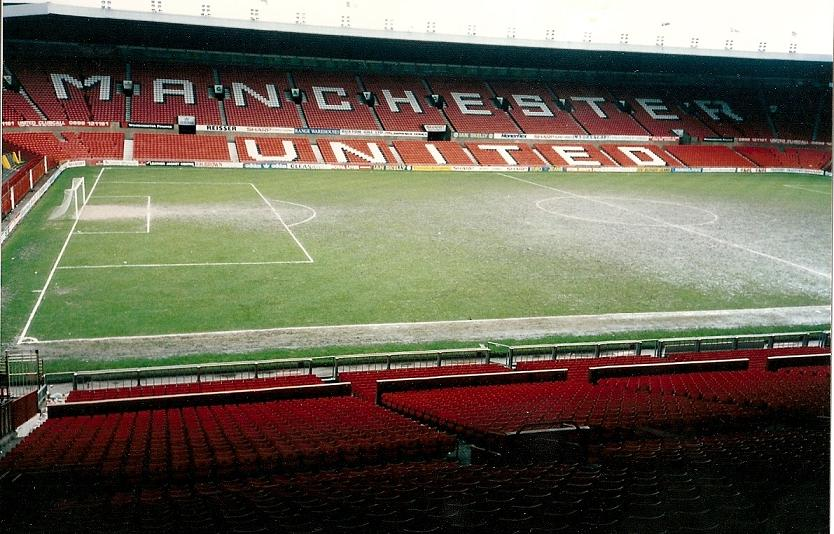
Old Trafford, home of Manchester United and the venue for the second leg

The match was highly publicised around the world. Three hundred Argentine fans made the trip to Manchester to see the match. The match generated over £50,000 (approximately £1.27 million in 2010), a record earning for any English club at the time. The most expensive tickets were priced at £3; the least expensive were at 10 shillings. The home crowd lined up outside the stadium to buy their tickets and waited up to five hours in the heavy rain.

=== Match summary ===
The match started with Manchester United looking for the goal that would level the tie; Paddy Crerand created the first real chance, with a shot from 30 metres out that was defended by Estudiantes goalkeeper Alberto José Poletti. Despite the English pressure, Poletti made several saves, giving his team the confidence to step up their attacks. Estudiantes then surprised the crowd with a sixth-minute goal from Juan Ramón Verón; the goal came from the second free kick of the match, as Raúl Madero crossed for Verón to head the ball in Alex Stepney's net, silencing the crowd.

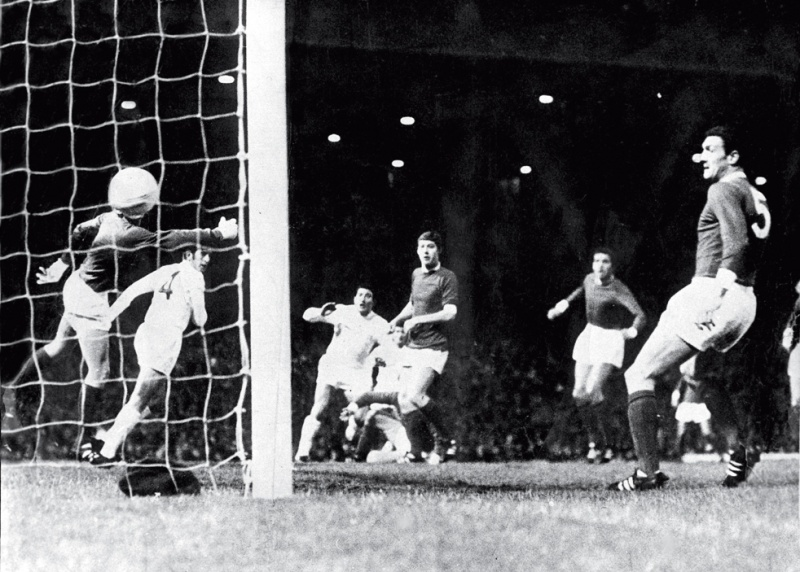
Juan Ramón Verón headed a ball into the United net, which effectively decided the series

Manchester United now needed to score three goals to win and two to force a play-off. George Best forced Poletti into a spectacular save in the 12th minute. Moments later, Willie Morgan shot towards goal, and David Sadler headed the rebound to Bobby Charlton, whose shot was saved by Poletti. Sadler then gave away a free kick in the middle of the pitch for a foul on an Argentine player that forced the European referee to give him a warning. Verón retaliated for his teammate with a foul on Crerand near the English team's penalty area and also received a warning. Best, Crerand and Brian Kidd starting combining with each other to create chances for Denis Law, and although the pressure from the home side forced the Estudiantes players into kicking the ball out of play and blocking any long-range shots, the English side was unable to score.

In the 34th minute, Law lost his marker and created enough space for a shot, only to find Poletti blocking the shot at the edge of the penalty area. Law picked up an injury four minutes later and was taken off the field for treatment, before being substituted by Carlo Sartori just before half-time. While Law was off the field, Estudiantes nearly scored their second goal when Marcos Conigliaro received a pass from Oscar Malbernat and hit the crossbar with Stepney at full stretch. The referee allowed three minutes of injury time before blowing his whistle for half-time.

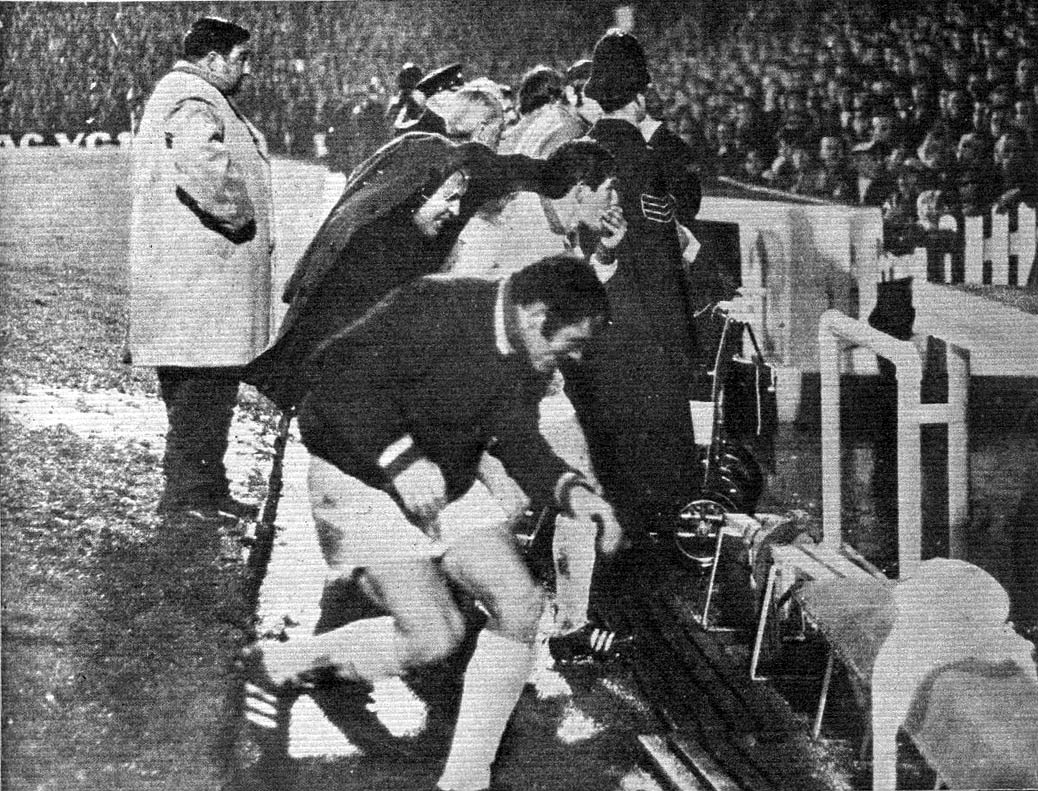
Estudiantes player José Hugo Medina retires from the field while the crowd throw objects at the team

Manchester United had a chance to equalise shortly after the start of the second half, but Kidd hit the crossbar. Estudiantes came out for the second half with a more tactical approach, and started a series of fast counter-attacks; three Estudiantes players took the ball towards the English side of the field, and attempted to pick out Verón with a high pass. However, Tony Dunne was able to intercept the cross and broke up the attack. Although the Estudiantes team continued with their conservative approach to prevent the home side from gathering any momentum, Morgan managed to break through the Argentine defence, but just as José Hugo Medina caught up with him, Morgan elbowed him in the face. Medina grabbed Morgan's jersey and threw him to the ground. The two players clashed again a minute later, and the Yugoslavian referee later gave Medina a warning for a foul on Dunne.

With 17 minutes left to play, Estudiantes brought on Juan Echecopar in place of Felipe Ribaudo. In the 89th minute, Best punched Medina in the face and pushed Néstor Togneri to the ground in the Argentine half of the field. The referee sent off Best and Medina, following which Best spat at Medina, resulting in the two having to be escorted to their respective changing rooms. However, the British crowd prevented Medina from going to his locker room by throwing coins. Manchester United eventually equalised in the 90th minute, when a shot from Morgan beat Poletti. Kidd scored for United in injury time but the referee disallowed it claiming that he had whistled the end of the game before the action and therefore the Argentinian goalkeeper and defenders didn't move to try to prevent the goal. Soon after the whistle, a Manchester player punched a player of Estudiantes in the face while running towards his team's dressing room.

The Estudiantes team attempted to run a lap of honour, but the home fans continued to throw objects onto the pitch, cutting the lap of honour short.

=== Match details ===
16 October 1968

| Manchester United (England) | 1–1 | (Argentina) Estudiantes |
|---|---|---|
| Morgan 90' | Report | Verón 6' |

Old Trafford, Manchester
Attendance: 63,428
Referee: Konstantin Zečević (Yugoslavia)

| Manchester United | Estudiantes (LP) |

| GK | 1 | (England) Alex Stepney |
| RB | 2 | (Republic of Ireland) Shay Brennan |
| LB | 3 | (Republic of Ireland) Tony Dunne |
| CM | 4 | (Scotland) Paddy Crerand |
| CB | 5 | (England) Bill Foulkes |
| CM | 6 | (England) David Sadler |
| OR | 7 | (Scotland) Willie Morgan |
| IR | 8 | (England) Brian Kidd |
| CF | 9 | (England) Bobby Charlton (c) |
| IL | 10 | (Scotland) Denis Law | | (substituted off) 44' |
| OL | 11 | (Northern Ireland) George Best | (red card) 89' |
Substitutes:
| FW | 12 | (Italy) Carlo Sartori | | (substituted on) 44' |
Manager:
(Scotland) Sir Matt Busby

| GK | 1 | (Argentina) Alberto José Poletti |
| DF | 6 | (Argentina) Oscar Malbernat (c) |
| DF | 2 | (Argentina) Ramón Aguirre Suárez |
| DF | 3 | (Argentina) Raúl Madero |
| DF | 17 | (Argentina) José Hugo Medina | (red card) 89' |
| MF | 8 | (Argentina) Carlos Bilardo |
| MF | 5 | (Argentina) Carlos Pachamé |
| MF | 14 | (Argentina) Néstor Togneri |
| FW | 7 | (Argentina) Felipe Ribaudo | | (substituted off) 70' |
| FW | 9 | (Argentina) Marcos Conigliaro |
| FW | 11 | (Argentina) Juan Ramón Verón |
Substitutes:
| FW | | (Argentina) Juan Echecopar | | (substituted on) 70' |
Manager:
(Argentina) Osvaldo Zubeldía

== Aftermath ==
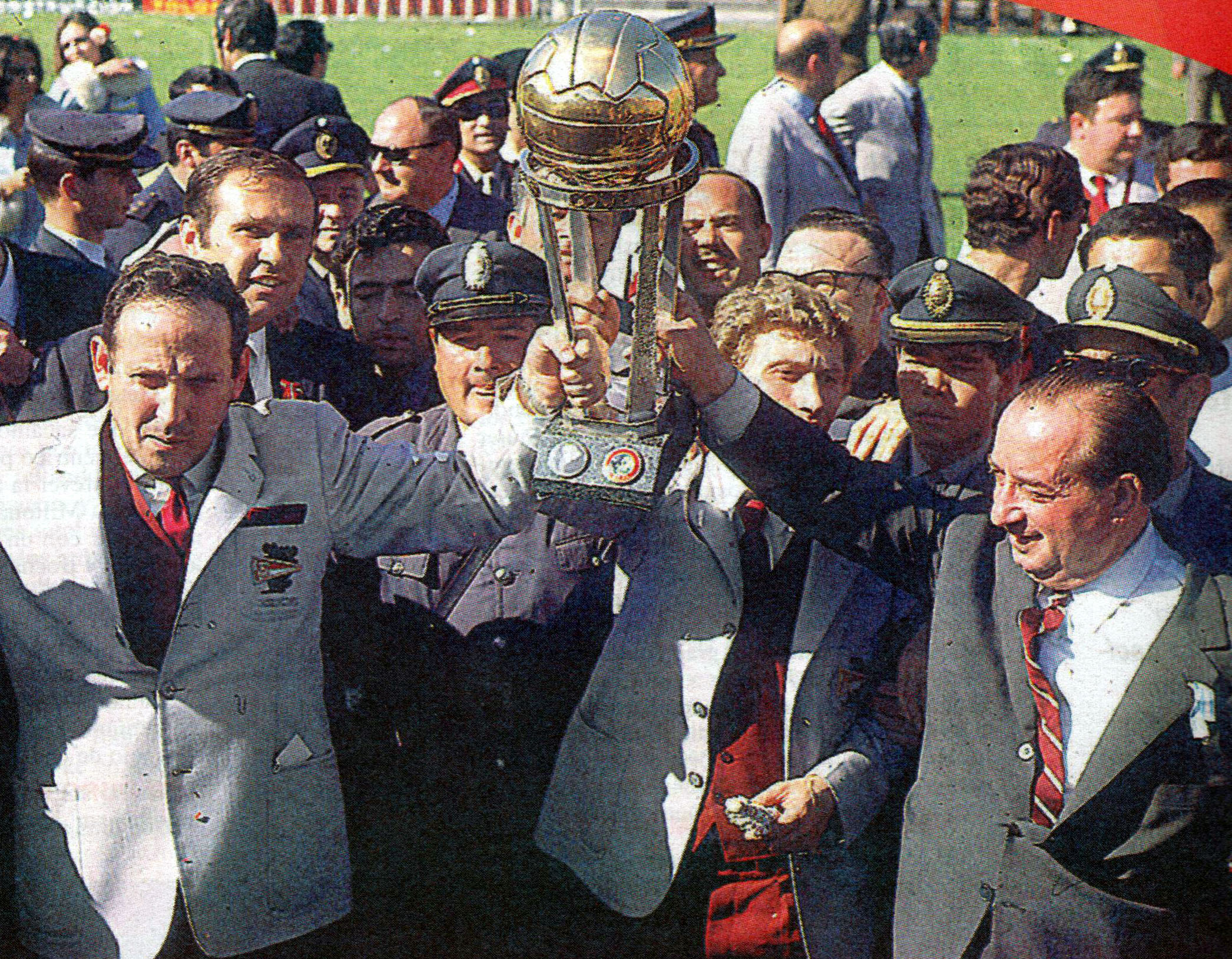
Osvaldo Zubeldía and Mariano Mangano (coach and president of Estudiantes respectively) holding the trophy on their return to Argentina

Estudiantes' victory was acclaimed throughout Argentina, with wide coverage by the local media. Estudiantes was also the first Argentine team to win the Cup as visitor so Racing Club had won the competition one year before but in a neutral venue.

Estudiantes was also the first club out of the big five of Argentine football to win an Intercontinental competition. (Rosario Athletic Club had won the South American Tie Cup at the beginning of the 20th century).

Osvaldo (Zubeldía) taught us that we had to win and it remained engraved in me. He could be practising a corner kick or a free kick for two hours. He stood in the area, raised a hand and said: "the ball must come here" and we should shoot the ball pointing at his hand. The practise did not end until the ball touched his hand.

— Carlos Bilardo in an interview, September 2017

The philosophy of coach Osvaldo Zubeldía (a tactician who introduced some concepts that were revolutionary at that time) would be later continued by player and disciple Carlos Bilardo, winning manager of Estudiantes in the 1980s and then the Argentina national team at the 1986 FIFA World Cup.

== See also ==
- 1968 Copa Libertadores
- 1967–68 European Cup
- Manchester United F.C. in European football
