= Baldocchi =

Brazilian footballer (born 1946)

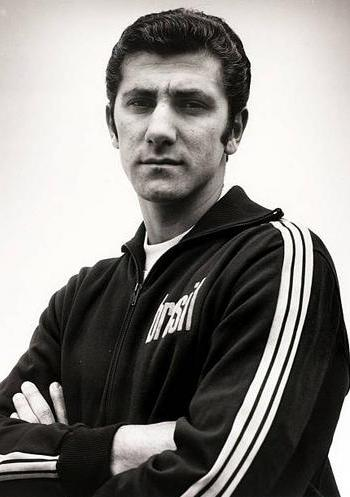
- Baldocchi in 1970

Personal information
- Full name: José Guilherme Baldocchi
- Date of birth: 14 March 1946 (age 80)
- Place of birth: Batatais, Brazil
- Height: 1.89 m (6 ft 2 1/2 in)
- Position: Defender

Senior career*
Years	Team	Apps	(Gls)
1964–1966	Botafogo-SP		
1967–1971	Palmeiras		
1971–1974	Corinthians		
1974–1977	Fortaleza		

International career
1970	Brazil	1	(0)
Medal record
Men's Football
Representing Brazil
FIFA World Cup
Winner	1970 Mexico
- * Club domestic league appearances and goals

José Guilherme Baldocchi (born 14 March 1946), better known as Baldocchi, is a former Brazilian footballer who played as a central defender.

During his club career he played for Batatais (1964–65), Botafogo-SP (1964–67), Palmeiras (1967–72), Corinthians (1971–75) and Fortaleza (1974–77). He won a Brazilian Cup medal in 1967.

He played one international match for the Brazil national football team, on 4 March 1970 against Argentina(in the Estadio Beira-Rio). However, he was included in the Brazil squad for the 1970 FIFA World Cup.

== Honours ==
=== Club ===
Palmeiras

- Série A: 1967 (Taça Brasil), 1967 (Torneio Roberto Gomes Pedrosa), 1969
- Copa Libertadores runner-up: 1968

Fortaleza

- Campeonato Cearense: 1974
- Torneio Início do Ceará: 1977

=== International ===
Brazil

- FIFA World Cup: 1970
