= Saul Malatrasi =

Italian footballer (born 1938)

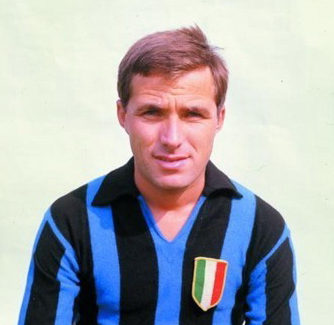
- Malatrasi with Inter Milan

Personal information
- Date of birth: 17 February 1938 (age 88)
- Place of birth: Calto, Kingdom of Italy
- Height: 1.77 m (5 ft 10 in)
- Position: Defender

Senior career*
Years	Team	Apps	(Gls)
1958–1959	SPAL	25	(0)
1959–1963	Fiorentina	78	(1)
1963–1964	Roma	28	(2)
1964–1966	Inter Milan	22	(0)
1966–1967	Lecco	27	(0)
1967–1970	AC Milan	67	(0)
1970–1972	SPAL	55	(0)
1972–1973	Pro Patria	23	(0)

International career
1965–1969	Italy	3	(0)

Managerial career
- 1972–1973: San Felice sul Panaro
- 1973–1975: SPAL (assistant)
- 1975–1976: Legnago Salus
- Roma (youth)
- 1981–1982: Pescara
- * Club domestic league appearances and goals

Saul Malatrasi (Italian pronunciation: [ˈsaul malaˈtraːzi]; born 17 February 1938) is an Italian former football player and coach who played as a defender

== Club career ==
Malatrasi played for 12 seasons (247 games, 3 goals) in the Serie A for Italian clubs SPAL 1907, Fiorentina, Roma, Inter Milan, Lecco and AC Milan, winning at least one trophy for four of these teams (except for SPAL and Lecco). He played for both rival clubs of Milan – Inter Milan and AC Milan – and was part of their European Cup victories in 1964–65 and 1968–69 respectively, thus becoming the first player to participate in the European Cup campaigns of two different winning teams, and the only with two teams of the same city. Malatrasi played in the 1969 final, but not in the 1965 final.

Malatrasi is the only player that have won three Intercontinental Cup in his career.

== International career ==
At international level, Malatrasi earned three caps for the Italy national team between 1965 and 1969.

== Honours ==
Fiorentina

- Coppa Italia: 1960–61
- European Cup Winners' Cup: 1960–61

Roma

- Coppa Italia: 1963–64

Inter

- Serie A: 1964–65, 1965–66
- European Cup: 1964–65
- Intercontinental Cup: 1964, 1965

Milan

- Serie A: 1967–68
- European Cup: 1968–69
- European Cup Winners' Cup: 1967–68
- Intercontinental Cup: 1969
