= Néstor Combin =

French footballer (born 1940)

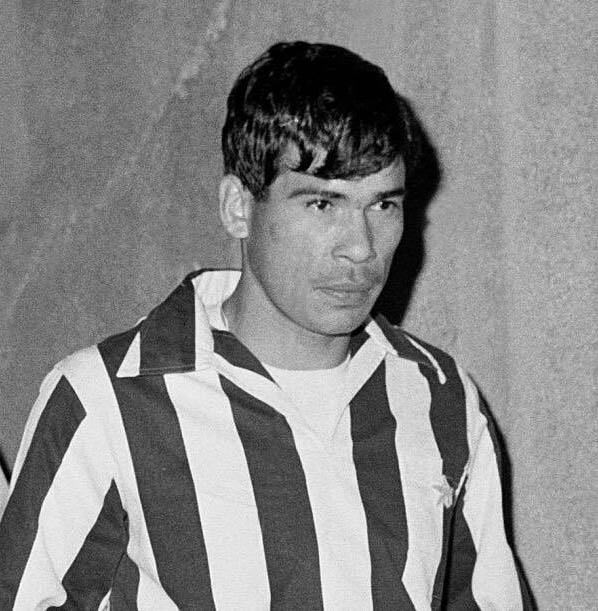
- Combín with Juventus in the 1964–65 season

Personal information
- Date of birth: 29 December 1940 (age 85)
- Place of birth: Las Rosas, Argentina
- Position: Forward

Youth career
- Colón de San Lorenzo

Senior career*
Years	Team	Apps	(Gls)
1959–1964	Lyon	131	(78)
1964–1965	Juventus	24	(7)
1965–1966	Varese	16	(2)
1966–1969	Torino	82	(27)
1969–1971	A.C. Milan	50	(11)
1971–1973	Metz	59	(34)
1973–1975	Red Star	64	(39)
Total		426	(204)

International career
1964–1968	France	8	(4)
- * Club domestic league appearances and goals

Néstor Combin (born 29 December 1940) is a former professional footballer who played as a striker. Born in Argentina, he spent most of his professional career in France, most notably with Lyon, and represented the France national team at the international level. He was dubbed "La Foudre" (The Lightning) in France, for his speed, and "Il Selvaggio" (the Savage) in Italy, for his fighting spirit.

== Club career ==
Combin was born in Las Rosas, Argentina. During his time as a player in France, he scored 117 goals in the Division 1; 68 with Lyon and 49 with Red Star. In the 1973–74 season at Red Star, he formed a remarkable partnership in attack with Paraguayan forward Hugo González. In France, he also played for Metz, and in Italy for Juventus, Varese, Torino, and A.C. Milan. Combin scored 10 goals in 38 games for Juventus and 32 goals in 99 games for Torino.

Combin was one of the first French internationals who played abroad in Italy's Serie A. He won several titles there, including a Coppa Italia with both Juventus and Torino, and an Intercontinental Cup with Milan.

== International career ==
Combin was born in Argentina, and was of French descent through his maternal grandmother. He has eight caps with the France national team, obtained between 1964 and 1968, and scored four goals. He played at the 1966 FIFA World Cup with France.

== Incident ==
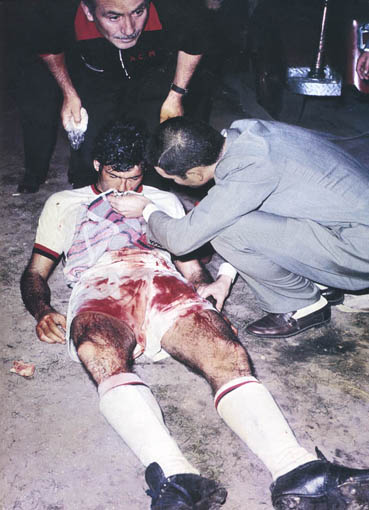
Combín with Milan, after being pummelled during the 1969 Intercontinental Cup's second match vs. Estudiantes.

In a game between A.C. Milan and Argentine side Estudiantes for the 1969 Intercontinental Cup, Combin was dealt with aggressively by rival players and had his nose broken (the infamous "Bombonera Massacre"). When he was leaving the stadium, he was arrested, under a charge of desertion. After international pressure and indignation rising, he was released. In 2015, Raúl Madero blamed Combin as the fighting inciter, by provoking Ramón Aguirre Suárez in the first match, in Italy, saying "negro, don't warm up anymore because in one month I earn the same money that you receive in two years". El Negro was the disparaging nickname given to Suárez, who was of Paraguayan descent and had dark skin.

== Honours ==
Lyon

- Coupe de France: 1963–64

Juventus

- Coppa Italia: 1964–65

Torino

- Coppa Italia: 1967–68

Milan

- Intercontinental Cup: 1969

Individual

- Division 2 top scorer: 1973–74
