= Carlos Pachamé =

Argentine footballer and coach

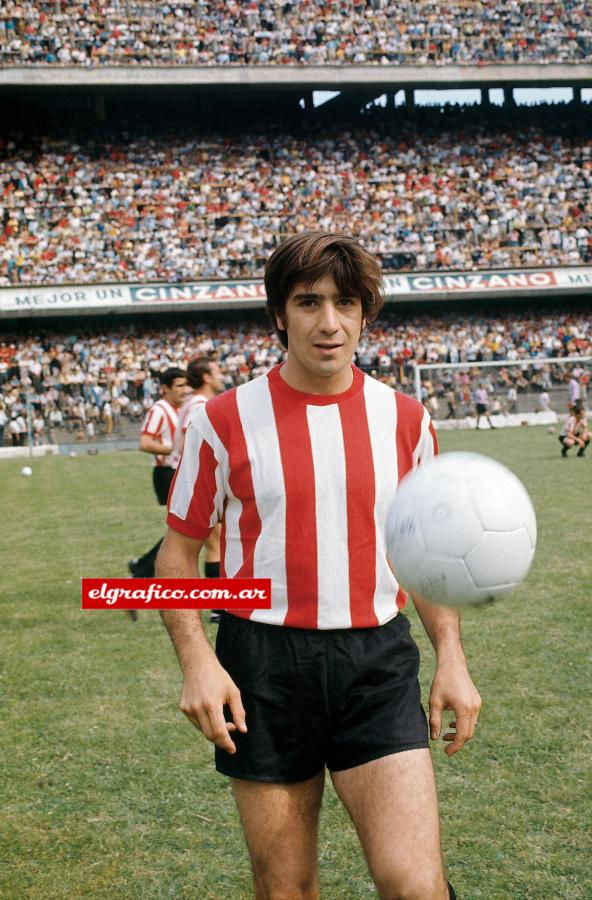
- Pachamé in Estudiantes de La Plata

Personal information
- Full name: Carlos Oscar Pachamé
- Date of birth: 25 February 1944 (age 82)
- Place of birth: Fortín Olavarría, Rivadavia Partido, Argentina
- Height: 1.72 m (5 ft 8 in)
- Position: Midfielder

Senior career*
Years	Team	Apps	(Gls)
1963–1971	Estudiantes (LP)	(see below)	
1972–1973	Boca Juniors	71	(2)
1974–1976	Estudiantes (LP)	273 (total)	(6)
1977	Quilmes	8	(0)
1977	Lanús	35	(1)
1978–1979	Independiente Medellin	?	(0)
1979–1980	Rochester Lancers	3	(0)

International career
1967–1969	Argentina	10	(0)

Managerial career
- 1981: Estudiantes (LP)
- 1982: Temperley
- 1983–1990: Argentina U20
- 1997: Avispa Fukuoka
- 2000-2003: Saudi Arabia U20
- 2003: Estudiantes (BA)
- 2004: Estudiantes (LP)
- 2007-2008: Al-Shabab
- * Club domestic league appearances and goals

Carlos Oscar Pachamé (born 25 February 1944) is an Argentine former football player and coach, who played as a midfielder.

== Playing career ==
As a player, Pachamé was a defensive midfielder for the Estudiantes de La Plata team that won three successive editions of the Copa Libertadores from 1968 to 1970, and the 1968 Copa Intercontinental. In those teams, he formed part of a fearsome midfield, along with Carlos Bilardo and Eduardo Flores.

He also played for the Argentina national team and Boca Juniors. Later in his career he had short spells with Quilmes, Lanús, Independiente Medellin and Rochester Lancers.

== Coaching career ==
After retirement, Pachamé became a coach. Under Pachamé, the Argentina under-20 national team took second place in the 1983 U-20 World Cup. He was an assistant coach, during the tenure of Carlos Bilardo as the coach of the senior national team, when the team won the 1986 FIFA World Cup in Mexico and finished second in the 1990 FIFA World Cup in Italy.

== Managerial statistics ==
Team	From	To	Record				
Team	From	To	G	W	D	L	Win %
Avispa Fukuoka	1997	1997	32	7	0	25	21.88
Total			32	7	0	25	21.88

=== Honours ===
Estudiantes de La Plata

- Argentine Primera: Metropolitano 1967
- Copa Libertadores: 1968, 1969, 1970
- Copa Intercontinental: 1968
- Copa Interamericana: 1969
