= Oscar Malbernat =

Argentine football player and manager (1944–2019)

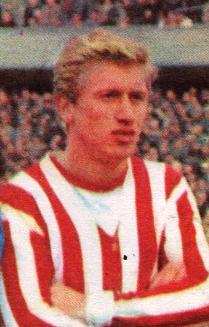
- Malbernat with Estudiantes in 1967

Personal information
- Full name: Oscar Miguel Malbernat Candela
- Date of birth: 2 February 1944
- Place of birth: La Plata, Argentina
- Date of death: 9 August 2019 (aged 75)
- Place of death: La Plata, Argentina
- Position: Defender

Senior career*
Years	Team	Apps	(Gls)
1962–1972	Estudiantes LP	233	(?)
1972	Boca Juniors	18	(0)
1973	Racing Club	?	(?)

International career
1965–1970	Argentina	14	(0)

Managerial career
- 1984: Cerro Porteño
- 1985: Sarmiento Junín
- 1985: Nacional Asunción
- 1986–1988: Estudiantes
- 1989: Deportivo Quito
- 1990: Barcelona SC
- 1991: El Nacional
- 1992: LDU Quito
- 1993: Guaraní
- 1994: Deportivo Quito
- 1995–1996: Provincial Osorno
- 1997–1999: Audax Italiano
- 2000–2001: Cobreloa
- 2002–2003: Estudiantes
- 2004: Universitario
- 2005: Universidad San Martín
- 2006: Deportes Antofagasta
- 2007: Coquimbo Unido
- 2007–2008: Nacional Asunción
- * Club domestic league appearances and goals

Oscar Miguel Cacho Malbernat Candela (2 February 1944 – 9 August 2019) was an Argentine footballer, who was the captain of Estudiantes de La Plata between 1967 and 1972, when the team won a local championship in 1967, three consecutive Copa Libertadores titles (1968 to 1970) and one Intercontinental Cup (1968), where he marked Manchester United's George Best. During one of the 1970 Intercontinental Cup games, he ripped off Joop van Daele's glasses and trampled on them claiming that he was "not allowed to play with glasses".

Before his retirement, he played for Boca Juniors in 1972 and Racing Club de Avellaneda in 1973.

After his career Malbernat would become a manager at various clubs all over South America including his former club Estudiantes on two occasions and other clubs in Paraguay, Ecuador, Chile and Peru. Most recently, Malbernat worked as manager of the youth divisions in Estudiantes.

== Honours ==
=== Player ===
Estudiantes de La Plata

- Primera División Argentina (1): 1967 Metropolitano
- Copa Libertadores (2): 1968, 1970
- Copa Interamericana (1): 1968
- Copa Intercontinental (1): 1968
