= Ramón Aguirre Suárez =

Argentine footballer

Personal information
- Full name: Ramón Alberto Aguirre Suárez
- Date of birth: 18 October 1944
- Place of birth: Tucumán, Argentina
- Date of death: 29 May 2013 (aged 68)
- Position: Defender

Senior career*
Years	Team	Apps	(Gls)
1966–1971	Estudiantes	122	(1)
1971–1974	Granada	80	(0)
1974–1975	Salamanca	3	(0)
1977	Lanús	4	(0)
Total		209	(1)
- * Club domestic league appearances and goals

Ramón Alberto Aguirre Suárez (18 October 1944 – 29 May 2013) was an Argentine footballer who played as a defender. He was mainly known for being a part of the successful Estudiantes de La Plata team of 1967–1970.

== Career ==
Aguirre Suárez made his name in Osvaldo Zubeldía's Estudiantes as an often violent full-back, playing alongside the more refined Raúl Madero. When Estudiantes conquered the 1967 Metropolitano title and was runner-up in the Nacional of the same year, it qualified for the 1968 Copa Libertadores, which it won. Estudiantes then engaged Manchester United F.C. for the 1968 Intercontinental Cup, which it won 2–1 on aggregate.

Estudiantes then proceeded to win the 1969 and 1970 editions of the Libertadores, as well as the 1969 Copa Interamericana in a three-legged final against the reigning CONCACAF title-holders, Mexican club Toluca.

Estudiantes lost the 1969 Intercontinental Cup against A.C. Milan, and the 1970 edition against Feyenoord. Following a violent Intercontinental match against Milan played in Boca's stadium in Buenos Aires, the entire team was arrested on orders from Argentine President Juan Carlos Onganía. Goalkeeper Alberto Poletti was suspended for life (he was later pardoned) and did time in jail. Aguirre Suárez and Manera endured jail time and suspensions. Aguirre Suárez had scored in the match; Milan player Nestor Combin argued that Aguirre Suárez's elbow broke a bone in his face.

After Estudiantes lost the 1971 Copa Libertadores final, several players were transferred. Aguirre Suárez played for Granada CF in 1971/72 and later in 1973/74, conforming a strong defensive line alongside Uruguayan (and former Libertadores foe) Julio Montero Castillo. He also played for UD Salamanca before retiring in 1975.

In 1977, he came out of retirement to play four games for Club Atlético Lanús.

== Honours ==
Estudiantes

- Copa Libertadores (3): 1968, 1969, 1970
- Primera División Argentina (1): Metropolitano 1967
- Copa Intercontinental (1): 1968
- Copa Interamericana (1): 1969

== Post-retirement ==
After retirement, Aguirre Suárez remained linked to football, coaching teams in Tucumán and elsewhere, and working in schools in the La Plata area.
