= Eduardo Flores =

Argentine footballer (1944–2022)

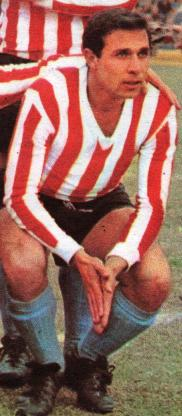
- Flores in 1967

Personal information
- Full name: Eduardo Raúl Flores
- Date of birth: 23 April 1944
- Place of birth: La Plata, Argentina
- Date of death: 20 January 2022 (aged 77)
- Position: Striker

Senior career*
Years	Team	Apps	(Gls)
1962–1971	Estudiantes	164	(65)
1972–1974	Nancy	42	(15)
Total		216	(80)
- * Club domestic league appearances and goals

Eduardo Raúl Flores (23 April 1944 – 20 January 2022), known as Bocha, was an Argentine footballer who played as a striker for Estudiantes de La Plata in Argentina and AS Nancy in France.

== Career ==
Flores started his playing career in 1962 with Estudiantes de La Plata, he went on to make 165 league appearances for the club scoring 65 goals. He was part of Osvaldo Zubeldía's team that won the 1967 Metropolitano championship, followed by three successive Copa Libertadores titles from 1968 to 1970.

Flores missed the 1968 Copa Intercontinental championship win against Manchester United (of the Premier League), but played on the losing side against AC Milan in the 1969 edition and Feyenoord in 1970.

In 1972, Flores joined French team AS Nancy where he played out the remainder of his career.

== Personal life and death ==
Flores died from cancer on 20 January 2022, at the age of 77.

== Honours ==
Estudiantes

- Argentine Primera División: 1967 Metropolitano
- Copa Libertadores: 1968, 1969, 1970
- Copa Interamericana: 1969
