= Domingo Massaro =

Chilean footballer and referee (1927–2025)

Personal information
- Full name: Domingo Massaro Conley
- Date of birth: 28 August 1927
- Place of birth: Iquique, Chile
- Date of death: 6 March 2025 (aged 97)
- Place of death: Santiago, Chile
- Position: Midfielder

Youth career
- Sportiva Italiana

Senior career*
Years	Team	Apps	(Gls)
194? –1952	Sportiva Italiana		
- Audax Italiano

International career
1951	Chile Pan American		
1952	Chile Olympic	1	(0)
Medal record
Men's football
Representing Chile
Pan American Games
Bronze medal – third place	1951 Buenos Aires	Team
- * Club domestic league appearances and goals

Domingo Massaro Conley (28 August 1927 – 6 March 2025) was a Chilean football player and referee who was in Chile's squad for the 1952 Olympic Games.

== Playing career ==
Born in Iquique, Chile, Massaro played for Sportiva Italiana from his hometown in both the 1940s and the 1950s and a few years for Audax Italiano.

At international level, he represented Chile in both the 1951 Pan American Games, winning the bronze medal, and the 1952 Olympic tournament, playing Chile’s only game as they were knocked out in the first round by Egypt.

== Refereeing career ==
Massaro refereed in the Primera División de Chile. He is most famous for refereeing the second leg of the 1968 Copa Libertadores finals.

== Personal life and death ==
Following his retirement from officiating, he began a career at Falabella, a chain of retail stores in Chile.

Massaro died in Santiago on 6 March 2025, at the age of 97.

== Honours ==
Chile B

- Pan American Games Bronze medal: 1951

Individual

- Best amateur football player: 1952
- Illustrious son of Iquique: 2017
