= Néstor Togneri =

Argentine footballer

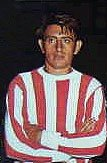

Personal information
- Full name: Néstor Rubén Togneri
- Date of birth: 27 November 1942
- Date of death: 8 December 1999 (aged 57)
- Place of death: San Martín, Buenos Aires province, Argentina
- Positions: Defender; midfielder

Senior career*
Years	Team	Apps	(Gls)
1965–1967	Platense	109	(2)
1968–1975	Estudiantes	261	(5)
1976	Quilmes	46	(0)
Total		416	(7)

International career
	Argentina	?	(?)
- * Club domestic league appearances and goals as of 3 September 2007

Néstor Rubén Togneri (27 November 1942 – 8 December 1999) was an Argentine footballer.

He played mostly for Estudiantes de La Plata (1968–1975) as a central defender or defensive midfielder, and was part of the Argentina national football team that took part at the 1974 FIFA World Cup. Togneri also played for Club Atlético Platense between 1957 (when he made his debut in the junior team) and 1967 and for Club Atlético Quilmes in 1976, where he retired from football.

During his time with Estudiantes the club enjoyed the most successful period in their history. Togneri was part of the team that won three Copa Libertadores, one Copa Intercontinental and one Copa Interamericana.

Togneri died in San Martín, Buenos Aires province, at the age of 57.

== Honours ==
Estudiantes

- Primera División Argentina: Metropolitano 1967
- Copa Libertadores: 1968, 1969, 1970
- Copa Intercontinental: 1968
- Copa Interamericana: 1968
