= Alberto José Poletti =

Argentine footballer

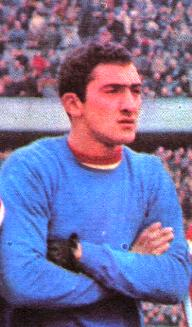
Alberto Poletti in Estudiantes de La Plata

Alberto José Poletti (born 20 July 1946) was an Argentine retired footballer who played as a goalkeeper. He was mainly known for being a part of the successful Estudiantes de La Plata team of 1967–1970. He started his career with Estudiantes in 1965. His last match with them was on 16 December 1970 against Velez Sarsfield. In the 1969 Intercontinental Cup, he received a life ban because of a fight. However, he was pardoned and was able to play again.

In 1971, he moved to Club Atlético Huracán for a season and then played for Olympiakos in Greece between 1972 and 1973, where, due to health problems, he decided to retire from professional football.

== Honours ==
- Argentine Primera División: 1967
- Copa Libertadores: 1968, 1969, 1970
- Intercontinental Cup: 1968
- Copa Interamericana: 1969
