= Juan Ramón Verón =

Argentine footballer and coach (1944–2025)

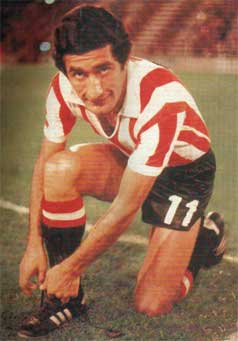
- Verón in 1967

Personal information
- Full name: Juan Ramón Verón
- Date of birth: 17 March 1944
- Place of birth: La Plata, Buenos Aires Province, Argentina
- Date of death: 27 May 2025 (aged 81)
- Place of death: La Plata, Buenos Aires Province, Argentina
- Height: 1.75 m (5 ft 9 in)
- Positions: Midfielder; forward

Senior career*
Years	Team	Apps	(Gls)
1962–1972	Estudiantes	295	(77)
1972–1975	Panathinaikos	57	(22)
1975	Estudiantes		
1976–1977	Atlético Junior		
1978–1979	Cúcuta Deportivo		
1980–1981	Estudiantes		
1985	Juventud Unida		

International career
1968–1971	Argentina	4	(0)
- * Club domestic league appearances and goals

Juan Ramón Verón (Spanish pronunciation: [ˈxwan raˈmom beˈɾon]; 17 March 1944 – 27 May 2025) was an Argentine footballer. He played as a midfielder or forward most notably for Estudiantes, where he won three consecutive Copa Libertadores titles. He was the father of former player Juan Sebastián Verón.

== Career ==
=== Estudiantes ===
Nicknamed La Bruja [la ˈβɾuxa] (English: The Witch), Verón was born in La Plata. He was capable of playing both as a midfielder and as a striker, and was renowned for his technical skills, ability with the ball at his feet and his goal-scoring prowess. He played for Estudiantes de La Plata, who were a dominant force in Argentine football during the late 1960s.

Among the memorable goals he scored are his "bicycle kick" goal against Racing Club, his header in the Intercontinental Cup championship against Manchester United and, most famously, his glorious hat-trick against Brazil's Palmeiras in the finals of the 1968 Copa Libertadores.

=== Later years ===
Known as one of Estudiantes' all-time great players, he moved on to play for Panathinaikos of Athens, Greece in 1972. After a successful 2 1/2 seasons he returned to his beloved Estudiantes in 1975.

In 1976, he moved to Colombia where he played for Atlético Junior where he helped the team to win the 1977 Colombian title and then Cúcuta Deportivo before returning to his home club in 1980.

== After retirement ==
After retiring, he had a brief career as coach in Central America and worked as a special advisor for Estudiantes.

== Personal life and death ==
His son Juan Sebastián Verón, nicknamed La Brujita (The Little Witch), is also a footballer who played for Estudiantes before moving to European football. In 2006, he returned to Estudiantes, captaining them to their first title in 23 years in the Apertura 2006 and won the fourth Estudiantes title in Libertadores da América tournament in 2008, and then came out of retirement to play for Estudiantes once again in 2017.

Juan Ramón died on 27 May 2025, at the age of 81.

== Honours ==
Estudiantes

- Primera División Argentina: Metropolitano 1967
- Copa Libertadores: 1968, 1969, 1970
- Intercontinental Cup: 1968
- Copa Interamericana: 1969

Atlético Junior

- Colombian League: 1977
