= 1967 Argentine Primera División =

76th season of top-tier football league in Argentina

Primera División
- Season: 1967
- Dates: 3 March – 23 December
- Champions: Estudiantes (LP) (Metropolitano); Independiente (Nacional)
- 1968 Copa Libertadores: Independiente; Estudiantes (LP)

The 1967 Primera División season was the 76th season of top-flight football in Argentina. It was the first season in which the Metropolitano and Nacional championships format was used.

Estudiantes (LP) (2nd title) won the Metropolitano while Independiente won the Nacional tournament (8th title). At the end of the Reclasificatorio, Unión de Santa Fe and Deportivo Español were relegated.

== Campeonato Metropolitano ==
Metropolitano
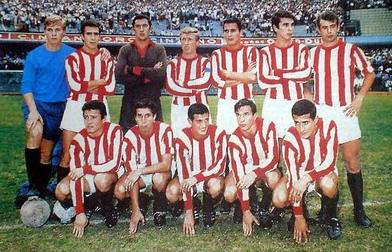
- Estudiantes LP, Metropolitano champions
- Season: 1967
- Dates: 3 March – 23 December
- Champions: Estudiantes (LP) (2nd title)
- Promoted: Deportivo Español; Unión (SF)
- Relegated: Deportivo Español; Unión (SF)
- Top goalscorer: (Paraguay) Bernardo Acosta (18)

The "Campeonato Metropolitano" was the first championship of the season. It was contested between twenty-two teams directed affiliated with the Argentine Football Association from March 3 to August 6.

The format championship was in two rounds. The first round saw the 22 teams divided into two groups of 11. They would play within that group in a double round-robin format. In addition, they would play one team in the other group twice (the other team typically being a traditional rival). The top two teams in each group would advance to the semifinals and qualify for the Campeonato Nacional, the next four teams would qualify to the Campeonato Nacional, the next two teams would go to the Promocional tournament, and the bottom three teams would go to the Reclasificatorio. The four teams qualified to the semifinals would then compete in a one leg, single elimination tournament.

Estudiantes de La Plata won the Metropolitano under the leadership of Osvaldo Zubeldía. It was their second Primera División. Paraguayan Bernardo Acosta of Lanús finished as the top goalscorer with 18 goals.

=== Classification round ===
==== Group A ====
Pos	Team	Pld	W	D	L	GF	GA	GD	Pts	Qualification
1	Racing	22	10	9	3	30	16	+14	29	Advanced to the Semifinals & Qualified to the Campeonato Nacional
2	Estudiantes (LP)	22	11	7	4	24	15	+9	29	Advanced to the Semifinals & Qualified to the Campeonato Nacional
3	Vélez Sársfield	22	10	7	5	35	22	+13	27	Qualified to the Campeonato Nacional
4	Boca Juniors	22	8	10	4	29	20	+9	26	Qualified to the Campeonato Nacional
5	Lanús	22	7	8	7	40	29	+11	22	Qualified to the Campeonato Nacional
6	Quilmes	22	6	9	7	27	32	−5	21	Qualified to the Campeonato Nacional
7	Huracán	22	5	10	7	30	34	−4	20	To the Promocional
8	Colón	22	3	13	6	17	23	−6	19	To the Promocional
9	Newell's Old Boys	22	5	7	10	22	27	−5	17	To the Reclasificatorio
10	Argentinos Juniors	22	4	7	11	21	43	−22	15	To the Reclasificatorio
11	Atlanta	22	3	8	11	23	35	−12	14	To the Reclasificatorio

==== Group B ====
Pos	Team	Pld	W	D	L	GF	GA	GD	Pts	Qualification
1	Platense	22	13	2	7	40	28	+12	28	Advanced to the Semifinals & Qualified to the Campeonato Nacional
2	Independiente	22	10	7	5	33	15	+18	27	Advanced to the Semifinals & Qualified to the Campeonato Nacional
3	Rosario Central	22	9	8	5	24	22	+2	26	Qualified to the Campeonato Nacional
4	San Lorenzo	22	10	5	7	32	27	+5	25	Qualified to the Campeonato Nacional
5	Ferro Carril Oeste	22	9	6	7	23	21	+2	24	Qualified to the Campeonato Nacional
6	River Plate	22	9	5	8	31	23	+8	23	Qualified to the Campeonato Nacional
7	Gimnasia y Esgrima (LP)	22	8	5	9	25	32	−7	21	To the Promocional
8	Banfield	22	6	8	8	21	22	−1	20	To the Promocional
8	Unión	22	5	10	7	21	25	−4	20	To the Reclasificatorio
10	Deportivo Español	22	5	6	11	20	36	−16	16	To the Reclasificatorio
11	Chacarita Juniors	22	4	7	11	26	47	−21	15	To the Reclasificatorio

=== Semifinals ===
August 3

Estudiantes (LP)	4–3	Platense

Boca Juniors Stadium, Buenos Aires

August 4

Racing	2–0	Independiente

Racing Stadium, Avellaneda

=== Final ===
Date	Team 1	Team 2	Res.	Venue	City
6 August	Estudiantes (LP)	Racing	3–0	San Lorenzo Stadium	Buenos Aires

=== Torneo Reclasificatorio ===
The "Reclasificatorio" was a promotion and relegation tournament between the bottom six teams from the Campeonato Metropolitano (teams qualified 9th, 10th and 11th in each zone) and the top four teams from the Primera B), playing in a double round-robin system. It ran from 11 August to 23 December.

At the end of the Reclasificatorio, the top six teams would stay/be promoted in Primera División, while the bottom four teams would remain/be relegated to Primera B. This tournament was won by Newell's Old Boys but did award an official title. Book AFA 1967.

Pos	Team	Pld	W	D	L	GF	GA	GD	Pts	Promotion or relegation
1	Newell's Old Boys	18	8	7	3	20	12	+8	23	Remained in Primera División
2	Atlanta	18	9	4	5	27	14	+13	22	Remained in Primera División
3	Tigre	18	6	8	4	15	12	+3	20	Promoted to the Primera División
4	Los Andes	18	6	7	5	20	16	+4	19	Promoted to the Primera División
4	Chacarita Juniors	18	6	7	5	18	16	+2	19	Remained in Primera División
6	Argentinos Juniors	18	7	4	7	21	24	−3	18	Remained in Primera División
7	Almagro	18	5	7	6	20	24	−4	17	Remained in Primera B
7	Unión	18	6	5	7	17	20	−3	17	Relegated to Primera B
9	Deportivo Español	18	5	5	8	15	21	−6	15	Relegated to Primera B
10	Defensores de Belgrano	18	3	4	11	9	23	−14	10	Remained in Primera B

=== Torneo Promocional ===
The "Torneo Promocional" was an extra tournament played between four teams from the Campeonato Metropolitano (qualified 7th. and 8th. in each zone) and the four runners-up of Torneo Regional. This competition run from 10 September to 10 December and was won by Gimnasia y Esgrima de La Plata, but did award an official title. Book AFA 1967.

Pos	Team	Pld	W	D	L	GF	GA	GD	Pts
1	Gimnasia y Esgrima (LP)	14	10	2	2	35	11	+24	22
2	Huracán	14	9	3	2	36	15	+21	21
3	Colón	14	6	6	2	23	17	+6	18
4	Banfield	14	7	3	4	37	18	+19	17
5	Sportivo Guzmán	14	4	5	5	20	24	−4	13
6	Racing (C)	14	3	2	9	16	30	−14	8
6	Olimpo	14	3	2	9	17	39	−22	8
8	Atlético Juventud	14	2	1	11	18	48	−30	5

=== Top scorers ===
Rank.	Player	Team	Goals
1	(Paraguay) Bernardo Acosta	Lanús	18
2	(Argentina) Juan Carlos Carone	Vélez Sarsfield	17
3	(Argentina) Aníbal Tarabini	Independiente	16

== Campeonato Nacional ==
Nacional
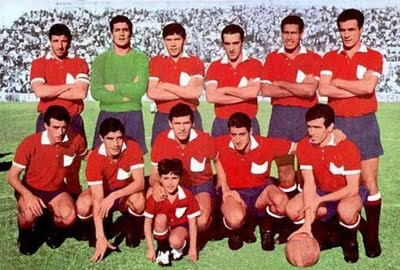
- Independiente, Nacional champion
- Season: 1967
- Dates: 8 September – 17 December
- Champions: Independiente (8th title)
- 1968 Copa Libertadores: Independiente; Estudiantes (LP)
- Top goalscorer: (Argentina) Luis Artime (11)

The 1967 Campeonato Nacional was the second and last championship of the season. It was played between September 8 to December 17.

The format for the Nacional was a single round-robin tournament. The team with the highest points at the end would be the champion. The champion and runner-up would qualify to the 1968 Copa Libertadores. Sixteen teams played in the Nacional: twelve qualified from the Metropolitano, and four qualified from the Regional Tournament. They are: San Martín (Mendoza), San Lorenzo (Mar del Plata), Central Córdoba (Santiago del Estero) and Chaco For Ever.

Independiente won the Campeonato Nacional achieving their 8th league title. They were managed by Osvaldo Brandão and their own Luis Artime was the top goalscorer with 11 goals.

=== Standings ===
Pos	Team	Pld	W	D	L	GF	GA	GD	Pts
1	Independiente	15	12	2	1	43	14	+29	26
2	Estudiantes (LP)	15	9	6	0	19	8	+11	24
3	Vélez Sarsfield	15	8	4	3	28	14	+14	20
3	Rosario Central	15	8	4	3	26	13	+13	20
5	River Plate	15	9	1	5	33	15	+18	19
6	San Lorenzo	15	7	4	4	32	15	+17	18
7	Lanús	15	8	0	7	23	26	−3	16
7	Boca Juniors	15	6	4	5	21	20	+1	16
9	Ferro Carril Oeste	15	5	5	5	21	22	−1	15
9	Platense	15	5	5	5	19	20	−1	15
11	Quilmes	15	5	3	7	16	19	−3	13
11	San Martín (M)	15	3	4	8	17	31	−14	10
13	Racing	15	2	6	7	11	23	−12	10
14	Central Córdoba (SdE)	15	2	5	8	11	25	−14	9
15	San Lorenzo (MdP)	15	1	4	10	11	33	−22	6
16	Chaco For Ever	15	1	1	13	11	44	−33	3

=== Top scorers ===
Rank.	Player	Team	Goals
1	(Argentina) Luis Artime	Independiente	11
2	(Argentina) Héctor Yazalde	Independiente	10
3	(Argentina) Oscar Más	River Plate	9
3	(Argentina) Héctor Veira	San Lorenzo	9
