= Osvaldo Zubeldía =

Argentine footballer and coach

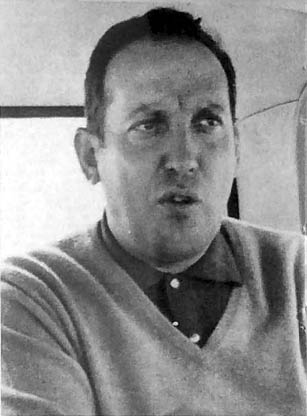
- Zubeldía in 1968

Personal information
- Full name: Osvaldo Juan Zubeldía
- Date of birth: 24 June 1927
- Place of birth: Junín, Argentina
- Date of death: 17 January 1982 (aged 54)
- Position: Striker

Senior career*
Years	Team	Apps	(Gls)
1949–1955	Vélez Sársfield	?	(?)
1956–1957	Boca Juniors	38	(10)
1958–1959	Atlanta	?	(6)
1960	Banfield	?	(?)

International career
- Argentina

Managerial career
- 1961–1963: Atlanta
- 1965: Argentina
- 1965–1970: Estudiantes de La Plata
- 1974: San Lorenzo
- 1975: Racing Club
- 1976–1982: Atlético Nacional
- * Club domestic league appearances and goals as of 5 September 2007

Osvaldo Juan Zubeldía (24 June 1927 – 17 January 1982) was an Argentine football player and coach.

== Playing career ==
Zubeldía played for Vélez Sarsfield, Boca Juniors, Atlanta and Banfield, and also represented the Argentina national football team. He was regarded as an intelligent player with good positional sense. He became better known, however, for his managerial career.

== Managerial career ==
=== Early career ===
His managing career started at Atlanta between 1961 and 1963, he led the team to two respectable finishes in the league. He then had an unsuccessful stint on the managing team of the Argentina national team in 1965.

=== Estudiantes ===
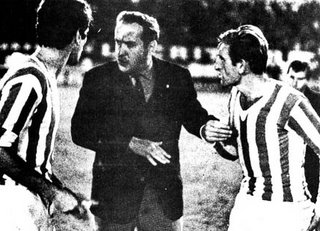
Zubeldía instructing his Estudiantes players

His managerial career took off with Estudiantes de La Plata. He was hired by the club in 1965 to help the team stave off relegation; he combined many prospects from Estudiantes' la tercera que mata ("the killer juveniles") with a small number of outside talent, and built one of the most successful teams in the history of Argentine football.

The first championship of the so-called "Golden Era" came in 1967, when Estudiantes became the first "small" team to win an Argentine championship. The team came back from three goals down to beat Platense in the semifinal 4–3, then took the crown with a convincing 3–0 victory over Racing Club.

Estudiantes then took second place in the Nacional championship, qualifying for the 1968 Copa Libertadores, which Estudiantes won after defeating Brazilian side Palmeiras.

In that year's Intercontinental Cup, Estudiantes defeated Bobby Charlton's Manchester United 1–0 in Buenos Aires, and achieved a 1–1 tie at Old Trafford on 16 October 1968. The Intercontinental title remains the highest achievement in Estudiantes' history.

The team would go on to win the Copa Libertadores twice more, in 1969 against Nacional from Uruguay and in 1970 against Peñarol also from Uruguay.

Estudiantes lost their Intercontinental Cup finals to A.C. Milan and Feyenoord, respectively, but they did win the less prestigious Copa Interamericana in 1969.

=== 1974–1982 ===
In 1974, Zubeldía coached the San Lorenzo de Almagro team that won the Nacional title. He also won two Colombian League titles with Atlético Nacional in 1976 and 1981.

On 17 January 1982 Zubeldía died of a heart attack in Medellín, Colombia at the age of 54, while setting a bet on a horse race.

== Legacy ==
Zubeldía's legacy was carried to fruition by the key tactical player of his Estudiantes, Carlos Bilardo, who went on to become one of the most successful coaches in Argentine history. Bilardo dedicated to his mentor both the 1982 Metropolitano title won by Estudiantes and the 1986 FIFA World Cup title won by Argentina.
