= 1971 Copa Interamericana =

- Event: Copa Interamericana
Cruz Azul	Nacional
(Mexico)	(Uruguay)
2	3
- (on aggregate)

First leg
Cruz Azul	Nacional
1	1
- Date: July 15, 1972
- Venue: Estadio Azteca, Mexico City
- Referee: Marco A. Regalado (Guatemala)

Second leg
Nacional	Cruz Azul
2	1
- Date: November 7, 1972
- Venue: Estadio Centenario, Montevideo
- Referee: Mario Canessa (Colombia)

The 1971 Copa Interamericana was the 2nd staging of the competition. The final took place between Nacional (Winners of 1971 Copa Libertadores) and Cruz Azul (Winners of the 1971 CONCACAF Champions' Cup) and was staged over two legs on 15 July and 7 November 1972.

Since the winning of 1971 Copa Libertadores, some players of Nacional had been transferred, such as Atilio Ancheta, striker Luis Artime and Juan Mujica. Instead of acquiring new players from other clubs, Nacional chose to promote players from the youth divisions to play the series v Cruz Azul. Some of them were Walter Mantegazza, Braulio Castro, Eduardo Gerolami, and Ruben Suárez.

On the other hand, the Mexican side had signed former Vélez Sarsfield goalkeeper, Argentine Miguel Marín, and Chilean back Alberto Quintano.

Nacional won its third International championship of the season after obtaining the 1971 Libertadores and the 1971 Intercontinental Cup on June and December 1971 respectively.

== Qualified teams ==
Team	Qualification	Previous final app.
(Uruguay) Nacional	1971 Copa Libertadores champion	(none)
(Mexico) Cruz Azul	1971 CONCACAF Champions' Cup champion	(none)

- **Bold** indicates winning years

== Venues ==
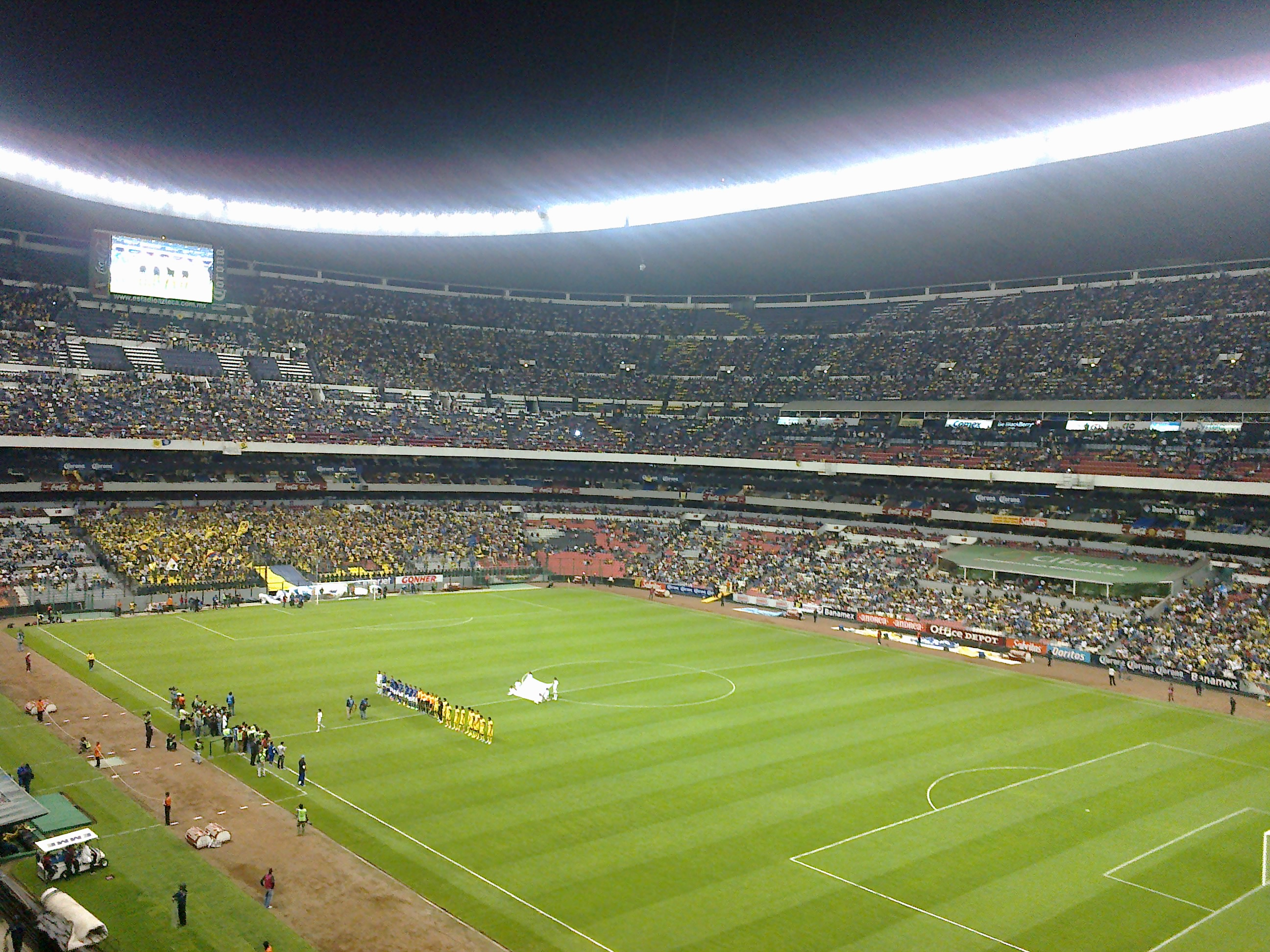
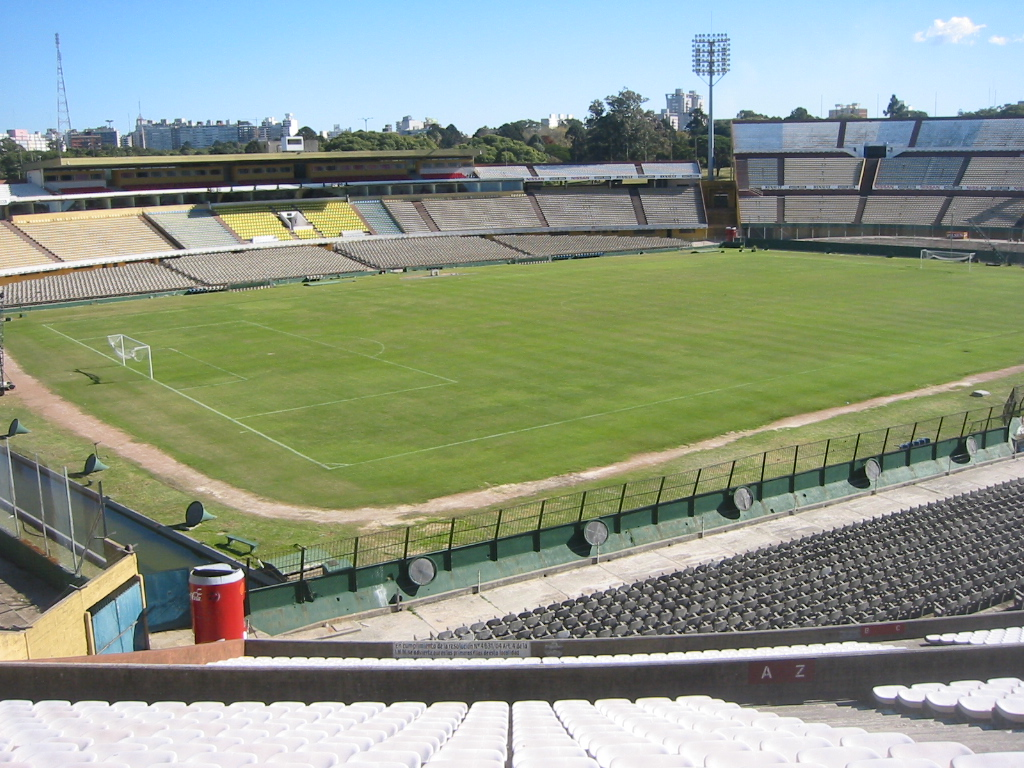
Estadio Azteca (left) and Estadio Centenario, venues for the series

== Match details ==
=== First leg ===
1971 Copa Interamericana
July 15, 1972
First leg

Cruz Azul (Mexico)	1–1	(Uruguay) Nacional
Héctor Pulido 1'		Mamelli 29'

Estadio Azteca, México City
Referee: Marco A. Regalado (Guatemala)

**Cruz Azul**	**Nacional**

GK	(Argentina) Miguel Marín
DF	(Mexico) Marco A. Ramírez
DF	(Mexico) Javier Guzmán
DF	(Chile) Alberto Quintano
DF	(Mexico) Javier Sánchez Galindo
MF	(Mexico) Juan M. Alejandrez	Substituted off
MF	(Mexico) Cesáreo Ramírez
MF	(Mexico) Héctor Pulido
FW	(Mexico) Fernando Bustos
FW	(Mexico) Octavio Muciño
FW	(Mexico) Horacio López Salgado
Substitutes:
MF	(Mexico) Juan de Jesús Prado	Substituted on
Manager:
(Mexico) Raúl Cárdenas

GK	(Brazil) Manga
DF	(Uruguay) Luis Ubiña
DF	(Uruguay) Ángel Brunell
DF	(Uruguay) Juan Masnik	(substituted off) 51'
DF	(Uruguay) Luis Cánepa
MF	(Uruguay) Julio Montero Castillo
MF	(Uruguay) Walter Mantegazza
MF	(Uruguay) Víctor Espárrago
FW	(Uruguay) Luis Cubilla
FW	(Argentina) Juan Carlos Mamelli
FW	(Uruguay) Washington Abad	(substituted off) 69'
Substitutes:
DF	(Uruguay) Gerolami	(substituted on) 51'
FW	(Uruguay) Ruben Suárez	(substituted on) 69'
Manager:
(Uruguay) Washington Etchamendi

=== Second leg ===
November 7, 1972
Second leg

Nacional (Uruguay)	2–1	(Mexico) Cruz Azul
Mamelli 35'; Castro 39'		Bustos 22'

Estadio Centenario, Montevideo
Referee: Mario Canessa (Colombia)

**Nacional**	**Cruz Azul**

GK	(Brazil) Manga
DF	(Uruguay) Luis Ubiña
DF	(Uruguay) Ángel Brunell
DF	(Uruguay) Juan Masnik
DF	(Uruguay) Juan Carlos Blanco
MF	(Uruguay) Ildo Maneiro
MF	(Uruguay) Walter Mantegazza
MF	(Uruguay) Ruben Suárez
FW	(Uruguay) Luis B. Castro
FW	(Argentina) Juan Carlos Mamelli
FW	(Uruguay) Julio César Morales
Manager:
(Uruguay) Washington Etchamendi

GK	(Argentina) Miguel Marín
DF	(Mexico) Marco A. Ramírez
DF	(Mexico) Javier Guzmán
DF	(Chile) Alberto Quintano
DF	(Mexico) Javier Sánchez Galindo
MF	(Mexico) Juan M. Alejandrez
MF	(Mexico) Cesáreo Ramírez
MF	(Mexico) Héctor Pulido
FW	(Mexico) Fernando Bustos
FW	(Mexico) Eladio Vera
FW	(Mexico) Horacio López Salgado
Manager:
(Mexico) Raúl Cárdenas
