= 1971 Copa Libertadores finals =

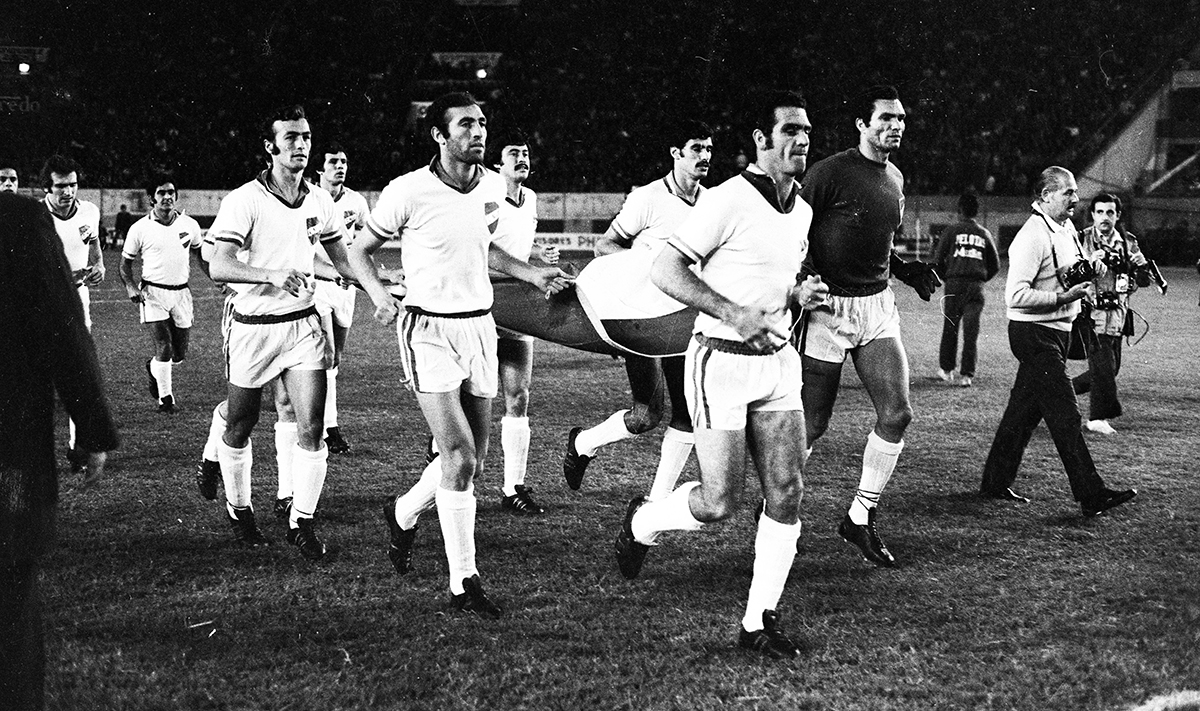
- Team of Nacional, champions
- Event: 1971 Copa Libertadores
Estudiantes (LP)	Nacional
(Argentina)	(Uruguay)
- 2–2 on points Nacional won after a play-off

First leg
Estudiantes (LP)	Nacional
1	0
- Date: 26 May 1971
- Venue: Estadio Estudiantes LP, La Plata
- Referee: Mario Canessa (Chile)
- Attendance: 30,000

Second leg
Nacional	Estudiantes (LP)
1	0
- Date: 2 June 1971
- Venue: Estadio Centenario, Montevideo
- Referee: José Favilli Neto (Brazil)
- Attendance: 70,000

Play-off
Nacional	Estudiantes (LP)
2	0
- Date: 9 June 1971
- Venue: Estadio Nacional, Lima
- Referee: Rafael Hormazábal (Chile)
- Attendance: 41,000

The 1971 Copa Libertadores de América was a football competition contested between the top clubs of the CONMEBOL federation. Uruguayan side Nacional won the competition defeating Argentine team Estudiantes de la Plata 2–0 in a playoff held in Estadio Nacional in Lima, Peru, after the two-legged series (in La Plata and Montevideo) ended with one win for each side.

It was the first Copa Libertadores won by Nacional, after three finals contested before with no success. Otherwise, Estudiantes lost their first final after three consecutive trophies won.

== Qualified teams ==
Team	Previous finals app.
(Argentina) Estudiantes LP	**1968**, **1969**, **1970**
(Uruguay) Nacional	1964, 1967, 1969

- **Bold** indicates winning years

== Venues ==
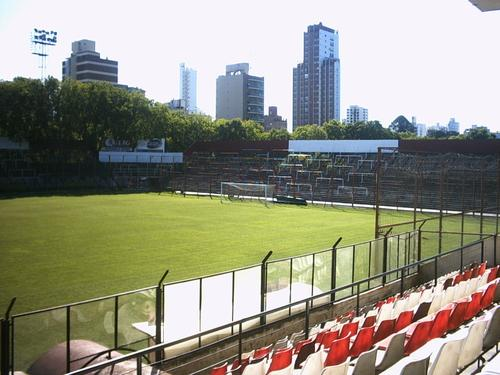
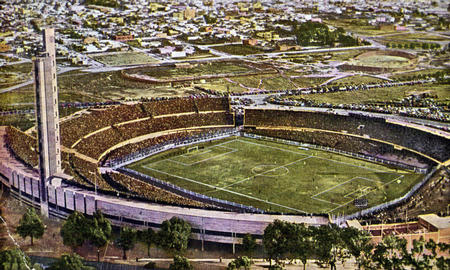
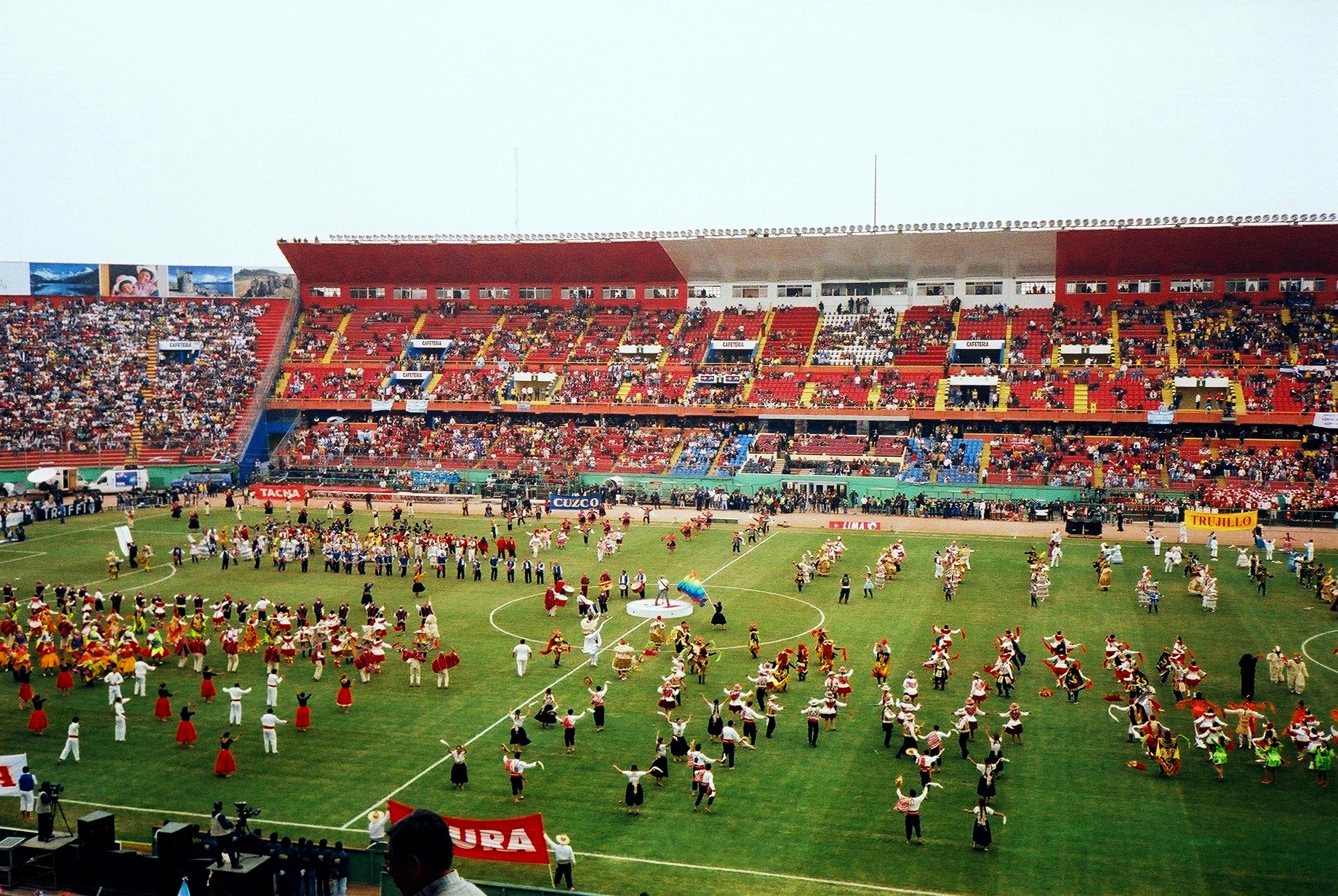
Fltr: Estudiantes, Centenario, and Nacional Stadiums, venues for the finals

== Match details ==
=== First leg ===
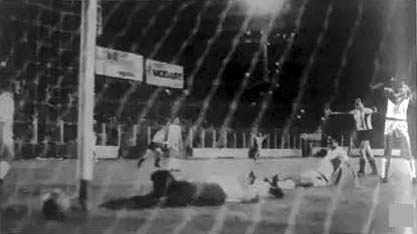
The Estudiantes LP goal by Daniel Romeo

1971 Copa Libertadores finals
26 May 1971
First leg

Estudiantes (LP) (Argentina)	1–0	(Uruguay) Nacional
Romeo 60'

Estadio Estudiantes LP, La Plata
Attendance: 30,000
Referee: Carlos Robles (Chile)

**Estudiantes LP**	**Nacional**

GK	(Argentina) Carlos Leone
DF	(Argentina) Ramón Aguirre Suárez
DF	(Argentina) Néstor Togneri
DF	(Argentina) Oscar Malbernat
MF	(Argentina) Carlos Pachamé
MF	(Argentina) José Hugo Medina
MF	(Argentina) Daniel Romeo
MF	(Argentina) Juan Echecopar
MF	(Czech Republic) Christian Rudzki	(substituted off) 84'
FW	(Argentina) Pedro Verde
FW	(Argentina) Juan Ramón Verón
Substitutes:
FW	(Argentina) Rubén Bedogni	(substituted on) 84'
Manager:
(Argentina) Miguel Ignomiriello

GK	(Brazil) Manga
DF	(Uruguay) Juan Carlos Blanco
DF	(Uruguay) Atilio Ancheta
DF	(Uruguay) Juan Masnik
DF	(Uruguay) Juan Mujica
DF	(Uruguay) Julio Montero Castillo
MF	(Uruguay) Víctor Espárrago	(substituted off) 63
MF	(Uruguay) Ildo Maneiro
FW	(Chile) Ignacio Prieto	(substituted off) 62
FW	(Argentina) Luis Artime
FW	(Uruguay) Julio C. Morales
Substitutes:
FW	(Uruguay) Rúben Bareño	(substituted on) 62
FW	(Argentina) Juan Carlos Mamelli	(substituted on) 63
Manager:
(Uruguay) Washington Etchamendi

=== Second leg ===
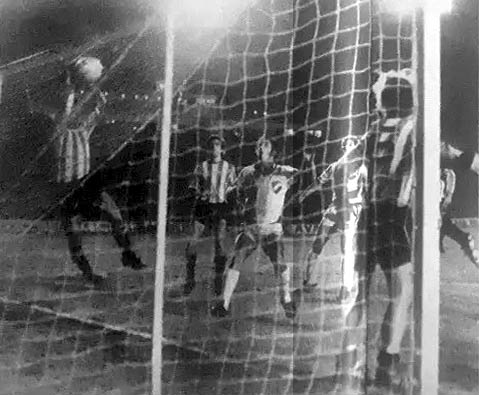
The second leg in Montevideo

2 June 1971
Second leg

Nacional (Uruguay)	1–0	(Argentina) Estudiantes (LP)
Masnik 28'

Estadio Centenario, Montevideo
Attendance: 70,000
Referee: Favilli Neto (Brazil)

**Nacional**	**Estudiantes LP**

GK	(Brazil) Manga
DF	(Uruguay) Luis Ubiña
DF	(Uruguay) Atilio Ancheta
DF	(Uruguay) Juan Masnik
DF	(Uruguay) Juan Carlos Blanco
DF	(Uruguay) Julio Montero Castillo
MF	(Uruguay) Víctor Espárrago
MF	(Uruguay) Ildo Maneiro
FW	(Uruguay) Luis Cubilla	(substituted off) 80'
FW	(Argentina) Luis Artime
FW	(Uruguay) Julio C. Morales
Substitutes:
FW	(Chile) Ignacio Prieto	(substituted on) 80'
Manager:
(Uruguay) Washington Etchamendi

GK	(Argentina) Carlos Leone
DF	(Argentina) Ramón Aguirre Suárez
DF	(Argentina) Néstor Togneri
DF	(Argentina) Oscar Malbernat
MF	(Argentina) Carlos Pachamé
MF	(Argentina) José Hugo Medina
MF	(Argentina) Daniel Romeo
MF	(Argentina) Juan Echecopar
MF	(Czech Republic) Christian Rudzki	(substituted off) 70'
FW	(Argentina) Pedro Verde
FW	(Argentina) Juan Ramón Verón
Substitutes:
FW	(Argentina) Rubén Bedogni	(substituted on) 70'
Manager:
(Argentina) Miguel Ignomiriello

=== Playoff ===
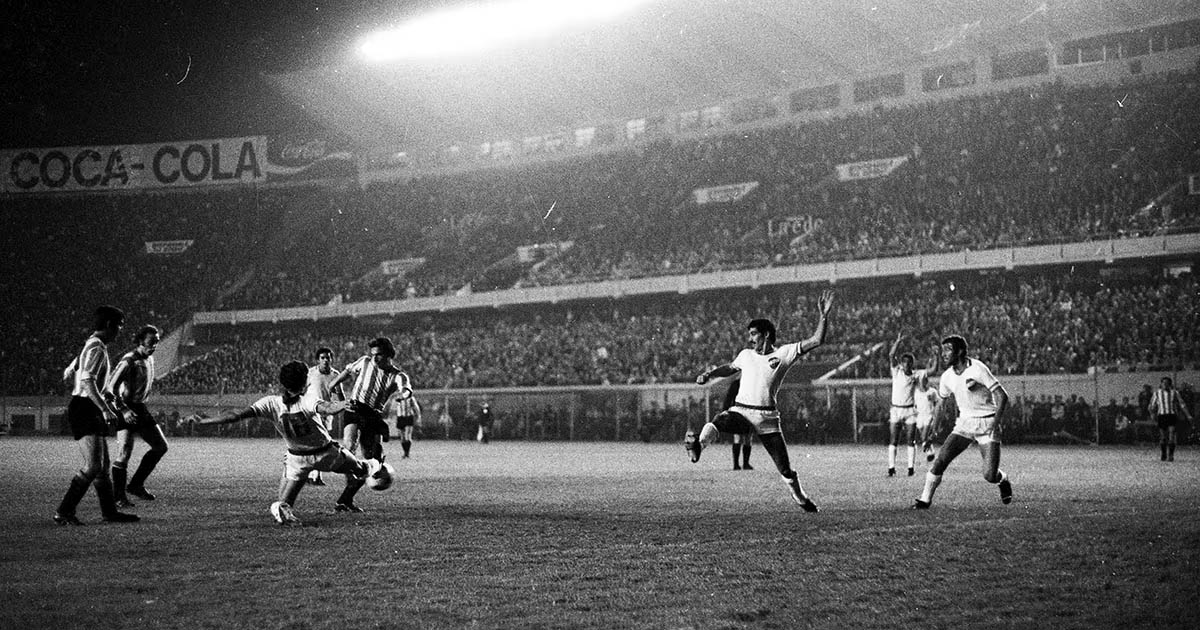
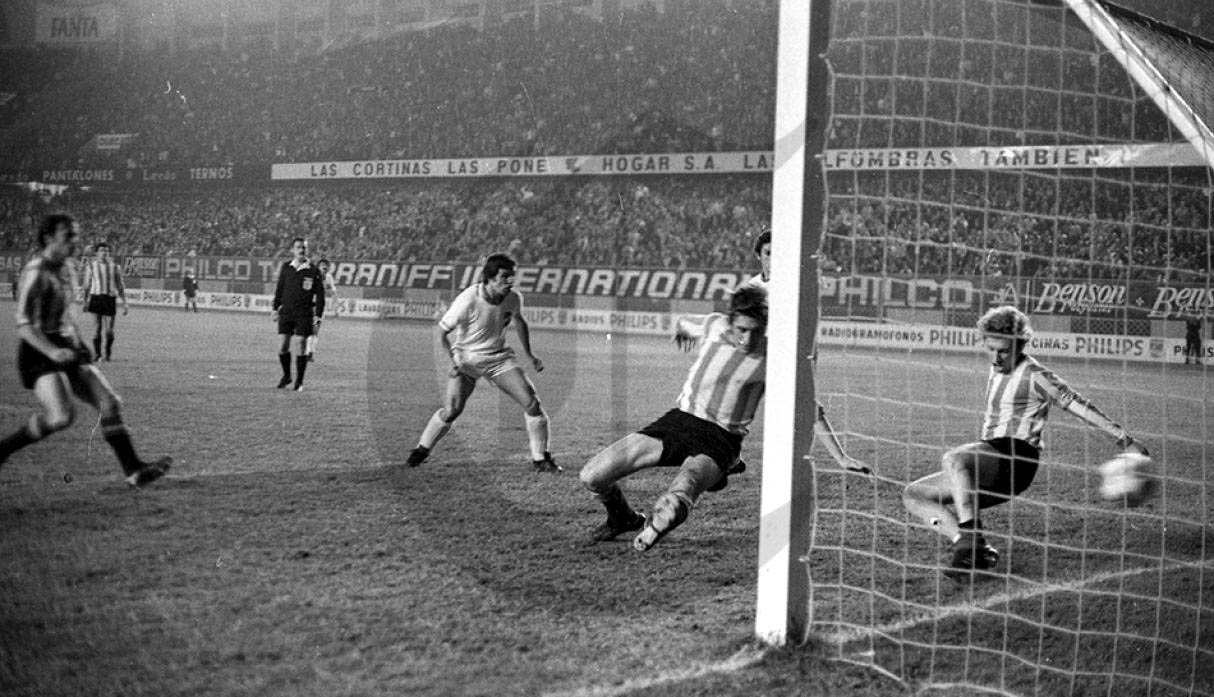
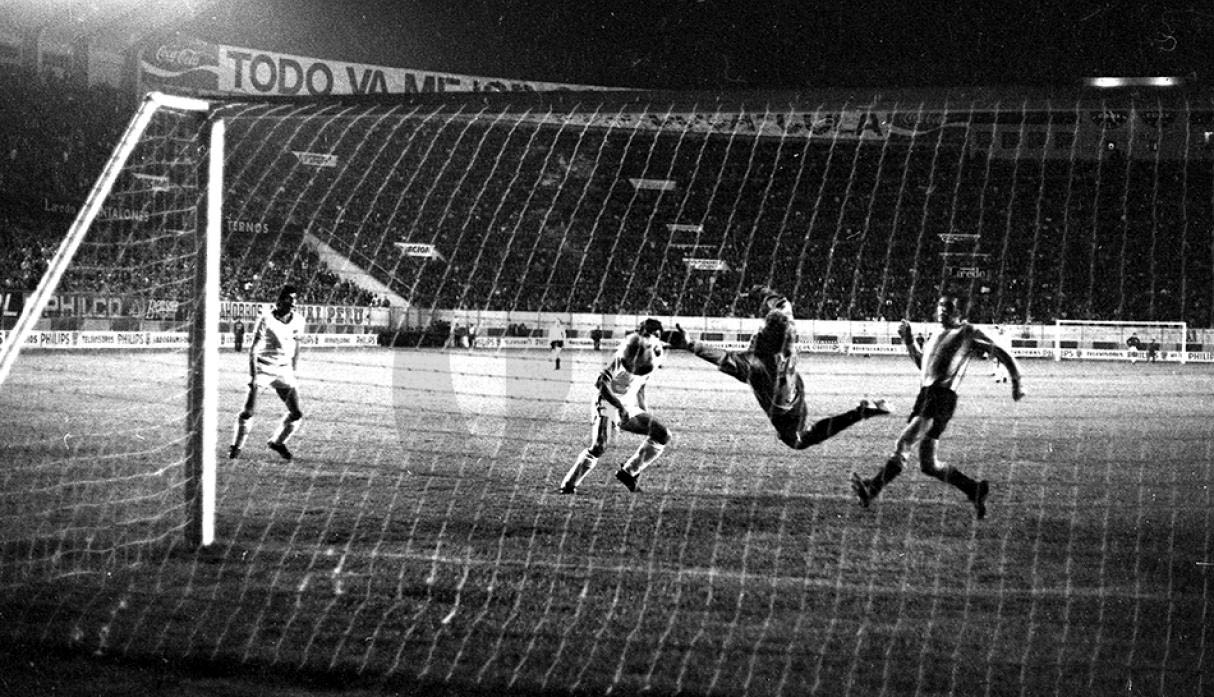
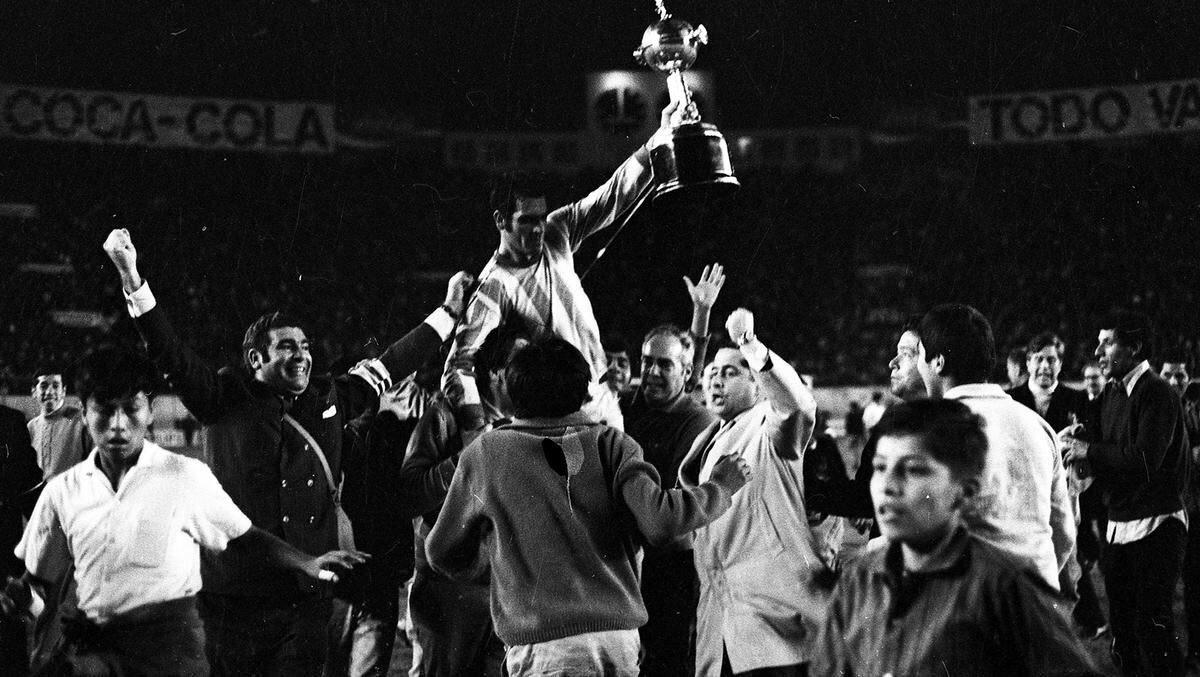
Some moments of the playoff held in Lima and later celebrations, with Nacional's captain Luis Ubiña carried on shoulders while raising the trophy
9 June 1971
Playoff

Nacional (Uruguay)	2–0	(Argentina) Estudiantes (LP)
Espárrago 22'; Artime 65'

Estadio Nacional, Lima
Attendance: 41,000
Referee: Rafael Hormazábal (Chile)

**Nacional**	**Estudiantes LP**

GK	(Brazil) Manga
DF	(Uruguay) Luis Ubiña (c)
DF	(Uruguay) Atilio Ancheta
DF	(Uruguay) Juan Masnik
DF	(Uruguay) Juan Carlos Blanco
DF	(Uruguay) Julio Montero Castillo
MF	(Uruguay) Víctor Espárrago
MF	(Uruguay) Ildo Maneiro	(substituted off) 83'
FW	(Uruguay) Luis Cubilla
FW	(Argentina) Luis Artime
FW	(Uruguay) Julio C. Morales	(substituted off) 64'
Substitutes:
FW	(Argentina) Juan Carlos Mamelli	(substituted on) 64'
DF	(Uruguay) Juan Mujica	(substituted on) 82'
Manager:
(Uruguay) Washington Etchamendi

GK	**12**	(Argentina) Oscar Pezzano
DF		(Argentina) Oscar Malbernat (c)
DF		(Argentina) Ramón Aguirre Suárez
DF		(Argentina) Néstor Togneri
DF		(Argentina) José Hugo Medina
MF		(Argentina) Carlos Pachamé
MF		(Argentina) Daniel Romeo
MF		(Argentina) Juan Echecopar
MF		(Czech Republic) Christian Rudzki
FW		(Argentina) Pedro Verde
FW		(Argentina) Juan Ramón Verón	(substituted off) 30'
Substitutes:
FW		(Argentina) Rubén Bedogni	(substituted on) 30'
Manager:
(Argentina) Miguel Ignomiriello
