= 1971 Intercontinental Cup =

- Event: Intercontinental Cup
Panathinaikos	Nacional
(Greece)	(Uruguay)
2	3
- on aggregate

First leg
Panathinaikos	Nacional
1	1
- Date: 15 December 1971
- Venue: Karaiskakis Stadium, Piraeus
- Referee: Favilli Neto (Brazil)
- Attendance: 38,440

Second leg
Nacional	Panathinaikos
2	1
- Date: 28 December 1971
- Venue: Estadio Centenario, Montevideo
- Referee: William Mullan (Scotland)
- Attendance: 63,000

The 1971 Intercontinental Cup was an association football tie held over two legs in December 1971 between the runners-up of the 1970–71 European Cup, Panathinaikos, replacing European Cup winners Ajax which declined to participate, and Nacional, winners of the 1971 Copa Libertadores.

The first leg was held on 15 December 1971 at the Karaiskakis Stadium, home of Olympiacos, since Panathinaikos ground was deemed unsuitable. The match finished up as a 1–1 draw. The goals came from Totis Filakouris in the 48th minute and Luis Artime in the 50th minute. Julio Morales broke the leg of Yiannis Tomaras and was sent off. Estadio Centenario hosted the return leg 13 days later on 28 December 1971. In the second leg, Nacional beat Panathinaikos 2–1, therefore the Uruguayan club won the series 3–2 on aggregate to achieve their first Intercontinental Cup trophy. Argentine striker Luis Artime was the keyplayer of the series after scoring three goals on both matches.

== Qualified teams ==
Team	Qualification	Previous finals app.
(Uruguay) Nacional	1971 Copa Libertadores champion	None
(Greece) Panathinaikos	1970–71 European Cup runner-up	None

- **Bold** indicates winning years

== Venues ==
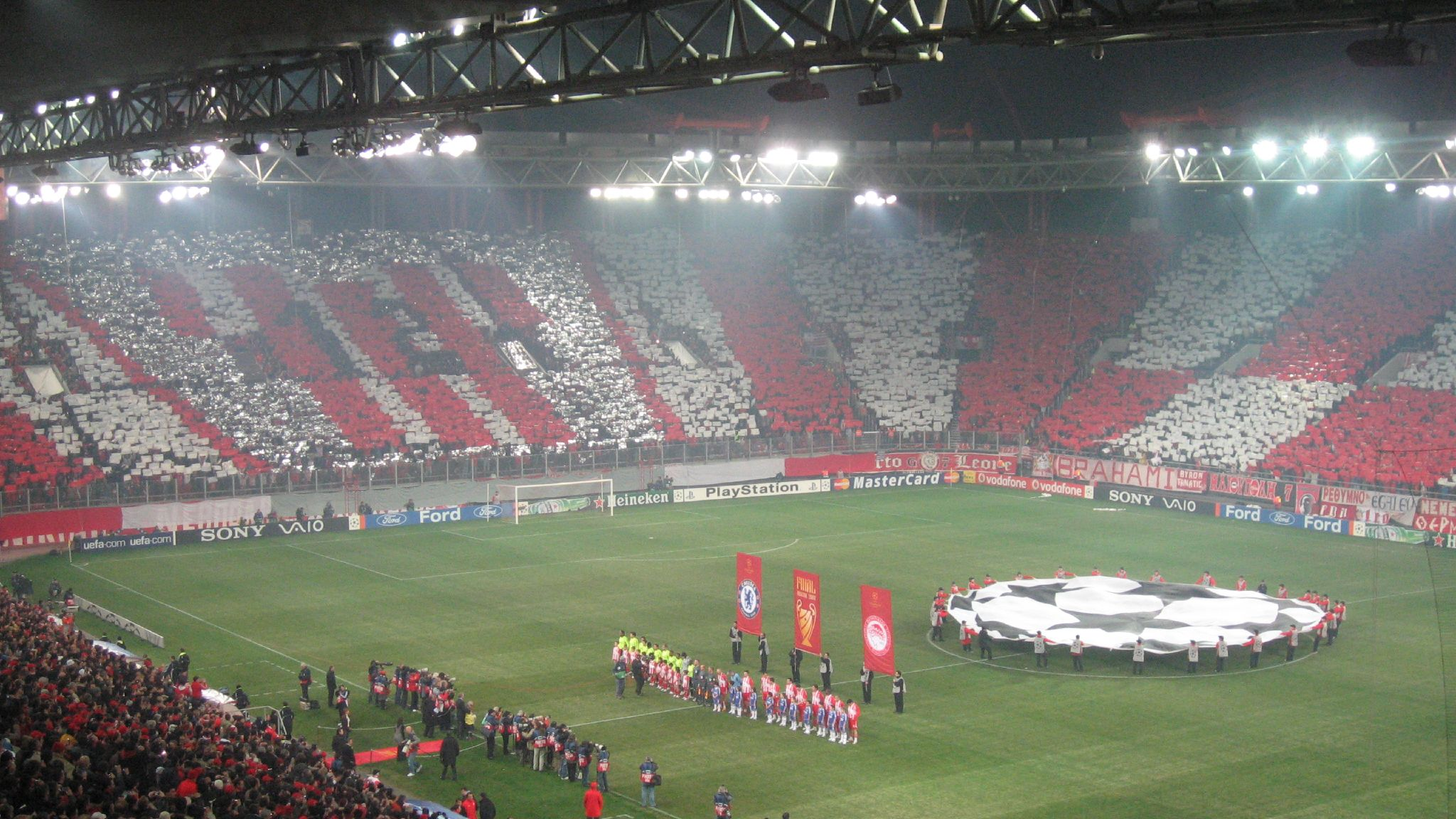
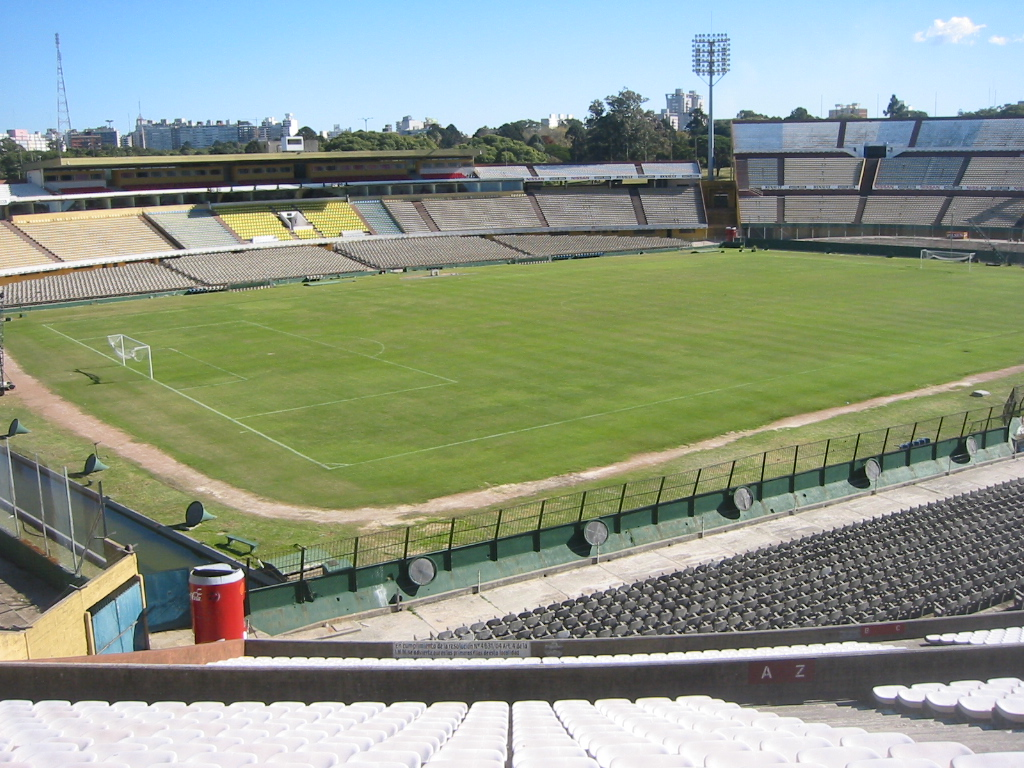
Karaiskakis Stadium (left) and Estadio Centenario, venues for the series

== Match details ==
=== First leg ===
1971 Intercontinental Cup
15 December 1971
First leg

Panathinaikos (Greece)	1–1	(Uruguay) Nacional
Filakouris 48'	Report	Artime 50'

Karaiskakis Stadium, Piraeus
Attendance: 35,000
Referee: Favilli Neto (Brazil)

**Panathinaikos**	**Nacional**

GK	1	(Greece) Takis Ikonomopoulos
DF	2	(Greece) Yiannis Tomaras	(substituted off) a'
DF	3	(Greece) Anthimos Kapsis
DF	4	(Greece) Frangiskos Sourpis
DF	5	(Greece) Kostas Athanassopoulos
MF	6	(Greece) Kostas Eleftherakis
MF	7	(Greece) Totis Filakouris
MF	8	(Greece) Mitsos Dimitriou
FW	9	(Greece) Antonis Antoniadis
MF	10	(Greece) Mimis Domazos (c)
FW	11	(Greece) Sakis Kouvas
Substitutes:
DF	12	(Greece) Giorgos Vlachos	(substituted on) a'
Manager:
(Hungary) Ferenc Puskás

GK	1	(Brazil) Manga
DF	2	(Uruguay) Juan Masnik
DF	3	(Uruguay) Ángel Brunell
DF	4	(Uruguay) Luis Ubiña
DF	5	(Uruguay) Julio Montero Castillo (c)
MF	6	(Uruguay) Juan Carlos Blanco
MF	7	(Uruguay) Luis Cubilla
MF	8	(Uruguay) Ildo Maneiro
FW	9	(Uruguay) Víctor Espárrago		(substituted off) a'
FW	10	(Argentina) Luis Artime
FW	11	(Uruguay) Julio Morales	Red card
Substitutes:
DF	12	(Uruguay) Juan J. Duarte		(substituted on) a'
Manager:
(Uruguay) Washington Etchamendi

=== Second leg ===
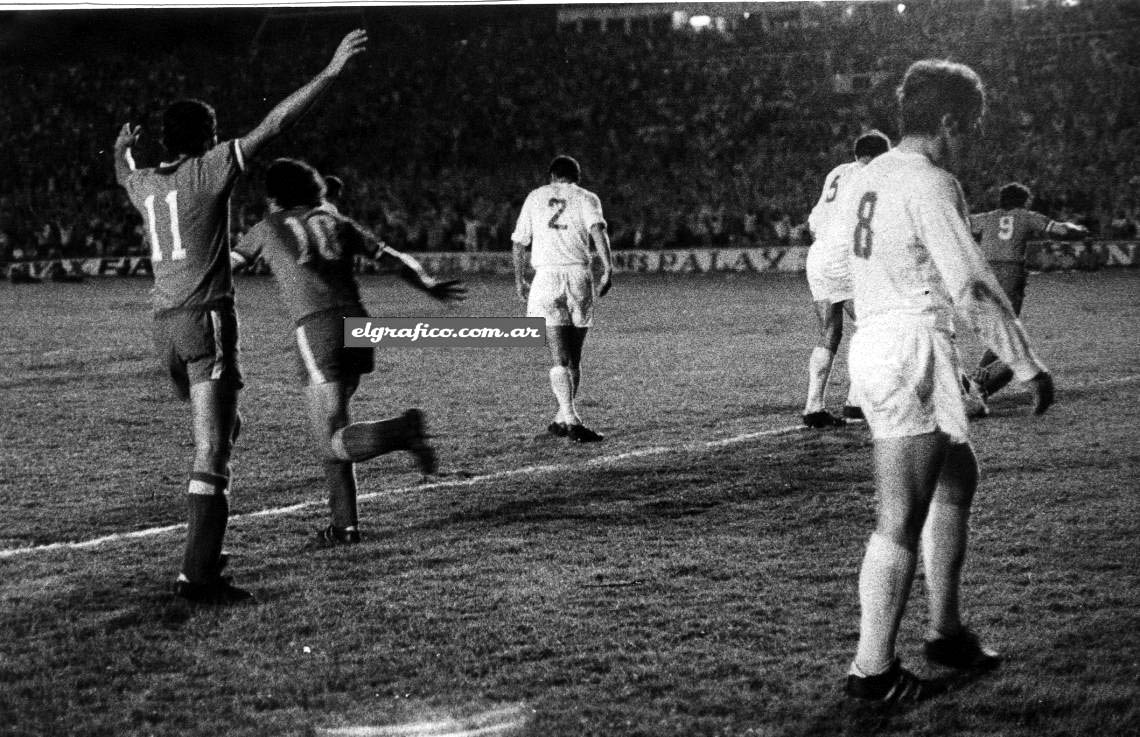
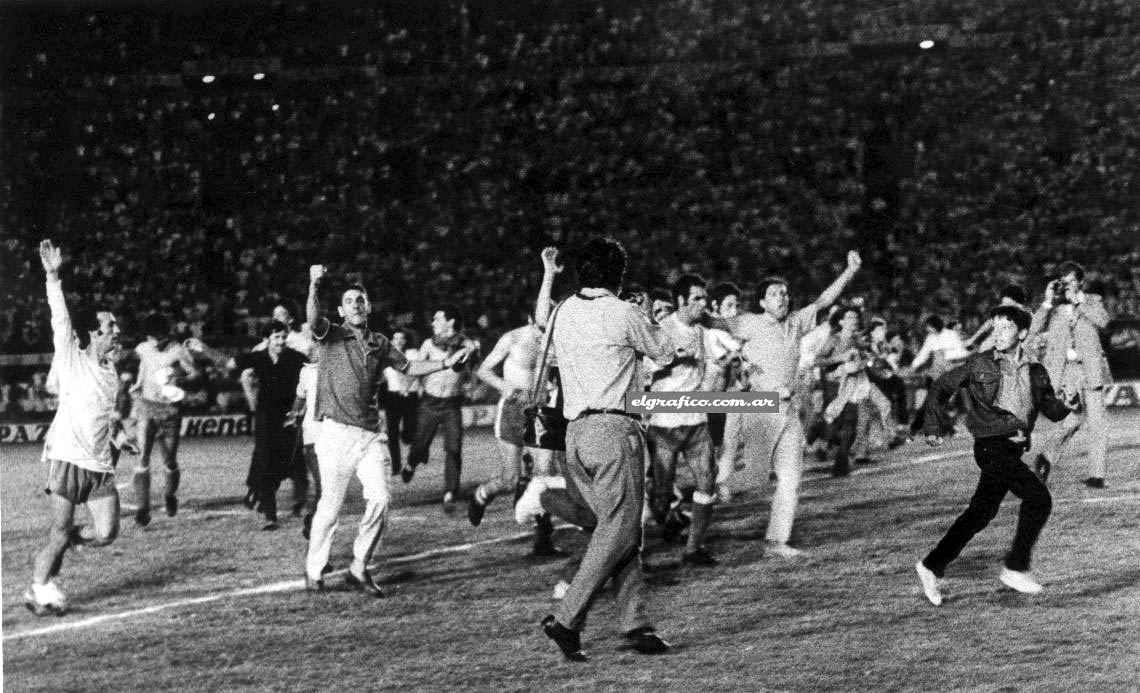
Two moments of the match, fltr: Artime celebrating his first goal, and players and supporters celebrating at the end
1971
28 December 1971
Second leg

Nacional (Uruguay)	2–1	(Greece) Panathinaikos
Artime 34', 74'	Report	Filakouris 89'

Estadio Centenario, Montevideo
Attendance: 63,000
Referee: William Mullan (Scotland)

**Nacional**	**Panathinaikos**

GK	1	(Brazil) Manga
DF	2	(Uruguay) Juan Masnik
DF	3	(Uruguay) Ángel Brunell
DF	4	(Uruguay) Luis Ubiña
DF	5	(Uruguay) Julio Montero Castillo (c)
MF	6	(Uruguay) Juan Carlos Blanco
MF	7	(Uruguay) Luis Cubilla	(substituted off) b'
MF	8	(Uruguay) Ildo Maneiro
FW	9	(Uruguay) Víctor Espárrago
FW	10	(Argentina) Luis Artime
FW	11	(Argentina) Juan C. Mamelli	(substituted off) a'
Substitutes:
DF	13	(Uruguay) Ruben Bareño	(substituted on) a'
DF	12	(Uruguay) Juan Mujica	(substituted on) b'
Manager:
(Uruguay) Washington Etchamendi

GK	1	(Greece) Takis Ikonomopoulos
DF	2	(Greece) Victor Mitropoulos
DF	3	(Greece) Anthimos Kapsis
DF	4	(Greece) Frangiskos Sourpis
DF	5	(Greece) Kostas Athanassopoulos
DF	6	(Greece) Aristidis Kamaras	(substituted off) a'
MF	7	(Greece) Kostas Eleftherakis
MF	8	(Greece) Mitsos Dimitriou
FW	9	(Greece) Antonis Antoniadis
MF	10	(Greece) Mimis Domazos (c)
FW	11	(Greece) Sakis Kouvas
Substitutes:
MF	12	(Greece) Totis Filakouris	(substituted on) a'
Manager:
(Hungary) Ferenc Puskás

== See also ==
- 1970–71 European Cup
- 1971 Copa Libertadores
- Panathinaikos F.C. in European football
