= Juan Carlos Mamelli =

Argentinian footballer (born 1946)

- Mamelli in the 1960s

Personal information
- Full name: Juan Carlos Mamelli Saquilán
- Date of birth: 5 March 1946 (age 80)
- Place of birth: Recreo, Catamarca Province, Argentina
- Position: Center forward

Senior career*
Years	Team	Apps	(Gls)
1965–1968	Belgrano		
1969–1973	Nacional	217	(106)
1973–1975	Real Betis	35	(9)
1975–1976	River Plate	1	(0)
1976	Atlético Tucumán		
1977–1980	Nacional	143	(38)
1980–1981	Rampla Juniors		
1982	Central Español		
1983	El Tanque Sisley		
- * Club domestic league appearances and goals

Juan Carlos Mamelli Saquilán (born 5 March 1946) is an Argentine retired footballer. Nicknamed "Palito", he played as a forward for a variety of Uruguayan clubs throughout the 1970s as he was most known for his career with Nacional, winning many titles with the club.

== Club career ==
Mamelli began his career with Belgrano in 1966, scoring his first goal in his home city of Recreo. Despite catching the interest of Uruguayan club Nacional to sign him on December 1968. However, his transfer was impeded by an injury for half a year as throughout this time, rumors began circulating of the club signing Pepona Reinaldi instead. However, Mamelli would arrive in time to play throughout the second half of the 1969 Campeonato Uruguayo Primera División. By the time of Luis Artime's departure for Fluminense in 1972, Mamelli became the club's main central forward as he scored 10 goals in 20 matches alone. He was also part of Nacional's golden generation that won the 1969, 1970, 1971 and 1972 Campeonato Uruguayo Primera División. 1971 also saw further success as the club won the 1971 Copa Libertadores that then played in the 1971 Intercontinental Cup against Greek club Panathinaikos who were runners-up of the 1970–71 European Cup with the Albos ending up winning in a 3–2 aggregate score.

This success caught the attention of Segunda División club Real Betis who were lacking a center forward. Despite them initially signing Vojin Lazarević for the role, he wouldn't get accustomed to Spain's climate and end up returning to Yugoslavia. This in turn, caused to take interest in Daniel Quevedo though he would end up declining the offer due to a lack of interest. Finally, Roberto Dale would suggest Mamelli to play for the club. He would later agree to the transfer where he arrived in Greece as Nacional was playing a series of friendlies over there at the time. After a payment of 8 million peseta, alongside fellow Argentine footballer Jorge Olmedo, Mamelli left for Andalusia and arrived on 8 September 1973. Throughout the 1973–74 season, club manager Ferenc Szusza had organized both Mamelli and Olmedo as the club's main attacking formation as they would commonly intercept kicks from their teammates Rogelio Sosa and Fernando Aramburu Escobal. The season would be incredibly successful for Betis as they were promoted to the following 1974–75 La Liga. Despite this initial success, Mamelli's attacking prowess would severely decrease throughout the following 1974–75 season and would be relegated to a substitute payer. Thus, by July 1975, he returned to Argentina to sign with River Plate. However, despite playing for 2 seasons, he would make just a single appearance. Following this and a similar disappointment with Atlético Tucumán, Mamelli returned to Nacional throughout 1977 to 1980, gaining an additional title at the 1977 Campeonato Uruguayo Primera División as well as later becoming the seventh top scorer of all time for the club. Even with his indefinite departure from Nacional, he still continued his career within Uruguay, helping them achieve their top-flight promotion following the 1980 Campeonato Uruguayo de Segunda División. Following brief stints with Central Español and El Tanque Sisley in 1982 and 1983 respectively, Mamelli retired.
