= Carlos Blanco =

Carlos Blanco may refer to:

- Carlos Blanco (baseball) (1914–1997), Cuban professional baseball player
- Carlos Blanco (footballer, born 1928) (1928–2011), Spanish-born Mexican footballer
- Carlos Blanco (footballer, born 1996), Spanish footballer
- Carlos Blanco (writer) (born 1986), Spanish writer
- Carlos Blanco Hernández (1917–2013), Spanish screenwriter, see Locura de amor
- Carlos Blanco Vila (born 1959), Spanish actor born in Vilagarcía de Arousa
- Carlos José Blanco Smith (born 1985), Australian rugby union player who competes for the Spain national team

== See also ==
- Juan Carlos Blanco (disambiguation)
