= List of world champion football club winning managers =

This is a list of world champion football club winning managers. It includes victories in the Intercontinental Cup (defunct) and the FIFA Club World Cup.

Pep Guardiola is the most successful manager with four titles followed by Carlos Bianchi and Carlo Ancelotti, claiming three titles each. Six managers also won the competitions twice: five achieved two consecutive titles, while Alex Ferguson became the only manager to win both Intercontinental Cup and Club World Cup. As of 2023, Argentinean managers have won more tournaments than any other nationality, securing twelve world titles, while Brazilian managers are closely behind with ten competition victories and Italian with nine.

== Winning managers ==
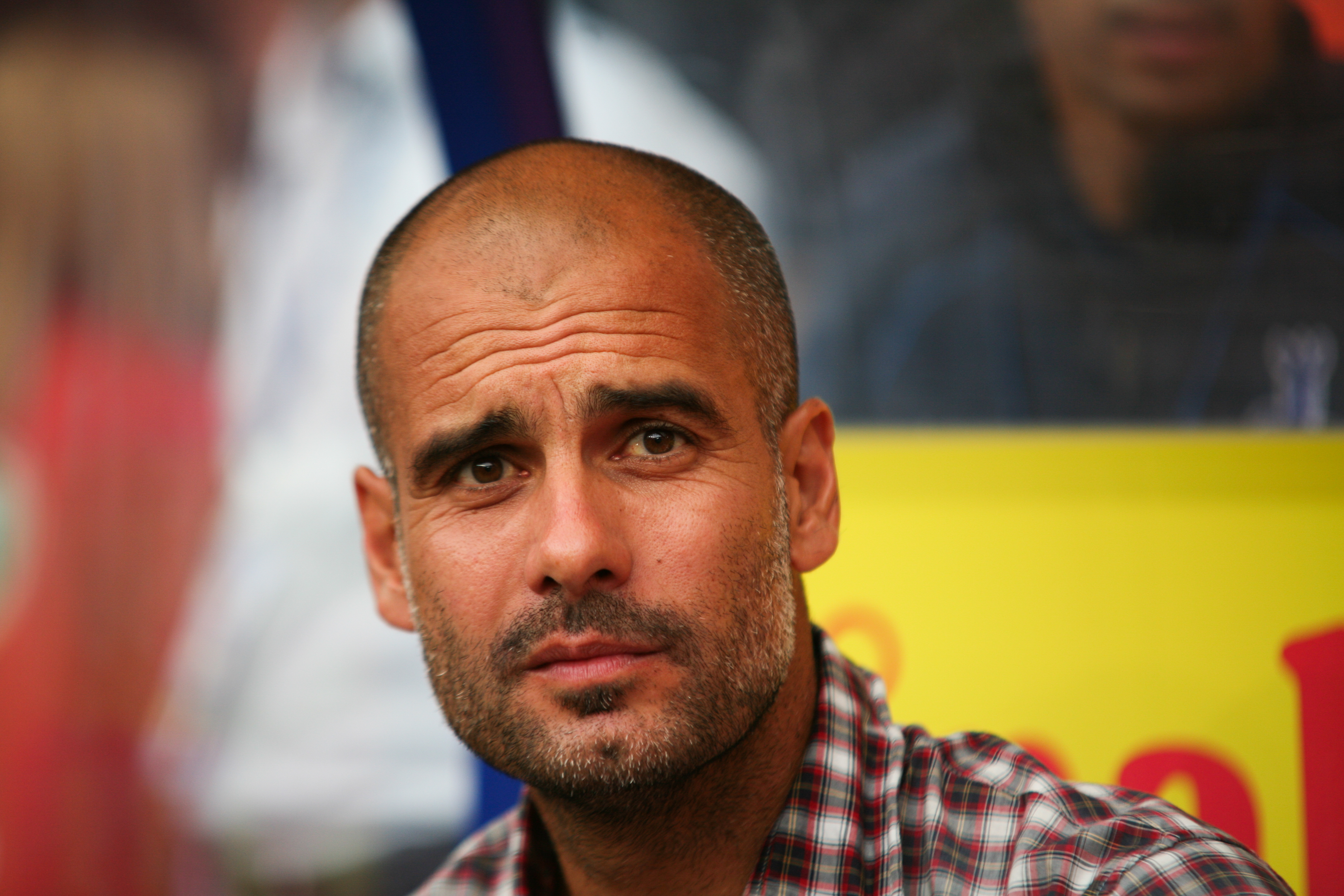
Pep Guardiola became the second manager to secure a joint-record total of three world champion titles; he was also the first manager to win three FIFA Club World Cup titles.

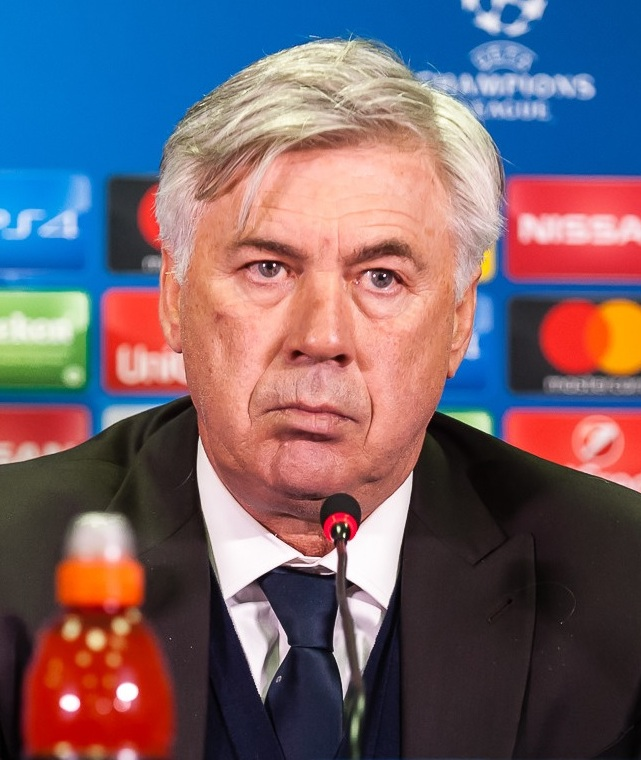
Carlo Ancelotti became the third and most recent manager to achieve a joint-record total of three successes in club world championships.

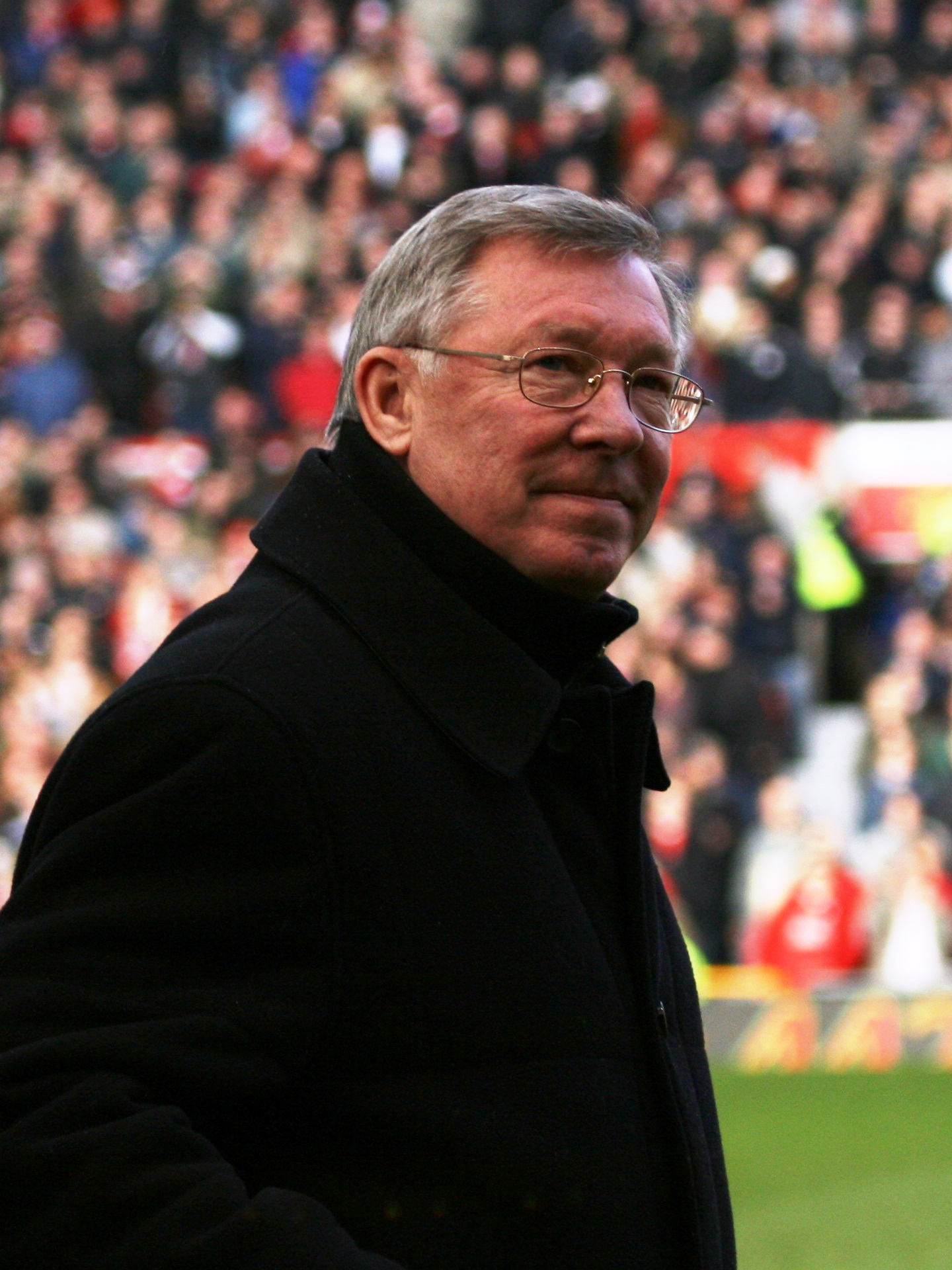
Alex Ferguson, the only manager to win both world champion titles (the Intercontinental Cup and the FIFA Club World Cup).

The following lists are correct as of the conclusion of the 2023 FIFA Club World Cup.

=== By number of titles ===
Key

IC	Intercontinental Cup (defunct)
FCWC	FIFA Club World Cup

	Manager	IC	FCWC	Total
(Spain)	Pep Guardiola	–	4	4
(Argentina)	Carlos Bianchi	3	–	3
(Italy)	Carlo Ancelotti	–	3	3
(Brazil)	Luís Alonso Pérez	2	–	2
(Argentina)	Helenio Herrera	2	–	2
(Italy)	Arrigo Sacchi	2	–	2
(Brazil)	Telê Santana	2	–	2
(Scotland)	Alex Ferguson	1	1	2
(France)	Zinedine Zidane	–	2	2
(Spain)	Miguel Muñoz	1	–	1
(Uruguay)	Roberto Scarone	1	–	1
(Uruguay)	Roque Máspoli	1	–	1
(Argentina)	Juan Pizzuti	1	–	1
(Argentina)	Osvaldo Zubeldía	1	–	1
(Italy)	Nereo Rocco	1	–	1
(Austria)	Ernst Happel	1	–	1
(Uruguay)	Washington Etchamendi	1	–	1
(Romania)	Ștefan Kovács	1	–	1
(Argentina)	Roberto Ferreiro	1	–	1
(Spain)	Luis Aragonés	1	–	1
(West Germany)	Dettmar Cramer	1	–	1
(Argentina)	Juan Carlos Lorenzo	1	–	1
(Uruguay)	Luis Cubilla	1	–	1
(Uruguay)	Juan Mujica	1	–	1
(Brazil)	Paulo César Carpegiani	1	–	1
(Uruguay)	Hugo Bagnulo	1	–	1
(Brazil)	Valdir Espinosa	1	–	1
(Argentina)	José Pastoriza	1	–	1
(Italy)	Giovanni Trapattoni	1	–	1
(Argentina)	Héctor Veira	1	–	1
(Socialist Federal Republic of Yugoslavia)	Tomislav Ivić	1	–	1
(Uruguay)	Roberto Fleitas	1	–	1
(Socialist Federal Republic of Yugoslavia)	Vladica Popović	1	–	1
(Netherlands)	Louis van Gaal	1	–	1
(Italy)	Marcello Lippi	1	–	1
(Italy)	Nevio Scala	1	–	1
(Netherlands)	Guus Hiddink	1	–	1
(Germany)	Ottmar Hitzfeld	1	–	1
(Spain)	Vicente del Bosque	1	–	1
(Spain)	Víctor Fernández	1	–	1
(Brazil)	Oswaldo de Oliveira	–	1	1
(Brazil)	Paulo Autuori	–	1	1
(Brazil)	Abel Braga	–	1	1
(Spain)	Rafael Benítez	–	1	1
(Brazil)	Tite	–	1	1
(Spain)	Luis Enrique	–	1	1
(Argentina)	Santiago Solari	–	1	1
(Germany)	Jürgen Klopp	–	1	1
(Germany)	Hansi Flick	–	1	1
(Germany)	Thomas Tuchel	–	1	1

=== By nationality ===
This table lists the total number of titles won by managers of each nationality.

Nationality	IC	FCWC	Total
Argentina	11	1	12
Brazil	6	4	10
Italy	6	3	9
Spain	4	5	9
Uruguay	7	–	7
Germany	2	3	5
France	–	2	2
Netherlands	2	–	2
Scotland	1	1	2
Yugoslavia	2	–	2
Austria	1	–	1
Romania	1	–	1
