= Otto Vieira =

Brazilian football manager

Personal information
- Full name: Otto Vieira
- Date of birth: 2 August 1921
- Place of birth: Rio de Janeiro, Brazil
- Date of death: 11 August 1991 (aged 70)
- Place of death: São Paulo, Brazil

Managerial career
- Years: Team
- 1949–1950: Brazil (assistant)
- 1950–1951: Fluminense
- 1953: Vasco da Gama (assistant)
- 1954–1955: Santa Cruz
- 1956–1957: Náutico
- 1957: Botafogo-SP
- 1957–1958: São Paulo (assistant)
- 1959: Portuguesa
- 1960–1961: Porto
- 1964: São Paulo
- 1965: Botafogo-SP
- 1967: Portuguesa
- 1968: Francana
- 1968: Juventus-SP
- 1969–1970: Millonarios
- 1970–1972: Barcelona SC
- 1975: Barcelona SC
- 1977: Araçatuba
- 1980: Barcelona SC
- 1981: 9 de Octubre
- 1981: Ecuador

Otto Vieira (2 August 1921 – 11 August 1991), was a Brazilian professional football manager.

== Career ==
Otto Vieira started as a technical assistant to Luiz Vinhaes in the Brazilian under-22 team that competed in the 1949 South American Championship in Chile. The following year, he was Flávio Costa's assistant at the 1950 FIFA World Cup. He also coached Fluminense FC's youth teams on several occasions, and the club's main team in 1950–51. In 1953 he was again Flávio Costa's assistant, this time at CR Vasco da Gama.

He later coached Santa Cruz and Náutico, and in 1957, after a good campaign with Botafogo-SP, he was hired by São Paulo again as an assistant, this time for the Hungarian Béla Guttmann. He later coached Portuguesa, FC Porto, Millonarios FC, returned to São Paulo FC in 1964, and finally Barcelona SC de Guayaquil, a team with which he was consecutive Ecuadorian champion in 1970 and 1971, as well as twice semi-finalist in the Copa Libertadores. He returned to the club in 1980 and once again became national champion, ending his career as coach the following season with 9 de Octubre.

== Honours ==
Barcelona

- Ecuadorian Serie A: 1970, 1971, 1980
