= Heberto Blanco =

Cuban baseball player (born 1920)

- Second baseman / Shortstop
- Born: October 7, 1920; Bayamo, Cuba
- Died: October 12, 2011 (aged 91); Havana, Cuba

Negro league baseball debut
- 1941, for the New York Cubans

Last appearance
- 1942, for the New York Cubans
- Stats at Baseball Reference

Teams
- New York Cubans (1941–1942)

Heberto A. Blanco (October 7, 1920 – October 12, 2011) was a Cuban professional baseball second baseman and shortstop in the Negro leagues and Mexican League.

A native of Bayamo, Cuba, Blanco was the younger brother of fellow-Negro leaguer Carlos Blanco. He made his Negro leagues debut in 1941 with the New York Cubans, and played for New York again in 1942, when he was selected to represent the club in the East–West All-Star Game. Blanco went on to play many seasons in the Mexican League, and played minor league baseball for the Roswell Rockets in 1956. He died in Havana, Cuba in 2011 at age 91.
