= Juan Carlos Blanco =

Juan Carlos Blanco may refer to:

- Juan Carlos Blanco (volleyball) (born 1981), Venezuelan volleyball player
- Juan Carlos Blanco Fernández (1847–1910), Uruguayan politician
- Juan Carlos Blanco Acevedo (1879–1952), Uruguayan politician, son of Juan Carlos Blanco Fernández
- Juan Carlos Blanco Estradé (1934–2021), Uruguayan politician, grandson of Blanco Fernández and nephew of Blanco Acevedo
- Juan Carlos Blanco (footballer, born 1946), Uruguayan football player and manager
