= Julio Morales (Uruguayan footballer) =

Uruguayan footballer (1945–2022)

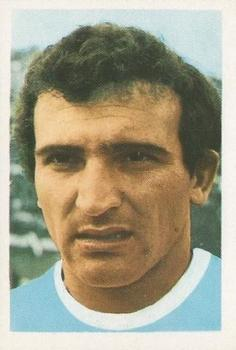
- Morales in 1970

Personal information
- Full name: Julio César Morales Araújo
- Date of birth: 16 February 1945
- Place of birth: Montevideo, Uruguay
- Date of death: 14 February 2022 (aged 76)
- Place of death: Montevideo, Uruguay
- Height: 1.64 m (5 ft 5 in)
- Position: Striker

Senior career*
Years	Team	Apps	(Gls)
1961–1965	Racing Montevideo		
1965–1972	Nacional		
1973–1978	Austria Wien	168	(55)
1979–1982	Nacional		

International career
1966–1981	Uruguay	24	(11)
Medal record
Men's football
Representing Uruguay
Mundialito
Winner	1980 Uruguay
- * Club domestic league appearances and goals

Julio César Morales Araújo, nicknamed Cascarilla (16 February 1945 – 14 February 2022) was a Uruguayan professional footballer who played as a striker. He was part of the Uruguay squad for the 1970 World Cup, where they finished fourth, as well as in a Mundialito winning team in January 1981, at the age of almost 36. He won a number of trophies in South America and Europe including the Copa Libertadores in 1971 and 1980.

== Club career ==
Morales started his career in 1961 at the age of 16 with Racing Club de Montevideo, in 1965 he was signed by Uruguayan giants Nacional he helped the club to win five league titles and a Copa Libertadores before moving to Europe to play for Austria Wien.

With Austria Wien he won two Austrian league titles and two Austrian Cups, he also played in the European Cup Winners Cup final in 1978.

After the disappointment of missing out on the Cup Winners Cup, Morales returned to Nacional, where he won another league title and Copa Libertadores before his retirement in 1982.

Morales is the fifth highest scoring player in the history of the Copa Libertadores with 30 goals, he scored a total of 191 goals for Nacional in 471 appearances.

== Death ==
Morales died in Montevideo on 14 February 2022, aged 76.

== Honours ==
Nacional

- Primera División (6): 1966, 1969, 1970, 1971, 1972, 1980
- Copa Libertadores: 1971, 1980
- Copa Intercontinental: 1971, 1980
- Copa Interamericana: 1971

Austria Wien

- Austrian Bundesliga: 1975–76, 1977–78
- Austrian Cup: 1973-74, 1976-77

Uruguay

- Mundialito: 1980
