= 1970 Campeonato Nacional Primera División =

Campeonato Profesional de Fútbol
- Dates: 5 April 1970 – 27 January 1971
- Champions: Colo-Colo (10th title)
- Relegated: Palestino
- 1971 Copa Libertadores: Colo-Colo; Unión Española
- Matches: 340
- Goals: 968 (2.85 per match)
- Top goalscorer: Osvaldo Castro (36 goals)
- Biggest home win: Green Cross Temuco 5–1 Unión La Calera (6 June); Deportes La Serena 5–1 Unión La Calera (5 July); Universidad Católica 5–1 Unión La Calera (1 August); Huachipato 5–1 Unión La Calera (13 September)
- Highest attendance: 72,363 Colo-Colo 0–1 Unión Española (16 January 1971)
- Total attendance: 2,827,344
- Average attendance: 8,316

The 1970 Campeonato Nacional de Futbol Profesional was first tier’s 38th season. Colo-Colo was the tournament's champion, winning its tenth honor after seven years without a title.

== First stage ==
=== Torneo Metropolitano ===
Pos	Team	Pld	W	D	L	GF	GA	GD	Pts	Qualification
1	Unión Española	14	10	2	2	23	10	+13	22	Wins points for the National Tournament (Note: The top 5 teams earned bonus points: Unión Española 5 pts, Universidad Católica 4 pts, Colo-Colo 3 pts, Universidad de Chile 2pts, O'Higgins 1 pt)
2	Universidad Católica	14	9	2	3	30	18	+12	20	Wins points for the National Tournament
3	Colo-Colo	14	6	3	5	20	16	+4	15	Wins points for the National Tournament
4	Universidad de Chile	14	4	7	3	28	25	+3	15	Wins points for the National Tournament
5	O'Higgins	14	3	6	5	19	21	−2	12	Wins points for the National Tournament
6	Palestino	14	4	3	7	21	27	−6	11	
7	Audax Italiano	14	3	4	7	18	27	−9	10	
8	Magallanes	14	2	3	9	12	27	−15	7	

Notes:

Home \ Away	AUDI	COLO	MAGA	OHIG	PALE	UESP	UCAT	UCHI
Audax		0–1	0–0	0–0	4–1	1–3	0–3	3–3
Colo-Colo	3–1		2–2	3–0	0–1	1–0	1–3	1–4
Magallanes	3–4	0–3		0–3	0–2	0–1	2–1	1–2
O'Higgins	0–1	1–1	4–1		2–3	0–2	1–1	1–1
Palestino	2–2	0–2	3–1	1–1		0–1	2–3	0–2
U. Española	2–0	2–1	0–0	1–2	2–0		2–1	1–1
U. Católica	3–1	1–0	1–0	3–1	3–2	2–4		1–1
U. de Chile	3–1	1–1	1–2	3–3	4–4	1–2	1–4	

Legend: Blue = home team win; Yellow = draw; Red = away team win.

=== Torneo Provincial ===
Pos	Team	Pld	W	D	L	GF	GA	GD	Pts	Qualification
1	Deportes Concepción	18	9	5	4	35	24	+11	23	Wins points for the National Tournament (Note: The top 5 teams earned bonus points: Deportes Concepción 5 pts, Green Cross Temuco 4 pts, Huachipato 3 pts, Deportes La Serena 2pts, Everton 1 pt)
2	Green Cross Temuco	18	8	6	4	34	24	+10	22	Wins points for the National Tournament
3	Huachipato	18	8	4	6	29	22	+7	20	Wins points for the National Tournament
4	Deportes La Serena	18	7	6	5	23	20	+3	20	Wins points for the National Tournament
5	Everton	18	6	7	5	26	24	+2	19	Wins points for the National Tournament
6	Antofagasta Portuario	18	6	7	5	19	19	0	19	
7	Lota Schwager	18	6	5	7	29	25	+4	17	
8	Rangers	18	6	4	8	22	24	−2	16	
9	Santiago Wanderers	18	5	4	9	19	34	−15	14	
10	Unión La Calera	18	2	6	10	23	43	−20	10	

Notes:

Home \ Away	ANTP	DCON	EVER	GCRT	HUAC	DLSE	LOTS	RANG	ULCA	SWAN
Antofagasta P.		0–0	2–0	1–0	0–3	0–2	3–3	0–0	0–0	1–1
D. Concepción	0–1		1–0	2–2	2–1	5–2	2–3	3–2	2–1	4–2
Everton	1–1	1–2		4–4	1–3	1–0	2–1	1–2	1–1	2–0
Green Cross T.	1–0	2–3	2–2		0–0	1–1	1–0	2–1	5–1	2–2
Huachipato	2–4	1–1	1–2	2–0		0–2	1–1	2–0	4–0	1–3
D. La Serena	0–0	1–0	0–0	0–2	1–1		0–3	1–1	1–1	2–0
Lota S.	1–2	1–1	0–1	1–2	1–2	3–1		0–0	4–1	3–1
Rangers	1–0	0–4	0–3	1–3	3–0	1–2	0–1		1–1	3–0
U. La Calera	2–3	3–3	2–2	3–2	1–2	1–5	3–1	1–4		0–1
S. Wanderers	2–1	1–0	2–2	0–3	0–3	0–2	2–2	0–2	2–1	

Legend: Blue = home team win; Yellow = draw; Red = away team win.

== National Tournament ==
=== Zona A ===
Pos	Team	Pld	W	D	L	GF	GA	GD	BP	Pts	Qualification
1	Universidad Católica	18	10	2	6	35	27	+8	4	26	Plays the Championship Stage
2	Lota Schwager	18	9	6	3	21	13	+8	0	24	Plays the Championship Stage
3	Deportes Concepción	18	6	7	5	23	20	+3	5	24	Plays the Championship Stage
4	Universidad de Chile	18	8	5	5	18	12	+6	2	23	Plays the Championship Stage
5	O'Higgins	18	7	5	6	23	21	+2	1	20	
6	Huachipato	18	5	6	7	27	25	+2	3	19	
7	Audax Italiano	18	7	2	9	18	21	−3	0	16	
8	Antofagasta Portuario	18	3	7	8	15	26	−11	0	13	
9	Unión La Calera	18	1	8	9	18	37	−19	0	10	Plays the Relegation Playoffs

Home \ Away	ANTP	ULCA	UCAT	UCHI	AUDI	OHIG	HUAC	DCON	LOTS
Antofagasta P.		1–1	1–2	2–1	0–1	1–1	0–0	2–2	1–2
U. La Calera	2–2		2–2	0–1	1–2	1–1	3–2	1–2	1–1
U. Católica	2–1	5–1		1–1	3–2	4–2	3–1	1–0	2–3
U. de Chile	2–0	3–0	1–0		1–1	3–0	0–1	0–3	1–0
Audax I.	0–1	3–0	1–0	1–0		0–2	3–2	0–2	1–2
O'Higgins	2–1	2–2	4–1	0–1	2–0		3–2	2–0	1–0
Huachipato	1–1	5–1	1–0	1–1	1–1	2–1		1–2	1–1
Concepción	0–0	1–1	2–3	2–0	2–2	1–0	2–2		1–1
Lota S.	0–1	2–0	2–0	0–0	1–0	0–0	1–0	1–0	

Legend: Blue = home team win; Yellow = draw; Red = away team win.

=== Interzone ===
OHIG	0–0	GCRT	2–0
UCAT	5–2	DLSE	0–1
EVER	1–0	AUDI	0–0
SWAN	0–0	UCHI	2–0
MAGA	1–4	HUAC	0–1
DCON	0–0	COLO	3–1
LOTS	2–2	PALE	1–2
UESP	4–0	ANTP	0–3
RANG	1–1	ULCA	0–1

=== Zona B ===
Pos	Team	Pld	W	D	L	GF	GA	GD	BP	Pts	Qualification
1	Unión Española	18	10	7	1	35	18	+17	5	32	Plays the Championship Stage
2	Everton	18	11	3	4	34	22	+12	1	26	Plays the Championship Stage
3	Colo-Colo	18	7	6	5	26	23	+3	3	23	Plays the Championship Stage
4	Green Cross Temuco	18	6	6	6	24	21	+3	4	22	Plays the Championship Stage
5	Magallanes	18	6	5	7	29	30	−1	0	17	
6	Deportes La Serena	18	5	4	9	16	28	−12	2	16	
7	Rangers	18	5	5	8	23	28	−5	0	15	
8	Santiago Wanderers	18	6	3	9	20	29	−9	0	15	
9	Palestino	18	3	7	8	26	30	−4	0	13	Plays Relegation Playoffs

Home \ Away	DLSE	EVER	SWAN	UESP	COLO	MAGA	PALE	RANG	GCRT
La Serena		1–2	1–1	1–0	0–1	0–1	0–2	1–0	4–3
Everton	0–1		2–1	2–3	2–1	3–1	4–2	2–0	0–1
S. Wanderers	1–1	1–4		0–2	2–1	0–3	3–1	2–0	1–1
U. Española	3–0	1–1	1–0		1–1	3–2	2–1	1–1	1–1
Colo-Colo	0–1	1–4	2–1	2–2		2–0	0–0	1–1	3–1
Magallanes	1–1	1–1	3–4	2–2	3–1		0–0	2–1	2–0
Palestino	1–1	4–1	0–1	2–3	0–1	3–3		3–1	2–2
Rangers	3–1	0–1	2–1	2–2	2–4	3–2	4–2		0–0
Green Cross T.	3–0	2–3	3–0	0–1	2–2	1–0	0–0	2–1	

Legend: Blue = home team win; Yellow = draw; Red = away team win.

== Championship stage ==
Pos	Team	Pld	W	D	L	GF	GA	GD	Pts	Qualification
1	Unión Española	7	6	0	1	17	5	+12	12	Qualified for the Championship play-off and 1971 Copa Libertadores
2	Colo-Colo	7	6	0	1	19	9	+10	12	Qualified for the Championship play-off and 1971 Copa Libertadores
3	Universidad de Chile	7	4	0	3	11	8	+3	8	
4	Universidad Católica	7	4	0	3	13	16	−3	8	
5	Deportes Concepción	7	3	1	3	13	13	0	7	
6	Everton	7	3	0	4	11	11	0	6	
7	Lota Schwager	7	1	1	5	8	17	−9	3	
8	Green Cross Temuco	7	0	0	7	5	18	−13	0	

Home \ Away	COLO	DCON	EVER	GCRT	LSCH	UESP	UCAT	UCHI
Colo-Colo		3–2	3–1	2–1	4–1	0–1	5–2	2–1
Concepción				3–0	1–1			
Everton		0–1		3–0	3–2			
Green Cross T.								
Lota S.				3–2				
U. Española		3–0	1–2	5–2	2–0			
U. Católica		4–6	2–1	1–0	2–0	0–3		
U. de Chile		2–0	2–1	1–0	3–1	1–2	1–2	

Legend: Blue = home team win; Yellow = draw; Red = away team win.

=== Championship play-off ===
27 January 1971

Colo-Colo	2 – 1 (a.e.t.)	Unión Española
Beiruth 24', 110'		43' Pacheco

Estadio Nacional, Santiago
Attendance: 71,335
Referee: P. Reyes

Campeonato Profesional
1970 champion

10th title

=== Relegation play-off ===
Palestino	3–2	La Calera	4–0	1–1

Pos	Team	Pld	W	D	L	GF	GA	GD	Pts	Relegation
1	Unión La Calera	3	1	1	1	7	4	+3	3	
2	Palestino	3	1	1	1	4	7	−3	3	Relegated to 1971 Segunda División

== Top goalscorers ==
Rank	Name	Club	Goals
1	(Chile) Osvaldo Castro	Deportes Concepción	36
2	(Chile) Sergio Messen	Universidad Católica	28
3	(Paraguay) Eladio Zárate	Unión Española	21
4	(Brazil) Elson Beiruth	Colo-Colo	19
5	(Argentina) Oscar González	Green Cross Temuco	19
6	(Argentina) Óscar Fuentes	Palestino	19

== Copa Francisco Candelori ==
Played between the winners of the Torneo Metropolitano 1970 (Unión Española) and Torneo Provincial 1970 (Deportes Concepción).

5 August 1970	Deportes Concepción	1 – 0	Unión Española	Estadio Regional, Concepción
	Abellán 85'			Attendance: 15,967

26 August 1970	Unión Española	0 – 0	Deportes Concepción	Estadio Nacional, Santiago
				Attendance: 9,909

Deportes Concepción won the Copa Francisco Candelori
