= Christian Rudzki =

Argentine footballer (1946–2024)

Personal information
- Date of birth: 26 July 1946
- Place of birth: Czechoslovakia
- Date of death: 24 May 2024 (aged 77)
- Place of death: Argentina
- Position: Forward

Senior career*
Years	Team	Apps	(Gls)
–1968	Deportivo Español	22	(4)
1969–1971	Estudiantes	62	(10)
1972–1973	Hannover 96	4	(1)
- * Club domestic league appearances and goals

Christian Rudzki (26 July 1946 – 24 May 2024) was an Argentine professional footballer who played as a forward.

== Early life ==
Rudzki was born in 1946 in Czechoslovakia and moved to Argentine in 1960.

== Career ==
Rudzki started his career with Argentine side Deportivo Español. In 1969, he signed for Argentine side Estudiantes, helping the club win the 1969 Copa Libertadores and 1970 Copa Libertadores, becoming the first European-born player to win the Copa Libertadores. He was regarded as an important goalscorer for the club. In 1972, he signed for Bundesliga side Hannover 96, becoming the first Argentine player to play in the Bundesliga, but he was regarded as unable to establish himself as an important player for the club.

== Death ==
Rudzki died on 24 May 2024, at the age of 77.
