= Ángel Brunell =

Uruguayan footballer (born 1945)

Ángel Brunel
Personal information
- Full name: Ángel Oscar Brunel Sosa
- Date of birth: February 2, 1945 (age 81)
- Place of birth: Tacuarembó, Uruguay
- Position: Defender

Youth career
- 1962–1963: Wanderers Tacuarembó

Senior career*
Years	Team	Apps	(Gls)
1964-1968	Danubio		
1969-1973	Nacional	83	(0)
1973-1975	Fluminense		
1976	Everton	30	(2)
1977-1978	Colo-Colo	28	(2)
1979	Everton	27	(0)
1980	Rentistas		

International career
1968	Uruguay MNT	1	(0)

Managerial career
- Rentistas
- Tacuarembó
- * Club domestic league appearances and goals

Ángel Oscar Brunel Sosa (born February 2, 1945, in Tacuarembó, Uruguay) is a Uruguayan former footballer who played as a defender for clubs in Uruguay, Brazil and Chile.

== Teams (Player) ==
- Danubio 1964–1968
- Nacional 1968–1972
- Fluminense 1973–1975
- Everton 1976
- Colo-Colo 1977–1978
- Everton 1979
- Rentistas 1980

== Teams (Head coach) ==
- Rentistas
- Tacuarembó

== Honours ==
Nacional

- Uruguayan Primera División: 1969, 1970, 1971 and 1972
- Copa Libertadores
- Intercontinental Cup: 1971
- Interamericana Cup: 1972

Everton

- Chilean Primera División: 1976

Colo-Colo

- Chilean Primera División: 1979
