= Juan Mujica =

Uruguayan footballer and manager (1943-2016)

Juan Martín Mugica
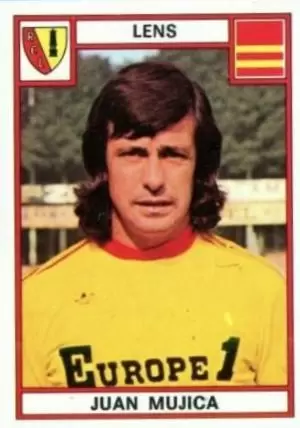
- Mugica playing for Lens

Personal information
- Full name: Juan Martín Mugica Ferreira
- Date of birth: 22 December 1943
- Place of birth: Casa Blanca, Uruguay
- Date of death: 11 February 2016 (aged 72)
- Place of death: Montevideo, Uruguay
- Position: Defender

Senior career*
Years	Team	Apps	(Gls)
1962–1967	Rampla Juniors		
1967–1971	Nacional		
1973–1975	Lille	51	(10)
1975–1978	Lens	36	(4)
1978	Liverpool MVD		
1979	Defensor Sporting		

International career
1966–1970	Uruguay	22	(2)

Managerial career
- 1980: Nacional
- 1983: Millonarios
- 1985: Atlético Nacional
- 1989: Racing
- 1997: Deportes Tolima
- 1997: Grêmio
- 1995: Saprissa
- 1998–1999: Alajuelense
- 2003–2004: Alianza
- * Club domestic league appearances and goals

Juan Martín Mugica Ferreira (also spelled Mujica, 22 December 1943 – 11 February 2016) was a Uruguayan football player and manager who played as a defender. He represented his country at the 1970 FIFA World Cup.

== Playing career ==
=== Club career ===
Mugica played club football for Rampla Juniors, Nacional, Lille OSC, RC Lens, Liverpool de Montevideo and Defensor Sporting.

=== International career ===
Mugica made 22 appearances for the Uruguay national football team between 1966 and 1970, scoring 2 goals.

== Honours ==
=== As a player ===
Nacional

- Uruguayan Primera División
  - Champion (3): 1969, 1970, 1971
- Copa Libertadores
  - Champion (1): 1971
- Intercontinental Cup
  - Champion (1): 1971

Uruguay

- South American Championship: 1967

=== Club ===
Alianza F.C.

- Primera División
  - Champion: Clausura 2004

Nacional

- Uruguayan Primera División
  - Champion (1): 1980
- Copa Libertadores
  - Champion (1): 1980
- Intercontinental Cup
  - Champion (1): 1980

Grêmio

- Trofeo Colombino
  - Champion (1): 1997
