= Carlos Blanco (baseball) =

Cuban baseball player (born 1914)

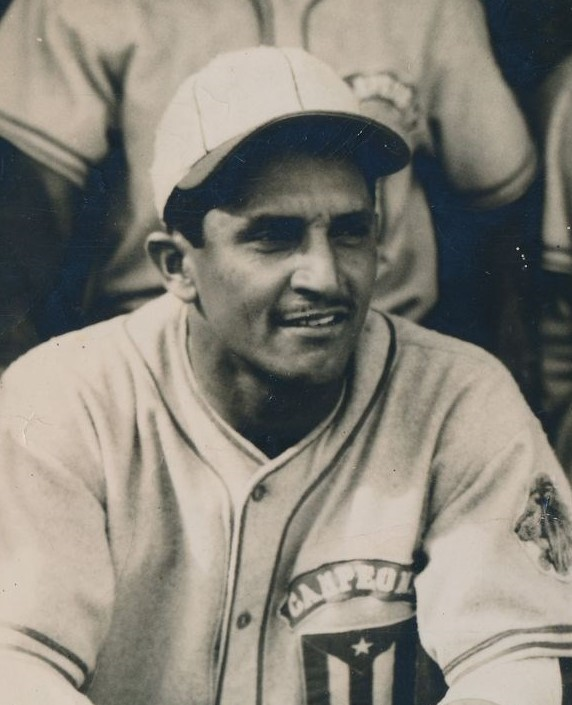
- First baseman
- Born: April 25, 1914; Bayamo, Cuba
- Died: 1997; Cuba

Negro league baseball debut
- 1941, for the New York Cubans

Last appearance
- 1941, for the New York Cubans
- Stats at Baseball Reference

Teams
- New York Cubans (1941)

Carlos E. Blanco (April 25, 1914 – 1997) was a Cuban Negro league first baseman.

A native of Bayamo, Cuba, Blanco is the older brother of fellow-Negro leaguer Heberto Blanco. He played for the New York Cubans in 1941, and went on to spend several years in the Mexican League through the mid-1950s.
