= 1970 Campeonato Ecuatoriano de Fútbol Serie A =

Ecuadorian Serie A
- Season: 1970
- Champions: Barcelona

The 1970 Campeonato Ecuatoriano de Fútbol Serie A, the first division of Ecuadorian football (soccer), was played by 13 teams. The champion was Barcelona.

== First stage ==
Pos	Team	Pld	W	D	L	GF	GA	GD	Pts	Qualification
1	Barcelona	24	14	6	4	33	17	+16	34	Qualified to the Liguilla Final
2	LDU Quito	24	11	6	7	37	26	+11	28	Qualified to the Liguilla Final
3	América de Quito	24	9	10	5	30	27	+3	28	Qualified to the Liguilla Final
4	Emelec	24	9	9	6	28	24	+4	27	Qualified to the Liguilla Final
5	Deportivo Quito	24	10	6	8	26	25	+1	26	Qualified to the Liguilla Final
6	El Nacional	24	9	7	8	40	30	+10	25	Qualified to the Liguilla Final
7	LDU Portoviejo	24	9	6	9	34	37	−3	24	Qualified to the Liguilla del No Descenso
8	Aucas	24	6	10	8	31	30	+1	22	Qualified to the Liguilla del No Descenso
9	Universidad Católica	24	7	8	9	22	22	0	22	Qualified to the Liguilla del No Descenso
10	Macará	24	6	10	8	27	31	−4	22	Qualified to the Liguilla del No Descenso
11	9 de Octubre	24	5	10	9	23	32	−9	20	Qualified to the Liguilla del No Descenso
12	Patria	24	5	8	11	18	31	−13	18	Qualified to the Liguilla del No Descenso
13	Everest	24	4	8	12	25	42	−17	16	Qualified to the Liguilla del No Descenso

Source: RSSSF - 1970 Serie A

Home \ Away	9DO	CDA	SDA	BSC	SDQ	EN	CSE	CDE	LDP	LDQ	MAC	CSP	UC
9 de Octubre		1–1	0–0	0–1	1–0	0–0	6–3	1–1	1–3	0–0	1–1	1–0	1–0
América de Quito	1–0		0–1	1–1	0–0	1–4	1–0	5–0	5–2	1–0	1–0	1–1	3–1
Aucas	1–1	2–2		2–3	0–2	1–1	3–1	0–0	3–3	2–3	3–1	4–0	1–1
Barcelona	4–0	0–0	0–1		1–0	4–0	0–0	1–0	3–2	1–0	1–1	2–1	2–1
Deportivo Quito	1–0	2–0	2–1	1–0		1–5	0–0	2–2	2–1	3–1	2–2	1–0	1–1
El Nacional	3–0	5–0	1–1	3–4	0–1		1–1	1–0	3–3	2–2	1–1	2–0	2–0
Emelec	2–2	2–0	2–0	1–2	3–1	2–0		4–2	0–2	2–0	2–1	0–0	0–0
Everest	4–3	0–1	1–0	0–0	1–0	0–2	1–1		5–1	0–1	2–2	1–2	0–0
LDU Portoviejo	1–2	0–0	1–1	0–1	2–1	1–0	0–1	2–0		3–1	3–2	0–0	1–0
LDU Quito	2–0	1–1	1–1	1–0	0–2	1–3	2–0	6–2	3–0		2–0	4–1	1–0
Macará	2–2	2–2	0–1	1–0	2–1	1–0	0–0	2–1	0–1	2–2		1–0	1–0
Patria	0–0	1–1	1–0	0–1	2–0	3–1	0–1	2–2	1–1	0–3	1–1		2–1
Universidad Católica	1–0	1–2	3–2	1–1	0–0	2–0	0–0	3–0	2–1	0–0	2–1	2–0	

Source: RSSSF - 1970 Serie A
Legend: Blue = home team win; Yellow = draw; Red = away team win.

== Liguilla de no descenso ==
Pos	Team	Pld	W	D	L	GF	GA	GD	Pts	Relegation
1	Universidad Católica	36	12	13	11	46	34	+12	37	
2	Aucas	36	11	14	11	50	44	+6	36	Relegated (Note: Aucas and Politécnico (second division champion) played a play-off match to decide which team is relegated to the second division)
3	Macará	36	11	13	12	45	41	+4	35	
4	LDU Portoviejo (Note: L.D.U. Portoviejo remained in Serie A by decision)	36	12	9	15	48	57	−9	33	
5	9 de Octubre	36	9	13	14	41	54	−13	31	
6	Patria	36	8	12	16	30	49	−19	28	Relegated
7	Everest	36	9	10	17	42	68	−26	28	Relegated

Source: RSSSF - 1970 Serie A
Notes:

Home \ Away	9DO	SDA	CDE	LDP	MAC	CSP	UC
9 de Octubre		0–0	5–3	2–0	1–1	0–1	0–0
Aucas	5–1		1–0	1–1	1–0	2–1	3–3
Everest	2–1	2–4		1–0	3–2	2–2	1–1
LDU Portoviejo	2–0	4–2	0–1		1–1	4–0	2–2
Macará	0–1	1–0	2–0	8–0		2–0	1–0
Patria	3–5	0–0	1–2	1–0	0–0		2–0
Universidad Católica	5–2	1–1	7–0	1–0	3–0	1–1	

Source: RSSSF - 1970 Serie A
Legend: Blue = home team win; Yellow = draw; Red = away team win.

== Liguilla Final ==
Pos	Team	Pld	W	D	L	GF	GA	GD	Pts	Qualification
1	Barcelona	34	19	7	8	44	31	+13	45	Champions and Qualified to the 1971 Copa Libertadores
2	Emelec	34	14	11	9	47	32	+15	39	Qualified to the 1971 Copa Libertadores
3	América de Quito	34	13	13	8	38	35	+3	39	
4	LDU Quito	34	14	8	12	51	45	+6	36	
5	El Nacional	34	13	9	12	54	42	+12	35	
6	Deportivo Quito	34	13	8	13	32	36	−4	34	

Source: RSSSF - 1970 Serie A

Home \ Away	CDA	BSC	SDQ	EN	CSE	LDQ
América de Quito		2–1	0–0	1–1	2–0	1–0
Barcelona	1–0		2–0	2–1	1–0	3–2
Deportivo Quito	0–1	1–0		2–0	0–0	3–2
El Nacional	2–0	3–0	2–0		2–0	0–3
Emelec	2–0	4–0	2–0	2–2		6–1
LDU Quito	1–1	1–1	2–0	2–1	0–3	

Source: RSSSF - 1970 Serie A
Legend: Blue = home team win; Yellow = draw; Red = away team win.
