= Washington Etchamendi =

Uruguayan football manager (1921-1976)

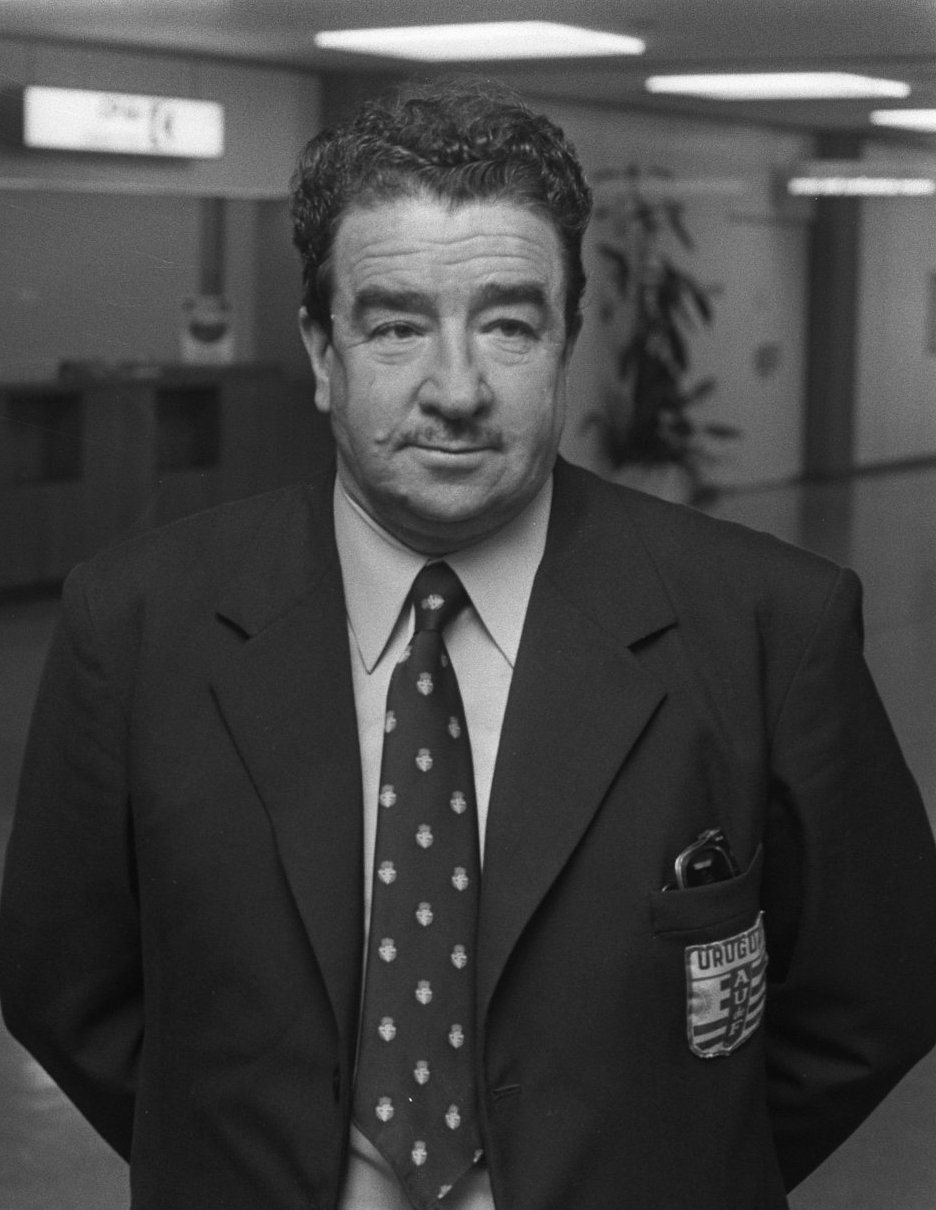
- Etchamendi in 1972

Personal information
- Full name: Washington Etchamendi Sosa
- Date of birth: 2 March 1921
- Place of birth: Soto, Uruguay
- Date of death: 30 May 1976 (aged 55)
- Place of death: Cali, Colombia

Managerial career
- Years: Team
- Canillitas
- Progreso
- Defensor Sporting
- 1963: Uruguay
- Liverpool Montevideo
- 1965: Colón
- 1965–1966: Unión de Santa Fe
- Cerro
- 1969: Los Andes
- 1969: Bella Vista
- 1970–1972: Nacional
- 1972: Uruguay
- 1973: Paraguay
- Montevideo Wanderers
- 1973–1975: Bella Vista
- 1976: Deportivo Cali

Washington Etchamendi Sosa (2 March 1921 — 30 May 1976) was a Uruguayan football manager, who notably managed Nacional in 1971.

== Career ==
Born in Soto, Paysandú Department, Etchamendi began his career with Club Canillitas, and later went on to manage Progreso, Defensor Sporting and Liverpool Montevideo before moving to Argentina in 1965. He also took over Colón (where he was manager for just a week), Unión de Santa Fe and Los Andes in that country before moving back to Uruguay.

In 1970, after an impressive year in charge of Bella Vista, Etchamendi was named Nacional manager. He led the latter club to three Primera División titles (1970, 1971, 1972), aside from winning the 1971 Copa Libertadores and the 1971 Intercontinental Cup.

After leaving Nacional at the end of the 1972 season, Etchamendi subsequently worked at the Paraguay national team, Montevideo Wanderers, Bella Vista, Club León and Deportivo Cali.

== Death ==
On 30 May 1976, while managing Deportivo Cali, Etchamendi suffered a myocardial infarction during the second half of a home fixture against Independiente Santa Fe. Despite being aided by nearby people, he was declared dead 30 minutes after the incident.

== Honours ==
Nacional

- Uruguayan Primera División: 1970, 1971, 1972
- Copa Libertadores: 1971
- Intercontinental Cup: 1971
