= Luis Artime =

Argentine footballer (born 1938)

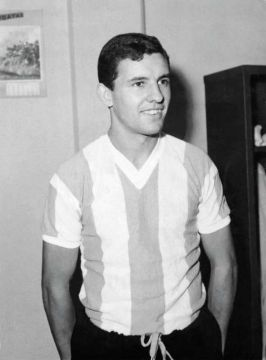
- Artime with Argentina national team in 1967

Personal information
- Date of birth: 2 December 1938 (age 87)
- Place of birth: Parque Civit, Argentina
- Height: 1.74 m (5 ft 9 in)
- Position: Striker

Senior career*
| Years | Team | Apps | (Gls) |
| 1959–1961 | Atlanta | 67 | (50) |
| 1961–1965 | River Plate | 80 | (68) |
| 1965–1967 | Independiente | 72 | (45) |
| 1968–1969 | Palmeiras | 16 | (11) |
| 1969–1971 | Nacional | 56 | (61) |
| 1972 | Fluminense | 5 | (0) |
| 1973–1974 | Nacional | 10 | (4) |
| Total | | 306 | (239) |

International career
| 1961–1967 | Argentina | 25 | (24) |

Managerial career
- 1975: Atlético Tucumán
- 1979–1980: Atlanta
- 1983: Club Renato Cesarini
- * Club domestic league appearances and goals

Luis Artime (born 2 December 1938) is an Argentine former footballer, who played as a striker. His son Luis Fabián Artime is also a retired Argentine footballer who played in the 1990s.

== Club career ==
Artime was born in Parque Civit in Mendoza Province. He had a remarkably successful career in club football, he was top scorer four times in the Argentine league, three times in the Uruguayan league and once in the Copa Libertadores. He won one Argentine league title, three Uruguayan league titles and the Copa Libertadores in 1971.

Artime started his career at Club Atlético Atlanta but in 1962 he was transferred to Argentine giants River Plate where he became the top scorer in Argentina on three occasions. In 1966 he moved to Independiente where he helped the team to win the Nacional 1967, he was also topscorer in the tournament.

In 1969, Artime moved to Brazil to play for Palmeiras, but he did not stay long, and soon left to join Nacional of Uruguay. His first spell at Nacional was the most productive of his career; he won three Urugauyan league titles in a row, topscoring in each tournament, and in 1971 he helped the team to win the Copa Libertadores.

In 1972, Artime tried his luck in Brazil for a second time, but returned to Nacional in Uruguay after only one season at Fluminense. His second spell at Nacional was overshadowed by the successes of eternal rivals Peñarol. Artime retired from football in 1974.

== International career ==
Playing for the Argentina national team, Artime scored 24 goals in 25 caps, making him Argentina's 9th highest goalscorer to date. His strike rate of 0.96 goals per game for Argentina also makes him one of the most prolific goalscorers in Argentine international football. He played at the 1966 FIFA World Cup and at the South American Championship 1967, where he was the top goalscorer.

== Honours ==
Independiente

- Argentine Primera División: 1967 Nacional

Palmeiras

- Campeonato Brasileiro: 1969
- Campeonato Paulista runner-up: 1969

Nacional

- Uruguayan Primera División: 1969, 1970, 1971
- Copa Libertadores: 1971
- Intercontinental Cup: 1971

Argentina

- Taça das Nações: 1964

Individual

- Argentine Primera División top scorer: 1962 (25 goals), 1963 (24 goals), 1966 (23 goals), Nacional 1967 (11 goals)
- South American Championship top scorer: 1967 (5 goals)
- Primera División Uruguaya top scorer: 1969 (24 goals), 1970 (21 goals), 1971 (16 goals)
- Copa Libertadores top scorer: 1971 (10 goals)
- Copa Intercontinental top scorer: 1971 (3 goals)
- South American Footballer of the Year Bronze Award: 1971
- IFFHS Argentina All Times Dream Team (Team C): 2021
