= Manga (footballer, born 1937) =

Brazilian footballer (1937–2025)

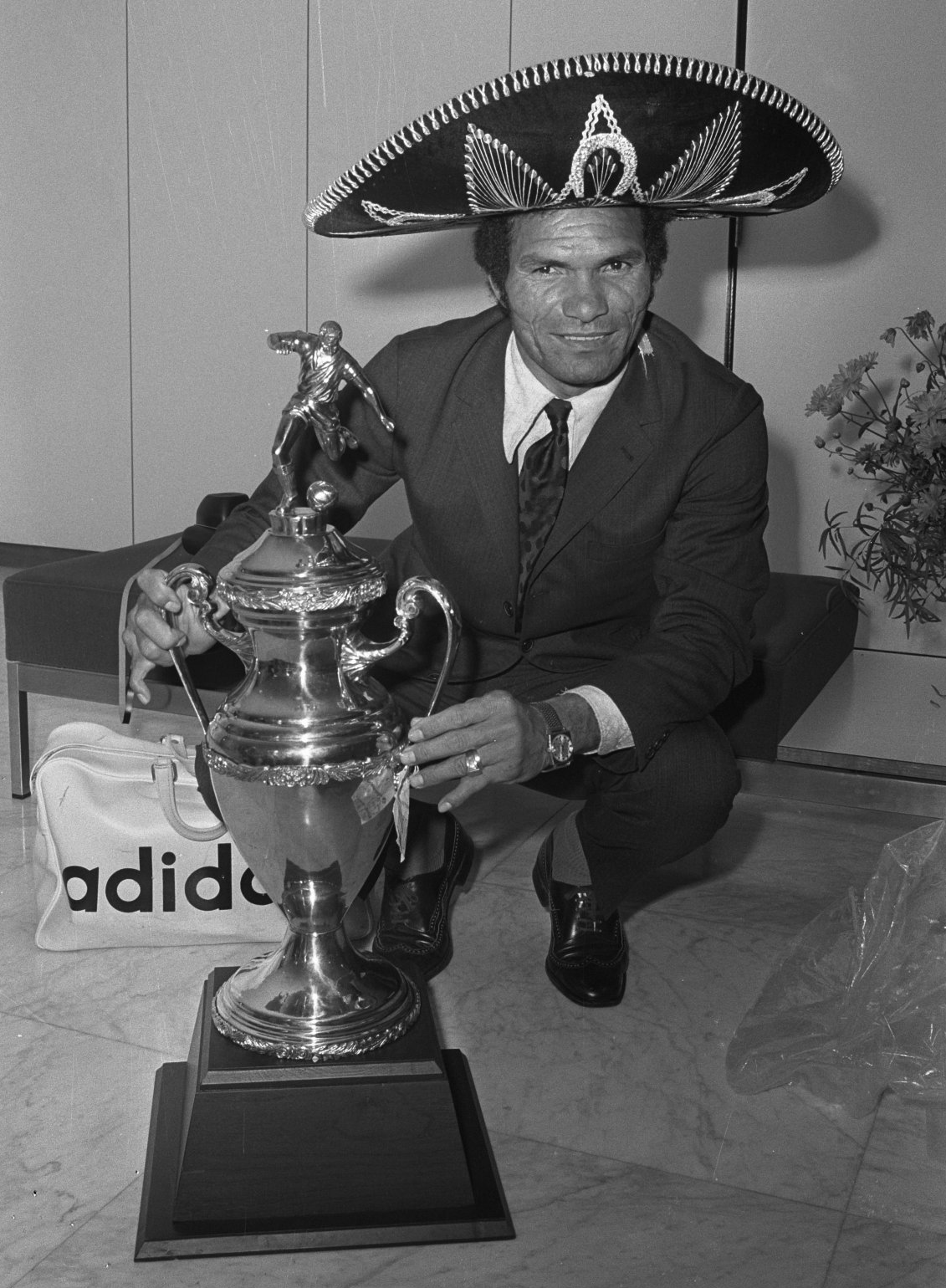
- Manga in 1971

Personal information
- Full name: Haílton Corrêa de Arruda
- Date of birth: April 26, 1937
- Place of birth: Recife, Pernambuco, Brazil
- Date of death: April 8, 2025 (aged 87)
- Place of death: Rio de Janeiro, Brazil
- Position: Goalkeeper

Youth career
- 1954: Sport Recife

Senior career*
Years	Team	Apps	(Gls)
1955–1959	Sport Recife	?	(0)
1959–1968	Botafogo	442	(0)
1969–1974	Nacional	340	(1)
1974–1976	Internacional	52	(0)
1977–1978	Operário-MS	36	(0)
1978	Coritiba	?	(0)
1979–1980	Grêmio	15	(0)
1981–1982	Barcelona de Guayaquil	?	(0)

International career
1965–1967	Brazil	12	(0)
- * Club domestic league appearances and goals

Haílton Corrêa de Arruda (April 26, 1937 – April 8, 2025), best known as Manga, was a Brazilian footballer who played as a goalkeeper for Botafogo in the 1960s and won the Copa Libertadores and the Intercontinental Cup in 1971 with Nacional. He was the starting keeper in the Brazil national team in the 1966 FIFA World Cup.

== Career ==
Manga started his career in 1955 in Sport Recife. In 1959 he moved to Botafogo, where he became a national celebrity. In 1966 he was the Brazilian goalkeeper in the 1966 FIFA World Cup. In the 1970s he also played for Sport Club Internacional (where he won two national titles), Coritiba and Grêmio. He also played in Uruguay and Ecuador, where he finished his career at the age of 44.

== Death ==
On April 8, 2025, Manga died at Rio Barra Hospital in Rio de Janeiro. He was 87.

== Honours ==
Below is a list of the main titles won by Manga, including 25 official tournaments:

Sport Recife

- Campeonato Pernambucano: 1955, 1956, 1957

Botafogo

- Campeonato Carioca: 1961, 1962, 1967, 1968
- Taça dos Campeões Estaduais Rio-São Paulo: 1961
- Torneio Rio-São Paulo: 1962, 1964, 1966
- Tournoi de Paris: 1963
- Taça Guanabara: 1967, 1968
- Troféu Triangular de Caracas: 1967

Nacional

- Primera División Uruguaya: 1969, 1970, 1971, 1972
- Copa Libertadores: 1971
- Intercontinental Cup: 1971
- Copa Interamericana: 1971

Internacional

- Campeonato Gaúcho: 1974, 1975, 1976
- Campeonato Brasileiro: 1975, 1976

Operário de Campo Grande

- Campeonato Matogrossense: 1977

Coritiba

- Campeonato Paranaense: 1978

Grêmio

- Campeonato Gaúcho: 1979

Barcelona SC

- Campeonato Ecuatoriano: 1981

Individual

- Bola de Prata: 1976, 1978
- Botafogo FR Team of 20th Century
