= Atilio Ancheta =

Uruguayan footballer (born 1948)

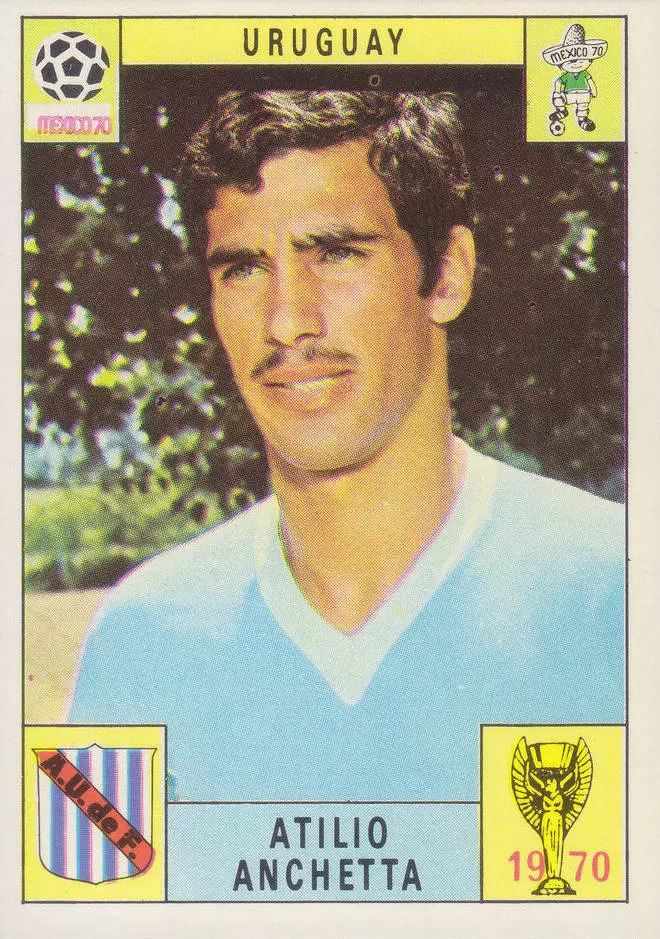
- Ancheta in 1970

Personal information
- Full name: Atilio Genaro Ancheta Weigel
- Date of birth: 19 July 1948 (age 78)
- Place of birth: Florida, Uruguay
- Position: Defender

Senior career*
| Years | Team | Apps | (Gls) |
| 1965–1971 | Nacional | | |
| 1971–1979 | Grêmio | 164 | (7) |
| 1980–1981 | Millonarios | | |
| 1982–1983 | Nacional | | |

International career
| 1969–1971 | Uruguay | 20 | (2) |
- * Club domestic league appearances and goals

Atilio Genaro Ancheta Weigel (born 19 July 1948) is a singer and former footballer from Uruguay, who played for the national team at the 1970 FIFA World Cup.

== Career ==
He was a defender and spent most of his career with Grêmio Football Porto-Alegrense, appearing in 164 Campeonato Brasileiro Série A matches. In 1973, he was the first recipient of the Brazilian Bola de Ouro award alongside fellow expatriate, Santos goalkeeper Agustín Cejas.

Ancheta made 20 appearances for the Uruguay national football team from 1969 to 1971.

In 2022, Ancheta was a contestant at the Brazilian talent show The Voice +.

== Honours ==
Club Nacional

- Uruguayan league: 1969, 1970, 1971
- Copa Libertadores: 1971

Grêmio

- "Campeonato Gaúcho" (Rio Grande do Sul State Championship): 1977, 1979

Individual

- FIFA World Cup All-Star Team: 1970
- Bola de Prata: 1973
- Bola de Ouro: 1973
