= Luis Ubiña =

Uruguayan footballer (1940-2013)

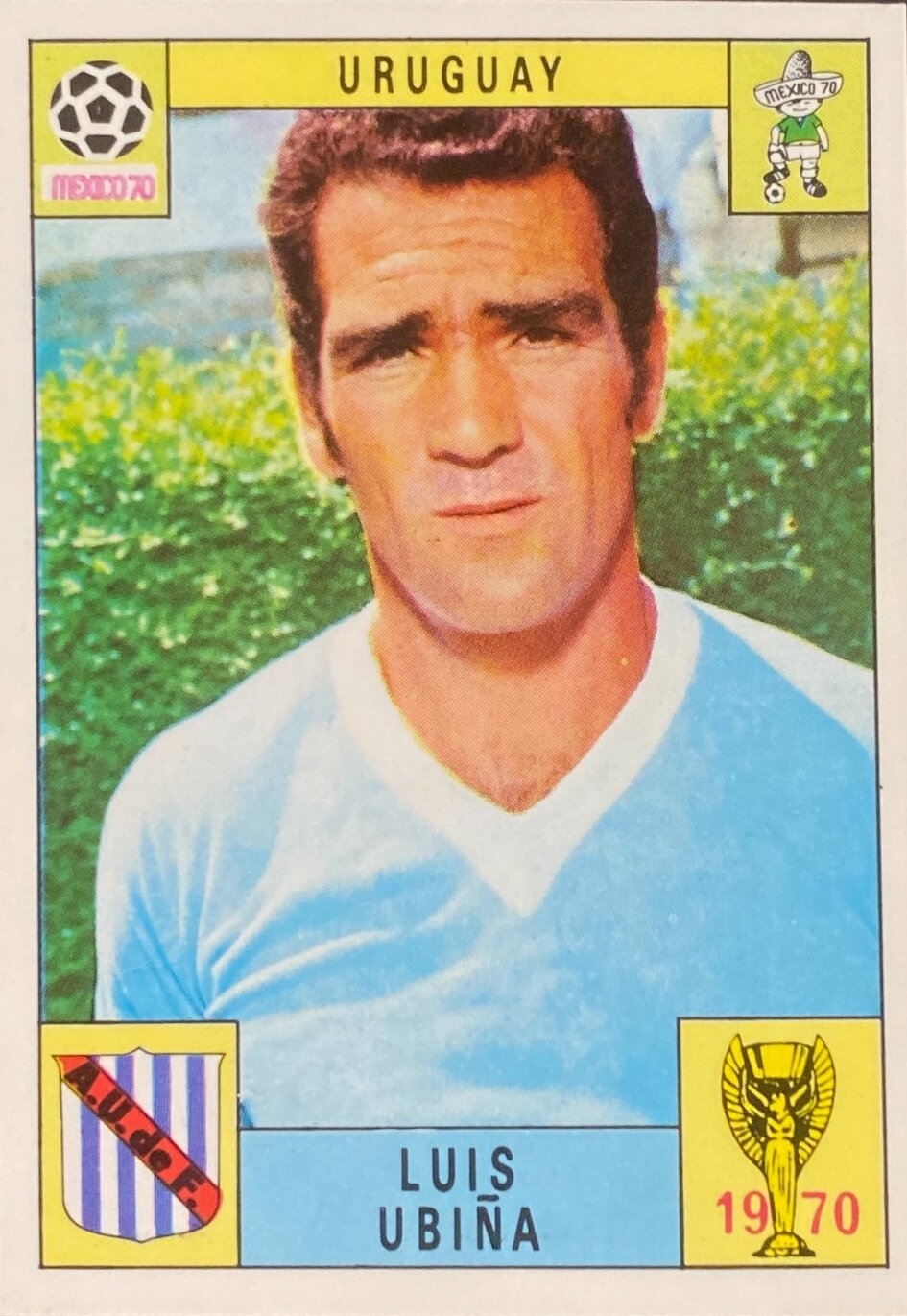
- Ubiña in 1970

Personal information
- Full name: Luis Ignacio Ubiña Olivera
- Date of birth: 7 June 1940
- Place of birth: Montevideo, Montevideo Department, Uruguay
- Date of death: 17 July 2013 (aged 73)
- Place of death: Montevideo, Montevideo Department, Uruguay
- Height: 1.78 m (5 ft 10 in)
- Position: Defender

Senior career*
Years	Team	Apps	(Gls)
1960–1968	Rampla Juniors		
1969–1973	Nacional		

International career
1965–1973	Uruguay	33	(1)
- * Club domestic league appearances and goals

Luis Ignacio Ubiña Olivera (7 June 1940 – 17 July 2013) was a Uruguayan football defender, who played for the Uruguay national team between 1965 and 1973. He was part of the Uruguay squad for the 1966 and 1970 world cups.

At club level, Ubiña played for Rampla Juniors and Nacional.
