= Víctor Espárrago =

Uruguayan footballer and coach (born 1944)

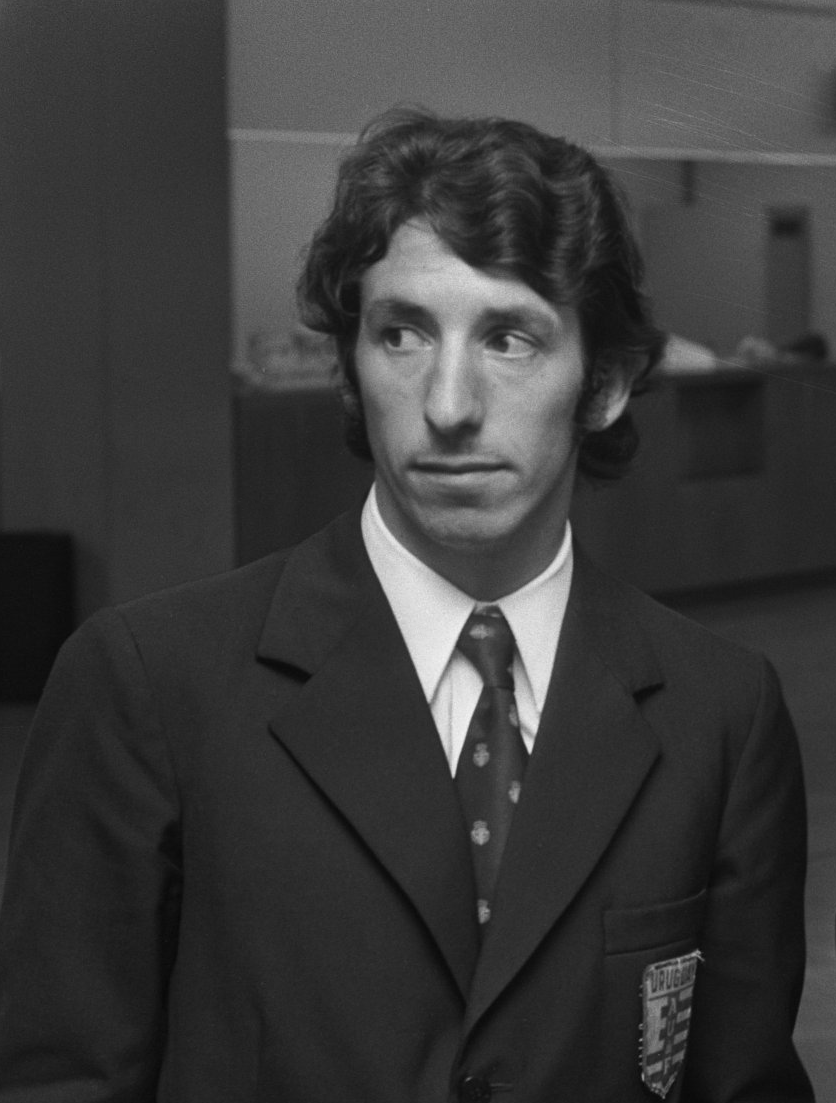
- Espárrago in 1972

Personal information
- Full name: Víctor Rodolfo Espárrago Videla
- Date of birth: 6 October 1944 (age 82)
- Place of birth: Montevideo, Uruguay
- Position: Midfielder

Senior career*
Years	Team	Apps	(Gls)
1963	Danubio		
1964–1965	Cerro		
1966–1973	Nacional	213	(55)
1973–1975	Sevilla	55	(1)
1975–1979	Recreativo	93	(4)
1979–1981	Nacional		

International career
1966–1974	Uruguay	40	(1)

Managerial career
- 1985–1987: Recreativo
- 1987–1988: Cádiz
- 1988–1991: Valencia
- 1991–1992: Sevilla
- 1992–1994: Albacete
- 1994: Real Valladolid
- 1996: Sevilla
- 1996–1997: Real Zaragoza
- 2004–2006: Cádiz
- 2010: Cádiz
- * Club domestic league appearances and goals

Víctor Rodolfo Espárrago Videla (born 6 October 1944 in Montevideo) is a Uruguayan football coach and former midfielder.

== International career ==
He was capped 67 times for the national team between 1966 and 1974. His playing career highlight came when he was an important member of the Uruguayan squad which achieved fourth place at the 1970 FIFA World Cup.

In that tournament, he scored a winning goal in extra-time of the quarter-final against the USSR, his only goal for the Celeste in official matches.

== Coaching career ==
He coached several teams in Spain since 1985. On 1 July 2004, he became head coach of Cádiz, which was also the first team he coached in the Spanish first division. On 10 January 2010, after Javi Gracia was sacked following a 4-1 defeat by Real Sociedad, Cádiz hired him as their new manager.

== Coaching career summary ==
- Recreativo (1985–1987)
- Cádiz (1987–1988)
- Valencia (1988–1991)
- Sevilla (1991–1992)
- Albacete (1992–1994)
- Real Valladolid (1994–1995)
- Sevilla (1995–1996)
- Real Zaragoza (1996–1997)
- Cádiz (2004–2006)
- Cádiz (2010)
