= Ildo Maneiro =

Uruguayan footballer (born 1947)

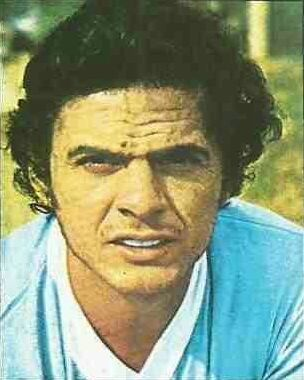
- Maneiro in the 1974 FIFA World Cup

Personal information
- Full name: Ildo Enrique Maneiro Ghezzi
- Date of birth: 4 August 1947 (age 79)
- Place of birth: Mercedes, Uruguay
- Position: Midfielder

Senior career*
Years	Team	Apps	(Gls)
1966–1973	Nacional	256	(32)
1973–1976	Lyon	85	(13)
1976–1979	C.A. Peñarol	104	(27)

International career
1970–1979	Uruguay	33	(3)

Managerial career
- 1990–1991: Real Zaragoza
- 1993–1994: Uruguay
- 1994: Colón
- 2003: Herediano
- * Club domestic league appearances and goals

Ildo Enrique Maneiro Ghezzi (born 4 August 1947) is a Uruguayan former professional football (soccer) player and manager.

He played as a midfielder for Uruguay at the 1970 FIFA World Cup, Nacional, Lyon and C.A. Peñarol. He capped 33 times for his country, scoring 3 goals.

He went on to become coach of Real Zaragoza.
