= Juan Carlos Blanco (footballer, born 1946) =

Uruguayan footballer

Personal information
- Full name: Juan Carlos Blanco Peñalva
- Date of birth: 26 May 1946 (age 80)
- Place of birth: Dolores, Uruguay
- Height: 1.85 m (6 ft 1 in)
- Position: Defender

Senior career*
Years	Team	Apps	(Gls)
1967–1973	Nacional		
1974–1978	Real Zaragoza		
1979–1982	Nacional		
1983	Racing		

International career
1971–1981	Uruguay	10	(0)
- * Club domestic league appearances and goals

Juan Carlos Blanco Peñalva (8 May 1946) is a former Uruguayan footballer. He represented Uruguay national football team.

== Career ==
As a footballer, he played as a full-back on both sides and as a centre-back. He started playing for Club Atlético San Salvador in Soriano, and in 1963 he joined the youth divisions of Club Nacional de Football, where he made his official debut in 1966. In his first stage with Nacional, he won the Copa Libertadores in 1971, the Copa Intercontinental, and the Copa Interamericana in 1972, in addition to obtaining the four-year championship in the Uruguayan league (1969, 1970, 1971, and 1972).

In 1973, he moved to Real Zaragoza in Spain, where he played until 1978, during a period in which the Spanish club had several South American players (mainly Paraguayans), which led to it being remembered as "Los Zaraguayos". These teams did not win any titles, but they did achieve the best performances in the club's history in the top division, finishing third in the 1973–74 season and second in the 1974–75 season.

In 1978, he returned to Nacional, achieving the triple crown in 1980 (Uruguayan Championship, Copa Libertadores, and Copa Intercontinental). In 1982, he joined Racing, where he retired. He played for the Uruguayan national team on ten occasions between 1971 and 1981.

== Honours ==
Nacional

- Uruguayan Primera División: 1969, 1970, 1971, 1972, 1980
- Copa Libertadores: 1971, 1980
