= Julio Montero Castillo =

Uruguayan footballer (born 1944)

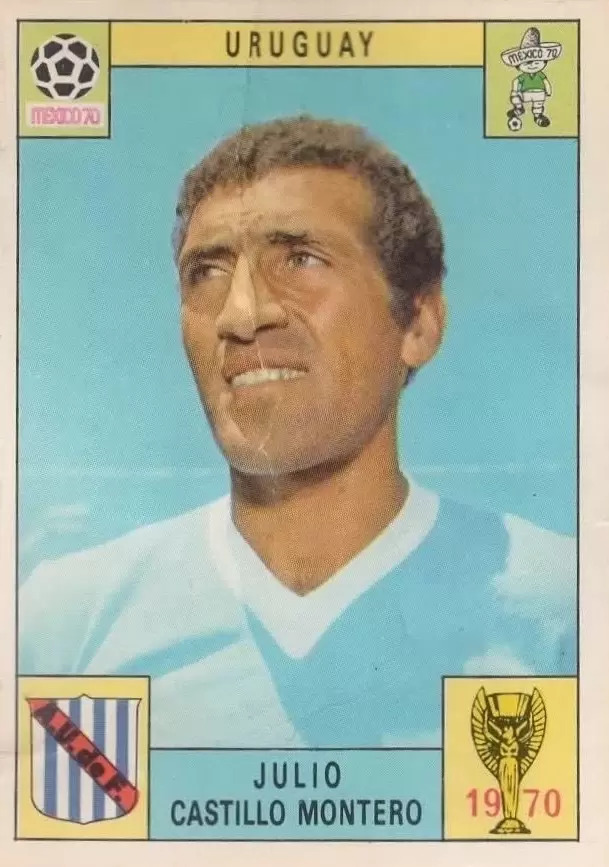
- Castillo in the 1970 FIFA World Cup

Personal information
- Full name: Julio Walter Montero Castillo
- Date of birth: 25 April 1944 (age 82)
- Place of birth: Montevideo, Uruguay
- Position: Defender

Senior career*
Years	Team	Apps	(Gls)
1964–1966	Liverpool Montevideo		
1966–1972	Nacional		
1973	CA Independiente	4	(0)
1973–1975	Granada	64	(2)

International career
1967–1974	Uruguay	44	(1)
- * Club domestic league appearances and goals

Julio Walter Montero Castillo (born 25 April 1944) is a Uruguayan former professional footballer who played as a defender.

== Career ==
Born in Montevideo, Montero Castillo started his career with Liverpool FC (Montevideo), before joining Nacional in 1966. He later played for Independiente of Argentina, and Spanish side Granada. He made 64 La Liga appearances for Granada between 1973 and 1975, scoring two goals.

He made a total of 68 Copa Libertadores appearances between 1966 and 1973.

He represented the Uruguay national team in the 1970 FIFA World Cup (playing in all six matches) and the 1974 FIFA World Cup. He 44 appearances in total, scoring one goal.

== Personal life ==
Montero Castillo is the father of the international footballer Paolo Montero.
