= 1970 Campeonato Uruguayo Primera División =

67th season of the top-tier football league in Uruguay

Statistics of Primera División Uruguaya for the 1970 season.

== Overview ==
It was contested by 11 teams, and Nacional won the championship.

== League standings ==
Pos	Team	Pld	W	D	L	GF	GA	GD	Pts
1	Nacional	20	18	1	1	48	12	+36	37
2	Peñarol	20	12	7	1	37	16	+21	31
3	Huracán Buceo	20	6	11	3	14	9	+5	23
4	Liverpool	20	8	6	6	20	15	+5	22
5	Defensor	20	6	7	7	18	22	−4	19
6	Cerro	20	5	9	6	17	21	−4	19
7	Bella Vista	20	2	12	6	22	29	−7	16
8	Sud América	20	3	8	9	14	26	−12	14
9	Rampla Juniors	20	3	8	9	11	26	−15	14
10	River Plate	20	4	5	11	16	24	−8	13
11	Racing Montevideo	20	2	8	10	21	38	−17	12

Source: rsssf.com

== Playoff ==
=== Champions ===
Pos	Team	Pld	W	D	L	GF	GA	GD	Pts
1	Nacional	5	3	2	0	12	6	+6	8
2	Huracán Buceo	5	3	1	1	7	2	+5	7
3	Peñarol	5	2	3	0	6	3	+3	7
4	Liverpool	5	1	3	1	6	8	−2	5
5	Cerro	5	1	0	4	12	16	−4	2
6	Bella Vista	5	0	1	4	7	15	−8	1

Source: rsssf.com

=== Relegation group ===
Pos	Team	Pld	W	D	L	GF	GA	GD	Pts
7	Sud América	4	2	2	0	4	1	+3	6
8	River Plate	4	2	1	1	6	5	+1	5
9	Racing Montevideo	4	1	3	0	3	2	+1	5
10	Defensor	4	1	1	2	2	2	0	3
11	Rampla Juniors	4	0	1	3	4	9	−5	1

Source: rsssf.com
