= 1971 Copa Libertadores =

12th season of Copa Libertadores

1971 Copa Libertadores de América 1971 Copa Libertadores da América

Tournament details
- Dates: February 13 - June 9
- Teams: 21 (from 10 confederations)

Final positions
- Champions: (Uruguay) Nacional (1st title)
- Runners-up: (Argentina) Estudiantes

Tournament statistics
- Matches played: 75
- Goals scored: 195 (2.6 per match)
- Top scorer: (Argentina) Luis Artime (10 goals)

The Copa Libertadores 1971 was the 12th edition of the Copa Libertadores, CONMEBOL's annual international club tournament. Nacional won the competition, defeating in the final the defending champions Estudiantes, who were seeking a fourth consecutive title.

== Qualified teams ==
Country	Team	Qualify method
CONMEBOL (1 berth)	Estudiantes	1970 Copa Libertadores champion
Argentina; 2 berths	Boca Juniors	1970 National Championship winners
Argentina; 2 berths	Rosario Central	1970 National Championship runners-up
Bolivia; 2 berths	Chaco Petrolero	1970 Bolivian Primera División winners
Bolivia; 2 berths	The Strongest	1970 Bolivian Primera División runners-up
Brazil; 2 berths	Fluminense	1970 Campeonato Brasileiro Série A winners
Brazil; 2 berths	Palmeiras	1970 Campeonato Brasileiro Série A runners-up
Chile; 2 berths	Colo-Colo	1970 Primera División winners
Chile; 2 berths	Unión Española	1970 Primera División runners-up
Colombia; 2 berths	Deportivo Cali	1970 Campeonato Profesional winners
Colombia; 2 berths	Junior	1970 Campeonato Profesional runners-up
Ecuador; 2 berths	Barcelona	1970 Ecuadorian Serie A winners
Ecuador; 2 berths	Emelec	1970 Ecuadorian Serie A runners-up
Paraguay; 2 berths	Cerro Porteño	1970 Primera División winners
Paraguay; 2 berths	Guaraní	1970 Primera División runners-up
Peru; 2 berths	Sporting Cristal	1970 Torneo Descentralizado winners
Peru; 2 berths	Universitario	1970 Torneo Descentralizado runners-up
Uruguay; 2 berths	Nacional	1970 Primera División winners
Uruguay; 2 berths	Peñarol	1970 Primera División runners-up
Venezuela; 2 berths	Deportivo Galicia	1970 Venezuelan Primera División winners
Venezuela; 2 berths	Deportivo Italia	1970 Venezuelan Primera División runners-up

== Draw ==
The champions and runners-up of each football association were drawn into the same group along with another football association's participating teams. Three clubs from Argentina competed as Estudiantes was champion of the 1970 Copa Libertadores. They entered the tournament in the Semifinals.

Group 1	Group 2	Group 3	Group 4	Group 5
Argentina; Peru	Bolivia; Uruguay	Brazil; Venezuela	Chile; Paraguay	Colombia; Ecuador

== Group Stage ==
=== Group 1 ===
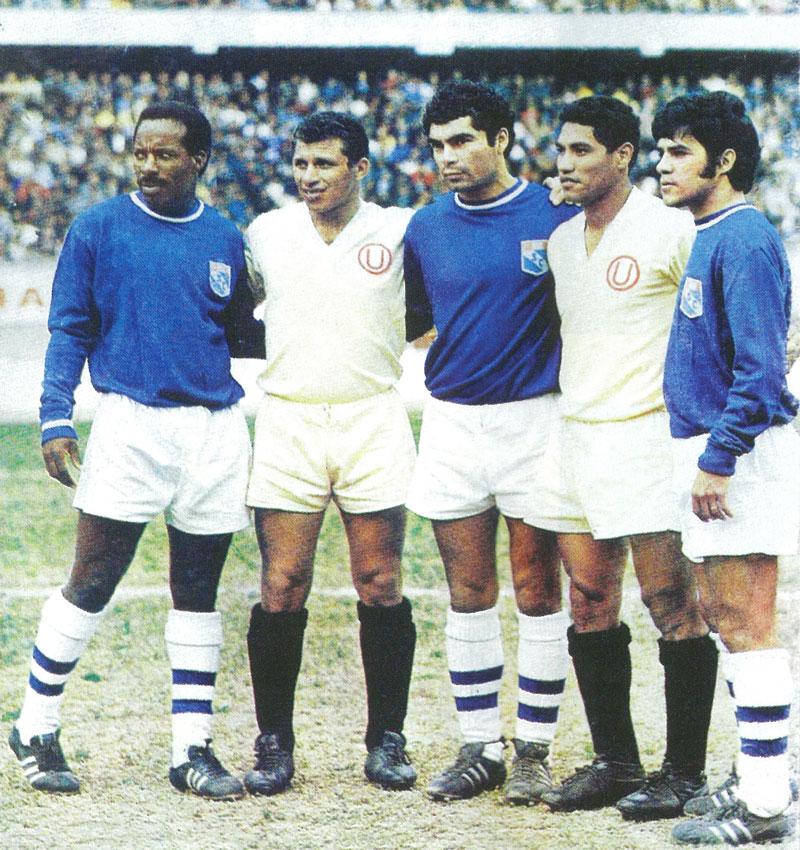
Players from Sporting Cristal and Universitario before their match. From left to right: Eloy Campos, Luis Cruzado, Orlando de la Torre, Pedro González and José del Castillo

Pos	Team	Pld	W	D	L	GF	GA	GD	Pts	Qualification or relegation	(Peru) UNI	(Argentina) ROS	(Argentina) BOC	(Peru) CRI
1	(Peru) Universitario	6	3	3	0	8	4	+4	9	Qualified to the Semifinals		3–2	0–0	3–0
2	(Argentina) Rosario Central	6	3	1	2	11	8	+3	7		2–2		w.o.	4–0
3	(Argentina) Boca Juniors	6	1	2	3	4	5	−1	4		w.o.	2–1		2–2
4	(Peru) Sporting Cristal	6	1	2	3	5	11	−6	4		0–0	1–2	2–0	

- The match between Boca Juniors and Sporting Cristobal on the 17th of March was abandoned after fighting resulted in three players being injured and sixteen arrested by police. Boca were removed from the competition, with their next two opponents receiving walk-over victories.

=== Group 2 ===
Pos	Team	Pld	W	D	L	GF	GA	GD	Pts	Qualification or relegation	(Uruguay) NAC	(Uruguay) PEÑ	(Bolivia) CHA	(Bolivia) STR
1	(Uruguay) Nacional	6	5	1	0	14	2	+12	11	Qualified to the Semifinals		2–1	3–0	5–0
2	(Uruguay) Peñarol	6	3	1	2	14	6	+8	7		0–2		1–0	9–0
3	(Bolivia) Chaco Petrolero	6	1	1	4	5	9	−4	3		0–1	1–1		1–2
4	(Bolivia) The Strongest	6	1	1	4	5	21	−16	3		1–1	1–2	1–3	

=== Group 3 ===
Pos	Team	Pld	W	D	L	GF	GA	GD	Pts	Qualification or relegation	(Brazil) PAL	(Brazil) FLU	(Venezuela) ITA	(Venezuela) GAL
1	(Brazil) Palmeiras	6	5	0	1	13	5	+8	10	Qualified to the Semifinals		0–2	1–0	3–0
2	(Brazil) Fluminense	6	4	0	2	16	6	+10	8		1–3		0–1	4–1
3	(Venezuela) Deportivo Italia	6	2	1	3	7	15	−8	5		0–3	0–6		3–2
4	(Venezuela) Deportivo Galicia	6	0	1	5	9	19	−10	1		2–3	1–3	3–3	

=== Group 4 ===
Pos	Team	Pld	W	D	L	GF	GA	GD	Pts	Qualification or relegation	(Chile) UES	(Chile) COL	(Paraguay) CER	(Paraguay) GUA
1	(Chile) Unión Española	6	2	3	1	7	6	+1	7	Qualified to the Semifinals		1–1	0–0	2–1
2	(Chile) Colo-Colo	6	1	4	1	5	5	0	6		1–2		1–0	3–2
3	(Paraguay) Cerro Porteño	6	2	2	2	6	7	−1	6		2–1	0–0		1–1
4	(Paraguay) Guaraní	6	1	3	2	9	9	0	5		1–1	2–0	2–2	

=== Group 5 ===
Pos	Team	Pld	W	D	L	GF	GA	GD	Pts	Qualification or relegation	(Ecuador) BAR	(Ecuador) EME	(Colombia) CAL	(Colombia) JUN
1	(Ecuador) Barcelona	6	3	1	2	8	6	+2	7	Qualified to the Semifinals		0–1	1–0	3–1
2	(Ecuador) Emelec	6	2	3	1	6	4	+2	7		1–1		3–1	1–1
3	(Colombia) Deportivo Cali	6	3	0	3	8	7	+1	6		3–1	1–0		2–0
4	(Colombia) Junior	6	1	2	3	4	9	−5	4		0–2	0–0	2–1	

==== Tiebreaker ====
Team 1	Score	Team 2
Barcelona (Ecuador)	3–0	(Ecuador) Emelec

== Semifinals ==
=== Group 1 ===
Pos	Team	Pld	W	D	L	GF	GA	GD	Pts	Qualification or relegation	(Uruguay) NAC	(Brazil) PAL	(Peru) UNI
1	(Uruguay) Nacional	4	3	1	0	9	1	+8	7	Qualified to the Final		3–1	3–0
2	(Brazil) Palmeiras	4	2	0	2	6	7	−1	4		0–3		3–0
3	(Peru) Universitario	4	0	1	3	1	8	−7	1		0–0	1–2	

=== Group 2 ===
Pos	Team	Pld	W	D	L	GF	GA	GD	Pts	Qualification or relegation	(Argentina) EST	(Ecuador) BAR	(Chile) UES
1	(Argentina) Estudiantes	4	3	0	1	4	2	+2	6	Qualified to the Final		0–1	2–1
2	(Ecuador) Barcelona	4	2	0	2	3	4	−1	4		0–1		1–0
3	(Chile) Unión Española	4	1	0	3	4	5	−1	2		0–1	3–1	

== Finals ==
May 26, 1971

Estudiantes (Argentina)	1 – 0	(Uruguay) Nacional

June 2, 1971

Nacional (Uruguay)	1 – 0	(Argentina) Estudiantes

Replay match at Estadio Nacional (Lima, Peru)

June 9, 1971

Nacional (Uruguay)	2 – 0	(Argentina) Estudiantes

Estadio Nacional, Peru

== Champion ==
Copa Libertadores
1971 Champions

Nacional
First Title

== See also ==
- Little Maracanazo
