= 1970 Copa Libertadores finals =

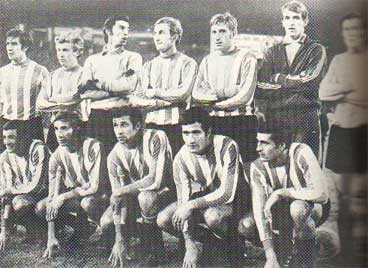
- Estudiantes LP, champions
- Event: 1970 Copa Libertadores
Estudiantes LP	Peñarol
(Argentina)	(Uruguay)
1	0
- Estudiantes won 1-0 on aggregate.

First leg
Estudiantes LP	Peñarol
1	0
- Date: May 21, 1970
- Venue: Estadio Estudiantes, La Plata
- Referee: Carlos Robles (Chile)
- Attendance: 40,000

Second leg
Peñarol	Estudiantes LP
0	0
- Date: May 27, 1970
- Venue: Estadio Centenario, Montevideo
- Referee: Larrosa (Uruguay)
- Attendance: 70,000

The 1970 Copa Libertadores finals were the two-legged final that decided the winner of the 1970 Copa Libertadores, the 11th edition of the Copa Libertadores de América, South America's premier international club football tournament organized by CONMEBOL.

The finals were contested in two-legged home-and-away format between Argentine team Estudiantes de La Plata and Uruguayan team Peñarol. The first leg was hosted by Estudiantes in Estudiantes Stadium in La Plata on May 21, 1970, while the second leg was held in Estadio Centenario of Montevideo on May 27, 1970.

Estudiantes won the series 1-0 on aggregate, winning their 3rd title consecutive of Copa Libertadores.

== Qualified teams ==
Team	Previous finals app.
(Argentina) Estudiantes LP	**1968**, **1969**
(Uruguay) Peñarol	**1960**, **1961**, 1962, 1965, **1966**

Bold indicates winning years

== Stadiums ==
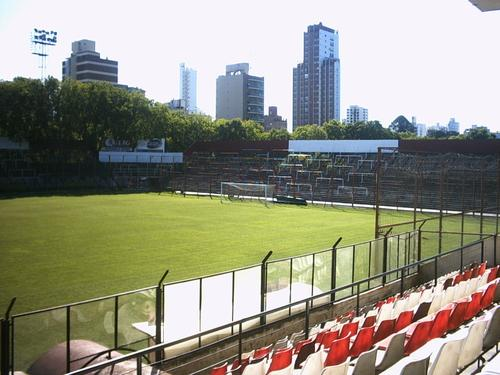
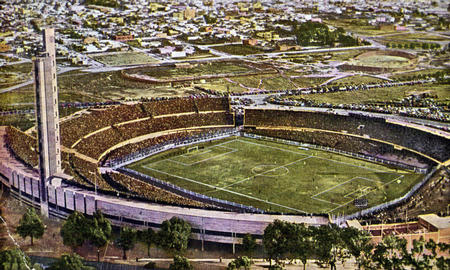
Estudiantes stadium and Estadio Centenario, venues for the finals

== Match details ==
=== First leg ===
1970 Copa Libertadores finals
May 21, 1970
First leg

Estudiantes (LP) (Argentina)	1–0	(Uruguay) Peñarol
Togneri 87'

Estudiantes
Attendance: 40,000
Referee: Carlos Robles (Chile)

**Estudiantes LP**	**Peñarol**

GK	(Argentina) Néstor Errea
DF	(Argentina) Rubén Pagnanini
DF	(Argentina) Hugo Spadaro
DF	(Argentina) Néstor Togneri
MF	(Argentina) Carlos Pachamé
MF	(Argentina) Jorge Solari
MF	(Argentina) Carlos Bilardo
FW	(Argentina) Juan Echecopar
FW	(Argentina) Marcos Conigliaro
FW	(Argentina) Eduardo Flores	Substituted off
FW	(Argentina) Juan Ramón Verón (c)
Substitutes:
MF	(Czechoslovakia) Christian Rudzki	Substituted on
Manager:
(Argentina) Osvaldo Zubeldía

GK	(Uruguay) Ariel Pintos
DF	(Uruguay) Ricardo Soria	(substituted off) a'
DF	(Chile) Elías Figueroa
DF	(Uruguay) Jorge Peralta
DF	(Uruguay) Alberto Martínez
MF	(Uruguay) Néstor Gonçalves
MF	(Uruguay) Milton Viera
MF	(Uruguay) Alfredo Lamas	(substituted off) b'
FW	(Uruguay) Nilo Acuña
FW	(Argentina) Ermindo Onega
FW	(Uruguay) Luis Lamberck
Substitutes:
DF	(Uruguay) Mario González	(substituted on) a'
FW	(Uruguay) Waldemar Cáceres	(substituted on) b'
Manager:
(Brazil) Osvaldo Brandão

=== Second leg ===
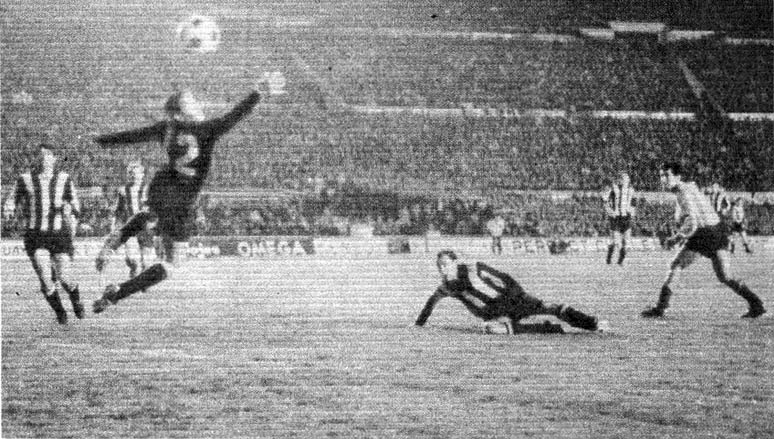
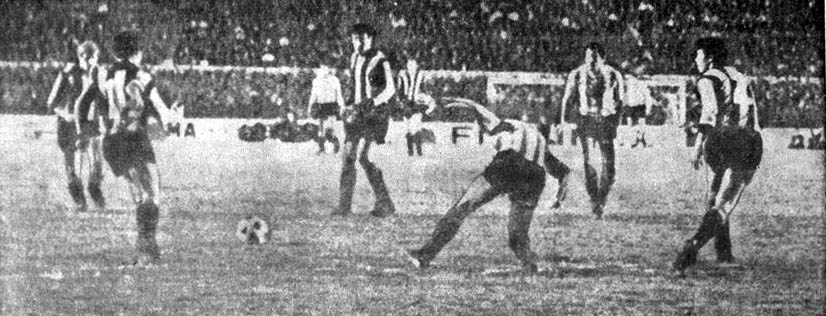
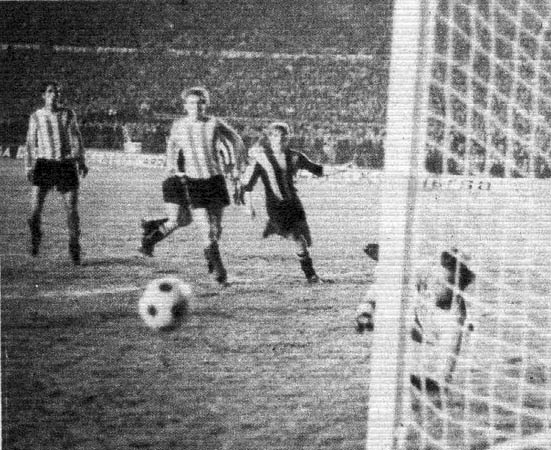
Some moments of the match in Montevideo, fltr: the shot by Verón going near the goal; at right, Errea saving Estudiantes' goal
May 28, 1970
Second leg

Peñarol (Uruguay)	0–0	(Argentina) Estudiantes (LP)

Estadio Centenario
Attendance: 60,000
Referee: Larrosa (Paraguay)

**Peñarol**	**Estudiantes LP**

GK	**12**	(Uruguay) Ariel Pintos
DF		(Uruguay) Ricardo Soria	Substituted off
DF		(Chile) Elías Figueroa
DF		(Uruguay) Jorge Peralta
DF		(Uruguay) Alberto Martínez
MF		(Uruguay) Néstor Gonçalves
MF		(Uruguay) Milton Viera
MF		(Uruguay) Alfredo Lamas
FW		(Uruguay) Nilo Acuña
FW		(Argentina) Ermindo Onega
FW		(Uruguay) Luis Lamberck
Substitutes:
FW		(Uruguay) Luis Speranza	Substituted on
Manager:
(Brazil) Osvaldo Brandão

GK		(Argentina) Néstor Errea
DF		(Argentina) Rubén Pagnanini
DF		(Argentina) Hugo Spadaro
DF		(Argentina) Néstor Togneri
DF		(Argentina) José Hugo Medina
MF		(Argentina) Carlos Pachamé
MF		(Argentina) Jorge Solari
MF		(Argentina) Carlos Bilardo
FW		(Argentina) Juan Echecopar	(substituted off) a'
FW		(Argentina) Marcos Conigliaro	(substituted off) b'
FW	**11**	(Argentina) Juan Ramón Verón (c)
Substitutes:
FW		(Czechoslovakia) Christian Rudzki	(substituted on) a'
FW		(Argentina) Camilo A. Aguilar	(substituted on) b'
Manager:
(Argentina) Osvaldo Zubeldía
