= Tato Medina =

Argentinian footballer (1956–2019)

- Medina in 1974

Personal information
- Full name: José Hugo Medina
- Date of birth: 14 June 1945
- Place of birth: Campo Santo, Salta, Argentina
- Date of death: 14 May 2019 (aged 73)
- Place of death: San Miguel de Tucumán, Tucumán, Argentina
- Position: Defender

Senior career*
Years	Team	Apps	(Gls)
1968–1974	Estudiantes de La Plata		
1975	Gimnasia y Esgrima de Jujuy		
1976–1979	Quilmes		
- * Club domestic league appearances and goals

José Hugo "Tato" Medina (14 June 1945 – 14 May 2019) was an Argentine former footballer. He played as a defender for Estudiantes de La Plata and Quilmes throughout the late 1960s and the 1970s, winning many titles for Estudiantes across his career.

== Club career ==
Born on 14 June 1945 in Campo Santo, Salta, Medina was the son of railroad employees who worked on barriers. Due to his parent's work, he moved to Tucumán Province, first playing for Club Atlético Tucumán Central due to their home stadium being near his house. When Medina was 9 years old, his father died as around that time, his circumstances forced him to play for Atlético Tucumán instead. However, by the time it came to his senior debut, he instead opted with Estudiantes de La Plata for the 1964 Argentine Primera División that would end in a terrible 14th place position. Despite the club's overall placement, Medina would enjoy a consistent win rate alongside other youth footballers that were promoted to the season, winning 24 of 34 appearances alone. This initial mediocrity would quickly be addressed however as he was later part of the winning team for the 1967 Campeonato Metropolitano. This success would continue into the following season as Estudiantes would win the 1968 Copa Libertadores with Medina playing in the play-off match that saw his club win in a 0–2 victory against Brazilian side Palmeiras.

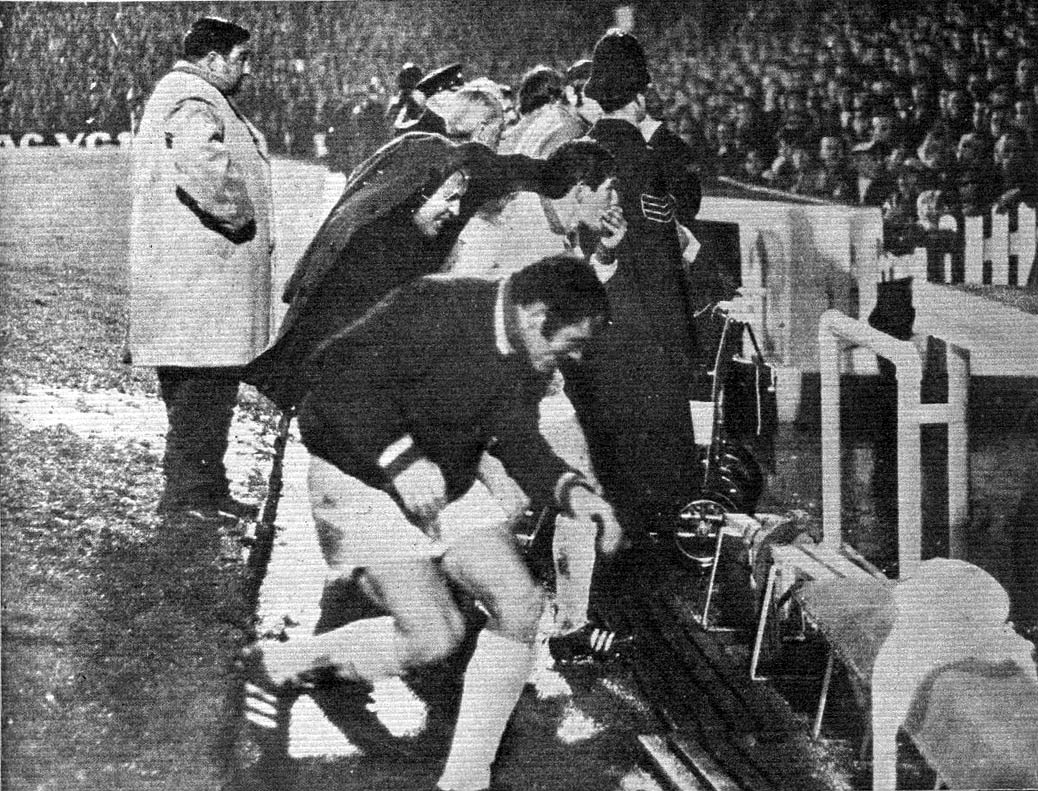
Medina retires from the field while the crowd throw objects at the team during the 1968 Intercontinental Cup

This, in turn, saw Estudiantes qualify for the 1968 Intercontinental Cup against English side Manchester United as the second legged match being scheduled to be played at Old Trafford. Around this time, the team had already gained a 1–0 lead following the first matchday through a goal by Marcos Conigliaro. Despite an initial lead by Juan Ramón Verón at the 8th minute, Willie Morgan later scored an equalizer in the 90th minute resulting in a tense overtime. Throughout the match, Medina chose to man-mark Manchester United forward George Best, preventing him from scoring any goals. Despite being sent off in the 89th minute, his role had been accomplished as even with the equalizer by Morgan, The Red Devils lost on aggregate as Estudiantes won their first title in the tournament. Following the match, Medina was reported saying the following during an interview:

Dreams often come true. You have to be prepared for everything. Estudiantes is a school. It was a perfect night, where we showed that we were the best in the world, in a simply spectacular definition. I beat Manchester in the Devil's Cauldron.

Throughout Medina's career with Estudiantes, he would experience great success with the club as he was part of the winning squads for the 1967 Trofeo Triangular de Palma, the 1969 and 1970 Copa Libertadores, the 1968 Festa d'Elx Trophy. He primarily served as a substitute player for Eduardo Manera whenever he was unavailable with Medina notably taking his place during the second legged match of the 1970 Copa Libertadores finals that saw Estudiantes win their third consecutive title. Following a brief stint with Gimnasia y Esgrima de Jujuy in 1975, he spent the remainder of his career Quilmes as he was also part of the winning squad for the 1978 Campeonato Metripolitano, overthrowing Juan Carlos Lorenzo's Boca Juniors side before retiring in the following season.

== Managerial career and later life ==
In 1985, Medina first arrived at Club Comercio Central Unidos of Santiago del Estero to lead the board of directors before managing the club from 1991 to 1993. He also managed Central Córdoba throughout the 1990s. His biggest role came during managing the youth sector of Estudiantes during the 2004 Manchester United Premier Cup, winning the Argentine sector of the tournament. Since then, he has remained active as a supporter of his former club.

Medina died on 14 May 2019.
