= 1967 Campeonato Metropolitano final =

- Team of Estudiantes LP, winners
- Event: 1967 Campeonato Metropolitano
Estudiantes (LP)	Racing
3	0
- Date: 6 August 1967
- Venue: Estadio Gasómetro, Buenos Aires
- Referee: Guillermo Nimo
- Attendance: 59,453

The 1967 Campeonato Metropolitano final were the final match of the 1967 Campeonato Metropolitano , the first league championship held during the 76th. season of the Argentine Primera División. The final was contested by Estudiantes de La Plata (it was their first Primera División final) and Racing Club de Avellaneda (contesting their 4th final).

The final was held in a neutral venue, in this case the Estadio Gasómetro, home of club San Lorenzo de Almagro. Estudiantes LP defeated Racing 3–0 to win their 2nd. Primera División title. It was the first championship won by Osvaldo Zubeldía during his tenure as manager of Estudiantes.

== Background ==
After a restructuring of championship systems led by president of the Argentine Football Association (AFA) Valentín Suárez, the Argentine Primera División had two different championships within a season. 1967 saw the debut of Metropolitano and Nacional tournaments. The Metropolitano had a similar format to previous championships while the Nacional added clubs from regional leagues.

Racing Club, managed by Juan José Pizutti, was the Intercontinental reigning champion after defeating Scottish side Celtic that same year. The victory had been widely acclaimed throughout Argentina (where they were named "world champions"), even by supporters of rival clubs.

On the other hand, Estudiantes was managed by Osvaldo Zubeldía, who had taken over the team in 1965. The good work in the youth divisions of the club had allowed the emergence of raising talents such as Juan Ramón Verón, Carlos Pachamé, Eduardo Flores, Oscar Malbernat. Those young players along with Carlos Bilardo, Raúl Madero, Juan Echecopar, Ramón Aguirre Suárez, and Alberto Poletti, would form the team that wrote the most glorious pages for the club.

== Qualified teams ==
Team	Previous app.
Estudiantes (LP)	(none)
Racing	**1913**, **1915**, **1951**

- Bold: indicates winning years
- Met: Campeonato Metropolitano
- Nac: Campeonato Nacional

== Venue ==
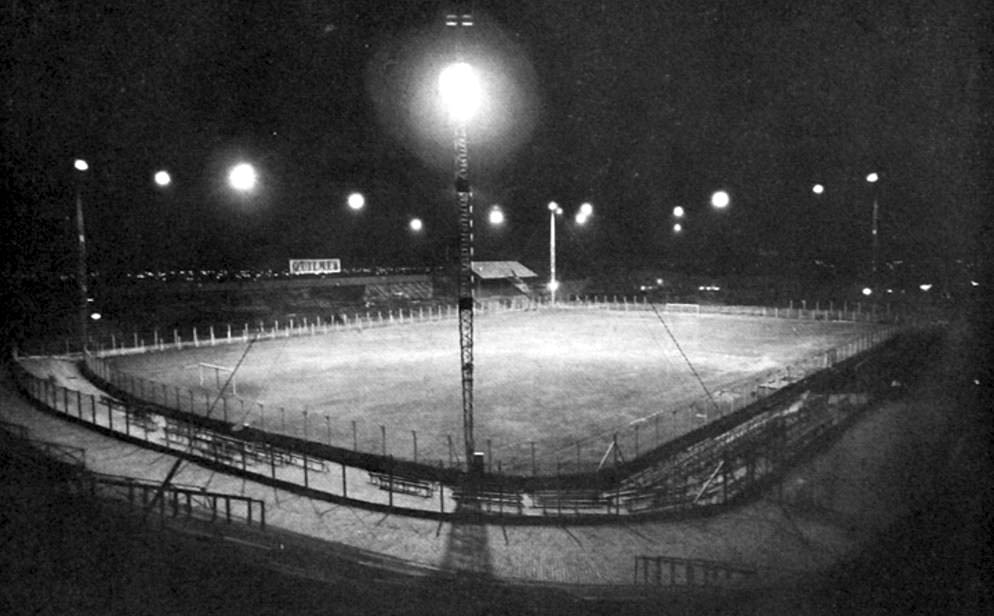
Estadio Gasómetro, venue of the match

The final was held in Estadio Gasómetro, located in the neighborhood of Boedo in Buenos Aires. Inaugurated in 1916, the stadium was the home ground of club San Lorenzo de Almagro before they moved to their new venue, Estadio Pedro Bidegain, which is sometimes referred to as Nuevo Gasómetro ("New Gasometer"), in 1993. The stadium had a capacity of 75,000 people.

The stadium was nicknamed Gasómetro due to its exterior facade that reminded of a gas holder, very common at the time. It has a capacity of 75,000 spectators, being the largest stadium of Argentina until the construction of El Cilindro, home venue of Racing Club de Avellaneda, inaugurated in 1950. Racing's stadium had a capacity of 100,000 spectators, then reduced to 66,000 in the 1990s. The stadium was one of the venues for the 1929 South American Championship.

== Road to the final ==
Participant teams were divided into two groups (A and B) of eleven teams each, playing in a double round-robin tournament. The two best placed team of each zone qualified for the semifinals, played in a single match. Group stage included inter-zonal matches (also played on home and away games), where Estudiantes and Racing played against their arch-rivals Gimnasia y Esgrima LP and Independiente respectively.

Estudiantes (LP)			Round	Racing		
Opponent	Result (home / away)		Group stage	Opponent	Result (home / away)	
Huracán	2–1 (A)	1–1 (H)	Matchday 1	Newell's Old Boys	0–0 (H)	0–0 (A)
Lanús	2–0 (H)	2–4 (A)	Matchday 2	Quilmes	3–2 (A)	1–1 (H)
Atlanta	0–0 (A)	1–0 (H)	Matchday 3	Argentinos Juniors	3–0 (H)	2–0 (A)
Boca Juniors	1–0 (H)	0–1 (A)	Matchday 4	Colón	1–1 (A)	2–1 (H)
Racing	2–1 (A)	1–0 (H)	Matchday 5	Estudiantes LP	1–2 (H)	0–1 (A)
Vélez Sarsfield	1–0 (H)	0–2 (A)	Matchday 6	Huracán	4–1 (A)	0–0 (H)
Newell's Old Boys	0–2 (A)	2–2 (H)	Matchday 7	Lanús	2–1 (H)	2–1 (A)
Quilmes	2–0 (H)	0–0 (A)	Matchday 8	Atlanta	1–0 (A)	2–2 (H)
Argentinos Juniors	1–0 (A)	1–1 (H)	Matchday 9	Boca Juniors	2–1 (H)	0–0 (A)
Colón	2–0 (H)	0–0 (A)	Matchday 10	Independiente (Note: Inter-zonal match.)	0–1 (H)	0–3 (A)
Gimnasia y Esgrima LP	0–0 (A)	3–0 (H)	Matchday 11	Vélez Sarsfield	0–0 (A)	1–1 (H)
**Group A winners**: Pos. / Team / Pts / W / T / L / Pl / Qualification; 1 / Racing / 29 / 10 / 9 / 3 / 22 / Semifinals; 2 / Estudiantes LP / 29 / 11 / 7 / 4 / 22 / Semifinals; 3 / Vélez Sarsfield / 27 / 10 / 7 / 5 / 22; 4 / Boca Juniors / 26 / 8 / 10 / 4 / 22
Opponent	Result		Knockout stage	Opponent	Result	
Platense	4–3 (N)		Semifinals	Independiente	2–0 (N)	

== Match ==
=== Summary ===
Raúl Madero about to take the free kick that opened the score (above), and the unsuccessful effort by goalkeeper Antonino Spilinga to avoid the ball crosses the goal (below)

In the final, motivated by the historic 4–3 victory against Platense in semifinals, Estudiantes crushed Racing from start to finish, although that supremacy would be reflected in the result only in the second half.

At 7 minutes, defender Raúl Madero scored the first goal with a free kick, placing the ball in the upper right corner of Racing goalkeeper Antonino Spilinga. At about 24 minutes, Carlos Bilardo played for winger Juan Ramón Verón, who opened on the left for Felipe Ribaudo, who gave a pass to Verón to take a strong shot and increase the score to 2–0. At 27 minutes Verón escaped again and, when he reached the bottom, he sent a cross to Ribaudo, who after eluding Oscar Gómez gave the ball to Marcos Conigliaro. The forward, with the mark on him, returned it first to Ribaudo, who stopped the ball and kicked the goal, leaving the score at a defining 3–0..

Once the referee of the match, Guillermo Nimo, marked the end of the match, Estudiantes de La Plata became champions and delirium broke out, both in Boedo and in the city of La Plata.

Estudiantes LP won their second league title and the first under the management of Osvaldo Zubeldía. This achievement would be followed by other great milestones such as the 1967 Copa Libertadores and the 1968 Intercontinental Cup –among other honours– that consolidated Estudiantes LP as one of the most successful teams of their era and the legacy of Zubeldía as a revolutionary coach, not only in Estudiantes but in the history of football in Argentina.

=== Details ===
1967 Campeonato Metropolitano Final
August 6

Estudiantes (LP)	3–0	Racing
Madero 52'; Verón 69'; Ribaudo 72'	Report

Estadio Gasómetro, Buenos Aires
Attendance: 59,453
Referee: Guillermo Nimo

**Estudiantes (LP)**	**Racing**

GK	1	(Argentina) Alberto Poletti
LB	2	(Argentina) Ramón Aguirre Suárez
RB	3	(Argentina) Hugo Spadaro
RH	4	(Argentina) Oscar Malbernat
CH	5	(Argentina) Raúl Madero
LH	6	(Argentina) Carlos Pachamé
RW	7	(Argentina) Felipe Ribaudo
IF	8	(Argentina) Carlos Bilardo
CF	9	(Argentina) Marcos Conigliaro
IF	10	(Argentina) Juan Echecopar
LW	11	(Argentina) Juan Ramón Verón
Manager:
(Argentina) Osvaldo Zubeldía

GK	1	(Argentina) Antonino Spilinga
RB	2	(Argentina) Oscar P. Gómez
LB	3	(Argentina) Nelson Chabay
RH	4	(Argentina) Oscar Martín (c)
MF	5	(Argentina) Miguel Mori
CB	6	(Argentina) Alfio Basile
RW	7	(Brazil) Joao C. Esteves
IF	8	(Argentina) Fernando Parenti
CF	9	(Argentina) Norberto Raffo
IF	10	(Argentina) Juan J. Rodríguez
LW	11	(Argentina) Humberto Maschio
Manager:
(Argentina) Juan José Pizzuti

== Aftermath ==
Raúl Madero, Enry Barale, and Marcos Conigliaro celebrating the title

El Gráfico's journalist Osvaldo Ardizzone wrote about the match "This Racing had never been beaten like this before", stating that the poor physical condition of Racing players influenced the result. Ardizzone also praised the speed of playmaker Juan Echecopar, taking advantage of the Racing players' fatigue, with the exception of Alfio Basile, who fixed the mistakes of his teammates and even went on the attack. Other players whose performances were praised by the critic include Carlos Pachamé, Oscar Malbernat, Carlos Bilardo, Madero, and Juan Ramón Verón. According to his words, at the moment of the opening goal by Madero, "there was only one team on the field".

Another journalist of El Gráfico, Julio C. Pasquatto (aka) "Juvenal", described Estudiantes LP's victory as "a triumph of the new mentality"; in the article, he explained his concept stating that the team had "a mindset served by young, strong, disciplined, dynamic, vigorous people, whole both spiritually and physically. People willing to work towards a common goal, to fight, to sacrifice in favor of the team". The journalist also emphasized the change of tactics of the team from a deffensive team to an extremely offensive side that went out to win all their matches.

Pasquatto based his analysis on the tactical concepts by Zubeldía that imposed his ideas that all the players must be ready to both, attack and defend when necessary.

We feel happy because we won the final to the best team in Argentina.

— Estudiantes LP players
