= Ocho de Bastos =

Latin pop rock band

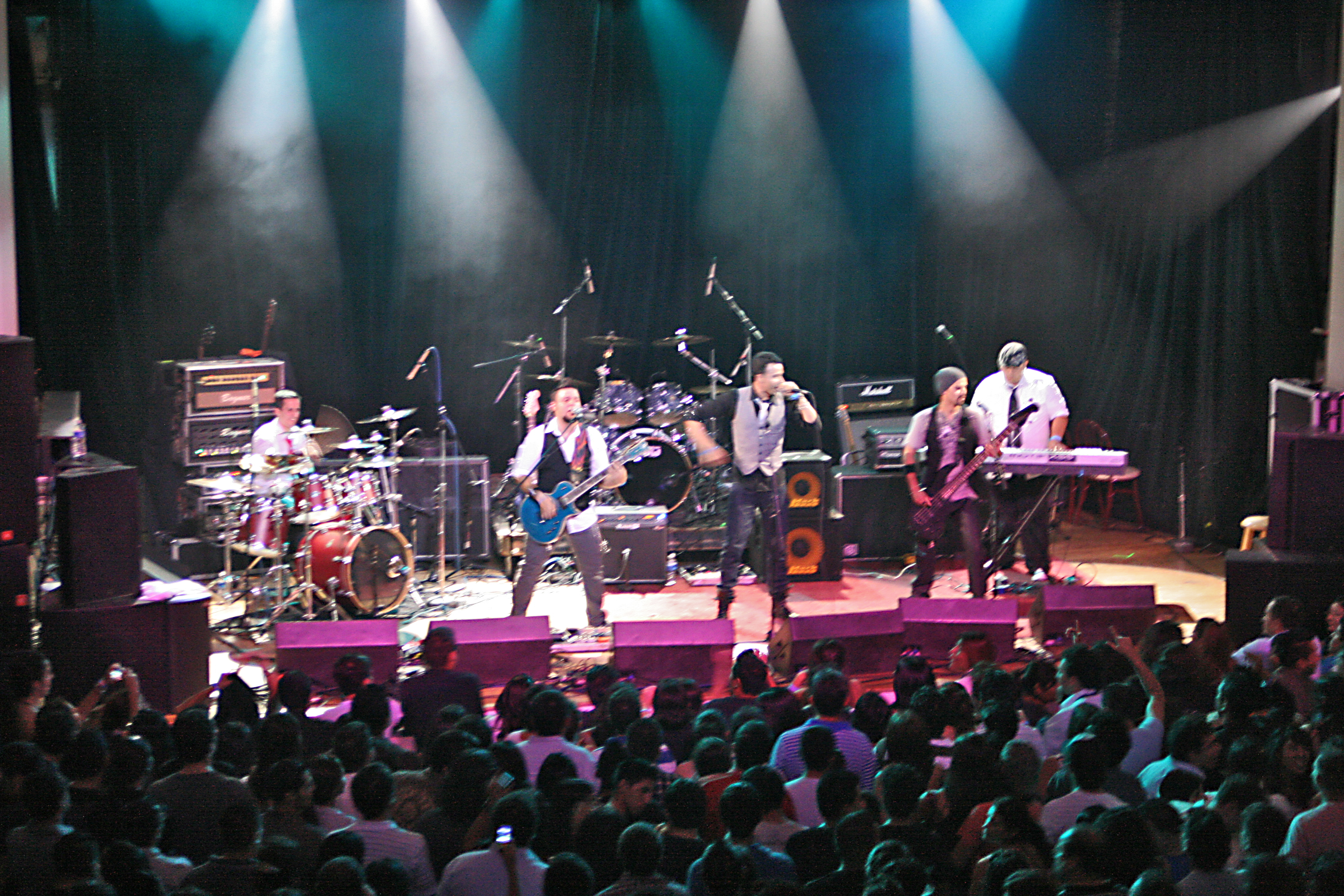
- Ocho de Bastos performing at The State Theatre, Washington DC Metro area.

Background information
- Origin: Washington, D.C., United States
- Genres: Latin pop rock
- Label: unsigned
- Members: Raúl Quiroz - Drums; Hipólito González - Bass Guitar; David Huertas - Guitars; Milton Valentín - Lead Vocals
- Website: Ocho de Bastos

Ocho de Bastos is a Washington, D.C. Metro area Latin pop rock band. A unique guitar sound, blended with powerful drums, Latin percussion, and catchy brass riffs complement Ocho de Bastos’ unique style. The band is considered one of the most prominent representatives of Latin pop rock in the local scene, as evidenced by their recognition from the major Latino media outlets in the Washington DC Metro area and also by the major media outlets in Puerto Rico. Ocho de Bastos has served as opening talent for several well renowned artists in the genre as part of their US tours. Most notably, Los Enanitos Verdes, Cafe Tacuba, Jencarlos Canela, Jarabe de Palo, Los Amigos Invisibles, Los Auténticos Decadentes, and Zoé, among others. The band has participated in multiple large festivals and charitable events where they worked with numerous professional artists and members of the entertainment media.

== Band members ==
The band's lineup consists of Milton Valentín from Puerto Rico as lead vocalist, David Huertas from Ecuador on lead guitar, Hipólito González from the Dominican Republic on bass guitar, and Raúl Quiroz from Venezuela on drums.

Video and pictures of performances by Ocho de Bastos

== Name origin ==
The name Ocho de Bastos ("Eight of Clubs") comes from a Spanish set of playing cards (the Barajas). The name of the band "Ocho de Bastos" was an adaptation to account for band member's Spanish heritage. Ocho de Bastos is also a card from the Spanish Tarot. It is a Minor Arcana that announces change, movement, and new beginnings. But among all mystical meanings, the name “Ocho de Bastos” relates to a popular phrase in Puerto Rico, which locals use when they are completely involved with something: “hasta el Ocho de Bastos”. The band members have expressed they feel the same way about music.

== Discography ==
"Volver con Vos"
"Volver con Vos" is a Latin Rock song written and composed by Ocho de Bastos

"Pedirte Mas"
"Pedirte Mas" is a Latin Rock song written and composed by Ocho de Bastos

- Ocho de Bastos is the self-titled debut album. It is an energetic fusion of Tropical rhythms with Pop rock. A Carlos Santana style guitar sound blended with powerful drums, Latin percussion, and catchy brass riffs complement Ocho de Bastos relentless collaboration style.
- Contigo Quiero is their second album
- Recently, they have released 4 new singles (Bien Pegaito, Fiesta, Live Forever, and Esa Nena)

== Media articles associated with Ocho de Bastos ==
The band has been featured in:

1. Élan Magazine article - "Fusion"
2. Univision - Ocho de Bastos interview
3. La Nueva 87.7FM, "Alejandro Negron y Los Vecinos" show interview
4. La Mega 106.9 FM, "El Circo de La Mega" show interview
5. Eventos Vip Pass Magazine - Events magazine
6. Kesta Happening Magazine - Latin Music and Events magazine in the Washington DC Metro area
7. Romantica 900- Programa "Una Buena Mañana"
8. El Nuevo Día - Rock Latino por el 911
9. Ocho de Bastos first album release - The Masterdisk Record article

== See also ==
- Rock en Español
- Puerto Rican Rock
- Puerto Rico
