= Liga Deportiva Universitaria de Quito in South American football =

Professional football club in Ecuador

Liga Deportiva Universitaria de Quito —often referred to as LDU Quito, Liga de Quito, or simply la Liga— is a professional football club based in Quito, Ecuador. The first international cup they took part in was the Copa Libertadores in 1970 as the champion of Ecuador. Since then, they have taken part in the Copa CONMEBOL, Copa Sudamericana, Recopa Sudamericana, Suruga Bank Championship, and the FIFA Club World Cup.

LDU Quito had the most success in the Recopa Sudamericana, winning back-to-back titles in 2009 and 2010. Their participation in the Recopa was achieved by winning the 2008 Copa Libertadores and the 2009 Copa Sudamericana. LDU Quito is the first, and to date, the only Ecuadorian club to win any of the aforementioned tournaments.

In the tables, (H) denotes home ground, (A) denotes away ground, and (N) symbolizes neutral ground. The first score is always LDU Quito's.

== Copa Libertadores ==
The Copa Libertadores was inaugurated in 1960, and LDU Quito first participated in 1970. They reached the semifinals in consecutive seasons in 1975 and 1976. After sporadic participation in the 1980s and 1990s, Liga became a regular participant in the 2000s. They won the competition in 2008, becoming the first Ecuadorian club to win the competition or any international title.

Season	Stage	Opposition	Score
1970	First Stage (Group 4)	(Peru) Universitario	2–0 (H); 0–2 (A)
1970	First Stage (Group 4)	(Peru) Defensor Arica	1–2 (H); 0–0 (A)
1970	First Stage (Group 4)	(Ecuador) América de Quito	4–1 (H); 3–1 (A)
1970	Second stage (Group 2)	(Uruguay) Peñarol	1–3 (H); 1–2 (A)
1970	Second stage (Group 2)	(Paraguay) Guaraní	1–0 (H); 1–1 (A)
1975	First Stage (Group 4)	(Ecuador) El Nacional	3–1 (H); 2–2 (A)
1975	First Stage (Group 4)	(Venezuela) Deportivo Galicia	4–2 (H); 1–0 (A)
1975	First Stage (Group 4)	(Venezuela) Portuguesa	1–1 (H); 1–1 (A)
1975	Semifinals (Group 1)	(Peru) Universitario	0–0 (H); 1–2 (A)
1975	Semifinals (Group 1)	(Chile) Unión Española	4–2 (H); 0–2 (A)
1976	First Stage (Group 2)	(Ecuador) Deportivo Cuenca	1–1 (H); 0–0 (A); 2–1 (N)
1976	First Stage (Group 2)	(Bolivia) Guabirá	4–1 (H); 1–0 (A)
1976	First Stage (Group 2)	(Bolivia) Bolívar	2–1 (H); 2–3 (A)
1976	Semifinals (Group 1)	(Peru) Alianza Lima	2–1 (H); 0–2 (A)
1976	Semifinals (Group 1)	(Brazil) Cruzeiro	1–3 (H); 1–4 (A)
1978	First Stage (Group 1)	(Argentina) Independiente	1–0 (H); 0–2 (A)
1978	First Stage (Group 1)	(Argentina) River Plate	0–0 (H); 0–4 (A)
1978	First Stage (Group 1)	(Ecuador) El Nacional	0–2 (A); 3–2 (H)
1982	First Stage (Group 4)	(Ecuador) Barcelona	1–4 (A); 4–2 (H)
1982	First Stage (Group 4)	(Chile) Colo-Colo	2–2 (H); 0–1 (A)
1982	First Stage (Group 4)	(Chile) Cobreloa	0–0 (H); 1–3 (A)
1991	First Stage (Group 2)	(Ecuador) Barcelona	1–0 (A); 0–0 (H)
1991	First Stage (Group 2)	(Chile) Deportes Concepción	4–0 (H); 0–3 (A)
1991	First Stage (Group 2)	(Chile) Colo-Colo	0–3 (A); 0–0 (H)
1991	Round of 16	(Colombia) Atlético Nacional	2–2 (H); 0–2 (A)
1999	First Stage (Group 5)	(Ecuador) Emelec	4–1 (H); 0–2 (A)
1999	First Stage (Group 5)	(Bolivia) Jorge Wilstermann	3–1 (H); 1–1 (A)
1999	First Stage (Group 5)	(Bolivia) Blooming	1–0 (H); 1–3 (A)
1999	Round of 16	(Argentina) River Plate	0–1 (A); 1–0 (H) (4–5 p)
2000	First Stage (Group 3)	(Paraguay) Olimpia	0–1 (H); 1–1 (A)
2000	First Stage (Group 3)	(Brazil) Corinthians	0–6 (A); 0–2 (H)
2000	First Stage (Group 3)	(Mexico) América	0–1 (A); 2–2 (H)
2004	First Stage (Group 4)	(Chile) Cobreloa	2–0 (A); 5–1 (H)
2004	First Stage (Group 4)	(Peru) Alianza Lima	3–0 (H); 0–1 (A)
2004	First Stage (Group 4)	(Brazil) São Paulo	3–0 (H); 0–1 (A)
2004	Round of 16	(Brazil) Santos	4–2 (H); 0–2 (A) (3–5 p)
2005	First Stage	(Uruguay) Peñarol	3–0 (H); 1–4 (A)
2005	Second stage (Group 2)	(Uruguay) Danubio	0–3 (A); 1–1 (H)
2005	Second stage (Group 2)	(Bolivia) Bolívar	1–0 (H); 2–2 (A)
2005	Second stage (Group 2)	(Brazil) Santos	2–1 (H); 1–3 (A)
2005	Round of 16	(Argentina) River Plate	2–1 (H); 2–4 (A)
2006	Second stage (Group 5)	(Argentina) Vélez Sársfield	1–3 (H); 2–2 (A)
2006	Second stage (Group 5)	(Peru) Universitario	2–1 (A); 4–0 (H)
2006	Second stage (Group 5)	(Uruguay) Rocha	2–3 (A); 5–0 (H)
2006	Round of 16	(Colombia) Atlético Nacional	4–0 (H); 1–0 (A)
2006	Quarterfinals	(Brazil) Internacional	2–1 (H); 0–2 (A)
2007	First Stage	(Paraguay) Tacuary	1–1 (A); 3–0 (H)
2007	Second stage (Group 6)	(Venezuela) Caracas	0–1 (A); 3–1 (H)
2007	Second stage (Group 6)	(Chile) Colo-Colo	3–1 (H); 0–4 (A)
2007	Second stage (Group 6)	(Argentina) River Plate	1–1 (H); 0–0 (A)
2008	Second stage (Group 8)	(Brazil) Fluminense	0–0 (H); 0–1 (A)
2008	Second stage (Group 8)	(Paraguay) Libertad	2–0 (H); 1–3 (A)
2008	Second stage (Group 8)	(Argentina) Arsenal	1–0 (A); 6–1 (H)
2008	Round of 16	(Argentina) Estudiantes	2–0 (H); 1–2 (A)
2008	Quarterfinals	(Argentina) San Lorenzo	1–1 (A); 1–1 (H) (5–3 p)
2008	Semifinals	(Mexico) América	1–1 (A); 0–0 (H)
2008	Finals	(Brazil) Fluminense	4–2 (H); 1–3 (A) (3–1 p)
2009	Second stage (Group 1)	(Brazil) Palmeiras	3–2 (H); 0–2 (A)
2009	Second stage (Group 1)	(Brazil) Sport Recife	0–2 (A); 2–3 (H)
2009	Second stage (Group 1)	(Chile) Colo-Colo	0–3 (A); 1–1 (H)
2011	Second stage (Group 8)	(Argentina) Godoy Cruz	1–2 (A); 2–0 (H)
2011	Second stage (Group 8)	(Argentina) Independiente	3–0 (H); 1–1 (A)
2011	Second stage (Group 8)	(Uruguay) Peñarol	0–1 (A); 5–0 (H)
2011	Round of 16	(Argentina) Vélez Sársfield	0–3 (A); 0–2 (H)
2013	First Stage	(Brazil) Grêmio	1–0 (H); 0–1 (A) (4–5 p)
2016	Second stage (Group 6)	(Brazil) Grêmio	0–4 (A); 2–3 (H)
2016	Second stage (Group 6)	(Argentina) San Lorenzo	2–0 (H); 1–1 (A)
2016	Second stage (Group 6)	(Mexico) Toluca	1–2 (H); 1–2 (A)
2019	Second stage (Group D)	(Uruguay) Peñarol	2–0 (H); 0–1 (A)
2019	Second stage (Group D)	(Brazil) Flamengo	1–3 (A); 2–1 (H)
2019	Second stage (Group D)	(Bolivia) San José	3–3 (A); 4–0 (H)
2019	Round of 16	(Paraguay) Olimpia	3–1 (H); 1–1 (A)
2019	Quarterfinals	(Argentina) Boca Juniors	0–3 (H); 0–0 (A)
2020	Second stage (Group D)	(Argentina) River Plate	3–0 (H); 0–3 (A)
2020	Second stage (Group D)	(Brazil) São Paulo	0–3 (A); 4–2 (H)
2020	Second stage (Group D)	(Peru) Binacional	1–0 (A); 4–0 (H)
2020	Round of 16	(Brazil) Santos	1–2 (H); 1–0 (A)
2021	Second stage (Group G)	(Chile) Unión La Calera	2–2 (A); 5–2 (H)
2021	Second stage (Group G)	(Argentina) Vélez Sarsfield	3–1 (H); 1–3 (A)
2021	Second stage (Group G)	(Brazil) Flamengo	2–3 (H); 2–2 (A)

== Copa Sudamericana ==
The Copa Sudamericana was inaugurated in 2002 and Liga first participated in 2003. They have been regular participants since then. They hold the record with most semifinal appearances totaling four times (2004, 2009, 2010, 2011). Liga won the competition in 2009 for their third international title.

Season	Stage	Opposition	Score
2003	First round	(Ecuador) Barcelona	2–0 (H); 1–1 (A)
2003	Second round	(Colombia) Atlético Nacional	1–1 (H); 0–1 (A)
2004	First round	(Ecuador) Aucas	1–0 (H); 1–1 (A)
2004	Second round	(Peru) Cienciano	4–0 (H); 2–2 (A)
2004	Quarterfinals	(Brazil) Santos	3–2 (H); 2–1 (A)
2004	Semifinals	(Bolivia) Bolívar	1–1 (H); 1–2 (A)
2005	First round	(Ecuador) El Nacional	4–3 (A); 1–2 (H)
2005	Second round	(Bolivia) The Strongest	2–1 (H); 0–3 (A)
2006	First round	(Ecuador) El Nacional	2–3 (A); 1–1 (H)
2008	First round	(Bolivia) Bolívar	4–2 (H); 1–2 (A)
2008	Round of 16	(Argentina) Boca Juniors	0–4 (A); 1–1 (H)
2009	First round	(Paraguay) Libertad	1–0 (H); 1–1 (A)
2009	Round of 16	(Argentina) Lanús	4–0 (H); 1–1 (A)
2009	Quarterfinals	(Argentina) Vélez Sársfield	1–1 (A); 2–1 (H)
2009	Semifinals	(Uruguay) River Plate	1–2 (A); 7–0 (H)
2009	Finals	(Brazil) Fluminense	5–1 (H); 0–3 (A)
2010	Round of 16	(Chile) Unión San Felipe	2–4 (A); 6–1 (H)
2010	Quarterfinals	(Argentina) Newell's Old Boys	0–0 (A); 1–0 (H)
2010	Semifinals	(Argentina) Independiente	3–2 (H); 1–2 (A)
2011	First round	(Venezuela) Yaracuyanos	1–1 (A); 1–0 (H)
2011	Second round	(Venezuela) Trujillanos	4–1 (H); 1–0 (A)
2011	Round of 16	(Argentina) Independiente	2–0 (H); 0–1 (A)
2011	Quarterfinals	(Paraguay) Libertad	1–0 (H); 0–1 (A) (5–4 p)
2011	Semifinals	(Argentina) Vélez Sarsfield	2–0 (H); 1–0 (A)
2011	Finals	Universidad de Chile	0–1 (H); 0–3 (A)
2015	First round	(Venezuela) Zamora	1–1 (A); 2–0 (H)
2015	Second round	(Paraguay) Nacional	1–0 (H); 1–0 (A)
2015	Round of 16	(Argentina) River Plate	0–2 (A); 1–0 (H)
2017	First round	(Uruguay) Defensor Sporting	2–2 (H); 2–1 (A)
2017	Second round	(Bolivia) Bolívar	0–1 (A); 1–0 (H) (6–5 p)
2017	Round of 16	(Brazil) Fluminense	0–1 (A); 2–1 (H)
2018	First round	(Bolivia) Guabirá	2–1 (H); 2–3 (A)
2018	Second round	(Brazil) Vasco da Gama	3–1 (H); 0–1 (A)
2018	Round of 16	(Colombia) Deportivo Cali	1–0 (H); 0–1 (A) (1–3 p)
2021	Round of 16	(Brazil) Grêmio	0–1 (H); 2–1 (A)
2021	Quarterfinals	(Brazil) Athletico Paranaense	1–0 (H); 2–4 (A)
2022	First Stage	(Ecuador) Mushuc Runa	2–0 (A); 1–1 (H)
2022	Group stage (Group F)	(Brazil) Atlético Goianiense	0–4 (A); 1–1 (H)
2022	Group stage (Group F)	(Chile) Deportes Antofagasta	4–0 (H); 2–1 (A)
2022	Group stage (Group F)	(Argentina) Defensa y Justicia	2–1 (A); 2–2 (H)
2023	First Stage	(Ecuador) Delfín	4–0 (H)

== Copa CONMEBOL ==
The Copa CONMEBOL was inaugurated in 1992 and lasted until 1999. Liga only participated in one edition (1998). They were eliminated in the second round by eventual champion Santos.

Season	Stage	Opposition	Score
1998	First round	(Peru) Melgar	3–1 (A); 3–1 (H)
1998	Second round	(Brazil) Santos	2–2 (H); 0–3 (A)

== Recopa Sudamericana ==
The Recopa Sudamericana was inaugurated in 1989 and again in 2003. It is contested between the winners of the Copa Libertadores and Copa Sudamericana. Liga participated in consecutive seasons in 2009 and 2010 as the 2008 Copa Libertadores and 2009 Copa Sudamericana champions, respectively. Liga won both editions and are currently the second most successful club in the competition. They are also one of three clubs to win back-to-back titles.

Season	Stage	Opposition	Score
2009	Final	(Brazil) Internacional	1–0 (A); 3–0 (H)
2010	Final	(Argentina) Estudiantes	2–1 (H); 0–0 (A)

== Copa Suruga Bank ==
The Copa Suruga Bank was inaugurated in 2008 and is contested between the winners of the Copa Sudamericana and the J.League Cup. Liga's only participation came in 2010 as the 2009 Copa Sudamericana champion. Lost their only match in a penalty shoot-out.

Season	Stage	Opposition	Score
2010	N/A	(Japan) FC Tokyo	2–2 (3–4 p) (A)

== FIFA Club World Cup ==
The FIFA Club World Cup is an international club competition between the seasons' winner of each continental club championship, inaugurated in 2000. Liga's only participation came in 2008 as that year's Copa Libertadores champion. They finished as the runner-up to the European champions, Manchester United.

Season	Stage	Opposition	Score
2008	Semifinals	(Mexico) Pachuca	2–0 (N)
2008	Final	(England) Manchester United	0–1 (N)

== Overall record ==
Competition	Part	Pld	W	D	L	GF	GA	GD	Pts	Eff	Champion	Runner-up
Copa Libertadores	20	161	62	36	63	238	228	+10	222	45.96%	1	0
Copa Sudamericana	13	80	38	16	26	123	95	+28	130	54.17%	1	1
Copa CONMEBOL	1	4	2	1	1	8	7	+1	7	58.33%	0	0
Recopa Sudamericana	2	4	3	1	0	6	1	+5	10	83.33%	2	0
FIFA Club World Cup	1	2	1	0	1	2	1	+1	3	50.00%	0	1
Copa Suruga Bank	1	1	0	1	0	2	2	0	1	33.33%	0	1
Total	38	252	106	55	91	379	334	+45	373	49.14%	4	3

Updated as of the end of 2022.
