= Osvaldo Brandão =

Brazilian footballer and manager

Personal information
- Date of birth: 18 September 1916
- Place of birth: Taquara, Brazil
- Date of death: 29 August 1989 (aged 72)
- Place of death: São Paulo, Brazil
- Position: Midfielder

Senior career*
Years	Team	Apps	(Gls)
1937–1942	Internacional		
1942–1945	Palmeiras		

Managerial career
- 1945: Palmeiras
- 1947–1948: Palmeiras
- 1948–1950: Santos
- 1951–1953: Portuguesa
- 1954–1957: Corinthians
- 1955–1956: Brazil
- 1958–1960: Palmeiras
- 1961–1963: Independiente
- 1963: São Paulo
- 1964–1966: Corinthians
- 1967: Independiente
- 1968: Corinthians
- 1969–1970: Peñarol
- 1971: São Paulo
- 1971–1975: Palmeiras
- 1975–1977: Brazil
- 1977–1978: Corinthians
- 1980: Palmeiras
- 1980–1981: Corinthians
- 1984: Cruzeiro
- 1986: Vila Nova
- * Club domestic league appearances and goals

Osvaldo Augusto Brandão (18 September 1916 – 29 July 1989) was a Brazilian football player and coach who managed Brazil in 1955, 1956, and 1957, and from 1975 to 1977 and the Sociedade Esportiva Palmeiras in several times.

Brandão was born in Taquara, Rio Grande do Sul. He also coached Cruzeiro, Palmeiras, Corinthians, São Paulo, Portuguesa, Santos, Botafogo-SP, Portuguesa Santista, Vila Nova-GO, Independiente and Peñarol.

== Managerial statistics ==
Team	Nation	From	To	Record							
Team	Nation	From	To	G	W	D	L	F	A	GD	Win %
Palmeiras	Brazil	1 October 1945	18 March 1946	6	5	1	0	16	4	+12	83.33
Palmeiras	Brazil	10 April 1947	20 January 1948	25	19	3	3	56	21	+35	76
Santos FC	Brazil	1 May 1948	29 January 1951	64	39	11	14	152	105	+47	60.94
Portuguesa	Brazil	30 January 1951	8 February 1954	112	61	20	31	269	189	+80	54.46
Corinthians	Brazil	2 May 1954	1 February 1958	151	97	34	20	347	192	+155	64.24
Brazil	Brazil	17 November 1955	10 February 1956	6	2	3	1	7	8	-1	33.33
Brazil	Brazil	13 March 1957	21 April 1957	8	5	1	2	25	10	+15	62.5
Palmeiras	Brazil	12 February 1958	30 December 1960	148	86	28	34	326	189	+137	58.11
Independiente	Argentina	15 March 1961	20 January 1963	60	24	20	16	87	70	+17	40
São Paulo	Brazil	1 February 1963	20 December 1963	39	21	10	8	67	42	+25	53.85
Corinthians	Brazil	1 March 1964	20 December 1966	122	66	26	30	237	159	+78	64.24
Brazil (interim)	Brazil	16 November 1965	16 November 1965	1	0	0	1	0	2	-2	0
Independiente	Argentina	20 February 1967	20 December 1967	38	22	9	7	76	31	+45	57.89
Corinthians	Brazil	1 February 1968	4 July 1968	26	14	6	6	46	28	+18	53.85
Peñarol	Uruguay	10 January 1969	28 December 1970	70	38	25	7	120	52	+67	54.29
São Paulo	Brazil	18 February 1971	11 October 1971	36	20	8	8	48	32	+16	55.56
Palmeiras	Brazil	22 November 1971	14 July 1975	197	110	60	27	280	129	+151	55.84
Brazil	Brazil	20 July 1975	21 February 1977	25	20	3	2	51	16	+35	80
Corinthians	Brazil	22 February 1977	30 July 1978	140	73	39	28	191	108	+83	52.14
Palmeiras	Brazil	11 April 1980	11 August 1980	28	9	10	9	31	32	-1	32.14
Corinthians	Brazil	13 August 1980	1981	87	33	29	25	112	95	+17	37.93
Cruzeiro	Brazil	10 January 1984	2 July 1984	13	5	3	5	24	20	+4	38.46
Vila Nova	Brazil	15 February 1986	10 August 1986	32	12	10	10	31	26	+5	37.5
Total				1,513	826	385	302	2,754	1,615	+1139	54.59

== Honours ==
=== Player ===
Internacional

- Campeonato Gaúcho: 1940, 1941, 1942
- Campeonato Citadino de Porto Alegre: 1936, 1940, 1941, 1942
- Torneio Início de Porto Alegre: 1937, 1938, 1940, 1941, 1942

Palmeiras

- Taça dos Campeões Estaduais Rio – São Paulo: 1942
- Campeonato Paulista: 1942, 1944
- Torneio Início Paulista: 1942

=== Manager ===
Palmeiras

- Campeonato Paulista: 1947, 1959, 1972, 1974
- Campeonato Brasileiro Série A: 1960, 1972, 1973
- Taça Cidade de São Paulo: 1945, 1946
- Torneio Início Paulista: 1946
- Taça dos Campeões Estaduais Rio – São Paulo: 1947
- Torneio Laudo Natel: 1972

Santos

- Taça Cidade de São Paulo: 1949

Portuguesa

- Fita Azul: 1951, 1953
- Torneio Rio-São Paulo: 1952

Corinthians

- Torneio Rio-São Paulo: 1954, 1966
- Campeonato Paulista: 1954, 1977
- Torneio Início Paulista: 1955
- Taça Cidade de São Paulo: 1978

Independiente

- Argentine Primera División: 1967

Peñarol

- Uruguayan Primera División runner-up: 1969, 1970
- Copa Libertadores runner-up: 1970

São Paulo

- Campeonato Paulista: 1971

Cruzeiro

- Campeonato Mineiro: 1984

Brazil

- Panamerican Championship: 1956

== See also ==
- List of football managers with the most matches
