= Los Auténticos Decadentes =

Argentine musical group

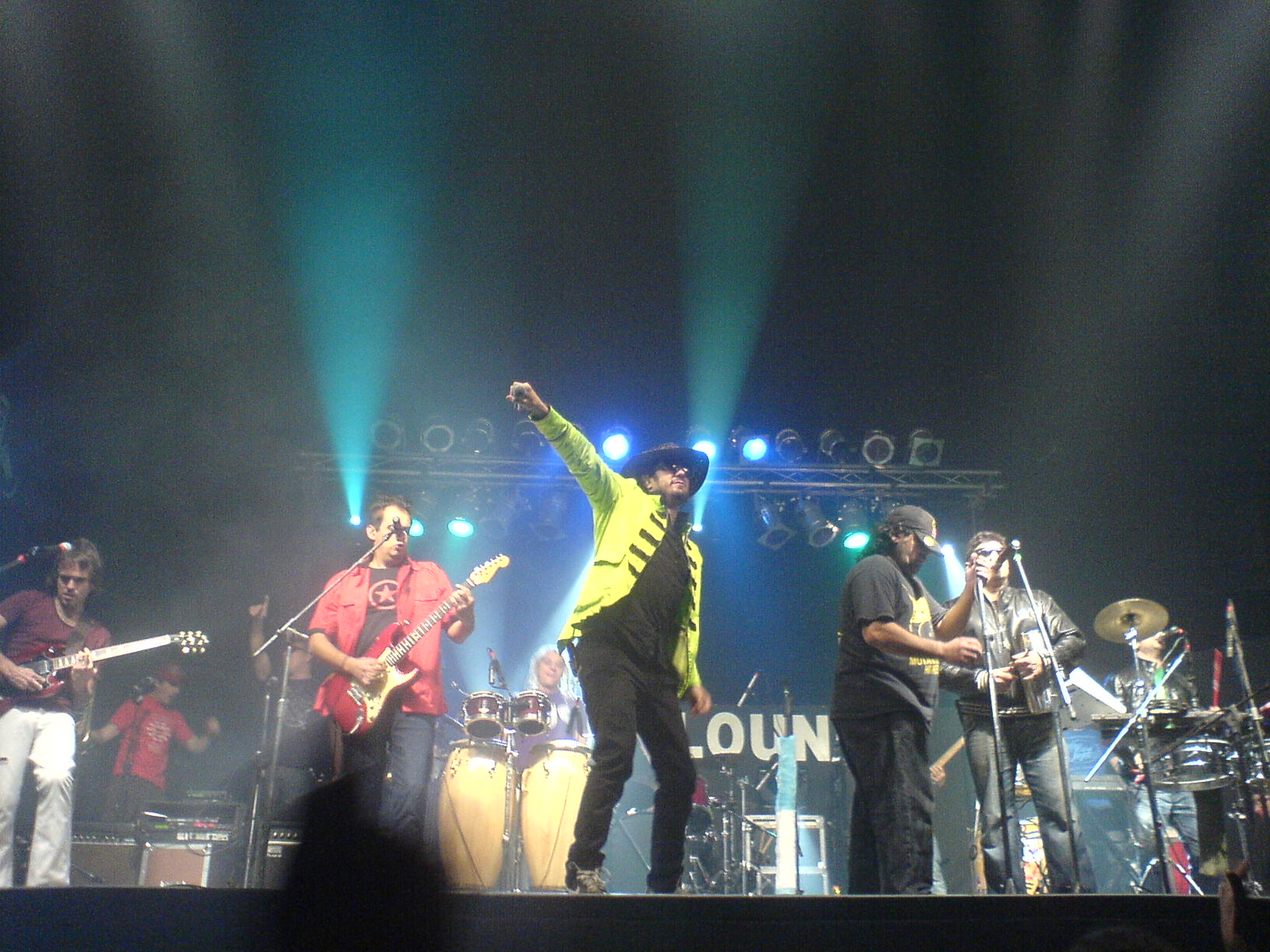

Background information
- Origin: Buenos Aires, Argentina
- Genres: Ska, reggae, rock
- Years active: 1986–present
- Labels: Radio Tripoli (1987-1989); Sony Music(1990-); RCA Records (1991-1999); Ariola (2000-2002); Tocka Discos (2003-).
- Members: Gustavo Parisi; Jorge Serrano; Diego Demarco; Gustavo Montecchia; Gastón Bernardou; Martín Lorenzo; Daniel Zimbello; Pablo Armesto; Pablo Rodríguez; Eduardo Tripodi; Mariano Franceschelli; Guillermo Eijo
- Website: www.losautenticosdecadentes.com.ar

Los Auténticos Decadentes (Spanish for "The Authentic Decadents") is an Argentine band that mixes ska with Latin America rhythms. The band was formed around the year 1986 by Cucho and Nito, who invited Gastón to join them.

Their first hit was Veni Raquel, which set the tone for the irreverence and ironic humor of their later lyrics. Many of their songs are classic anthems of the Argentine nightlife, such as Corazón, Loco (Tu Forma de Ser), Entregá el Marrón, La Guitarra, Los Piratas and El Murguero.

For some of their hit songs and videos, the Decandentes have engaged many Argentine icons such as former soccer referee Guillermo Nimo and the later candombe singer Alberto Castillo. As they draw from traditions such as canzonetta, murga bands and cantina songs, they are popular with many generations.

== Members ==
- Gustavo "Cucho" Parisi - vocals
- Jorge Serrano - guitars, vocals, choirs and pinkillo
- Diego Demarco - guitars, vocals, choirs
- Nito Montecchia- guitars, choirs
- Gastón "Francés" Bernardou - percussion, effects and synthesisers
- Martín "La Mosca" Lorenzo - percussion and choirs
- Daniel Zimbello - trombone
- Pablo Armesto - bass guitar and choirs
- Pablo Rodriguez - saxophone, flute and pincullo
- Eduardo Tripodi - percussion and choirs
- Mariano Franceschelli - drums, bass guitar, percussion and choirs
- Guillermo "Capanga" Eijo - trumpet and choirs

Occasional guest: Claudio Carrozza - keyboards.

== Discography ==
They have 10 studio albums and a few compilations, singles and live albums:

- El Milagro Argentino (The Argentine Miracle) (1989)
- Super Sónico (Supersonic) (1991)
- Fiesta monstruo (Monster Party) (1993)
- Mi vida loca (My Crazy Life) (1995)
- Cualquiera puede cantar (Anyone Can Sing) (1997)
- Hoy trasnoche (Pulled an All-Nighter) (2000)
- Los reyes de la canción (The Kings of Songs) (2001, greatest hits compilation)
- Sigue tu camino (Follow Your Path) (2003)
- 12 Vivos (12 Lives) (2004, live performances compilation)
- Los autenticos decadentes: Obras Cumbres (2006, greatest hits compilation)
- Club Atlético Decadente (Decadent Athletic Club) (2006)
- Somos (En Vivo) (We Are (Live)) (2008, live concert)
- Lo mejor de lo peor (Best of the Worst) (2009, greatest hits compilation)
- Irrompibles (Unbreakable) (2010)
- Los Machos Single (2010, single)
- Distrito Federal Single (2010, single)
- Tribus Urbanas Single (2010, single)
- Hecho en México - en vivo en el Palacio de los deportes, 25 aniversario (2012, live concert)
- Y La Banda Sigue (And the Band Plays On) (2014)
- KLUB (2017, tribute album)
- Fiesta Nacional (MTV Unplugged) (Live)
