= Rubén Pagnanini =

Argentine footballer

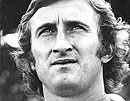

Personal information
- Full name: Rubén Oscar Pagnanini
- Date of birth: 31 January 1949 (age 77)
- Place of birth: San Nicolás de los Arroyos, Argentina
- Height: 1.78 m (5 ft 10 in)
- Position: Right back

Senior career*
Years	Team	Apps	(Gls)
1968–1977	Estudiantes	329	(22)
1977–1979	Independiente	70	(2)
1980	Argentinos Juniors	2	(0)
1981	Minnesota Kicks	13	(0)
Total		414	(24)

International career
	Argentina	3	(?)
Medal record
Representing Argentina
FIFA World Cup
Winner	1978 Argentina	Team
- * Club domestic league appearances and goals as of 25 August 2007

Rubén Oscar Pagnanini (born 31 January 1949 in San Nicolás de los Arroyos, Buenos Aires Province) is an Argentine former football player who played as a defender for the Argentina national team.

He played for Estudiantes de La Plata, Club Atlético Independiente, Argentinos Juniors and Minnesota Kicks. Playing for Estudiantes, he won the 1969 Copa Libertadores and 1970 Copa Libertadores. His greatest achievements at the local club level were winning the Nacional championships of 1977 and 1978 with Independiente.

Pagnanini was part of the 1978 Argentina national football team that won that year's World Cup, though he did not play in any match during that tournament.

His nickname was el gato ('the cat').

In 2007, he worked as the coach of La Emilia, a club playing in the Torneo Argentino B league (4th division).

== Honours ==
=== Club ===
Estudiantes

- Copa Libertadores: 1968, 1969, 1970
- Copa Interamericana: 1968
- Intercontinental Cup: 1968

Independiente

- Argentine Primera División: Nacional 1977,Nacional 1978

=== International ===
Argentina

- FIFA World Cup: 1978
