= 1969 Campeonato Ecuatoriano de Fútbol Serie A =

Campeonato Ecuatoriano de Fútbol
- Season: 1969
- Champions: LDU Quito (1st title)
- 1970 Copa Libertadores: LDU Quito; América de Quito
- Matches: 182
- Goals: 543 (2.98 per match)
- Top goalscorer: Francisco Bertocchi (26 goals)
- Biggest home win: LDU Quito 7–0 Patria
- Biggest away win: América de Ambato 0–11 LDU Quito
- Highest scoring: América de Ambato 0–11 LDU Quito

The 1969 Campeonato Ecuatoriano de Fútbol (English: Ecuadorian Football Championship) was the 11th national championship for football teams in Ecuador. LDU Quito won their first national title.

== Teams ==
Fourteen teams participated this season (home city in parentheses).

- América (Ambato)
- América (Quito)
- Aucas (Quito)
- Barcelona (Guayaquil)
- Deportivo Quito (Quito)
- El Nacional (Quito)
- Emelec (Guayaquil)
- Everest (Guayaquil)
- INECEL (Manta)
- LDU Quito (Quito)
- Manta Sport (Manta)
- Norte América (Guayaquil)
- Patria (Guayaquil)
- Universidad Católica (Quito)

== Standings ==
Pos	Team	Pld	W	D	L	GF	GA	GD	Pts	Qualification or relegation
1	LDU Quito (C, Q)	26	19	4	3	75	20	+55	42	Qualified for the 1970 Copa Libertadores
2	América de Quito (Q)	26	15	7	4	39	18	+21	37	Qualified for the 1970 Copa Libertadores
3	Aucas	26	16	4	6	50	27	+23	36	
4	Barcelona	26	14	5	7	35	20	+15	33	
5	El Nacional	26	13	6	7	56	36	+20	32	
6	Emelec	26	11	9	6	34	28	+6	31	
7	Deportivo Quito	26	12	6	8	40	28	+12	30	
8	Everest	26	8	9	9	46	45	+1	25	
9	Universidad Católica	26	9	4	13	34	47	−13	22	
10	Patria	26	8	5	13	28	36	−8	21	
11	Norte América (R)	26	7	5	14	24	40	−16	19	Relegated to the Segunda Categoría
12	Manta (R)	26	7	3	16	33	59	−26	17	Relegated to the Segunda Categoría
13	América de Ambato (R)	26	5	3	18	32	72	−40	13	Relegated to the Segunda Categoría
14	INECEL (R)	26	2	2	22	17	67	−50	6	Relegated to the Segunda Categoría

Source: RSSSF - 1969 Serie A
(C) Champions; (Q) Qualified for the phase indicated; (R) Relegated

Campeonato Ecuatoriano de Fútbol
1969 champion

1st title

== Results ==
Home \ Away	AMA	AMQ	AUC	BAR	QUI	NAC	EME	EVE	INE	LDQ	MSC	NAM	PAT	CAT
América de Ambato		0–2	2–4	1–2	1–0	2–6	3–4	1–1	3–0	0–11	5–3	0–0	2–0	3–4
América de Quito	4–1		1–0	3–0	1–0	1–0	2–0	1–0	2–0	0–1	4–0	1–1	0–0	1–1
Aucas	3–0	2–1		1–0	1–0	1–1	1–1	2–1	2–0	2–3	4–0	3–1	3–0	1–0
Barcelona	3–1	0–1	2–2		0–1	2–1	0–1	4–0	1–0	3–1	3–0	3–1	1–0	1–0
Deportivo Quito	3–0	1–1	1–3	0–0		0–2	3–2	8–2	1–0	2–1	3–1	2–0	1–0	1–0
El Nacional	3–1	1–2	1–3	0–0	6–3		1–0	1–1	2–1	1–3	4–1	3–1	1–0	5–1
Emelec	2–2	2–0	2–1	1–0	0–0	1–1		0–0	3–0	3–2	3–2	0–1	1–1	2–0
Everest	2–0	2–4	1–0	1–1	0–0	3–1	1–1		9–1	0–0	2–3	1–2	0–0	5–2
INECEL	0–1	1–2	1–3	0–4	0–1	1–3	0–1	3–5		1–7	1–0	0–0	0–4	1–1
LDU Quito	2–0	1–1	2–1	3–0	1–1	1–1	1–0	3–1	5–1		2–0	2–0	7–0	1–0
Manta	4–3	0–0	2–0	0–2	1–1	1–3	1–1	3–5	2–0	0–3		1–0	4–1	2–0
Norte América	3–0	2–2	2–3	0–1	1–5	2–2	0–1	0–1	1–0	1–5	1–0		2–1	2–1
Patria	3–0	0–1	0–0	1–2	1–0	2–1	3–0	1–1	2–5	0–1	6–2	1–0		0–1
Universidad Católica	3–0	2–1	2–4	0–0	3–2	2–5	2–2	3–1	2–0	1–6	2–0	1–0	0–1	

Legend: Blue = home team win; Yellow = draw; Red = away team win.

== Record match ==
The Serie A record for the largest margin of victory was set this season on October 26. LDU Quito beat América de Ambato 11–0 in Ambato. In this game, Uruguayan Francisco Bertocchi also set a record for individual goalscoring in a single match with 8 goals.
