= 1969 Argentine Primera División =

78th season of top-tier football league in Argentina

Primera División
- Season: 1969
- Dates: 21 February – 22 December
- Champions: Chacarita Juniors (Metropolitano); Boca Juniors (Nacional)

The 1969 Primera División season was the 78th season of top-flight football in Argentina. The entire season (Metropolitano and Nacional championship) ran from 21 February to 22 December. Club Deportivo Morón and Unión de Santa Fe were promoted from Primera B Metropolitana via "Torneo de Reclasificación".

The Metropolitano was won by Chacarita Juniors (1st title in Primera División) while Boca Juniors won the Nacional (17th league title).

Unlike previous editions, in 1969 there was only one team relegated, Deportivo Morón.

== Campeonato Metropolitano ==
Metropolitano
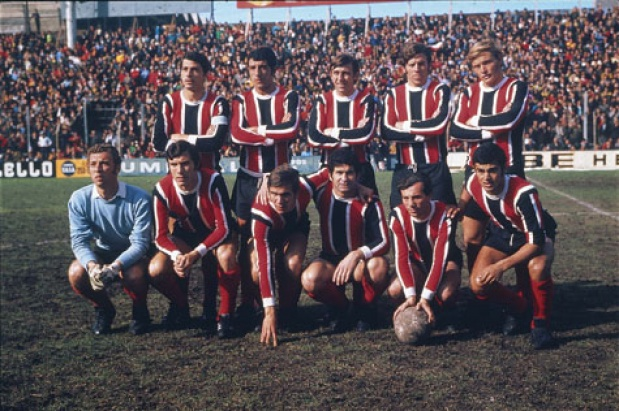
- Chacarita Juniors, Metropolitano champions
- Season: 1969
- Dates: 21 February – 22 December
- Champions: Chacarita Juniors (1st title)
- Promoted: Dep. Morón; Unión (SF)
- Relegated: Dep. Morón
- Top goalscorer: (Brazil) Walter Machado da Silva (13 goals)

=== Group A ===
Pos	Team	Pld	W	D	L	GF	GA	GD	Pts	Qualification or relegation
1	Boca Juniors	22	12	6	4	34	11	+23	30	to semifinals
2	Chacarita Juniors	22	13	4	5	33	26	+7	30	to semifinals
3	Vélez Sársfield	22	9	8	5	36	24	+12	26	to Campeonato Nacional
4	Independiente	22	10	5	7	28	25	+3	25	to Campeonato Nacional
5	San Lorenzo	22	10	3	9	37	27	+10	23	to Campeonato Nacional
5	Lanús	22	8	7	7	37	34	+3	23	to Campeonato Nacional
5	Gimnasia y Esgrima (LP)	22	10	3	9	28	27	+1	23	to Petit Tournament
8	Rosario Central	22	6	9	7	18	24	−6	21	to Petit Tournament
9	Banfield	22	6	8	8	24	36	−12	20	to Reclasificatorio
10	Colón	22	4	6	12	22	43	−21	14	to Reclasificatorio
11	Atlanta	22	2	5	15	18	37	−19	9	to Reclasificatorio

=== Group B ===
Pos	Team	Pld	W	D	L	GF	GA	GD	Pts	Qualification or relegation
1	Racing	22	14	7	1	45	16	+29	35	to semifinals
2	River Plate	22	12	7	3	35	21	+14	31	to semifinals
3	Estudiantes (LP)	22	11	5	6	33	24	+9	27	to Campeonato Nacional
4	Huracán	22	8	8	6	38	29	+9	24	to Campeonato Nacional
5	Platense	22	8	7	7	33	32	+1	23	to Campeonato Nacional
6	Quilmes	22	8	6	8	28	34	−6	22	to Campeonato Nacional
7	Newell's Old Boys	22	5	11	6	24	28	−4	21	to Petit Tournament
8	Unión	22	7	5	10	22	26	−4	19	to Petit Tournament
9	Argentinos Juniors	22	2	9	11	17	29	−12	13	to Reclasificatorio
9	Deportivo Morón	22	5	3	14	16	38	−22	13	to Reclasificatorio
11	Los Andes	22	1	10	11	24	39	−15	12	to Reclasificatorio

=== Semifinals ===
* Winner of the series

Date	Team 1	Res.	Team 2	Venue	City
2 Jul	Chacarita Juniors	1–0	Racing	Boca Juniors Stadium	Buenos Aires
3 Jul	Boca Juniors	0–0 (Note: River Plate qualified to the final by "goals for" difference (35–34))	River Plate	Racing Stadium	Avellaneda

=== Final ===
Date	Team 1	Team 2	Res.	Venue	City
6 July	Chacarita Juniors	River Plate	4–1	Racing Stadium	Avellaneda

==== Match details ====
1969 Campeonato Metropolitano Final
July 6, 1969

Chacarita Juniors	4–1	River Plate
Neumann 12', 37'; Marcos 47'; Frassoldati 56'	Report	Trebucq 18'

Racing Stadium, Avellaneda
Attendance: 64,441
Referee: Roberto Barreiro

=== Petit Tournament ===
Pos	Team	Pld	W	D	L	GF	GA	GD	Pts	Qualification
1	Unión (SF)	2	2	0	0	7	3	+4	4	to Nacional
2	Newell's Old Boys	2	1	0	1	4	4	0	2	to Reclasificatorio
3	Rosario Central	1	0	0	1	0	1	−1	0	to Reclasificatorio
4	Gimnasia y Esgrima LP	1	0	0	1	0	3	−3	0	to Reclasificatorio

==== Matches ====
- Newell's Old Boys 1–0 Rosario Central
- Gimnasia y Esgrima LP 0-3 Unión (SF)
- Unión (SF) 4–3 Newell's Old Boys

=== Reclasificatorio "A" Tournament ===
Teams placed 9th to 11th in each zone of Metropolitano championship, plus 3 teams eliminated from Petit tournament, contested the "Torneo Reclasificatorio". Out of those 9 clubs, teams placed 1st to 7th would remain in Primera División while the last two teams plus two first of Primera B Metropolitana "Campeonato Zone" would play a new Reclasificatorio to determine which would be promoted or relegated.

Los Andes won the Reclasificatorio A, with no official title awarded.

Pos	Team	Pld	W	D	L	GF	GA	GD	Pts	Qualification
1	Los Andes	16	8	6	2	21	14	+7	22	winner
2	Gimnasia y Esgrima (LP)	16	8	5	3	29	22	+7	21	
3	Atlanta	16	8	3	5	24	19	+5	19	
4	Colón	16	6	2	8	25	25	0	14	
5	Argentinos Juniors	16	6	2	8	19	23	−4	14	
6	Newell's Old Boys	16	5	4	7	17	19	−2	14	
7	Rosario Central	16	4	6	6	13	13	0	14	
8	Deportivo Morón	16	6	1	9	22	24	−2	13	to second step
9	Banfield	16	6	1	9	11	22	−11	13	to second step

=== Reclasificatorio de Primera Tournament ===
Contested by the two last teams of Torneo Reclasificación plus two teams from Primera B

Pos	Team	Pld	W	D	L	GF	GA	GD	Pts	Qualification
1	Banfield	3	2	0	1	5	2	+3	4	Remained in Primera División
2	Deportivo Morón	3	1	1	1	4	5	−1	3	Relegated
3	Ferro Carril Oeste	3	1	1	1	4	5	−1	3	Remained in Primera B
4	San Telmo	3	1	0	2	4	5	−1	2	Remained in Primera B

=== Top scorers ===
Rank.	Player	Team	Goals
1	(Brazil) Machado da Silva	Racing	14
2	(Paraguay) Bernardo Acosta	Lanús	13
3	(Argentina) Eduardo Flores	Estudiantes LP	12
3	(Argentina) Omar Wehbe	Vélez Sarsfield	12
4	(Argentina) Roque Avallay	Newell's Old Boys	10

== Campeonato Nacional ==
=== Final standings ===
Nacional
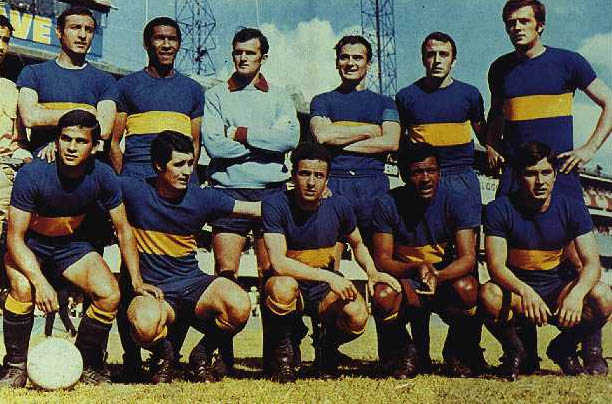
- Boca Juniors, Nacional champions
- Season: 1969
- Dates: 5 September – 14 December
- Champions: Boca Juniors (17th title)
- 1970 Copa Libertadores: Boca Juniors; River Plate
- Top goalscorer: (Argentina) Carlos Bulla (Argentina) Rodolfo Fischer (14 goals each)

Pos	Team	Pld	W	D	L	GF	GA	GD	Pts	Qualification
1	Boca Juniors	17	13	3	1	35	11	+24	29	to 1970 Copa Libertadores
2	River Plate	17	11	5	1	34	11	+23	27	to 1970 Copa Libertadores
2	San Lorenzo	17	12	3	2	41	18	+23	27	
4	Independiente	17	11	3	3	36	14	+22	25	
5	Quilmes	17	9	1	7	35	30	+5	19	
6	Vélez Sársfield	17	6	7	4	22	14	+8	19	
7	Chacarita Juniors	17	6	6	5	26	26	0	18	
8	Racing	17	7	3	7	25	20	+5	17	
9	Huracán	17	7	3	7	22	18	+4	17	
10	Estudiantes (LP)	17	7	2	8	26	26	0	16	
11	Talleres (C)	17	6	2	9	22	35	−13	14	
12	San Martín (M)	17	3	8	6	17	30	−13	14	
13	Desamparados	17	5	3	9	28	38	−10	13	
14	Lanús	17	5	2	10	18	24	−6	12	
15	Platense	17	2	6	9	25	35	−10	10	
16	Unión	17	3	6	8	17	26	−9	12	
17	San Martín (T)	17	2	5	10	14	41	−27	9	
18	San Lorenzo (MdP)	17	3	2	12	18	44	−26	8	

=== 2nd place playoffs ===
After River Plate and San Lorenzo finished equaled on points, they played a two-legged series in neutral venues to determine which team would be the second qualified for 1970 Copa Libertadores:

* Winner of the series

Team 1	Team 2	1st. leg	Venue 1	City 1	2nd. leg	Venue 2	City 2	Agg.
River Plate	San Lorenzo	1–0	Vélez Sarsfield Stadium	Buenos Aires	3–2	Racing Stadium	Avellaneda	4–2

=== Top scorers ===
Rank.	Player	Team	Goals
1	(Argentina) Carlos Bulla	Platense	14
1	(Argentina) Rodolfo Fischer	San Lorenzo	14
2	(Argentina) Oscar Más	River Plate	13
2	(Argentina) Héctor Yazalde	Independiente	13
3	(Argentina) Carlos Bianchi	Vélez Sarsfield	12
