= Nilo Acuña =

Uruguayan footballer (1943-2004)

Personal information
- Full name: Nilo Humberto Acuña Bordaborria
- Date of birth: 26 September 1943
- Place of birth: Montevideo, Uruguay
- Date of death: 29 August 2004 (aged 60)
- Place of death: Uruguay
- Position: Forward

Senior career*
| Years | Team | Apps | (Gls) |
| –1966 | Liverpool Montevideo | | |
| 1967–1972 | Peñarol | | |
| 1972–1975 | Monterrey | | |
| 1975–1976 | Peñarol | | |

International career
- Uruguay
- * Club domestic league appearances and goals

Nilo Humberto Acuña Bordaborria (26 September 1943 – 29 August 2004) was a professional footballer who played in the Uruguayan Primera División and Mexican Primera División.

== Career ==
Born in Montevideo, Acuña played as a forward. He began playing for Liverpool de Montevideo, before joining Peñarol in 1967. He won consecutive Uruguayan league titles in 1967 and 1968, and helped the club reach the 1970 Copa Libertadores final in his first stint with the club.

In 1972, Acuña moved to Mexico to join Monterrey for three seasons. He returned to Uruguay to finish his career with Peñarol.

After he retired from playing, Acuña became a football coach. He was a member of Jorge Fossati's staff which led LDU Quito to the 2003 Ecuadorian league title. In 2004, he joined Fossati's coaching staff on the Uruguay national football team.

== Personal ==
Acuña developed a tumor and died at age 60 in August 2004.
