= Raúl Madero (footballer) =

Argentine sports physician and footballer (1939–2021)

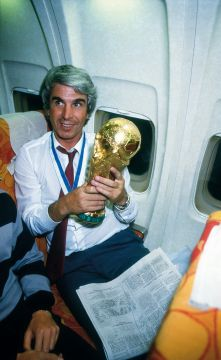
- Madero with the World Cup in 1986

Personal information
- Full name: Raúl Horacio Madero
- Date of birth: 21 May 1939
- Place of birth: Buenos Aires, Argentina
- Date of death: 24 December 2021 (aged 82)
- Position: Defender

Senior career*
Years	Team	Apps	(Gls)
1959–1961	Boca Juniors	5	(0)
1962	Huracán		
1963–1970	Estudiantes	179	(9)

International career
1964–1969	Argentina	5	(0)
- * Club domestic league appearances and goals as of July 2007

Raúl Horacio Madero (21 May 1939 – 24 December 2021) was an Argentine sports physician and football player. He served two terms as the physician of the Argentina national football team.

== Sporting career ==
As a teenager, Madero was drawn initially to basketball, but decided on football when it became clear he had the talent to make it in the professional league. He played for Boca Juniors and Huracán but he came into his own with the Estudiantes de La Plata team that won several national and international titles between 1967 and 1970. He was also cited for the national team. He scored only nine goals for Estudiantes, but one of these goals was a crucial header against Quilmes that helped Estudiantes avoid relegation.

Madero provided firmness but also elegance as a defender, playing alongside the less-polished Ramón Aguirre Suárez.

== Medical career ==
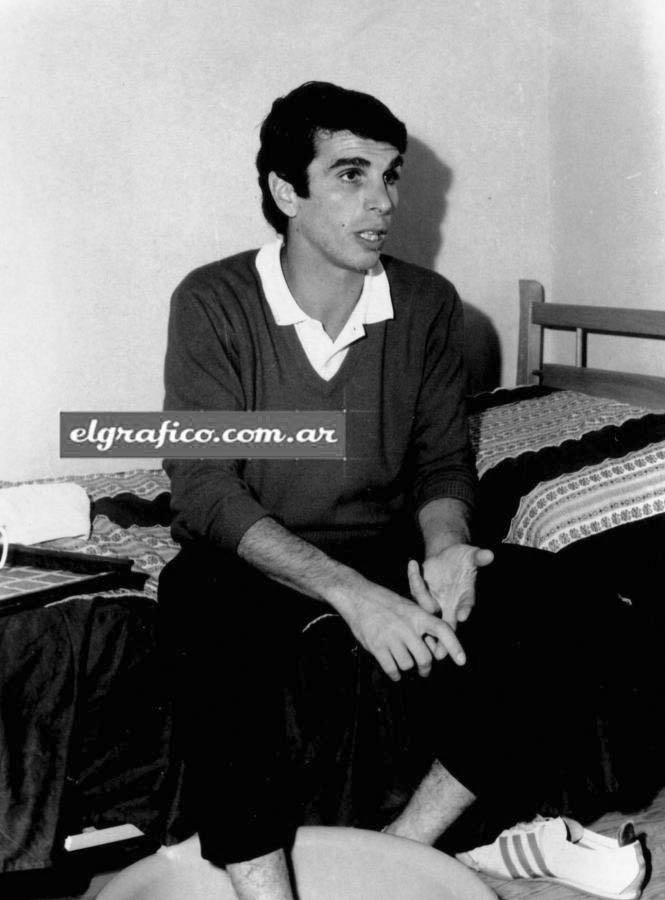
Madero in 1969

Madero and fellow player Carlos Bilardo retired after graduating as Medical Doctors. While Bilardo remained in football as a coach, Madero chose to specialize in sports medicine. In the late 1970s, he was team physician at Argentinos Juniors. When Diego Maradona transferred from Argentinos to Boca Juniors, Madero went with him and took part in the successful 1981 championship campaign.

In 1983, newly minted national coach Bilardo asked his friend Madero to be the physician of the Argentina national football team. Madero accepted, and remained in the position until 1990. Argentina was champion of FIFA World Cup 1986 and finalist in the 1990 edition. The fitness trainer was another Estudiantes veteran, Ricardo Echevarría.

After Bilardo's departure and a tenure as head of medicine with the Argentine Football Association, in 1996 Madero was made a member of FIFA's Sports Medical Committee and the FIFA Medical Assessment and Research Centre (F-MARC).

In 2007, Madero was designated again as physician for the national team under coach Alfio Basile, who was Madero's teammate in the national team in the late sixties. Madero endorsed FIFA's decision to prohibit the playing of international matches at a height of 2500 m (8200 ft) and above, citing medical concerns (notably, the increased incidence of respiratory alkalosis when playing in oxygen-poor environments).

In 2009, Maradona and Bilardo, now coach and manager of the national team, decided to reinstate Donato Villani as team physician, thus ending Madero's second term.

Madero was also head of the Sports Medicine program in the Buenos Aires branch of the Pontifical Catholic University of Argentina.

== Personal life and death ==
Madero died on 24 December 2021, at the age of 82.

== Honours ==
Estudiantes

- Primera División Argentina: Metropolitano 1967
- Copa Libertadores: 1968, 1969, 1970
- Copa Interamericana: 1968
- Intercontinental Cup: 1968
