= Campo Santo, Salta =

Municipality and town in Salta Province, Argentina

Coordinates: 24°40′58″S 65°06′18″W

Campo Santo (Salta)
- Municipality and town
- Interactive map of Campo Santo (Salta)
- Country: Argentina
- Province: Salta Province

Government
  - Type: Municipality
  - Intendant: Facundo Ignacio Taché
- Time zone: UTC−3 (ART)

Campo Santo (Salta) is a town and municipality in Salta Province in northwestern Argentina.
