= Guillermo Nimo =

Argentine football referee and commentator (1932-2013)

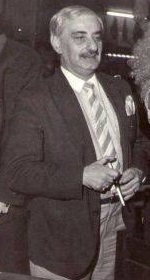
- Full name: Guillermo José Nimo
- Born: 22 February 1932; Buenos Aires, Argentina
- Died: 12 January 2013 (aged 80); Buenos Aires, Argentina

Domestic
Years	League	Role

International
Years	League	Role

Guillermo José Nimo (22 February 1932 – 12 January 2013) was an Argentine football referee and later sports commentator. Active in domestic and international officiating, he subsequently became a prominent media figure in Argentine football broadcasting.

== Refereeing career ==
Nimo was born on 22 February 1932 in Buenos Aires, Argentina. He worked as a football referee in Argentina and officiated international matches, including fixtures involving national teams documented in official match records.

His refereeing career has been associated with one of the most frequently cited controversies in Argentine football history. In a decisive match, he did not sanction a handball incident that later became widely discussed in retrospective accounts of the sport and has been described as influencing the outcome of a championship involving major clubs.

== Media career ==
Following his retirement from officiating, Nimo transitioned into sports media, where he established himself as a media figure as a commentator and television personality. He became known for his analysis of matches and refereeing decisions, contributing to his recognition within Argentine football culture.

Nimo died on 12 January 2013 in Buenos Aires at the age of 80. Contemporary reports noted both his career as a referee and his later prominence as a media commentator.
