= Marcos Conigliaro =

Argentine footballer (1942–2026)

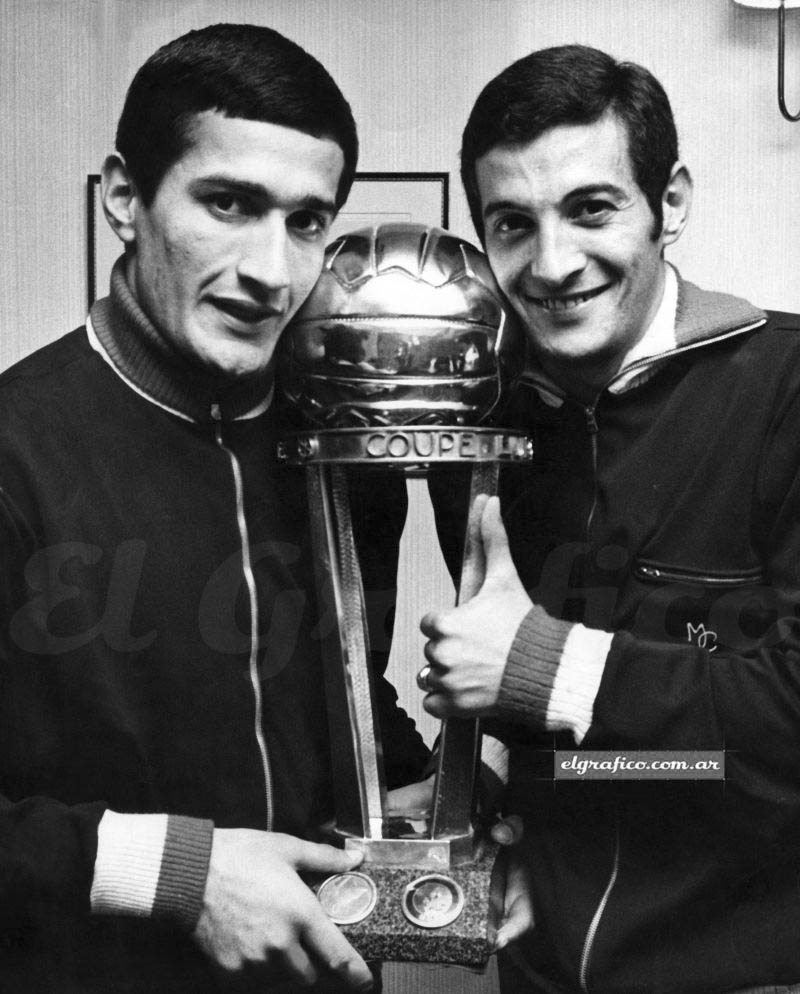
- Conigliaro (right) and Juan Ramón Verón with the 1968 Intercontinental Cup

Personal information
- Full name: Marcos Norberto Conigliaro
- Date of birth: December 9, 1942
- Place of birth: Quilmes, Buenos Aires Province, Argentina
- Date of death: March 20, 2026 (aged 83)
- Place of death: San Jorge, Argentina
- Positions: Forward; midfielder

Senior career*
Years	Team	Apps	(Gls)
1959–1961	Quilmes	9	(2)
1962–1963	Independiente	21	(4)
1964	Chacarita Juniors	29	(10)
1965–1970	Estudiantes	196	(46)
1971–1972	Jalisco		
1972–1974	Oudenaarde		
1974–1975	Lugano	33	(6)
1976	Everton	0	(0)

Managerial career
- 1977-1979: Nueva Chicago
- 1980-1981: Deportivo Armenio
- 1982: All Boys
- 1983: Unión Santa Fe
- San Jorge
- * Club domestic league appearances and goals

Marcos Norberto Conigliaro (December 9, 1942 – March 20, 2026) was an Argentine football coach and professional player.

== Biography ==
Conigliaro was born in Quilmes on December 9, 1942. As a player, he was a forward renowned for his technical ability. He played for many clubs in Argentina and abroad. His debut in Argentina was with Quilmes at the age of 15. He then played for Independiente, Chacarita Juniors, Estudiantes, Jalisco, Belgian club K.S.V. Oudenaarde, Swiss side Lugano, and Everton.

In 1965, he arrived to Estudiantes de La Plata, who were a dominant force in Argentine and South American football during the late 1960s. During his time in Estudiantes, Conigliaro won three Copa Libertadores and the 1968 Intercontinental Cup. In the first leg of that year’s Intercontinental Cup, he scored the only and therefore winning goal against Manchester United. Overall, Conigliaro played in 277 games, scoring 65 goals.

As a player, he won seven championships: six playing for Estudiantes (1967 Metropolitano, 1968-1970 Copa Libertadores, 1968 Intercontinental Cup, and 1969 Interamericana Cup ) and one playing for Independiente (1963 AFA Championship).

After he retired from soccer, Conigliaro became a coach. He coached Unión de Santa Fe in the Argentine first division. From 1996, he coached San Jorge from Santa Fe, which plays in the Argentino B division.

Conigliaro died on March 20, 2026, at the age of 83.
