= 1970 Copa Libertadores =

11th season of Copa Libertadores

Copa Libertadores de América
Tournament details
- Dates: February 11 - May 14
- Teams: 19 (from 9 confederations)

Final positions
- Champions: (Argentina) Estudiantes (LP) (3rd title)
- Runners-up: (Uruguay) Peñarol

Tournament statistics
- Matches played: 88
- Goals scored: 253 (2.88 per match)
- Top scorer: (Uruguay) Francisco Bertocchi (9 goals)

The 1970 Copa Libertadores de América was the 11th edition of CONMEBOL's top Association football club tournament. Estudiantes de La Plata successfully defended their title for the second straight year by defeating Peñarol in the finals. Teams from Brazil did not participate in this year's tournament due to CBF still disagreeing with the format.

== Qualified teams ==
Country	Team	Qualification method
CONMEBOL; 1 berth	Estudiantes (LP)	1969 Copa Libertadores winners
Argentina; 2 berths	Boca Juniors	1969 Primera División champion
Argentina; 2 berths	River Plate	1969 Primera División runner-up
Bolivia; 2 berths	Universitario de La Paz	1969 Primera División champion
Bolivia; 2 berths	Bolívar	1969 Primera División runner-up
Brazil; 2 berths	(None)	–
Chile; 2 berths	Universidad de Chile	1969 Primera División champion
Chile; 2 berths	Rangers	1969 Primera División runner-up
Colombia; 2 berths	Deportivo Cali	1969 Campeonato Profesional champion
Colombia; 2 berths	América de Cali	1969 Campeonato Profesional runner-up
Ecuador; 2 berths	LDU Quito	1969 Campeonato Ecuatoriano Serie A champion
Ecuador; 2 berths	América de Quito	1969 Campeonato Ecuatoriano Serie A runner-up
Paraguay; 2 berths	Guaraní	1969 Primera División champion
Paraguay; 2 berths	Olimpia	1969 Primera División runner-up
Peru; 2 berths	Universitario	1969 Descentralizado champion
Peru; 2 berths	Defensor Arica	1969 Descentralizado runner-up
Uruguay; 2 berths	Nacional	1969 Primera División champion
Uruguay; 2 berths	Peñarol	1969 Primera División runner-up
Venezuela; 2 berths	Deportivo Galicia	1969 Primera División champion
Venezuela; 2 berths	Valencia	1969 Primera División runner-up

== Draw ==
The champions and runners-up of each football association were drawn into the same group along with another football association's participating teams. Three clubs from Argentina competed as Estudiantes (LP) were the champions of the 1969 Copa Libertadores. They entered the tournament in the semifinals.

Group 1	Group 2	Group 3	Group 4
Argentina; Bolivia	Uruguay; Venezuela	Colombia; Chile; Paraguay	Ecuador; Peru

== Group Stage ==
=== Group 1 ===
Pos	Team	Pld	W	D	L	GF	GA	GD	Pts	Qualification	(Argentina) BOC	(Argentina) RIV	(Bolivia) BOL	(Bolivia) UNI
1	(Argentina) Boca Juniors	6	5	1	0	14	4	+10	11	Qualified to the Second phase		2–1	2–0	4–0
2	(Argentina) River Plate	6	3	1	2	15	6	+9	7		1–3		1–0	9–0
3	(Bolivia) Bolívar	6	1	2	3	7	9	−2	4		2–3	1–1		2–0
4	(Bolivia) Universitario de La Paz	6	0	2	4	2	19	−17	2		0–0	0–2	2–2	

=== Group 2 ===
Pos	Team	Pld	W	D	L	GF	GA	GD	Pts	Qualification	(Uruguay) NAC	(Uruguay) PEÑ	(Venezuela) VAL	(Venezuela) GAL
1	(Uruguay) Nacional	6	4	2	0	13	3	+10	10	Qualified to the Second phase		1–1	1–0	2–0
2	(Uruguay) Peñarol	6	3	3	0	17	4	+13	9		0–0		11–2	4–1
3	(Venezuela) Valencia	6	2	1	3	9	18	−9	5		2–5	0–0		3–1
4	(Venezuela) Deportivo Galicia	6	0	0	6	2	16	−14	0		0–4	0–1	0–2	

=== Group 3 ===
Pos	Team	Pld	W	D	L	GF	GA	GD	Pts	Qualification	(Paraguay) GUA	(Chile) UCH	(Paraguay) OLI	(Colombia) CAL	(Colombia) AME	(Chile) RAN
1	(Paraguay) Guaraní	10	5	5	0	12	4	+8	15	Qualified to the Second phase		1–0	1–0	1–1	4–1	2–0
2	Universidad de Chile	10	5	3	2	19	11	+8	13	Qualified to the Second phase	0–0		2–1	3–1	2–1	2–1
3	(Paraguay) Olimpia	10	4	4	2	19	11	+8	12		0–0	1–1		5–1	1–0	5–1
4	(Colombia) Deportivo Cali	10	5	2	3	18	16	+2	12		0–0	2–0	0–1		4–2	3–2
5	(Colombia) América de Cali	10	1	3	6	12	22	−10	5		2–2	2–2	1–1	2–4		1–0
6	(Chile) Rangers	10	1	1	8	11	27	−16	3		0–1	1–7	4–4	0–2	2–0	

=== Group 4 ===
Pos	Team	Pld	W	D	L	GF	GA	GD	Pts	Qualification	(Peru) UNI	(Ecuador) LDU	(Peru) DEF	(Ecuador) CDA
1	(Peru) Universitario	6	4	1	1	11	4	+7	9	Qualified to the Second Phase		2–0	2–1	3–0
2	(Ecuador) LDU Quito	6	3	1	2	10	6	+4	7	Qualified to the Second Phase	2–0		1–2	4–1
3	(Peru) Defensor Arica	6	1	3	2	5	6	−1	5		1–1	0–0		0–1
4	(Ecuador) América de Quito	6	1	1	4	4	14	−10	3		0–3	1–3	1–1	

== Second phase ==
From this phase onwards, the team that advanced from groups that had two teams (including the winner of the finals) had to decided by points (two for a win, one for a draw). If after two games, no one team had the most points, a single-game playoff was to be played on neutral grounds to determine who advanced (or wins as is the case for the finals). If the playoff game ended in a draw, goal difference will be used a tie-breaker.

=== Zone 1 ===
Pos	Team	Pld	W	D	L	GF	GA	GD	Pts	Qualification	(Argentina) RIV	(Argentina) BOC	(Peru) UNI
1	(Argentina) River Plate	4	3	1	0	9	5	+4	7	Qualified to the Third phase		1–0	5–3
2	(Argentina) Boca Juniors	4	2	1	1	5	3	+2	5		1–1		1–0
3	(Peru) Universitario	4	0	0	4	5	11	−6	0		1–2	1–3	

April 11, 1970

Universitario (Peru)	1 – 3	(Argentina) Boca Juniors

Lima, Peru

April 14, 1970

Universitario (Peru)	1 – 2	(Argentina) River Plate

Lima, Peru

April 16, 1970

River Plate (Argentina)	1 – 0	(Argentina) Boca Juniors

Buenos Aires, Argentina

April 22, 1970

Boca Juniors (Argentina)	1 – 0	(Peru) Universitario

Buenos Aires, Argentina

April 25, 1970

River Plate (Argentina)	5 – 3	(Peru) Universitario

Buenos Aires, Argentina

April 30, 1970

Boca Juniors (Argentina)	1 – 1	(Argentina) River Plate

Buenos Aires, Argentina

=== Zone 2 ===
Pos	Team	Pld	W	D	L	GF	GA	GD	Pts	Qualification	(Uruguay) PEÑ	(Paraguay) GUA	(Ecuador) LDU
1	(Uruguay) Peñarol	4	3	0	1	6	4	+2	6	Qualified to the Third Phase		1–0	2–1
2	(Paraguay) Guaraní	4	1	1	2	3	3	0	3		2–0		1–1
3	(Ecuador) LDU Quito	4	1	1	2	4	6	−2	3		1–3	1–0	

April 12, 1970

LDU Quito (Ecuador)	1 – 3	(Uruguay) Peñarol

Quito, Ecuador

April 19, 1970

Guaraní (Paraguay)	2 – 0	(Uruguay) Peñarol

Asunción, Paraguay

April 22, 1970

LDU Quito (Ecuador)	1 – 0	(Paraguay) Guaraní

Quito, Ecuador

April 26, 1970

Peñarol (Uruguay)	1 – 0	(Paraguay) Guaraní

Montevideo, Uruguay

April 29, 1970

Guaraní (Paraguay)	1 – 1	(Ecuador) LDU Quito

Asunción, Paraguay

May 2, 1970

Peñarol (Uruguay)	2 – 1	(Ecuador) LDU Quito

Montevideo, Uruguay

=== Zone 3 ===
Pos	Team	Pld	W	D	L	GF	GA	GD	Pts	Qualification	(Chile) UCH	(Uruguay) NAC
1	Universidad de Chile	2	1	0	1	3	2	+1	2	Qualified to the Third Phase		3–0
2	(Uruguay) Nacional	2	1	0	1	2	3	−1	2		2–0	

April 15, 1970

Universidad de Chile	3 – 0	(Uruguay) Nacional

Santiago, Chile

April 25, 1970

Nacional (Uruguay)	2 – 0	Universidad de Chile

Montevideo, Uruguay

April 28, 1970

Universidad de Chile	2 – 1	(Uruguay) Nacional

Porto Alegre, Brazil

== Third phase ==
=== Semi-final A ===
Pos	Team	Pld	W	D	L	GF	GA	GD	Pts	Qualification	(Uruguay) PEÑ	(Chile) UCH
1	(Uruguay) Peñarol	2	1	0	1	2	1	+1	2	Qualified to the Finals		2–0
2	Universidad de Chile	2	1	0	1	1	2	−1	2		1–0	

May 8, 1970

Universidad de Chile	1 – 0	(Uruguay) Peñarol

Santiago, Chile

May 12, 1970

Peñarol (Uruguay)	2 – 0	Universidad de Chile

Montevideo, Uruguay

May 14, 1970

Peñarol (Uruguay)	2 – 2	Universidad de Chile

Avellaneda, Argentina

=== Semi-final B ===
Pos	Team	Pld	W	D	L	GF	GA	GD	Pts	Qualification	(Argentina) EST	(Argentina) RIV
1	(Argentina) Estudiantes (LP)	2	2	0	0	4	1	+3	4	Qualified to the Finals		3–1
2	(Argentina) River Plate	2	0	0	2	1	4	−3	0		0–1	

May 7, 1970

River Plate (Argentina)	0 – 1	(Argentina) Estudiantes (LP)

Buenos Aires, Argentina

May 5, 1970

Estudiantes (LP) (Argentina)	3 – 1	(Argentina) River Plate

La Plata, Argentina

== Finals ==
May 21, 1970

Estudiantes (LP) (Argentina)	1 – 0	(Uruguay) Peñarol

La Plata, Argentina

May 27, 1970

Peñarol (Uruguay)	0 – 0	(Argentina) Estudiantes

Montevideo, Uruguay

== Champion ==
Copa Libertadores de América
1970 Champions

Estudiantes (LP)
Third Title
