= 1968 Copa Libertadores =

9th season of Copa Libertadores

1968 Copa Libertadores de América 1968 Copa Libertadores da América

Tournament details
- Dates: January 27 - May 16
- Teams: 21 (from 10 confederations)

Final positions
- Champions: (Argentina) Estudiantes (LP) (1st title)
- Runners-up: (Brazil) Palmeiras

Tournament statistics
- Matches played: 93
- Goals scored: 230 (2.47 per match)
- Top scorer: (Brazil) Tupãzinho (11 goals)

The 1968 Copa Libertadores was the ninth edition of the Copa Libertadores, South America's premier association football competition. It was played between January 27 and May 16. A record 21 teams participated in this edition.

This edition brought the debut of a team from the city of La Plata, capital of the Buenos Aires province, that did not find itself in the plateau of Argentine football. Estudiantes de La Plata, an authentic stranger in the highest levels of South American football, surpassed all expectations as they eliminated defending champions Racing and Independiente (two denominated "great" ones in Argentina as well as each having already won the tournament before).

With a talented prospect by the name of Juan Ramón Verón, the pincharatas beat Palmeiras 2–0 in a playoff after the final series finished 2–2 on points. Estudiantes conquered the title with an original style which emphasized athleticism and strategic preparation.

== Qualified teams ==
Country	Team	Qualification method
CONMEBOL; 1 berth	Racing	1967 Copa Libertadores de América winners
Argentina; 2 berths	Independiente	1967 Primera División champion
Argentina; 2 berths	Estudiantes (LP)	1967 Primera División runner-up
Bolivia; 2 berths	Jorge Wilstermann	1967 Torneo Nacional champion
Bolivia; 2 berths	Always Ready	1967 Torneo Nacional runner-up
Brazil; 2 berths	Palmeiras	1967 Taça Brasil champion
Brazil; 2 berths	Náutico	1967 Taça Brasil runner-up
Chile; 2 berths	Universidad de Chile	1967 Primera División champion
Chile; 2 berths	Universidad Católica	1967 Primera División runner-up
Colombia; 2 berths	Deportivo Cali	1967 Campeonato Profesional champion
Colombia; 2 berths	Millonarios	1967 Campeonato Profesional runner-up
Ecuador; 2 berths	El Nacional	1967 Campeonato Ecuatoriano de Fútbol Serie A champion
Ecuador; 2 berths	Emelec	1967 Campeonato Ecuatoriano de Fútbol Serie A runner-up
Paraguay; 2 berths	Guaraní	1967 Primera División champion
Paraguay; 2 berths	Libertad	1967 Primera División runner-up
Peru; 2 berths	Universitario	1967 Torneo Descentralizado champion
Peru; 2 berths	Sporting Cristal	1967 Torneo Descentralizado runner-up
Uruguay; 2 berths	Peñarol	1967 Primera División champion
Uruguay; 2 berths	Nacional	1967 Primera División runner-up
Venezuela; 2 berths	Deportivo Portugués	1967 Primera División Venezolana champion
Venezuela; 2 berths	Deportivo Galicia	1967 Primera División Venezolana runner-up

== Draw ==
The champions and runners-up of each football association were drawn into the same group along with another football association's participating teams. Three clubs from Argentina competed as Racing was champion of the 1967 Copa Libertadores. They entered the tournament in the semifinals.

Group 1	Group 2	Group 3	Group 4	Group 5
Argentina; Colombia	Bolivia; Peru	Chile; Ecuador	Paraguay; Uruguay	Brazil; Venezuela

== Tie-breaking criteria ==
At each stage of the tournament teams receive 2 points for a win, 1 point for a draw, and no points for a loss. If two or more teams were equal on points, the following criteria was to be applied to determine the ranking in the group stage:

1. a one-game playoff;
2. superior goal difference;
3. draw of lots.

== First round ==
Twenty teams were drawn into five groups of four. In each group, teams played against each other home-and-away. The top two teams in each group advanced to the Second round. Racing, the title holders, had a bye to the semifinals.

Key to colors in group tables
Group winners and runners-up advanced to the Second round

=== Group 1 ===
Pos	Team	Pld	W	D	L	GF	GA	GD	Pts	Qualification	(Argentina) EST	(Argentina) IND	(Colombia) CAL	(Colombia) MIL
1	(Argentina) Estudiantes (LP)	6	5	1	0	12	3	+9	11	Qualified to the Second Round		2–0	3–0	0–0
2	(Argentina) Independiente	6	2	1	3	8	10	−2	5	Qualified to the Second Round	2–4		1–1	3–1
3	(Colombia) Deportivo Cali	6	2	1	3	6	10	−4	5		1–2	1–0		1–0
4	(Colombia) Millonarios	6	1	1	4	6	9	−3	3		0–1	1–2	4–2	

January 27, 1968

Independiente (Argentina)	2 – 4	(Argentina) Estudiantes (LP)
Bernao; Artime		Ribaudo; Echecopar; Verón

Avellaneda

February 4, 1968

Millonarios (Colombia)	1 – 2	(Argentina) Independiente
Ferrero		Bernao; Artime

Bogotá

February 7, 1968

Millonarios (Colombia)	0 – 1	(Argentina) Estudiantes (LP)
		Flores

Bogotá

February 8, 1968

Deportivo Cali (Colombia)	1 – 0	(Argentina) Independiente
Iroldo

Cali

February 11, 1968

Deportivo Cali (Colombia)	1 – 2	(Argentina) Estudiantes (LP)
Manera o.g.'		Bilardo; Echecopar

Cali

February 14, 1968

Millonarios (Colombia)	4 – 2	(Colombia) Deportivo Cali
Ferrero; Aceros; Fernández; Frattini		Álvarez; Desiderio

Bogotá

February 17, 1968

Estudiantes (LP) (Argentina)	3 – 0	(Colombia) Deportivo Cali
Ribaudo; Verón; Echecopar

La Plata

February 18, 1968

Independiente (Argentina)	3 – 1	(Colombia) Millonarios
Artime		Rodríguez

Avellaneda

February 21, 1968

Estudiantes (LP) (Argentina)	0 – 0	(Colombia) Millonarios

La Plata

February 22, 1968

Independiente (Argentina)	1 – 1	(Colombia) Deportivo Cali
Savoy		Iroldo

Avellaneda

February 28, 1968

Deportivo Cali (Colombia)	1 – 0	(Colombia) Millonarios
Ferreira

Cali

February 29, 1968

Estudiantes (LP) (Argentina)	2 – 0	(Argentina) Independiente
Pachamé; Conigliaro

La Plata

March 6, 1968
Second
place playoff

Independiente (Argentina)	3 – 2	(Colombia) Deportivo Cali
Pastoriza; Bernao; Artime		Iroldo; Sánchez

Avellaneda

=== Group 2 ===
Pos	Team	Pld	W	D	L	GF	GA	GD	Pts	Qualification	(Peru) UNI	(Peru) CRI	(Bolivia) WIL	(Bolivia) ALW
1	(Peru) Universitario	6	3	3	0	17	4	+13	9	Qualified to the Second Round		1–1	5–1	6–0
2	(Peru) Sporting Cristal	6	3	3	0	11	5	+6	9	Qualified to the Second Round	2–2		2–0	1–1
3	(Bolivia) Jorge Wilstermann	6	2	1	3	5	8	−3	5		0–0	0–1		3–0
4	(Bolivia) Always Ready	6	0	1	5	2	18	−16	1		0–3	1–4	0–1	

January 24, 1968

Always Ready (Bolivia)	0 – 3	(Peru) Universitario
		Flores; Casaretto

La Paz

January 24, 1968

Jorge Wilstermann (Bolivia)	0 – 1	(Peru) Sporting Cristal
		Castillo

Cochabamba

January 28, 1968

Always Ready (Bolivia)	1 – 4	(Peru) Sporting Cristal
Villante		Pajuelo; Aquije; Castillo

La Paz

January 28, 1968

Jorge Wilstermann (Bolivia)	0 – 0	(Peru) Universitario

Cochabamba

February 4, 1968

Jorge Wilstermann (Bolivia)	3 – 0	(Bolivia) Always Ready
López; Cabrera

Cochabamba

February 15, 1968

Universitario (Peru)	1 – 1	(Peru) Sporting Cristal
Challe		Aquije

Lima

February 19, 1968

Sporting Cristal (Peru)	2 – 0	(Bolivia) Jorge Wilstermann
Risco; Castillo

Lima

February 22, 1968

Universitario (Peru)	5 – 1	(Bolivia) Jorge Wilstermann
Rojas; Flores		López

Lima

February 24, 1968

Sporting Cristal (Peru)	1 – 1	(Bolivia) Always Ready
Gallardo		Morales

Lima

February 27, 1968

Universitario (Peru)	6 – 0	(Bolivia) Always Ready
Flores; Lobatón; Rojas; Staukas o.g.'

Lima

March 2, 1968

Sporting Cristal (Peru)	2 – 2	(Peru) Universitario
Aquije; Gallardo		Calatayud; Challe

Lima

March 3, 1968

Always Ready (Bolivia)	0 – 1^{[A]}	(Bolivia) Jorge Wilstermann
		Cabrera

La Paz

=== Group 3 ===
Pos	Team	Pld	W	D	L	GF	GA	GD	Pts	Qualification	(Chile) CAT	(Ecuador) EME	(Ecuador) NAC	(Chile) UCH
1	(Chile) Universidad Católica	6	4	1	1	11	7	+4	9	Qualified to the Second Round		1–1	2–0	3–2
2	(Ecuador) Emelec	6	2	3	1	5	4	+1	7	Qualified to the Second Round	1–2		0–0	2–1
3	(Ecuador) El Nacional	6	2	1	3	5	6	−1	5		2–1	0–1		3–1
4	Universidad de Chile	6	1	1	4	6	10	−4	3		1–2	0–0	1–0	

February 4, 1968

Emelec (Ecuador)	0 – 0	(Ecuador) El Nacional

Guayaquil

February 11, 1968

El Nacional (Ecuador)	2 – 1	(Chile) Universidad Católica
Rodríguez		Sarnari

Quito

February 11, 1968

Emelec (Ecuador)	2 – 1	Universidad de Chile
Mena; Hernández		Gangas

Guayaquil

February 18, 1968

Emelec (Ecuador)	1 – 2	(Chile) Universidad Católica
Echeverría		Isella; Gallardo

Guayaquil

February 18, 1968

El Nacional (Ecuador)	3 – 1	Universidad de Chile
Correa; Rodríguez; Rangel		Marcos

Quito

February 21, 1968

Universidad Católica (Chile)	3 – 2	Universidad de Chile
Sarnari; Gallardo		Oleniak; Yávar

Santiago

February 24, 1968

Universidad Católica (Chile)	2 – 0	(Ecuador) El Nacional
Isella; Varas

Santiago

February 24, 1968

Universidad de Chile	0 – 0	(Ecuador) Emelec

Santiago

February 27, 1968

Universidad Católica (Chile)	1 – 1	(Ecuador) Emelec
Sarnari		Sosa

Santiago

February 27, 1968

Universidad de Chile	1 – 0	(Ecuador) El Nacional
Campos

Santiago

March 2, 1968

Universidad de Chile	1 – 2	(Chile) Universidad Católica
Yávar		Messén

Santiago

March 3, 1968

El Nacional (Ecuador)	0 – 1	(Ecuador) Emelec
		Mena

Guayaquil

=== Group 4 ===
Pos	Team	Pld	W	D	L	GF	GA	GD	Pts	Qualification	(Uruguay) PEÑ	(Paraguay) GUA	(Uruguay) NAC	(Paraguay) LIB
1	(Uruguay) Peñarol	6	3	2	1	8	2	+6	8	Qualified to the Second Round		2–0	1–0	4–0
2	(Paraguay) Guaraní	6	2	3	1	8	7	+1	7	Qualified to the Second Round	1–1		2–1	2–0
3	(Uruguay) Nacional	6	2	2	2	9	5	+4	6		0–0	2–2		4–0
4	(Paraguay) Libertad	6	1	1	4	2	13	−11	3		1–0	1–1	0–2	

February 2, 1968

Peñarol (Uruguay)	1 – 0	(Uruguay) Nacional
Spencer

Montevideo

February 2, 1968

Guaraní (Paraguay)	2 – 0	(Paraguay) Libertad
V. Juárez; Martínez

Asunción

February 6, 1968

Nacional (Uruguay)	2 – 2	(Paraguay) Guaraní
Techera; Mújica		García

Montevideo

February 7, 1968

Peñarol (Uruguay)	4 – 0	(Paraguay) Libertad
Spencer; Rocha; Bertocchi

Montevideo

February 10, 1968

Nacional (Uruguay)	4 – 0	(Paraguay) Libertad
Morales; Mújica; Célio

Montevideo

February 12, 1968

Peñarol (Uruguay)	2 – 0	(Paraguay) Guaraní
Spencer

Montevideo

February 16, 1968

Libertad (Paraguay)	1 – 1	(Paraguay) Guaraní
Ayala		V. Juárez

Asunción

February 16, 1968

Nacional (Uruguay)	0 – 0	(Uruguay) Peñarol

Montevideo

February 20, 1968

Libertad (Paraguay)	1 – 0	(Uruguay) Peñarol
Fleitas

Asunción

February 21, 1968

Guaraní (Paraguay)	2 – 1	(Uruguay) Nacional
Ivaldi; Martínez		Célio

Asunción

February 24, 1968

Guaraní (Paraguay)	1 – 1	(Uruguay) Peñarol
V. Juárez		Abbadie

Asunción

February 25, 1968

Libertad (Paraguay)	0 – 2	(Uruguay) Nacional
		Célio; Virgili

Asunción

=== Group 5 ===
Pos	Team	Pld	W	D	L	GF	GA	GD	Pts	Qualification	(Brazil) PAL	(Venezuela) POR	(Brazil) NAU	(Venezuela) GAL
1	(Brazil) Palmeiras	6	5	1	0	12	3	+9	11	Qualified to the Second Round		3–0	0–0	2–0
2	(Venezuela) Deportivo Portugués	6	2	1	3	5	11	−6	5	Qualified to the Second Round	1–2		1–1	1–0
3	(Brazil) Náutico	6	1	2	3	7	8	−1	4		1–3	3–2^{[B]}		1–0
4	(Venezuela) Deportivo Galicia	6	2	0	4	5	7	−2	4		1–2	2–0	2–1	

January 21, 1968

Deportivo Galicia (Venezuela)	2 – 0	(Venezuela) Deportivo Portugués
Celso

Acarigua

January 21, 1968

Náutico (Brazil)	1 – 3	(Brazil) Palmeiras
Ladeira		Ademir; Tupãzinho

Recife

January 27, 1968

Deportivo Portugués (Venezuela)	1 – 1	(Brazil) Náutico
Ramos		Ivan

Caracas

January 31, 1968

Deportivo Galicia (Venezuela)	2 – 1	(Brazil) Náutico
Becerra; Olavo		Lala

Acarigua

February 4, 1968

Deportivo Galicia (Venezuela)	1 – 2	(Brazil) Palmeiras
Chacho		Ademir; Díaz o.g.'

Acarigua

February 7, 1968

Deportivo Portugués (Venezuela)	1 – 2	(Brazil) Palmeiras
Ramos		Tupãzinho; Pantera

Caracas

February 11, 1968

Náutico (Brazil)	1 – 0	(Venezuela) Deportivo Galicia
Nino

Recife

February 14, 1968

Náutico (Brazil)	3 – 2 ^{[B]}	(Venezuela) Deportivo Portugués
Lala; Ladeira; Nino		Ratto; Ramos

Recife

February 18, 1968

Palmeiras (Brazil)	2 – 0	(Venezuela) Deportivo Galicia
Servílio; Tupãzinho

São Paulo

February 22, 1968

Palmeiras (Brazil)	3 – 0	(Venezuela) Deportivo Portugués
Servílio; Ademir

São Paulo

March 3, 1968

Palmeiras (Brazil)	0 – 0	(Brazil) Náutico

São Paulo

March 3, 1968

Deportivo Portugués (Venezuela)	1 – 0	(Venezuela) Deportivo Galicia
Ratto

Caracas

== Second round ==
Ten teams were drawn into three groups, two groups of three and one group of four. In each group, teams played against each other home-and-away. The top team in each group advanced to the Semifinals, along with Racing.

=== Group A ===
Pos	Team	Pld	W	D	L	GF	GA	GD	Pts	Qualification	(Argentina) EST	(Argentina) IND	(Peru) UNI
1	(Argentina) Estudiantes	4	3	0	1	4	2	+2	6	Qualified to the Semifinals		1–0	1–0
2	(Argentina) Independiente	4	2	0	2	7	3	+4	4		1–2		3–0
3	(Peru) Universitario	4	1	0	3	1	7	−6	2		1–0	0–3	

March 16, 1968

Universitario (Peru)	1 – 0	(Argentina) Estudiantes
Lobatón

Lima

March 21, 1968

Universitario (Peru)	0 – 3	(Argentina) Independiente
		Pastoriza

Lima

March 28, 1968

Independiente (Argentina)	1 – 2	(Argentina) Estudiantes
Pavoni		Ribaudo

Avellaneda

April 4, 1968

Estudiantes (Argentina)	1 – 0	(Argentina) Independiente
Flores

La Plata

April 9, 1968

Estudiantes (Argentina)	1 – 0	(Peru) Universitario
Verón

La Plata

April 11, 1968

Independiente (Argentina)	3 – 0	(Peru) Universitario
Yazalde; Tarabini; Artime

Avellaneda

=== Group B ===
Pos	Team	Pld	W	D	L	GF	GA	GD	Pts	Qualification	(Uruguay) PEÑ	(Peru) CRI	(Ecuador) EME	(Venezuela) POR
1	(Uruguay) Peñarol	6	4	2	0	10	1	+9	10	Qualified to the Semifinals		1–1	1–0	4–0
2	(Peru) Sporting Cristal	6	2	4	0	7	3	+4	8		0–0		1–1	2–0
3	(Ecuador) Emelec	6	1	1	4	3	7	−4	3		0–1	0–2		2–0
4	(Venezuela) Deportivo Portugués	6	1	1	4	3	12	−9	3		0–3	1–1	2–0	

March 16, 1968

Deportivo Portugués (Venezuela)	0 – 3	(Uruguay) Peñarol
		Silva; Méndez; Spencer

Caracas

March 17, 1968

Emelec (Ecuador)	0 – 2	(Peru) Sporting Cristal
		Mifflin; Aquije

Guayaquil

March 20, 1968

Emelec (Ecuador)	0 – 1	(Uruguay) Peñarol
		Spencer

Guayaquil

March 20, 1968

Deportivo Portugués (Venezuela)	1 – 1	(Peru) Sporting Cristal
Curro		Pajuelo

Caracas

March 24, 1968

Emelec (Ecuador)	2 – 0	(Venezuela) Deportivo Portugués
Sosa

Guayaquil

March 25, 1968

Sporting Cristal (Peru)	0 – 0	(Uruguay) Peñarol

Lima

March 28, 1968

Sporting Cristal (Peru)	2 – 0	(Venezuela) Deportivo Portugués
Gallardo

Lima

March 31, 1968

Peñarol (Uruguay)	4 – 0	(Venezuela) Deportivo Portugués
Spencer; Abbadie; Bertocchi

Montevideo

April 1, 1968

Sporting Cristal (Peru)	1 – 1	(Ecuador) Emelec
Gallardo		Echeverría

Lima

April 4, 1968

Peñarol (Uruguay)	1 – 0	(Ecuador) Emelec
Cortés

Montevideo

April 10, 1968

Peñarol (Uruguay)	1 – 1	(Peru) Sporting Cristal
Spencer		Risco

Montevideo

April 10, 1968

Deportivo Portugués (Venezuela)	2 – 0	(Ecuador) Emelec
Ramos

Caracas

=== Group C ===
Pos	Team	Pld	W	D	L	GF	GA	GD	Pts	Qualification	(Brazil) PAL	(Paraguay) GUA	(Chile) CAT
1	(Brazil) Palmeiras	4	3	0	1	7	4	+3	6	Qualified to the Semifinals		2–1	4–1
2	(Paraguay) Guaraní	4	2	0	2	7	7	0	4		2–0		3–1
3	(Chile) Universidad Católica	4	1	0	3	6	9	−3	2		0–1	4–1	

March 13, 1968

Universidad Católica (Chile)	4 – 1	(Paraguay) Guaraní
Sarnari; Isella		García

Santiago

March 17, 1968

Guaraní (Paraguay)	3 – 1	(Chile) Universidad Católica
V. Juárez; Sosa; García		Varas

Asunción

March 21, 1968

Palmeiras (Brazil)	4 – 1	(Chile) Universidad Católica
Tupãzinho; Pantera; Rinaldo		Varas

São Paulo

March 24, 1968

Guaraní (Paraguay)	2 – 0	(Brazil) Palmeiras
V. Juárez; Martínez

Asunción

March 31, 1968

Universidad Católica (Chile)	0 – 1	(Brazil) Palmeiras
		Dudú

Santiago

April 4, 1968

Palmeiras (Brazil)	2 – 1	(Paraguay) Guaraní
Tupãzinho; Servílio		E. Juárez

São Paulo

== Semifinals ==
Four teams were drawn into two groups. In each group, teams played against each other home-and-away. The top team in each group advanced to the Finals.

=== Semifinal 1 ===
Pos	Team	Pld	W	D	L	GF	GA	GD	Pts	Qualification	(Argentina) EST	(Argentina) RAC
1	(Argentina) Estudiantes (LP)	3	1	1	1	4	3	+1	3	Qualified to the Finals		3–0
2	(Argentina) Racing	3	1	1	1	3	4	−1	3		2–0	

April 18, 1968

Estudiantes (LP) (Argentina)	3–0	(Argentina) Racing
Verón; Perfumo

La Plata

April 24, 1968

Racing (Argentina)	2–0	(Argentina) Estudiantes (LP)
Maschio; Fucceneco

Avellaneda

April 27, 1968
Playoff

Racing (Argentina)	1–1	(Argentina) Estudiantes
Cárdenas		Verón

Buenos Aires

Estudiantes progressed to the finals due to better goal difference.

=== Semifinal 2 ===
Pos	Team	Pld	W	D	L	GF	GA	GD	Pts	Qualification	(Brazil) PAL	(Uruguay) PEÑ
1	(Brazil) Palmeiras	2	2	0	0	3	1	+2	4	Qualified to the Finals		1–0
2	(Uruguay) Peñarol	2	0	0	2	1	3	−2	0		1–2	

April 18, 1968

Palmeiras (Brazil)	1 – 0	(Uruguay) Peñarol
Tupãzinho

São Paulo

April 23, 1968

Peñarol (Uruguay)	1 – 2	(Brazil) Palmeiras
Silva		Tupãzinho

Montevideo

== Finals ==
Pos	Team	Pld	W	D	L	GF	GA	GD	Pts	Qualification	(Argentina) EST	(Brazil) PAL
1	(Argentina) Estudiantes (LP)	3	2	0	1	5	4	+1	4	Champions		2–1
2	(Brazil) Palmeiras	3	1	0	2	4	5	−1	2		3–1	

May 2, 1968

Estudiantes (LP) (Argentina)	2–1	(Brazil) Palmeiras
Verón 83'; Bocha 87'		Servilio 30'

Estadio Jorge Luis Hirschi,
La Plata
Attendance: 35,000
Referee: Esteban Marino (Uruguay)

May 7, 1968

Palmeiras (Brazil)	3–1	(Argentina) Estudiantes (LP)
Tupãzinho 10', 68'; Rinaldo 54'		Verón 72'

Estádio do Pacaembu,
São Paulo
Attendance: 40,000
Referee: Domingo Massaro (Chile)

May 16, 1968
Playoff

Palmeiras (Brazil)	0–2	(Argentina) Estudiantes (LP)
		Ribaudo 13'; Verón 82'

Estadio Centenario,
Montevideo
Attendance: 55,000
Referee: César Orozco (Peru)

== Champion ==
Copa Libertadores de América
1968 Winners

Estudiantes (LP)
First Title

== Top goalscorers ==
Pos	Player	Team	Goals
1	(Brazil) Tupãzinho	(Brazil) Palmeiras	11
2	(Ecuador) Alberto Spencer	(Uruguay) Peñarol	10
3	(Argentina) Juan Ramón Verón	(Argentina) Estudiantes	9
4	(Argentina) Luis Artime	(Argentina) Independiente	6
5	(Argentina) Felipe Ribaudo	(Argentina) Estudiantes	6
6	(Paraguay) Víctor Domingo Juárez	(Paraguay) Guaraní	6
6	(Peru) Daniel Flores	(Peru) Universitario	6
6	(Argentina) Juan Carlos Sarnari	(Chile) Universidad Católica	6
9	(Brazil) Servílio	(Brazil) Palmeiras	5
9	(Peru) Alberto Gallardo	(Peru) Sporting Cristal	5

== Footnotes ==
A. The match finished 1-1, but Jorge Wilstermann were declared 0-1 winners after Troncoso's own goal was declared invalid.
B. The match finished 3-2, but the 2 points were awarded to Deportivo Portugués as Náutico made two substitutions.
