= 1967 Campeonato Brasileiro Série A (Taça Brasil) =

Football tournament edition

Campeonato Brasileiro Série A
- Season: 1967
- Champions: Palmeiras (3rd title)
- Copa Libertadores de América: Palmeiras; Náutico
- Matches: 61
- Goals: 168 (2.75 per match)
- Top goalscorer: Chicletes (9 goals)

The 1967 Campeonato Brasileiro Série A (officially the 1967 Taça Brasil) was the 11th edition of the Campeonato Brasileiro Série A. Palmeiras won the championship, the 3rd national title of the club in 8 years of tournament contention.

== Northern Zone ==
=== Northern Group ===
Pos	Team	Pld	W	D	L	GF	GA	GD	Pts
1	(Pará) Paysandu	4	3	0	1	9	7	+2	6
2	Piauí	4	1	1	2	4	4	0	3
3	(Maranhão) Moto Club	4	1	1	2	4	6	−2	3

==== Northern Group Finals ====
Teams			Scores		Tie-breaker	
Team 1	Points	Team 2	1st leg	2nd leg	3rd leg	GD
América (Ceará)	4:0	(Pará) Paysandu	1:0	1:0	–	–

=== Northeastern Group ===
Pos	Team	Pld	W	D	L	GF	GA	GD	Pts
1	(Paraíba) Treze	6	3	3	0	11	6	+5	9
2	(Alagoas) CSA	6	2	3	1	11	9	+2	7
3	(Sergipe) América	6	1	2	3	8	10	−2	4
4	(Rio Grande do Norte) ABC	6	1	2	3	7	12	−5	4

==== Northeastern Group Finals ====
Teams			Scores		Tie-breaker	
Team 1	Points	Team 2	1st leg	2nd leg	3rd leg	GD
Leônico (Bahia)	0:4	(Paraíba) Treze	1:2	1:2	–	–

=== Northern Zone Decision ===
Teams			Scores		Tie-breaker	
Team 1	Points	Team 2	1st leg	2nd leg	3rd leg	GD
Northern Zone Semifinals
América (Ceará)	3:1	(Paraíba) Treze	2:0	1:1	–	—
Northern Zone Finals
América (Ceará)	0:4	(Pernambuco) Náutico	0:1	0:1	—	—

== Central Zone ==
Pos	Team	Pld	W	D	L	GF	GA	GD	Pts
1	(Rio de Janeiro (state)) Goytacaz	6	3	2	1	10	8	+2	8
2	(Espírito Santo) Rio Branco	6	3	1	2	8	3	+5	7
3	Goiás	6	1	4	1	4	4	0	6
4	(Federal District (Brazil)) Rabello	6	1	1	4	3	10	−7	3

=== Central Zone Decision ===
Teams			Scores		Tie-breaker	
Team 1	Points	Team 2	1st leg	2nd leg	3rd leg	GD
Northern Zone Semifinals
Goytacaz (Rio de Janeiro (state))	0:4	(Minas Gerais) Atlético	1:2	1:5	–	—
Northern Zone Finals
Botafogo (Guanabara (state))	2:2	(Minas Gerais) Atlético	3:2	0:1	1:1	—

== Southern Zone ==
Pos	Team	Pld	W	D	L	GF	GA	GD	Pts
1	(Rio Grande do Sul) Grêmio	4	2	2	0	12	2	+10	6
2	(Paraná (state)) Ferroviário	4	2	1	1	6	6	0	5
3	(Santa Catarina (state)) Perdigão	4	0	1	3	6	16	−10	1

== Quarterfinals ==
Teams			Scores			
Team 1	Points	Team 2	1st leg	2nd leg	3rd leg	Agg.
Náutico (Pernambuco)	2:2	(Minas Gerais) Atlético	3:0	0:2	2:2	5:4

== Semifinals ==
Cruzeiro and Palmeiras enter in this stage

Teams			Scores		Tie-breaker	
Team 1	Points	Team 2	1st leg	2nd leg	3rd leg	GD
Cruzeiro (Minas Gerais)	2:2	(Pernambuco) Náutico	2:1	0:3	0:0	2:4
Grêmio (Rio Grande do Sul)	2:2	(São Paulo (state)) Palmeiras	2:1	1:3	1:2	—

== Final ==
20 December 1967

Náutico	1–3	Palmeiras
Nino 17'		César Maluco 23'; Zequinha 37'; Lula 46'

Ilha do Retiro, Recife
Attendance: 20,000
Referee: Arnaldo Cézar Coelho

27 December 1967

Palmeiras	1–2	Náutico
Tupãzinho 81'		Ladeira 17'; Nino 43'

Pacaembu, São Paulo
Attendance: 28,000
Referee: Arnaldo Cézar Coelho

29 December 1967

Palmeiras	2–0	Náutico
César Maluco 7'; Ademir da Guia 79'

Maracanã, Rio de Janeiro
Attendance: 16,577
Referee: Armando Marques

Campeonato Brasileiro Série A
1967 champions

3rd title
