= 1967 São Paulo FC season =

São Paulo
1967 season
- Chairman: Laudo Natel
- Manager: Sylvio Pirillo
- Torneio Roberto Gomes Pedrosa: First stage
- Campeonato Paulista: Runners-up

The 1967 football season was São Paulo's 38th season since club's existence.

== Overall ==
Games played	52 (14 Torneio Roberto Gomes Pedrosa, 27 Campeonato Paulista, 11 Friendly match)
Games won	25 (3 Torneio Roberto Gomes Pedrosa, 16 Campeonato Paulista, 6 Friendly match)
Games drawn	20 (7 Torneio Roberto Gomes Pedrosa, 9 Campeonato Paulista, 4 Friendly match)
Games lost	7 (4 Torneio Roberto Gomes Pedrosa, 2 Campeonato Paulista, 1 Friendly match)
Goals scored	93
Goals conceded	44
Goal difference	+49
Best result	6–0 (H) v Botafogo - Campeonato Paulista - 1967.11.04
Worst result	1–4 (A) v Racing - Friendly match - 1967.02.20
Most appearances	
Top scorer	

Source: São Paulo FC

== Friendlies ==
January 21 National	São Paulo	1–2	Cruzeiro	São Paulo
	Goal		Goal	Stadium: Estádio Cícero Pompeu de Toledo (Morumbi)

February 20 International	Racing (Argentina)	4–1	(Brazil) São Paulo	Buenos Aires
	Goal		Goal

February 28 International	Atlanta (Argentina)	1–2	(Brazil) São Paulo	Buenos Aires
	Goal		Goal

June 11 National	Juventus	1–3	São Paulo	São Paulo
	Goal		Goal	Stadium: Estádio Conde Rodolfo Crespi (Rua Javari)

June 18 National	Comercial	3–1	São Paulo	Ribeirão Preto
	Goal		Goal	Stadium: Estádio Doutor Francisco de Palma Travassos

June 22 National	Portuguesa Santista	1–4	São Paulo	Santos
	Goal		Goal	Stadium: Estádio Ulrico Mursa

July 26 National	São José	2–1	São Paulo	São José dos Campos
	Goal		Goal

September 23 National	Serra Negra XI	0–2	São Paulo	Serra Negra
			Goal

October 4 National	São Paulo	1–0	XV de Piracicaba	São Paulo
	Goal			Stadium: Estádio Municipal Paulo Machado de Carvalho (Pacaembu)

=== Torneo Quadrangular de Temuco ===
March 3 International	Green Cross (Chile)	0–4	(Brazil) São Paulo	Temuco
			Goal	Stadium: Estadio Municipal Germán Becker

March 5 International	Universidad de Chile	0–0	(Brazil) São Paulo	Temuco
				Stadium: Estadio Municipal Germán Becker

March 7 International	Newell's Old Boys (Argentina)	0–3	(Brazil) São Paulo	Temuco
			Goal	Stadium: Estadio Municipal Germán Becker

== Official competitions ==
=== Torneio Roberto Gomes Pedrosa ===
March 12 First stage 1	Bangu	2–1	São Paulo	Rio de Janeiro
	Goal		Goal	Stadium: Estádio Jornalista Mário Filho (Maracanã)

March 19 First stage 2	São Paulo	1–1	Botafogo	São Paulo
	Goal		Goal	Stadium: Estádio Municipal Paulo Machado de Carvalho (Pacaembu)

March 22 First stage 3	Internacional	1–0	São Paulo	Porto Alegre
	Goal			Stadium: Estádio Olímpico Monumental

March 26 First stage 4	São Paulo	1–2	Fluminense	São Paulo
	Goal		Goal	Stadium: Estádio Municipal Paulo Machado de Carvalho (Pacaembu)

April 1 First stage 5	Santos	1–1	São Paulo	São Paulo
	Goal		Goal	Stadium: Estádio Municipal Paulo Machado de Carvalho (Pacaembu)

April 9 First stage 6	Flamengo	2–2	São Paulo	Rio de Janeiro
	Goal		Goal	Stadium: Estádio Jornalista Mário Filho (Maracanã)

April 16 First stage 7	Grêmio	1–1	São Paulo	Porto Alegre
	Goal		Goal	Stadium: Estádio Olímpico Monumental

April 19 First stage 8	São Paulo	4–0	Ferroviário	São Paulo
	Goal			Stadium: Estádio Municipal Paulo Machado de Carvalho (Pacaembu)

April 22 First stage 9	Corinthians	1–0	São Paulo	São Paulo
	Goal			Stadium: Estádio Municipal Paulo Machado de Carvalho (Pacaembu)

April 26 First stage 10	Portuguesa	1–1	São Paulo	São Paulo
	Goal		Goal	Stadium: Estádio Cícero Pompeu de Toledo (Morumbi)

April 30 First stage 11	Cruzeiro	0–2	São Paulo	Belo Horizonte
			Goal	Stadium: Estádio Governador Magalhães Pinto (Mineirão)

May 3 First stage 12	Atlético Mineiro	0–3	São Paulo	Belo Horizonte
			Goal	Stadium: Estádio Governador Magalhães Pinto (Mineirão)

May 6 First stage 13	Palmeiras	1–1	São Paulo	São Paulo
	Goal		Goal	Stadium: Estádio Municipal Paulo Machado de Carvalho (Pacaembu)

May 14 First stage 14	São Paulo	0–0	Vasco da Gama	São Paulo
				Stadium: Estádio Municipal Paulo Machado de Carvalho (Pacaembu)

==== Record ====
Final Position	Points	Matches	Wins	Draws	Losses	Goals For	Goals Away	Win%
10th	13	14	3	7	4	18	13	46%

=== Campeonato Paulista ===
July 5 1	São Paulo	2–0	Guarani	São Paulo
	Goal			Stadium: Estádio Municipal Paulo Machado de Carvalho (Pacaembu)

July 9 2	Prudentina	0–1	São Paulo	Presidente Prudente
			Goal	Stadium: Estádio Félix Ribeiro Marcondes

July 16 3	São Paulo	1–1	Ferroviária	São Paulo
	Goal		Goal	Stadium: Estádio Cícero Pompeu de Toledo (Morumbi)

July 21 4	São Paulo	3–1	Portuguesa	São Paulo
	Goal		Goal	Stadium: Estádio Municipal Paulo Machado de Carvalho (Pacaembu)

July 30 5	Botafogo	0–3	São Paulo	Ribeirão Preto
			Goal	Stadium: Estádio Luís Pereira (Vila Tibério)

August 5 6	São Paulo	5–0	Comercial	São Paulo
	Goal			Stadium: Estádio Cícero Pompeu de Toledo (Morumbi)

August 13 7	Corinthians	3–3	São Paulo	São Paulo
	Goal		Goal	Stadium: Estádio Cícero Pompeu de Toledo (Morumbi)

August 16 8	Santos	0–0	São Paulo	Santos
				Stadium: Estádio Urbano Caldeira (Vila Belmiro)

August 20 9	Juventus	0–2	São Paulo	São Paulo
			Goal	Stadium: Estádio Conde Rodolfo Crespi (Rua Javari)

August 27 10	São Paulo	1–1	Palmeiras	São Paulo
	Goal		Goal	Stadium: Estádio Cícero Pompeu de Toledo (Morumbi)

September 3 11	São Paulo	1–0	São Bento	São Paulo
	Goal			Stadium: Estádio Cícero Pompeu de Toledo (Morumbi)

September 7 12	Portuguesa Santista	0–0	São Paulo	Santos
				Stadium: Estádio Ulrico Mursa

September 10 13	América	0–2	São Paulo	São José do Rio Preto
			Goal	Stadium: Estádio Mário Alves de Mendonça

September 16 14	São Paulo	4–0	Prudentina	São Paulo
	Goal			Stadium: Estádio Cícero Pompeu de Toledo (Morumbi)

October 8 15	Ferroviária	1–0	São Paulo	Araraquara
	Goal			Stadium: Estádio Doutor Adhemar de Barros (Fonte Luminosa)

October 15 16	São Paulo	2–2	Santos	São Paulo
	Goal		Goal	Stadium: Estádio Cícero Pompeu de Toledo (Morumbi)

October 22 17	São Paulo	2–1	Portuguesa	São Paulo
	Goal		Goal	Stadium: Estádio Cícero Pompeu de Toledo (Morumbi)

October 29 18	São Bento	0–0	São Paulo	Sorocaba
				Stadium: Estádio Humberto Reale

November 4 19	São Paulo	6–0	Botafogo	São Paulo
	Goal			Stadium: Estádio Cícero Pompeu de Toledo (Morumbi)

November 12 20	São Paulo	1–0	Portuguesa Santista	São Paulo
	Goal			Stadium: Estádio Cícero Pompeu de Toledo (Morumbi)

November 15 21	São Paulo	2–1	Juventus	São Paulo
	Goal		Goal	Stadium: Estádio Cícero Pompeu de Toledo (Morumbi)

November 19 22	Comercial	2–3	São Paulo	Ribeirão Preto
	Goal		Goal	Stadium: Estádio Doutor Francisco de Palma Travassos

November 26 23	São Paulo	6–1	América	São Paulo
	Goal		Goal	Stadium: Estádio Cícero Pompeu de Toledo (Morumbi)

December 3 24	Palmeiras	0–0	São Paulo	São Paulo
				Stadium: Estádio Palestra Itália (Parque Antarctica)

December 10 25	Guarani	0–2	São Paulo	Campinas
			Goal	Stadium: Estádio Brinco de Ouro da Princesa

December 17 26	São Paulo	1–1	Corinthians	São Paulo
	Goal		Goal	Stadium: Estádio Municipal Paulo Machado de Carvalho (Pacaembu)

December 21 Final	Santos	2–1	São Paulo	São Paulo
	Goal		Goal	Stadium: Estádio Municipal Paulo Machado de Carvalho (Pacaembu)

==== Record ====
Final Position	Points	Matches	Wins	Draws	Losses	Goals For	Goals Away	Win%
2nd	41	27	16	9	2	54	17	76%
