= Apertura and Clausura =

Split season format for Spanish-speaking sports leagues

Apertura and Clausura seasons that occur across two calendar years; second half of one year and first half of the next Apertura and Clausura seasons that occur within a calendar year Apertura and Clausura that are only parts of a larger tournament

The Apertura ([apeɾˈtuɾa]) and Clausura ([klawˈsuɾa]) tournaments are a split season format for Spanish-speaking sports leagues. It is a relatively recent innovation for many Latin American football leagues in which the traditional association football season from August to May is divided into two sections per season, each with its own champion. Apertura and Clausura are the Spanish words for "opening" and "closing". In French-speaking Haiti, these are known as the Ouverture and the Fermeture, while in English-speaking Belize, they are respectively the Opening and Closing seasons. When used in the United States and Canada, they are known as the Spring Championship and Fall Championship (French: Championnat de printemps; Championnat d'automne).

== The Americas ==
The Apertura is held in the first half of the calendar year in Bolivia, Colombia, Haiti, Paraguay and Uruguay while it is held in the second half of the calendar year in Costa Rica, El Salvador, Guatemala, Honduras, Mexico and Nicaragua. The words Apertura and Clausura are used in most Latin American countries. Some use different terminology:

- Colombia: Apertura and Finalización
- Costa Rica: Invierno and Verano (Spanish for "winter" and "summer"); until the 2016–17 season.

In most leagues, each tournament constitutes a national championship in itself. On the other hand, in the leagues of Nicaragua, Peru, and Uruguay, the winners of the Apertura and Clausura play each other in a playoff for the season title, or there is a final stage where teams qualify based on placements in the Apertura and Clausura. Thus, two championship titles are awarded per year in the first group of leagues, and only one in the second. In Mexico and Colombia, for instance, the winners of each tournament play each other at the beginning of the following season for another title, but this is a rather minor season curtain-raiser, akin to national Super Cups in European leagues. Some Apertura and Clausura tournaments also have second stages to decide the winner.

In leagues with 12 or fewer teams, each Apertura and Clausura has a double round-robin format, as a means to fill in the gaps caused by the lack of elimination cup competitions as in most European countries. In leagues with 16 or more teams, each tournament has a single round-robin format. Relegations, if any, are done on an aggregate basis; usually the combined table for both tournaments determines relegation placements. In some leagues, the average points over the previous two or three seasons are used to determine relegation.

Peru abolished its Apertura and Clausura format after the 2008 season but brought it back for the 2014 season. Ecuador adopted the Apertura and Clausura in 2005 featuring two champions in the season, however, its subsequent tournaments renamed the Apertura and Clausura as first and second stages, respectively, with the top placed teams advancing to a third stage to determine the champion and international qualification. Starting in 2009, the Ecuadorian championships were decided by a final between stage or group winners, maintaining the half-year tournament format.

=== Argentina ===
- Argentina: Starting in 2012–13, Inicial and Final (Spanish for "initial" and "final").

Argentine Football Association (AFA) president Julio Grondona proposed in December 2008 the return to a single championship per season format, and at the conclusion of the 2014 Primera season this happened, with the 2015 season taking a European style year long season from February to December. The AFA later decided to change its season to one spanning two calendar years; as such, the 2016 season is an abbreviated tournament held from February to May, followed by an August-to-June season from 2016–17 forward.

=== Belize ===
The Premier League of Belize, created in 2012 by the merger of two rival top-level leagues, began a split season in 2012–13. The Opening Season takes place in the second half of the calendar year, with the Closing Season following in the first half of the next calendar year. Like most Latin American leagues, it crowns two separate champions in each season. However, its format is significantly different from that of most other leagues, being more similar to the system used by Major League Soccer in the United States and Canada.

In the first split season (2012–13), the league's 12 teams were divided into two six-team zones. During the first half of the season, every team played a double round-robin within its zone, plus single games against four teams from the opposite zone, resulting in a 14-game schedule. The top two teams from each zone qualified for a playoff round, with the top team from each zone matched against the second-place team from the other zone in the two-legged semifinals. The semifinal winners advanced to a two-legged final. In the second half of the season, only eight of the initial 12 teams competed; all teams played a double round-robin in that half of the season, followed by a four-team knockout playoff (again two-legged throughout). The number of teams participating in the top flight dropped to seven for the 2013–14 season. Each half of that season will have the same format as the 2013 Closing Season.

=== Brazil ===
The Brazilian national league is a notable tournament in Latin America not to split the season into two parts, using a single-season double round-robin format to decide the champions, similar to those in European leagues, though played between May and December. Brazilian clubs also participate in the state leagues from January to April, some of which do feature a split season format. Brazil also has, unlike most Latin American nations, a national cup. In 1967 and 1968, the Taça Brasil and Torneio Roberto Gomes Pedrosa were run in the same year, making these years de facto Apertura and Clausura seasons. Both tournaments' winners are recognized as Brazilian champions.

=== Canada ===
For the 2019 season only, the Canadian Premier League adopted a split-season format divided into Spring and Fall seasons. The winner of each part of the season advances to the Canadian Premier League Finals. Following the traditional standard for soccer in the United States and Canada, the season is entirely contained within a calendar year, running April to November. The CPL did not follow a simple double round-robin format; the spring season was an uneven 10 match season, while the fall season was a triple round robin, 18 match season.

=== United States ===
The second incarnation of the North American Soccer League adopted a split-season format in 2013, divided into Spring and Fall Championships. Like other soccer leagues in the United States and Canada, the season was entirely contained within a calendar year. Beginning in 2014, the winner of each season qualified for the playoffs along with the two teams with the best records in the combined seasons; the two season winners previously qualified directly for the Soccer Bowl championship. The seasons were unbalanced, with the fall season completing a full double round-robin while the shorter spring season only had single round-robin. The NASL cancelled its Spring 2018 season after it lost Division II sanctioning from the United States Soccer Federation and later ceased operations amid a legal challenge against the federation. The third-division National Independent Soccer Association debuted in 2019 with a split season format that was played from fall to spring. The fall and spring seasons both had their own playoffs to determine the league champions. The format was abandoned following the Fall 2021 season as the league moved to a spring-to-fall single-season schedule.

== Elsewhere ==
=== Soviet Union ===
The USSR Championship in football among "exhibition teams" (later "teams of masters") started in 1936. Its first season (1936) contained a split-season format for all four tiers of the championship including Groups (A, B, V, and Ghe). In 1976 a split-season format was once again revived for the Top League only and for a single season. On both occasions the seasons were conducted in a single round-robin tournament.

=== Belgium ===
In Belgium a large reform of the Belgian football league system was performed in 2016, which reduced the number of professional teams to 24, with only 8 teams remaining at the second level, called Belgian First Division B. From the 2016–17 season until the 2019–20 season, the 8 teams played two tournaments, with the winners of both tournaments playing a two-legged playoff to determine the overall champion. This format was abolished for the 2020–21 season, and the competition reverted to a traditional format played from August to April.

=== Japan ===
For most of its history (except in 1996) the J. League in Japan had a similar system for its first division, although it was called 1st Stage and 2nd Stage. The seasons became unified in 2005, partially to avoid conflicts with the Emperor's Cup. It briefly resumed the same format for 2015 and 2016 seasons. The Japan Football League, at the fourth tier, briefly introduced the format from 2014 to 2019.

=== Singapore ===
The first season of S.League in 1996 was played in split seasons and a playoff model, with the first series being named Tiger Beer Series, and the second series being named Pioneer Series. Winners of both series then played each other at the end of the season in a championship Playoff, with the winner of the Playoff being crowned the first champion of S.League. This split seasons format has not been used since the first season.

=== South Korea ===
The K-League of South Korea also had the same system in 1984, 1986, 1995, 2004, 2005, and 2006. In 2007, it again became unified because of confusion among fans.

== Apertura and Clausura by country ==
All the following leagues are their country's top national division (Div 1) unless otherwise indicated.

Country	League	Champions	Calendar	Seasons
CONMEBOL
Argentina	Liga Profesional	Both	European (August–June); American (January–December)	1990/91–2014; 2025–present
Bolivia	División Profesional	One	European (August–May); American (January–December)	1991–2017; 2018–2020, 2022, 2024
Chile	Liga de Primera	One	European (July–June); American (January–December)	2013/14–2017; 1997, 2002–2009, 2011–2012
Colombia	Categoría Primera A	Both	American (February–December)	2002–present
Ecuador	LigaPro Serie A	One (Both in 2005)	American (February–December)	2005–present
Paraguay	División de Honor	Both (Since 2007)	American (February–December)	1996–present
Peru	Liga 1	One	American (February–November)	1997–2008, 2014–present
Uruguay	Liga AUF Uruguaya	One	European (August–June); American (January–December)	1994–2016; 2017–present
Venezuela	Liga FUTVE	One	European (July–May); American (January–December)	1986/87–2015; 2016–2019, 2024–present
CONCACAF
Belize	Premier League	Both (Since 2012–13)	European (August–May)	2012/13–present
Canada	Canadian Premier League	One	American (April–October)	2019
Costa Rica	Liga FPD	Both	European (August–May)	2007/08–present
El Salvador	Primera División	Both	European (August–June)	1998/99–present
Guatemala	Liga Guate	Both	European (July–May)	1999/00–present
Guyana	GFF Elite League	One	European (September–June)	2015/16–present
Haiti	Ligue Haïtienne	Both (Since 2002, except in 2005–06)	American (April–November)	2002, 2003, 2004/05, 2007–present
Honduras	Liga Nacional de Fútbol	Both (Since 1997–98)	European (August–May)	1997/98–present
Mexico	Liga MX	Both	European (July–May)	1996/97–present
Nicaragua	Liga Primera	One	European	2004/05–present
Panama	Liga Panameña	Both (Since 2007)	European (July–May)	2001/02–present
Puerto Rico	Liga Puerto Rico Pro	Both	European (August–June)	2022/23–present
United States	NASL (defunct, Div 2)	One	American (April–November)	2013–2017
United States	NISA (Div 3)	One	European (August–June)	2019–2021
AFC
Japan	J1 League	One	American (March–November)	1993–1995, 1997–2005, 2015–2016
Japan	Japan Football League (Div 4)	One	American (March–November)	2014–2019
Singapore	S.League	One	American (April-November)	1996
South Korea	K League Classic	One	American (March–November)	1984, 1986, 1995, 2004, 2005, 2006
UEFA
Belgium	First Division B (Div 2)	One	European (August–May)	2016/17–2019/20
Malta	Maltese Premier League	One	European (August–May)	2024/25–present
Soviet Union	Top League (Group A)	Both	American (January–December)	1936, 1976

== Other sports ==
In baseball, the Double-A Southern and Texas Leagues in the United States both use a similar system, dividing the March–October regular season in half, with records being cleared mid-season, and the top teams mid-season and at the end of the season clinching spots in the playoff for the league pennant (the remainder of playoff slots being filled by wild cards). This system is used in some Single-A leagues, as well. The March–September Chinese Professional Baseball League and winter Mexican Pacific League also follow the same structure, using a team's win record in each stage to determine which advance to the playoffs. Japan's Pacific League had a split season format from 1973 to 1982, with a mini-playoff between the two winners to determine the league's champion. While Little League Baseball does not mandate any specific scheduling format to be used by local leagues, it recommends dividing the regular season in half and having the first-half winner play against the second-half winner at the end of the season for the championship.

The Philippine Basketball Association conducts a split season similar in many ways to the Apertura and Clausura. All League of Legends leagues operate on a split-season system, with one split in the spring and one in the summer. The summer is reserved for the spring split playoffs and the Mid-Season Invitational, while the fall is reserved for the summer split playoffs and the League of Legends World Championship. Qualification to the World Championship is decided in one of two ways: finishing within the top three within the second split playoffs (for the LCS) or, for the LCK and LPL, either winning the second split or through a system that awards points based on a team's performance in each of the splits, with the best non-qualified teams entering the regional finals for the last one or two spots. Unlike most other split-season formats, the summer split is more important than the spring split; coming second in the summer split is worth as many points as winning the spring split. The LEC has three splits, winter, spring and summer, as well as an end-of-season tournament called Season Finals which decides which teams qualify for the World Championship. The first four seasons of the National Hockey League used a half-season system, with the winners of the two half-seasons playing in the league final.
