= Tupãzinho (footballer, born 1939) =

Brazilian footballer

Personal information
- Full name: José Ernâni da Rosa
- Date of birth: 17 October 1939
- Place of birth: Bagé, Brazil
- Date of death: 28 February 1986 (aged 46)
- Place of death: São Paulo, Brazil
- Position: Forward

Senior career*
| Years | Team | Apps | (Gls) |
| 1957–1960 | Grêmio Bagé | | |
| 1961–1962 | Guarany de Bagé | | |
| 1963–1968 | Palmeiras | 232 | (122) |
| 1969 | Grêmio | 39 | (9) |
| 1970–1971 | Nacional | | |

International career
| 1965 | Brazil | 1 | (1) |
- * Club domestic league appearances and goals as of 13 December 2025

Tupãzinho, real name José Ernâni da Rosa (Bagé, October 17, 1939 – São Paulo, February 28, 1986), was a Brazilian football player at the position of forward.

== Honours ==
Palmeiras

- São Paulo State Championship: 1963, 1966
- Rio-São Paulo Tournament: 1965
- Campeonato Brasileiro Série A: 1967, 1967
- Copa Libertadores runner-up: 1968
