= Luis Hernán Carvallo =

Chilean footballer and manager (born 1949)

Personal information
- Full name: Luis Hernán Carvallo Muñoz
- Date of birth: 21 September 1949 (age 77)
- Place of birth: Santiago, Chile
- Height: 1.65 m (5 ft 5 in)
- Position: Midfielder

Team information
- Current team: Universidad Católica (youth manager)

Senior career*
Years	Team	Apps	(Gls)
1966–1976	Universidad Católica	198	(5)
1966	→ Deportes Concepción (loan)		
1970	→ Unión Española (loan)	38	(2)
Total		236	(7)

Managerial career
- 1991: Universidad Católica (youth)
- 2002: Palestino (assistant)
- 2003–2004: Unión Española (assistant)
- 2005: Palestino (assistant)
- 2006: Unión Española (assistant)
- 2007–2008: Unión Española (youth)
- 2008: Unión Española (caretaker)
- 2008–2009: Unión Española
- 2011–: Universidad Católica (youth)
- * Club domestic league appearances and goals

Luis Hernán Carvallo Muñoz (born 21 September 1949) is a Chilean former footballer and manager.

== Playing career ==
In 1966 he had a brief stint with Deportes Concepción, alongside teammates such as Hugo Cicamois, Adán Godoy and Esteban Varas.

== Managerial career ==
He worked alongside his brother, Fernando, the most part of his career. In 2007 and 2008 he worked in the Unión Española youth ranks, and next he assumed as the manager of the first team, reaching the 2009 Apertura final versus Universidad de Chile. In 2011, he returned to the Universidad Católica, where he had worked at the beginning of the 1990s, at under-17 level, working alongside Rodrigo Astudillo.

== Personal life ==
He is the son of 1950 FIFA World Cup player Hernán Carvallo and the younger brother of Fernando Carvallo.

He graduated as a Construction Engineer at the Universidad Técnica del Estado.

== Honours ==
=== Club ===
==== Player ====
Universidad Católica

- Primera División de Chile: 1966
- Segunda División de Chile: 1975

==== Manager ====
Unión Española

- Primera División de Chile: Runner-up 2009 Apertura
