= Hernán Carvallo =

Chilean footballer (1922-2011)

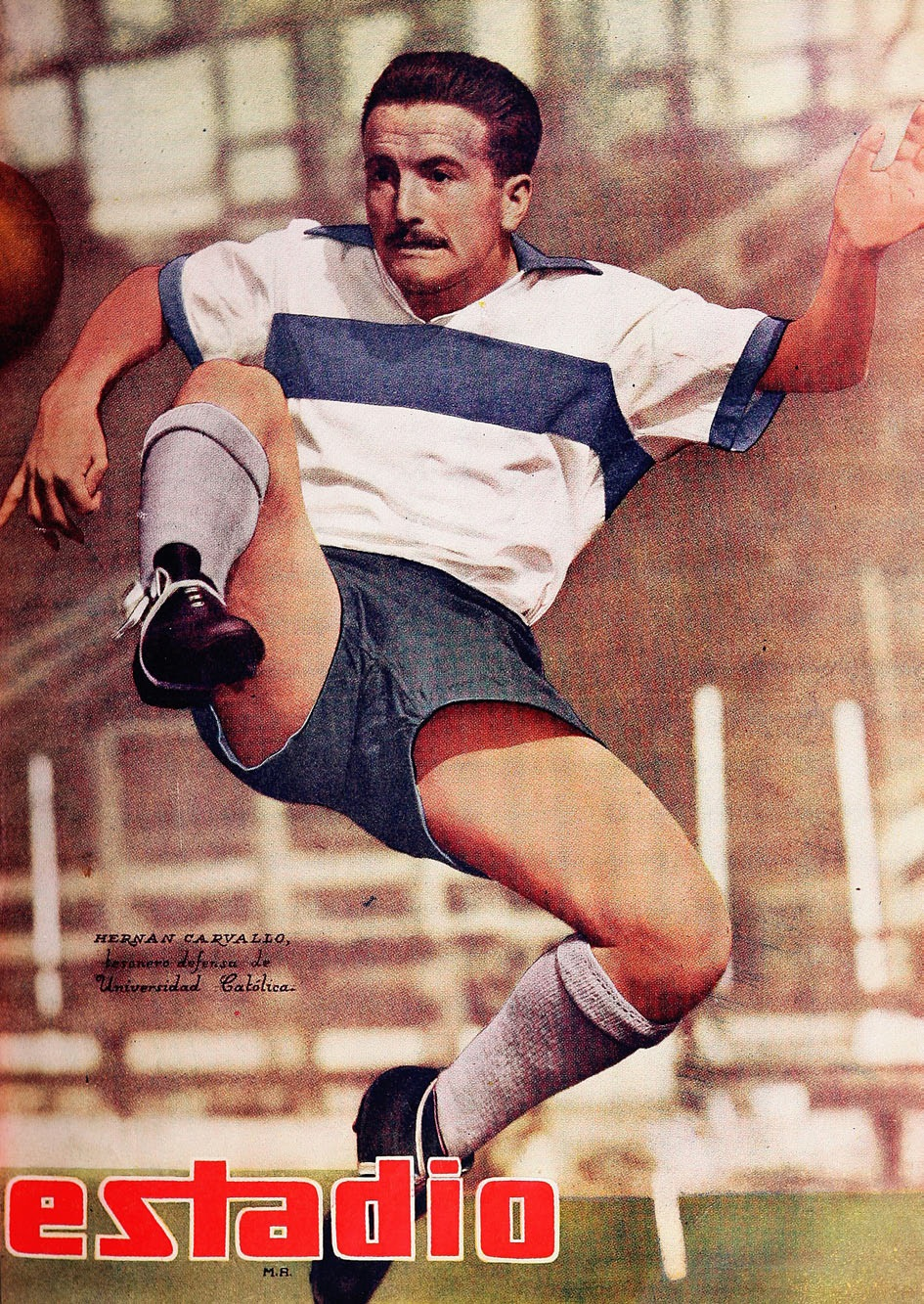

Personal information
- Full name: Luis Hernán Carvallo Castro
- Date of birth: 19 August 1922
- Date of death: 24 March 2011 (aged 88)
- Position: Midfielder

Senior career*
Years	Team	Apps	(Gls)
- Universidad Católica

International career
1946–1950	Chile	7	(0)
- * Club domestic league appearances and goals

Luis Hernán Carvallo Castro (19 August 1922 – 24 March 2011), known as Hernán Carvallo, was a Chilean football midfielder who played for Chile in the 1950 FIFA World Cup. He also played for Universidad Católica.

== International career ==
Carvallo made seven appearances for the Chile national team between 1946 and 1950, taking part in both the 1946 South American Championship and the 1950 FIFA World Cup.

== Personal life ==
Carvallo was the father of the also footballers Fernando, who was an international with Chile, and Luis Hernán. All three played for Universidad Católica.

Carvallo was nicknamed Chico (Short) due to his height.

== Record at FIFA tournaments ==
National team	Year	Apps	Goals
Chile	1950	2	0

== Honours ==
Universidad Católica

- Torneo de Consuelo del Campeonato de Apertura de Chile (1): 1949
- Chilean Primera División (2): 1949, 1954
- Chilean Segunda División (1): 1956
