= Humberto Cruz =

Chilean footballer (born 1939)

Humberto "Chita" Cruz
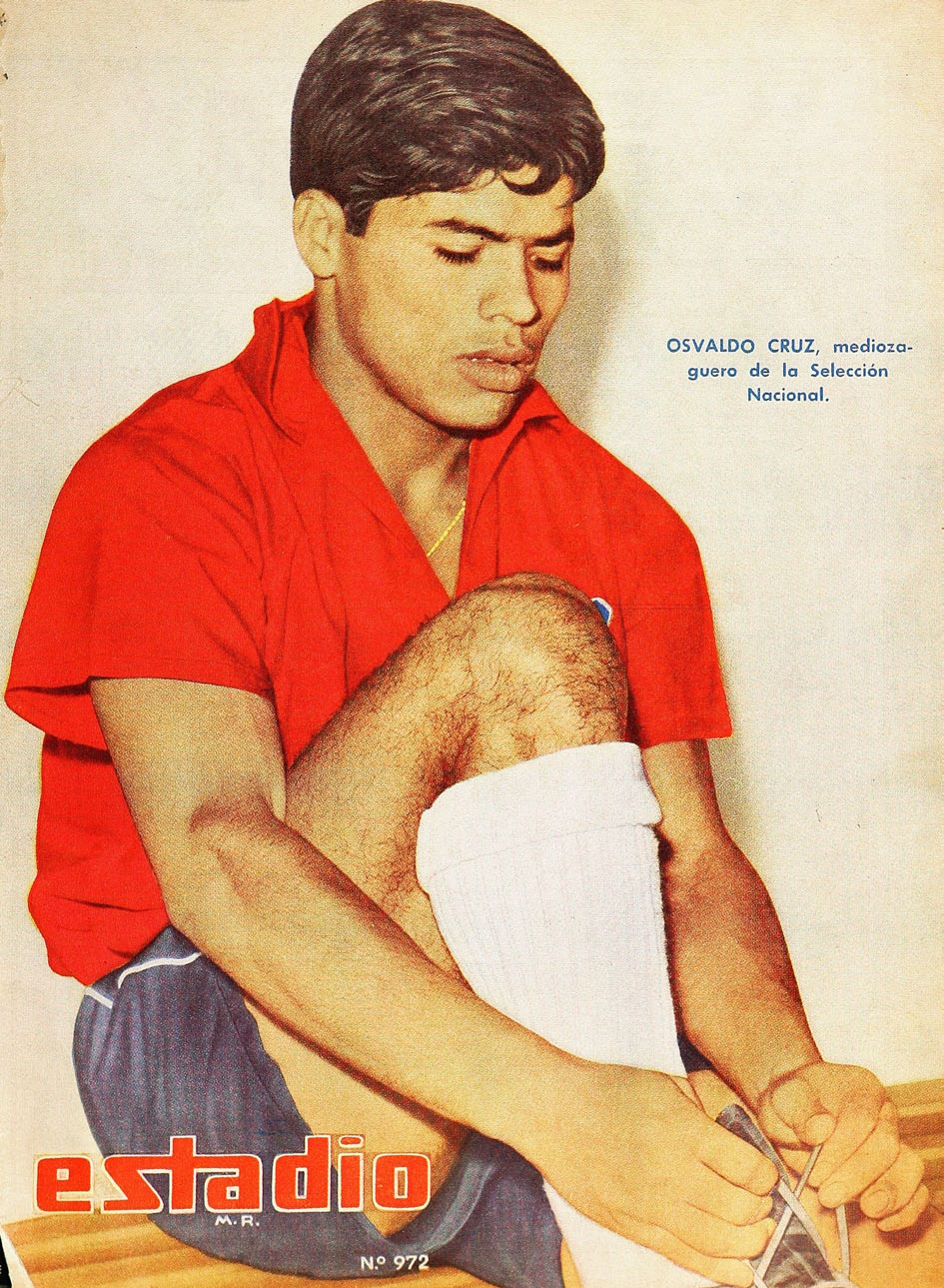
- Cruz in 1962

Personal information
- Full name: Humberto Carlos Nelson Cruz Silva
- Date of birth: 8 December 1939 (age 86)
- Place of birth: Santiago, Chile
- Height: 1.65 m (5 ft 5 in)
- Position: Centre-back

Youth career
- Máximo Garay
- 1956: Colo-Colo

Senior career*
Years	Team	Apps	(Gls)
1957–1962	Santiago Morning	120	(5)
1963–1971	Colo-Colo	259	(4)
1972	O'Higgins		
1973–1974	Ñublense	67	(2)
1976	Ferroviarios		
Total		446	(11)

International career
1961–1970	Chile	37	(0)

Managerial career
- 1978: Magallanes
- 1981–1982: Santiago Morning
- 1983: Deportes Laja
- 1984: Unión Española
- 1984: Fernández Vial
- 1985: Deportes Ovalle
- 1986: Ñublense
- 1986: Deportes Antofagasta
- 1988: Cobreandino
- 1990–1991: Deportes Ovalle
- 1996: Deportes Melipilla
Medal record
Men's football
Representing Chile
FIFA World Cup
Third place	1962 Chile
- * Club domestic league appearances and goals

Humberto Carlos Nelson Cruz Silva (Spanish pronunciation: [umˈbeɾto ˈkɾuθ], born 8 December 1939) is a Chilean retired footballer that played in two FIFA World Cups (1962, Chile third place, and 1966) as centre-back, despite his short height. He also has been a close friend of Pelé since they played against each other in the 1960s. According to Pelé, Cruz was one of his best markers and in several interviews he has mentioned the classic moment when Cruz pulled down his pants so he wouldn't elude him. His nickname is after Cheeta (pronounced Chita in Spanish), Tarzan's ape companion.

== Personal life ==
Cruz is well known by his nickname Chita (Cheetah) which it was given when he was a youth player of club Máximo Garay from Estación Central due to his speed to mark as a defender.

His son, Humberto Cruz Floh, was with the Universidad Católica youth ranks and represented Chile at under-20 level in the 1985 South American Championship. Another son, Claudio Cruz, played for Deportes Antofagasta and Audax Italiano.

== Honours ==
Santiago Morning

- Segunda División: 1959

Colo-Colo

- Primera División: 1963, 1970

Chile

- FIFA World Cup: Third place 1962
- Copa América: Third place 1967
- Copa O'Higgins: 1966
- Copa del Pacífico: 1968
