= Fernando Carvallo =

Chilean footballer and manager (born 1948)

Personal information
- Full name: Rubén Fernando Carvallo Muñoz
- Date of birth: September 24, 1948 (age 78)
- Place of birth: Santiago, Chile
- Position: Midfielder

Youth career
- Universidad Católica

Senior career*
| Years | Team | Apps | (Gls) |
| 1966–1972 | Universidad Católica | | |
| 1972 | → Unión San Felipe (loan) | | |
| 1973 | Unión Española | | |
| 1973–1978 | Cádiz CF | | |
| 1978–1983 | Unión Española | | |

International career
| 1972 | Chile | 3 | (0) |

Managerial career
- 1990–1991: Universidad Católica
- 1995–1996: Chile U23
- 1996–1999: Universidad Católica
- 2002: Palestino
- 2003–2004: Unión Española
- 2005: Palestino
- 2006: Unión Española
- 2007–2008: Universidad Católica
- 2011–2012: Chile U20
- * Club domestic league appearances and goals

Rubén Fernando Carvallo Muñoz (born September 24, 1948), known as Fernando Carvallo, is a Chilean former football player and manager.

== International career ==
Carvallo made three appearances for the Chile national team in 1972.

== Managerial career ==
Carvallo's first coaching experience was in 1990 when he coached the first team of Universidad Católica for a short time. In 1996, he signed again as the coach of the team and won the 1997 Apertura. He left the club in 1999 and retired from coaching, but in 2002 was signed as coach of Palestino. Later, he coached Unión Española and lost the final of 2004 Clausura with Cobreloa. He returned to Palestino in 2005 and again to Unión Española in 2006. In 2007, he replaced José del Solar in the UC, but after an irregular campaign with the team, he quit and was replaced by Mario Lepe. From 2011 to 2012, he was the manager of Chile at under-20 level.

After two experiences as Sports Director for both Colo-Colo (2015–16) and Magallanes (2019), he retired from football and spends time playing paddle tennis.

In December 2022, Carvallo returned to the football activity by joining Deportes Iquique as head of the youth system.

== Personal life ==
His father was the Chile international footballer Hernán Carvallo, and his younger brother is the also former footballer Luis Hernán Carvallo. All three played for Universidad Católica.

== Honours ==
=== Player ===
Universidad Católica

- Chilean Primera División: 1966

Unión Española

- Chilean Primera División: 1973

=== Manager ===
Universidad Católica

- Chilean Primera División: 1997 Apertura
