= Hugo Cicamois =

Chilean footballer

Personal information
- Full name: Pedro Hugo Cicamois Díaz
- Place of birth: Santiago, Chile
- Position: Defender

Youth career
- Universidad Católica

Senior career*
| Years | Team | Apps | (Gls) |
| 1966–1967 | Universidad Católica | 8 | (0) |
| 1966 | → Deportes Concepción (loan) | | |
- Lota Schwager
| 1971 | San Antonio Unido | | |
| 1973 | Unión San Felipe | 10 | (0) |
| 1975 | Luq San Guayaquil | | |

Managerial career
- 1995–1996: Curicó Unido
- 2001: Curicó Unido
- * Club domestic league appearances and goals

Pedro Hugo Cicamois Díaz, known as Hugo Cicamois, is a Chilean former professional footballer who played as a defender. Besides Chile, he played in Ecuador.

== Career ==
A defender from the Universidad Católica youth system, where he coincided with players such as Miguel Hermosilla, Luis Hernán Carvallo, among others, Cicamois played for the first team in 1966–67 winning the league title of the Chilean Primera División in 1966. Previously, he had a brief stint with Deportes Concepción in 1966, alongside teammates such as Adán Godoy, Luis Hernán Carvallo and Esteban Varas.

He also played for Unión San Felipe in the top division.

In the Chilean second level, he played for Lota Schwager and San Antonio Unido.

Abroad, he played in Ecuador for club Luq San from Guayaquil in the 1975 season, alongside his compatriots Jorge Guzmán and Alejandro Arancibia.

As a football manager, he has coached Curicó Unido.

== Personal life ==
His son of the same name, Hugo Cicamois Bedon, is a former footballer who played for Puerto Rico Islanders in 2006 and soccer manager who has worked for Atlanta Fire United.
