= 1967 Campeonato Nacional Primera División =

Campeonato Nacional de Fútbol Profesional
- Dates: 9 April 1967 – 23 December 1967
- Champions: Universidad de Chile (6th title)
- Relegated: San Luis
- 1968 Copa Libertadores: Universidad de Chile; Universidad Católica
- Matches: 306
- Goals: 943 (3.08 per match)
- Top goalscorer: Eladio Zárate (28)
- Biggest home win: Universidad de Chile 6–0 Huachipato (1 October)
- Highest attendance: 76,823 Universidad Católica 2–3 Universidad de Chile (29 November)
- Total attendance: 3,079,864
- Average attendance: 10,065

The 1967 Campeonato Nacional de Fútbol Profesional, was the 35th season of top-flight football in Chile. Universidad de Chile won their sixth title, also qualifying for the 1968 Copa Libertadores.

== League table ==
Pos	Team	Pld	W	D	L	GF	GA	GD	Pts	Qualification or relegation
1	Universidad de Chile	34	25	6	3	81	33	+48	56	Champions, qualified to 1968 Copa Libertadores
2	Universidad Católica	34	17	10	7	68	48	+20	44	Qualified to 1968 Copa Libertadores
3	Colo-Colo	34	16	9	9	74	51	+23	41	
4	Unión Española	34	16	6	12	74	56	+18	38	
5	Magallanes	34	12	14	8	55	45	+10	38	
6	Huachipato	34	11	13	10	56	50	+6	35	
7	Deportes La Serena	34	9	16	9	45	44	+1	34	
8	Unión San Felipe	34	11	12	11	41	55	−14	34	
9	Santiago Morning	34	12	9	13	55	58	−3	33	
10	Audax Italiano	34	9	15	10	50	54	−4	33	
11	O'Higgins	34	9	13	12	53	53	0	31	
12	Palestino	34	8	13	13	47	49	−2	29	
13	Santiago Wanderers	34	7	15	12	37	45	−8	29	
14	Everton	34	8	13	13	47	63	−16	29	
15	Green Cross Temuco	34	10	8	16	47	63	−16	28	
16	Rangers	34	7	13	14	40	54	−14	27	
17	Unión La Calera	34	9	9	16	44	72	−28	27	
18	San Luis	34	7	12	15	29	50	−21	26	Relegated to Segunda División

Primera División de Chile
1967 champion
Universidad de Chile
6th title

== Results ==
Home \ Away	AUD	COL	EVE	GCT	HUA	DLS	MAG	OHI	PAL	RAN	USF	SLU	SMO	ULC	UES	UCA	UCH	SWA
Audax		1–1	1–1	2–0	2–2	0–0	1–0	2–2	3–2	1–0	3–0	2–1	4–3	1–1	0–0	3–5	3–3	1–1
Colo-Colo	3–1		1–0	3–1	1–1	2–2	2–1	1–1	2–1	4–0	5–3	1–0	0–0	3–4	2–3	5–2	2–0	1–0
Everton	2–2	1–4		4–3	2–2	0–0	0–1	2–1	1–4	1–3	1–1	3–0	3–1	0–1	1–0	0–0	0–3	1–1
Green Cross T.	1–0	3–1	3–5		1–1	3–1	1–5	1–1	1–0	2–1	2–2	1–1	3–2	4–0	2–1	2–3	1–4	0–0
Huachipato	1–1	1–1	1–1	2–1		1–0	2–0	3–4	2–0	0–1	5–0	3–3	2–0	4–0	1–2	3–1	0–2	1–1
La Serena	4–3	2–2	4–1	2–0	0–0		1–1	2–2	0–0	3–0	1–0	0–0	0–2	2–0	1–4	2–2	0–1	1–0
Magallanes	1–0	3–2	1–2	2–1	2–0	1–1		4–2	2–2	2–1	4–1	3–1	1–1	1–1	1–1	3–4	3–3	0–2
O'Higgins	0–2	1–1	1–0	5–1	3–3	1–0	0–1		5–2	0–0	1–1	2–0	1–2	1–2	1–0	1–1	0–0	1–2
Palestino	2–0	3–2	2–2	3–0	1–0	1–1	2–2	3–2		3–4	2–3	0–0	2–2	2–2	2–0	0–1	1–2	2–1
Rangers	2–2	2–2	2–3	0–0	1–3	2–3	0–0	3–3	0–0		1–1	2–0	1–3	2–0	0–1	0–0	1–3	1–1
San Felipe	3–0	0–2	2–2	1–0	3–1	0–0	0–0	3–1	0–0	1–1		0–0	2–1	1–0	2–1	2–1	0–3	2–2
San Luis	0–2	0–3	2–2	1–0	0–3	3–3	1–2	0–0	2–1	0–0	4–1		1–0	2–0	1–5	0–1	2–0	2–0
S. Morning	1–1	4–3	4–3	0–2	3–2	1–4	0–0	1–0	1–1	1–3	1–3	1–0		5–1	2–1	2–2	1–2	2–2
La Calera	1–1	0–5	5–0	1–1	3–1	4–2	2–2	2–5	1–1	1–1	1–0	0–0	1–2		0–4	1–3	0–2	3–2
U. Española	5–2	4–2	2–2	4–2	3–4	1–1	2–1	3–3	1–0	2–1	3–0	5–1	1–3	4–1		2–4	2–2	4–0
U. Católica	3–1	2–3	2–0	1–2	0–0	1–0	2–2	3–1	2–2	5–1	0–1	0–0	1–1	2–1	6–2		3–2	2–0
U. de Chile	1–0	2–1	3–1	3–1	6–0	3–0	3–2	2–0	1–0	2–1	4–0	1–1	2–1	5–2	4–1	3–2		1–1
S. Wanderers	2–2	2–1	0–0	1–1	1–1	2–2	1–1	0–1	1–0	1–2	2–2	3–0	3–1	1–2	1–0	0–1	0–3	

Legend: Blue = home team win; Yellow = draw; Red = away team win.

== Topscorer ==
Name	Team	Goals
(Paraguay) Eladio Zárate	Unión Española	28
