= Adán Godoy =

Chilean footballer (1936–2026)

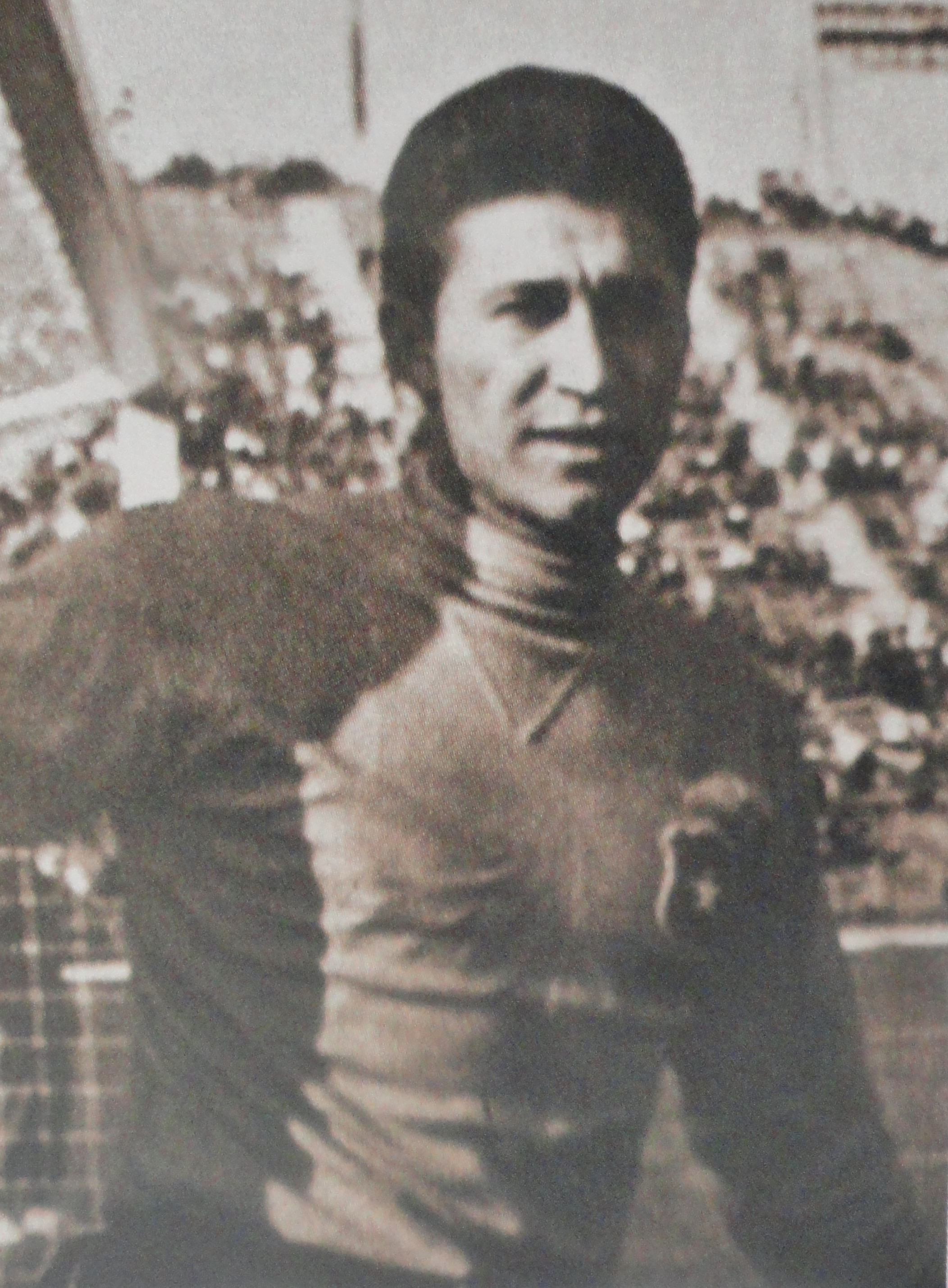
- Godoy with Chile at the 1962 FIFA World Cup

Personal information
- Full name: Adán Aquilino Godoy Rubina
- Date of birth: 26 November 1936
- Place of birth: Copiapó, Chile
- Date of death: 5 April 2026 (aged 89)
- Place of death: La Serena, Chile
- Height: 1.74 m (5 ft 9 in)
- Position: Goalkeeper

Senior career*
Years	Team	Apps	(Gls)
1956–1957	Colo-Colo		
1958–1964	Santiago Morning		
1965–1968	Universidad Católica		
1966	→ Deportes Concepción (loan)		
1969–1972	Audax Italiano		
1973–1979	Santiago Morning		

International career
1962–1966	Chile	14	(0)
Medal record
Men's football
Representing Chile
FIFA World Cup
Third place	1962 Chile
- * Club domestic league appearances and goals

Adán Aquilino Godoy Rubina (26 November 1936 – 5 April 2026) was a Chilean footballer who played as a goalkeeper for Chile in the 1962 and 1966 FIFA World Cups. He also played for Santiago Morning and Club Deportivo Universidad Católica.

== Club career ==
In 1966, he had a brief stint with Deportes Concepción, alongside teammates such as Hugo Cicamois, Luis Hernán Carvallo and Esteban Varas.

== International career ==
Godoy made his debut with Chile in the 1–0 win against Yugoslavia for the 1962 FIFA World Cup's third place.

== Personal life and death ==
Godoy was the father-in-law of the former Chile international footballer Carlos Rivas, with whom he coincided in Santiago Morning in 1977, at the same time he was the grandfather of the Canadian former player Carlos Rivas Jr., son of Carlos Sr.

Godoy died in La Serena on 5 April 2026, at the age of 89.

== Honours ==
Universidad Católica

- Torneo de Reservas: 1965, 1966, 1967

Santiago Morning

- Chilean Segunda División: 1959, 1974

Chile

- FIFA World Cup third place: 1962

Individual

- Mutual of Professional Referees - Best Sport Conduct: 1973
- Chilean Best Sportperson in Professional Football: 1974
