= Zequinha =

Brazilian footballer (1934-2009)

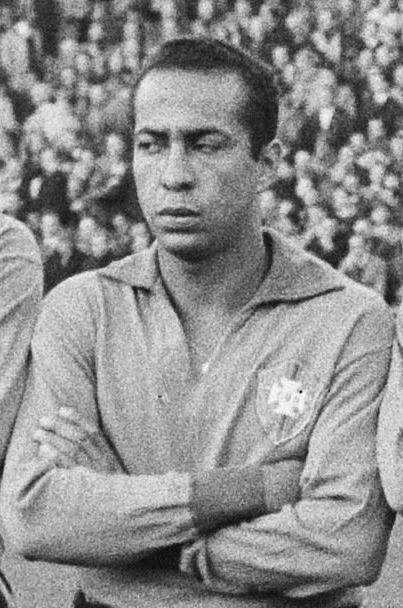
- Zequinha, May 1963

Personal information
- Full name: Jose Ferreira Franco
- Date of birth: 18 November 1934
- Place of birth: Recife, Pernambuco, Brazil
- Date of death: 25 July 2009 (aged 74)
- Height: 5 ft 11 in (1.80 m)
- Position: Midfielder

Senior career*
Years	Team	Apps	(Gls)
1954	Auto Esporte-PB	?	(?)
1954–1958	Santa Cruz-PE		
1958–1965	Palmeiras		
1965	Fluminense		
1965–1968	Palmeiras		
1968–1970	Atlético Paranaense		
1970	Náutico		

International career
1960–1965	Brazil	16	(2)
Medal record
Men's Football
Representing Brazil
FIFA World Cup
Winner	1962 Chile
- * Club domestic league appearances and goals

José Ferreira Franco (18 November 1934 in Recife – 25 July 2009), nicknamed Zequinha, was a Brazilian association footballer who played as a midfielder.

== Playing career ==
=== Club ===
During his club career he played for Auto Esporte-PB in 1954, Santa Cruz-PE from 1954 to 1958. He then went to São Paulo club Palmeiras from 1958 to 1968. After this he went to rivals Fluminense for the 1965 season before returning to Palmeiras playing there until 1968.

After leaving Palmeiras, Zequinha went to Curitiba side Atlético-PR for whom he played for from 1968 until 1970. His last season in Brazil came with Náutico in 1970.

=== International ===
He earned 16 caps and scored 2 goals for the Brazil national football team between 1960 and 1965. And he was also a part of the 1962 FIFA World Cup winning squad, although he did not play any matches during the tournament. He did though pick up a winners' medal at the tournament, being an unused substitute.

On 25 July 2009, Zequinha died of a heart attack at the age of 74.

== Honours ==
=== Santa Cruz ===
- Campeonato Pernambucano: 1957

=== Palmeiras ===
- Campeonato Paulista: 1959, 1963, 1966
- Rio-São Paulo Tournament: 1965
- Campeonato Brasileiro Série A: 1960, 1967, 1967
- Copa Libertadores runner-up: 1961, 1968

=== International ===
- FIFA World Cup: 1962
- Copa Roca: 1960, 1963
- Pan American Games: 1963
