= 1959 Campeonato Nacional Segunda División =

Segunda División
- Season: 1959
- Champions: Santiago Morning
- Promoted: Santiago Morning
- Relegated: None

The 1959 Segunda División de Chile was the 8th season of the Segunda División de Chile.

Santiago Morning was the tournament's winner.

== Table ==
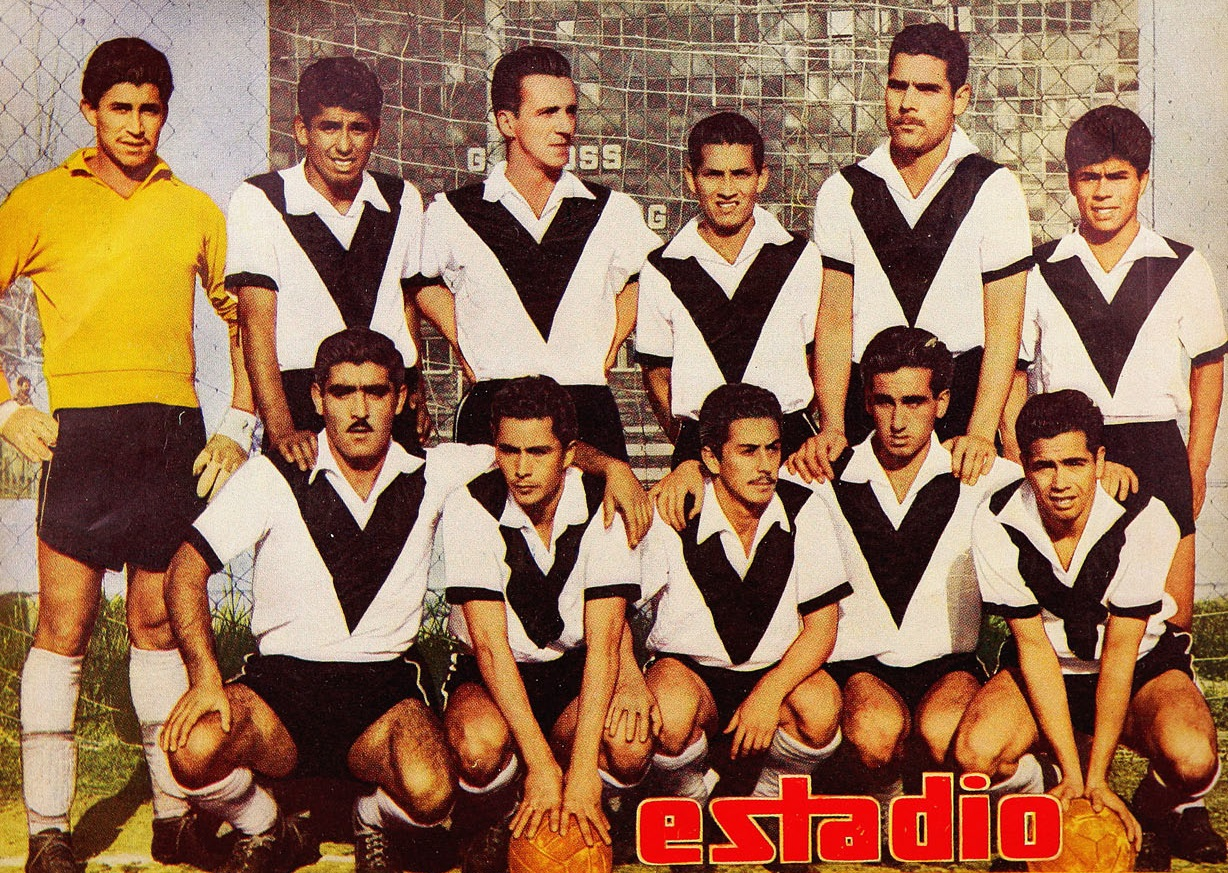
Santiago Morning 1959 B: Adán Godoy, Rolando Armijo, Sergio Goity, Carlos Arce, Fernando Wurth, Humberto Cruz. F: José Torres, Santiago Leiva, Fernando Rodriguez, Jorge Fuenzalida, Roberto Suazo

Pos	Team	Pld	W	D	L	GF	GA	GD	Pts
1	Santiago Morning (C, P)	22	16	4	2	49	19	+30	36
2	Green Cross	22	14	5	3	53	27	+26	33
3	Unión La Calera	22	12	7	3	41	21	+20	31
4	San Fernando	22	6	10	6	32	27	+5	22
5	Coquimbo Unido	22	9	4	9	42	40	+2	22
6	Trasandino	22	8	6	8	30	31	−1	22
7	San Bernardo Central	22	8	6	8	28	34	−6	22
8	Unión San Felipe	22	6	7	9	34	37	−3	19
9	Ñublense	22	8	3	11	30	38	−8	19
10	Universidad Técnica del Estado	22	4	7	11	26	43	−17	15
11	Alianza de Curicó	22	4	6	12	34	48	−14	14
12	Iberia	22	1	7	14	17	51	−34	9

Source: rsssf.com
(C) Champions; (P) Promoted

== See also ==
- Chilean football league system
