= Célio Taveira =

Brazilian footballer (1940–2020)

Personal information
- Full name: Célio Taveira Filho
- Date of birth: 16 October 1940
- Place of birth: Santos, Brazil
- Date of death: 29 May 2020 (aged 79)
- Place of death: João Pessoa, Brazil
- Position: Striker

Senior career*
Years	Team	Apps	(Gls)
1958	Portuguesa Santista		
1959	Ponte Preta		
1960–1962	Jabaquara		
1963–1966	Vasco da Gama		
1967–1970	Nacional		
1970–1971	Corinthians		
1972	Operário		

International career
1965–1966	Brazil	3	(0)
- * Club domestic league appearances and goals

Célio Taveira Filho (16 October 1940 – 29 May 2020) was a Brazilian footballer who played as a striker.

== Club career ==
Born in Santos, Taveira played for Portuguesa Santista, Ponte Preta, Jabaquara, Vasco da Gama, Nacional, Corinthians and Operário. He scored 100 goals for Vasco, being the club's 16th top goalscorer. For Nacional he scored 22 goals in the Copa Libertadores, being the 3rd highest Brazilian goalscorer in the competition. He retired at the age of 32 after injuring his collarbone in a collision with Rivellino in training.

== International career ==
He earned 3 caps for the Brazil national team. He was the last player to be cut from the Brazil squad for the 1966 FIFA World Cup.

== Later life and death ==
From the late 1970s he lived in João Pessoa, Paraíba, where he worked as a businessman (running a fruit export business) and radio sports commentator.

He died in hospital in João Pessoa on 29 May 2020, aged 79, from COVID-19, during the COVID-19 pandemic in Brazil. At the time of his death Taveira had four children, eight grandchildren and two great-grandchildren.
