= Néstor Isella =

Argentine-Chilean footballer and coach

Personal information
- Full name: Néstor Ítalo Julio Isella Ferlini
- Date of birth: 6 May 1937
- Place of birth: Rafaela, Argentina
- Date of death: 20 November 2015 (aged 78)
- Place of death: Ñuñoa, Santiago, Chile
- Position: Midfielder

Senior career*
Years	Team	Apps	(Gls)
1956–1959	Unión Santa Fe		
1960	Boca Juniors		
1961	Gimnasia LP		
1962	River Plate		
1963–1970	Universidad Católica		

Managerial career
- 1971–1972: Unión Española
- 1973: Palestino
- 1973: Universidad Católica
- 1974: Deportes Concepción
- 1978: Universidad Católica
- 1978–1979: Audax Italiano
- 1979: Coquimbo Unido
- 1979–1980: Audax Italiano
- * Club domestic league appearances and goals

Néstor Ítalo Julio Isella Ferlini (May 6, 1937 – November 20, 2015) was an Argentine-Chilean professional footballer and head coach who played as a midfielder for clubs of Argentina and Chile. He was born in Rafaela, Argentina.

== Clubs (Player) ==
- Unión de Santa Fe 1956–1959
- Boca Juniors 1960
- Gimnasia y Esgrima de La Plata 1961
- River Plate 1962
- Universidad Católica 1963–1970

== Clubs (Head coach) ==
- Unión Española 1971–1972
- Palestino 1973
- Universidad Católica 1973
- Deportes Concepción 1974
- Universidad Católica 1978
- Audax Italiano 1978–1979
- Coquimbo Unido 1979
- Audax Italiano 1979–1980

== Personal life ==
From 1990 to 2001, Isella worked as a football commentator and analyst for the Chilean TV channel Canal 13, making a renowned pair alongside Alberto Fouillioux in the TV program Futgol.

== Honours ==
- Universidad Católica 1966 Chilean Primera División
