= Lala (footballer) =

Brazilian footballer

Personal information
- Full name: Geraldo José dos Santos
- Date of birth: 12 April 1946
- Place of birth: Recife, Brazil
- Date of death: 28 July 2015 (aged 69)
- Place of death: Recife, Brazil
- Position: Left winger

Youth career
- –1963: Náutico

Senior career*
Years	Team	Apps	(Gls)
1963–1971	Náutico	358	(50)
1971–1972	Maguary-CE		
1972–1973	América-PE		
- * Club domestic league appearances and goals as of 23 October 2024

Geraldo José dos Santos (12 April 1946 – 28 July 2015), better known as Lala, was a Brazilian professional footballer who played as a left winger.

== Career ==
Revealed by Náutico's youth sectors in 1963, Lala was part of the historic six-time state champion squad, as well as champion of the Northern Champions Cup. He made 358 appearances for the club, scoring 50 goals in total. He also played for SC Maguary and América-PE.

== Death ==
Lalá, who worked at Náutico, fell ill on 24 July 2015. He was hospitalized until 28 July at the Hospital Português in Recife, when he died due to kidney failure.

== Honours ==
Náutico

- Campeonato Pernambucano: 1963, 1964, 1965, 1966, 1967, 1968
- Copa dos Campeões do Norte: 1966
