= Esteban Varas =

Chilean footballer

Personal information
- Full name: Esteban Lorenzo Varas Rocco
- Place of birth: Chile
- Position: Forward

Youth career
- Universidad Católica

Senior career*
Years	Team	Apps	(Gls)
1964–1969	Universidad Católica	89	(14)
1966	→ Deportes Concepción (loan)		
1970	Deportes Concepción	31	(2)
1971	Ñublense		
1972	Antofagasta Portuario	25	(7)
1973	Bolívar		
1975–1977	Regional Antofagasta	24	(0)
- * Club domestic league appearances and goals

Esteban Lorenzo Varas Rocco is a Chilean former footballer who played as a forward.

== Career ==
Varas spent six seasons with Universidad Católica at the top division from 1964 to 1969, winning the league title in 1966. In 1966, he had a brief stint with Deportes Concepción, alongside teammates such as Hugo Cicamois, Adán Godoy and Luis Hernán Carvallo.

The next three seasons, he played for Deportes Concepción (1970), Ñublense (1971) and Antofagasta Portuario (1972).

In 1973, he moved abroad and played for Bolívar alongside his compatriot Carlos Pacheco, becoming the first Chilean in the club history and one of the first Chileans in the Bolivian football before players such as Hugo Bravo, Juan Abel Ganga, Carlos Cordero, among others.

Back in Chile, he played for Regional Antofagasta until 1977.

== Personal life ==
Varas made his home in Miami, Florida.
