= Nino (footballer, born 1943) =

Brazilian footballer

Personal information
- Full name: Eidnilson José Torres Alves
- Date of birth: 4 September 1943
- Place of birth: Recife, Brazil
- Date of death: 4 May 2010 (aged 66)
- Place of death: Recife, Brazil
- Position: Forward

Senior career*
Years	Team	Apps	(Gls)
1964–1971	Náutico		(108)
1967	→ Deportivo Italia (loan)		
1971	Santa Cruz		
1972–1973	Vitória de Setúbal		
1973–1974	Fafe		
1975–1977	Ceará		
- * Club domestic league appearances and goals as of 8 October 2024

Eidnilson José Torres Alves (4 September 1943 – 4 May 2010), simply known as Nino, was a Brazilian professional footballer who played as a forward.

== Career ==
A center forward, Nino became famous during the 1960s when he was part of the Náutico squad and won six consecutive titles in the Campeonato Pernambucano. In total, Nino scored 108 goals for the club.

== Honours ==
Náutico

- Campeonato Pernambucano: 1963, 1964, 1965, 1966, 1967, 1968
- Copa dos Campeões do Norte: 1966

Ceará

- Campeonato Cearense: 1976, 1977

== Death ==
Nino died of respiratory failure, at Oswaldo Cruz Hospital in Recife, Pernambuco.
