= 1967 in Brazilian football =

Football in Brazil
- Season: 1967

The following article presents a summary of the 1967 football (soccer) season in Brazil, which was the 66th season of competitive football in the country.

== Taça Brasil ==
Semifinals

Team #1	Agg	Team #2	1st leg	2nd leg	3rd leg
Cruzeiro	2–4	Náutico	2–1	0–3	0–0
Grêmio	4–6	Palmeiras	2–1	1–3	1–2

Final

December 20, 1967

Náutico	1–3	Palmeiras

December 27, 1967

Palmeiras	1–2	Náutico

December 29, 1967

Palmeiras	2–0	Náutico

Palmeiras declared as the Taça Brasil champions by aggregate score of 6–3.

== Torneio Roberto Gomes Pedrosa ==
Final Stage

Position	Team	Points	Played
1	Palmeiras	9	6
2	Internacional	7	6
3	Corinthians	5	6
4	Grêmio	3	6

Palmeiras declared as the Torneio Roberto Gomes Pedrosa champions.

== State championship champions ==
State	Champion	State	Champion
Acre	GAS	Pará	Paysandu
Alagoas	CSA	Paraíba	Campinense
Amapá	Juventus-AP	Paraná	Água Verde
Amazonas	Olímpico	Pernambuco	Náutico
Bahia	Bahia	Piauí	Piauí
Ceará	Fortaleza	Rio de Janeiro	Goytacaz
Distrito Federal	Rabello	Rio Grande do Norte	América-RN
Espírito Santo	Desportiva	Rio Grande do Sul	Grêmio
Goiás	CRAC	Rondônia	Flamengo-RO
Guanabara	Botafogo	Roraima	-
Maranhão	Moto Club	Santa Catarina	Metropol
Mato Grosso	Operário (VG)	São Paulo	Santos
Mato Grosso do Sul	-	Sergipe	Sergipe
Minas Gerais	Cruzeiro	Tocantins	-

== Other competition champions ==
Competition	Champion
Copa Brasil Central	Goiânia

== Brazilian clubs in international competitions ==
Team	Copa Libertadores 1967
Cruzeiro	Semifinals
Santos	Withdrew

== Brazil national team ==
The following table lists all the games played by the Brazil national football team in official competitions and friendly matches during 1967.

Date	Opposition	Result	Score	Brazil scorers	Competition
June 25, 1967	Uruguay	D	0-0	-	Taça Rio Branco
June 28, 1967	Uruguay	D	2-2	Paulo Borges (2)	Taça Rio Branco
July 1, 1967	Uruguay	D	1-1	Dirceu Lopes	Taça Rio Branco
September 19, 1967	Chile	W	1-0	Roberto Miranda	International Friendly
